= Statute Law (Repeals) Act 1993 =

Act of the Parliament of the United Kingdom

Statute Law (Repeals) Act 1993 (Note: Section 4(1).)
- Act of Parliament
- Parliament of the United Kingdom
- Long title: An Act to promote the reform of the statute law by the repeal, in accordance with recommendations of the Law Commission and the Scottish Law Commission, of certain enactments which (except in so far as their effect is preserved) are no longer of practical utility, and to make other provision in connection with the repeal of those enactments; and to correct a mistake in the Statute Law (Repeals) Act 1978.
- Citation: 1993 c. 50
- Territorial extent: England and Wales; Scotland; Northern Ireland; Channel Islands; Isle of Man; (Note: Section 3.)

Dates
- Royal assent: 5 November 1993
- Commencement: 5 November 1993 (Note: Section 4(b) of the Interpretation Act 1978.)
Other legislation
Amends	Servants' Characters Act 1792; Cinque Ports Act 1821; Ordnance Survey Act 1841; Public Notaries Act 1843; Trafalgar Square Act 1844; House of Commons Costs Taxation Act 1847; House of Lords Costs Taxation Act 1849; Inclosure Act 1849; Ecclesiastical Commissioners Act 1850; Inclosure Act 1852; Lands Improvement Company’s Act 1853; Town Gardens Protection Act 1863; Improvement of Land Act 1864; Metropolitan Streets Act 1867; Wimbledon and Putney Commons Act 1871; Births and Deaths Registration Act 1874; Seal Fishery Act 1875; Disused Burial Grounds Act 1884; Notification of Births Act 1907; Small Holdings and Allotments Act 1908; Ferries (Acquisition by Local Authorities) Act 1919; Official Secrets Act 1920; Road Traffic Act 1930; Children and Young Persons Act 1933; Public Health Act 1936; Statutory Orders (Special Procedure) Act 1945; Crown Proceedings Act 1947; Post Office Act 1953; Companies Act 1967; Policyholders Protection Act 1975; Supreme Court Act 1981; See § Repealed enactments
Repeals/revokes	See § Repealed enactments
Amended by	Statute Law (Repeals) Act 1998; Parliamentary Costs Act 2006; Statute Law (Repeals) Act 2008
Relates to	See Statute Law (Repeals) Act

Status: Amended

Text of statute as originally enacted

Revised text of statute as amended

Text of the Statute Law (Repeals) Act 1993 as in force today (including any amendments) within the United Kingdom, from legislation.gov.uk.

The Statute Law (Repeals) Act 1993 (c. 50) is an act of the Parliament of the United Kingdom.

The act repealed the whole of 159 acts or orders and portions of 462 others, passed from and after the year 1503.

== Background ==
The act implemented recommendations contained in the fourteenth report on statute law revision, by the Law Commission and the Scottish Law Commission.

== Provisions ==
See section 6(1) of the Flood Prevention and Land Drainage (Scotland) Act 1997.

The Enfield Chase Act 1777 (17 Geo. 3. c. 17) had been repealed by the Statute Law (Repeals) Act 1978. Section 2 reversed this, stating the act was "deemed not to have been repealed".

2 17 Geo.3 c.17 deemed not to have been repealed by 1978 c. 45

(1) The Act of the 17th year of King George the third entitled “An Act for dividing the Chase of Enfield in the County of Middlesex; and for other Purposes therein mentioned” shall be deemed not to have been repealed by Part XIV of Schedule 1 to the Statute Law (Repeals) Act 1978.

(2) Nothing in subsection (1) shall be construed—

(a) as affirming the legal effect of any provision of the Act which was not of legal effect immediately before the repeal, or of anything done or purportedly done under the Act, or

(b) as imposing any liability in respect of anything done between the date of the repeal and the commencement of this section.

The majority of the act commenced upon royal assent.

The power conferred by section 4(3) (in relation to the Shipbuilding (Redundancy Payments) Act 1978 and the Shipbuilding Act 1985) was fully exercised by article 2 of the Statute Law (Repeals) Act 1993 (Commencement) Order 1996 (SI 1996/509).

4 Short title and commencement

(1) This Act may be cited as the Statute Law (Repeals) Act 1993.

(2) The repeal by this Act of—

(a) paragraph 5 of Schedule 2 to the [1939 c. 117] National Loans Act 1939,

(b) paragraph 10 of Schedule 1 to the [1946 c. 27] Bank of England Act 1946, and

(c) section 33(8) of the [1946 c. 59] Coal Industry Nationalisation Act 1946,

shall have effect, so far as relating to stock registered in the National Savings Stock Register, on the coming into force of the first regulations made by virtue of section 3(1) (bb) of the [1972 c. 65] National Debt Act 1972.

(3) The repeal by this Act of the [1978 c. 11] Shipbuilding (Redundancy Payments) Act 1978 and section 1 of the [1985 c. 14] Shipbuilding Act 1985 shall come into force on such day as the Lord Chancellor may by order made by statutory instrument appoint.

=== Repealed enactments ===
Section 1(1) of the act repealed 617 enactments, listed in parts I to XVI of schedule 1 to the act.

==== Part I: Administration of Justice ====
Part I — Administration of Justice
Citation	Short title	Description	Extent of repeal
Group 1 – General Repeals
20 Geo. 2. c. 43	Heritable Jurisdictions (Scotland) Act 1746	Heritable Jurisdictions (Scotland) Act 1746.	Sections 1, 2, 24, 26 and 27.
12 Geo. 3. c. 24	Dockyards, etc. Protection Act 1772	Dockyards, etc. Protection Act 1772.	The whole Act as it applies to the Isle of Man.
32 Geo. 3. c. 56	Servants' Characters Act 1792	Servants' Characters Act 1792.	The whole Act as it applies to Scotland.
32 Geo. 3. c. 56	Servants' Characters Act 1792	Servants' Characters Act 1792.	Section 6 as it applies to England and Wales.
41 Geo. 3. (U.K). c. 79	Public Notaries Act 1801	Public Notaries Act 1801.	Section 16.
1 & 2 Will. 4. c. 32	Game Act 1831	Game Act 1831.	Section 42.
3 & 4 Will. 4. c. 41	Judicial Committee Act 1833	Judicial Committee Act 1833.	Section 9 from “and every such witness” onwards.
6 & 7 Vict. c. 30	Pound-breach Act 1843	Pound-breach Act 1843.	The whole act.
6 & 7 Vict. c. 40	Hosiery Act 1843	Hosiery Act 1843.	The whole act.
10 & 11 Vict. c. 16	Commissioners Clauses Act 1847	Commissioners Clauses Act 1847.	Section 11.
14 & 15 Vict. c. 92	Summary Jurisdiction (Ireland) Act 1851	Summary Jurisdiction (Ireland) Act 1851.	In section 16, paragraph 3.
18 & 19 Vict. c. 90	Crown Suits Act 1855	Crown Suits Act 1855.	The whole act.
20 & 21 Vict. c. 43	Summary Jurisdiction Act 1857	Summary Jurisdiction Act 1857.	The whole act.
20 & 21 Vict. c. 44	Crown Suits (Scotland) Act 1857	Crown Suits (Scotland) Act 1857.	Section 5 from the beginning to “Act; and”.
27 & 28 Vict. c. 25	Naval Prize Act 1864	Naval Prize Act 1864.	Section 50.
29 & 30 Vict. c. 103	Constabulary (Ireland) Act 1866	Constabulary (Ireland) Act 1866.	The whole act.
31 & 32 Vict. c. 37	Documentary Evidence Act 1868	Documentary Evidence Act 1868.	Section 4 except as it applies to Scotland.
33 & 34 Vict. c. 23	Forfeiture Act 1870	Forfeiture Act 1870.	Section 1.
33 & 34 Vict. c. 23	Forfeiture Act 1870	Forfeiture Act 1870.	In section 2, the words “Provided nevertheless, that”.
33 & 34 Vict. c. 23	Forfeiture Act 1870	Forfeiture Act 1870.	Section 5.
34 & 35 Vict. c. 96	Pedlars Act 1871	Pedlars Act 1871.	In section 3, the definition of “court of summary jurisdiction”.
34 & 35 Vict. c. 96	Pedlars Act 1871	Pedlars Act 1871.	Section 20 from “Provided as follows” onwards.
34 & 35 Vict. c. 112	Prevention of Crimes Act 1871	Prevention of Crimes Act 1871.	Section 17 as it applies to Scotland.
37 & 38 Vict. c. 88	Births and Deaths Registration Act 1874	Births and Deaths Registration Act 1874.	Section 45.
38 & 39 Vict. c. 25	Public Stores Act 1875	Public Stores Act 1875.	In section 2, the definition of “court of summary jurisdiction”.
38 & 39 Vict. c. 25	Public Stores Act 1875	Public Stores Act 1875.	In section 4, the words “therein described”.
38 & 39 Vict. c. 25	Public Stores Act 1875	Public Stores Act 1875.	In section 13, as it applies to Great Britain, the words “or to the having in possession or keeping Her Majesty’s stores”.
38 & 39 Vict. c. 25	Public Stores Act 1875	Public Stores Act 1875.	Sections 14, 15, 16 and 18.
38 & 39 Vict. c. 25	Public Stores Act 1875	Public Stores Act 1875.	Schedule 1 except the entry in column 2 beginning “The name”.
39 & 40 Vict. c. clii	Peebles Justiciary District Act 1876	An Act to alter the Justiciary District of the County of Peebles.	The whole act.
44 & 45 Vict. c. 24	Summary Jurisdiction (Process) Act 1881	Summary Jurisdiction (Process) Act 1881.	Section 1 from “This Act shall” onwards.
45 & 46 Vict. c. 9	Documentary Evidence Act 1882	Documentary Evidence Act 1882.	Section 3 except as it applies to Scotland.
49 & 50 Vict. c. 38	Riot (Damages) Act 1886	Riot (Damages) Act 1886.	Section 4(2).
49 & 50 Vict. c. 38	Riot (Damages) Act 1886	Riot (Damages) Act 1886.	In section 9, the definition of “borough”.
49 & 50 Vict. c. 38	Riot (Damages) Act 1886	Riot (Damages) Act 1886.	Section 10.
50 & 51 Vict. c. 55	Sheriffs Act 1887	Sheriffs Act 1887.	Section 14.
55 & 56 Vict. c. 64	Witnesses (Public Inquiries) Protection Act 1892	Witnesses (Public Inquiries) Protection Act 1892.	The following provisions as they apply to England and Wales—
55 & 56 Vict. c. 64	Witnesses (Public Inquiries) Protection Act 1892	Witnesses (Public Inquiries) Protection Act 1892.	Section 4 from “to condemn” to “convicted and” and from “provided that” onwards.
55 & 56 Vict. c. 64	Witnesses (Public Inquiries) Protection Act 1892	Witnesses (Public Inquiries) Protection Act 1892.	Section 5 from “together” to “court”.
2 Edw. 7. c. 8	Cremation Act 1902	Cremation Act 1902.	Section 8(1) from “Provided that” onwards.
7 Edw. 7. c. 16	Evidence (Colonial Statutes) Act 1907	Evidence (Colonial Statutes) Act 1907.	Section 1(2) except as it applies to Scotland.
9 Edw. 7. c. 40	Police Act 1909	Police Act 1909.	Section 6 from “and” (where first occurring) onwards.
4 & 5 Geo. 5. c. 58	Criminal Justice Administration Act 1914	Criminal Justice Administration Act 1914.	Section 38.
10 & 11 Geo. 5. c. 75	Official Secrets Act 1920	Official Secrets Act 1920.	Section 11(1)(a).
10 & 11 Geo. 5. c. 75	Official Secrets Act 1920	Official Secrets Act 1920.	Section 11(3).
23 & 24 Geo. 5. c. 36	Administration of Justice (Miscellaneous Provisions) Act 1933	Administration of Justice (Miscellaneous Provisions) Act 1933.	In section 2(2)(ii), the words “or of being a habitual criminal or a habitual drunkard”.
23 & 24 Geo. 5. c. 36	Administration of Justice (Miscellaneous Provisions) Act 1933	Administration of Justice (Miscellaneous Provisions) Act 1933.	Section 2(7) from the beginning to “aforesaid”.
23 & 24 Geo. 5. c. 36	Administration of Justice (Miscellaneous Provisions) Act 1933	Administration of Justice (Miscellaneous Provisions) Act 1933.	Section 7(3).
8 & 9 Geo. 6. c. 16	Limitation (Enemies and War Prisoners) Act 1945	Limitation (Enemies and War Prisoners) Act 1945.	In sections 2(1) and 4(a), the reference to section 4 of the Employers' Liability Act 1880.
8 & 9 Geo. 6. c. 16	Limitation (Enemies and War Prisoners) Act 1945	Limitation (Enemies and War Prisoners) Act 1945.	In section 4(a), the reference to section 1 of the Public Authorities Protection Act 1893.
10 & 11 Geo. 6. c. 44	Crown Proceedings Act 1947	Crown Proceedings Act 1947.	Section 24(4).
10 & 11 Geo. 6. c. 44	Crown Proceedings Act 1947	Crown Proceedings Act 1947.	Section 25(5).
10 & 11 Geo. 6. c. 44	Crown Proceedings Act 1947	Crown Proceedings Act 1947.	Section 26(1) from “This subsection” onwards.
10 & 11 Geo. 6. c. 44	Crown Proceedings Act 1947	Crown Proceedings Act 1947.	Section 36.
10 & 11 Geo. 6. c. 44	Crown Proceedings Act 1947	Crown Proceedings Act 1947.	Section 51(1).
14 & 15 Geo. 6. c. 33	Fraudulent Mediums Act 1951	Fraudulent Mediums Act 1951.	Section 2.
14 & 15 Geo. 6. c. 39	Common Informers Act 1951	Common Informers Act 1951.	In the Schedule, the entry relating to the Public Notaries Act 1843.
15 & 16 Geo. 6 & 1 Eliz. 2. c. 52	Prison Act 1952	Prison Act 1952.	Section 54(1).
15 & 16 Geo. 6 & 1 Eliz. 2. c. 52	Prison Act 1952	Prison Act 1952.	Section 55(3).
15 & 16 Geo. 6 & 1 Eliz. 2. c. 52	Prison Act 1952	Prison Act 1952.	In section 55(4) the words “the last preceding subsection or”.
15 & 16 Geo. 6 & 1 Eliz. 2. c. 52	Prison Act 1952	Prison Act 1952.	Schedule 3.
1954 c. 11 (N.I.)	Common Informers Act (Northern Ireland) 1954	Common Informers Act (Northern Ireland) 1954.	In the Schedule, the entries relating to the Expiring Laws Act (Ireland) 1761, the Recognisances (Ireland) Act 1817, the Public Notaries (Ireland) Act 1821, and the Clerk of Assize (Ireland) Act 1821.
4 & 5 Eliz. 2. c. 69	Sexual Offences Act 1956	Sexual Offences Act 1956.	Section 54(1) from “except” onwards.
4 & 5 Eliz. 2. c. 69	Sexual Offences Act 1956	Sexual Offences Act 1956.	Section 54(2) from “and” onwards.
4 & 5 Eliz. 2. c. 69	Sexual Offences Act 1956	Sexual Offences Act 1956.	In Schedule 3, the entry relating to section 15 of the Children and Young Persons Act 1933.
8 & 9 Eliz. 2. c. 65	Administration of Justice Act 1960	Administration of Justice Act 1960.	Section 19(1).
8 & 9 Eliz. 2. c. 65	Administration of Justice Act 1960	Administration of Justice Act 1960.	Schedule 3.
9 & 10 Eliz. 2. c. 39	Criminal Justice Act 1961	Criminal Justice Act 1961.	Section 41(3) and (4).
9 & 10 Eliz. 2. c. 39	Criminal Justice Act 1961	Criminal Justice Act 1961.	In section 42(1) the words “Fifth and Sixth”.
9 & 10 Eliz. 2. c. 39	Criminal Justice Act 1961	Criminal Justice Act 1961.	In section 42(2) the words “and Sixth”.
9 & 10 Eliz. 2. c. 39	Criminal Justice Act 1961	Criminal Justice Act 1961.	In Schedule 4, the entry relating to the Prisons (Scotland) Act 1952.
10 & 11 Eliz. 2. c. 30	Northern Ireland Act 1962	Northern Ireland Act 1962.	In Schedule 2, the entry relating to the Public Stores Act 1875.
1964 c. iv	City of London (Courts) Act 1964	City of London (Courts) Act 1964.	Sections 2, 3, 22 and 23.
1964 c. iv	City of London (Courts) Act 1964	City of London (Courts) Act 1964.	The Schedule.
1967 c. 80	Criminal Justice Act 1967	Criminal Justice Act 1967.	In section 104(1), the definitions of “explosive”, “firearm”, “imitation firearm” and “offensive weapon”.
1967 c. 80	Criminal Justice Act 1967	Criminal Justice Act 1967.	In Part I of Schedule 3, the entries relating to 1 & 2 Wm.4 c.43, the Pound-breach Act 1843, the Slaughter of Animals (Scotland) Act 1928, the Local Government Act 1933, the Prisons (Scotland) Act 1952 and the Mental Health (Scotland) Act 1960.
1967 c. 80	Criminal Justice Act 1967	Criminal Justice Act 1967.	In Part II of Schedule 3, the entries relating to the Local Government Act 1933 and the Local Government (Scotland) Act 1947.
1967 c. 80	Criminal Justice Act 1967	Criminal Justice Act 1967.	In Schedule 5, paragraphs 1, 2, 15, 16 and 17.
1971 c. 23	Courts Act 1971	Courts Act 1971.	In Schedule 8, paragraphs 35 and 41.
1971 c. 48	Criminal Damage Act 1971	Criminal Damage Act 1971.	Section 11(2),(3) and (5).
1971 c. 48	Criminal Damage Act 1971	Criminal Damage Act 1971.	Section 12(4) and (5).
1972 c. 71	Criminal Justice Act 1972	Criminal Justice Act 1972.	In Schedule 5— (a) paragraph (a) of the entry relating to the Criminal Justice Act 1967; (b) the entry relating to the Road Traffic Act 1972.
SI 1975/834	Act of Adjournal (High Court Sittings and Juries) 1975	Act of Adjournal (High Court Sittings and Juries) 1975.	Section 6.
SI 1975/834	Act of Adjournal (High Court Sittings and Juries) 1975	Act of Adjournal (High Court Sittings and Juries) 1975.	In the Schedule, the entries in column IV.
1977 c. 45	Criminal Law Act 1977	Criminal Law Act 1977.	Section 15(2) and (3).
1977 c. 45	Criminal Law Act 1977	Criminal Law Act 1977.	Section 17.
1980 c. 43	Magistrates' Courts Act 1980	Magistrates' Courts Act 1980.	In Schedule 7, paragraph 1.
1980 c. 55	Law Reform (Miscellaneous Provisions) (Scotland) Act 1980	Law Reform (Miscellaneous Provisions) (Scotland) Act 1980.	Section 15.
1980 c. 55	Law Reform (Miscellaneous Provisions) (Scotland) Act 1980	Law Reform (Miscellaneous Provisions) (Scotland) Act 1980.	Section 16 from “Subject” to “below”.
1980 c. 55	Law Reform (Miscellaneous Provisions) (Scotland) Act 1980	Law Reform (Miscellaneous Provisions) (Scotland) Act 1980.	Section 29(2) from “and different dates” onwards.
1985 c. 44	Sexual Offences Act 1985	Sexual Offences Act 1985.	In section 1(1), the words “subject to section 5(6) below.”
1985 c. 44	Sexual Offences Act 1985	Sexual Offences Act 1985.	Section 5(6).
1985 c. 65	Insolvency Act 1985	Insolvency Act 1985.	In Schedule 8, paragraph 28 and paragraph 38(2) and (3).
Group 2 – Piracy
11 Will. 3. c. 7	Piracy Act 1698	Piracy Act 1698.	The whole act.
8 Geo. 1. c. 24	Piracy Act 1721	Piracy Act 1721.	The whole act.
18 Geo. 2. c. 30	Piracy Act 1744	Piracy Act 1744.	The whole act.
Group 3 – Mitigation of Penalties
8 & 9 Vict. c. 16	Companies Clauses Consolidation Act 1845	Companies Clauses Consolidation Act 1845.	Section 126.
8 & 9 Vict. c. 17	Companies Clauses Consolidation (Scotland) Act 1845	Companies Clauses Consolidation (Scotland) Act 1845.	Section 129.
10 & 11 Vict. c. 14	Markets and Fairs Clauses Act 1847	Markets and Fairs Clauses Act 1847.	Section 43 from “provided that” onwards.
10 & 11 Vict. c. 16	Commissioners Clauses Act 1847	Commissioners Clauses Act 1847.	Section 98.
10 & 11 Vict. c. 27	Harbours, Docks and Piers Clauses Act 1847	Harbours, Docks and Piers Clauses Act 1847.	Section 84 from “provided always” onwards.
27 & 28 Vict. c. 110	Limited Penalties Act 1864	Limited Penalties Act 1864.	The whole act.
28 & 29 Vict. c. 125	Dockyard Ports Regulation Act 1865	Dockyard Ports Regulation Act 1865.	Section 6 from “but” onwards.
34 & 35 Vict. c. cciv	Wimbledon and Putney Commons Act 1871	Wimbledon and Putney Commons Act 1871.	Section 87 from “so as” onwards.
38 & 39 Vict. c. 86	Conspiracy and Protection of Property Act 1875	Conspiracy and Protection of Property Act 1875.	Section 8.
Group 4 – Summary Jurisdiction Process
53 & 54 Vict. c. 59	Public Health Acts Amendment Act 1890	Public Health Acts Amendment Act 1890.	Section 8.
7 Edw. 7. c. 53	Public Health Acts Amendment Act 1907	Public Health Acts Amendment Act 1907.	Section 8.
26 Geo. 5 & 1 Edw. 8. c. 49	Public Health Act 1936	Public Health Act 1936.	Section 299.
1980 c. 66	Highways Act 1980	Highways Act 1980.	Section 313.
1984 c. 22	Public Health (Control of Disease) Act 1984	Public Health (Control of Disease) Act 1984.	Section 66.
1984 c. 55	Building Act 1984	Building Act 1984.	Section 109.
1993 c. 11	Clean Air Act 1993	Clean Air Act 1993.	In section 62(1), the entry relating to section 299 of the Public Health Act 1936.

==== Part II: Agriculture, Fisheries and Food ====
Part II — Agriculture, Fisheries and Food
Citation	Short title	Description	Extent of repeal
11 Geo. 3. c. 31	White Herring Fisheries Act 1771	White Herring Fisheries Act 1771.	Section 13.
10 & 11 Vict. c. 14	Markets and Fairs Clauses Act 1847	Markets and Fairs Clauses Act 1847.	Sections 15 and 20.
31 & 32 Vict. c. 45	Sea Fisheries Act 1868	Sea Fisheries Act 1868.	Section 65.
38 & 39 Vict. c. 18	Seal Fishery Act 1875	Seal Fishery Act 1875.	Section 3 except the paragraph beginning “For all purposes”.
45 & 46 Vict. c. 37	Corn Returns Act 1882	Corn Returns Act 1882.	Section 17.
52 & 53 Vict. c. 30	Board of Agriculture Act 1889	Board of Agriculture Act 1889.	Part II of Schedule 1, except the entries for the Improvement of Land Act 1864, the Lands Improvement Company’s Act 1853 and the Somersetshire Drainage Act 1877.
2 & 3 Geo. 5. c. 10	Seal Fisheries (North Pacific) Act 1912	Seal Fisheries (North Pacific) Act 1912.	In section 5(1), the words “to any British protectorate” and the proviso.
2 & 3 Geo. 5. c. 10	Seal Fisheries (North Pacific) Act 1912	Seal Fisheries (North Pacific) Act 1912.	Section 5(2).
9 & 10 Geo. 5. c. 59	Land Settlement (Facilities) Act 1919	Land Settlement (Facilities) Act 1919.	Section 6.
9 & 10 Geo. 5. c. 59	Land Settlement (Facilities) Act 1919	Land Settlement (Facilities) Act 1919.	Section 27.
9 & 10 Geo. 5. c. 59	Land Settlement (Facilities) Act 1919	Land Settlement (Facilities) Act 1919.	Section 31.
15 & 16 Geo. 5. c. 85	Land Settlement (Facilities) Amendment Act 1925	Land Settlement (Facilities) Amendment Act 1925.	The whole act.
16 & 17 Geo. 5. c. 52	Small Holdings and Allotments Act 1926	Small Holdings and Allotments Act 1926.	In section 2(2), the words “out of Small Holdings and Allotments Account”.
16 & 17 Geo. 5. c. 52	Small Holdings and Allotments Act 1926	Small Holdings and Allotments Act 1926.	Section 7(5).
16 & 17 Geo. 5. c. 52	Small Holdings and Allotments Act 1926	Small Holdings and Allotments Act 1926.	Section 9 from “and any sum” to “Public Health Acts”.
2 & 3 Geo. 6. c. 43	Prevention of Damage by Rabbits Act 1939	Prevention of Damage by Rabbits Act 1939.	Section 6(2).
3 & 4 Geo. 6. c. 14	Agriculture (Miscellaneous War Provisions) Act 1940	Agriculture (Miscellaneous War Provisions) Act 1940.	The whole act.
3 & 4 Geo. 6. c. 50	Agriculture (Miscellaneous War Provisions) (No.2) Act 1940	Agriculture (Miscellaneous War Provisions) (No.2) Act 1940.	The whole act.
4 & 5 Geo. 6. c. 50	Agriculture (Miscellaneous Provisions) Act 1941	Agriculture (Miscellaneous Provisions) Act 1941.	The whole act.
9 & 10 Geo. 6. c. 73	Hill Farming Act 1946	Hill Farming Act 1946.	Section 40(4).
10 & 11 Geo. 6. c. 48	Agriculture Act 1947	Agriculture Act 1947.	Section 96.
14 & 15 Geo. 6. c. 30	Sea Fish Industry Act 1951	Sea Fish Industry Act 1951.	Section 27.
14 & 15 Geo. 6. c. 39	Common Informers Act 1951	Common Informers Act 1951.	In the Schedule, the entry relating to the Seal Fishery Act 1875.
1954 c. 11 (N.I.)	Common Informers Act (Northern Ireland) 1954	Common Informers Act (Northern Ireland) 1954.	In the Schedule, the entry relating to the Seal Fishery Act 1875.
2 & 3 Eliz. 2. c. 39	Agriculture (Miscellaneous Provisions) Act 1954	Agriculture (Miscellaneous Provisions) Act 1954.	Section 1.
2 & 3 Eliz. 2. c. 39	Agriculture (Miscellaneous Provisions) Act 1954	Agriculture (Miscellaneous Provisions) Act 1954.	Section 14(2)(d).
2 & 3 Eliz. 2. c. 39	Agriculture (Miscellaneous Provisions) Act 1954	Agriculture (Miscellaneous Provisions) Act 1954.	In section 16, the words “except section two”.
8 & 9 Eliz. 2. c. 22	Horticulture Act 1960	Horticulture Act 1960.	Part I.
1964 c. 28	Agriculture and Horticulture Act 1964	Agriculture and Horticulture Act 1964.	Parts I and II.
1964 c. 28	Agriculture and Horticulture Act 1964	Agriculture and Horticulture Act 1964.	Section 25.
1964 c. 28	Agriculture and Horticulture Act 1964	Agriculture and Horticulture Act 1964.	The Schedule.
1964 c. 72	Fishery Limits Act 1964	Fishery Limits Act 1964.	In Schedule 1, the entry relating to the Whale Fisheries (Scotland) Act 1907.
1967 c. 22	Agriculture Act 1967	Agriculture Act 1967.	Section 3(1)(b) and the preceding “or”.
1967 c. 22	Agriculture Act 1967	Agriculture Act 1967.	Section 3(3)(b) and the preceding “or”.
1967 c. 22	Agriculture Act 1967	Agriculture Act 1967.	Section 26(11)(c).
1968 c. 34	Agriculture (Miscellaneous Provisions) Act 1968	Agriculture (Miscellaneous Provisions) Act 1968.	Section 41(1).
1970 c. 40	Agriculture Act 1970	Agriculture Act 1970.	Section 31.
1970 c. 40	Agriculture Act 1970	Agriculture Act 1970.	Section 34(2)(a) and (c).
1970 c. 40	Agriculture Act 1970	Agriculture Act 1970.	Section 65(1) from “and different days” onwards.
1970 c. 40	Agriculture Act 1970	Agriculture Act 1970.	In Schedule 3, paragraph 6.
1974 c. 3	Slaughterhouses Act 1974	Slaughterhouses Act 1974.	In Schedule 3, paragraph 2.
1976 c. 86	Fishery Limits Act 1976	Fishery Limits Act 1976.	In Schedule 2, paragraphs 8 and 13.
1979 c. 2	Customs and Excise Management Act 1979	Customs and Excise Management Act 1979.	In Schedule 4, in the Table in paragraph 12, the entries relating to the Agriculture and Horticulture Act 1964.
1979 c. 3	Customs and Excise Duties (General Reliefs) Act 1979	Customs and Excise Duties (General Reliefs) Act 1979.	In Schedule 2, paragraph 1.
1985 c. 48	Food and Environment Protection Act 1985	Food and Environment Protection Act 1985.	In section 5(g), the words “or(d)”.
1985 c. 51	Local Government Act 1985	Local Government Act 1985.	Section 64(1).
1985 c. 51	Local Government Act 1985	Local Government Act 1985.	In section 64(4), the words “to the Minister of Agriculture, Fisheries and Food or” and “as the case may be”.
1986 c. 5	Agricultural Holdings Act 1986	Agricultural Holdings Act 1986.	In Schedule 14, paragraphs 8 and 35.
1988 c. 9	Local Government Act 1988	Local Government Act 1988.	Section 36.
1991 c. 55	Agricultural Holdings (Scotland) Act 1991	Agricultural Holdings (Scotland) Act 1991.	In Schedule 11, paragraph 22.

==== Part III: Allotment Law ====
Part III — Allotment Law
Citation	Short title	Description	Extent of repeal
2 & 3 Will. 4. c. 42	Allotments Act 1832	Allotments Act 1832.	The whole act.
36 & 37 Vict. c. 19	Poor Allotments Management Act 1873	Poor Allotments Management Act 1873.	The whole act.
45 & 46 Vict. c. 80	Allotments Extension Act 1882	Allotments Extension Act 1882.	The whole act.
55 & 56 Vict. c. 54	Allotments (Scotland) Act 1892	Allotments (Scotland) Act 1892.	In section 16, the definition of “Public Health (Scotland) Acts”.
8 Edw. 7. c. 36	Small Holdings and Allotments Act 1908	Small Holdings and Allotments Act 1908.	In section 27(5) the words “or fine”.
8 Edw. 7. c. 36	Small Holdings and Allotments Act 1908	Small Holdings and Allotments Act 1908.	Section 35(3).
8 Edw. 7. c. 36	Small Holdings and Allotments Act 1908	Small Holdings and Allotments Act 1908.	Section 38 from “and section one hundred” onwards.
8 Edw. 7. c. 36	Small Holdings and Allotments Act 1908	Small Holdings and Allotments Act 1908.	Section 49(3) from “except” onwards.
8 Edw. 7. c. 36	Small Holdings and Allotments Act 1908	Small Holdings and Allotments Act 1908.	In section 49(4) the words “out of the Small Holdings Account”.
8 Edw. 7. c. 36	Small Holdings and Allotments Act 1908	Small Holdings and Allotments Act 1908.	Section 60.
8 Edw. 7. c. 36	Small Holdings and Allotments Act 1908	Small Holdings and Allotments Act 1908.	Section 61(3) from “in the enfranchisement” to “allotments, or”.
8 Edw. 7. c. 36	Small Holdings and Allotments Act 1908	Small Holdings and Allotments Act 1908.	Section 62.
9 & 10 Geo. 5. c. 59	Land Settlement (Facilities) Act 1919	Land Settlement (Facilities) Act 1919.	Section 21(5).
9 & 10 Geo. 5. c. 97	Land Settlement (Scotland) Act 1919	Land Settlement (Scotland) Act 1919.	Section 22(3).
12 & 13 Geo. 5. c. 51	Allotments Act 1922	Allotments Act 1922.	Section 1(1)(d) from “being” to “let by a local authority”.
12 & 13 Geo. 5. c. 51	Allotments Act 1922	Allotments Act 1922.	Section 1(2) and (3).
12 & 13 Geo. 5. c. 51	Allotments Act 1922	Allotments Act 1922.	Section 3(6).
12 & 13 Geo. 5. c. 51	Allotments Act 1922	Allotments Act 1922.	Section 7 from “to any land” (where first occurring) to “enactment, or”.
12 & 13 Geo. 5. c. 51	Allotments Act 1922	Allotments Act 1922.	Section 8(2).
12 & 13 Geo. 5. c. 51	Allotments Act 1922	Allotments Act 1922.	Section 10(1) from “or the council” to “1908”.
12 & 13 Geo. 5. c. 51	Allotments Act 1922	Allotments Act 1922.	Section 10(6)(b), and the preceding “or”.
12 & 13 Geo. 5. c. 51	Allotments Act 1922	Allotments Act 1922.	Sections 17 and 19.
12 & 13 Geo. 5. c. 51	Allotments Act 1922	Allotments Act 1922.	In section 22(1), the definitions of “Minister” and “sinking fund charges”.
12 & 13 Geo. 5. c. 51	Allotments Act 1922	Allotments Act 1922.	Section 22(2).
12 & 13 Geo. 5. c. 52	Allotments (Scotland) Act 1922	Allotments (Scotland) Act 1922.	In section 1(1), paragraph (c) from “or in the case” onwards.
12 & 13 Geo. 5. c. 52	Allotments (Scotland) Act 1922	Allotments (Scotland) Act 1922.	Section 8(2).
12 & 13 Geo. 5. c. 52	Allotments (Scotland) Act 1922	Allotments (Scotland) Act 1922.	In section 19(1), the definitions of “the Act of 1894”, “the Act of 1919” and “sinking fund charges”; and the words from “References” onwards.
12 & 13 Geo. 5. c. 52	Allotments (Scotland) Act 1922	Allotments (Scotland) Act 1922.	Section 21(1) from “and the Act of 1892” onwards.
15 & 16 Geo. 5. c. 61	Allotments Act 1925	Allotments Act 1925.	In section 1, the definition of “Commissioners”.
15 & 16 Geo. 5. c. 61	Allotments Act 1925	Allotments Act 1925.	Section 3.
15 & 16 Geo. 5. c. 61	Allotments Act 1925	Allotments Act 1925.	Section 5 from “after consultation” to “Fisheries”.
15 & 16 Geo. 5. c. 61	Allotments Act 1925	Allotments Act 1925.	Section 7 from “unless” onwards.
15 & 16 Geo. 5. c. 61	Allotments Act 1925	Allotments Act 1925.	Section 8 from “after consultation” to “Health” and from “and where” onwards.
15 & 16 Geo. 5. c. 61	Allotments Act 1925	Allotments Act 1925.	Sections 10 and 11.
21 & 22 Geo. 5. c. 41	Agricultural Land (Utilisation) Act 1931	Agricultural Land (Utilisation) Act 1931.	Section 11.
21 & 22 Geo. 5. c. 41	Agricultural Land (Utilisation) Act 1931	Agricultural Land (Utilisation) Act 1931.	Sections 13 to 16.
21 & 22 Geo. 5. c. 41	Agricultural Land (Utilisation) Act 1931	Agricultural Land (Utilisation) Act 1931.	Sections 18, 19, 21 and 23.
21 & 22 Geo. 5. c. 41	Agricultural Land (Utilisation) Act 1931	Agricultural Land (Utilisation) Act 1931.	Section 24(a) and (c).
14 Geo. 6. c. 31	Allotments Act 1950	Allotments Act 1950.	Section 4(4).
1963 c. 33	London Government Act 1963	London Government Act 1963.	Section 55(4) from “and in” onwards.
1967 c. 80	Criminal Justice Act 1967	Criminal Justice Act 1967.	In Part I of Schedule 3, the entry relating to the Allotments Act 1922.
1973 c. 65	Local Government (Scotland) Act 1973	Local Government (Scotland) Act 1973.	In Part II of Schedule 27, paragraph 78.
1993 c. 10	Charities Act 1993	Charities Act 1993.	In Schedule 4, paragraph 1(c).

==== Part IV: Commons and Open Spaces ====
Part IV — Commons and Open Spaces
Citation	Short title	Description	Extent of repeal
8 & 9 Vict. c. 118	Inclosure Act 1845	Inclosure Act 1845.	Sections 58 and 166.
8 & 9 Vict. c. 118	Inclosure Act 1845	Inclosure Act 1845.	In section 167, the definitions of “county” and “parish”.
11 & 12 Vict. c. 99	Inclosure Act 1848	Inclosure Act 1848.	Section 10.
15 & 16 Vict. c. 79	Inclosure Act 1852	Inclosure Act 1852.	Section 28.
26 & 27 Vict. c. 13	Town Gardens Protection Act 1863	Town Gardens Protection Act 1863.	Section 4 from “before a magistrate” to “situate”.
26 & 27 Vict. c. 13	Town Gardens Protection Act 1863	Town Gardens Protection Act 1863.	Section 6.
34 & 35 Vict. c. cciv	Wimbledon and Putney Commons Act 1871	Wimbledon and Putney Commons Act 1871.	Section 7.
34 & 35 Vict. c. cciv	Wimbledon and Putney Commons Act 1871	Wimbledon and Putney Commons Act 1871.	Sections 9 to 11.
34 & 35 Vict. c. cciv	Wimbledon and Putney Commons Act 1871	Wimbledon and Putney Commons Act 1871.	In section 12, the words “other than the first”.
34 & 35 Vict. c. cciv	Wimbledon and Putney Commons Act 1871	Wimbledon and Putney Commons Act 1871.	Section 33.
34 & 35 Vict. c. cciv	Wimbledon and Putney Commons Act 1871	Wimbledon and Putney Commons Act 1871.	Sections 40 to 67.
34 & 35 Vict. c. cciv	Wimbledon and Putney Commons Act 1871	Wimbledon and Putney Commons Act 1871.	Sections 69, 70, 72 and 73.
34 & 35 Vict. c. cciv	Wimbledon and Putney Commons Act 1871	Wimbledon and Putney Commons Act 1871.	Section 80 from “except” to “aforesaid”.
34 & 35 Vict. c. cciv	Wimbledon and Putney Commons Act 1871	Wimbledon and Putney Commons Act 1871.	In section 84— (a) the paragraph beginning “For the keeping”; (b) the next paragraph from “or with the use” to “Act”; (c) the proviso from “to the National” to “ranges, and”.
34 & 35 Vict. c. cciv	Wimbledon and Putney Commons Act 1871	Wimbledon and Putney Commons Act 1871.	Section 94.
34 & 35 Vict. c. cciv	Wimbledon and Putney Commons Act 1871	Wimbledon and Putney Commons Act 1871.	Sections 104 to 107.
34 & 35 Vict. c. cciv	Wimbledon and Putney Commons Act 1871	Wimbledon and Putney Commons Act 1871.	Section 110.
35 & 36 Vict. c. 15	Parks Regulation Act 1872	Parks Regulation Act 1872.	Section 6 from “and in default” to “six months” (where first occurring).
35 & 36 Vict. c. 15	Parks Regulation Act 1872	Parks Regulation Act 1872.	Section 15.
39 & 40 Vict. c. 20	Statute Law Revision (Substituted Enactments) Act 1876	Statute Law Revision (Substituted Enactments) Act 1876.	The whole act.
50 & 51 Vict. c. 32	Open Spaces Act 1887	Open Spaces Act 1887.	The whole act.
6 Edw. 7. c. 25	Open Spaces Act 1906	Open Spaces Act 1906.	Section 21(1)(a).
6 Edw. 7. c. 25	Open Spaces Act 1906	Open Spaces Act 1906.	Section 23(b) and the preceding “and”.
1978 c. 45	Statute Law (Repeals) Act 1978	Statute Law (Repeals) Act 1978.	In Part XIV of Schedule 1, the entry relating to 17 Geo.3. c.17.

==== Part V: Companies ====
Part V — Companies
Citation	Short title	Description	Extent of repeal
Group 1 – General Repeals
19 Hen. 7. c. 7	Ordinances of Corporations Act 1503	Ordinances of Corporations Act 1503.	The whole act.
7 Will. 4 & 1 Vict. c. 73	Chartered Companies Act 1837	Chartered Companies Act 1837.	The whole act.
8 & 9 Vict. c. 16	Companies Clauses Consolidation Act 1845	Companies Clauses Consolidation Act 1845.	In section 18, the words “or in consequence of the marriage of a female shareholder”.
8 & 9 Vict. c. 16	Companies Clauses Consolidation Act 1845	Companies Clauses Consolidation Act 1845.	Section 19 from the beginning to “share; and”; and the words “in either of the cases aforesaid”.
8 & 9 Vict. c. 17	Companies Clauses Consolidation (Scotland) Act 1845	Companies Clauses Consolidation (Scotland) Act 1845.	In section 19, the words “or in consequence of the marriage of a female shareholder”.
8 & 9 Vict. c. 17	Companies Clauses Consolidation (Scotland) Act 1845	Companies Clauses Consolidation (Scotland) Act 1845.	Section 20 from the beginning to “share; and”; and the words “in either of the cases aforesaid”.
26 & 27 Vict. c. 118	Companies Clauses Act 1863	Companies Clauses Act 1863.	Section 2.
47 & 48 Vict. c. 56	Chartered Companies Act 1884	Chartered Companies Act 1884.	The whole act.
14 & 15 Geo. 6. c. 65	Reserve and Auxiliary Forces (Protection of Civil Interests) Act 1951	Reserve and Auxiliary Forces (Protection of Civil Interests) Act 1951.	In section 2(6) as it applies to England and Wales— (a) paragraph (b) and the preceding “or”; (b) the words from “In this subsection” onwards.
14 & 15 Geo. 6. c. 65	Reserve and Auxiliary Forces (Protection of Civil Interests) Act 1951	Reserve and Auxiliary Forces (Protection of Civil Interests) Act 1951.	In section 8(5)— (a) paragraph (b) and the preceding “or”; (b) the words from “In this subsection” onwards.
Group 2 – Insurance Companies
39 & 40 Vict. c. 36	Customs Consolidation Act 1876	Customs Consolidation Act 1876.	Section 285 from “and the Life Assurance Companies Act 1870” onwards.
1973 c. 58	Insurance Companies Amendment Act 1973	Insurance Companies Amendment Act 1973.	Section 54.
1973 c. 58	Insurance Companies Amendment Act 1973	Insurance Companies Amendment Act 1973.	Schedule 1.
1974 c. 49	Insurance Companies Act 1974	Insurance Companies Act 1974.	The whole act.
1975 c. 75	Policyholders Protection Act 1975	Policyholders Protection Act 1975.	Section 30.
1980 c. 25	Insurance Companies Act 1980	Insurance Companies Act 1980.	Sections 1 and 3.
1980 c. 25	Insurance Companies Act 1980	Insurance Companies Act 1980.	Section 4(2), (3) and (4).
1980 c. 25	Insurance Companies Act 1980	Insurance Companies Act 1980.	Schedule 2.
1980 c. 25	Insurance Companies Act 1980	Insurance Companies Act 1980.	In Schedule 3, paragraphs 1, 2 and 10 to 14.
1980 c. 25	Insurance Companies Act 1980	Insurance Companies Act 1980.	Schedules 4, 5 and 6.
1981 c. 31	Insurance Companies Act 1981	Insurance Companies Act 1981.	In Schedule 4, paragraphs 18 and 24.
1982 c. 50	Insurance Companies Act 1982	Insurance Companies Act 1982.	In Schedule 4— (a) paragraphs 2, 3, 4, 5, 9, 12, 13, 16, 20 and 21; (b) paragraph 6 from “If” to “above” and “27 or”; (c) paragraph 15 from “section 51(2)” to “1974 or”.
1982 c. 50	Insurance Companies Act 1982	Insurance Companies Act 1982.	In Schedule 5, paragraphs 1, 6, 23 and 26.

==== Part VI: Ecclesiastical Law ====
Part VI — Ecclesiastical Law
Citation	Short title	Description	Extent of repeal
6 & 7 Will. 4. c. 77	Ecclesiastical Commissioners Act 1836	Ecclesiastical Commissioners Act 1836.	Section 15 from “in the month” onwards.
1 & 2 Vict. c. 106	Pluralities Act 1838	Pluralities Act 1838.	Section 80 from “Provided always” onwards.
1 & 2 Vict. c. 106	Pluralities Act 1838	Pluralities Act 1838.	In section 127, the words “or feme covert” and from “or husband” to “writing)”.
3 & 4 Vict. c. 113	Ecclesiastical Commissioners Act 1840	Ecclesiastical Commissioners Act 1840.	Section 76.
3 & 4 Vict. c. 113	Ecclesiastical Commissioners Act 1840	Ecclesiastical Commissioners Act 1840.	Section 85.
3 & 4 Vict. c. 113	Ecclesiastical Commissioners Act 1840	Ecclesiastical Commissioners Act 1840.	Section 87 from “in the month” onwards.
3 & 4 Vict. c. 113	Ecclesiastical Commissioners Act 1840	Ecclesiastical Commissioners Act 1840.	Section 93 from “and the term” onwards.
5 & 6 Vict. c. 27	Ecclesiastical Leases Act 1842	Ecclesiastical Leases Act 1842.	The whole Act as it applies to the Isle of Man.
10 & 11 Vict. c. 65	Cemeteries Clauses Act 1847	Cemeteries Clauses Act 1847.	Section 31.
10 & 11 Vict. c. 65	Cemeteries Clauses Act 1847	Cemeteries Clauses Act 1847.	Section 55 from “and if any” onwards.
22 & 23 Vict. c. 46	Episcopal and Capitular Estates Act 1859	Episcopal and Capitular Estates Act 1859.	The whole act.
23 & 24 Vict. c. 93	Tithe Act 1860	Tithe Act 1860.	Section 19.
29 & 30 Vict. c. 111	Ecclesiastical Commissioners Act 1866	Ecclesiastical Commissioners Act 1866.	Section 22.
47 & 48 Vict. c. 72	Disused Burial Grounds Act 1884	Disused Burial Grounds Act 1884.	Section 4.
54 & 55 Vict. c. 8	Tithe Act 1891	Tithe Act 1891.	The whole act.
16 & 17 Geo. 5. No. 5	First Fruits and Tenths Measure 1926	First Fruits and Tenths Measure 1926.	The whole measure.
24 & 25 Geo. 5. c. 40	Administration of Justice (Appeals) Act 1934	Administration of Justice (Appeals) Act 1934.	In Part I of the Schedule, the entry relating to the Tithe Act 1891.
1963 No. 2	Cathedrals Measure 1963	Cathedrals Measure 1963.	In section 19(3), the words “and eighty-five”.

==== Part VII: Explosives ====
Part VII — Explosives
Citation	Short title	Description	Extent of repeal
38 & 39 Vict. c. 17	Explosives Act 1875	Explosives Act 1875.	In section 14, the words— (a) from the paragraph beginning “The occupier” to “seventy-five” (where first occurring); (b) from the paragraph beginning “Where a licence” to “passing of this Act” (where last occurring).
38 & 39 Vict. c. 17	Explosives Act 1875	Explosives Act 1875.	In section 20, the paragraphs beginning “The occupier” and “The local authority”.
38 & 39 Vict. c. 17	Explosives Act 1875	Explosives Act 1875.	In section 24, as it applies to Great Britain, the words from “or if” to “award”.
38 & 39 Vict. c. 17	Explosives Act 1875	Explosives Act 1875.	In section 72, as it applies to Great Britain, the words “other than justices in petty sessions”, “urban sanitary” and “and in the case of Improvement Commissioners, of the Local Government Board”.
38 & 39 Vict. c. 17	Explosives Act 1875	Explosives Act 1875.	In section 75, as it applies to Northern Ireland, the words “any chief officer of police”.
38 & 39 Vict. c. 17	Explosives Act 1875	Explosives Act 1875.	Sections 93 and 94.
38 & 39 Vict. c. 17	Explosives Act 1875	Explosives Act 1875.	Section 108 from “the expression “county”” to “such district”.
38 & 39 Vict. c. 17	Explosives Act 1875	Explosives Act 1875.	Section 109(2) to (6),(8) and (9).
38 & 39 Vict. c. 17	Explosives Act 1875	Explosives Act 1875.	Section 114(b), (d) and (f).
38 & 39 Vict. c. 17	Explosives Act 1875	Explosives Act 1875.	Sections 120 and 121.
1966 c. 42	Local Government Act 1966	Local Government Act 1966.	In Part II of Schedule 3, paragraphs 9, 17 and 18.
1966 c. 51	Local Government (Scotland) Act 1966	Local Government (Scotland) Act 1966.	In Part II of Schedule 4, paragraphs 6, 15 and 16.
1967 c. 80	Criminal Justice Act 1967	Criminal Justice Act 1967.	In Part I of Schedule 3, the entries relating to the Petroleum (Consolidation) Act 1928.
1971 c. 23	Courts Act 1971	Courts Act 1971.	In Schedule 8, paragraphs 12 and 21.
1971 c. 23	Courts Act 1971	Courts Act 1971.	In Part I of Schedule 9, the entry relating to the Explosives Act 1875.

==== Part VIII: Family Law ====
Part VIII — Family Law
Citation	Short title	Description	Extent of repeal
7 Edw. 7. c. 40	Notification of Births Act 1907	Notification of Births Act 1907.	The whole Act as it applies to Scotland, except sections 1 and 6.
7 Edw. 7. c. 40	Notification of Births Act 1907	Notification of Births Act 1907.	Section 5 from “the Local” (where first occurring) to “Board, and”.
5 & 6 Geo. 5. c. 64	Notification of Births (Extension) Act 1915	Notification of Births (Extension) Act 1915.	The whole act.
23 & 24 Geo. 5. c. 12	Children and Young Persons Act 1933	Children and Young Persons Act 1933.	Section 108(5) from “(except” to “1932)”.
23 & 24 Geo. 5. c. 12	Children and Young Persons Act 1933	Children and Young Persons Act 1933.	Section 108(6).
23 & 24 Geo. 5. c. 12	Children and Young Persons Act 1933	Children and Young Persons Act 1933.	In Schedule 5, paragraphs 3 to 15.
12, 13 & 14 Geo. 6. c. 98	Adoption of Children Act 1949	Adoption of Children Act 1949.	The whole act.
14 Geo. 6. c. 37	Maintenance Orders Act 1950	Maintenance Orders Act 1950.	Section 11(4).
15 & 16 Geo. 6 & 1 Eliz. 2. c. 50	Children and Young Persons (Amendment) Act 1952	Children and Young Persons (Amendment) Act 1952.	The whole act.
1 & 2 Eliz. 2. c. 20	Births and Deaths Registration Act 1953	Births and Deaths Registration Act 1953.	Section 42(2) and (3).
1 & 2 Eliz. 2. c. 20	Births and Deaths Registration Act 1953	Births and Deaths Registration Act 1953.	In Schedule 1, paragraph 4.
1963 c. 37	Children and Young Persons Act 1963	Children and Young Persons Act 1963.	Section 64(2).
1963 c. 37	Children and Young Persons Act 1963	Children and Young Persons Act 1963.	In Schedule 3, paragraphs 42, 43 and 45.
1965 c. 42	Public Health (Notification of Births) Act 1965	Public Health (Notification of Births) Act 1965.	The whole act.
1965 c. 49	Registration of Births, Deaths and Marriages (Scotland) Act 1965	Registration of Births, Deaths and Marriages (Scotland) Act 1965.	Section 57(2) and (3).
1965 c. 49	Registration of Births, Deaths and Marriages (Scotland) Act 1965	Registration of Births, Deaths and Marriages (Scotland) Act 1965.	In Schedule 1, paragraphs 2 to 10.
1966 c. 42	Local Government Act 1966	Local Government Act 1966.	In Part II of Schedule 3, paragraph 22.
1966 c. 51	Local Government (Scotland) Act 1966	Local Government (Scotland) Act 1966.	In Part II of Schedule 4, paragraph 23.
1968 c. 36	Maintenance Orders Act 1968	Maintenance Orders Act 1968.	Section 1.
1968 c. 36	Maintenance Orders Act 1968	Maintenance Orders Act 1968.	Section 3(4).
1968 c. 36	Maintenance Orders Act 1968	Maintenance Orders Act 1968.	The Schedule.
1969 c. 28 (N.I.)	Age of Majority Act (Northern Ireland) 1969	Age of Majority Act (Northern Ireland) 1969.	Part II of Schedule 1, except the entry relating to the Government Stock Regulations 1965.
1969 c. 28 (N.I.)	Age of Majority Act (Northern Ireland) 1969	Age of Majority Act (Northern Ireland) 1969.	In Schedule 2— (a) paragraph 2 from the beginning to “thereunder, and”; (b) paragraph 3.
1969 c. 39	Age of Majority (Scotland) Act 1969	Age of Majority (Scotland) Act 1969.	In Part I of Schedule 1, the entries relating to the Tutors Act 1474, the Oaths of Minors Act 1681, the Court of Session Act 1825, the Trade Union Act Amendment Act 1876, the Trustee Savings Banks Act 1954, the Adoption Act 1958, the Building Societies Act 1962 and the Births, Deaths and Marriages (Scotland) Act 1965.
1969 c. 39	Age of Majority (Scotland) Act 1969	Age of Majority (Scotland) Act 1969.	Part II of Schedule 1, except the entries relating to the Government Stock Regulations 1965 and the Registration of Births, Still-births, Deaths and Marriages (Prescription of Forms) (Scotland) Regulations 1965.
1969 c. 39	Age of Majority (Scotland) Act 1969	Age of Majority (Scotland) Act 1969.	In Schedule 2, paragraph 2.
1969 c. 46	Family Law Reform Act 1969	Family Law Reform Act 1969.	In Part I of Schedule 1, the entries relating to the Tenures Abolition Act 1660, the Trade Union Act Amendment Act 1876, the Trustee Savings Banks Act 1954 and the Adoption Act 1958.
1969 c. 46	Family Law Reform Act 1969	Family Law Reform Act 1969.	Part II of Schedule 1, except the entry relating to the Government Stock Regulations 1965.
1969 c. 46	Family Law Reform Act 1969	Family Law Reform Act 1969.	In Schedule 2, in paragraph 2, the words “section 57 of the Local Government Act 1933”.
1970 c. 42	Local Authority Social Services Act 1970	Local Authority Social Services Act 1970.	In Schedule 1, the entry relating to the Nurseries and Child-Minders Regulation Act 1948.
1970 c. 42	Local Authority Social Services Act 1970	Local Authority Social Services Act 1970.	In Schedule 2, paragraph 6.
1978 c. 29	National Health Service (Scotland) Act 1978	National Health Service (Scotland) Act 1978.	In Schedule 16, paragraph 6.
1984 c. 23	Registered Homes Act 1984	Registered Homes Act 1984.	In Schedule 1, paragraph 1.
1984 c. 56	Foster Children (Scotland) Act 1984	Foster Children (Scotland) Act 1984.	In Schedule 1, paragraphs 7 and 8.

==== Part IX: Finance ====
Part IX — Finance
Citation	Short title	Description	Extent of repeal
Group 1 – General Repeals
5 Geo. 3. c. 49	Bank Notes (Scotland) Act 1765	Bank Notes (Scotland) Act 1765.	The whole act.
46 Geo. 3. c. 79	Duke of Grafton's Annuity Act 1806	An Act to confirm an agreement entered into between the Commissioners of His Majesty’s Treasury, and the Most Noble Augustus Henry, Duke of Grafton, in pursuance of [the Prisage and Butlerage Act 1803].	The whole act.
55 Geo. 3. c. 56 Pr.	Duke of Grafton's Estate Act 1815	An Act for enabling the sale of all or any part of the stocks already transferred in redemption of part of the annuity of £6,870, payable out of the Consolidated Fund, in lieu of the duties of prisage and butlerage of wines, granted by King Charles the Second to Henry first Duke of Grafton, and the heirs male of his body, and the stocks which shall be transferred in redemption of the remainder of the same annuity, and investing the money arising from any such sale in the purchase of manors, lands and hereditaments, and for other purposes.	The whole act.
2 & 3 Will. 4. c. 16	Excise Permit Act 1832	Excise Permit Act 1832.	The whole act.
10 & 11 Vict. c. 16	Commissioners Clauses Act 1847	Commissioners Clauses Act 1847.	In section 84, the words “Exchequer bills or other”.
33 & 34 Vict. c. 71	National Debt Act 1870	National Debt Act 1870.	Section 74.
39 & 40 Vict. c. 36	Customs Consolidation Act 1876	Customs Consolidation Act 1876.	In section 42, the words “save as thereby excepted”.
39 & 40 Vict. c. 67	Suez Canal (Shares) Act 1876	Suez Canal (Shares) Act 1876.	The whole act.
43 & 44 Vict. c. 20	Inland Revenue Act 1880	Inland Revenue Act 1880.	The whole act.
52 & 53 Vict. c. 53	Paymaster General Act 1889	Paymaster General Act 1889.	The whole act.
54 & 55 Vict. c. 38	Stamp Duties Management Act 1891	Stamp Duties Management Act 1891.	In section 9(7), proviso (c).
54 & 55 Vict. c. 39	Stamp Act 1891	Stamp Act 1891.	In section 122(1), in the definition of “stock”, the words “and India promissory notes”.
55 & 56 Vict. c. 39	National Debt (Stockholders Relief) Act 1892	National Debt (Stockholders Relief) Act 1892.	Section 5.
10 Edw. 7 & 1 Geo. 5. c. 8	Finance (1909-10) Act 1910	Finance (1909–10) Act 1910.	Section 33(2).
16 & 17 Geo. 5. c. 22	Finance Act 1926	Finance Act 1926.	The whole act.
19 & 20 Geo. 5. c. 29	Government Annuities Act 1929	Government Annuities Act 1929.	Section 52(4) from “and shall” to “this Act”.
1 & 2 Geo. 6. c. 13	Superannuation (Various Services) Act 1938	Superannuation (Various Services) Act 1938.	In Part I of the Schedule— (a) the column specifying the appropriate authority for the purposes of section 1; (b) the entry relating to the Assessor of Public Undertakings (Scotland) Act 1934.
2 & 3 Geo. 6. c. 117	National Loans Act 1939	National Loans Act 1939.	In Schedule 2, paragraph 5.
9 & 10 Geo. 6. c. 27	Bank of England Act 1946	Bank of England Act 1946.	In Schedule 1, paragraph 10.
9 & 10 Geo. 6. c. 59	Coal Industry Nationalisation Act 1946	Coal Industry Nationalisation Act 1946.	Section 33(8).
12, 13 & 14 Geo. 6. c. 77	Armed Forces (Housing Loans) Act 1949	Armed Forces (Housing Loans) Act 1949.	Section 1(1) and (5).
14 & 15 Geo. 6. c. 39	Common Informers Act 1951	Common Informers Act 1951.	In the Schedule, the entry relating to the Bank Notes (Scotland) Act 1765.
7 & 8 Eliz. 2. c. 1	Armed Forces (Housing Loans) Act 1958	Armed Forces (Housing Loans) Act 1958.	Section 2(2).
1965 c. 9	Armed Forces (Housing Loans) Act 1965	Armed Forces (Housing Loans) Act 1965.	Section 1(1) to (4).
1965 c. 9	Armed Forces (Housing Loans) Act 1965	Armed Forces (Housing Loans) Act 1965.	Section 1(5) (a) from “and, as so” onwards.
1965 c. 9	Armed Forces (Housing Loans) Act 1965	Armed Forces (Housing Loans) Act 1965.	In the Schedule— (a) paragraph 1 of Part I; (b) Part II.
1965 c. 32	Administration of Estates (Small Payments) Act 1965	Administration of Estates (Small Payments) Act 1965.	In Part III of Schedule 1, the entries relating to the Rules of the Supreme Court, the Regulations as to the suitors fund and fee fund accounts, the Supreme Court Fund Rules 1927, the Trustee Savings Banks Regulations 1929, the Savings Certificates Regulations 1933, the County Court Rules, the Post Office Savings Bank Regulations 1938, the Compensation to Seamen (War Damage to Effects) Scheme 1945, the Premium Savings Bonds Regulations 1956, the Teachers (Superannuation) (Scotland) Regulations 1957, the Court of Protection Rules 1960, the Police Pensions Regulations 1962 and the Firemen’s Pension Scheme Order 1964.
1965 c. 32	Administration of Estates (Small Payments) Act 1965	Administration of Estates (Small Payments) Act 1965.	In Schedule 2, the entries relating to the Trade Union Act Amendment Act 1876 and the Trustee Savings Banks Regulations 1929.
1965 c. 74	Superannuation Act 1965	Superannuation Act 1965.	In Schedule 10, paragraph 11.
1966 c. 15	Military Aircraft (Loans) Act 1966	Military Aircraft (Loans) Act 1966.	The whole act.
1966 c. 18	Finance Act 1966	Finance Act 1966.	Section 2(7) and (8).
1968 c. 13	National Loans Act 1968	National Loans Act 1968.	Section 16(1) from “Subject” to “gift tokens, and”.
1968 c. 13	National Loans Act 1968	National Loans Act 1968.	Section 16(2).
1968 c. 13	National Loans Act 1968	National Loans Act 1968.	In Schedule 1, the entries relating to— (a) section 2(2) of the Armed Forces (Housing Loans) Act 1958; (b) the Armed Forces (Housing Loans) Act 1965; (c) the Military Aircraft (Loans) Act 1966.
1971 c. 9	Rolls-Royce (Purchase) Act 1971	Rolls-Royce (Purchase) Act 1971.	The whole act.
1974 c. 39	Consumer Credit Act 1974	Consumer Credit Act 1974.	In Schedule 4, paragraphs 19 and 27.
1975 c. 43	British Leyland Act 1975	British Leyland Act 1975.	The whole act.
1978 c. 11	Shipbuilding (Redundancy Payments) Act 1978	Shipbuilding (Redundancy Payments) Act 1978.	The whole act.
1982 c. 4	Shipbuilding Act 1982	Shipbuilding Act 1982.	The whole act.
1982 c. 16	Civil Aviation Act 1982	Civil Aviation Act 1982.	In Schedule 15, paragraph 9.
1985 c. 9	Companies Consolidation (Consequential Provisions) Act 1985	Companies Consolidation (Consequential Provisions) Act 1985.	In Schedule 2, the entry relating to the Shipbuilding (Redundancy Payments) Act 1978.
1985 c. 14	Shipbuilding Act 1985	Shipbuilding Act 1985.	The whole act.
SI 1986/1035 (N.I. 9)	Companies Consolidation (Consequential Provisions) (Northern Ireland) Order 1986	Companies Consolidation (Consequential Provisions) (Northern Ireland) Order 1986.	In Part II of Schedule 1, the entry relating to the Shipbuilding (Redundancy Payments) Act 1978.
1987 c. 18	Debtors (Scotland) Act 1987	Debtors (Scotland) Act 1987.	In Schedule 6, paragraph 2.
Group 2 – Investment Grants
1966 c. 34	Industrial Development Act 1966	Industrial Development Act 1966.	The whole act.
1968 c. 59	Hovercraft Act 1968	Hovercraft Act 1968.	In the Schedule, paragraph 7.
1968 c. 73	Transport Act 1968	Transport Act 1968.	In Schedule 16, paragraph 10.
1969 c. 48	Post Office Act 1969	Post Office Act 1969.	In Schedule 4, paragraph 82.
1970 c. 2	Industrial Development (Ships) Act 1970	Industrial Development (Ships) Act 1970.	The whole act.
1971 c. 11	Atomic Energy Authority Act 1971	Atomic Energy Authority Act 1971.	Section 16.
1971 c. 51	Investment and Building Grants Act 1971	Investment and Building Grants Act 1971.	The whole act.
1972 c. 5	Local Employment Act 1972	Local Employment Act 1972.	In Schedule 3, the entry relating to the Industrial Development Act 1966.
1972 c. 9	Mineral Exploration and Investment Grants Act 1972	Mineral Exploration and Investment Grants Act 1972.	Section 2.
1982 c. 16	Civil Aviation Act 1982	Civil Aviation Act 1982.	In Schedule 15, paragraph 5.
1985 c. 9	Companies Consolidation (Consequential Provisions) Act 1985	Companies Consolidation (Consequential Provisions) Act 1985.	In Schedule 2, the entry relating to the Investment and Building Grants Act 1971.
1987 c. 3	Coal Industry Act 1987	Coal Industry Act 1987.	In Schedule 1, paragraph 14.
Group 3 – Film Financing
1975 c. 25	Northern Ireland Assembly Disqualification Act 1975	Northern Ireland Assembly Disqualification Act 1975.	In Part II of Schedule 1, the entry relating to the National Film Finance Corporation.
1981 c. 15	National Film Finance Corporation Act 1981	National Film Finance Corporation Act 1981.	The whole act.
1981 c. 16	Film Levy Finance Act 1981	Film Levy Finance Act 1981.	The whole act.
1985 c. 9	Companies Consolidation (Consequential Provisions) Act 1985	Companies Consolidation (Consequential Provisions) Act 1985.	In Schedule 2, the entries relating to the National Film Finance Corporation Act 1981 and the Film Levy Finance Act 1981.
1985 c. 21	Films Act 1985	Films Act 1985.	Section 2.
1985 c. 21	Films Act 1985	Films Act 1985.	Section 3(3), (6) and (8).
1985 c. 21	Films Act 1985	Films Act 1985.	Section 4.
1985 c. 21	Films Act 1985	Films Act 1985.	Section 5(1) from “at any time” to “section 3(2)”.
1985 c. 21	Films Act 1985	Films Act 1985.	Section 8(3)(a).
Group 4 – India Stock
25 & 26 Vict. c. 7	India Stock Transfer Act 1862	India Stock Transfer Act 1862.	The whole act.
26 & 27 Vict. c. 73	India Stock Certificate Act 1863	India Stock Certificate Act 1863.	The whole act.
48 & 49 Vict. c. 25	East India Unclaimed Stock Act 1885	East India Unclaimed Stock Act 1885.	The whole act.
6 & 7 Geo. 5. c. 37	Government of India (Amendment) Act 1916	Government of India (Amendment) Act 1916.	The whole act.
1 Edw. 8 & 1 Geo. 6. c. 14	East India Loans Act 1937	East India Loans Act 1937.	The whole act.
10 & 11 Geo. 6. c. 30	Indian Independence Act 1947	Indian Independence Act 1947.	Section 14.

==== Part X: Local Government ====
Part X — Local Government
Citation	Short title	Description	Extent of repeal
Group 1 – General Repeals
26 Hen. 8. c. 8	Rebuilding at Norwich (After the Fire) Act 1534	An Act for the re-edifying of void grounds in the City of Norwich.	The whole act.
26 Hen. 8. c. 9	Rebuilding at Lynn Bishop, Norfolk Act 1534	An Act for the re-edifying of void grounds within the town of Lynn.	The whole act.
27 Hen. 8. c. 1	Rebuilding in Various Towns Act 1535	An Act for re-edifying of divers towns in the Realm.	The whole act.
29 Chas. 2. c. 4	Southwark Fire, Property Disputes Act 1677	An Act for erecting a judicature to determine differences touching houses burnt and demolished by the late dreadful fire in Southwark.	The whole act.
1 & 2 Geo. 4. c. 89	London Wharves Act 1821	London Wharves Act 1821.	The whole act.
1 & 2 Will. 4. c. 32	Game Act 1831	Game Act 1831.	The following provisions as they apply to England and Wales—
1 & 2 Will. 4. c. 32	Game Act 1831	Game Act 1831.	Section 18 from “of every county” to “two”, from “within” to “district” and from “accordingly” to “annexed to this Act”.
1 & 2 Will. 4. c. 32	Game Act 1831	Game Act 1831.	Schedule (A).
17 & 18 Vict. c. 112	Literary and Scientific Institutions Act 1854	Literary and Scientific Institutions Act 1854.	Section 34.
17 & 18 Vict. c. 112	Literary and Scientific Institutions Act 1854	Literary and Scientific Institutions Act 1854.	Section 35 from “In” to “prosecutions”.
38 & 39 Vict. c. 55	Public Health Act 1875	Public Health Act 1875.	Sections 179, 180 and 181.
38 & 39 Vict. c. 55	Public Health Act 1875	Public Health Act 1875.	Section 228.
38 & 39 Vict. c. 55	Public Health Act 1875	Public Health Act 1875.	Section 251 from “The court” onwards.
38 & 39 Vict. c. 55	Public Health Act 1875	Public Health Act 1875.	Sections 261 and 269.
38 & 39 Vict. c. 55	Public Health Act 1875	Public Health Act 1875.	Section 295.
38 & 39 Vict. c. 55	Public Health Act 1875	Public Health Act 1875.	In section 308, the words “in manner provided by this Act”.
38 & 39 Vict. c. 55	Public Health Act 1875	Public Health Act 1875.	Section 340.
38 & 39 Vict. c. 55	Public Health Act 1875	Public Health Act 1875.	Section 341 from “and nothing” to the end of the section.
45 & 46 Vict. c. 50	Municipal Corporations Act 1882	Municipal Corporations Act 1882.	In section 7(1), the definitions of “burgess”, “Schedule”, “Part”,“writing” and “written”.
45 & 46 Vict. c. 50	Municipal Corporations Act 1882	Municipal Corporations Act 1882.	Section 7(4).
45 & 46 Vict. c. 50	Municipal Corporations Act 1882	Municipal Corporations Act 1882.	Section 45(8).
45 & 46 Vict. c. 50	Municipal Corporations Act 1882	Municipal Corporations Act 1882.	Sections 139, 219 and 248.
51 & 52 Vict. c. 41	Local Government Act 1888	Local Government Act 1888.	In Schedule 1, the words “Dogs”, “Trade carts” and “Horse dealers”.
53 & 54 Vict. c. 59	Public Health Acts Amendment Act 1890	Public Health Acts Amendment Act 1890.	The following provisions as they apply to England and Wales—
53 & 54 Vict. c. 59	Public Health Acts Amendment Act 1890	Public Health Acts Amendment Act 1890.	Sections 6, 7 and 10.
53 & 54 Vict. c. 59	Public Health Acts Amendment Act 1890	Public Health Acts Amendment Act 1890.	In section 11(3) the definitions except those of “urban authority” and “daily penalty”.
7 Edw. 7. c. 53	Public Health Acts Amendment Act 1907	Public Health Acts Amendment Act 1907.	Sections 6, 11 and 13 as they apply to England and Wales.
4 & 5 Geo. 5. c. clxxxiii	Local Government Board Provisional Order Confirmation (No.18) Act 1914	Local Government Board Provisional Order Confirmation (No.18) Act 1914.	The whole act.
6 & 7 Geo. 5. c. 12	Local Government (Emergency Provisions) Act 1916	Local Government (Emergency Provisions) Act 1916.	In section 21, the paragraph beginning “Except”.
9 & 10 Geo. 5. c. 75	Ferries (Acquisition by Local Authorities) Act 1919	Ferries (Acquisition by Local Authorities) Act 1919.	Section 1(5) as it applies to England and Wales.
9 & 10 Geo. 5. c. 75	Ferries (Acquisition by Local Authorities) Act 1919	Ferries (Acquisition by Local Authorities) Act 1919.	Section 5(4).
15 & 16 Geo. 5. c. 71	Public Health Act 1925	Public Health Act 1925.	Section 6 from “and any order” onwards.
15 & 16 Geo. 5. c. 71	Public Health Act 1925	Public Health Act 1925.	Section 7(1).
15 & 16 Geo. 5. c. 71	Public Health Act 1925	Public Health Act 1925.	Schedule 4.
19 & 20 Geo. 5. c. 17	Local Government Act 1929	Local Government Act 1929.	Section 57(2) and (3).
19 & 20 Geo. 5. c. 17	Local Government Act 1929	Local Government Act 1929.	Section 75.
19 & 20 Geo. 5. c. 17	Local Government Act 1929	Local Government Act 1929.	In section 131(1) and (2), the words “or scheme”, wherever occurring, and the proviso to subsection (2).
19 & 20 Geo. 5. c. 17	Local Government Act 1929	Local Government Act 1929.	In section 134, the definitions of “certified”, “county”, “County of London”, “district”, “drainage rate”, “estimated population”, “officer”, “prescribed”, “rating area”, “reduced rateable value”, “spending authority” and “unreduced rateable value”.
19 & 20 Geo. 5. c. 17	Local Government Act 1929	Local Government Act 1929.	Section 138(4).
26 Geo. 5 & 1 Edw. 8. c. 49	Public Health Act 1936	Public Health Act 1936.	Section 319.
12, 13 & 14 Geo. 6. c. 5	Civil Defence Act 1948	Civil Defence Act 1948.	Section 2(3).
6 & 7 Eliz. 2. c. 55	Local Government Act 1958	Local Government Act 1958.	Section 62.
6 & 7 Eliz. 2. c. 55	Local Government Act 1958	Local Government Act 1958.	In section 66(1), the definition of “Act of 1948”.
6 & 7 Eliz. 2. c. 55	Local Government Act 1958	Local Government Act 1958.	Section 66(2).
6 & 7 Eliz. 2. c. 55	Local Government Act 1958	Local Government Act 1958.	Section 67.
6 & 7 Eliz. 2. c. 55	Local Government Act 1958	Local Government Act 1958.	Schedule 8.
1963 c. 33	London Government Act 1963	London Government Act 1963.	Section 51(1), (2) and (4).
1963 c. 33	London Government Act 1963	London Government Act 1963.	Section 62(1)(e).
1963 c. 33	London Government Act 1963	London Government Act 1963.	In Schedule 17, paragraphs 15, 22 and 26.
1966 c. 51	Local Government (Scotland) Act 1966	Local Government (Scotland) Act 1966.	In Part II of Schedule 4, paragraphs 12, 14, 19, 20, 21, 27 and 28.
1968 c. 49	Social Work (Scotland) Act 1968	Social Work (Scotland) Act 1968.	In Schedule 8, paragraph 15.
1970 c. xl	Brighton Corporation Act 1970	Brighton Corporation Act 1970.	The whole Act except sections 1, 3, 4, 8, 25 to 27, 29, 30, 31, 32 and 34 and Schedule 2.
1970 c. xl	Brighton Corporation Act 1970	Brighton Corporation Act 1970.	Section 25 except the words “Schedule 2 to this Act shall have effect”.
1971 c. 23	Courts Act 1971	Courts Act 1971.	In Schedule 9, the entries relating to the Public Health Act 1875 and the Public Health Acts Amendment Act 1890.
1972 c. 70	Local Government Act 1972	Local Government Act 1972.	Section 219(2).
1972 c. 70	Local Government Act 1972	Local Government Act 1972.	Section 219(3) from “and subsection (2)” onwards.
1972 c. 70	Local Government Act 1972	Local Government Act 1972.	In Schedule 23, paragraph 2(9).
1972 c. 70	Local Government Act 1972	Local Government Act 1972.	In Schedule 29, paragraphs 33 and 38.
1973 c. 65	Local Government (Scotland) Act 1973	Local Government (Scotland) Act 1973.	In Part II of Schedule 27, paragraph 90.
1976 c. 57	Local Government (Miscellaneous Provisions) Act 1976	Local Government (Miscellaneous Provisions) Act 1976.	Section 83(2) from “and different days” onwards.
1982 c. 45	Civic Government (Scotland) Act 1982	Civic Government (Scotland) Act 1982.	Section 119(15).
1982 c. 45	Civic Government (Scotland) Act 1982	Civic Government (Scotland) Act 1982.	In Schedule 3, paragraph 1.
1985 c. 51	Local Government Act 1985	Local Government Act 1985.	In Schedule 4, paragraph 48.
1985 c. 51	Local Government Act 1985	Local Government Act 1985.	In Schedule 8, paragraph 1(2).
1985 c. 51	Local Government Act 1985	Local Government Act 1985.	In Schedule 16, paragraph 10.
Group 2 – Burgh Police (Scotland) Acts 1892 to 1911
9 & 10 Geo. 6. c. 49	Acquisition of Land (Authorisation Procedure) Act 1946	Acquisition of Land (Authorisation Procedure) Act 1946.	In Schedule 4, the entries relating to the Burgh Police (Scotland) Act 1892.
2 & 3 Eliz. 2. c. 32	Atomic Energy Authority Act 1954	Atomic Energy Authority Act 1954.	Section 5(6) from “sections one hundred and sixty-six” to “1903, or”.
1966 c. 51	Local Government (Scotland) Act 1966	Local Government (Scotland) Act 1966.	In Part II of Schedule 4, paragraphs 7, 8 and 9.
1967 c. 80	Criminal Justice Act 1967	Criminal Justice Act 1967.	In Part I of Schedule 3, the entries relating to the Burgh Police (Scotland) Act 1892.
1968 c. 54	Theatres Act 1968	Theatres Act 1968.	In Schedule 2, the entries relating to the Burgh Police (Scotland) Act 1892 and the Burgh Police (Scotland) Act 1903.
1973 c. 65	Local Government (Scotland) Act 1973	Local Government (Scotland) Act 1973.	Section 229.
1973 c. 65	Local Government (Scotland) Act 1973	Local Government (Scotland) Act 1973.	Schedule 28.
1974 c. 40	Control of Pollution Act 1974	Control of Pollution Act 1974.	In Schedule 3, paragraph 31.
1975 c. 20	District Courts (Scotland) Act 1975	District Courts (Scotland) Act 1975.	In Schedule 1, paragraphs 7 to 24.
1976 c. 66	Licensing (Scotland) Act 1976	Licensing (Scotland) Act 1976.	In Schedule 7, paragraphs 1 and 2.
1978 c. 4	Local Government (Scotland) Act 1978	Local Government (Scotland) Act 1978.	Section 5.
1982 c. 45	Civic Government (Scotland) Act 1982	Civic Government (Scotland) Act 1982.	Section 134(1) so far as it relates to the Burgh Police (Scotland) Acts 1892 to 1911.
1982 c. 45	Civic Government (Scotland) Act 1982	Civic Government (Scotland) Act 1982.	Section 134(2) to (4).
1982 c. 45	Civic Government (Scotland) Act 1982	Civic Government (Scotland) Act 1982.	Section 135.
1984 c. 58	Rent (Scotland) Act 1984	Rent (Scotland) Act 1984.	Section 25(3)(c).

==== Part XI: Parliamentary and Constitutional Provisions ====
Part XI — Parliamentary and Constitutional Provisions
Citation	Short title	Description	Extent of repeal
Group 1 – Parliamentary Costs Acts
10 & 11 Vict. c. 69	House of Commons Costs Taxation Act 1847	House of Commons Costs Taxation Act 1847.	Section 2.
10 & 11 Vict. c. 69	House of Commons Costs Taxation Act 1847	House of Commons Costs Taxation Act 1847.	Section 5 from “sworn” onwards.
10 & 11 Vict. c. 69	House of Commons Costs Taxation Act 1847	House of Commons Costs Taxation Act 1847.	In section 8, the words “or a writ of inquiry executed”.
10 & 11 Vict. c. 69	House of Commons Costs Taxation Act 1847	House of Commons Costs Taxation Act 1847.	Section 9 from “and in any action” to “that amount”.
12 & 13 Vict. c. 78	House of Lords Costs Taxation Act 1849	House of Lords Costs Taxation Act 1849.	Section 2.
12 & 13 Vict. c. 78	House of Lords Costs Taxation Act 1849	House of Lords Costs Taxation Act 1849.	In sections 3 and 4, the words from “when discharging” to “in person”.
12 & 13 Vict. c. 78	House of Lords Costs Taxation Act 1849	House of Lords Costs Taxation Act 1849.	Section 5 from “sworn” onwards.
12 & 13 Vict. c. 78	House of Lords Costs Taxation Act 1849	House of Lords Costs Taxation Act 1849.	In section 8, the words “or a writ of inquiry executed”.
12 & 13 Vict. c. 78	House of Lords Costs Taxation Act 1849	House of Lords Costs Taxation Act 1849.	Section 9 from “and in any action” to “that amount”.
28 & 29 Vict. c. 27	Parliamentary Costs Act 1865	Parliamentary Costs Act 1865.	Sections 5, 6 and 7.
30 & 31 Vict. c. 136	Parliamentary Costs Act 1867	Parliamentary Costs Act 1867.	Section 3.
26 Geo. 5 & 1 Edw. 8. c. 52	Private Legislation Procedure (Scotland) Act 1936	Private Legislation Procedure (Scotland) Act 1936.	In section 6(6) the words “five, six and seven”.
9 & 10 Geo. 6. c. 18	Statutory Orders (Special Procedure) Act 1945	Statutory Orders (Special Procedure) Act 1945.	In section 7(2), the words “or the Minister of Health” (in both places).
Group 2 – General Repeals
6 Hen. 8. c. 16	Attendance in Parliament Act 1514	Act concerning burgesses of the Parliament.	The whole act.
6 Anne. c. 11	Union with Scotland Act 1706	Union with Scotland Act 1706.	Article XXII of the Treaty of Union.
22 Geo. 3. c. 82	Civil List and Secret Service Money Act 1782	Civil List and Secret Service Money Act 1782.	The whole act.
39 & 40 Geo. 3. c. 38 (I)	Act of Union (Ireland) 1800	Act of Union (Ireland) 1800.	Section 10.
39 & 40 Geo. 3. c. 67	Union with Ireland Act 1800	Union with Ireland Act 1800.	Section 3.
21 & 22 Vict. c. 78	Parliamentary Witnesses Act 1858	Parliamentary Witnesses Act 1858.	Section 3.
30 & 31 Vict. c. 136	Parliamentary Costs Act 1867	Parliamentary Costs Act 1867.	Section 2.
31 & 32 Vict. c. 125	Parliamentary Elections Act 1868	Parliamentary Elections Act 1868.	The whole act.
34 & 35 Vict. c. 83	Parliamentary Witnesses Oaths Act 1871	Parliamentary Witnesses Oaths Act 1871.	In section 1, the paragraph beginning “Any person”.
6 & 7 Geo. 5. c. 65	Ministry of Pensions Act 1916	Ministry of Pensions Act 1916.	The whole act.
10 & 11 Geo. 5. c. 67	Government of Ireland Act 1920	Government of Ireland Act 1920.	In section 74 the definitions except that of “existing”.
22 & 23 Geo. 5. c. 11	Northern Ireland (Miscellaneous Provisions) Act 1932	Northern Ireland (Miscellaneous Provisions) Act 1932.	Section 7.
26 Geo. 5 & 1 Edw. 8. c. 15	Civil List Act 1936	Civil List Act 1936.	The whole act.
26 Geo. 5 & 1 Edw. 8. c. 52	Private Legislation Procedure (Scotland) Act 1936	Private Legislation Procedure (Scotland) Act 1936.	Section 19.
8 & 9 Geo. 6. c. 19	Ministry of Fuel and Power Act 1945	Ministry of Fuel and Power Act 1945.	The whole Act except sections 1(1), 6(1) and 8.
9 & 10 Geo. 6. c. 18	Statutory Orders (Special Procedure) Act 1945	Statutory Orders (Special Procedure) Act 1945.	Section 8(1).
9 & 10 Geo. 6. c. 18	Statutory Orders (Special Procedure) Act 1945	Statutory Orders (Special Procedure) Act 1945.	Schedule 2.
10 & 11 Geo. 6. c. 37	Northern Ireland Act 1947	Northern Ireland Act 1947.	Section 13.
1968 c. 48	International Organisations Act 1968	International Organisations Act 1968.	Section 12(7).
1972 c. 76	Northern Ireland (Financial Provisions) Act 1972	Northern Ireland (Financial Provisions) Act 1972.	The whole act.
1975 c. 66	Recess Elections Act 1975	Recess Elections Act 1975.	In section 1(2), the definition of “the relevant bankruptcy enactment” and the preceding “and”.
1975 c. 66	Recess Elections Act 1975	Recess Elections Act 1975.	Section 5(2), (4), (5) and (7).
1975 c. 66	Recess Elections Act 1975	Recess Elections Act 1975.	Schedule 2.

==== Part XII: Pharmacy ====
Part XII — Pharmacy
Citation	Short title	Description	Extent of repeal
2 & 3 Eliz. 2. c. 61	Pharmacy Act 1954	Pharmacy Act 1954.	In section 21, the words “section nineteen of this Act or”.
2 & 3 Eliz. 2. c. 61	Pharmacy Act 1954	Pharmacy Act 1954.	In section 24(1)— (a) the definition of “the Act of 1933”; (b) in the definition of “the Pharmacy Acts”, the words “the Act of 1933” and “under Part III of the Act of 1933 or”; (c) the definition of “the register” from “established” to “1852 and”.
2 & 3 Eliz. 2. c. 61	Pharmacy Act 1954	Pharmacy Act 1954.	Section 25.
2 & 3 Eliz. 2. c. 61	Pharmacy Act 1954	Pharmacy Act 1954.	Schedules 2 and 3.
4 & 5 Eliz. 2. c. 25	Therapeutic Substances Act 1956	Therapeutic Substances Act 1956.	The whole act.
1967 c. 80	Criminal Justice Act 1967	Criminal Justice Act 1967.	In Part I of Schedule 3, the entry relating to section 19(3) of the Pharmacy Act 1954.
1968 c. 67	Medicines Act 1968	Medicines Act 1968.	In section 69(3), the definition of “the appointed day”.
1968 c. 67	Medicines Act 1968	Medicines Act 1968.	Section 74(1) from “Subject” to “subsection”.
1968 c. 67	Medicines Act 1968	Medicines Act 1968.	Section 74(2) and (4).
1968 c. 67	Medicines Act 1968	Medicines Act 1968.	Section 76(4).
1968 c. 67	Medicines Act 1968	Medicines Act 1968.	In section 78, the words “On and after the appointed day”, wherever occurring.
1968 c. 67	Medicines Act 1968	Medicines Act 1968.	In Schedule 5, paragraph 13.
1975 c. 4	Biological Standards Act 1975	Biological Standards Act 1975.	Section 6(1).

==== Part XIII: Property Law ====
Part XIII — Property Law
Citation	Short title	Description	Extent of repeal
Group 1 – General Repeals
29 Geo. 3. c. 28	Forfeited Estates (Scotland) Act 1789	Forfeited Estates (Scotland) Act 1789.	The whole act.
11 Geo. 4 & 1 Will. 4. c. 64	Beerhouse Act 1830	Beerhouse Act 1830.	The whole act.
2 & 3 Vict. c. 20	Crown Land (Windsor) Act 1839	Crown Land (Windsor) Act 1839.	The whole act.
4 & 5 Vict. c. 30	Ordnance Survey Act 1841	Ordnance Survey Act 1841.	The whole Act as it applies to the Isle of Man.
4 & 5 Vict. c. 30	Ordnance Survey Act 1841	Ordnance Survey Act 1841.	Section 1 from “such application” to “such court”, and from “Provided always” onwards.
4 & 5 Vict. c. 30	Ordnance Survey Act 1841	Ordnance Survey Act 1841.	Sections 4 and 6.
4 & 5 Vict. c. 30	Ordnance Survey Act 1841	Ordnance Survey Act 1841.	Section 8 from “appointed” (where first occurring) to “ordnance” (where last occurring).
4 & 5 Vict. c. 30	Ordnance Survey Act 1841	Ordnance Survey Act 1841.	Sections 9, 10 and 11.
4 & 5 Vict. c. 30	Ordnance Survey Act 1841	Ordnance Survey Act 1841.	Section 12 from “but” onwards.
4 & 5 Vict. c. 30	Ordnance Survey Act 1841	Ordnance Survey Act 1841.	Sections 13, 15 and 16.
4 & 5 Vict. c. 30	Ordnance Survey Act 1841	Ordnance Survey Act 1841.	Section 17 from “Provided always” onwards.
4 & 5 Vict. c. 30	Ordnance Survey Act 1841	Ordnance Survey Act 1841.	The words “Berwick upon Tweed, and the Isle of Man”, wherever occurring.
5 & 6 Vict. c. 94	Defence Act 1842	Defence Act 1842.	Section 19 from “and shall also issue” onwards.
5 & 6 Vict. c. 94	Defence Act 1842	Defence Act 1842.	Sections 20 to 22.
5 & 6 Vict. c. 94	Defence Act 1842	Defence Act 1842.	In section 25, the words “by the verdict of any jury”.
8 & 9 Vict. c. 63	Geological Survey Act 1845	Geological Survey Act 1845.	In section 6, the definition of “county”, the words “for any county so interpreted as aforesaid” and from “and every word importing the masculine gender” onwards.
14 & 15 Vict. c. 42	Crown Lands Act 1851	Crown Lands Act 1851.	Section 22 from “And the Commissioners” onwards.
14 & 15 Vict. c. 42	Crown Lands Act 1851	Crown Lands Act 1851.	The Schedule.
23 & 24 Vict. c. 49	Colewort Barracks Act 1860	Colewort Barracks Act 1860.	The whole act.
23 & 24 Vict. c. 112	Defence Act 1860	Defence Act 1860.	Section 10 from “for any lands” to “aforesaid or”.
23 & 24 Vict. c. 112	Defence Act 1860	Defence Act 1860.	In section 11, the words “to be taken or” and “any such lands, or”.
23 & 24 Vict. c. 112	Defence Act 1860	Defence Act 1860.	Sections 12 and 13.
23 & 24 Vict. c. 112	Defence Act 1860	Defence Act 1860.	Sections 14 to 16 as they apply to Great Britain.
23 & 24 Vict. c. 112	Defence Act 1860	Defence Act 1860.	Sections 24 to 33.
23 & 24 Vict. c. 112	Defence Act 1860	Defence Act 1860.	In section 34, the words “From and after the service of such notices as aforesaid” and from “at any time” to “notice, and”.
23 & 24 Vict. c. 112	Defence Act 1860	Defence Act 1860.	Sections 42 to 44.
23 & 24 Vict. c. 112	Defence Act 1860	Defence Act 1860.	In section 47, the definitions of “county” and “sheriff”; and in the definition of “justices”, the words from “county” to “port or”, wherever occurring.
25 & 26 Vict. c. 16	Netley Hospital Act 1862	Netley Hospital Act 1862.	The whole act.
25 & 26 Vict. c. 36	Artillery Ranges Act 1862	Artillery Ranges Act 1862.	Section 3 from “and such penalty” onwards.
25 & 26 Vict. c. 57	Crown Land (Windsor) Act 1862	Crown Land (Windsor) Act 1862.	The whole act.
29 & 30 Vict. c. 109	Windsor Barracks Act 1867	Windsor Barracks Act 1867.	The whole act.
47 & 48 Vict. c. 54	Yorkshire Registries Act 1884	Yorkshire Registries Act 1884.	Section 49.
55 & 56 Vict. c. 43	Military Lands Act 1892	Military Lands Act 1892.	In section 13, as it applies to England and Wales, the words “to a court of quarter sessions”.
55 & 56 Vict. c. 43	Military Lands Act 1892	Military Lands Act 1892.	Section 20.
55 & 56 Vict. c. 43	Military Lands Act 1892	Military Lands Act 1892.	Section 27.
20 & 21 Geo. 5. c. 20	Land Drainage (Scotland) Act 1930	Land Drainage (Scotland) Act 1930.	In section 9, the definitions of “rating authority” and “prescribed”.
20 & 21 Geo. 5. c. 20	Land Drainage (Scotland) Act 1930	Land Drainage (Scotland) Act 1930.	Section 11(2).
4 & 5 Geo. 6. c. 40	War Damage to Land (Scotland) Act 1941	War Damage to Land (Scotland) Act 1941.	Section 4.
4 & 5 Geo. 6. c. 40	War Damage to Land (Scotland) Act 1941	War Damage to Land (Scotland) Act 1941.	In section 5, the proviso.
4 & 5 Geo. 6. c. 40	War Damage to Land (Scotland) Act 1941	War Damage to Land (Scotland) Act 1941.	In section 7(1), the words “or the Courts (Emergency Powers) (Scotland) Act 1939”.
4 & 5 Geo. 6. c. 41	Landlord and Tenant (War Damage) (Amendment) Act 1941	Landlord and Tenant (War Damage) (Amendment) Act 1941.	In section 1(10), the definition of “short tenancy” from “the Courts” to “1941”.
5 & 6 Geo. 6. c. 9	Landlord and Tenant (War Damage) Act (Northern Ireland) 1941	Landlord and Tenant (War Damage) Act (Northern Ireland) 1941.	In section 38(1), the definition of “short tenancy” from “the Courts” to “circumstances”.
8 & 9 Geo. 6. c. 43	Requisitioned Land and War Works Act 1945	Requisitioned Land and War Works Act 1945.	Section 55.
8 & 9 Geo. 6. c. 43	Requisitioned Land and War Works Act 1945	Requisitioned Land and War Works Act 1945.	In section 59(1), the definition of “drainage board”.
8 & 9 Geo. 6. c. 43	Requisitioned Land and War Works Act 1945	Requisitioned Land and War Works Act 1945.	In section 61(10), the words “and to drainage boards”.
8 & 9 Geo. 6. c. 43	Requisitioned Land and War Works Act 1945	Requisitioned Land and War Works Act 1945.	In the Schedule, in the entry relating to the Defence Act 1842, the word “eight”.
9 & 10 Geo. 6. c. 49	Acquisition of Land (Authorisation Procedure) Act 1946	Acquisition of Land (Authorisation Procedure) Act 1946.	In Schedule 4, the entries relating to the Public Parks (Scotland) Act 1878, the Local Government (Scotland) Act 1894, the Local Government (Scotland) Act 1908, the Children and Young Persons (Scotland) Act 1937, section 2(2) of the Harbours, Piers and Ferries (Scotland) Act 1937, the Physical Training and Recreation Act 1937 and the Requisitioned Land and War Works Act 1945.
10 & 11 Geo. 6. c. 46	Wellington Museum Act 1947	Wellington Museum Act 1947.	In the preamble, the third recital.
10 & 11 Geo. 6. c. 46	Wellington Museum Act 1947	Wellington Museum Act 1947.	In section 1(2), the words “by virtue of the Wellington Estate Acts”.
10 & 11 Geo. 6. c. 46	Wellington Museum Act 1947	Wellington Museum Act 1947.	Schedule 1.
6 & 7 Eliz. 2. c. 30	Land Powers (Defence) Act 1958	Land Powers (Defence) Act 1958.	In Schedule 2, in paragraph 13(a), the word “eight”.
7 & 8 Eliz. 2. c. 24	Building (Scotland) Act 1959	Building (Scotland) Act 1959.	Section 31.
7 & 8 Eliz. 2. c. 24	Building (Scotland) Act 1959	Building (Scotland) Act 1959.	Schedule 9.
7 & 8 Eliz. 2. c. 53	Town and Country Planning Act 1959	Town and Country Planning Act 1959.	Sections 46 and 52.
7 & 8 Eliz. 2. c. 53	Town and Country Planning Act 1959	Town and Country Planning Act 1959.	In section 57(1), the definitions of “acquiring authority”, “the Act of 1919”, “compulsory acquisition”, “public authority possessing compulsory purchase powers”, “the Minister”, “planning permission” and “prescribed”.
7 & 8 Eliz. 2. c. 53	Town and Country Planning Act 1959	Town and Country Planning Act 1959.	Section 57(2),(3) and (4).
7 & 8 Eliz. 2. c. 53	Town and Country Planning Act 1959	Town and Country Planning Act 1959.	Section 58.
7 & 8 Eliz. 2. c. 53	Town and Country Planning Act 1959	Town and Country Planning Act 1959.	Section 59(1) from “and the” onwards.
7 & 8 Eliz. 2. c. 53	Town and Country Planning Act 1959	Town and Country Planning Act 1959.	Schedule 7.
8 & 9 Eliz. 2. c. 62	Caravan Sites and Control of Development Act 1960	Caravan Sites and Control of Development Act 1960.	Sections 13 to 20.
8 & 9 Eliz. 2. c. 62	Caravan Sites and Control of Development Act 1960	Caravan Sites and Control of Development Act 1960.	Section 27 as it applies to England and Wales.
8 & 9 Eliz. 2. c. 62	Caravan Sites and Control of Development Act 1960	Caravan Sites and Control of Development Act 1960.	In section 29(1), the definition of “existing site”.
8 & 9 Eliz. 2. c. 62	Caravan Sites and Control of Development Act 1960	Caravan Sites and Control of Development Act 1960.	Section 30(2).
8 & 9 Eliz. 2. c. 62	Caravan Sites and Control of Development Act 1960	Caravan Sites and Control of Development Act 1960.	In section 32(1)— (a) paragraphs (f), (g) and (j); (b) in paragraph (l), the words “and section thirty-one”.
9 & 10 Eliz. 2. c. 55	Crown Estate Act 1961	Crown Estate Act 1961.	In Schedule 2, paragraph 1(1) (a) from “together with” to “Westminster”.
1963 c. 33	London Government Act 1963	London Government Act 1963.	In Schedule 17, paragraph 21(2) to (5).
1965 c. 2	Administration of Justice Act 1965	Administration of Justice Act 1965.	Section 34(2).
1967 c. 88	Leasehold Reform Act 1967	Leasehold Reform Act 1967.	Sections 34 and 35.
1967 c. 88	Leasehold Reform Act 1967	Leasehold Reform Act 1967.	In section 41(4), the words “subject to section 34”.
1967 c. 88	Leasehold Reform Act 1967	Leasehold Reform Act 1967.	In Schedule 3— (a) in paragraph 2(3), the words “or section 35 of this Act”; (b) paragraph 10(5) from “or” to “applying”.
1969 c. 59	Law of Property Act 1969	Law of Property Act 1969.	Section 17(3) and (4).
1969 c. 59	Law of Property Act 1969	Law of Property Act 1969.	Section 19(1).
1969 c. 59	Law of Property Act 1969	Law of Property Act 1969.	Section 20.
1972 c. 70	Local Government Act 1972	Local Government Act 1972.	Section 191(3).
1973 c. 65	Local Government (Scotland) Act 1973	Local Government (Scotland) Act 1973.	Section 145(3).
1981 c. 67	Acquisition of Land Act 1981	Acquisition of Land Act 1981.	Section 20(4).
1984 c. 29	Housing and Building Control Act 1984	Housing and Building Control Act 1984.	Sections 63 to 65.
1984 c. 29	Housing and Building Control Act 1984	Housing and Building Control Act 1984.	Section 66(3).
1984 c. 29	Housing and Building Control Act 1984	Housing and Building Control Act 1984.	Schedules 11 and 12.
1984 c. 55	Building Act 1984	Building Act 1984.	Section 16(13).
1984 c. 55	Building Act 1984	Building Act 1984.	In section 134(1)(c), the words “the Town and Country Planning Act 1947 and”.
1984 c. 55	Building Act 1984	Building Act 1984.	In section 134(2)(b), “16(13) and”.
1984 c. 55	Building Act 1984	Building Act 1984.	In Schedule 7, the entry relating to the Town and Country Planning Act 1947.
1992 c. 44	Museums and Galleries Act 1992	Museums and Galleries Act 1992.	In Schedule 8, paragraph 1(7).
Group 2 – Land Improvement Acts
16 & 17 Vict. c. cliv	Lands Improvement Company’s Act 1853	Lands Improvement Company’s Act 1853.	Sections 8, 13, 23, 24 and 28.
16 & 17 Vict. c. cliv	Lands Improvement Company’s Act 1853	Lands Improvement Company’s Act 1853.	Section 45 from “and where” to “determine such application”.
16 & 17 Vict. c. cliv	Lands Improvement Company’s Act 1853	Lands Improvement Company’s Act 1853.	Section 54 from the beginning to “Act; and”.
16 & 17 Vict. c. cliv	Lands Improvement Company’s Act 1853	Lands Improvement Company’s Act 1853.	Section 60 from “may be recovered” to “Act, and” and the words “the same”.
16 & 17 Vict. c. cliv	Lands Improvement Company’s Act 1853	Lands Improvement Company’s Act 1853.	Section 65.
16 & 17 Vict. c. cliv	Lands Improvement Company’s Act 1853	Lands Improvement Company’s Act 1853.	Section 71 from “as provided” to the end of the section.
16 & 17 Vict. c. cliv	Lands Improvement Company’s Act 1853	Lands Improvement Company’s Act 1853.	Sections 74 and 84.
16 & 17 Vict. c. cliv	Lands Improvement Company’s Act 1853	Lands Improvement Company’s Act 1853.	Schedules B and D.
23 & 24 Vict. c. cxciv	Land Loan and Enfranchisement Company’s Act 1860 (Mistake Rectifying) Act 1860	Land Loan and Enfranchisement Company’s Act 1860 (Mistake Rectifying) Act 1860.	The whole act.
27 & 28 Vict. c. 114	Improvement of Land Act 1864	Improvement of Land Act 1864.	In section 8, the words “copyhold, customary”, and from “and as to lands in Ireland” to “interest” (where last occurring).
27 & 28 Vict. c. 114	Improvement of Land Act 1864	Improvement of Land Act 1864.	Section 14 from “and shall be recoverable” onwards.
27 & 28 Vict. c. 114	Improvement of Land Act 1864	Improvement of Land Act 1864.	Section 25 from “having” onwards.
27 & 28 Vict. c. 114	Improvement of Land Act 1864	Improvement of Land Act 1864.	Section 26 from “the former” to “twenty-five years”.
27 & 28 Vict. c. 114	Improvement of Land Act 1864	Improvement of Land Act 1864.	Section 33.
27 & 28 Vict. c. 114	Improvement of Land Act 1864	Improvement of Land Act 1864.	Section 40 from “the amount” onwards.
27 & 28 Vict. c. 114	Improvement of Land Act 1864	Improvement of Land Act 1864.	Section 41 from “and the amount” onwards.
27 & 28 Vict. c. 114	Improvement of Land Act 1864	Improvement of Land Act 1864.	Section 50 from “at a rate” to “annum”.
27 & 28 Vict. c. 114	Improvement of Land Act 1864	Improvement of Land Act 1864.	Section 72 from “to an action” to “waste”.
27 & 28 Vict. c. 114	Improvement of Land Act 1864	Improvement of Land Act 1864.	Section 73 from “as provided” to the end of the section.
27 & 28 Vict. c. 114	Improvement of Land Act 1864	Improvement of Land Act 1864.	Section 77 from “the amount” onwards.
45 & 46 Vict. c. 38	Settled Land Act 1882	Settled Land Act 1882.	Section 30 from “but” to “of this Act”.
60 & 61 Vict. c. 44	District Councils (Water Supply Facilities) Act 1897	District Councils (Water Supply Facilities) Act 1897.	Section 3.
62 & 63 Vict. c. 46	Improvement of Land Act 1899	Improvement of Land Act 1899.	Section 1(1) from “after” to “this Act”.
62 & 63 Vict. c. 46	Improvement of Land Act 1899	Improvement of Land Act 1899.	In section 1(4) the words “either before or after the passing of this Act”.
62 & 63 Vict. c. 46	Improvement of Land Act 1899	Improvement of Land Act 1899.	Section 3.
62 & 63 Vict. c. 46	Improvement of Land Act 1899	Improvement of Land Act 1899.	Section 5.
1969 c. xxv	Lands Improvement Company’s Amendment Act 1969	Lands Improvement Company’s Amendment Act 1969.	Section 11.
Group 3 – Land Drainage Schemes
26 & 27 Vict. c. 63	Land Drainage Supplemental Act 1863	Land Drainage Supplemental Act 1863.	Section 1 from “Provided always” (where first occurring) onwards.
26 & 27 Vict. c. 63	Land Drainage Supplemental Act 1863	Land Drainage Supplemental Act 1863.	Parts I and III of the Schedule.
27 & 28 Vict. c. 14	Land Drainage Supplemental Act 1864	Land Drainage Supplemental Act 1864.	Section 2.
27 & 28 Vict. c. 14	Land Drainage Supplemental Act 1864	Land Drainage Supplemental Act 1864.	Part I of the Schedule.
29 & 30 Vict. c. 33	Land Drainage Supplemental Act 1866	Land Drainage Supplemental Act 1866.	The whole act.
29 & 30 Vict. c. 80	Land Drainage Supplemental Act 1866, No.2	Land Drainage Supplemental Act 1866, No.2.	The whole act.
31 & 32 Vict. c. clvi	Land Drainage Supplemental Act 1868 No.2	Land Drainage Supplemental Act 1868 No.2.	The whole act.
34 & 35 Vict. c. lx	Land Drainage Supplemental Act 1871	Land Drainage Supplemental Act 1871.	The whole act.
36 & 37 Vict. c. xxiv	Land Drainage Supplemental Act 1873	Land Drainage Supplemental Act 1873.	The whole act.
38 & 39 Vict. c. i	Land Drainage Supplemental Act 1875	Land Drainage Supplemental Act 1875.	The whole act.
43 & 44 Vict. c. lxxxii	Land Drainage Supplemental Act 1880	Land Drainage Supplemental Act 1880.	The whole act.
45 & 46 Vict. c. lxvii	Land Drainage Supplemental Act 1882	Land Drainage Supplemental Act 1882.	The whole act.
46 & 47 Vict. c. ii	Land Drainage Supplemental Act 1883	Land Drainage Supplemental Act 1883.	The whole act.
46 & 47 Vict. c. lxxxv	Land Drainage Supplemental (No.2) Act 1883	Land Drainage Supplemental (No.2) Act 1883.	The whole act.
47 & 48 Vict. c. xli	Land Drainage Supplemental Act 1884	Land Drainage Supplemental Act 1884.	Section 1 from “Provided always” onwards.
47 & 48 Vict. c. xli	Land Drainage Supplemental Act 1884	Land Drainage Supplemental Act 1884.	Part II of the Schedule.
55 & 56 Vict. c. ccvii	Land Drainage Supplemental Act 1892	Land Drainage Supplemental Act 1892.	The whole act.
61 & 62 Vict. c. lxxv	Land Drainage Supplemental Act 1898	Land Drainage Supplemental Act 1898.	The whole act.
1 & 2 Geo. 5. c. cxxxiv	Land Drainage Provisional Order Confirmation Act 1911	Land Drainage Provisional Order Confirmation Act 1911.	The whole act.
1 & 2 Geo. 5. c. cxxxv	Land Drainage Provisional Order Confirmation (No.2) Act 1911	Land Drainage Provisional Order Confirmation (No.2) Act 1911.	The whole act.
1 & 2 Geo. 5. c. cxxxvi	Land Drainage Provisional Order Confirmation (No.3) Act 1911	Land Drainage Provisional Order Confirmation (No.3) Act 1911.	The whole act.
2 & 3 Geo. 5. c. cxxiii	Land Drainage (Lincoln West) (South District) Provisional Order Confirmation Act 1912	Land Drainage (Lincoln West) (South District) Provisional Order Confirmation Act 1912.	The whole act.
2 & 3 Geo. 5. c. cxxiv	Land Drainage (Billingham) Provisional Order Confirmation Act 1912	Land Drainage (Billingham) Provisional Order Confirmation Act 1912.	The whole act.
2 & 3 Geo. 5. c. cxxv	Land Drainage (Pitsea) Provisional Order Confirmation Act 1912	Land Drainage (Pitsea) Provisional Order Confirmation Act 1912.	The whole act.
2 & 3 Geo. 5. c. clxviii	Land Drainage (Braithwaite Moss) Provisional Order Confirmation Act 1912	Land Drainage (Braithwaite Moss) Provisional Order Confirmation Act 1912.	The whole act.
3 & 4 Geo. 5. c. xxvi	Land Drainage (Holme St. Cuthbert) Provisional Order Confirmation Act 1913	Land Drainage (Holme St. Cuthbert) Provisional Order Confirmation Act 1913.	The whole act.
4 & 5 Geo. 5. c. lii	Land Drainage (Rippingale) Provisional Order Confirmation Act 1914	Land Drainage (Rippingale) Provisional Order Confirmation Act 1914.	The whole act.
4 & 5 Geo. 5. c. cxxiv	Land Drainage (Tillingham Valley) Provisional Order Confirmation Act 1914	Land Drainage (Tillingham Valley) Provisional Order Confirmation Act 1914.	The whole act.
5 & 6 Geo. 5. c. lxxxviii	Land Drainage (Raveningham) Provisional Order Confirmation Act 1915	Land Drainage (Raveningham) Provisional Order Confirmation Act 1915.	The whole act.
6 & 7 Geo. 5. c. xxxix	Land Drainage (Lilleshall) Provisional Order Confirmation Act 1916	Land Drainage (Lilleshall) Provisional Order Confirmation Act 1916.	The whole act.
7 & 8 Geo. 5. c. xxviii	Land Drainage (Ewerby) Provisional Order Confirmation Act 1917	Land Drainage (Ewerby) Provisional Order Confirmation Act 1917.	The whole act.
7 & 8 Geo. 5. c. xxx	Land Drainage (Wistow) Provisional Order Confirmation Act 1917	Land Drainage (Wistow) Provisional Order Confirmation Act 1917.	The whole act.
8 & 9 Geo. 5. c. xxvi	Land Drainage (Pinchbeck) Provisional Orders Confirmation Act 1918	Land Drainage (Pinchbeck) Provisional Orders Confirmation Act 1918.	The whole act.

==== Part XIV: Statutory Interpretation Provisions ====
Part XIV — Statutory Interpretation Provisions
Citation	Short title	Description	Extent of repeal
Group 1 – Clauses Acts of 1845 and 1847
8 & 9 Vict. c. 16	Companies Clauses Consolidation Act 1845	Companies Clauses Consolidation Act 1845.	In section 3, the definition of “county”; and the definition of “justice” from “county” to “or other”.
8 & 9 Vict. c. 16	Companies Clauses Consolidation Act 1845	Companies Clauses Consolidation Act 1845.	Section 5.
8 & 9 Vict. c. 16	Companies Clauses Consolidation Act 1845	Companies Clauses Consolidation Act 1845.	Section 111 from “and if he fail” onwards.
8 & 9 Vict. c. 16	Companies Clauses Consolidation Act 1845	Companies Clauses Consolidation Act 1845.	Section 142 from “and if” onwards.
8 & 9 Vict. c. 16	Companies Clauses Consolidation Act 1845	Companies Clauses Consolidation Act 1845.	Section 150.
8 & 9 Vict. c. 16	Companies Clauses Consolidation Act 1845	Companies Clauses Consolidation Act 1845.	Section 151 as it applies to England and Wales.
8 & 9 Vict. c. 16	Companies Clauses Consolidation Act 1845	Companies Clauses Consolidation Act 1845.	Section 154.
8 & 9 Vict. c. 16	Companies Clauses Consolidation Act 1845	Companies Clauses Consolidation Act 1845.	Section 155.
8 & 9 Vict. c. 17	Companies Clauses Consolidation (Scotland) Act 1845	Companies Clauses Consolidation (Scotland) Act 1845.	In section 3, the definition of “county”; and in the definition of “justice”, the words “county, city or”.
8 & 9 Vict. c. 17	Companies Clauses Consolidation (Scotland) Act 1845	Companies Clauses Consolidation (Scotland) Act 1845.	Section 5.
8 & 9 Vict. c. 17	Companies Clauses Consolidation (Scotland) Act 1845	Companies Clauses Consolidation (Scotland) Act 1845.	Section 156.
8 & 9 Vict. c. 17	Companies Clauses Consolidation (Scotland) Act 1845	Companies Clauses Consolidation (Scotland) Act 1845.	Section 161.
8 & 9 Vict. c. 18	Lands Clauses Consolidation Act 1845	Lands Clauses Consolidation Act 1845.	In section 3, the definition of “county”; and the words “county, city, borough, liberty, cinque port, or”, wherever occurring.
8 & 9 Vict. c. 18	Lands Clauses Consolidation Act 1845	Lands Clauses Consolidation Act 1845.	Section 5.
8 & 9 Vict. c. 18	Lands Clauses Consolidation Act 1845	Lands Clauses Consolidation Act 1845.	Section 138.
8 & 9 Vict. c. 18	Lands Clauses Consolidation Act 1845	Lands Clauses Consolidation Act 1845.	Section 141 as it applies to England and Wales.
8 & 9 Vict. c. 18	Lands Clauses Consolidation Act 1845	Lands Clauses Consolidation Act 1845.	Section 145 as it applies to Northern Ireland.
8 & 9 Vict. c. 19	Lands Clauses Consolidation (Scotland) Act 1845	Lands Clauses Consolidation (Scotland) Act 1845.	In section 3, the definition of “county”; and the words “county, city, liberty, or”, wherever occurring.
8 & 9 Vict. c. 19	Lands Clauses Consolidation (Scotland) Act 1845	Lands Clauses Consolidation (Scotland) Act 1845.	Section 5.
8 & 9 Vict. c. 19	Lands Clauses Consolidation (Scotland) Act 1845	Lands Clauses Consolidation (Scotland) Act 1845.	Section 138.
8 & 9 Vict. c. 20	Railway Clauses Consolidation Act 1845	Railway Clauses Consolidation Act 1845.	In section 3, the definition of “county”; and the words “county, city, borough, liberty, cinque port, or”, wherever occurring.
8 & 9 Vict. c. 20	Railway Clauses Consolidation Act 1845	Railway Clauses Consolidation Act 1845.	Section 5.
8 & 9 Vict. c. 20	Railway Clauses Consolidation Act 1845	Railway Clauses Consolidation Act 1845.	Section 140 from “and if” onwards.
8 & 9 Vict. c. 20	Railway Clauses Consolidation Act 1845	Railway Clauses Consolidation Act 1845.	Section 148.
8 & 9 Vict. c. 20	Railway Clauses Consolidation Act 1845	Railway Clauses Consolidation Act 1845.	Section 149 as it applies to England and Wales.
8 & 9 Vict. c. 20	Railway Clauses Consolidation Act 1845	Railway Clauses Consolidation Act 1845.	Section 152.
8 & 9 Vict. c. 20	Railway Clauses Consolidation Act 1845	Railway Clauses Consolidation Act 1845.	Section 153.
8 & 9 Vict. c. 33	Railways Clauses Consolidation (Scotland) Act 1845	Railways Clauses Consolidation (Scotland) Act 1845.	In section 3, the definition of “county”; and the words “county, city, or”, wherever occurring.
8 & 9 Vict. c. 33	Railways Clauses Consolidation (Scotland) Act 1845	Railways Clauses Consolidation (Scotland) Act 1845.	Section 5.
8 & 9 Vict. c. 33	Railways Clauses Consolidation (Scotland) Act 1845	Railways Clauses Consolidation (Scotland) Act 1845.	Section 149.
10 & 11 Vict. c. 14	Markets and Fairs Clauses Act 1847	Markets and Fairs Clauses Act 1847.	In section 3, the definitions of “superior courts”, “county” and “quarter sessions”.
10 & 11 Vict. c. 14	Markets and Fairs Clauses Act 1847	Markets and Fairs Clauses Act 1847.	Section 5.
10 & 11 Vict. c. 14	Markets and Fairs Clauses Act 1847	Markets and Fairs Clauses Act 1847.	Section 48.
10 & 11 Vict. c. 14	Markets and Fairs Clauses Act 1847	Markets and Fairs Clauses Act 1847.	Section 55 as it applies to England and Wales.
10 & 11 Vict. c. 14	Markets and Fairs Clauses Act 1847	Markets and Fairs Clauses Act 1847.	Section 56.
10 & 11 Vict. c. 16	Commissioners Clauses Act 1847	Commissioners Clauses Act 1847.	In section 3, the definitions of “county” and “quarter sessions”.
10 & 11 Vict. c. 16	Commissioners Clauses Act 1847	Commissioners Clauses Act 1847.	Section 5.
10 & 11 Vict. c. 16	Commissioners Clauses Act 1847	Commissioners Clauses Act 1847.	Section 105.
10 & 11 Vict. c. 16	Commissioners Clauses Act 1847	Commissioners Clauses Act 1847.	Section 106.
10 & 11 Vict. c. 27	Harbours, Docks and Piers Clauses Act 1847	Harbours, Docks and Piers Clauses Act 1847.	In section 3, the definitions of “county” and “quarter sessions”.
10 & 11 Vict. c. 27	Harbours, Docks and Piers Clauses Act 1847	Harbours, Docks and Piers Clauses Act 1847.	Section 5.
10 & 11 Vict. c. 27	Harbours, Docks and Piers Clauses Act 1847	Harbours, Docks and Piers Clauses Act 1847.	Section 24.
10 & 11 Vict. c. 27	Harbours, Docks and Piers Clauses Act 1847	Harbours, Docks and Piers Clauses Act 1847.	Section 89.
10 & 11 Vict. c. 27	Harbours, Docks and Piers Clauses Act 1847	Harbours, Docks and Piers Clauses Act 1847.	Section 94 as it applies to England and Wales.
10 & 11 Vict. c. 27	Harbours, Docks and Piers Clauses Act 1847	Harbours, Docks and Piers Clauses Act 1847.	Section 95.
10 & 11 Vict. c. 34	Towns Improvement Clauses Act 1847	Towns Improvement Clauses Act 1847.	In section 3, the definitions of “superior courts” and “county”.
10 & 11 Vict. c. 34	Towns Improvement Clauses Act 1847	Towns Improvement Clauses Act 1847.	Section 5.
10 & 11 Vict. c. 34	Towns Improvement Clauses Act 1847	Towns Improvement Clauses Act 1847.	Section 212.
10 & 11 Vict. c. 65	Cemeteries Clauses Act 1847	Cemeteries Clauses Act 1847.	In section 3, the definitions of “county” and “quarter sessions”.
10 & 11 Vict. c. 65	Cemeteries Clauses Act 1847	Cemeteries Clauses Act 1847.	Section 5.
10 & 11 Vict. c. 65	Cemeteries Clauses Act 1847	Cemeteries Clauses Act 1847.	Section 64.
10 & 11 Vict. c. 89	Town Police Clauses Act 1847	Town Police Clauses Act 1847.	In section 3, the definitions of “superior courts” and “county”; and the definition of “justice” from “county” to “other”.
10 & 11 Vict. c. 89	Town Police Clauses Act 1847	Town Police Clauses Act 1847.	Section 5.
10 & 11 Eliz. 2. c. 46	Transport Act 1962	Transport Act 1962.	In Part IV of Schedule 2, the entry relating to section 152 of the Railway Clauses Consolidation Act 1845 and section 144 of the Railways Clauses Consolidation (Scotland) Act 1845.
1973 c. 65	Local Government (Scotland) Act 1973	Local Government (Scotland) Act 1973.	In Schedule 19, paragraph 1.
Group 2 – The Standard Scale and the Statutory Maximum
31 & 32 Vict. c. cxiii	Gun Barrel Proof Act 1868	Gun Barrel Proof Act 1868.	In section 4, the definition of “statutory maximum”.
35 & 36 Vict. c. 15	Parks Regulation Act 1872	Parks Regulation Act 1872.	Section 5 from “as defined” to “1982”.
10 & 11 Geo. 5. c. 55	Emergency Powers Act 1920	Emergency Powers Act 1920.	Section 2(3) from “as defined” to “1982”.
1 Edw. 8 & 1 Geo. 6. c. 33	Diseases of Fish Act 1937	Diseases of Fish Act 1937.	Section 8(1) from “(as defined” to “1982)”.
12, 13 & 14 Geo. 6. c. 54	Wireless Telegraphy Act 1949	Wireless Telegraphy Act 1949.	Section 6(2) from “as defined” to “1982”.
12, 13 & 14 Geo. 6. c. 54	Wireless Telegraphy Act 1949	Wireless Telegraphy Act 1949.	Section 14(8) and (9).
14 Geo. 6. c. 37	Maintenance Orders Act 1950	Maintenance Orders Act 1950.	Section 18(2A) from “(as defined” onwards.
6 & 7 Eliz. 2. c. 39	Maintenance Orders Act 1958	Maintenance Orders Act 1958.	Section 3(3A) from “as defined” onwards.
7 & 8 Eliz. 2. c. 57	Street Offences Act 1959	Street Offences Act 1959.	Section 1(2) from “as defined” to “1982”.
1967 c. 8	Plant Health Act 1967	Plant Health Act 1967.	Section 3(4) from “as defined” to “1982”.
1967 c. 24	Slaughter of Poultry Act 1967	Slaughter of Poultry Act 1967.	In section 8(1), the definition of “the standard scale”.
1974 c. 47	Solicitors Act 1974	Solicitors Act 1974.	In section 87(1), the definition of “the standard scale”.
1978 c. 25	Nuclear Safeguards and Electricity (Finance) Act 1978	Nuclear Safeguards and Electricity (Finance) Act 1978.	Section 2(6).
1979 c. 2	Customs and Excise Management Act 1979	Customs and Excise Management Act 1979.	Section 171(2A).
1979 c. 34	Credit Unions Act 1979	Credit Unions Act 1979.	In section 31(1), the definition of “statutory maximum”.
1979 c. 38	Estate Agents Act 1979	Estate Agents Act 1979.	In section 33(1), the definition of “the statutory maximum”.
1979 c. 46	Ancient Monuments and Archaeological Areas Act 1979	Ancient Monuments and Archaeological Areas Act 1979.	In section 61(1), the definition of “the statutory maximum”.
1980 c. 9	Reserve Forces Act 1980	Reserve Forces Act 1980.	Section 144(2).
1980 c. 11	Protection of Trading Interests Act 1980	Protection of Trading Interests Act 1980.	Section 3(5).
1980 c. 21	Competition Act 1980	Competition Act 1980.	Section 19(7).
1980 c. 43	Magistrates' Courts Act 1980	Magistrates' Courts Act 1980.	Section 155(5).
1980 c. 43	Magistrates' Courts Act 1980	Magistrates' Courts Act 1980.	In Schedule 7, paragraphs 3, 168, 183, 185, 190, 203, 205 and 206.
1980 c. 65	Local Government, Planning and Land Act 1980	Local Government, Planning and Land Act 1980.	In section 167(14), the definition of “the statutory maximum”.
1980 c. 65	Local Government, Planning and Land Act 1980	Local Government, Planning and Land Act 1980.	Section 167(15).
1980 c. 65	Local Government, Planning and Land Act 1980	Local Government, Planning and Land Act 1980.	In Schedule 20, paragraph 16(3) from “In this subparagraph” onwards.
1981 c. 14	Public Passenger Vehicles Act 1981	Public Passenger Vehicles Act 1981.	In section 65(3), the definition of “statutory maximum”.
1981 c. 14	Public Passenger Vehicles Act 1981	Public Passenger Vehicles Act 1981.	Section 65(4).
1981 c. 17	Energy Conservation Act 1981	Energy Conservation Act 1981.	In section 27(2), the definition of “the statutory maximum”.
1981 c. 17	Energy Conservation Act 1981	Energy Conservation Act 1981.	Section 28(d).
1981 c. 22	Animal Health Act 1981	Animal Health Act 1981.	Section 76(4).
1981 c. 38	British Telecommunications Act 1981	British Telecommunications Act 1981.	In section 85(1), the definition of “statutory maximum”.
1981 c. 42	Indecent Displays (Control) Act 1981	Indecent Displays (Control) Act 1981.	Section 4(3).
1981 c. 45	Forgery and Counterfeiting Act 1981	Forgery and Counterfeiting Act 1981.	Section 6(5).
1981 c. 45	Forgery and Counterfeiting Act 1981	Forgery and Counterfeiting Act 1981.	Section 22(6).
1981 c. 53	Deep Sea Mining (Temporary Provisions) Act 1981	Deep Sea Mining (Temporary Provisions) Act 1981.	Section 14(6).
1981 c. 69	Wildlife and Countryside Act 1981	Wildlife and Countryside Act 1981.	In section 71, the definition of “statutory maximum”.
1982 c. 16	Civil Aviation Act 1982	Civil Aviation Act 1982.	In section 105(1), the definition of “the statutory maximum”.
1982 c. 23	Oil and Gas (Enterprise) Act 1982	Oil and Gas (Enterprise) Act 1982.	In section 28(1), the definition of “statutory maximum”.
1982 c. 36	Aviation Security Act 1982	Aviation Security Act 1982.	In section 38(1), the definition of “the statutory maximum”.
1982 c. 49	Transport Act 1982	Transport Act 1982.	Section 23(2).
1983 c. 2	Representation of the People Act 1983	Representation of the People Act 1983.	In section 202(1), the definitions of “standard scale” and “statutory maximum”.
1983 c. 7	Conwy Tunnel (Supplementary Powers) Act 1983	Conwy Tunnel (Supplementary Powers) Act 1983.	Section 15(2) from “(within” onwards.
1983 c. 7	Conwy Tunnel (Supplementary Powers) Act 1983	Conwy Tunnel (Supplementary Powers) Act 1983.	In Schedule 3, paragraph 10 from “(within” onwards.
1983 c. 20	Mental Health Act 1983	Mental Health Act 1983.	In section 145(1), the definition of “standard scale”.
1983 c. 20	Mental Health Act 1983	Mental Health Act 1983.	Section 145(2).
1983 c. 24	Licensing (Occasional Permissions) Act 1983	Licensing (Occasional Permissions) Act 1983.	In the Schedule, paragraph 10(a) from “(as defined” onwards.
1983 c. 30	Diseases of Fish Act 1983	Diseases of Fish Act 1983.	In sections 8(1) and 9(2), the words from “as defined” onwards.
1983 c. 35	Litter Act 1983	Litter Act 1983.	In section 10, the definition of “standard scale”.
1983 c. 47	National Heritage Act 1983	National Heritage Act 1983.	Section 36(7) from “(as defined” onwards.
1983 c. 53	Car Tax Act 1983	Car Tax Act 1983.	In Schedule 1, paragraph 8(6) and (7).
1983 c. 54	Medical Act 1983	Medical Act 1983.	Section 49(1) from “(as defined” onwards.
1983 c. 55	Value Added Tax Act 1983	Value Added Tax Act 1983.	Section 48(2) and (3).
1984 c. xi	Selby Bridge Act 1984	Selby Bridge Act 1984.	In section 12(6), the definition of “statutory maximum”.
1984 c. 12	Telecommunications Act 1984	Telecommunications Act 1984.	Section 106(2) and (3).
1984 c. 12	Telecommunications Act 1984	Telecommunications Act 1984.	In Schedule 3, paragraph 2.
1984 c. 14	Anatomy Act 1984	Anatomy Act 1984.	Section 11(6) from “(as defined” to “1982)”.
1984 c. 14	Anatomy Act 1984	Anatomy Act 1984.	In section 11(7) and (8), the words “(as so defined)”.
1984 c. 22	Public Health (Control of Diseases) Act 1984	Public Health (Control of Diseases) Act 1984.	In section 74, the definition of “standard scale”.
1984 c. 23	Registered Homes Act 1984	Registered Homes Act 1984.	In section 55, the definitions of “the standard scale” and “the statutory maximum”.
1984 c. 24	Dentists Act 1984	Dentists Act 1984.	Section 53(4).
1984 c. 28	County Courts Act 1984	County Courts Act 1984.	In section 147(1), the definitions of “standard scale” and “statutory maximum”.
1984 c. 35	Data Protection Act 1984	Data Protection Act 1984.	Section 19(2)(b) from “(as defined” onwards.
1984 c. 35	Data Protection Act 1984	Data Protection Act 1984.	Section 19(3) from “(as defined” onwards.
1984 c. 36	Mental Health (Scotland) Act 1984	Mental Health (Scotland) Act 1984.	In section 125(1), the definitions of “standard scale” and “statutory maximum”.
1984 c. 37	Child Abduction Act 1984	Child Abduction Act 1984.	In sections 4(1)(a) and 8(a), the words from “as defined” to “1982”.
1984 c. 39	Video Recordings Act 1984	Video Recordings Act 1984.	Section 15(3) from “In this subsection” onwards.
1984 c. 40	Animal Health and Welfare Act 1984	Animal Health and Welfare Act 1984.	Section 10(6) from “In this subsection” onwards.
1984 c. 43	Finance Act 1984	Finance Act 1984.	In Schedule 5, paragraph 3.
1984 c. 51	Inheritance Tax Act 1984	Inheritance Tax Act 1984.	Section 220(2) from “(within” onwards.
1984 c. 54	Roads (Scotland) Act 1984	Roads (Scotland) Act 1984.	Section 131(2)(b) from “as defined” onwards.
1984 c. 54	Roads (Scotland) Act 1984	Roads (Scotland) Act 1984.	Section 131(2)(c).
1984 c. 55	Building Act 1984	Building Act 1984.	In section 126, the definitions of “standard scale” and “statutory maximum”.
1984 c. 60	Police and Criminal Evidence Act 1984	Police and Criminal Evidence Act 1984.	Section 98(2) from “as defined” onwards.
1984 c. 60	Police and Criminal Evidence Act 1984	Police and Criminal Evidence Act 1984.	In Schedule 3, paragraph 10(b) from “(as defined” to “1982)”.
1984 c. 60	Police and Criminal Evidence Act 1984	Police and Criminal Evidence Act 1984.	In Schedule 4, paragraph 14(2) from “as defined” onwards.
SI 1984/703 (N.I. 3)	Fines and Penalties (Northern Ireland) Order 1984	Fines and Penalties (Northern Ireland) Order 1984.	In Schedule 6, paragraphs 1, 3 to 6, 11 to 17, and 19 to 29.
1985 c. 4	Milk (Cessation of Production) Act 1985	Milk (Cessation of Production) Act 1985.	Section 3(1) from “within” (where secondly occurring) to “1982”.
1985 c. 6	Companies Act 1985	Companies Act 1985.	In Schedule 24, the Note.
1985 c. 7	Business Names Act 1985	Business Names Act 1985.	In section 8(1), the definition of “statutory maximum”.
1985 c. 8	Company Securities (Insider Dealing) Act 1985	Company Securities (Insider Dealing) Act 1985.	In section 16(1), the definition of “statutory maximum”.
1985 c. 12	Mineral Workings Act 1985	Mineral Workings Act 1985.	Section 7(10) from “as defined” onwards.
1985 c. 13	Cinemas Act 1985	Cinemas Act 1985.	In section 21(1), the definition of “standard scale”.
1985 c. 26	Intoxicating Substances (Supply) Act 1985	Intoxicating Substances (Supply) Act 1985.	Section 1(3) from “(as defined” to “1982)”.
1985 c. 29	Enduring Powers of Attorney Act 1985	Enduring Powers of Attorney Act 1985.	In section 13(1), the definition of “statutory maximum”.
1985 c. 38	Prohibition of Female Circumcision Act 1985	Prohibition of Female Circumcision Act 1985.	Section 1(2)(b) from “(as defined” to “1982)”.
1985 c. 44	Sexual Offences Act 1985	Sexual Offences Act 1985.	In sections 1(2) and 2(2), the words from “(as defined” onwards.
1985 c. 48	Food and Environment Protection Act 1985	Food and Environment Protection Act 1985.	In section 24(1), the definitions of “the standard scale” and “the statutory maximum”.
1985 c. 49	Surrogacy Arrangements Act 1985	Surrogacy Arrangements Act 1985.	Section 4(1) from “In this subsection” onwards.
1985 c. 54	Finance Act 1985	Finance Act 1985.	In sections 10(4) and 89(3), the words from “(as defined” onwards.
1985 c. 56	Interception of Communications Act 1985	Interception of Communications Act 1985.	In section 10(1), the definition of “statutory maximum”.
1985 c. 61	Administration of Justice Act 1985	Administration of Justice Act 1985.	Section 10(4).
1985 c. 61	Administration of Justice Act 1985	Administration of Justice Act 1985.	In section 39(1), the definition of “the standard scale”.
1985 c. 66	Bankruptcy (Scotland) Act 1985	Bankruptcy (Scotland) Act 1985.	In section 73(1), the definitions of “standard scale” and “statutory maximum”.
1985 c. 67	Transport Act 1985	Transport Act 1985.	In section 137(1), the definition of “the standard scale”.
1985 c. 68	Housing Act 1985	Housing Act 1985.	In section 622, the definitions of “standard scale” and “statutory maximum”.
1985 c. 69	Housing Associations Act 1985	Housing Associations Act 1985.	In section 39, the definition of “standard scale”.
1985 c. 69	Housing Associations Act 1985	Housing Associations Act 1985.	Section 64(4).
1985 c. 71	Housing (Consequential Provisions) Act 1985	Housing (Consequential Provisions) Act 1985.	In Schedule 4, paragraph 14(2) from “(within” onwards.
1985 c. 72	Weights and Measures Act 1985	Weights and Measures Act 1985.	In section 94(1), the definitions of “standard scale” and “statutory maximum”.
1986 c. 45	Insolvency Act 1986	Insolvency Act 1986.	In Schedule 10, the Note.
Group 3 – Miscellaneous
38 & 39 Vict. c. 55	Public Health Act 1875	Public Health Act 1875.	In section 4, in the definition of “rackrent”, the words “and tithe commutation rentcharge (if any)”.
26 Geo. 5 & 1 Edw. 8. c. 49	Public Health Act 1936	Public Health Act 1936.	In sections 45(4) and 205, the words “or workshop”.
26 Geo. 5 & 1 Edw. 8. c. 49	Public Health Act 1936	Public Health Act 1936.	In section 287, the word “workshop”, wherever occurring.
26 Geo. 5 & 1 Edw. 8. c. 49	Public Health Act 1936	Public Health Act 1936.	In section 343(1)— (a) in the definition of “rackrent”, the words “and tithe rentcharge (if any)”; (b) the definitions of “workshop” and “school”; (c) in the definition of “workplace”, the words “or workshop”.
9 & 10 Eliz. 2. c. 34	Factories Act 1961	Factories Act 1961.	In section 176(1), the definition of “magistrates' court”.
1963 c. 41	Offices, Shops and Railway Premises Act 1963	Offices, Shops and Railway Premises Act 1963.	In section 90(1), the definitions of “magistrates' court”, “petty sessions area” and “police authority”.
1964 c. 69	Scrap Metal Dealers Act 1964	Scrap Metal Dealers Act 1964.	In section 9(2), the definition of “magistrates' court”.
1980 c. 43	Magistrates' Courts Act 1980	Magistrates' Courts Act 1980.	In Schedule 7, paragraph 37.
1980 c. 66	Highways Act 1980	Highways Act 1980.	In section 329(1), in the definition of “rackrent”, the words “and tithe rentcharge (if any)”.

==== Part XV: Transport ====
Part XV — Transport
Citation	Short title	Description	Extent of repeal
Group 1 – General Repeals
1 Geo. 4. c. lxxxiv	Lanark and Dumbarton Roads and Bridges Act 1820	An Act for making and maintaining certain roads and bridges in the counties of Lanark and Dumbarton.	The whole act.
4 Geo. 4. c. 10	Lanark and Dumbarton Roads and Bridges Act 1820 (Amendment) Act 1823	An Act to rectify a mistake in [the Act 1 Geo. 4 c.lxxxiv], in so far as relates to the application of certain Exchequer bills therein mentioned.	The whole act.
7 & 8 Vict. c. 91	South Wales Turnpike Trusts Act 1844	South Wales Turnpike Trusts Act 1844.	The whole act.
8 & 9 Vict. c. 61	South Wales Turnpike Trusts Act 1845	South Wales Turnpike Trusts Act 1845.	The whole act.
10 & 11 Vict. c. 72	South Wales Turnpike Trusts Act 1847	South Wales Turnpike Trusts Act 1847.	The whole act.
24 & 25 Vict. c. 47	Harbours and Passing Tolls, &c. Act 1861	Harbours and Passing Tolls, &c. Act 1861.	In section 2, the definition of “pilotage authority”.
24 & 25 Vict. c. 70	Locomotive Act 1861	Locomotive Act 1861.	Section 1 except as it applies to the Swinford Bridge Act 1767 and the Dunham Bridge Act 1830.
24 & 25 Vict. c. 70	Locomotive Act 1861	Locomotive Act 1861.	In section 1 as it so applies, the words from “Provided always” (where first occurring) to “or bearing” and from “Provided always” (where secondly occurring) onwards.
24 & 25 Vict. c. 70	Locomotive Act 1861	Locomotive Act 1861.	Sections 2 and 10.
30 & 31 Vict. c. 134	Metropolitan Streets Act 1867	Metropolitan Streets Act 1867.	Sections 2 and 4.
30 & 31 Vict. c. 134	Metropolitan Streets Act 1867	Metropolitan Streets Act 1867.	In sections 6, 7 and 9, the word “general”.
30 & 31 Vict. c. 134	Metropolitan Streets Act 1867	Metropolitan Streets Act 1867.	In section 22, the words “The said Secretary of State or”.
41 & 42 Vict. c. 77	Highways and Locomotives (Amendment) Act 1878	Highways and Locomotives (Amendment) Act 1878.	The whole act.
48 & 49 Vict. c. 18	Metropolitan Streets Act 1885	Metropolitan Streets Act 1885.	The whole act.
51 & 52 Vict. c. 41	Local Government Act 1888	Local Government Act 1888.	In Schedule 1, the word “Locomotives”.
61 & 62 Vict. c. 29	Locomotives Act 1898	Locomotives Act 1898.	The whole act.
9 & 10 Geo. 5. c. 50	Ministry of Transport Act 1919	Ministry of Transport Act 1919.	Section 24 from “or in Ireland” onwards.
15 & 16 Geo. 5. c. 71	Public Health Act 1925	Public Health Act 1925.	Section 10 from “or any power” onwards.
18 & 19 Geo. 5. c. 32	Petroleum (Consolidation) Act 1928	Petroleum (Consolidation) Act 1928.	In section 23, the definitions of “amenities” and “petroleum filling station”.
18 & 19 Geo. 5. c. 32	Petroleum (Consolidation) Act 1928	Petroleum (Consolidation) Act 1928.	Section 24(3), (4), (5) and (7).
18 & 19 Geo. 5. c. 32	Petroleum (Consolidation) Act 1928	Petroleum (Consolidation) Act 1928.	Section 26(3)(b).
20 & 21 Geo. 5. c. 43	Road Traffic Act 1930	Road Traffic Act 1930.	Sections 110, 113 and 117.
20 & 21 Geo. 5. c. 43	Road Traffic Act 1930	Road Traffic Act 1930.	In section 121(1), the definition of “forestry”.
20 & 21 Geo. 5. c. 43	Road Traffic Act 1930	Road Traffic Act 1930.	Section 121(1A).
23 & 24 Geo. 5. c. 14	London Passenger Transport Act 1933	London Passenger Transport Act 1933.	Sections 73 to 79.
23 & 24 Geo. 5. c. 14	London Passenger Transport Act 1933	London Passenger Transport Act 1933.	In section 107(1), the definitions of “Advisory Committee”, “chief officer of police”, “Commissioner of Police”, “revenues of the Board”, “statutory security”, “suburban passenger services” and “traffic commissioner”.
23 & 24 Geo. 5. c. 14	London Passenger Transport Act 1933	London Passenger Transport Act 1933.	Section 107(1A).
23 & 24 Geo. 5. c. 14	London Passenger Transport Act 1933	London Passenger Transport Act 1933.	Schedule 14.
15 & 16 Geo. 6 & 1 Eliz. 2. c. 39	Motor Vehicles (International Circulation) Act 1952	Motor Vehicles (International Circulation) Act 1952.	Section 4.
15 & 16 Geo. 6 & 1 Eliz. 2. c. 39	Motor Vehicles (International Circulation) Act 1952	Motor Vehicles (International Circulation) Act 1952.	Section 7 from “and shall” onwards.
1 & 2 Eliz. 2. c. 36	Post Office Act 1953	Post Office Act 1953.	Section 87(1A).
2 & 3 Eliz. 2. c. 64	Transport Charges &c. (Miscellaneous Provisions) Act 1954	Transport Charges &c. (Miscellaneous Provisions) Act 1954.	In section 13(3), the words “the Transport Act 1947”.
4 & 5 Eliz. 2. c. 6	Miscellaneous Financial Provisions Act 1955	Miscellaneous Financial Provisions Act 1955.	Schedule 1 except so far as it amends the New Forest Act 1949.
8 & 9 Eliz. 2. c. 16	Road Traffic Act 1960	Road Traffic Act 1960.	In section 248, the words “or sections 9, 14, 15 or 20(2) of the London Government Act 1963”.
8 & 9 Eliz. 2. c. 16	Road Traffic Act 1960	Road Traffic Act 1960.	In section 257(1), the definitions of “fares”, “magistrates' court”, “petty sessions area”, “tramcar” and “trolley vehicle”.
8 & 9 Eliz. 2. c. 16	Road Traffic Act 1960	Road Traffic Act 1960.	Section 264.
8 & 9 Eliz. 2. c. 16	Road Traffic Act 1960	Road Traffic Act 1960.	Section 266(a) and (c).
8 & 9 Eliz. 2. c. 16	Road Traffic Act 1960	Road Traffic Act 1960.	Sections 267 and 268.
8 & 9 Eliz. 2. c. 16	Road Traffic Act 1960	Road Traffic Act 1960.	Schedules 17 and 19.
1963 c. 33	London Government Act 1963	London Government Act 1963.	Section 9(6).
1963 c. 33	London Government Act 1963	London Government Act 1963.	In Schedule 17, paragraph 1.
1965 c. 37	Carriage of Goods by Road Act 1965	Carriage of Goods by Road Act 1965.	In section 9, paragraph (d).
1967 c. 70	Road Traffic (Amendment) Act 1967	Road Traffic (Amendment) Act 1967.	Section 10(2) and (3).
1967 c. 76	Road Traffic Regulation Act 1967	Road Traffic Regulation Act 1967.	Schedule 6 except the entry relating to Schedule 20 to the Road Traffic Act 1960.
1969 c. 27	Vehicle and Driving Licences Act 1969	Vehicle and Driving Licences Act 1969.	Section 1.
1969 c. 27	Vehicle and Driving Licences Act 1969	Vehicle and Driving Licences Act 1969.	Section 2 except subsection (3).
1969 c. 27	Vehicle and Driving Licences Act 1969	Vehicle and Driving Licences Act 1969.	Section 3.
1969 c. 27	Vehicle and Driving Licences Act 1969	Vehicle and Driving Licences Act 1969.	Sections 27 and 33.
1969 c. 27	Vehicle and Driving Licences Act 1969	Vehicle and Driving Licences Act 1969.	In section 34(1) and (2), the words “orders or” and “order or”, wherever occurring.
1969 c. 27	Vehicle and Driving Licences Act 1969	Vehicle and Driving Licences Act 1969.	Section 34(2)— (a) from the beginning to“1960”, except the words “any regulations made under this Act”; (b) from “and nothing” onwards.
1969 c. 27	Vehicle and Driving Licences Act 1969	Vehicle and Driving Licences Act 1969.	Section 34(3) and (4).
1969 c. 27	Vehicle and Driving Licences Act 1969	Vehicle and Driving Licences Act 1969.	Sections 36 and 37.
1969 c. 27	Vehicle and Driving Licences Act 1969	Vehicle and Driving Licences Act 1969.	Section 38(2).
1969 c. 27	Vehicle and Driving Licences Act 1969	Vehicle and Driving Licences Act 1969.	Schedules 1 and 3.
1969 c. 48	Post Office Act 1969	Post Office Act 1969.	In Schedule 4, paragraph 91.
1971 c. 23	Courts Act 1971	Courts Act 1971.	In Schedule 9, the entry relating to the Highways and Locomotives (Amendment) Act 1878.
1972 c. 11	Superannuation Act 1972	Superannuation Act 1972.	In Schedule 6, paragraph 72.
1972 c. 70	Local Government Act 1972	Local Government Act 1972.	Section 186(1) and (4).
1973 c. 65	Local Government (Scotland) Act 1973	Local Government (Scotland) Act 1973.	In Schedule 24, paragraph 46.
1980 c. 43	Magistrates' Courts Act 1980	Magistrates' Courts Act 1980.	In Schedule 7, paragraph 35.
1983 c. 43	Road Traffic (Driving Licences) Act 1983	Road Traffic (Driving Licences) Act 1983.	The whole act.
1984 c. 27	Road Traffic Regulation Act 1984	Road Traffic Regulation Act 1984.	Section 138(7) and (8).
1984 c. 27	Road Traffic Regulation Act 1984	Road Traffic Regulation Act 1984.	In Schedule 10, paragraph 8.
1985 c. 51	Local Government Act 1985	Local Government Act 1985.	In Schedule 4, paragraph 45.
1987 c. 21	Pilotage Act 1987	Pilotage Act 1987.	Section 27.
1987 c. 21	Pilotage Act 1987	Pilotage Act 1987.	In section 33(2), the words “except section 27”.
1988 c. 52	Road Traffic Act 1988	Road Traffic Act 1988.	Section 82(3).
Group 2 – London Cab Law
1 & 2 Will. 4. c. 22	London Hackney Carriage Act 1831	London Hackney Carriage Act 1831.	Sections 27 and 28.
6 & 7 Vict. c. 86	London Hackney Carriages Act 1843	London Hackney Carriages Act 1843.	Section 10 from “Provided always” onwards.
6 & 7 Vict. c. 86	London Hackney Carriages Act 1843	London Hackney Carriages Act 1843.	Sections 22 and 23.
6 & 7 Vict. c. 86	London Hackney Carriages Act 1843	London Hackney Carriages Act 1843.	Section 28 from “and in every case” onwards.
6 & 7 Vict. c. 86	London Hackney Carriages Act 1843	London Hackney Carriages Act 1843.	Section 35.
16 & 17 Vict. c. 33	London Hackney Carriage Act 1853	London Hackney Carriage Act 1853.	Sections 12 and 13.
32 & 33 Vict. c. 115	Metropolitan Public Carriage Act 1869	Metropolitan Public Carriage Act 1869.	Section 8 from “This clause” to “1843”.
Group 3 – Road Mileage Charges
4 & 5 Geo. 5. c. lxxxviii	Newport Corporation Act 1914	Newport Corporation Act 1914.	Section 36.
4 & 5 Geo. 5. c. lxxxviii	Newport Corporation Act 1914	Newport Corporation Act 1914.	Section 37(2) and (3).
7 & 8 Geo. 5. c. xxxvii	Bedwas and Machen Urban District Council Act 1917	Bedwas and Machen Urban District Council Act 1917.	Section 16.
7 & 8 Geo. 5. c. xl	Ebbw Vale Urban District Council Act 1917	Ebbw Vale Urban District Council Act 1917.	Section 42.
7 & 8 Geo. 5. c. xlii	Ashton-under-Lyne Corporation Act 1917	Ashton-under-Lyne Corporation Act 1917.	Section 29(2).
7 & 8 Geo. 5. c. xlix	Caerphilly Urban District Council Act 1917	Caerphilly Urban District Council Act 1917.	Section 16.
8 & 9 Geo. 5. c. xx	Morecombe Corporation Act 1918	Morecombe Corporation Act 1918.	Section 7(3).
9 & 10 Geo. 5. c. lxvii	Stretford Urban District Council Act 1919	Stretford Urban District Council Act 1919.	Section 28.
10 & 11 Geo. 5. c. xxi	Risca Urban District Council Act 1920	Risca Urban District Council Act 1920.	Section 18(1), (2) and (8).
10 & 11 Geo. 5. c. lxxvii	Leigh Corporation Act 1920	Leigh Corporation Act 1920.	Section 6(1), (2) and (7).
10 & 11 Geo. 5. c. xcvii	Manchester Corporation Act 1920	Manchester Corporation Act 1920.	Section 45(2), (3) and (8).
10 & 11 Geo. 5. c. cxlii	Cardiff Corporation Act 1920	Cardiff Corporation Act 1920.	Section 66(1), (2) and (7).
10 & 11 Geo. 5. c. cxlii	Cardiff Corporation Act 1920	Cardiff Corporation Act 1920.	Section 69(2).
10 & 11 Geo. 5. c. clxxi	Lanarkshire Tramways Order Confirmation Act 1920	Lanarkshire Tramways Order Confirmation Act 1920.	In the Schedule, Article 15(6) of the Lanarkshire Tramways Order 1920.
10 & 11 Geo. 5. c. 72	Roads Act 1920	Roads Act 1920.	Section 10.
1991 c. 22	New Roads and Street Works Act 1991	New Roads and Street Works Act 1991.	In Schedule 8, paragraph 98.
Group 4 – Selby Bridge
31 Geo. 3. c. 60	Selby Bridge Act 1791	Selby Bridge Act 1791.	Sections 17, 19 and 20.
31 Geo. 3. c. 60	Selby Bridge Act 1791	Selby Bridge Act 1791.	Sections 21, 22, 23 and 26.
31 Geo. 3. c. 60	Selby Bridge Act 1791	Selby Bridge Act 1791.	Sections 32 to 38.
31 Geo. 3. c. 60	Selby Bridge Act 1791	Selby Bridge Act 1791.	Sections 41, 42, 48 and 51.
31 Geo. 3. c. 60	Selby Bridge Act 1791	Selby Bridge Act 1791.	Section 52 from “and it shall be lawful” onwards.
31 Geo. 3. c. 60	Selby Bridge Act 1791	Selby Bridge Act 1791.	Section 59.
31 Geo. 3. c. 60	Selby Bridge Act 1791	Selby Bridge Act 1791.	In section 60, the words “by the person or persons appointed to collect the said tolls or” and the word “other”.
31 Geo. 3. c. 60	Selby Bridge Act 1791	Selby Bridge Act 1791.	Sections 61 and 71.
43 Geo. 3. c. xlviii	Selby Bridge Act 1803	Selby Bridge Act 1803.	The whole act.
1984 c. xi	Selby Bridge Act 1984	Selby Bridge Act 1984.	In section 2, the definition of “the Act of 1803”.
1984 c. xi	Selby Bridge Act 1984	Selby Bridge Act 1984.	Sections 4 to 8.
1984 c. xi	Selby Bridge Act 1984	Selby Bridge Act 1984.	Section 14(1)(a) and (2).
1984 c. xi	Selby Bridge Act 1984	Selby Bridge Act 1984.	In section 14(1)(b), the words “and the Act of 1803”.
1984 c. xi	Selby Bridge Act 1984	Selby Bridge Act 1984.	Section 15.
1984 c. xi	Selby Bridge Act 1984	Selby Bridge Act 1984.	In Schedule 1— (a) Part I; (b) in Part II, the entries relating to section 34 of the Act of 1791 and the Act of 1803.
1984 c. xi	Selby Bridge Act 1984	Selby Bridge Act 1984.	Schedule 2.
SI 1986/1401	Selby Bridge Tolls (Revision) Order 1986	Selby Bridge Tolls (Revision) Order 1986.	The whole Order.
Group 5 – Port of London Improvement
39 & 40 Geo. 3. c. xlvii	London Dock Act 1800	An Act for making wet docks, basins, cuts and other works, for the greater accommodation and security of shipping, commerce and revenue, within the port of London.	Section 110.
46 Geo. 3. c. 118	Port of London (Legal Quays) Act 1806	An Act to extend the time for purchasing the legal quays and warehouses in the port of London, and for authorising the Lords Commissioners of His Majesty’s Treasury to purchase Somers and Lyons Quays in the said port.	The whole act.
47 Geo. 3 Sess. 2. c. 60	Port of London (Legal Quays) Act 1806 Continuance Act 1807	An Act to give further time for purchasing the legal quays and warehouses in the port of London.	The whole act.
50 Geo. 3. c. 22	Port of London (Purchase of Quays) Act 1810	An Act for authorising the Lords Commissioners of the Treasury to purchase certain quays within the port of London.	The whole act.
52 Geo. 3. c. 49	Port of London (Legal Quays) Act 1806 Continuance Act 1812	An Act to continue the period for purchasing the legal quays in the port of London, and to enable the Lords of the Treasury to purchase buildings in Thames Street for the purpose of erecting a new custom house.	The whole act.
54 Geo. 3. c. 45	Port of London (Legal Quays) Act 1806 Continuance Act 1814	An Act to continue the period for purchasing the legal quays in the port of London.	The whole act.
2 & 3 Will. 4. c. 66	Tower of London to London Bridge (Crown Premises) Act 1832	An Act to provide for the conveyance of premises, the property of the Crown, situate between the Tower of London and London Bridge.	The whole act.
3 & 4 Will. 4. c. 8	Tower of London to London Bridge (Crown Premises) Amendment Act 1833	An Act to amend an Act for the conveyance of certain premises situate between London Bridge and the Tower of London.	The whole act.
Group 6 – Entry of Cargo Imported by Sea
9 & 10 Vict. c. cccxcix	Port of London (Legal Quays) Act 1846	An Act for the regulation of the legal quays within the port of London.	The whole act.
10 & 11 Vict. c. cc	Port of London (Legal Quays) Act 1846 Continuance Act 1847	An Act for making perpetual [the Act 9 & 10 Vict. c.cccxcix].	The whole act.
11 & 12 Vict. c. xviii	Port of London (Public Sufferance Wharves) Act 1848	An Act for the regulation of certain public sufferance wharves in the port of London.	The whole act.
20 & 21 Vict. c. ix	Meriton’s and Hagen’s Sufferance Wharves Act 1857	Meriton’s and Hagen’s Sufferance Wharves Act 1857.	The whole act.
21 & 22 Vict. c. xli	Sufferance Wharves (Port of London) Act 1858	Sufferance Wharves (Port of London) Act 1858.	The whole act.
57 & 58 Vict. c. 60	Merchant Shipping Act 1894	Merchant Shipping Act 1894.	Sections 492 to 501.
14 Geo. 6. c. 27	Arbitration Act 1950	Arbitration Act 1950.	Section 29(1).
14 Geo. 6. c. 27	Arbitration Act 1950	Arbitration Act 1950.	Section 29(2) from “For” to “this section”.
1979 c. 2	Customs and Excise Management Act 1979	Customs and Excise Management Act 1979.	In Schedule 4, in the Table in paragraph 12, the entry relating to the Merchant Shipping Act 1894.

==== Part XVI: Miscellaneous ====
Part XVI — Miscellaneous
Citation	Short title	Description	Extent of repeal
Group 1 – General Repeals
1 & 2 Geo. 4. c. 76	Cinque Ports Act 1821	Cinque Ports Act 1821.	Section 1 from “who” to “Chancery”.
1 & 2 Geo. 4. c. 76	Cinque Ports Act 1821	Cinque Ports Act 1821.	Section 3 from “before a magistrate” to “(videlicet)”.
1 & 2 Geo. 4. c. 76	Cinque Ports Act 1821	Cinque Ports Act 1821.	Section 4 from “according” to “annexed”.
1 & 2 Geo. 4. c. 76	Cinque Ports Act 1821	Cinque Ports Act 1821.	Section 15 from “and the judge” to “being” and the words “any magistrate or magistrates or”.
1 & 2 Geo. 4. c. 76	Cinque Ports Act 1821	Cinque Ports Act 1821.	The Schedule.
9 Geo. 4. c. 37	Cinque Ports Act 1828	Cinque Ports Act 1828.	The whole act.
33 & 34 Vict. c. 67	Reserve Forces Act 1870	Reserve Forces Act 1870.	The whole act.
57 & 58 Vict. c. 56	Statute Law Revision Act 1894	Statute Law Revision Act 1894.	The whole act.
10 & 11 Geo. 5. c. 41	Census Act 1920	Census Act 1920.	Section 3(1)(b) from “superintendent” to “poor rate, and” and the word “other”.
10 & 11 Geo. 5. c. 41	Census Act 1920	Census Act 1920.	Section 7 from “and in the case” to “1908”.
10 & 11 Geo. 5. c. 41	Census Act 1920	Census Act 1920.	In section 9— (a) paragraph (1) from the beginning to “Health and”; (b) paragraph (3).
16 & 17 Geo. 5. c. 53	Merchandise Marks Act 1926	Merchandise Marks Act 1926.	The whole Act as it applies to the Isle of Man.
17 & 18 Geo. 5. c. 42	Statute Law Revision Act 1927	Statute Law Revision Act 1927.	The whole act.
21 & 22 Geo. 5. c. 9	Colonial Naval Defence Act 1931	Colonial Naval Defence Act 1931.	Section 4(2).
24 & 25 Geo. 5. c. 20	Water Supplies (Exceptional Shortage Orders) Act 1934	Water Supplies (Exceptional Shortage Orders) Act 1934.	The whole Act as it applies to Scotland.
26 Geo. 5 & 1 Edw. 8. c. 22	Hours of Employment (Conventions) Act 1936	Hours of Employment (Conventions) Act 1936.	Section 5(1)(a).
2 & 3 Geo. 6. c. 31	Civil Defence Act 1939	Civil Defence Act 1939.	Section 36(1).
2 & 3 Geo. 6. c. 31	Civil Defence Act 1939	Civil Defence Act 1939.	Section 36(2) from “Subject” to “railway undertakings” and from “in addition” to “subsection”.
2 & 3 Geo. 6. c. 31	Civil Defence Act 1939	Civil Defence Act 1939.	Section 39(1) from “whether” to “Act”.
2 & 3 Geo. 6. c. 31	Civil Defence Act 1939	Civil Defence Act 1939.	Section 39(3) from “and, in” onwards.
2 & 3 Geo. 6. c. 31	Civil Defence Act 1939	Civil Defence Act 1939.	Section 77 from “or in reply” to “members of the civil population”.
2 & 3 Geo. 6. c. 31	Civil Defence Act 1939	Civil Defence Act 1939.	In section 79(1), the words “Any factory inspector or mines inspector and”; and in paragraphs (a) and (c), the word “inspector”.
2 & 3 Geo. 6. c. 31	Civil Defence Act 1939	Civil Defence Act 1939.	Section 79(2) from “or, as the case may be” onwards.
2 & 3 Geo. 6. c. 31	Civil Defence Act 1939	Civil Defence Act 1939.	In section 79(3), the words “any inspector or”.
2 & 3 Geo. 6. c. 31	Civil Defence Act 1939	Civil Defence Act 1939.	In section 90(1), the definitions of “Factory inspector” and “Mines inspector”.
11 & 12 Geo. 6. c. 62	Statute Law Revision Act 1948	Statute Law Revision Act 1948.	Section 1.
11 & 12 Geo. 6. c. 62	Statute Law Revision Act 1948	Statute Law Revision Act 1948.	Section 3(1)(c) to (f).
11 & 12 Geo. 6. c. 62	Statute Law Revision Act 1948	Statute Law Revision Act 1948.	Section 4.
SI 1949/2149	Civil Defence (Sewerage) Regulations 1949	Civil Defence (Sewerage) Regulations 1949.	The whole Regulations.
SI 1949/2150	Civil Defence (Water Supplies) Regulations 1949	Civil Defence (Water Supplies) Regulations 1949.	The whole Regulations.
14 Geo. 6. c. 6	Statute Law Revision Act 1950	Statute Law Revision Act 1950.	Section 3(1) from “the Union” to “Ceylon” and the word “Burma”.
14 Geo. 6. c. 6	Statute Law Revision Act 1950	Statute Law Revision Act 1950.	Section 5(3).
5 & 6 Eliz. 2. c. 16	Nurses Agencies Act 1957	Nurses Agencies Act 1957.	In section 2(3)(d), the words “or Part II of the Nurses Act 1943”.
5 & 6 Eliz. 2. c. 16	Nurses Agencies Act 1957	Nurses Agencies Act 1957.	Section 9(2),(4) and (5).
1964 c. 60	Emergency Laws (Re-enactments and Repeals) Act 1964	Emergency Laws (Re-enactments and Repeals) Act 1964.	In section 14(1), the words “or the Minister of Transport”.
1964 c. 60	Emergency Laws (Re-enactments and Repeals) Act 1964	Emergency Laws (Re-enactments and Repeals) Act 1964.	Section 20(4).
1964 c. 60	Emergency Laws (Re-enactments and Repeals) Act 1964	Emergency Laws (Re-enactments and Repeals) Act 1964.	Section 22(2) to (5).
1964 c. 86	Malta Independence Act 1964	Malta Independence Act 1964.	In Schedule 2, paragraph 13.
1971 c. 77	Immigration Act 1971	Immigration Act 1971.	Section 34(6).
1974 c. 37	Health and Safety at Work etc. Act 1974	Health and Safety at Work etc. Act 1974.	Section 78(3).
1974 c. 37	Health and Safety at Work etc. Act 1974	Health and Safety at Work etc. Act 1974.	Section 83.
1974 c. 37	Health and Safety at Work etc. Act 1974	Health and Safety at Work etc. Act 1974.	In Schedule 8, paragraph 3.
1974 c. 37	Health and Safety at Work etc. Act 1974	Health and Safety at Work etc. Act 1974.	Schedules 9 and 10.
1988 c. 48	Copyright, Designs and Patents Act 1988	Copyright, Designs and Patents Act 1988.	In Schedule 8, the entry relating to the Malta Independence Act 1964.
Group 2 – Ireland
58 Geo. 3. c. 35	Royal Canal Act 1818	Royal Canal Act 1818.	The whole act.
11 Geo. 4 & 1 Will. 4. c. 22	Richmond Lunatic Asylum Act 1830	Richmond Lunatic Asylum Act 1830.	The whole act.
1 Will. 4. c. 13	Richmond Lunatic Asylum Act 1831	Richmond Lunatic Asylum Act 1831.	The whole act.
7 Will. 4 & 1 Vict. c. 25	Dublin Police Act 1837	Dublin Police Act 1837.	The whole act.
1 & 2 Vict. c. 51	Grand Jury Cess (Dublin) Act 1838	Grand Jury Cess (Dublin) Act 1838.	The whole act.
3 & 4 Vict. c. 103	Dublin Justices Act 1840	Dublin Justices Act 1840.	The whole act.
12 & 13 Vict. c. 85	Dublin Corporation Act 1849	Dublin Corporation Act 1849.	The whole act.
18 & 19 Vict. c. 69	Dublin and Other Roads Turnpikes Abolition Act 1855	Dublin and Other Roads Turnpikes Abolition Act 1855.	The whole act.
19 & 20 Vict. c. 68	Dublin Revising Barristers Act 1857	Dublin Revising Barristers Act 1857.	The whole act.
23 & 24 Vict. c. 56	Dublin Revising Barristers Act 1861	Dublin Revising Barristers Act 1861.	The whole act.
27 & 28 Vict. c. 28	Common Law Procedure Amendment Act (Ireland) 1864	Common Law Procedure Amendment Act (Ireland) 1864.	The whole act.
28 & 29 Vict. c. 2	Sale of Game (Dublin) Act 1865	Sale of Game (Dublin) Act 1865.	The whole act.
31 & 32 Vict. c. 60	Curragh of Kildare Act 1868	Curragh of Kildare Act 1868.	The whole act.
36 & 37 Vict. c. 65	County and City of Dublin Grand Juries Act 1873	County and City of Dublin Grand Juries Act 1873.	The whole act.
38 & 39 Vict. c. 20	Dublin Justices Act 1875	Dublin Justices Act 1875.	The whole act.
41 & 42 Vict. c. 75	Arranmore Polling District Act 1878	Arranmore Polling District Act 1878.	The whole act.
47 & 48 Vict. c. 35	County of Dublin Jurors and Voters Revision Act 1884	County of Dublin Jurors and Voters Revision Act 1884.	The whole act.
53 & 54 Vict. c. 12	River Suck Drainage (Provision of Funds) Act 1890	River Suck Drainage (Provision of Funds) Act 1890.	The whole act.
2 Edw. 7. c. 3	Agriculture and Technical Instruction (Ireland) Act 1902	Agriculture and Technical Instruction (Ireland) Act 1902.	The whole act.
9 Edw. 7. c. 36	Local Registration of Title (Ireland) Act 1909	Local Registration of Title (Ireland) Act 1909.	The whole act.
10 Edw. 7 & 1 Geo. 5. c. 33	Hotels and Restaurants (Dublin) Act 1910	Hotels and Restaurants (Dublin) Act 1910.	The whole act.

== Subsequent developments ==
In section 3(3) of the act, the words "the Isle of Man," were repealed by section 1(1) of, and group 2 of part X of schedule 1 to, the Statute Law (Repeals) Act 1998, which came into force on 19 November 1998.

== See also ==
- Statute Law (Repeals) Act
