= Servants' Characters Act 1792 =

Act of the Parliament of Great Britain

Servants' Characters Act 1792 (Note: The citation of this act by this short title was authorised by section 1 of, and the first schedule to, the Short Titles Act 1896. Due to the repeal of those provisions it is now authorised by section 19(2) of the Interpretation Act 1978.)
- Act of Parliament
- Parliament of Great Britain
- Long title: An Act for preventing the counterfeiting of Certificates of the Characters of Servants.
- Citation: 32 Geo. 3. c. 56
- Territorial extent: Great Britain

Dates
- Royal assent: 15 June 1792
- Commencement: 1 July 1792 (Note: Section 1.)
- Repealed: Scotland: 5 November 1993; England and Wales: 21 July 2008
Other legislation
Amended by	Statute Law Revision Act 1871; Summary Jurisdiction Act 1884; Statute Law Revision Act 1888; Criminal Justice Act 1948; Justices of the Peace Act 1949; Courts Act 1971; Bail Act 1976; Forgery and Counterfeiting Act 1981; Statute Law (Repeals) Act 1993
Repealed by	Scotland: Statute Law (Repeals) Act 1993; England and Wales: Statute Law (Repeals) Act 2008

Status: Repealed

Text of statute as originally enacted

Revised text of statute as amended

The Servants' Characters Act 1792 (32 Geo. 3. c. 56) was an act of the Parliament of Great Britain. It came about following a petition to Parliament by London and Westminster residents, concerned over a perceived rise in the use of false references by servants to gain employment. The use of false references to gain entry to a house had been linked to a number of burglaries across the country. The act criminalised the creation of false references by employers or servants and the misrepresentation by servants of their employment history. Only a single successful prosecution was made under the act, in 1910, and it was repealed in 2008.

== Background ==
The act arose from a petition to the Parliament of Great Britain from a number of householders in the cities of London and Westminster. The petitioners were concerned about the use of false references by servants to gain employment; one of the petitioners claimed to have been burgled after a servant, employed on the basis of a false reference, passed information on his house to a gang of criminals. The provision of oral or written references (referred to as characters) from previous employers was the primary means of vetting potential servants at the time. In addition to the petitioner's case a number of burglaries in the country were thought to be linked to criminals who entered employment as servants under false pretences. The petition was referred to a committee of the House of Commons who proposed the act.

== Provisions ==
The preamble of the act noted that the offences it created were "of great magnitude and continually increasing, and no sufficient remedy has hitherto been applied". The act criminalised the creation of false references "given personally or in writing by evil disposed persons being or pretending to be the master, mistress, retainer or superintendent of such servants, or by persons who have actually retained such servants in their respective service, contrary to truth and justice and to the peace and security of his Majesty's subjects". It also created offences of impersonating an employer or related person to provide a false reference for a servant, for a servant to misrepresent the nature or duration of employment, for a servant to amend or alter any written reference or for a servant to falsely deny any previous period of employment as a servant.

Sections 1 through 5 of the act laid out the offences created. Section 6 outlined the punishment, which was originally a fine of £20 (half to be paid to any informer and the remainder allocated for poor relief). If the fine was not paid, imprisonment with hard labour was implemented. Section 7 of the act stated that an informer was to be classed as a competent witness to prove the offence Section 8 of the act allowed for a form of King's evidence, providing a legal indemnity against prosecution for servants using false references who informed against others. A 1956 paper by barrister John Nevin considered that the act allowed for broader prosecution of offences than that under the Forgery Act 1913 (3 & 4 Geo. 5. c. 27), then in force. Under the Forgery Act it was only an offence to produce a false instrument, a document that purported to be something it was not, rather than a false statement, a document containing lies. Section 9 of the act laid out the wording of the conviction to be used by justices of the peace an section 10 allowed for an appeal to the general or quarter sessions.

Parts of the act relating to providing character references in writing were repealed by the Forgery and Counterfeiting Act 1981, leaving only the offences of making false references orally. Only one successful prosecution came through the act, R v Costello and Bishop (1910) against an employer giving a false reference.

== Subsequent developments ==
Section 7 of the act was repealed by section 1 of, and the schedule to, the Statute Law Revision Act 1871 (34 & 35 Vict. c. 116), which came into force on 21 August 1871.

The act was recommended for repeal by the eighteenth report on statute law repeals published by the Law Commission and the Scottish Law Commission in January 2008. The law commissions contended that the law was obsolete, superseded by more recent laws. The law commissions thought that a criminal offence of providing misleading references was out of step with current practice, where such matters were prosecuted under civil law (for example as a tort of deceit). Where a criminal prosecution is desired they noted that the Fraud Act 2006 allows for the prosecution of the provider or user of false references to gain employment as fraud by false representation, where the intent is to make a financial gain.

Section 7 of the act was repealed by section 1 of, and the schedule to, the Statute Law Revision Act 1871 (34 & 35 Vict. c. 116), which came into force on 21 August 1871.

The punishments were amended by the Summary Jurisdiction Act 1884 (47 & 48 Vict. c. 43), the Criminal Justice Act 1948 (11 & 12 Geo. 6. c. 58), the Justices of the Peace Act 1949 (12, 13 & 14 Geo. 6. c. 101), the Courts Act 1971, and the Bail Act 1976, to reflect changes in the judicial system and prison legislation.

The whole act was repealed for Scotland and section 6 of the act was repealed for England and Wales by section 1(1) of, and group 1 of part I of schedule 1 to, the Statute Law (Repeals) Act 1993, which came into force on 5 November 1993.

The whole act for England and Wales was repealed by section 1(1) of, and part 3 of schedule 1 to, the Statute Law (Repeals) Act 2008, which came into force on 21 July 2008.
