= Forgery and Counterfeiting Act 1981 =

Act of the Parliament of the United Kingdom

Forgery and Counterfeiting Act 1981 (Note: Section 34.)
- Act of Parliament
- Parliament of the United Kingdom
- Long title: An Act to make fresh provision for England and Wales and Northern Ireland with respect to forgery and kindred offences; to make fresh provision for Great Britain and Northern Ireland with respect to the counterfeiting of notes and coins and kindred offences; to amend the penalties for offences under section 63 of the Post Office Act 1953; and for connected purposes.
- Citation: 1981 c. 45
- Territorial extent: (Note: England and Wales (whole act))

Dates
- Royal assent: 27 July 1981
- Commencement: 27 October 1981 (Note: Section 33.)
Other legislation
Amends	London Hackney Carriages Act 1843; Road Traffic Act 1960; Road Traffic Act 1972; Public Passenger Vehicles Act 1981; See § Provisions
Repeals/revokes	See § Provisions
Amended by	Mental Health Act 1983; Mental Health (Northern Ireland) Order 1986; Road Traffic (Consequential Provisions) Act 1988; Statute Law (Repeals) Act 1993; Goods Vehicles (Licensing of Operators) Act 1995; Criminal Procedure (Consequential Provisions) (Scotland) Act 1995; Postal Services Act 2000; Crime (International Co-operation) Act 2003; Criminal Justice Act 2003; Asylum and Immigration (Treatment of Claimants, etc.) Act 2004; Civil Partnership Act 2004; Identity Cards Act 2006; Postal Services Act 2011; Marriage (Same Sex Couples) Act 2013 (Consequential and Contrary Provisions and Scotland) and Marriage and Civil Partnership (Scotland) Act 2014 (Consequential Provisions) Order 2014
Relates to	Forgery of Foreign Bills Act 1803

Status: Amended

Text of statute as originally enacted

Revised text of statute as amended

Text of the Forgery and Counterfeiting Act 1981 as in force today (including any amendments) within the United Kingdom, from legislation.gov.uk.

The Forgery and Counterfeiting Act 1981 (c. 45) is an act of the Parliament of the United Kingdom which makes it illegal to make fake versions of many things, including legal documents, contracts, audio and visual recordings, and money of the United Kingdom and certain protected coins. It replaces the Forgery Act 1913 (3 & 4 Geo. 5. c. 27), the Coinage Offences Act 1936 (26 Geo. 5 & 1 Edw. 8. c. 16) and parts of the Forgery Act 1861 (24 & 25 Vict. c. 98). It implements recommendations made by the Law Commission in their report on forgery and counterfeit currency.

== Part I – Forgery and kindred offences ==
These offences are the intentional creation and publication of documents which, if not fake, would have legal force. These sections of the law cover all manner of documents, for example wills, contracts, and promissory notes.

Section 1 creates the offence of forgery.

Section 2 creates the offence of copying a false instrument.

Section 3 creates the offence of using a false instrument.

Section 4 creates the offence of using a copy of a false instrument.

Section 13 abolished the common law offence of forgery.

== Part II – Counterfeiting and kindred offences ==
Section 27 defines the expressions "currency note" and "protected coin". This section makes it illegal to forge or counterfeit money. In addition to the money of the United Kingdom it explicitly states that certain foreign coins are protected coins under this act, and counterfeiting them is just as great an offence as counterfeiting coins of the United Kingdom.

=== Protected coin ===
Section 27(1) provides that, in Part II of the act, the expression "protected coin" means any coin which is customarily used as money in any country, or which is specified for the purposes of Part II in an order made by the Treasury.

The following coins have been specified for the purposes of Part II:

- Sovereign
- Half sovereign
- Krugerrand
- Any coin denominated as a fraction of a Krugerrand.
- Maria Theresia thaler bearing the date of 1780
- Any euro coin produced in accordance with Council Regulation No. 975/98/EC (OJ No. L139, 11.5.98, p. 6) by or at the instance of a member state which has adopted the single currency in accordance with the Treaty establishing the European Community

=== Orders made under this section ===
The power conferred on the Treasury by section 27(1) has been exercised by the following orders:

- The Forgery and Counterfeiting (Protected Coins) Order 1981 (S.I. 1981/505)
- The Forgery and Counterfeiting (Protected Coins) Order 1999 (S.I. 1999/2095)

== Part III – Miscellaneous and general ==
Section 29 amended section 63 of the Post Office Act 1953. It was repealed on 26 March 2001 by section 127(6) of, and schedule 9 to, the Postal Services Act 2000.

== Repealed enactments ==
Section 30 of the act repealed 55 enactments and instruments, listed in parts I, II and III of the schedule to the act.

Part I — General repeals consequential on Part I
Citation	Short title	Extent of repeal
32 Geo. 3. c. 56	Servants' Characters Act 1792	In section 1, the word "either", the words "or in writing" and the words "forged or counterfeited". In section 4, the words "forged or counterfeit" and the words from "or shall" to "the same".
6 & 7 Vict. c. 86	London Hackney Carriage Act 1843	In section 14, the words from "or who" to "forged recommendations". Section 20.
24 & 25 Vict. c. 98	Forgery Act 1861	The whole act, so far as unrepealed, except sections 34, 36, 37 and 55.
34 & 35 Vict. c. 96	Pedlars Act 1871	In section 12, paragraphs (2), (4) and (5).
45 & 46 Vict. c. 50	Municipal Corporations Act 1882	Section 235.
48 & 49 Vict. c. 49	Submarine Telegraph Act 1885	Section 8(4).
57 & 58 Vict. c. 60	Merchant Shipping Act 1894	Section 66. In section 104, paragraph (a) and, in paragraph (c), the words "forged, altered". In section 282, paragraph (b) and the word "or" immediately preceding it. In section 564, paragraphs (a) and (b). Section 695(4). Section 722(1).
6 Edw. 7. c. 5	Seamen's and Soldiers' False Characters Act 1906	In section 1(1), the words from "forges" to "discharge, or". In section 2, the words from "any forged" to "employment, or".
3 & 4 Geo. 5. c. 27	Forgery Act 1913	The whole act.
10 & 11 Geo. 5. c. 75	Official Secrets Act 1920	In section 1(1)(c), the words "forges, alters, or", the words "or uses" and the word "such".
15 & 16 Geo. 5. c. 86	Criminal Justice Act 1925	In section 11(3), the words from "against" to the second "or". Section 35. In section 36, in subsection (1), the words "The forgery of any passport or", and subsection (2). Section 38.
21 & 22 Geo. 5. c. 43	Improvement of Live Stock (Licensing of Bulls) Act 1931	In section 8, in subsection (1)(i), the words "forges or", and subsection (2).
24 & 25 Geo. 5. c. 49	Whaling Industry (Regulation) Act 1934	In section 9, in subsection (1)(a), the words "forges or" and the words from "or forges" to "Act", and subsection (2).
9 & 10 Geo. 6. c. 73	Hill Farming Act 1946	In section 19(2)(a), the words from the beginning to "or" in the first place where it occurs.
14 Geo. 6. c. 36	Diseases of Animals Act 1950	Section 78(2)(iv).
1 & 2 Eliz. 2. c. 20	Births and Deaths Registration Act 1953	In section 37, the words "forges or" and the words "or forged".
1 & 2 Eliz. 2. c. 36	Post Office Act 1953	In section 23(1), the words "of the Forgery Act, 1913 and", the word "other" and the words "forgery or", and subsection (2).
2 & 3 Eliz. 2. c. 61	Pharmacy Act 1954	In section 20(2), the words "forges, or" in paragraph (a) and all the words from "In the application" onwards.
6 & 7 Eliz. 2. c. 43	Horse Breeding Act 1958	Section 11.
6 & 7 Eliz. 2. c. 51	Public Records Act 1958	In Schedule 3, the entry relating to the Forgery Act 1913.
7 & 8 Eliz. 2. c. 72	Mental Health Act 1959	Section 125(4). In Part I of Schedule 7, the entry relating to the Forgery Act 1913.
10 & 11 Eliz. 2. c. 8	Civil Aviation (Euro-control) Act 1962	Section 6(5).
10 & 11 Eliz. 2. c. 15	Criminal Justice Administration Act 1962	In Schedule 3, paragraph 7.
1964 c. 26	Licensing Act 1964	Section 36(3). Section 159.
1967 c. 58	Criminal Law Act 1967	In Schedule 2, paragraph 11.
1967 c. 76	Road Traffic Regulation Act 1967	In section 86(1), the words "forges or alters, or" in paragraph (a), and all the words from "In the application" onwards.
1967 c. xx	Greater London Council (General Powers) Act 1967	Section 5(4).
1971 c. 40	Fire Precautions Act 1971	In section 22, in subsection (1)(a), the words "forges a fire certificate or" and subsection (3).
1974 c. 37	Health and Safety at Work etc. Act 1974	In section 33, in subsection (1), the words "forge or" in paragraph (m), and subsection (6).
1974 c. 47	Solicitors Act 1974	In Schedule 3, paragraph 1.
1976 c. 58	International Carriage of Perishable Foodstuffs Act 1976	In section 9, in subsection (1)(a), the words "forges, or alters, or" and subsection (2).
1977 c. 45	Criminal Law Act 1977	In Schedule 2, paragraphs 13 and 21. In Schedule 3, paragraphs 15, 21 and 31.

Part II — General repeals consequential on Part II
Citation	Short title	Extent of repeal
41 Geo. 3. c. 57	Bank Notes Forgery Act 1801	The whole act.
45 Geo. 3. c. 89	Bank Notes (Forgery) Act 1805	The whole act.
1 Geo. 4. c. 92	Bank Notes Forgery (Scotland) Act 1820	The whole act.
39 & 40 Vict. c. 36	Customs Consolidation Act 1876	In section 42, in the Table, the words from "Coin, viz., false money" to "or fineness.".
52 & 53 Vict. c. 42	Revenue Act 1889	Section 2.
55 & 56 Vict. c. 55	Burgh Police (Scotland) Act 1892	Section 380(15).
25 & 26 Geo. 5. c. 25	Counterfeit Currency (Convention) Act 1935	In section 1(1), the words "the Forgery Act, 1913, and". Section 2. Section 6(2).
26 Geo. 5 & 1 Edw. 8. c. 16	Coinage Offences Act 1936	The whole act.
1971 c. 24	Coinage Act 1971	In section 12(1), the words "the Coinage Offences Act 1936 and in" and the words from "and accordingly" onwards. In Schedule 2, the words "The Coinage Offences Act 1936".

Part III — Northern Ireland legislation — repeals consequential on Parts I and II
Citation	Short title	Extent of repeal
12 & 13 Geo. 5. c. 12 (N.I.)	Live Stock Breeding Act (Northern Ireland) 1922	In section 8, the words "forges or" and "alters or".
1945 c. 15 (N.I.)	Criminal Justice Act (Northern Ireland) 1945	Section 27(1) and (2).
1950 c. 3 (N.I.)	Exchequer and Financial Provisions Act (Northern Ireland) 1950	In Schedule 3, the entry relating to the Forgery Act 1913.
1953 c. 14 (N.I.)	Criminal Justice Act (Northern Ireland) 1953	Section 19.
1957 c. 27 (N.I.)	Marketing of Eggs Act (Northern Ireland) 1957	In section 20(2)(b), the words "forges or" and "alters or".
1958 c. 9 (N.I.)	Summary Jurisdiction and Criminal Justice Act (Northern Ireland) 1958	In section 27, in subsection (1), the words "forges a passport or" and subsection (2).
1958 c. 13 (N.I.)	Diseases of Animals Act (Northern Ireland) 1958	Section 45(2)(d).
1961 c. 15 (N.I.)	Mental Health Act (Northern Ireland) 1961	Section 98(4).
1964 c. 21 (N.I.)	Magistrates' Courts Act (Northern Ireland) 1964	In Schedule 3, entries 10 and 12.
1967 c. 29 (N.I.)	Increase of Fines Act (Northern Ireland) 1967	In section 1(8)(c), the words "forgery of a passport and". In Part I of the Schedule, the entry relating to section 19 of the Criminal Justice Act (Northern Ireland) 1953 and, in the entry relating to section 20(2) of the Marketing of Eggs Act (Northern Ireland) 1957, the words "or forgery, etc. of licence or other document".
1967 c. 37 (N.I.)	Transport Act (Northern Ireland) 1967	In section 34(a), the words "forges within the meaning of the Forgery Act 1913, or".
SI 1976/1041 (N.I. 14)	Births and Deaths Registration (Northern Ireland) Order 1976	In Article 45, in paragraph (1), in sub-paragraph (a), the words "forges or" and, in sub-paragraph (b), the words "or forged" and Article 45(2).
SI 1976/1213 (N.I. 22)	Pharmacy (Northern Ireland) Order 1976	In Article 14, in paragraph (5), the words "forges, or" and paragraph (6).
SI 1978/1039 (N.I. 9)	Health and Safety at Work (Northern Ireland) Order 1978	In paragraph 31, in paragraph (1)(a), the words "forges or" and paragraph (7).

== See also ==
- Forgery Act
