= Forgery Act =

Stock short title used in UK legislation

Forgery Act (with its variations) is a stock short title used for legislation in the United Kingdom which relates to forgery and similar offences.

The bill for an act with this short title may have been known as a Forgery Bill during its passage through Parliament.

== List ==
The Forgery Act 1830 (11 Geo. 4. & 1 Will. 4. c. 66)
The Forgery Act 1837 (7 Will. 4 & 1 Vict. c. 84)
The Forgery Act 1861 (24 & 25 Vict. c. 98)
The Forgery Act 1870 (33 & 34 Vict. c. 58)
The Forgery Act 1913 (3 & 4 Geo. 5. c. 27)
The Forgery and Counterfeiting Act 1981 (c. 45)

The Forgery of Foreign Bills Act 1803 (43 Geo. 3. c. 139)

The Bank Notes Forgery Act 1801 (41 Geo. 3. (U.K.) c. 57) (repealed by the Forgery and Counterfeiting Act 1981, s.30 & Sch., Pt.II)
The Bank Notes (Forgery) Act 1805 (45 Geo. 3. c. 89) (repealed by the Forgery and Counterfeiting Act 1981, s.30 & Sch., Pt.II)
The Bank Notes Forgery (Scotland) Act 1820 (1 Geo. 4. c. 92) (repealed by the Forgery and Counterfeiting Act 1981, s.30 & Sch., Pt.II)

The Land Tax Certificates Forgery Act 1812 (52 Geo. 3. c. 143) (repealed by the Forgery Act 1913)

The Counterfeit Currency (Convention) Act 1935 (25 & 26 Geo. 5. c. 25)

The Forgery Acts

The Forgery Acts 1913 and 1935 was the collective title of the Forgery Act 1913 and the provisions of the Counterfeit Currency (Convention) Act 1935 which amended that Act.

== See also ==
List of short titles
