= 1 Geo. 1 =

1 Geo. 1 is a citation that can refer to acts of the Parliament of Great Britain from one of two different sessions:

- 1 Geo. 1. St. 1, acts dated 1714, from the second session of the 4th Parliament of Great Britain which met in August 1714
- 1 Geo. 1. St. 2, acts dated 1714, from the first session of the 5th Parliament of Great Britain which met from March 1715 (1714 OS) until June 1716
