= Forgery Act 1870 =

Act of the Parliament of the United Kingdom

Forgery Act 1870 (Note: Section 1.)
- Act of Parliament
- Parliament of the United Kingdom
- Long title: An Act to further amend the Law relating to indictable offences by Forgery.
- Citation: 33 & 34 Vict. c. 58
- Territorial extent: United Kingdom (Note: Section 2.)

Dates
- Royal assent: 9 August 1870
- Commencement: 9 August 1870 (Note: The Acts of Parliament (Commencement) Act 1793.)
- Repealed: 1 January 1969
Other legislation
Amends	Forgery Act 1861
Amended by	Forgery Act 1913
Repealed by	Theft Act 1968
Relates to	National Debt Act 1870; Statute Law Revision Act 1870

Status: Repealed

Text of statute as originally enacted

The Forgery Act 1870 (33 & 34 Vict. c. 58) was an act of the Parliament of the United Kingdom.

The enactments consolidated by this act and the National Debt Act 1870 (33 & 34 Vict. c. 71) were repealed by section 1 of, and the schedule to, the Statute Law Revision Act 1870 (c. 69).

== Provisions ==
=== Section 1 - Short title ===
Section 1 of the act authorised the citation of this act by its short title.

1. This Act may be cited as The Forgery Act, 1870.

=== Section 2 - Construction and extent of act ===
Section 2 of the act provided that this act had effect as one act with the Forgery Act 1861 (24 & 25 Vict. c. 98), except that this act extended to the United Kingdom.

2. This Act shall have effect as one Act with the Act described in the schedule to this Act, but shall extend to the United Kingdom.

==== Section 3 - Forgery of stock certificates etc ====
Section 3 of the act provided that:

3. If any person forges or alters, or offers, utters, disposes of, or puts off, knowing the same to be forged or altered, any stock certificate or coupon, or any document purporting to be a stock certificate or coupon, issued in pursuance of Part V. of The National Debt Act, 1870, or of any former Act,—or demands or endeavours to obtain or receive any share or interest of or in any stock as defined in The National Debt Act, 1870, or to receive any dividend or money payable in respect thereof, by virtue of any such forged or altered certificate or coupon, or document purporting as aforesaid, knowing the same to be forged or altered,—with intent in any of the cases aforesaid to defraud, he shall be guilty of felony, and being convicted thereof shall be liable, at the discretion of the Court, to be kept in penal servitude for life or for any term not less than five years, or to be imprisoned for any term not exceeding two years, with or without hard labour, and with or without solitary confinement.

=== Section 4 - Personation of owners of stock ===
Section 4 of the act provided that:

4. If any person falsely and deceitfully personates owner of any share or interest of or in any such stock aforesaid, or of any such stock certificate or coupon as aforesaid, and thereby obtains or endeavours to obtain any such certificate or coupon,—or receives or endeavours to receive money due to any such owner, as if such person were the true and lawful owner,—he shall be guilty of felony, and being convicted thereof shall be liable, at the discretion of the Court, to be kept in penal servitude for life or for any term not less than five years, or to be imprisoned for any term not exceeding two years, with or without hard labour, and with or without solitary confinement.

=== Section 5 - Engraving plates etc for stock certificates etc ===
Section 5 of the act provided that:

5. If any person, without lawful authority or excuse, proof whereof shall lie on the party accused, engraves or makes on any plate, wood, stone, or other material any stock certificate or coupon purporting to be such a stock certificate or coupon as aforesaid, or to be such a stock certificate or coupon as aforesaid in blank, or to be a part of such a stock certificate or coupon as aforesaid,—or uses any such plate, wood, stone, or other material for the making or printing any such stock certificate or coupon, or blank stock or coupon as aforesaid, or any part thereof respectively,—or knowingly has in his custody or possession any such plate, wood, stone, or other material,—or knowingly offers, utters, disposes of, or puts off, or has in his custody or possession, any paper on which any such blank stock certificate or coupon as aforesaid, or part of any such stock certificate or coupon as aforesaid, is made or printed,—he shall be guilty of felony, and being convicted thereof shall be liable, at the discretion of the Court, to be kept in penal servitude for any term not exceeding fourteen years and not less than five years, or to be imprisoned for any term not exceeding two years, with or without hard labour, and with or without solitary confinement.

=== Section 6 - Forgery of certificates of transfers of stocks from England to Ireland etc ===
Section 6 of the act provided that:

6. If any person forges or alters, or offers, utters, disposes of, or puts off, knowing the same to be forged or altered, any certificate or duplicate certificate required by Part VI. of The National Debt Act, 1870, or by any former like enactment, with intent in any of the cases aforesaid to defraud, he shall be guilty of felony, and being convicted thereof shall be liable, at the discretion of the Court, to be kept in penal servitude for life, or for any term not less than five years, or to be imprisoned for any term not exceeding two years, with or without hard labour, and with or without solitary confinement.

=== Section 7 - Extension of provisions of Forgery Act to Scotland ===
Section 7 of the act extended sections 2 and 4, and all provisions relative thereto, of the Forgery Act 1861 (24 & 25 Vict. c. 98) and all enactments amending those sections or provisions, or any of them, to Scotland.

7. Sections two and four and all provisions relative thereto of the Act described in the schedule to this Act, and all enactments amending those sections and provisions, or any of them, shall extend to Scotland.

=== Section 8 - Alteration as to Scotland ===
Section 8 of the act provided that:

8. In the application to Scotland of this Act, and of the enactments by this Act extended to Scotland, the term "high crime and offence" shall be substituted for the term "felony."

=== Schedule ===
The schedule to the act read:

Act referred to.
24 & 25 Vict. c. 98.—An Act to consolidate and amend the statute law of England and Ireland, relating to indictable offences by forgery.

The act referred to was the Forgery Act 1861 (24 & 25 Vict. c. 98) (which did not have a short title when this act was passed).

== Subsequent developments ==
Sections 3, 5 and 6 of the act were repealed by section 20 of, and part I of the schedule to, the Forgery Act 1913 (3 & 4 Geo. 5. c. 27), which came into force on 1 January 1914.

The whole act, so far as unrepealed, was repealed for the United Kingdom by section 33(3) of, and part I of schedule 3 to, the Theft Act 1968 (c. 60), which came into force on 1 January 1969..

The whole act was repealed for the Republic of Ireland by section 1 of, and part 4 of schedule 1 to, the Statute Law Revision (Pre-1922) Act 2005, which came into force on 18 December 2005 subject to the savings in section 2 of the act.

== See also ==
- Forgery Act
