= Uttering =

Form of fraud

Uttering is a crime involving a person with the intent to defraud that knowingly sells, publishes or passes a forged or counterfeited document. More specifically, forgery creates a falsified document and uttering is the act of knowingly passing on or using the forged document.

== Background ==
In the law of countries whose legal systems derive from English common law, uttering is a crime similar to forgery. Uttering and forgery were originally common law offences, both misdemeanours. Forgery was the creation of a forged document, with the intent to defraud; whereas uttering was merely use – the passing – of a forged document, that someone else had made, with the intent to defraud. In law, uttering is synonymous with publication, and the distinction made between the common law offences was that forgery was the fabrication of a forged instrument (with the intent to defraud) and uttering was the publication of that instrument (with the intent to defraud). Statute law offences of forgery replace the common law offences nowadays, often subsuming the offence of uttering, and, where the distinction exists, forgery is usually a felony rather than a misdemeanour.

== Law systems ==
=== Canada ===
Uttering a forged document is a criminal offence in Canada, contrary to section 368 of the Criminal Code. It is an indictable offence and is punishable with imprisonment for a term not exceeding ten years.

=== Republic of Ireland ===
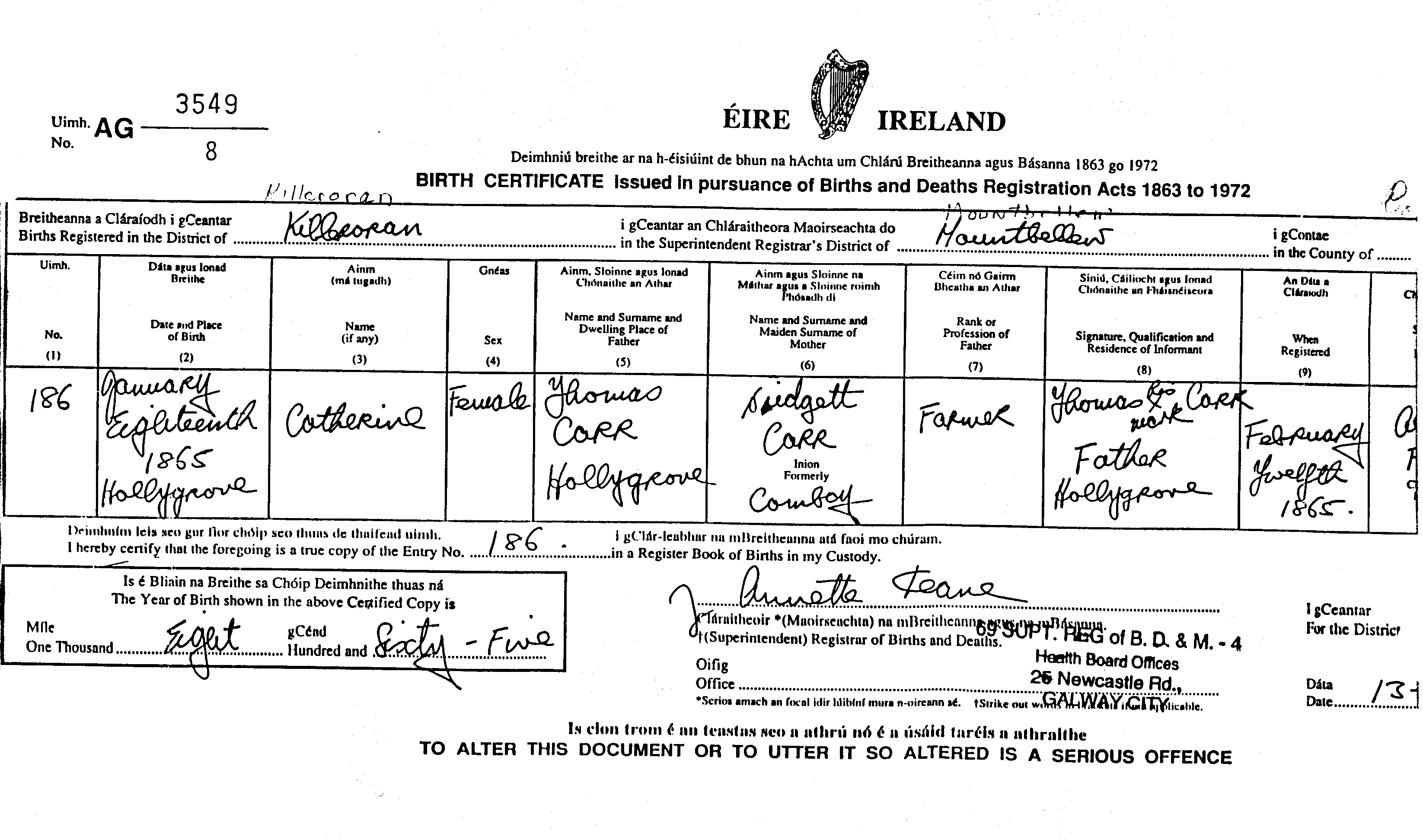
An Irish birth certificate: note the text on the bottom warning To alter this document or to utter it so altered is a serious offence.

Uttering forged documents remains a crime in the Republic of Ireland under the Criminal Justice (Theft and Fraud Offences) Act 2001. Prior to that, the Forgery Act 1837, Forgery Act 1861 and Forgery Act 1913, passed by the Parliament of the United Kingdom of Great Britain and Ireland, remained in force.

=== England, Wales and Northern Ireland ===
Section 36 of the Forgery Act 1861, still in force, creates the offence of, among other things, uttering a forged register or entry in a register, or certificate of births, baptisms, marriages, deaths, or burials, or copy of such an entry. The maximum penalty is life imprisonment. Initially, Section 6 of the Forgery Act 1913, now repealed, created the offence of uttering a forged document, seal, or die. The Act defined all of those terms for that purpose. Section 29(1)(i) of the Larceny Act 1916, now repealed, created the offence of uttering a letter or writing demanding property with menaces.

=== Scotland ===
In Scotland, uttering forged writings is a crime defined as "using as genuine a fabricated writing falsely intended to pass as genuine the writing of another person".

=== United States ===
In the U.S., uttering is the act of offering a forged document to another when the offeror has knowledge that the document is forged. Uttering does not require that the person who presented the document actually forged or altered the document. For example, forging a log for personal profit might be considered uttering and publishing. Another example would be the forging of a university diploma. As an example of the law itself, the State of Michigan defines the offense (MCL 750.249): "Any person who utters and publishes as true any false, forged, altered or counterfeit record, deed, instrument or other writing specified, knowing it to be false, altered, forged, or counterfeit, with intent to injure or defraud is guilty of uttering and publishing."

Forging or illegal "publishing" of an official or unofficial document is not the essence of uttering. Uttering is the actual presentation of forged or official documentation as one's own.

== See also ==
- Counterfeit
- Deception
- Fraud
- Forgery
- Philatelic fakes and forgeries
