= Seamen's and Soldiers' False Characters Act 1906 =

Act of the Parliament of the United Kingdom

Seamen's and Soldiers' False Characters Act 1906 (Note: Section 4.)
- Act of Parliament
- Parliament of the United Kingdom
- Long title: An Act to amend the Law relating to the falsification of Seamen's and Soldiers' Certificates of Service or Discharge, and to false statements made, used, or given in connection with Entry or Enlistment into His Majesty's Naval, Military, or Marine Forces.
- Citation: 6 Edw. 7. c. 5
- Territorial extent: United Kingdom

Dates
- Royal assent: 22 June 1906
- Commencement: 22 June 1906 (Note: The Acts of Parliament (Commencement) Act 1793.)
- Repealed: 21 July 2008
Other legislation
Amends	Naval Enlistment Act 1853
Amended by	Criminal Justice Act 1948; Criminal Justice Act (Northern Ireland) 1953; Criminal Procedure (Scotland) Act 1975; Reserve Forces Act 1980; Forgery and Counterfeiting Act 1981; Criminal Justice Act 1982
Repealed by	Statute Law (Repeals) Act 2008

Status: Repealed

Text of statute as originally enacted

Revised text of statute as amended

The Seamen's and Soldiers' False Characters Act 1906 (6 Edw. 7. c. 5) was an act of the Parliament of the United Kingdom. The act criminalised the forgery of discharge papers, held by those leaving the British armed forces. It also criminalised the use of false character statements by those seeking to join the armed forces and the making of such statements. The act was superseded in part by later legislation and there are no known prosecutions made under it. The act was repealed in 2008 following a recommendation by the Law Commission.

== Description ==
The act was passed at a time when there were many British ex-servicemen seeking employment. A veteran's discharge papers listed his period of service and reason for leaving the forces. They were their only means of explaining to a prospective employer their absence from the civilian workforce during their term of enlistment.

The act, which received royal assent on 22 June 1906, contains three sections. Section 1 criminalised the forging of discharge certificates of seamen or soldiers and also the impersonation of a holder of a certificate. The punishment stipulated by the act was a sentence of imprisonment (with or without hard labour) for a month or a fine of up to £20 for a first offence and a prison term of up to three months for subsequent offences. This section also defined the term "seaman" as any man who had served in His Majesty's naval forces and "soldier" as "a man who has served in His Majesty's military or marine forces".

Section 2 established an offence for any prospective member of the armed forces to use a forged character statement to enter the forces and for any person to create a false statement to support the entry of another into the forces. The penalty for this was a £20 fine.

Section 3 of the act extended a previous offence, under the Naval Enlistment Act 1853 (16 & 17 Vict. c. 69), of making a false statement to gain entry to the naval service to apply also to the naval reserve.

No prosecutions are known to have been made under any sections of the act.

== Repeal ==
The Section 1 offence of forging papers was repealed by the Forgery and Counterfeiting Act 1981. Its only outstanding effect was to criminalise the impersonation of a current or former member of the armed forces. This could also, where the intention was to make a gain or cause another a loss, be prosecuted as a fraud by false representation under the Fraud Act 2006.

Although it remained in force, section 2 of the act was effectively superseded by offences created under the Army Act 1955 (3 & 4 Eliz. 2. c. 18), Air Force Act 1955 (3 & 4 Eliz. 2. c. 19) and Armed Forces Act 1966 (for the Royal Navy) and the Reserve Forces Act 1996, which included greater penalties. Such an offence could also be prosecuted under the Fraud Act 2006.

Because the act was so little used and the offences prosecutable under other acts, the Law Commission recommended repeal of the entire act in its 18th Report on Statute Law Repeals of January 2008.

The whole act was repealed by section 1(1) of, and group 4 of part 1 of schedule 1 to, the Statute Law (Repeals) Act 2008, which came into force on 21 July 2008.

Despite the act being repealed, its prohibition on civilians dressing as a member of the armed forces continues to be regularly featured in lists of "strange UK laws".
