= Forgery of Foreign Bills Act 1803 =

Act of the Parliament of the United Kingdom

Forgery of Foreign Bills Act 1803 (Note: The citation of the act by this short title was authorised by section 1 of, and the first schedule to, the Short Titles Act 1896. Due to the repeal of those provisions, it is now authorised by section 19(2) of the Interpretation Act 1978.)
- Act of Parliament
- Parliament of the United Kingdom
- Long title: An Act for preventing the forging and counterfeiting of Foreign Bills of Exchange, and of Foreign Promissory Notes and Orders for the Payment of Money; and for preventing the counterfeiting of Foreign Copper Money.
- Citation: 43 Geo. 3. c. 139
- Territorial extent: United Kingdom

Dates
- Royal assent: 11 August 1803
- Commencement: 11 August 1803 (Note: The Acts of Parliament (Commencement) Act 1793.)
- Repealed: England and Wales: 21 July 1830; Scotland: 31 January 2013; Northern Ireland: 1 November 1861; Republic of Ireland: 8 May 2007
Other legislation
Amended by	Forgery Act 1830; Statute Law Revision Act 1888; Criminal Statutes Repeal Act 1861; Criminal Statutes Repeal Act 1861
Repealed by	England and Wales: Forgery Act 1830; Scotland: Statute Law (Repeals) Act 2013; Ireland: Criminal Statutes Repeal Act 1861; Republic of Ireland: Statute Law Revision Act 2007
Relates to	Penal Servitude Act 1857; Criminal Procedure (Scotland) Act 1975; Forgery and Counterfeiting Act 1981; Criminal Law (Consolidation) (Scotland) Act 1995

Status: Repealed

Text of statute as originally enacted

Revised text of statute as amended

The Forgery of Foreign Bills Act 1803 (43 Geo. 3. c. 139) was an act of the Parliament of the United Kingdom. Prior to its repeal in 2013, it created offences of forgery of foreign instruments in Scotland.

== Provisions ==
=== Preamble ===
The preamble to the act read:

Whereas the practice of forging and counterfeiting foreign bills of exchange, foreign promissory notes, and foreign orders for payment of money hath of late greatly increased, and plates of such bills, notes, and orders have been in some instances engraven within the United Kingdom of Great Britain and Ireland, whereby such forgeries have been more easily committed; and it is expedient that effectual provision should be made for the preventing of the same:

=== Section 1 ===
In Scotland, section 1 of the act read:

If any person from and after the passing of this Act shall, within any part of the United Kingdom of Great Britain and Ireland, falsely make, forge, or counterfeit, or cause or procure to be falsely made, forged, or counterfeited, or knowingly aid or assist in the false making, forging, or counterfeiting any bill of exchange, or any promissory note, undertaking, or order for the payment of money, purporting to be the bill of exchange, promissory note, undertaking, or order for the payment of money of any foreign prince, state, or country whatsoever, or of any minister or officer entrusted by or employed in the service of any foreign prince, state, or country, or of any person or company of persons resident in any foreign state or country, or of any body corporate and politic, and body in the nature of a body corporate and politic, created or constituted by any foreign prince or state, with intent to deceive or defraud his Majesty, his heirs and successors, or any such foreign prince, state, or country, or with intent to deceive or defraud any person or company of persons whomsoever, or any body corporate and politic, or body in the nature of a body corporate and politic whatsoever, whether the same be respectively resident, carrying on business, constituted or being in any part of the United Kingdom or in any foreign state or country, and whether such bill of exchange, promissory note, or order be in the English language, or in any foreign language or languages, or partly in one and partly in the other; or if any person from and after the passing of this Act shall, within any part of the said United Kingdom, tender in payment or in exchange, or otherwise utter or publish as true any such false, forged, or counterfeited bill of exchange, promissory note, undertaking, or order, knowing the same to be false, forged, or counterfeited, with intent to deceive or defraud his Majesty, his heirs and successors, or any foreign prince, state, or country, or any person or company of persons, or any body corporate and politic, or body in the nature of a body politic and corporate as aforesaid; then every person so offending shall be deemed and taken to be guilty of felony, and being thereof lawfully convicted, shall be transported for any term of years not exceeding fourteen years.

A person guilty of an offence under section 1 of the act was liable to imprisonment for a term not exceeding fourteen years. (Note: Section 2 of the Penal Servitude Act 1857 (20 & 21 Vict. c. 3) and section 221(2) of the Criminal Procedure (Scotland) Act 1975)

=== Section 2 ===
In Scotland, section 2 of the act provided:

And no person from and after the passing of this Act shall, within any part of the United Kingdom of Great Britain and Ireland, engrave, cut, etch, scrape, or by any other means or devise, make or knowingly aid or assist in the engraving, cutting, etching, scraping, or by any other means or devise making in or upon any plate whatsoever any bill of exchange, or any promissory note or undertaking, or order for the payment of money, purporting to be the bill of exchange, promissory note, undertaking, or order of any foreign prince, state, or country, or of any minister or officer entrusted by or employed in the service of any foreign prince, state, or country, or of any person or company of persons resident or being in any foreign state or country, or of any body corporate and politic, or body in the nature of a body corporate and politic, or constituted by any foreign prince or state, or any part of any such bill of exchange, promissory note, undertaking, or order, without an authority in writing for that purpose from such foreign prince, state, or country, minister or officer, person, company of persons or body corporate and politic, or body in the nature of a body corporate and politic, or from some person duly authorized to give such authority, or shall within any part of the said United Kingdom without such authority as aforesaid, by means of any such plate, or by any other device or means, make or print any such foreign bill of exchange, promissory note, undertaking, or order for the payment of money or any part thereof, or knowingly, wilfully, and without lawful excuse (the proof whereof shall lie upon the party accused) have in his or her custody any such plate or device or any impression taken from the same; and if any person shall offend in any of the cases aforesaid, he shall be deemed and taken to be guilty of a misdemeanour and breach of the peace, and being thereof convicted according to law shall be liable for the first offence to be imprisoned for any time not exceeding six months, or to be fined... or to suffer one or more of the said punishments, and for the second offence to be transported to any of his Majesty’s colonies or plantations for the term of fourteen years: Provided always, that nothing in this Act contained shall extend or be construed to extend in any manner whatsoever to repeal or alter any law or statute now in force for the prevention or punishment of the crime of forgery in any respect whatsoever within any part of the said United Kingdom.

A person guilty of a second offence under section 2 of the act was liable to imprisonment for a term not exceeding fourteen years.

== Subsequent developments ==
Sections 1 and 2 of the act were repealed for England and Wales by section 31 of the Forgery Act 1830 (11 Geo. 4 & 1 Will. 4. c. 66), which came into force on 21 July 1830.

Sections 1 and 2 of the act as to Ireland and sections 3 to 8 of the act as for the United Kingdom were repealed by section 1 of, and the schedule to, the Criminal Statutes Repeal Act 1861 (24 & 25 Vict. c. 95), which came into force on 1 November 1861.

The punishment of whipping for a person guilty of an offence under section 2 of the act were repealed for Scotland by section 2 of the Criminal Justice Act 1948 (11 & 12 Geo. 6. c. 58), which came into force on 13 September 1948.

The whole act was repealed for the Republic of Ireland by sections 2(1) and 3(1) of, and part 4 of schedule 2 to, the Statute Law Revision Act 2007, which came into force on 8 May 2007.

The Draft Statute Law (Repeals) Bill 2012, contained in the nineteenth report on statute law revision of the Law Commission and the Scottish Law Commission, proposed repealing the act for Scotland.

The whole act was repealed by section 1 of, and the group 2 of part 2 of the schedule to, the Statute Law (Repeals) Act 2013, which came into force on 31 January 2013.

== See also ==
- Forgery Act
- Scottish criminal law
