= Statute Law Revision Act 1870 =

Act of the Parliament of the United Kingdom

Statute Law Revision Act 1870 (Note: Section 2.)
- Act of Parliament
- Parliament of the United Kingdom
- Long title: An Act for further promoting the revision of the Statute Law by repealing certain enactments that have ceased to be in force or are consolidated by certain Acts of the present Session.
- Citation: 33 & 34 Vict. c. 69
- Introduced by: Robert Lowe MP; James Stansfeld MP; (Commons); Henry Petty-Fitzmaurice, 5th Marquess of Lansdowne (Lords)
- Territorial extent: United Kingdom

Dates
- Royal assent: 9 August 1870
- Commencement: 9 August 1870 (Note: The Acts of Parliament (Commencement) Act 1793.)
- Repealed: 2 May 1986
Other legislation
Amends	See § Repealed enactments
Repeals/revokes	See § Repealed enactments
Amended by	Statute Law Revision Act 1894
Repealed by	Statute Law (Repeals) Act 1986
Relates to	Repeal of Obsolete Statutes Act 1856; See Statute Law Revision Act

Status: Repealed

History of passage through Parliament

Records of Parliamentary debate relating to the statute from Hansard

Text of statute as originally enacted

The Statute Law Revision Act 1870 (33 & 34 Vict. c. 69) was an act of the Parliament of the United Kingdom that repealed for the United Kingdom enactments relating to the National Debt and to forgery which had ceased to be in force or had become necessary. The act was intended, in particular, to facilitate the preparation of the revised edition of the statutes, then in progress.

The act repealed enactments consolidated by the Forgery Act 1870 (33 & 34 Vict. c. 58) and National Debt Act 1870 (c. 71).

== Background ==
In the United Kingdom, acts of Parliament remain in force until expressly repealed. Blackstone's Commentaries on the Laws of England, published in the late 18th-century, raised questions about the system and structure of the common law and the poor drafting and disorder of the existing statute book.

From 1810 to 1825, The Statutes of the Realm was published, providing the first authoritative collection of acts. The first statute law revision act was not passed until 1856 with the Repeal of Obsolete Statutes Act 1856 (19 & 20 Vict. c. 64). This approach — focusing on removing obsolete laws from the statute book followed by consolidation — was proposed by Peter Locke King MP, who had been highly critical of previous commissions' approaches, expenditures, and lack of results.

Previous statute law revision acts
Year passed	Title	Citation	Effect
1861	Statute Law Revision Act 1861	24 & 25 Vict. c. 101	Repealed or amended over 800 enactments
1863	Statute Law Revision Act 1863	26 & 27 Vict. c. 125	Repealed or amended over 1,600 enactments for England and Wales
1867	Statute Law Revision Act 1867	30 & 31 Vict. c. 59	Repealed or amended over 1,380 enactments

== Passage ==
The Statute Law Revision Bill had its first reading in the House of Commons on 12 July 1870, introduced by the Chancellor of the Exchequer, Robert Lowe MP and Financial Secretary to the Treasury, James Stansfeld MP. The bill had its second reading in the House of Commons on 18 July 1870 and was committed to a committee of the whole house, which met and reported on 25 July 1870, without amendments. The bill had its third reading in the House of Commons on 26 July 1870 and passed, without amendments.

The bill had its first reading in the House of Lords on 28 July 1870, introduced by the Lord Commissioner of the Treasury, Henry Petty-Fitzmaurice, 5th Marquess of Lansdowne. The bill had its second reading in the House of Lords on 2 August 1870 and was committed to a committee of the whole house, which met on 4 August 1870, and reported on 5 August 1870, with amendments. The amended bill had its third reading in the House of Lords on 6 August 1870 and passed, without amendments.

The amended bill was considered and agreed to by the House of Commons on 8 August 1870.

The bill was granted royal assent on 9 August 1870.

== Subsequent developments ==
The act was intended, in particular, to facilitate the preparation of a revised edition of the statutes.

The schedule to the act was repealed by section 1 of, and the first schedule to, the Statute Law Revision Act 1894 (57 & 58 Vict. c. 54), which came into force on 25 August 1894.

The whole act was repealed by section 1(1) of, and the part XIII of schedule 1 to, the Statute Law (Repeals) Act 1986, which came into force on 2 May 1986.

The act was retained for the Republic of Ireland by section 2(2)(a) of, and part 4 of schedule 1 to, the Statute Law Revision Act 2007, which came into force on 8 May 2007.

== Repealed enactments ==
Section 1 of the act repealed 251 enactments, listed in the schedule to the act, across six categories: (Note: The Note of the bill, unlike the schedule, gives commentary on each act, noting any earlier repeals and the reason for the new repeal.)

- Expired
- Spent
- Repealed in general terms
- Virtually repealed
- Superseded
- Obsolete

Section 1 of the act included several safeguards to ensure that the repeal does not negatively affect existing rights or ongoing legal matters. Specifically, any legal rights, privileges, or remedies already obtained under the repealed laws, as well as any legal proceedings or principles established by them, remain unaffected. Section 1 of the act also ensured that repealed enactments that have been incorporated into other laws would continue to have legal effect in those contexts. Moreover, the repeal would not revive any former rights, offices, or jurisdictions that had already been abolished.

Citation	Short title	Title	Extent of repeal
9 Gul. 3. c. 3.	Bank of England Act 1697	An Act to give further time for the administering of oaths relating to talleys & orders and for the easier dispatch of the publick businesse in the Exchequer & in the Bank of England.	The whole act.
1 Geo. 1. Stat. 1. c. 2	National Debt Act 1714	An Act for rectifying mistakes in the names of the Commissioners for the Land Tax for the year one thousand seven hundred and fourteen; and for raising so much as is wanting to make up the sum of fourteen hundred thousand pounds, intended to be raised by a lottery for the publick service in the said year.	The whole act.
1 Geo. 1. Stat. 2. c. 12	National Debt (No. 2) Act 1714	An Act the title of which begins with the words,—An Act for enlarging the fund of the governor and company of the Bank of England relating to Exchequer-Bills,—and ends with the words,—and for other purposes therein mentioned.	The whole act.
1 Geo. 1. Stat. 2. c. 19	National Debt (No. 3) Act 1714	An Act for raising nine hundred and ten thousand pounds for publick services, by sale of annuities, after the rate of five pounds per centum per annum, redeemable by Parliament; and to authorize a treaty concerning private rights claimed by the proprietors of the sugar-houses in Scotland.	The whole act.
1 Geo. 1. Stat. 2. c. 21	National Debt (No. 4) Act 1714	An Act the title of which begins with the words,—An Act for enlarging the capital stock and yearly fund of the South-Sea Company,—and ends with the words,—and for appropriating several supplies granted to His Majesty.	The whole act.
3 Geo. 1. c. 7	National Debt Act 1716	An Act the title of which begins with the words,—An Act for redeeming the duties and revenues which were settled to pay off principal and interest on the orders made forth on four lottery Acts,—and ends with the words,—and for taking off the duties on linseed imported, and British linen exported.	The whole act.
3 Geo. 1. c. 8	Bank of England Act 1716	An Act the title of which begins with the words,—An Act for redeeming several funds,—and ends with the words,—and for other purposes in this Act mentioned.	Sections one to thirty-seven, forty to forty-four, forty-six to fifty-two, and section fifty-four to end of Act.
3 Geo. 1. c. 9	National Debt (No. 2) Act 1716	An Act the title of which begins with the words,—An Act for redeeming the yearly fund of the South-Sea Company,—and ends with the words,—time and manner thereby prescribed.	The whole act.
4 Geo. 1. c. 10	National Debt Act 1717	An Act for making the dividends of subscribed lottery-annuities, and other annuities established by several Acts of Parliament, more easily payable at the Bank of England.	The whole act.
5 Geo. 1. c. 3.	National Debt Act 1718	An Act for applying certain overplus monies, and further sums to be raised, as well by way of a lottery, as by loans, towards paying off and cancelling exchequer-bills, and for lessening the present great charge in relation to those bills; and for circulating and exchanging for ready money the residue of the same bills for the future.	The whole act.
5 Geo. 1. c. 9	National Debt (No. 2) Act 1718	An Act for continuing certain duties upon coals and culm, and for establishing certain funds to raise money, as well to proceed in the building of new churches, as also to compleat the supply granted to His Majesty; and to reserve the overplus monies of the said duties for the disposition of Parliament; and for more effectual suppressing private lotteries.	The whole act.
5 Geo. 1. c. 19	National Debt (No. 3) Act 1718	An Act the title of which begins with the words,—An Act for redeeming the fund appropriated for payment of the lottery-tickets,—and ends with the words,—and to limit times for prosecutions upon bonds for exporting cards and dice.	The whole act.
6 Geo. 1. c. 4	National Debt Act 1719	An Act the title of which begins with the words,—An Act for enabling the South-Sea Company,—and ends with the words,—demand at or near the exchequer.	The whole act.
6 Geo. 1. c. 10	National Debt (No. 2) Act 1719	An Act the title of which begins with the words,—An Act for making forth new exchequer-bills,—and ends with the words,—and for circulating and exchanging upon demand the same.	The whole act.
6 Geo. 1. c. 11	Plate Duty Act 1719	An Act the title of which begins with the words,—An Act for laying a duty upon wrought plate,—and ends with the words,—senna imported in the year one thousand seven hundred and sixteen.	Sections four to forty, and forty-two to end of Act.
7 Geo. 1. St. 1. c. 5	National Debt Act 1720	An Act to enable the South-Sea Company to ingraft part of their capital stock and fund into the stock and fund of the Bank of England, and another part thereof into the stock and fund of the East-India Company; and for giving further time for payments to be made by the said South-Sea Company, to the use of the publick.	The whole act.
7 Geo. 1. St. 1. c. 27	Pension Duties Act 1720	An Act the title of which begins with the words,—An Act for raising a sum not exceeding five hundred thousand pounds,—and ends with the words,—and for making good a deficiency to the East-India Company.	Except section nineteen
7 Geo. 1. St. 2. c. 1	National Debt Act 1721	An Act for making several provisions to restore the publick credit, which suffers by the frauds and mismanagements of the late directors of the South-Sea Company and others.	The whole act.
8 Geo. 1. c. 20	National Debt (No. 2) Act 1721	An Act the title of which begins with the words,—An Act for paying off and cancelling one million of exchequer-bills,—and ends with the words,—and for ascertaining the duties on pictures imported.	The whole act.
8 Geo. 1. c. 21	South Sea Company Act 1721	An Act the title of which begins with the words,—An Act for relief of the South-Sea Company,—and ends with the words,—touching payment of ten per centum therein mentioned.	Sections one to three, five, six, eight, nine, section eleven from "and that the part or parts" to end of that section, and section sixteen to end of Act.
8 Geo. 1. c. 22	National Debt (No. 3) Act 1721	An Act to prevent the mischief by forging powers to transfer stocks or to receive such annuities or dividends as are therein mentioned, or by fraudulently personating the true owners thereof; and to rectify mistakes of the late managers for taking subscriptions for increasing the capital stock of the South-Sea Company, and in the instruments founded there-upon.	The whole act.
9 Geo. 1. c. 5	National Debt Act 1722	An Act for redeeming certain annuities, now payable by the cashier of the Bank of England, at the rate of five pounds per centum per annum.	The whole act.
9 Geo. 1. c. 6	National Debt (No. 2) Act 1722	An Act the title of which begins with the words,—An Act for reviving and adding two millions to the capital stock of the South-Sea Company,—and ends with the words,—and for continuing, for one year longer, the provision formerly made against requiring special bail in actions or suits upon such contracts as are therein mentioned.	The whole act.
9 Geo. 1. c. 12	National Debt (No. 3) Act 1722	An Act for the more easy assigning or transferring certain redeemable annuities, payable at the Exchequer, by endorsements on the standing orders for the same.	The whole act.
10 Geo. 1. c. 5	National Debt Act 1723	An Act the title of which begins with the words,—An Act for redeeming certain annuities after the rate of five pounds per centum per annum,—and ends with the words,—and for granting relief to Catherine Collingwood, widow.	The whole act.
11 Geo. 1. c. 9	National Debt Reduction Act 1724	An Act the title of which begins with the words,—An Act for continuing several annuities,—and ends with the words,—bank-bills or notes.	Section six.
11 Geo. 1. c. 17	National Debt Act 1724	An Act for redeeming the annuities of twenty-five thousand pounds per annum, charged on the civil list revenues, by an Act of the seventh year of His Majesty's reign; and for discharging the debts and arrears due from His Majesty to his servants, tradesmen, and others.	The whole act.
12 Geo. 1. c. 2	Pension Duties Act 1725	An Act for granting to His Majesty the sum of one million, to be raised by way of a lottery.	Section two to end of Act.
13 Geo. 1. c. 3.	National Debt Act 1726	An Act the title of which begins with the words,—An Act for redeeming sundry annuities transferrable at the Bank of England,—and ends with the words,—the sufferers at Nevis and St. Christopher's, so far as the same will extend.	The whole act.
13 Geo. 1. c. 21	National Debt Act 1726	An Act the title of which begins with the words,—An Act for granting to His Majesty the sum of three hundred and seventy thousand pounds,—and ends with the words,—since made perpetual.	The whole act.
1 Geo. 2. St. 2. c. 8	Bank of England Act 1727	An Act the title of which begins with the words,—An Act for granting an aid to His Majesty,—and ends with the words,—and for applying the arrears of His late Majesty's civil list revenues.	Sections one to four, six, seven, nine to eleven, section twelve from "and from and after" to end of that section, section fourteen, and section sixteen to end of Act.
2 Geo. 2. c. 3.	Bank of England Act 1728	An Act for raising the sum of one million two hundred and fifty thousand pounds by sale of annuities to the Bank of England, after the rate of four pounds per centum per annum, redeemable by Parliament; and for applying the produce of the sinking fund.	Sections one to four, six, eight to ten, section eleven from "and from and after" to end of that section, section thirteen, and section fifteen to end of Act.
3 Geo. 2. c. 16	National Debt Act 1729	An Act the title of which begins with the words,—An Act for raising five hundred and fifty thousand pounds,—and ends with the words,—by the receiver general for the county of Salop.	The whole act.
4 Geo. 2. c. 5	National Debt Act 1730	An Act for the further application of the sinking fund, by paying off one million of South-Sea annuities.	The whole act.
4 Geo. 2. c. 9	National Debt (No. 2) Act 1730	An Act for raising one million two hundred thousand pounds by annuities and a lottery, in manner therein mentioned; and for appropriating the supplies granted in this session of Parliament, and for making forth duplicates of exchequer bills, lottery tickets and orders, lost, burnt or otherwise destroyed.	The whole act.
5 Geo. 2. c. 17	National Debt Act 1731	An Act for the further application of the sinking fund, and by paying of one million of South-Sea stock; and for appropriating the supplies granted in this session of Parliament; and for making forth duplicates of exchequer bills, lottery tickets and orders, lost, burnt or otherwise destroyed.	The whole act.
6 Geo. 2. c. 28	National Debt Act 1732	An Act for the converting a further part of the capital stock of the South-Sea Company into annuities redeemable by Parliament, and for settling the remaining part of the said stock in the said Company.	The whole act.
9 Geo. 2. c. 34	National Debt Act 1735	An Act the title of which begins with the words,—An Act for enabling His Majesty to borrow,—and ends with the words,—and for appropriating the supplies granted in this session of Parliament.	The whole act.
10 Geo. 2. c. 17	National Debt Act 1736	An Act the title of which begins with the words,—An Act for repealing the present duty on sweets,—and ends with the words,—orders lost, burnt, or otherwise destroyed.	The whole act.
11 Geo. 2. c. 27	National Debt Act 1737	An Act the title of which begins with the words,—An Act for granting to His Majesty the sum of two millions,—and ends with the words,—and for the further appropriating the supplies granted in this session of Parliament.	The whole act.
15 Geo. 2. c. 13	Bank of England Act 1741	An Act for establishing an agreement with the governor and company of the Bank of England, for advancing the sum of one million six hundred thousand pounds, towards the supply for the service of the year one thousand seven hundred and forty-two.	Sections one to five and nine to eleven.
15 Geo. 2. c. 19	National Debt Act 1741	An Act for granting to His Majesty the sum of eight hundred thousand pounds, to be raised by annuities transferrable at the Bank of England; and for ascertaining the customs and duties upon quicsilver taken as prize during the present war; and for appropriating the supplies granted in this session of Parliament.	The whole act.
16 Geo. 2. c.12.	National Debt Act 1742	An Act the title of which begins with the words,—An Act for repealing the several rates and duties upon victuallers and retailers of beer and ale,—and ends with the words,—duties for licences.	The whole act.
16 Geo. 2. c.13.	National Debt (No. 2) Act 1742	An Act for raising by annuities and a lottery in manner therein mentioned, the sum of one million eight hundred thousand pounds, at three pounds per centum per annum, for the service of the year one thousand seven hundred and forty-three.	The whole act.
17 Geo. 2. c.18.	National Debt Act 1743	An Act for raising by annuities, and a lottery, in manner therein mentioned, the sum of one million eight hundred thousand pounds, at three pounds per centum per annum, for the service of the year one thousand seven hundred and forty-four.	The whole act.
18 Geo. 2. c. 9	National Debt Act 1744	An Act for granting to His Majesty several additional duties upon all wines imported into Great Britain; and for raising a certain sum of money by annuities, and a lottery, in manner therein mentioned, to be charged on the said additional duties.	The whole act.
19 Geo. 2. c. 6	Bank of England Act 1745	An Act for establishing an agreement with the governor and company of the Bank of England, for cancelling certain exchequer bills upon the terms therein mentioned; and for obliging them to advance the sum of one million upon the credit of the land-tax and malt duties, granted to His Majesty for the service of the year one thousand seven hundred and forty-six.	Sections one, two, four, six, seven, nine, ten, and section fifteen to end of Act.
19 Geo. 2. c. 12	National Debt Act 1745	An Act the title of which begins with the words,—An Act for granting to His Majesty several rates and duties upon glass, and upon spirituous liquors,—and ends with the words,—last session of Parliament.	The whole act.
20 Geo. 2. c. 3.	National Debt Act 1746	An Act for continuing the several rates and duties upon houses, windows and lights; and for granting to His Majesty other rates and duties upon houses, windows or lights; and for raising the sum of four millions four hundred thousand pounds by annuities, to be charged on the said rates and duties.	The whole act.
20 Geo. 2. c. 10	National Debt (No. 2) Act 1746	An Act for granting to His Majesty several rates and duties upon coaches, and other carriages therein mentioned; and for raising the sum of one million, by way of lottery, to be charged upon the said rates and duties.	The whole act.
21 Geo. 2. c. 2	National Debt Act 1747	An Act the title of which begins with the words,—An Act for granting to His Majesty a subsidy of poundage,—and ends with the words,—as enacts that raw goat skins and kid skins may be exported without paying any duty of custom or excise for the same.	The whole act.
22 Geo. 2. c. 23	National Debt Act 1748	An Act to charge the sinking fund with the payment of annuities in discharge of navy, victualling and transport bills, and ordnance debentures, to the amount therein mentioned.	The whole act.
23 Geo. 2. c. 1	National Debt (No. 1) Act 1749	An Act for reducing the several annuities which now carry an interest after the rate of four pounds per centum per annum, to the several rates of interest therein mentioned.	Except so far as relates to interest on the debt from the public to the governor and company of the Bank of England.
23 Geo. 2. c. 16	National Debt Act 1749	An Act for granting to His Majesty the sum of one million, to be raised by annuities at three pounds per centum per annum, and charged on the sinking fund, transferrable at the Bank of England.	The whole act.
23 Geo. 2. c. 22	National Debt (No. 2) Act 1749	An Act for giving further time to the proprietors of annuities, after the rate of four pounds per centum per annum, to subscribe the same in the manner and upon the terms therein mentioned; and for redeeming such of the said annuities as shall not be so subscribed; and for empowering the East India Company to raise certain sums by transferrable annuities.	Except so far as relates to interest on the debt from the public to the governor and company of the Bank of England.
24 Geo. 2. c. 2	National Debt Act 1750	An Act for granting to His Majesty the sum of two millions one hundred thousand pounds, to be raised by annuities and a lottery, and charged on the sinking fund, redeemable by Parliament.	The whole act.
24 Geo. 2. c. 4	Bank of England Act 1750	An Act the title of which begins with the words,—An Act for enabling His Majesty to raise the several sums of money therein mentioned,— and ends with the words,—annuities omitted to be subscribed, pursuant to two Acts of the last session of Parliament.	Except sections twenty-one and twenty-two.
24 Geo. 2. c. 11	National Debt (No. 2) Act 1750	An Act for reducing the interest upon the capital stock of the South Sea Company, from the time and upon the terms therein mentioned; and for preventing of frauds committed by the officers and servants of the said Company.	The whole act.
25 Geo. 2. c. 25	National Debt Act 1751	An Act the title of which begins with the words,—An Act for granting to His Majesty a certain sum of money therein mentioned,—and ends with the words,—and for the further appropriating the supplies granted in this session of Parliament.	The whole act.
25 Geo. 2. c. 27	National Debt (No. 2) Act 1751	An Act for converting the several annuities therein mentioned into several joint stocks of annuities, transferrable at the Bank of England, to be charged on the sinking fund; and also for consolidating the several other annuities therein mentioned, into several joint stocks of annuities, transferrable at the South-Sea House.	The whole act.
26 Geo. 2. c. 1	National Debt Act 1753	An Act the title of which begins with the words,—An Act for continuing and granting to His Majesty certain duties upon malt, mum, cyder and perry, —and ends with the words,—into the joint stock of annuities therein mentioned.	The whole act.
26 Geo. 2. c. 23	National Debt (No. 2) Act 1753	An Act the title of which begins with the words,—An Act for granting to His Majesty a certain sum of money therein mentioned, out of the sinking fund,—and ends with the words,—and for other purposes therein mentioned.	The whole act.
28 Geo. 2. c. 15	National Debt Act 1755	An Act for granting to His Majesty the sum of one million, to be raised by a lottery.	The whole act.
29 Geo. 2. c. 7	National Debt Act 1756	An Act for granting to His Majesty the sum of two millions, to be raised by way of annuities and a lottery, and charged on the sinking fund, redeemable by Parliament; and for extending to Ireland the laws made in this kingdom against private and unlawful lotteries.	The whole act.
30 Geo. 2. c. 19	National Debt Act 1757	An Act the title of which begins with the words,—An Act for granting to His Majesty several rates and duties upon indentures, leases, bonds, and other deeds,—and ends with the words,—and to be paid for the indentures and contracts of clerks and apprentices.	The whole act.
31 Geo. 2. c. 22	Traffic on Highways Act 1757	An Act for granting to His Majesty several rates and duties upon offices and pensions; and upon houses; and upon windows or lights; and for raising the sum of five millions by annuities and a lottery, to be charged on the said rates and duties.	Sections eight, nine, and thirty-one to seventy-eight.
32 Geo. 2. c. 10	National Debt Act 1758	An Act the title of which begins with the words,—An Act for granting to His Majesty a subsidy of poundage,—and ends with the words,—additional inland duty.	The whole act.
32 Geo. 2. c. 22	National Debt (No. 2) Act 1758	An Act the title of which begins with the words,—An Act for adding certain annuities,—and ends with the words,—on the produce of the said fund.	The whole act.
33 Geo. 2. c. 7	Malt Duties, etc. Act 1759	An Act the title of which begins with the words,—An Act for granting to His Majesty several duties upon malt,—and ends with the words,— orders, lost, burnt, or otherwise destroyed.	Except section sixteen.
33 Geo. 2. c. 12	National Debt Act 1759	An Act the title of which begins with the words,—An Act for adding certain annuities granted in the year one thousand seven hundred and sixty,— and ends with the words,—not disposed of.	The whole act.
1 Geo. 3. c. 7	National Debt Act 1760	An Act for granting to His Majesty an additional duty upon strong beer and ale; and for raising the sum of twelve millions, by way of annuities and a lottery, to be charged on the said duty; and for further encouraging the exportation of strong beer and ale.	The whole act.
2 Geo. 3. c. 9	National Debt Act 1761	An Act the title of which begins with the words,—An Act for charging certain annuities,—and ends with the words,—and other orders lost, burnt, or otherwise destroyed.	The whole act.
2 Geo. 3. c. 10	National Debt (No. 2) Act 1761	An Act for raising by annuities, in manner therein mentioned, the sum of twelve millions, to be charged on the surpluses of certain duties on spirituous liquors, and also the monies arising from the duties on spirituous liquors, granted by an Act of this session of Parliament.	The whole act.
3 Geo. 3. c. 9	National Debt Act 1762	An Act for granting annuities to satisfy certain navy, victualling, and transport bills, and ordnance debentures; and for charging the payment of such annuities on the sinking fund; and making good the same to the said fund, in manner therein mentioned.	The whole act.
3 Geo. 3. c. 12	National Debt (No. 2) Act 1762	An Act for granting to His Majesty several additional duties upon wines imported into this kingdom, and certain duties upon all cyder and perry; and for raising the sum of three millions five hundred thousand pounds by way of annuities and lotteries, to be charged on the said duties.	The whole act.
4 Geo. 3. c. 18	National Debt Act 1763	An Act the title of which begins with the words,—An Act for charging on the sinking fund certain annuities,—and ends with the words,—annuities granted by an Act passed in the second year of His present Majesty's reign.	The whole act.
4 Geo. 3. c. 25	National Debt (No. 2) Act 1763	An Act the title of which begins with the words,—An Act for establishing an agreement with the governor and company of the Bank of England,—and ends with the words,—and the fraudulent personating the owners thereof.	The whole act.
5 Geo. 3. c. 16	National Debt Act 1765	An Act for altering the times of payment of certain annuities, established by two Acts made in the thirty-third year of the reign of His late Majesty, and in the second year of the reign of His present Majesty.	The whole act.
5 Geo. 3. c. 23	National Debt (No. 2) Act 1765	An Act for raising, by way of annuities and a lottery, the sum of three millions, to satisfy and discharge certain navy, victualling, and transport bills, and for charging the payment of such annuities on the sinking fund.	The whole act.
5 Geo. 3. c. 42	National Debt (No. 3) Act 1765	An Act for redeeming one-fourth part of the joint stock of annuities established by an Act made in the third year of His present Majesty's reign, in respect of several navy, victualling, and transport bills, and ordnance debentures.	The whole act.
6 Geo. 3. c. 21	National Debt Act 1766	An Act for redeeming one-third part of the remainder of the joint stock of annuities, established by an Act made in the third year of His present Majesty's reign, in respect of several navy, victualling, and transport bills, and ordnance debentures.	The whole act.
6 Geo. 3. c. 39	National Debt (No. 2) Act 1766	An Act for raising the sum of one million five hundred thousand pounds, by way of annuities and a lottery, to be charged on the sinking fund.	The whole act.
7 Geo. 3. c. 24	National Debt (No. 3) Act 1766	An Act for raising the sum of one million five hundred thousand pounds, by way of annuities, and a lottery attended with annuities, to be charged on the sinking fund.	The whole act.
7 Geo. 3. c. 25	National Debt (No. 4) Act 1766	An Act the title of which begins with the words,—An Act for redeeming one-fourth part of the joint stock annuities,—and ends with the words,—to be charged on the said duties.	The whole act.
7 Geo. 3. c. 26	National Debt (No. 5) Act 1766	An Act for redeeming the remainder of the joint stock of annuities established by an Act made in the third year of His present Majesty's reign, in respect of several navy, victualling, and transport bills, and ordnance debentures.	The whole act.
8 Geo. 3. c. 29	National Debt Act 1768	An Act the title of which begins with the words,—An Act for redeeming the remainder of the joint stock of annuities,—and ends with the words,—to be charged on the said duties.	The whole act.
8 Geo. 3. c. 31	National Debt (No. 2) Act 1768	An Act the title of which begins with the words,—An Act for raising a certain sum of money,—and ends with the words,—to the said fund.	The whole act.
10 Geo. 3. c. 36	National Debt Act 1770	An Act the title of which begins with the words,—An Act for redeeming the capital or joint stock of annuities,—and ends with the words,—private and unlawful lotteries.	The whole act.
10 Geo. 3. c. 46	National Debt (No. 2) Act 1770	An Act for establishing a lottery, and for other purposes therein mentioned.	The whole act.
12 Geo. 3. c. 63	National Debt Act 1772	An Act for redeeming one million five hundred thousand pounds of the capital stocks of three pounds per centum annuities, in the manner, and on the terms therein mentioned; and for establishing a lottery.	The whole act.
14 Geo. 3. c. 76	National Debt Act 1774	An Act for redeeming the sum of one million of the capital stocks of three pounds per centum annuities, in the manner and on the terms therein mentioned; and for establishing a lottery.	The whole act.
15 Geo. 3. c. 41	National Debt Act 1775	An Act for redeeming the sum of one million of the capital stocks of three pounds per centum annuities, in the manner and on the terms therein mentioned; and for establishing a lottery.	The whole act.
16 Geo. 3. c. 34	Taxation Act 1776	An Act for granting to His Majesty several duties on coaches, and other carriages therein mentioned; and several rates and duties upon indentures, leases, bonds, and other deeds; and upon cards, dice, and newspapers; and for raising the sum of two millions by annuities, and a lottery, to be attended with annuities.	The whole act.
17 Geo. 3. c. 46	National Debt Act 1776	An Act for raising a certain sum of money by way of annuities, and for establishing a lottery.	The whole act.
18 Geo. 3. c. 22	National Debt Act 1778	An Act for raising a certain sum of money by way of annuities, and for establishing a lottery.	The whole act.
19 Geo. 3. c. 18	National Debt Act 1779	An Act for raising a certain sum of money by way of annuities, and for establishing a lottery.	The whole act.
20 Geo. 3. c. 16	National Debt Act 1780	An Act for raising a certain sum of money by way of annuities, and for establishing a lottery.	The whole act.
21 Geo. 3. c. 14	Lotteries (Ireland) Act 1780	An Act the title of which begins with the words,—An Act for raising a certain sum by way of annuities, and a lottery,—and ends with the words,—fifth year of the reign of His present Majesty.	Except section sixty.
22 Geo. 3. c. 8	National Debt Act 1782	An Act for raising a certain sum of money by way of annuities, and for establishing a lottery.	The whole act.
22 Geo. 3. c. 34	National Debt (No. 2) Act 1782	An Act the title of which begins with the words,—An Act for raising a certain sum of money by loans or exchequer bills,—and ends with the words,—and several subsequent Acts.	The whole act.
23 Geo. 3. c. 35	National Debt Act 1783	An Act for raising a certain sum of money by way of annuities, and for establishing a lottery.	The whole act.
24 Geo. 3. Sess. 2. c. 10	National Debt Act 1784	An Act for raising a certain sum of money by way of annuities, and for establishing a lottery.	The whole act.
24 Geo. 3. Sess. 2. c. 32	Bank of England Act 1784	An Act to postpone the payment of the sum of two millions, advanced by the governor and company of the Bank of England, towards the supply for the service of the year one thousand seven hundred and eighty-one.	The whole act.
24 Geo. 3. Sess. 2. c. 37	National Debt (No. 2) Act 1784	An Act the title of which begins with the words,—An Act for granting to His Majesty certain additional rates of postage,—and ends with the words,—free from postage.	The whole act.
24 Geo. 3. Sess. 2. c. 39	National Debt (No. 3) Act 1784	An Act for granting annuities to satisfy certain navy, victualling, and transport bills, and ordnance debentures.	The whole act.
25 Geo. 3. c. 32	National Debt Act 1785	An Act for granting annuities to satisfy certain navy, victualling, and transport bills, and ordnance debentures.	The whole act.
25 Geo. 3. c. 71	National Debt (No. 2) Act 1785	An Act for extending the time limited, by an Act of this session, for delivering in navy, victualling, and transport bills.	The whole act.
25 Geo. 3. c. 83	Bank of England Act 1785	An Act for further postponing the payment of the sum of two millions, advanced by the governor and company of the Bank of England, towards the supply for the service of the year one thousand seven hundred and eighty-one.	The whole act.
26 Geo. 3. c. 34	National Debt Act 1786	An Act for altering the days of payment of the long annuities, and annuities for thirty and twenty-nine years.	The whole act.
29 Geo. 3. c. 37	National Debt Act 1789	An Act for raising a certain sum of money by way of annuities.	The whole act.
31 Geo. 3. c. 33	Bank of England Act 1791	An Act for the payment of the sum of five hundred thousand pounds by the governor and company of the Bank of England into the receipt of His Majesty's exchequer.	The whole act.
33 Geo. 3. c. 28	National Debt Act 1793	An Act raising a certain sum of money, by way of annuities, to be charged on the Consolidated Fund; and for making perpetual certain duties of excise on British spirits, and certain duties on the amount of assessed taxes.	The whole act.
33 Geo. 3. c. 32	National Debt (No. 2) Act 1793	An Act the title of which begins with the words,—An Act for enabling His Majesty to raise the sum of one million five hundred thousand pounds,—and ends with the words,—Bank of England.	The whole act.
33 Geo. 3. c. 47	East India Company (Money) Act 1793	An Act the title of which begins with the words,—An Act for placing the stock called East India annuities under the management,—and ends with the words,—debts of the said company.	Except section eight to end of Act.
34 Geo. 3. c. 1	National Debt Act 1794	An Act for raising the sum of eleven millions by way of annuities.	The whole act.
34 Geo. 3. c. 21	National Debt (No. 2) Act 1794	An Act for granting annuities to satisfy certain navy and victualling bills; and for providing for the regular payment of all navy and victualling bills that shall be issued in future.	The whole act.
35 Geo. 3. c. 14	National Debt Act 1795	An Act for raising the sum of eighteen millions by way of annuities.	The whole act.
35 Geo. 3. c. 32	National Debt (No. 3) Act 1795	An Act for granting annuities to satisfy certain navy and victualling bills.	The whole act.
35 Geo. 3. c. 66	National Debt (No. 4) Act 1795	An Act the title of which begins with the words,—An Act for making part of certain perpetual annuities,—and ends with the words,—Bank of England.	The whole act.
35 Geo. 3. c. 128.	National Debt (No. 5) Act 1795	An Act for allowing a further annuity to the subscribers to the sum of eighteen millions, authorized to be raised for the service of the year one thousand seven hundred and ninety-five.	The whole act.
36 Geo. 3. c. 12	National Debt Act 1795	An Act for raising the sum of eighteen millions by way of annuities.	The whole act.
36 Geo. 3. c. 74	National Debt Act 1796	An Act for raising the sum of seven millions five hundred thousand pounds by way of annuities.	The whole act.
36 Geo. 3. c. 122.	National Debt (No. 3) Act 1796	An Act for granting annuities to satisfy certain navy, victualling, and transport bills.	The whole act.
37 Geo. 3. c. 9	National Debt (No. 4) Act 1796	An Act for granting annuities to satisfy certain navy, victualling, transport, and exchequer bills.	The whole act.
37 Geo. 3. c. 10	National Debt (No. 5) Act 1796	An Act for raising the sum of eighteen millions by way of annuities.	The whole act.
37 Geo. 3. c. 20	National Debt (No. 6) Act 1796	An Act for extending the time limited by an Act of this session, for delivering in navy, victualling, transport, and exchequer bills.	The whole act.
37 Geo. 3. c. 46	National Debt Act 1797	An Act the title of which begins with the words,—An Act for making certain annuities created by the Parliament of the Kingdom of Ireland, transferable,—and ends with the words,—Bank of England.	The whole act.
37 Geo. 3. c. 57	National Debt (No. 2) Act 1797	An Act for raising the sum of fourteen millions five hundred thousand pounds by way of annuities.	The whole act.
37 Geo. 3. c. 122.	Forgery Act 1797	An Act the title of which begins with the words,—An Act for the better preventing the forging or counterfeiting the names of witnesses to letters of attorney,—and ends with the words,—stocks or funds.	The whole act.
38 Geo. 3. c. 37	National Debt Act 1798	An Act for raising the sum of seventeen millions by way of annuities.	The whole act.
39 Geo. 3. c. 7	National Debt (No. 3) Act 1798	An Act for raising the sum of three millions by way of annuities.	The whole act.
39 Geo. 3. c. 60	National Debt Act 1799	An Act for raising the sum of fifteen millions five hundred thousand pounds by way of annuities.	The whole act.
39 & 40 Geo. 3. c. 22	National Debt Act 1800	An Act for raising the sum of twenty millions five hundred thousand pounds by way of annuities.	The whole act.
41 Geo. 3. (U.K.) c.3.	National Debt Act 1801	An Act for raising the sum of twenty-eight millions by way of annuity.	The whole act.
42 Geo. 3. c. 8	National Debt Act 1801	An Act for granting annuities to satisfy certain exchequer bills.	The whole act.
42 Geo. 3. c. 33	National Debt Act 1802	An Act for raising the sum of twenty-five millions by way of annuities.	The whole act.
42 Geo. 3. c. 58	National Debt (No. 2) Act 1802	An Act for raising a certain sum of money by way of annuities or debentures, for the service of Ireland.	The whole act.
43 Geo. 3. c. 67	National Debt Act 1803	An Act for raising the sum of twelve millions by way of annuities.	The whole act.
44 Geo. 3. c. 47	National Debt Act 1804	An Act for raising the sum of fourteen millions five hundred thousand pounds by way of annuities.	The whole act.
44 Geo. 3. c. 48	National Debt Act 1804	An Act for raising a certain sum of money by way of annuities or debentures for the service of Ireland.	The whole act.
44 Geo. 3. c. 99	National Debt Act 1804	An Act for granting additional annuities to the proprietors of stock created by two Acts, passed in the thirty-seventh and forty-second years of His present Majesty.	The whole act.
45 Geo. 3. c. 8	National Debt Act 1805	An Act for amending an Act, passed in the last session of Parliament, for granting additional annuities to the proprietors of stock created by two Acts, passed in the thirty-seventh and forty-second years of His present Majesty.	The whole act.
45 Geo. 3. c. 12	National Debt (No. 2) Act 1805	An Act for raising the sum of twenty-two millions five hundred thousand pounds by way of annuities.	The whole act.
45 Geo. 3. c. 40	National Debt (No. 3) Act 1805	An Act for raising the sum of one million five hundred thousand pounds by way of annuities for the service of Ireland.	The whole act.
45 Geo. 3. c. 73	National Debt (No. 4) Act 1805	An Act to enable the Lords Commissioners of His Majesty's Treasury to contract with the proprietors of stock created by two Acts, passed in the thirty-seventh and forty-second years of the present Majesty, for granting other annuities in lieu thereof, or to pay the same off at the period herein mentioned.	The whole act.
46 Geo. 3. c. 33	National Debt Act 1806	An Act for raising the sum of twenty millions by way of annuities.	The whole act.
46 Geo. 3. c. 47	National Debt (No. 2) Act 1806	An Act for raising a certain sum of money by way of annuities or debentures, for the service of Ireland.	The whole act.
46 Geo. 3. c. 55	National Debt (No. 3) Act 1806	An Act to provide for the payment, at the Bank of Ireland, of the interest on certain debentures now payable at the Exchequer of Ireland; and also for altering the days of payment of the interest or dividends on certain annuities in Ireland.	The whole act.
47 Geo. 3 Sess. 1. c. 28	National Debt Act 1807	An Act for raising the sum of fourteen millions two hundred thousand pounds by way of annuities.	The whole act.
47 Geo. 3 Sess. 1. c. 46	National Debt (No. 2) Act 1807	An Act for raising the sum of one million five hundred thousand pounds by way of annuities, for the service of Ireland.	The whole act.
48 Geo. 3. c. 3.	Advance from Bank of England Act 1808	An Act for empowering the governor and company of the Bank of England to advance the sum of three million, towards the supply for the year one thousand eight hundred and eight.	The whole act.
48 Geo. 3. c. 38	National Debt Act 1808	An Act for granting annuities to satisfy certain exchequer bills.	The whole act.
48 Geo. 3. c. 76	National Debt (No. 2) Act 1808	An Act for raising the sum of ten millions five hundred thousand pounds by way of annuities.	The whole act.
48 Geo. 3. c. 83	National Debt (No. 3) Act 1808	An Act for raising the sum of seven hundred and fifty thousand pounds by way of annuities for Ireland.	The whole act.
49 Geo. 3. c. 21	National Debt Act 1809	An Act for granting annuities to discharge certain exchequer bills.	The whole act.
49 Geo. 3. c. 71	National Debt (No. 2) Act 1809	An Act for raising the sum of fourteen millions six hundred thousand pounds by way of annuities.	The whole act.
49 Geo. 3. c. 78	National Debt (No. 3) Act 1809	An Act for raising the sum of one million two hundred and fifty thousand pounds by way of annuities and Treasury bills for the service of Ireland.	The whole act.
50 Geo. 3. c. 23	National Debt Act 1810	An Act for granting annuities to discharge certain exchequer bills.	The whole act.
50 Geo. 3. c. 36	National Debt (No. 2) Act 1810	An Act for granting annuities to discharge an additional number of exchequer bills.	The whole act.
50 Geo. 3. c. 45	National Debt (No. 3) Act 1810	An Act for raising the sum of twelve millions by way of annuities.	The whole act.
50 Geo. 3. c. 68	National Debt (No. 4) Act 1810	An Act for raising the sum of one million four hundred thousand pounds by way of annuities for the service of Ireland.	The whole act.
51 Geo. 3. c. 16	National Debt Act 1811	An Act for granting annuities to discharge certain exchequer bills.	The whole act.
51 Geo. 3. c. 22	National Debt (No. 2) Act 1811	An Act for raising the sum of two millions five hundred thousand pounds, by way of annuities and Treasury bills, for the service of Ireland.	The whole act.
51 Geo. 3. c. 26	National Debt (No. 3) Act 1811	An Act for raising the sum of four millions nine hundred eighty-one thousand three hundred pounds by way of annuities.	The whole act.
51 Geo. 3. c. 35	Advances by Bank of Ireland Act 1811	An Act to secure to the Bank of Ireland the repayment of all monies advanced by them for the purposes and in the manner therein mentioned.	The whole act.
51 Geo. 3. c. 49	National Debt (No. 4) Act 1811	An Act for raising the sum of twelve millions by way of annuities.	The whole act.
52 Geo. 3. c. 14	National Debt Act 1812	An Act for granting annuities to discharge certain exchequer bills.	The whole act.
52 Geo. 3. c. 24	National Debt (No. 2) Act 1812	An Act for raising the sum of six millions seven hundred and eighty-nine thousand six hundred and twenty-five pounds by way of annuities.	The whole act.
52 Geo. 3. c. 70	National Debt (No. 3) Act 1812	An Act for raising the sum of one million five hundred thousand pounds by way of annuities and Treasury bills for the service of Ireland.	The whole act.
52 Geo. 3. c. 85	National Debt (No. 4) Act 1812	An Act for raising the sum of twenty-two millions five hundred thousand pounds by way of annuities.	The whole act.
53 Geo. 3. c. 41	National Debt (No. 2) Act 1813	An Act for granting annuities to satisfy certain exchequer bills; and for raising a sum of money by debentures for the service of Great Britain.	The whole act.
53 Geo. 3. c. 53	National Debt (No. 3) Act 1813	An Act the title of which begins with the words,—An Act for raising a further sum of money by debentures,—and ends with the words,—money by debentures.	The whole act.
53 Geo. 3. c. 61	National Debt (No. 4) Act 1813	An Act for raising the sum of two millions by way of annuities and Treasury bills for the service of Ireland.	The whole act.
53 Geo. 3. c. 69	National Debt (No. 5) Act 1813	An Act for raising the sum of twenty-seven millions by way of annuities.	The whole act.
53 Geo. 3. c. 95	National Debt Reduction Act 1813	An Act to provide for the charge of the addition to the public funded debt of Great Britain, in the year one thousand eight hundred and thirteen.	The whole act.
54 Geo. 3. c. 3.	National Debt (No. 6) Act 1813	An Act for raising the sum of twenty-two millions by way of annuities.	The whole act.
54 Geo. 3. c. 8	National Debt Reduction (No. 2) Act 1813	An Act to provide for the charge of the addition to the public funded debt of Great Britain for the service of the year one thousand eight hundred and fourteen.	The whole act.
54 Geo. 3. c. 76	National Debt Act 1814	An Act for raising the sum of twenty-four millions by way of annuities.	The whole act.
54 Geo. 3. c. 85	National Debt (No. 2) Act 1814	An Act for raising the sum of three millions by way of annuities for the service of Ireland.	The whole act.
54 Geo. 3. c. 89	National Debt Reduction Act 1814	An Act for the charge of the further addition to the public funded debt of Great Britain, for the service of the year one thousand eight hundred and fourteen.	The whole act.
54 Geo. 3. c. 139.	National Debt (No. 3) Act 1814	An Act to rectify a mistake in an Act of this session of Parliament, for raising the sum of twenty-four millions by way of annuities.	The whole act.
54 Geo. 3. c. 140.	National Debt (No. 4) Act 1814	An Act to repeal several Acts of the Parliament of Ireland for granting certain annuities.	The whole act.
55 Geo. 3. c. 2	National Debt (No. 5) Act 1814	An Act for directing the application of the residuary personal estate of Anna Maria Reynolds, spinster, bequeathed by her to the use of the sinking fund.	The whole act.
55 Geo. 3. c. 16	Loan from Bank of England Act 1815	An Act the title of which begins with the words,—An Act to continue and amend an Act,—and ends with the words,—service of the year one thousand eight hundred and eight.	The whole act.
55 Geo. 3. c. 58	National Debt Act 1815	An Act for granting annuities to discharge certain exchequer bills.	The whole act.
55 Geo. 3. c. 74	National Debt (No. 2) Act 1815	An Act for granting annuities to discharge certain exchequer bills; and for raising a sum of money by annuities, for the service of Great Britain.	The whole act.
55 Geo. 3. c. 124.	National Debt (No. 3) Act 1815	An Act for raising the sum of thirty-six millions by way of annuities.	The whole act.
56 Geo. 3. c. 7	Advance by Bank of England Act 1816	An Act the title of which begins with the words,—An Act to continue,—and ends with the words,—service of the year one thousand eight hundred and eight.	The whole act.
56 Geo. 3. c. 60	National Debt Reduction Act 1816	An Act the title of which begins with the words,—An Act to authorise the transferring stock,—and ends with the words,—reduction of the National Debt.	The whole act.
56 Geo. 3. c. 89	National Debt Reduction (No. 2) Act 1816	An Act to provide for the charge of certain additions to the public debt of Ireland, for the service of the year one thousand eight hundred and sixteen.	The whole act.
57 Geo. 3. c. 82	National Debt Act 1817	An Act to continue an Act passed in Ireland in the thirteenth and fourteenth years of His present Majesty respecting certain annuities, so long as the said annuities shall be payable.	The whole act.
57 Geo. 3. c. 83	National Debt (No. 2) Act 1817	An Act to amend an Act, made in the last session of Parliament, for providing for the charge of certain additions to the public debt of Ireland.	The whole act.
58 Geo. 3. c. 23	National Debt Act 1818	An Act for raising the sum of three millions, by the transfer of certain three pounds per centum annuities into other annuities, at the rate of three pounds ten shillings per centum; and for granting annuities to discharge certain exchequer bills.	The whole act.
59 Geo. 3. c. 42	National Debt Act 1819	An Act for raising the sum of twelve millions by way of annuities.	The whole act.
1 Geo. 4. c. 13	National Debt Act 1820	An Act for funding exchequer bills to a certain amount, and for raising a sum of money by way of annuities, for the service of the year one thousand eight hundred and twenty.	The whole act.
1 Geo. 4. c. 17	National Debt (No. 2) Act 1820	An Act for raising the sum of five millions by way of annuities.	The whole act.
1 Geo. 4. c. 23	National Debt (No. 4) Act 1820	An Act to provide for the charge of the addition to the public funded debt of Great Britain, for the service of the year one thousand eight hundred and twenty.	The whole act.
1 & 2 Geo. 4. c. 26	Bank of England Act 1821	An Act for making further provision for the gradual resumption of payments in cash by the Bank of England.	The whole act.
1 & 2 Geo. 4. c. 27	Bank of Ireland (No. 1) Act 1821	An Act for making further provision for the gradual resumption of payments in cash by the Bank of Ireland.	The whole act.
1 & 2 Geo. 4. c. 73	Transfer of Public Funds Act 1821	An Act to permit, for three years, the transfer from certain public stocks or funds in Ireland, to certain stocks or funds in Great Britain.	The whole act.
1 & 2 Geo. 4. c. 108	National Debt (No. 2) Act 1821	An Act to provide for the charge of the addition to the public funded debt of the United Kingdom of Great Britain and Ireland, for the service of the year one thousand eight hundred and twenty-one.	The whole act.
3 Geo. 4. c. 9	Reduction of National Debt Act 1822	An Act for transferring several annuities of five pounds per centum per annum into annuities of four pounds per centum per annum.	The whole act.
3 Geo. 4. c. 17	National Debt Act 1822	An Act for converting annuities and debentures of five pounds per centum per annum, payable at the Bank of Ireland, into new annuities of four pounds per centum per annum.	The whole act.
3 Geo. 4. c. 26	Advances by Bank of Ireland Act 1822	An Act the title of which begins with the words,—An Act to reduce the rate of interest,—and ends with the words,—forty-eighth year of His late Majesty.	The whole act.
3 Geo. 4. c. 61	National Debt (No. 2) Act 1822	An Act the title of which begins with the words,—An Act to regulate the performance of certain contracts,—and ends with the words,—annuities in lieu thereof.	The whole act.
3 Geo. 4. c. 66	National Debt (No. 3) Act 1822	An Act the title of which begins with the words,—An Act for authorising the Commissioners for the Reduction of the National Debt,—and ends with the words,—annuities in lieu thereof.	The whole act.
3 Geo. 4. c. 68	National Debt (No. 4) Act 1822	An Act to provide for the charge of the addition to the public funded debt of Great Britain and Ireland, for defraying the expense of military and naval pensions and civil superannuations.	The whole act.
3 Geo. 4. c. 89	National Debt (No. 6) Act 1822	An Act to provide for the charge of the addition to the public funded debt of Great Britain, for the service of the year one thousand eight hundred and twenty-two.	The whole act.
3 Geo. 4. c. 93	National Debt (No. 7) Act 1822	An Act for carrying into execution an agreement between His Majesty and the East India Company.	The whole act.
4 Geo. 4. c. 22	Dead-weight Annuity Act 1823	An Act the title of which begins with the words,—An Act to confirm an agreement,—and ends with the words,—Bank of England.	The whole act.
5 Geo. 4. c. 9	National Debt Act 1824	An Act to carry into effect a convention relating to Austrian loans.	The whole act.
5 Geo. 4. c. 11	National Debt (No. 2) Act 1824	An Act for transferring several annuities of four pounds per centum per annum into annuities of three pounds ten shillings per centum per annum.	The whole act.
5 Geo. 4. c. 24	National Debt (No. 3) Act 1824	An Act for transferring several annuities of four pounds per centum per annum, transferable at the Bank of Ireland, into reduced annuities of three pounds ten shillings per centum per annum.	The whole act.
5 Geo. 4. c. 45	National Debt (No. 4) Act 1824	An Act the title of which begins with the words,—An Act to authorise the issuing of exchequer bills,—and ends with the words,—reduced annuities of three pounds ten shillings per centum.	The whole act.
5 Geo. 4. c. 53	National Debt (No. 5) Act 1824	An Act to permit the mutual transfer of capital in certain public stocks or funds transferable at the Banks of England and Ireland respectively.	The whole act.
7 Geo. 4. c. 39	National Debt Act 1826	An Act for funding eight millions of exchequer bills.	The whole act.
10 Geo. 4. c. 31	National Debt (No. 2) Act 1829	An Act for funding three millions of exchequer bills.	The whole act.
11 Geo. 4. & 1 Will. 4. c. 13	National Debt Act 1830	An Act for transferring certain annuities of four pounds per centum per annum into annuities of three pounds and ten shillings or five pounds per centum per annum.	The whole act.
4 & 5 Will. 4. c. 31	National Debt Act 1834	An Act for transferring certain annuities of four pounds per centum per annum into annuities of three pounds and ten shillings per centum per annum, and for providing for paying off the persons who may dissent to such transfer.	The whole act.
4 & 5 Will. 4. c. 80	National Debt (No. 2) Act 1834	An Act to provide for the repayment to the governor and company of the Bank of England of one fourth part of the debt due from the public to the said company, in pursuance of an Act passed in the last session of Parliament.	The whole act.
7 Will. 4 & 1 Vict. c. 59	Bank of Ireland Advances Act 1837	An Act to postpone until the first day of January one thousand eight hundred and thirty-nine the repayment of certain sums advanced by the Bank of Ireland for the public service.	The whole act.
1 & 2 Vict. c. 81	Bank of Ireland Advances Act 1838	An Act further to postpone until the first day of January one thousand eight hundred and forty the repayment of certain sums advanced by the Bank of Ireland for the public service.	The whole act.
2 & 3 Vict. c. 97	National Debt Act 1839	An Act for funding exchequer bills.	The whole act.
3 & 4 Vict. c. 75	National Debt Act 1840	An Act to regulate the repayment of certain sums advanced by the governor and company of the Bank of Ireland for the public service.	The whole act.
5 Vict. c. 8	National Debt Act 1841	An Act for funding exchequer bills, and for making provision for the service of the year one thousand eight hundred and forty-one.	The whole act.
7 & 8 Vict. c. 4	National Debt Act 1844	An Act for transferring three pounds ten shillings per centum per annum annuities one thousand eight hundred and eighteen into annuities of three pounds five shillings per centum per annum and new three pounds per centum per annum annuities.	The whole act.
7 & 8 Vict. c. 5	National Debt (No. 2) Act 1844	An Act for transferring certain annuities of three pounds ten shillings per centum per annum and government debentures into annuities of three pounds five shillings per centum per annum and new three pounds per centum per annum annuities.	The whole act.
7 & 8 Vict. c. 39	Income Tax Act 1844	An Act to exempt from the payment of property tax the dividends on certain annuities created by two Acts of the present session, payable for the quarter of the year ending the tenth day of October one thousand eight hundred and forty-four.	The whole act.
7 & 8 Vict. c. 64	National Debt (No. 3) Act 1844	An Act to provide for paying off such of the three pounds ten shillings per centum annuities and government debentures which are to be paid off under two Acts passed in the present session of Parliament.	The whole act.
7 & 8 Vict. c. 80	South Sea Company Act 1844	An Act the title of which begins with the words,—An Act for completing the guarantee fund of the South Sea Company,—and ends with the words,—South Sea stock and annuities.	The whole act.
8 & 9 Vict. c. 62	National Debt Act 1845	An Act to make further provisions as to stock and dividends unclaimed.	The whole act.
8 & 9 Vict. c. 97	Public Funds Act 1845	An Act to amend the law respecting testamentary dispositions of property in the public funds, and to authorise the payment of dividends on letters of attorney in certain cases.	The whole act.
9 & 10 Vict. c. 8	National Debt Act 1846	An Act to make further provisions as to unclaimed stock and dividends of the South Sea Company.	The whole act.
10 & 11 Vict. c. 9	National Debt Act 1847	An Act for raising the sum of eight millions by way of annuities.	The whole act.
11 & 12 Vict. c. 125	National Debt Act 1848	An Act for raising the sum of two millions by exchequer bills, or by the creation of annuities, for the service of the year one thousand eight hundred and forty-eight.	The whole act.
16 & 17 Vict. c. 23	National Debt Act 1853	An Act the title of which begins with the words,—An Act for redeeming or commuting the annuity,—and ends with the words,—and issuing exchequer bonds.	The whole act.
16 & 17 Vict. c. 132	National Debt (No. 2) Act 1853	An Act the title of which begins with the words,—An Act to extend the provisions of an Act,—and ends with the words,—payments to be made under the said Act.	The whole act.
18 & 19 Vict. c. 18	National Debt Act 1855	An Act for raising the sum of sixteen millions by way of annuities.	The whole act.
19 & 20 Vict. c. 5	National Debt Act 1856	An Act for funding exchequer bills and raising money by way of annuities.	The whole act.
19 & 20 Vict. c. 6	National Debt (No. 2) Act 1856	An Act for raising five millions by way of annuities.	The whole act.
19 & 20 Vict. c. 21	National Debt (No. 3) Act 1856	An Act for raising the further sum of five millions by way of annuities.	The whole act.
21 & 22 Vict. c. 1	Bank Issues Indemnity Act 1857	An Act to indemnify the governor and company of the Bank of England in respect of certain issues of their notes, and to confirm such issues, and to authorize further issues for a time to be limited.	The whole act.
23 & 24 Vict. c. 71	Reduction of the National Debt Act 1860	An Act to make provision as to certain unclaimed dividends in Ireland.	The whole act.
24 & 25 Vict. c. 3	Bank of England Act 1861	An Act to make further provision respecting certain payments to and from the Bank of England, and to increase the facilities for the transfer of stocks and annuities, and for other purposes — Sections one, seven, and eight.	The whole act.
24 & 25 Vict. c. 35	National Debt Act 1861	An Act the title of which begins with the words,—An Act to increase the facilities for the transfer of stocks,—and ends with the words,—and for other purposes.	The whole act.
25 & 26 Vict. c. 21	Bank of Ireland, Transfer of Stocks Act 1862	An Act to amend the law relating to the transfer of stocks and annuities transferable at the Bank of Ireland.	The whole act.
26 & 27 Vict. c. 28	Stock Certificate Act 1863	Stock Certificate Act, 1863.	The whole act.
26 & 27 Vict. c. 33	Revenue Act 1863	An Act for granting to Her Majesty certain duties of inland revenue; and to amend the laws relating to the inland revenue — Section twenty-four.	The whole act.
29 & 30 Vict. c. 11	National Debt Reduction Act 1866	The National Debt Reduction Act, 1866.	Section two
32 & 33 Vict. c. 104	Dividends and Stock Act 1869	The Dividends and Stock Act, 1869.	The whole act.
33 & 34 Vict. c. 47	Dividends and Stock Act 1870	The Dividends and Stock Act, 1870.	Except as to any payment on 5th January 1871 in respect of dividend.

== See also ==
- Statute Law Revision Act
