= National Debt Act 1870 =

Act of the Parliament of the United Kingdom

National Debt Act 1870 (Note: Section 1.)
- Act of Parliament
- Parliament of the United Kingdom
- Long title: An Act for consolidating, with Amendments, certain Enactments relating to the National Debt.
- Citation: 33 & 34 Vict. c. 71
- Territorial extent: United Kingdom

Dates
- Royal assent: 9 August 1870
- Commencement: 9 August 1870 (Note: The Acts of Parliament (Commencement) Act 1793.)

Other legislation
- Amended by: Statute Law Revision Act 1883; National Debt Act 1889; Bank Act 1892; Statute Law Revision (No. 2) Act 1893; Trusts (Scotland) Act 1921; Government Annuities Act 1929; Finance Act 1937; Finance Act 1942; Bank of England Act 1946; Finance Act 1949; Statute Law Revision Act 1950; Miscellaneous Financial Provisions Act 1955; Statute Law Revision Act 1960; Finance Act 1963; Statute Law Revision Act 1963; Statute Law Revision Act 1966; National Loans Act 1968; Statute Law (Repeals) Act 1986; Statute Law (Repeals) Act 1993; Bank of England Act 1998; Uncertificated Securities Regulations 2001; Irish Registers of Government Stock (Closure and Transfer) Order 2002; Government Stock (Consequential and Transitional Provision) (No. 2) Order 2004; Government Stock (Consequential and Transitional Provision) (No.3) Order 2004
- Relates to: Forgery Act 1870; Statute Law Revision Act 1870

Status: Partially repealed

Text of statute as originally enacted

Revised text of statute as amended

Text of the National Debt Act 1870 as in force today (including any amendments) within the United Kingdom, from legislation.gov.uk.

The National Debt Act 1870 (33 & 34 Vict. c. 71) is an act of the Parliament of the United Kingdom that consolidated enactments related to the national debt of the United Kingdom.

The enactments consolidated by this act and the Forgery Act 1870 (33 & 34 Vict. c. 58) were repealed by section 1 of, and the schedule to, the Statute Law Revision Act 1870 (c. 69).

As of 2026, the act remains partly in force in the United Kingdom.

== Subsequent developments ==
The following enactments were repealed by section 1(1) of, and the first schedule to, the Statute Law Revision Act 1950 (14 Geo. 6. c. 6), which came into force on 23 May 1950.

- Section 5 to " the respective amounts thereof subsisting at the passing of this Act, and "; the words " due to the several persons who at the passing of this Act are entitled thereto, and their representatives "; the words from " All the annuities " in the first place in which those words occur, to " therein mentioned "; and the words " at the periods and in the manner in the same Schedule mentioned ".
- Sections 7, 8, 9, 10, 17 and 19.
- Section 27 to " annuities. But "; and the words " other " and " also ". Section thirty-two the words " or some person deriving title from him by devolution in law as in this part of this Act mentioned " and the words " and on his bankruptcy his assignee, and on the marriage of the nominee being a female, her husband ".
- Section 37.
- Section 39 paragraph five, the words " or bankruptcy " and the words " or of the marriage of the nominee being a female ".
- Section 69.
- Section 73 the words " receipt of dividends and "; and the words " and to receipt of dividends on stock standing in the names of infants or persons of unsound mind ".
- Schedule one, all the denominations except the last; the second and third columns; the regulation.
- Schedule three.

Section 70 of the act was repealed by section 1 of, and the schedule to, the Statute Law Revision Act 1963, which came into force on 31 July 1963.

Section 2 and 4, parts IV and V, and section 73 of, and schedule 2 to, the act were repealed by section 1(1) of, and part III of schedule 1 to, the Statute Law (Repeals) Act 1986, which came into force on 2 May 1986.

Section 74 of the act was repealed by section 1(1) of, and group 1 of part IX of schedule 1 to, the Statute Law (Repeals) Act 1993, which came into force on 5 November 1993.
