= Land Tax Certificates Forgery Act 1812 =

Act of the Parliament of the United Kingdom

Land Tax Certificates Forgery Act 1812 (Note: The citation of this act by this short title was authorised by section 1 of, and the first schedule to, the Short Titles Act 1896. Due to the repeal of those provisions it is now authorised by section 19(2) of the Interpretation Act 1978.)
- Act of Parliament
- Parliament of the United Kingdom
- Long title: An Act for amending and reducing into one Act, the Provisions contained in any Laws now in force imposing the Penalty of Death for any Act done in Breach of or in Resistance to any Part of the Laws for collecting His Majesty's Revenue in Great Britain.
- Citation: 52 Geo. 3. c. 143
- Territorial extent: United Kingdom

Dates
- Royal assent: 23 July 1812
- Commencement: 23 July 1812 (Note: The Acts of Parliament (Commencement) Act 1793.)
- Repealed: England and Wales and Ireland: 1 January 1914; ]Scotland: 10 March 1966
Other legislation
Repealed by	England and Wales and Ireland: Forgery Act 1913; Scotland: Statute Law Revision Act 1966

Status: Repealed

Text of statute as originally enacted

The Land Tax Certificates Forgery Act 1812 (52 Geo. 3. c. 143) was an act of the Parliament of the United Kingdom that consolidated and amended enactments imposing the penalty of death for acts done in breach of or in resistance to the laws for collecting revenue in Great Britain.

== Provisions ==
Section 1 of the act provided that all offences previously punishable as felony without benefit of clergy under the laws for collecting revenue in Great Britain would thereafter be treated as felony with benefit of clergy, and punishable only as such, unless the same offence was also declared by the act itself to be felony without benefit of clergy.

The act then re-enacted the death penalty, as felony without benefit of clergy, for specified serious offences against the revenue laws, including resisting or obstructing revenue officers in the execution of their duties, shooting at or wounding revenue officers, destroying or damaging vessels or equipment used in revenue collection, and the forcible rescue of seized goods. Section 6 of the act specifically made it felony without benefit of clergy to forge, counterfeit, or utter knowing them to be forged any certificate issued under any act for granting land tax, providing the source of the act's short title. Sections 11 and 12 of the act extended its provisions to offences committed anywhere in England, Scotland or Ireland, including offences committed at sea within the limits of any port, harbour or creek of the United Kingdom.

== Subsequent developments ==
The whole act was repealed for England and Wales and Ireland by section 20 of, and part I of the schedule to, the Forgery Act 1913 (3 & 4 Geo. 5. c. 27), which came into force on 1 January 1914.

The whole act was repealed for Scotland by section 1 of, and the schedule to, the Statute Law Revision Act 1966, which came into force on 10 March 1966.
