= List of acts of the Parliament of Great Britain from 1714 =

This is a complete list of acts of the Parliament of Great Britain for the year 1714.

For acts passed until 1707, see the list of acts of the Parliament of England and the list of acts of the Parliament of Scotland. See also the list of acts of the Parliament of Ireland.

For acts passed from 1801 onwards, see the list of acts of the Parliament of the United Kingdom. For acts of the devolved parliaments and assemblies in the United Kingdom, see the list of acts of the Scottish Parliament, the list of acts of the Northern Ireland Assembly, and the list of acts and measures of Senedd Cymru; see also the list of acts of the Parliament of Northern Ireland.

The number shown after each act's title is its chapter number. Acts are cited using this number, preceded by the year(s) of the reign during which the relevant parliamentary session was held; thus the Union with Ireland Act 1800 is cited as "39 & 40 Geo. 3. c. 67", meaning the 67th act passed during the session that started in the 39th year of the reign of George III and which finished in the 40th year of that reign. Note that the modern convention is to use Arabic numerals in citations (thus "41 Geo. 3" rather than "41 Geo. III"). Acts of the last session of the Parliament of Great Britain and the first session of the Parliament of the United Kingdom are both cited as "41 Geo. 3".

Acts passed by the Parliament of Great Britain did not have a short title; however, some of these acts have subsequently been given a short title by acts of the Parliament of the United Kingdom (such as the Short Titles Act 1896).

Before the Acts of Parliament (Commencement) Act 1793 came into force on 8 April 1793, acts passed by the Parliament of Great Britain were deemed to have come into effect on the first day of the session in which they were passed. Because of this, the years given in the list below may in fact be the year before a particular act was passed.

== 1 Geo. 1. St. 1 ==
The second session of the 4th Parliament of Great Britain, which met from 1 August 1714 until 25 August 1714.

There were no private acts in this session.

This session was also traditionally cited as 1 Geo. 1, 1 Geo. 1. st. 1, 1 Geo. 1. Stat. 1, 1 Geo. 1. stat. 1, 1 G. 1, 1 G. 1. St. 1, 1 G. 1. st. 1, 1 G. 1. Stat. 1 or 1 G. 1. stat. 1.

=== Public acts ===
Short title	Citation	Royal assent
Long title
Civil List Act 1714 (repealed)	1 Geo. 1. St. 1. c. 1	21 August 1714
An Act for the better support of his Majesty's houshold and of the honour and dignity of the crown of Great Britain. (Repealed by Statute Law Revision Act 1867 (30 & 31 Vict. c. 59))
National Debt Act 1714 (repealed)	1 Geo. 1. St. 1. c. 2	21 August 1714
An Act for rectifying mistakes in the names of the commissioners for the land-tax for the year one thousand seven hundred and fourteen; and for raising so much as is wanting to make up the sum of fourteen hundred thousand pounds, intended to be raised by a lottery for the publick service in the said year. (Repealed by Statute Law Revision Act 1870 (33 & 34 Vict. c. 69))
Oaths, etc. Act 1714 (repealed)	1 Geo. 1. St. 1. c. 3	21 August 1714
An Act to enable persons now residing in Great Britain, to take the oaths, and do all other acts in Great Britain, requisite to qualify themselves to continue their respective places, offices and employments in Ireland. (Repealed by Statute Law Revision Act 1867 (30 & 31 Vict. c. 59))

=== Sources ===
- Pickering, Danby, ed. (1764). "Anno primo Georgii I. Stat. 1". The Statutes at Large. Vol. 13: From the Twelfth Year of Queen Anne to the Fifth Year of King George I. Cambridge: Joseph Bentham. pp. 130–137 – via Internet Archive.
- Pickering, Danby, ed. (1764). "Anno primo Georgii I. Stat. 1". The Statutes at Large. Vol. 13: From the Twelfth Year of Queen Anne to the Fifth Year of King George I. Cambridge: Joseph Bentham. pp. 130–137 – via Google Books.
- Pickering, Danby, ed. (1764). "Anno primo Georgii I. Stat. 1". The Statutes at Large. Vol. 13: From the Twelfth Year of Queen Anne to the Fifth Year of King George I. Cambridge: Joseph Bentham. pp. 130–137 – via Internet Archive.
- Pickering, Danby, ed. (1764). "Anno primo Georgii I. Stat. 1". The Statutes at Large. Vol. 13: From the Twelfth Year of Queen Anne to the Fifth Year of King George I. Cambridge, Printed by J. Bentham. pp. 130–137 – via Internet Archive.
- Pickering, Danby, ed. (1764). "Anno primo Georgii I. Stat. 1". The Statutes at Large. Vol. 13: From the Twelfth Year of Queen Anne to the Fifth Year of King George I. Cambridge: Joseph Bentham. pp. 130–137 – via Google Books.
- Journals of the House of Commons. Vol. 18. London: His Majesty's Stationery Office. 1803. pp. 3–12 – via Google Books.
- Chronological Table of and Index to the Statutes. Vol. 1: To the End of the Session 59 Vict. Sess. 2 (1895) (13th ed.). London: Her Majesty's Stationery Office. 1896. p. 92 – via Google Books.
- "Acts of the Parliament of Great Britain from 1714". legislation.gov.uk. The National Archives.

== 1 Geo. 1. St. 2 ==
The first session of the 5th Parliament of Great Britain, which met from 17 March 1715 until 26 June 1716.

This session was also traditionally cited as 1 Geo. 1. st. 2, 1 Geo. 1. Stat. 2, 1 Geo. 1. stat. 2, 1 G. 1. St. 2, 1 G. 1. st. 2, 1 G. 1. Stat. 2 or 1 G. 1. stat. 2.

=== Public acts ===
Short title	Citation	Royal assent
Long title
Land Tax Act 1714 (repealed)	1 Geo. 1. St. 2. c. 1	11 May 1715
An act for granting an aid to his Majesty, to be raised by a land-tax in Great-Britain, for the service of the year one thousand seven hundred and fifteen. (Repealed by Statute Law Revision Act 1867 (30 & 31 Vict. c. 59))
Malt Duties, etc. Act 1714 (repealed)	1 Geo. 1. St. 2. c. 2	3 June 1715
An Act for charging and continuing the duties on malt, mum, cyder and perry, for the service of the year one thousand seven hundred and fifteen; and for making forth duplicates of Exchequer-bills, and lottery-tickets, lost, burnt, or destroyed; and for enlarging the time for adjusting claims in several lotteries; and for making forth new orders in lieu of certain lottery-orders obliterated or defective; and for continuing certain duties on hops, until the first day of August one thousand seven hundred and fifteen. (Repealed by Inland Revenue Act 1880 (43 & 44 Vict. c. 20))
Mutiny Act 1714 (repealed)	1 Geo. 1. St. 2. c. 3	3 June 1715
An act for the better regulating the forces to be continued in his Majesty's service, and for the payment of the said forces, and of their quarters. (Repealed by Statute Law Revision Act 1867 (30 & 31 Vict. c. 59))
Naturalization Act 1714 (repealed)	1 Geo. 1. St. 2. c. 4	20 July 1715
An act to explain the act made in the twelfth year of the reign of King William the Third, intituled, "An act for the further limitation of the crown, and better securing the rights and liberties of the subject." (Note: Act of Settlement 1700 (12 & 13 Will. 3. c. 2)) (Repealed by Statute Law Revision Act 1867 (30 & 31 Vict. c. 59))
Riot Act or the Riot Act 1714 or the Riot Act 1715 (repealed)	1 Geo. 1. St. 2. c. 5	20 July 1715
An Act for preventing tumults and riotous assemblies, and for the more speedy and effectual punishing the rioters. (Repealed for England and Wales by Criminal Law Act 1967 (c. 58) and for Scotland by Statute Law (Repeals) Act 1973 (c. 39))
Tithes and Church Rates Recovery Act 1714 (repealed)	1 Geo. 1. St. 2. c. 6	20 July 1715
An Act for making perpetual an act of the seventh and eighth years of the reign of his late majesty King William the Third, intituled, "An act that the solemn affirmation and declaration of the people called Quakers, shall be accepted instead of an oath in the usual form;" (Note: Quakers Act 1695 (7 & 8 Will. 3. c. 34)) and for explaining and enforcing the said act in relation to the payment of tithes and church rates; and for appointing the form of an affirmation to be taken by the said people called Quakers, instead of the oath of abjuration. (Repealed by Promissory Oaths Act 1871 (34 & 35 Vict. c. 48), Statute Law Revision Act 1887 (50 & 51 Vict. c. 59) and Statute Law (Repeals) Act 1969 (c. 52))
Imprisonment of Certain Traitors Act 1714 (repealed)	1 Geo. 1. St. 2. c. 7	20 July 1715
An Act for continuing the imprisonment of Robert Blackburn and others, for the horrid conspiracy to assassinate the person of his late sacred Majesty King William the Third. (Repealed by Statute Law Revision Act 1867 (30 & 31 Vict. c. 59))
Habeas Corpus Suspension, etc. Act 1714 (repealed)	1 Geo. 1. St. 2. c. 8	23 July 1715
An Act to impower his Majesty to secure and detain such persons as his Majesty shall suspect are conspiring against his person and government. (Repealed by Statute Law Revision Act 1867 (30 & 31 Vict. c. 59))
Mutiny (No. 2) Act 1714 (repealed)	1 Geo. 1. St. 2. c. 9	2 August 1715
An Act for the better preventing Mutiny and Desertion, by enforcing and making more effectual an Act of this present Parliament, intituled, "An Act for the better regulating the Forces to be continued in His Majesty's Service; and for the Payment of the said Forces and their Quarters." (Note: Mutiny Act 1714 (1 Geo. 1. St. 2. c. 3)) (Repealed by Statute Law Revision Act 1867 (30 & 31 Vict. c. 59))
Queen Anne's Bounty Act 1714 (repealed)	1 Geo. 1. St. 2. c. 10	2 August 1715
An Act for making more effectual her late Majesty's gracious intentions for augmenting the maintenance of the poor clergy. (Repealed by First Fruits and Tenths Measure 1926 (No. 5), Patronage (Benefices) Measure 1986 (No. 3) and Statute Law (Repeals) Measure 2018 (No. 1))
Highways Act 1714 or the Carriages (Restriction of Horses) Act 1714 (repealed)	1 Geo. 1. St. 2. c. 11	2 August 1715
An Act to refrain all waggoners, carriers, and others, for drawing any carriage with more than five horses in length. (Repealed by Highways (No. 2) Act 1766 (7 Geo. 3. c. 42))
National Debt (No. 2) Act 1714 (repealed)	1 Geo. 1. St. 2. c. 12	20 August 1715
An act for enlarging the fund of the governor and company of the bank of England, relating to Exchequer bills; and for settling an additional revenue of one hundred and twenty thousand pounds per annum upon his Majesty during his life, for the service of the civil government; and for establishing a certain fund of fifty four thousand six hundred pounds per annum, in order to raise a sum not exceeding nine hundred and ten thousand pounds for the service of the publick, by sale of annuities, after the rate of six pounds per centum per annum, redeemable by parliament; and for satisfying an arrear for work and materials at Blenheim, incurred whilst that building was carried on at the expence of her late majesty Queen Anne, of blessed memory; and for other purposes therein mentioned. (Repealed by Statute Law Revision Act 1870 (33 & 34 Vict. c. 69))
Security of the Sovereign Act 1714 (repealed)	1 Geo. 1. St. 2. c. 13	20 August 1715
An Act for the further security of His Majesty's person and government, and the succession of the Crown in the heirs of the late Princess Sophia being Protestants, and for extinguishing the hopes of the pretended Prince of Wales, and his open and secret abettors. (Repealed for Great Britain by Promissory Oaths Act 1871 (34 & 35 Vict. c. 48) (Note: Incorrectly cited as "Promissory Oaths, 1872 c 48" in the Chronological Table of the Statutes.) and for the Isle of Man by Statute Law Revision (Isle of Man) Act 1991 (c. 61))
Militia Act 1714 (repealed)	1 Geo. 1. St. 2. c. 14	20 August 1715
An Act for making the Militia of that Part of Great Britain called England more useful; and for obliging an Annual Accompt to be taken of Trophy-money. (Repealed by Statute Law Revision Act 1867 (30 & 31 Vict. c. 59))
Woollen Manufacture Act 1714 (repealed)	1 Geo. 1. St. 2. c. 15	20 August 1715
An Act to make an Act of the Tenth Year of Her late Majesty, intituled, "An Act for regulating, improving, and encouraging the Woollen Manufacture of mixed or medley Broad Cloth, and for the better Payment of the Poor employed therein," (Note: Woollen Manufacture Act 1711 (10 Ann. c. 26)) more effectual for the Benefit of Trade in general; and also to render more effectual an Act of the Seventh Year of Her said Majesty's Reign, intituled, "An Act for the better ascertaining the Lengths and Breadths of Woollen Cloth made in the County of York." (Note: Woollen Cloth Act 1708 (7 Ann. c. 13)) (Repealed by Woollen Manufacture Act 1809 (49 Geo. 3. c. 109))
Attainder of Viscount Bolingbroke Act 1714 (repealed)	1 Geo. 1. St. 2. c. 16	20 August 1715
An act for the attainder of Henry viscount Bolingbroke of high treason, unless he shall render himself to justice by a day certain therein mentioned. (Repealed by Statute Law (Repeals) Act 1977 (c. 18))
Attainder of Duke of Ormonde Act 1714 (repealed)	1 Geo. 1. St. 2. c. 17	20 August 1715
An act for the attainder of James Duke Ormonde of high treason, unless he shall render himself to justice by a day certain therein mentioned. (Repealed by Statute Law (Repeals) Act 1977 (c. 18))
Fish Act 1714 (repealed)	1 Geo. 1. St. 2. c. 18	20 August 1715
An act for the better preventing fresh fish taken by foreigners being imported into this kingdom, and for the preservation of the fry of fish; and for the giving leave to import lobsters and turbets in foreign bottoms, and for the better preservation of salmon within several rivers in that part of this kingdom called England. (Repealed by Sea Fisheries Act 1868 (31 & 32 Vict. c. 45))
National Debt (No. 3) Act 1714 (repealed)	1 Geo. 1. St. 2. c. 19	30 August 1715
An Act for raising Nine Hundred and Ten Thousand Pounds, for public Services, by Sale of Annuities after the Rate of Five Pounds per Centum per Annum, redeemable by Parliament; and to authorize a Treaty concerning private Rights, claimed by the Proprietors of the Sugar-houses in Scotland. (Repealed by Statute Law Revision Act 1870 (33 & 34 Vict. c. 69))
Treason in Scotland Act 1714 (repealed)	1 Geo. 1. St. 2. c. 20	30 August 1715
An Act for encouraging all Superiors, Vassals, Landlords, and Tenants, in Scotland, who do and shall continue in their Duty and Loyalty to His Majesty King George; and for discouraging all Superiors, Vassals, Landlords, and Tenants there, who have been, or shall be, guilty of rebellious Practices against His said Majesty; and for making void all fraudulent Entails, Tailzies, and Conveyances, made there, for barring or excluding the Effect of Forfeitures that may have been, or shall be, incurred there, on any such Account; as also for calling any suspected Person or Persons, whose Estate or principal Residence is in Scotland, to appear at Edinburgh, or where it shall be judged expedient, to find Bail for their good Behaviour; and for the better disarming disaffected Persons in Scotland. (Repealed by Promissory Oaths Act 1871 (34 & 35 Vict. c. 48))
National Debt (No. 4) Act 1714 (repealed)	1 Geo. 1. St. 2. c. 21	21 September 1715
An Act for enlarging the Capital Stock and Yearly Fund of the South Sea Company; and for supplying thereby Eight Hundred Twenty-two Thousand Thirty-two Pounds, Four Shillings, and Eight Pence, to public Uses; and for raising One Hundred Sixty-nine Thousand Pounds, for the like Uses, by Sale of Annuities, upon divers Encouragements therein mentioned; and for appropriating several Supplies granted to His Majesty. (Repealed by Statute Law Revision Act 1870 (33 & 34 Vict. c. 69))
Provision for Princess of Wales Act 1714 (repealed)	1 Geo. 1. St. 2. c. 22	21 September 1715
An Act to enable His Majesty to settle a Revenue, for supporting the Dignity of her Royal Highness the Princess, in case she shall survive his Royal Highness the Prince of Wales. (Repealed by Statute Law Revision Act 1867 (30 & 31 Vict. c. 59))
Building of Churches, London and Westminster Act 1714 (repealed)	1 Geo. 1. St. 2. c. 23	21 September 1715
An Act for making Provision for the Ministers of the Fifty new Churches, which are to be built in and about the Cities of London and Westminster, and Suburbs thereof; and for re-building and finishing the Parish Church of St. Mary Woolnoth, in the said City of London. (Repealed by London Coal Duties Abolition Act 1889 (52 & 53 Vict. c. 17) and Statute Law (Repeals) Act 2013 (c. 2))
Debts Due to the Army Act 1714 (repealed)	1 Geo. 1. St. 2. c. 24	21 September 1715
An Act for appointing Commissioners, to take, examine, and state, the Debts due to the Army. (Repealed by Statute Law Revision Act 1867 (30 & 31 Vict. c. 59))
Navy, etc. Act 1714 (repealed)	1 Geo. 1. St. 2. c. 25	21 September 1715
An Act to prevent Disturbances by Seamen and others, and to preserve the Stores belonging to His Majesty's Navy Royal; and also for explaining an Act (Note: Embezzlement of Public Stores Act 1697 (9 Will. 3. c. 41)) for the better preventing the Embezzlement of His Majesty's Stores of War; and for preventing Cheats, Frauds, and Abuses, in paying Seamen's Wages; and for reviving and continuing an Act (Note: Piracy Act 1698 (11 Will. 3. c. 7)) for the more effectual Suppression of Piracy. (Repealed by Statute Law Revision Act 1867 (30 & 31 Vict. c. 59))
Continuance of Laws, etc. Act 1714 (repealed)	1 Geo. 1. St. 2. c. 26	21 September 1715
An Act for continuing several Laws therein mentioned, relating to Coals, Hemp, and Flax, Irish and Scotch Linen, and the Assize of Bread; and for giving Power to adjourn the Quarter Sessions for the County of Anglesea, for the Purposes therein mentioned. (Repealed by Promissory Oaths Act 1871 (34 & 35 Vict. c. 48))
Equivalent Act 1714 (repealed)	1 Geo. 1. St. 2. c. 27	21 September 1715
An act for taking and stating the debts due and growing due to Scotland by way of equivalent in the terms of the union; and for relief of the creditors of the publick in Scotland, and the commissioners of the equivalent. (Repealed by Statute Law Revision Act 1867 (30 & 31 Vict. c. 59))
Yule Vacance Act 1714 (repealed)	1 Geo. 1. St. 2. c. 28	21 September 1715
An act for repealing an act, intituled, "An act for repealing part of an act passed in the parliament of Scotland, intituled, 'Act for discharging the Yule vacance.'" (Note: Yule Vacance Act 1711 (10 Ann. c. 22)) (Repealed by Statute Law Revision Act 1867 (30 & 31 Vict. c. 59))
Foreign Protestants Naturalization Act 1714 (repealed)	1 Geo. 1. St. 2. c. 29	21 September 1715
An act for allowing a time for two hundred and thirteen families of protestant Palatines, now settled in Ireland, to take the oaths, in order to intitle them to all the benefits intended them by the act of the seventh year of her late Majesty's reign, (Note: Foreign Protestants Naturalization Act 1708 (7 Ann. c. 5)) for naturalizing foreign protestants. (Repealed by Statute Law Revision Act 1867 (30 & 31 Vict. c. 59))

=== Sources ===
- Pickering, Danby, ed. (1764). "Anno primo Georgii I. Stat. 2". The Statutes at Large. Vol. 13: From the Twelfth Year of Queen Anne to the Fifth Year of King George I. Cambridge: Joseph Bentham. pp. 137–323 – via Google Books.
- Journals of the House of Commons. Vol. 18. London: His Majesty's Stationery Office. 1803. pp. 3–12 – via Google Books.
- Chronological Table of and Index to the Statutes. Vol. 1: To the End of the Session 59 Vict. Sess. 2 (1895) (13th ed.). London: Her Majesty's Stationery Office. 1896. p. 92 – via Google Books.
- "Acts of the Parliament of Great Britain from 1714". legislation.gov.uk. The National Archives.

== See also ==
- List of acts of the Parliament of Great Britain
