= Forgery Act 1861 =

Act of the Parliament of the United Kingdom

Forgery Act 1861 (Note: The citation of this act by this short title was authorised by section 1 of, and the first schedule to, the Short Titles Act 1896. Due to the repeal of those provisions, it is now authorised by section 19(2) of the Interpretation Act 1978.)
- Act of Parliament
- Parliament of the United Kingdom
- Long title: An Act to consolidate and amend the Statute Law of England and Ireland relating to indictable Offences by Forgery.
- Citation: 24 & 25 Vict. c. 98
- Territorial extent: England and Wales; Ireland; (Note: Section 55.)

Dates
- Royal assent: 6 August 1861
- Commencement: 1 November 1861 (Note: Section 56.)
Other legislation
Amended by	Forgery Act 1870; Statute Law Revision Act 1892; Statute Law Revision (No. 2) Act 1893; Costs in Criminal Cases Act 1908; Forgery Act 1913; Indictments Act 1915; Criminal Justice Act (Northern Ireland) 1953; Criminal Law Act 1967; Theft Act 1968; Justices of the Peace Act 1968; Judgements (Enforcement) Act (Northern Ireland) 1969; Forgery and Counterfeiting Act 1981
Relates to	Treason (No. 2) Act 1553; Forgery Act 1830; Admiralty Powers, &c. Act 1865; Criminal Law Act 1967

Status: Amended

Text of statute as originally enacted

Revised text of statute as amended

Text of the Forgery Act 1861 as in force today (including any amendments) within the United Kingdom, from legislation.gov.uk.

The Forgery Act 1861 (24 & 25 Vict. c. 98) is an act of the Parliament of the United Kingdom that consolidated provisions related to forgery from a number of earlier statutes into a single act. For the most part these provisions were, according to the draftsman of the act, incorporated with little or no variation in their phraseology. It is one of a group of acts sometimes referred to as the Criminal Law Consolidation Acts 1861. It was passed with the object of simplifying the law. It is essentially a revised version of an earlier consolidation act, the Forgery Act 1830 (11 Geo. 4 & 1 Will. 4 c.66) (and the equivalent Irish act), incorporating subsequent statutes.

Most of it was repealed by the Forgery Act 1913, and today forgery is mostly covered by the Forgery and Counterfeiting Act 1981 and the Identity Documents Act 2010. However three offences under the 1861 act remain in force today (in sections 34, 36 and 37). These deal with forgery of registers of births, marriages and deaths, and with impersonation of a surety.

Certain kinds of forgery used to be high treason until this act downgraded them to felonies.

The act does not apply to Scotland.

== Subsequent developments ==
Section 51 of the act was repealed for England and Wales by section 8(2) of, and part II of schedule 5 to, the Justices of the Peace Act 1968, which came into force on 1 February 1969.

The whole act, except sections 34, 36, 37 and 55, was repealed for England and Wales and Northern Ireland by section 30 of, and part I of the schedule to, the Forgery and Counterfeiting Act 1981, which came into force on 27 October 1981.

The whole act was repealed for the Republic of Ireland by section 3(1) of, and schedule 1 to, the Criminal Justice (Theft and Fraud Offences) Act 2001, which came into force on 1 August 2002.

== See also ==
- Forgery Act
