= Forgery Act 1913 =

Act of the Parliament of the United Kingdom

Forgery Act 1913 (Note: Section 22.)
- Act of Parliament
- Parliament of the United Kingdom
- Long title: An Act to consolidate, simplify, and amend the Law-relating to Forgery and kindred Offences.
- Citation: 3 & 4 Geo. 5. c. 27
- Territorial extent: England and Wales; Ireland; (Note: Section 21.)

Dates
- Royal assent: 15 August 1913
- Commencement: 1 January 1914 (Note: Section 22.)
- Repealed: 27 October 1981
Other legislation
Amends	See § Repealed enactments
Repeals/revokes	See § Repealed enactments
Amended by	Criminal Justice Act 1948; Justices of the Peace Act 1949; Public Records Act 1958; Criminal Law Act 1967; Justices of the Peace Act 1968; Statute Law (Repeals) Act 1973; Hallmarking Act 1973
Repealed by	Forgery and Counterfeiting Act 1981

Status: Repealed

Text of statute as originally enacted

The Forgery Act 1913 (3 & 4 Geo. 5. c. 27) was an act of the Parliament of the United Kingdom. It provided a definition of forgery and created several offences of forgery and uttering, while repealing numerous other offences of forgery, thereby consolidating the law of forgery. It did not extend to Scotland.

== Sample indictments ==
The following specimen counts were formerly contained in paragraph 18 of the second schedule to the Indictments Act 1915 (5 & 6 Geo. 5. c. 90) before it was repealed.

STATEMENT OF OFFENCE.

First Count.

Forgery, contrary to section 2(1)(a) of the Forgery Act, 1913.

PARTICULARS OF OFFENCE.

A.B., on the day of , in the county of , with intent to defraud, forged a certain will purporting to be the will of C.D.

STATEMENT OF OFFENCE.

Second Count.

Uttering forged document, contrary to section 6(1)(2) of the Forgery Act, 1913.

PARTICULARS OF OFFENCE.

A.B., on the day of , in the county of , uttered a certain forged will purporting to be the will of C.D, knowing the same to be forged and with intent to defraud.

== Provisions ==
=== Repealed enactments ===
Section 20 of the act repealed 73 enactments, listed in parts I and II of the schedule to the act.

Part I – Enactments applicable to England and also in some cases to Ireland
Citation	Short title	Description	Extent of repeal
13 Geo. 3. c. 52	Plate Assay (Sheffield and Birmingham) Act 1772	The Plate Assay (Sheffield and Birmingham) Act, 1772.	Section fourteen from "shall cast, forge, or counterfeit" to "maker or worker of silver plate, or any or either of them; or," where those words thirdly occur; the words "any such forged or counterfeit mark, stamp, or impression thereon, or"; the words "forged, counterfeited, or," and from "or shall wilfully or knowingly have or be possessed of" to "maker or worker of silver plate, or any or either of them;" where those words lastly occur.
52 Geo. 3. c. 143	Land Tax Certificates Forgery Act 1812	The Land Tax Certificates Forgery Act, 1812.	The whole act so far as unrepealed.
5 Geo. 4. c. 52	Birmingham Assay Act 1824	The Birmingham Assay Act, 1824.	Section twenty-two from "shall cast, forge, or counterfeit" to "maker or worker of gold or silver plate, or any or either of them, or," where those words secondly occur; the words "any such forged or counterfeited mark, stamp, or impression thereon, or"; the words "forged or counterfeited or," and from "or shall wilfully or knowingly have or be possessed of" to "maker or worker of gold or silver plate, or any or either of them," where those words lastly occur.
5 Geo. 4. c. 113	Slave Trade Act 1824	The Slave Trade Act, 1824.	Section ten from "or shall wilfully and fraudulently forge" to "body politic or corporate."
7 Geo. 4. c. 16	Chelsea and Kilmainham Hospitals Act 1826	The Chelsea and Kilmainham Hospitals Act, 1826.	Section thirty-eight from "or if any person shall forge" to "any corporation whatsoever."
10 Geo. 4. c. 24	Government Annuities Act 1829	The Government Annuities Act, 1829.	Section forty-one except in so far as it relates to the offence of personation.
10 Geo. 4. c. 50	Crown Lands Act 1829	The Crown Lands Act, 1829.	Section one hundred and twenty-four.
2 & 3 Will. 4. c. 16	Excise Permit Act 1832	The Excise Permit Act, 1832.	Section three. Section four from "shall counterfeit or forge" to "or if any person or persons."
2 & 3 Will. 4. c. 53	Army Prize Act 1832	The Army Prize Act, 1832.	Section forty-nine from "or if any person shall forge" to "body politic or corporate whatsoever" where those words lastly occur.
2 & 3 Will. 4. c. 59	Government Annuities Act 1832	The Government Annuities Act, 1832.	Section nineteen except in so far as it relates to the offence of personation.
5 & 6 Will. 4. c. 24	Naval Enlistment Act 1835	The Naval Enlistment Act, 1835.	Section three to "for himself or any other person; or"
1 & 2 Vict. c. 94	Public Record Office Act 1838	The Public Record Office Act, 1838.	Section nineteen from "and every person who" to "Record Office."
2 & 3 Vict. c. 51	Pensions Act 1839	The Pensions Act, 1839.	Section nine.
3 & 4 Vict. c. 92	Non-Parochial Registers Act 1840	The Non-Parochial Registers Act, 1840.	Section eight from "or shall falsely" to "register or record" and the words "or shall forge or counterfeit the seal of the said office."
3 & 4 Vict. c. 111	Joint Stock Companies Act 1840	The Joint Stock Companies Act, 1840.	In section two the word "forgery" in both places where it occurs.
5 & 6 Vict. c. 35	Income Tax Act 1842	The Income Tax Act, 1842.	Section one hundred and eighty-one.
7 & 8 Vict. c. 19	Inferior Courts Act 1844	The Inferior Courts Act, 1844.	Section five from "forge the seal" to "knowing the same to be forged or."
7 & 8 Vict. c. 22	Gold and Silver Wares Act 1844	The Gold and Silver Wares Act, 1844.	Section two from the beginning of the section to the words "base metal, and"; the words "any such forged or counterfeit die or other instrument as aforesaid or"; the words "the mark of any such forged or counterfeit die or other instrument as aforesaid, or having thereupon any such forged or counterfeit mark or imitation of a mark as aforesaid or"; and the words "forged, counterfeited, imitated, marked."
8 & 9 Vict. c. 113	Evidence Act 1845	The Evidence Act, 1845.	Section four from "if any person" to "knowing the same to be false or counterfeit."
11 & 12 Vict. c. 78	Crown Cases Act 1848	The Crown Cases Act, 1848.	Section six.
11 & 12 Vict. c. 121	Liqueur Act 1848	The Liqueur Act, 1848.	Section eighteen from "and every person not being so authorised" to "knowing the same to be counterfeited."
14 & 15 Vict. c. 99	Evidence Act 1851	The Evidence Act, 1851.	Section seventeen.
16 & 17 Vict. c. 45	Government Annuities Act 1853	The Government Annuities Act, 1853.	Section thirty-one except in so far as it relates to the offence of personation.
16 & 17 Vict. c. 107	Customs Consolidation Act 1853	The Customs Consolidation Act, 1853.	Section one hundred and sixteen.
17 & 18 Vict. c. 112	Literary and Scientific Institutions Act 1854	The Literary and Scientific Institutions Act, 1854.	In section twenty-six the words "or shall forge any deed, bond, security for money, receipt, or other instrument."
20 & 21 Vict. c. 77	Court of Probate Act 1857	The Court of Probate Act, 1857.	Section twenty-eight.
20 & 21 Vict. c. 81	Burials Act 1857	The Burials Act, 1857.	Section fifteen from "or shall falsely make or counterfeit" to "copy thereof" and the words "or shall forge or counterfeit the seal of any burial board."
24 & 25 Vict. c. 98	Forgery Act 1861	The Forgery Act, 1861.	Sections one, two, four, seven to twenty-seven both inclusive. Section twenty-eight from "other than such clerk" to "knowing the same to be forged or" where those words lastly occur. Sections twenty-nine to thirty-three, both inclusive. Section thirty-five. Section thirty-six from "or shall forge" to "or of any part thereof"; the words "or shall forge or counterfeit the seal of or belonging to any register office or burial board"; the words "or seal"; and the words "forged or altered" in both places where they occur. Section thirty-seven from "or shall forge" to "as aforesaid," where those words first occur. Sections thirty-eight to forty-one, both inclusive. Sections forty-five and forty-six.
25 & 26 Vict. c. 7	India Stocks Transfer Act 1862	The India Stocks Transfer Act, 1862.	Section fourteen.
25 & 26 Vict. c. 67	Declaration of Title Act 1862	The Declaration of Title Act, 1862.	Section forty-five.
26 & 27 Vict. c. 7	Manufactured Tobacco Act 1863	The Manufactured Tobacco Act, 1863.	Section seven from "and if any person" to the end of the section.
26 & 27 Vict. c. 73	India Stock Certificate Act 1863	The India Stock Certificate Act, 1863.	Section thirteen.
29 & 30 Vict. c. 25	Exchequer Bills and Bonds Act 1866	The Exchequer Bills and Bonds Act, 1866.	Section fifteen.
31 & 32 Vict. c. 37	Documentary Evidence Act 1868	The Documentary Evidence Act, 1868.	Section twenty.
32 & 33 Vict. c. 49	Local Stamps Act 1869	The Local Stamps Act, 1869.	Section twenty-one. In section twenty-five the words "fifteen, twenty, twenty-one." In section twenty-six the words "twenty, twenty-one." In section four, subsection two. In section eight, subsections one, two, three, four, six, seven, and eight.
32 & 33 Vict. c. 106	East India Loan Act 1869	The East India Loan Act, 1869.	Section thirteen.
33 & 34 Vict. c. 58	Forgery Act 1870	The Forgery Act, 1870.	Sections three, five, and six.
35 & 36 Vict. c. 33	Ballot Act 1872	The Ballot Act, 1872.	In section three, subsection one, the words "forges or," and the words "or delivers to the returning officer any nomination paper knowing the same to be forged," and subsection two the words "forges, or counterfeits, or,"
35 & 36 Vict. c. 44	Court of Chancery Funds Act 1872	The Court of Chancery Funds Act, 1872.	Section twelve.
36 & 37 Vict. c. 32	East India Loan Act 1873	The East India Loan Act, 1873.	Section thirteen.
37 & 38 Vict. c. 3	East India Loan Act 1874	The East India Loan Act, 1874.	Section thirteen.
37 & 38 Vict. c. 88	Births and Deaths Registration Act 1874	The Births and Deaths Registration Act, 1874.	Section forty from "and on conviction on indictment" to the end of the section. Section forty-six.
38 & 39 Vict. c. 17	Explosives Act 1875	The Explosives Act, 1875.	Section eighty-one except in so far as it refers to giving, signing, or making use of any licence, certificate, document, or plan false in a material particular.
38 & 39 Vict. c. 63	Sale of Food and Drugs Act 1875	The Sale of Food and Drugs Act, 1875.	Section twenty-seven from "any person" to "hard labour."
39 & 40 Vict. c. 36	Customs Consolidation Act 1876	The Customs Consolidation Act, 1876.	Section twenty-eight.
40 & 41 Vict. c. 2	Treasury Bills Act 1877	The Treasury Bills Act, 1877.	Section ten.
40 & 41 Vict. c. 51	East India Loan Act 1877	The East India Loan Act, 1877.	Section fifteen.
42 & 43 Vict. c. 60	East India Loan Act 1879	The East India Loan Act, 1879.	Section fourteen.
43 Vict. c. 10	East India Loan (East Indian Railway Debentures) Act 1880	The East India Loan (East Indian Railway Debentures) Act, 1880.	Section twelve.
45 & 46 Vict. c. 50	Municipal Corporations Act 1882	The Municipal Corporations Act, 1882.	In section seventy-four the words "forges or" and the words "or delivers to the town clerk any forged nomination paper knowing it to be forged." Section two hundred and thirty-five.
46 & 47 Vict. c. 22	Sea Fisheries Act 1883	The Sea Fisheries Act, 1883.	Section seventeen, subsection four, from "and on conviction on indictment" to the end of the section.
46 & 47 Vict. c. 55	Customs and Inland Revenue Act 1883	The Customs and Inland Revenue Act, 1883.	In section seventeen the words "and section twenty-five of the Forgery Act, 1861."
48 & 49 Vict. c. 28	East India Loan Act 1885	The East India Loan Act, 1885.	Section twelve.
48 & 49 Vict. c. 49	Submarine Telegraph Act 1885	The Submarine Telegraph Act, 1885.	In section eight, subsection four, from "and on conviction on indictment" to the end of the section.
51 & 52 Vict. c. 43	County Courts Act 1888	The County Courts Act, 1888.	Section one hundred and eighty from "forge the seal" to "knowing the same to be forged or."
52 Vict. c. 10	Commissioners for Oaths Act 1889	The Commissioners of Oaths Act, 1889.	Sections eight, nine, and ten.
53 Vict. c. 5	Lunacy Act 1890	The Lunacy Act, 1890.	Section one hundred and forty-seven.
54 & 55 Vict. c. 38	Stamp Duties Management Act 1891	The Stamp Duties Management Act, 1891.	Section thirteen, subsections (1) and (2), and in subsection (8) the words "any forged stamp or" and in subsection (9) the words "any forged die or stamp or." Section fourteen. Section fifteen.
56 & 57 Vict. c. 70	East India Loan Act 1893	The East India Loan Act, 1893.	Section seventeen.
61 & 62 Vict. c. 13	East India Loan Act 1898	The East India Loan Act, 1898.	In section eight the words "and as to criminal offences."
63 Vict. c. 2	War Loan Act 1900	The War Loan Act, 1900.	Section four, subsection three.
1 Edw. 7. c. 25	East India Loan (Great Indian Peninsula Railway Debentures) Act 1901	The East India Loan (Great Indian Peninsula Railway Debentures) Act, 1901.	In section seven the words "and as to criminal offences."
5 Edw. 7. c. 19	East India Loans (Railways) Act 1905	The East India Loans (Railways) Act, 1905.	Section five so far as it incorporates section seventeen of the East India Loan Act, 1893.
8 Edw. 7. c. 54	East India Loans Act 1908	The East India Loans Act, 1908.	Section six so far as it incorporates section seventeen of the East India Loan Act, 1893.
8 Edw. 7. c. 69	Companies (Consolidation) Act 1908	The Companies (Consolidation) Act, 1908.	Section thirty-eight, subsection one, from "(i) with intent to defraud," to "altered or," and subsection two.
10 Edw. 7. c. 5	East India Loans (Railways) Act 1910	The East India Loans (Railways) Act, 1910.	Section four so far as it incorporates section seventeen of the East India Loan Act, 1893.
10 Edw. 7 & 1 Geo. 5. c. 24	Licensing (Consolidation) Act 1910	The Licensing (Consolidation) Act, 1910.	Section forty-four, subsection one.

Part II – Enactments applying only to Ireland
Citation	Short title	Description	Extent of repeal
23 & 24 Geo. 3. c. 23 (I)	Gold and Silver Wares (Ireland) Act 1783	An Act to regulate the assay of gold and promote the manufacture of gold and silver wares in this Kingdom.	Section twenty-eight from "shall counterfeit or cause to be counterfeited" to "assay offices respectively, or", where those words secondly occur, the words "upon which such counterfeited or imitated mark, stamp, or impression shall have been made as aforesaid, or", and the words "such mark, stamp, or impression to have been counterfeited or imitated as aforesaid or."
20 & 21 Vict. c. 60	Irish Bankrupt and Insolvent Act 1857	The Irish Bankrupt and Insolvent Act, 1857.	Section three hundred and ninety-seven.
20 & 21 Vict. c. 79	Probates and Letters of Administration Act (Ireland) 1857	The Probates and Letters of Administration Act (Ireland), 1857.	Section thirty-three.
34 & 35 Vict. c. 22	Lunacy Regulation (Ireland) Act 1871	The Lunacy Regulation (Ireland) Act, 1871.	Section fifty.
34 & 35 Vict. c. 49	Matrimonial Causes and Marriage Law (Ireland) Amendment Act 1871	The Matrimonial Causes and Marriage Law (Ireland) Amendment Act, 1871.	Sections fifteen and eighteen.
43 & 44 Vict. c. 13	Births and Deaths Registration (Ireland) Act 1880	The Births and Deaths Registration (Ireland) Act, 1880.	Section thirty, from "and on conviction on indictment" to the end of the section. Section thirty-six.

== Subsequent developments ==
Section 13 of the act was repealed for England and Wales by section 10(2) of, and part II of schedule 3 to, the Criminal Law Act 1967, which came into force on 1 January 1968.

Section 12 of the act, so far as unrepealed, was repealed for England and Wales by section 8(2) of, and part II of schedule 5 to, the Justices of the Peace Act 1968, which came into force on 1 February 1969.

The whole act was repealed for England and Wales and Northern Ireland by section 30 of, and part I of the schedule to, the Forgery and Counterfeiting Act 1981, which came into force on 27 October 1981.

The whole act was repealed for the Republic of Ireland by section 3(1) of, and schedule 1 to, the Criminal Justice (Theft and Fraud Offences) Act 2001, which came into force on 1 August 2002.

== See also ==
- Forgery Act
