= Diseases of Animals Act =

Series of acts of the UK Parliament

The Diseases of Animals Acts are a series of acts of Parliament of the UK to deal with the possibility of the accrual of economic harm or intra-species contamination. They follow on from the 19th-century series titled Contagious Diseases (Animals) Act.

The Diseases of Animals Act 1894 was designed to combat "heavy losses" due to cattle diseases such as rinderpest, contagious bovine pleuropneumonia and foot-and-mouth disease (FMD).

The series was consolidated by the Diseases of Animals Act 1950, which authorised the Minister of Agriculture and Fisheries (today the Secretary of State for Environment, Food and Rural Affairs), when all other avenues of tuberculin prevention failed, to cull animals (including badgers), and to halt the transportation of cattle from herds prone to FMD. Apparently the definition of poultry needed to be extended by the Diseases of Animals (Extension of Definition of Poultry) Order 1953 (SI 1953/37), to include birds of the species psittaciformes, doves, peafowl and swans. The series was stopped and continued by the Animal Health Act 1981 (c. 22).

- Diseases of Animals Act 1894 (57 & 58 Vict. c. 57)
- Diseases of Animals Act 1896 (59 & 60 Vict. c. 15)
- Diseases of Animals Act 1903 (3 Edw. 7. c. 43)
- Diseases of Animals Act 1909 (9 Edw. 7. c. 26)
- Diseases of Animals Act 1910 (10 Edw. 7 & 1 Geo. 5. c. 20)
- Diseases of Animals (Ireland) Act 1914 (4 & 5 Geo. 5. c. 40)
- Diseases of Animals Act 1922 (12 & 13 Geo. 5. c. 8)
- Diseases of Animals Act 1924 (14 & 15 Geo. 5. c. 3)
- Diseases of Animals Act 1925 (15 & 16 Geo. 5. c. 63)
- Diseases of Animals Act 1927 (17 & 18 Geo. 5. c. 13)
- Diseases of Animals Act 1935 (25 & 26 Geo. 5. c. 31)
- Diseases of Animals Act 1950 (14 Geo. 6. c. 36)
- Diseases of Animals Act 1975 (c. 40)

== See also ==
- Slaughter of Poultry Act 1967
