= Contagious Diseases (Animals) Act =

Animal disease control laws in the UK

The Contagious Diseases (Animals) Acts are a series of acts of Parliament of the United Kingdom to deal with the possibility of the accrual of economic harm or intra-species contamination. In 1892, the local authorities were not making sufficient use of powers to combat animal diseases so the Act introduced central control over the slaughter of infected animals and the payment of compensation. The 1893 act transferred from local authorities to the Board of Agriculture the responsibility for wiping out swine fever. It was followed by the 20th-century series notation Diseases of Animals Act. Rabid dogs were included in 1878.

- Contagious Diseases (Animals) Act 1853 (16 & 17 Vict. c. 62)
- Contagious Diseases, Animals Act 1856 (19 & 20 Vict. c. 101)
- Contagious Diseases (Animals) Act 1867 (30 & 31 Vict. c. 125)
- Contagious Diseases (Animals) Act 1869 (32 & 33 Vict. c. 70)
- Contagious Diseases (animals) (Scotland) Act 1875 (38 & 39 Vict. c. 75)
- Contagious Diseases (Animals) Act 1878 (41 & 42 Vict. c. 74)
- Contagious Diseases (Animals) Act 1884 (47 & 48 Vict. c. 13)
- Contagious Diseases (Animals) Transfer of Parts of Districts Act 1884 (47 & 48 Vict. c. 47)
- Contagious Diseases Acts Repeal Act 1886 (49 & 50 Vict. c. 10)
- Contagious Diseases (Animals) Act 1886 (49 & 50 Vict. c. 32)
- Contagious Diseases (Animals) (Pleuro-pneumonia) Act 1890 (53 & 54 Vict. c. 14)
- Contagious Diseases (Animals) Act 1892 (55 & 56 Vict. c. 47)
- Contagious Diseases (Animals) Act 1893 (56 & 57 Vict. c. 43)

The Contagious Diseases (Animals) Acts 1878 and 1884 was the collective title of the Contagious Diseases (Animals) Act 1878 and the Contagious Diseases (Animals) Act 1884.

The Contagious Diseases (Animals) Acts 1878 to 1886 was the collective title of the Contagious Diseases (Animals) Acts 1878 and 1884, the Contagious Diseases (Animals) Transfer of Parts of Districts Act 1884 and the Contagious Diseases (Animals) Act 1886.

The Contagious Diseases (Animals) Acts 1878 to 1890 was the collective title of Contagious Diseases (Animals) Acts 1878 to 1886 and the Contagious Diseases (Animals) (Pleuro-pneumonia) Act 1890.
