= Petroleum (Production) Act 1918 =

Act of the Parliament of the United Kingdom

Petroleum (Production) Act 1918 (Note: Section 7.)
- Act of Parliament
- Parliament of the United Kingdom
- Long title: An Act to make provision with respect to the searching and boring for and getting Petroleum, and for purposes connected therewith.
- Citation: 8 & 9 Geo. 5. c. 52
- Territorial extent: United Kingdom

Dates
- Royal assent: 21 November 1918
- Commencement: 21 November 1918 (Note: The Acts of Parliament (Commencement) Act 1793.)
- Repealed: England and Wales and Scotland: 12 July 1934; Northern Ireland: 13 October 1964
Other legislation
Repealed by	England and Wales and Scotland: Petroleum (Production) Act 1934; Northern Ireland: Petroleum (Production) Act (Northern Ireland) 1964

Status: Repealed

Text of statute as originally enacted

The Petroleum (Production) Act 1918 (8 & 9 Geo. 5. c. 52) was an act of the Parliament of the United Kingdom which regulates the exploration and production of petroleum from underground strata.

== Background ==
In the early the twentieth century, Britain imported most of its petroleum from the Middle East and America. The First World War reduced access to some of these sources and increased the demand and use of petroleum. The government wanted to develop indigenous (UK) sources of petroleum but wished to avoid ‘wildcat’ development which had taken place in the USA. Legislation was therefore required to control the petroleum industry. The regulatory regime allowed only agents of the Crown or those licensed by the Crown to search for, or produce, petroleum.

== Provisions ==
The act received royal assent on 21 November 1918. Its long title is 'An Act to make provision with respect to the searching and boring for and getting Petroleum, and for purposes connected therewith'.

The act comprises seven sections

- Section 1 – Prohibition on persons other than the Crown getting etc. petroleum
- Section 2 – Powers of Minister of Munitions
- Section 3 – Powers to inspect plans of mines
- Section 4 – Records of petroleum gotten
- Section 5 – Interpretation
- Section 6 – Savings
- Section 7 – Short Title

== Subsequent developments ==
Between the enactment of the act and 1934 only seven licences were issued and by 1934 only three were in force.

The whole act was repealed for England and Wales and Scotland by section 11(2) of the Petroleum (Production) Act 1934 (24 & 25 Geo. 5. c. 36), which came into force on 12 July 1934. The act vested in the Crown the property in petroleum and natural gas within Great Britain

== See also ==
- Petroleum Act
