= Jacob Wilson =

Jacob Wilson may refer to:

- Jacob Wilson (racing driver) (born 1990), American racing driver
- Jacob Wilson (utility player) (born 1992), American baseball utility player
- Jacob Wilson (shortstop) (born 2002), American baseball shortstop
- Jacob Wilson (agriculturist) (1836–1905), English land agent, cattle breeder, and agriculturist

== See also ==
- Jake Wilson (disambiguation)
