= List of acts of the Parliament of the United Kingdom from 1918 =

This is a complete list of acts of the Parliament of the United Kingdom for the year 1918.

Note that the first parliament of the United Kingdom was held in 1801; parliaments between 1707 and 1800 were either parliaments of Great Britain or of Ireland). For acts passed up until 1707, see the list of acts of the Parliament of England and the list of acts of the Parliament of Scotland. For acts passed from 1707 to 1800, see the list of acts of the Parliament of Great Britain. See also the list of acts of the Parliament of Ireland.

For acts of the devolved parliaments and assemblies in the United Kingdom, see the list of acts of the Scottish Parliament, the list of acts of the Northern Ireland Assembly, and the list of acts and measures of Senedd Cymru; see also the list of acts of the Parliament of Northern Ireland.

The number shown after each act's title is its chapter number. Acts passed before 1963 are cited using this number, preceded by the year(s) of the reign during which the relevant parliamentary session was held; thus the Union with Ireland Act 1800 is cited as "39 & 40 Geo. 3. c. 67", meaning the 67th act passed during the session that started in the 39th year of the reign of George III and which finished in the 40th year of that reign. Note that the modern convention is to use Arabic numerals in citations (thus "41 Geo. 3" rather than "41 Geo. III"). Acts of the last session of the Parliament of Great Britain and the first session of the Parliament of the United Kingdom are both cited as "41 Geo. 3". Acts passed from 1963 onwards are simply cited by calendar year and chapter number.

== 7 & 8 Geo. 5 ==
Continuing the seventh session of the 30th Parliament of the United Kingdom, which met from 7 February 1917 until 6 February 1918.

This session was also traditionally cited as 7 & 8 G. 5.

=== Public general acts ===
Short title	Citation	Royal assent
Long title
Coal Mines Control Agreement (Confirmation) Act 1918 (repealed)	7 & 8 Geo. 5. c. 56	6 February 1918
An Act to confirm and give effect to a certain Agreement relating to the Compensation to be paid in respect of the Control of Coal Mines and other Matters arising out of such Control. (Repealed for England and Wales and Scotland by Coal Mines (Emergency) Act 1920 (10 & 11 Geo. 5. c. 4) and for Northern Ireland by Statute Law Revision Act (Northern Ireland) 1954 (c. 35 (N.I.)))
Bishoprics of Bradford and Coventry Act 1918 (repealed)	7 & 8 Geo. 5. c. 57	6 February 1918
An Act to provide for the foundation of Bishoprics of Bradford and Coventry and for matters incidental thereto. (Repealed by Statute Law (Repeals) Act 1973 (c. 39))
Wills (Soldiers and Sailors) Act 1918	7 & 8 Geo. 5. c. 58	6 February 1918
An Act to amend the Law with respect to Testamentary Dispositions by Soldiers and Sailors.
Midwives (Ireland) Act 1918 (repealed)	7 & 8 Geo. 5. c. 59	6 February 1918
An Act to secure the better training of Midwives in Ireland, and to regulate their practice. (Repealed by Nurses and Midwives Act (Northern Ireland) 1959 (c. 19 (N.I.)))
National Registration (Amendment) Act 1918 (repealed)	7 & 8 Geo. 5. c. 60	6 February 1918
An Act to extend and amend the National Registration Act, 1915. (Note: National Registration Act 1915 (5 & 6 Geo. 5. c. 60)) (Repealed by Statute Law Revision Act 1927 (17 & 18 Geo. 5. c. 42))
Metropolitan Police Act 1918 (repealed)	7 & 8 Geo. 5. c. 61	6 February 1918
An Act to amend the Metropolitan Police Act, 1912. (Note: Metropolitan Police Act 1912 (2 & 3 Geo. 5. c. 4)) (Repealed by Statute Law Revision Act 1927 (17 & 18 Geo. 5. c. 42))
National Health Insurance Act 1918 (repealed)	7 & 8 Geo. 5. c. 62	6 February 1918
An Act to amend the Acts relating to National Health Insurance. (Repealed by National Health Insurance Act 1924 (14 & 15 Geo. 5. c. 38))
National Insurance (Unemployment) Act 1918 (repealed)	7 & 8 Geo. 5. c. 63	6 February 1918
An Act to amend the National Insurance (Part II.) (Munition Workers) Act, 1916, (Note: National Insurance (Part II.) (Munition Workers) Act 1916 (6 & 7 Geo. 5. c. 20)) and to amend the National Insurance (Unemployment) Acts, 1911 to 1916, with respect to the proportion to be borne by the amount of unemployment benefit to the number of contributions paid. (Repealed by Unemployment Insurance Act 1920 (10 & 11 Geo. 5. c. 30))
Representation of the People Act 1918 (repealed)	7 & 8 Geo. 5. c. 64	6 February 1918
An Act to amend the Law with respect to Parliamentary and Local Government Franchises, and the Registration of Parliamentary and Local Government Electors, and the conduct of elections, and to provide for the Redistribution of Seats at Parliamentary Elections, and for other purposes connected therewith. (Repealed by Representation of the People Act 1985 (c. 50))
Redistribution of Seats (Ireland) Act 1918 (repealed)	7 & 8 Geo. 5. c. 65	6 February 1918
An Act to provide for the Redistribution of Seats at Parliamentary Elections in Ireland and for purposes connected therewith. (Repealed by Elections and Franchise Act (Northern Ireland) 1946 (9 & 10 Geo. 6. c. 8 (N.I.)), Representation of the People Act 1948 (11 & 12 Geo. 6. c. 65) and Statute Law Revision Act (Northern Ireland) 1954 (c. 35 (N.I.)))
Military Service Act 1918 (repealed)	7 & 8 Geo. 5. c. 66	6 February 1918
An Act to repeal subsection (3) of section three of the Military Service Act, 1916, (Note: Military Service Act 1916 (5 & 6 Geo. 5. c. 104)) and to provide for the cancellation of certificates of exemption from military service granted on occupational grounds. (Repealed by Statute Law Revision Act 1927 (17 & 18 Geo. 5. c. 42))
Non-Ferrous Metal Industry Act 1918 (repealed)	7 & 8 Geo. 5. c. 67	6 February 1918
An Act to restrict temporarily the persons who may engage in business connected with certain non-ferrous metals and metallic ores. (Repealed by Former Enemy Aliens (Disabilities Removal) Act 1925 (15 & 16 Geo. 5. c. 43))

=== Local acts ===
Short title	Citation	Royal assent
Long title
Port Glasgow Water Order Confirmation Act 1918	7 & 8 Geo. 5. c. lx	6 February 1918
An Act to confirm a Provisional Order under the Private Legislation Procedure (Scotland) Act 1889 (Note: Private Legislation Procedure (Scotland) Act 1899 (62 & 63 Vict. c. 47)) relating to Port Glasgow Water.
	Port Glasgow Water Order 1917 Provisional Order to authorise the Provost Magistrates and Councillors of the Burgh of Port Glasgow to make and maintain additional Waterworks and for other purposes.	

=== Sources ===
- 7 & 8 George V - 1917-8 – via HathiTrust.
- Journals of the House of Commons (PDF). Vol. 172 (February 1917 - February 1918) – via parliament.uk.

== 8 & 9 Geo. 5 ==
The eighth session of the 30th Parliament of the United Kingdom, which met from 12 February 1918 until 21 November 1918.

This session was also traditionally cited as 8 & 9 G. 5.

=== Public general acts ===
Short title	Citation	Royal assent
Long title
Consolidated Fund (No. 1) Act 1918 (repealed)	8 & 9 Geo. 5. c. 1	19 March 1918
An Act to apply certain sums out of the Consolidated Fund to the service of the years ending on the thirty-first day of March one thousand nine hundred and eighteen and one thousand nine hundred and nineteen. (Repealed by Statute Law Revision Act 1927 (17 & 18 Geo. 5. c. 42))
Marriages (Ireland) Act 1918 (repealed)	8 & 9 Geo. 5. c. 2	21 March 1918
An Act to extend the Hours within which Marriages may be lawfully solemnized in Ireland. (Repealed by Marriage and Matrimonial Causes Act (Northern Ireland) 1946 (9 & 10 Geo. 6. c. 16 (N.I.)))
Overseas Trade Department (Secretary) Act 1918 (repealed)	8 & 9 Geo. 5. c. 3	21 March 1918
An Act to make provision for the joint appointment by the Board of Trade and the Secretary of State for Foreign Affairs of a Secretary of the Overseas Trade Department. (Repealed by Ministers of the Crown (Transfer of Functions) Act 1946 (9 & 10 Geo. 6. c. 31))
Trustee Savings Banks Act 1918 (repealed)	8 & 9 Geo. 5. c. 4	18 April 1918
An Act to amend the Trustee Savings Banks Acts, 1863 to 1904, with respect to Special Investments and the Separate Surplus Fund. (Repealed by Trustee Savings Banks Act 1954 (2 & 3 Eliz. 2. c. 63))
Military Service (No. 2) Act 1918 (repealed)	8 & 9 Geo. 5. c. 5	18 April 1918
An Act to make further provision with respect to Military Service during the present war. (Repealed by Statute Law Revision Act 1927 (17 & 18 Geo. 5. c. 42))
Army (Annual) Act 1918 (repealed)	8 & 9 Geo. 5. c. 6	30 April 1918
An Act to provide, during Twelve Months, for the Discipline and Regulation of the Army. (Repealed by Statute Law Revision Act 1927 (17 & 18 Geo. 5. c. 42) and Revision of the Army and Air Force Acts (Transitional Provisions) Act 1955 (3 & 4 Eliz. 2. c. 20))
Increase of Rent, &c. (Amendment) Act 1918 (repealed)	8 & 9 Geo. 5. c. 7	2 May 1918
An Act to restrict the meaning of the expression landlord in subsection (3) of section one of the Increase of Rent and Mortgage Interest (War Restrictions) Act, 1915. (Note: Increase of Rent and Mortgage Interest (War Restrictions) Act 1915 (5 & 6 Geo. 5. c. 97)) (Repealed for the United Kingdom by Increase of Rent, &c. (Amendment) Act 1919 (9 & 10 Geo. 5. c. 90) and for the Isle of Man by Statute Law (Repeals) Act 2004 (c. 14))
Workmen's Compensation (Illegal Employment) Act 1918 (repealed)	8 & 9 Geo. 5. c. 8	16 May 1918
An Act to amend the Workmen's Compensation Act, 1906, (Note: Workmen's Compensation Act 1906 (6 Edw. 7. c. 58)) with respect to persons suffering injury while working under an illegal contract. (Repealed for England and Wales and Scotland by Workmen's Compensation Act 1925 (15 & 16 Geo. 5. c. 84) and for Northern Ireland by Workmen's Compensation Act (Northern Ireland) 1927 (17 & 18 Geo. 5. c. 16 (N.I.)))
Defence of the Realm (Food Profits) Act 1918 (repealed)	8 & 9 Geo. 5. c. 9	16 May 1918
An Act to provide for the forfeiture to His Majesty of double the amount received from the sale of goods at prices in excess of those allowed by the Food Controller. (Repealed by Statute Law Revision Act 1927 (17 & 18 Geo. 5. c. 42))
Post Office Act 1918 (repealed)	8 & 9 Geo. 5. c. 10	16 May 1918
An Act to alter the statutory limits of Postal Rates. (Repealed by Post Office and Telegraph Act 1920 (10 & 11 Geo. 5. c. 40))
Consolidated Fund (No. 2) Act 1918 (repealed)	8 & 9 Geo. 5. c. 11	27 June 1918
An Act to apply a sum out of the Consolidated Fund to the service of the year ending on the thirty-first day of March one thousand nine hundred and nineteen. (Repealed by Statute Law Revision Act 1927 (17 & 18 Geo. 5. c. 42))
Defence of the Realm (Beans, Peas, and Pulse Orders) Act 1918 (repealed)	8 & 9 Geo. 5. c. 12	27 June 1918
An Act to give full effect to two Orders, relating to Beans, Peas, and Pulse, made by the Food Controller under the Defence of the Realm Regulations. (Repealed by Statute Law Revision Act 1927 (17 & 18 Geo. 5. c. 42))
Horse Breeding Act 1918 (repealed)	8 & 9 Geo. 5. c. 13	27 June 1918
An Act to regulate the use of Stallions for Stud purposes. (Repealed for England and Wales and Scotland by Horse Breeding Act 1958 (6 & 7 Eliz. 2. c. 43) and for Northern Ireland by Horse Breeding Act (Northern Ireland) 1926 (16 & 17 Geo. 5. c. 30 (N.I.)))
Workmen's Compensation (Silicosis) Act 1918 (repealed)	8 & 9 Geo. 5. c. 14	30 July 1918
An Act to provide for the payment of compensation in the case of workmen who suffer death or disablement or are suspended from employment owing to the disease known as fibroid phthisis or silicosis of the lungs. (Repealed for England and Wales and Scotland by Workmen's Compensation Act 1925 (15 & 16 Geo. 5. c. 84) and for Northern Ireland by Workmen's Compensation Act (Northern Ireland) 1927 (17 & 18 Geo. 5. c. 16 (N.I.)))
Finance Act 1918 (repealed)	8 & 9 Geo. 5. c. 15	30 July 1918
An Act to grant certain duties of Customs and Inland Revenue (including Excise), to alter other duties, and to amend the Law relating to Customs and Inland Revenue (including Excise) and the National Debt, and to make further provision in connection with Finance. (Repealed by Statute Law (Repeals) Act 1986 (c. 12))
Solicitors (Articled Clerks) Act 1918 (repealed)	8 & 9 Geo. 5. c. 16	30 July 1918
An Act to modify the requirements of the Solicitors Acts, 1839 to 1917, with respect to Articled Clerks who have served in His Majesty's forces or in other public service, or have been Prisoners of War or interned in connection with the present war. (Repealed by Statute Law Revision Act 1927 (17 & 18 Geo. 5. c. 42))
Land Drainage Act 1918 (repealed)	8 & 9 Geo. 5. c. 17	30 July 1918
An Act to amend the Land Drainage Act, 1861, (Note: Land Drainage Act 1861 (24 & 25 Vict. c. 133)) and to make further provision for the drainage of agricultural land. (Repealed by Land Drainage Act 1930 (20 & 21 Geo. 5. c. 44))
Summary Jurisdiction (Ireland) Act 1918	8 & 9 Geo. 5. c. 18	30 July 1918
An Act to amend sections eleven and thirty-four of the Petty Sessions (Ireland) Act, 1851, (Note: Petty Sessions (Ireland) Act 1851 (14 & 15 Vict. c. 93)) and section ten of the Fines Act (Ireland), 1851. (Note: Fines Act (Ireland) 1851 (14 & 15 Vict. c. 90))
Deputy Lieutenants Act 1918 (repealed)	8 & 9 Geo. 5. c. 19	30 July 1918
An Act to amend the Law with respect to the qualifications of Deputy Lieutenants. (Repealed by Reserve Forces Act 1966 (c. 30))
Labourers (Ireland) Act 1918 (repealed)	8 & 9 Geo. 5. c. 20	30 July 1918
An Act to suspend the operation of section fifteen of the Labourers (Ireland) Act, 1883. (Note: Labourers (Ireland) Act 1883 (46 & 47 Vict. c. 60)) (Repealed by Statute Law Revision Act 1927 (17 & 18 Geo. 5. c. 42))
Expiring Laws Continuance Act 1918 (repealed)	8 & 9 Geo. 5. c. 21	30 July 1918
An Act to continue certain Expiring Laws. (Repealed by Statute Law Revision Act 1927 (17 & 18 Geo. 5. c. 42))
Parliament and Local Elections Act 1918 (repealed)	8 & 9 Geo. 5. c. 22	30 July 1918
An Act to make further provision for the prolongation of the present Parliament, and the postponement of Local Elections. (Repealed by Statute Law Revision Act 1927 (17 & 18 Geo. 5. c. 42))
Juries Act 1918 (repealed)	8 & 9 Geo. 5. c. 23	30 July 1918
An Act to limit the right to a jury in certain civil cases, to raise the age for jury service, to amend the Law with respect to the preparation and publication of jury lists, and to enable coroners' inquests in certain cases to be held without a jury. (Repealed by Coroners (Amendment) Act 1926 (16 & 17 Geo. 5. c. 59) and Statute Law Revision Act 1927 (17 & 18 Geo. 5. c. 42))
Flax Companies (Financial Assistance) Act 1918 (repealed)	8 & 9 Geo. 5. c. 24	30 July 1918
An Act to enable Companies and other bodies to give Financial Assistance to Flax Companies. (Repealed by Statute Law (Repeals) Act 1986 (c. 12))
War Loan Act 1918 (repealed)	8 & 9 Geo. 5. c. 25	30 July 1918
An Act to make further provision for raising Money for the present War, and to amend the War Loan (Supplemental Provisions) Act, 1915. (Note: War Loan (Supplemental Provisions) Act 1915 (5 & 6 Geo. 5. c. 93)) (Repealed by National Debt Act 1958 (7 & 8 Eliz. 2. c. 6))
Small Holding Colonies (Amendment) Act 1918	8 & 9 Geo. 5. c. 26	30 July 1918
An Act to authorise an increase in the Amount of Land which may be acquired for the purposes of the Small Holding Colonies Act, 1916, (Note: Small Holding Colonies Act 1916 (6 & 7 Geo. 5. c. 38)) and otherwise to amend that Act. (Repealed for England and Wales by Agriculture Act 1970 (c. 40))
Public Works Loans Act 1918 (repealed)	8 & 9 Geo. 5. c. 27	8 August 1918
An Act to grant Money for the purpose of certain Local Loans out of the Local Loans Fund, and for other purposes relating to Local Loans. (Repealed by Public Works Loans Act 1964 (c. 9))
Government War Obligations Act 1918 (repealed)	8 & 9 Geo. 5. c. 28	8 August 1918
An Act to make provision with respect to Obligations incurred by or on behalf of His Majesty's Government for the purpose of the present War or in connection therewith. (Repealed by Statute Law Revision Act 1958 (6 & 7 Eliz. 2. c. 46))
Maternity and Child Welfare Act 1918 (repealed)	8 & 9 Geo. 5. c. 29	8 August 1918
An Act to make further provision for the Health of Mothers and Young Children. (Repealed for England and Wales by Public Health Act 1936 (26 Geo. 5 & 1 Edw. 8. c. 49) and Public Health (London) Act 1936 (26 Geo. 5 & 1 Edw. 8. c. 50), for Scotland by National Health Service (Scotland) Act 1947 (10 & 11 Geo. 6. c. 27) and for Northern Ireland by Statute Law Revision Act (Northern Ireland) 1954 (c. 35 (N.I.)))
Naval Prize Act 1918 (repealed)	8 & 9 Geo. 5. c. 30	8 August 1918
An Act to amend the Law relating to Naval Prize of War. (Repealed by Naval Prize Act 1928 (18 & 19 Geo. 5. c. 36) and Statute Law Revision Act 1953 (2 & 3 Eliz. 2. c. 5))
Trading with the Enemy (Amendment) Act 1918 (repealed)	8 & 9 Geo. 5. c. 31	8 August 1918
An Act to amend the enactments relating to Trading with the Enemy, and to extend temporarily certain of those enactments to the carrying on of banking business after the termination of the present war. (Repealed by Trading with the Enemy Act 1939 (2 & 3 Geo. 6. c. 89))
Trade Boards Act 1918 (repealed)	8 & 9 Geo. 5. c. 32	8 August 1918
An Act to amend the Trade Boards Act, 1909. (Note: Trade Boards Act 1909 (9 Edw. 7. c. 22)) (Repealed by Wages Councils Act 1945 (8 & 9 Geo. 6. c. 17))
Asylums and Certified Institutions (Officers Pensions) Act 1918 (repealed)	8 & 9 Geo. 5. c. 33	8 August 1918
An Act to make further provision for the application of the Asylums Officers Superannuation Act, 1909, (Note: Asylums Officers Superannuation Act 1909 (9 Edw. 7. c. 48)) to officers in certified institutions for defectives, and to provide for the aggregation of service in asylums and in such institutions. (Repealed by SR&O 1947/1755 and National Health Service (Scotland) (Superannuation) Regulations 1948 (SI 1948/412))
Statutory Undertakings (Temporary Increase of Charges) Act 1918 (repealed)	8 & 9 Geo. 5. c. 34	8 August 1918
An Act to enable the statutory provisions affecting the charges which may be made in respect of certain undertakings to be temporarily modified. (Repealed by Statute Law Revision Act 1950 (14 Geo. 6. c. 6))
Public Health (Borrowing Powers) (Ireland) Act 1918 (repealed)	8 & 9 Geo. 5. c. 35	8 August 1918
An Act to extend the borrowing powers of District Councils under the Public Health (Ireland) Acts, 1878 to 1917. (Repealed by Local Government Act (Northern Ireland) 1972 (c. 9 (N.I.)))
Corn Production (Amendment) Act 1918 (repealed)	8 & 9 Geo. 5. c. 36	8 August 1918
An Act to amend subsection (3) of section eleven of the Corn Production Act, 1917. (Note: Corn Production Act 1917 (7 & 8 Geo. 5. c. 46)) (Repealed by Agriculture Act 1920 (10 & 11 Geo. 5. c. 76) and Statute Law Revision Act 1927 (17 & 18 Geo. 5. c. 42))
Consolidated Fund (No. 3) Act 1918 (repealed)	8 & 9 Geo. 5. c. 37	8 August 1918
An Act to apply a sum out of the Consolidated Fund to the service of the year ending on the thirty-first day of March one thousand nine hundred and nineteen. (Repealed by Statute Law Revision Act 1927 (17 & 18 Geo. 5. c. 42))
British Nationality and Status of Aliens Act 1918 (repealed)	8 & 9 Geo. 5. c. 38	8 August 1918
An Act to amend the British Nationality and Status of Aliens Act, 1914. (Note: British Nationality and Status of Aliens Act 1914 (4 & 5 Geo. 5. c. 17)) (Repealed by British Nationality Act 1948 (11 & 12 Geo. 6. c. 56))
Education Act 1918 or the Fisher Act	8 & 9 Geo. 5. c. 39	8 August 1918
An Act to make further provision with respect to Education in England and Wales and for purposes connected therewith.
Income Tax Act 1918 (repealed)	8 & 9 Geo. 5. c. 40	8 August 1918
An Act to Consolidate the Enactments relating to Income Tax. (Repealed by Income Tax Act 1952 (15 & 16 Geo. 6 & 1 Eliz. 2. c. 10))
Isle of Man (Customs) Act 1918	8 & 9 Geo. 5. c. 41	21 November 1918
An Act to amend the Law with respect to Customs in the Isle of Man.
Loans (Incumbents of Benefices) Amendment Act 1918 (repealed)	8 & 9 Geo. 5. c. 42	21 November 1918
An Act to amend the Acts relating to Loans to Incumbents of Benefices by Queen Anne's Bounty. (Repealed by Endowments and Glebe Measure 1976 (No. 4))
Midwives Act 1918 (repealed)	8 & 9 Geo. 5. c. 43	21 November 1918
An Act to amend the Midwives Act, 1902. (Note: Midwives Act 1902 (2 Edw. 7. c. 17)) (Repealed by Midwives Act 1951 (14 & 15 Geo. 6. c. 53))
Special Commission (Belfast Prison) Act 1918 (repealed)	8 & 9 Geo. 5. c. 44	21 November 1918
An Act to constitute a Special Commission to inquire into certain complaints as to the Treatment of Prisoners in Belfast Prison. (Repealed by Statute Law Revision Act 1927 (17 & 18 Geo. 5. c. 42))
Burghs Gas Supply (Scotland) Amendment Act 1918 (repealed)	8 & 9 Geo. 5. c. 45	21 November 1918
An Act to extend the purposes for which the Gas Contingent Guarantee Rate under the Burghs Gas Supply (Scotland) Act, 1876, (Note: Burghs Gas Supply (Scotland) Act 1876 (39 & 40 Vict. c. 49)) may be levied. (Repealed by Gas Act 1948 (11 & 12 Geo. 6. c. 67))
Stockbrokers (Ireland) Act 1918 (repealed)	8 & 9 Geo. 5. c. 46	21 November 1918
An Act to make provision with respect to the Rate of Brokerage or Commission Fees of Licensed Stockbrokers in Ireland on dealings in Government Stocks or Securities. (Repealed by Statute Law Revision Act (Northern Ireland) 1954 (c. 35 (N.I.)))
Parliament (Qualification of Women) Act 1918 or the Eligibility of Women Act 1918	8 & 9 Geo. 5. c. 47	21 November 1918
An Act to amend the Law with respect to the Capacity of Women to sit in Parliament.
Education (Scotland) Act 1918 (repealed)	8 & 9 Geo. 5. c. 48	21 November 1918
An Act to make further provision with respect to Education in Scotland and for purposes connected therewith. (Repealed by Rating (Scotland) Act 1926 (16 & 17 Geo. 5. c. 47), Local Government (Scotland) Act 1929 (19 & 20 Geo. 5. c. 25), Children and Young Persons (Scotland) Act 1932 (22 & 23 Geo. 5. c. 47), Education (Scotland) Act 1945 (8 & 9 Geo. 6. c. 37), Education (Scotland) Act 1946 (9 & 10 Geo. 6. c. 72), Local Government (Scotland) Act 1947 (10 & 11 Geo. 6. c. 43), Statute Law Revision Act 1950 (14 Geo. 6. c. 6) and Education (Scotland) Act 1962 (10 & 11 Eliz. 2. c. 47))
Affiliation Orders (Increase of Maximum Payment) Act 1918 (repealed)	8 & 9 Geo. 5. c. 49	21 November 1918
An Act to increase the weekly sum which under the Bastardy Laws Amendment Act, 1872, (Note: Bastardy Laws Amendment Act 1872 (35 & 36 Vict. c. 65)) may be ordered to be paid by the putative father of a bastard child. (Repealed by Statute Law Revision Act 1927 (17 & 18 Geo. 5. c. 42))
Representation of the People (Amendment) Act 1918 (repealed)	8 & 9 Geo. 5. c. 50	21 November 1918
An Act to extend the maximum period which may be allowed to elapse at elections during the present war and a period of twelve months thereafter between the close of the poll and the counting of the votes, and to exclude from the operation of the Rules Publication Act, 1893, (Note: Rules Publication Act 1893 (56 & 57 Vict. c. 66)) Orders in Council made under the Representation of the People Act, 1918. (Note: Representation of the People Act 1918 (7 & 8 Geo. 5. c. 64)) (Repealed by Representation of the People Act 1948 (11 & 12 Geo. 6. c. 65))
Police (Pensions) Act 1918 (repealed)	8 & 9 Geo. 5. c. 51	21 November 1918
An Act to make further provision with respect to pensions payable to police constables and their widows. (Repealed by Police Pensions Act 1921 (11 & 12 Geo. 5. c. 31) and Police Pensions Act 1948 (11 & 12 Geo. 6. c. 24))
Petroleum (Production) Act 1918 (repealed)	8 & 9 Geo. 5. c. 52	21 November 1918
An Act to make provision with respect to the searching and boring for and getting Petroleum, and for purposes connected therewith. (Repealed for England and Wales and Scotland by Petroleum (Production) Act 1934 (24 & 25 Geo. 5. c. 36) and for Northern Ireland by Petroleum (Production) Act (Northern Ireland) 1964 (c. 28 (N.I.)))
Constabulary and Police (Ireland) Act 1918 (repealed)	8 & 9 Geo. 5. c. 53	21 November 1918
An Act to amend the Law relating to the Pay and Pensions of the Royal Irish Constabulary and Dublin Metropolitan Police and for other purposes in connection with those Forces. (Repealed by Police (Northern Ireland) Act 1998 (c. 32))
Tithe Act 1918 (repealed)	8 & 9 Geo. 5. c. 54	21 November 1918
An Act to amend the Tithe Acts, 1836 to 1891. (Repealed by Statute Law (Repeals) Act 1998 (c. 43))
School Teachers (Superannuation) Act 1918 (repealed)	8 & 9 Geo. 5. c. 55	21 November 1918
An Act to make provision with respect to the grant of Superannuation Allowances to Teachers, and of Gratuities to their legal personal representatives, and to amend the Elementary School Teachers (Superannuation) Acts, 1898 to 1912. (Repealed for England and Wales by Teachers' Superannuation Act 1965 (c. 83) and for the Isle of Man by Statute Law Revision (Isle of Man) Act 1991 (c. 61))
Appropriation Act 1918 (repealed)	8 & 9 Geo. 5. c. 56	21 November 1918
An Act to apply certain sums out of the Consolidated Fund to the service of the years ending on the thirty-first day of March one thousand nine hundred and seventeen and one thousand nine hundred and nineteen, and to appropriate the Supplies granted in this Session of Parliament. (Repealed by Statute Law Revision Act 1927 (17 & 18 Geo. 5. c. 42))
War Pensions (Administrative Provisions) Act 1918	8 & 9 Geo. 5. c. 57	21 November 1918
An Act to make provision for the better administration of the enactments relating to Naval, Military, and Air Force War Pensions, Grants, and Allowances, and for certain other purposes connected with such pensions, grants, and allowances.
Defence of the Realm (Employment Exchanges) Act 1918 (repealed)	8 & 9 Geo. 5. c. 58	21 November 1918
An Act to authorise the taking possession of premises required, in connection with schemes of demobilisation, for Employment Exchanges and other purposes of the Ministry of Labour. (Repealed by Statute Law Revision Act 1927 (17 & 18 Geo. 5. c. 42))
Termination of the Present War (Definition) Act 1918 (repealed)	8 & 9 Geo. 5. c. 59	21 November 1918
An Act to make provision for determining the date of the termination of the present war, and for purposes connected therewith. (Repealed by Statute Law (Repeals) Act 1978 (c. 45))
Ministry of Munitions Act 1918 (repealed)	8 & 9 Geo. 5. c. 60	21 November 1918
An Act to amend the Ministry of Munitions Act, 1915. (Note: Ministry of Munitions Act 1915 (5 & 6 Geo. 5. c. 51)) (Repealed by Statute Law Revision Act 1927 (17 & 18 Geo. 5. c. 42))
Wages (Temporary Regulation) Act 1918 (repealed)	8 & 9 Geo. 5. c. 61	21 November 1918
An Act for prescribing Minimum Rates of Wages during a limited period and for repealing certain provisions of the Munitions of War Acts. (Repealed by Statute Law Revision Act 1927 (17 & 18 Geo. 5. c. 42))

=== Local acts ===
Short title	Citation	Royal assent
Long title
Local Government Board's Provisional Orders Confirmation (No. 1) Act 1918	8 & 9 Geo. 5. c. i	16 May 1918
An Act to confirm certain Provisional Orders of the Local Government Board relating to Carnarvon Halifax and Wallasey.
	Carnarvon Order 1918 Provisional Order for altering the Carnarvon Corporation Act 1897. (Note: Carnarvon Corporation Act 1897 (60 & 61 Vict. c. cix))	
	Halifax Order 1918 Provisional Order for altering the Halifax Improvement Act 1853 (Note: Halifax Improvement Act 1853 (16 & 17 Vict. c. clxvii)) and a Confirming Act. (Note: Local Government Board's Provisional Orders Confirmation (No. 9) Act. 1892 (55 & 56 Vict. c. cc))	
	Wallasey Order 1918 Provisional Order for altering the Wallasey Improvement Act 1867. (Note: Wallasey Improvement Act 1867 (30 & 31 Vict. c.cxxxii))	
Land Drainage (Lotting Fen) Provisional Order Confirmation Act 1918	8 & 9 Geo. 5. c. ii	16 May 1918
An Act to confirm a Provisional Order under the Land Drainage Act 1914 (Note: Land Drainage Act 1914 (5 & 6 Geo. 5. c. 4)) relating to Lotting Fen in the County of Huntingdon.
	Lotting Fen Provisional Order 1918 Land Drainage (Lotting Fen) Provisional Order.	
Nitrate Railways Company Act 1918	8 & 9 Geo. 5. c. iii	16 May 1918
An Act to amend the Nitrate Railways Company Limited (Conversion of Shares) Act 1891 (Note: Nitrate Railways Company Limited (Conversion of Shares) Act 1891 (54 & 55 Vict. c. xv)) and the Nitrate Railways Company Limited Act 1901 (Note: Nitrate Railways Company Limited Act 1901 (1 Edw. 7. c. lv)) and for other purposes.
Westgate on Sea Congregational Chapel Charity Scheme Confirmation Act 1918	8 & 9 Geo. 5. c. iv	27 June 1918
An Act to confirm a Scheme of the Charity Commissioners for the application or management of the Charity consisting of the Congregational Chapel and Trust Property in the Parish of Westgate on Sea in the County of Kent.
	Scheme for the Application or Management of the Charity consisting of the Congregational Chapel and Trust Property in the Parish of Westgate-on-Sea in the County of Kent comprised in an Indenture dated 26th November 1883.	
Provisional Order (Marriages) Confirmation Act 1918 (repealed)	8 & 9 Geo. 5. c. v	27 June 1918
An Act to confirm a Provisional Order made by one of His Majesty's Principal Secretaries of State under the Provisional Order (Marriages) Act 1905. (Note: Provisional Order (Marriages) Act 1905 (5 Edw. 7. c. 23)) (Repealed by Statute Law (Repeals) Act 1977 (c. 18))
	Saint Catherine Neasden Order.	
Motherwell Water (Supplementary Supply) Order Confirmation Act 1918	8 & 9 Geo. 5. c. vi	27 June 1918
An Act to confirm a Provisional Order under the Private Legislation Procedure (Scotland) Act 1899 (Note: Private Legislation Procedure (Scotland) Act 1899 (62 & 63 Vict. c. 47)) relating to Motherwell Water (Supplementary Supply).
	Motherwell Water (Supplementary Supply) Order 1918 Provisional Order to authorise the Town Council of the Burgh of Motherwell to provide a supplementary water supply to acquire lands and to construct and maintain additional works and for other purposes.	
Brixham Gas and Electricity Act 1918	8 & 9 Geo. 5. c. vii	27 June 1918
An Act to confer further powers upon the Brixham Gas Company and to authorise the Company to raise additional capital and for other purposes.
Yorkshire Electric Power Act 1918 (repealed)	8 & 9 Geo. 5. c. viii	27 June 1918
An Act to confer further powers on the Yorkshire Electric Power Company and to make further provisions with respect to the supply of electrical energy in the area of that Company. (Repealed by Statute Law (Repeals) Act 1989 (c. 43))
Harrod's Stores Limited Act 1918	8 & 9 Geo. 5. c. ix	27 June 1918
An Act for enabling Harrod's Stores Limited to re-arrange its capital and to provide for the extinction of its founders' shares and for issuing fully paid ordinary shares in lieu thereof and for altering the memorandum and articles of association of the Company and to increase its capital and for enabling Harrod's Stores Founders' Shares Company Limited to pay to its directors compensation for loss of office as directors of that company and for other purposes.
Pontypool Gas and Water Act 1918	8 & 9 Geo. 5. c. x	27 June 1918
An Act to confer further powers on the Pontypool Gas and Water Company and for other purposes.
Red Cross and Order of St. John Act 1918	8 & 9 Geo. 5. c. xi	27 June 1918
An Act to enable the British Red Cross Society and the Grand Priory of the Order of the Hospital of Saint John of Jerusalem in England to apply to the public advantage the residue of their property acquired for the purposes of the present war and for other purposes.
Chepstow Gas Act 1918	8 & 9 Geo. 5. c. xii	27 June 1918
An Act to authorise the Chepstow Gas and Coke Consumers Company to raise additional capital to extend the limits of supply and to change the name of the Company and for other purposes.
Aldershot Gas, Water and District Lighting Act 1918	8 & 9 Geo. 5. c. xiii	30 July 1918
An Act to confer further powers on the Aldershot Gas Water and District Lighting Company.
Railway Passengers Assurance (Consolidation) Act 1918	8 & 9 Geo. 5. c. xiv	30 July 1918
An Act to consolidate the Acts relating to the Railway Passengers Assurance Company to and extend the objects and business of the Company and to make new provisions for the government of the Company and the management of its affairs and for other purposes.
Pontypridd and Rhondda Water Act 1918	8 & 9 Geo. 5. c. xv	30 July 1918
An Act to extend the periods limited by the Pontypridd and Rhondda Water Act 1913 (Note: Pontypridd and Rhondda Water Act 1913 (3 & 4 Geo. 5. c. lxviii)) for the purchase of lands and construction of works and to revive powers for purchase of lands.
West Bromwich Corporation Act 1918 (repealed)	8 & 9 Geo. 5. c. xvi	30 July 1918
An Act to authorise the mayor aldermen and burgesses of the borough of West Bromwich to alter the wards thereof to increase the number of aldermen and councillors and for other purposes. (Repealed by West Bromwich Corporation Act 1969 (c. lix))
London County Council (Money) Act 1918 (repealed)	8 & 9 Geo. 5. c. xvii	30 July 1918
An Act to regulate the expenditure on capital account and lending of money by the London County Council during the financial period from the first day of April one thousand nine hundred and eighteen to the thirtieth day of September one thousand nine hundred and nineteen and for other purposes. (Repealed by London County Council (Loans) Act 1955 (4 & 5 Eliz. 2. c. xxvi))
Belfast Harbour Act 1918	8 & 9 Geo. 5. c. xviii	30 July 1918
An Act to authorise the construction of additional docks and other works at Belfast to extend the powers of the Belfast Harbour Commissioners and for other purposes.
British Gas Light Company (Norwich) Act 1918	8 & 9 Geo. 5. c. xix	30 July 1918
An Act for empowering the British Gas Light Company Limited to expend further capital and to extend their works at Norwich to extend their limits of supply and for other purposes.
Morecambe Corporation Act 1918	8 & 9 Geo. 5. c. xx	30 July 1918
An Act to authorise the Corporation of Morecambe to provide and work motor omnibuses and for other purposes.
Londonderry Corporation Act 1918	8 & 9 Geo. 5. c. xxi	30 July 1918
An Act to authorise the mayor aldermen and burgesses of the city of Londonderry to acquire additional sources of water supply and to construct additional waterworks to make a street improvement to provide and run trolley vehicles and omnibuses and to confer further powers on them with respect to the supply of water and electricity and to make further provision for the improvement health and local government of the city and for other purposes.
County of London Electric Supply Company's Act 1918	8 & 9 Geo. 5. c. xxii	30 July 1918
An Act to extend the powers of the County of London Electric Supply Company Limited with reference to the user of certain lands and the payment of interest out of capital and for other purposes.
Sligo Corporation Act 1918	8 & 9 Geo. 5. c. xxiii	30 July 1918
An Act to amend the provisions for the local management of the borough of Silgo and to extend the rating powers of the Corporation of the borough and to extend the power of the Corporation to borrow and re-borrow moneys and to provide for the payment by the Corporation of the expenses incurred in meeting the demands of the county council of the county of Sligo and to confer on the Local Government Board for Ireland further powers of control in regard to the performance of their respective duties by the Corporation and the officers thereof and to amend the provisions relating to the election and duration in office of the aldermen and councillors of the borough and for other purposes.
Nelson Corporation Water Act 1918	8 & 9 Geo. 5. c. xxiv	30 July 1918
An Act to empower the mayor aldermen and burgesses of the borough of Nelson to construct additional waterworks to make further provision in regard to their water undertaking and for other purposes.
Glasgow Corporation Order Confirmation Act 1918 (repealed)	8 & 9 Geo. 5. c. xxv	30 July 1918
An Act to confirm a Provisional Order under the Private Legislation Procedure (Scotland) Act 1899 relating to Glasgow Corporation. (Repealed by Glasgow Corporation Consolidation (Water, Transport and Markets) Order Confirmation Act 1964 (c. xliii))
	Glasgow Corporation Order 1918 Provisional Order to confer further powers on the Corporation of the City of Glasgow with respect to farmed-out houses to authorise the Corporation to borrow further money for the purposes of the Glasgow Markets Acts 1865 to 1914 and to charge new and increased rates tolls and rents for slaughter-houses and markets and for other purposes.	
Land Drainage (Pinchbeck) Provisional Orders Confirmation Act 1918 (repealed)	8 & 9 Geo. 5. c. xxvi	30 July 1918
An Act to confirm Provisional Orders under the Land Drainage Act 1861 (Note: Land Drainage Act 1861 (24 & 25 Vict. c. 133)) in the matter of proposed Drainage Districts in the Parish of Pinchbeck in the Holland Division of the County of Lincoln. (Repealed by Statute Law (Repeals) Act 1993 (c. 50))
	Land Drainage (Pinchbeck (Leaves Lakes)) Order 1918 In the matter of a proposed Drainage District in the Parish of Pinchbeck in the Holland Division of the County of Lincoln.	
	Land Drainage (Pinchbeck (Star Lode)) Order 1918 In the matter of a proposed Drainage District in the Parish of Pinchbeck in the Holland Division of the County of Lincoln.	
Land Drainage (Woodwalton) Provisional Order Confirmation Act 1918	8 & 9 Geo. 5. c. xxvii	30 July 1918
An Act to confirm a Provisional Order under the Land Drainage Act 1861 in the matter of a proposed Drainage District in the Parishes of Ramsey and Woodwalton in the county of Huntingdon.
	Woodwalton Order 1918 In the matter of a proposed drainage district in the parishes of Ramsey and Woodwalton in the county of Huntingdon.	
Local Government Board (Ireland) Provisional Orders Confirmation (No. 1) Act 1918	8 & 9 Geo. 5. c. xxviii	30 July 1918
An Act to confirm certain Provisional Orders of the Local Government Board for Ireland relating to Cork Lurgan and Tralee.
	Cork County Borough Order 1918 Provisional Order to alter and amend the Cork Improvement Act 1868. (Note: Cork Improvement Act 1868 (31 & 32 Vict. c. xxxiii))	
	Lurgan Gas Order 1918 Provisional Order to alter and amend the Lurgan Urban District Council Act 1915. (Note: Lurgan Urban District Council Act 1915 (5 & 6 Geo. 5. c. liv))	
	Castleisland Waterworks Order 1918 Provisional Order to enable the Council of the Rural District of Tralee to put in force the Compulsory Clauses of the Lands Clauses Acts.	
Local Government Board (Ireland) Provisional Order Confirmation (No. 2) Act 1918	8 & 9 Geo. 5. c. xxix	30 July 1918
An Act to confirm a Provisional Order of the Local Government Board for Ireland relating to the County Borough of Limerick.
	Limerick Corporation Gas Order 1918 Provisional Order to alter and amend the Limerick Corporation Gas Act 1878. (Note: Limerick Corporation Gas Act 1878 (41 & 42 Vict. c. clx))	
Electric Lighting Orders Confirmation Act 1918	8 & 9 Geo. 5. c. xxx	30 July 1918
An Act to confirm certain Provisional Orders made by the Board of Trade under the Electric Lighting Acts 1882 to 1909 relating to Newquay (Amendment) and Wednesbury (Amendment).
	Newquay Electric Lighting Order 1918 Provisional Order granted by the Board of Trade under the Electric Lighting Acts 1882 to 1909 to the Newquay Electric Light and Power Company Limited in respect of the urban district of Newquay in the county of Cornwall.	
	Wednesbury Electric Supply (Transfer) Order 1918 Provisional Order granted by the Board of Trade under the Electric Lighting Acts 1882 to 1909 to the mayor aldermen and burgesses of the borough of Wednesbury for the amendment of the Wednesbury Electric Supply Order 1899.	
Pier and Harbour Orders Confirmation Act 1918	8 & 9 Geo. 5. c. xxxi	30 July 1918
An Act to confirm certain Provisional Orders made by the Board of Trade under the General Pier and Harbour Act 1861 (Note: General Pier and Harbour Act 1861 (24 & 25 Vict. c. 45)) relating to Bridport Sandown Scarborough and Shoreham.
	Bridport Harbour Order 1918 Order to reconstitute the Bridport Harbour Commissioners and to authorise the raising of Moneys for the Repair and Maintenance of the Harbour of Bridport in the County of Dorset.	
	Sandown Pier Order 1918 Order for the transfer of the Sandown Pier to the Urban District Council of Sandown and for conferring further powers on that Council.	
	Scarborough Harbour Order 1918 Order to amend the Acts relating to the Scarborough Harbour in regard to the calling of meetings of the Commissioners increase of dues rates and charges and the borrowing of money and for other purposes.	
	New Shoreham Harbour Order 1918 Order for conferring powers on the Shoreham Harbour Trustees to borrow money for the purposes of the maintenance improvement and management of the harbour and on local authorities to lend money to the Trustees and for other purposes.	
Glasgow and South Western Railway Order Confirmation Act 1918	8 & 9 Geo. 5. c. xxxii	30 July 1918
An Act to confirm a Provisional Order under the Private Legislation Procedure (Scotland) Act 1899 relating to the Glasgow and South Western Railway.
	Glasgow and South Western Railway Order 1918 Provisional Order for conferring further powers on the Glasgow and South Western Railway Company for the construction of a widening and works and the acquisition of lands the raising of additional capital and for other purposes.	
Local Government Board's Provisional Orders Confirmation (No. 4) Act 1918	8 & 9 Geo. 5. c. xxxiii	8 August 1918
An Act to confirm certain Provisional Orders of the Local Government Board relating to Batley Bognor Lancaster Shrewsbury and Todmorden (Rural).
	Batley Order 1918 Provisional Order for altering the Batley Corporation Waterworks Act 1871 (Note: Batley Corporation Waterworks Act 1871 (34 & 35 Vict. c. xl)) and the Batley Corporation Waterworks Act 1878. (Note: Batley Corporation Waterworks Act 1878 (41 & 42 Vict. c. xxvii))	
	Bognor Order 1918 Provisional Order for altering the Local Act 5 & 6 Wm. IV cap. ci. (Note: Bognor Improvement Act 1835 (5 & 6 Will. 4. c. ci))	
	Lancaster Order 1918 Provisional Order for altering the Lancaster Corporation Act 1900 (Note: Lancaster Corporation Act 1900 (63 & 64 Vict. c. ccxxxvi)) and the Local Government Board's Provisional Order Confirmation (No. 6) Act 1916. (Note: Local Government Board's Provisional Order Confirmation (No. 6) Act 1916 (6 & 7 Geo. 5. c. xxx))	
	Shrewsbury Order 1918 Provisional Order for partially repealing and altering the Shrewsbury Improvement Act 1855. (Note: Shrewsbury Improvement Act 1855 (18 & 19 Vict. c. clxxviii))	
	Todmorden Rural Order 1918 Provisional Order to enable the Rural District Council of Todmorden to put in force the Compulsory Clauses of the Lands Clauses Acts.	
Local Government Board's Provisional Order Confirmation (No. 5) Act 1918 (repealed)	8 & 9 Geo. 5. c. xxxiv	8 August 1918
An Act to confirm a Provisional Order of the Local Government Board relating to Kendal. (Repealed by Cumbria Act 1982 (c. xv))
	Kendal (Extension) Order 1918 Provisional Order made in pursuance of the Local Government Act 1888 (Note: Local Government Act 1888 (51 & 52 Vict. c. 41)) for extending a Borough.	
Local Government Board's Provisional Order Confirmation (No. 6) Act 1918	8 & 9 Geo. 5. c. xxxv	8 August 1918
An Act to confirm a Provisional Order of the Local Government Board relating to Swansea.
	Swansea (Extension) Order 1918 Provisional Order made in pursuance of the Local Government Act 1888 for extending a County Borough.	
Rothesay Tramways (Amendment) Order Confirmation Act 1918	8 & 9 Geo. 5. c. xxxvi	8 August 1918
An Act to confirm a Provisional Order under the Private Legislation Procedure (Scotland) Act 1899 relating to Rothesay Tramways.
	Rothesay Tramways (Amendment) Order 1918 Provisional Order amending the Rothesay Tramways Orders 1880 to 1902.	
Rotherham Corporation Act 1918	8 & 9 Geo. 5. c. xxxvii	8 August 1918
An Act to provide for the transfer of the electricity undertakings of the Mexborough and Swinton Tramways Com- pany to the mayor aldermen and burgesses of the county borough of Rotherham to extend the area for the supply of electricity by the said mayor aldermen and burgesses to make further provision in regard to their electricity gas and water undertakings and for other purposes.
Maidenhead Gas Act 1918	8 & 9 Geo. 5. c. xxxviii	8 August 1918
An Act to authorise the Maidenhead Gas Company to raise additional capital to confer further powers upon the Company and for other purposes.
Saint Olave's Southwark Church Act 1918	8 & 9 Geo. 5. c. xxxix	8 August 1918
An Act to authorise the closing of the church of Saint Olave Southwark and the sale of part of the site and churchyard thereof and the Saint Olave's Rectory the extinction of the ecclesiastical parish of Saint Olave Southwark and the merger thereof in other parishes and for other purposes.
Wandsworth, Wimbledon and Epsom District Gas Act 1918	8 & 9 Geo. 5. c. xl	8 August 1918
An Act to confer further powers upon the Wandsworth Wimbledon and Epsom District Gas Company and for other purposes.
West Sussex County Council (Bridges) Act 1918	8 & 9 Geo. 5. c. xli	8 August 1918
An Act to empower the West Sussex County Council to construct a new bridge and approaches across the River Adur at Shoreham-by-Sea and to transfer to the said County Council the rape bridges in the county of West Sussex and for other purposes.
Bristol Corporation Act 1918	8 & 9 Geo. 5. c. xlii	8 August 1918
An Act to empower the lord mayor aldermen and burgesses of the city of Bristol to construct additional dock works to extend the city and county of Bristol and for other purposes.
Shropshire Worcestershire and Staffordshire Electric Power Act 1918 (repealed)	8 & 9 Geo. 5. c. xliii	8 August 1918
An Act to confer further powers upon the Shropshire, Worcestershire and Staffordshire Electric Power Company and for other purposes. (Repealed by Shropshire, Worcestershire and Staffordshire Electric Power (Consolidation) Act 1938 (1 & 2 Geo. 6. c. lviii))
Local Government Board's Provisional Orders Confirmation (No. 2) Act 1918	8 & 9 Geo. 5. c. xliv	21 November 1918
An Act to confirm certain Provisional Orders of the Local Government Board relating to Birkenhead Matlock Bath and Scarthin Nick Newton in Mackerfield Rawmarsh and Swansea and the East Dean and United Districts and the Isle of Wight Joint Hospital Districts.
	Birkenhead Order 1918 Provisional Order for altering the Birkenhead Corporation Water Act 1907. (Note: Birkenhead Corporation Water Act 1907 (7 Edw. 7. c. cxxxi))	
	Matlock Bath Order 1918 Provisional Order for altering the Matlock Bath Gas Act 1896. (Note: Matlock Bath Gas Act 1896 (59 & 60 Vict. c. cxxiii))	
	Newton in Mackerfield Order 1918 Provisional Order for partially repealing and altering the Newton District Improvement Act 1855 (Note: Newton District Improvement Act 1855 (18 & 19 Vict. c. c)) and certain Confirming Acts.	
	Rawmarsh Order 1918 Provisional Order for partially repealing and altering the Rawmarsh Local Board Act 1879. (Note: Rawmarsh Local Board Act 1879 (42 & 43 Vict. c. li))	
	Swansea Order 1918 Provisional Order for altering the Swansea (Corporation) Water Act 1884. (Note: Swansea (Corporation) Water Act 1884 (47 & 48 Vict. c. clxxiv))	
	East Dean and United Districts Joint Hospital Order 1918 Provisional Order for altering the Local Government Board's Provisional Orders Confirmation (No. 2) Act 1911. (Note: Local Government Board's Provisional Orders Confirmation (No. 2) Act 1911 (1 & 2 Geo. 5. c. cxli))	
	Isle of Wight Joint Hospital Order 1918 Provisional Order for altering the Local Government Board's Provisional Orders Confirmation (No. 5) Act 1909. (Note: Local Government Board's Provisional Orders Confirmation (No. 5) Act 1909 (9 Edw. 7. c. cxxi))	
Local Government Board's Provisional Orders Confirmation (No. 3) Act 1918	8 & 9 Geo. 5. c. xlv	21 November 1918
An Act to confirm certain Provisional Orders of the Local Government Board relating to Ashford Bradford Gainsborough Shipley and Sidmouth.
	Ashford Order 1918 Provisional Order for partially repealing and altering the Ashford Urban District Gas Act 1897. (Note: Ashford Urban District Gas Act 1897 (60 & 61 Vict. c. lii))	
	Bradford Order 1918 Provisional Order for altering the Bradford Corporation Act 1913. (Note: Bradford Corporation Act 1913 (3 & 4 Geo. 5. c. xcvi))	
	Gainsborough Order 1918 Provisional Order for altering the Gainsborough Urban District Council (Gas) Act 1899. (Note: Gainsborough Urban District Council (Gas) Act 1899 (62 & 63 Vict. c. lxxiv))	
	Shipley Order 1918 Provisional Order for altering certain Local Acts and a Confirming Act. (Note: Local Government Board's Provisional Orders Confirmation (No. 8) Act 1884 (47 & 48 Vict. c. ccxv))	
	Sidmouth Order 1918 Provisional Order for altering the Sidmouth Urban District Council Act 1912. (Note: Sidmouth Urban District Council Act 1912 (2 & 3 Geo. 5. c. viii))	
Local Government Board's Provisional Order Confirmation (No. 7) Act 1918 (repealed)	8 & 9 Geo. 5. c. xlvi	21 November 1918
An Act to confirm a Provisional Order of the Local Government Board relating to Birmingham. (Repealed by West Midlands County Council Act 1980 (c. xi))
	Birmingham Order 1918 Provisional Order made in pursuance of Sections 59 and 87 of the Local Government Act 1888 for altering the Birmingham (Extension) Order 1911.	
Local Government Board's Provisional Orders Confirmation (No. 8) Act 1918	8 & 9 Geo. 5. c. xlvii	21 November 1918
An Act to confirm Provisional Orders of the Local Government Board relating to Blackpool and Southport.
	Blackpool Order 1918	
	Southport (Rating) Order 1918	
Clyde Valley Electrical Power Order Confirmation Act 1918 (repealed)	8 & 9 Geo. 5. c. xlviii	21 November 1918
An Act to confirm a Provisional Order under the Private Legislation Procedure (Scotland) Act 1899 relating to Clyde Valley Electrical Power Company. (Repealed by South of Scotland Electricity Order Confirmation Act 1956 (4 & 5 Eliz. 2. c. xciv))
	Clyde Valley Electrical Power Order 1918 Provisional Order to authorise the Clyde Valley Electrical Power Order Company to raise additional capital and for other purposes.	
Cowdenbeath Water Order Confirmation Act 1918	8 & 9 Geo. 5. c. xlix	21 November 1918
An Act to confirm a Provisional Order under the Private Legislation Procedure (Scotland) Act 1899 relating to Cowdenbeath Water.
	Cowdenbeath Water Order 1918 Provisional Order to transfer to and vest in the Provost Magistrates and Councillors of the Burgh of Cowdenbeath certain waterworks constructed by the Dunfermline District Committee of the County Council of the County of Fife under the Kelty Water Order Confirmation Act 1896 (Note: Kelty Water Order Confirmation Act 1896 (59 & 60 Vict. c. xcix)) to authorise the Town Council to construct and maintain additional waterworks and for other purposes.	
Dunfermline District Water Order Confirmation Act 1918 (repealed)	8 & 9 Geo. 5. c. l	21 November 1918
An Act to confirm a Provisional Order under the Private Legislation Procedure (Scotland) Act 1899 relating to Dunfermline District Water. (Repealed by Statute Law (Repeals) Act 1986 (c. 12))
	Dunfermline District Water Order 1918 Provisional Order to confer further powers on the Dunfermline District Committee of the County Council of the County of Fife and the County Council of the County of Fife in relation to their Water Undertaking under the Dunfermline District Water Orders 1904 and 1913 and for other purposes.	
Gas Orders Confirmation Act 1918	8 & 9 Geo. 5. c. li	21 November 1918
An Act to confirm certain Provisional Orders made by the Board of Trade under the Gas and Water Works Facilities Act 1870 (Note: Gas and Water Works Facilities Act 1870 (33 & 34 Vict. c. 70)) relating to Arlesey Gas Sheffield Gas and Trowbridge Gas.
	Arlesey Gas Order 1918 Order empowering the Arlesey Gas Company to extend their limits of supply and to raise additional capital and for other purposes.	
	Sheffield Gas Order 1918 Order authorising the Sheffield Gas Company to construct additional gasworks and acquire additional lands and making further provision as to the supply of coke oven gas by them.	
	Trowbridge Gas Order 1918 Order empowering the British Gas Light Company Limited to expend additional capital on the Trowbridge undertaking of the Company.	
Gas and Water Orders Confirmation Act 1918	8 & 9 Geo. 5. c. lii	21 November 1918
An Act to confirm certain Provisional Orders made by the Board of Trade under the Gas and Water Works Facilities Act 1870 relating to Llandrindod Wells Gas Hoylake and West Kirby Water North Warwickshire Water and Wey Valley Water.
	Llandrindod Wells Gas Order 1918 Order conferring further powers upon the Llandrindod Wells Gas Company.	
	Hoylake and West Kirby Water Order 1918 Order altering temporarily the rates and charges for the supply of water by the Hoylake and West Kirby Gas and Water Company Limited for domestic and sanitary purposes.	
	North Warwickshire Water Order 1918 Order conferring further powers upon the North Warwickshire Water Company.	
	Wey Valley Water Order 1918 Order empowering the Wey Valley Water Company to extend their limits of supply to raise additional capital and for other purposes.	
Portsea Gas Act 1918	8 & 9 Geo. 5. c. liii	21 November 1918
An Act to confer further powers upon the Portsea Island Gas Light Company.
Gas Light and Coke Company's Act 1918	8 & 9 Geo. 5. c. liv	21 November 1918
An Act to confer further powers upon the Gas Light and Coke Company.
South Metropolitan Gas Act 1918	8 & 9 Geo. 5. c. lv	21 November 1918
An Act to authorise the South Metropolitan Gas Company to raise additional capital and for other purposes.
London United Tramways Act 1918	8 & 9 Geo. 5. c. lvi	21 November 1918
An Act to confer various powers upon the London United Tramways Limited and for other purposes.
Ipswich Dock Act 1918	8 & 9 Geo. 5. c. lvii	21 November 1918
An Act to authorise the Ipswich Dock Commission to construct additional works to alter the tonnage duties and the rates on goods which may be levied by them and for other purposes.
Londonderry and Lough Swilly Railway Act 1918	8 & 9 Geo. 5. c. lviii	21 November 1918
An Act to authorise the Londonderry and Lough Swilly Railway Company to make a railway and works at Londonderry and for other purposes.
Commercial Gas Act 1918	8 & 9 Geo. 5. c. lix	21 November 1918
An Act to authorise the Commercial Gas Company to raise additional capital and for other purposes.
Lancaster Corporation Act 1918	8 & 9 Geo. 5. c. lx	21 November 1918
An Act to confer further powers upon the mayor aldermen and burgesses of the borough of Lancaster with reference to their waterworks undertaking the construction of street improvements and the local government of the said borough and for other purposes.
Sheffield Corporation (Consolidation) Act 1918	8 & 9 Geo. 5. c. lxi	21 November 1918
An Act to consolidate with amendments the Local Acts in force within and to alter the boundaries of the City of Sheffield to make provision in regard to the various undertakings of the Corporation to make better provision for the health and local government of the city and for other purposes.
South Suburban Gas Act 1918 (repealed)	8 & 9 Geo. 5. c. lxii	21 November 1918
An Act to authorise the acquisition by the South Suburban Gas Company of the undertaking of the Dartford Gas Company to confer further powers on the South Suburban Gas Company and for other purposes. (Repealed by South Suburban Gas Act 1928 (18 & 19 Geo. 5. c. lxxx))

=== Private and personal acts ===
Short title	Citation	Royal assent
Long title
Calthorpe Estate Act 1918	8 & 9 Geo. 5. c. 1 Pr.	30 July 1918
An Act to extend the powers of leasing over an Estate situate in or near Edgbaston in the City of Birmingham and other Estates comprised in or subject to the uses or trusts of a Resettlement made by the late Right Honourable Augustus Cholmondeley Baron Calthorpe.
Hamilton Estates Act 1918	8 & 9 Geo. 5. c. 2 Pr.	30 July 1918
An Act to provide for the division of the Testamentary Trusts of the late William Alexander Louis Stephen Duke of Hamilton Brandon and Chatelherault into two separate Trusts and for other purposes.
Scarisbrick Settlement Act 1918	8 & 9 Geo. 5. c. 3 Pr.	30 July 1918
An Act to confirm a Resettlement dated the twenty-first day of December on thousand nine hundred and seventeen of the Family Estates of Sir Charles Scarisbrick Knight and for other purposes.
Smith Estate Act 1918	8 & 9 Geo. 5. c. 4 Pr.	21 November 1918
An Act to confirm upon the trustees of the will and codicils of the late John Graham Smith deceased further powers for the management development and improvement of the estates subject to the trusts of such will and codicils and to extend the time for the exercise of the powers of such trustees and for other purposes.
Miles Divorce Act 1918 (Note: This act was not printed by the King's Printer)	8 & 9 Geo. 5. c. 5 Pr.	30 July 1918
An Act to dissolve the marriage of Margaret Emma Miles with Thomas Nash Miles her now husband and to enable her to marry again and for other purposes.

=== Sources ===
- 8 & 9 George V - 1918 – via HathiTrust.

== See also ==
- List of acts of the Parliament of the United Kingdom
