= Animal Health and Welfare Act 1984 =

Act of the Parliament of the United Kingdom

Animal Health and Welfare Act 1984 (Note: Section 17(1).)
- Act of Parliament
- Parliament of the United Kingdom
- Long title: An Act to amend the provisions of the Animal Health Act 1981 relating to the seizure of things for the purpose of preventing the spread of disease, to powers of entry and declarations as to places infected with a disease and to enable certain orders under that Act to operate in or over territorial waters; to amend the Slaughter of Poultry Act 1967; to enable provision to be made for controlling the practice of artificial breeding of livestock; to repeal the Improvement of Live Stock (Licensing of Bulls) Act 1931 and the Horse Breeding Act 1958; to amend the Medicines Act 1968 in relation to feeding stuffs and veterinary drugs; and for connected purposes.
- Citation: 1984 c. 40
- Territorial extent: England and Wales; Scotland; Northern Ireland (in part); (Note: Section 17(4).)

Dates
- Royal assent: 12 July 1984
- Commencement: 12 October 1984 (in part) (Note: Section 17(2).); 16 August 1985 (in part) (Note: Section 17(3). The Animal Health and Welfare Act 1984 (Commencement No. 1) Order 1985.); 1 January 1986 (rest of act)
Other legislation
Amends	Medicines Act 1968; Animal Health Act 1981
Repeals/revokes	Improvement of Live Stock (Licensing of Bulls) Act 1931; Horse Breeding Act 1958
Amended by	Channel Tunnel (Amendment of Agriculture, Fisheries and Food Import Legislation) Order 1990; Statute Law (Repeals) Act 1993; Welfare of Animals (Slaughter or Killing) Regulations 1995; Statute Law (Repeals) Act 2004; Welfare of Animals at the Time of Killing (Scotland) Regulations 2012

Status: Amended

Text of statute as originally enacted

Revised text of statute as amended

Text of the Animal Health and Welfare Act 1984 as in force today (including any amendments) within the United Kingdom, from legislation.gov.uk.

Animal Health and Welfare Act 1984

The Animal Health and Welfare Act 1984 (c. 40) is an act of the Parliament of the United Kingdom that amended the provisions of the Animal Health Act 1981 related to

- the seizure of things for the purpose of preventing the spread of disease,
- powers of entry upon private premises,
- declarations as to places infected with a disease,
- to enable certain orders under that Act to operate in or over territorial waters,
- to amend the Slaughter of Poultry Act 1967,
- to enable provision to be made for controlling the practice of artificial breeding of livestock,
- to repeal the Improvement of Live Stock (Licensing of Bulls) Act 1931 and the Horse Breeding Act 1958,
- to amend the Medicines Act 1968 in relation to feeding stuffs and veterinary drugs, the registers of which are kept by the Pharmaceutical Society of Great Britain

The Criminal Justice Act 2003 increased the penalties related to the artificial breeding of livestock to 51 weeks from the 3 months stated in this 1984 Act.
