= Contagious Diseases (Animals) Act 1878 =

Act of the Parliament of the United Kingdom

Contagious Diseases (Animals) Act 1878 (Note: Section 1.)
- Act of Parliament
- Parliament of the United Kingdom
- Long title: An Act for making better provision respecting Contagious and Infectious Diseases of Cattle and other Animals; and for other purposes.
- Citation: 41 & 42 Vict. c. 74
- Territorial extent: United Kingdom

Dates
- Royal assent: 16 August 1878
- Commencement: 30 September 1878, except as otherwise expressed (Note: Section 2(1).)
- Repealed: England and Wales and Scotland: Northern Ireland:
Other legislation
Amends	Contagious Diseases (Animals) Act 1869
Repeals/revokes	Cattle Disease (Ireland) Amendment Act 1870
Amended by	Statute Law Revision Act 1883; Contagious Diseases (Animals) Act 1884; Summary Jurisdiction Act 1884; Contagious Diseases (Animals) Transfer of Parts of Districts Act 1884; Contagious Diseases (Animals) Act 1886; Contagious Diseases (Animals) (Pleuro-pneumonia) Act 1890; Public Health (London) Act 1891; Contagious Diseases (Animals) Act 1892; Contagious Diseases (Animals) Act 1893; Diseases of Animals Act 1894; Milk and Dairies (Consolidation) Act 1915
Repealed by	England and Wales and Scotland: Public Health (London) Act 1891, Diseases of Animals Act 1894, Milk and Dairies (Scotland) Act 1914 and Milk and Dairies (Consolidation) Act 1915; Northern Ireland: Food and Drugs Act (Northern Ireland) 1958

Status: Repealed

Text of statute as originally enacted

The Contagious Diseases (Animals) Act 1878 (41 & 42 Vict. c. 74) was an act of the Parliament of the United Kingdom passed by Benjamin Disraeli's Conservative government.

A select committee was appointed in 1877 to investigate animal diseases. The resulting act established central rather than local control over all outbreaks of animal disease.

The agriculturist Jacob Wilson considered the act "an undoubted benefit conferred upon the agricultural interest by the Conservative Government". It was opposed by the Radicals.

== Provisions ==
=== Repealed enactments ===
Section 4(1) of the act repealed 10 enactments, listed in the first schedule to the act.

Citation	Short title	Description	Extent of Repeal
32 & 33 Vict. c. 70	Contagious Diseases (Animals) Act 1869	The Contagious Diseases (Animals) Act, 1869	In part, namely:— (i.) Paragraphs 2, 3, and 4 of section 28 (local), relating to the markets of the mayor, aldermen, and commons of the City of London, with the Fifth Schedule, referred to in that section. (ii.) Sections 100 and 101 (transitory), relating to money borrowed by local authorities before the passing of that Act.
38 & 39 Vict. c. 75	Contagious Diseases (Animals) (Scotland) Act 1875	An Act to amend the Contagious Diseases (Animals) Act, 1869	The whole act.
11 & 12 Vict. c. 105	Importation of Sheep Act 1848	An Act to prohibit the importation of sheep, cattle, or other animals, for the purpose of preventing the introduction of contagious or infectious disorders	The whole act.
11 & 12 Vict. c. 107	Contagious Disorders (Sheep), etc. Act 1848	An Act to prevent, until the first day of September, one thousand eight hundred and fifty, and to the end of the then session of Parliament, the spreading of contagious or infectious disorders among sheep, cattle, and other animals	The whole act.
16 & 17 Vict. c. 62	Contagious Diseases (Animals) Act 1853	An Act to extend and continue an Act of the twelfth year of Her present Majesty, to prevent the spreading of contagious or infectious disorders among sheep, cattle, and other animals	The whole act.
29 & 30 Vict. c. 4	Cattle Disease Act (Ireland) 1866	The Cattle Disease Act (Ireland), 1866	The whole act.
33 & 34 Vict. c. 36	Cattle Disease (Ireland) Amendment Act 1870	The Cattle Disease (Ireland) Amendment Act, 1870	The whole act.
35 & 36 Vict. c. 16	Cattle Disease (Ireland) Amendment Act 1872	The Cattle Disease (Ireland) Amendment Act, 1872	The whole act.
37 & 38 Vict. c. 6	Cattle Disease (Ireland) Acts Amendment Act 1874	The Cattle Disease (Ireland) Acts Amendment Act, 1874	The whole act.
39 & 40 Vict. c. 51	Cattle Disease (Ireland) Act 1876	The Cattle Disease (Ireland) Act, 1876	The whole act.

== Subsequent developments ==
The whole act, except section 34, was repealed by section 78 of, and the fifth schedule to, the Diseases of Animals Act 1894 (57 & 58 Vict. c. 57), which came into force on 25 August 1894.

== See also ==
- Contagious Diseases (Animals) Act
