= Jake Wilson (disambiguation) =

Jake Wilson is the 37th mayor of Somerville, Massachusetts.

Jake Wilson may also refer to:

- Jake Wilson (actor) in Citadel (film)
- Jake Wilson, character in Along the Great Divide

== See also ==
- Jacob Wilson (disambiguation)
