= Diseases of Animals Act 1894 =

Act of the Parliament of the United Kingdom

Diseases of Animals Act 1894 (Note: Section 79.)
- Act of Parliament
- Parliament of the United Kingdom
- Long title: An Act to consolidate the Contagious Diseases (Animals) Acts, 1878 to 1893.
- Citation: 57 & 58 Vict. c. 57
- Territorial extent: United Kingdom

Dates
- Royal assent: 25 August 1894
- Commencement: 25 August 1894 (Note: The Acts of Parliament (Commencement) Act 1793.)
- Repealed: England and Wales and Scotland: 1 January 1951; Northern Ireland:
Other legislation
Amends	See § Repealed enactments
Repeals/revokes	See § Repealed enactments
Amended by	Diseases of Animals Act 1903; Local Government (Scotland) Act 1947; Justices of the Peace Act 1949; Administration of Justice Act 1956
Repealed by	England and Wales and Scotland: Diseases of Animals Act 1950; Northern Ireland: Diseases of Animals (Northern Ireland) Act 1958

Status: Repealed

Text of statute as originally enacted

The Diseases of Animals Act 1894 (57 & 58 Vict. c. 57) was an act of the Parliament of the United Kingdom that consolidated enactments related to contagious diseases among animals in the United Kingdom.

The act was designed to combat "heavy losses" due to cattle diseases such as rinderpest, contagious bovine pleuropneumonia and foot-and-mouth disease (FMD).

== Provisions ==
=== Repealed enactments ===
Section 78 of the act repealed 8 enactments, listed in the fifth schedule to the act.

Citation	Short title	Extent of repeal
41 & 42 Vict. c. 74	Contagious Diseases (Animals) Act 1878	The whole act, except section thirty-four.
47 & 48 Vict. c. 13	Contagious Diseases (Animals) Act 1884	The whole act.
47 & 48 Vict. c. 47	Contagious Diseases (Animals) Transfer of Parts of Districts Act 1884	The whole act.
49 & 50 Vict. c. 32	Contagious Diseases (Animals) Act 1886	The whole act, except section nine.
52 & 53 Vict. c. 30	Board of Agriculture Act 1889	Section three.
53 & 54 Vict. c. 14	Contagious Diseases (Animals) (Pleuro-pneumonia) Act 1890	The whole act.
55 & 56 Vict. c. 47	Contagious Diseases (Animals) Act 1892	The whole act.
56 & 57 Vict. c. 43	Contagious Diseases (Animals) Act 1893	The whole act.

== Subsequent developments ==
The whole act was repealed for England and Wales and Scotland by section 89 of, and the fifth schedule to, the Diseases of Animals Act 1950 (14 Geo. 6. c. 36), which came into force on 1 January 1951.
