= Diseases of Animals Act 1950 =

Act of the Parliament of the United Kingdom

Diseases of Animals Act 1950 (Note: Section 91(1).)
- Act of Parliament
- Parliament of the United Kingdom
- Long title: An Act to consolidate the Diseases of Animals Acts, 1894 to 1937, and certain other enactments relating to diseases of animals.
- Citation: 14 Geo. 6. c. 36
- Territorial extent: England and Wales; Scotland; (Note: Section 91(2).)

Dates
- Royal assent: 26 October 1950
- Commencement: 1 January 1951 (Note: Section 91(3).)
- Repealed: 11 July 1981
Other legislation
Amends	See § Repealed enactments
Repeals/revokes	See § Repealed enactments
Amended by	Customs and Excise Act 1952; Statute Law Revision Act 1953; Administration of Justice Act 1956; Agricultural Marketing Act 1958; London Government Act 1963; Police Act 1964; Police (Scotland) Act 1967; Theft Act 1968; Medicines Act 1968; Forgery and Counterfeiting Act 1981
Repealed by	Animal Health Act 1981

Status: Repealed

Text of statute as originally enacted

The Diseases of Animals Act 1950 (14 Geo. 6. c. 36) was an act of the Parliament of the United Kingdom that consolidated enactments related to diseases of animals in Great Britain.

== Provisions ==
=== Repealed enactments ===
Section 89 of the act repealed 22 enactments, listed in the fifth schedule to the act.

Citation	Short title	Extent of repeal
57 & 58 Vict. c. 57	Diseases of Animals Act 1894	The whole act.
59 & 60 Vict. c. 15	Diseases of Animals Act 1896	The whole act.
3 Edw. 7. c. 43	Diseases of Animals Act 1903	The whole act.
6 Edw. 7. c. 32	Dogs Act 1906	Section two.
9 Edw. 7. c. 26	Diseases of Animals Act 1909	The whole act.
10 Edw. 7 & 1 Geo. 5. c. 20	Diseases of Animals Act 1910	The whole act.
4 & 5 Geo. 5. c. 15	Exportation of Horses Act 1914	The whole act.
13 Geo. 5. Sess. 2. c. 5	Importation of Animals Act 1922	The whole act.
15 & 16 Geo. 5. c. 30	Importation of Pedigree Animals Act 1925	The whole act.
17 & 18 Geo. 5. c. 13	Diseases of Animals Act 1927	The whole act.
19 & 20 Geo. 5. c. 17	Local Government Act 1929	In section one hundred and thirty-eight, in subsection (2) the words "the cattle pleuro-pneumonia account and"; in the Third Schedule, paragraph 1.
19 & 20 Geo. 5. c. 25	Local Government (Scotland) Act 1929	In the First Schedule, in Part I, paragraph 8.
22 & 23 Geo. 5. c. 53	Ottawa Agreements Act 1932	Section eight; the Third Schedule.
25 & 26 Geo. 5. c. 31	Diseases of Animals Act 1935	The whole act save section seventeen.
1 Edw. 8 & 1 Geo. 6. c. 42	Exportation of Horses Act 1937	The whole act.
1 Edw. 8 & 1 Geo. 6. c. 70	Agriculture Act 1937	Section eighteen; in section nineteen, in subsection (1), the words "the Diseases of Animals Acts, 1894 to 1935, and"; sections twenty to twenty-five; section twenty-seven; in section twenty-eight, subsection (1); in section twenty-nine, in subsection (1), paragraph (c); in section thirty-two the definitions of animals and poultry; the Second Schedule.
3 & 4 Geo. 6. c. 50	Agriculture (Miscellaneous War Provisions) (No. 2) Act 1940	Section four.
9 & 10 Geo. 6. c. 49	Acquisition of Land (Authorisation Procedure) Act 1946	In the Fourth Schedule the amendments of the Diseases of Animals Act 1894.
10 & 11 Geo. 6. c. 43	Local Government (Scotland) Act 1947	In the Ninth Schedule, paragraph 3.
11 & 12 Geo. 6. c. 35	Animals Act 1948	Part I.
11 & 12 Geo. 6. c. 52	Veterinary Surgeons Act 1948	In section twenty-three, paragraph (b).
12 & 13 Geo. 6. c. 37	Agriculture (Miscellaneous Provisions) Act 1949	In the Second Schedule, paragraph 2; section thirteen.

== Subsequent developments ==
The whole act was repealed by section 96 of, and schedule 6 to, the Animal Health Act 1981 (1981 c. 22), which came into force on 11 July 1981.
