= Contagious Diseases (Animals) Act 1869 =

Act of the Parliament of the United Kingdom

Contagious Diseases (Animals) Act 1869 (Note: Section 1.)
- Act of Parliament
- Parliament of the United Kingdom
- Long title: An Act to consolidate, amend, and make perpetual the Acts for preventing the introduction or spreading of Contagious or Infectious Diseases among Cattle and other Animals in Great Britain.
- Citation: 32 & 33 Vict. c. 70
- Territorial extent: England and Wales; Scotland; (Note: Section 2.)

Dates
- Royal assent: 9 August 1869
- Commencement: 9 August 1869 (Note: The Acts of Parliament (Commencement) Act 1793.)
- Repealed: 13 March 1975
Other legislation
| Amends | See § Repealed enactments |
| Repeals/revokes | See § Repealed enactments |
| Amended by | Contagious Diseases (Animals) (Scotland) Act 1875; Contagious Diseases (Animals) Act 1878 |
| Repealed by | Statute Law (Repeals) Act 1975 |

Status: Repealed

Text of statute as originally enacted

The Contagious Diseases (Animals) Act 1869 (32 & 33 Vict. c. 70) was an act of the Parliament of the United Kingdom that consolidated enactments related to contagious and infectious diseases among cattle and other animals in Great Britain.

== Provisions ==
=== Repealed enactments ===
Section 4 of the act repealed 8 enactments for Great Britain, listed in the first schedule to the act.

| Citation | Short title | Description | Extent of repeal |
|---|---|---|---|
| 38 Geo. 3 c. 65 | Diseased Sheep, etc. Act 1798 | An Act for preventing the depasturing of forests, commons, and open fields with sheep or lambs infected with the scab or mange in that part of Great Britain called England. | The whole act. |
| 11 & 12 Vict. c. 105 | Importation of Sheep Act 1848 | An Act to prohibit the importation of sheep, cattle, or other animals, for the purpose of preventing the introduction of contagious or infectious disorders. | The whole act. |
| 11 & 12 Vict. c. 107 | Contagious Disorders (Sheep), etc. Act 1848 | An Act to prevent, until the first day of September one thousand eight hundred and fifty, and to the end of the then session of Parliament, the spreading of contagious or infectious disorders among sheep, cattle, and other animals. | The whole act. |
| 16 & 17 Vict. c. 62 | Contagious Diseases (Animals) Act 1853 | An Act to extend and continue an Act of the twelfth year of Her present Majesty, to prevent the spreading of contagious or infectious disorders among sheep, cattle, and other animals. | The whole act. |
| 29 & 30 Vict. c. 2 | Cattle Diseases Prevention Act 1866 | The Cattle Diseases Prevention Act, 1866. | The whole act. |
| 29 & 30 Vict. c. 15 | Cattle Disease Act 1866 | An Act to amend the Act of the eleventh and twelfth years of Her present Majesty, chapter one hundred and seven, to prevent the spreading of contagious or infectious disorders among sheep, cattle, and other animals. | The whole act. |
| 29 & 30 Vict. c. 110 | Cattle Diseases Prevention Amendment Act 1866 | The Cattle Diseases Prevention Amendment Act, 1866. | The whole act. |
| 30 & 31 Vict. c. 125 | Contagious Diseases (Animals) Act 1867 | The Contagious Diseases (Animals) Act, 1867. | The whole act. |

== Subsequent developments ==
The whole act was repealed section 4(1) of, and the first schedule to, the Contagious Diseases (Animals) Act 1878 (41 & 42 Vict. c. 74), which came into force on 30 September 1878, except:

- Paragraphs 2, 3, and of section 28 (local), relating to the markets of the mayor, aldermen, and commons of the City of London, with the fifth schedule, referred to in that section.
- Sections 100 and 101 (transitory), relating to money borrowed by local authorities before the passing of that act.

The whole act was repealed by section 1(1) of, and part VIII of the schedule to, the Statute Law (Repeals) Act 1975, which came into force on 13 March 1975.
