= Jacob Wilson (agriculturist) =

English land agent, cattle breeder and agriculturist (1836–1905)

Sir Jacob Wilson KCVO (16 November 1836 – 11 July 1905) was an English land agent, cattle breeder, and prominent agriculturist.

== Early life ==
Born at Crackenthorpe Hall, Westmorland, on 16 November 1836, was the elder son in a family of two sons and three daughters of Joseph Wilson, farmer, by Ann, daughter of Joseph Bowstead, of Beck Bank, Cumberland. He was educated at Long Marton, Westmorland, under the Rev. W. Shepherd, and was afterwards in London for a short time studying land agency under T. Walton.

In 1854 Wilson went to the Royal Agricultural College at Cirencester, and after eighteen months obtained its diploma. He remained at Cirencester six months longer as honorary farm bailiff, and then went to Switzerland to assist in laying out on the English system an estate. He returned home in 1857 to help his father in the management of a large farm at Woodhorn Manor, near Newbiggin-by-the-Sea, Northumberland.

== Land agent ==
Making a career as land agent, Wilson in 1866 was appointed by the Earl of Tankerville the agent for his estates at Chillingham, Northumberland. He then took on the management of other estates and properties in different parts of England; and also took pupils in farming and land agency. He served as witness or arbitrator in valuation cases, and as an official umpire for the Board of Trade.

In 1881 Wilson moved from Woodhorn Manor to a farm at Chillingham Barns, Northumberland, on the estate of Lord Tankerville. Here he maintained a herd of shorthorns of the "Booth" blood, and as a county councillor and magistrate for Northumberland was active in county matters.

== Agriculturist ==
Wilson studied agricultural mechanics, especially steam cultivation. In 1859 he won the first agricultural diploma awarded by the Highland and Agricultural Society of Scotland. On 5 December 1860 he was elected an ordinary member of the Royal Agricultural Society of England. In the administration of the society he was elected as a member of council on 22 May 1865.

As steward Wilson was prominent in the management of the large annual provincial shows of the society from 1869 to 1874, and from 1875 to 1892 he was hon. director in succession to Sir Benjamin Thomas Brandreth-Gibbs. At the conclusion of the society's fiftieth show, held in Windsor Great Park under the presidency of Queen Victoria, Wilson was knighted by the Queen after dinner at Windsor Castle on 29 June 1889. Until his death he remained a member of the society's council, and he resumed the honorary directorship for the last show held in London in June 1905 on the society's showyard at Park Royal.

Wilson urged legislation for repressing the contagious diseases of animals, and was involved in the Contagious Diseases (Animals) Act 1878 (41 & 42 Vict. c. 74) and the Contagious Diseases (Animals) Act 1884 (47 & 48 Vict. c. 13). In April 1888 he presided over a departmental committee appointed to inquire into pleuro-pneumonia, and the Contagious Diseases (Animals) (Pleuro-pneumonia) Act 1890 (53 & 54 Vict. c. 14) carried out most of its recommendations. From 1892 to 1902 he was agricultural adviser to the Board of Agriculture in succession to Sir James Caird. His skill in administration and tact made him a powerful figure in the agricultural world.

== Death ==
At the conclusion of the Royal Agricultural Society's show of 1905, of which Wilson was honorary director, King Edward VII conferred on him the distinction of K.C.V.O. A few days later he was seized with illness which terminated fatally from heart failure on 11 July 1905. He was buried at Chillingham. A memorial service was held at St. George's, Hanover Square.

== Family ==
Wilson married in 1874 Margaret, daughter of Thomas Hedley of Cox Lodge Hall, Newcastle-on-Tyne, by whom he had two sons, Albert Edward Jacob (godchild of King Edward VII), who was an officer in the Northumberland Fusiliers, and Gordon Jacob (godchild of the Duke of Richmond and Gordon); and two daughters, Beatrice and Mildred. His wife and children survived him.

== Notes ==
Attribution

This article incorporates text from a publication now in the public domain: Lee, Sidney, ed. (1912). "Wilson, Jacob". Dictionary of National Biography (2nd supplement). Vol. 3. London: Smith, Elder & Co.
