= Horse Breeding Act 1958 =

Act of the Parliament of the United Kingdom

Horse Breeding Act 1958 (Note: Section 18(1).)
- Act of Parliament
- Parliament of the United Kingdom
- Long title: An Act to consolidate the Horse Breeding Act, 1918, and the Animals Act, 1948.
- Citation: 6 & 7 Eliz. 2. c. 43
- Territorial extent: England and Wales; Scotland; (Note: Section 18(4). Section 15 of the act does not extend to Scotland: section 18(3).)

Dates
- Royal assent: 23 July 1958
- Commencement: 23 August 1958 (Note: Section 18(2).)
- Repealed: 12 September 1984
Other legislation
Amends	See § Repealed enactments
Repeals/revokes	See § Repealed enactments
Amended by	Statute Law (Repeals) Act 1974; Statute Law (Repeals) Act 1976; Forgery and Counterfeiting Act 1981
Repealed by	Animal Health and Welfare Act 1984

Status: Repealed

Text of statute as originally enacted

The Horse Breeding Act 1958 (6 & 7 Eliz. 2. c. 43) was an act of the Parliament of the United Kingdom that consolidated enactments relating to horse breeding in Great Britain.

== Provisions ==
=== Repealed enactments ===
Section 17(1) of the act repealed 2 enactments, listed in that section.

Citation	Short title	Extent of repeal
8 & 9 Geo. 5. c. 13	Horse Breeding Act 1918	The whole act.
11 & 12 Geo. 6. c. 35	Animals Act 1948	The whole act.

== Subsequent developments ==
Section 17(1) of the act was repealed by section 1 of, and part XI of the schedule to, the Statute Law (Repeals) Act 1974, which came into force on 27 June 1974.

Sections 17(1), 17(6) and 17(7) of the act were repealed by section 1(1) of, and part III of schedule 1 to, the Statute Law (Repeals) Act 1976, which came into force on 27 May 1976.

The whole act was repealed by section 16(2) of, and schedule 2 to, the Animal Health and Welfare Act 1984, which came into force on 12 September 1984.
