= Contagious Diseases (Animals) Act 1892 =

Act of the Parliament of the United Kingdom

Contagious Diseases (Animals) Act 1892 (Note: Section 4.)
- Act of Parliament
- Parliament of the United Kingdom
- Long title: An Act to amend the Contagious Diseases (Animals) Acts, 1878 to 1890.
- Citation: 55 & 56 Vict. c. 47
- Territorial extent: United Kingdom

Dates
- Royal assent: 27 June 1892
- Commencement: 27 June 1892 (Note: The Acts of Parliament (Commencement) Act 1793.)
- Repealed: 25 August 1894
Other legislation
Amends	Contagious Diseases (Animals) Act 1878; Contagious Diseases (Animals) (Pleuro-Pneumonia) Act 1890
Repealed by	Diseases of Animals Act 1894

Status: Repealed

Text of statute as originally enacted

The Contagious Diseases (Animals) Act 1892 (55 & 56 Vict. c. 47) was an act of the Parliament of the United Kingdom passed by Lord Salisbury's Conservative government.

Local authorities were not making sufficient use of powers to combat animal diseases so the act introduced central control over the slaughter of infected animals and the payment of compensation.

== Subsequent developments ==
The whole act was repealed by section 78 of, and the fifth schedule to, the Diseases of Animals Act 1894 (57 & 58 Vict. c. 57), which came into force on 25 August 1894.
