= Contagious Diseases (Animals) Act 1893 =

Act of the Parliament of the United Kingdom

Contagious Diseases (Animals) Act 1893 (Note: Section 3.)
- Act of Parliament
- Parliament of the United Kingdom
- Long title: An Act to confer further powers under the Contagious Diseases (Animals) Acts, 1878 to 1892, with respect to Swine Fever.
- Citation: 56 & 57 Vict. c. 43
- Territorial extent: United Kingdom

Dates
- Royal assent: 12 September 1893
- Commencement: 1 November 1893 (Note: Section 2.)
- Repealed: 25 August 1894
Other legislation
Amends	Contagious Diseases (Animals) Act 1878Contagious Diseases (Animals) (Pleuro-Pneumonia) Act 1890
Repealed by	Diseases of Animals Act 1894

Status: Repealed

Text of statute as originally enacted

The Contagious Diseases (Animals) Act 1893 (56 & 57 Vict. c. 43) was an act of the Parliament of the United Kingdom passed by William Ewart Gladstone's Liberal government.

The act transferred from local authorities to the Board of Agriculture the responsibility for wiping out swine fever. This was estimated to relieve local rates of up to £50,000.

== Subsequent developments ==
The whole act was repealed by section 78 of, and the fifth schedule to, the Diseases of Animals Act 1894 (57 & 58 Vict. c. 57), which came into force on 25 August 1894.
