= Slaughter of Poultry Act 1967 =

Act of the Parliament of the United Kingdom

Slaughter of Poultry Act 1967 (Note: Section 9(1).)
- Act of Parliament
- Parliament of the United Kingdom
- Long title: An Act to provide for the humane slaughter, for certain commercial purposes, of poultry.
- Citation: 1967 c. 24
- Territorial extent: England and Wales; Scotland; (Note: Section 9(2).)

Dates
- Royal assent: 10 May 1967
- Commencement: 1 January 1970 (Note: Section 9(3). The Slaughter of Poultry Act 1967 (Commencement) Order 1969 (SI 1969/1096).)
- Repealed: Scotland: 1 January 2013

Other legislation
- Amended by: Local Government Act 1972; Animal Health and Welfare Act 1984; Statute Law (Repeals) Act 1993; Local Government (Wales) Act 1994; Welfare of Animals (Slaughter or Killing) Regulations 1995; Scotland Act 1998 (Consequential Modifications) (No. 2) Order 1999
- Repealed by: Scotland: Welfare of Animals at the Time of Killing (Scotland) Regulations 2012

Status: Partially repealed

Text of statute as originally enacted

Revised text of statute as amended

Text of the Slaughter of Poultry Act 1967 as in force today (including any amendments) within the United Kingdom, from legislation.gov.uk.

The Slaughter of Poultry Act 1967 (c. 24) is an act of the Parliament of the United Kingdom that provided for the humane slaughter, for certain commercial purposes, of poultry. Exemptions were made for slaughter by kosher and by halal means.
