= Petroleum (Production) Act (Northern Ireland) 1964 =

- Act of Parliament
- Parliament of Northern Ireland
- Long title: An Act to vest in the Ministry of Commerce the property in undeveloped petroleum in Northern Ireland; to make provision with respect to searching and boring for and getting petroleum; and for purposes connected with the matters aforesaid.
- Citation: 1964 c. 28 (N.I.)
- Territorial extent: Northern Ireland

Dates
- Royal assent: 13 October 1964
- Commencement: 13 October 1964

Other legislation
- Amends: Minerals (Miscellaneous Provisions) Act (Northern Ireland) 1959
- Amended by: Mineral Development Act (Northern Ireland) 1969; Mines Act (Northern Ireland) 1969

Status: Amended

The Petroleum (Production) Act (Northern Ireland) 1964 (c. 28 (N.I.)) is an act of the Parliament of Northern Ireland which vested in the Northern Ireland Ministry of Commerce the property in undeveloped petroleum. It also made provision for searching for and producing petroleum.

== Background ==
Earlier legislation such as the Land Purchases Acts had vested land, mines and mineral rights in the Northern Ireland Ministry of Finance, see for example the Minerals (Miscellaneous Provisions) Act (Northern Ireland) 1959 (1959 c. 17). By the early 1960s the commercial development of the oil and gas industry was a realistic prospect as seen in other parts of the UK. The responsibility for issuing exploration and production licences, and the holding of mineral rights was seen to be more appropriately vested in the Ministry of Commerce. This legislation enacted these requirements.

== Provisions ==
The Act comprises 20 Sections.

Section 1. Vesting of undeveloped petroleum in the Ministry of Commerce.

Section 2. Licences to search for and get petroleum.

Section 3. Application of Act of 1969 respecting land and ancillary rights.

Section 4. Compensation.

Section 5. Form and amount of compensation.

Section 6. Persons entitled to compensation.

Section 7. Claims for compensation.

Section 8. Awards of compensation by the Tribunal.

Section 9. Appearances before Tribunal.

Section 10. Repealed.

Section 11. Share of persons entitled under s. 13(3) of Irish Land Act 1903.

Section 11A. Payments under section 11.

Section 11B. Satisfaction of claims for compensation or for payments under section 11.

Section 11C. Disposal of dormant or unclaimed moneys.

Section 12. Account of receipts and expenditure under Act.

Section 13. Power to make regulations.

Section 14. Repealed.

Section 15. Interpretation.

Section 16. Repeals with saving 1918 c. 52.

Section 17. Application of this Act.

Section 18. Short title.

Note

Section 1 (4) of the Act defines the “strata in Northern Ireland” which includes strata beneath the internal waters adjacent to Northern Ireland, but does not include strata beneath the territorial sea of the United Kingdom adjacent to Northern Ireland.

== Later developments ==
The granting of petroleum licences “to explore for, bore for and get” petroleum in Northern Ireland under powers granted by the Petroleum (Production) Act (Northern Ireland) 1964 is vested in the Department of the Economy, as of 2026.

In 2024, the Minister for the Economy, Conor Murphy, announced legislation to prohibit oil and gas exploration and production - with the legislation including hydraulic fracturing - with the goal of supporting Northern Ireland's transition to an economy based on renewable energy. The legislation would amend the 1964 act.

== See also ==
- Petroleum Act
