= Animal Health Act 1981 =

Act of the Parliament of the United Kingdom

Animal Health Act 1981 (Note: Section 97(1).)
- Act of Parliament
- Parliament of the United Kingdom
- Long title: An Act to consolidate the Diseases of Animals Act 1935, the Diseases of Animals Act 1950, the Ponies Act 1969, the Rabies Act 1974, the Diseases of Animals Act 1975, and certain related enactments.
- Citation: 1981 c. 22
- Territorial extent: England and Wales; Scotland; Northern Ireland (sections 93 and 95(6) and part of schedule 6); (Note: Section 97(2).)

Dates
- Royal assent: 11 June 1981
- Commencement: 11 July 1981 (Note: Section 97(3).)

Other legislation
- Amends: See § Repealed enactments
- Repeals/revokes: See § Repealed enactments
- Amended by: Acquisition of Land Act 1981; Animal Health and Welfare Act 1984; Food Act 1984; Animal Health and Welfare Act 1984; Statute Law (Repeals) Act 1993; Animal Health (Amendment) Act 1998; Countryside and Rights of Way Act 2000; Animal Health Act 2002; Statute Law (Repeals) Act 2004; Animal Welfare (Livestock Exports) Act 2024

Status: Amended

Text of statute as originally enacted

Revised text of statute as amended

Text of the Animal Health Act 1981 as in force today (including any amendments) within the United Kingdom, from legislation.gov.uk.

The Animal Health Act 1981 (c. 22) is an act of the Parliament of the United Kingdom that consolidated enactments related to diseases of animals in Great Britain.

== Provisions ==
=== Repealed enactments ===
Section 96(2) of the act repealed 23 enactments, listed in the sixth schedule to the act.

Citation	Short title	Extent of repeal
25 & 26 Geo. 5. c. 31	Diseases of Animals Act 1935	The whole act.
14 Geo. 6. c. 36	Diseases of Animals Act 1950	The whole act.
2 & 3 Eliz. 2. c. 39	Agriculture (Miscellaneous Provisions) Act 1954	Section 11. Schedule 2.
4 & 5 Eliz. 2. c. 46	Administration of Justice Act 1956	Section 49(2).
10 & 11 Eliz. 2. c. 46	Transport Act 1962	In Part I of Schedule 2, the entry relating to the Diseases of Animals Act 1950.
1963 c. 11	Agriculture (Miscellaneous Provisions) Act 1963	Sections 13 and 14. Section 16(1). In section 16(3), the words— (a) "the Minister to whom the fee was paid or, as the case may be,"; and (b) "he or".
1963 c. 33	London Government Act 1963	In section 54(4), the words "The Diseases of Animals Act 1950". In Part I of Schedule 13, paragraph 1.
1967 c. 22	Agriculture Act 1967	Section 66.
1967 c. 80	Criminal Justice Act 1967	In Part I of Schedule 3, the entry relating to the Diseases of Animals Act 1950.
1968 c. 67	Medicines Act 1968	In Schedule 6, the entry relating to Part II of and Schedule 3 to the Diseases of Animals Act 1950.
1969 c. 28	Ponies Act 1969	The whole act.
1970 c. 40	Agriculture Act 1970	Section 105(2) to (5). Section 106(3).
1971 c. 23	Courts Act 1971	In Part I of Schedule 9, the entry relating to the Diseases of Animals Act 1950.
1972 c. 62	Agriculture (Miscellaneous Provisions) Act 1972	Sections 1 to 3.
1972 c. 68	European Communities Act 1972	In Schedule 4, paragraph 7.
1973 c. 65	Local Government (Scotland) Act 1973	Section 144(1), (2).
1974 c. 7	Local Government Act 1974	In Schedule 6, paragraph 7.
1974 c. 17	Rabies Act 1974	The whole act.
1975 c. 40	Diseases of Animals Act 1975	The whole act.
1976 c. 55	Agriculture (Miscellaneous Provisions) Act 1976	Sections 8 to 10. In Schedule 3, the reference to the Diseases of Animals Act 1950.
1976 c. 63	Bail Act 1976	In Schedule 2, paragraph 13.
1977 c. 45	Criminal Law Act 1977	Section 55(1) to (3).
1979 c. 2	Customs and Excise Management Act 1979	In Part I of the Table of textual amendments in paragraph 12 of Schedule 4, the entry relating to the Diseases of Animals Act 1950.

== Subsequent developments ==
The act has been amended on several occasions. The Animal Health and Welfare Act 1984 amended the act with provisions relating to the seizure of things for the purpose of preventing the spread of disease. The Animal Health Act 2002 further extended its powers, particularly in relation to foot and mouth disease, scrapie, and other exotic and endemic notifiable animal diseases.
