= Insurance Companies Act 1982 =

Act of the Parliament of the United Kingdom

Insurance Companies Act 1982 (Note: Section 100(1).)
- Act of Parliament
- Parliament of the United Kingdom
- Long title: An Act to consolidate the Insurance Companies Acts 1974 and 1981.
- Citation: 1982 c. 50
- Territorial extent: United Kingdom (Note: Section 100(3).)

Dates
- Royal assent: 28 October 1982
- Commencement: 28 January 1983 (Note: Section 100(2).)
- Repealed: 1 December 2001

Other legislation
- Amends: Insurance Brokers (Registration) Act 1977; See § Repealed enactments
- Repeals/revokes: See § Repealed enactments
- Amended by: Inheritance Tax Act 1984; Companies Consolidation (Consequential Provisions) Act 1985; Income and Corporation Taxes Act 1988; Road Traffic (Consequential Provisions) Act 1988; Statute Law (Repeals) Act 1993; Statute Law (Repeals) Act 1995
- Repealed by: Financial Services and Markets Act 2000 (Consequential Amendments and Repeals) Order 2001

Status: Repealed

Text of statute as originally enacted

Revised text of statute as amended

The Insurance Companies Act 1982 (c. 50) was an act of the Parliament of the United Kingdom that consolidated enactments relating to insurance companies in the United Kingdom.

== Provisions ==
=== Repealed enactments ===
Section 99(3) of the act repealed 8 enactments, listed in schedule 6 to the act.

Citation	Short title	Extent of repeal
1974 c. 49	Insurance Companies Act 1974	The whole act, except sections 88(1)(b) and 90 and Schedule 1.
1975 c. 75	Policyholders Protection Act 1975	Section 22(1).
1976 c. 69	Companies Act 1976	In Schedule 2, the entries relating to sections 17(1) and 75(2) of the Insurance Companies Act 1974.
1980 c. 25	Insurance Companies Act 1980	In section 1, paragraph (a) and, to the extent an Act therein mentioned is repealed by this Act, paragraph (b). Section 2. Schedule 1. In Schedule 4, paragraph 18.
1980 c. 43	Magistrates' Courts Act 1980	In Schedule 7, paragraph 133.
1981 c. 31	Insurance Companies Act 1981	The whole Act, except sections 36(1), 38 and Part II of Schedule 4.
1981 c. 62	Companies Act 1981	In Schedule 3, paragraph 35.
SI 1981/1657 (c. 44)	Insurance Companies Act 1981 (Commencement) Order 1981	In the Schedule, paragraphs 2–9, 11, 12, 14 and 15.

== Subsequent developments ==
The whole act was repealed by the Financial Services and Markets Act 2000 (Consequential Amendments and Repeals) Order 2001 (SI 2001/3649), made under the Financial Services and Markets Act 2000, which came into force on 1 December 2001.
