= Insurance Companies Act 1958 =

Act of the Parliament of the United Kingdom

Insurance Companies Act 1958 (Note: Section 37(1).)
- Act of Parliament
- Parliament of the United Kingdom
- Long title: An Act to consolidate the Assurance Companies Acts 1909 to 1946, and the enactments amending those Acts with corrections and improvements made under the Consolidation of Enactments (Procedure) Act 1949.
- Citation: 6 & 7 Eliz. 2. c. 72
- Territorial extent: England and Wales; Scotland; (Note: Section 37(3).)

Dates
- Royal assent: 1 August 1958
- Commencement: 1 November 1958 (Note: Section 37(2).)
- Repealed: 1 December 2001
Other legislation
Amends	See § Repealed enactments
Repeals/revokes	See § Repealed enactments
Amended by	Income and Corporation Taxes Act 1970; Insurance Companies Act 1974; Statute Law (Repeals) Act 1974
Repealed by	Financial Services and Markets Act 2000 (Consequential Amendments and Savings) (Industrial Assurance) Order 2001

Status: Repealed

Text of statute as originally enacted

Revised text of statute as amended

The Insurance Companies Act 1958 (6 & 7 Eliz. 2. c. 72) was an act of the Parliament of the United Kingdom that consolidated enactments relating to assurance and insurance companies in Great Britain.

== Provisions ==
=== Repealed enactments ===
Section 36 of the act repealed 7 enactments, listed in part II of the fifth schedule to the act.

Citation	Short title	Extent of repeal
9 Edw. 7. c. 49	Assurance Companies Act 1909	The whole act.
13 & 14 Geo. 5. c. 8	Industrial Assurance Act 1923	Sections twelve and forty-two.
20 & 21 Geo. 5. c. 43	Road Traffic Act 1930	Section forty-two.
23 & 24 Geo. 5. c. 9	Assurance Companies (Winding Up) Act 1933	The whole act.
25 & 26 Geo. 5. c. 45	Assurance Companies (Winding Up) Act 1935	The whole act.
9 & 10 Geo. 6. c. 28	Assurance Companies Act 1946	The whole act except section five.
11 & 12 Geo. 6. c. 38	Companies Act 1948	In section four hundred and fifty-six, the words "The Assurance Companies Acts, 1909 to 1946,"; in the Sixteenth Schedule, paragraph 1.

== Subsequent developments ==
Section 36(2) and (3) of, and part II of schedule 5 to, the act were repealed by section 1 of, and part XI of the schedule to, the Statute Law (Repeals) Act 1974, which came into force on 27 June 1974.

The act was substantially repealed by section 88(2) of, and schedule 2 to, the Insurance Companies Act 1974 (c. 49), which came into force on 31 August 1974.

The whole act was repealed by article 5 of, and paragraph 7 of schedule 3 to, the Financial Services and Markets Act 2000 (Consequential Amendments and Savings) (Industrial Assurance) Order 2001 (SI 2001/3647), which came into force on 1 December 2001.
