= Industrial Assurance Act 1923 =

Act of the Parliament of the United Kingdom

Industrial Assurance Act 1923 (Note: Section 46(1).)
- Act of Parliament
- Parliament of the United Kingdom
- Long title: An Act to consolidate and amend the law relating to Industrial Assurance, and to make provision with respect to war bond policies and policies to which the Courts (Emergency Powers) Act, 1914, applies, and bond investment business.
- Citation: 13 & 14 Geo. 5. c. 8
- Territorial extent: Great Britain; Isle of Man; Channel Islands; (Note: Section 46(2).)

Dates
- Royal assent: 7 June 1923
- Commencement: 1 January 1924 (Note: Section 46(3).)
- Repealed: 1 December 2001 (Note: The Financial Services and Markets Act 2000 (Commencement No. 7) Order 2001.)

Other legislation
- Amends: See § Repealed enactments
- Repeals/revokes: See § Repealed enactments
- Amended by: Industrial Assurance and Friendly Societies Act 1948; Justices of the Peace Act 1949; Statute Law Revision Act 1950; Industrial Assurance and Friendly Societies Act 1948 (Amendment) Act 1958; Insurance Companies Act 1958; Companies Act 1967; Friendly and Industrial and Provident Societies Act 1968; Friendly Societies Act 1971; Insurance Companies Amendment Act 1973; Friendly Societies Act 1974; Criminal Procedure (Scotland) Act 1975; Criminal Justice Act 1982; Statute Law (Repeals) Act 1986; Financial Services Act 1986; Friendly Societies Act 1992
- Repealed by: Financial Services and Markets Act 2000

Status: Repealed

Text of statute as originally enacted

Revised text of statute as amended

The Industrial Assurance Act 1923 (13 & 14 Geo. 5. c. 8) was an act of the Parliament of the United Kingdom that consolidated and amended enactments related to industrial assurance in Great Britain, the Isle of Man, and the Channel Islands.

== Provisions ==
=== Repealed enactments ===
Section 46(4) of the act repealed 3 enactments, listed in the fifth schedule to the act, except as far as they related to Ireland.

Citation	Short title	Extent of repeal
59 & 60 Vict. c. 26	Collecting Societies and Industrial Assurance Companies Act 1896	The whole act.
9 Edw. 7. c. 49	Assurance Companies Act 1909	Section thirty-six.
12 & 13 Geo. 5. c. 50	Expiring Laws Act 1922	So far as it continues the provisions of the Courts (Emergency Powers) Act 1914, relating to policies of insurance.

== Subsequent developments ==
The whole act was repealed by sections 416(1)(a) and 432(3) of, and schedule 22 to, the Financial Services and Markets Act 2000 (2000 c. 8), which came into force on 1 December 2001.
