= Insurance Brokers (Registration) Act 1977 =

Act of the Parliament of the United Kingdom

Insurance Brokers (Registration) Act 1977 (Note: Section 30(1).)
- Act of Parliament
- Parliament of the United Kingdom
- Long title: An Act to provide for the registration of insurance brokers and for the regulation of their professional standards; and for purposes connected therewith.
- Citation: 1977 c. 46
- Territorial extent: United Kingdom (Note: Section 30(2).)

Dates
- Royal assent: 29 July 1977
- Commencement: various (Note: Section 30(3)–(4).)
- Repealed: 30 April 2001 (Note: The Financial Services and Markets Act 2000 (Commencement No. 2) Order 2001 (SI 2001/1282).)

Other legislation
- Amended by: Insurance Companies Act 1981; Senior Courts Act 1981; Insurance Companies Act 1982; Financial Services Act 1986; Government Trading Act 1990; Courts and Legal Services Act 1990; Companies Act 1989 (Eligibility for Appointment as Company Auditor) (Consequential Amendments) Regulations 1991; Companies (1990 Order) (Eligibility for Appointment as Company Auditor) (Consequential Amendments) Regulations (Northern Ireland) 1993; Insurance Companies (Third Insurance Directives) Regulations 1994; Insurance Brokers (Registration) Act 1977 (Amendment) Order 1995; Transfer of Functions (Insurance) Order 1997; Health Act 1999; Insurance Brokers (Registration) Act 1977 (Amendment) Order 1999
- Repealed by: Financial Services and Markets Act 2000

Status: Repealed

Text of statute as originally enacted

Revised text of statute as amended

The Insurance Brokers (Registration) Act 1977 (c. 46) was an act of the Parliament of the United Kingdom. It set out a scheme for the regulation of insurance brokers, through registration with the Insurance Brokers Registration Council (IBRC). The Act was repealed in 2001, and the IBRC dissolved.

== See also ==
- Financial Services Authority
