= Assurance Companies Act 1909 =

Act of the Parliament of the United Kingdom

Assurance Companies Act 1909 (Note: Section 38(1).)
- Act of Parliament
- Parliament of the United Kingdom
- Long title: An Act to consolidate and amend and extend to other Companies carrying on Assurance or Insurance business the Law relating to Life Assurance Companies, and for other purposes connected therewith.
- Citation: 9 Edw. 7. c. 49
- Territorial extent: United Kingdom

Dates
- Royal assent: 3 December 1909
- Commencement: 1 July 1910 (Note: Section 38(2).)
- Repealed: England and Wales and Scotland: 1 November 1958; Northern Ireland:
Other legislation
Amends	See § Repealed enactments
Repeals/revokes	See § Repealed enactments
Amended by	Industrial Assurance Act 1923; False Oaths (Scotland) Act 1933
Repealed by	England and Wales and Scotland: Insurance Companies Act 1958; Northern Ireland: Insurance Companies Act (Northern Ireland) 1968

Status: Repealed

Text of statute as originally enacted

The Assurance Companies Act 1909 (9 Edw. 7. c. 49) was an act of the Parliament of the United Kingdom that consolidated enactments relating to life assurance companies and extended the regulatory framework to other classes of assurance and insurance business.

The act regulated motor vehicle insurance and became the catalyst for the Road Traffic Act 1930 (20 & 21 Geo. 5. c. 43).

== Provisions ==
=== Repealed enactments ===
Section 37 of the act repealed five enactments, listed in the ninth schedule to the act.

Citation	Short title	Extent of repeal
33 & 34 Vict. c. 61	Life Assurance Companies Act 1870	The whole act.
34 & 35 Vict. c. 58	Life Assurance Companies Act 1871	The whole act.
35 & 36 Vict. c. 41	Life Assurance Companies Act 1872	The whole act.
39 & 40 Vict. c. 22	Trade Union Act Amendment Act 1876	Section seven.
7 Edw. 7. c. 46	Employers' Liability Insurance Companies Act 1907	The whole act.

== Subsequent developments ==
The whole act was repealed for England and Wales and Scotland by section 36 of, and the fifth schedule to, the Insurance Companies Act 1958 (6 & 7 Eliz. 2. c. 72), which came into force on 1 November 1958.

== Bibliography ==
- Maurice Hawtrey Truelove. The Assurance Companies Act, 1909. P S King & Son. Orchard House, Westminster. London. 1910. Google.
- John Henry Watts. The Assurance Companies Act, 1909. Stevens & Sons. London. 1910. Reviewed at (1911) 36 Law Magazine and Review (Fifth Series) 240
- Eric Gore-Browne. The Law relating to Assurance Companies under the Assurance Companies Act, 1909. Jordan & Sons Limited. Chancery Lane, London. 1910. Google.
