= Part VII transfer =

A Part VII transfer, also known as an insurance business transfer scheme, is a transfer of business or parts of a business under Part VII of the Financial Services & Markets Act 2000 in the United Kingdom. Part VII transfers are a common tool used by insurance businesses to address required business transformation in preparation for or in response to Brexit.

== Background ==
Insurance companies based in the United Kingdom can operate in other parts of the European Union under a so-called EU passport arrangement for financial services. Under this arrangement, insurance policies for risks elsewhere in the EU, can be underwritten in the UK. With the UK's departure from the EU, insurers would not be able to pay out claims under such policies. According to the Financial Conduct Authority, this could affect 38 million policyholders with policy values of up to GBP 55 billion.

== Transfer ==
Under a Part VII transfer, an insurance company will set up a separate legal entity in an EU country that will service policies with EU clients after Brexit. A submission to a UK court will be made to transfer the book of business to this EU entity. Once approved, clients will need to be duly informed that their business will move. The process usually takes approximately 18 months. Prior to Brexit, 10 such applications were made to UK courts on average per year. Given the volume of transfers in the run up to the date when the UK leaves the EU, there have been reports about delays in court hearings.

The Prudential Regulation Authority (PRA) which oversees insurance businesses has proposed increasing the fee it charges companies for such business transfers to GBP 20,000 effective 1 March 2019 given the complexity of the transaction.

In a similar fashion, banks use the Part VII transfer framework to move their swap business to EU entities.

Approaches and timelines chosen by companies vary given the cost and complexity of the transfer. While some companies have already transferred their business or are in the process of it, others are exploring alternative options. As an alternative to Part VII transfers, some financial institutions have alternatively opted to sign new contracts with clients in their post-Brexit location.
