= Financial Services Act 1986 =

Act of the Parliament of the United Kingdom

Financial Services Act 1986 (Note: Section 212(1).)
- Act of Parliament
- Parliament of the United Kingdom
- Long title: An Act to regulate the carrying on of investment business; to make related provision with respect to insurance business and business carried on by friendly societies; to make new provision with respect to the official listing of securities, offers of unlisted securities, takeover offers and insider dealing; to make provision as to the disclosure of information obtained under enactments relating to fair trading, banking, companies and insurance; to make provision for securing reciprocity with other countries in respect of facilities for the provision of financial services; and for connected purposes.
- Citation: 1986 c. 60
- Territorial extent: United Kingdom

Dates
- Royal assent: 7 November 1986
- Commencement: various (Note: Section 211.)
- Repealed: 1 December 2001
Other legislation
| Amends | Industrial Assurance Act 1923; Restrictive Trade Practices Act 1976; Insurance Brokers (Registration) Act 1977; Banking Act 1979; Airports Act 1986 |
| Repeals/revokes | Prevention of Fraud (Investments) Act 1958 |
| Amended by | Banking Act 1987; Tribunals and Inquiries Act 1992; Charities Act 1993; Criminal Justice Act 1993 |
| Repealed by | Financial Services and Markets Act 2000 (Consequential Amendments and Repeals) Order 2001 |
| Relates to | Banking Act 1987 |

Status: Repealed

Text of statute as originally enacted

Revised text of statute as amended

The Financial Services Act 1986 (c. 60) was an act of the Parliament of the United Kingdom passed by the government of Margaret Thatcher to regulate the financial services industry. The act used a mixture of governmental regulation and self-regulation, and created a Securities and Investments Board (SIB) presiding over various new self-regulating organisations (SROs). It was superseded by the Financial Services and Markets Act 2000.

== Context ==
The act may be thought of as an “emasculated Gower”. Professor Laurence Gower had been asked to produce a report on financial regulation, followed by a draft bill. He tended towards a tighter and more top-heavy regime. The Thatcher government became impatient with this process and pushed a second bill through in place of Gower with more emphasis on self-regulation but containing most of the regulatory content of the Gower bill.

This relatively light approach to regulation followed a trend taking place in America under the Reagan administration.

== Derivative products ==
Section 63 of the act abolished any oversight of the courts on derivative contracts, which might otherwise have been considered speculative and thus contrary to the Gaming Act 1845. This exemption was not changed in the new Financial Services and Markets Act 2000.

== Repeal ==
The act was repealed on 1 December 2001 by the Financial Services and Markets Act 2000 (Consequential Amendments and Repeals) Order 2001 (SI 2001/3649) and was superseded by the Financial Services and Markets Act 2000. Under this, the SIB and SROs were merged to form the Financial Services Authority (FSA), and self-regulation took a back seat.

== See also ==
- Gower Report
- Glass–Steagall Act of 1933
- Depository Institutions Deregulation and Monetary Control Act of 1980
- Garn–St. Germain Depository Institutions Act of 1982
- Financial Services and Markets Act 2000
- Financial Services Authority

== Bibliography ==
- Rider, B., Chaikin, D. and Abrams, C. (1987). Guide to the Financial Service Act 1986. CCH Editions.
