= Collecting Societies and Industrial Assurance Companies Act 1896 =

Act of the Parliament of the United Kingdom

Collecting Societies and Industrial Assurance Companies Act 1896 (Note: Section 20.)
- Act of Parliament
- Parliament of the United Kingdom
- Long title: An Act to consolidate the Enactments relating to Friendly Societies and Industrial Assurance Companies which receive Contributions and Premiums by means of Collectors.
- Citation: 59 & 60 Vict. c. 26
- Introduced by: Robert William Hanbury MP (Commons)
- Territorial extent: United Kingdom; Isle of Man; Channel Islands; (Note: Section 19.)

Dates
- Royal assent: 7 August 1896
- Commencement: 1 January 1897 (Note: Section 19.)
- Repealed: 1 January 1924
Other legislation
| Amends | See § Repealed enactments |
| Repeals/revokes | See § Repealed enactments |
| Repealed by | Industrial Assurance Act 1923 |
| Relates to | Friendly Societies Act 1896 |

Status: Repealed

History of passage through Parliament

Records of Parliamentary debate relating to the statute from Hansard

Text of statute as originally enacted

The Collecting Societies and Industrial Assurance Companies Act 1896 (59 & 60 Vict. c. 26) was an act of the Parliament of the United Kingdom that consolidated enactments relating to friendly societies and industrial assurance companies in the United Kingdom.

== Passage ==
Leave to bring in the Collecting Societies Bill to the House of Commons was granted to Robert William Hanbury MP and the chancellor of the exchequer, Michael Hicks Beach on 8 June 1896. The bill had its first reading in the House of Commons on 8 June 1896, presented by Robert William Hanbury MP. The bill had its second reading in the House of Commons on 24 June 1896 and was committed to the Joint Committee on Statute Law Revision Bills, &c., which reported on 16 July 1896, with amendments. The amended bill was re-committed to a committee of the whole house, which met and reported on 23 July 1896, without amendments. The bill had its third reading in the House of Commons on 23 July 1896 and passed, without amendments.

The bill had its first reading in the House of Lords on 24 July 1896. The bill had its second reading in the House of Lords on 27 July 1896 and was committed to a committee of the whole house, which met and reported on 28 July 1896, with amendments. The amended bill had its third reading in the House of Lords on 30 July 1896 and passed, without amendments.

The bill was granted royal assent on 7 August 1896.

== Provisions ==
=== Repealed enactments ===
Section 18 of the act repealed 4 enactments, listed in the schedule to the act.

| Citation | Short Title | Title | Extent of repeal |
|---|---|---|---|
| 38 & 39 Vict. c. 60 | Friendly Societies Act 1875 | The Friendly Societies Act, 1875. | The whole act so far as it is unrepealed. |
| 50 & 51 Vict. c. 56 | Friendly Societies Act 1887 | The Friendly Societies Act, 1887. | The whole act so far as it is unrepealed. |
| 52 & 53 Vict. c. 22 | Friendly Societies Act 1889 | The Friendly Societies Act, 1889. | The whole act. |
| 58 & 59 Vict. c. 26 | Friendly Societies Act 1895 | The Friendly Societies Act, 1895. | The whole act so far as it is unrepealed. |

== Subsequent developments ==
The act was described as a consolidation act.

The whole act was repealed by section 46(4) of, and the fifth schedule to, the Industrial Assurance Act 1923 (13 & 14 Geo. 5. c. 8), which came into force on 1 January 1924.
