= Insurance Companies Act 1974 =

Act of the Parliament of the United Kingdom

Insurance Companies Act 1974 (Note: Section 90(1).)
- Act of Parliament
- Parliament of the United Kingdom
- Long title: An Act to consolidate, with certain exceptions, the provisions of the Insurance Companies Acts 1958 to 1973.
- Citation: 1974 c. 49
- Territorial extent: England and Wales; Scotland; (Note: Section 90(3).)

Dates
- Royal assent: 31 July 1974
- Commencement: 31 August 1974 (Note: Section 90(2).)
- Repealed: 15 November 1983

Other legislation
- Amends: See § Repealed enactments
- Repeals/revokes: See § Repealed enactments
- Amended by: Income and Corporation Taxes Act 1988
- Repealed by: Statute Law (Repeals) Act 1993

Status: Repealed

Text of statute as originally enacted

The Insurance Companies Act 1974 (c. 49) was an act of the Parliament of the United Kingdom that consolidated, with certain exceptions, enactments relating to insurance companies in Great Britain.

== Provisions ==
=== Repealed enactments ===
Section 88(2) of the act repealed 3 enactments, listed in schedule 2 to the act.

Citation	Short title	Extent of repeal
6 & 7 Eliz. 2. c. 72	Insurance Companies Act 1958	The whole act, so far as unrepealed, except sections 19(1), 20, 34, 36(4), (5) and (7) and 37(1) and (3).
1967 c. 81	Companies Act 1967	Part II, so far as unrepealed, except sections 60(3), 86, 87, 89, 90, 91, 96, 97, 99, 102(3) and (4), 107 and 108 and the definition of "director" in section 102(2). In section 111(1)(a) the words "the Insurance Companies Act 1958". Section 130(3). Schedule 5. Part I of Schedule 6. Part VI of Schedule 8.
1973 c. 58	Insurance Companies Amendment Act 1973	The whole act except sections 50, 51, 54(1), 56, 57(1), paragraphs 15 to 17 of Schedule 1, and Schedules 3 to 5.

== Subsequent developments ==
The whole act, except sections 88(1)(b) and 90 and schedule 1, was repealed by section 99(3) of, and schedule 6 to, the Insurance Companies Act 1982, which came into force on 28 January 1983.

The whole act was repealed by section 1(1) of, and group 2 of part V of schedule 1 to, the Statute Law (Repeals) Act 1993, which came into force on 5 November 1993.
