= Gower Report =

The Gower Report into investor protection proposed regulations for the financial services industry in the United Kingdom in the late 1980s. It led to the establishment of the Securities and Investments Board, the forerunner to the Financial Services Authority.

== Background ==
Throughout the greater part of the 20th century the UK financial services industry was largely self-regulated in its nature. The main regulatory legislation was the Prevention of Fraud (Investments) Act 1958 which was introduced in an attempt to provide a degree of consumer protection, but in itself did not go far enough as the scope was narrow and was frequently open to interpretation.

A number of factors, both positive and negative, forced the government to reconsider the way financial services were regulated in the UK. These included a number of highly publicised scandals to hit the UK financial services sector in the '70s and '80s involving mis-selling of personal pension schemes, endowments and split capital investment trusts.

In response to these factors the Government appointed the Wilson Committee in 1980 to review the financial system. The Government, unsatisfied with their findings, recruited Professor Laurence Gower in 1981 to consider new legislation. His mandate was as follows:-

- The level of statutory investor protection
- how investment advice and management advice are controlled
- whether law changes should be made to improve consumer protection
- the relevant developments of the EEC (European Economic Community)

Gower produced his report and the Government adopted a number of his proposals in a white paper (Jan 1985). The Financial Services Act 1986 (FSAct) followed the white paper, receiving royal assent in November 1986. Its scope centered on Investment business and activities carried out in relation to those investments.

In line with the proposals given by Gower, The FSAct named the Securities and Investments Board (SIB) as the designated agency for the supervision of investment business within the UK (the forerunner to the Financial Services Authority FSA). The SIB created five Self-Regulatory Organisations (SROs), later condensed to three:

- The Personal Investment Authority
- The Investment Management Regulatory Organisation
- the Securities and Futures Authority

These were all later subsumed into the FSA.

In addition the SIB also recognised other bodies that conducted day-to-day regulation of investment business:-

- Recognised professional bodies (RPBs) (nine in total including the Law Society)
- Recognised Investment Exchanges (RIEs)
- Recognised Clearing Houses (RCHs)
