= Laurence Gower =

Laurence Cecil Bartlett Gower MBE (29 December 1913 – 25 December 1997) known as 'Jim' and universally credited as "LCB Gower" in his writings, was a lawyer and academic who was Vice Chancellor of the University of Southampton from 1971–79.

== Early life ==
He was born in Forest Gate, London (then part of Essex) and educated at Lindisfarne College. He then attended University College, London graduating LLB with first class honours in 1933 and LLM in 1934. He qualified as a solicitor in 1937.

== War service ==
He served in the army throughout World War II initially in the Royal Artillery (RA) as a Private where he served under Sir Mortimer Wheeler. He ended service as a Lieutenant-Colonel in the Royal Army Ordnance Corps (RAOC). He was involved in the planning at Wilton House of the D-Day landings in France.

== Academic career ==
After leaving the army, he commenced academic work as a lecturer in law at University College, London. He was also Sir Ernest Cassel Professor of Commercial Law at the London School of Economics Law School, University of London from 1948 to 1952 and visiting professor at Harvard Law School from 1954 to 1955. He became professor and dean of the Faculty of Law, University of Lagos from 1962 to 1965. He was the first Law Commissioner of England and Wales from 1965 to 1971 and subsequently vice-chancellor, University of Southampton from 1971 to 1979.

During his time at Southampton, there was increasing financial stringency and increasing student numbers. However, the new Medical School expanded and there was provision of special residential facilities for disabled students. All first year students were able to live in university accommodation. At the same time, he served on Harold Wilson's Royal Commission on the Press. After retirement he was asked by the Department of Trade to provide advice to the Government on financial services resulting in the Financial Services Act 1986. He is best known for his work in the UK company law, where he authored the leading treatise, now taken over by PL Davies,

== Personal life ==
On 7 September 1939, he married Helen Margaret Shepperson (Peggy) Birch (22 March 1911– 22 June 1999), a secondary school teacher, and they had two sons and a daughter. He died in Camden, London.

== Publications ==
- The Principles of Modern Company Law (1954), pub. Sweet & Maxwell, 6th revised edition (24 July 1997), ISBN 978-0421524804.
- LCB Gower (1956). "Some Contrasts between British and American Corporation Law". Harvard Law Review. 69 (8). Harvard Law Review Association: 1369–1402. doi:10.2307/1337659. JSTOR 1337659.

== See also ==
- List of University of Southampton people
- Gower Report
- UK company law

Academic offices
Preceded by Kenneth Mather	Vice Chancellor of the University of Southampton; 1971-1979	Succeeded by John Roberts CBE
