= List of acts of the Parliament of the United Kingdom from 1909 =

This is a complete list of acts of the Parliament of the United Kingdom for the year 1909.

Note that the first parliament of the United Kingdom was held in 1801; parliaments between 1707 and 1800 were either parliaments of Great Britain or of Ireland). For acts passed up until 1707, see the list of acts of the Parliament of England and the list of acts of the Parliament of Scotland. For acts passed from 1707 to 1800, see the list of acts of the Parliament of Great Britain. See also the list of acts of the Parliament of Ireland.

For acts of the devolved parliaments and assemblies in the United Kingdom, see the list of acts of the Scottish Parliament, the list of acts of the Northern Ireland Assembly, and the list of acts and measures of Senedd Cymru; see also the list of acts of the Parliament of Northern Ireland.

The number shown after each act's title is its chapter number. Acts passed before 1963 are cited using this number, preceded by the year(s) of the reign during which the relevant parliamentary session was held; thus the Union with Ireland Act 1800 is cited as "39 & 40 Geo. 3 c. 67", meaning the 67th act passed during the session that started in the 39th year of the reign of George III and which finished in the 40th year of that reign. Note that the modern convention is to use Arabic numerals in citations (thus "41 Geo. 3" rather than "41 Geo. III"). Acts of the last session of the Parliament of Great Britain and the first session of the Parliament of the United Kingdom are both cited as "41 Geo. 3". Acts passed from 1963 onwards are simply cited by calendar year and chapter number.

== 9 Edw. 7 ==
The fourth session of the 28th Parliament of the United Kingdom, which met from 16 February 1909 until 3 December 1909.

This session was also traditionally cited as 9 Ed. 7 or 9 E. 7.

=== Public general acts ===
| Short title | Citation | Royal assent |
Long title
| Consolidated Fund (No. 1) Act 1909 (repealed) | 9 Edw. 7. c. 1 | 15 March 1909 |
An Act to apply a sum out of the Consolidated Fund to the service of the year ending on the thirty-first day of March one thousand nine hundred and nine. (Repealed by Statute Law Revision Act 1927 (17 & 18 Geo. 5. c. 42))
| Consolidated Fund (No. 2) Act 1909 (repealed) | 9 Edw. 7. c. 2 | 30 March 1909 |
An Act to apply certain sums out of the Consolidated Fund to the service of the years ending on the thirty-first day of March one thousand nine hundred and eight, one thousand nine hundred and nine, and one thousand nine hundred and ten. (Repealed by Statute Law Revision Act 1927 (17 & 18 Geo. 5. c. 42))
| Army (Annual) Act 1909 (repealed) | 9 Edw. 7. c. 3 | 30 April 1909 |
An Act to provide, during Twelve Months, for the Discipline and Regulation of the Army. (Repealed by Statute Law Revision Act 1927 (17 & 18 Geo. 5. c. 42), Statute Law Revision Act 1950 (14 Geo. 6. c. 6) and Revision of the Army and Air Force Acts (Transitional Provisions) Act 1955 (3 & 4 Eliz. 2. c. 20))
| Indian Councils Act 1909 or the Government of India Act 1909 (repealed) | 9 Edw. 7. c. 4 | 25 May 1909 |
An Act to amend the Indian Councils Acts, 1861 (Note: Indian Councils Act 1861 (24 & 25 Vict. c. 67)) and 1892, (Note: Indian Councils Act 1892 (55 & 56 Vict. c. 14)) and the Government of India Act, 1833. (Note: Government of India Act 1833 (3 & 4 Will. 4. c. 85)) (Repealed by Government of India Act 1915 (5 & 6 Geo. 5. c. 61) (Note: Incorrectly cited as "SLR 1927" in the Chronological Table of the Statutes.))
| Appropriation Act 1909 (repealed) | 9 Edw. 7. c. 5 | 16 August 1909 |
An Act to apply a sum out of the Consolidated Fund to the service of the year ending on the thirty-first day of March one thousand nine hundred and ten, and to appropriate the Supplies granted in this Session of Parliament. (Repealed by Statute Law Revision Act 1927 (17 & 18 Geo. 5. c. 42))
| Public Works Loans Act 1909 (repealed) | 9 Edw. 7. c. 6 | 16 August 1909 |
An Act to grant Money for the purpose of certain Local Loans out of the Local Loans Fund, and for other purposes relating to Local Loans. (Repealed by Statute Law Revision Act 1927 (17 & 18 Geo. 5. c. 42))
| Labour Exchanges Act 1909 (repealed) | 9 Edw. 7. c. 7 | 20 September 1909 |
An Act to provide for the establishment of Labour Exchanges and for other purposes incidental thereto. (Repealed for England and Wales and Scotland by Employment and Training Act 1948 (11 & 12 Geo. 6. c. 46) and for Northern Ireland by Employment and Training Act (Northern Ireland) 1950 (c. 29 (N.I.)))
| Trawling in Prohibited Areas Prevention Act 1909 (repealed) | 9 Edw. 7. c. 8 | 20 September 1909 |
An Act to prohibit the landing and selling in the United Kingdom of fish caught in prohibited areas of the sea adjoining Scotland or Ireland. (Repealed by Statute Law (Repeals) Act 1986 (c. 12))
| South Africa Act 1909 (repealed) | 9 Edw. 7. c. 9 | 20 September 1909 |
An Act to constitute the Union of South Africa. (Repealed by Statute Law (Repeals) Act 1976 (c. 16))
| Superannuation Act 1909 (repealed) | 9 Edw. 7. c. 10 | 20 September 1909 |
An Act to amend the Superannuation Acts, 1834 to 1892. (Repealed for England and Wales and Scotland by Superannuation Act 1965 (c. 74) and for Northern Ireland by Superannuation Act (Northern Ireland) 1967 (c. 24 (N.I.)))
| Judicature (Rule Committee) Act 1909 (repealed) | 9 Edw. 7. c. 11 | 20 October 1909 |
An Act to amend the Judicature Acts, 1873 to 1894, with respect to the Persons in whom the power of making Rules of Court under those Acts is vested. (Repealed by Supreme Court of Judicature (Consolidation) Act 1925 (15 & 16 Geo. 5. c. 49))
| Marine Insurance (Gambling Policies) Act 1909 | 9 Edw. 7. c. 12 | 20 October 1909 |
An Act to prohibit Gambling on Loss by Maritime Perils.
| Local Education Authorities (Medical Treatment) Act 1909 (repealed) | 9 Edw. 7. c. 13 | 20 October 1909 |
An Act to provide for the recovery by Local Education Authorities of Costs for Medical Treatment of Children attending Public Elementary Schools in England and Wales. (Repealed by Education Act 1921 (11 & 12 Geo. 5. c. 51))
| Assistant Postmaster-General Act 1909 (repealed) | 9 Edw. 7. c. 14 | 20 October 1909 |
An Act to enable an Assistant Postmaster-General to sit in the House of Commons. (Repealed by Ministers of the Crown Act 1937 (1 Edw. 8 & 1 Geo. 6. c. 38))
| Board of Agriculture and Fisheries Act 1909 | 9 Edw. 7. c. 15 | 20 October 1909 |
An Act to enable a second Secretary to be appointed for the Board of Agriculture and Fisheries.
| Workmen's Compensation (Anglo-French Convention) Act 1909 (repealed) | 9 Edw. 7. c. 16 | 20 October 1909 |
An Act to authorise the making of such modifications in the Workmen's Compensation Act, 1906, (Note: Workmen's Compensation Act 1906 (6 Edw. 7. c. 58)) in its application to French Citizens, as may be necessary to give effect to a Convention between His Majesty and the President of the French Republic. (Repealed for England and Wales and Scotland by Workmen's Compensation Act 1925 (15 & 16 Geo. 5. c. 84) and for Northern Ireland by Statute Law Revision Act 1950 (14 Geo. 6. c. 6))
| Metropolitan Ambulances Act 1909 (repealed) | 9 Edw. 7. c. 17 | 20 October 1909 |
An Act to enable the London County Council to establish and maintain an Ambulance Service in London. (Repealed by Public Health (London) Act 1936 (26 Geo. 5 & 1 Edw. 8. c. 50))
| Naval Establishments in British Possessions Act 1909 (repealed) | 9 Edw. 7. c. 18 | 20 October 1909 |
An Act to make better provision respecting Naval Establishments in British Possessions. (Repealed by Statute Law (Repeals) Act 1976 (c. 16))
| Colonial Naval Defence Act 1909 (repealed) | 9 Edw. 7. c. 19 | 20 October 1909 |
An Act to amend the Colonial Naval Defence Act, 1865. (Note: Colonial Naval Defence Act 1865 (28 & 29 Vict. c. 14)) (Repealed by Colonial Naval Defence Act 1931 (21 & 22 Geo. 5. c. 9))
| Telegraph (Arbitration) Act 1909 (repealed) | 9 Edw. 7. c. 20 | 20 October 1909 |
An Act to give further powers to the Railway and Canal Commission to determine differences with respect to Telegraphs (including Telephones). (Repealed by Telecommunications Act 1984 (c. 12))
| Irish Handloom Weavers Act 1909 (repealed) | 9 Edw. 7. c. 21 | 20 October 1909 |
An Act to protect the interests of Handloom Weavers and for other purposes in connection therewith. (Repealed by Trade Descriptions Act 1968 (c. 29))
| Trade Boards Act 1909 (repealed) | 9 Edw. 7. c. 22 | 20 October 1909 |
An Act to provide for the establishment of Trade Boards for certain Trades. (Repealed for England and Wales and Scotland by Wages Councils Act 1945 (8 & 9 Geo. 6. c. 17) and for Northern Ireland by Trade Boards Act (Northern Ireland) 1923 (13 & 14 Geo. 5. c. 32 (N.I.)))
| Board of Trade Act 1909 (repealed) | 9 Edw. 7. c. 23 | 20 October 1909 |
An Act to remove the Statutory Limitation on the Salary of the President of the Board of Trade. (Repealed by Ministers of the Crown Act 1937 (1 Edw. 8 & 1 Geo. 6. c. 38))
| Merchandise Marks (Ireland) Act 1909 (repealed) | 9 Edw. 7. c. 24 | 25 November 1909 |
An Act to enable the Department of Agriculture and Technical Instruction for Ireland to undertake Prosecutions in certain cases under the Merchandise Marks Act, 1887. (Note: Merchandise Marks Act 1887 (50 & 51 Vict. c. 28)) (Repealed by Statute Law Revision Act 1953 (2 & 3 Eliz. 2. c. 5))
| Fisheries (Ireland) Act 1909 (repealed) | 9 Edw. 7. c. 25 | 25 November 1909 |
An Act to amend the Fisheries (Ireland) Acts, 1842 to 1901. (Repealed by Fisheries Act (Northern Ireland) 1966 (c. 17 (N.I.)))
| Diseases of Animals Act 1909 (repealed) | 9 Edw. 7. c. 26 | 25 November 1909 |
An Act to provide for the Payment of Fees to Veterinary Surgeons and Practitioners for Notification of Diseases of Animals. (Repealed for England and Wales and Scotland by Diseases of Animals Act 1950 (14 Geo. 6. c. 36) and for Northern Ireland by Diseases of Animals Act (Northern Ireland) 1958 (c. 13 (N.I.)))
| Prisons (Scotland) Act 1909 (repealed) | 9 Edw. 7. c. 27 | 25 November 1909 |
An Act to provide for the appointment of women as members of visiting committees for prisons in Scotland. (Repealed by Criminal Justice (Scotland) Act 1949 (12, 13 & 14 Geo. 6. c. 94))
| Summary Jurisdiction (Scotland) Act 1908, Amendment Act 1909 (repealed) | 9 Edw. 7. c. 28 | 25 November 1909 |
An Act to remove doubts as to the manner in which accused persons may be detained in custody, pending trial, under the provisions of the Summary Jurisdiction (Scotland) Act, 1908. (Note: Summary Jurisdiction (Scotland) Act 1908 (8 Edw. 7. c. 65)) (Repealed by Summary Jurisdiction (Scotland) Act 1954 (2 & 3 Eliz. 2. c. 48))
| Education (Administrative Provisions) Act 1909 (repealed) | 9 Edw. 7. c. 29 | 25 November 1909 |
An Act to make provision for the better administration by Central and Local Authorities in England and Wales of the enactments relating to Education. (Repealed by Education Act 1921 (11 & 12 Geo. 5. c. 51))
| Cinematograph Act 1909 (repealed) | 9 Edw. 7. c. 30 | 25 November 1909 |
An Act to make better provision for securing safety at Cinematograph and other Exhibitions. (Repealed by Cinemas Act 1985 (c. 13))
| Weeds and Agricultural Seeds (Ireland) Act 1909 (repealed) | 9 Edw. 7. c. 31 | 25 November 1909 |
An Act to prevent the spread of Noxious Weeds in Ireland, and to make provision for the testing of Agricultural Seeds. (Repealed by Noxious Weeds (Northern Ireland) Order 1977 (SI 1977/52 (N.I. 1)))
| Health Resorts and Watering-Places (Ireland) Act 1909 (repealed) | 9 Edw. 7. c. 32 | 25 November 1909 |
An Act to empower Local Authorities in Ireland to strike a Rate for advertising Health Resorts and Watering Places. (Repealed by Development of Tourist Traffic Act (Northern Ireland) 1948 (c. 4 (N.I.)))
| Wild Animals in Captivity Protection (Scotland) Act 1909 (repealed) | 9 Edw. 7. c. 33 | 25 November 1909 |
An Act to extend the Wild Animals in Captivity Protection Act, 1900, (Note: Wild Animals in Captivity Protection Act 1900 (63 & 64 Vict. c. 33)) to Scotland. (Repealed by Protection of Animals (Scotland) Act 1912 (2 & 3 Geo. 5. c. 14))
| Electric Lighting Act 1909 (repealed) | 9 Edw. 7. c. 34 | 25 November 1909 |
An Act to amend the Acts relating to Electric Lighting. (Repealed by Electricity Act 1989 (c. 29))
| Police (Liverpool Inquiry) Act 1909 (repealed) | 9 Edw. 7. c. 35 | 25 November 1909 |
An Act to facilitate the proceedings of any Commissioner who may be appointed to hold an inquiry respecting the conduct of the Police of the City of Liverpool in dealing with disturbances of the peace in that city during the twelve months preceding the passing of this Act. (Repealed by Statute Law Revision Act 1927 (17 & 18 Geo. 5. c. 42))
| Local Registration of Title (Ireland) Act 1909 (repealed) | 9 Edw. 7. c. 36 | 25 November 1909 |
An Act to make provision with respect to the application of the Local Registration of Title (Ireland) Act, 1891, (Note: Local Registration of Title (Ireland) Act 1891 (54 & 55 Vict. c. 66)) to the County of Cork. (Repealed by Statute Law (Repeals) Act 1993 (c. 50))
| Motor Car (International Circulation) Act 1909 (repealed) | 9 Edw. 7. c. 37 | 25 November 1909 |
An Act to enable Orders in Council to be made for the purpose of giving effect to any Convention for facilitating the International Circulation of Motor Cars. (Repealed by Motor Vehicles (International Circulation) Act 1952 (15 & 16 Geo. 6 & 1 Eliz. 2. c. 39))
| County Councils Mortgages Act 1909 (repealed) | 9 Edw. 7. c. 38 | 25 November 1909 |
An Act to remove certain limitations on the borrowing by a County Council by way of mortgage under the Local Government Act, 1888. (Note: Local Government Act 1888 (51 & 52 Vict. c. 41)) (Repealed by Local Government Act 1933 (23 & 24 Geo. 5. c. 51))
| Oaths Act 1909 (repealed) | 9 Edw. 7. c. 39 | 25 November 1909 |
An Act to amend the Law as to Oaths. (Repealed by Oaths Act 1978 (c. 19))
| Police Act 1909 | 9 Edw. 7. c. 40 | 25 November 1909 |
An Act to amend the Metropolitan Police Acts 1829 to 1899, and to make better provision for the widows and children of constables who lose their lives in the execution of their duty.
| Naval Discipline Act 1909 (repealed) | 9 Edw. 7. c. 41 | 25 November 1909 |
An Act to enable the punishment of Detention to be substituted for the punishment of Imprisonment for Offences against Naval Discipline under the Naval Discipline Act. (Note: Naval Discipline Act 1866 (29 & 30 Vict. c. 109)) (Repealed by Naval Discipline Act 1957 (5 & 6 Eliz. 2. c. 53))
| Irish Land Act 1909 | 9 Edw. 7. c. 42 | 3 December 1909 |
An Act to amend the Law relating to the Occupation and Ownership of Land in Ireland, and for other purposes relating thereto.
| Revenue Act 1909 | 9 Edw. 7. c. 43 | 3 December 1909 |
An Act to amend the Law relating to Customs and Inland Revenue, and for other purposes connected with Finance.
| Housing, Town Planning, etc. Act 1909 (repealed) | 9 Edw. 7. c. 44 | 3 December 1909 |
An Act to amend the Law relating to the Housing of the Working Classes, to provide for the making of Town Planning schemes, and to make further provision with respect to the appointment and duties of County Medical Officers of Health, and to provide for the establishment of Public Health and Housing Committees of County Councils. (Repealed for England and Wales by Housing, Town Planning, &c. Act 1919 (9 & 10 Geo. 5. c. 35), Housing Act 1925 (15 & 16 Geo. 5. c. 14), Town Planning Act 1925 (15 & 16 Geo. 5. c. 16), Settled Land Act 1925 (15 & 16 Geo. 5. c. 18), Local Government Act 1933 (23 & 24 Geo. 5. c. 51), Public Health Act 1936 (26 Geo. 5 & 1 Edw. 8. c. 49) and Public Health (London) Act 1936 (26 Geo. 5 & 1 Edw. 8. c. 50) and for Scotland by Housing, Town Planning, etc. (Scotland) Act 1919 (9 & 10 Geo. 5. c. 60), Housing (Scotland) Act 1925 (15 & 16 Geo. 5. c. 15), Town Planning (Scotland) Act 1925 (15 & 16 Geo. 5. c. 17), Local Government (Scotland) Act 1947 (10 & 11 Geo. 6. c. 43) and Statute Law Revision Act 1950 (14 Geo. 6. c. 6))
| Isle of Man (Customs) Act 1909 (repealed) | 9 Edw. 7. c. 45 | 3 December 1909 |
An Act to amend the Law with respect to Customs in the Isle of Man. (Repealed by Customs and Excise Act 1952 (15 & 16 Geo. 6 & 1 Eliz. 2. c. 44))
| Expiring Laws Continuance Act 1909 (repealed) | 9 Edw. 7. c. 46 | 3 December 1909 |
An Act to continue various Expiring Laws. (Repealed by Statute Law Revision Act 1927 (17 & 18 Geo. 5. c. 42))
| Development and Road Improvement Funds Act 1909 (repealed) | 9 Edw. 7. c. 47 | 3 December 1909 |
An Act to promote the Economic Development of the United Kingdom and the Improvement of Roads therein. (Repealed by Statute Law (Repeals) Act 1989 (c. 43))
| Asylums Officers' Superannuation Act 1909 (repealed) | 9 Edw. 7. c. 48 | 3 December 1909 |
An Act to provide for Superannuation Allowances to Officers and Servants employed in Public Asylums for the Insane in Great Britain and Ireland; and to make other relative provisions. (Repealed for England and Wales by National Health Service (Superannuation) Regulations 1947 (SR&O 1947/1755), for Scotland by National Health Service (Scotland) (Superannuation) Regulations 1948 (SI 1948/412) and for Northern Ireland by Health Services (Superannuation) Regulations (Northern Ireland) 1948 (SR&O (NI) 1948 No. 161))
| Assurance Companies Act 1909 (repealed) | 9 Edw. 7. c. 49 | 3 December 1909 |
An Act to consolidate and amend and extend to other Companies carrying on Assurance or Insurance business the Law relating to Life Assurance Companies, and for other purposes connected therewith. (Repealed for England and Wales and Scotland by Insurance Companies Act 1958 (6 & 7 Eliz. 2. c. 72) and for Northern Ireland by Insurance Companies Act (Northern Ireland) 1968 (c. 6 (N.I.)))

=== Local acts ===
| Short title | Citation | Royal assent |
Long title
| Zetland Masonic Sick and Widows and Orphans Fund Order Confirmation Act 1909 (repealed) | 9 Edw. 7. c. i | 30 March 1909 |
An Act to confirm a Provisional Order under the Private ΑLegislation Procedure (Scotland) Act 1899 (Note: Private Legislation Procedure (Scotland) Act 1899 (62 & 63 Vict. c. 47)) relating to the Zetland Masonic Sick and Widows and Orphans Fund. (Repealed by Statute Law (Repeals) Act 1998 (c. 43))
| | Zetland Masonic Sick and Widows and Orphans Fund Order 1909 | |
| Hastings Harbour Act 1909 | 9 Edw. 7. c. ii | 25 May 1909 |
An Act to revive the powers limited by the Hastings Harbour Act 1890 (Note: Hastings Harbour Act 1890 (53 & 54 Vict. c. cxliii)) and the Hastings Harbour Act 1897 (Note: Hastings Harbour Act 1897 (60 & 61 Vict. c. cxii)) for the compulsory purchase of lands as extended by the Hastings Harbour Acts 1900 (Note: Hastings Harbour Act 1900 (63 & 64 Vict. c. xxxiii)) 1903 (Note: Hastings Harbour Act 1903 (3 Edw. 7. c. ccxxxix)) and 1905 (Note: Hastings Harbour Act 1905 (5 Edw. 7. c. xiv)) and also to extend the period limited by those Acts for the construction and completion of the harbour and works.
| London, Chatham and Dover Railway Act 1909 | 9 Edw. 7. c. iii | 25 May 1909 |
An Act to enable the London Chatham and Dover Railway Company to raise further capital.
| Anglo-Argentine Tramways Company Act 1909 | 9 Edw. 7. c. iv | 25 May 1909 |
An Act to make provision with reference to the rearrangement of the capital of the Anglo-Argentine Tramways Company Limited.
| Wirral Railway (Extension of Time) Act 1909 | 9 Edw. 7. c. v | 25 May 1909 |
An Act to revive and extend the powers for the purchase of land and the period limited for the construction and completion of the railway authorised by the Wirral Railway Act 1898 (Note: Wirral Railway Act 1898 (61 & 62 Vict. c. lxvii)) to extend the time for the sale of surplus lands and for other purposes.
| Heckmondwike and Liversedge Gas Act 1909 | 9 Edw. 7. c. vi | 25 May 1909 |
An Act to authorise the Heckmondwike Gas Company to extend their gasworks to construct certain footpaths to raise additional capital to convert their shares into stock to change the name of the Company and for other purposes.
| Leyland Gas Act 1909 | 9 Edw. 7. c. vii | 25 May 1909 |
An Act for conferring further powers on the Leyland and Farington Gas Company and for changing the name of the Company.
| Littlehampton Gas Act 1909 | 9 Edw. 7. c. viii | 25 May 1909 |
An Act for the dissolution and reincorporation of the Littlehampton Gas Company Limited and for other purposes.
| Wandsworth Borough Council (Superannuation) Act 1909 (repealed) | 9 Edw. 7. c. ix | 25 May 1909 |
An Act to provide for the granting of superannuation allowances to the officers and servants of the mayor aldermen and councillors of the metropolitan borough of Wandsworth and for other purposes. (Repealed by Local Law (Greater London Council and Inner London Boroughs) Order 1965 (SI 1965/540))
| United Kingdom Temperance and General Provident Institution Act 1909 | 9 Edw. 7. c. x | 25 May 1909 |
An Act to incorporate the United Kingdom Temperance and General Provident Institution and to provide for the management of its affairs and for other purposes.
| Conway Gas Act 1909 (repealed) | 9 Edw. 7. c. xi | 25 May 1909 |
An Act to empower the mayor aldermen and burgesses of the borough of Conway in the county of Carnarvon to supply gas outside the limits of their district and to borrow further moneys and for other purposes in connexion with their gas undertaking. (Repealed by Conway Gas (Charges) Order 1937 (SR&O 1937/641))
| North Metropolitan Electric Power Supply Act 1909 (repealed) | 9 Edw. 7. c. xii | 25 May 1909 |
An Act to confer further powers upon the North Metropolitan Electric Power Supply Company and for other purposes. (Repealed by North Metropolitan Electric Power Supply (Consolidation) Act 1928 (18 & 19 Geo. 5. c. cxviii))
| Great Western Railway, Liskeard and Looe, and Liskeard and Caradon Railways Act 1909 | 9 Edw. 7. c. xiii | 25 May 1909 |
An Act to provide for the working of the undertaking of the Liskeard and Looe Railway Company by the Great Western Railway Company and for the vesting of the undertaking of the Liskeard and Caradon Railway Company in the Great Western Railway Company and for other purposes.
| Wells Gas Act 1909 | 9 Edw. 7. c. xiv | 25 May 1909 |
An Act for conferring further powers on the Wells Gaslight Company.
| South Lincolnshire Water Act 1909 | 9 Edw. 7. c. xv | 25 May 1909 |
An Act to confer further powers upon the South Lincolnshire Water Company and for other purposes.
| Kirkwall Water Order Act 1909 | 9 Edw. 7. c. xvi | 25 May 1909 |
An Act to confirm a Provisional Order under the Burgh Police (Scotland) Act 1892 (Note: Burgh Police (Scotland) Act 1892 (55 & 56 Vict. c. 55)) relating to Kirkwall Water.
| | Kirkwall Water Order 1909 | |
| Land Drainage Provisional Order Confirmation (No. 2) Act 1909 | 9 Edw. 7. c. xvii | 25 May 1909 |
An Act to confirm a Provisional Order under the Land Drainage Act 1861 (Note: Land Drainage Act 1861 (24 & 25 Vict. c. 133)) in the matter of a proposed drainage district in the parishes of Westbury Minsterly and Pontesbury in the county of Salop.
| | Land Drainage (Shropshire) Order 1909 | |
| Land Drainage Provisional Order Confirmation (No. 3) Act 1909 | 9 Edw. 7. c. xviii | 25 May 1909 |
An Act to confirm a Provisional Order under the Land Drainage Act 1861 in the matter of a proposed drainage district in the parishes of Haxey and Owston in the county of Lincoln.
| | Land Drainage (Lincolnshire) Order 1909 | |
| Ards Railways Act 1909 | 9 Edw. 7. c. xix | 16 August 1909 |
An Act to authorise the guarantee by the county council of the administrative county of Down of dividends on portion of the share capital of the Ards Railways Company and for other purposes.
| Stock Conversion and Investment Trust Limited (North Eastern Railway Consols) Act 1909 | 9 Edw. 7. c. xx | 16 August 1909 |
An Act to confer further powers on the holders of preferred and deferred (North Eastern Railway consols) stock of the Stock Conversion and Investment Trust Limited to empower the North Eastern Railway Company to become trustees under the trust deed regulating the issue of such stocks and for other purposes.
| Rio Tinto Company (Delivery Warrants) Act 1909 | 9 Edw. 7. c. xxi | 16 August 1909 |
An Act to enable the Rio Tinto Company Limited to issue transferable certificates and warrants for the delivery of goods and for other purposes.
| Indian Railway Annuities (Sinking Funds) Act 1909 | 9 Edw. 7. c. xxii | 16 August 1909 |
An Act to include "B" Annuities payable under the East Indian Railway Company Purchase Act 1879 (Note: East Indian Railway Company Purchase Act 1879 (42 & 43 Vict. c. ccvi)) among the securities which may be purchased for the sinking fund created under that Act and to make corresponding provisions regarding securities which may be purchased for the sinking funds created under the Eastern Bengal Railway Company Purchase Act 1884 (Note: Eastern Bengal Railway Company Purchase Act 1884 (47 & 48 Vict. c. cciv)) the Scinde Punjaub and Delhi Railway Purchase Act 1886 (Note: Scinde Punjaub and Delhi Railway Purchase Act 1886 (49 & 50 Vict. c. xlii)) the Great Indian Peninsula Railway Purchase Act 1900 (Note: Great Indian Peninsula Railway Purchase Act 1900 (63 & 64 Vict. c. cxxxviii)) and the Madras Railway Annuities Act 1908 (Note: Madras Railway Annuities Act 1908 (8 Edw. 7. c. iii)) respectively.
| Midland Railway Act 1909 | 9 Edw. 7. c. xxiii | 16 August 1909 |
An Act to confer additional powers upon the Midland Railway Company for the construction of works and the acquisition of lands and for other purposes.
| Grantham Waterworks Act 1909 | 9 Edw. 7. c. xxiv | 16 August 1909 |
An Act to confer further powers on the Grantham Waterworks Company and for other purposes.
| Clevedon Water Act 1909 | 9 Edw. 7. c. xxv | 16 August 1909 |
An Act for incorporating and conferring powers upon the Clevedon Water Company and for other purposes.
| Worksop Waterworks Act 1909 | 9 Edw. 7. c. xxvi | 16 August 1909 |
An Act to sanction and confirm the construction by the Worksop Waterworks Company of existing works to authorise that Company to raise additional capital and for other purposes.
| Eastbourne Gas Act 1909 | 9 Edw. 7. c. xxvii | 16 August 1909 |
An Act for extending the limits of supply of the Eastbourne Gas Company to enable that Company to acquire the undertaking of the Hailsham Gas Company to consolidate their capital and for other purposes.
| Dudley Corporation Act 1909 (repealed) | 9 Edw. 7. c. xxviii | 16 August 1909 |
An Act to make further provision in regard to the tramways and light railways in the borough of Dudley. (Repealed by West Midlands County Council Act 1980 (c. xi))
| Donington Water Act 1909 | 9 Edw. 7. c. xxix | 16 August 1909 |
An Act to incorporate the Donington Water Company and to enable that Company to supply water in certain parishes in the county of Lincoln.
| Pontypool Gas and Water Act 1909 | 9 Edw. 7. c. xxx | 16 August 1909 |
An Act to enable the Pontypool Gas and Water Company to construct further waterworks to raise further capital and for other purposes.
| South Western Railway Act 1909 | 9 Edw. 7. c. xxxi | 16 August 1909 |
An Act to authorise the London and South Western Railway Company to construct new and maintain existing works to acquire additional lands and to raise further money and to provide for the transfer of a portion of the undertaking of the Plymouth and Dartmoor Railway Company and the undertaking of the Stonehouse Pool Improvement Company and the working by the Company of the Lee-on-the-Solent (Light) Railway and for other purposes.
| Cork, Bandon and South Coast Railway Act 1909 | 9 Edw. 7. c. xxxii | 16 August 1909 |
An Act to authorise the sale and transfer of the undertaking of the Ilen Valley Railway Company to the Cork Bandon and South Coast Railway Company and for other purposes.
| York Town and Blackwater Gas (Electric Lighting, &c.) Act 1909 | 9 Edw. 7. c. xxxiii | 16 August 1909 |
An Act to empower the York Town and Blackwater Gas Company to supply electricity and to confer further powers on them and for other purposes.
| Preston, Chorley and Horwich Tramways Act 1909 | 9 Edw. 7. c. xxxiv | 16 August 1909 |
An Act to extend the period limited by the Preston Chorley and Horwich Tramways Acts 1903 (Note: Preston Chorley and Horwich Tramways Act 1903 (3 Edw. 7. c. ccxxxv)) 1904 (Note: Preston Chorley and Horwich Tramways Act 1904 (4 Edw. 7. c. lvi)) and 1906 (Note: Preston Chorley and Horwich Tramways Act 1906 (6 Edw. 7. c. xxxiv)) for construction of works and land purchases and for other purposes.
| Bungay Water Act 1909 | 9 Edw. 7. c. xxxv | 16 August 1909 |
An Act to incorporate the Bungay Water Company and to enable that Company to supply water in certain parishes in the counties of Norfolk and Suffolk.
| County of Durham Electric Power Supply Act 1909 | 9 Edw. 7. c. xxxvi | 16 August 1909 |
An Act to confer further powers upon the County of Durham Electric Power Supply Company and for other purposes.
| Malvern Hills Act 1909 | 9 Edw. 7. c. xxxvii | 16 August 1909 |
An Act for conferring further powers upon the Malvern Hills Conservators and for other purposes.
| East Sussex County Council Act 1909 (repealed) | 9 Edw. 7. c. xxxviii | 16 August 1909 |
An Act to empower the County Council of the administrative county of East Sussex to construct sea defences for protecting the road between Brighton and Rottingdean and for other purposes. (Repealed by Brighton Corporation Act 1931 (21 & 22 Geo. 5. c. cix))
| Liverpool Corporation Act 1909 (repealed) | 9 Edw. 7. c. xxxix | 16 August 1909 |
An Act for empowering the Corporation of the City of Liverpool to execute street improvements to construct tramways and for other purposes. (Repealed by Liverpool Corporation Act 1921 (11 & 12 Geo. 5. c. lxxiv))
| Southport and Lytham Tramroad (Abandonment) Act 1909 | 9 Edw. 7. c. xl | 16 August 1909 |
An Act for the abandonment of the tramroad and works of the Southport and Lytham Tramroad Company the sale of the lands and property of the Company and for other purposes.
| Wallasey Tramways and Improvements Act 1909 (repealed) | 9 Edw. 7. c. xli | 16 August 1909 |
An Act to authorise the Wallasey Urban District Council to construct tramways and street improvements and for other purposes. (Repealed by County of Merseyside Act 1980 (c. x))
| University of Bristol Act 1909 | 9 Edw. 7. c. xlii | 16 August 1909 |
An Act to dissolve University College Bristol and to transfer all the property and liabilities of that College to the University of Bristol and for other purposes.
| Wakefield Corporation Act 1909 (repealed) | 9 Edw. 7. c. xliii | 16 August 1909 |
An Act to confer further powers upon the Corporation of Wakefield in regard to their water and electricity undertakings and for other purposes. (Repealed by West Yorkshire Act 1980 (c. xiv))
| Great Western Railway (Steam Vessels) Act 1909 | 9 Edw. 7. c. xliv | 16 August 1909 |
An Act to authorise the Great Western Railway Company to own and use vessels for the conveyance of traffic between the ports of Weymouth and Plymouth and the ports in the Channel Islands and certain French ports and for other purposes.
| Harrogate Gas Act 1909 | 9 Edw. 7. c. xlv | 16 August 1909 |
An Act to confer further powers upon the Harrogate Gas Company.
| Eskdale Railway Act 1909 | 9 Edw. 7. c. xlvi | 16 August 1909 |
An Act for incorporating the Eskdale Railway Company for vesting in that Company the undertaking of the Ravenglass and Eskdale Railway Company and for other purposes.
| Frimley and Farnborough District Water Act 1909 | 9 Edw. 7. c. xlvii | 16 August 1909 |
An Act for extending the limits of supply and conferring further powers upon the Frimley and Farnborough District Water Company and for other purposes.
| Lancashire and Yorkshire and North Eastern Railways Act 1909 | 9 Edw. 7. c. xlviii | 16 August 1909 |
An Act for enabling the Lancashire and Yorkshire Railway Company and the North Eastern Railway Company to construct a light railway in the West Riding of the county of York and for other purposes.
| South Staffordshire Waterworks Act 1909 | 9 Edw. 7. c. xlix | 16 August 1909 |
An Act to authorise the South Staffordshire Water- works Company to construct new works to sanction and confirm the construction of existing works to raise additional capital and for other purposes.
| North East London Railway Act 1909 (repealed) | 9 Edw. 7. c. l | 16 August 1909 |
An Act for conferring further powers upon the North East London Railway Company. (Repealed by Statute Law (Repeals) Act 2013 (c. 2))
| London and North Western Railway Act 1909 | 9 Edw. 7. c. li | 16 August 1909 |
An Act for conferring further powers upon the London and North Western Railway Company and for other purposes.
| Folkestone, Sandgate and Hythe Tramways Act 1909 | 9 Edw. 7. c. lii | 16 August 1909 |
An Act to extend the time for the construction of the authorised tramways of the Folkestone Sandgate and Hythe Tramways Company and for the acquisition of lands in connection therewith and for other purposes.
| Great Yarmouth (Burgh Castle Drainage) Act 1909 | 9 Edw. 7. c. liii | 16 August 1909 |
An Act for altering the area comprised in the Burgh Castle Separate Drainage District and for modifying the powers of the Drainage Board for that district and for other purposes.
| Southend-on-Sea Corporation Act 1909 | 9 Edw. 7. c. liv | 16 August 1909 |
An Act to increase the number of wards of the borough of Southend-on-Sea and the number of members of the council and to confer further powers upon the mayor aldermen and burgesses of that borough with respect to the disposal of sewage and for other purposes.
| Aldershot Gas and Water and District Lighting Act 1909 | 9 Edw. 7. c. lv | 16 August 1909 |
An Act to extend the limits of supply for gas of the Aldershot Gas and Water Company to empower the Company to construct additional waterworks and to supply electricity to change the name of the Company and for other purposes.
| Ammanford Gas Act 1909 | 9 Edw. 7. c. lvi | 16 August 1909 |
An Act for incorporating and conferring powers upon the Ammanford Gas Company.
| Manchester Corporation Act 1909 | 9 Edw. 7. c. lvii | 16 August 1909 |
An Act to confer further powers upon the lord mayor aldermen and citizens of the city of Manchester with reference to the construction of street works tramways and sewerage works and otherwise for the better local government and improvement of the city to extend the city and for other purposes.
| Lisburn Urban District Council Act 1909 | 9 Edw. 7. c. lviii | 16 August 1909 |
An Act to empower the urban district council of Lisburn to supply gas and to provide for the transfer of the undertaking of the Lisburn Gas Company Limited to the council and to make further and better provision with regard to the supply of water and for the improvement health local government and finance of the district and for other purposes.
| Westminster City Council (Superannuation and Pensions) Act 1909 | 9 Edw. 7. c. lix | 16 August 1909 |
An Act to provide for the granting of superannuation allowances to the officers and pensions to the servants of the metropolitan borough and city of Westminster and for other purposes. (Repealed by London Authorities (Superannuation) (Amendment) Order 1967 (SI 1967/1330))
| Alexandra (Newport and South Wales) Docks and Railways Act 1909 (repealed) | 9 Edw. 7. c. lx | 16 August 1909 |
An Act to empower the Alexandra (Newport and South Wales) Docks and Railway Company to raise additional capital to make provisions in relation to the consolidation and cancellation of existing capital to extend the time for the completion of certain works and for other purposes.
| Alliance and Dublin Gas Act 1909 | 9 Edw. 7. c. lxi | 16 August 1909 |
An Act to confer further powers upon the Alliance and Dublin Consumers Gas Company.
| West Gloucestershire Water Act 1909 | 9 Edw. 7. c. lxii | 16 August 1909 |
An Act for extending the limits of supply of and conferring further powers upon the West Gloucestershire Water Company and for other purposes.
| Derwent Valley Water Act 1909 | 9 Edw. 7. c. lxiii | 16 August 1909 |
An Act to confer further powers upon the Derwent Valley Water Board to confer powers upon the Leicester Corporation and the Sheffield Corporation and for other purposes.
| Oxford and District Tramways Act 1909 | 9 Edw. 7. c. lxiv | 16 August 1909 |
An Act to confer further powers upon the City of Oxford Electric Tramways Limited and to amend the Oxford and District Tramways Act 1907 (Note: Oxford and District Tramways Act 1907 (7 Edw. 7. c. cxlii)) and for other purposes.
| Pontypridd Waterworks (Amendment) Act 1909 | 9 Edw. 7. c. lxv | 16 August 1909 |
An Act to authorise the Pontypridd Waterworks Company to construct railways and other works in the counties of Brecon and Glamorgan to amend the Pontypridd Waterworks and Tramroad Act 1908 (Note: Pontypridd Waterworks and Tramroad Act 1908 (8 Edw. 7. c. lxix)) to abandon the construction of certain works authorised by the Act of 1908 and for other purposes.
| Swinton and Mexborough Gas Board Act 1909 (repealed) | 9 Edw. 7. c. lxvi | 16 August 1909 |
An Act to constitute and incorporate a Gas Board for the urban districts of Swinton and Mexborough in the west riding of the county of York and to transfer to and vest in such Board the undertaking of the Swinton and Mexborough Gas Light Company and for other purposes. (Repealed by Statute Law (Repeals) Act 1989 (c. 43))
| City of London (Street Traffic) Act 1909 | 9 Edw. 7. c. lxvii | 16 August 1909 |
An Act for the better regulation of the traffic in the streets of the city of London.
| Thames Tunnel (North and South Woolwich) Act 1909 | 9 Edw. 7. c. lxviii | 16 August 1909 |
An Act to empower the London County Council to make a subway under the River Thames in the metropolitan borough of Woolwich and for other purposes.
| South Western and Isle of Wight Junction Railway Act 1909 | 9 Edw. 7. c. lxix | 16 August 1909 |
An Act to empower the South Western and Isle of Wight Junction Railway Company to construct a railway and pier extension to raise additional capital to revive and extend the powers for the purchase of lands and the time limited for the completion of works by that Company and for other purposes.
| Gateshead and District Tramways Act 1909 | 9 Edw. 7. c. lxx | 16 August 1909 |
An Act to authorise the Gateshead and District Tramways Company to construct additional tramways and for other purposes.
| Central London Railway Act 1909 | 9 Edw. 7. c. lxxi | 16 August 1909 |
An Act to empower the Central London Railway Company to construct a new railway and subways and for other purposes.
| Hull and Barnsley Railway Act 1909 | 9 Edw. 7. c. lxxii | 16 August 1909 |
An Act to authorise the Hull and Barnsley Railway Company to construct new railways and for other purposes.
| Blackwood Gas Act 1909 | 9 Edw. 7. c. lxxiii | 16 August 1909 |
An Act for incorporating and conferring powers on the Blackwood Gas Company and for other purposes.
| Holywood Tramways Act 1909 | 9 Edw. 7. c. lxxiv | 16 August 1909 |
An Act to extend the time for the completion of tramways authorised by the Holywood Tramways Act 1904. (Note: Holywood Tramways Act 1904 (4 Edw. 7. c. ccvi))
| London County Council (Tramways and Improvements) Act 1909 | 9 Edw. 7. c. lxxv | 16 August 1909 |
An Act to empower the London County Council to construct and work new tramways and to alter and reconstruct existing tramways and make a new street and street improvements and other works to purchase the Highgate Hill tramways and for other purposes.
| Midland Great Western Railway of Ireland Act 1909 (repealed) | 9 Edw. 7. c. lxxvi | 16 August 1909 |
An Act to authorise the Midland Great Western Railway of Ireland Company to construct a new railway and acquire additional lands and for other purposes. (Repealed by Statute Law (Repeals) Act 2013 (c. 2))
| Barry Railway Act 1909 | 9 Edw. 7. c. lxxvii | 16 August 1909 |
An Act to enable the Barry Railway Company construct railways to confer powers upon that Company and the Vale of Glamorgan Railway Company and for other purposes.
| West Kent Electric Power Act 1909 | 9 Edw. 7. c. lxxviii | 16 August 1909 |
An Act for transferring to the West Kent Electric Company Limited certain of the powers of the Kent Electric Power Company and for other purposes.
| Methwold and Feltwell Drainage Act 1909 | 9 Edw. 7. c. lxxix | 16 August 1909 |
An Act for the more effectual drainage and improv- ment of certain lands in the parishes of Methwold and Feltwell in the county of Norfolk and for other purposes.
| South Eastern and London, Chatham and Dover Railways Act 1909 | 9 Edw. 7. c. lxxx | 16 August 1909 |
An Act to extend the time for the compulsory purchase of lands and for the completion of works for the South Eastern and London Chatham and Dover Railways to make provision respecting the carriage road bridge over the River Swale the management of the separate properties of the Two Companies by the managing committee and joint general meetings of the Two Companies and for other purposes.
| London County Council (Money) Act 1909 (repealed) | 9 Edw. 7. c. lxxxi | 16 August 1909 |
An Act to regulate the expenditure of money by the London County Council on capital account during the current financial period and the raising of money to meet such expenditure and for other purposes. (Repealed by London County Council (Finance Consolidation) Act 1912 (2 & 3 Geo. 5. c. cv))
| Llanelly Waterworks Act 1909 | 9 Edw. 7. c. lxxxii | 16 August 1909 |
An Act to empower the urban district council of Llanelly in the county of Carmarthen to construct and maintain additional waterworks to define and extend the limits for the supply of water and for other purposes.
| Northallerton Waterworks Act 1909 | 9 Edw. 7. c. lxxxiii | 16 August 1909 |
An Act to empower the Council of the urban district of Northallerton to construct additional waterworks and for other purposes.
| Great Western Railway (General Powers) Act 1909 | 9 Edw. 7. c. lxxxiv | 16 August 1909 |
An Act for conferring further powers upon the Great Western Railway Company in respect of their own undertaking and upon that Company and the Midland Railway Company in respect of an undertaking in which they are jointly interested and upon the Bala and Festiniog Railway Company and the Weymouth and Portland Railway Company and for other purposes.
| Great Central Railway (Various Powers) Act 1909 | 9 Edw. 7. c. lxxxv | 16 August 1909 |
An Act to authorise the construction of new railways and works and the acquisition of additional lands by the Great Central Railway Company the construction of a street improvement in the city of Lincoln the acquisition of additional lands by the Manchester South Junction and Altrincham Railway Company the Seaforth and Sefton Junction Railway Company and the North Lindsey Light Railways Company the leasing of the Seaforth and Sefton Junction Railway to the Great Central Railway Company the raising of additional capital by the Great Central Railway Company and the Humber Commercial Railway and Dock Company and for other purposes.
| Collooney, Ballina and Belmullet Railways and Piers Act 1909 | 9 Edw. 7. c. lxxxvi | 16 August 1909 |
An Act to authorise the guarantee by the county councils of the counties of Sligo and Mayo and the urban district council of Ballina of dividends on portion of the capital of the Collooney Ballina and Belmullet Railways and Piers Company and for other purposes.
| Gas Light and Coke Company's Act 1909 | 9 Edw. 7. c. lxxxvii | 16 August 1909 |
An Act to authorise the acquisition by the Gas Light and Coke Company of the undertaking of the West Ham Gas Company to confer further powers on the Gas Light and Coke Company and for other purposes.
| Watford Urban District Council Act 1909 | 9 Edw. 7. c. lxxxviii | 16 August 1909 |
An Act to confer further powers upon the Watford Urban District Council in relation to their water and electricity undertakings and to make further provision for the local government of the district.
| Oldham Corporation Act 1909 | 9 Edw. 7. c. lxxxix | 16 August 1909 |
An Act to authorise the Corporation of Oldham to construct additional waterworks tramways and street improvements to confer further powers with respect to the supply of gas and electricity to make further provision for the health local government and improvement of the borough and for other purposes.
| Mountain Ash Urban District Council Act 1909 | 9 Edw. 7. c. xc | 16 August 1909 |
An Act to confer further powers on the urban district council of Mountain Ash in relation to their gas water and electricity undertakings and to make further and better provision with regard to the improvement health and local government of the district and for other purposes.
| Stourbridge and District Water Board Act 1909 | 9 Edw. 7. c. xci | 16 August 1909 |
An Act to constitute and incorporate a water board consisting of representatives from the councils of the urban districts of Stourbridge and Lye and Wollescote in the county of Worcester and of the urban district of Amblecote and of the rural district of Kingswinford in the county of Stafford and to transfer to and vest in such board the undertaking of the Stourbridge Waterworks Company Limited and to authorise the board to construct additional waterworks and for other purposes.
| Railway Rates and Charges (Weston, Clevedon and Portisland Light Railways) Order Confirmation Act 1909 (repealed) | 9 Edw. 7. c. xcii | 16 August 1909 |
An Act to confirm a Provisional Order made by the Board of Trade under the Railway and Canal Traffic Act 1888 (Note: Railway and Canal Traffic Act 1888 (51 & 52 Vict. c. 25)) relating to the classification of merchandise traffic and the schedule of maximum rates and charges applicable thereto of the Weston Clevedon and Portishead Light Railways Company. (Repealed by Statute Law (Repeals) Act 2013 (c. 2))
| | Railway Rates and Charges (Weston, Clevedon and Portisland Light Railways) Order 1909 | |
| Education Board Provisional Order Confirmation (London No. 1) Act 1909 | 9 Edw. 7. c. xciii | 16 August 1909 |
An Act to confirm a Provisional Order made by the Board of Education under the Education Acts 1870 to 1907 to enable the London County Council to put in force the Lands Clauses Acts.
| | London County County Council (No. 1) Order 1909 | |
| Education Board Provisional Order Confirmation (London No. 2) Act 1909 | 9 Edw. 7. c. xciv | 16 August 1909 |
An Act to confirm a Provisional Order made by the Board of Education under the Education Acts 1870 to 1907 to enable the London County Council to put in force the Lands Clauses Acts.
| | London County County Council (No. 2) Order 1909 | |
| Education Board Provisional Orders Confirmation (Bucks., &c.) Act 1909 | 9 Edw. 7. c. xcv | 16 August 1909 |
An Act to confirm certain Provisional Orders made by the Board of Education under the Education Acts 1870 to 1907 to enable the Councils of the Administrative Counties of Buckingham Cornwall Gloucester Montgomery and Surrey to put in force the Lands Clauses Acts.
| | Buckinghamshire County Council Order 1909 | |
| | Cornwall County Council Order 1909 | |
| | Gloucestershire County Council Order 1909 | |
| | Montgomery County Council Order 1909 | |
| | Surrey County Council Order 1909 | |
| Land Drainage Provisional Order Confirmation (No. 1) Act 1909 | 9 Edw. 7. c. xcvi | 16 August 1909 |
An Act to confirm a Provisional Order under the Land Drainage Act 1861 in the matter of a proposed drainage district in the parish of Owston in the county of Lincoln.
| | Land Drainage (Lincoln) Order 1909 | |
| Musselburgh Gas Order Confirmation Act 1909 | 9 Edw. 7. c. xcvii | 16 August 1909 |
An Act to confirm a Provisional Order under the Private Legislation Procedure (Scotland) Act 1899 relating to Musselburgh Gas.
| | Musselburgh Gas Order 1909 | |
| Musselburgh Corporation (Extension of Boundaries, &c) Order Confirmation Act 1909 | 9 Edw. 7. c. xcviii | 16 August 1909 |
An Act to confirm a Provisional Order under the Private Legislation Procedure (Scotland) Act 1899 relating to Musselburgh Corporation.
| | Musselburgh Corporation (Extension of Boundaries, &c.) Order 1909 | |
| Caledonian Railway Order Confirmation Act 1909 | 9 Edw. 7. c. xcix | 16 August 1909 |
An Act to confirm a Provisional Order under the Private Legislation Procedure (Scotland) Act 1899 relating to the Caledonian Railway.
| | Caledonian Railway Order 1909 | |
| Glasgow Hospital for Skin Diseases Order Confirmation Act 1909 | 9 Edw. 7. c. c | 16 August 1909 |
An Act to confirm a Provisional Order under the Private Legislation Procedure (Scotland) Act 1899 relating to the Glasgow Hospital for Skin Diseases.
| | Glasgow Hospital for Skin Diseases Order 1909 | |
| Merchants House of Glasgow (Buchanan and Ewing Bequests) Order Confirmation Act 1909 | 9 Edw. 7. c. ci | 16 August 1909 |
An Act to confirm a Provisional Order under the Private Legislation Procedure (Scotland) Act 1899 relating to the Merchants House of Glasgow (Buchanan and Ewing Bequests).
| | Merchants House of Glasgow (Buchanan and Ewing) Bequests Order 1909 | |
| Board of Education Scheme (Cheshunt College) Confirmation Act 1909 | 9 Edw. 7. c. cii | 16 August 1909 |
An Act to confirm a Scheme approved and certified by the Board of Education under the Charitable Trusts Act 1853 (Note: Charitable Trusts Act 1853 (16 & 17 Vict. c. 137)) relating to Cheshunt College.
| | Cheshunt College Scheme. | |
| Local Government Board (Ireland) Provisional Orders Confirmation (No. 1) Act 1909 | 9 Edw. 7. c. ciii | 16 August 1909 |
An Act to confirm certain Provisional Orders of the Local Government Board for Ireland relating to the rural districts of Castlereagh Midleton and Naas No. 1 and the Foranwell Drainage District in the county of Kildare.
| | Castlereagh (Cregagh Sewerage) Order 1909 | |
| | Midleton (Castlemartyr and Mogeely) Waterworks Order 1909 | |
| | Naas No. 1 (Sallins Water) Order 1909 | |
| | County of Kildare (Foranwell Drainage) Order 1909 | |
| Local Government Board (Ireland) Provisional Orders Confirmation (No. 2) Act 1909 | 9 Edw. 7. c. civ | 16 August 1909 |
An Act to confirm certain Provisional Orders of the Local Government Board for Ireland relating to the city of Dublin the Londonderry Port Sanitary Authority and the urban district of Queenstown.
| | City of Dublin Order 1909 | |
| Local Government Board (Ireland) Provisional Order Confirmation (No. 3) Act 1909 | 9 Edw. 7. c. cv | 16 August 1909 |
An Act to confirm a Provisional Order of the Local Government Board for Ireland relating to the Gorteen Drainage District in the county of Kildare.
| | County of Kildare (Gorteen Drainage) Order 1909 | |
| Great North of Scotland Railway Order Confirmation Act 1909 | 9 Edw. 7. c. cvi | 16 August 1909 |
An Act to confirm a Provisional Order under the Private Legislation Procedure (Scotland) Act 1899 relating to the Great North of Scotland Railway.
| | Great North of Scotland Railway Order 1909 | |
| Gas Orders Confirmation (No. 1) Act 1909 | 9 Edw. 7. c. cvii | 16 August 1909 |
An Act to confirm certain Provisional Orders made by the Board of Trade under the Gas and Water Works Facilities Act 1870 (Note: Gas and Water Works Facilities Act 1870 (33 & 34 Vict. c. 70)) relating to Bideford Gas Bude Gas Comber Gas Compstall Gas and Hayfield Gas.
| | Bideford Gas Order 1909 | |
| | Bude Gas Order 1909 | |
| | Comber Gas Order 1909 | |
| | Compstall Gas Order 1909 | |
| | Hayfield Gas Order 1909 | |
| Gas Orders Confirmation (No. 2) Act 1909 | 9 Edw. 7. c. cviii | 16 August 1909 |
An Act to confirm certain Provisional Orders made by the Board of Trade under the Gas and Water Works Facilities Act 1870 relating to Brough Elloughton and District Gas Langley Mill and Heanor Gas Long Eaton Gas Settle Gas and Sutton and Hooton District Gas.
| | Brough Elloughton and District Gas Order 1909 | |
| | Langley Mill and Heanor Gas Order 1909 | |
| | Long Eaton Gas Order 1909 | |
| | Settle Gas Order 1909 | |
| | Sutton and Hooton District Gas Order 1909 | |
| Electric Lighting Order Confirmation (No. 2) Act 1909 (repealed) | 9 Edw. 7. c. cix | 16 August 1909 |
An Act to confirm a Provisional Order made by the Board of Trade under the Electric Lighting Acts 1882 (Note: Electric Lighting Act 1882 (45 & 46 Vict. c. 56)) and 1888 (Note: Electric Lighting Act 1888 (51 & 52 Vict. c. 12)) the Electric Lighting (Scotland) Act 1890 (Note: Electric Lighting (Scotland) Act 1890 (53 & 54 Vict. c. 13)) and the Electric Lighting (Scotland) Act 1902 (Note: Electric Lighting (Scotland) Act 1902 (2 Edw. 7. c. 35)) relating to Dumfermline and District. (Repealed by South of Scotland Electricity Order Confirmation Act 1956 (4 & 5 Eliz. 2. c. xciv))
| | Dunfirmline and District Electric Lighting (Amendment) Order 1906 Provisional Order granted by the Board of Trade under the Electric Lighting Acts 1882 and 1888 the Electric Lighting (Scotland) Act 1890 and the Electric Lighting (Scotland) Act 1902 to the Provost Magistrates and Councillors of the Royal Burgh of Dunfermline in the County of Fife amending the Dunfermline and District Electric Lighting Order 1906. | |
| St. Andrews Water Order Confirmation Act 1909 | 9 Edw. 7. c. cx | 16 August 1909 |
An Act to confirm a Provisional Order under the Private Legislation Procedure (Scotland) Act 1899 relating to St. Andrews Water.
| | St. Andrews Water Order 1909 Provisional Order to authorise the Provost Magistrates and Councillors of the Burgh of St. Andrews to provide an additional water supply and to construct and maintain new waterworks and for other purposes. | |
| Edinburgh Merchant Company Endowments Order Confirmation Act 1909 | 9 Edw. 7. c. cxi | 16 August 1909 |
An Act to confirm a Provisional Order under the Private Legislation Procedure (Scotland) Act 1899 relating to Merchant Company Endowments.
| | Edinburgh Merchants Company Endowments Order 1909 | |
| Ardrossan Harbour Order Confirmation Act 1909 | 9 Edw. 7. c. cxii | 16 August 1909 |
An Act to confirm a Provisional Order under the Private Legislation Procedure (Scotland) Act 1899 relating to Ardrossan Harbour.
| | Ardrossan Harbour Order 1909 Provisional Order to confer further powers on the Ardrossan Harbour Company with respect to the charging of tolls rates and charges at the harbour of Ardrossan and for other purposes. | |
| Gas Provisional Order Act 1909 | 9 Edw. 7. c. cxiii | 16 August 1909 |
An Act to confer a Provisional Order made by the Board of Trade under the Gas and Water Works Facilities Act 1870 relating to Fermoy Gas.
| | Fermoy Gas Order 1909 Order empowering the Fermoy Gas Company Limited to maintain and continue gasworks and to manufacture and supply gas within the urban district of Fermoy and adjacent parishes in the East Riding of the County of Cord and for other purposes. | |
| Pier and Harbour Order Confirmation (No. 1) Act 1909 | 9 Edw. 7. c. cxiv | 16 August 1909 |
An Act to confirm a Provisional Order made by the Board of Trade under the General Pier and Harbour Act 1861 (Note: General Pier and Harbour Act 1861 (24 & 25 Vict. c. 45)) relating to Tralee and Fenit.
| | Tralee and Fenit Pier and Harbour Order 1909 Provisional Order for the construction and maintenance of new works at Fenit in the county of Kerry for enabling the Tralee and Fenit Pier and Harbour Commissioners to accept free grants and for other purposes. | |
| Pier and Harbour Orders Confirmation (No. 2) Act 1909 | 9 Edw. 7. c. cxv | 16 August 1909 |
An Act to confirm a Provisional Order made by the Board of Trade under the General Pier and Harbour Act 1861 relating to Bognor Herne Bay and Truro.
| | Bognor Pier Order 1909 Provisional Order for the maintenance and management of the Bognor Pier in the county of Sussex for authorising widening thereof for repealing the Bognor Pier Orders 1893 and 1895 and for other purposes. | |
| | Herne Bay Pier Order 1909 Provisional Order for the transfer of the undertaking of the Herne Bay Pier Company Limited to the Urban District Council of Herne Bay and for other purposes in connexion therewith. | |
| | Truro Harbour Order 1909 Provisional Order for the amendment of the Truro Harbour Order 1903 and for conferring further powers upon the Mayor Aldermen and Citizens of the City of Truro in the county of Cornwall in relation to Truro Harbour. | |
| Local Government Board's Provisional Order Confirmation (Poor Law) Act 1909 | 9 Edw. 7. c. cxvi | 16 August 1909 |
An Act to confirm a Provisional Order of the Local Government Board relating to Southampton.
| | Southampton (Poor Law) Order 1909 Provisional Order for repealing the Local Act 13 George III. Chapter 50. (Note: Southampton Poor Relief Act 1772 (13 Geo. 3. c. 50)) | |
| Local Government Board's Provisional Orders Confirmation (No. 1) Act 1909 | 9 Edw. 7. c. cxvii | 16 August 1909 |
An Act to confirm certain Provisional Orders of the Local Government Board relating to Bridlington Dorking Newport Pagnell (Rural) and Totnes.
| | Bridlington Order 1909 Provisional Order to enable the Urban District Council for the Borough of Bridlington to put in force the Compulsory Clauses of the Lands Clauses Acts. | |
| | Dorking Order 1909 Provisional Order to enable the Urban District Council of Dorking to put in force the Compulsory Clauses of the Lands Clauses Acts. | |
| | Newport Pagnell Rural Order 1909 Provisional Order to enable the Rural District Council of Newport Pagnell to put in force the compulsory Clauses of the Lands Clauses Acts. | |
| | Totnes Order 1909 Provisional Order to enable the Urban District Council for the Borough of Totnes to put in force the Compulsory Clauses of the Lands Clauses Acts. | |
| Local Government Board's Provisional Orders Confirmation (No. 2) Act 1909 | 9 Edw. 7. c. cxviii | 16 August 1909 |
An Act to confirm certain Provisional Orders of the Local Government Board relating to Derby Oswaldtwistle Wallasey and Walsall.
| | Derby Order 1909 Provisional Order for altering the Derby Corporation Act 1877 (Note: Derby Corporation Act 1877 (40 & 41 Vict. c. cxviii)) and the Local Government Board's Provisional Orders Confirmation (No. 14) Act 1896. (Note: Local Government Board's Provisional Orders Confirmation (No. 14) Act 1896 (59 & 60 Vict. c. cviii)) | |
| | Oswaldtwistle Order 1909 Provisional Order for altering the Oswaldtwistle Local Board Act 1896 (Note: Oswaldtwistle Local Board Act 1896 (32 & 33 Vict. c. lxvi)) the Local Government Board's Provisional Orders Confirmation (Aberavon &c.) Act 1880 (Note: Local Government Board's Provisional Orders Confirmation (Aberavon &c.) Act 1880 (43 & 44 Vict. c. lxxxvi)) the Local Government Board's Provisional Orders Confirmation (No. 2) Act 1888 (Note: Local Government Board's Provisional Orders Confirmation (No. 2) Act 1888 (51 & 52 Vict. c. xl)) the Local Government Board's Provisional Orders Confirmation Act 1892 (Note: Local Government Board's Provisional Orders Confirmation Act 1892 (55 & 56 Vict. c. lxviii) and the Local Government Board's Provisional Orders Confirmation (No. 2) Act 1898. (Note: Local Government Board's Provisional Orders Confirmation (No. 2) Act 1898 (61 & 62 Vict. c. xxxii)) | |
| | Wallasey Order 1909 Provisional Order for the alteration of the Wallasey Improvement Act 1858 (Note: Wallasey Improvement Act 1858 (21 & 22 Vict. c. lxiii)) the Wallasey Improvement Act 1861 (Note: Wallasey Improvement Act 1861 (24 & 25 Vict. c. iv)) the Wallasey Improvement Act 1864 (Note: Wallasey Improvement Act 1864 (27 & 28 Vict. c. cxvii)) the Wallasey Improvement Act 1867 (Note: Wallasey Improvement Act 1867 (30 & 31 Vict. c. cxxxii)) the Wallasey Improvement Act 1872 (Note: Wallasey Improvement Act 1872 (35 & 36 Vict. c. cxxv)) and the Wallasey Improvement Act 1901 (Note: Wallasey Improvement Act 1901 (1 Edw. 7. c. cclxi)) and certain Confirming Acts. | |
| | Walsall Order 1909 Provisional Order for altering the Walsall Improvement and Market Act 1848. (Note: Walsall Improvement and Market Act 1848 (11 & 12 Vict. c. clxi)) | |
| Local Government Board's Provisional Orders Confirmation (No. 3) Act 1909 | 9 Edw. 7. c. cxix | 16 August 1909 |
An Act to confirm certain Provisional Orders of the Local Government Board relating to relating to Cardiff Fulwood and Newport (Monmouth).
| | Cardiff Order 1909 Provisional Order for partially repealing and altering the Cardiff Corporation Act 1884 (Note: Cardiff Corporation Act 1884 (47 & 48 Vict. c. ccxxii)) the Cardiff Corporation Act 1894 (Note: Cardiff Corporation Act 1894 (57 & 58 Vict. c. clxi)) the Cardiff Corporation Act 1898 (Note: Cardiff Corporation Act 1898 (61 & 62 Vict. c. cxxviii)) and the Cardiff Corporation Act 1901. (Note: Cardiff Corporation Act 1901 (1 Edw. 7. c. lx)) | |
| | Fulwood Order 1909 Provisional Order for altering the Fulwood Local Board (Water) Act 1894. (Note: Fulwood Local Board (Water) Act 1894 (57 & 58 Vict. c. lviii)) | |
| | Newport (Monmouthshire) Order 1909 Provisional Order for partially repealing and altering the Newport (Monmouthshire) Corporation Act 1889. (Note: Newport (Monmouthshire) Corporation Act 1889 (52 & 53 Vict. c. clii)) | |
| Local Government Board's Provisional Orders Confirmation (No. 4) Act 1909 | 9 Edw. 7. c. cxx | 16 August 1909 |
An Act to confirm certain Provisional Orders of the Local Government Board relating to Bexhill Liversedge Warrington Widnes and Worcester.
| | Bexhill Order 1909 Provisional Order to enable the Urban District Council for the Borough of Bexhill to put in force the Compulsory Clauses of the Lands Clauses Acts. | |
| | Liversedge Order 1909 Provisional Order to enable the Urban District Council of Liversedge to put in force the Compulsory Clauses of the Lands Clauses Acts. | |
| | Warrington Order 1909 Provisional Order to enable the Urban Sanitary Authority for the Borough of Warrington to put in force the Compulsory Clauses of the Lands Clauses Acts. | |
| | Widnes Order 1909 Provisional Order to enable the Urban District Council for the Borough of Widnes to put in force the Compulsory Clauses of the Lands Clauses Acts. | |
| | Worcester Order 1909 Provisional Order to enable the Urban Sanitary Authority for the City of Worcester to put in force the Compulsory Clauses of the Lands Clauses Acts. | |
| Local Government Board's Provisional Orders Confirmation (No. 5) Act 1909 | 9 Edw. 7. c. cxxi | 16 August 1909 |
An Act to confirm certain Provisional Orders of the Local Government Board relating to Kendal Milton Regis Surbiton the Isle of Wight Joint Hospital District the Scunthorpe and Crosby Joint Sewerage District and the District of the Accrington District Gas and Water Board.
| | Kendal Order 1909 Provisional Order for altering the Kendal Corporation Gas and Water Act 1894. (Note: Kendal Corporation Gas and Water Act 1894 (57 & 58 Vict. c. lxxviii)) | |
| | Milton Regis Order 1909 Provisional Order for altering the Milton next Sittingbourne Improvement Act 1838 (Note: Milton-next-Sittingbourne Improvement Act 1838 (1 & 2 Vict. c. ii)) and certain Confirming Acts. | |
| | Surbiton Order 1909 Provisional Order for altering the Surbiton Improvement Act 1855. (Note: Surbiton Improvement Act 1855 (18 & 19 Vict. c. xxxvi)) | |
| | Isle of Wight Joint Hospital Order 1909 Provisional Order for forming a United District under Section 279 of the Public Health Act 1875. (Note: Public Health Act 1875 (38 & 39 Vict. c. 55)) | |
| | Scunthorpe and Crosby Joint Sewerage Order 1909 Provisional Order for forming a United District under Section 279 of the Public Health Act 1875. | |
| | Accrington District Gas and Water Board Order 1909 Provisional Order for altering the Accrington District Gas and Water Board Act 1894. (Note: Accrington District Gas and Water Board Act 1894 (57 & 58 Vict. c. cxxxiv)) | |
| Local Government Board's Provisional Orders Confirmation (No. 7) Act 1909 | 9 Edw. 7. c. cxxii | 16 August 1909 |
An Act to confirm certain Provisional Orders of the Local Government Board relating to Birmingham and Wakefield.
| | Birmingham (Extension) Order 1909 Provisional Order made in pursuance of Sections 54 and 59 of the Local Government Act 1888. (Note: Local Government Act 1888 (51 & 52 Vict. c. 41)) | |
| | Wakefield (Extension) Order 1909 Provisional Order made in pursuance of Sections 54 and 59 of the Local Government Act 1888. | |
| Local Government Board's Provisional Orders Confirmation (No. 8) Act 1909 | 9 Edw. 7. c. cxxiii | 16 August 1909 |
An Act to confirm certain Provisional Orders of the Local Government Board relating to Birkenhead Coventry and the Oakwell Joint Hospital District.
| | Birkenhead Order 1909 Provisional Order for partially repealing and altering the Birkenhead Corporation Act 1881 (Note: Birkenhead Corporation Act 1881 (44 & 45 Vict. c. cliii)) the Birkenhead Corporation (Gas and Water) Act 1881 (Note: Birkenhead Corporation (Gas and Water) Act 1881 (44 & 45 Vict. c. clii)) and the Birkenhead Corporation (Gas and Water) Act 1890. (Note: Birkenhead Corporation (Gas and Water) Act 1890 (53 & 54 Vict. c. xviii)) | |
| | Coventry Order 1909 Provisional Order for partially repealing and altering the Coventry Corporation Gas Acts 1856 to 1898. | |
| | Oakwell Joint Hospital Order 1909 Provisional Order for altering certain Confirming Acts. | |
| Local Government Board's Provisional Orders Confirmation (Gas) Act 1909 | 9 Edw. 7. c. cxxiv | 16 August 1909 |
An Act to confirm certain Provisional Orders of the Local Government Board relating to Ilkeston and Ynyscynhaiarn.
| | Ilkeston Gas Order 1909 Provisional Order under the Gas and Water Works Facilities Act 1870 and the Gas and Water Works Facilities Act 1870 Amendment Act 1873. (Note: Gas and Water Works Facilities Act 1870 Amendment Act 1873 (36 & 37 Vict. c. 89)) | |
| | Ynyscynhaiarn Gas Order 1909 Provisional Order under the Gas and Water Works Facilities Act 1870 and the Gas and Water Works Facilities Act 1870 Amendment Act 1873. | |
| Provisional Order (Marriages) Confirmation Act 1909 (repealed) | 9 Edw. 7. c. cxxv | 16 August 1909 |
An Act to confirm a Provisional Order made by one of His Majesty's Principal Secretaries of State under the Provisional Order (Marriages) Act 1905. (Note: Provisional Order (Marriages) Act 1905 (5 Edw. 7. c. 23)) (Repealed by Statute Law (Repeals) Act 1977 (c. 18))
| | St. James New Bradwell Order. | |
| Metropolitan Commons Scheme Confirmation Act 1909 | 9 Edw. 7. c. cxxvi | 16 August 1909 |
An Act to confirm a Scheme under the Metropolitan Commons Acts 1866 to 1898 with respect to Keston Common and Leaves Green in the county of Kent.
| | Scheme with respect to Keston Common and Leaves Green Kent. | |
| Sea Fisheries (Tees) Provisional Order Confirmation Act 1909 | 9 Edw. 7. c. cxxvii | 16 August 1909 |
An Act to confirm an Order under the Sea Fisheries Acts 1843 to 1893 for the improvement maintenance and regulation of an oyster mussel and cockle fishery in the estuary of the River Tees.
| | Tees Fishery Order 1909 Order for the improvement. maintenance and regulation of an oyster mussel and cockle fishery in the estuary of the River Tees. | |
| Remission of Surcharges (Dublin) Act 1909 | 9 Edw. 7. c. cxxviii | 16 August 1909 |
An Act to discharge certain surcharges made upon the accounts of the Municipal Corporation of Dublin.
| Greenock Corporation Act 1909 | 9 Edw. 7. c. cxxix | 16 August 1909 |
An Act to extend the municipal and police boundaries of the burgh of Greenock to consolidate the Local Acts and Orders relating to that burgh to confer further powers on the provost magistrates and councillors thereof and for other purposes.
| London County Council (General Powers) Act 1909 | 9 Edw. 7. c. cxxx | 16 August 1909 |
An Act to empower the London County Council to construct railway sidings in the county of Surrey and to confer other powers upon that Council to make provisions with respect to sanitary matters to amend the London Building Acts to confer powers upon the councils of the metropolitan borough of Southwark and the royal borough of Kensington and for other purposes.
| Heywood Corporation Act 1909 | 9 Edw. 7. c. cxxxi | 16 August 1909 |
An Act to make further and better provision with regard to the tramway gas and electricity undertakings of the corporation of Heywood and the improvement health and local government of the borough and for other purposes.
| Prestatyn Urban District Council Act 1909 | 9 Edw. 7. c. cxxxii | 16 August 1909 |
An Act to confer upon the Prestatyn Urban District Council powers in relation to the supply of gas and water and to make further provision for the local government health and improvement of the district.
| Risca Urban District Council Act 1909 | 9 Edw. 7. c. cxxxiii | 16 August 1909 |
An Act to transfer to and vest in the Council of the urban district of Risca the undertaking of the Western Valleys (Monmouthshire) Water and Gas Company to sanction and confirm the construction of existing waterworks and to authorise the Council to supply water and gas and for other purposes.
| Torquay and Paignton Tramways Act 1909 | 9 Edw. 7. c. cxxxiv | 16 August 1909 |
An Act to authorise the Torquay Tramways Company Limited to construct tramways in extension of the existing tramways in the borough of Torquay and for other purposes.
| Shrewsbury Corporation Act 1909 | 9 Edw. 7. c. cxxxv | 16 August 1909 |
An Act to authorise the Corporation of Shrewsbury to construct a weir on the River Severn and for other purposes.
| North Eastern Railway Act 1909 | 9 Edw. 7. c. cxxxvi | 20 September 1909 |
An Act to confer additional powers upon the North Eastern Railway Company for the construction of new railways and other works and the acquisition of lands and for other purposes.
| Glasgow Corporation Act 1909 | 9 Edw. 7. c. cxxxvii | 20 September 1909 |
An Act to make provision with reference to the preparation auditing and publication of the annual accounts of the Corporation of the city of Glasgow to authorise the Corporation to construct new tramways to increase the assessment for sewage purposes to borrow further moneys for the purposes of the Glasgow Tramways Acts 1905 to 1907 the Glasgow Corporation Parks Acts 1878 to 1905 and the Glasgow Sewage Acts 1891 to 1907 and to extend the boundaries of the city and for other purposes.
| Dunoon Burgh Act 1909 (repealed) | 9 Edw. 7. c. cxxxviii | 20 September 1909 |
An Act to authorise the provost magistrates and councillors of the burgh of Dunoon to make charges for admission to the Castle Gardens and concerts therein to make provision for preserving the amenity of the seashore and for other purposes. (Repealed by Dunoon Burgh Order Confirmation Act 1954 (2 & 3 Eliz. 2. c. xxiii))
| Taff Vale Railway Act 1909 | 9 Edw. 7. c. cxxxix | 20 September 1909 |
An Act for conferring further powers on the Taff Vale Railway Company.
| Newry, Keady and Tynan Railway Act 1909 | 9 Edw. 7. c. cxl | 20 September 1909 |
An Act to empower the Newry Keady and Tynan Light Railway Company to construct new railways and to abandon portion of their authorised railways to revive and extend the time limited by the Newry Keady and Tynan Light Railway Act 1900 (Note: Newry, Keady and Tynan Light Railway Act 1900 (63 & 64 Vict. c. cclxxv)) the Ulster and Connaught Light Railways Act 1903 (Note: Ulster and Connaught Light Railways Act 1903 (3 Edw. 7. c. cclxii)) and the Newry Keady and Tynan Light Railway Act 1905 (Note: Newry, Keady and Tynan Light Railway Act 1905 (5 Edw. 7. c. ccvii)) for the compulsory purchase of lands for the purposes thereof and for the completion of the railways thereby authorised to change the name of the Company and for other purposes.
| Electric Lighting Orders Confirmation (No. 1) Act 1909 | 9 Edw. 7. c. cxli | 20 September 1909 |
An Act to confirm certain Provisional Orders made by the Board of Trade under the Electric Lighting Acts 1882 and 1888 relating to Chesham (Extension) Cleethorpes (Amendment) Herne Bay Hindhead and District (Extension) Holsworthy Southampton (Extension) Stains Stourbridge Turton and Walton-on-the-Naze.
| | Chesham Electric Lighting (Extension) Order 1909 Provisional Order granted by the Board of Trade under the Electric Lighting Acts 1882 and 1888 to the Chesham Electric Light and Power Company Limited in respect of an extension of their existing areas of supply to include the Urban District of Great Berkhampstead and portions of the Rural Districts of Berkhampstead and Amersham in the Counties of Hertford and Buckingham. | |
| | Cleethorpes Electric Lighting Order 1900 (Amendment) Order 1909 Provisional Order granted by the Board of Trade under the Electric Lighting Acts 1882 and 1888 to the Urban District Council of Cleethorpes for the amendment of the Cleethorpes Electric Lighting Order 1900. | |
| | Herne Bay Electric Lighting Order 1909 Provisional Order granted by the Board of Trade under the Electric Lighting Acts 1882 and 1888 to the Urban District Council of Herne Bay in respect of the Urban District of Herne Bay in the County of Kent. | |
| | Hindhead and District Electric Lighting (Extension) Order 1909 Provisional Order granted by the Board of Trade under the Electric Lighting Acts 1882 and 1888 to the Hindhead and District Electric Light Company Limited in respect of an extension of their existing area of supply to include portions of the Rural Districts of Farnham Hambledon Alton Petersfield and Midhurst in the Counties of Surrey Southampton and West Sussex. | |
| | Holsworthy Electric Lighting Order 1909 Provisional Order granted by the Board of Trade under the Electric Lighting Acts 1882 and 1888 toChristy Brothers and Company Limited in respect of the Urban District of Holsworthy in the County of Devon. | |
| | Southampton Electric Lighting (Extension) Order 1909 Provisional Order granted by the Board of Trade under the Electric Lighting Acts 1882 and 1888 to the Mayor Aldermen and Burgesses of the Borough of Southampton in respect of the parishes of South Stoneham and North Stoneham in the Rural District of South Stoneham in the County of Southampton. | |
| | Staines Electric Lighting Order 1909 Provisional Order granted by the Board of Trade under the Electric Lighting Acts 1882 and 1888 to Francis Stirling Powell trading as the Egham Electric Lighting Syndicate in respect of the Urban District of Staines in the County of Middlesex. | |
| | Stourbridge Electric Lighting Order 1909 Provisional Order granted by the Board of Trade under the Electric Lighting Acts 1882 and 1888 to the Urban District Council of Stourbridge in respect of the Urban District of Stourbridge in the County of Worcester. | |
| | Turton Electric Lighting Order 1909 Provisional Order granted by the Board of Trade under the Electric Lighting Acts 1882 and 1888 to the Urban District Council of Turton in respect of the Urban District of Turton in the County Palatine of Lancaster. | |
| | Walton-on-the-Naze Electric Lighting Order 1909 Provisional Order granted by the Board of Trade under the Electric Lighting Acts 1882 and 1888 to the Coast Development Corporation Limited in respect of the Urban District of Walton-on-the-Naze in the County of Essex. | |
| Gas and Water Orders Confirmation Act 1909 | 9 Edw. 7. c. cxlii | 20 September 1909 |
An Act to confirm certain Provisional Orders made by the Board of Trade under the Gas and Water Works Facilities Act 1870 relating to Coatbridge Gas Llynvi Valley Gas Bradfield Water Gravesend and Milton Water and Hungerford Water.
| | Coatbridge Gas Order 1909 Order authorising the Coatbridge Gas Company to reduce the illuminating power of their gas and for other purposes. | |
| | Llynvi Valley Gas Order 1909 Order empowering the Llynvi Valley Gas Company to raise new capital and for other purposes. | |
| | Bradfield Water Order 1909 Order empowering the Undertakers of the Bradfield Waterworks to construct and maintain additional waterworks to extend their limits of supply to increase the capital of the undertaking and for other purposes. | |
| | Gravesend and Milton Water Order 1909 Order empowering the Gravesend and Milton Waterworks Company to construct additional works to raise additional capital and amending the scale of charges for supply of water and for other purposes. | |
| | Hungerford Water Order 1909 Order authorising the maintenance and user of existing works and the acquisition of additional lands in the parish of Hungerford in the county of Berkshire and for other purposes. | |
| Tramways Orders Confirmation Act 1909 | 9 Edw. 7. c. cxliii | 20 September 1909 |
An Act to confirm certain Provisional Orders made by the Board of Trade under the Tramways Act 1870 (Note: Tramways Act 1870 (33 & 34 Vict. c. 78)) relating to Bolton Corporation Tramways Keighley Corporation Tramways Morecambe Corporation Tramways Portsmouth Corporation Tramways and Whitworth Urban District Council Tramways.
| | Bolton Corporation Tramways Order 1909 Order authorising the Mayor Aldermen and Burgesses of the County Borough of Bolton to construct additional tramways in the said borough. | |
| | Keighley Corporation Tramways Order 1909 Order authorising the Mayor Aldermen and Burgesses of the Borough of Keighley to construct additional tramways in the said borough. | |
| | Morecambe Corporation Tramways Order 1909 Order authorising the Corporation of Morecambe to construct and work tramways in Borough of Morecambe and for other purposes. | |
| | Portsmouth Corporation Tramways Order 1909 Order authorising the Mayor Aldermen and Burgesses of the Borough of Portsmouth to construct additional tramways in the said borough. | |
| | Whitworth Urban District Council Tramways Order 1909 Order authorising the Urban District Council of the Urban District of Whitworth to construct tramways in their district. | |
| Buckie Burgh and Buckie (Cluny) Harbour Order Confirmation Act 1909 (repealed) | 9 Edw. 7. c. cxliv | 20 September 1909 |
An Act to confirm a Provisional Order made under the Private Legislation Procedure (Scotland) Act 1899 relating to Buckie Burgh and Buckie (Cluny) Harbour, (Repealed by Grampian Regional Council (Harbours) Order Confirmation Act 1987 (c. x))
| | Buckie Burgh and Buckie (Cluny) Harbour Order 1909 Provisional Order to empower the Provost Magistrates and Councillors of the Burgh of Buckie in the County of Banff to construct additional Harbour Works at the Buckie (Cluny) Harbour to authorise the Town Council to borrow money for the purposes of the said Harbour to apply the special Cluny Harbour rate authorised by the Buckie Burgh and Buckie (Cluny) Harbour Order 1908 for the purposes of this Order and to confer further powers on the Town Council with reference to the said Harbour and Works and for other purposes. | |
| Aberdeen Harbour Order Confirmation Act 1909 (repealed) | 9 Edw. 7. c. cxlv | 20 September 1909 |
An Act to confirm a Provisional Order made under the Private Legislation Procedure (Scotland) Act 1899 relating to Aberdeen Harbour. (Repealed by Aberdeen Harbour Order Confirmation Act 1960 (9 & 10 Eliz. 2. c. i))
| | Aberdeen Harbour Order 1909 Provisional Order to confer further powers upon the Aberdeen Harbour Commissioners. | |
| Clydebank and District Water Order Confirmation Act 1909 | 9 Edw. 7. c. cxlvi | 20 September 1909 |
An Act to confirm a Provisional Order made under the Private Legislation Procedure (Scotland) Act 1899 relating to Clydebank and District Water.
| | Clydebank and District Water Order 1909 Provisional Order to authorise the Clydebank and District Water Trustees to construct additional Works to make deviations of authorised Works to extend the time for the purchase of lands and construction of Works to acquire additional lands to abandon parts of authorised Works and for other purposes. | |
| Irvine Harbour Order Confirmation Act 1909 | 9 Edw. 7. c. cxlvii | 20 October 1909 |
An Act to confirm a Provisional Order made under the Private Legislation Procedure (Scotland) Act 1899 relating to Irvine Harbour.
| | Irvine Harbour Order 1909 Provisional Order to confer further powers on the Irvine Harbour Trustees with respect to tolls rates and charges at the harbour of Irvine and for other purposes. | |
| Whittington Charity Scheme Confirmation Act 1909 (repealed) | 9 Edw. 7. c. cxlviii | 20 October 1909 |
An Act to confirm a Scheme of the Charity Commissioners for the management of the Charity of Sir Richard Whittington under the management of the Mercers' Company of the City of London. (Repealed by Statute Law (Repeals) Act 2013 (c. 2))
| | Scheme for the Application or Management of the Charity of Sir Richard Whittington under the management of the Mercers' Company of the City of London. | |
| Bridgend Hope English Baptist Chapel Scheme Confirmation Act 1909 | 9 Edw. 7. c. cxlix | 20 October 1909 |
An Act to confirm a Scheme of the Charity Commissioners for the management of (1) The Charity consisting of the proceeds of the sale of Hope English Baptist Chapel in Queen Street in the township of Bridgend in the parish of Coity in the county of Glamorgan and (2) The Charity consisting of the Hope English Baptist Sunday Schoolroom in Queen Street aforesaid.
| | Scheme for the Application or Management of—: 1. The Charity consisting of the Proceeds of the Sale of the Hope English Baptist Chapel in Queen Street in the Township of Bridgend in the Parish of Coity in the county of Glamorgan comprised in a Scheme of the Charity Commissioners of the 13th October 1908; and 2. The Charity consisting of the Hope English Baptist Sunday Schoolroom in Queen Street aforesaid comprised in a Scheme of the said Commissioners of the 16th October 1908. | |
| Marshall's Charity Scheme Confirmation Act 1909 | 9 Edw. 7. c. cl | 20 October 1909 |
An Act to confirm a Scheme of the Charity Commissioners for the management of the Charity of John Marshall.
| | Scheme for the Application or Management of the Charity of John Marshall. | |
| Lichfield and Longdon Congregational Chapels Scheme Confirmation Act 1909 | 9 Edw. 7. c. cli | 20 October 1909 |
An Act to confirm a Scheme of the Charity Commissioners for the management of the Charities consisting of the Congregational Chapel in Wade Street in the City of Lichfield and the Congregational Chapel at Longdon in the County of Stafford and the trust property held in connexion with such chapels.
| | Scheme for the Application or Management of the Charities consisting of the Congregational Chapel in Wade Street in the City of Lichfield and the Congregational Chapel at Longdon in the County of Stafford and the Trust Property held in connexion with the said respective Chapels. | |
| Dewsbury and Batley Congregational Chapels Scheme Confirmation Act 1909 | 9 Edw. 7. c. clii | 20 October 1909 |
An Act to confirm a Scheme of the Charity Commissioners for the management of the Charities consisting of the Trinity Congregational Chapel and the Ebenezer Congregational Chapel Burial Ground Caretaker's House and Mission Room in the parishes of Dewsbury and Batley in the West Riding of the County of York.
| | Scheme for the Application or Management of the following Charities in the parishes of Dewsbury and Batley in the West Riding of the County of Yorks:—: 1. The Charity consisting of the Trinity Congregational Chapel; and 2. The Charity consisting of the Ebenezer Congregational Chapel Burial Ground Caretaker's House and Mission Rooms. | |
| Wortley Congregational Chapel Scheme Confirmation Act 1909 | 9 Edw. 7. c. cliii | 20 October 1909 |
An Act to confirm a Scheme of the Charity Commissioners for the management of the Charity consisting of the Bethel Congregational Chapel and trust property at Wortley in the City of Leeds.
| | Wortley Congregational Chapel Scheme. | |
| Hamilton Burgh Order Confirmation Act 1909 | 9 Edw. 7. c. cliv | 20 October 1909 |
An Act to confirm a Provisional Order under the Private Legislation Procedure (Scotland) Act 1899 relating to Hamilton Burgh.
| | Hamilton Burgh Order 1909 Provisional Order to confer further powers on the Corporation of the Burgh of Hamilton in relation to their Electricity and Gas Undertakings to extend the period for the repayment of moneys borrowed for sewage purification purposes to confer powers on the Corporation in relation to the searching for and working of minerals to amend certain public and local Acts affecting the Burgh and for other purposes. | |
| Provisional Order (Marriages) Confirmation (No. 2) Act 1909 (repealed) | 9 Edw. 7. c. clv | 20 October 1909 |
An Act to confirm a Provisional Order made by one of His Majesty's Principal Secretaries of State under the Provisional Order (Marriages) Act 1905. (Repealed by Statute Law (Repeals) Act 1977 (c. 18))
| | Holy Trinity Calne Order. | |
| Local Government Board's Provisional Orders Confirmation (No. 9) Act 1909 | 9 Edw. 7. c. clvi | 20 October 1909 |
An Act to confirm certain Provisional Orders of the Local Government Board relating to Maryport the Hitchin Joint Hospital District and the Whaley Bridge Joint Sewerage District.
| | Maryport Order 1909 Provisional Order for partially repealing and altering the Maryport Improvement and Harbour Act 1866 (Note: Maryport Improvement and Harbour Act 1866 (29 & 30 Vict. c. ccxlv)) the Maryport District and Harbour Act 1868 (Note: Maryport District and Harbour Act 1868 (31 & 32 Vict. c. lxx)) the Maryport District and Harbour (Gas) Act 1877 (Note: Maryport District and Harbour (Gas) Act 1877 (40 & 41 Vict. c. xxxviii)) and the Maryport Improvement Act 1878 (Note: Maryport Improvement Act 1878 (41 & 42 Vict. c. cliii)) and a Confirming Act. (Note: Local Government Board's Provisional Orders Confirmation (No. 7) Act 1886 (50 Vict. c. xv)) | |
| | Hitchin Order 1909 Provisional Order for partially repealing a Confirming Act. (Note: Local Government Board's Provisional Orders Confirmation (No. 10) Act 1901 (1 Edw. 7. c. cli)) | |
| | Whaley Bridge Joint Sewerage Order 1909 Provisional Order for forming a United District under Section 279 of the Public Health Act 1875. | |
| Lune Fisheries Provisional Order Confirmation Act 1909 | 9 Edw. 7. c. clvii | 20 October 1909 |
An Act to confirm an Order under the Salmon and Freshwater Fisheries Act 1907 (Note: Salmon and Freshwater Fisheries Act 1907 (7 Edw. 7. c. 15)) relating to the River Lune and other waters.
| | Lune Fisheries Provisional Order 1909 Lune Fisheries Provisional Order 1909. | |
| Kilkenny, Castlecomer and Athy Railway Act 1909 | 9 Edw. 7. c. clviii | 20 October 1909 |
An Act for making a railway in the counties of Kilkenny Queen's County and Kildare to be called the Kilkenny Castlecomer and Athy Railway and for other purposes.
| Bury Corporation Act 1909 | 9 Edw. 7. c. clix | 20 October 1909 |
An Act to consolidate with amendments certain of the Local Acts in force within the county borough of Bury to make further provision in regard to the various undertakings of the corporation and to make better provision for the health and local government of the borough and for other purposes.
| Edgware and Hampstead Railway Act 1909 | 9 Edw. 7. c. clx | 20 October 1909 |
An Act to authorise a deviation of part of the Edgware and Hampstead Railway and to confer further powers on the Edgware and Hampstead Railway Company and for other purposes.
| Cardiff Corporation Act 1909 | 9 Edw. 7. c. clxi | 25 November 1909 |
An Act to empower the lord mayor aldermen and citizens of the city of Cardiff to construct and maintain additional waterworks and to make further provision for the improvement health and good government of the city and for other purposes.
| Local Government Board's Provisional Orders Confirmation (No. 6) Act 1909 | 9 Edw. 7. c. clxii | 25 November 1909 |
An Act to confirm certain Provisional Orders of the Local Government Board relating to Batley and Dewsbury.
| | Batley (Extension) Order 1909 Provisional Order made in pursuance of Sections 54 and 59 of the Local Government Act 1888. | |
| | Dewsbury (Extension) Order 1909 Provisional Order made in pursuance of Sections 54 and 59 of the Local Government Act 1888. | |
| Colinton Tramways Order Confirmation Act 1909 | 9 Edw. 7. c. clxiii | 25 November 1909 |
An Act to confirm a Provisional Order under the Private Legislation Procedure (Scotland) Act 1899 relating to Colinton Tramways.
| | Colinton Tramways Order 1909 Provisional Order incorporating the Colinton Tramways Company and empowering that Company to make and maintain tramways and other works and for other purposes. | |
| Robert Gordon's Technical College and Aberdeen Endowments Trust Order Confirmation Act 1909 | 9 Edw. 7. c. clxiv | 25 November 1909 |
An Act to confirm a Provisional Order under the Private Legislation Procedure (Scotland) Act 1899 relating to Robert Gordon's Technical College and Aberdeen Endowments Trust.
| | Robert Gordon's Technical College and Aberdeen Endowments Trust Order 1909 Provisional Order for establishing Robert Gordon's Technical College in Aberdeen for amalgamating the Endowments of Robert Gordon's College and the Aberdeen Educational Trust for constituting the Aberdeen Endowments Trust and transferring the Endowments to that Trust and for other purposes. | |

=== Private and personal acts ===
| Short title | Citation | Royal assent |
Long title
| Torrens' Divorce Act 1909 (Note: This act was not printed by the King's Printer) | 9 Edw. 7. c. 1 Pr. | 30 April 1909 |
An Act to dissolve the Marriage of James Robert Torrens with Enid Maud Torrens, his present wife, and to enable him to marry again, and for other purposes.

=== Sources ===
- 9 Edward VII - 1909 – via HathiTrust.

== See also ==
- List of acts of the Parliament of the United Kingdom
