= Financial Services and Markets Act 2000 =

Act of the Parliament of the United Kingdom

Financial Services and Markets Act 2000 (Note: Section 433.)
- Act of Parliament
- Parliament of the United Kingdom
- Long title: An Act to make provision about the regulation of financial services and markets; to provide for the transfer of certain statutory functions relating to building societies, friendly societies, industrial and provident societies and certain other mutual societies; and for connected purposes.
- Citation: 2000 c. 8
- Introduced by: Alan Milburn (Commons)
- Territorial extent: England and Wales; Scotland; Northern Ireland (in part).; (Note: Section 430.)

Dates
- Royal assent: 14 June 2000
- Commencement: 25 February 2001; 18 June 2001; 3 September 2001; 1 December 2001; (Note: Section 431.)
Other legislation
Amends	Friendly Societies Act 1974
Repeals/revokes	Industrial Assurance Act 1923; Industrial Assurance and Friendly Societies Act 1948
Amended by	Regulation of Investigatory Powers Act 2000; Counter-Terrorism Act 2008; Dormant Bank and Building Society Accounts Act 2008; Charities Act 2011; Financial Services Act 2012; Co-operative and Community Benefit Societies Act 2014; Pensions Act 2014; Bank of England and Financial Services Act 2016; Investigatory Powers Act 2016; Digital Economy Act 2017; Corporate Insolvency and Governance Act 2020; Sentencing Act 2020; Compensation (London Capital & Finance plc and Fraud Compensation Fund) Act 2021; Digital Markets, Competition and Consumers Act 2024; Pension Schemes Act 2026

Status: Amended

Text of statute as originally enacted

Revised text of statute as amended

The Financial Services and Markets Act 2000 (c. 8) is an act of the Parliament of the United Kingdom.

== Provisions ==
The act created the Financial Services Authority (FSA) as a regulator for insurance, investment business and banking. This made it the single regulator for the entire finance industry. The act created the Financial Ombudsman Service to resolve disputes as a free alternative to the courts, replacing 8 separate ombudsman schemes in different parts of the financial services industry.

The act was considerably amended by the Financial Services Act 2012, the Bank of England and Financial Services Act 2016 and the Financial Services and Markets Act 2023.

== Implementation ==
The act came into force on 1 December 2001.

== Reception ==
The bill as originally published was criticised by the a joint parliamentary committee over concerns that the enforcement regime it proposed was incompatible with the European Convention on Human Rights and the Human Rights Act 1998.

== See also ==
- European Union law
- Financial Services Act 1986
- Part VII transfer
- Ringfencing
- UK banking law
- UK commercial law
- UK company law
