= Tax Law Rewrite Project =

1996 British taxation reform project

The Tax Law Rewrite Project of HM Revenue and Customs was a major effort to re-write the entire tax legislation of the United Kingdom in a format which was both more consistent and more understandable.

== History ==
The project began in 1996. It aimed to remove archaic language and confusing terminology from tax law and to replace it with modern language and terminology.

The produced both primary and secondary legislation. In total, there were 7 acts passed based on the work of the project:

- Capital Allowances Act 2001
- Income Tax (Earnings and Pensions) Act 2003
- Income Tax (Trading and Other Income) Act 2005
- Income Tax Act 2007
- Corporation Tax Act 2009
- Corporation Tax Act 2010
- Taxation (International and Other Provisions) Act 2010

The project also led to the Income Tax (Pay as You Earn) Regulations 2003.

The project was closed in 2010, being replaced by the Office of Tax Simplification.

== Scrutiny ==
The legislation was scrutinized by the Joint Committee on Tax Law Rewrite Bills.
