= Corporation Tax Act =

Corporation Tax Act may refer to

- Corporation Tax Act 2009, an Act of the Parliament of the United Kingdom
- Corporation Tax Act 2010, an Act of the Parliament of the United Kingdom
