= PCTCT =

Measure of taxable profits used in the United Kingdom

In the United Kingdom tax system, and more specifically for UK corporation tax purposes, PCTCT stands for "profits chargeable to corporation tax," a UK term for taxable profits.

Since the enactment of 2010's Corporation Tax Act (CTA 2010) in March 2010, the profits of a company of an accounting period on which corporation tax is chargeable has been defined as the company's "taxable total profits" of the period (section 4(2) CTA 2010), which is frequently abbreviated to TTP.

A company's taxable total profits are derived from a company's profit as shown in the profit and loss account in its accounts, with the addition of any disallowed expenditure, and the deduction of any expenditure that is allowed for tax purposes but that has not been deducted in the profit and loss account.
