= Capital Allowances Act 2001 =

Act of the Parliament of the United Kingdom

Capital Allowances Act 2001 (Note: Section 581.)
- Act of Parliament
- Parliament of the United Kingdom
- Long title: An Act to restate, with minor changes, certain enactments relating to capital allowances.
- Citation: 2001 c. 2
- Territorial extent: United Kingdom

Dates
- Royal assent: 22 March 2001
- Commencement: chargeable periods ending on or after 6 April 2001 (income tax); chargeable periods ending on or after 1 April 2001 (corporation tax); (Note: Section 579.)
Other legislation
Amends	Trustee Savings Banks Act 1985; Social Security Contributions and Benefits Act 1992; Coal Industry Act 1994; See § Repealed enactments
Repeals/revokes	See § Repealed enactments
Amended by	List: Finance Act 2002; Income Tax (Earnings and Pensions) Act 2003; Finance Act 2003; Finance Act 2004; Fire and Rescue Services Act 2004; Overseas Life Insurance Companies Regulations 2004; Finance Act 2004, Sections 38 to 40 and 45 and Schedule 6 (Consequential Amendment of Enactments) Order 2004; Income Tax (Trading and Other Income) Act 2005; Finance Act 2005; Commissioners for Revenue and Customs Act 2005; Finance (No. 2) Act 2005; Fire (Scotland) Act 2005 (Consequential Modifications and Amendments) Order 2005; Regulatory Reform (Fire Safety) Order 2005; Finance Act 2006; Fire (Scotland) Act 2005 (Consequential Modifications and Savings) Order 2006; Fire and Rescue Services (Northern Ireland) Order 2006; Overseas Life Insurance Companies Regulations 2006; Water and Sewerage Services (Northern Ireland) Order 2006; Income Tax Act 2007; Finance Act 2007; Insurance Companies (Corporation Tax Acts) (Amendment) Order 2007; Corporation Tax (Implementation of the Mergers Directive) Regulations 2007; Finance Act 2008; Companies Act 2006 (Consequential Amendments) (Taxes and National Insurance) Order 2008; Corporation Tax Act 2009; Finance Act 2009; Transfer of Tribunal Functions and Revenue and Customs Appeals Order 2009; Corporation Tax Act 2010; Taxation (International and Other Provisions) Act 2010; Finance Act 2010; Finance (No. 3) Act 2010; Finance Act 2011; Planning Act (Northern Ireland) 2011; Treaty of Lisbon (Changes in Terminology) Order 2011; Welfare Reform Act 2012; Finance Act 2012; Statute Law (Repeals) Act 2013; Finance Act 2013; Capital Allowances (First-year Tax Credits) Order 2013; Finance Act 2014; Finance Act 2015; Corporation Tax (Northern Ireland) Act 2015; Finance (No. 2) Act 2015; Capital Allowances Act 2001 (Extension of first-year allowances) (Amendment) Order 2015; Solvency 2 Regulations 2015; Welfare Reform (Northern Ireland) Order 2015; Finance Act 2016; Petroleum (Transfer of Functions) Regulations 2016; Capital Allowances Act 2001 (Cars Emissions) Order 2016; Wales Act 2017; Finance (No. 2) Act 2017; Capital Allowances Act 2001 (Extension of First-year Allowances) (Amendment) Order 2017; Finance Act 2018; Scotland Act 2016 (Onshore Petroleum) (Consequential Amendments) Regulations 2018; Finance Act 2019; Taxes (Amendments) (EU Exit) Regulations 2019; Capital Allowances (Structures and Buildings Allowances) Regulations 2019; Finance Act 2020; Capital Allowances Act 2001 (Amendment of Section 45K) Order 2020; Taxes (State Aid) (Amendments) (EU Exit) Regulations 2020; Finance Act 2021; Capital Allowances Act 2001 (Car Emissions) (Extension of First-year Allowances) (Amendment) Order 2021; Social Security (Scotland) Act 2018 (Disability Assistance, Young Carer Grants, Short-term Assistance and Winter Heating Assistance) (Consequential Provision and Modifications) Order 2021; Finance Act 2022; Finance (No. 2) Act 2023; Finance Act 2024; Finance Act 2025; Renters' Rights Act 2025; Co-ownership Contractual Schemes (Tax) Regulations 2025; Planning (Consequential Provisions) (Wales) Act 2026; Finance Act 2026

Status: Amended

Text of statute as originally enacted

Revised text of statute as amended

The Capital Allowances Act 2001 (c. 2) is an act of the Parliament of the United Kingdom that governs how capital allowances are deducted from income taxable under the Income Tax Act 2007 and the Corporation Tax Act 2009.

== Types of allowances ==
Capital allowances fall under several categories:

- initial allowance (IA);
- annual investment allowance (AIA);
- first-year allowance (FYA);
- writing down allowance (WDA);
- balancing allowance.

Under the act, they are available for specified types of claims:

CAA 2001: available allowances
Part	Allowance	IA	AIA	FYA	WDA
2	plant and machinery		✓	✓	✓
3	industrial buildings	✓			✗
4	agricultural buildings				
4A	flat conversion				
5	mineral extraction				✓
6	research and development			✓	
7	know-how				✓
8	patents				✓
9	dredging				✓
10	assured tenancies				✓

== Provisions ==
The act contains the UK's capital allowances code. The act allows for capital allowances on certain assets including cars, long-life assets, and plant or machinery for leasing which did not qualify.

For example, Motability cars fall within the short-life asset regime under the act.

=== Repealed enactments ===
Section 580 of the act repealed 32 enactments, listed in schedule 4 to the act.

Citation	Short title	Extent of repeal
1970 c. 9	Taxes Management Act 1970	In section 98 in column 1 of the Table the words "Sections 23(4) and 49(4) of the Capital Allowances Act 1990".
1982 c. 39	Finance Act 1982	Section 137(2), (3), (6) and (7).
1984 c. 32	London Regional Transport Act 1984	In Schedule 5, paragraph 5(b) and the word "and" before it.
1988 c. 1	Income and Corporation Taxes Act 1988	In sections 65A(7) and 70A(6) the words "and section 29 of the 1990 Act (provisions relating to furnished holiday accommodation)".
1988 c. 1	Income and Corporation Taxes Act 1988	In section 83A, in subsection (2), paragraph (b) and the word "or" before it and in subsection (3), paragraph (b) and the word "and" before it.
1988 c. 1	Income and Corporation Taxes Act 1988	In section 84, in subsection (1), paragraph (b) and the word "or" before it and in subsection (3), paragraph (b) and the word "and" before it.
1988 c. 1	Income and Corporation Taxes Act 1988	In section 117, in subsection (1), the words "or allowed" (in each place), "or section 141 of the 1990 Act", paragraph (b) and the word "or" before it, and, in subsection (2), in the definition of "the aggregate amount", the words "or allowed", "or section 141 of the 1990 Act", paragraph (b) and the word "or" before it.
1988 c. 1	Income and Corporation Taxes Act 1988	In section 118, in subsection (1) the words "or allowed" (in each place), "or section 145 of the 1990 Act", paragraph (b) and the word "or" before it, and, in subsection (2), in the definition of "the aggregate amount", the words "or allowed", "or section 145 of the 1990 Act", and paragraph (b) and the word "or" before it.
1988 c. 1	Income and Corporation Taxes Act 1988	In section 198(2), the words "and Part II of the 1990 Act (capital allowances in respect of machinery and plant)".
1988 c. 1	Income and Corporation Taxes Act 1988	In section 384(10), the words following paragraph (b).
1988 c. 1	Income and Corporation Taxes Act 1988	Section 393A(5) and (6).
1988 c. 1	Income and Corporation Taxes Act 1988	In section 397, in subsection (5), the definition of "basis year" and, in the definition of "chargeable period", the words from "or any basis period" to the end of the definition; and subsection (6).
1988 c. 1	Income and Corporation Taxes Act 1988	In section 411(10) the words "Without prejudice to the provisions of section 161(5) of the 1990 Act".
1988 c. 1	Income and Corporation Taxes Act 1988	Sections 434D and 434E.
1988 c. 1	Income and Corporation Taxes Act 1988	Sections 520 to 523.
1988 c. 1	Income and Corporation Taxes Act 1988	Section 528(1) and (4).
1988 c. 1	Income and Corporation Taxes Act 1988	Section 530.
1988 c. 1	Income and Corporation Taxes Act 1988	In section 531, in subsection (3), the words following paragraph (b) and in subsection (7) the words "and section 530(1) and (6)".
1988 c. 1	Income and Corporation Taxes Act 1988	In section 533(1), in paragraph (b) of the definition of "income from patents", the words "520(6), 523(3)," and the definition of "the commencement of the patent".
1988 c. 1	Income and Corporation Taxes Act 1988	In section 577, in subsection (1), paragraph (c) and the word "and" before it, in subsection (7)(a) the words ", or to the use of an asset for," (in both places) and in subsection (10) the words ", or any claim for capital allowances in respect of the use of an asset for,".
1988 c. 1	Income and Corporation Taxes Act 1988	In section 834(2), the words "and also for sections 144 and 145 of the 1990 Act".
1988 c. 1	Income and Corporation Taxes Act 1988	In Schedule 19AC, paragraph 9C.
1989 c. 26	Finance Act 1989	Section 121.
1989 c. 26	Finance Act 1989	In Schedule 13, paragraph 27.
1990 c. 1	Capital Allowances Act 1990	The whole act.
1990 c. 29	Finance Act 1990	Sections 60, 87 and 103.
1990 c. 29	Finance Act 1990	In Schedule 7, paragraph 9.
1990 c. 29	Finance Act 1990	In Schedule 9, paragraph 5.
1990 c. 29	Finance Act 1990	In Schedule 13, paragraphs 1 to 6.
1990 c. 29	Finance Act 1990	Schedule 17.
1991 c. 31	Finance Act 1991	Sections 59 to 61.
1991 c. 31	Finance Act 1991	Schedule 14.
1991 c. 31	Finance Act 1991	In Schedule 15, paragraph 28.
1991 c. 21	Disability Living Allowance and Disability Working Allowance Act 1991	In Schedule 2, paragraphs 20 and 21.
1991 c. 60	Water (Consolidation) (Consequential Provisions) Act 1991	In Schedule 1, paragraph 53.
1992 c. 4	Social Security Contributions and Benefits Act 1992	In Schedule 2, paragraph 1(b) and, in paragraph 2, the words from "subject to deduction" to the end.
1992 c. 6	Social Security (Consequential Provisions) Act 1992	In Schedule 2, paragraph 109.
1992 c. 7	Social Security Contributions and Benefits (Northern Ireland) Act 1992	In Schedule 2, paragraph 1(b) and, in paragraph 2, the words from "subject to deduction" to the end.
1992 c. 9	Social Security (Consequential Provisions) (Northern Ireland) Act 1992	In Schedule 2, paragraph 38.
1992 c. 12	Taxation of Chargeable Gains Act 1992	In section 195, in subsection (3), the words from "and "basis year"" to the end, subsection (5) and in subsection (6), paragraph (b) and the word "and" before it.
1992 c. 12	Taxation of Chargeable Gains Act 1992	In section 288(1), the definition of "the 1990 Act".
1992 c. 12	Taxation of Chargeable Gains Act 1992	In Schedule 10, paragraph 21.
1992 c. 48	Finance (No. 2) Act 1992	In section 43(1), the definition of "the 1990 Act".
1992 c. 48	Finance (No. 2) Act 1992	Sections 67 to 71.
1992 c. 48	Finance (No. 2) Act 1992	Schedule 13.
1992 c. 48	Finance (No. 2) Act 1992	In Schedule 17, in paragraph 5(5), paragraph (c) and the word "and" before it.
1993 c. 34	Finance Act 1993	Sections 113 to 117.
1993 c. 34	Finance Act 1993	Schedules 12 and 13.
1994 c. 9	Finance Act 1994	Sections 117, 118(6)(a), 119(1), 120 and 121.
1994 c. 9	Finance Act 1994	Sections 211(1) and 212 to 213.
1994 c. 9	Finance Act 1994	Section 214(4) to (6).
1994 c. 9	Finance Act 1994	In Schedule 24, in paragraph 1(1), the definition of "the Allowances Act".
1994 c. 9	Finance Act 1994	In Schedule 25, in paragraph 5(3), the definition of "the 1990 Act".
1994 c. 23	Value Added Tax Act 1994	In Schedule 14, paragraph 11.
1995 c. 4	Finance Act 1995	Sections 94 to 101.
1995 c. 4	Finance Act 1995	In Schedule 8, paragraphs 23(1) and 24.
1995 c. 4	Finance Act 1995	In Schedule 9, paragraph 3.
1996 c. 8	Finance Act 1996	Sections 135(3) to (5), 179 and 180.
1996 c. 8	Finance Act 1996	In Schedule 20, paragraph 44.
1996 c. 8	Finance Act 1996	In Schedule 21, paragraphs 26 to 34.
1996 c. 8	Finance Act 1996	Schedule 35.
1996 c. 8	Finance Act 1996	In Schedule 39, paragraph 1(1), (3) and (4).
1996 c. 55	Broadcasting Act 1996	In Schedule 7, in paragraph 1(1), the definition of "the Allowances Act" and in paragraph 13(1), in the heading the words "and structures".
1997 c. 11	Planning (Consequential Provisions) (Scotland) Act 1997	In Schedule 2, paragraph 45.
1997 c. 16	Finance Act 1997	Sections 66(2) and (5), 84 and 86.
1997 c. 16	Finance Act 1997	In Schedule 12, in paragraph 11, in sub-paragraph (8) the words "or its basis period" and sub-paragraph (15).
1997 c. 16	Finance Act 1997	Schedule 14.
1997 c. 16	Finance Act 1997	In Schedule 15, paragraphs 3, 4, 5(3), 7, 8 and (9)(2).
1997 c. 16	Finance Act 1997	Schedule 16.
1997 c. 58	Finance (No. 2) Act 1997	Sections 42 to 47.
1998 c. 14	Social Security Act 1998	Section 59(2).
1998 c. 17	Petroleum Act 1998	In Schedule 4, paragraph 27.
1998 c. 36	Finance Act 1998	Sections 83 to 85.
1998 c. 36	Finance Act 1998	In Schedule 5, paragraphs 40 and 47 to 61.
1998 c. 36	Finance Act 1998	In Schedule 7, in paragraph 1 the word "528(1)(a)" and paragraph 4.
1999 c. 16	Finance Act 1999	Sections 50(2), 77 and 78.
1999 c. 16	Finance Act 1999	In Schedule 5, paragraph 2(3).
1999 c. 16	Finance Act 1999	In Schedule 11, paragraphs 4 to 8.
1999 c. 29	Greater London Authority Act 1999	In Schedule 33, paragraph 12(1)(a).
2000 c. 17	Finance Act 2000	Sections 70 to 72.
2000 c. 17	Finance Act 2000	Section 75(1) to (3), (5) and (6)(b) and (c).
2000 c. 17	Finance Act 2000	Section 76(1).
2000 c. 17	Finance Act 2000	Section 77.
2000 c. 17	Finance Act 2000	Section 79.
2000 c. 17	Finance Act 2000	Sections 80 and 81.
2000 c. 17	Finance Act 2000	Section 113.
2000 c. 17	Finance Act 2000	In Schedule 19, paragraphs 7 to 11.
2000 c. 17	Finance Act 2000	In Schedule 22, in paragraph 84(1) the words "or structure".
2000 c. 38	Transport Act 2000	In Schedule 26, in paragraph 1(1), the definition of "the 1990 Act".
