= Finance Act 2004 =

Act of the Parliament of the United Kingdom

Finance Act 2004 (Note: Section 328.)
- Act of Parliament
- Parliament of the United Kingdom
- Long title: An Act to grant certain duties, to alter other duties, and to amend the law relating to the National Debt and the Public Revenue, and to make further provision in connection with finance.
- Citation: 2004 c. 12
- Territorial extent: United Kingdom

Dates
- Royal assent: 22 July 2004
- Commencement: 22 July 2004 (Note: Section 4(b) of the Interpretation Act 1978.)
Other legislation
Amends	Stamp Act 1891; Betting and Gaming Duties Act 1981; Inheritance Tax Act 1984; Social Security Contributions and Benefits Act 1992; Social Security Contributions and Benefits (Northern Ireland) Act 1992; Pension Schemes (Northern Ireland) Act 1993; Value Added Tax Act 1994; Town and Country Planning (Scotland) Act 1997; Capital Allowances Act 2001
Amended by	National Health Service (Consequential Provisions) Act 2006; Finance Act 2015; Finance Act 2026

Status: Amended

Text of statute as originally enacted

Revised text of statute as amended

The Finance Act 2004 (c. 12) is an act of the Parliament of the United Kingdom. It prescribes changes to Excise Duties, Value Added Tax, Income Tax, Corporation Tax, and Capital Gains Tax. It enacts the 2004 Budget speech made by Chancellor of the Exchequer Gordon Brown to the Parliament of the United Kingdom.

In the UK, the Chancellor delivers an annual budget speech outlining changes in spending, tax and duty. The respective year's Finance Act is the mechanism to enact the changes.

The rules governing the various taxation methods are contained within the various taxation acts. (For instance Capital Gains Tax legislation is contained within Taxation of Chargeable Gains Act 1992. The Finance Act details amendments to be made to each one of these acts.

Notable changes in the 2004 act included changes to the taxation of UK pensions and provisions to reduce avoidance of inheritance tax.

== Pensions taxation ==
One of the main changes introduced by the act was a change in the taxation of UK pensions from 6 April 2006. Prior to the change many different taxation regimes applied to pension schemes depending on the type of scheme. The changes introduced a single taxation regime.

The principle of the new regime is that a pension fund will be tax-free provided it is below the life time allowance (which was set at £1.5 million for the year from 6 April 2006). A second restriction was imposed limiting the maximum annual contribution into a pension scheme.

Although the new regime is simpler, the need to provide transitional arrangements for pension scheme members whose existing entitlements exceed the new limits resulted in the actual implementation being extremely complex.

== Inheritance tax ==
The act also introduced an income tax regime known as pre-owned asset tax which aims to reduce the use of common methods of inheritance tax avoidance.

== Section 4 ==
The Finance Act 2004 (Duty Stamps) (Appointed Day) Order 2006 (SI 2006/201 (C. 3) was made under sections 4(5) and (6).

== Section 18 ==
The Finance Act 2004, Section 18 (Appointed Day) Order 2005 (SI 2005/2356 (C. 98)) was made under section 18(4).

== Section 19 ==
The Finance Act 2004, section 19(1) and Schedule 2, (Appointed Day) Order 2004 (SI 2004/1934 (C. 82)) was made under section 19(2)(b).

== Section 22 ==
The Finance Act 2004, section 22(2), (Appointed Day) Order 2004 (SI 2004/3104 (C. 129)) was made under section 22(6).

== Section 53 ==
The Finance Act 2004, Section 53 (Commencement) Order 2004 (SI 2004/3268 (C. 147)) was made under section 53(6).

== Section 85 ==
The Finance Act 2004, Section 85, (Commencement) Order 2004 (SI 2004/1945 (C. 86)) was made under section 85(2).

== Section 141 ==
The Finance Act 2004, Section 141 (Appointed Day) Order 2005 (SI 2005/123 (C. 6)) was made under sections 141(6) and (7).

== Section 291 ==
The Finance Act 2004, section 291, (Appointed Day) Order 2004 (SI 2004/1942 (C. 84)) was made under section 291(4).

== Section 294 ==
The Finance Act 2004, Section 294 (Appointed Day) Order 2004 (SI 2004/2571 (C. 109)) was made under sections 294(4) to (6).
