= Finance Act 1997 =

Act of the Parliament of the United Kingdom

Finance Act 1997 (Note: Section 114.)
- Act of Parliament
- Parliament of the United Kingdom
- Long title: An Act to grant certain duties, to alter other duties, and to amend the law relating to the National Debt and the Public Revenue, and to make further provision in connection with Finance.
- Citation: 1997 c. 16
- Territorial extent: United Kingdom

Dates
- Royal assent: 19 March 1997
- Commencement: 19 March 1997 (Note: Section 4(b) of the Interpretation Act 1978.)
Other legislation
Amends	Betting and Gaming Duties Act 1981; Inheritance Tax Act 1984; Debtors (Scotland) Act 1987; Value Added Tax Act 1994
Amended by	Statute Law (Repeals) Act 1998; Capital Allowances Act 2001; Work and Families Act 2006; Statute Law (Repeals) Act 2013; Finance Act 2015

Status: Amended

Text of statute as originally enacted

Revised text of statute as amended

Text of the Finance Act 1997 as in force today (including any amendments) within the United Kingdom, from legislation.gov.uk.

The Finance Act 1997 (c. 16) is an act of the Parliament of the United Kingdom enacting the 1996 United Kingdom Budget. The Chancellor of the Exchequer delivers the annual budget speech outlining changes in spending, tax, duty and other financial matters. The respective year's Finance Act is the mechanism to enact the changes. Levels of Excise Duties, Value Added Tax, Income Tax, Corporation Tax and Capital Gains Tax) are often modified. The budget was outlined by Kenneth Clarke, in November 1996.

The rules governing the various taxation methods are contained within the relevant taxation acts. (For instance Capital Gains Tax Legislation is contained within Taxation of Chargeable Gains Act 1992). The Finance Act details amendments to be made to each one of these acts.
