= For-profit corporation =

Corporation that aims to earn profit

A for-profit corporation is an organization which aims to earn profit through its operations and is concerned with its own interests, rather than the interests of the public (nonprofit corporation).

== Structure ==
A for-profit corporation is usually an organization operating in the private sector which sets aims that eventually help the organization itself. This kind of a company makes shares of ownership available to the general public. The purchasers of those shares then become the company's shareholders; shareholders have bought a portion of ownership of the corporation by giving away certain amount of money (differentiating from company to company) or assets of a particular value. Such organizations are usually not aided by the government as they are working for private financial gains, unlike a non-profit organization, which exists to serve a mission. The nature of a for-profit corporation is such that it is required to pay applicable taxes and register with the state. Any donation which they receive will also be subject to the tax policies of the concerned country. As these organizations are all corporations and have a separate identity from their owners the owners are not in their personal capacity required to satisfy any debts which the company might owe to anyone.

== Aims ==
Unlike non-profit organizations the policies of these organizations are usually profit oriented. Managers (corporate employees) here have a profit oriented mindset and aim at maximising the revenue of the firm which in turn contributes to the dividends (in case of public limited) or profits of the shareholders/owners. Their aim can be accompanied by a goal of serving the society however that usually happens in cases of B-corporations.

== Popular models ==
A for-profit corporation generally does mean an organization seeking profit however it has both modern forms and is also close to some other types of organizations as seen below.

=== Benefit corporations ===
A modern form of profit corporations exists in the form of a "benefit corporations." A number of for-profit corporations have opted to change their corporate form to this one. Many new corporations have been incorporating as benefit corporations. A benefit corporation aims to gain profit but also has a social mission that may have to do with protecting the environment or pursuing social justice initiatives. They are accepted as legal entities in several states of the United States and legislations have been passed to ensure their legal status.

=== Proximity to LLCs ===
A for-profit corporation can also be seen in context of a limited liability company as both of them have a very similar function. Both of them are common in a way as stakeholders in a for-profit corporation are called shareholders whereas a person who has stakes in a Limited Liability Company is referred to as a member. Subsequently, while corporations have a very defined hierarchy from corporate employees to board members.

== Advantages ==
=== To the economy ===
As these organizations aim to maximise profit they can be very healthy in an economy as the more they earn the greater is the amount they pay in taxes. That tax is eventually spent back on the people. Such corporations have the capacity to grow at a very fast rate and this eventually leads them to employing more people (lowering the employment burden on the government). Their profit maximisation motive also means that they will work on their productivity and will contribute to the GDP of any country they are living in. A higher GDP often leads to a higher living standard.

=== To the business ===
As the corporation only works for its own interest, it can to isolate itself from all worldly matters and do what is best for itself. Owners can also have greater on the business as they have the free choice of making investments and decisions which will generate the greatest revenue for their business. They would not be obliged to consider any outer factor (welfare) while designing policies. More profit also means that they can invest the profit back to the business and increase its speed of growth.

== Difference between profit and not-for-profit ==
The major distinction between these two organizations can be derived from their names as a non-profit organization does not seek any profit, does not pay any taxes as it works for the welfare of the society and reinvests any surpluses earned back to the business. In contrast a for-profit corporation has no legal duty/obligation of working for the welfare of anyone but itself. This is the reason why a for-profit organization is not exempted any tax. Subsequently, at times running a not-for-profit corporation can be more difficult. Although both for and not-for-profit need a good decision making body however the aspect of serving the public puts an extra responsibility on the members of the board.

== Legal parameters ==
All for profit corporations in the United Kingdom fall under the jurisdiction of the Corporation Tax Act 2009. These companies are considered to be active for corporation tax purposes. This includes these corporations as they are trading or offering services(charged) to others, investing and are also dealing with the inflow and outflow of income. Similarly the owners can also not be taken to the courts for some wrong committed by the company. The company can be represented by a lawyer in a court of law. However, like any other corporation, it can not represent itself in a court.
