= Co-operative and Community Benefit Societies Act 2014 =

Act of the Parliament of the United Kingdom

Co-operative and Community Benefit Societies Act 2014 (Note: Section 155.)
- Act of Parliament
- Parliament of the United Kingdom
- Long title: An Act to consolidate certain enactments relating to co-operative societies, community benefit societies and other societies registered or treated as registered under the Industrial and Provident Societies Act 1965, with amendments to give effect to recommendations of the Law Commission and the Scottish Law Commission.
- Citation: 2014 c. 14
- Introduced by: Sajid Javid MP (Commons); Lord Newby (Lords)
- Territorial extent: England and Wales; Scotland; Northern Ireland (in part); (Note: Section 153.)

Dates
- Royal assent: 14 May 2014
- Commencement: 1 August 2014 (Note: Section 154.)
Other legislation
Amends	Forged Transfers Act 1891; Libraries Offences Act 1898; Stock Transfer Act 1963; Transport Act 1968; National Savings Bank Act 1971; Local Government Act 1972; Friendly Societies Act 1974; Industrial Common Ownership Act 1976; Housing Associations Act 1985; Finance Act 1986; Company Directors Disqualification Act 1986; Housing (Scotland) Act 1987; Income and Corporation Taxes Act 1988; Local Government and Housing Act 1989; Opticians Act 1989; Enterprise and New Towns (Scotland) Act 1990; Taxation of Chargeable Gains Act 1992; Trade Union and Labour Relations (Consolidation) Act 1992; Housing Act 1996; Scotland Act 1998; Greater London Authority Act 1999; Financial Services and Markets Act 2000; Terrorism Act 2000; Political Parties, Elections and Referendums Act 2000; Housing (Scotland) Act 2001; Land Registration Act 2002; Proceeds of Crime Act 2002; Income Tax (Earnings and Pensions) Act 2003; Licensing Act 2003; Fire and Rescue Services Act 2004; Companies (Audit, Investigations and Community Enterprise) Act 2004; Housing Act 2004; Income Tax (Trading and Other Income) Act 2005; Charities and Trustee Investment (Scotland) Act 2005; Companies Act 2006; Income Tax Act 2007; Building Societies (Funding) and Mutual Societies (Transfers) Act 2007; Serious Crime Act 2007; Bankruptcy and Diligence etc. (Scotland) Act 2007; Housing and Regeneration Act 2008; Local Transport Act 2008; Counter-Terrorism Act 2008; Corporation Tax Act 2009; Finance Act 2009; Local Democracy, Economic Development and Construction Act 2009; Corporation Tax Act 2010; Taxation (International and Other Provisions) Act 2010; Finance Act 2010; Finance Act 2011; Localism Act 2011; Public Bodies Act 2011; Charities Act 2011; See § Repealed enactments
Repeals/revokes	See § Repealed enactments
Amended by	Finance Act 2014; Finance Act 2015; Housing (Amendment) (Scotland) Act 2018; Corporate Insolvency and Governance Act 2020; Financial Services and Markets Act 2023

Status: Amended

History of passage through Parliament

Text of statute as originally enacted

Revised text of statute as amended

The Co-operative and Community Benefit Societies Act 2014 (c. 14) is an act of the Parliament of the United Kingdom that consolidates enactments relating to (what were then called) industrial and provident societies, as well as introducing some reforms.

The act received royal assent on 14 May 2014.

== Background ==
The existing legal framework for co-operative organisations had arisen through a series of private members' bills. The legislation was the result of recommendations by the Law Commission.

== Provisions ==
According to its long title, the act consolidates certain enactments relating to co-operative societies, community benefit societies and other societies registered or treated as registered under the Industrial and Provident Societies Act 1965, with amendments to give effect to recommendations of the Law Commission and the Scottish Law Commission.

=== Repealed enactments ===
Section 151(4) of the act repealed 36 enactments and revoked 16 instruments, listed in schedule 7 to the act.

==== Acts ====
Citation	Short title	Extent of repeal
1965 c. 12	Industrial and Provident Societies Act 1965	The whole act.
1965 c. 32	Administration of Estates (Small Payments) Act 1965	In Schedule 3, the entry for section 25(1) of the Industrial and Provident Societies Act 1965.
1967 c. 48	Industrial and Provident Societies Act 1967	The whole act.
1968 c. 55	Friendly and Industrial and Provident Societies Act 1968	The whole act.
1969 c. 39	Age of Majority (Scotland) Act 1969	In Schedule 1, the entry for section 20 of the Industrial and Provident Societies Act 1965.
1969 c. 46	Family Law Reform Act 1969	In section 19, subsection (2) and, in subsection (3), the words from "and subsection (2)" to the end.
1969 c. 46	Family Law Reform Act 1969	In Schedule 1, the entry for section 20 of the Industrial and Provident Societies Act 1965.
1974 c. 46	Friendly Societies Act 1974	In Schedule 9, paragraphs 18 and 22.
1975 c. 41	Industrial and Provident Societies Act 1975	The whole act.
1978 c. 34	Industrial and Provident Societies Act 1978	The whole act.
1984 c. 28	County Courts Act 1984	In Schedule 2, paragraph 29.
1985 c. 71	Housing (Consequential Provisions) Act 1985	In Schedule 2, paragraph 8.
1986 c. 41	Finance Act 1986	Section 24(4) and (5).
1986 c. 53	Building Societies Act 1986	In Schedule 18, paragraph 6.
1992 c. 14	Local Government Finance Act 1992	In Schedule 13, paragraph 13.
1992 c. 40	Friendly Societies Act 1992	Section 83.
1993 c. 38	Welsh Language Act 1993	Section 28.
1995 c. 7	Requirements of Writing (Scotland) Act 1995	In Schedule 4, paragraphs 42 and 43.
1996 c. 23	Arbitration Act 1996	In Schedule 3, paragraph 20.
2000 c. 8	Financial Services and Markets Act 2000	Part 4 of Schedule 18.
2001 asp 10	Housing (Scotland) Act 2001	In Schedule 10, paragraph 2.
2002 c. 20	Industrial and Provident Societies Act 2002	The whole act.
2002 c. 40	Enterprise Act 2002	Section 255(1)(a).
2003 c. 15	Co-operatives and Community Benefit Societies Act 2003	The whole act.
2003 c. 44	Criminal Justice Act 2003	In Schedule 25, paragraphs 60 and 61.
2004 c. 21	Fire and Rescue Services Act 2004	In Schedule 1, paragraph 19.
2004 c. 33	Civil Partnership Act 2004	In Schedule 27, paragraph 24.
2005 c. 4	Constitutional Reform Act 2005	In Schedule 7, in list A in paragraph 4, the entry for section 69 of the Industrial and Provident Societies Act 1965.
2005 c. 9	Mental Capacity Act 2005	In Schedule 6, paragraph 11.
2006 c. 50	Charities Act 2006	In Schedule 8, paragraph 47.
2010 c. 7	Co-operative and Community Benefit Societies and Credit Unions Act 2010	Sections 1 and 2.
2010 c. 7	Co-operative and Community Benefit Societies and Credit Unions Act 2010	Section 4.
2011 c. 20	Localism Act 2011	Section 185(2) to (4).
2011 c. 24	Public Bodies Act 2011	Section 36(2) and (3).
2011 c. 25	Charities Act 2011	In Schedule 7, paragraphs 14 and 16.
2011 c. 25	Charities Act 2011	In Schedule 9, paragraphs 5, 27 and 28.
2012 c. 14	Finance Act 2012	In Schedule 7, paragraph 24(3).
2012 c. 14	Finance Act 2012	In Schedule 8, paragraph 22(3).
2012 asp 5	Land Registration etc. (Scotland) Act 2012	In Schedule 5, paragraph 15.
2013 c. 22	Crime and Courts Act 2013	In section 61—(a) subsection (14); (b) in subsection (15), the words "and (14)".
2013 c. 22	Crime and Courts Act 2013	In Schedule 9—(a) in paragraph 52, the entry for section 60(8)(a) of the 1965 Act; (b) paragraph 91.

==== Subordinate legislation ====
Citation	Short title	Extent of revocation
SI 1981/394	Industrial and Provident Societies (Increase in Deposit-taking Limits) Order 1981	The whole order.
SI 1990/776	Local Government Finance (Repeals, Savings and Consequential Amendments) Order 1990	In Schedule 3, paragraph 9.
SI 1996/1738	Deregulation (Industrial and Provident Societies) Order 1996	Articles 3 to 5.
SI 1996/1738	Deregulation (Industrial and Provident Societies) Order 1996	Articles 7 to 9.
SI 1996/1738	Deregulation (Industrial and Provident Societies) Order 1996	Article 12.
SI 1997/627	Housing Act 1996 (Consequential Amendments) (No. 2) Order 1997	In the Schedule, paragraph 1.
SI 2001/2617	Financial Services and Markets Act 2000 (Mutual Societies) Order 2001	In Schedule 3, paragraphs 214 to 263.
SI 2001/3649	Financial Services and Markets Act 2000 (Consequential Amendments and Repeals) Order 2001	Article 183.
SI 2006/265	Friendly and Industrial and Provident Societies Act 1968 (Audit Exemption) (Amendment) Order 2006	The whole order.
SI 2007/2194	Companies Act 2006 (Commencement No. 3, Consequential Amendments, Transitional Provisions and Savings) Order 2007	In Schedule 4, paragraph 29.
SI 2008/948	Companies Act 2006 (Consequential Amendments etc) Order 2008	In Schedule 1, paragraphs 1(j), 4 and 5.
SI 2009/1941	Companies Act 2006 (Consequential Amendments, Transitional Provisions and Savings) Order 2009	In Schedule 1, paragraphs 14 and 16.
SI 2010/866	Housing and Regeneration Act 2008 (Consequential Provisions) Order 2010	In Schedule 2, paragraphs 1 and 119.
SI 2011/593	Mutual Societies (Electronic Communications) Order 2011	Articles 22 and 24.
SI 2011/2687	Legislative Reform (Industrial and Provident Societies and Credit Unions) Order 2011	Articles 3 to 7.
SI 2011/2687	Legislative Reform (Industrial and Provident Societies and Credit Unions) Order 2011	Article 8(1).
SI 2011/2687	Legislative Reform (Industrial and Provident Societies and Credit Unions) Order 2011	Article 9.
SI 2011/2687	Legislative Reform (Industrial and Provident Societies and Credit Unions) Order 2011	Article 10.
SI 2012/700	Housing (Scotland) Act 2010 (Consequential Provisions and Modifications) Order 2012	In the Schedule, paragraph 6.
SI 2012/961	Localism Act 2011 (Consequential Amendments) Order 2012	In Schedule 1, paragraph 1.
SI 2013/496	Financial Services Act 2012 (Mutual Societies) Order 2013	Schedules 2 to 4.

== Effects ==
The act renamed industrial and provident societies as co-operative or community benefit societies. The act effectively implemented the renaming provisions first enacted in the Co-operative and Community Benefit Societies and Credit Unions Act 2010 and coincided with a number of other changes foreshadowed by the 2010 act, such as the application of the Company Directors Disqualification Act 1986 to society directors (known as committee members in the legislation) by the commencement of section 3 of the 2010 act from 1 April 2014.

Since 1 August 2014, a new society must register as either a co-operative or a community benefit society rather than, as had been the case, an industrial and provident society that met either requirement. Societies already registered before that date remain registered under the 2014 act. Sections 1 and 2 provide that all three types of society (co-operative societies, community benefit societies and societies already registered before 1 August 2014) are referred to together as "registered societies". However, for administrative purposes, the three types of society are categorised separately. The Act applies to Great Britain but not Northern Ireland.

The 2014 act consolidated previous legislation and modernised its language. Its enactment coincided with a number of reforms to the law applying to societies which were implemented by secondary legislation. They included the application of insolvency rescue procedures such as administration and creditors' voluntary arrangements, to societies by The Industrial and Provident Societies and Credit Unions (Arrangements, Reconstructions and Administration) Order 2014 SI 2014/229; increased Financial Conduct Authority (FCA) powers of investigation and inspection of societies under the Co-operative and Community Benefit Societies and Credit Unions (Investigations) Regulations 2014 SI 2014/574 and an increase in the holding limit for withdrawable shares in societies from £20,000 to £100,000 in s. 24 of the act.

Societies are registered with the Financial Conduct Authority, which registers them and applies the statutory tests about whether a society meets on registration and continues to meet the requirements of s. 1 and 2 of the act.

== Co-operative and community benefit societies ==
=== Characteristics ===
Co-operative and community benefit societies ("registered societies") are societies "for carrying on any industry, business or trade". They are bodies corporate separate from their members, and members have limited liability. They come into being as such upon registration by the Financial Conduct Authority (FCA).

A registered society may be conceptually distinguished from a company as being "an association of persons", as opposed to (in the case of a company) "an aggregation of capital". Unlike in the case of companies, which have no legal existence at all until registration, a registered society pre-exists its registration in the form of an unincorporated association. (An exception is that a company may by re-registration convert itself to a registered society.)

Organisations usually incorporated as registered societies include consumer, worker, agricultural and housing co-operatives, working men's clubs, Women's Institute markets, allotment societies, mutual investment companies, friendly societies and housing associations. Some social enterprises do so also. This process is facilitated by the existence of "model rules" developed by various federal bodies, which reduce the legal costs.

Registered societies may in general conduct any lawful business. However, a co-operative society may not carry on business "with the object of making profits mainly for the payment of interest, dividends or bonuses on money".

=== Principal types ===
The act makes a fundamental distinction between two types of registered society, formalising the two broad categories of industrial and provident societies that obtained from 1939 to 2014.

- Co-operatives trade for the mutual benefit of their members, and the FCA as registrar will judge the legality of their initial or continued registration by reference to co-operative principles.
- Community benefit societies trade to benefit the community in general (or a particular community), and the FCA will consider whether they satisfy that requirement by prohibiting any distribution of assets or profits to members, and generally whether their aims are charitable or more widely philanthropic so as to offer "community benefit".

A society must be registered in one or other of these categories: a society may be hybrid in practice, but cannot be so legally.

=== Shares ===
A share in a registered society gives a right to the nominal value of the share. The capital of the association in excess of the nominal issued capital is owned by the members jointly, and not in shares. Thus profits, where they are distributable at all, are paid as interest on shares and not as a dividend. In this respect a share in a society is quite different from a share in a company - although, as in the case of a company, interest is not payable if there are no profits.

In principle shares can have any other characteristics the rules provide for, but in practice the FCA will not register any rule that allows for more than one voting share per member, or for interest on shares to exceed the minimum required to obtain the capital the society needs.

Society shares that are not transferable fall outside the regulatory perimeter of the Financial Services and Markets Act. This is a significant motive for some organisations to become or convert to a registered society.

Shares are often withdrawable. Most societies provide for a notice period and for the suspension of withdrawals to mitigate against the risk of capital flight. Normally the value of shares may be written down if the value of the society's assets falls below the total nominal value issued.

=== Special cases ===
==== Financial societies ====
Credit unions and building societies, which sprang from the same roots as registered societies, are governed by specific legislation: see the Credit Unions Act 1979 and the Building Societies Act 1986 and later legislation. This said, the registration of a credit union is under the 2014 act, and thus credit unions are strictly a subspecies of registered society. As deposit takers, credit unions and building societies are 'dual regulated', requiring authorisation from the Prudential Regulation Authority in addition to registration by the FCA. Friendly Societies are a different legal form, despite their similar history: prior to 1992 these could not be bodies corporate, whereas registered societies always have been.

==== Charitable community benefit societies ====
A community benefit society may have charitable objects. If (in England and Wales) it otherwise meets the requirements for charitable status, it is categorised as an exempt charity. This means it cannot register with the Charity Commission, with oversight instead provided by the FCA as 'principal regulator'. The commission has jurisdiction to investigate and make schemes as for any other charity, but only at the request of the FCA.

Exempt charities may apply to be recognised as such by the taxation authority, HM Revenue and Customs. If accepted they come under the same advantageous fiscal regime as any other charity.

In Scotland, charitable community benefit societies register with the Office of the Scottish Charity Regulator.

As a charity by definition exists for public and not private benefit, co-operative societies cannot achieve charitable status. Where a charitable community benefit society pays interest on shares, this comes under special scrutiny: the Charity Commission has published guidelines.

== See also ==
- Co-operative and Community Benefit Societies and Credit Unions Act 2010
- Industrial and provident society
