= Finance Act 2005 =

Act of the Parliament of the United Kingdom

Finance Act 2005 (Note: Section 106.)
- Act of Parliament
- Parliament of the United Kingdom
- Long title: An Act to grant certain duties, to alter other duties, and to amend the law relating to the National Debt and the Public Revenue, and to make further provision in connection with finance.
- Citation: 2005 c. 7
- Territorial extent: United Kingdom

Dates
- Royal assent: 7 April 2005
- Commencement: 7 April 2005 (Note: Section 4(b) of the Interpretation Act 1978.)

Other legislation
- Amends: Inheritance Tax Act 1984; Capital Allowances Act 2001
- Amended by: Finance Act 2015

Status: Amended

Text of statute as originally enacted

Revised text of statute as amended

The Finance Act 2005 (c. 7) is an act of the Parliament of the United Kingdom.

== Provisions ==
=== Section 1 - Rates of tobacco products duty ===
Section 1(1) substitutes the Table of rates of duty in Schedule 1 to the Tobacco Products Duty Act 1979.

=== Section 8 - Charge and rates for 2005-06 ===
This section was repealed by section 1031 of, and Part 1 of Schedule 3 to, the Income Tax Act 2007.

=== Section 9 - Personal allowances for those aged 65 or more ===
This section was repealed by section 1031 of, and Part 1 of Schedule 3 to, the Income Tax Act 2007.

=== Section 14 - Special trust rates not to apply to first slice of trust income ===
This section was repealed by section 1031 of, and Part 1 of Schedule 3 to, the Income Tax Act 2007.

=== Section 41 - Interpretation etc ===
Paragraph (a) of the definition of "tax year" in section 41(1), with the following "and", was repealed by section 1031 of, and Part 1 of Schedule 3 to, the Income Tax Act 2007.

=== Section 44 - Consequential amendments ===
Section 44(1) was repealed by section 1031 of, and Part 1 of Schedule 3 to, the Income Tax Act 2007.
