= Finance Act 2001 =

Act of the Parliament of the United Kingdom

Finance Act 2001 (Note: Section 111.)
- Act of Parliament
- Parliament of the United Kingdom
- Long title: An Act to grant certain duties, to alter other duties, and to amend the law relating to the National Debt and the Public Revenue, and to make further provision in connection with Finance.
- Citation: 2001 c. 9
- Territorial extent: United Kingdom

Dates
- Royal assent: 11 May 2001
- Commencement: 11 May 2001 (Note: Section 4(b) of the Interpretation Act 1978.)
Other legislation
Amends	Government Trading Funds Act 1973; Betting and Gaming Duties Act 1981
Amended by	Statute Law (Repeals) Act 2013; Finance Act 2015

Status: Amended

Text of statute as originally enacted

Revised text of statute as amended

The Finance Act 2001 (c. 9) is an act of the Parliament of the United Kingdom prescribing changes to Excise Duties, Value Added Tax, Income Tax, Corporation Tax, and Capital Gains Tax. It enacts the 2001 Budget speech made by Chancellor of the Exchequer Gordon Brown to the Parliament of the United Kingdom.

In the UK, the Chancellor delivers an annual Budget speech outlining changes in spending, tax and duty. The respective year's Finance Act is the mechanism to enact the changes.

The rules governing the various taxation methods are contained within the various taxation acts. (For instance Capital Gains Tax Legislation is contained within Taxation of Chargeable Gains Act 1992. The Finance Act details amendments to be made to each one of these acts.
