= Betting and Gaming Duties Act 1981 =

Act of the Parliament of the United Kingdom

Betting and Gaming Duties Act 1981 (Note: Section 35(1).)
- Act of Parliament
- Parliament of the United Kingdom
- Long title: An Act to consolidate certain enactments concerning the duties of excise relating to betting and gaming.
- Citation: 1981 c. 63
- Territorial extent: England and Wales; Scotland; (Note: Section 35(3).)

Dates
- Royal assent: 30 October 1981
- Commencement: 30 October 1981 (Note: Section 4(b) of the Interpretation Act 1978.)
Other legislation
Amends	See § Repealed enactments
Repeals/revokes	See § Repealed enactments
Amended by	Companies Consolidation (Consequential Provisions) Act 1985; Finance Act 1985; Insolvency Act 1985; Bankruptcy (Scotland) Act 1985; Finance Act 1986; Debtors (Scotland) Act 1987; Finance Act 1994; Finance Act 1995; Criminal Procedure (Consequential Provisions) (Scotland) Act 1995; Finance Act 1996; Finance Act 1997; Finance Act 1999; Finance Act 2001; Finance Act 2002; Finance Act 2003; Finance Act 2004; Limited Liability Partnerships Regulations (Northern Ireland) 2004; Gambling Act 2005; Finance Act 2006; Finance Act 2007; Finance Act 2012; Finance Act 2014; Finance Act 2026

Status: Partially repealed

Text of statute as originally enacted

Revised text of statute as amended

Text of the Betting and Gaming Duties Act 1981 as in force today (including any amendments) within the United Kingdom, from legislation.gov.uk.

The Betting and Gaming Duties Act 1981 (c. 63) is an act of the Parliament of the United Kingdom that consolidated enactments concerning the duties of excise relating to betting and gaming in Great Britain.

== Provisions ==
=== Repealed enactments ===
Section 34(2) of the act repealed 9 enactments, listed in schedule 7 to the act.

Enactments repealed by section 34(2)
Citation	Short title	Extent of repeal
1972 c. 25	Betting and Gaming Duties Act 1972	The whole act.
1972 c. 41	Finance Act 1972	Section 58.
1972 c. 69	Horserace Totalisator and Betting Levy Boards Act 1972	Section 1(6).
1974 c. 30	Finance Act 1974	Section 2(2), as respects England, Wales and Scotland.
1975 c. 45	Finance (No. 2) Act 1975	Sections 3 and 4.
1976 c. 32	Lotteries and Amusements Act 1976	In Schedule 4, paragraph 8.
1979 c. 2	Customs and Excise Management Act 1979	In Schedule 4, in paragraph 12, in Part I of the Table, the entries relating to the Betting and Gaming Duties Act 1972.
1980 c. 48	Finance Act 1980	Sections 6, 7(1).
1980 c. 48	Finance Act 1980	Schedule 5 and Part I of Schedule 6.
1981 c. 35	Finance Act 1981	In section 9, in subsection (1) the words from "section 1(2)(b)" to "and", subsections (2), (3), (4), (5), (7) and in subsection (8) the words from "subsections (2)" to "subsections (5)".
1981 c. 35	Finance Act 1981	Schedule 5.
