= Finance Act 2009 =

Act of the Parliament of the United Kingdom

Finance Act 2009 (Note: Section 127.)
- Act of Parliament
- Parliament of the United Kingdom
- Long title: An Act to grant certain duties, to alter other duties, and to amend the law relating to the National Debt and the Public Revenue, and to make further provision in connection with finance.
- Citation: 2009 c. 10
- Territorial extent: United Kingdom

Dates
- Royal assent: 21 July 2009
- Commencement: 21 July 2009 (Note: Section 4(b) of the Interpretation Act 1978.)
Other legislation
Amends	Inheritance Tax Act 1984; Value Added Tax Act 1994; Criminal Procedure (Consequential Provisions) (Scotland) Act 1995; Capital Allowances Act 2001
Amended by	Co-operative and Community Benefit Societies Act 2014; Finance Act 2015

Status: Amended

History of passage through Parliament

Text of statute as originally enacted

Revised text of statute as amended

The Finance Act 2009 (c. 10) is an act of the Parliament of the United Kingdom. It amends the law in relation to pensions, Income Tax, Capital Gains Tax, Corporation Tax, Value Added Tax, stamp taxes, alcohol and tobacco duties, gambling duties, Vehicle Excise Duty, fuel duty, Climate Change Levy, Landfill Tax and other environmental taxes and duties.

== Commencement ==
The following orders have been made under this act to bring parts of it into force:

- The Finance Act 2009, Section 96 and Schedule 48 (Appointed Day, Savings and Consequential Amendments) Order 2009 (SI 2009/3054 (C. 133))
- The Finance Act 2009, Schedule 56 (Appointed Day and Consequential Provisions) Order 2010 (SI 2010/466 (C. 31))
- The Finance Act 2009, Section 94 (Appointed Day) Order 2010 (SI 2010/574 (C. 40))
- The Finance Act 2009, Paragraph 12(2)(b) of Schedule 22 (Appointed Day) Order 2010 (SI 2010/670 (C. 43))
- The Finance Act 2009, Schedule 50 (Record-keeping) (Appointed Day) Order 2010 (SI 2010/815 (C. 55))
- The Finance Act 2009, Schedule 51 (Time Limits for Assessments, Claims, etc.) (Appointed Days and Transitional Provisions) Order 2010 (SI 2010/867 (C. 58))
- The Finance Act 2009, Sections 101 to 103 (Appointed Day and Supplemental Provision) Order 2010 (SI 2010/1878 (C. 96))
- The Finance Act 2009, Sections 101 to 103 (Income Tax Self Assessment) (Appointed Days and Transitional and Consequential Provisions) Order 2011 (SI 2011/701 (C. 26))
- The Finance Act 2009, Schedules 55 and 56 (Income Tax Self Assessment and Pension Schemes) (Appointed Days and Consequential and Savings Provisions) Order 2011 (SI 2011/702 (C. 27))

== See also ==
- Finance Act
