= Finance Act 2007 =

Act of the Parliament of the United Kingdom

Finance Act 2007 (Note: Section 115.)
- Act of Parliament
- Parliament of the United Kingdom
- Long title: An Act to grant certain duties, to alter other duties, and to amend the law relating to the National Debt and the Public Revenue, and to make further provision in connection with finance.
- Citation: 2007 c. 11
- Territorial extent: United Kingdom

Dates
- Royal assent: 19 July 2007
- Commencement: 19 July 2007 (Note: Section 4(b) of the Interpretation Act 1978.)
Other legislation
Amends	Customs and Excise Management Act 1979; Betting and Gaming Duties Act 1981; Inheritance Tax Act 1984; Pension Schemes (Northern Ireland) Act 1993; Value Added Tax Act 1994; Criminal Procedure (Scotland) Act 1995; Criminal Procedure (Consequential Provisions) (Scotland) Act 1995; Capital Allowances Act 2001
Amended by	Finance Act 2015

Status: Amended

History of passage through Parliament

Text of statute as originally enacted

Revised text of statute as amended

The Finance Act 2007 (c. 11) is an act of the Parliament of the United Kingdom prescribing changes to Excise Duties, Value Added Tax, Income Tax, Corporation Tax and Capital Gains Tax. It enacts the Budget of 21 March 2007.

In the UK, the Chancellor delivers an annual Budget speech outlining changes in spending, tax and duty. The respective year's Finance Act is the mechanism to enact the changes.

The rules governing the various taxation methods are contained within the relevant taxation acts. (For instance Capital Gains Tax Legislation is contained within Taxation of Chargeable Gains Act 1992). The Finance Act details amendments to be made to each one of these Acts.

== Bibliography ==
- Halsbury's Statutes
