= Inheritance Tax Act 1984 =

Act of the Parliament of the United Kingdom

Inheritance Tax Act 1984 (Note: The citation of this act by this short title was authorised by section 100(1)(a) of the Finance Act 1986. The act was originally cited as the Capital Transfer Tax Act 1984 by section 278.)
- Act of Parliament
- Parliament of the United Kingdom
- Long title: An Act to consolidate provisions of Part III of the Finance Act 1975 and other enactments relating to capital transfer tax.
- Citation: 1984 c. 51
- Territorial extent: United Kingdom

Dates
- Royal assent: 31 July 1984
- Commencement: 31 July 1984 (Note: Section 4(b) of the Interpretation Act 1978.)
Other legislation
Amends	See § Repealed enactments
Repeals/revokes	See § Repealed enactments
Amended by	List: National Heritage (Scotland) Act 1985; Statute Law (Repeals) Act 1986; Finance Act 1986; Income and Corporation Taxes Act 1988; Taxation of Chargeable Gains Act 1992; Statute Law (Repeals) Act 1993; Finance Act 1994; Value Added Tax Act 1994; General and Special Commissioners (Amendment of Enactments) Regulations 1994; Finance Act 1995; Historic Monuments and Archaeological Objects (Northern Ireland) Order 1995; Inheritance Tax (Indexation) Order 1995; Finance Act 1996; Trusts of Land and Appointment of Trustees Act 1996; Transfer of Functions (Registration and Statistics) Order 1996; Housing Act 1996 (Consequential Provisions) Order 1996; Inheritance Tax (Indexation) Order 1996; Finance Act 1997; National Lottery Act 1998; Finance Act 1998; Inheritance Tax (Indexation) Order 1998; Finance Act 1999; Inheritance Tax (Indexation) Order 1999; Scotland Act 1998 (Modification of Functions) Order 1999; Limited Liability Partnerships Act 2000; Countryside and Rights of Way Act 2000; Land Registration Act 2002; Finance Act 2002; Income Tax (Earnings and Pensions) Act 2003; Finance Act 2003; Finance Act 2004; Inheritance Tax (Indexation) Order 2004; Constitutional Reform Act 2005; Income Tax (Trading and Other Income) Act 2005; Finance Act 2005; Tax and Civil Partnership Regulations 2005; Natural Environment and Rural Communities Act 2006; Finance Act 2006; Armed Forces Act 2006; Income Tax Act 2007; Finance Act 2007; Statistics and Registration Service Act 2007; Legal Services Act 2007; Finance Act 2008; Housing and Regeneration Act 2008; Corporation Tax Act 2009; Finance Act 2009; Marine and Coastal Access Act 2009; Transfer of Tribunal Functions and Revenue and Customs Appeals Order 2009; Enactment of Extra-Statutory Concessions Order 2009; Transfer of Tribunal Functions (Lands Tribunal and Miscellaneous Amendments) Order 2009; Companies Act 2006 (Consequential Amendments) (Taxes and National Insurance) Order 2009; Offshore Funds (Tax) Regulations 2009; Finance Act 2009, Section 96 and Schedule 48 (Appointed Day, Savings and Consequential Amendments) Order 2009; Corporation Tax Act 2010; Taxation (International and Other Provisions) Act 2010; Finance Act 2010; Crime and Security Act 2010; Finance (No. 3) Act 2010; Finance Act 2011; Finance Act 2012; Financial Services Act 2012; Public Bodies (Abolition of the National Endowment for Science, Technology and the Arts) Order 2012; Public Bodies (Abolition of the Commission for Rural Communities) Order 2012; Inheritance Tax (Market Makers and Discount Houses) Regulations 2012; Finance Act 2013; Tax Law Rewrite Acts (Amendment) Order 2013; Natural Resources Body for Wales (Functions) Order 2013; Inheritance and Trustees' Powers Act 2014; Finance Act 2014; Finance Act 2015; Finance (No. 2) Act 2015; Finance Act 2016; Wales Act 2017; Finance (No. 2) Act 2017; Finance Act 2018; Finance Act 2019; Taxes (Amendments) (EU Exit) Regulations 2019; Finance Act 2020; Social Security (Scotland) Act 2018 (Disability Assistance, Young Carer Grants, Short-term Assistance and Winter Heating Assistance) (Consequential Provision and Modifications) Order 2021; Historic Environment (Wales) Act 2023; Finance (No. 2) Act 2023; Finance (No. 2) Act 2024; Social Security (Scotland) Act 2018 (Disability Assistance) (Consequential Modifications) Order 2024; Finance Act 2025; Social Security (Scotland) Act 2018 (Scottish Adult Disability Living Allowance) (Consequential Modifications) Order 2025; Finance Act 2026

Status: Amended

Text of statute as originally enacted

Revised text of statute as amended

Text of the Inheritance Tax Act 1984 as in force today (including any amendments) within the United Kingdom, from legislation.gov.uk.

The Inheritance Tax Act 1984 (c. 51) is an act of the Parliament of the United Kingdom that consolidated enactments relating to capital transfer tax in the United Kingdom.

== Provisions ==
=== Repealed enactments ===
Section 277 of the act repealed 17 enactments, listed in schedule 9 to the act.

Enactments repealed by section 277
Citation	Short title	Extent of repeal
1975 c. 7	Finance Act 1975	Section 19(1).
1975 c. 7	Finance Act 1975	Sections 20 to 47.
1975 c. 7	Finance Act 1975	In section 49, subsections (3) and (5).
1975 c. 7	Finance Act 1975	Section 51.
1975 c. 7	Finance Act 1975	Schedule 4, except paragraph 38.
1975 c. 7	Finance Act 1975	Schedules 5, 6 and 7.
1975 c. 7	Finance Act 1975	Schedules 9 and 10.
1975 c. 7	Finance Act 1975	In Schedule 12, paragraphs 1, 8(b) and 18(3).
1976 c. 40	Finance Act 1976	Sections 73 to 125.
1976 c. 40	Finance Act 1976	Section 132(3)(d).
1976 c. 40	Finance Act 1976	Schedules 10 to 14.
1977 c. 36	Finance Act 1977	Sections 52 and 53.
1977 c. 36	Finance Act 1977	Section 59(3)(d).
1978 c. 42	Finance Act 1978	Sections 64 to 74.
1978 c. 42	Finance Act 1978	Section 80(3)(d).
1978 c. 42	Finance Act 1978	In Schedule 11, paragraph 3.
1979 c. 14	Capital Gains Tax Act 1979	In paragraph 8 of Schedule 7, in the Table, the entries relating to the Finance Act 1975.
1979 c. 14	Capital Gains Tax Act 1979	In paragraph 9 of Schedule 7, in the Table, the entries relating to the Finance Act 1975, section 82 of and the Schedules to the Finance Act 1976, and section 64 of the Finance Act 1978.
1979 c. 46	Ancient Monuments and Archaeological Areas Act 1979	In Schedule 4, paragraph 15.
1980 c. 17	National Heritage Act 1980	Section 12(1).
1980 c. 17	National Heritage Act 1980	In section 12(2), the words from "(which" onwards.
1980 c. 17	National Heritage Act 1980	Section 13(1).
1980 c. 48	Finance Act 1980	Sections 85 to 87.
1980 c. 48	Finance Act 1980	Sections 92 and 93.
1980 c. 48	Finance Act 1980	Section 94, except subsection (7).
1980 c. 48	Finance Act 1980	Section 118(5).
1980 c. 48	Finance Act 1980	Section 122(3)(b).
1980 c. 48	Finance Act 1980	Schedules 14 and 15.
1981 c. 35	Finance Act 1981	Section 46(8).
1981 c. 35	Finance Act 1981	Sections 92 to 95.
1981 c. 35	Finance Act 1981	Section 96(1) and (2).
1981 c. 35	Finance Act 1981	In section 96(3), the words from the beginning to "and" at the end of paragraph (d), and in paragraph (e) the words from "for the" to "1981, and".
1981 c. 35	Finance Act 1981	Sections 97 to 106.
1981 c. 35	Finance Act 1981	In section 135(1), the words "capital transfer tax".
1981 c. 35	Finance Act 1981	Section 139(4).
1981 c. 35	Finance Act 1981	Schedules 13 and 14.
1981 c. 54	Senior Courts Act 1981	In Schedule 5, the entry relating to the Finance Act 1980.
1981 c. 66	Compulsory Purchase (Vesting Declarations) Act 1981	In Schedule 3, paragraph 2.
1982 c. 39	Finance Act 1982	Sections 90 to 127.
1982 c. 39	Finance Act 1982	Section 131.
1982 c. 39	Finance Act 1982	Section 157(4).
1982 c. 39	Finance Act 1982	In Schedule 10, paragraphs 1(2), 2(2)(a) and (3), and 3(2)(a) and (b).
1982 c. 39	Finance Act 1982	Schedules 14 to 17.
1982 c. 50	Insurance Companies Act 1982	In Schedule 5, paragraph 28(a).
1983 c. 20	Mental Health Act 1983	In Schedule 4, paragraph 40.
1983 c. 28	Finance Act 1983	Section 46(5).
1983 c. 28	Finance Act 1983	Section 47.
1983 c. 28	Finance Act 1983	In Schedule 9, paragraphs 3 to 7.
1983 c. 49	Finance (No. 2) Act 1983	Sections 8 to 13.
1983 c. 49	Finance (No. 2) Act 1983	Section 16(3).
1984 c. 43	Finance Act 1984	Section 96(8).
1984 c. 43	Finance Act 1984	Sections 101 to 107.
1984 c. 43	Finance Act 1984	Section 128(4).
1984 c. 43	Finance Act 1984	In Schedule 9, paragraph 13.
1984 c. 43	Finance Act 1984	In Schedule 14, paragraph 16.
1984 c. 43	Finance Act 1984	In Schedule 21, paragraphs 1 to 17, 19(6) and 20 to 26.
1984 c. 43	Finance Act 1984	In Schedule 22, in paragraph 6, the words from "and paragraph" to "Act 1975".

== Subsequent developments ==
The act was originally cited as the Capital Transfer Tax Act 1984. (Note: Section 278.) Section 100(1) of the Finance Act 1986 renamed the tax charged under the act from capital transfer tax to inheritance tax, and accordingly renamed the act to the Inheritance Tax Act 1984. The act has since been substantially amended, principally by successive Finance Acts.
