= Finance (No. 2) Act 2005 =

Act of the Parliament of the United Kingdom

Finance (No. 2) Act 2005 (Note: Section 72.)
- Act of Parliament
- Parliament of the United Kingdom
- Long title: An Act to grant certain duties, to alter other duties, and to amend the law relating to the National Debt and the Public Revenue, and to make further provision in connection with finance.
- Citation: 2005 c. 22
- Territorial extent: United Kingdom

Dates
- Royal assent: 20 July 2005
- Commencement: 20 July 2005 (Note: Section 4(b) of the Interpretation Act 1978.)
Other legislation
| Amends | National Savings Bank Act 1971; Value Added Tax Act 1994; Capital Allowances Act 2001 |

Status: Amended

Text of statute as originally enacted

Revised text of statute as amended

The Finance (No. 2) Act 2005 (c. 22) is an act of the Parliament of the United Kingdom.

== Section 2 - Cars: determination of consideration for fuel supplied for private use ==
The Finance (No.2) Act 2005, Section 2(7), (Appointed Day) Order 2007 (S.I. 2007/946 (C. 38)) was made under section 2(7).

== Section 6 - Disclosure of value added tax avoidance schemes ==
The Finance (No. 2) Act 2005, section 6, (Appointed Day and Savings Provisions) Order 2005 (S.I. 2005/2010 (C. 88)) was made under sections 6(2) and (3).

== Section 13 - Corporation tax exemption for organisations ==
The Finance (No. 2) Act 2005, Section 13 (Corporation Tax Exemption for Scientific Research Organisations) (Appointed Day) Order 2007 (S.I. 2007/3424 (C. 145)) was made under section 13(6).

== Section 19 - Section 17: commencement and procedure ==
The Finance (No. 2) Act 2005, Section 17(1), (Appointed Day) Order 2006 (S.I. 2006/982 (C. 29)) was made under section 19(1).

== Section 45 - Lloyd's underwriters: assessment and collection of tax ==
The Finance (No. 2) Act 2005, Section 45, (Appointed Day) Order 2005 (S.I. 2005/3337 (C. 142)) was made under section 45(9).

== Section 48 - Disclosure of information contained in land transaction returns ==
The Finance (No. 2) Act 2005, Sections 48(1) to (4) (Appointed Day) Order 2009 (S.I. 2009/2094 (C. 155)) was made under section 48(5).

== See also ==
- Finance Act
