= Finance Act 2006 =

Act of the Parliament of the United Kingdom

Finance Act 2006 (Note: Section 180.)
- Act of Parliament
- Parliament of the United Kingdom
- Long title: An Act to grant certain duties, to alter other duties, and to amend the law relating to the National Debt and the Public Revenue, and to make further provision in connection with finance.
- Citation: 2006 c. 25
- Territorial extent: United Kingdom

Dates
- Royal assent: 19 July 2006
- Commencement: 19 July 2006 (Note: Section 4(b) of the Interpretation Act 1978.)
Other legislation
Amends	Betting and Gaming Duties Act 1981; Inheritance Tax Act 1984; Value Added Tax Act 1994

Status: Amended

History of passage through Parliament

Text of statute as originally enacted

Revised text of statute as amended

The Finance Act 2006 (c. 25) is an act of the Parliament of the United Kingdom prescribing changes to Excise Duties; Value Added Tax; Income Tax; Corporation Tax; and Capital Gains Tax. It enacts the 2006 Budget speech made by Chancellor of the Exchequer Gordon Brown to the Parliament of the United Kingdom.

In the UK, the Chancellor delivers an annual Budget speech outlining changes in spending, tax and duty. The respective year's Finance Act is the mechanism to enact the changes.

The rules governing the various taxation methods are contained within the various taxation acts. (For instance Capital Gains Tax Legislation is contained within Taxation of Chargeable Gains Act 1992.) The Finance Act details amendments to be made to a variety of such acts.

The act made changes to the treatment of trusts for Inheritance Tax purposes. Specifically, it removed the exemption from inheritance tax for accumulation and maintenance trusts.

== Section 28 - Relief for research and development: subjects of clinical trials ==
The Finance Act 2006, Section 28 (Appointed Day) Order 2008 (S.I. 2008/1878 (C.80) was made under section 28(5).
