= Office of Tax Simplification =

The Office of Tax Simplification was an independent office of HM Treasury, part of the Government of the United Kingdom. The office was created on 20 July 2010 to identify complexities in the tax system burdensome to both businesses and individual taxpayers in order to recommend their reduction. The office was tasked with publishing its findings for the Chancellor of the Exchequer to consider ahead of the budget. The office was abolished in 2023.

== History ==
The initial board members were Michael Jack (Chairman), who as a former MP and Financial Secretary to the Treasury established the Tax Law Rewrite Project, and John Whiting (Tax Director) who is the first Tax Policy Director of the Chartered Institute of Taxation. Jack and Whiting were appointed on an interim basis to lead the Office for the first year, and confirmed in office in September 2011. Along with the members of committees established to support the work of the Office, they are not paid for their work.

They were supported by a small secretariat, including tax experts from HM Revenue and Customs and the Treasury and externally funded secondees from the tax and legal professions. The first set of private sector secondees were Tom Byng, Caroline Turnbull-Hall, Partha Ray and Kate Cottrell, who joined Jeremy Sherwood, Tunde Ojetola and Anish Mehta.

The OTS submitted two reports to the Chancellor in March 2011. These are the Review of Tax Reliefs and the Review of Small Business Taxation. The Chancellor accepted some of the recommendations in his Budget announcement where he agreed to abolish 43 reliefs.

In 2015, former MP Angela Knight CBE was appointed chair and in November 2016, the appointment of Paul Morton as Tax Director was announced. In March 2019, Kathryn Cearns OBE was appointed OTS chair. Bill Dodwell was appointed Tax Director from 15 January 2019. In 2016, the OTS was put on a statutory footing by Finance Act 2016.

=== Abolition ===
The Office of Tax Simplification was closed by the Government of the United Kingdom in March 2023. The decision was announced on 23 September 2022 in the Growth Plan 2022, and came into effect when the Spring 2023 Finance Bill received Royal Assent. The decision to close the budget was scrutinized by members of the Treasury Select Committee, including committee chair Harriett Baldwin.

During the lifetime of The Office of Tax Simplification the number of pages in the UK tax code rose from approximately 11,000 in July 2010 to 22,264 in March 2023 (an increase of over 100%).

== See also ==
- Tax Law Rewrite Project
