= Finance Act 2015 =

Act of the Parliament of the United Kingdom

Finance Act 2015 (Note: Section 127.)
- Act of Parliament
- Parliament of the United Kingdom
- Long title: An Act to grant certain duties, to alter other duties, and to amend the law relating to the National Debt and the Public Revenue, and to make further provision in connection with finance.
- Citation: 2015 c. 11
- Territorial extent: United Kingdom

Dates
- Royal assent: 26 March 2015
- Commencement: 26 March 2015 (Note: Section 4(b) of the Interpretation Act 1978.)
Other legislation
Amends	Revenue, Friendly Societies, and National Debt Act 1882; Provisional Collection of Taxes Act 1968; Taxes Management Act 1970; Oil Taxation Act 1975; Alcoholic Liquor Duties Act 1979; Finance Act 1989; Inheritance Tax Act 1984; Social Security Contributions and Benefits Act 1992; Social Security Contributions and Benefits (Northern Ireland) Act 1992; Taxation of Chargeable Gains Act 1992; Vehicle Excise and Registration Act 1994; Value Added Tax Act 1994; Finance Act 1996; Finance Act 1997; Finance Act 1998; Finance Act 2000; Capital Allowances Act 2001; Finance Act 2001; Income Tax (Earnings and Pensions) Act 2003; Finance Act 2004; Income Tax (Trading and Other Income) Act 2005; Finance Act 2005; Income Tax Act 2007; Finance Act 2007; Finance Act 2008; Corporation Tax Act 2009; Finance Act 2009; Corporation Tax Act 2010; Taxation (International and Other Provisions) Act 2010; Finance Act 2010; Finance Act 2011; Finance Act 2012; Finance Act 2013; Co-operative and Community Benefit Societies Act 2014; Finance Act 2014; Van Benefit and Car and Van Fuel Benefit Order 2014
Repeals/revokes	Revenue, Friendly Societies, and National Debt Act 1882; National Debt (Conversion) Act 1888
Amended by	Finance (No. 2) Act 2015; Finance Act 2016; Finance (No. 2) Act 2017; Finance Act 2019

Status: Amended

History of passage through Parliament

Text of statute as originally enacted

Revised text of statute as amended

The Finance Act 2015 is an act of the Parliament of the United Kingdom enacting the 2015 United Kingdom budget. The Chancellor of the Exchequer delivers the annual budget speech outlining changes in spending, tax, duty and other financial matters. The respective year's Finance Act is the mechanism to enact the changes. Levels of excise duties, value-added tax, income tax, corporation tax and capital gains tax) are often modified.

The rules governing the various taxation methods are contained within the relevant taxation acts. (For instance, capital gains tax legislation is contained within Taxation of Chargeable Gains Act 1992). The Finance Act details amendments to be made to each one of these acts.

The bill for consideration was called 'Finance (No.2) Bill 2015', although it passed into law as 'Finance Act 2015'.
