= Value Added Tax Act 1994 =

Act of the Parliament of the United Kingdom

Value Added Tax Act 1994 (Note: Section 102.)
- Act of Parliament
- Parliament of the United Kingdom
- Long title: An Act to consolidate the enactments relating to value added tax, including certain enactments relating to VAT tribunals.
- Citation: 1994 c. 23
- Territorial extent: United Kingdom (Note: Section 101(3).)

Dates
- Royal assent: 5 July 1994
- Commencement: 1 September 1994 (Note: Section 101(1).)

Other legislation
- Amends: Commonwealth Secretariat Act 1966; International Organisations Act 1968; Customs and Excise Management Act 1979; Judicial Pensions and Retirement Act 1993; See § Repealed enactments
- Repeals/revokes: See § Repealed enactments
- Amended by: List: Value Added Tax (Increase of Registration Limits) Order 1994; Value Added Tax (Education) (No. 2) Order 1994; Value Added Tax (Buildings and Land) Order 1994; Value Added Tax (Transport) Order 1994; Value Added Tax (Means of Transport) Order 1994; Finance Act 1995; Health Authorities Act 1995; Merchant Shipping Act 1995; Civil Evidence Act 1995; Criminal Procedure (Consequential Provisions) (Scotland) Act 1995; Value Added Tax (Buildings and Land) Order 1995; Value Added Tax (Construction of Buildings) Order 1995; Value Added Tax (Land) Order 1995; Value Added Tax (Protected Buildings) Order 1995; Value Added Tax (Supply of Pharmaceutical Goods) Order 1995; Value Added Tax (Transport) Order 1995; Local Government Reorganisation (Wales) (Consequential Amendments No. 2) Order 1995; Historic Monuments and Archaeological Objects (Northern Ireland) Order 1995; Value Added Tax (Increase of Registration Limits) Order 1995; Value Added Tax (Ships and Aircraft) Order 1995; Value Added Tax (Increase of Consideration for Fuel) Order 1995; Value Added Tax (Tax Free Shops) Order 1995; Finance Act 1996; Nursery Education and Grant-Maintained Schools Act 1996; Education Act 1996; Value Added Tax Act 1994 (Interest on Tax)(Prescribed Rate) Order 1996; Transfer of Functions (Registration and Statistics) Order 1996; Local Government (Transitional and Consequential Provisions and Revocations) (Scotland) Order 1996; Value Added Tax (Cultural Services) Order 1996; Value Added Tax (Anti-avoidance (Heating)) Order 1996; Value Added Tax (Increase of Consideration for Fuel) Order 1996; Value Added Tax (Pharmaceutical Chemists) Order 1996; Value Added Tax (Increase of Registration Limits) Order 1996; Planning (Consequential Provisions) (Scotland) Act 1997; Finance Act 1997; Nurses, Midwives and Health Visitors Act 1997; Value Added Tax (Registered Social Landlords) (No. 1) Order 1997; Value Added Tax (Registered Social Landlords) (No. 2) Order 1997; Finance (No. 2) Act 1997; Value Added Tax (Finance) Order 1997; Value Added Tax (Reverse Charge) (Anti-avoidance) Order 1997; Value Added Tax (Increase of Registration Limits) Order 1997; Further Education (Northern Ireland) Order 1997; Value Added Tax (Payments on Account) (Appeals) Order 1997; Value Added Tax (Drugs, Medicines and Aids for the Handicapped) Order 1997; Civil Evidence (Northern Ireland) Order 1997; School Standards and Framework Act 1998; Finance Act 1998; Government of Wales Act 1998; Scotland Act 1998; Value Added Tax (Increase of Registration Limits) Order 1998; Value Added Tax (Sport, Sports Competitions and Physical Education) Order 1998; Value Added Tax (Increase of Consideration for Fuel) Order 1998; Value Added Tax (Osteopaths) Order 1998; Value Added Tax (Reduced Rate) Order 1998; Education (Northern Ireland) Order 1998; Health Act 1999; Finance Act 1999; Youth Justice and Criminal Evidence Act 1999; Greater London Authority Act 1999; Value Added Tax (Buildings and Land) Order 1999; Value Added Tax (Finance) Order 1999; Value Added Tax (Increase of Registration Limits) Order 1999; Value Added Tax (Chiropractors) Order 1999; Value Added Tax (Abolition of Zero-Rating for Tax-Free Shops) Order 1999; Scotland Act 1998 (Consequential Modifications) (No.2) Order 1999; Value Added Tax (Sport, Sports Competitions and Physical Education) Order 1999; Criminal Evidence (Northern Ireland) Order 1999; Value Added Tax (Supplies of Goods where Input Tax cannot be recovered) Order 1999; Value Added Tax (Subscriptions to Trade Unions, Professional and Other Public Interest Bodies) Order 1999; Value Added Tax (Investment Gold) Order 1999; Abolition of Feudal Tenure etc. (Scotland) Act 2000; Standards in Scotland’s Schools etc. Act 2000; Capital Allowances Act 2001; Criminal Justice and Police Act 2001; National Health Service Reform and Health Care Professions Act 2002; Tax Credits Act 2002; Finance Act 2002; Enterprise Act 2002 (repealed); Secretaries of State for Education and Skills and for Work and Pensions Order 2002; Finance Act 2003; Communications Act 2003; Value Added Tax (Health and Welfare) Order 2003; Courts Act 2003; Health and Social Care (Community Health and Standards) Act 2003; Criminal Justice Act 2003; Value Added Tax (Reverse Charge) (Amendment) Order 2003; Value Added Tax (Consideration for Fuel Provided for Private Use) Order 2003; Value Added Tax (Increase of Registration Limits) Order 2003; Value Added Tax (Finance) Order 2003; Value Added Tax (Finance) (No. 2) Order 2003; Enterprise Act 2002 (Insolvency) Order 2003; Money Laundering Regulations 2003; Mutual Assistance Provisions Order 2003; Finance Act 2004; Value Added Tax (Increase of Registration Limits) Order 2004; Value Added Tax (Consideration for Fuel Provided for Private Use) Order 2004; Value Added Tax (Reduced Rate) Order 2004; Value Added Tax (Buildings and Land) Order 2004; Criminal Justice (Evidence) (Northern Ireland) Order 2004; Value Added Tax (Insurance) Order 2004; Value Added Tax (Reverse Charge) (Gas and Electricity) Order 2004; Value Added Tax (Food) Order 2004; Constitutional Reform Act 2005; Commissioners for Revenue and Customs Act 2005; Finance (No. 2) Act 2005; Value Added Tax (Consideration for Fuel Provided for Private Use) Order 2005; Value Added Tax (Reduced Rate) Order 2005; Value Added Tax (Increase of Registration Limits) Order 2005; Dentists Act 1984 (Amendment) Order 2005; National Council for Education and Training for Wales (Transfer of Functions to the National Assembly for Wales and Abolition) Order 2005; Value Added Tax (Betting, Gaming and Lotteries) Order 2005; Value Added Tax (Reduced Rate) (No. 2) Order 2005; Finance Act 2006; Government of Wales Act 2006; National Health Service (Consequential Provisions) Act 2006; Value Added Tax (Consideration for Fuel Provided for Private Use) Order 2006; Value Added Tax (Increase of Registration Limits) Order 2006; Value Added Tax (Reduced Rate) Order 2006; Value Added Tax (Lifeboats) Order 2006; Medical Act 1983 (Amendment) and Miscellaneous Amendments Order 2006; Veterinary Medicines Regulations 2006; Value Added Tax (Betting, Gaming and Lotteries) Order 2006; Value Added Tax (Gaming Machines) Order 2006; Finance Act 2007; Tribunals, Courts and Enforcement Act 2007; Statistics and Registration Service Act 2007; Value Added Tax (Health and Welfare) Order 2007; Pharmacists and Pharmacy Technicians Order 2007; Value Added Tax (Amendment of section 77A of the Value Added Tax Act 1994) Order 2007; Value Added Tax (Increase of Registration Limits) Order 2007; Value Added Tax (Consideration for Fuel Provided for Private Use) Order 2007; Value Added Tax (Administration, Collection and Enforcement) Order 2007; Value Added Tax (Reduced Rate) Order 2007; Money Laundering Regulations 2007 (revoked); Value Added Tax (Betting, Gaming and Lotteries) Order 2007; Companies Act 2006 (Commencement No. 3, Consequential Amendments, Transitional Provisions and Savings) Order 2007; European Qualifications (Health and Social Care Professions) Regulations 2007; Value Added Tax (Reduced Rate) (No. 2) Order 2007; Finance Act 2008; Health and Social Care Act 2008; Local Transport Act 2008; Value Added Tax (Increase of Registration Limits) Order 2008; Value Added Tax (Consideration for Fuel Provided for Private Use) Order 2008; Companies Act 2006 (Consequential Amendments) (Taxes and National Insurance) Order 2008; Value Added Tax (Buildings and Land) Order 2008; Value Added Tax (Finance) Order 2008; Value Added Tax (Finance) (No. 2) Order 2008; Value Added Tax (Reduced Rate) (Supplies of Domestic Fuel or Power) Order 2008; Value Added Tax (Change of Rate) Order 2008; Finance Act 2009; Transfer of Tribunal Functions and Revenue and Customs Appeals Order 2009; Finance Act 2008, Schedule 40 (Appointed Day, Transitional Provisions and Consequential Amendments) Order 2009; Enactment of Extra-Statutory Concessions Order 2009; Value Added Tax (Consideration for Fuel Provided for Private Use) Order 2009; Value Added Tax (Increase of Registration Limits) Order 2009; Value Added Tax (Reduced Rate) (Children’s Car Seats) Order 2009; Companies Act 2006 (Consequential Amendments) (Taxes and National Insurance) Order 2009; Value Added Tax (Buildings and Land) Order 2009; Value Added Tax (Emissions Allowances) Order 2009; Value Added Tax (Drugs and Medicines) Order 2009; Corporation Tax Act 2010; Finance Act 2010; Finance (No. 2) Act 2010; Finance (No. 3) Act 2010; Pharmacy Order 2010; Value Added Tax (Buildings and Land) Order 2010; Value Added Tax (Construction of Buildings) Order 2010; Finance Act 2008 (Penalties for Errors and Failure to Notify etc) (Consequential Amendments) Order 2010; Value Added Tax (Consideration for Fuel Provided for Private Use) Order 2010; Value Added Tax (Increase of Registration Limits) Order 2010; Apprenticeships, Skills, Children and Learning Act 2009 (Consequential Amendments) (England and Wales) Order 2010; Value Added Tax (Emissions Allowances) Order 2010; Value Added Tax (Exceptions Relating to Supplies not Made to Relevant Business Person) Order 2010; Finance Act 2011; Police Reform and Social Responsibility Act 2011; Education Act 2011; Planning Act (Northern Ireland) 2011; Value Added Tax (Buildings and Land) Order 2011; Value Added Tax (Increase of Registration Limits) Order 2011; Value Added Tax (Consideration for Fuel Provided for Private Use) Order 2011; Treaty of Lisbon (Changes in Terminology) Order 2011; Postal Services Act 2011 (Consequential Modifications and Amendments) Order 2011; Welfare Reform Act 2012; Health and Social Care Act 2012; Finance Act 2012; Financial Services Act 2012; Value Added Tax (Land Exemption) Order 2012; Housing (Scotland) Act 2010 (Consequential Provisions and Modifications) Order 2012; Value Added Tax (Consideration for Fuel Provided for Private Use) Order 2012; Value Added Tax (Increase of Registration Limits) Order 2012; Human Medicines Regulations 2012; Value Added Tax (Place of Supply of Services) (Transport of Goods) Order 2012; Value Added Tax (Relief for European Research Infrastructure Consortia) Order 2012; Finance Act 2013; Value Added Tax (Reduced Rate) (Cable-Suspended Passenger Transport Systems) Order 2013; Value Added Tax (Independence Payment) Order 2013; Universal Credit (Consequential, Supplementary, Incidental and Miscellaneous Provisions) Regulations 2013; Value Added Tax (Consideration for Fuel Provided for Private Use) Order 2013; Value Added Tax (Increase of Registration Limits) Order 2013; Value Added Tax (Finance) Order 2013; Alternative Investment Fund Managers Regulations 2013; Value Added Tax (Education) Order 2013; Children and Families Act 2014; Finance Act 2014; Value Added Tax (Increase of Registration Limits) Order 2014; Value Added Tax (Drugs and Medicines) Order 2014; Revenue and Customs (Amendment of Appeal Provisions for Out of Time Reviews) Order 2014; Value Added Tax (Place of Supply of Services) (Exceptions Relating to Supplies Not Made to Relevant Business Person) Order 2014; Value Added Tax (Sport) Order 2014; Finance Act 2015; Deregulation Act 2015; Legal Aid, Sentencing and Punishment of Offenders Act 2012 (Fines on Summary Conviction) Regulations 2015; Value Added Tax (Increase of Registration Limits) Order 2015; National Health Service (General Medical Services Contracts) Regulations 2015; Value Added Tax (Caravans) Order 2015; Welfare Reform (Northern Ireland) Order 2015; Finance Act 2016; Universal Credit (Consequential, Supplementary, Incidental and Miscellaneous Provisions) Regulations (Northern Ireland) 2016; Value Added Tax (Increase of Registration Limits) Order 2016; Value Added Tax (Drugs, Medicines, Aids and Charities, etc.) Order 2016; Value Added Tax (Place of Supply of Services: Exceptions Relating to Supplies Made to Relevant Business Person) Order 2016; Bankruptcy (Scotland) Act 2016 (Consequential Provisions and Modifications) Order 2016; Finance Act 2017; Children and Social Work Act 2017; Finance (No. 2) Act 2017; Value Added Tax (Increase of Registration Limits) Order 2017; Enactment of Extra-Statutory Concessions Order 2017; Value Added Tax (Place of Supply of Services) (Telecommunication Services) Order 2017; Finance Act 2018; Taxation (Cross-border Trade) Act 2018; Nursing and Midwifery (Amendment) Order 2018; Value Added Tax (Place of Supply of Services) (Supplies of Electronic, Telecommunication and Broadcasting Services) Order 2018 (revoked); Value Added Tax (Special Accounting Schemes) (Supplies of Electronic, Telecommunication and Broadcasting Services) Order 2018 (revoked); Finance Act 2019; Value Added Tax (Finance) (EU Exit) Order 2019; Value Added Tax (Tour Operators) (Amendment) (EU Exit) Regulations 2019; Value Added Tax (Place of Supply of Services) (Supplies of Electronic, Telecommunication and Broadcasting Services) (Amendment and Revocation) (EU Exit) Order 2019; Value Added Tax (Reduced Rate) (Energy-Saving Materials) Order 2019; Higher Education and Research Act 2017 (Further Implementation etc.) Regulations 2019; Value Added Tax (Miscellaneous Amendments and Transitional Provisions) (EU Exit) Regulations 2019; Corporate Insolvency and Governance Act 2020; Finance Act 2020; Taxation (Post-transition Period) Act 2020; Value Added Tax (Finance) Order 2020; Value Added Tax (Drugs and Medicines) Order 2020; Value Added Tax (Zero Rate for Personal Protective Equipment) (Coronavirus) Order 2020; Value Added Tax (Extension of Zero-Rating to Electronically Supplied Books etc.) (Coronavirus) Order 2020; Value Added Tax (Zero Rate for Personal Protective Equipment) (Extension) (Coronavirus) Order 2020; Value Added Tax (Reduced Rate) (Hospitality and Tourism) (Coronavirus) Order 2020; Value Added Tax (Miscellaneous Amendments to Acts of Parliament) (EU Exit) Regulations 2020; Value Added Tax (Miscellaneous Amendments to the Value Added Tax Act 1994 and Revocation) (EU Exit) Regulations 2020; Finance Act 2021; Value Added Tax (Miscellaneous Amendments and Repeals) (EU Exit) Regulations 2021; Value Added Tax (Amendment) (EU Exit) Regulations 2021; Social Security (Scotland) Act 2018 (Disability Assistance, Young Carer Grants, Short-term Assistance and Winter Heating Assistance) (Consequential Provision and Modifications) Order 2021; Free Zones (Customs, Excise and Value Added Tax) Regulations 2021; Value Added Tax (Distance Selling and Miscellaneous Amendments) Regulations 2021; Value Added Tax (Distance Selling and Miscellaneous Amendments No. 2) Regulations 2021; Finance Act 2022; Health and Care Act 2022; Value Added Tax (Enforcement Related to Distance Selling and Miscellaneous Amendments) Regulations 2022; Social Security (Scotland) Act 2018 (Disability Assistance and Information-Sharing) (Consequential Provision and Modifications) Order 2022; Value Added Tax (Installation of Energy-Saving Materials) Order 2022; Health and Social Care Act (Northern Ireland) 2022 (Consequential Amendments) Order 2022; Finance Act 2009, Sections 101 and 102 (Value Added Tax) (Late Payment Interest and Repayment Interest) (Exceptions and Consequential Amendments) Order 2022; Historic Environment (Wales) Act 2023; Finance (No. 2) Act 2023; Health and Social Care Information Centre (Transfer of Functions, Abolition and Transitional Provisions) Regulations 2023; Health Education England (Transfer of Functions, Abolition and Transitional Provisions) Regulations 2023; Value Added Tax (Installation of Energy-Saving Materials) Order 2023; Value Added Tax Act 1994 (Schedule 9) (Exemptions: Health and Welfare) (Amendment) Order 2023; Value Added Tax (Women’s Sanitary Products: Reusable Underwear) Order 2023; Finance Act 2024; Finance (No. 2) Act 2024; Value Added Tax (Installation of Energy-Saving Materials) Order 2024; Value Added Tax (Distance Selling) (Amendments) Regulations 2024; Value Added Tax (Increase of Registration Limits) Order 2024; Value Added Tax (Caravans) Order 2024; Finance Act 2025; Finance Act 2026; Tertiary Education and Research (Wales) Act 2022 (Consequential Amendments) Order 2026

Status: Amended

Text of statute as originally enacted

Revised text of statute as amended

Text of the Value Added Tax Act 1994 as in force today (including any amendments) within the United Kingdom, from legislation.gov.uk.

The Value Added Tax Act 1994 (c. 23) is an act of the Parliament of the United Kingdom that consolidated enactments relating to value added tax in the United Kingdom.

The act is UK tax law, concerning taxation of goods and services that fall within the scope of Value Added Tax (VAT). It came into force on 1 September 1994. The act repealed and replaced the Value Added Tax Act 1983.

== Background ==
The act was enacted on 30 November 1994, and came into force on 1 January 1995. It replaced the earlier VAT legislation in the UK, which had been in place since 1973.

The introduction of the act was necessary to implement the European Union's VAT system in the UK. The EU had mandated that all member states should adopt a common VAT system, in order to simplify the tax system for businesses operating across borders.

== Provisions ==
- Part I - The charge to tax
- Part II - Reliefs, exemptions and repayments
- Part III - Application of act in particular cases.
- Part IV - Administration, collection and enforcement
- Part V - Appeals
- Part VI - Supplementary provisions

To encourage outsourcing it provides a mechanism through which government departments, including NHS trusts, can qualify for refunds on contracted out services.

=== Repealed enactments ===
Section 100(2) of the act repealed 44 enactments and revoked 58 instruments, listed in schedule 15 to the act.

Acts of Parliament
Citation	Short title	Extent of repeal
1979 c. 2	Customs and Excise Management Act 1979	Sections 100B and 100C.
1983 c. 55	Value Added Tax Act 1983	The whole act.
1984 c. 24	Dentists Act 1984	In Schedule 5, paragraph 16.
1984 c. 43	Finance Act 1984	Sections 10 to 13.
1984 c. 43	Finance Act 1984	Schedule 6.
1984 c. 51	Inheritance Tax Act 1984	In Schedule 8, paragraph 24.
1984 c. 60	Police and Criminal Evidence Act 1984	In Schedule 6, paragraph 41.
1985 c. 54	Finance Act 1985	Sections 11 to 33.
1985 c. 54	Finance Act 1985	Schedules 6, 7 and 8.
1985 c. 54	Finance Act 1985	In Schedule 26, paragraph 14.
1986 c. 41	Finance Act 1986	Sections 9 to 15.
1986 c. 41	Finance Act 1986	Schedule 6.
1987 c. 16	Finance Act 1987	Sections 11 to 19.
1987 c. 16	Finance Act 1987	Schedule 2.
1987 c. 18	Debtors (Scotland) Act 1987	In Schedule 4, paragraph 4.
1988 c. 39	Finance Act 1988	Sections 13 to 22.
1988 c. 54	Road Traffic (Consequential Provisions) Act 1988	In Schedule 3, paragraph 32.
1989 c. 26	Finance Act 1989	Sections 18 to 26.
1989 c. 26	Finance Act 1989	Schedule 3.
1989 c. 40	Companies Act 1989	In Schedule 18, paragraph 27.
1989 c. 44	Opticians Act 1989	Section 37(3).
1990 c. 11	Planning (Consequential Provisions) Act 1990	In Schedule 2, paragraph 61.
1990 c. 19	National Health Service and Community Care Act 1990	Section 61(4).
1990 c. 19	National Health Service and Community Care Act 1990	In Schedule 8, paragraph 9.
1990 c. 29	Finance Act 1990	Sections 10 to 16.
1990 c. 41	Courts and Legal Services Act 1990	In Schedule 10, paragraph 52.
1990 c. 42	Broadcasting Act 1990	In Schedule 20, paragraph 37.
1991 c. 21	Disability Living Allowance and Disability Working Allowance Act 1991	In Schedule 2, paragraph 13.
1991 c. 31	Finance Act 1991	Sections 13 to 18.
1992 c. 12	Taxation of Chargeable Gains Act 1992	In Schedule 10, paragraph 6.
1992 c. 20	Finance Act 1992	Sections 6 and 7.
1992 c. 48	Finance (No. 2) Act 1992	Sections 14(1) and (3) to (6).
1992 c. 48	Finance (No. 2) Act 1992	Sections 15 to 17.
1992 c. 48	Finance (No. 2) Act 1992	Schedule 3, Parts I and II.
1992 c. 52	Trade Union and Labour Relations (Consolidation) Act 1992	In Schedule 2, paragraph 32.
1992 c. 53	Tribunals and Inquiries Act 1992	In Schedule 3, paragraph 17.
1993 c. 8	Judicial Pensions and Retirement Act 1993	In Schedule 6, paragraph 35.
1993 c. 8	Judicial Pensions and Retirement Act 1993	In Schedule 8, paragraph 16.
1993 c. 34	Finance Act 1993	Sections 42 to 50.
1993 c. 34	Finance Act 1993	Schedule 2.
1994 c. 9	Finance Act 1994	Section 7(1) and (2).
1994 c. 9	Finance Act 1994	In section 18(3) the words from "and for" to the end.
1994 c. 9	Finance Act 1994	Sections 45 and 47.
1994 c. 22	Vehicle Excise and Registration Act 1994	In Schedule 3, paragraph 21.

Statutory Instruments
Citation	Title	Extent of revocation
SI 1980/440	Value Added Tax (Fuel and Power) Order 1980	The whole order.
SI 1983/1717	Value Added Tax (Charities Etc.) Order 1983	The whole order.
SI 1984/489	Value Added Tax (Handicapped Persons) Order 1984	The whole order.
SI 1984/631	Value Added Tax (Lifeboats) Order 1984	The whole order.
SI 1984/766	Value Added Tax (Charities Etc.) Order 1984	The whole order.
SI 1984/767	Value Added Tax (Marine etc. Insurance) Order 1984	The whole order.
SI 1984/959	Value Added Tax (Handicapped Persons) (No.2) Order 1984	The whole order.
SI 1984/1784	Value Added Tax (Optical Appliances) Order 1984	The whole order.
SI 1985/18	Value Added Tax (Protected Buildings) Order 1985	The whole order.
SI 1985/431	Value Added Tax (Charities Etc.) Order 1985	The whole order.
SI 1985/432	Value Added Tax (Finance) Order 1985	The whole order.
SI 1985/799	Value Added Tax (Hiring of Goods) Order 1985	The whole order.
SI 1985/919	Value Added Tax (Handicapped Persons) Order 1985	Article 3.
SI 1985/1900	Value Added Tax (Welfare) Order 1985	The whole order.
SI 1986/530	Value Added Tax (Handicapped Persons and Charities) Order 1986	The whole order.
SI 1987/437	Value Added Tax (Charities) Order 1987	The whole order.
SI 1987/517	Value Added Tax (Betting, Gaming and Lotteries) Order 1987	The whole order.
SI 1987/518	Value Added Tax (International Services) Order 1987	The whole order.
SI 1987/860	Value Added Tax (Finance) Order 1987	The whole order.
SI 1987/1072	Value Added Tax (Construction of Buildings) (No.2) Order 1987	Article 2.
SI 1987/1259	Value Added Tax (Education) Order 1987	The whole order.
SI 1987/1806	Value Added Tax (Tour Operators) Order 1987	Article 11.
SI 1988/507	Value Added Tax (Confectionery) Order 1988	The whole order.
SI 1988/1282	Value Added Tax (Training) Order 1988	The whole order.
SI 1989/267	Value Added Tax (Education) Order 1989	The whole order.
SI 1989/470	Value Added Tax (Fund-Raising Events and Charities) Order 1989	The whole order.
SI 1989/2272	Value Added Tax (Finance, Health and Welfare) Order 1989	The whole order.
SI 1990/682	Value Added Tax (Increase of Registration Limits) Order 1990	The whole order.
SI 1990/750	Value Added Tax (Charities) Order 1990	The whole order.
SI 1990/752	Value Added Tax (Transport) Order 1990	The whole order.
SI 1990/2037	Value Added Tax (Insurance) Order 1990	The whole order.
SI 1990/2129	Value Added Tax (Charities) (No.2) Order 1990	The whole order.
SI 1990/2553	Value Added Tax (Construction of Dwellings and Land) Order 1990	The whole order.
SI 1991/737	Value Added Tax (Charities) Order 1991	The whole order.
SI 1991/738	Value Added Tax (Increase of Registration Limits) Order 1991	The whole order.
SI 1991/2534	Value Added Tax (Piped Gas) (Metrication) Order 1991	The whole order.
SI 1991/2569	Value Added Tax (Buildings and Land) Order 1991	The whole order.
SI 1992/628	Value Added Tax (Charities and Aids for Handicapped Persons) Order 1992	The whole order.
SI 1992/629	Value Added Tax (Increase of Registration Limits) Order 1992	The whole order.
SI 1992/733	Value Added Tax (Increase for Consideration for Fuel) Order 1992	The whole order.
SI 1992/3065	Value Added Tax (Motor Vehicles for the Handicapped) Order 1992	The whole order.
SI 1992/3126	Value Added Tax (Transport) Order 1992	The whole order.
SI 1992/3127	Value Added Tax (Means of Transport) Order 1992	The whole order.
SI 1992/3131	Value Added Tax (Tax Free Shops) Order 1992	The whole order.
SI 1992/3223	Value Added Tax (International Services and Transport) Order 1992	The whole order.
SI 1993/765	Value Added Tax (Increase for Consideration for Fuel) Order 1993	The whole order.
SI 1993/766	Value Added Tax (Increase of Registration Limits) Order 1993	The whole order.
SI 1993/767	Value Added Tax (Protective Boots and Helmets) Order 1993	The whole order.
SI 1993/1124	Value Added Tax (Education) (No.2) Order 1993	The whole order.
SI 1993/2214	Finance Act 1993 (Appointed Day) Order 1993	The whole order.
SI 1993/2328	Value Added Tax (Reverse Charge) Order 1993	The whole order.
SI 1993/2498	Value Added Tax (Beverages) Order 1993	The whole order.
SI 1993/2498	Value Added Tax (Beverages) Order 1983	The whole order.
SI 1993/2952	Value Added Tax (Increase of Consideration for Fuel) (No.2) Order 1993	The whole order.
SI 1993/2953	Value Added Tax (Increase of Registration Limits) (No.2) Order 1993	The whole order.
SI 1994/686	Value Added Tax (Tax Free Shops) Order 1994	The whole order.
SI 1994/687	Value Added Tax (Sport, Physical Education and Fund-Raising Events) Order 1994	The whole order.
SI 1994/1188	Value Added Tax (Education) Order 1994	The whole order.

== See also ==
- Income and Corporation Taxes Act 1988
- Corporation Tax Act 2010
