= Income Tax (Trading and Other Income) Act 2005 =

Act of the Parliament of the United Kingdom

Income Tax (Trading and Other Income) Act 2005 (Note: Section 886.)
- Act of Parliament
- Parliament of the United Kingdom
- Long title: An Act to restate, with minor changes, certain enactments relating to income tax on trading income, property income, savings and investment income and certain other income; and for connected purposes.
- Citation: 2005 c. 5
- Territorial extent: United Kingdom

Dates
- Royal assent: 24 March 2005
- Commencement: 6 April 2005 (Note: Section 863.)
Other legislation
Amends	Inheritance Tax Act 1984; Social Security Contributions and Benefits Act 1992; Social Security Contributions and Benefits (Northern Ireland) Act 1992; Pension Schemes (Northern Ireland) Act 1993; Coal Industry Act 1994; Capital Allowances Act 2001
Amended by	Commissioners for Revenue and Customs Act 2005; National Health Service (Consequential Provisions) Act 2006; Income Tax Act 2007; Finance Act 2007; Statute Law (Repeals) Act 2013; Co-operative and Community Benefit Societies Act 2014; Finance Act 2015; Corporate Insolvency and Governance Act 2020; Finance Act 2026

Status: Amended

Text of statute as originally enacted

Revised text of statute as amended

The Income Tax (Trading and Other Income) Act 2005 (c. 5) is an act of the Parliament of the United Kingdom.

It restated certain legislation relating to income tax, with minor changes that were mainly intended "to clarify existing provisions, make them consistent or bring the law into line with well established practice." The bill was the work of the Tax Law Rewrite Project team at the Inland Revenue.

== Provisions ==
The act provides that unexplained wealth orders may be imposed on overseas companies and trusts.

The act allows for settlors to be liable for income tax where the trust is settlor-interested.

The act states that the definition of settlement includes "any disposition, trust, covenant, agreement, arrangement or transfer of assets”.
