= Taxation (International and Other Provisions) Act 2010 =

Act of the Parliament of the United Kingdom

Taxation (International and Other Provisions) Act 2010 (Note: Section 507.)
- Act of Parliament
- Parliament of the United Kingdom
- Long title: An Act to restate, with minor changes, certain enactments relating to tax; to make provision for purposes connected with the restatement of enactments by other tax law rewrite Acts; and for connected purposes.
- Citation: 2010 c. 8
- Introduced by: Alistair Darling MP, Chancellor of the Exchequer (Commons); Lord Myners (Lords)
- Territorial extent: England and Wales; Scotland; Northern Ireland; (Note: Section 505.)

Dates
- Royal assent: 18 March 2010
- Commencement: 1 April 2010 (Note: Section 506.)
Other legislation
| Amends | Inheritance Tax Act 1984; Jobseekers Act 1995; Petroleum Act 1998; Capital Allowances Act 2001 |
| Amended by | Statute Law (Repeals) Act 2013; Co-operative and Community Benefit Societies Act 2014; Finance Act 2015; Finance (No. 2) Act 2017; Finance Act 2026 |

Status: Amended

Text of statute as originally enacted

Revised text of statute as amended

The Taxation (International and Other Provisions) Act 2010 (c. 8) is an act of the Parliament of the United Kingdom that aims to 'restate, with minor changes, certain enactments relating to tax; to make provision for purposes connected with the restatement of enactments by other tax law rewrite Acts; and for connected purposes'.
