= Corporate Insolvency and Governance Act 2020 =

Act of the Parliament of the United Kingdom

Corporate Insolvency and Governance Act 2020 (Note: Section 50.)
- Act of Parliament
- Parliament of the United Kingdom
- Long title: An Act to make provision about companies and other entities in financial difficulty; and to make temporary changes to the law relating to the governance and regulation of companies and other entities.
- Citation: 2020 c. 12
- Introduced by: Alok Sharma, Secretary of State for Business, Energy and Industrial Strategy (Commons); Lord Callanan (Lords)
- Territorial extent: United Kingdom (Note: Section 48. Certain provisions have restricted territorial extent England and Wales, Scotland or Northern Ireland respectively)

Dates
- Royal assent: 25 June 2020
- Commencement: Various (Note: Section 49.)
Other legislation
Amends	Finance Act 1986; Insolvency Act 1986; Building Societies Act 1986; Insolvency (Northern Ireland) Order 1989; Water Industry Act 1991; Taxation of Chargeable Gains Act 1992; Friendly Societies Act 1992; Value Added Tax Act 1994; Partnerships Order (Northern Ireland) 1995; Housing Act 1996; Financial Services and Markets Act 2000; Limited Liability Partnerships Act 2000; Enterprise Act 2002; Income Tax (Earnings and Pensions) Act 2003; Energy Act 2004; Income Tax (Trading and Other Income) Act 2005; Insolvency (Northern Ireland) Order 2005; Companies Act 2006; Housing and Regeneration Act 2008; Corporation Tax Act 2009; Corporation Tax Act 2010; Third Parties (Rights against Insurers) Act 2010; Housing (Scotland) Act 2010; Charities Act 2011; Financial Services (Banking Reform) Act 2013; Mutuals' Deferred Shares Act 2015
Amended by	Co-operative and Community Benefit Societies and Credit Unions (Arrangements, Reconstructions and Administration) (Amendment) and Consequential Amendments Order 2020; Corporate Insolvency and Governance Act 2020 (Meetings of Scottish Charitable Incorporated Organisations) (Coronavirus) Regulations 2020; Corporate Insolvency and Governance Act 2020 (Coronavirus) (Extension of the Relevant Period) Regulations 2020; Corporate Insolvency and Governance Act 2020 (Coronavirus) (Amendment of Relevant Period for Meetings of Registered Societies and Credit Unions) Regulations (Northern Ireland) 2020; Corporate Insolvency and Governance Act 2020 (Coronavirus) (Suspension of Liability for Wrongful Trading and Extension of the Relevant Period) Regulations 2020; Corporate Insolvency and Governance Act 2020 (Meetings of Scottish Charitable Incorporated Organisations) (Coronavirus) (No. 2) Regulations 2020; Corporate Insolvency and Governance Act 2020 (Coronavirus) (Amendment of Relevant Period for Meetings of Registered Societies and Credit Unions No. 2) Regulations (Northern Ireland) 2020; Corporate Insolvency and Governance Act 2020 (Coronavirus) (Early Termination of Certain Temporary Provisions) Regulations 2020; Corporate Insolvency and Governance Act 2020 (Coronavirus) (Extension of the Relevant Period) Regulations 2021; Corporate Insolvency and Governance Act 2020 (Coronavirus) (Amendment of Schedule 10) (No. 2) Regulations 2021; Corporate Insolvency and Governance Act 2020 (Coronavirus) (Change of Expiry Date in section 32(1)) Regulations (Northern Ireland) 2021; Corporate Insolvency and Governance Act 2020 (Coronavirus) (Amendment of Schedule 11) Regulations (Northern Ireland) 2021; Corporate Insolvency and Governance Act 2020 (Coronavirus) (Amendment of Relevant Period in Schedule 8) (No. 2) Regulations (Northern Ireland) 2021; Corporate Insolvency and Governance Act 2020 (Coronavirus) (Early Termination of Part 2 of Schedule 8) Regulations (Northern Ireland) 2022

Status: Amended

History of passage through Parliament

Records of Parliamentary debate relating to the statute from Hansard

Text of statute as originally enacted

Revised text of statute as amended

The Corporate Insolvency and Governance Act 2020 (c. 12) is an act of the Parliament of the United Kingdom relating to companies and other entities in financial difficulty, and which makes temporary changes to laws relating to the governance and regulation of companies and other entities.

The bill was introduced as part of the government response to the COVID-19 pandemic in the United Kingdom and the primary intentions of the bill were to:

- introduce new corporate restructuring tools to the insolvency and restructuring regime to give companies the breathing space and tools required to maximise their chance of survival
- temporarily suspend parts of insolvency law to support directors to continue trading through the emergency without the threat of personal liability for wrongful trading and to protect companies from creditor action, and
- amend Company Law and other legislation to provide companies and other bodies with temporary easements on company filing and annual general meetings

The act commenced on 26 June 2020. It was amended by Statutory Instrument on 29 September 2020, to further extend certain time periods.

== Main provisions ==
=== Moratoriums ===
Sections 1 to 6 and Schedules 1 to 8 amended the Insolvency Act 1986 to provide for a moratorium for companies that are likely to become insolvent. The moratorium would allow insolvent companies or companies that are likely to become insolvent to obtain a 20 business day period in which they could seek to restructure or seek investment without creditor actions. This period may be extended by a further 20 days. The company's affairs must be monitored by a qualified insolvency practitioner during the moratorium period.

=== Arrangement and reconstructions ===
Section 7 and Schedule 9 amend the Companies Act 2006 to insert a new part into that act which will allow for companies in financial difficulty, or which are likely to encounter financial difficulties, to propose a restructuring plan which allows them to compromise certain creditors or shareholders.

The restructuring plans introduced under this section are modelled to the existing scheme or arrangement provisions but with the addition of the ability to cram down across classes of creditors.

=== Sales to connected persons ===
Certain provisions in the Insolvency Act 1986 which allowed for regulations to be made to prohibit or restrict the sale of company property by an administrator to a person connected to the company. These provisions were due to expire in May 2020 and were extended to June 2021.

=== Winding-up petitions ===
Sections 10 and 11 and Schedules 10 and 11 provide temporary provisions to restrict statutory demands and winding up petitions issued against companies during the COVID-19 pandemic in the United Kingdom. This provision will prevent such petitions being made until 30 September 2020 where the company is in financial difficulty as a result of the COVID-19 pandemic.

=== Wrongful trading ===
Sections 12 and 13 temporarily suspend the liability for wrongful trading for company directors by assuming that any worsening of the directors are not responsible for a worsening of the financial position of a company during the pandemic. These provisions do not apply to certain financial institutions and does not relax other offences that may arise under the Insolvency Act 1986 or the general duties of directors under the Companies Act 2006.

=== Termination clauses ===
Section 14 amends the Insolvency Act 1986 to prevent suppliers from terminating contracts where a company enters into insolvency proceedings, for breaches that occur prior to insolvency or make it a condition of future supplies that pre-insolvency arrears are paid. Exclusions were made from this provision where the contract would cause the supplier hardship, for certain small suppliers and a number of further exclusions were made in respect of certain entities, industries and types of supply as a new schedule to the Insolvency Act 1986.

=== Powers to amend insolvency legislation ===
Sections 20 to 27 gave further powers to the Secretary for State to make regulations to amend corporate insolvency or governance legislation. The powers given were limited to changes to the conditions that must be met before insolvency, changing the way in which the insolvency procedures applies and to change the duties of periods with corporate responsibility. Such provisions may only be used where such provisions are urgent and proportionate, cannot have effect for more than 12 months and cannot be made after 30 April 2021.

=== Meetings and filings ===
Section 37 and Schedule 14 provided for relaxations to the rules applying to requirement for companies to hold meetings during the pandemic to take account of lockdown and social distancing measures. The rules provide that shareholder meetings may be held electronically and voting at such meetings may be held electronically. The provisions apply to meetings that would otherwise be required to be held between 26 March 2020 and 30 September 2020. It also allows for companies to extend the period in which to hold an annual general meeting and an extension for the period in which public companies must file their financial statements.

=== Powers to change periods ===
Sections 41 and 42 gave powers to the Secretary for State to curtail the temporary time provisions which apply to parts of the act or to extend such periods for up to 6 months.

== Extension of certain provisions ==
=== Extensions made in September 2020 ===
The Corporate Insolvency and Governance Act 2020 (Coronavirus) (Extension of the Relevant Period) Regulations 2020 (SI 2020/1031) extended the following periods:

- In relation to the relaxations of AGM requirements, to 30 December 2020;
- In relation to the restrictions on use of statutory demands and winding up petitions, to 31 December 2020;
- In relation to modifications to the moratorium provisions and temporary moratorium clauses, to 30 March 2020; and
- In relation to the small supplier exemption from termination cause provisions, to 30 March 2021.

The statutory instrument was enacted by Lord Callanan for the Department for Business, Energy and Industrial Strategy.

The above extensions were subsequently modified by the Corporate Insolvency and Governance Act 2020 (Coronavirus) (Early Termination of Certain Temporary Provisions) Regulations 2020 (SI 2020/1033) in respect of the application of the moratorium provisions. These regulation provided that, from 1 October 2020, an insolvency practitioner would no longer be able to disregard the impact of Coronavirus on a company when considering whether the company is 'rescuable'.

=== Further extensions made in December 2020 ===
The Corporate Insolvency and Governance Act 2020 (Coronavirus) (Extension of the Relevant Period) (No. 2) Regulations 2020 (SI 2020/1483) was introduced to Parliament on 9 December 2020 and further extended the periods above in relation to winding up petitions and the use of statutory demands to 31 March 2021.

== Passage ==
The bill was introduced to the House of Commons by Alok Sharma, Secretary of State for Business, Energy and Industrial Strategy on 20 May 2020. Royal assent of the act was granted on 25 June 2020.

== See also ==
- UK insolvency law
- UK company law
- UK labour law
- Insolvency Act 1986
- Companies Act 2006
- COVID-19 pandemic in the United Kingdom
- COVID-19 recession
