= Corporation Tax Act 2009 =

Act of the Parliament of the United Kingdom

Corporation Tax Act 2009 (Note: Section 1330.)
- Act of Parliament
- Parliament of the United Kingdom
- Long title: An Act to restate, with minor changes, certain enactments relating to corporation tax; and for connected purposes.
- Citation: 2009 c. 4
- Introduced by: Alistair Darling (Commons); Lord Myners (Lords)
- Territorial extent: England and Wales; Scotland; Northern Ireland; (Note: Section 1328.)

Dates
- Royal assent: 26 March 2009
- Commencement: 1 April 2009 (Note: Section 1329.)
Other legislation
Amends	Inheritance Tax Act 1984; Airports Act 1986; British Steel Act 1988; Capital Allowances Act 2001; Railways Act 2005
Amended by	Statute Law (Repeals) Act 2013; Co-operative and Community Benefit Societies Act 2014; Finance Act 2015; Corporate Insolvency and Governance Act 2020; Finance Act 2026

Status: Amended

History of passage through Parliament

Text of statute as originally enacted

Revised text of statute as amended

The Corporation Tax Act 2009 (c. 4) is an act of the Parliament of the United Kingdom. It restated certain legislation relating to corporation tax, with minor changes that were mainly intended "to clarify existing provisions, make them consistent or bring the law into line with well established practice." The bill was the work of the Tax Law Rewrite Project team at HM Revenue and Customs.

== Provisions ==
The act consolidated legislation concerning corporation tax.

The act includes a tax relief scheme, which requires an intention to broadcast to television.

The act contains clauses enshrining reciprocity between corporation tax and employment tax.

== Commencement ==
Sections 1310, 1323, 1324, 1325(2) and (3) and 1328 to 1330 came into force on 26 March 2009.

The other provisions of the act came into force on 1 April 2009.

The amendments, repeals and revocations contained in schedules 1 and 3 have the same extent as the provisions they amend, repeal or revoke. The other provisions of the act extend to England and Wales, Scotland and Northern Ireland.
