= Income Tax Act 2007 =

Act of the Parliament of the United Kingdom

Income Tax Act 2007 (Note: Section 1035.)
- Act of Parliament
- Parliament of the United Kingdom
- Long title: An Act to restate, with minor changes, certain enactments relating to income tax; and for connected purposes.
- Citation: 2007 c. 3
- Introduced by: Kevin Brennan MP, Lord Commissioner of Her Majesty's Treasury (Commons); Lord Davies of Oldham (Lords)
- Territorial extent: England and Wales; Scotland; Northern Ireland; but an amendment, repeal or revocation contained in Schedule 1 or 3 has the same extent as the provision amended, repealed or revoked.; (Note: Section 1033.)

Dates
- Royal assent: 20 March 2007
- Commencement: 6 April 2007 (Note: Section 1034.)
Other legislation
Amends	Inheritance Tax Act 1984; Social Security Contributions and Benefits Act 1992; Social Security Contributions and Benefits (Northern Ireland) Act 1992; Jobseekers Act 1995; Limited Liability Partnerships Act 2000; Capital Allowances Act 2001; Constitutional Reform Act 2005; Income Tax (Trading and Other Income) Act 2005
Amended by	Charities Act 2011; Scotland Act 2012; Statute Law (Repeals) Act 2013; Co-operative and Community Benefit Societies Act 2014; Wales Act 2014; Finance Act 2015; Scotland Act 2016; Elections Act 2022; Employment Rights Act 2025; Finance Act 2026

Status: Amended

History of passage through Parliament

Text of statute as originally enacted

Revised text of statute as amended

The Income Tax Act 2007 (c. 3) is an act of the Parliament of the United Kingdom. It is the primary act of Parliament concerning income tax paid by individual earners subject to the law of United Kingdom, and mostly replaced the Income and Corporation Taxes Act 1988.

== Provisions ==
The act consolidated legislation concerning income tax.

The act enshrined the constitutional convention that income tax "is only charged for a year only if an act so provides”.

The act provides a clear definition of “permanent establishment”.

The act provides exemptions from income tax for charitable giving.

== See also ==
- Taxation in the United Kingdom
- UK labour law
