= Corporation Tax Act 2010 =

Act of the Parliament of the United Kingdom

Corporation Tax Act 2010 (Note: Section 1185.)
- Act of Parliament
- Parliament of the United Kingdom
- Long title: An Act to restate, with minor changes, certain enactments relating to corporation tax and certain enactments relating to company distributions; and for connected purposes.
- Citation: 2010 c. 4
- Introduced by: Alistair Darling (Chancellor of the Exchequer) (Commons); Lord Davies (Lords)
- Territorial extent: England and Wales; Scotland; Northern Ireland; (Note: Section 1183.)

Dates
- Royal assent: 3 March 2010
- Commencement: 1 April 2010 (Note: Section 1184.)
Other legislation
Amends	Inheritance Tax Act 1984; Income and Corporation Taxes Act 1988; Museums and Galleries Act 1992; Value Added Tax Act 1994; Petroleum Act 1998; Limited Liability Partnerships Act 2000; Capital Allowances Act 2001; Constitutional Reform Act 2005; Railways Act 2005; National Health Service (Consequential Provisions) Act 2006
Amended by	Savings Accounts and Health in Pregnancy Grant Act 2010; Statute Law (Repeals) Act 2013; Charities Act 2011; Co-operative and Community Benefit Societies Act 2014; Finance Act 2015; Wales Act 2017; Corporate Insolvency and Governance Act 2020; Non-Domestic Rating Act 2023; Finance Act 2026

Status: Amended

History of passage through Parliament

Text of statute as originally enacted

Revised text of statute as amended

The Corporation Tax Act 2010 (c. 4) is an act of the Parliament of the United Kingdom that received royal assent on 3 March 2010.

It was first presented (first reading) in the House of Commons on 19 November 2009 and received its third reading on 4 February 2010. It was first read in the House of Lords on 4 February 2010 and received its second and third readings on 2 March 2010.

== Provisions ==
Section 1 of the act gives a summary of the contents of the act, and the changes it made, primarily to the Income and Corporation Taxes Act 1988.

1 Overview of Act

(1) Part 2 is about calculation of the corporation tax chargeable on a company's profits, in particular—

(a) the rates at which corporation tax on profits is charged (see Chapter 2),
(b) ascertaining the amount of profits to which the rates of tax are applied (see Chapter 3), and
(c) the currency in which profits are to be calculated and expressed (see Chapter 4).

(2) Parts 3 to 7 make provision for the following reliefs—

(a) relief for companies with small profits (see Part 3),
(b) relief for trade losses (see Chapters 2 and 3 of Part 4),
(c) relief for losses from property businesses (see Chapter 4 of Part 4),
(d) relief for losses on a disposal of shares (see Chapter 5 of Part 4),
(e) relief for losses from miscellaneous transactions (see Chapter 6 of Part 4),
(f) group relief (see Part 5),
(g) relief for qualifying charitable donations (see Part 6), and
(h) community investment tax relief (see Part 7).

(3) Parts 8 to 13 make provision about special types of business and company etc, in particular—

(a) oil activities (see Part 8),
(b) leasing plant or machinery (see Part 9),
(c) close companies (see Part 10),
(d) charitable companies etc (see Part 11),
(e) real estate investment trusts (see Part 12),
(f) corporate beneficiaries under trusts (see Chapter 1 of Part 13),
(g) open-ended investment companies, authorised unit trusts and court investment funds (see Chapter 2 of Part 13),
(h) unauthorised unit trusts (see Chapter 3 of Part 13),
(i) securitisation companies (see Chapter 4 of Part 13),
(j) companies in liquidation or administration (see Chapter 5 of Part 13),
(k) banks etc in compulsory liquidation (see Chapter 6 of Part 13),
(l) co-operative housing associations and self-build societies (see Chapters 7 and 8 of Part 13), and
(m) community amateur sports clubs (see Chapter 9 of Part 13).

(4) Parts 14 to 21 contain provisions relating to tax avoidance, in particular with respect to—

(a) change in company ownership (see Part 14),
(b) transactions in securities (see Part 15),
(c) factoring of income (see Part 16),
(d) manufactured payments and repos (see Part 17),
(e) transactions in land (see Part 18),
(f) the sale and lease-back of assets (see Part 19),
(g) leasing plant or machinery (see Part 20), and
(h) other arrangements involving asset leasing (see Part 21).

(5) Part 22 contains miscellaneous provisions, including provision with respect to—

(a) transfers of trade without a change of ownership (see Chapter 1),
(b) transfers of trade to obtain balancing allowances (see Chapter 2),
(c) transfer of relief within partnerships (see Chapter 3),
(d) the surrender of tax refunds within groups of companies (see Chapter 4),
(e) the set off of income tax deductions against corporation tax (see Chapter 5),
(f) the assessment, collection and recovery of corporation tax from UK representatives of non-UK resident companies (see Chapter 6),
(g) the recovery of unpaid corporation tax due from non-UK resident companies (see Chapter 7), and
(h) exemptions (see Chapter 8).

(6) Part 23 contains provisions about the meaning of “distribution” and certain associated matters.

(7) Part 24 contains definitions that apply for the purposes of the Corporation Tax Acts and other general provisions that have effect for the purposes of those Acts.

(8) Part 25 contains provisions of general application, including definitions for the purposes of the Act.

(9) For abbreviations and defined expressions used in this Act, see section 1174 and Schedule 4.

The act consolidated legislation concerning corporation tax.

The act allows for the cash paid to shareholders to reaquire their shares to be treated as capital rather than income under certain conditions, which allows for this to be taxed as capital gains.

An individual is considered to be connected to a company if together with those connected to the individual, the individual controls the company.
