= Taxation of Chargeable Gains Act 1992 =

Act of the Parliament of the United Kingdom

Taxation of Chargeable Gains Act 1992 (Note: Section 291.)
- Act of Parliament
- Parliament of the United Kingdom
- Long title: An Act to consolidate certain enactments relating to the taxation of chargeable gains.
- Citation: 1992 c. 12
- Territorial extent: United Kingdom

Dates
- Royal assent: 6 March 1992
- Commencement: 6 April 1992 (Note: Section 289.)

Other legislation
- Amends: British Aerospace Act 1980; Airports Act 1986; British Steel Act 1988; See § Repealed enactments
- Repeals/revokes: See § Repealed enactments
- Amended by: Finance Act; Museums and Galleries Act 1992; Value Added Tax Act 1994; Petroleum Act 1998; Postal Services Act 2011; Co-operative and Community Benefit Societies Act 2014; Wales Act 2014; Finance Act 2015; Scotland Act 2016; Wales Act 2017; Corporate Insolvency and Governance Act 2020; Finance Act 2026

Status: Amended

Text of statute as originally enacted

Revised text of statute as amended

Text of the Taxation of Chargeable Gains Act 1992 as in force today (including any amendments) within the United Kingdom, from legislation.gov.uk.

The Taxation of Chargeable Gains Act 1992 (c. 12) is an act of the Parliament of the United Kingdom which governs the levying of capital gains tax in the United Kingdom. This is a tax on the increase in the value of an asset between the date of purchase and the date of sale of that asset. The tax operates under two different regimes for a natural person and a body corporate.

For a natural person, the rates of the capital gains tax are the same as those for earned income. The tax is levied at a rate determined by the highest rate of income tax which that person pays. Each year a natural person has an amount of gain, fixed by law, which is exempt from tax.

By contrast, for bodies corporate, the chargeable gain is treated as additional profits for the accounting period in question. The capital gains tax is charged as additional corporation tax. Bodies corporate have no allowance for gains free from tax.

Various reliefs from capital gains tax exist. These include indexation relief, where the amount of gain subject to tax is reduced by factoring in general price inflation, and taper relief, where set percentages of the gain are exempt from tax if the asset has been held for a certain length of time.

The act has been amended yearly by subsequent Finance Acts.

== Provisions ==
=== Repealed enactments ===
Section 290(3) of the act repealed 39 enactments and revoked 16 instruments, listed in schedule 12 to the act.

Acts
Citation	Short title	Extent of repeal
1968 c. 48	International Organisations Act 1968	In Schedule 1, paragraph 24(b).
1970 c. 10	Income and Corporation Taxes Act 1970	The whole act.
1970 c. 24	Finance Act 1970	Sections 27 and 28.
1970 c. 24	Finance Act 1970	Section 29(3), (5), (6), (7) and (9).
1970 c. 24	Finance Act 1970	Schedule 3.
1970 c. 24	Finance Act 1970	Schedule 6.
1971 c. 68	Finance Act 1971	Section 55.
1973 c. 51	Finance Act 1973	Section 38(1), (3) to (5) and (8).
1974 c. 30	Finance Act 1974	Section 29.
1974 c. 44	Housing Act 1974	Section 11.
1975 c. 45	Finance (No. 2) Act 1975	Section 47.
1975 c. 45	Finance (No. 2) Act 1975	Section 58.
1976 c. 40	Finance Act 1976	Section 54.
1976 c. 40	Finance Act 1976	In section 131(2) the words "and capital gains tax".
1977 c. 36	Finance Act 1977	Sections 41 and 42.
1979 c. 14	Capital Gains Tax Act 1979	The whole act.
1979 c. 47	Finance (No. 2) Act 1979	Section 17.
1980 c. 48	Finance Act 1980	Section 61(2).
1980 c. 48	Finance Act 1980	Sections 77 to 84.
1980 c. 48	Finance Act 1980	Section 117.
1980 c. 48	Finance Act 1980	Schedule 18.
1981 c. 35	Finance Act 1981	Section 38(3) and (4).
1981 c. 35	Finance Act 1981	Sections 79 to 91.
1981 c. 35	Finance Act 1981	In section 135 the words "capital gains tax and".
1982 c. 39	Finance Act 1982	Section 80.
1982 c. 39	Finance Act 1982	Sections 83 to 88.
1982 c. 39	Finance Act 1982	Section 148.
1982 c. 39	Finance Act 1982	Schedule 13.
1982 c. 53	Administration of Justice Act 1982	Section 46(2)(f).
1983 c. 20	Mental Health Act 1983	In Schedule 4 paragraph 49.
1983 c. 28	Finance Act 1983	Section 34.
1983 c. 28	Finance Act 1983	Schedule 6.
1983 c. 49	Finance (No. 2) Act 1983	Section 7.
1984 c. 32	London Regional Transport Act 1984	In Schedule 6 paragraphs 7 and 8.
1984 c. 43	Finance Act 1984	Section 44.
1984 c. 43	Finance Act 1984	Section 50.
1984 c. 43	Finance Act 1984	Section 56(3) and (4).
1984 c. 43	Finance Act 1984	Sections 63 to 71.
1984 c. 43	Finance Act 1984	Sections 79 to 81.
1984 c. 43	Finance Act 1984	In section 126(3)(b) the words "and capital gains tax".
1984 c. 43	Finance Act 1984	Schedules 11, 13 and 14.
1984 c. 51	Inheritance Tax Act 1984	In Schedule 8 paragraphs 9 to 12 and 23.
1985 c. 54	Finance Act 1985	Sections 67 to 72.
1985 c. 54	Finance Act 1985	Section 95(1)(b).
1985 c. 54	Finance Act 1985	Schedules 19 to 21.
1985 c. 71	Housing (Consequential Provisions) Act 1985	In Schedule 2 paragraph 18.
1986 c. 41	Finance Act 1986	Sections 58, 59 and 60.
1986 c. 56	Parliamentary Constituencies Act 1986	In Schedule 3 paragraph 6.
1987 c. 16	Finance Act 1987	Section 40.
1987 c. 16	Finance Act 1987	Section 68(3).
1987 c. 51	Finance (No. 2) Act 1987	Section 64.
1987 c. 51	Finance (No. 2) Act 1987	Section 73.
1987 c. 51	Finance (No. 2) Act 1987	Sections 79, 80 and 81.
1987 c. 51	Finance (No. 2) Act 1987	In Schedule 6, paragraphs 2, 4 and 5.
1988 c. 1	Income and Corporation Taxes Act 1988	Section 122(1)(b) (and the word "and" immediately preceding it), (3) and (8).
1988 c. 1	Income and Corporation Taxes Act 1988	Sections 345 to 347.
1988 c. 1	Income and Corporation Taxes Act 1988	Section 761(4).
1988 c. 1	Income and Corporation Taxes Act 1988	In Schedule 28, paragraph 8(4) and (5).
1988 c. 1	Income and Corporation Taxes Act 1988	In Schedule 29, paragraphs 10(4)(b), 12 and 15 to 28; in the Table in paragraph 32, the entries relating to the Income and Corporation Taxes Act 1970, the Finance Act 1970, the Finance (No. 2) Act 1975, the Capital Gains Tax Act 1979, Schedule 18 to the Finance Act 1980, sections 83 and 84 of the Finance Act 1981, Schedule 6 to the Finance Act 1983, section 50 of the Finance Act 1984, sections 68, 71 and 72 of, and Schedules 19 and 20 to, the Finance Act 1985 and section 58 of the Finance Act 1986.
1988 c. 39	Finance Act 1988	Sections 62 to 64.
1988 c. 39	Finance Act 1988	Sections 96 to 104.
1988 c. 39	Finance Act 1988	Section 105(1) to (5).
1988 c. 39	Finance Act 1988	Sections 106 to 116.
1988 c. 39	Finance Act 1988	Section 118.
1988 c. 39	Finance Act 1988	In Schedule 6, paragraph 6(5).
1988 c. 39	Finance Act 1988	Schedules 8 to 11.
1988 c. 39	Finance Act 1988	In Schedule 12, paragraphs 4, 5 and 7(b).
1988 c. 39	Finance Act 1988	In Schedule 13, paragraphs 16, 17 and 18.
1988 c. 48	Copyright, Designs and Patents Act 1988	In Schedule 7 paragraph 26.
1989 c. 26	Finance Act 1989	Section 91(2).
1989 c. 26	Finance Act 1989	Section 92(3) and in subsection (4) the words "the Capital Gains Tax Act 1979 or any other enactment relating to capital gains tax".
1989 c. 26	Finance Act 1989	Section 96(3).
1989 c. 26	Finance Act 1989	Section 122.
1989 c. 26	Finance Act 1989	Section 123(1)(a).
1989 c. 26	Finance Act 1989	Sections 124 to 141.
1989 c. 26	Finance Act 1989	Section 179(1)(a)(vi).
1989 c. 26	Finance Act 1989	In Schedule 12, paragraph 6.
1989 c. 26	Finance Act 1989	Schedules 14 and 15.
1989 c. 40	Companies Act 1989	In Schedule 18, paragraph 20.
1990 c. 1	Capital Allowances Act 1990	In Schedule 1, paragraphs 3 and 9(1) to (3).
1990 c. 29	Finance Act 1990	Section 28(3).
1990 c. 29	Finance Act 1990	Sections 31 to 40.
1990 c. 29	Finance Act 1990	Sections 46 and 47.
1990 c. 29	Finance Act 1990	Section 54.
1990 c. 29	Finance Act 1990	Sections 63 to 65.
1990 c. 29	Finance Act 1990	Section 70.
1990 c. 29	Finance Act 1990	Section 72.
1990 c. 29	Finance Act 1990	Section 81(3) and (6).
1990 c. 29	Finance Act 1990	Sections 83 to 86.
1990 c. 29	Finance Act 1990	Section 127(2).
1990 c. 29	Finance Act 1990	In Schedule 6, paragraph 10.
1990 c. 29	Finance Act 1990	Schedule 8.
1990 c. 29	Finance Act 1990	In Schedule 9, paragraphs 1 and 2.
1990 c. 29	Finance Act 1990	In Schedule 10, paragraphs 28 and 29(2) and (3).
1990 c. 29	Finance Act 1990	In Schedule 12, paragraph 2(2).
1990 c. 29	Finance Act 1990	In Schedule 14, paragraphs 17, 18 and 19(2), (3) and (4).
1990 c. 29	Finance Act 1990	In Schedule 18, paragraph 3.
1991 c. 21	Disability Living Allowance and Disability Working Allowance Act 1991	In Schedule 2 paragraph 9.
1991 c. 31	Finance Act 1991	Section 57(4).
1991 c. 31	Finance Act 1991	Section 67.
1991 c. 31	Finance Act 1991	Section 77(2).
1991 c. 31	Finance Act 1991	Section 78(2), (3), (6) and (7).
1991 c. 31	Finance Act 1991	Sections 83 to 102.
1991 c. 31	Finance Act 1991	In Schedule 6, paragraph 6.
1991 c. 31	Finance Act 1991	In Schedule 7, paragraphs 14 and 15.
1991 c. 31	Finance Act 1991	In Schedule 10, paragraphs 1 and 4.
1991 c. 31	Finance Act 1991	Schedules 16 to 18.
1991 c. 52	Ports Act 1991	Section 18(8)(a).
1992 c. 6	Social Security (Consequential Provisions) Act 1992	In Schedule 2, paragraph 51.

Statutory instruments
Citation	Title	Extent of revocation
SI 1979/1231	Capital Gains Tax (Gilt-edged Securities) (No. 1) Order 1979	The whole order.
SI 1979/1676	Capital Gains Tax (Gilt-edged Securities) (No. 2) Order 1979	The whole order.
SI 1980/507	Capital Gains Tax (Gilt-edged Securities) (No. 1) Order 1980	The whole order.
SI 1980/922	Capital Gains Tax (Gilt-edged Securities) (No. 2) Order 1980	The whole order.
SI 1980/1910	Capital Gains Tax (Gilt-edged Securities) (No. 3) Order 1980	The whole order.
SI 1981/615	Capital Gains Tax (Gilt-edged Securities) (No. 1) Order 1981	The whole order.
SI 1981/1879	Capital Gains Tax (Gilt-edged Securities) (No. 2) Order 1981	The whole order.
SI 1982/413	Capital Gains Tax (Gilt-edged Securities) (No. 1) Order 1982	The whole order.
SI 1982/1774	Capital Gains Tax (Gilt-edged Securities) (No. 2) Order 1982	The whole order.
SI 1983/1774	Capital Gains Tax (Gilt-edged Securities) Order 1983	The whole order.
SI 1984/1966	Capital Gains Tax (Gilt-edged Securities) Order 1984	The whole order.
SI 1986/12	Capital Gains Tax (Gilt-edged Securities) Order 1986	The whole order.
SI 1987/259	Capital Gains Tax (Gilt-edged Securities) Order 1987	The whole order.
SI 1988/360	Capital Gains Tax (Gilt-edged Securities) Order 1988	The whole order.
SI 1989/944	Capital Gains Tax (Gilt-edged Securities) Order 1989	The whole order.
SI 1991/2678	Capital Gains Tax (Gilt-edged Securities) Order 1991	The whole order.

== See also ==
- Income Tax Act 2007, regarding taxation of income, such as from work or dividends
- Corporation Tax Act 2010 (c 4), regarding taxation of corporations' income
- Value Added Tax Act 1994
