= Great Repeal Bill =

Great Repeal Bill may refer to two items of United Kingdom legislation:

- Great Repeal Bill (2008 proposal), Conservative proposal which fed into the Protection of Freedoms Act 2012
- European Union (Withdrawal) Act 2018, first proposed under the title "Great Repeal Bill" in 2016 by the May ministry as part of Brexit

== See also ==
- Great Reform Bill – the Reform Act 1832
- Statute Law (Repeals) Act, a stock short title used to repeal UK enactments since 1969
