= Policing and Crime Act =

Policing and Crime Act may refer to:

- Policing and Crime Act 2009
- Policing and Crime Act 2017

== See also ==
- Crime and Policing Act 2026
