= Samina Malik =

Samina Malik was the first person to be convicted under the UK's 2000 Terrorism Act. Malik, then a 23-year-old Heathrow Airport shop clerk from Southall, west London, was found guilty of "possessing a document or a record of information of a kind likely to be useful to a person committing or preparing an act of terrorism", but was earlier acquitted on the more serious charge of "possessing an article for terrorist purposes". Her conviction was later overturned on appeal.

== Identity and personality ==
The name "Lyrical Terrorist" is Samina Malik's on-line handle, which she used to post poems on extremist websites. Malik picked the name, she said "because it sounded cool". At various times she also called herself "Stranger Awaiting Martyrdom" and "Daughter of the Martyr". The last was a tribute to her grandmother who had died in 2002, Malik said. That year, while attending Villiers High School, she began writing, starting with love poems. Later she turned to poetry inspired by the rap of 50 Cent and Tupac Shakur, writing under the name "Lyrical Babe". In 2004 she became more religious, began wearing the hijab and changed her nom de plume to "Lyrical Terrorist". Although her defence counsel has compared her poems to the British poet Wilfred Owen, Malik herself has called her poetry "meaningless". She says that her words have been taken "too literally and out of context". She is also quoted as saying "I am not a terrorist", and blames her exposure to radical cleric Abu Hamza al-Masri on "the media's continuous spotlight and through his preaching, which the media continuously kept shedding light upon."

== Evidence ==
The documents in question include books on techniques of terrorism, firearms and heavy weapons, poisons, and hand-to-hand combat. Many of these books and manuals are written by and for extremist Islamic groups. A large number of poems and personal writings were also found, dealing with a wide range of subjects. In several poems, Malik expresses her admiration for the Mujahideen, her desire to be a martyr, her approval of beheadings, and her contempt for non-Muslims (whom she refers to as "kuffars"). Deputy Assistant Commissioner Peter Clarke, Head of the Metropolitan Police Counter-Terrorism Command, has said that Malik associated on-line with other extremists and has accused her of being involved with "terrorist-related" groups (including "Jihad Way", an organization that promotes al-Qaeda and other radical Islamist groups). He also contends that in the past she has tried to donate money to a terrorist organization.

Malik had been regularly in e-mail contact with a man named Sohail Qureshi. She advised him on the levels of security at Heathrow Airport, shortly before he travelled to Heathrow with the purpose of flying to Pakistan and then joining a terrorist group. This fact was kept from the jury during her trial, but it later emerged when she pleaded guilty to offences under the UK's 2000 and 2006 Terrorism Acts.

== Sentencing ==
Malik was held under house arrest prior to sentencing. The judge in this case, Peter Beaumont QC, has said that Malik is "in some respects, a complete enigma to me". He also warned that "all sentencing options" would be available on December 6, when the case was due to return to court. On 6 December, she was given a nine-month suspended jail sentence. She was the first woman to be convicted under the 2000 Terrorism Act.

On 17 June 2008, the Crown Prosecution Service decided not to seek a re-trial following a successful appeal.

== See also ==
- Rizwaan Sabir
