= Financial Services Act 2012 =

Act of the Parliament of the United Kingdom

Financial Services Act 2012 (Note: Section 123.)
- Act of Parliament
- Parliament of the United Kingdom
- Long title: An Act to amend the Bank of England Act 1998, the Financial Services and Markets Act 2000 and the Banking Act 2009; to make other provision about financial services and markets; to make provision about the exercise of certain statutory functions relating to building societies, friendly societies and other mutual societies; to amend section 785 of the Companies Act 2006; to make provision enabling the Director of Savings to provide services to other public bodies; and for connected purposes.
- Citation: 2012 c. 21
- Territorial extent: England and Wales; Scotland; Northern Ireland; (Note: Section 121.)

Dates
- Royal assent: 19 December 2012
- Commencement: 19 December 2012 (in part); 19 February 2012; Various; (Note: Section 122.)
Other legislation
Amends	Theft Act 1968; Employers' Liability (Compulsory Insurance) Act 1969; Solicitors Act 1974; House of Commons Disqualification Act 1975; Police Pensions Act 1976; Inheritance Tax Act 1984; Trustee Savings Banks Act 1985; Debtors (Scotland) Act 1987; Water Industry Act 1991; Social Security Administration Act 1992; Judicial Pensions and Retirement Act 1993; Value Added Tax Act 1994; Bank of England Act 1998; Water Resources Act 1991; Coal Industry Act 1994; Terrorism Act 2000; Financial Services and Markets Act 2000; Anti-terrorism, Crime and Security Act 2001; Constitutional Reform Act 2005; Tribunals, Courts and Enforcement Act 2007; Counter-Terrorism Act 2008; Dormant Bank and Building Society Accounts Act 2008; Terrorist Asset-Freezing etc. Act 2010; Postal Services Act 2011; Terrorism Prevention and Investigation Measures Act 2011; Charities Act 2011; Legal Aid, Sentencing and Punishment of Offenders Act 2012
Amended by	Sanctions and Anti-Money Laundering Act 2018; Employment Rights Act 2025

Status: Amended

Text of statute as originally enacted

Revised text of statute as amended

The Financial Services Act 2012 (c. 21) is an act of the Parliament of the United Kingdom which implements a new regulatory framework for the financial system and financial services in the UK. It replaces the Financial Services Authority with two new regulators, namely the Financial Conduct Authority and the Prudential Regulation Authority, and creates the Financial Policy Committee of the Bank of England. This framework went into effect on 1 April 2013.

Its main effect is to amend the Financial Services and Markets Act 2000.

== Provisions ==
Under the act, the administration of Libor became a regulated activity overseen by the Financial Conduct Authority. The act made consumer protection a core objective of the FCA. The act made the FCA responsible for regulating insider trading.

Knowingly or deliberately making false or misleading statements in relation to benchmark-setting became a criminal offence. Laws relating to charitable industrial and provident societies were revised.

== Reception ==
Donald Cruickshank criticised the legislation for, in his view, not dealing with the lack of competition in the sector.

== See also ==
- United Kingdom company law
- Law of the European Union
