= Counter-Terrorism and Border Security Act 2019 =

Act of the Parliament of the United Kingdom

Counter-Terrorism and Border Security Act 2019 (Note: Section 28.)
- Act of Parliament
- Parliament of the United Kingdom
- Long title: An Act to make provision in relation to terrorism; to make provision enabling persons at ports and borders to be questioned for national security and other related purposes; and for connected purposes.
- Citation: 2019 c. 3
- Introduced by: Sajid Javid (Commons); Baroness Williams of Trafford (Lords)
- Territorial extent: England and Wales; Scotland; Northern Ireland; (Note: Section 26.)

Dates
- Royal assent: 12 February 2019
- Commencement: Various (Note: Section 27.)
Other legislation
Amends	Bail Act 1976; Road Traffic Regulation Act 1984; Police and Criminal Evidence Act 1984; Legal Aid (Scotland) Act 1986; Reinsurance (Acts of Terrorism) Act 1993; Criminal Procedure (Scotland) Act 1995; Terrorism Act 2000; Postal Services Act 2000; Criminal Justice Act 2003; Domestic Violence, Crime and Victims Act 2004; Terrorism Act 2006; Serious Crime Act 2007; Counter-Terrorism Act 2008; Criminal Justice (Northern Ireland) Order 2008; Terrorism Prevention and Investigation Measures Act 2011; Protection of Freedoms Act 2012; Legal Aid, Sentencing and Punishment of Offenders Act 2012; Counter-Terrorism and Security Act 2015
Amended by	Sentencing (Pre-consolidation Amendments) Act 2020; Sentencing Act 2020]; Armed Forces Act 2021; National Security Act 2023; National Security Act 2023 (Consequential Amendments of Primary Legislation) Regulations 2023; Border Security, Asylum and Immigration Act 2025
Relates to	Immigration Act 1971

Status: Amended

History of passage through Parliament

Text of statute as originally enacted

Revised text of statute as amended

The Counter-Terrorism and Border Security Act 2019 (c. 3) is an act of the Parliament of the United Kingdom. It received royal assent on 12 February 2019 and came into force on 12 April 2019.

== Provisions ==
=== Part 1 Counter-Terrorism ===
Chapter 1: 'Terrorist Offences' makes provision for the amendment of and creation of new terrorist related offences under Section 12 of the Terrorism Act 2000.

Clause 1 makes it an offence to express an opinion or belief that is supportive of a proscribed organisation in circumstances where the perpetrator is reckless as to whether a person to whom the expression is directed will be encouraged to support a proscribed organisation.

Clause 2 amends section 13 of the Terrorism Act 2000, making it an offence to publish images of: items of clothing or any other article (such as a flag) which would arouse suspicions that the person is a member or supporter of a proscribed organisation.

Under section 58 of the Terrorism Act 2000, it is already an offence to download information that is "likely to be useful to a person committing or preparing an act of terrorism." Clause 3 amends this to include streaming of such material, where it is not stored offline.

Section (4) further amends section 58 (3) of the 2000 act by adding that it is a reasonable excuse to collect such material if they did not realise the document or record was likely to contain information likely to be used by a person committing or preparing an act of terrorism, or whether the possession was for the purposes of journalism or academic research.

== Justification ==
The act was proposed to address activities of "hostile states". According to the Home Office, "After the spate of terrorist attacks of last year and the deadly nerve agent attack in Salisbury, our intelligence services and police made the case for an update of existing legislation and some new powers to help meet their operational needs and respond to the evolving threats posed by terrorism and hostile state activity."

Home Secretary Sajid Javid said, "This important piece of legislation will allow the police and MI5 to disrupt threats earlier, and ensure our laws reflect modern use of the internet. It will change existing laws to better manage terrorist offenders and permit more effective investigations."

== See also ==
- Terrorism Act 2000
- Counter-Terrorism Act 2008
- Counter-Terrorism and Security Act 2015
