= Crime and Security Act 2010 =

Act of the Parliament of the United Kingdom

Crime and Security Act 2010 (Note: Section 60.)
- Act of Parliament
- Parliament of the United Kingdom
- Long title: An Act to make provision about police powers of stop and search; about the taking, retention, destruction and use of evidential material; for the protection of victims of domestic violence; about injunctions in respect of gang-related violence; about anti-social behaviour orders; about the private security industry; about possession and use of electronic communications devices in prison; about air weapons; for the compensation of victims of overseas terrorism; about licensing the sale and supply of alcohol; about searches in relation to persons subject to control orders; and for connected purposes.
- Citation: 2010 c. 17
- Introduced by: Alan Johnson, Secretary of State for the Home Department (Commons); Lord West of Spithead, Parliamentary Under-Secretary (Home Office) (Security and Counter-terrorism) (Lords)
- Territorial extent: England and Wales; Scotland; Northern Ireland; (Note: Section 58.)

Dates
- Royal assent: 8 April 2010
- Commencement: Various (Note: Section 59.)
Other legislation
Amends	Prison Act 1952; Firearms Act 1968; Inheritance Tax Act 1984; Police and Criminal Evidence Act 1984; Police and Criminal Evidence (Northern Ireland) Order 1989; Crime and Disorder Act 1998; Terrorism Act 2000; Private Security Industry Act 2001; Police Reform Act 2002; Prevention of Terrorism Act 2005; Tribunals, Courts and Enforcement Act 2007; Counter-Terrorism Act 2008; Policing and Crime Act 2009
Amended by	Terrorism Prevention and Investigation Measures Act 2011; Protection of Freedoms Act 2012; Northern Ireland Act 1998 (Devolution of Policing and Justice Functions) Order 2012; Crime and Courts Act 2013; Anti-social Behaviour, Crime and Policing Act 2014; Serious Crime Act 2015; Policing and Crime Act 2017; Domestic Abuse Act 2021

Status: Amended

History of passage through Parliament

Text of statute as originally enacted

Revised text of statute as amended

The Crime and Security Act 2010 (c. 17) is an act of the Parliament of the United Kingdom that introduced various measures relating to policing, crime and security; primarily regarding domestic violence, gang violence, anti-social behaviour, and requirements relating to the collection of forensic evidence from and the stop and search of individuals.

== Provisions ==
=== Domestic violence ===
In England and Wales, the act introduces Domestic Violence Protection Notices, which may be issued by a police officer of at least the rank of Superintendent where they have reasonable grounds to believe that an individual has used or threatened violence against a family member and the issuance of a DVPN is necessary to protect that person by requiring the perpetrator to, where applicable, vacate the premises of and not to contact the victim, and Domestic Violence Protection Orders, made by a magistrates' court following issuance of a DVPN.

=== Forensic samples ===
The act followed the ruling in S and Marper v United Kingdom by the European Court of Human Rights which stated that holding the DNA samples of those who have been arrested for an offence but later acquitted or not charged is a violation of their Article 8 right to privacy. The act creates a statutory framework for the retention and destruction of biometric data records created during the investigation of offences, as well as expanding the powers of police to take fingerprint and DNA samples.

The act allows for the police to take samples from individuals previously convicted of serious crimes.

=== Prisons ===
The act updates the Prison Act 1952 by criminalising the possession of unathorised mobile phones and other telecommunication devices within prisons.

=== Stop and search ===
Section 1 reduced the details that police were required to record and report on following stopping and searching a suspect in England and Wales.

The act allows police services to only require their officers to record "stop and account" encounters if there is a full search.

== Reception ==
The National DNA Database Ethics Group called for greater transparency in how the national DNA database was administered than had been committed to in August 2010.
