= Richard Medhurst =

British commentator (born 1992)

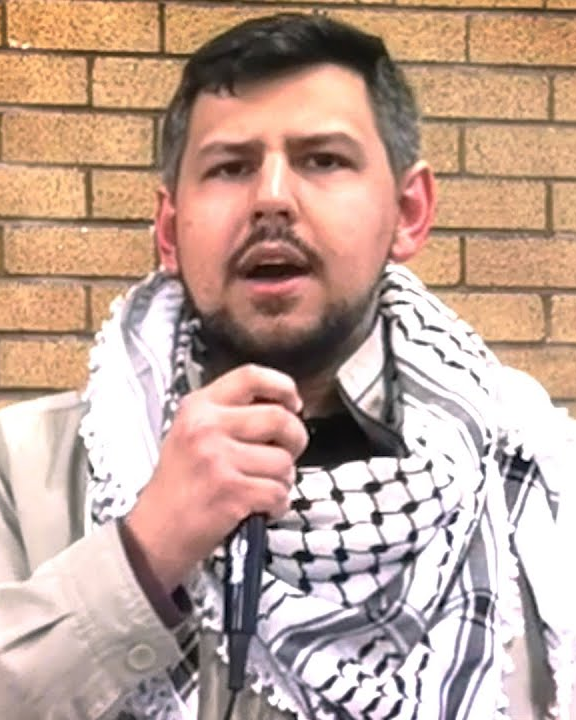
- Medhurst speaking on Israeli action in the Gaza Strip in June 2024
- Born: Richard Thomas Medhurst; 20 August 1992 (age 34); Damascus, Syria
- Occupations: Independent journalist; activist; YouTuber; Political commentator

YouTube information
- Channel: Richard Medhurst
- Years active: 2006–present
- Subscribers: 411 thousand
- Views: 62 million
- Last updated: 24 October 2026

Richard Thomas Medhurst (born 20 August 1992) is a British activist, independent journalist and left-wing political commentator. Commenting largely on the Middle East, Medhurst was "the first reporter arrested and under investigation under Section 12 of the Terrorism Act 2000".

== Early life and education ==
Richard Medhurst was born in Damascus, Syria, on 20 August 1992 to a Syrian mother and a British father. Both of his parents served as United Nations Peacekeepers, partaking in missions in Angola, Lebanon, Syria, India, and Kashmir. His father, Paul Medhurst, is a doctor of political science, and a retired professor who formerly taught at American Military University. He has stated that due to his parents' work, he was moved around often and that his entire secondary school education was completed in French.

== Career ==
Medhurst has a YouTube channel which, among other things, focuses on foreign affairs and the Israel-Hamas conflict. His channel has more than 300,000 followers. Medhurst has said he has been demonetised on two different occasions, once in July 2020 with the website citing reused content and again in October 2023 in the early stages of the Gaza war for claimed non-compliance with the site's Partner Programme Policies. In both instances, Medhurst denounced YouTube's actions, claiming discrimination and the unjust theft of his primary source of income based on his unfavourable coverage of Israel. Following his second demonetisation, Medhurst moved much of his coverage to Rumble, remaining on YouTube only to discuss topics he is not concerned will garner retaliation from the platform.

Outside of YouTube, Medhurst writes for Al Mayadeen, Press TV, and RT. He has written for The New Arab and appeared on Al Jazeera, and FOX News From 2020 to 2022, Medhurst hosted his own show The Communiqué with Richard Medhurst on PressTV.

Medhurst has regularly visited Iran. He attended the May 2024 funeral of President Ebrahim Raisi, who died in a helicopter crash. He initially said Vladimir Putin attended the funeral but later retracted the claim.

=== Arrests ===
On 15 August 2024, Medhurst was arrested at Heathrow Airport in London, United Kingdom, under the Section 12 of the U.K's Terrorism Act 2000 due to an accusation that he had "express[ed] an opinion or a belief that is supportive of a proscribed organisation". Medhurst said he was removed from a plane by five plainclothes officers and one wearing tactical gear before being moved to a police station for interrogation. He said he was not allowed to contact his family during his incarceration. Medhurst said of the incident, "I reject what the police said about me and their claims. I’m not engaged in terrorism". Medhurst's arrest was condemned by the National Union of Journalists and the International Federation of Journalists in a joint-statement, with the organisations remarking, “Richard Medhurst’s arrest and detention for almost 24 hours using terrorism legislation is deeply concerning and will likely have a chilling effect on journalists in the UK and worldwide, in fear of arrest by UK authorities simply for carrying out their work.” Craig Murray criticised the "persecution of journalists as 'terrorists' ".

Medhurst was arrested again on 3 February 2025, this time by Austrian authorities who raided his home and accused him of affiliations with Hamas. His studio was searched extensively and his electronic devices were seized. The NUJ and IFJ again sharply criticised his arrest, with the NUJ saying, "The latest investigation into Richard Medhurst will no doubt leave journalists worried about approaches being adopted by international governments. We need greater transparency from both the British and Austrian police and call once more, for the proportionate use of police powers. No journalist at home or abroad should fear detention or their ability to protect sources simply for carrying out their duties." The IFJ stated that, “The arrest of Richard Medhurst in Austria is an alarming and unacceptable attack on press freedom. This detention not only violates Medhurst's fundamental rights as a journalist but also undermines the core principles of democracy. We stand in unwavering solidarity with Richard and all journalists who face persecution for doing their job."

== Views ==
The International Federation of Journalists described Medhurst as pro-Palestine. He has criticised Israel's actions in the Gaza war and stated that anyone speaking up and reporting about the situation in Gaza was being targeted.

The Times of Israel described him as "anti-Israel". That newspaper and Jewish News said that “has voiced support for Hamas“ during the Gaza war and has “spread conspiracy theories” about the October 7 attacks, including by denying any sexual and gender-based violence during them, and “asserting that the victims of the massacre were killed by the IDF, not by Hamas.”

The Times of Israel, Fathom Journal and the think tank Foundation for Defense of Democracies have accused him of antisemitism, the Times saying he “regularly casts doubt on the connection between Jews and the Land of Israel by means of racist innuendo about Ashkenazi surnames and misleading claims about modern Hebrew” and Fathom attributing various antisemitic conspiracy theories to him. He has described Israeli claims about antisemitism as “bogus”.

Jewish News described him as “pro-Iran”. During April 2024 Iranian strikes on Israel, he posted a selfie in front of Iranian missiles calling Iran the “anti-imperialist and anti-Zionist capital of the world”, adding ”Long live the resistance.”

He has been described by critics - such as the journalist Paul Mason, the Trotskyist group Alliance for Workers' Liberty, the Rand Corporation, and the Polish anti-disinformation website fakenews.pl - as pro-Russian and pro-Assad. He criticized Rashida Tlaib for condemning Bashar al-Assad's actions in the Syrian civil war, and "welcomed" the official Syrian government statement that Assad had won the 2021 Syrian presidential election, which was considered illegitimate by the international community.

Medhurst is a Syrian Christian. He is a staunch critic of the Israeli government as well as the pro-Israel lobby in the U.K and in the U.S, stating that Zionism was antithetical to true Christianity.

Throughout his career, Medhurst has criticised western policy towards Syria. In the wake of the 2024 fall of the Assad regime, he said that the new government under Ahmed al-Sharaa is subservient to the interests of Israel and al-Qaeda.

Medhurst has advocated for the implementation of progressive economic policies such as universal healthcare in the U.S.
