= Legal Aid, Sentencing and Punishment of Offenders Act 2012 =

Act of the Parliament of the United Kingdom

Legal Aid, Sentencing and Punishment of Offenders Act 2012 (Note: Section 154.)
- Act of Parliament
- Parliament of the United Kingdom
- Long title: An Act to make provision about legal aid; to make further provision about funding legal services; to make provision about costs and other amounts awarded in civil and criminal proceedings; to make provision about referral fees in connection with the provision of legal services; to make provision about sentencing offenders, including provision about release on licence or otherwise; to make provision about the collection of fines and other sums; to make provision about bail and about remand otherwise than on bail; to make provision about the employment, payment and transfer of persons detained in prisons and other institutions; to make provision about penalty notices for disorderly behaviour and cautions; to make provision about the rehabilitation of offenders; to create new offences of threatening with a weapon in public or on school premises and of causing serious injury by dangerous driving; to create a new offence relating to squatting; to increase penalties for offences relating to scrap metal dealing and to create a new offence relating to payment for scrap metal; and to amend section 76 of the Criminal Justice and Immigration Act 2008.
- Citation: 2012 c. 10
- Introduced by: Kenneth Clarke (Commons)
- Territorial extent: England and Wales; Scotland; Northern Ireland; (Note: Section 152.)

Dates
- Royal assent: 1 May 2012
- Commencement: Various (Note: Section 151.)
Other legislation
Amends	Prevention of Crime Act 1953; Scrap Metal Dealers Act 1964; Courts-Martial (Appeals) Act 1968; Immigration Act 1971; Criminal Justice Act 1972; Solicitors Act 1974; House of Commons Disqualification Act 1975; Bail Act 1976; Criminal Law Act 1977; Magistrates' Courts Act 1980; Senior Courts Act 1981; Armed Forces Act 1981; Child Abduction Act 1984; Criminal Justice Act 1988; Legal Aid Act 1988; Football Spectators Act 1989; Courts and Legal Services Act 1990; Social Security Administration Act 1992; Jobseekers Act 1995; Goods Vehicles (Licensing of Operators) Act 1995; Youth Justice and Criminal Evidence Act 1999; Terrorism Act 2000; International Criminal Court Act 2001; Anti-terrorism, Crime and Security Act 2001; Crime (International Co-operation) Act 2003; Domestic Violence, Crime and Victims Act 2004; Constitutional Reform Act 2005; Mental Capacity Act 2005; Equality Act 2006; Criminal Defence Service Act 2006; Violent Crime Reduction Act 2006; Tribunals, Courts and Enforcement Act 2007; Legal Services Act 2007; Criminal Justice and Immigration Act 2008; Human Fertilisation and Embryology Act 2008; Children and Young Persons Act 2008; Counter-Terrorism Act 2008; Terrorist Asset-Freezing etc. Act 2010; Terrorism Prevention and Investigation Measures Act 2011
Repeals/revokes	Criminal Defence Service (Advice and Assistance) Act 2001
Amended by	Financial Services Act 2012; Scrap Metal Dealers Act 2013; Crime and Courts Act 2013; Public Service Pensions Act 2013; Legal Aid, Sentencing and Punishment of Offenders Act 2012 (Amendment of Schedule 1) Order 2013; Children and Families Act 2014; Housing (Wales) Act 2014; Legal Aid and Coroners' Courts Act (Northern Ireland) 2014; Anti-social Behaviour, Crime and Policing Act 2014; Immigration Act 2014; Crime and Courts Act 2013 (Family Court: Consequential Provision) Order 2014; Legal Aid, Sentencing and Punishment of Offenders Act 2012 (Amendment of Schedule 1) (Advocacy Exceptions) Order 2014; Criminal Justice and Courts Act 2015; Counter-Terrorism and Security Act 2015; Serious Crime Act 2015; Modern Slavery Act 2015; Road Safety Act 2006 (Consequential Amendments) Order 2015; Care Act 2014 and Children and Families Act 2014 (Consequential Amendments) Order 2015; Immigration Act 2016; Modern Slavery Act 2015 (Consequential Amendments) Regulations 2016; Social Services and Well-being (Wales) Act 2014 (Consequential Amendments) Regulations 2016; Policing and Crime Act 2017; Immigration Act 2016 (Consequential Amendments) (Biometrics and Legal Aid) Regulations 2017; Additional Learning Needs and Education Tribunal (Wales) Act 2018; Sanctions and Anti-Money Laundering Act 2018; Regulation and Inspection of Social Care (Wales) Act 2016 (Consequential Amendments) Regulations 2018; Financial Services and Markets Act 2000 (Claims Management Activity) Order 2018; Human Fertilisation and Embryology Act 2008 (Remedial) Order 2018; Counter-Terrorism and Border Security Act 2019; Civil Legal Aid (Amendment) (EU Exit) Regulations 2019; Jurisdiction and Judgments (Family) (Amendment etc.) (EU Exit) Regulations 2019; Immigration, Nationality and Asylum (EU Exit) Regulations 2019; Legal Aid, Sentencing and Punishment of Offenders Act 2012 (Legal Aid for Separated Children) (Miscellaneous Amendments) Order 2019; Terrorist Offenders (Restriction of Early Release) Act 2020; Sentencing Act 2020; Counter-Terrorism and Sentencing Act 2021; Police, Crime, Sentencing and Courts Act 2022; Nationality and Borders Act 2022; Criminal Justice Act 2003 (Commencement No. 33) and Sentencing Act 2020 (Commencement No. 2) Regulations 2022; National Security Act 2023; Illegal Migration Act 2023; Civil Legal Aid (Housing and Asylum Accommodation) Order 2023; Judicial Review and Courts Act 2022 (Magistrates' Court Sentencing Powers) Regulations 2023; Legal Aid, Sentencing and Punishment of Offenders Act 2012 (Legal Aid: Family and Domestic Abuse) (Miscellaneous Amendments) Order 2023; Retained EU Law (Revocation and Reform) Act 2023 (Consequential Amendment) Regulations 2023; Victims and Prisoners Act 2024; Legal Aid, Sentencing and Punishment of Offenders Act 2012 (Legal Aid: Domestic Abuse) (Amendment) Order 2024; Legal Aid, Sentencing and Punishment of Offenders Act 2012 (Legal Aid: Domestic Abuse) (Miscellaneous Amendments) Order 2025; Sentencing Act 2026

Status: Amended

History of passage through Parliament

Text of statute as originally enacted

Revised text of statute as amended

The Legal Aid, Sentencing and Punishment of Offenders Act 2012 (c. 10) (LASPO) is an act of the Parliament of the United Kingdom enacted by the coalition government of 2010-2015, creating reforms to the justice system. The bill for the act was introduced in the House of Commons on 21 June 2011, and received Royal Assent on 1 May 2012.

== Measures ==
Among other measures, the act:

- Gives courts greater discretion to issue conditional discharges for young persons pleading guilty to a first offence.
- The objectives of the act included making significant savings in the cost of the scheme, discouraging unnecessary and adversarial litigation at public expense, and targeting legal aid to those who need it the most.
- Creates a "single remand framework" for the use of secure remand for children and young people; transfers the cost of remand arrangements to local authorities; creates new conditions that must be met before a child or young person is remanded into custody.
- Expands Youth Rehabilitation Orders (YROs) to allow longer curfew hours, single duration extensions of six months; increases the maximum fines for breaches; and allows courts to order a period of supervision instead of custody following a breach.
- Abolishes the Legal Services Commission, a non-departmental public body, and replaces it with the Legal Aid Agency, a new executive agency of the Ministry of Justice.
- Part 1 of the act - removes financial support for most cases involving housing, welfare, medical negligence, employment, debt and immigration.
- Part 1 of the act - removes financial support for most private family law cases, other than in situations involving domestic abuse allegations, where a child who is the subject of the proceedings is at the risk of 'harm' from another party.

In Part 3 of the act, concerned with sentencing and punishment of offenders:

- Chapter 1 brings the sentencing starting point for murders motivated by hate on the grounds of disability or transgender to 30 years, falling into line with other types of hate crime, and removes the maximum fine on certain offences dealt with by Magistrates Courts, including fines for health and safety offences, so that fines may now be unlimited ("a fine of any amount").
- Chapter 6 modifies the Crime (Sentences) Act 1997 to allow the Secretary of State to deport foreign nationals serving indeterminate prison sentences, once they have served the minimum term.
- Chapter 9 creates a new offence of squatting in a residential building, with a maximum punishment of 51 weeks' imprisonment, a fine not exceeding level 5 of the standard scale (£5,000), or both; and amends the Police and Criminal Evidence Act 1984 to allow the police to enter and search such a building if they suspect someone to be squatting in it.

== Development ==
The creation of a new offence for squatting was proposed by Mike Weatherley, Member of Parliament (MP) for Hove in East Sussex, who had been campaigning against squatting since being elected to Parliament in 2010. In a consultation held in 2011, the government raised the option of criminalising squatting in commercial (non-residential) properties. Following responses to the consultation indicating a lower level of concern over such squatting, it indicated that it had no current plans to extend the definition of the offence.

At the time, polling indicated the public were largely in favour of criminalising squatting, with a YouGov poll finding eight out of ten people agreed with the change.

Crispin Blunt, Parliamentary Under-Secretary of State for Prisons and Youth Justice within the Ministry of Justice at the time, justified the changes to the law, saying:

"I accept that the law already provides a degree of protection for both commercial and residential property owners as offences such as criminal damage and burglary may apply in certain circumstances. There is also an offence under section 7 of the Criminal Law Act 1977 that applies where a trespasser fails to leave residential premises on being required to do so by or on behalf of a 'displaced residential occupier' or a 'protected intending occupier'. This offence means that people who have effectively been made homeless as a result of occupation of their properties by squatters can already call the police to report an offence. But there are many residential property owners, including landlords, local authorities and second home owners, who cannot be classified as 'displaced residential occupiers' or 'protected intending occupiers'."

== Effects and criticism ==
=== Squatting ===
Section 144 of LASPO, creating the new offence of squatting in a residential property, came into force on 1 September 2012. A 'residential property' is defined as one "designed or adapted, before the time of entry, for use as a place to live". The first person to be imprisoned for the new offence was Alex Haight, a 21-year-old bricklayer from Plymouth who had come to London looking for work and squatted a council flat. On 27 September 2012 he was sentenced to 12 weeks in prison.

Rules regarding squatting commercial properties remained as layout in Section 6 of the Criminal Law Act 1977.

The act was criticised by the charities Crisis and The Big Issue Foundation as criminalising the homeless, possibly causing a sharp rise in homelessness, and benefitting landlords that leave their buildings empty. Several campaign groups protested the law at locations around the UK in 2011. On 23 February 2013, Daniel Gauntlett, a homeless man, was warned by Kent police not to shelter in a boarded up empty bungalow that was due for demolition. An inquest on 27 February found that his subsequent death sleeping on its doorstep was caused by hypothermia. In March 2012, the campaign group Squatters' Action for Secure Homes (SQUASH) published a report claiming that the cost of implementing the squatting law reforms over the next five years would reach £790m, some five times the official estimate.

In August 2013 Mike Weatherley wrote to the Prime Minister in support of an extension of the law to cover commercial properties, following 24 MPs putting their signature to an Early Day Motion in January 2013 calling for the law's extension.

=== Legal aid ===
In August 2011 the Law Centres Federation and London Legal Support Trust warned that a third of the 56 law centres in the United Kingdom would be forced to close as a result of the cuts to legal aid. Furthermore, 27 legal aid providers have collapsed since April 2020, which is more than 70 officers. In May 2012 the Labour peer Lord Bach, former Parliamentary Under-Secretary of State in the Ministry of Justice and current shadow spokesman on legal aid, condemned the legislation as "a rotten bill [that] demeans our justice system and therefore our country. [It takes] away from the poor their access to justice." Andy Slaughter, the shadow Justice Minister, described the legislation as "cynical" and "cover[ing] up mistakes made". The Ministry of Justice defended the legislation, stating that it would keep legal aid "where legal help is most needed, where people's life or liberty is at stake or they are at risk of serious physical harm, face immediate loss of their home or their children may be taken into care, [while] reducing the £2.1bn per year legal aid bill for England and Wales."

Transitional arrangements for the treatment of existing legal aid cases were established in 2013 by the Legal Aid, Sentencing and Punishment of Offenders Act 2012 (Consequential, Transitional and Saving Provisions) Regulations 2013, which also made consequential amendments to secondary legislation.

LASPO has also affected legal aid providers. In January 2014, thousands of criminal case lawyers across the country participated in a protest, by not participating in cases and staging a number of walkouts, against planned cuts to legal aid. The protest, organised by the Criminal Bar Association, was the first in the history of the criminal bar in the UK. This was largely because criminal legal aid barristers get paid a medial net annual income of £27,000, which is less than the starting salary for a graduate manager at Aldi, who will work less hours than a barrister. There have also been many job losses for lawyers due to a decline in the number of firms offering legal aid. Furthermore, legal aid firms do not profit from money coming in from the Legal Aid Agency, and instead must use the money to pay staff and business costs etc. Some barristers also feel that their role has been "driven to extinction."

This has worsened during the pandemic, as the Law Society of England and Wales has confirmed that there are problems for legal aid providers with working remotely, something the society is pushing for further guidance from the Legal Aid Agency about. The Law Society also believe there should be fairer pay awarded to criminal legal aid providers. LASPO has also meant longer hours and an increase in paperwork for legal aid lawyers, particularly solicitors. The continued problems resulted in yet another protest by barristers in 2022.

== Citations ==
- "Lawyers protesting outside courts over legal aid cuts". BBC News. 6 January 2014.
- Boycott, Owen (2 May 2012a). "Labour peer condemns legal aid cuts". The Guardian.
- Boycott, Owen (31 August 2012b). "Charities fear end of 'squatters' rights' could lead to big rise in homelessness". The Guardian.
- Boycott, Owen (27 September 2012c). "First squatter jailed under new law". The Guardian.
- Campbell, Krista (2011). "'Criminalise squatting'". YouGov.
- Hunter, Chris (28 February 2013). "Homeless man Daniel Gauntlett dies frozen on doorstep of empty bungalow in Aylesford". Kent Online.
- Hern, Alex (4 March 2013). "Death of homeless man blamed on anti-squatting laws". New Statesman.
- "Early day motion 912: Commercial Squatting". House of Commons.
- Lithman, Nigel (3 January 2014). "CBA Chairman's Message: The 6th January 2014 update". Criminal Bar Association.
- Malik, Shiv (15 September 2011). "Squatting protests – as they happened". The Guardian.
- Malik, Shiv (16 March 2012). "Squatting law reforms 'could cost taxpayers £790m over five years'". The Guardian.
- "Consultation on options for dealing with squatters". Ministry of Justice. 13 June 2011a.
- "Options for dealing with squatting: Response to consultation carried out by the Ministry of Justice" (PDF). Ministry of Justice. 26 October 2011b.
- "LASPO background information". Ministry of Justice. 17 October 2012c.
- "Royal Assent for Legal Aid, Sentencing and Punishment of Offenders Bill". Ministry of Justice. 1 May 2012a.
- "Legal Aid, Sentencing and Punishment of Offenders Act 2012". Ministry of Justice. 14 May 2012b.
- "Explanatory memorandum to the Legal Aid, Sentencing and Punishment of Offenders Act 2012 (Consequential, Transitional and Saving Provisions) Regulations 2013" (PDF). Ministry of Justice. 2013.
- Rayner, Jonathan; Baksi, Catherine (4 August 2011). "One in three law centres set to shut down". Law Society Gazette. Archived from the original on 3 January 2012.
- "Legal Aid, Sentencing and Punishment of Offenders Act 2012, Section 144: Offence of squatting in a residential building". UK Statute Law Database. 1 May 2012.
- "Legal Aid, Sentencing and Punishment of Offenders Act 2012, Section 154: Short title". UK Statute Law Database. 1 May 2012.
- "The Legal Aid, Sentencing and Punishment of Offenders Act 2012 (Commencement No. 1) Order 2012". UK Statute Law Database. 24 July 2012.
- Walker, Peter (24 June 2011). "Criminalising squatting will hit homeless, charities warn". The Guardian.
- Weatherley, Mike (26 October 2011). "Squatting Criminalised by MP Weatherley". Mike Weatherley. Archived from the original on 3 January 2013.
- Weatherley, Mike (8 May 2013). "Mike Launches National Commercial Squatting Fightback with Letter to Downing Street". Mike Weatherley. Archived from the original on 14 December 2013.
- "How the act affects youth justice". Youth Justice Board. 14 March 2013.
