= Crime and Policing Act 2026 =

Act of the Parliament of the United Kingdom

Crime and Policing Act 2026 (Note: Section 257.)
- Act of Parliament
- Parliament of the United Kingdom
- Long title: An Act to make provision about anti-social behaviour, offensive weapons, offences against people (including sexual offences), property offences, the criminal exploitation of persons, sex offenders, stalking and public order; to make provision about powers of the police, the border force and other similar persons; to make provision about confiscation; to make provision about the police; to make provision about terrorism and national security, and about international agreements relating to crime; to make provision about the criminal liability of bodies; and for connected purposes.
- Citation: 2026 c.20
- Territorial extent: England and Wales; Scotland (in part); Northern Ireland (in part)

Dates
- Royal assent: 29 April 2026
- Commencement: Various (Note: Section 255.)
Other legislation
Amends	Offences Against the Person Act 1861; Bail Act 1976; Customs and Excise Management Act 1979; Magistrates' Courts Act 1980; Limitation Act 1980; Criminal Justice Act 1988; Criminal Procedure (Scotland) Act 1995; Police Act 1996; Terrorism Act 2000; Constitutional Reform Act 2005; Tribunals, Courts and Enforcement Act 2007; Counter-Terrorism Act 2008; Terrorism Prevention and Investigation Measures Act 2011; National Security Act 2023

Status: Current legislation

Text of statute as originally enacted

The Crime and Policing Act 2026 is an act of the Parliament of the United Kingdom. The act received royal assent on 29 April 2026.

== Provisions ==
Part 1 contains provisions related to anti-social behaviour, specifically introducing "respect orders", a modernised form of anti-social behaviour order (ASBO). It also provisions intended to combat flytipping, and a new criminal offence of trespass with intent to commit a criminal offence.

Part 2 concerns offensive weapons, including restrictions on the advertising of unlawful weapons online, and introduces civil penalties for online platforms that fail to remove such content. This has been campaigned for under the name "Ronan's Law", named after Ronan Kanda, a 16-year-old boy who was stabbed in Wolverhampton using weapons purchased online. This was also a recommendation in the 2025 review by the National Police Chiefs' Council.

In addition, Part 2 introduces a new offence of possessing a weapon with intent to use unlawful violence, and increases the maximum penalty for offences that are relating to offensive weapons.

Part 3 concerns retail crime, and makes a new criminal offence of assaulting a retail worker. Section 47 repeals section 22A of the Magistrates' Courts Act 1980, a provision which had been added by the Anti-social Behaviour, Crime and Policing Act 2014. This section made low-value retail shoplifting (under £200) triable only summarily rather than triable either way. This change was justified as a response to concerns by shopkeepers and workers that police treat shoplifting with low priority, and the belief among some offenders that shoplifting below the £200 limit was not prosecuted.

Part 4 seeks to deal with criminal exploitation of children, such as by county lines drug trafficking gangs. It makes a new offence of causing or facilitating a child to commit criminal offences, as well as a new order that police can seek to try and prevent child criminal exploitation. Cuckooing, the control of another person's home for criminal purposes, is also made an offence, as is causing internal concealment by another of an item used for criminal purposes. (In the context of drug trafficking, these are often drugs, money or SIM cards.)

Part 5 concerns sexual offences and abuse:

- Chapter 1 makes it a criminal offence (in England and Wales, Scotland and Northern Ireland) to make, possess, supply or offer to supply image generators that create images of child sexual abuse, as well as the online facilitation of child sexual exploitation and abuse.
- Chapter 2 introduces a new duty (on teachers, healthcare workers and others) to report reported or suspected child sexual abuse to the police or local authorities.
- Chapter 3 amends the Limitation Act 1980 to lift the limitation period on personal injury claims arising from sexual abuse of a child.
- Chapter 4 makes a number of amendments and clarifications to existing sexual offences laws, including:
  - allowing the Secretary of State to issue guidance concerning the child sex offender disclosure scheme (that was introduced following the murder of Sarah Payne)
  - criminalising the creation or supply of generators of "purported intimate images" (i.e. deepfake pornography)
  - amending the Online Safety Act 2023 to introduce a duty on online platforms to promptly take down non-consensually posted intimate images
  - amending the Criminal Justice and Immigration Act 2008 to criminalise the possession of pornographic images of strangulation or suffocation, as well as pornographic images that are (or are purporting to be) incestuous or underage
  - introducing new powers for the government to ensure those appearing in online pornography are of legal age, and have consented
  - amending the law on exposure to broaden the mens rea requirement to include both causing alarm, distress or humiliation to the victim, or for sexual gratification. This follows a recommendation from the Law Commission to align the definition in s66 of the Sexual Offences Act 2003 with the definition used for cyberflashing under s66A.
  - broadening the definitions used in the Sexual Offences Act 2003 criminalising bestiality and necrophilia
  - extending the ability to have "convictions disregarded" that was introduced under the Protection of Freedoms Act 2012 to allow historic convictions for same-sex activity to be annulled to also cover people who were under 18 and convicted of loitering or soliciting for the purpose of prostitution.
- Chapter 5 concerns the management of sex offenders, including requiring registered sex offenders to notify the police about any change of name, as well as intention of being absent from their home address for five days or more.

Part 6 concerns stalking, including the introduction of stalking protection orders.

Part 7 contains other provisions "for the protection of persons", mostly amending the criminal law, including:

- amendment of the rules on domestic abuse protection orders (introduced by the Domestic Abuse Act 2021)
- new offences for causing death or serious injury by dangerous cycling

Part 8 concerns hostility-motivated offences. Section 28 of the Crime and Disorder Act 1998 makes an offence aggravated if motivated (in whole or in part) by racial or religious hostility—the provisions of the Crime and Policing Act extend these to also cover hostility motivated by disability, sexual orientation, transgender identity and sex. It also introduces new offences to further protect emergency workers.

Part 9 deals with theft and fraud. It creates offences that criminalise the handling of devices used to steal cars, as well as offences related to "SIM farms".

Part 10 concerns public order and protests, Part 11 concerns police powers, and Part 12 amends the Proceeds of Crime Act 2002.

Part 13 deals with management of offenders. It extends the criteria for use of polygraph testing to a broader range of offenders (see Offender Management Act 2007).

Part 14 concerns the police. The measures include reform to the handling of complaints and conduct issues related to police officers, the granting of anonymity for authorised firearms officers, and a requirement that policing bodies check to ensure officers they might employ are not barred.

Part 15 contains provisions related to terrorism and national security, including a system of youth diversion orders that can be applied to under 21s at risk of committing terrorist offences.

Part 16 decriminalises abortion in England and Wales by disapplying sections of the Offences Against the Person Act 1861 and Infant Life (Preservation) Act 1929 when applied to one's own pregnancy.

Part 17 contains miscellaneous and general provisions.

== Reception ==
While going through Parliament, the provisions concerning protests and public order were opposed by a coalition of civil society groups including the Trades Union Congress, Amnesty International UK, Greenpeace, Liberty, the Palestine Solidarity Campaign, the National Education Union, and the Quakers in Britain. The public letter stated that the requirement to consider the "cumulative disruption" to an area in deciding whether to permit a protest amounted to a "draconian crackdown" on freedom of expression.

Human Rights Watch criticised other restrictions on protests in the legislation. They stated the power to require that one not cover one's face while protesting risked "penalizing peaceful protesters for legitimate reasons (e.g. health, safety, privacy)" as well as creating a "chilling effect", as well as expressed concerns that the provisions allowing police to forbid protests near places of worship was unnecessary and risked suppressing specific protests.

In pre-legislative scrutiny of the law, Parliament's Joint Committee on Human Rights concluded: "This is the third piece of primary legislation changing the law on public order on which the JCHR has reported in less than five years. Given the importance of free expression and free assembly to a healthy democracy, the Joint Committee on Human Rights is concerned by the volume of recent change to the law on protest."

The ban on certain kinds of pornography was also met with criticism, including by obscenity lawyer Myles Jackman, who called the law "one of the greatest acts of suppression of free speech in global history". Detractors argued that the law was overly broad and would criminalise consensual roleplay between adults, as well as raising concerns over enforcement, suggesting that sites would have to rely on AI-powered tools prone to false positives to flag prohibited content. The statue was also criticised as vague due to the lack of definitions of prohibited acts, with critics suggesting that depictions of oral sex might potentially fall within the ban on suffocation. Elizabeth Nolan Brown, the senior editor of Reason, said the law "could open people up to investigations over private sexual activity", and called it "absurd to throw people into prison for such content, whatever you think of such content yourself." Some legal scholars welcomed the restrictions but questioned how effective they would be if tech platforms did not cooperate with the removal of adult content. A poll by YouGov conducted from 2 to 3 November suggested high public support for the ban.

The provisions decriminalising abortion were supported by the British Medical Association and the Royal College of Nursing, but opposed by anti-abortion groups such as the Society for the Protection of Unborn Children.
