= Terrorism Prevention and Investigation Measures Act 2011 =

Act of the Parliament of the United Kingdom

Terrorism Prevention and Investigation Measures Act 2011 (Note: Section 31(1).)
- Act of Parliament
- Parliament of the United Kingdom
- Long title: An Act to abolish control orders and make provision for the imposition of terrorism prevention and investigation measures.
- Citation: 2011 c. 23
- Introduced by: Theresa May MP, Home Secretary (Commons); Lord Henley (Lords)
- Territorial extent: England and Wales; Scotland; Northern Ireland; (Note: Section 31(3).)

Dates
- Royal assent: 14 December 2011
- Commencement: 15 December 2011 (Note: Section 31(2).)
Other legislation
Amends	Senior Courts Act 1981; Police and Criminal Evidence Act 1984; Criminal Justice Act 1988; Police and Criminal Evidence (Northern Ireland) Order 1989; Regulation of Investigatory Powers Act 2000; Counter-Terrorism Act 2008; Crime and Security Act 2010
Repeals/revokes	Prevention of Terrorism Act 2005
Amended by	Protection of Freedoms Act 2012; Legal Aid, Sentencing and Punishment of Offenders Act 2012; Financial Services Act 2012; Crime and Courts Act 2013; Police and Fire Reform (Scotland) Act 2012 (Consequential Provisions and Modifications) Order 2013; Counter-Terrorism and Security Act 2015; Justice Act (Northern Ireland) 2015; Courts Reform (Scotland) Act 2014 (Consequential Provisions No. 2) Order 2015; Investigatory Powers Act 2016; Counter-Terrorism and Border Security Act 2019; Sentencing Act 2020; Counter-Terrorism and Sentencing Act 2021; Armed Forces Act 2021; Criminal Justice Act 2003 (Commencement No. 33) and Sentencing Act 2020 (Commencement No. 2) Regulations 2022; Judicial Review and Courts Act 2022 (Magistrates' Court Sentencing Powers) Regulations 2023; National Security Act 2023 (Consequential Amendments of Primary Legislation) Regulations 2023; Crime and Policing Act 2026

Status: Amended

Text of statute as originally enacted

Revised text of statute as amended

The Terrorism Prevention and Investigation Measures Act 2011 (c. 23) is an act of the Parliament of the United Kingdom that abolished control orders and provides new powers to allow the Home Secretary to impose restrictions on the behaviour of a specified individual via means of a "TPIM" notice. TPIM notices can include restrictions on movement, financial activity and communication.

== Provisions ==
The act required terror suspects to ask permission for overseas travel, have at most one bank account. The act also prohibited terror suspects from leaving their houses at night, and from meeting specific associates.

== Subsequent developments ==
In the wake of the June 2017 London Bridge attack, Iain Duncan Smith spoke on BBC news programme The World At One to point out that the coalition government that included Theresa May as Home Secretary had "watered down" the civil powers of the Control Order scheme, which were replaced by the TPIM scheme. Duncan Smith talked about how Control Orders provided sweeping powers to put terror suspects under house arrest without convicting them while the TPIM scheme allowed enhanced tracking, such as with ankle monitors, but has resulted much less use. The TPIM scheme ended the power of police to force a suspect to live elsewhere: in other words, police could remove someone from their home, far from where they might plot with associates.
