= Counter-Terrorism and Security Act 2015 =

Act of the Parliament of the United Kingdom

Counter-Terrorism and Security Act 2015 (Note: Section 53.)
- Act of Parliament
- Parliament of the United Kingdom
- Long title: An Act to make provision in relation to terrorism; to make provision about retention of communications data, about information, authority to carry and security in relation to air, sea and rail transport and about reviews by the Special Immigration Appeals Commission against refusals to issue certificates of naturalisation; and for connected purposes.
- Citation: 2015 c. 6
- Introduced by: Theresa May MP, Home Secretary (Commons); Lord Bates (Lords)
- Territorial extent: United Kingdom (Note: Section 51.)

Dates
- Royal assent: 12 February 2015
- Commencement: Various (Note: Section 52.)
Other legislation
Amends	Immigration Act 1971; Senior Courts Act 1981; Aviation Security Act 1982; Criminal Justice Act 1988; Special Immigration Appeals Commission Act 1997; Immigration and Asylum Act 1999; Terrorism Act 2000; Postal Services Act 2000; Nationality, Immigration and Asylum Act 2002; Terrorism Act 2006; Immigration, Asylum and Nationality Act 2006; UK Borders Act 2007; Terrorist Asset-Freezing etc. Act 2010; Terrorism Prevention and Investigation Measures Act 2011; Legal Aid, Sentencing and Punishment of Offenders Act 2012
Amended by	Counter-Terrorism and Security Act 2015 (Risk of Being Drawn into Terrorism) (Amendment and Guidance) Regulations 2015; Qualifications Wales Act 2015; Courts Reform (Scotland) Act 2014 (Consequential Provisions No. 2) Order 2015; Investigatory Powers Act 2016; Wales Act 2017; Data Protection Act 2018; Sanctions and Anti-Money Laundering Act 2018; Regulation and Inspection of Social Care (Wales) Act 2016 (Consequential Amendments) Regulations 2018; Counter-Terrorism and Border Security Act 2019; Newcastle Upon Tyne, North Tyneside and Northumberland Combined Authority (Adult Education Functions) Order 2019; Regulation and Inspection of Social Care (Wales) Act 2016 (Consequential Amendments) Regulations 2019; Sentencing Act 2020; Health and Social Care (Quality and Engagement) (Wales) Act 2020; Counter-Terrorism and Sentencing Act 2021; Health and Care Act 2022; Criminal Justice Act 2003 (Commencement No. 33) and Sentencing Act 2020 (Commencement No. 2) Regulations 2022; Curriculum and Assessment (Wales) Act 2021 (Consequential Amendments) (Primary Legislation) Regulations 2022; Higher Education (Freedom of Speech) Act 2023; Judicial Review and Courts Act 2022 (Magistrates’ Court Sentencing Powers) Regulations 2023; Tertiary Education and Research (Wales) Act 2022 (Consequential Amendments) Order 2024
Relates to	Counter-Terrorism and Security (Jersey) Order 2017

Status: Amended

History of passage through Parliament

Text of statute as originally enacted

Revised text of statute as amended

The Counter-Terrorism and Security Act 2015 (c. 6) is an act of the Parliament of the United Kingdom. It came into force in July 2015.

== Drafting ==
The Counter-Terrorism and Security Bill was proposed by Home Secretary Theresa May in November 2014. The press reported it would require Internet service providers to retain data showing which IP address was allocated to a device at a given time. At that time, companies providing internet services were not required to keep records of extra data that can show which individuals have used a particular IP address at a given time, even though this information exists.

=== Justification ===
The Home Secretary said the new bill would help security services "deal with the increased threat that we now see". She said "This is a step but it doesn't go all the way to ensuring that we can identify all the people we will need to". To "fully identify" everybody, she said police would need the power to access communication data, as previously proposed in the Draft Communications Data Bill.

== Effects ==
In December 2015, under a remit of the act which places local authorities, prisons, NHS trusts and schools under a statutory duty to prevent extremist radicalisation taking place within their walls, teachers reported a 10-year-old boy to the police after he had misspelled the word "terraced" and written "I live in a terrorist house". He was subsequently interviewed by police and social services and had his home searched.This article has now been removed from The Guardian's website pending investigation.

In February 2016, Ken Macdonald warned that the "prevent" aspect of the law risked a "chilling effect" on academic debate and a "deadening impact" on research at universities.

== See also ==
- Terrorism Act 2000
- Counter-Terrorism Act 2008
- National Counter Terrorism Policing Network
- Counter Terrorism Command
- CONTEST
- Mass surveillance in the United Kingdom
