= Scrap Metal Dealers Act 2013 =

Act of the Parliament of the United Kingdom

Scrap Metal Dealers Act 2013 (Note: Section 23(4).)
- Act of Parliament
- Parliament of the United Kingdom
- Long title: An Act to amend the law relating to scrap metal dealers; and for connected purposes
- Citation: 2013 c. 10
- Introduced by: Richard Ottaway (Commons); Angela Browning (Lords)
- Territorial extent: England and Wales (Note: Section 23(1).)

Dates
- Royal assent: 28 February 2013
- Commencement: Various (Note: Section 23(2)–(3).)
Other legislation
Amends	Local Government (Wales) Act 1994; Vehicle Excise and Registration Act 1994; Vehicles (Crime) Act 2001; Communications Act 2003; Regulatory Enforcement and Sanctions Act 2008; Legal Aid, Sentencing and Punishment of Offenders Act 2012; Finance Act 2021
Repeals/revokes	Scrap Metal Dealers Act 1964
Amended by	Environmental Permitting (England and Wales) Regulations 2016

Status: Amended

History of passage through Parliament

Text of statute as originally enacted

Revised text of statute as amended

Scrap Metal Dealers Act 1964 (Note: Section 11(1).)
- Act of Parliament
- Parliament of the United Kingdom
- Long title: An Act to amend the law relating to dealers in scrap metal and similar goods, and to dealers in marine stores, and for purposes connected therewith.
- Citation: 1964 c. 69
- Territorial extent: England and Wales (Note: Section 11(3).)

Dates
- Royal assent: 31 July 1964
- Commencement: 1 April 1965 (Note: Section 11(2).)
- Repealed: 1 October 2013 (Note: The Scrap Metal Dealers Act 2013 (Commencement and Transitional Provisions) Order 2013 (SI 2013/1966).)
Other legislation
Amended by	Statute Law (Repeals) Act 1993; Local Government (Wales) Act 1994; Vehicle Excise and Registration Act 1994; Vehicles (Crime) Act 2001; Statute Law (Repeals) Act 2004; Legal Aid, Sentencing and Punishment of Offenders Act 2012; Scrap Metal Dealers Act 2013
Repealed by	Scrap Metal Dealers Act 2013

Status: Repealed

Text of statute as originally enacted

Revised text of statute as amended

The Scrap Metal Dealers Act 2013 (c. 10) is an act of the Parliament of the United Kingdom which repealed the Scrap Metal Dealers Act 1964 (c. 69), certain linked legislation, and part 1 of Vehicles (Crime) Act 2001 relating to scrap metal dealers. A 2012 amendment to the Scrap Metal Dealers Act 1964, made by section 146 of the Legal Aid, Sentencing and Punishment of Offenders Act 2012 which created the offence of buying scrap metal for cash, was retained and re-enacted.

== Intent ==
The intent of the act is to prevent metal theft that can then be sold on for cash. The over-riding intention is to ensure traceability and create an effective audit trail, and therefore scrap metal dealers will need to take details of the seller and record it rather than pay cash for metal. Payment by cheque or funds transfer is permitted. Exchange of scrap metal for other goods or services is not permitted.

== Provisions ==
Scrap metal dealers must acquire a licence from their local authority. Local authorities are enabled to charge a fee to cover the cost of the licence.
