= Terrorism Act 2000 =

Act of the Parliament of the United Kingdom against terrorism

Terrorism Act 2000 (Note: Section 131.)
- Act of Parliament
- Parliament of the United Kingdom
- Long title: An Act to make provision about terrorism; and to make temporary provision for Northern Ireland about the prosecution and punishment of certain offences, the preservation of peace and the maintenance of order.
- Citation: 2000 c. 11
- Territorial extent: United Kingdom (Note: Section 130. This is subject to sections 130(2) to (6) which provide that sections 59 to 61, Part VII and Schedules 5, 15 and 16 do not extend to the United Kingdom.)

Dates
- Royal assent: 20 July 2000
- Commencement: Various (Note: Section 128.)
Other legislation
Amends	Criminal Justice Act 1967; Treatment of Offenders Act (Northern Ireland) 1968; Northern Ireland Assembly Disqualification Act 1975; Suppression of Terrorism Act 1978; Criminal Justice (Scotland) Act 1980; Legal Aid, Advice and Assistance (Northern Ireland) Order 1981; Police and Criminal Evidence Act 1984; Law Reform (Miscellaneous Provisions) (Scotland) Act 1985; Criminal Justice Act 1988; Extradition Act 1989; Elected Authorities (Northern Ireland) Act 1989; Police and Criminal Evidence (Northern Ireland) Order 1989; Insolvency (Northern Ireland) Order 1989; Criminal Justice Act 1993; Criminal Justice and Public Order Act 1994; Drug Trafficking Act 1994; Criminal Procedure (Consequential Provisions) (Scotland) Act 1995; Proceeds of Crime (Scotland) Act 1995; Northern Ireland (Remission of Sentences) Act 1995; Police (Amendment) (Northern Ireland) Order 1995; Criminal Procedure and Investigations Act 1996; Proceeds of Crime (Northern Ireland) Order 1996; Northern Ireland Arms Decommissioning Act 1997; Northern Ireland (Sentences) Act 1998; Criminal Justice (Terrorism and Conspiracy) Act 1998; Criminal Justice (Children) (Northern Ireland) Order 1998; Access to Justice Act 1999; Immigration and Asylum Act 1999; Powers of Criminal Courts (Sentencing) Act 2000
Repeals/revokes	Prevention of Terrorism (Temporary Provisions) Act 1989; Prevention of Terrorism (Additional Powers) Act 1996; Northern Ireland (Emergency Provisions) Act 1996; Northern Ireland (Emergency Provisions) Act 1998
Amended by	List: Criminal Justice and Police Act 2001; Armed Forces Act 2001; Land Registration Act 2002; Justice (Northern Ireland) Act 2002; Proceeds of Crime Act 2002; Enterprise Act 2002; Police (Northern Ireland) Act 2003; Railways and Transport Safety Act 2003; Crime (International Co-operation) Act 2003; Courts Act 2003; Extradition Act 2003; Criminal Justice Act 2003; Criminal Justice (Northern Ireland) Order 2003; Terrorism Act 2000 (Business in the Regulated Sector and Supervisory Authorities) Order 2003; Justice (Northern Ireland) Act 2004; Energy Act 2004; Pensions Act 2004; Firearms (Northern Ireland) Order 2004; Criminal Justice (Northern Ireland) Order 2004; British Transport Police (Transitional and Consequential Provisions) Order 2004; Medicines (Marketing Authorisations and Miscellaneous Amendments) Regulations 2004; Life Assurance Consolidation Directive (Consequential Amendments) Regulations 2004; Constitutional Reform Act 2005; Commissioners for Revenue and Customs Act 2005; Serious Organised Crime and Police Act 2005; Gambling Act 2005; Terrorism Act 2000 (Proscribed Organisations) (Amendment) Order 2005; Terrorism (Northern Ireland) Act 2006; Terrorism Act 2006; Fraud Act 2006; Wireless Telegraphy Act 2006; Terrorism Act 2000 (Proscribed Organisations) (Amendment) Order 2006; Terrorism Act 2000 (Business in the Regulated Sector) Order 2006; Capital Requirements Regulations 2006; Financial Services and Markets Act 2000 (Regulated Activities) (Amendment No. 3) Order 2006; Bankruptcy and Diligence etc. (Scotland) Act 2007; Justice and Security (Northern Ireland) Act 2007; Terrorism Act 2000 (Business in the Regulated Sector) Order 2007; Police and Criminal Evidence (Amendment) (Northern Ireland) Order 2007; Policing (Miscellaneous Provisions) (Northern Ireland) Order 2007; Terrorism Act 2000 (Proscribed Organisations) (Amendment) Order 2007; Terrorism Act 2000 (Business in the Regulated Sector and Supervisory Authorities) Order 2007; Terrorism Act 2000 and Proceeds of Crime Act 2002 (Amendment) Regulations 2007; Counter-Terrorism Act 2008; Companies Act 2006 (Consequential Amendments etc) Order 2008; Terrorism Act 2000 (Proscribed Organisations) (Amendment) Order 2008; Terrorism Act 2000 (Proscribed Organisations) (Amendment) (No. 2) Order 2008; Criminal Justice and Licensing (Scotland) Act 2010; Crime and Security Act 2010; Terrorism Act 2000 (Proscribed Organisations) (Amendment) Order 2010; Localism Act 2011; Electronic Money Regulations 2011; Terrorism Act 2000 (Proscribed Organisations) (Amendment) Order 2011; Treaty of Lisbon (Changes in Terminology) Order 2011; Terrorism Act 2000 (Designated Ports) Order 2011; Terrorism Act 2000 and Proceeds of Crime Act 2002 (Business in the Regulated Sector) Order 2011; Protection of Freedoms Act 2012; Legal Aid, Sentencing and Punishment of Offenders Act 2012; Financial Services Act 2012; Terrorism Act 2000 and Proceeds of Crime Act 2002 (Business in the Regulated Sector) Order 2012; Terrorism Act 2000 (Proscribed Organisations) (Amendment) Order 2012; Treaty of Lisbon (Changes in Terminology or Numbering) Order 2012; Terrorism Act 2000 and Proceeds of Crime Act 2002 (Business in the Regulated Sector) (No.2) Order 2012; Terrorism Act 2000 (Proscribed Organisations) (Amendment) (No.2) Order 2012; Crime and Courts Act 2013; Police and Fire Reform (Scotland) Act 2012 (Consequential Provisions and Modifications) Order 2013; Terrorism Act 2000 (Proscribed Organisations) (Amendment) Order 2013; Alternative Investment Fund Managers Regulations 2013; Capital Requirements Regulations 2013; Terrorism Act 2000 (Proscribed Organisations) (Amendment) (No.2) Order 2013; Anti-social Behaviour, Crime and Policing Act 2014; Co-operative and Community Benefit Societies Act 2014; Enterprise and Regulatory Reform Act 2013 (Competition) (Consequential, Transitional and Saving Provisions) Order 2014; Terrorism Act 2000 (Proscribed Organisations) (Amendment) Order 2014; Terrorism Act 2000 (Proscribed Organisations) (Amendment) (No. 2) Order 2014; Terrorism Act 2000 (Proscribed Organisations) (Amendment) (No. 3) Order 2014; Criminal Justice and Courts Act 2015; Counter-Terrorism and Security Act 2015; Deregulation Act 2015; Terrorism Act 2000 (Proscribed Organisations) (Amendment) Order 2015; Solvency 2 Regulations 2015; Terrorism Act 2000 (Proscribed Organisations) (Amendment) (No. 2) Order 2015; Criminal Justice (Scotland) Act 2016; Terrorism Act 2000 (Proscribed Organisations) (Amendment) Order 2016; Financial Services and Markets Act 2000 (Market Abuse) Regulations 2016; Terrorism Act 2000 (Proscribed Organisations) (Amendment) (No. 2) Order 2016; Bankruptcy (Scotland) Act 2016 (Consequential Provisions and Modifications) Order 2016; Terrorism Act 2000 (Proscribed Organisations) (Amendment) (No. 3) Order 2016; Policing and Crime Act 2017; Criminal Finances Act 2017; Bank of England and Financial Services (Consequential Amendments) Regulations 2017; Criminal Justice (Scotland) Act 2016 (Consequential and Supplementary Modifications) Regulations 2017; Financial Services and Markets Act 2000 (Regulated Activities) (Amendment) Order 2017; Money Laundering, Terrorist Financing and Transfer of Funds (Information on the Payer) Regulations 2017; Financial Services and Markets Act 2000 (Markets in Financial Instruments) Regulations 2017; Terrorism Act 2000 (Proscribed Organisations) (Amendment) Order 2017; Data Protection Act 2018; Taxation (Cross-border Trade) Act 2018; Insurance Distribution (Regulated Activities and Miscellaneous Amendments) Order 2018; Counter-Terrorism and Border Security Act 2019; Terrorism Act 2000 (Proscribed Organisations) (Amendment) Order 2019; Law Enforcement and Security (Amendment) (EU Exit) Regulations 2019; Terrorism Act 2000 (Proscribed Organisations) (Amendment) (No. 2) Order 2019; Money Laundering and Terrorist Financing (Amendment) Regulations 2019; Sentencing Act 2020; Terrorism Act 2000 (Proscribed Organisations) (Amendment) Order 2020; Terrorism Act 2000 (Proscribed Organisations) (Amendment) (No. 2) Order 2020; Counter-Terrorism and Sentencing Act 2021; Armed Forces Act 2021; Terrorism Act 2000 (Proscribed Organisations) (Amendment) Order 2021; Terrorism Act 2000 (Proscribed Organisations) (Amendment) (No. 2) Order 2021; Terrorism Act 2000 (Proscribed Organisations) (Amendment) (No. 3) Order 2021; Financial Services Act 2021 (Prudential Regulation of Credit Institutions and Investment Firms) (Consequential Amendments and Miscellaneous Provisions) Regulations 2021; Police, Crime, Sentencing and Courts Act 2022; Nationality and Borders Act 2022; Criminal Justice Act 2003 (Commencement No. 33) and Sentencing Act 2020 (Commencement No. 2) Regulations 2022; Police, Crime, Sentencing and Courts Act 2022 (Consequential Provision) Regulations 2022; Financial Services Act 2021 (Prudential Regulation of Credit Institutions and Investment Firms) (Consequential Amendments and Miscellaneous Provisions) Regulations 2022; National Security Act 2023; Economic Crime and Corporate Transparency Act 2023; Judicial Review and Courts Act 2022 (Magistrates' Court Sentencing Powers) Regulations 2023; Terrorism Act 2000 (Proscribed Organisations) (Amendment) Order 2023; National Security Act 2023 (Consequential Amendments of Primary Legislation) Regulations 2023; Terrorism Act 2000 (Proscribed Organisations) (Amendment) Order 2024; Terrorism Act 2000 (Proscribed Organisations) (Amendment) (No. 2) Order 2024; Insurance Distribution (Regulated Activities and Miscellaneous Amendments) Regulations 2024; Border Security, Asylum and Immigration Act 2025; Terrorism Act 2000 (Proscribed Organisations) (Amendment) Order 2025; Public Offers and Admissions to Trading (Amendment and Consequential and Transitional Provisions) Regulations 2025; Crime and Policing Act 2026; Financial Services and Markets Act 2000 (Regulated Activities) (Providing Targeted Support) (Amendment) Order 2026; Money Laundering and Terrorist Financing (Amendment) Regulations 2026

Status: Amended

Text of statute as originally enacted

Revised text of statute as amended

The Terrorism Act 2000 (c. 11) is an act of the Parliament of the United Kingdom. The act was the first of a number of general Terrorism Acts passed by the Parliament of the United Kingdom. It superseded and repealed the Prevention of Terrorism (Temporary Provisions) Act 1989 and the Northern Ireland (Emergency Provisions) Act 1996. It also replaced parts of the Criminal Justice (Terrorism and Conspiracy) Act 1998. The powers it provides the police have been controversial, leading to noted cases of alleged abuse, and to legal challenges in British and European courts. The stop-and-search powers under section 44 of the act have been ruled incompatible with the European Convention on Human Rights.

== Definition of terrorism ==
Terrorism is defined, in the first section of the act, as follows:

(1) In this Act "terrorism" means the use or threat of action where-

(a) the action falls within subsection (2),
(b) the use or threat is designed to influence the government [or an international governmental organisation] or to intimidate the public or a section of the public, and
(c) the use or threat is made for the purpose of advancing a political, religious[, racial] or ideological cause.

(2) Action falls within this subsection if it-

(a) involves serious violence against a person,
(b) involves serious damage to property,
(c) endangers a person's life, other than that of the person committing the action,
(d) creates a serious risk to the health or safety of the public or a section of the public, or
(e) is designed seriously to interfere with or seriously to disrupt an electronic system.

(3) The use or threat of action falling within subsection (2) which involves the use of firearms or explosives is terrorism whether or not subsection (1)(b) is satisfied.

Sections (2)(b) and (e) have been criticised as falling well outside the scope of what is generally understood to be the definition of terrorism, i.e. acts that require life-threatening violence.

Prior to this, terrorism was defined in an act as a footnote, such as Reinsurance (Acts of Terrorism) Act 1993 (c. 18) section 2(2):

"acts of terrorism" means acts of persons acting on behalf of, or in connection with, any organisation which carries out activities directed towards the overthrowing or influencing, by force or violence, of Her Majesty's government in the United Kingdom or any other government de jure or de facto.

and Prevention of Terrorism (Temporary Provisions) Act 1989 (c. 4) section 20(1):

In this Act "terrorism" means the use of violence for political ends, and includes any use of violence for the purpose of putting the public or any section of the public in fear.

In the Northern Ireland (Emergency Provisions) Act 1996, the criminal offences referred to as terrorism are provided as an exhaustive list of over 70 items.

This move to establish a sound definition of terrorism in the law made it possible to build an entirely new set of police and investigatory powers into incidents of this kind, beyond what they could do for ordinary violent offences.

The inclusion in its definition of the phrase or threat mirrors the common law, as it was codified with respect to written words, in 27 Geo. 2. c. 15 (1754) and again in 4 Geo. 4. c. 54 (1823).

== Proscribed groups ==
As in previous Terrorism Acts, such as the Prevention of Terrorism (Temporary Provisions) Act 1989, the Home Secretary had the power to maintain a list of "proscribed groups" that they believe are "concerned in terrorism". The act of being a member of, or supporting such a group, or wearing an item of clothing such as "to arouse reasonable suspicion that he is a member or supporter of a proscribed organisation" is sufficient to be prosecuted for a terrorist offence.

Under the act aliases of organisations can be added. For example, Al Muhajiroun, Islam4UK, Call to Submission, Islamic Path, London School of Sharia and Muslims Against Crusades were added in January 2010 and November 2011 as alternative names for Al Ghurabaa and The Saved Sect (also deemed to be the same organisation) and in June 2014 Need4Khilafah, the Shariah Project and the Islamic Dawah Association were added to this list. An alias does not have to be added to the list for prosecution to be possible, provided it can be demonstrated that for all intents and purposes the organisation is a proscribed one, and that the person involved has committed a proscribed act.

=== List of proscribed terrorist groups ===
As of July 2025, more than 80 organisations appear in Schedule 2 of the act. They are all listed in Schedule 2 of the act.

==== List of proscribed groups linked to Northern Ireland-related terrorism ====
The following 14 organisations have appeared in Schedule 2 of the act since it came into force. and are listed under the above heading in the Home Office document 'Proscribed Terrorist Organisations' under the collective description "organisations in Northern Ireland that were proscribed under previous legislation". They are armed paramilitary groups proscribed because of involvement in the Troubles;

- Continuity Army Council (CAC)
- Cumann na mBan
- Fianna na hÉireann, a name claimed by multiple groups
- Irish National Liberation Army (INLA)
- Irish People's Liberation Organisation (IPLO)
- Irish Republican Army (IRA), a name claimed by multiple groups
- Loyalist Volunteer Force (LVF)
- Orange Volunteers
- Red Hand Commando
- Red Hand Defenders
- Saor Éire
- Ulster Defence Association (UDA)
- "Ulster Freedom Fighters" (UFF), a cover name for UDA
- Ulster Volunteer Force (UVF)

==== List of additional UK and International proscribed organisations ====
These have been added periodically since March 2001 by statutory instruments.

- 17 November Revolutionary Organisation (17N) (since March 2001)
- Abdullah Azzam Brigades (AAB) including the Ziyad al-Jarrah Battalions (since June 2014)
- Abu Nidal Organisation (ANO) (since March 2001)
- Abu Sayyaf (ASG) (since March 2001)
- Anjad Misr (Soldiers of Egypt) (since November 2014)
- al-Ashtar Brigades including Saraya al-Ashtar, Wa’ad Allah Brigades, Islamic Allah Brigades, Imam al-Mahdi Brigades and al-Haydariyah Brigades (since December 2017)
- Al-Gama'at al-Islamiya (GI) (since March 2001)
- Al Gurabaa (since July 2006)
- Al Ittihad Al Islamia (AIAI) (since October 2005)
- Al Murabitun (since April 2014)
- Al-Mukhtar Brigades including Saraya al-Mukhtar (since December 2017)
- Al Qa'ida (since March 2001) (also as al-Nusrah Front (ANF), Jabhat al-Nusrah li-ahl al Sham, Jabhat Fatah alSham and Hay'at Tahrir al-Sham)
- Al Shabaab (since March 2010)
- Ansar Al Islam (AI) (since October 2005)
- Ansar Al Sharia-Benghazi (AAS-B) (since November 2014)
- Ansar Al Sharia-Tunisia (AAS-T) (since April 2014)
- Ansar Al Sunna (AS) (since October 2005)
- Ansar Bayt al-Maqdis (ABM) (since April 2014)
- Ansaroul Islam also known as Ansar ul Islam and Ansaroul Islam Lil Irchad Wal Jihad (since March 2019)
- Ansarul Muslimina Fi Biladis Sudan (Vanguard for the protection of Muslims in Black Africa) (Ansaru) (since November 2012)
- Armed Islamic Group (Groupe Islamique Armée) (GIA) (since March 2001)
- Asbat Al-Ansar ('League of Partisans' or 'Band of Helpers') (since November 2002)
- Atomwaffen Division (AWD) including National Socialist Order (NSO) (since April 2021)
- Babbar Khalsa (BK) (since March 2001)
- The Base (since July 2021)
- Basque Homeland and Liberty (Euskadi ta Askatasuna) (ETA) (since March 2001)
- Baluchistan Liberation Army (BLA) (since July 2006)
- Boko Haram (Jama'atu Ahli Sunna Lidda Awati Wal Jihad) (BH) (since July 2013)
- Egyptian Islamic Jihad (EIJ) (since March 2001)
- Feuerkrieg Division (FKD) (since July 2020)
- Global Islamic Media Front (GIMF) including GIMF Banlga Team also known as Ansarullah Bangla Team (ABT) and Ansar-al Islam (since July 2016)
- Groupe Islamique Combattant Marocain (GICM) (since October 2005)
- Harakat al Muqawama al-Islamiyya (Hamas) (since November 2021); previously Izz ad-Din al-Qassam Brigades (since March 2001)
- Harakat-Ul-Jihad-Ul-Islami (HUJI) (since October 2005)
- Harkat-ul-Jihad al-Islami Bangladesh (HUJI-B): (since October 2005)
- Harakat-Ul-Mujahideen/Alami (HuM/A) and Jundallah (since October 2005)
- Harkat-ul-Mujahideen (HM) (since March 2001)
- Haqqani Network (HQN) (since March 2015)
- Hasam, Harakat Sawa’d Misr, Harakat Hasm and Hasm (since December 2017)
- Hizb ut-Tahrir (since January 2024)
- Hizballah (since March 2019)
- Imarat Kavkaz (IK) (also known as the Caucasus Emirate) (since December 2013)
- Indian Mujahideen (IM)(since July 2012)
- Islamic Army of Aden (IAA) (since March 2001)
- Islamic Jihad Union (IJU) (since July 2005)
- Islamic Movement of Uzbekistan (IMU) (since November 2002)
- Islamic State of Iraq and the Levant (ISIL) (since June 2014) also known as Dawlat al-'Iraq al-Islamiyya, Islamic State of Iraq (ISI), Islamic State of Iraq and Syria (ISIS) and Dawlat al Islamiya fi Iraq wa al Sham (DAISh) and the Islamic State in Iraq and Sham
- Jaish e Mohammed (JeM) (since March 2001) and splinter group Khuddam Ul-Islam (Kul) (since October 2005)
- Jamaah Anshorut Daulah (since July 2016)
- Jama'at Nasr al-Islam wal Muslimin also known as Jamaat Nusrat al-Islam Wal-Muslimin (JNIM), Nusrat al-Islam, Nusrat al-Islam wal Muslimeen (NIM), including Ansar al-Dine (AAD), Macina Liberation Front (MLF), al-Murabitun, al-Qa’ida in the Maghreb and az-Zallaqa (since March 2019)
- Jamaat ul-Ahrar (JuA) (since March 2015)
- Jammat-ul Mujahideen Bangladesh (JMB) (since July 2007)
- Jamaat Ul-Furquan (JuF) (since October 2005)
- Jaysh al Khalifatu Islamiya (JKI) (since November 2014)
- Jeemah Islamiyah (JI) (since November 2002)
- Jund al-Aqsa (JAA) (since January 2015)
- Jund al Khalifa-Algeria (JaK-A) (since January 2015)
- Kateeba al-Kawthar (KaK) also known as Ajnad al-sham and Junud ar-Rahman al Muhajireen (since June 2014)
- Lashkar e Tayyaba (LT) (since March 2001) also known as Jama’at' ud Da’wa (JuD)
- Liberation Tigers of Tamil Eelam (LTTE) (since March 2001)
- Liwa al-Thawra (since December 2017)
- Maniac Murder Cult (MMC) (MKU) (MKY) (since July 2025)
- Minbar Ansar Deen (also known as Ansar al-Sharia UK) (since July 2013)
- Mujahidin Indonesia Timur (MIT) (since July 2016)
- National Action also known as Scottish Dawn, NS131 (National Socialist Anti-Capitalist Action) and System Resistance Network (SRN) (since December 2016)
- Palestine Action (since July 2025)
- Palestinian Islamic Jihad – Shaqaqi (PIJ) (since March 2001)
- Kurdistan Workers Party (Partiya Karkeren Kurdistan) (PKK) also known as KADEK and Kongra-Gel (since March 2001) and related group Teyre Azadiye Kurdistan (TAK), also known as Hezen Parastina Gel (HPG) (since 2006)
- Popular Front for the Liberation of Palestine-General Command (PFLP-GC) (since June 2014)
- Revolutionary Peoples' Liberation Party - Front (Devrimci Halk Kurtulus Partisi – Cephesi) (DHKP-C) (since March 2001)
- Russian Imperial Movement (RIM) (RID), including Russian Imperial Legion (RIL) (since July 2025)
- Salafist Group for Preaching and Combat (Groupe Salafiste pour la Predication et le Combat) (GSPC) (since March 2001)
- Saved Sect or Saviour Sect (since July 2006)
- Sipah-e-Sahaba Pakistan (SSP) (renamed Millat-E Islami Pakistan (MIP) in April 2003) and splinter group Lashkar-e-Jhangvi (LeJ) (since March 2001)
- Sonnenkrieg Division (SKD) (since February 2020)
- Tehrik Nefaz-e Shari'at Muhammadi (TNSM) (since July 2007)
- Tehrik-e Taliban Pakistan (TTP) (since January 2011)
- Turkestan Islamic Party (TIP) also known as East Turkestan Islamic Party (ETIP), East Turkestan Islamic Movement (ETIM) and Hizb al-Islami al-Turkistani (HAAT) (since July 2016)
- Turkiye Halk Kurtulus Partisi-Cephesi (THKP-C) also known as the Peoples' Liberation Party/Front of Turkey, THKP-C Acilciler and the Hasty Ones (since June 2014)
- Wagner Group (PMC-W) (since September 2023)

=== List of formerly proscribed groups ===
- Mujaheddin e Khalq (MeK) was removed from the list in June 2008, as a result of judgements of the Proscribed Organisations Appeal Commission and the Court of Appeal.
- International Sikh Youth Federation (ISYF) was deproscribed in March 2016.
- Hezb-e Islami Gulbuddin (HIG) was deproscribed in December 2017.
- Libyan Islamic Fighting Group (LIFG) was deproscribed in November 2019.

== Provisions ==
=== Section 41 (arrest without warrant) ===
Section 41 of the act provided the police with the power to arrest and detain a person without charge for up to 48 hours if they were suspected of being a terrorist. This period of detention could be extended to up to seven days if the police can persuade a judge that it is necessary for further questioning.

This was a break from ordinary criminal law where suspects had to be charged within 24 hours of detention or be released. This period was later extended to 14 days by the Criminal Justice Act 2003, and to 28 days by the Terrorism Act 2006.

=== Stop and search without suspicion ===
==== Section 44 ====
The most commonly encountered use of the act was outlined in Section 44 which enables the police and the Home Secretary to define any area in the country as well as a time period wherein they could stop and search any vehicle or person, and seize "articles of a kind which could be used in connection with terrorism". Unlike other stop and search powers that the police can use, Section 44 does not require the police to have "reasonable suspicion" that an offence has been committed, to search an individual.

In 2009, over 100,000 searches were conducted under the powers, but none of these resulted in people being arrested for terrorism offences. 504 were arrested for other offences.

In January 2010, the European Court of Human Rights ruled that stop-and-search powers granted under Section 44 were incompatible with the European Convention on Human Rights. It held that the rights under Article 8 of two people stopped in 2003 outside the ExCeL convention centre in London, which at the time was hosting a military equipment exhibition, had been breached. The Court found the powers were "not sufficiently circumscribed" and lacked "adequate legal safeguards against abuse", contrary to a 2003 High Court judgment upheld at the Court of Appeal and the House of Lords.

Pending new powers in the Protection of Freedoms Bill (see Section 47A), Theresa May made a remedial order under the Human Rights Act 1998 (the Terrorism Act 2000 (Remedial) Order 2011), which had the effect of repealing sections 44, 45, 46 and most of section 47.

Members of the public and the media do not need a permit to film or photograph in public places and police have no power to stop them filming or photographing incidents or police personnel.

— London Metropolitan Police Service, Photography Advice

==== Section 47A ====
As discussed above, since 18 March 2011 section 44 has been treated as repealed. It has been replaced with a new section 47A by the Terrorism Act 2000 (Remedial) Order 2011. Under the new provisions, searches can only be carried out as follows:

A senior police officer must make an authorisation in relation to a specified area or place. He can make such an authorisation only if he:

- reasonably suspects that an act of terrorism will take place, and
- considers that:
  - the authorisation is necessary to prevent such an act,
  - the specified area or place is no greater than is necessary to prevent such an act, and
  - the duration of the authorisation is no longer than is necessary to prevent such an act.

When such an authorisation is in force, any constable in uniform can, in the specified area or place, stop:

- a vehicle, and search:
  - the vehicle,
  - the driver of the vehicle,
  - a passenger in the vehicle, and
  - anything in or on the vehicle or carried by the driver or a passenger,
- a pedestrian, and search:
  - the pedestrian, and
  - anything carried by the pedestrian.

But the power to search can only be used for the purpose of discovering whether there is anything which may constitute evidence that:

- the vehicle concerned is being used for the purposes of terrorism, or that
- the person concerned is or has been concerned in the commission, preparation or instigation of acts of terrorism.

The power conferred by such an authorisation may be exercised whether or not the constable reasonably suspects that there is such evidence. A person or vehicle searched under this power may be detained for as long as is reasonably required. A person who is searched may be required to remove their headgear, footwear, outer coat, jacket or gloves, but nothing else whilst in public. If requested, a form must be given stating that the person/vehicle was stopped.

An authorisation can be given by an Assistant Chief Constable (or if the area is in the Metropolitan Police District or the City of London, then a Commander of the Metropolitan Police/City of London Police). Authorisations can also be given by the Assistant Chief Constables of:

- the British Transport Police, in relation to railway property,
- the Ministry of Defence Police, in relation to military land, ordnance factories or dockyards, or other places where the Ministry of Defence Police have an agreement to police (some gas terminals),
- the Civil Nuclear Constabulary, in relation to nuclear power stations and associated land, and land up to 5 kilometres from such places.

If given verbally, authorisations must be confirmed in writing as soon as reasonably practicable, and in either case must be notified to the Home Office as soon as reasonably practicable. Authorisations must be confirmed by the Home Office within 48 hours of their being made, or they expire automatically. If confirmed, an authorisation can only last for up to 14 days. An authorisation can be cancelled at any time, or restricted in respect of the time it ends or the area which it covers, but it cannot be expanded. New authorisations can be made regardless of whether previous authorisations exist, or have been cancelled or have expired.

=== Section 58 – Collection of information ===
This section creates the offence, liable to a prison term of up to fifteen years, to collect, possess, or access, "information of a kind likely to be useful to a person committing or preparing an act of terrorism".

Sections 57–58, possession offences: Section 57 is dealing with possessing articles for the purpose of terrorist acts. Section 58 is dealing with collecting or holding information that is of a kind likely to be useful to those involved in acts of terrorism. In 2019, this section was amended to include accessing such information online in the definition of the offence. Section 57 includes a specific intention, section 58 does not.

Bilal Zaheer Ahmad, 23, from Wolverhampton, is believed to be the first person convicted of collecting information likely to be of use to a terrorist, including the al-Qaeda publication Inspire.

=== Part 7 ===
Part 7, comprising sections 65 to 113, contained particular provisions applying to Northern Ireland, that were to require parliamentary approval on an annual basis by means of a statutory instrument to continue in force. The part replaced previous provisions under the Northern Ireland (Emergency Provisions) Act 1996.

Part 7 was succeeded by the Terrorism (Northern Ireland) Act 2006, which in turn was succeeded by the Justice and Security (Northern Ireland) Act 2007.

==== Section 75 (trials without a jury) ====
Section 75 provided for bench trials instead of jury trials in Northern Ireland for scheduled offences, continuing the system of Diplock courts first established in 1973.

==== Schedules ====
The act has 16 Schedules.

=== Terrorist connection ===
Although the act creates a number of specific terrorism offences, its definition of terrorism is also used in sentencing for some non-terrorism offences. Under section 69 of the Sentencing Act 2020, a court sentencing an offender for certain offences must consider whether the offence had a "terrorist connection".

A terrorist connection may be found where the offence was, or took place in the course of, an act of terrorism, or was committed for the purposes of terrorism. The test therefore relies on the definition of terrorism in section 1 of the Terrorism Act 2000, including action involving serious violence, serious damage to property, serious risk to public safety, or serious interference with an electronic system, where the remaining statutory elements are satisfied.

The Counter-Terrorism and Sentencing Act 2021 expanded the sentencing regime by requiring courts to consider terrorist connection findings for a wider range of non-terrorism offences punishable by more than two years' imprisonment, unless expressly excluded.

A finding of terrorist connection is treated as a statutory aggravating factor and may also trigger terrorism-related ancillary consequences, including notification requirements.

== Penalties ==
From the Terrorism Act 2000

- Section 11 membership of a proscribed organisation - 10 years or a fine or both
- Section 12 support of a proscribed organisation - 10 years or a fine or both
- Section 13: "A person in a public place commits an offence if he (a)wears an item of clothing, or (b)wears, carries or displays an article, in such a way or in such circumstances as to arouse reasonable suspicion that he is a member or supporter of a proscribed organisation." - 6 months or a statutory fine
- Section 15 fund raising for a proscribed organisation
- Section 16 using money or property for terrorism
- Section 17 funding terrorism
- Section 18 money laundering to aid terrorism
- Section 19 failure to disclose information - 5 years or a fine or both
- Section 21A failure to disclose information: regulated sector - 5 years or a fine or both
- Section 21D tipping off: regulated sector - 2 years or a fine or both
  - Section 22 penalties for an offence in sections 15 to 18 – 14 years or a fine or both
- Section 36 disobeying a constable in a cordoned area - 3 months or a fine or both
- Section 38B failure to disclose information about an act of terrorism - 5 years or a fine or both
- Section 39 unauthorised disclosure of information - 5 years or a fine or both
- Section 47 failing to stop when required by a constable - 6 months or a level 5 fine or both
- Section 51 parking in a prohibited area - 3 months or level 4 fine or both
- Section 54 receiving or giving weapons training for terrorism - 10 years or a fine or both
- Section 56 directing terrorist organisation - life imprisonment
- Section 57 possession for terrorist purposes - 15 years or a fine or both
- Section 58 collection of information to aid terrorism - 15 years or a fine or both
- Section 58A eliciting, publishing or communicating information about members of armed forces - 10 years or a fine or both
- Section 87 preventing an examination of documents - two years or a fine or both
- Section 103 (crown official) possessing or communicating or collecting information useful for terrorism - 10 years or a fine or both

=== Incitement crimes ===
- Section 59 inciting terrorism overseas: England and Wales - same penalty as under the appropriate Act
  - (a) murder,
  - (b) an offence under section 18 of the Offences against the Person Act 1861 (wounding with intent),
  - (c) an offence under section 23 or 24 of that Act (poison),
  - (d) an offence under section 28 or 29 of that Act (explosions), and
  - (e) an offence under section 1(2) of the Criminal Damage Act 1971 (endangering life by damaging property).
- Section 60 inciting terrorism overseas: Northern Ireland - same penalty as under the appropriate Act
  - (a) murder,
  - (b) an offence under section 18 of the Offences against the Person Act 1861 (wounding with intent),
  - (c) an offence under section 23 or 24 of that Act (poison),
  - (d) an offence under section 28 or 29 of that Act (explosions), and
  - (e) an offence under Article 3(2) of the Criminal Damage (Northern Ireland) Order 1977 (endangering life by damaging property).
- Section 61 inciting terrorism overseas: Scotland - same penalty as under the appropriate Act
  - (a) murder,
  - (b) assault to severe injury, and
  - (c) reckless conduct which causes actual injury.

== Stop and search, arrest and conviction rates ==
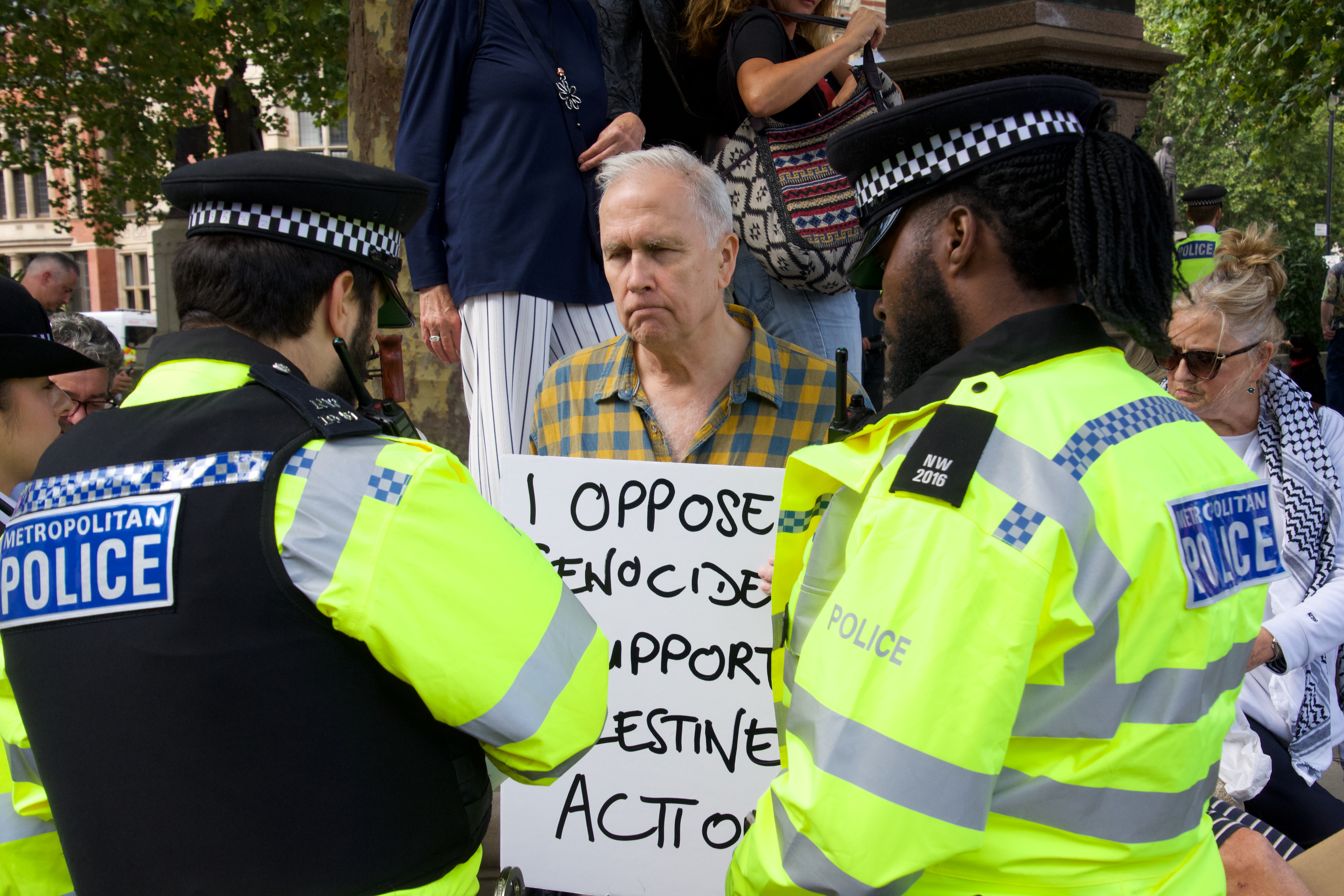
Metropolitan Police making arrests at a Palestine Action protest in London, 6 September 2025

Between July and December 2007, the BBC reported that more than 14,000 people and vehicles had been stopped and searched by British Transport Police in Scotland. In 2008 the Metropolitan Police conducted 175,000 searches using Section 44, these included over 2313 children (aged 15 or under), of whom 58 were aged under 10.

Up to early 2004, around 500 people are believed to have been arrested under the act; seven people had been charged. By October 2005 these figures had risen to 750 arrested with 22 convictions; the then current Home Secretary, Charles Clarke, said "the statistics illustrate the difficulty of getting evidence to bring prosecution".

Figures released by the Home Office on 5 March 2007 show that 1,126 people were arrested under the act between 11 September 2001 and 31 December 2006. Of the total 1,166 people arrested under the act or during related police investigations, 221 were charged with terrorism offences, and 40 convicted.

Noted arrests under Section 58 include Abu Bakr Mansha in December 2005, and the eight suspects involved in the 2004 financial buildings plot.

Following Palestine Action's break-in into RAF Brize Norton in June 2025, the Home Secretary, Yvette Cooper, introduced legislation in Parliament to proscribe it. On 9 August 2025, a large demonstration in support of the group was held at Parliament Square, during which hundreds of demonstrators held signs saying I oppose genocide. I support Palestine Action. The Metropolitan Police arrested 532 people, which was the largest number of arrests they had made on a single day in the previous 10 years.

== Reactions and analysis ==
In his comprehensive commentary on this Act and other anti-terrorism legislation, Professor Clive Walker of the University of Leeds comments:

The Terrorism Act 2000 represents a worthwhile attempt to fulfil the role of a modern code against terrorism, though it fails to meet the desired standards in all respects. There are aspects where rights are probably breached, and its mechanisms to ensure democratic accountability and constitutionalism are even more deficient, as discussed in the section on 'Scrutiny' earlier in this chapter. It is also a sobering thought, proffered by the Home Affairs Committee, that the result is that 'This country has more anti-terrorist legislation on its statute books than almost any other developed democracy.' (Report on the Anti-terrorism, Crime and Security Bill 2001 (2001–02 HC 351) para.1). But at least that result initially flowed from a solemnly studied and carefully constructed legislative exercise.

The Terrorism Act 2000 is subject to annual review by the Independent Reviewer of Terrorism Legislation. The Independent Reviewer's reports are submitted to the Home Secretary, laid before Parliament and published in full.

== Alleged abuses ==
The laws have been criticised for allowing excessive police powers leaving scope for abuse. There have been various cases in which the laws have been used in scenarios criticised for being unrelated to fighting terrorism. Critics allege there is systematic abuse of the act against protesters.

Many instances have been reported in the media of innocent people who have been stopped and searched under section 44 of the act. According to Home Office guidelines, police are required to have "reasonable suspicion" that a person is acting as a terrorist. Critics of the act claim that, in practice, police are using Section 44 emergency powers as "an additional tool in their day-to-day policing kit" to stop and search innocent citizens without reasonable grounds, going beyond the original intention of Parliament.

One of the issues arising from the Section 44 authorisations has been the use of the act to detain lawful protestors or other people who are in the vicinity of demonstrations. Critics claim the act gives police extended powers to deter or prevent peaceful protest.

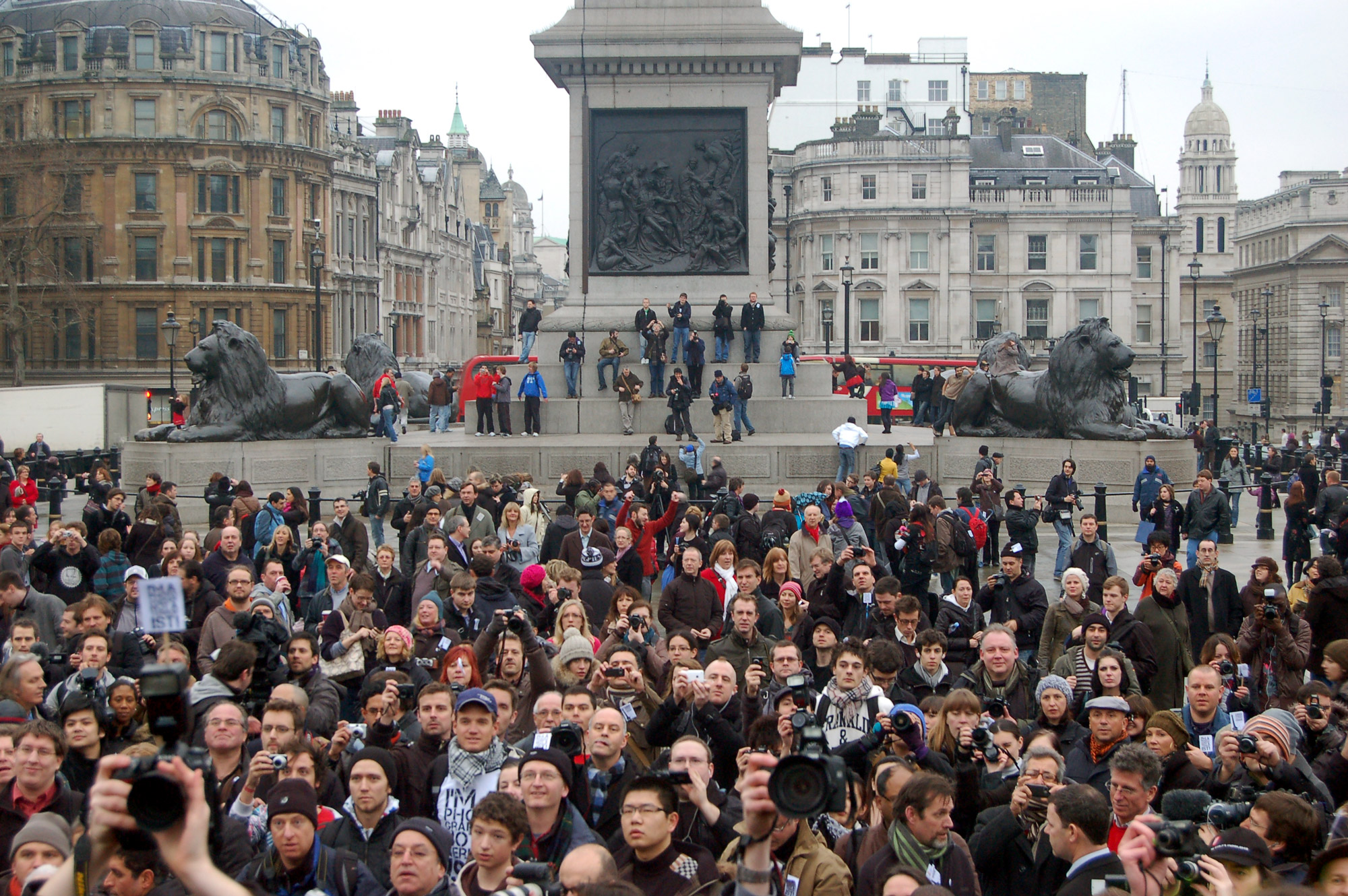
Protesters demonstrating against police harassment of photographers under Section 44. Trafalgar Square, London, 23 January 2010

Problematic use of Section 44 powers has not been restricted to political protestors; according to reports, journalists, amateur and professional photographers, trainspotters, politicians and children have been subject to stop and search under suspicion of being involved in terrorist activities while engaged in lawful acts such as photography. The taking of photographs in public spaces is permitted under the Copyright, Designs and Patents Act 1988 (freedom of panorama), and while the Terrorism Act does not prohibit such activity, critics have alleged misuse of the powers of the act to prevent lawful photography. Further restrictions on photography have, however, been introduced with the Counter-Terrorism Act 2008.

Disquiet among the police and government about Section 44 increased; in an interview on BBC Radio 4's programme iPM, Peter Smyth, chairman of the Metropolitan Police Federation, remarked that the act was not clear about police and that a lack of training for police officers had led to some officers being "overzealous" in implementing the act. Vernon Coaker, the Minister of State stated on 20 April 2009 that, "counter-terrorism measures should only be used for counter-terrorism purposes".

In December 2009, the Association of Chief Police Officers (ACPO) issued a warning to police chiefs to stop using Section 44 powers to target photographers, whether tourists, amateurs or professionals, stating that the practice was "unacceptable". As of 2011, the Section 44 powers effectively no longer exist (see above), and police must "reasonably" suspect an individual of involvement in terrorism before intervening.

=== Incidents ===
==== General ====
- In October 2005, Sally Cameron was held for four hours after being arrested under the act for walking on a cycle path in a controlled port area in Dundee owned by Forth Ports. While cyclists were free to pass through the port zone, she was arrested and detained because she was a pedestrian and under suspicion of being a terrorist.

I've been walking to work every morning for months and months to keep fit. One day, I was told by a guard on the gate that I couldn't use the route any more because it was solely a cycle path and he said, if I was caught doing it again, I'd be arrested...The next thing I knew, the harbour master had driven up behind me with a megaphone, saying, 'You're trespassing, please turn back'. It was totally ridiculous. I started laughing and kept on walking. Cyclists going past were also laughing...But then two police cars roared up beside me and cut me off, like a scene from Starsky and Hutch, and officers told me I was being arrested under the Terrorism Act. The harbour master was waffling on and (saying that), because of September 11, I would be arrested and charged.

- In July 2008, anti-terror police held a 12-year-old autistic boy with cerebral palsy and his parents whilst travelling on the Eurotunnel Shuttle rail service under Section 7 of the Terrorism Act. The child's mother was taken to an interrogation room and questioned on suspicion of child trafficking and released without charge. Kent Police later apologised for the incident.
- In August 2013, while travelling home from a visit to Germany, carrying work in progress relating to classified US government documents to Glenn Greenwald in Brazil, David Miranda, 28, was detained by the Metropolitan Police Service at London's Heathrow Airport under Schedule 7 of the Terrorism Act 2000.

==== Section 12 ====
- Journalist Richard Medhurst was arrested under section 12 in August 2024. His electronic devices were seized and he was ordered to surrender his passwords to allow police to gain access to the data on his devices. Medhurst refused to provide the passwords. His arrest was condemned by the National Union of Journalists and the International Federation of Journalists. Rebecca Vincent from Reporters Sans Frontières said the seizure of a journalist's equipment during an arrest "at best intimidates journalists working on sensitive topics, and at worst it compromises the protection of journalistic sources".
- In September 2024, Mohamad Al-Mail, a Kuwaiti national granted refugee status in the United Kingdom and founder of the Upper Hand Organisation, was arrested at a pro-Palestinian demonstration in Swiss Cottage, London, initially on suspicion of inciting racial hatred under the Public Order Act 1986. The arrest followed allegations that he chanted "I love an organisation that starts with H". He was subsequently further arrested on suspicion of supporting a proscribed organisation under Section 12 of the Terrorism Act 2000. The Crown Prosecution Service (CPS) declined to prosecute on two occasions due to insufficient evidence. In December 2025, following further police engagement with the CPS, Al-Mail was charged. The case drew attention to the interpretation of the chant, with Al-Mail claiming the "H" referred to the Home Office rather than to a proscribed organisation.
- In November 2024, anti-Zionist activist Tony Greenstein was charged with a terrorism offence under section 12(1), accused of supporting the proscribed organisation Hamas. The charges stemmed from social media comments posted by Greenstein on 7 October 2023, in which he expressed support for the "Gaza ghetto uprising". One post contained links to a blog post which stated "Whatever criticisms one can make of Hamas, we should congratulate them on this well planned and audacious attack on the Zionist enemy". During his trial in 2026 Greenstein said in his defence that he supported Hamas' actions against Israel but had consistently opposed it as an organisation, noting he had criticised Hamas in his more than 3,500 blog posts. Greenstein gave the closing speech to the jury himself, rather than relying on his barrister. The judge said she considered charging him with contempt of court following this speech. He was acquitted of the charge on 21 August 2026, with the jury finding him not guilty after just over two hours of deliberation.

==== Section 44 ====
Photographic subjects questioned under anti-terror laws

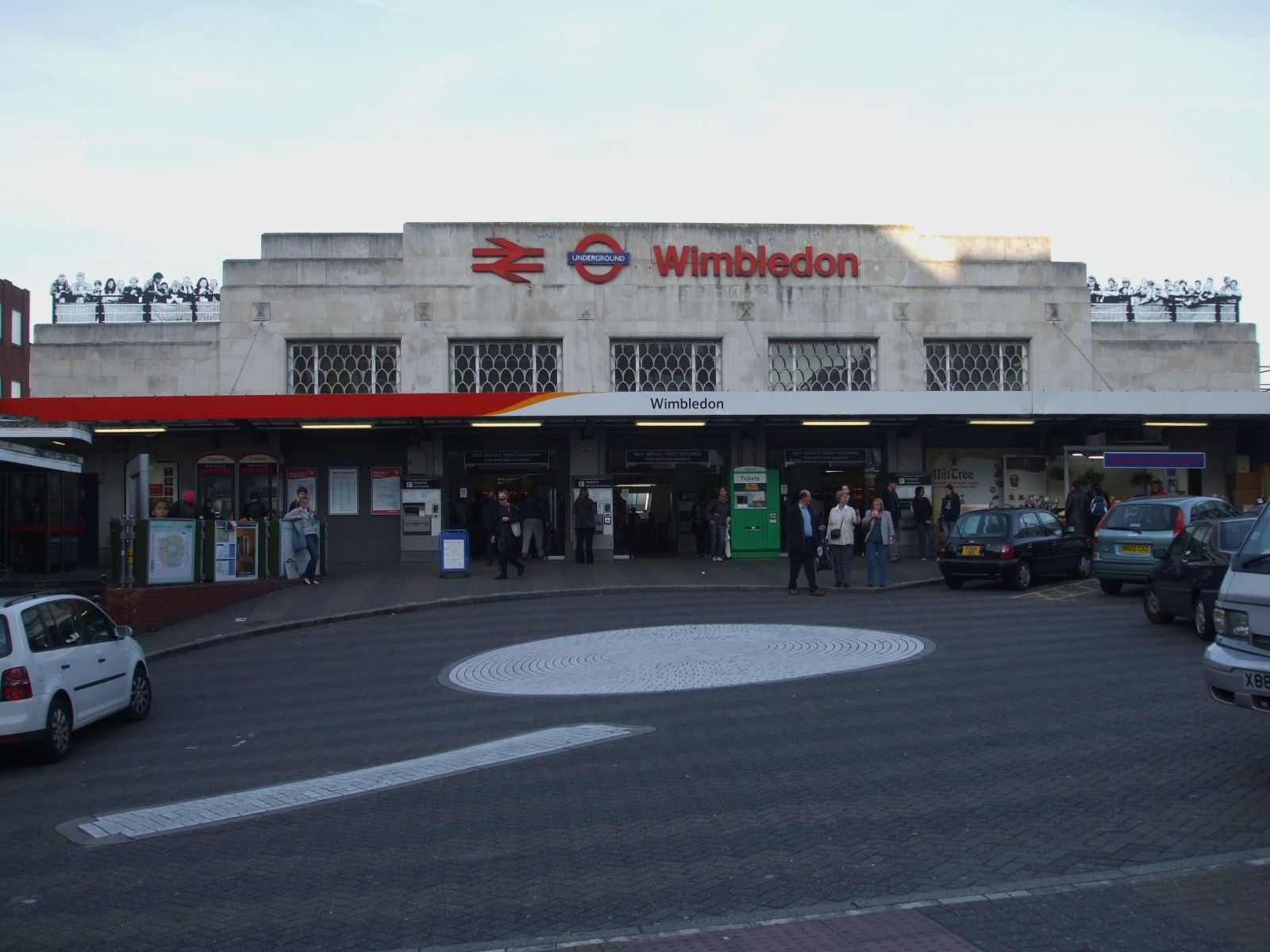
Wimbledon railway station

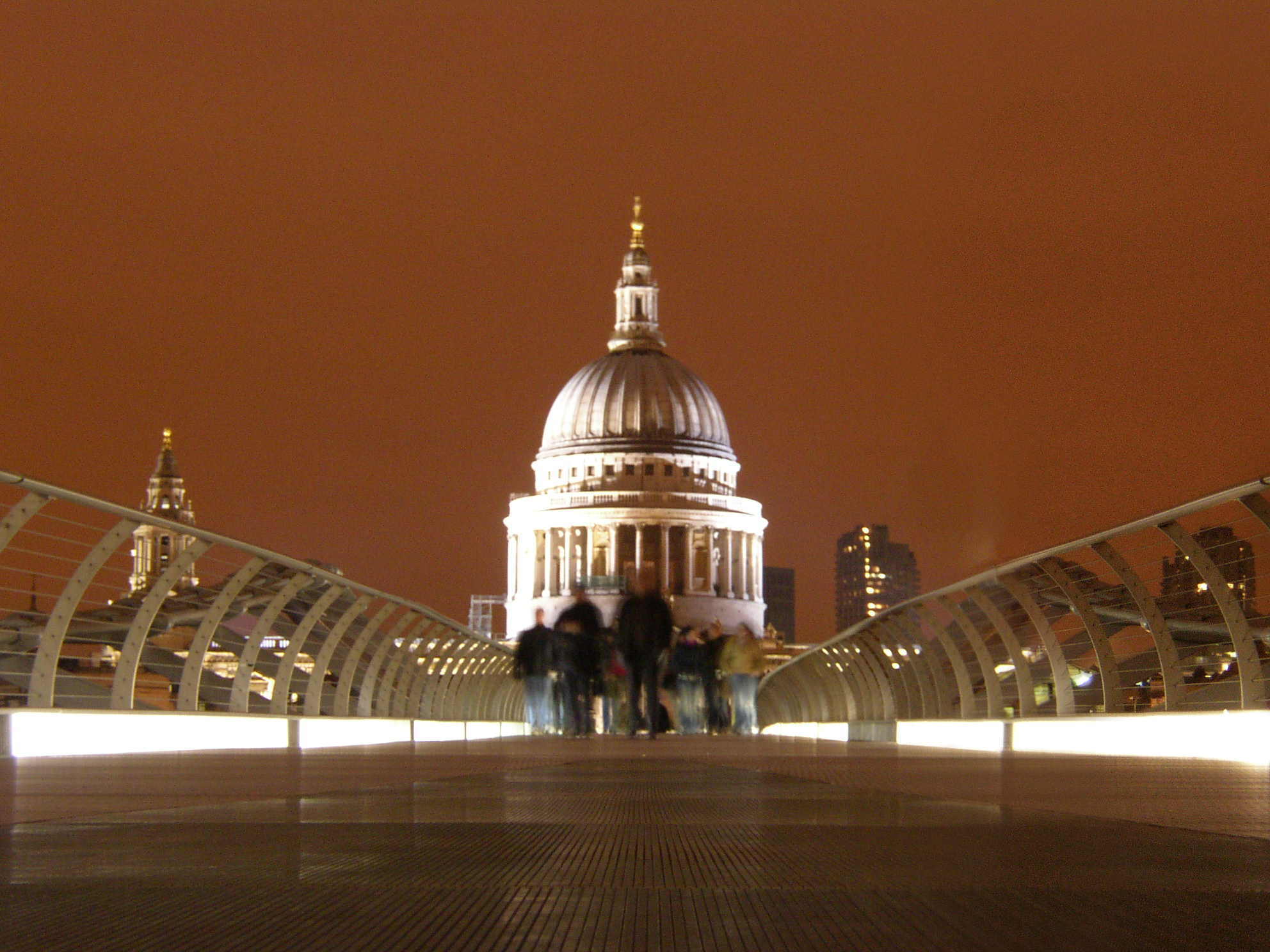
St Paul's Cathedral

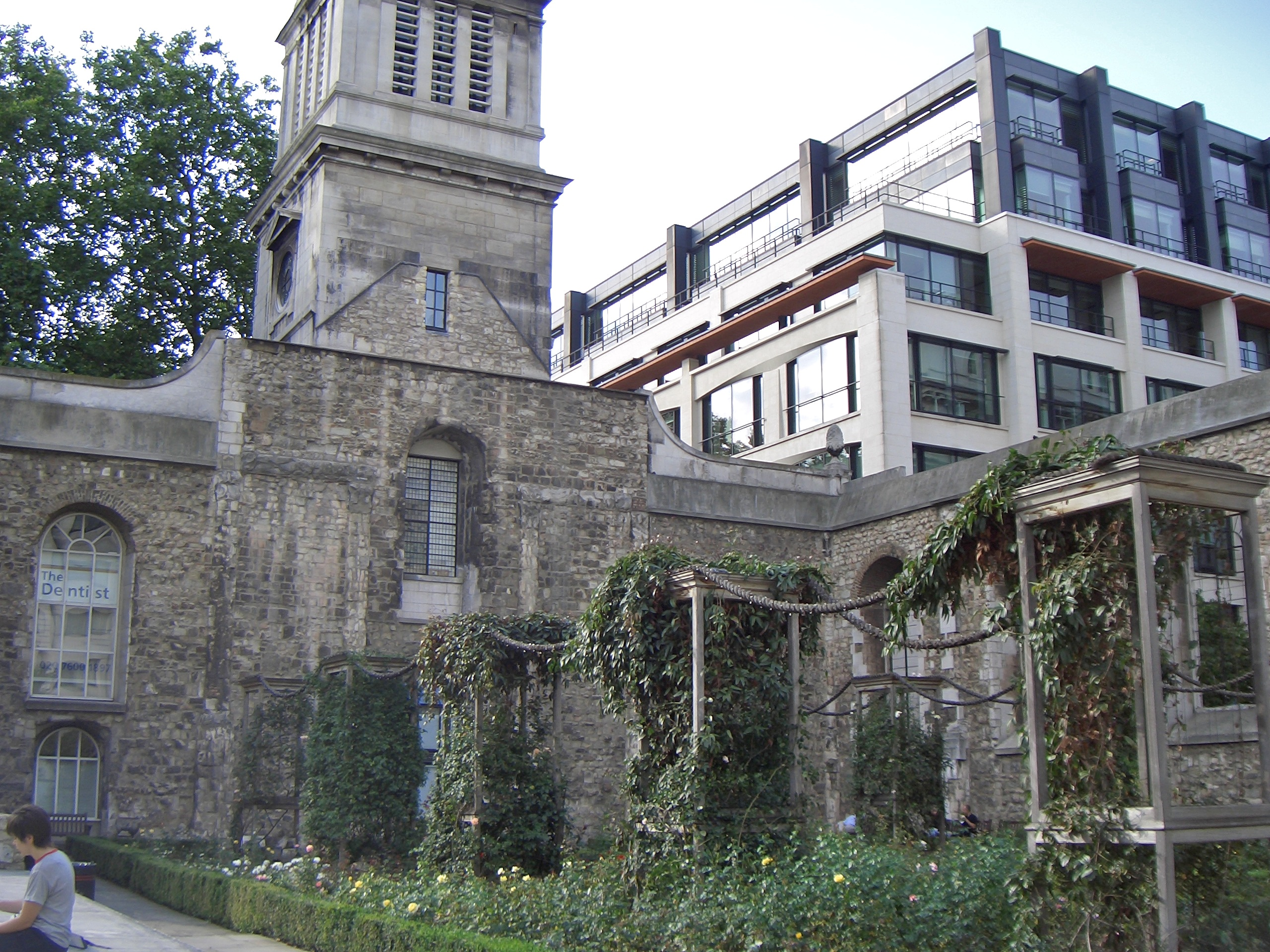
Christ Church Greyfriars

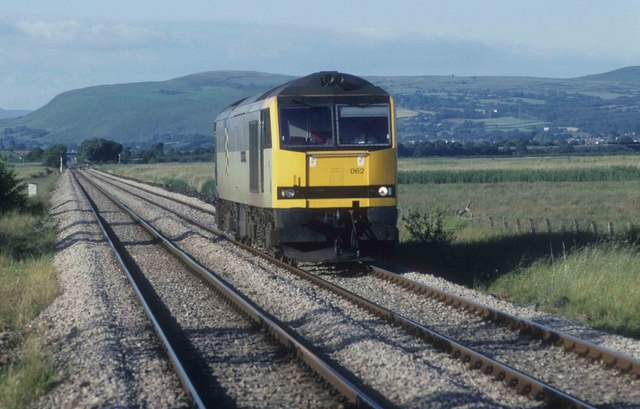
Railway locomotive, Milford Haven

- In September 2003, two people, Kevin Gillan and Pennie Quinton, intending to protest against the Defence Systems Equipment International (DSEI) show in London's Docklands, were stopped and searched under the act. Quinton, who is a journalist, was ordered by police to stop filming the protest. The pressure group Liberty took the case to High Court where the Judge ruled in favour of the police. Appeals to the Court of Appeal, and, in March 2006, to the House of Lords, failed. The case was then taken to the European Court of Human Rights, on the grounds of an alleged violation of Articles 5, 8, 10 and 11 of the European Convention on Human Rights. The court ruled that the stop-and-search powers of the police constituted a violation of the right to privacy.
- Walter Wolfgang, an 82-year-old from London, was removed from the 2005 Labour Party conference for heckling Jack Straw. Wolfgang had shouted that Straw's policy on Iraq was "nonsense." When Wolfgang tried to re-enter the conference, he was stopped by police under the Terrorism Act, but was not arrested. "The Terrorism Act was introduced by Tony Blair with the promise that it would be used only in the gravest of cases," James Ball complained in The Guardian in 2012, referencing Wolfgang's incident.
- Over 1,000 anti-war protesters were stopped and required to empty their pockets on their way to RAF Fairford (used by American B-52 bombers during the Iraq conflict).
- During the 2005 G8 protests in Auchterarder, Scotland, a cricketer on his way to a match was stopped at King's Cross station in London under Section 44 powers and questioned over his possession of a cricket bat.
- In October 2008, police stopped a 15-year-old schoolboy in south London who was taking photographs of Wimbledon railway station for his school geography project. He was questioned under suspicion of being a terrorist. His parents raised concerns that his personal data could be held on a police database for up to six years.
- In January 2009, Member of Parliament Andrew Pelling was questioned after photographing roadworks near a railway station
- In April 2009, a man in Enfield was questioned under Section 44 for photographing a police car that he considered was being driven inappropriately along a public footpath. The police claimed (incorrectly) that the act made it illegal to take photographs of police officers and vehicles.
- Trainspotters have frequently been subjected to stop and search. Between 2000 and 2009, police used powers under the act to stop 62,584 people at railway stations.
- In November 2009, BBC photographer Jeff Overs was searched and questioned by police outside the Tate Modern art gallery for photographing the sunset over St Paul's Cathedral, under suspicion of preparing for a terrorist act. Overs lodged a formal complaint with the Metropolitan Police.
- In December 2009, renowned architectural photographer Grant Smith was searched by a group of City of London Police officers under Section 44 because he was taking photographs of Christ Church Greyfriars; although he was working on public ground, the church's proximity to the Bank of America City of London branch caused a bank security guard to call the police.
- In June 2010, Metropolitan Police officers attempted to prevent a 15-year-old boy from photographing an Armed Forces Day parade in Romford, East London, citing "antisocial behaviour" and the Terrorism Act. A police misconduct hearing held in December 2011 found that the police had no legal power to prevent the teenager from taking pictures and that the police inspector involved in the incident had used abusive language in calling the boy "silly", "gay" and "stupid". The boy was awarded compensation and given an apology.
- In October 2011, a man was challenged by security staff in the Braehead Shopping Centre in Glasgow after taking photographs of his own four-year-old daughter eating an ice cream in the centre. He was held by Strathclyde Police under the Terrorism Act and eventually released without charge.

=== Schedule 7 ===
- Far-right political leader Paul Golding was arrested after visiting Russia in October 2019. Paul Golding refused to provide PIN codes to his phone and laptop at Heathrow Airport and so he was arrested at the airport and convicted in February 2020 with a Conditional Discharge for 9 months and ordered to pay £21 in Victim surcharge and £750 in costs.
- British journalist Kit Klarenberg, who works for The Grayzone, was detained at Luton airport on 17 May 2023. He was interrogated for over five hours about his reports on the British government and intelligence services, his work for The Grayzone and his opinions about the British government and Russia's invasion of Ukraine. His electronic devices, bank cards and memory cards were taken by police, who fingerprinted him, took DNA swabs, and photographed him. The National Union of Journalists expressed grave concern over his arrest.

== Amendments ==
Other than consequential amendments, the act was amended by the following enactments:

- Anti-terrorism, Crime and Security Act 2001
- Extradition Act 2003
- Crime (International Co-operation) Act 2003
- Criminal Justice (Northern Ireland) Order 2003
- Criminal Justice (Northern Ireland) Order 2004
- Terrorism Act 2006
- Terrorism (Northern Ireland) Act 2006
- Counter-Terrorism Act 2008
- Terrorism Act 2000 (Remedial) Order 2011
- Protection of Freedoms Act 2012 (repealing the sections 44 to 47 ruled incompatible with the Convention)
- Counter-Terrorism and Security Act 2015
- Criminal Finances Act 2017
- Counter-Terrorism and Border Security Act 2019
- Counter-Terrorism and Sentencing Act 2021
- Police, Crime, Sentencing and Courts Act 2022
- Economic Crime and Corporate Transparency Act 2023
- Crime and Policing Act 2026
- National Security (State Threats) Act 2026

Schedule 2, containing the list of proscribed organizations, is regularly amended from time to time to add or remove entries by statutory instruments made under powers conferred by section 3.

Schedule 3 has been amended by numerous statutory instruments under powers conferred under it.

== See also ==
- Terrorism Acts (since 2000)
- Human rights in the United Kingdom
- Walter Wolfgang – subject of an oft-quoted abuse of Section 44 of the Terrorism Act.
- Samina Malik – first woman convicted under the Terrorism Act.
- Rizwaan Sabir – Postgraduate student arrested and detained for 6 days under Section 41 of the Terrorism Act
- Proscribed Organisations Appeal Commission
- Photography and the law – issues arising around the taking of photographs
- Censorship in the United Kingdom
- List of designated terrorist groups
- United States Department of State list of Foreign Terrorist Organizations
