= Counter-Terrorism Act 2008 =

Act of the Parliament of the United Kingdom

Counter-Terrorism Act 2008 (Note: Section 102.)
- Act of Parliament
- Parliament of the United Kingdom
- Long title: An Act to confer further powers to gather and share information for counter-terrorism and other purposes; to make further provision about the detention and questioning of terrorist suspects and the prosecution and punishment of terrorist offences; to impose notification requirements on persons convicted of such offences; to confer further powers to act against terrorist financing, money laundering and certain other activities; to provide for review of certain Treasury decisions and about evidence in, and other matters connected with, review proceedings; to amend the law relating to inquiries; to amend the definition of "terrorism"; to amend the enactments relating to terrorist offences, control orders and the forfeiture of terrorist cash; to provide for recovering the costs of policing at certain gas facilities; to amend provisions about the appointment of special advocates in Northern Ireland; and for connected purposes.
- Citation: 2008 c. 28
- Territorial extent: United Kingdom (Note: Section 101.)

Dates
- Royal assent: 26 November 2008
- Commencement: Various (Note: Section 100.)
Other legislation
Amends	Senior Courts Act 1981; Police and Criminal Evidence Act 1984; Criminal Evidence (Northern Ireland) Order 1988; Police and Criminal Evidence (Northern Ireland) Order 1989; Criminal Justice and Public Order Act 1994; Proceeds of Crime (Northern Ireland) Order 1996; Special Immigration Appeals Commission Act 1997; Northern Ireland Act Tribunal (Procedure) Rules 1999; Financial Services and Markets Act 2000; Terrorism Act 2000; Regulation of Investigatory Powers Act 2000; Representation of the People (England and Wales) Regulations 2001; Representation of the People (Scotland) Regulations 2001; Anti-terrorism, Crime and Security Act 2001; Terrorism (United Nations Measures) (Channel Islands) Order 2001; Terrorism (United Nations Measures) (Isle of Man) Order 2001; Terrorism (United Nations Measures) (Overseas Territories) Order 2001; Proceeds of Crime Act 2002; Anti-terrorism (Financial and Other Measures) (Overseas Territories) Order 2002; Criminal Justice Act 2003; Prevention of Terrorism Act 2005; Terrorism Act 2006; Immigration, Asylum and Nationality Act 2006; Terrorism (United Nations Measures) Order 2006; Statistics and Registration Service Act 2007; See § Repealed enactments
Amended by	Revenue and Customs Appeals Order 2009; Transfer of Functions of the Consumer Credit Appeals Tribunal Order 2009; Financial Restrictions Proceedings (UN Terrorism Orders) Order 2009; Criminal Justice and Licensing (Scotland) Act 2010; Crime and Security Act 2010; Transfer of Tribunal Functions Order 2010; Terrorist Asset-Freezing etc. Act 2010; Northern Ireland Act 1998 (Devolution of Policing and Justice Functions) Order 2010; Al-Qaida and Taliban (Asset-Freezing) Regulations 2010; Iran (European Union Financial Sanctions) Regulations 2010; Terrorism Prevention and Investigation Measures Act 2011; Electronic Money Regulations 2011; Libya (Asset-Freezing) Regulations 2011; Afghanistan (Asset-Freezing) Regulations 2011; Al-Qaida (Asset-Freezing) Regulations 2011; Protection of Freedoms Act 2012; Legal Aid, Sentencing and Punishment of Offenders Act 2012; Financial Services Act 2012; Iran (European Union Financial Sanctions) Regulations 2012; Crime and Courts Act 2013; Police and Fire Reform (Scotland) Act 2012 (Consequential Provisions and Modifications) Order 2013; Financial Services and Markets Act 2000 (Regulated Activities) (Amendment) (No.2) Order 2013; Capital Requirements Regulations 2013; Anti-social Behaviour, Crime and Policing Act 2014; Co-operative and Community Benefit Societies Act 2014; Public Bodies (Merger of the Director of Public Prosecutions and the Director of Revenue and Customs Prosecutions) Order 2014; Justice Act (Northern Ireland) 2015; Investigatory Powers Act 2016; Iran (European Union Financial Sanctions) Regulations 2016; Al-Qaida (Asset-Freezing) (Amendment) Regulations 2016; Policing and Crime Act 2017; Money Laundering, Terrorist Financing and Transfer of Funds (Information on the Payer) Regulations 2017; Financial Services and Markets Act 2000 (Markets in Financial Instruments) Regulations 2017; Space Industry Act 2018; Data Protection Act 2018; Sanctions and Anti-Money Laundering Act 2018; Counter-Terrorism and Border Security Act 2019; Sentencing Act 2020; Counter-Terrorism and Sentencing Act 2021; Armed Forces Act 2021; Financial Services Act 2021 (Prudential Regulation of Credit Institutions and Investment Firms) (Consequential Amendments and Miscellaneous Provisions) Regulations 2021; Police, Crime, Sentencing and Courts Act 2022; Criminal Justice Act 2003 (Commencement No. 33) and Sentencing Act 2020 (Commencement No. 2) Regulations 2022; Financial Services Act 2021 (Prudential Regulation of Credit Institutions and Investment Firms) (Consequential Amendments and Miscellaneous Provisions) Regulations 2022; Energy Act 2023; Judicial Review and Courts Act 2022 (Magistrates' Court Sentencing Powers) Regulations 2023; National Security Act 2023 (Consequential Amendments of Primary Legislation) Regulations 2023; Insurance Distribution (Regulated Activities and Miscellaneous Amendments) Regulations 2024; Data (Use and Access) Act 2025; Crime and Policing Act 2026

Status: Amended

History of passage through Parliament

Text of statute as originally enacted

Revised text of statute as amended

The Counter-Terrorism Act 2008 (c. 28) is an act of the Parliament of the United Kingdom which increased police powers for the stated purpose of countering terrorism. The first reading of the bill was held in January 2008, and it received royal assent on 26 November 2008 following an episode of Parliamentary ping-pong on some of its most controversial issues.

== Provisions ==
The act as passed contains various notable provisions:

- Removal of the prohibition on post-charge questioning.
- Longer terrorism sentences.
- A register and monitoring for those convicted of terrorism related offences, similar to the Violent and Sex Offender Register.
- Changes to some of the rules surrounding the use of "intercept evidence".
- Powers to seize the assets of convicted terrorists.
- Police will be able to remove documents from a property search to decide whether or not they need to be legally seized as part of an investigation.
- Greater use of DNA samples, and powers to allow the police to take fingerprints or DNA from those subject to a control order.

=== Repealed enactments ===
Section 99 of the act repealed 7 enactments and revoked 6 instruments, listed in schedule 9 to the act.

Part 1 – Retention and use of fingerprints and samples
Citation	Short title	Extent of repeal
2000 c. 11	Terrorism Act 2000	In Schedule 8, paragraph 14(3).

Part 2 – Disclosure of information and the intelligence services
Citation	Short title	Extent of repeal or revocation
2001 c. 24	Anti-terrorism, Crime and Security Act 2001	Section 19(2)(a).
SI 2001/341	Representation of the People (England and Wales) Regulations 2001	Regulation 45E(3) and (4).
SI 2001/341	Representation of the People (England and Wales) Regulations 2001	In Regulation 109— (a) paragraph (1)(g) to (i); (b) in paragraph (4)(a), the words preceding paragraph (i); (c) paragraph (4)(b) and the word "and" immediately preceding it.
SI 2001/341	Representation of the People (England and Wales) Regulations 2001	In Regulation 115(2), "45E(3),".
SI 2001/497	Representation of the People (Scotland) Regulations 2001	Regulation 45D(3) and (4).
SI 2001/497	Representation of the People (Scotland) Regulations 2001	In Regulation 108— (a) paragraph (1)(g) to (i); (b) in paragraph (4)(a), the words preceding paragraph (i); (c) paragraph (4)(b) and the word "and" immediately preceding it.
SI 2001/497	Representation of the People (Scotland) Regulations 2001	In Regulation 115(2), "45D(3),".
2006 c. 13	Immigration, Asylum and Nationality Act 2006	Section 38.
2007 c. 18	Statistics and Registration Service Act 2007	Section 39(4)(g).
2007 c. 18	Statistics and Registration Service Act 2007	In section 67, the definition of "Intelligence Service".

Part 3 – Forfeiture
Citation	Short title	Extent of repeal
2000 c. 11	Terrorism Act 2000	Section 54(7) to (9).
2000 c. 11	Terrorism Act 2000	Section 58(5) to (7).

Part 4 – Financial restrictions proceedings
Citation	Title	Extent of revocation
SI 2001/3365	Terrorism (United Nations Measures) Order 2001	Article 4(7) and (8).
SI 2002/111	Al-Qa'ida and Taliban (United Nations Measures) Order 2002	Article 8(7) and (8).
SI 2006/2657	Terrorism (United Nations Measures) Order 2006	Article 5(4) and (5).
SI 2006/2952	Al-Qaida and Taliban (United Nations Measures) Order 2006	Article 5(4) and (5).

These revocations do not affect an application made before the commencement of section 63 of the act.

Part 5 – Control orders
Citation	Short title	Extent of repeal
2005 c. 2	Prevention of Terrorism Act 2005	In section 3— (a) subsection (1)(c); (b) in subsection (7) the words "within 7 days of the court's giving permission or (as the case may be) making its determination on the reference".
2005 c. 2	Prevention of Terrorism Act 2005	Section 8(8).
2005 c. 2	Prevention of Terrorism Act 2005	In the Schedule, in paragraph 5(1)(a) the words ", at any time after a control order has been made,".

Part 6 – Pre-charge detention
Citation	Short title	Extent of repeal
2000 c. 11	Terrorism Act 2000	In Schedule 8, in paragraph 29(4)(a) and (c), the words "after consulting the Lord Chancellor".

== Photographs of police officers in public places ==
Section 76 (Offences relating to information about members of armed forces etc.) came into force on 15 February 2009 making it an offence to elicit, attempt to elicit, or publish information "of a kind likely to be useful to a person committing or preparing an act of terrorism" about:

- a member of Her Majesty's Armed Forces,
- a constable,
- the Security Service,
- the Secret Intelligence Service, or
- Government Communications Headquarters.

Any person found guilty faces up to 10 years imprisonment and an unlimited fine. It is a defence for a person charged with this offence to prove that they had a reasonable excuse for their action (for example, a newspaper feature on police brutality or corruption).

There are exemptions for communications service providers, web caches and web hosting services.

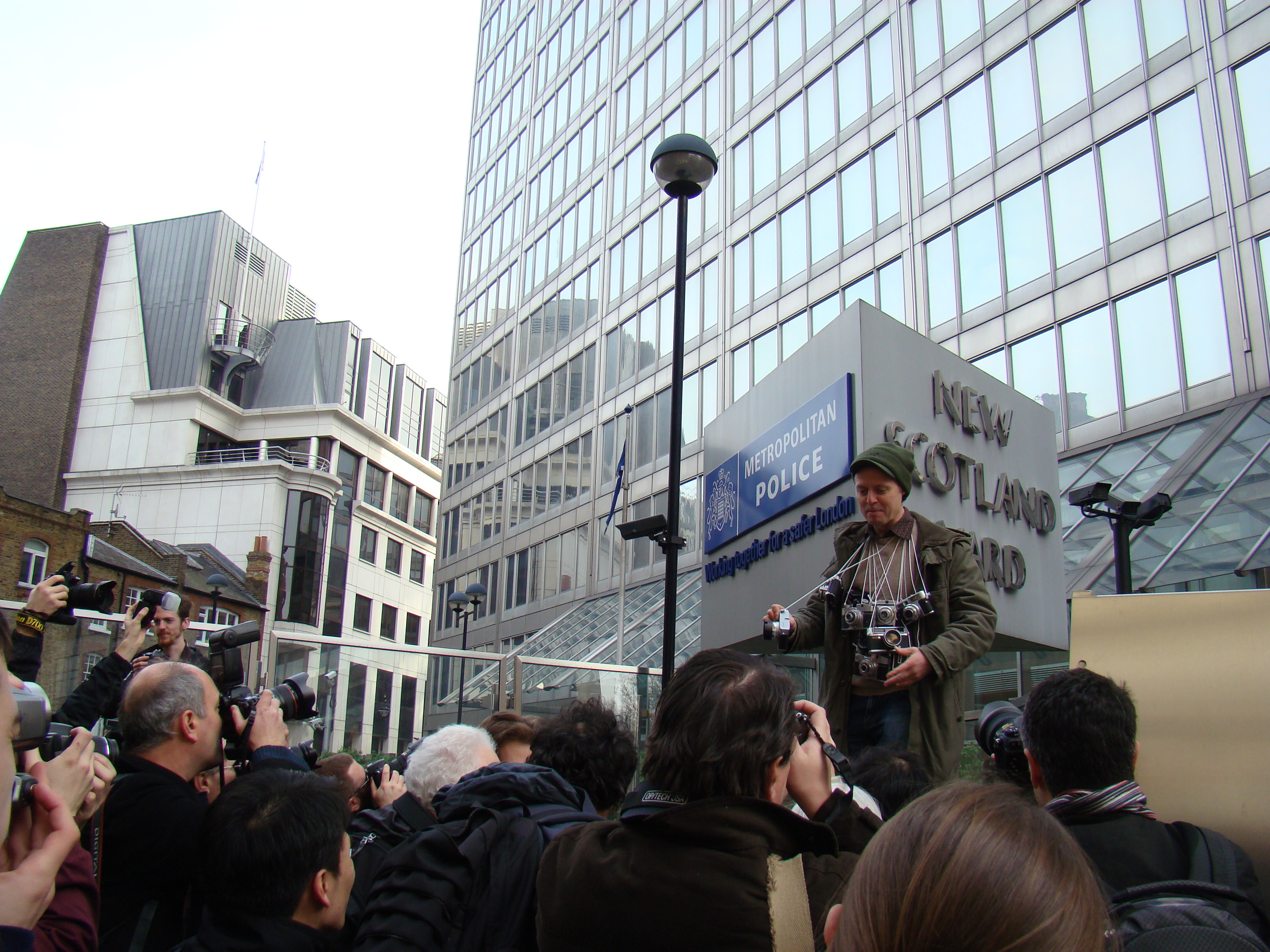
The protest outside New Scotland Yard, February 2009

Journalists who feared that this law would be abused by the police to threaten the taking of photographs of their activities staged a mass protest outside Scotland Yard in February 2009. Gordon Brown reaffirmed that the police have a legal right to restrict photography in public places, and stated "the law applies to photographers as it does to anybody else in a public place". The act however does not lay out restrictions for the photography of Community Support Officers as they do not hold the office of Constable.

The parliamentary debate on this law was limited because in earlier versions of the bill the offence of eliciting or publishing information "likely to be useful to a person committing or preparing an act of terrorism" only applied to people who were or had been members of Her Majesty's Forces, and not to the police. This was also the case throughout the debate in the Standing Committee.

An opposition amendment changing the phrase "of a kind likely to be useful to a person committing or preparing an act of terrorism" with the words "with the intention that it is useful..." was withdrawn after the Minister explained that the clause merely restated earlier laws applying to the armed forces on which there was already case law that made it more reasonable than it appeared.

The law against eliciting or publishing information "likely to be useful to a person committing or preparing an act of terrorism" was extended to encompass police constables in a raft of unscrutinized amendments that passed into the Bill at the end of the debate when the Parliamentary timetable (which had been voted on earlier in the day) expired.

When this clause was scrutinized in the House of Lords, and in all subsequent debates, no reference was made to the extension of the law to include police constables.

A parliamentary written question about the policy regarding police preventing members of the public from taking photographs in public places hasn't been answered. But the Home Office issued a circular to the police in 2009 which reminds them that 'Legitimate journalistic activity (such as covering a demonstration for a newspaper) is likely to constitute such an excuse. Similarly an innocent tourist or other sight-seer taking a photograph of a police officer is likely to have a reasonable excuse.'

== Post-charge questioning ==
A number of measures were linked to the debate about extending the detention period for those arrested under the Terrorism Act 2000. One of them was the introduction of questioning after charge under ss. 22 to 27. Such questioning was already exceptionally allowed under PACE Code C para.16 in order: to prevent or minimise harm or loss to some other person, or the public; to clear up an ambiguity in a previous answer or statement; in the interests of justice for the detainee to have put to them, and have an opportunity to comment on, information concerning the offence which has come to light since they were charged or informed they might be prosecuted. But post-charge questioning rarely happens in practice. However, in order to give the police and prosecutors confidence that they do not have to wait until the end of the detention period to make a charge, the 2008 Act allows them to resume questioning after charge. This idea may be especially important if a charge is made under the Threshold Test under the Code for Crown Prosecutors, 2010, para.5. These measures are not likely to have much impact since they involve dire problems of admissibility, given the circumstances of a pending trial which is meant to be controlled by a judge rather than the police. More likely, the police will seek adverse inferences from silence rather than responses to lengthy questioning.

== Terrorism connection ==
The concept of a "terrorism connection" was first introduced in section 30 of the Act, under which a court sentencing an offender for certain offences must consider whether the offence had a "terrorism connection".

A terrorism connection may be found where the offence was, or took place in the course of, an act of terrorism, or was committed for the purposes of terrorism. The test therefore relies on the definition of terrorism in section 1 of the Terrorism Act 2000, including action involving serious violence, serious damage to property, serious risk to public safety, or serious interference with an electronic system, where the remaining statutory elements are satisfied.

A finding of terrorism connection is treated as a statutory aggravating factor and may also trigger terrorism-related ancillary consequences, including notification requirements.

Subsequent to the Act being passed, Section 30 was invoked in sentencing on a number of occasions when the offences themselves were not covered by the Terrorism Act 2000, but where a "terrorism connection" was applied in cases of violent crimes where the perpetrators were motivated by ideological causes:

- 2017 Parsons Green train bombing
- 2020 Reading stabbings
- 2021 Murder of David Amess
- 2023 St Mary's Hospital Leeds attack
- 2023 Hartlepool knife murder
- 2024 Neo-Nazi stabbing
- 2024 Russia-backed arson attack

Section 69 of the Sentencing Act 2020 updated the "terrorism connection" criteria and the following year the Counter-Terrorism and Sentencing Act 2021 expanded the sentencing regime by requiring courts to consider terrorist connection findings for a wider range of non-terrorism offences punishable by more than two years' imprisonment, unless expressly excluded.

Public scrutiny of Section 69 increased during 2026 following its application in sentencing three of the defendants in the Filton protest case, who had been convicted of one count of criminal damage.

Scrutiny further increased in July 2026 when the judge in a case involving five defendants accused of breaking windows and throwing red paint over a branch of Barclays Bank in Lancashire announced that he too would be considering a "terrorism connection" in sentencing. Human rights lawyers denounced the step as "unfair" given that none of the defendants had been prosecuted on the basis of their being a "terrorism connection", and the announcement was only made by the judge after a guilty verdict had been returned.

== Abandoned provisions ==
=== 42 day terrorist detention without charge ===
The highest profile provision in the Counter-Terrorism Bill was a measure to allow terrorist suspects to be detained by police in England and Wales for up to 42 days before being charged (formally told what law they were accused of breaking). This was a re-run of 90-day terrorist detention without charge debate that occurred in 2006 that was narrowly lost by a vote in Parliament.

The crunch vote on the issue occurred on 11 June 2008 with a 36 Labour MP rebellion that would have defeated the government had the Democratic Unionist Party block, who normally vote with the Conservative Party, not voted for it. Allegations of a political bribe for these votes were denied.

The day after the vote, the Conservative front bench Home Affairs spokesman, David Davis suddenly resigned from Parliament in protest and won re-election to his seat in by-election in which none of the other main parties stood a candidate.

On 13 October 2008 this measure was dropped from the Bill by a vote in the House of Lords.

Rather than reverse this defeat with another difficult vote in the House of Commons, the Government drafted a Counter-Terrorism (Temporary Provisions) Bill that would stand "ready to be introduced if and when the need arises."

=== Secret coroner's inquests ===
A provision in the Bill to give the Government powers to certify that a coroner's inquest should be held in secret without a jury in the interests of national security or foreign relations raised enough opposition outside of Parliament that the measure was also dropped. These measures, however, reappeared in the Coroners and Justice Act 2009.

== See also ==
- Counter-Terrorism and Security Act 2015
