= Protection of Freedoms Act 2012 =

Act of the Parliament of the United Kingdom

Protection of Freedoms Act 2012 (Note: Section 121.)
- Act of Parliament
- Parliament of the United Kingdom
- Long title: An Act to provide for the destruction, retention, use and other regulation of certain evidential material; to impose consent and other requirements in relation to certain processing of biometric information relating to children; to provide for a code of practice about surveillance camera systems and for the appointment and role of the Surveillance Camera Commissioner; to provide for judicial approval in relation to certain authorisations and notices under the Regulation of Investigatory Powers Act 2000; to provide for the repeal or rewriting of powers of entry and associated powers and for codes of practice and other safeguards in relation to such powers; to make provision about vehicles left on land; to amend the maximum detention period for terrorist suspects; to replace certain stop and search powers and to provide for a related code of practice; to make provision about the safeguarding of vulnerable groups and about criminal records including provision for the establishment of the Disclosure and Barring Service and the dissolution of the Independent Safeguarding Authority; to disregard convictions and cautions for certain abolished offences; to make provision about the release and publication of datasets held by public authorities and to make other provision about freedom of information and the Information Commissioner; to make provision about the trafficking of people for exploitation and about stalking; to repeal certain enactments; and for connected purposes.
- Citation: 2012 c. 9
- Introduced by: Theresa May (Commons)
- Territorial extent: England and Wales; Scotland; Northern Ireland; (Note: Section 119.)

Dates
- Royal assent: 1 May 2012
- Commencement: Various (Note: Section 120.)
Other legislation
| Amends | Hypnotism Act 1952; House of Commons Disqualification Act 1975; Public Health (Control of Disease) Act 1984; Police and Criminal Evidence Act 1984; Airports Act 1986; Criminal Justice Act 1988; Criminal Procedure (Scotland) Act 1995; Police Act 1996; Terrorism Act 2000; Anti-terrorism, Crime and Security Act 2001; Asylum and Immigration (Treatment of Claimants, etc.) Act 2004; National Health Service Act 2006; National Health Service (Wales) Act 2006; Safeguarding Vulnerable Groups Act 2006; Serious Crime Act 2007; Counter-Terrorism Act 2008; Crime and Security Act 2010; Constitutional Reform and Governance Act 2010; Terrorism Prevention and Investigation Measures Act 2011 |
| Amended by | Crime and Courts Act 2013; Northern Ireland (Miscellaneous Provisions) Act 2014; Modern Slavery Act 2015; Investigatory Powers Act 2016; Social Services and Well-being (Wales) Act 2014 (Consequential Amendments) Regulations 2016; Policing and Crime Act 2017; Wales Act 2017; Data Protection Act 2018; Counter-Terrorism and Border Security Act 2019; Police, Crime, Sentencing and Courts Act 2022; Curriculum and Assessment (Wales) Act 2021 (Consequential Amendments) (Primary Legislation) Regulations 2022; National Security Act 2023; Protection of Freedoms Act 2012 (Definition of Relevant Land) (Amendment) Order 2025 |

Status: Amended

History of passage through Parliament

Text of statute as originally enacted

Text of the Protection of Freedoms Act 2012 as in force today (including any amendments) within the United Kingdom, from legislation.gov.uk.

The Protection of Freedoms Act 2012 (c. 9) is an act of the Parliament of the United Kingdom.

As the Protection of Freedoms Bill, it was introduced in February 2011, by the Home Secretary, Theresa May. The bill was sponsored by the Home Office. On Tuesday, 1 May 2012, the Protection of Freedoms Bill completed its passage through Parliament and received royal assent.

== History ==
The concept developed from the Great Repeal Bill proposed in 2008 by Conservative Party representatives Douglas Carswell MP and Daniel Hannan MEP as part of a radical "Twelve months to renew Britain". Following the 2010 general election, the Conservatives and Liberal Democrats formed a coalition government whose agreed programme initially promised a Freedom (Great Repeal) Bill or "a Freedom or Great Repeal Bill", "Freedom" being the Liberal Democrats' preferred title, "Great Repeal" the Conservatives'. The ensuing Queen's Speech referred to "A Freedom or Great Repeal Bill" which:

would address concerns around what has been described as a tidal wave of criminal justice legislation in recent years. It also provides an opportunity to strengthen the accountability of bodies receiving public funding in light of lessons learnt so far from the operation of the Freedom of Information Act.

The programme was later changed to refer to a Freedom Bill. After the Protection of Freedoms Bill was introduced in 2011, critics claimed it was piecemeal, incoherent, and too focused on protection from public-sector intrusion without sufficient focus on private-sector intrusion. Nick Clegg said, "There may even be a great repeal act down the road that would look at some of the laws not addressed in this bill."

In 2011, Jonathan Djanogly said in answer to a parliamentary question that a Repeals Bill would be a separate civil liberties measure from "the abolition of ID cards; the Protection of Freedoms Bill; and the Your Freedom public engagement exercise which took place over the summer".

== Part 1: Regulation of biometric data ==
Chapter 1 makes provision in respect of the destruction, retention, and use of fingerprints, footwear impressions and DNA samples. In addition it covers profiles taken in the course of a criminal investigation. Under the new scheme provided for in this Chapter, the fingerprints and DNA profiles taken from persons arrested for or charged with a minor offence will be destroyed following either acquittal or a decision not to charge.

This Part amends or omits Sections from the Police and Criminal Evidence Act 1984 and Crime and Security Act 2010 relating to the retention of fingerprints.

- Section 20 of Chapter 1 instructs the Secretary of State to appoint a Commissioner, to be known as the Commissioner for the Retention and Use of Biometric Material, to review the use and retention of biometrics by the government
- Section 24 of Chapter 1 instructs the Secretary of State to make arrangements for a "National DNA Database Strategy Board" to oversee the operation of a DNA database.
- Chapter 2 requires schools and colleges to obtain consent of one parent of a child under 18 for acquiring and processing the child's biometric information and gives the child rights to stop the processing of their biometric information regardless of any parental consent. It also states that processing of biometric information it must be discontinued if any parent of the child objects.

== Part 2: Regulation of surveillance ==
Chapter 1 creates new regulation for, and instructs the Secretary of State to prepare a code of practice towards closed-circuit television and automatic number plate recognition. Chapter 2 amends the Regulation of Investigatory Powers Act 2000.

== Part 3: Protection of property from disproportionate enforcement action ==
Chapter 1 reforms and repeals aspects of the powers to enter land and to review existing powers of entry legislation. It would implement restrictions as to the premises over which the power may be exercised, who can exercise them, and which conditions can be satisfied for them to be exercised.

Chapter 2 makes it a criminal offence for a private person on private or public land to immobilise a vehicle (e.g. by clamping or obstructing), or to move a vehicle, with a view to denying the owner access to it. Section 99 of the Road Traffic Regulation Act 1984 is amended to extend and amend the powers of public authorities to move vehicles parked obstructively, illegally, or dangerously, including on private land. However, clamping is still permitted where an Act of Parliament or byelaw permits the practice, such as the Railway Byelaws.

Clamping of vehicles and provisions relating to charging registered keepers of vehicles where a contract has been entered into with landowners or their agents is dealt with by sections 54-56 and Schedule 4 of the Act. These would have the effect of making it possible for private landowners and their agents to attempt to recover unpaid parking charges on private land (providing certain conditions are met) from the registered keeper of a vehicle in cases where it is not known who was driving at the time of the parking charge notice being issued. Paragraph 3 defines "relevant land" as excluding highways maintainable at the public expense (within the meaning of section 329(1) of the Highways Act 1980). Under the original wording of the Bill as introduced, clamping would be unlawful on private car-parks unless entrances are barriered. However, Clause 54 was amended at Report stage in the House of Commons such that clamping would be unlawful regardless of the existence of a barrier.

== Part 4: Counter-terrorism powers ==
Clause 57 reduces the pre-detention of terrorist suspects to a maximum of 14 days. Previously, it was 28 days after being extended from 14 days by the Terrorism Act 2006.

This Part removes the 'stop and search' regulations of the Terrorism Act 2000 and reforms the operation of the power to search people and vehicles, in addition to creating new Code of Practice rules in respect of these powers.

== Part 5: Safeguarding vulnerable groups, criminal records etc. ==
- Chapters 1 and 2 amend the Safeguarding Vulnerable Groups Act 2006 and Police Act 1997 with regards to carers and criminal record checks. The Act removed the Controlled Activity and Monitoring sections from the Safeguarding of Vulnerable Groups Act.
- Chapter 3 created a new body corporate, called the Disclosure and Barring Service, which merged the functions of the Independent Safeguarding Authority and Criminal Records Bureau.
- Chapter 4 allows people to apply for the Secretary of State to disregard criminal convictions for homosexual acts by consenting adults under section 12 of the Sexual Offences Act 1956, or the "gross indecency between men" section of that Act. Section 96 confirms that the effect of a successful application would ensure the person is considered as having not committed, nor been charged, prosecuted or convicted of a homosexual act.

== Part 6: Freedom of information and data protection ==
- This part extends the existing Freedom of Information Act 2000, extending the scope of the Act and amending the role of the Information Commissioner. This includes widening the rules on applying for and receiving datasets from public authorities for re-use.

== Part 7: Miscellaneous and general ==
- Section 109 amended the Sexual Offences Act 2003 to update its provisions relating to trafficking for sexual exploitation
- Section 113 repealed section 43 of the Criminal Justice Act 2003 which makes provision for trials on indictment to be conducted without a jury in certain fraud cases. Sections 44-50 of that Act, which make provision for trials on indictment to be conducted without a jury where there is a danger of jury tampering, were not affected.
- Section 114 repealed the restrictions that prohibit solemnizing marriages and civil partnerships during evenings and at night. Since the Marriage Act 1836, it had been forbidden to marry between the hours of six in the evening and eight in the morning.
