= List of acts of the Parliament of the United Kingdom from 2010 =

This is a list of acts of the Parliament of the United Kingdom passed in 2010.

Acts passed since 1963 are cited by calendar year, as opposed to the convention used for earlier acts of citing the regnal year(s) in which the relevant parliamentary session was held. Each act passed in a respective year is given a chapter number (abbreviated "c."), denoted by Arabic numerals in the case of public general acts, lowercase Roman numerals in the case of local acts, or italicised Arabic numerals in the case of personal acts. These run as separate series.

46 acts of Parliament were passed in 2010: 41 public general acts and 5 local acts.

indicates that an act has been transcribed on Wikisource, indicates that an act is available to view at legislation.gov.uk, and indicates the location of the original act in the Parliamentary Archives.

== Public general acts ==
Short title	Citation	Royal assent
Long title
Video Recordings Act 2010	2010 c. 1	21 January 2010
An Act to repeal and revive provisions of the Video Recordings Act 1984. (Note: Video Recordings Act 1984 (c. 39))
Terrorist Asset-Freezing (Temporary Provisions) Act 2010 (repealed)	2010 c. 2	10 February 2010
An Act to make provision for the temporary validity of certain Orders in Council imposing financial restrictions on, and in relation to, persons suspected of involvement in terrorist activity; and for connected purposes. (Repealed by Terrorist Asset-Freezing etc. Act 2010 (c. 38))
Fiscal Responsibility Act 2010 (repealed)	2010 c. 3	10 February 2010
An Act to make provision for and in connection with the imposition of duties for securing sound public finances. (Repealed by Budget Responsibility and National Audit Act 2011 (c. 4))
Corporation Tax Act 2010	2010 c. 4	3 March 2010
An Act to restate, with minor changes, certain enactments relating to corporation tax and certain enactments relating to company distributions; and for connected purposes.
Appropriation Act 2010	2010 c. 5	18 March 2010
An Act to authorise the use of resources for the service of the years ending with 31 March 2009 and 31 March 2010 and to apply certain sums out of the Consolidated Fund to the service of the year ending with 31 March 2010; and to appropriate the supply authorised in this Session of Parliament for the service of the years ending with 31 March 2009 and 31 March 2010.
Marriage (Wales) Act 2010	2010 c. 6	18 March 2010
An Act to enable persons to be married in a place of worship in a parish in the Church in Wales with which they have a qualifying connection; and for connected purposes.
Co-operative and Community Benefit Societies and Credit Unions Act 2010	2010 c. 7	18 March 2010
An Act to make provision for societies to be registered as co-operative or community benefit societies and to re-name the Industrial and Provident Societies Acts; (Note: Industrial and Provident Societies Act 1965 (c. 12), Industrial and Provident Societies Act 1967 (c. 48), Friendly and Industrial and Provident Societies Act 1968 (c. 55), Industrial and Provident Societies Act 1975 (c. 41), Industrial and Provident Societies Act 1978 (c. 34), and Industrial and Provident Societies Act 2002 (c. 20).) to apply to registered societies the provisions relating to directors disqualification and to make provision for the application of certain other enactments relating to companies; to confer power to make provision for credit unions corresponding to any provision applying to building societies; and for connected purposes.
Taxation (International and Other Provisions) Act 2010	2010 c. 8	18 March 2010
An Act to restate, with minor changes, certain enactments relating to tax; to make provision for purposes connected with the restatement of enactments by other tax law rewrite Acts; and for connected purposes.
Child Poverty Act 2010	2010 c. 9	25 March 2010
An Act to set targets relating to the eradication of child poverty, and to make other provision about child poverty.
Third Parties (Rights against Insurers) Act 2010	2010 c. 10	25 March 2010
An Act to make provision about the rights of third parties against insurers of liabilities to third parties in the case where the insured is insolvent, and in certain other cases.
Cluster Munitions (Prohibitions) Act 2010	2010 c. 11	25 March 2010
An Act to make provision for giving effect to the Convention on Cluster Munitions.
Appropriation (No. 2) Act 2010	2010 c. 12	8 April 2010
An Act to Appropriate the supply authorised in this Session of Parliament for the service of the year ending with 31 March 2011.
Finance Act 2010	2010 c. 13	8 April 2010
An Act to grant certain duties, to alter other duties, and to amend the law relating to the National Debt and the Public Revenue, and to make further provision in connection with finance.
Anti-Slavery Day Act 2010	2010 c. 14	8 April 2010
An Act to introduce a national day to raise awareness of the need to eradicate all forms of slavery, human trafficking and exploitation; and for connected purposes.
Equality Act 2010 or the Equalities Act 2010	2010 c. 15	8 April 2010
An Act to make provision to require Ministers of the Crown and others when making strategic decisions about the exercise of their functions to have regard to the desirability of reducing socio-economic inequalities; to reform and harmonise equality law and restate the greater part of the enactments relating to discrimination and harassment related to certain personal characteristics; to enable certain employers to be required to publish information about the differences in pay between male and female employees; to prohibit victimisation in certain circumstances; to require the exercise of certain functions to be with regard to the need to eliminate discrimination and other prohibited conduct; to enable duties to be imposed in relation to the exercise of public procurement functions; to increase equality of opportunity; to amend the law relating to rights and responsibilities in family relationships; and for connected purposes.
Northern Ireland Assembly Members Act 2010	2010 c. 16	8 April 2010
An Act to make provision relating to salaries, allowances and pensions for members of the Northern Ireland Assembly.
Crime and Security Act 2010	2010 c. 17	8 April 2010
An Act to make provision about police powers of stop and search; about the taking, retention, destruction and use of evidential material; for the protection of victims of domestic violence; about injunctions in respect of gang-related violence; about anti-social behaviour orders; about the private security industry; about possession and use of electronic communications devices in prison; about air weapons; for the compensation of victims of overseas terrorism; about licensing the sale and supply of alcohol; about searches in relation to persons subject to control orders; and for connected purposes.
Personal Care at Home Act 2010 (repealed)	2010 c. 18	8 April 2010
An Act to amend section 15 of the Community Care (Delayed Discharges etc.) Act 2003 (Note: Community Care (Delayed Discharges etc.) Act 2003 (c. 5)) so as to remove the restriction on the period for which personal care may be provided free of charge to persons living at home; and to make consequential provision. (Repealed by Social Services and Well-being (Wales) Act 2014 (Consequential Amendments) Regulations 2016 (SI 2016/413))
Mortgage Repossessions (Protection of Tenants etc) Act 2010	2010 c. 19	8 April 2010
An Act to protect persons whose tenancies are not binding on mortgagees and to require mortgagees to give notice of the proposed execution of possession orders.
Sunbeds (Regulation) Act 2010	2010 c. 20	8 April 2010
An Act to make provision about the use or supply of tanning devices that use artificial ultra-violet radiation; and for connected purposes.
Sustainable Communities Act 2007 (Amendment) Act 2010	2010 c. 21	8 April 2010
An Act to amend the Sustainable Communities Act 2007. (Note: Sustainable Communities Act 2007 (c. 23))
Debt Relief (Developing Countries) Act 2010	2010 c. 22	8 April 2010
An Act to make provision for or in connection with the relief of debts of certain developing countries.
Bribery Act 2010	2010 c. 23	8 April 2010
An Act to make provision about offences relating to bribery; and for connected purposes.
Digital Economy Act 2010	2010 c. 24	8 April 2010
An Act to make provision about the functions of the Office of Communications; to make provision about the online infringement of copyright and about penalties for infringement of copyright and performers' rights; to make provision about internet domain registries; to make provision about the functions of the Channel Four Television Corporation; to make provision about the regulation of television and radio services; to make provision about the regulation of the use of the electromagnetic spectrum; to amend the Video Recordings Act 1984; to make provision about public lending right in relation to electronic publications; and for connected purposes.
Constitutional Reform and Governance Act 2010	2010 c. 25	8 April 2010
An Act to make provision relating to the civil service of the State; to make provision in relation to section 3 of the Act of Settlement; (Note: Act of Settlement 1701 (12 & 13 Will. 3. c. 2)) to make provision relating to the ratification of treaties; to make provision relating to the counting of votes in parliamentary elections; to amend the Parliamentary Standards Act 2009 (Note: Parliamentary Standards Act 2009 (c. 13)) and the European Parliament (Pay and Pensions) Act 1979 (Note: European Parliament (Pay and Pensions) Act 1979 (c. 50)) and to make provision relating to pensions for members of the House of Commons, Ministers and other office holders; to make provision for treating members of the House of Commons and members of the House of Lords as resident, ordinarily resident and domiciled in the United Kingdom for taxation purposes; to amend the Government Resources and Accounts Act 2000 (Note: Government Resources and Accounts Act 2000 (c. 20)) and to make corresponding provision in relation to Wales; to amend the Public Records Act 1958 (Note: Public Records Act 1958 (6 & 7 Eliz. 2. c. 51)) and the Freedom of Information Act 2000. (Note: Freedom of Information Act 2000 (c. 36))
Children, Schools and Families Act 2010	2010 c. 26	8 April 2010
An Act to make provision about children with disabilities or special educational needs, school and other education, and governing bodies' powers; to make provision amending the Education Acts; to make provision about Local Safeguarding Children Boards; and to make provision about publication of information relating to family proceedings.
Energy Act 2010	2010 c. 27	8 April 2010
An Act to make provision relating to the demonstration, assessment and use of carbon capture and storage technology; to make provision about reports on decarbonisation of electricity generation and development and use of carbon capture and storage technology; to make provision for requiring benefits to be provided by holders of gas or electricity supply licences; to make provision about functions of the Gas and Electricity Markets Authority; to make provision about general duties of the Secretary of State in relation to gas and electricity markets; to make provision about electricity generation licences; to make provision about persons authorised to supply gas or electricity; and for connected purposes.
Financial Services Act 2010	2010 c. 28	8 April 2010
An Act to make provision amending the Financial Services and Markets Act 2000, (Note: Financial Services and Markets Act 2000 (c. 8)) including provision about financial education, and other provision about financial services and markets; and to make provision for the administration of court funds by the Director of Savings.
Flood and Water Management Act 2010	2010 c. 29	8 April 2010
An Act to make provision about water, including provision about the management of risks in connection with flooding and coastal erosion.
Appropriation (No. 3) Act 2010	2010 c. 30	27 July 2010
An Act to authorise the use of resources for the service of the year ending with 31 March 2011 and to apply certain sums out of the Consolidated Fund to the service of the year ending with 31 March 2011; to appropriate the supply authorised in this Session of Parliament for the service of the year ending with 31 March 2011; and to repeal certain Consolidated Fund and Appropriation Acts.
Finance (No. 2) Act 2010	2010 c. 31	27 July 2010
An Act to grant certain duties, to alter other duties, and to amend the law relating to the National Debt and the Public Revenue, and to make further provision in connection with finance.
Academies Act 2010	2010 c. 32	27 July 2010
An Act to make provision about Academies.
Finance (No. 3) Act 2010	2010 c. 33	16 December 2010
An Act to grant certain duties, to alter other duties, and to amend the law relating to the National Debt and the Public Revenue, and to make further provision in connection with finance.
Equitable Life (Payments) Act 2010	2010 c. 34	16 December 2010
An Act to provide finance for payments in cases where persons have been adversely affected by maladministration in the regulation before December 2001 of the Equitable Life Assurance Society; and for connected purposes.
Local Government Act 2010	2010 c. 35	16 December 2010
An Act to prevent the implementation of existing proposals made for the purposes of Part 1 of the Local Government and Public Involvement in Health Act 2007. (Note: Local Government and Public Involvement in Health Act 2007 (c. 28))
Savings Accounts and Health in Pregnancy Grant Act 2010	2010 c. 36	16 December 2010
An Act to make provision about eligibility for a child trust fund; to repeal the Saving Gateway Accounts Act 2009; (Note: Saving Gateway Accounts Act 2009 (c. 8)) to make provision about entitlement to health in pregnancy grant; and for connected purposes.
Superannuation Act 2010	2010 c. 37	16 December 2010
An Act to make provision for and in connection with limiting the value of the benefits which may be provided under so much of any scheme under section 1 of the Superannuation Act 1972 (Note: Superannuation Act 1972 (c. 11)) as provides by virtue of section 2(2) of that Act for benefits to be provided by way of compensation to or in respect of persons who suffer loss of office or employment; and to make provision about the procedure for modifying such a scheme.
Terrorist Asset-Freezing etc. Act 2010	2010 c. 38	16 December 2010
An Act to make provision for imposing financial restrictions on, and in relation to, certain persons believed or suspected to be, or to have been, involved in terrorist activities; to amend Schedule 7 to the Counter-Terrorism Act 2008; (Note: Counter-Terrorism Act 2008 (c. 28)) and for connected purposes.
Consolidated Fund Act 2010	2010 c. 39	21 December 2010
An Act to authorise the use of resources for the service of the year ending with 31 March 2011 and to apply certain sums out of the Consolidated Fund to the service of the year ending with 31 March 2011; and to authorise the use of resources for the year ending with 31 March 2012 and the issue of sums out of the Consolidated Fund for the year ending with 31 March 2012.
Identity Documents Act 2010	2010 c. 40	21 December 2010
An Act to make provision for and in connection with the repeal of the Identity Cards Act 2006. (Note: Identity Cards Act 2006 (c. 15))
Loans to Ireland Act 2010	2010 c. 41	21 December 2010
An Act to make provision in connection with the making of loans to Ireland by the United Kingdom.

== Local acts ==
Short title	Citation	Royal assent
Long title
Beverley Freemen Act 2010	2010 c. i	21 January 2010
An Act to re-state and extend the categories of person entitled by birthright to be enrolled as a Freeman of Beverley; to extend the area within which entitlement to be a Pasture Freeman may arise; to modify legislation relating to such entitlement; and for related purposes.
Bournemouth Borough Council Act 2010	2010 c. ii	8 April 2010
An Act to confer powers on Bournemouth Borough Council for the better control of street trading in the borough of Bournemouth.
Manchester City Council Act 2010	2010 c. iii	8 April 2010
An Act to confer powers on Manchester City Council for the better control of street trading in the city of Manchester.
Kent County Council (Filming on Highways) Act 2010	2010 c. iv	27 July 2010
An Act to confer powers on Kent County Council in relation to filming on highways; and for related purposes.
Allhallows Staining Church Act 2010	2010 c. v	27 July 2010
An Act to remove certain restrictions relating to the use of land comprising the former church of Allhallows Staining, its churchyard, and other adjoining land in the City of London; to make provision for the removal of any human remains from the land and to enable its use for other purposes; and for connected purposes.

== See also ==
- List of acts of the Parliament of the United Kingdom
