= List of acts of the Parliament of the United Kingdom from 2011 =

This is a list of acts of the Parliament of the United Kingdom passed in 2011.

Acts passed since 1963 are cited by calendar year, as opposed to the convention used for earlier acts of citing the regnal year(s) in which the relevant parliamentary session was held. Each act passed in a respective year is given a chapter number (abbreviated "c."), denoted by Arabic numerals in the case of public general acts, lowercase Roman numerals in the case of local acts, or italicised Arabic numerals in the case of personal acts. These run as separate series.

25 acts of Parliament were passed in 2011; all were public general acts.

indicates that an act has been transcribed on Wikisource, indicates that an act is available to view at legislation.gov.uk, and indicates the location of the original act in the Parliamentary Archives.

== Public general acts ==
Short title	Citation	Royal assent
Long title
Parliamentary Voting System and Constituencies Act 2011	2011 c. 1	16 February 2011
An Act to make provision for a referendum on the voting system for parliamentary elections and to provide for parliamentary elections to be held under the alternative vote system if a majority of those voting in the referendum are in favour of that; to make provision about the number and size of parliamentary constituencies; and for connected purposes.
Appropriation Act 2011	2011 c. 2	16 March 2011
An Act to authorise the use of resources for the service of the years ending with 31 March 2010 and 31 March 2011 and to apply certain sums out of the Consolidated Fund to the service of the years ending with 31 March 2010 and 31 March 2011; and to appropriate the supply authorised in this Session of Parliament for the service of the years ending with 31 March 2010 and 31 March 2011.
National Insurance Contributions Act 2011	2011 c. 3	22 March 2011
An Act to make provision for and in connection with increasing rates of national insurance contributions and a regional secondary Class 1 contributions holiday for new businesses.
Budget Responsibility and National Audit Act 2011	2011 c. 4	22 March 2011
An Act to make provision for a Charter for Budget Responsibility and for the publication of Financial Statements and Budget Reports; to establish the Office for Budget Responsibility; to make provision about the Comptroller and Auditor General and to establish a body corporate called the National Audit Office; to amend Schedules 5 and 7 to the Government of Wales Act 2006 (Note: Government of Wales Act 2006 (c. 32)) in relation to the Auditor General for Wales; and for connected purposes.
Postal Services Act 2011	2011 c. 5	13 June 2011
An Act to make provision for the restructuring of the Royal Mail group and about the Royal Mail Pension Plan; to make new provision about the regulation of postal services, including provision for a special administration regime; and for connected purposes.
Sports Grounds Safety Authority Act 2011	2011 c. 6	12 July 2011
An Act to confer further powers on the Football Licensing Authority and to amend its name; and for connected purposes.
Estates of Deceased Persons (Forfeiture Rule and Law of Succession) Act 2011	2011 c. 7	12 July 2011
An Act to amend the law relating to the distribution of the estates of deceased persons; and for connected purposes.
Wreck Removal Convention Act 2011	2011 c. 8	12 July 2011
An Act to implement the Nairobi International Convention on the Removal of Wrecks 2007.
Police (Detention and Bail) Act 2011	2011 c. 9	12 July 2011
An Act to make provision about the calculation of certain periods of time for the purposes of Part 4 of the Police and Criminal Evidence Act 1984. (Note: Police and Criminal Evidence Act 1984 (c. 60))
Supply and Appropriation (Main Estimates) Act 2011	2011 c. 10	19 July 2011
An Act to authorise the use of resources for the year ending with 31 March 2012; to authorise both the issue of sums out of the Consolidated Fund and the application of income for that year; and to appropriate the supply authorised for that year by this Act and by the Consolidated Fund Act 2010. (Note: Consolidated Fund Act 2010 (c. 39))
Finance Act 2011	2011 c. 11	19 July 2011
An Act to grant certain duties, to alter other duties, and to amend the law relating to the National Debt and the Public Revenue, and to make further provision in connection with finance.
European Union Act 2011	2011 c. 12	19 July 2011
An Act to make provision about treaties relating to the European Union and decisions made under them, including provision implementing the Protocol signed at Brussels on 23 June 2010 amending the Protocol (No. 36) on transitional provisions annexed to the Treaty on European Union, to the Treaty on the Functioning of the European Union and to the Treaty establishing the European Atomic Energy Community; and to make provision about the means by which directly applicable or directly effective European Union law has effect in the United Kingdom.
Police Reform and Social Responsibility Act 2011	2011 c. 13	15 September 2011
An Act to make provision about the administration and governance of police forces; about the licensing of, and for the imposition of a late night levy in relation to, the sale and supply of alcohol, and for the repeal of provisions about alcohol disorder zones; for the repeal of sections 132 to 138 of the Serious Organised Crime and Police Act 2005 (Note: Serious Organised Crime and Police Act 2005 (c. 15)) and for the prohibition of certain activities in Parliament Square; to enable provision in local authority byelaws to include powers of seizure and forfeiture; about the control of dangerous or otherwise harmful drugs; to restrict the issue of arrest warrants for certain extra-territorial offences; and for connected purposes.
Fixed-term Parliaments Act 2011 (repealed)	2011 c. 14	15 September 2011
An Act to make provision about the dissolution of Parliament and the determination of polling days for parliamentary general elections; and for connected purposes. (Repealed by Dissolution and Calling of Parliament Act 2022 (c. 11))
Sovereign Grant Act 2011	2011 c. 15	18 October 2011
An Act to make provision for the honour and dignity of the Crown and the Royal Family; make provision about allowances and pensions under the Civil List Acts of 1837 (Note: Civil List Act 1837 (1 & 2 Vict. c. 2)) and 1952; (Note: Civil List Act 1952 (15 & 16 Geo. 6 & 1 Eliz. 2. c. 37)) and for connected purposes.
Energy Act 2011	2011 c. 16	18 October 2011
An Act to make provision for the arrangement and financing of energy efficiency improvements to be made to properties by owners and occupiers; about the energy efficiency of properties in the private rented sector; about the promotion by energy companies of reductions in carbon emissions and home-heating costs; about information relating to energy consumption, efficiency and tariffs; for increasing the security of energy supplies; about access to upstream petroleum infrastructure and downstream gas processing facilities; about a special administration regime for energy supply companies; about designations under the Continental Shelf Act 1964; (Note: Continental Shelf Act 1964 (c. 29)) about licence modifications relating to offshore transmission and distribution of electricity; about the security of nuclear construction sites; about the decommissioning of nuclear sites and offshore infrastructure; for the use of pipelines for carbon capture and storage; for an annual report on contribution to carbon emissions reduction targets; for action relating to the energy efficiency of residential accommodation in England; for the generation of electricity from renewable sources; about renewable heat incentives in Northern Ireland; about the powers of the Coal Authority; for an amendment of section 137 of the Energy Act 2004; (Note: Energy Act 2004 (c. 20)) for the amendment and repeal of measures relating to home energy efficiency; and for connected purposes.
Coinage (Measurement) Act 2011	2011 c. 17	3 November 2011
An Act to make provision about the arrangements for measuring the standard weight of coins.
Armed Forces Act 2011	2011 c. 18	3 November 2011
An Act to continue the Armed Forces Act 2006; (Note: Armed Forces Act 2006 (c. 52)) to amend that Act and other enactments relating to the armed forces and the Ministry of Defence Police; to amend the Visiting Forces Act 1952; (Note: Visiting Forces Act 1952 (15 & 16 Geo. 6 & 1 Eliz. 2. c. 67)) to enable judge advocates to sit in civilian courts; to repeal the Naval Medical Compassionate Fund Act 1915; (Note: Naval Medical Compassionate Fund Act 1915 (5 & 6 Geo. 5. c. 28)) to make provision about the call out of reserve forces; and for connected purposes.
Pensions Act 2011	2011 c. 19	3 November 2011
An Act to make provision relating to pensions; and for connected purposes.
Localism Act 2011	2011 c. 20	15 November 2011
An Act to make provision about the functions and procedures of local and certain other authorities; to make provision about the functions of the Commission for Local Administration in England; to enable the recovery of financial sanctions imposed by the Court of Justice of the European Union on the United Kingdom from local and public authorities; to make provision about local government finance; to make provision about town and country planning, the Community Infrastructure Levy and the authorisation of nationally significant infrastructure projects; to make provision about social and other housing; to make provision about regeneration in London; and for connected purposes.
Education Act 2011	2011 c. 21	15 November 2011
An Act to make provision about education, childcare, apprenticeships and training; to make provision about schools and the school workforce, institutions within the further education sector and Academies; to abolish the General Teaching Council for England, the Training and Development Agency for Schools, the School Support Staff Negotiating Body, the Qualifications and Curriculum Development Agency and the Young People's Learning Agency for England; to make provision about the Office of Qualifications and Examinations Regulation and the Chief Executive of Skills Funding; to make provision about student loans and fees; and for connected purposes.
London Olympic Games and Paralympic Games (Amendment) Act 2011	2011 c. 22	14 December 2011
An Act to amend the London Olympic Games and Paralympic Games Act 2006. (Note: London Olympic Games and Paralympic Games Act 2006 (c. 12))
Terrorism Prevention and Investigation Measures Act 2011	2011 c. 23	14 December 2011
An Act to abolish control orders and make provision for the imposition of terrorism prevention and investigation measures.
Public Bodies Act 2011	2011 c. 24	14 December 2011
An Act to confer powers on Ministers of the Crown in relation to certain public bodies and offices; to confer powers on Welsh Ministers in relation to environmental and other public bodies; to make provision about delegation and shared services in relation to persons exercising environmental functions; to abolish regional development agencies; to make provision about the funding of Sianel Pedwar Cymru; to make provision about the powers of bodies established under the National Heritage Act 1983 (Note: National Heritage Act 1983 (c. 47)) to form companies; to repeal provisions of the Coroners and Justice Act 2009 (Note: Coroners and Justice Act 2009 (c. 25)) relating to appeals to the Chief Coroner; to make provision about amendment of Schedule 1 to the Superannuation Act 1972; (Note: Superannuation Act 1972 (c. 11)) and for connected purposes.
Charities Act 2011	2011 c. 25	14 December 2011
An Act to consolidate the Charities Act 1993 (Note: Charities Act 1993 (c. 10)) and other enactments which relate to charities.

== See also ==
- List of acts of the Parliament of the United Kingdom
