= 2010 United Kingdom budget =

2010 United Kingdom Budget may refer to:

- March 2010 United Kingdom budget
- June 2010 United Kingdom budget
