= Terrorist Asset-Freezing etc. Act 2010 =

Act of the Parliament of the United Kingdom

Terrorist Asset-Freezing etc. Act 2010 (Note: Section 56.)
- Act of Parliament
- Parliament of the United Kingdom
- Long title: An Act to make provision for imposing financial restrictions on, and in relation to, certain persons believed or suspected to be, or to have been, involved in terrorist activities; to amend Schedule 7 to the Counter-Terrorism Act 2008; and for connected purposes.
- Citation: 2010 c. 38
- Territorial extent: United Kingdom (Note: Section 53(1).)

Dates
- Royal assent: 16 December 2010
- Commencement: 16 December 2010 (Part 3) (Note: Section 55(4).); 17 December 2010 (Parts 1 and 2, and Schedules 1 and 2, subject to exceptions) (Note: Section 55(1).); 31 March 2012 (section 51, and connected provisions) (Note: Section 55(2). The Terrorist Asset-Freezing etc. Act 2010 (Commencement) Order 2011 (SI 2011/2835), article 2.)
Other legislation
Amends	Rules of the Court of Judicature (Northern Ireland) 1980; Senior Courts Act 1981; Civil Procedure Rules 1998; Regulation of Investigatory Powers Act 2000; Money Laundering Regulations 2007; Transfer of Funds (Information on the Payer) Regulations 2007; Counter-Terrorism Act 2008; Payment Services Regulations 2009; See § Repealed enactments
Repeals/revokes	See § Repealed enactments
Amended by	Legal Aid, Sentencing and Punishment of Offenders Act 2012; Financial Services Act 2012; Legal Aid and Coroners' Courts Act (Northern Ireland) 2014; Counter-Terrorism and Security Act 2015; Investigatory Powers Act 2016; Data Protection Act 2018; Sanctions and Anti-Money Laundering Act 2018; EEA Passport Rights (Amendment, etc., and Transitional Provisions) (EU Exit) Regulations 2018; Sentencing Act 2020
Relates to	Terrorist Asset-Freezing (Temporary Provisions) Act 2010

Status: Partially repealed

Text of statute as originally enacted

Revised text of statute as amended

The Terrorist Asset-Freezing etc. Act 2010 (c. 38) is an act of the Parliament of the United Kingdom that makes provision for the freezing of the funds and economic resources of persons believed or suspected to be, or to have been, involved in terrorist activities, replacing on a permanent statutory footing the temporary regime created by the Terrorist Asset-Freezing (Temporary Provisions) Act 2010.

== Background ==
The act was introduced following the decision of the Supreme Court of the United Kingdom in HM Treasury v Ahmed [2010] UKSC 2, given on 27 January 2010, which held that the asset-freezing orders made under the United Nations Act 1946—including the Terrorism (United Nations Measures) Order 2006—were unlawful because that act did not authorise coercive measures interfering with fundamental rights without parliamentary scrutiny. The Terrorist Asset-Freezing (Temporary Provisions) Act 2010 was passed to give temporary retrospective validity to existing designations while Parliament considered permanent legislation, which took the form of this act.

== Provisions ==
=== Repealed enactments ===
Sections 45(2) and 52(2) of the act repealed 3 enactments and revoked 13 instruments, listed in parts 1 and 2 of schedule 2 to the act, respectively.

Part 1 – Terrorist asset-freezing
Citation	Short title	Extent of repeal or revocation
SI 2001/3365	Terrorism (United Nations Measures) Order 2001	The whole instrument.
SI 2001/3801	Financial Services and Markets Act 2000 (Consequential Amendments) (No. 2) Order 2001	Article 2.
SI 2002/111	Al-Qa’ida and Taliban (United Nations Measures) Order 2002	Article 1(6).
SI 2003/1297	Terrorism (United Nations Measures) Order 2001 (Amendment) Regulations 2003	The whole instrument.
SI 2005/1525	Terrorism (United Nations Measures) Order 2001 (Amendment) Regulations 2005	The whole instrument.
SI 2005/3389	Serious Organised Crime and Police Act 2005 (Powers of Arrest) (Consequential Amendments) Order 2005	Article 15.
SI 2006/2657	Terrorism (United Nations Measures) Order 2006	The whole instrument.
SI 2007/2157	Money Laundering Regulations 2007	In regulation 2(1), in the definition of "terrorist financing", sub-paragraph (c).
SI 2007/3298	Transfer of Funds (Information on the Payer) Regulations 2007	In regulation 2(1), in the definition of "terrorist financing", sub-paragraph (c).
2008 c. 28	Counter-Terrorism Act 2008	Section 64(1)(e).
2008 c. 28	Counter-Terrorism Act 2008	Section 75(2)(d).
2008 c. 28	Counter-Terrorism Act 2008	In Part 4 of Schedule 9, the entries relating to—(a) the Terrorism (United Nations Measures) Order 2001, and (b) the Terrorism (United Nations Measures) Order 2006.
SI 2009/209	Payment Services Regulations 2009	In regulation 13(4)(d), the words from "article 7" (where it first occurs) to "2006 or".
SI 2009/1747	Terrorism (United Nations Measures) Order 2009	The whole instrument.
SI 2009/1911	Financial Restrictions Proceedings (UN Terrorism Orders) Order 2009	The whole instrument.
SI 2009/1912	Terrorism (United Nations Measures) Order (Consequential Amendments) Regulations 2009	Regulation 4.
2010 c. 2	Terrorist Asset-Freezing (Temporary Provisions) Act 2010	The whole act.

Part 2 – Terrorist financing, money laundering etc.
Citation	Short title	Extent of repeal
2008 c. 28	Counter-Terrorism Act 2008	In Schedule 7—(a) paragraph 5(2)(f), (b) in paragraph 18(1), paragraph (d) and the word "or" before the paragraph, (c) in paragraph 18(2), paragraph (d) (but not the word "or" at the end of the paragraph), (d) in paragraph 28, sub-paragraph (2) and, in sub-paragraph (3), the words "or court", and (e) in paragraph 39(2), paragraph (d).

== Subsequent developments ==
Part 1 of the act (sections 1 to 47), together with paragraphs 6 to 8 of Part 1 of Schedule 1 and the whole of Part 1 of Schedule 2, was repealed, with the exception of section 45(1) so far as it relates to paragraphs 1 to 5 of Schedule 1, by section 59(1) of the Sanctions and Anti-Money Laundering Act 2018 (2018 c. 13), which came into force on 31 December 2020. (Note: The Sanctions and Anti-Money Laundering Act 2018 (Commencement No. 2) Regulations 2020 (SI 2020/1535), regulation 3(b).) The repeal reflected the introduction of a new UK sanctions regime following the United Kingdom's withdrawal from the European Union, superseding the asset-freezing powers created by Part 1 of the 2010 act. Parts 2 and 3 of the act remain in force.
