= Names of the Irish state =

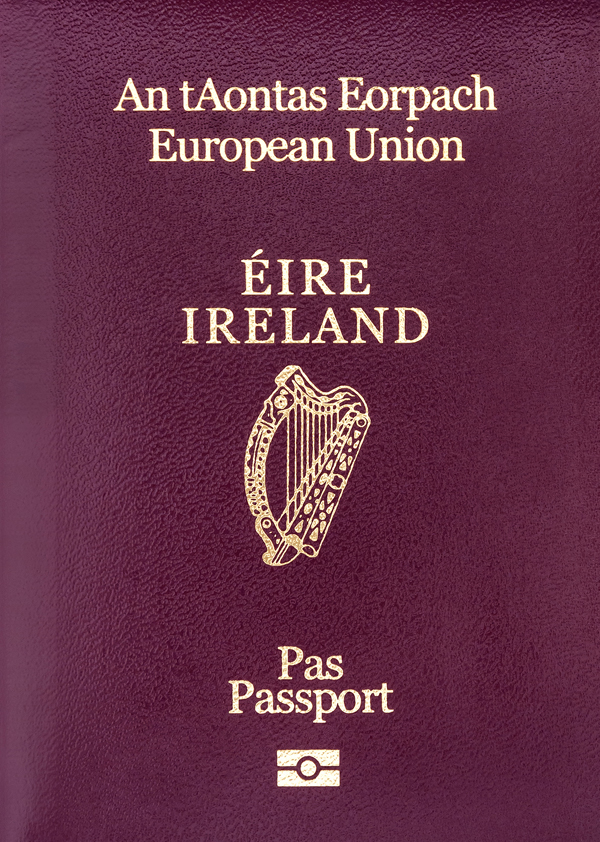
The front cover of an Irish passport showing the name of the state in its two official languages

According to the Constitution of Ireland, the names of the Irish state are Ireland (English) and Éire (Irish). From 1922 to 1937, its legal names were the Irish Free State (English) and Saorstát Éireann (Irish). The state has jurisdiction over almost five-sixths of the island of Ireland. The rest of the island is Northern Ireland, a part of the United Kingdom. In 1948 Ireland adopted the terms Republic of Ireland (English) and Poblacht na hÉireann (Irish) as the official descriptions of the state, without changing the constitutional names.

The terms Republic of Ireland (ROI), the Republic, the 26 counties or the South are the alternative names most often encountered. The term "Southern Ireland", although only having legal basis from 1921 to 1922, is still seen occasionally, particularly in Britain.

Until the 1998 Good Friday Agreement, British government and media declined to use the name Ireland, preferring Eire (without síneadh fada accent) until 1949 and Republic of Ireland thereafter.

== Constitutional name ==
Article 4 of the Constitution of Ireland, adopted in 1937, provides that "[t]he name of the State is Éire, or, in the English language, Ireland". Hence, the Irish state has two official names, Éire (in Irish) and Ireland (in English). For official purposes, the Irish government uses the name Éire in documents written in Irish, while using Ireland where the language of the documents is English, including in international treaties and other legal documents. The name of the state is reflected in its institutions and public offices. For example, there is a President of Ireland and a Constitution of Ireland. The name Ireland is also used in the state's diplomatic relations with foreign nations and at meetings of the United Nations, European Union, Council of Europe, International Monetary Fund, and Organisation for Economic Co-operation and Development.

The Constitution gives the Irish language formal precedence over English, and a reflection of this is that Éire is the only name of the Irish state to feature on a range of national symbols including the seal of the president, postage stamps and Irish euro coins. In 1981 the Department of Posts and Telegraphs recommended the inclusion of the word "Ireland" along with "Éire" on stamps but the Department of the Taoiseach vetoed the idea on the basis it could cause "constitutional and political repercussions" and that "the change could be unwelcome", as the name "Ireland" was considered by Unionists in Northern Ireland to refer to all 32 counties of Ireland. The spelling "Eire", with an E rather than an É, is not correct Irish orthography despite being preferred for many years by British government and media and others.

== Official description ==
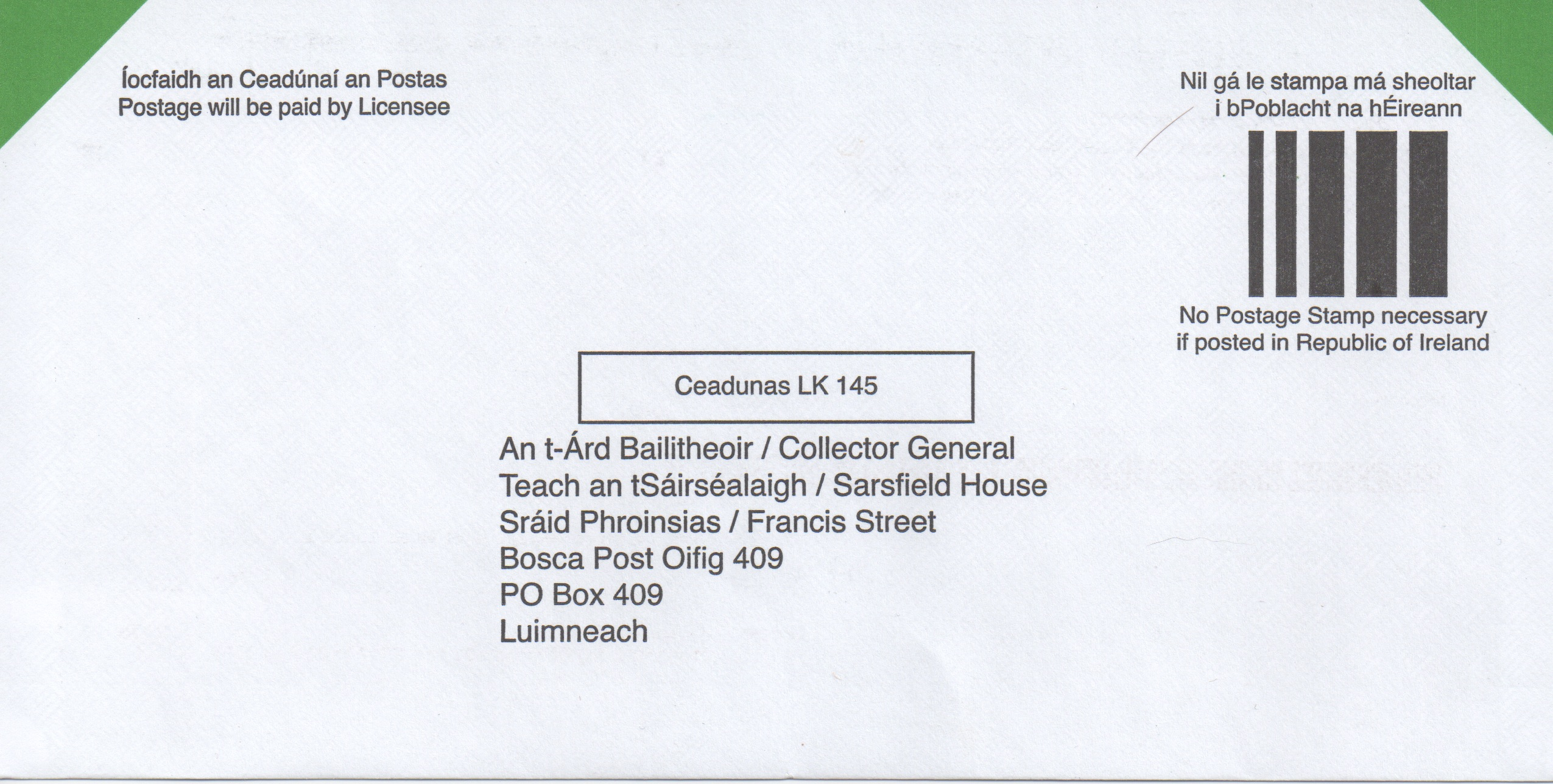
An envelope from the Office of the Revenue Commissioners, stating "No Postage Stamp necessary if posted in Republic of Ireland"

Since 1949, the Republic of Ireland Act 1948 has provided that the Republic of Ireland (or Poblacht na hÉireann in Irish) is the official description for the state. However, Ireland remains the constitutional name of the state.

The constitutional name Ireland is normally used. However, the official description Republic of Ireland is sometimes used when disambiguation is desired between the state and the island of Ireland. In colloquial use this is often shortened to 'the Republic'.

This distinction between description and name was and remains important because the Act was not a constitutional amendment and did not change the name of the state. If it had purported to do so, it would have been unconstitutional. The distinction between a description and a name has sometimes caused confusion. The Taoiseach, John A. Costello introduced the legislation with an explanation of the difference in the following way:

If I say that my name is Costello and that my description is that of senior counsel, I think that will be clear to anybody who wants to know...[Similarly, the state's] name in Irish is Éire and in the English language, Ireland. Its description in the English language is "the Republic of Ireland."

Many republics, including the French Republic and the Italian Republic reference the institutional form of the state in their long form names, but others, such as Hungary (since 2012) and Ukraine (since 1991) do not.

== European Union ==
The state joined the European Economic Community (now the European Union) in 1973. Its accession treaty was drawn up in all of the EU's then-official treaty languages (including English and Irish) and, as such, the Irish state joined under both of its names, Éire and Ireland. On 1 January 2007, Irish became an official working language of the EU. This did not change the name of the Irish state in EU law. However, it has meant for example that at official meetings of the EU Council of Ministers, nameplates for the Irish state now read as Éire – Ireland, whereas previously they would simply have read as Ireland.

The Inter Institutional Style Guide of The Office for Official Publications of the European Communities sets out how the names of the member states of the European Union must always be written and abbreviated in EU publications. Concerning Ireland, it states that its official names are Éire and Ireland; its official name in English is Ireland; its country code is IE; and its former abbreviation was IRL. It also adds the following guidance: "NB: Do not use 'Republic of Ireland' nor 'Irish Republic'."

== Historical names ==
=== Ancient ===
The Annals of the Four Masters describe how Ireland was referred to in ancient times:

- During the time of the Partholonians, Nemedians, Fomorians, and Firbolg, the island was given a number of names:
  - Inis Ealga signifying the noble or excellent island. The Latin translation was Insula Nobilis
  - Fiodh-Inis signifying the Woody island. In Latin this was Insula nemorosa
  - Crioch Fuinidh signifying the Final or remote country. In Latin as Terra finalia.
- Inisfáil meaning the Island of Destiny, and Inisfalia or Insula Fatalis in Latin. This was the name used by the Tuatha Dé Danann and from this 'Fál' became an ancient name for Ireland. In this respect, therefore, Lia Fáil, the Stone of Destiny, came to mean 'Stone of Ireland'. Inisfail appears as a synonym for Erin in some Irish romantic and nationalist poetry in English in the nineteenth and early twentieth centuries; Aubrey Thomas de Vere's 1863 poem Inisfail is an example.
- Ériu (from which derived Éire), Banba and Fódla were names given by the Dananns from three of their queens.
- Ierne refers to Ireland by various ancient Greek writers and many scholars have the opinion that in the poem when the Argonauts pass Neson Iernida, that is, the Island Iernis, they are referring to the island of Ireland, thus referring to Ireland longer ago than 1000 BC.
- Ogygia meaning the most ancient land is a name used by Plutarch in the first century which may refer to Ireland.
- Hibernia is first used to refer to Ireland by Julius Caesar in his account of Britain, and became a common term used by the Romans. They also used a number of other terms, namely Juverna, Juvernia, Ouvernia, Ibernia, Ierna, Vernia. Ptolemy also refers to it as Iouernia or Ivernia.
- Scotia or the land of the Scots is a term used by various Roman and other Latin writers, who referred to Irish raiders as Scoti. Some of the earliest mentions are in the 5th century, St. Patrick calls the Irish "Scoti", and in the 6th century, St. Isidore bishop of Seville and Gildas the British historian both refer to Ireland as Scotia. It was a term that exclusively referred to Ireland up until the eleventh century when modern Scotland was first referred to as Scotia. But even up until the sixteenth century, many Latin writers continued to refer to Ireland as Scotia. From the twelfth to the sixteenth century, various scholars used to distinguish between Ireland and Scotland by using Scotia Vetus or Scotia Major meaning Old Scotia or the Greater Scotia for Ireland, and Scotia Minor or Lesser Scotia for Scotland.. The name Scoti is used to describe the High King of Ireland in the 9th Century Book of Armagh, where Brian Boru is declared Imperator Scottorum, or Emperor of the Irish (Gaels) which later he took over the Uí Néill in the north of Ireland.
- Insula Sanctorum or the Island of the Saints and Insula Doctorum or the Island of the Learned are names used by various Latin writers; hence the modern-day quasi-poetic description of the island as the "Island of Saints and Scholars".

=== Pre-1919 ===
Following the Norman invasion, actual Ireland was known as Dominium Hiberniae, the Lordship of Ireland from 1171 to 1541, and the Kingdom of Ireland from 1541 to 1800. From 1801 to 1922 it was part of the United Kingdom of Great Britain and Ireland as a constituent country.

According to Roderick O'Flaherty, Joseph Justus Scaliger "reckons up eleven of twelve matricular languages yet remaining in Europe; viz. Latin, Greek, Teutonic, Sclavonian, Epirotic, Tartarian, Hungarian, Finnonian, Hibernian (which he by a barbarism calls Hirlandian), the Cantabrian, and the British". This could be the first mention of the name of Ireland.

=== Irish Republic (1919–1922) ===
The Easter Proclamation of 1916 declared the establishment of the Irish Republic. The rebel 32 county state retained this name until 1922.

In English, the revolutionary 32 county state proclaimed in 1916 and ratified in 1919 was known as the Irish Republic or, occasionally, the Republic of Ireland. Two different Irish language names were used: Poblacht na hÉireann and Saorstát Éireann, based on two competing Irish translations of the word republic: Poblacht and Saorstát. Poblacht was a direct translation coming from the Irish pobal, cognate with the Latin populus. Saorstát, on the other hand, was a compound of the words: saor (meaning "free") and stát ("state").

The term Poblacht na hÉireann is the one used in the Easter Proclamation of 1916. However the Declaration of Independence and other documents adopted in 1919 eschew this title in favour of Saorstát Éireann. A slight variant of this title, Saorstát na hÉireann, was also sometimes used in later days as was the Latin Respublica Hibernica.

(For an explanation continuing usage of the term Irish Republic in the United Kingdom, see Name dispute with the UK (below). Some republicans also continue to use the term because they refuse to recognise the Anglo-Irish Treaty – see below).

=== Southern Ireland (1921–1922) ===
Southern Ireland (Irish: Deisceart Éireann) was the official name given to an autonomous Home Rule region (or constituent country) of the United Kingdom. It was established under the Government of Ireland Act 1920 on 3 May 1921. It covered the same territory as the present day Irish state.

However, political turmoil and the ongoing War of Independence meant that it never fully functioned as envisaged. Southern Ireland was superseded in law on 6 December 1922 by the establishment of the Irish Free State. The term Southern Ireland does not have any official status today. However, it is sometimes still used colloquially, particularly by older people, in the United Kingdom.

=== Irish Free State (1922–1937) ===
During the negotiations on secession leading to the Anglo-Irish Treaty, Irish politicians wanted the state to be a republic, and its name to be the Republic of Ireland or the Irish Republic. However the British government refused to contemplate a republic because this would have entailed the Irish state severing the link with the British crown and ceasing to be a part of the British Empire. Instead, the parties agreed the state would be a self-governing Dominion within the British Commonwealth of Nations. The self-proclaimed Irish Republic had used Saorstát Éireann as its Irish name, and "Irish Free State" was derived by literal translation of Saorstát Éireann back into English; a South African province had a similar name. Article One of the treaty stated:

Ireland shall have the same constitutional status ... as the Dominion of Canada ... and shall be styled and known as the Irish Free State.

The May 1922 draft of the Constitution of the Irish Free State used only Irish forms of many names and titles, but on British insistence these were replaced with English equivalents; one exception was that references to "Saorstát Éireann" were amended to "the Irish Free State (Saorstát Éireann)". After the establishment of the Free State the Irish government often used the name Saorstát Éireann in documents in English as well as Irish; an exception was that postage stamps of the period used Éire. Because the Irish Free State was not a republic, since 1922 the word saorstát has fallen out of use in Irish as a translation of republic. When the official description of the state was declared to be the Republic of Ireland in 1949, its official Irish description became not Saorstát Éireann but Poblacht na hÉireann. It appears that the "Irish Free State" name was not generally popular, The Times reporting on the Irish general election in 1932:

The official parties in Ireland – the Free State is not a popular designation over there, for the other is, after all, the older name...

=== Éire (Irish language name since 1937) ===
As mentioned above, Article 4 of the Constitution of Ireland, gives the state its two official names, Éire in Irish and Ireland in English. Each name is a direct translation of the other. From 1937, the name Éire was often used even in the English language.

In May 1937, when the President of the Executive Council, Éamon de Valera presented the first draft of the Constitution to the parliamentary committee on the Constitution, Article 4 simply provided: "The name of the State is Éire". There was no reference to Ireland at all. Opposition politicians immediately proposed that the word Ireland be substituted for the word Éire throughout the English text. They argued that Ireland was the name known by every European country; that the name should not be surrendered; that the name Ireland might instead be adopted by Northern Ireland; and that the choice of Éire might damage the status of the state internationally by drawing a "distinction between the state...and what has been known for centuries as Ireland". Responding, de Valera stressed that the Irish text of the constitution was to be the foundation text. In light of this, he said the name Éire was more logical and that it would mean an Irish name would become accepted even in the English language. However, he said he had "no strong views" and he agreed "that in the English translation the name of the state [would be] Ireland".

When de Valera subsequently tabled an amendment to give effect to this concession, he proposed Article 4's current wording: "The name of the State is Éire, or, in the English language, Ireland." In doing so, he remarked that as "the Irish text is the fundamental text [it is as well] that Éire is used here and there." With almost no debate, the wording was agreed to and subsequently became the law of the land.

It is sometimes said that de Valera wished to reserve the names Republic of Ireland or Irish Republic for the day when a united Ireland might be achieved. These names were not discussed in the parliamentary debates on the Constitution. However, the reason which de Valera gave in the debates for omitting any reference to the word republic throughout the constitution was that he thought the constitution would gain broader support if it did not refer to a republic.

After the adoption of the Constitution, de Valera's government generally encouraged use of the name Éire (rather than Ireland) but not always. His government also appreciated the significance of the name Ireland. So for example, when the Irish ambassador in Berlin, Charles Bewley sought instructions concerning the new name of the State, he was advised by Joseph P. Walshe, for decades the top civil servant in the Irish Department of External Affairs that:

When informing the German Government of the change of the name of the State, you should not emphasise the Irish form. The change of name would not, of course, have the same political or national significance if "Éire" were to be used by foreigners. As you are aware, it is the hope of everybody in this country that the use of "Ireland" to describe the Twenty-Six Counties will have a definite psychological effect in favour of the unity of this country on both Irish and foreign minds.

Thus, while sometimes encouraging the use of the name Éire even in English, de Valera's government insisted at other times on the use of the name Ireland. The United Kingdom disputed Irish adoption of the name "Ireland" (below). De Valera's decision to generally use the name Éire was sometimes severely criticised as a poor choice of name. Some argued that it was confusing. Others said the name Éire might strengthen the claim of the government of Northern Ireland to the ancient name of Ulster for their state. However, the name Éire (generally appearing as Eire in English) quickly became widely accepted in English. Nevertheless, this only fuelled more criticism of the name, as once free in the English language, it evolved – leading to what opposition politicians stated were "sneering titles such as Eirish". These criticisms were aired at length in the Oireachtas when the Republic of Ireland Act was being debated. De Valera's use of the name Éire as well as the wording of Article 4 were sharply criticised. The Taoiseach of the day, John A. Costello said "that tremendous confusion ha[d] been caused by the use of that word Éire in Article 4. By a misuse by malicious people of that word, Éire, they have identified it with the Twenty-Six Counties and not with the State that was set up under this Constitution of 1937."

Despite these criticisms, de Valera initially called for the proposed Irish description of the state, Poblacht na h-Éireann to also be inserted into the English text of the Act in the same way both the Irish and English names of the state are used in Article 4. However, de Valera subsequently retreated from this position and in what may be seen as an implicit acceptance of the criticisms made of the wording of Article 4 itself, de Valera accepted that it was better not to also use the Irish description in the English text. Despite not changing the name, when the Republic of Ireland Act was passed, the name Éire quickly fell into disuse (except in the Irish language). However the name continues to linger on, particularly in the United Kingdom. The Constitution review group's 1967 report discusses Article 4:

Throughout the years since 1937 the term "Éire" has been widely misused in English as the name of the State. Those who so use it can point to the Article itself as their justification, arguing that the word "or" in the English text of the Article indicates that "Ireland" is merely an alternative English form of the name. There is, perhaps, at least an ambiguity in the Article that provides a colourable pretext for this misuse. In the light of past experience we feel that the opportunity might now be taken to remove this difficulty by declaring in the Irish text "Éire is ainm don Stát" and in the English text "The name of the State is Ireland". There would seem to be no objection to this simplification since both texts are of equal validity (except in a case of conflict), and the word "Ireland" is the English equivalent of the Irish word "Éire".

Historically, "Eire" was commonly used as a state-name by a variety of organisations. For example, in 1938, the "Irish Amateur Athletic Union" (IAAU) changed its name to "Amateur Athletic Union of Eire" (AAUE) and affiliated to the International Amateur Athletic Federation (IAAF) under the country name "Eire". In 1967, the AAUE merged with most of the rival NACA to form Bord Lúthchleas na hÉireann (BLÉ). BLÉ requested the IAAF to change the country's name to "Ireland". This finally happened in 1981.

== Abbreviations ==
Under the International Organization for Standardization's ISO 3166 standard, the two-letter code for Ireland is "IE" while the three-letter code is "IRL". The "IE" code is the basis for the choice of ".ie" for Irish internet addresses. The IRL code features on Irish driving licences, passports and is most visible on contemporary Irish EU style vehicle registration plates. Under the Convention on International Civil Aviation Irish registered aircraft carry the nationality mark "EI", although this abbreviation has nothing to do with the state's name. For example, the ICAO gives "EG" and "EH" as the abbreviations for Belgium and the Netherlands.

== Alternative names ==
A variety of alternative names are also used for the Irish state. Sometimes alternative names are chosen because the name "Ireland" could be confused with the name of the island the state shares with Northern Ireland. Other times alternative names are chosen for political reasons.

"Republic of Ireland", the "description" of the state according to the Republic of Ireland Act 1948, is often used. In sport, the national football team plays as the "Republic of Ireland". This is because the Ireland national team was organised by the Irish Football Association, from 1882 to 1950. A new organisation, the Football Association of the Irish Free State was formed after partition to organize a new team to represent the newly formed Irish Free State. Over time the Irish Football Association came to be the body for organising association football in Northern Ireland only. However, both association football federations continued to field a team called "Ireland". Despite protests from both organisations, in 1953 FIFA decreed that neither team could be referred to as Ireland in competitions which both teams were eligible to enter. The two teams now play under the names "Republic of Ireland" and "Northern Ireland".

"Irish Republic" is commonly used as a name for the state in Britain but disliked in the Republic, where "Irish Republic" refers to the revolutionary state of the First Dáil in 1919. The initialism "ROI", for "Republic of Ireland", is also often used outside official circles. Shorter colloquial names include "the Republic" or "the South".

Irish republicans, and other opponents of Partition, often refer to the state as the "Twenty-Six Counties" or "26 Counties" (with Northern Ireland as the "Six Counties" or "6 Counties") and sometimes as the "Free State" (a reference to the pre-1937 state). Speaking in the Dáil on 13 April 2000, Sinn Féin's Caoimhghín Ó Caoláin explained it as follows:

"In the republican political tradition, to which I belong, the State is often referred to as the 26-County State. This is a conscious response to the partitionist view, prevalent for so long and still sadly widespread, that Ireland stops at the Border. The Constitution says that the name of the State is Ireland, and Éire in the Irish language. Quite against the intentions of the framers of the Constitution, this has led to an identification of Ireland with only 26 of our 32 counties in the minds of many people".

"Southern Irish Commonwealth" and "Southern Irish Republic" were names suggested by the British publication, The Spectator, in 1921. These suggestions never became widely used but are noteworthy for showing how fluid names for the territory were at the time.

== Distinguishing the state from the island ==
Goods originating in Northern Ireland can be sold in the Republic as "Irish" or "made in Ireland", which some consumers find confusing or misleading. The private National Dairy Council introduced a "Farmed in the Republic of Ireland" logo in 2009, whereas Bord Bia, the statutory food labelling authority, has distinct "Ireland", "Northern Ireland", and "Ireland & Northern Ireland" logos; the "Ireland" logos incorporate an Irish tricolour as well as text. (Note: There is a separate debate about whether the flag relates only to the 26-county state or also to the entire island.) The private Guaranteed Irish logo is mostly used by firms in the Republic, but there is one in Northern Ireland.

== Name dispute with the UK ==
This section concerns a protracted dispute which existed between the Irish and British governments over the official names of their respective states: Ireland and the United Kingdom of Great Britain and Northern Ireland. Although following the Good Friday Agreement in 1998 the dispute was supposed to end as each government now accepts the official name of the other state, the Irish Ministry of Foreign Affairs still refers to the UK as "Great Britain".

=== "Eire" and "Éire" versus Ireland ===
In 1937, the Irish Free State Government arranged for a plebiscite to approve a new Irish Constitution. Articles 2 and 3 of the new Constitution expressed a territorial claim to the "whole island of Ireland" and thus an irredentist claim to the territory of Northern Ireland. In addition, Article 4 provided that "the name of the state is Éire, or, in the English language, Ireland". This too was seen by the British Government as another anti-partitionist attempt to lay claim to the whole of the island.

In the run up to the adoption of the new Irish Constitution which took effect on 29 December 1937, the British Cabinet considered how to respond as regards the new name. A report to Cabinet by the Secretary of State for Dominion Affairs reported that "[De Valera] feels strongly that the title Irish Free State was one of the things imposed on the Irish by the British in 1921". The same report recommended that the UK Government use "always the Irish term 'Eire' when referring to the State, and ourselves avoiding the use of the term 'Ireland,' except to describe the whole island as a geographical entity". It so happened that the Constitution would come into force when the Westminster Parliament was adjourned over the Christmas. Accordingly, the preferred course of the Prime Minister making a statement on the matter in Parliament was ruled out.

Ultimately, in response to the new constitution and in consultation with all the governments of the British Commonwealth except the Irish Government, the British government published a communiqué on 30 December 1937, the day after the constitution took effect. In the communiqué, the British government recognised that the new constitution gave the Irish state two names Ireland or Éire. It also implicitly recognised that the two names had an identical meaning, by declaring:

His Majesty's Government in the United Kingdom has considered the position created by the new Constitution ... of the Irish Free State, in future to be described under the Constitution as 'Eire' or 'Ireland' ... [and] cannot recognise that the adoption of the name 'Eire' or 'Ireland', or any other provision of those articles [of the Irish constitution], involves any right to territory ... forming part of the United Kingdom of Great Britain and Northern Ireland ... They therefore regard the use of the name 'Eire' or 'Ireland' in this connection as relating only to that area which has hitherto been known as the Irish Free State.

The British government finessed article 4 and ignored articles 2 and 3: if the Irish constitution said the name of the state in the national language was Éire, then that (written as "Eire") was what the British government would call it. By doing so, it avoided any need to call the Irish state, in the English language, Ireland. The change of name effected by the 1937 constitution (but not the other constitutional changes), was given effect in United Kingdom law in the Eire (Confirmation of Agreements) Act 1938 which covered the Anglo-Irish Trade Agreement between "The Government of Éire and the Government of the United Kingdom". Under Section 1 of that Act, it was declared that (for the purposes of United Kingdom legislation) the territory "which was ... known as Irish Free State shall be styled as ... Eire".

The British approach of calling the state Eire was greatly assisted by the general preference of Éamon de Valera, the leader of the Irish government at the time, that the state be known as Éire, even in English. This is seen in the English-language preamble of the Constitution. However, the Irish government, even when led by de Valera, also appreciated the significance of the name Ireland and insisted on that name in some fora. For example, in 1938 Irish representatives in the Commonwealth countries gave their official titles as High Commissioner for Ireland and the League of Nations was informed that Ireland was the correct English name for the country. A unique modus vivendi was adopted by the two states when they concluded a bilateral agreement on air services in 1946. That agreement was styled as an "Agreement between the United Kingdom and Ireland (Eire)". A parliamentary question as to why the term "Ireland (Eire)" was used rather than simply "Eire" was put in the British House of Commons. A parliamentary secretary for the Government, Ivor Thomas, explained the position as follows:

The designation in the Air Services Agreement was used in order to comply with the provisions of the law of the United Kingdom and of Eire respectively. In the English language, the country in question is properly described by one of the signatories as Eire and by the other as Ireland, and the designation adopted recognises this position without creating misunderstanding about the territory concerned.

The practice in other Commonwealth countries varied: At the outset at least, it appears the Union of South Africa and Canada used the name Ireland while New Zealand favoured Eire. In 1947, the United Kingdom Home Office went further by issuing instructions to United Kingdom government departments to use Eire. Nevertheless, over time the name Éire fell increasingly out of use by both the Irish government (except in the Irish language) and internationally, in particular after the passing of the Republic of Ireland Act.

=== Republic of Ireland versus Ireland ===
On 18 April 1949, the Republic of Ireland Act, 1948 (No. 22 of 1948), came into operation, removing the last functions of the King (King George VI). Section two of the Act states, "It is hereby declared that the description of the State shall be the Republic of Ireland."

The following note of what Prime Minister Clement Attlee said at a British Cabinet meeting on 12 January 1949 illustrates some of the considerations the British government had to consider following this declaration:

N.I. [Northern Ireland] Ministers accepted the name "N.I." eventually (the Northern Ireland Government would have preferred the name Ulster). They wanted us, however, to go on using "Eire" (for the Irish state). But other countries won't do so. Suggested therefore we sh[oul]d use "Republic of Ireland". N.I. prefer "Irish Republic". But let us not speak of "Ireland". Can we put Republic of Ireland on Bill: but use in official pp. [papers] etc. (:) Irish Republic or Southern Ireland. Agreed.

Ultimately, the British responded by passing the Ireland Act 1949 which provided that:

The part of Ireland referred to in subsection (1) of this section is hereafter in this Act referred to, and may in any Act, enactment or instrument passed or made after the passing of this Act be referred to, by the name attributed thereto by the law thereof, that is to say, as the Republic of Ireland. (s 1.3)

It was the culmination of careful consideration by the Prime Minister Attlee. He put it that "a refusal to use the title 'Republic of Ireland' in any circumstances would involve [the UK] in continuing friction with the Eire Government: it would perpetuate the "inconveniences and indignities" which we now experience as a result of our present policy of insisting on the title 'Eire' as against Dublin's preference for 'Ireland.'"

Hence, the Ireland Act formally provided the name Republic of Ireland for use instead of the name Eire in British law. Later the name Eire was abolished entirely in British law under the Statute Law (Repeals) Act 1981. This has meant that the Republic of Ireland is the only name for the Irish state officially provided for in domestic UK law.

Notwithstanding the Ireland Act 1949, the British government would often continue to refer to the Irish state by other names such as the Irish Republic or Southern Ireland. A good example of this was in the Treaty of London, 1949. The UK government had been centrally involved in preparing the treaty which was signed in London and established the Council of Europe. The treaty consistently describes the Irish state as the Irish Republic. Opposition leader, Éamon de Valera, queried this. The Minister for External Affairs, Seán MacBride, responded that he agreed "that the description is not possibly as accurate as we would have liked it to be". Yet he also said that the term Irish Republic was used in the treaty "in a general sense in the way the country is described; French Republic, Irish Republic, Italian Republic, Kingdom of the Netherlands and so on." However, leading opposition politician, Frank Aiken, was not satisfied with this response. Speaking in the Dáil, Aiken cited article 26 of the treaty where "the names of the countries are given as "Belgium", "Denmark" and "France", not "Republic of France" or "French Republic"" noting that "one would expect that the next thing one would find would be "Ireland", but instead we have "Belgium, Denmark, France, Irish Republic, Italy, Luxembourg" and so on. Aiken remarked that some British MPs wanted "to popularise the name Irish Republic". He asked the Taoiseach, John Costello to clear up "what exactly is the name of this State going to be in international documents, international agreements and matters of that kind." Aiken expressed the view that "We want to keep up the name given in the Constitution, "Ireland", in order to show that our claim is to the whole island of Ireland and in international documents, in my opinion, the State should be alluded to as "Ireland" or the "Republic of Ireland"."

The following month the Minister for External Affairs clarified at the Council of Europe that Ireland was how the state should be described. This was reported on in The Times on 8 August 1949 in the following terms:

Mr. MacBride, the Irish Minister for External Affairs, to-night sent an official request to the secretariat of the Council of Europe to refer to his country simply as Ireland and not as Eire or as the Republic of Ireland. This request is seen by observers here as part of a systematic campaign by the Government in Dublin to link the question of the partition of Ireland with every organisation of which it is a member.

Therefore, even with the UK's Ireland Act and its provision of Republic of Ireland as a UK "name" for the Irish state, a dispute over the names of their respective states was to continue between the UK and Irish governments. For the Irish, Republic of Ireland was still not the name of the state, merely its description. For a brief period from the coming into effect of the Republic of Ireland Act until the second half of 1950 the Irish Government was inconsistent in the way it described itself and the state: At times it described itself internationally as the Government of the Republic of Ireland; At other times it continued to insist that the name of the Irish state was Ireland.

From the second half of 1950, the Irish government reverted to consistently styling itself the Government of Ireland. The Irish state joined the United Nations in 1955 as Ireland over protests concerning its name by the United Kingdom. Similarly, the United Kingdom protested when the Irish state was admitted to the European Economic Community in 1973 as Ireland. Australia also for several years following the declaration of a republic refused to exchange ambassadors with Dublin on the basis of the name "Ireland" rather than "Republic of Ireland", on the basis that this would have involved recognition of a territorial claim to part of His/Her Majesty's dominions. A legacy of this dispute was the designation of the Irish legation in London as the "Irish Embassy", rather than the title "Embassy of Ireland" preferred by Dublin. A further Commonwealth anomaly was the title of the monarch in Canada. In 1950, following the declaration of a republic the Irish and Canadian high commissioners were replaced by ambassadors / ministers plenipotentiary, accredited on the basis of the sovereign's title in Canada still encompassing the whole of Ireland. Even in 1952, following the accession of Queen Elizabeth II, and prior to the revised definition of the royal title in 1953, Canada's preferred format was: Elizabeth the Second, by the Grace of God, of Great Britain, Ireland and the British Dominions beyond the Seas.

For its part, the Irish government also disputed the right of the British state to call itself the United Kingdom of Great Britain and Northern Ireland. The Irish government objected to the words "and Northern Ireland" in the name of the British state. The name also ran against the Irish state's territorial claim to Northern Ireland. The dispute over the names of their respective states was most apparent when the two states concluded bilateral treaties. For example, when the Anglo-Irish Agreement was made in 1985 between the two states, the British text of the agreement gave it the formal title "Agreement between the Government of the United Kingdom of Great Britain and Northern Ireland and the Government of the Republic of Ireland" whereas the Irish government's text of the very same agreement gave it the formal title "Agreement between the Government of Ireland and the Government of the United Kingdom".

The Government Information Bureau in 1953 issued a directive, noting that Article 4 of the 1937 Constitution gave the name as "Éire" or, in the English language, "Ireland"; they noted that whenever the name of the state was mentioned in an English language document, Ireland should be used and that "Care should be taken", the directive stated, "to avoid the use of the expression Republic of Ireland or Irish Republic in such a context or in such a manner as might suggest that it is a geographical term applicable to the area of the Twenty‐Six counties." According to Mary Daly, this directive remained in use for a number of years. A copy was sent to Bord Fáilte (the Irish tourist board) in 1959, reminding them not to use the title "the Republic of Ireland" on their promotional literature.

In 1963, under the auspices of the Council of Europe, to revise geography textbooks, the Irish Department of Education issued guidelines to delegates on politically correct geographic terminology: "British Isles" and "United Kingdom" were deemed objectionable and that delegates insist on "Ireland" and "Great Britain." The term "Republic of Ireland" should be avoided but that delegates were no longer to insist on "the Six Counties" in place of "Northern Ireland" in an attempt to improve relations with Northern Ireland.

In February 1964, the Irish government indicated its wish to appoint an ambassador to Canberra. The one issue, however, that blocked the exchange of ambassadors had been the insistence of Australia that the letters carried by the Irish ambassador should have the royal title as "Elizabeth the Second, of the United Kingdom of Great Britain and Northern Ireland, Australia and Her Other Realms and Territories, Queen." This was, according to Daly, despite the fact that the Australian Royal Style and Titles Act 1953 did not mention Northern Ireland, referring only to "the United Kingdom, Australia" etc. However, that November when Eoin MacWhite presented his credentials as Irish Ambassador to Australia, a circular was issued to all Australian government departments indicating to them to use the word "Ireland" rather than "the Irish Republic". The UK was by the mid-1960s the only country not to refer to the state as Ireland.

In 1985 the British command papers described the Anglo-Irish Agreement as an "Agreement between the Government of the United Kingdom of Great Britain and Northern Ireland and the Government of the Republic of Ireland", with the Irish official papers described it as an "Agreement Between the Government of Ireland and the Government of the United Kingdom". The British Foreign and Commonwealth Office referred to Ireland as the "Republic of Ireland" – however since 2000 it has referred to the State as "Ireland." The credentials presented by the British ambassador, Stewart Eldon, in 2003, were addressed to the President of Ireland.

=== Republic of Ireland versus Irish Republic ===
When the Republic of Ireland Act was enacted, the United Kingdom cabinet debated whether it should use the new name in preference to "Eire". Having said that it was minded to do so and invited comment, the Prime Minister of Northern Ireland (Sir Basil Brooke, Ulster Unionist) objected in the strongest possible terms, saying that the new description "was intended to repeat Eire's claim to jurisdiction over the whole island." Attlee partly accepted this argument, saying that the [UK] bill should formally recognise the title 'Republic of Ireland' but that the description "The Irish Republic" would be employed in all official usage. Indeed, despite the Belfast Agreement, almost all British publications still follow this style (see below).

=== In the Irish courts ===
The name of the state — both in English and in Irish — was considered in one case in the Irish courts. In the 1989 Supreme Court case of Ellis v O'Dea, the court objected to the issuing of extradition warrants (in English) by the United Kingdom's courts naming the state as Éire and not Ireland. Judge Brian Walsh said that while the courts of other countries were at liberty to issue such warrants in the Irish language, if they used the English language they had to refer to the state as Ireland. Walsh and Judge Niall McCarthy expressed the view that where extradition warrants did not use the correct name of the state it was the duty of the courts and of the Gardaí to return such warrants for rectification. Both judges also noted that the Republic of Ireland Act 1948 did not change the name of the state as prescribed in the Constitution. The following is an extract from Walsh's judgement:

In the English language the name of this State is "Ireland" and is so prescribed by Article 4 of the Constitution. Of course if the courts of the United Kingdom or of other States choose to issue warrants in the Irish language then they are at liberty to use the Irish language name of the State ... However, they are not at liberty to attribute to this State a name which is not its correct name ... If there is any confusion in the United Kingdom courts possibly it is due to the terms of the United Kingdom statute named the Ireland Act, 1949 ... That enactment purported to provide that this State should be "referred to ... by the name attributed to it by the law thereof, that is to say, as the Republic of Ireland" (emphasis supplied). That of course is an erroneous statement of the law of Ireland. Historically it is even more difficult to explain. There is only one State in the world named Ireland since it was so provided by Article 4 of the Constitution in 1937 and that name was recognised by a communiqué from No. 10 Downing Street, London in 1937.

=== Good Friday Agreement ===
The dispute between the UK and Irish governments over the names of their respective states has not yet been finally resolved. The Ireland Act 1949 has not been formally repealed by the UK but has been in effect overridden. This resolution took place when the Good Friday Agreement (or Belfast Agreement) was concluded in 1998. That Agreement concerned a wide range of constitutional and other matters regarding Northern Ireland. Notably, as part of it, the Irish state dropped its legal claim to the territory of Northern Ireland. In the title of the Agreement, the two governments used their respective domestic law names, the Government of the United Kingdom of Great Britain and Northern Ireland and the Government of Ireland. However, the Irish Ministry of Foreign Affairs still refers to the UK as "Great Britain". Some Unionist members of the British parliament objected strenuously to the use of the term the Government of Ireland. They proposed that the practice of referring to the Irish government as the Government of the Republic of Ireland should be continued. Their objections were not accepted. Responding for the British government in the House of Lords, Lord Dubs explained that the new practice of referring to the Irish state by the name Ireland:

actually represents the welcome disappearance of one small but significant difference in practice between the British and Irish Governments that the [Belfast Agreement] has made possible. Hitherto, the Irish Government have referred to themselves, and generally been referred to in international circles, as the "Government of Ireland". We, however, have called them "Government of the Republic of Ireland". Similarly, while the proper name of this state is the "Government of the United Kingdom of Great Britain and Northern Ireland", the Irish have used solely the name "Government of the United Kingdom". With the agreement we have aligned our practice. We will call them by the name they favour, and they will use the name for us that we favour. Since the constitutional status of Northern Ireland is no longer a matter of disagreement between us, we can put an end to the argument about names.

This policy has been respected by both governments since the Belfast Agreement. A House of Lords debate, ten years later in May 2008, on Regulations governing political donations by Irish citizens and bodies to political parties in Northern Ireland, is a good example of this. During the debate Lord Rooker, a Government minister, said that the Regulations would: "acknowledge the special place that the island of Ireland and the Republic of Ireland occupy in the political life of Northern Ireland". Responding, Lord Glentoran suggested that Lord Rooker in fact "meant to say that [the draft Regulations recognise] the special place that Ireland occupies in the political life of Northern Ireland." Agreeing with Lord Glentoran's observation, Lord Rooker responded:

I still cannot get used to the fact that we do not refer to the Republic of Ireland. I stumbled over that part of my brief because I saw "Ireland". Yes, I did mean the special role that Ireland plays in the political life of Northern Ireland.

So far there has been no domestic British legislation explicitly providing that Ireland may be used as a name for the Irish state for the purposes of domestic British law. While the UK's Ireland Act 1949 provides for use of the name Republic of Ireland in domestic British law, that legislation is permissive rather than mandatory so it does not mean Ireland cannot be used instead.

There are now a growing number of UK statutes and regulations that refer to the Irish state as simply Ireland and make no reference to the Republic of Ireland. One example is the Disqualifications Act 2000 which refers, inter alia, to the "legislature of Ireland", the "House of Representatives of Ireland" and the "Senate of Ireland". The Loans to Ireland Act 2010 refers to the state as simply "Ireland", as does the British Nationality (Irish Citizens) Act 2024. The Permanent Committee on Geographical Names for British Official Use uses simply Ireland for the country name. Similarly, the British Foreign, Commonwealth and Development Office do not use the term Republic of Ireland but rather apply the term Ireland when advising potential British Nationals choosing to live in Ireland. In contrast, the Qualified Lawyers Transfer Regulations 1990 referred to barristers and solicitors qualified "in Ireland" and made no reference to the "Republic of Ireland" but when these regulations were replaced by the Qualified Lawyers Transfer Regulations 2009, the Regulations were amended to refer to the Republic of Ireland and not Ireland.

=== British media usage ===
The names attributed to the state by the British media are sometimes the subject of discussion in the state. The style guides of British news sources adopt differing policies for referring to the state (though notably all deprecate 'Eire' even though it was often used even in the late 20th century):

The Times
"Ireland: the two parts should be called the Republic of Ireland or the Irish Republic (avoid Eire except in direct quotes or historical context), and Northern Ireland."
The Guardian
"Ireland, Irish Republic, not Éire or "Southern Ireland""
The Daily Telegraph
"Ireland includes Northern Ireland and the Republic of Ireland. Irish Government means the one in Dublin. Use Irish Republic or the Republic according to context, but not Eire."
The Economist
"Ireland is simply Ireland. Although it is a republic, it is not the Republic of Ireland. Neither is it, in English, Eire."
BBC Radio
"Ireland is an island, comprising Northern Ireland and the Irish Republic."
BBC News style guide
Ireland is the official name of the state and should be used, except where it risks ambiguity. It may be helpful to make clear early on when we are talking about the island of Ireland rather than the country. The Republic of Ireland can be used when distinguishing Ireland from Northern Ireland, but 'the Irish Republic' should be avoided. When writing stories that cover both parts of the island we should make that clear (eg The numbers of songbirds are declining throughout Ireland). There are a number of all-Ireland organisations - religious, voluntary and sporting (eg the international rugby team selects players from both sides of the border and is called Ireland). Ireland should also be used for historical references related to the period before the creation of Northern Ireland in 1921.

== See also ==
- History of the Republic of Ireland
- Politics of the Republic of Ireland
- Alternative names for Northern Ireland
- Hibernia
- Ériu
