= United Nations Act 1946 =

Act of the Parliament of the United Kingdom

United Nations Act 1946 (Note: Section 2.)
- Act of Parliament
- Parliament of the United Kingdom
- Long title: An Act to enable effect to be given to certain provisions of the Charter of the United Nations.
- Citation: 9 & 10 Geo. 6. c. 45
- Territorial extent: United Kingdom (Note: Section 1(2).)

Dates
- Royal assent: 15 April 1946
- Commencement: 15 April 1946 (Note: The Acts of Parliament (Commencement) Act 1793.)

Other legislation
- Amended by: Burma Independence Act 1947; Statute Law Revision Act 1963; Zimbabwe Act 1979; Statute Law (Repeals) Act 1995; Scotland Act 1998

Status: Amended

Text of statute as originally enacted

Revised text of statute as amended

Text of the United Nations Act 1946 as in force today (including any amendments) within the United Kingdom, from legislation.gov.uk.

The United Nations Act 1946 (9 & 10 Geo. 6. c. 45) is an act of the Parliament of the United Kingdom which enables His Majesty's Government to implement resolutions under Article 41 of the United Nations Charter as Orders in Council. Thus Parliament delegated the power to enact such resolutions without the approval of Parliament. However, the prospective order must be laid before either Parliament or the Scottish Parliament. A similar mechanism was later used in the European Communities Act 1972 and the Terrorist Asset-Freezing etc. Act 2010.

== Provisions ==
The act contains two sections, though only section 1 has substantive content. Sub-section (1) allows the Crown to implement United Nations Security Council resolutions without the official approval of Parliament. Subsection (2) refers to the jurisdiction His Majesty's dominions, and has been amended over time as the United Kingdom has ceded legal control of its colonies. Subsection (3) says that these orders can be revoked or changed at will. Subsection (4) says that these orders must be laid before Parliament, but that they do not need to be voted on. Subsection (5) authorizes the implementation of these orders to come from general taxation.

As of July 2026, section 1 of the act reads:

1 Measures under Article 41.
1. If, under Article forty-one of the Charter of the United Nations signed at San Francisco on the twenty-sixth day of June, nineteen hundred and forty-five, (being the Article which relates to measures not involving the use of armed force) the Security Council of the United Nations call upon His Majesty's Government in the United Kingdom to apply any measures to give effect to any decision of that Council, His Majesty may by Order in Council make such provision as appears to Him necessary or expedient for enabling those measures to be effectively applied, including (without prejudice to the generality of the preceding words) provision for the apprehension, trial and punishment of persons offending against the Order.
2. Orders in Council made under this section may be so made as to extend to any part of His Majesty's dominions (other than Dominions within the meaning of the Statute of Westminster 1931, [and] territories administered by the Government of any such Dominion ...) and, to the extent that His Majesty has jurisdiction therein, to any other territory in which His Majesty has from time to time jurisdiction (other than territories which are being administered by the Government of such a Dominion as aforesaid ...).
3. Any Order in Council made under this section may be varied or revoked by a subsequent Order in Council.
4. Every Order in Council made under this section shall, forthwith after it is made be laid
  1. before Parliament; and
  2. if any provision made by the Order would, if it were included in an Act of the Scottish Parliament, be within the legislative competence of that Parliament, before that Parliament.
5. Any expenses incurred by His Majesty's Government in the United Kingdom in applying any such measures as are mentioned in this section shall be defrayed out of moneys provided by Parliament.

Section 1(4)(b) was added by the Scotland Act 1998; before then, there was no Scottish Parliament.

Section 2 states the short title of the act.

== Applications ==
In 1998, the Scottish Court in the Netherlands was established by the High Court of Justiciary (Proceedings in the Netherlands) (United Nations) Order 1998 which enacted the provisions of a treaty between the Government of the United Kingdom and Government of the Kingdom of the Netherlands. This enabled the High Court of Justiciary to sit in a bench trial of Abdelbaset al-Megrahi and Lamin Khalifah Fhimah for the bombing of Pan Am Flight 103, at Camp Zeist in the Netherlands.

Asset freezing by the Financial Sanctions Unit of the Bank of England was established by Al-Qa'ida and Taliban (United Nations Measures) Order 2002, The Al-Qaida and Taliban (United Nations Measures) Order 2006 and The Terrorism (United Nations Measures) Order 2006 to implement sanctions against terrorist suspects as designated by the UN Security Council Resolution 1267; which covered individuals and bodies associated with Al-Qaida, Osama bin Laden, or the Taliban.

On 27 January 2010 the Supreme Court of the United Kingdom, in the case of HM Treasury v Ahmed held that The Terrorism (United Nations Measures) Order 2006 and Article 3(1)(b) of The Al-Qaida and Taliban (United Nations Measures) Order 2006 were ultra vires and void, because the 1946 Act was not intended to authorise coercive measures which interfere with fundamental rights without Parliamentary scrutiny. On 4 February the Court refused to stay the effect of its judgement until Parliament could change the law. This led to Parliament passing the temporary Terrorist Asset-Freezing (Temporary Provisions) Act 2010 on 10 February 2010 to retrospectively legitimise the 2006 Order until Parliament had time to pass permanent legislation complying with the Court's ruling. Subsequently, Parliament passed the Terrorist Asset-Freezing etc. Act 2010. In 2016, responsibility for implementing the sanctions was transferred to the Office of Financial Sanctions Implementation of HM Treasury. Further powers and regulations were implemented by the Policing and Crime Act 2017.
