= Terrorist Asset-Freezing (Temporary Provisions) Act 2010 =

Act of the Parliament of the United Kingdom

Terrorist Asset-Freezing (Temporary Provisions) Act 2010 (Note: Section 3(1).)
- Act of Parliament
- Parliament of the United Kingdom
- Long title: An Act to make provision for the temporary validity of certain Orders in Council imposing financial restrictions on, and in relation to, persons suspected of involvement in terrorist activity; and for connected purposes.
- Citation: 2010 c. 2
- Introduced by: Alistair Darling (Commons)
- Territorial extent: England and Wales; Scotland; Northern Ireland; Channel Islands (in part); Isle of Man (in part); (Note: Section 3(3)–(4).)

Dates
- Royal assent: 10 February 2010
- Commencement: 10 February 2010 (Note: Section 3(2).)
- Repealed: 17 December 2010
Other legislation
Repealed by	Terrorist Asset-Freezing etc. Act 2010

Status: Repealed

Text of statute as originally enacted

Revised text of statute as amended

The Terrorist Asset-Freezing (Temporary Provisions) Act 2010 (c. 2) was an act of the Parliament of the United Kingdom that was in force from 10 February 2010 until its repeal on 17 December that same year by the Terrorist Asset-Freezing etc. Act 2010.

== Provisions ==
The act made provision for the temporary validity of certain Orders in Council imposing financial restrictions on, and in relation to, persons suspected of involvement in terrorist activity; and for connected purposes. These Orders in Council had been the chosen method of implementation of Resolution 1373 and the directives of the 1267 Committee. The legislation was introduced in the House of Commons by the Brown Government on 5 February 2010 and received royal assent on 10 February.

== Judgment ==
The act was passed following the HM Treasury v Ahmed ruling by the Supreme Court of the United Kingdom on 27 January 2010 that asset-freezing orders made under the United Nations Act 1946 (9 & 10 Geo. 6. c. 45) – specifically the Terrorism (United Nations Measures) Order 2009, the Terrorism (United Nations Measures) Order 2006, the Al-Qa’ida and Taliban (United Nations Measures) Order 2002, the Terrorism (United Nations Measures) Order 2001 and the Al-Qaida and Taliban (United Nations Measures) Order 2006 – were unlawful, because the 1946 act was not intended to authorise coercive measures which interfere with fundamental rights without parliamentary scrutiny:

There was no indication during the [February 1946] debates at Second Reading in either House that it was envisaged that the Security Council would find it necessary under article 41 to require states to impose restraints or take coercive measures against their own citizens. The question whether it would be appropriate, if it were to do so, for the Government to be given power to introduce such measures by Orders in Council in the manner envisaged by the Bill was not discussed.

Multiple persons, multiple orders and a forest of laws, Statutory Orders and UNSC resolutions were considered in the judgment. The applicants pleaded variously that the Treasury Orders were ultra vires for various reasons:

- illegality because it was passed without Parliamentary approval,
- lack of legal certainty and proportionality,
- the absence of procedures that enabled designated persons to challenge their designation,
- by virtue of section 6 of the Human Rights Act 1998 because they were incompatible with Article 8 of the European Convention on Human Rights and with article 1 of Protocol 1 of the ECHR,
- violated client's right of access to a court for an effective remedy.

Lord Phillips concluded that

Nobody should conclude that the result of these appeals constitutes judicial interference with the will of Parliament. On the contrary it upholds the supremacy of Parliament in deciding whether or not measures should be imposed that affect the fundamental rights of those in this country.

== Legislation ==
When the court refused to stay its judgement on 4 February, the act was passed to retrospectively validate the orders until Parliament could pass new asset-freezing legislation which complied with the court's judgement.

Speaking in the House of Commons on 8 February, Liberal Democrat MP David Heath said of the bill:

[T]he legislation is before us because the Government have been found to be acting ultra vires and failing to secure proper parliamentary approval ... However, the arrogance of this Government and, in particular, the Treasury means that they do not understand what Parliament is for, and they do not understand the proper scrutiny of Bills.

== Subsequent developments ==
The whole act was repealed by section 55(1) of, and part I of schedule 2 to, the Terrorist Asset-Freezing etc. Act 2010, which came into force on 17 December 2010. The act was a full legislative text with which to implement Resolution 1373.

== See also ==
- Terrorism Acts
- Council Regulation (EC) No 881/2002
- Interpol notice
- Rules Publication Act 1893
- Hani al-Sibai
