= Sustainable Communities Act 2007 =

Act of the Parliament of the United Kingdom

Sustainable Communities Act 2007 (Note: Section 10(1).)
- Act of Parliament
- Parliament of the United Kingdom
- Long title: An Act to make provision about promoting the sustainability of local communities; and for connected purposes.
- Citation: 2007 c. 23
- Introduced by: Nick Hurd (private member's bill) (Commons); Lord Marlesford (Lords)
- Territorial extent: England and Wales (Note: Section 10(2).)

Dates
- Royal assent: 23 October 2007
- Commencement: 23 October 2007 (Note: Section 4(b) of the Interpretation Act 1978.)
Other legislation
Amended by	Sustainable Communities Act 2007 (Amendment) Act 2010; Public Bodies Act 2011; Deregulation Act 2015

Status: Partially repealed

History of passage through Parliament

Text of statute as originally enacted

Text of the Sustainable Communities Act 2007 as in force today (including any amendments) within the United Kingdom, from legislation.gov.uk.

The Sustainable Communities Act 2007 (c. 23) is an act of the Parliament of the United Kingdom. The bill for this act was a private member's bill.

The Sustainable Communities Act 2007 represents the campaign success by Local Works, a UK coalition of over 100 national organisations, to introduce legislation that will help reverse the trend of community decline, also called 'Ghost Town Britain'. Ghost Town Britain refers to the ongoing loss of local facilities and services including, amongst others: shops, markets, Post Offices, pubs, bank branches and health centres, etc. The term 'Ghost Town Britain' was initially coined by the British think-tank the New Economics Foundation.

The act was amended by the Sustainable Communities Act 2007 (Amendment) Act 2010.

== How the act works ==
The Sustainable Communities Act 2007 is an act of the Parliament of the United Kingdom. Brought to Parliament as a private member's bill, it received royal assent on 23 October 2007. The Sustainable Communities Act 2007 represents the campaign success by Local Works, a UK coalition of over 100 national organisations to introduce legislation that will help reverse the trend of community decline, also called 'Ghost Town Britain'.

Ghost Town Britain refers to the ongoing loss of local facilities and services including, amongst others: shops, markets, Post Offices, pubs, bank branches and health centres, etc. The term 'Ghost Town Britain' was initially coined by the British think-tank the New Economics Foundation. The Sustainable Communities Act 2007 was amended in 2010 when the Sustainable Communities Act 2007 (Amendment) Act 2010 passed through Parliament and became law on 8 April 2010.

The act sets up a process, by which councils can drive government action. Councils are given the power to make proposals to the Secretary of State, as to how government can 'assist councils in promoting the sustainability of local communities'. The SoS is then under a duty to 'reach agreement' with councils, via their representative body, the Local Government Association (the LGA – called 'the selector' in the act) on which proposals will be given priority. The act seeks to open up the work of local communities to greater transparency by including 'local people' in the proposal process. The Act specifies that when making their proposals to the SoS, councils must involve 'local people' by setting up, or recognising if they already exist, 'panels of representatives of local people' (or citizens' panels). Councils then must 'reach agreement' (not just consult) with those panels regarding ideas for proposals to put to the SoS for government action.

Under the act, local sustainability has four measurements:

1. Thriving local regeneration
2. Environmental protection
3. Social inclusion
4. Active democratic participation

== Proposals and the 'first round' under the act ==
The local sustainability strategies will state ways in which community decline is to be reversed and local sustainability is to be created. This could include measures to promote local shops and services, local jobs and local businesses; measures to reduce social exclusion and increase active citizenship; as well as measures to improve the local environment.

On 14 October 2008 the Secretary of State (Hazel Blears) invited councils (district, borough, city, unitary and county) to make proposals to central government, via the LGA, by 31 July 2009 on how central government can help promote local sustainability. One hundred Local Authorities 'opted in' to the first round of the Act (out of the 468 in total). From this opt in, 300 proposals reached the LGA, and of these 199 were put forward to the then Labour government for consideration. In December 2010, a year after the proposals had been submitted by the selector, the new coalition government Secretary of State responded. Around half of the proposals were "implemented" or "taken forward".

== See also ==
- Sustainable Communities Plan
- Ghost Town Britain: The 2002 report by the New Economics Foundation
- Localism Act 2011
