= Bank payroll tax =

The bank payroll tax was a nonrecurring case of specific tax regime that was set to temporarily change the circumstances under which relevant employees of taxable companies (namely banks) obtained their bonuses in United Kingdom. This tax applied to banks which paid bankers bonuses over £25 000 and the tax was charged at the rate of 50%. As stated in Finance Act 2010 schedule 1 part 1 “Bank payroll tax is chargeable on the aggregate of the amounts of chargeable relevant remuneration awarded during the chargeable period or in respect of relevant banking employees of a taxable company by reason of their employment as relevant banking employees.“ It was paid by the bank directly to HM Revenue and Customs (HMRC) and the chargeable period was from 9 December 2009 to 5 April 2010. Bank payroll tax was payable by taxable companies on or before 31 August 2010.

== Terms definition ==
Definitions depicted below were taken from the Finance Act 2010, but none of these terms is described in its full extent as it was written in the document mentioned earlier. These selected terms were applied specifically in context of the bank payroll tax.

=== Taxable company ===
Taxable company means “a company which is a UK resident bank or a relevant foreign bank. “ As a taxable company we can also consider an institution that „is a building society or is a UK resident investment company, or a UK resident financial trading company, which is a member of the same group as a building society. “

=== Relevant remuneration ===
Relevant remuneration in context of this particular act means “anything that constitutes earnings in relation to the employee’s employment by the taxable company as a relevant banking employee, or while not constituting earnings, constitutes a benefit provided by reason of that employment. Whether or not the relevant banking employee is chargeable to income tax in respect of anything is irrelevant in determining whether or not it is relevant remuneration. Excluded remuneration is not relevant remuneration. “

=== Excluded remuneration ===
Excluded remuneration in relation to bank payroll tax means “anything which is regular salary, wages, a regular benefit or anything in the case of which a contractual obligation to pay or provide it to or in respect of the employee concerned arose before the beginning of the chargeable period.” As Excluded remuneration is also perceived “any shares awarded under an approved share incentive plan. “ More broadly “a contractual obligation to pay or provide something is taken to arise for those purposes even if payment or provision of it is dependent on compliance by the employee with any conditions. “

=== Awarded ===
This term describes exact cases which are considered as bonuses (“relevant remuneration”) to relevant employee in relation to the bank payroll tax. Those awards are specified via chargeable period. “Relevant remuneration is awarded during the chargeable period if a contractual obligation to pay or provide it arises during the chargeable period, or the relevant remuneration is paid or provided during the chargeable period without any such obligation having arisen during the chargeable period. “ On the other hand, there are some tax exceptions that are demarcated via relevant remuneration. “Relevant remuneration is not to be taken to be awarded during the chargeable period (…) if it is required to be paid or provided at intervals, it is to be paid or provided in respect of contribution, performance or similar considerations only for times after the end of the chargeable period, and the reduction or elimination of a liability to bank payroll tax is not the main purpose or one of the main purposes of any person in assuming the obligation to pay or provide it. “

=== Amount of remuneration ===
Amount of remuneration briefly means any relevant remuneration that is paid to an employee of the bank. Amount of relevant remuneration is

1. if it is money, its amount when awarded

2. if it is money's worth, the amount of the money's worth when awarded

3. if it is a benefit not constituting earnings, the cost of providing it

=== The chargeable period ===
The chargeable period was the period beginning at 12.30 pm on 9 December 2009, and ending with 5 April 2010 according to Financial Act 2010.

=== Relevant banking employee ===
Relevant banking employee is very broad term which determines employees that are subjects to the bank payroll tax. More specifically “an employee of a taxable company is a relevant banking employee of the taxable company if the employment in which the employee is employed by the taxable company is a banking employment, and either— (i) the employee is resident in the United Kingdom in the tax year 2009-10, or (ii) the duties of the banking employment are at any time in that tax year performed wholly or partly in the United Kingdom.“

== Purpose ==
According to the Government the main aim was to "encourage banks to consider their capital position and make appropriate risk-adjustments when settling the level of bonus payments." This was probably a precaution movement to make bankers adjust their salaries and especially their bonuses. Many legislators also speculated that this whole rare taxation modification was more likely political move rather than purely economic decision.

== The bank payroll tax evasion ==
Many banks also found ways around the bank payroll tax. Some banks decided to cut into dividends to retain top staff and therefore penalize investors in the process. It is also possible that the tax sped up the flow of traders and investors from banks to less-regulated entities back then.

It is also important to note that if banks did not award bonuses in the chargeable period, then no charge arose, which was a choice openly given by the Treasury to the banks. Bank Payroll Tax also did not affect the income tax or national insurance liabilities of bank employees.

== Criticism and confusions ==
From the beginning of the application of the bank payroll tax there was quite a lot of confusion about proper taxation. On 18 December, HMRC released a statement which additionally clarified, which entities would apply to this specific tax. One important elucidation was that the definition of banking group in the bank payroll tax Schedule “will be amended so that no group can be treated as a banking group simply because it includes a group member with banking activity,” more broadly if that activity "is a minor activity within the group as a whole". As a result, although any member of such a group which is itself a bank (under the revised definitions) will still be subject to the bank payroll tax, other group members will not be, even if they are "investment companies" or "financial trading companies" (as defined in the bank payroll tax Schedule) as HMRC stated in its statement.

Another highly debated topic was whether the bank payroll tax will be due on any bonuses paid to non-banking staff in particular highly paid professionals (such as IT professionals, in-house lawyers or any other support staff) working for banks and other liable firms, but who are not themselves bankers, brokers, traders or fulfilling a similar role. Unfortunately, HMRC’s press release on 21 December 2009 did not sufficiently clarified whether such bonuses may or may not give rise to a bank payroll tax liability, depending on whether, on the basis of their duties, the payee is a "relevant banking employee" as defined in the bank payroll tax Schedule. This was not the best clarification and it did not clear up the major confusion about this issue.

== See also ==
- Taxation in the United Kingdom
- UK labour law
