= London Olympic Games and Paralympic Games Act 2006 =

Act of the Parliament of the United Kingdom

London Olympic Games and Paralympic Games Act 2006 (Note: Section 42.)
- Act of Parliament
- Parliament of the United Kingdom
- Long title: An Act to make provision in connection with the Olympic Games and Paralympic Games that are to take place in London in the year 2012; to amend the Olympic Symbol etc. (Protection) Act 1995; and for connected purposes.
- Citation: 2006 c. 12
- Territorial extent: United Kingdom (Note: Section 41.)

Dates
- Royal assent: 30 March 2006
- Commencement: Various (Note: Section 40.)
Other legislation
Amends	Olympic Symbol etc. (Protection) Act 1995
Amended by	Transfer of Functions (Olympics and Paralympics) Order 2007; Transfer of Tribunal Functions (Lands Tribunal and Miscellaneous Amendments) Order 2009; Secretary of State for Culture, Olympics, Media and Sport Order 2010; Police Reform and Social Responsibility Act 2011; Localism Act 2011; London Olympic Games and Paralympic Games (Amendment) Act 2011; Public Bodies Act 2011; Equality Act 2010 (Public Authorities and Consequential and Supplementary Amendments) Order 2011; Olympic Delivery Authority (Dissolution) Order 2014

Status: Partially repealed

Text of statute as originally enacted

Text of the London Olympic Games and Paralympic Games Act 2006 as in force today (including any amendments) within the United Kingdom, from legislation.gov.uk.

London Olympic Games and Paralympic Games Act 2006

The London Olympic Games and Paralympic Games Act 2006 (c. 12) is an act of the Parliament of the United Kingdom. It was passed following the decision of the International Olympic Committee to stage the 2012 Summer Olympics in London. It was intended to facilitate the organisation of the Games, and to aid the UK in compliance with its responsibilities and obligations.

== Legislative passage ==
The bill was introduced eight days after London was successful in being chosen to host the 2012 Summer Olympics.

== Provisions ==
The act contains four main provisions: the establishing of the Olympic Delivery Authority, responsible for organising the games, the creation of an Olympic Transport Plan for the games, the regulation of advertising near the Games by the Secretary of State, and the regulation of street trading near the Games, also by the Secretary of State.

=== Olympic Delivery Authority ===
The act created the Olympic Delivery Authority to prepare for the Games, and gives it various abilities, such as: acquiring, owning and disposing of lands, entering into contracts, and applying for planning permission. It also had some powers under the Local Government, Planning and Land Act 1980.

=== Section 10 – Olympic Transport Plan ===
The Olympic Delivery Authority is required by the act to draw up a plan for transport for the Games, having consulted with various interested parties. Once the plan has been drawn up, various parties are required to co-operate with it, including the local highway authority, local street authority and local traffic authorities concerned, who can ultimately be compelled by the Secretary of State to do so.

=== Advertising and street trading regulation ===
The act grants to the Secretary of State the power to regulate advertising and street trading (trading on a highway or other public place) in the vicinity of Olympic events as he or she sees fit, violations of which regulations are punishable by a fine.

3(1)For the purpose of considering whether a person has infringed the London Olympics association right a court may, in particular, take account of his use of a combination of expressions of a kind specified in sub-paragraph (2).
(2)The combinations referred to in sub-paragraph (1) are combinations of— (a)any of the expressions in the first group, with (b)any of the expressions in the second group or any of the other expressions in the first group.
(3)The following expressions form the first group for the purposes of sub-paragraph (2)— “games”, Two Thousand and Twelve” “2012” and “twenty twelve”.
(4)The following expressions form the second group for the purposes of sub-paragraph (2)— gold, silver, bronze, London, medals, sponsor, and summer.

The act establishes the London Olympic Association Right which grants games' organisers the power to grant licences to authorised sponsors to use the symbols, words and logos of the event.

=== Section 40 – Commencement and duration ===
The following orders have been made under this section:

- The London Olympic Games and Paralympic Games Act 2006 (Commencement No. 1) Order 2006 (S.I. 2006/1118 (C. 38))
- The London Olympic Games and Paralympic Games Act 2006 (Commencement No. 2) Order 2007 (S.I. 2007/1064 (C. 44))
- The London Olympic Games and Paralympic Games Act 2006 (Commencement No. 3) Order 2009 (S.I. 2009/2577 (C. 111))
- The London Olympic Games and Paralympic Games Act 2006 (Commencement) (Scotland) Order 2006 (S.S.I. 2006/611 (C. 47))

== Amendment ==
The act was amended by the London Olympic Games and Paralympic Games (Amendment) Act 2011. The 2011 act increased the maximum fine for ticket touting from £5,000 to £20,000. The 2011 act allowed firms to take deliveries outside of specific hours, bypassing environmental regulations.

== Reception ==
The Institute of Practitioners in Advertising described the legislation as too broad and disproportionate.
