= Fiscal Responsibility Act 2010 =

Act of the Parliament of the United Kingdom

Fiscal Responsibility Act 2010 (Note: Section 6.)
- Act of Parliament
- Parliament of the United Kingdom
- Long title: An Act to make provision for and in connection with the imposition of duties for securing sound public finances.
- Citation: 2010 c. 3
- Introduced by: Alistair Darling, Chancellor of the Exchequer (Commons); Lord Myners, Financial Services Secretary to the Treasury (Lords)
- Territorial extent: United Kingdom

Dates
- Royal assent: 10 February 2010
- Commencement: 10 February 2010 (Note: Section 4(b) of the Interpretation Act 1978.)
- Repealed: 23 March 2011
Other legislation
Repealed by	Budget Responsibility and National Audit Act 2011

Status: Repealed

History of passage through Parliament

Text of statute as originally enacted

Revised text of statute as amended

The Fiscal Responsibility Act 2010 (c. 3) was an act of the Parliament of the United Kingdom that received royal assent on 10 February 2010. The act was repealed by section 10(c) of the Budget Responsibility and National Audit Act 2011 on 23 March 2011.

== Legislative passage ==
It was first presented (first reading) in the House of Commons on 10 December 2009 and received its third reading on 20 January 2010. It was first read in the House of Lords on 21 January 2010 and received its second and third readings on 10 February 2010.

== Provisions ==
The act committed the government to reducing the budget deficit. The act created a parliamentary procedure for approving medium-term fiscal plans.

== Reception ==
A researcher for the Institute for Fiscal Studies, Gemma Tetlow, criticised the legislation for not providing "credibility".

== Subsequent developments ==
The whole act was repealed, with effect from 23 March 2011, by section 10(c) of the Budget Responsibility and National Audit Act 2011.
