= Armed Forces Act 2011 =

Act of the Parliament of the United Kingdom

Armed Forces Act 2011 (Note: Section 34.)
- Act of Parliament
- Parliament of the United Kingdom
- Long title: An Act to continue the Armed Forces Act 2006 (AFA 2006); to amend that Act and other enactments relating to the armed forces and the Ministry of Defence Police; to amend the Visiting Forces Act 1952; to enable judge advocates to sit in civilian courts; to repeal the Naval Medical Compassionate Fund Act 1915; and for connected purposes.
- Citation: 2011 c. 18
- Introduced by: Liam Fox MP (Commons); Lord Astor of Hever (Lords)
- Territorial extent: United Kingdom

Dates
- Royal assent: 3 November 2011
- Commencement: 3 November 2011; 3 February 2011; Various; (Note: Section 32.)
Other legislation
Amends	Military Lands Act 1892; Senior Courts Act 1981; Criminal Justice and Immigration Act 2008
Repeals/revokes	Naval Medical Compassionate Fund Act 1915
Amended by	Armed Forces (Service Complaints and Financial Assistance) Act 2015; Armed Forces Act 2016
Relates to	Armed Forces Act 2006

Status: Amended

Text of statute as originally enacted

Revised text of statute as amended

The Armed Forces Act 2011 (c. 18) is an act of the Parliament of the United Kingdom.

== Provisions ==
It part of a series of acts to provide a legislative framework for the UK Armed Forces. The act gave the armed forces the legal authority to exist for another five years (under the terms of the Declaration of Right).

Its most major element was to establish a requirement for the Secretary of State for Defence to make an annual report to Parliament on the implementation of the Armed Forces Covenant. It also made some revisions to the Armed Forces Act 2006, and provisions covering the three service police forces and the Ministry of Defence Police.

== Ping-pong ==
Stage	Date	Hansard Reference	Notes
Programme (No. 3) motion: House of Commons, and Commons Consideration of Lords' Amendments	19 Oct 2011	Columns 1008-1021	
Lord's Consideration of Commons Reason	26 Oct 2011	Columns 856-863	

== Royal assent ==
The bill was given royal assent (and thus became an act) on 3 November 2011.

== Reception ==
The director general of the Royal British Legion, Chris Simpkins, criticised the legislation describing it as a "U-turn" from the government's original commitment, due to the lack of an external body to monitor implementation of the covenant. Simpkins described it as the Ministry of Defence monitoring itself.
