= Gift Aid =

UK tax incentive

Gift Aid is a UK tax incentive that enables tax-effective giving by individuals to charities in the United Kingdom. It can be categorised into individual gift aid (income tax relief for cash gifts to charity by individuals) and corporate gift aid (corporation tax relief for cash gifts to charity by companies). Gift Aid was introduced in the Finance Act 1990 for donations given after 1 October 1990, but was originally limited to cash gifts of £600 or more. This threshold was successively reduced in April 2000 when the policy was substantially revised and the minimum donation limit removed entirely. A similar policy applies to charitable donations by companies that are subject to the UK corporation tax.

Gift Aid was originally intended for cash donations only. However, since 2006, HMRC compliant systems have been introduced to allow tax on the income earned by charity shops, acting as an agent for a donor, to be reclaimed. In order for the charity to operate effectively they will need HMRC-approved systems to be able to record and track the progress of each item from receipt to sale and confirm with the donor that the donation should still go ahead. In the financial year 2021/22, Gift Aid to charities amounted to £1.3bn, a fall of 3% from the previous year largely attributed to HMRC putting on hold more claims than usual in March 2022 for extra risk assessment.

The Finance Act 2010 extended Gift Aid to charities within European Economic Area member states, rather than those just inside the UK. This provision was repealed by the Finance (No. 2) 2023 Act, again limiting Gift Aid to UK charities from April 2024.

== Details ==
Gift Aid allows individuals who are subject to UK income tax to complete a simple, short declaration that they are a UK taxpayer. Any cash donations that the taxpayer makes to the charity after making a declaration are treated as being made after deduction of income tax at the basic rate (20% in 2011), and the charity can reclaim the basic rate income tax paid on the gift from HMRC. For a basic-rate taxpayer, this adds 25% to the value of any gift made under Gift Aid. Higher-rate taxpayers can claim income tax relief, above and beyond the amount claimed directly by the charities. The rate of the relief for higher-rate taxpayers in 2011 is usually 20%, the difference between the basic rate (20%) and the higher rate (40%) of income tax, although recipients of dividend income (taxed at 10% and 32.5%) can achieve a higher rate of tax relief (22.5%).

Originally, declarations had to be made in writing. Declarations can now be made orally, but the charity must confirm the declaration in writing and keep a copy of the confirmation. If the taxpayer incorrectly makes a declaration, the charity is still able to reclaim the tax that should have been paid on the gift.

Gift Aid can only be reclaimed on money donated by UK taxpayers. Non-UK taxpayers can make donations. However, as HMRC is making payment to the charity but there has been no source tax paid by the donor, HMRC has power to collect the equivalent sum from the donor.

The first charity to introduce Gift Aid on donated goods – where the tax is reclaimed on the value of the goods when sold – was Sue Ryder Care, using Eproductive Ltd's EPR Gift Aid system.

Gift Aid is only for donations by the donor. It cannot be claimed on other people's donations – for example, if someone collects money from several people, each person would have to make a Gift Aid declaration for their portion. It also cannot be claimed for money where the donor received something in return, e.g. purchasing goods from a charity store, or buying a ticket in a charity raffle, as these are not strictly donations. In the case of donated goods, Gift Aid can still be claimed via the donor of the goods, not the purchaser.

== A practical example ==
Mr Burns donates £100 to charity.

Mr Burns is a higher-rate taxpayer, paying 40% income tax on part of their income. He has made a Gift Aid declaration to the charity. As a result:

- The £100.00 gift is treated as being made after deduction of basic rate tax at 20%. The gross value of the gift before tax is £125 (£100 / (100% − 20%)) – this is the amount of money a basic rate taxpayer would need to earn to receive £100.00 after tax.
- The charity can claim the 20% of basic rate tax (£125 × 20% = £25) that the taxpayer is treated as having paid on the gross value of the gift. This is effectively an extra 25% on top of the value of the £100.00 donation.
- Because he is a higher-rate taxpayer, Mr Burns can claim back the remaining 20% of income tax that he paid on the gross value of the gift (the 40% income tax which he paid, less the 20% claimed by the charity). He would make this claim in his tax return. This amounts to a repayment of £25 on the £100 donation (£125 × (40% − 20%)).

=== The benefits to the charity ===
For 2008–2011 (when the basic rate of income tax was higher than 20%):

Donation	£100
Refund from HMRC	£25
Supplement from HMRC	£3.21
Total to charity	£128.21

After 2011

Donation	£100
Refund from HMRC	£25
Total to charity	£125

=== The cost to the donor ===
Since 6 April 2008 (higher rate taxpayers only):

Donation	£100
Refund from HMRC in due course	−£25
Total cost to Mr Burns	£75

This means that for a net donation of £75 from Mr Burns, the charity would receive a benefit of £125.

If Mr Burns paid income tax at the additional rate (45%), the cost to him would be further reduced. He would be entitled to reclaim the remaining 25% of income tax which he paid on the gross value of the gift (the 45% income tax which he paid, less the 20% claimed by the charity). This would amount to a repayment of £31.25 on the £100 donation (£125 × (45% − 20%)). This would mean that for a net donation of £68.75 from Mr Burns, the charity would receive a benefit of £125.

The cost of the donation to a basic rate taxpayer is unaffected, as a basic rate taxpayer cannot reclaim any additional tax.

=== Revenue to HMRC ===
Not all monies paid to HMRC during this transaction are refunded.

- Any National Insurance contributions paid by the employer and employee are not refunded.
- Although all income tax paid by the higher-rate taxpayer is refunded, the way this is implemented has the effect of making the cost of the donation smaller than the higher-rate taxpayer may have intended as the following example illustrates:

Total received by charity	£125.00	Gross income before taxes	£125.00
Refund to charity from HMRC	−£25.00	Income tax paid by giver at higher rate (40%)	−£50.00
Amount paid to charity	=£100	Net income received by giver before gift	=£75.00
Refund to the giver from HMRC	−£25.00	Cost of donation to giver	−£75.00
Cost of donation to giver	−£75.00	Difference kept by HMRC	=£0.00

The giver has only really donated £75 of net income, despite having made a payment of £100.

- The additional £25 received by the charity is made up from the giver's income tax contributions. If the charity does not reclaim this money, it stays with the Treasury.
- The giver additionally reduces their tax liability by £25. If the giver does not submit a properly completed self-assessment, this refund stays with the Treasury.

== Gift Aid Small Donations Scheme ==
The Gift Aid Small Donations Scheme (GASDS) allows charities to claim 25% on cash donations of £30 or less and contactless card donations of £30 or less collected on or after 6 April 2019. The legislation is in the Small Charitable Donations Act 2012 ("SCDA") and the Small Charitable Donations Regulations 2013 ("SCDR"). From 6 April 2016, a charity can claim up to £2,000 in a tax year or £1,250 for earlier years.

== Gift Aid It Campaign ==
The Gift Aid It logo created by the Giving Campaign

To promote the Gift Aid incentive (amongst other activities), the UK Government created "The Giving Campaign" in June 2001. The Giving Campaign was in charge of the "Gift Aid" brand, a brand which is still used to this day despite closing in 2004.
