= Finance Act 2010 =

Act of the Parliament of the United Kingdom

Finance Act 2010 (Note: Section 70.)
- Act of Parliament
- Parliament of the United Kingdom
- Long title: An Act to grant certain duties, to alter other duties, and to amend the law relating to the National Debt and the Public Revenue, and to make further provision in connection with finance.
- Citation: 2010 c. 13
- Territorial extent: United Kingdom

Dates
- Royal assent: 8 April 2010
- Commencement: 8 April 2010 (Note: Section 4(b) of the Interpretation Act 1978.)
Other legislation
Amends	Inheritance Tax Act 1984; Value Added Tax Act 1994; Capital Allowances Act 2001
Amended by	Charities Act 2011; Co-operative and Community Benefit Societies Act 2014; Finance Act 2015

Status: Amended

History of passage through Parliament

Text of statute as originally enacted

Revised text of statute as amended

The Finance Act 2010 (c. 13) is an act of the Parliament of the United Kingdom enacting the March 2010 United Kingdom budget. The Chancellor of the Exchequer delivers the annual budget speech outlining changes in spending, tax, duty and other financial matters. However, in 2010 there was a second budget in June. The respective year's Finance Act is the mechanism to enact the changes. Levels of excise duties, value-added tax, income tax, corporation tax and capital gains tax) are often modified.

The rules governing the various taxation methods are contained within the relevant taxation acts. (For instance Capital Gains Tax legislation is contained within Taxation of Chargeable Gains Act 1992). The Finance Act details amendments to be made to each one of these acts.

== Provisions ==
Charitable tax benefits (for example Gift Aid) were extended to charities within EU member states, Norway and Iceland, rather than those just inside the UK.
