= Sustainable Communities Act 2007 (Amendment) Act 2010 =

Act of the Parliament of the United Kingdom

Sustainable Communities Act 2007 (Amendment) Act 2010 (Note: Section 3(1).)
- Act of Parliament
- Parliament of the United Kingdom
- Long title: An Act to amend the Sustainable Communities Act 2007.
- Citation: 2010 c. 21
- Introduced by: Alistair Burt (Commons); Lord Whitty (Lords)
- Territorial extent: England and Wales (Note: Section 3(3).)

Dates
- Royal assent: 8 April 2010
- Commencement: 8 June 2010 (Note: Section 3(2).)
Other legislation
Amends	Sustainable Communities Act 2007

Status: Current legislation

History of passage through Parliament

Text of statute as originally enacted

Revised text of statute as amended

The Sustainable Communities Act 2007 (Amendment) Act 2010 (c. 21) is an act of the Parliament of the United Kingdom to amend the Sustainable Communities Act 2007.

== Passage ==
Alistair Burt MP (Conservative) introduced the Sustainable Communities Act Amendment Bill into Parliament. The bill received wide cross party support being co-sponsored by David Drew MP (Labour) and Julia Goldsworthy MP (Liberal Democrat). The act principally seeks to set a deadline and regulations for the Secretary of State to initiate the next round of proposals from local authorities for enhancing the sustainability of local communities. The regulations also cover parish council involvement and the role of local petitioning. There is also provision for greater flexibility in decision-making on proposals.

== Provisions ==
- Rolling programme for proposals – Accordingly, clause 2(2) on subsequent invitations and proposed new section 5B on the power to make regulations provide the opportunity to set a date both by which the next round should commence and for regulations to come forward to ensure that this will be a continuing process.
- Involves parish and town councils – The second aim of clause 2 was to include parish and town councils. As town councils are technically and legally part of the parish council domain, there was therefore no need to put the term "town council" in the original bill. Where councils use the processes in the 2007 Act, parish and town councils have to be represented on the citizens’ panels that they are required to establish in order to involve and reach agreement with their electors on the ideas for action to be put to the Secretary of State (SoS). It also enables county associations of parish and town councils to be directly involved in the process and to put suggestions for local action to the SoS.
- Involving citizens - The act aims to involve citizens by enabling them to petition for a referendum on issues if their council refuses to use the Act. There is a requirement of 5% of electors which has to be met before a referendum can be held and if successful the council must opt into the 2007 act.

== Further regulations ==
In July 2012, new regulations came into force for the act, affirming the rights of local people to participate in the act, introducing a 6-month time limit for government to respond, and making Local Works part of the Selector. The government now allows individuals to submit a proposal under the act, on their 'Barrier Busting' website.

Six councils have made proposals under the act since the new regulations came into force.
