= Equitable Life (Payments) Act 2010 =

Act of the Parliament of the United Kingdom

Equitable Life (Payments) Act 2010 (Note: Section 2.)
- Act of Parliament
- Parliament of the United Kingdom
- Long title: An Act to provide finance for payments in cases where persons have been adversely affected by maladministration in the regulation before December 2001 of the Equitable Life Assurance Society; and for connected purposes.
- Citation: 2010 c. 34
- Introduced by: Mark Hoban (Commons); Lord Sassoon (Lords)
- Territorial extent: United Kingdom

Dates
- Royal assent: 16 December 2010
- Commencement: 16 December 2010 (Note: Section 4(b) of the Interpretation Act 1978.)
Other legislation
Relates to	Taxation of Equitable Life (Payments) Order 2011

Status: Current legislation

History of passage through Parliament

Text of statute as originally enacted

Text of the Equitable Life (Payments) Act 2010 as in force today (including any amendments) within the United Kingdom, from legislation.gov.uk.

The Equitable Life (Payments) Act 2010 (c. 34) is an act of the Parliament of the United Kingdom. It authorises HM Treasury to make payments, paid for out of money provided by Parliament, to policyholders adversely affected by maladministration in the regulation of The Equitable Life Assurance Society before December 2001.
