= Loans to Ireland Act 2010 =

Act of the Parliament of the United Kingdom

Loans to Ireland Act 2010 (Note: Section 3(1).)
- Act of Parliament
- Parliament of the United Kingdom
- Long title: An Act to make provision in connection with the making of loans to Ireland by the United Kingdom.
- Citation: 2010 c. 41
- Introduced by: George Osborne MP, Chancellor of the Exchequer (Commons); Lord Sassoon (Lords)
- Territorial extent: United Kingdom (Note: Section 3(3).)

Dates
- Royal assent: 21 December 2010
- Commencement: 21 December 2010 (Note: Section 3(2).)

Status: Spent

History of passage through Parliament

Text of statute as originally enacted

Text of the Loans to Ireland Act 2010 as in force today (including any amendments) within the United Kingdom, from legislation.gov.uk.

The Loans to Ireland Act 2010 (c. 41) is an act of the Parliament of the United Kingdom. The act allows HM Treasury to loan up to £3,250 million (£3.25 billion; €3,835 million/€3.84 billion) (Note: Approximation, on 21 December 2010.) to Ireland, as part of an €85 billion European Union bailout package. The final disbursement of the loan was made on 26 September 2013. The final repayment of the loan by Ireland was made, on schedule, on 26 March 2021.

== Parliamentary passage ==
The bill was introduced on 9 December 2010 and passed through all stages in the House of Commons on 15 December. This is unusual, and only ever occurs with short, emergency legislation. As a money bill, it then passed through the House of Lords without detailed consideration in Committee, and passed through the second and third readings on 21 December.

== Provisions ==
The act allows HM Treasury, between 9 December 2010 and 8 December 2015, to make loans to Ireland up to a total of £3.25 billion. It also allows for this limit to be increased by statutory instrument, which would require the approval of the House of Commons (though not if it is raised simply to take into account any exchange rate fluctuations between the pound and the euro that might occur between 9 December 2010 and 20 January 2011).

The act also requires the Treasury to publish a report about the loans as soon as is practicable after 31 March 2011 (and every six months thereafter). The report must include details of:

- any payments made by the Treasury by way of a loan in that period,
- any sums received by the Treasury in that period by way of repayment of principal or the payment of interest in respect of a loan,
- the aggregate amount of principal and interest in respect of loans which is outstanding at the end of that period,
- the remaining term of each loan which is outstanding at the end of that period, and
- the original term of each loan in respect of which a payment was made by the Treasury by way of a loan in that period.

Once the loans are fully repaid, no report has to be made.

== Name for Irish State ==
The British and Irish governments had a dispute over their respective states' names that lasted about 60 years. It ended with the conclusion of the Belfast Agreement (commonly known as the Good Friday Agreement) in 1998. Both governments now respect each side's name. The act, given its title, is probably the clearest example of this rapprochement in British legislation. If equivalent legislation had been enacted before 1998, it would probably have been called the "Loans to the Republic of Ireland Act" but instead, the Irish side's official name is used throughout.
