= Kent County Council (Filming on Highways) Act 2010 =

Local Act of Parliament of the United Kingdom

- Act of Parliament
- Parliament of the United Kingdom
- Long title: An Act to confer powers on Kent County Council in relation to filming on highways; and for related purposes
- Citation: 2010 c. iv
- Territorial extent: Kent

Dates
- Royal assent: 27 July 2010

Status: Current legislation

Text of statute as originally enacted

Text of the Kent County Council (Filming on Highways) Act 2010 as in force today (including any amendments) within the United Kingdom, from legislation.gov.uk.

The Kent County Council (Filming on Highways) Act 2010 (c. iv) is a local act of the Parliament of the United Kingdom that confers powers to Kent County Council relating to filming on highways. The act received royal assent on 27 July 2010. The passing of the act meant that the Kent became the first authority outside of London to gain legal powers to enforce the temporary closure of roads to be used as film locations. The act removed an uncertainty regarding provisions over the Road Traffic Regulation Act 1984 and allows up to six film orders to be issued on any road in Kent in a calendar year. Any order made remains in force for a maximum of seven days with notices lasting twenty-four hours and prevents film crews from being prosecuted for obstructing a stretch of road under the Highways Act 1980.
