= Budget Responsibility and National Audit Act 2011 =

Act of the Parliament of the United Kingdom

Budget Responsibility and National Audit Act 2011 (Note: Section 31.)
- Act of Parliament
- Parliament of the United Kingdom
- Long title: An Act to make provision for a Charter for Budget Responsibility and for the publication of Financial Statements and Budget Reports; to establish the Office for Budget Responsibility; to make provision about the Comptroller and Auditor General and to establish a body corporate called the National Audit Office; to amend Schedules 5 and 7 to the Government of Wales Act 2006 in relation to the Auditor General for Wales; and for connected purposes.
- Citation: 2011 c. 4
- Introduced by: Justine Greening, Economic Secretary to the Treasury (Commons); Lord Sassoon, Commercial Secretary to the Treasury (Lords)
- Territorial extent: England and Wales; Scotland; Northern Ireland; (Note: Section 30.)

Dates
- Royal assent: 22 March 2011
- Commencement: 23 March 2011; 4 April 2011; (Note: Section 29.)
Other legislation
Amends	House of Commons Disqualification Act 1975; Industry Act 1975; Social Security Administration Act 1992; National Lottery etc. Act 1993; Government of Wales Act 1998; Constitutional Reform Act 2005; Government of Wales Act 2006
Amended by	Wales Act 2017
Relates to	Fiscal Responsibility Act 2010

Status: Amended

History of passage through Parliament

Records of Parliamentary debate relating to the statute from Hansard, at TheyWorkForYou

Text of statute as originally enacted

Revised text of statute as amended

The Budget Responsibility and National Audit Act 2011 (c. 4) is an act of the Parliament of the United Kingdom.

== Provisions ==
It provides a statutory footing for the already-established Office for Budget Responsibility, and requires the treasury to set out its approach to fiscal policy in a Charter for Budget Responsibility. It also sets out a new structure for the National Audit Office and repeals the Fiscal Responsibility Act 2010.

It was introduced in the House of Lords by the Commercial Secretary to the Treasury Lord Sassoon, on behalf of the Government, and it received royal assent on 22 March 2011.

== Office for Budget Responsibility ==
The Office for Budget Responsibility was initially constituted in shadow form by the Conservative party opposition in December 2009. It was then formally created by the new government after the general election in May 2010, before being put on a statutory footing by this act.

The OBR provides independent economic forecasts as background to the preparation of the UK budget.
