= June 2010 United Kingdom budget =

June 2010 United Kingdom Budget
- Presented: 22 June 2010 (Tuesday)
- Country: United Kingdom
- Parliament: 55th
- Party: Conservative/Liberal Democrat coalition
- Chancellor: George Osborne
- Total revenue: £548 billion (40% of 2009 GDP)
- Total expenditures: £697 billion (51% of 2009 GDP)
- Deficit: £149 billion (11% of 2009 GDP)

The June 2010 United Kingdom Budget, officially also known as Responsibility, freedom, fairness: a five-year plan to re-build the economy, was delivered by George Osborne, Chancellor of the Exchequer, to the House of Commons in his budget speech that commenced at 12.33pm on Tuesday, 22 June 2010 (just 90 days after the previous budget speech). It was the first budget of the Conservative-Liberal Democrat coalition formed following the general election of May 2010. The government dubbed it an "emergency budget", and stated that its purpose was to reduce the national debt accumulated under the Labour government.

In his budget speech Osborne quoted data and forecasts made by the independent Office for Budget Responsibility that was formed by the coalition soon after they took up office.

The preceding budget of the Labour Party in March was only partly enacted due to the calling of the election.

== Economy ==
Osborne predicted that the economy would grow by 1.2% in 2010, rising to 2.9% in 2013.

He said the country was set to miss the previous government's "golden rule" in the current cycle by £485bn.

The Chancellor said he expected consumer price inflation (as measured by the Consumer Price Index) to reach 2.7% in 2010, above the target of 2%.

He forecast that unemployment would peak at 8.1% in 2010, falling over each of the next four years.

Osborne said the state accounted for "almost half" of all national income, including the escalating cost of debt interest, which was "completely unsustainable".

== Measures introduced ==
Osborne aimed to balance the structural current account deficit by 2015–16. The balance of tax rises to spending cuts in his budget was 23% to 77%.

=== Taxes ===
Income tax personal allowances for people under 65 years old will be raised by £1000 from April 2011, taking about 880,000 people out of the tax system and reducing income tax on the low-paid by £200 p.a.

The main rate of VAT will increase from 17.5% to 20% on 4 January 2011. This had been widely predicted before the Budget. No taxes will be imposed on items that are currently zero-rated (e.g. food, children's clothes).

A new bank levy was announced, to raise £2 billion p.a. Corporation Tax will fall progressively in 1% increments for each of the next four years, from 28% to 24%. The small companies' tax rate will be cut from 21% to 20%.

Capital gains tax increases from 18% to 28% from the following day, for higher rate taxpayers only.

There were no changes to duties on fuel (petrol and diesel), alcohol, and tobacco. Osborne cancelled the increase that Labour had planned on cider.

Receipts	2010-11 revenues (£bn)
Income tax	150
Value added tax (VAT)	81
National insurance	99
Excise duties	46
Corporate tax	43
Council tax	25
Business rates	25
Other	79
Total government revenue	548

=== Spending ===
Osborne announced further reductions in public expenditure to reach £17 billion by 2014/15. The Budget did not make any further reductions in overall capital expenditure, but projects will be prioritised and reassessed in the autumn Spending Review.

Public sector workers face a two-year pay freeze, although 1.7 million of those earning less than £21,000 will get a flat pay-rise of £250 each year.

The government will accelerate the increase in state pension age to 66.

From 2011, state benefits other than the state pension and pension credit will be pegged to consumer prices rather than retail prices. The same will apply to public service pensions. These measures were expected to reduce public spending by over £6 billion p.a. within the five-year term of the Parliament.

Child benefit was frozen for three years. Tax credits will provide an additional £150 a year for the poorest families, but with withdrawal rates increased by 2% to 41%, reducing tax credits at higher incomes.

Housing Benefit reforms will introduce a maximum payment of £400 per week. This would save £1.8bn p.a.

A new medical assessment for Disability Living Allowance will be introduced from 2013.

Heavy Industrial Plant Grants will rise from 10% to 11% of the purchase price for small business.

The Queen's civil list payment remained frozen at £7.9 million.

Department	2010-11 expenditure (£bn)
Social protection	194
Health	122
Education	89
Debt interest	44
Defence	40
Public order and safety	35
Personal social services	32
Housing and environment	27
Transport	22
Industry, agriculture and employment	20
Other	73
Total government spending	697

== Prior announcements and discussions ==
In the light of the change in ruling party, the recession, the novelty of coalition government and the strain which the painful decisions would put on the coalition, this Budget generated a high degree of public interest and discussion in advance.

The government's top priority is to reduce government borrowing from its peacetime record highs. Prime Minister David Cameron said the previous Labour government had refused to publish its own projections showing the escalating cost of interest. He argued that taxes should be spent on public services rather than paying interest on the national debt.

The changes to the UK Budget were expected to focus on cuts to government spending rather than increases in taxation. The Chancellor stated early on that health and international aid expenditure would be protected. On 24 May, he then outlined £6.2 billion of spending cuts.

The coalition agreement included an intention to reduce child tax credits and Child trust funds for better-off families. The parties had agreed to raise the rate of capital gains tax (CGT) to match individuals' highest rates of income tax, excluding gains on business investments, and to reduce the rise in employers' National Insurance contributions which Labour had planned. The Conservatives had also agreed to Liberal Democrat wishes to gradually raise the personal allowance, i.e. the level of income on which no tax is paid.

Tory statements before the election also pointed to a reduction in Corporate tax, perhaps partly paid for by changes to capital allowances which are currently seen as complex.

The Business Secretary, Liberal Democrat Vince Cable, had announced that reducing tax avoidance is a priority of the new government.

The coalition agreement did not resolve all areas of differences between the two parties' tax policies, and tax advisers were complaining of uncertainty ahead of the budget. The Liberal Democrats had wanted to reduce the annual exemption from CGT, and to cap the rate of relief for pension contributions. John Redwood and David Davis publicly argued against the rise in the CGT rate, but Cable insisted that the parties were not divided over the issue.

== Reactions after the Budget speech ==
Acting Labour leader Harriet Harman responded for the opposition, calling the speech a "Tory budget", and predicting that it would increase unemployment and stifle growth.

Some Liberal Democrats were disappointed that capital gains tax (CGT) remained lower than the rates of income tax. Meanwhile, the British Venture Capital Association expressed entrepreneurs' "deep concern" over the CGT hike, warning that it could deter overseas investors. The immediate implementation date for the rise surprised tax advisers.

However, former Bank of England rate setter David Blanchflower warned that the budget risked sending the UK into another recession, and that a "double-dip" is now the best case scenario,

The Minister for Women and Equalities, Theresa May, had written to the Chancellor emphasising the need to assess the effect of the budget on women, disabled people and ethnic minorities. In September 2010 the Fawcett Society was sought a judicial review of the emergency budget for failing to demonstrate that such an assessment had been made. The High Court refused to grant permission for such a review in December 2010.

A report published in October 2010 by Research Councils UK voiced the opinion that cuts to research and development were likely to do immense damage to the UK economy. The report's author, Romesh Vaitilingam, stated that evidence suggests private sector spending and productivity is encouraged by public sector spending.

== See also ==
- United Kingdom government austerity programme
- United Kingdom coalition government (2010–2015)
- Finance (No. 2) Act 2010
