= HM Treasury v Ahmed =

2010 UK legal case

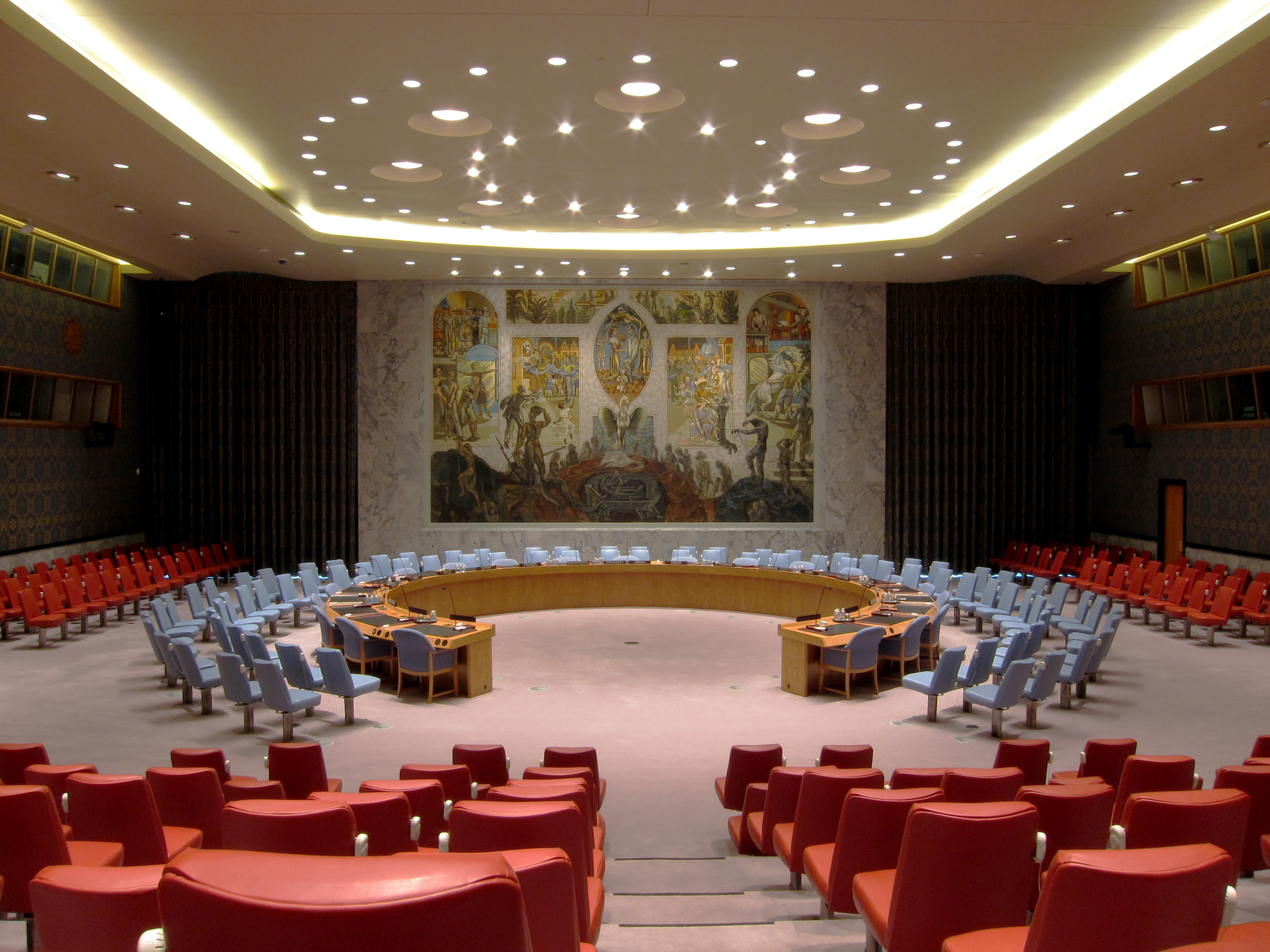
- United Nations Security Council
- Court: Supreme Court of the United Kingdom
- Citations: [2010] UKSC 2, [2010] 4 All ER 829, [2010] 2 AC 534

Keywords
- Terrorism, fundamental rights

HM Treasury v Ahmed [2010] UKSC 2 is a UK constitutional law and human rights case concerning the United Nations Act 1946 and the powers it grants to the executive to issue terrorism control orders.

== Facts ==
Under the United Nations Act 1946 section 1, the UK passed the Terrorism (United Nations Measures) Order 2006 and the Al-Qaida and Taliban (United Nations Measures) Order 2006, to fulfil its obligations under the UN Charter, article 25, to give effect to UN Security Council Resolution 1373 (2001). The aim was to prevent financing for terrorism. They allowed freezing of economic assets, apart from basic expenses, of anyone designated by the order. Article 4(1)(2) of the Terrorism Order allowed the Treasury to designate anybody it had reasonable grounds to suspect “is or may be” helping terrorism. Article 3(1)(b) of the Al-Quida Order stated people on the UN Security Council's "sanctions committee" list was a designate person. The Treasury had designated Mohammed Jabar Ahmed, as well as Mohammed al-Ghabra and Hani El Sayed Sabaei Youssef, as suspects, their bank accounts were frozen, although they were given licences to receive social security benefits. They applied for the order to be set aside.

Collins J held the orders were ultra vires of the United Nations Act 1946 section 1, and quashed them, and the directions. On appeal, the Court of Appeal allowed an appeal by the Treasury in part. If the words "or may be" were removed from the test of reasonable suspicion on which the Treasury's directions were based, then article 4 of the Terrorism Order was valid. The Al-Qaida Order was also lawful, although a designated person could still seek judicial review of his designation. Ahmed then claimed judicial review for being listed, or alternatively sought the Al-Qaida Order be quashed. The judge at first instance then declared the Al Qaida Order was ultra vires in respect of Ahmed but did not quash it. The Treasury appealed directly to the Supreme Court.

== Judgment ==
The Supreme Court held that fundamental rights could only be overridden by express language or with necessary implication, and so the general wording of section 1 of the United Nations Act 1946 did not empower the government to pass the Order. Resolution 1373 (2001) was not phrased in terms of reasonable suspicion, so by introducing such a test the Terrorism (United Nations Measures) Order 2006 went beyond what was necessary to comply with the Resolution. This meant the Terrorism Order was ultra vires.

On the Al-Qaida Order the Supreme Court held (Lord Brown dissenting) that it gave effect to the sanctions committee procedure, which itself had no provision for basic procedural fairness. This deprived designated people of the fundamental right to access an effective judicial remedy. Accordingly, article 3(1)(b) of the Al-Qaida Order was ultra vires.

On the Treasury's application for suspension of the court's order, it was held that the court should not lend itself to a procedure which was designed to obfuscate the effect of its judgment and so no part of the court's order would be suspended.

Lord Hope (with Lord Walker and Lady Hale agreeing) said the following.

61. I would hold that, by introducing the reasonable suspicion test as a means of giving effect to SCR 1373(2001), the Treasury exceeded their powers under section 1(1) of the 1946 Act. This is a clear example of an attempt to adversely affect the basic rights of the citizen without the clear authority of Parliament – a process which Lord Browne-Wilkinson condemned in R v Secretary of State for the Home Department, Ex p Pierson [1998] AC 539. As Lord Hoffmann said in R v Secretary of State for the Home Department, Ex p Simms [2000] 2 AC 115, 131, fundamental rights cannot be overridden by general or ambiguous words. The absence of any indication that Parliament had the imposition of restrictions on the freedom of individuals in mind when the provisions of the 1946 Act were being debated makes it impossible to say that it squarely confronted those effects and was willing to accept the political cost when that measure was enacted. In my opinion the TO is ultra vires section 1(1) of the 1946 Act and, subject to what I say about the date when these orders should take effect, it together with the directions that have been made under it in the cases of A, K, M and G must be quashed.

...

73. The Security Council resolutions that were in issue in [the Al-Jedda] case were made pursuant to article 42 of the Charter not, as in this case, under article 41. But Mr Singh did not suggest, in my view rightly, that it could be distinguished on that ground. What he did suggest was that the Grand Chamber of the European Court of Human Rights, before which the Al-Jedda case is to be heard, might reach a different view on this matter, especially in the light of the decision of the ECJ in Kadi v Council of the European Union. He pointed out that, as the prohibition on the death penalty, unlike that against torture, was not ius cogens, the logical conclusion of the Al-Jedda approach was that a direction by the Security Council that those found guilty of terrorist acts must be sentenced to death would have to prevail over article 2 of the Convention and article 1 of Protocol 13 (the Death Penalty Protocol). It was arguable that this was to drive the effect of article 103 too far: see Soering v United Kingdom (1989) 11 EHRR 439. The same could be said of the breaches of Convention rights that resulted from the SCRs directing the kind of freezing regime that the AQO was designed to give effect to, especially in view of their indefinite effect and the lack of effective access to an independent tribunal for the determination of challenges to decisions about listing and de-listing.

74. I do not think that it is open to this court to predict how the reasoning of the House of Lords in Al-Jedda would be viewed in Strasbourg. For the time being we must proceed on the basis that article 103 leaves no room for any exception, and that the Convention rights fall into the category of obligations under an international agreement over which obligations under the Charter must prevail. The fact that the rights that G seeks to invoke in this case are now part of domestic law does not affect that conclusion. As Lord Bingham memorably pointed out in R (Ullah) v Special Adjudicator [2004] 2 AC 323, para 20, the Convention is an international instrument, the correct interpretation of which can be authoritatively expounded only by the Strasbourg court. It must be for the Strasbourg court to provide the authoritative guidance that is needed so that all the contracting states can adopt a uniform position about the extent to which, if at all, the Convention rights or any of them can be held to prevail over their obligations under the UN Charter.

75. But this leaves open for consideration how the position may be regarded under domestic law. Mr Singh submitted that the obligation under article 25 of the Charter to give effect to the SCRs directing the measures to be taken against Usama bin Laden, Al-Qaida and the Taliban had to respect the basic premises of our own legal order. Two fundamental rights were in issue in G's case, and as they were to be found in domestic law his right to invoke them was not affected by article 103 of the UN Charter. One was the right to peaceful enjoyment of his property, which could only be interfered with by clear legislative words: Entick v Carrington (1765) 19 Howell's State Trials 1029, 1066, per Lord Camden CJ. The other was his right of unimpeded access to a court: R (Anufrijeva) v Secretary of State for the Home Department [2004] 1 AC 604, para 26, per Lord Steyn. As it was put by Viscount Simonds in Pyx Granite Co Ltd v Ministry of Housing and Local Government [1960] AC 260, 286, the subject's right of access to Her Majesty's courts for the determination of his rights is not to be excluded except by clear words. As Mr Singh pointed out, both of these rights are embraced by the principle of legality, which lies at the heart of the relationship between Parliament and the citizen. Fundamental rights may not be overridden by general words. This can only be done by express language or by necessary implication. So it was not open to the Treasury to use its powers under the general wording of section 1(1) of the 1946 Act to subject individuals to a regime which had these effects.

76. I would accept Mr Singh's proposition that, as fundamental rights may not be overridden by general words, section 1 of the 1946 Act does not give authority for overriding the fundamental rights of the individual. It does not do so either expressly or by necessary implication. The question is whether the effect of G's designation under the AQO has that effect. To some extent this must be a question of degree. Some interference with the right to peaceful enjoyment of one's property may have been foreseen by the framers of section 1, as it authorises the making of provision for the apprehension, trial and punishment of persons offending against the Order. To that extent coercive steps to enable the measures to be applied effectively can be regarded as within its scope. But there must come a point when the intrusion upon the right to enjoyment of one's property is so great, so overwhelming and so timeless that the absence of any effective means of challenging it means that this can only be brought about under the express authority of Parliament.

== Significance ==
This case overturned the method by which, through Statutory Orders, the UK complied with UNSC Resolution 1373. It forced the government of Gordon Brown to conceive and pass within a week the Terrorist Asset-Freezing (Temporary Provisions) Act 2010.

== See also ==
- UK constitutional law
- UK civil liberties
- Hani al-Sibai
