= Naval Medical Compassionate Fund Act 1915 =

Act of the Parliament of the United Kingdom

Naval Medical Compassionate Fund Act 1915 (Note: Section 2.)
- Act of Parliament
- Parliament of the United Kingdom
- Long title: An Act to make further, and better provision with regard to the Naval Medical Compassionate Fund.
- Citation: 5 & 6 Geo. 5. c. 28
- Territorial extent: United Kingdom

Dates
- Royal assent: 16 March 1915
- Commencement: 16 March 1915 (Note: The Acts of Parliament (Commencement) Act 1793.)
- Repealed: 2 April 2012 (Note: The Armed Forces Act 2011 (Commencement No. 1, Transitional and Transitory Provisions) Order 2012 (SI 2012/669).)
Other legislation
Repeals/revokes	See § Repealed enactments
Amended by	Statute Law Revision Act 1927; Defence (Transfer of Functions) (No. 1) Order 1964; Civil Partnership Act 2004
Repealed by	Armed Forces Act 2011

Status: Repealed

Text of statute as originally enacted

Revised text of statute as amended

The Naval Medical Compassionate Fund Act 1915 (5 & 6 Geo. 5. c. 28) was an act of the Parliament of the United Kingdom that reorganised the management of the Naval Medical Compassionate Fund, a charitable fund providing benefits to the widows and orphans of naval medical officers, and repealed the earlier acts governing it.

== Provisions ==
=== Repealed enactments ===
Section 1(3) of the act repealed 4 enactments, listed in the schedule to the act.

Citation	Short title	Description	Extent of repeal
11 & 12 Vict. c. 58	Naval Medical Supplement Fund Society Act 1848	An Act to authorise for Ten Years, and to the end of the then next Session of Parliament, the Regulation of the Annuities, and Premiums of the Naval Medical Supplemental Fund Society.	The whole act.
22 Vict. c. 28	Naval Medical Supplemental Fund Society Act 1859	An Act to continue the Act for the Regulation of the Annuities and Premiums of the Naval Medical Supplemental Fund Society.	The whole act.
24 & 25 Vict. c. 108	Naval Medical Supplemental Fund Society Winding-up Act 1861	The Naval Medical Supplemental Fund Society Winding-Up Act, 1861.	The whole act.
26 & 27 Vict. c. 111	Naval Medical, etc., Society Act 1863	An Act to amend the Naval Medical Supplemental Fund Society Winding-Up Act, 1861.	The whole act.

== Subsequent developments ==
An Order in Council made under section 1, the Naval Medical Compassionate Fund Order 2008 (SI 2008/3129), appointed the Royal Navy and Royal Marines Charity as sole trustee of the fund and established a management committee for it.

The whole act was repealed by section 27 of, and by section 30(2) of and schedule 5 to, the Armed Forces Act 2011, which came into force on 2 April 2012, so that the fund could be transferred to, and administered under, the Charities Act 1993.
