= March 2010 United Kingdom budget =

March 2010 United Kingdom Budget
- Presented: 24 March 2010 (Wednesday)
- Country: United Kingdom
- Parliament: 54th
- Party: Labour
- Chancellor: Alistair Darling
- Total revenue: £541 billion
- Total expenditures: £704 billion
- Deficit: £163 billion

The March 2010 United Kingdom Budget, official known as Budget 2010: Securing the recovery, was delivered by Alistair Darling, Chancellor of the Exchequer, to the House of Commons on 24 March 2010.

The budget speech outlined the Labour Government's fiscal policies prior to the 2010 general election, which had to be called before July. It was also the last budget delivered by Labour until October 2024.

The Budget's main headlines included:

- A one-off "bank payroll tax" on bankers bonus payments, projected to be worth £2bn
- £11bn of savings across Government and a further £5bn savings from targeted spending
- Introduce a new right to open a basic bank account
- Above-inflation increases to alcohol and tobacco duties, with a pledge to redefine strong ciders in September 2010
- To reduce a previously announced fuel duty increase in April 2010, and introduce small increases at intervals
- Temporary increase in small business rate relief
- Threshold for stamp duty raised from £125,000 to £250,000 for first-time buyers for two years, and increased stamp duty on homes over £1,000,000 to 5%
- Pledge of an increase in future ISA savings limits to keep pace with inflation, and confirmed previously announced increase in ISA savings limits
- Introduction of a tax break for the British video games sector

The Chancellor aimed for public sector net borrowing to fall to 8.5% of GDP by 2011-12, and 4.0% by 2014-15. Public sector net debt was projected to increase to 73% of GDP by 2012-13.

The Treasury published the Finance Act 2010 on 1 April, running to 240 pages. After the General Election was called on 6 April, the Chartered Institute of Taxation expressed concern at the lack of time for debate on complex measures. In the event, many of the clauses announced in the Budget speech were dropped from the Bill before Parliament was dissolved.

== Taxes ==
Receipts	2010-10 revenues (£bn)
Income tax	146
Value added tax (VAT)	78
National insurance	97
Excise duties	46
Corporate tax	42
Council tax	26
Business rates	25
Other	81
Total Government revenue	541

== Spending ==
Department	2010-10 expenditure (£bn)
Social protection	196
Health	122
Education	89
Debt interest	43
Defence	40
Public order and safety	36
Personal social services	33
Housing and environment	27
Transport	22
Industry, agriculture and employment	20
Other	74
Total Government spending	704
