= Public Bodies Act 2011 =

Act of the United Kingdom Parliament

Public Bodies Act 2011 (Note: Section 39.)
- Act of Parliament
- Parliament of the United Kingdom
- Long title: An Act to confer powers on Ministers of the Crown in relation to certain public bodies and offices; to confer powers on Welsh Ministers in relation to environmental and other public bodies; to make provision about delegation and shared services in relation to persons exercising environmental functions; to abolish regional development agencies; to make provision about the funding of Sianel Pedwar Cymru; to make provision about the powers of bodies established under the National Heritage Act 1983 to form companies; to repeal provisions of the Coroners and Justice Act 2009 relating to appeals to the Chief Coroner; to make provision about amendment of Schedule 1 to the Superannuation Act 1972; and for connected purposes.
- Citation: 2011 c. 24
- Introduced by: Francis Maude (Commons); Lord Taylor of Holbeach (Lords)
- Territorial extent: United Kingdom (Note: Section 37.)

Dates
- Royal assent: 14 December 2011
- Commencement: Various (Note: Section 38.)
Other legislation
Amends	House of Commons Disqualification Act 1975]; National Heritage Act 1983; Tribunals, Courts and Enforcement Act 2007
Repeals/revokes	Regional Development Agencies Act 1998
Amended by	Co-operative and Community Benefit Societies Act 2014; Infrastructure Act 2015; Sentencing Act 2020
Relates to	Coroners and Justice Act 2009; Superannuation Act 1972

Status: Amended

Text of statute as originally enacted

Revised text of statute as amended

The Public Bodies Act 2011 (c. 24) is an act of the Parliament of the United Kingdom concerning public bodies.

== Background ==
The act was passed to enable what the Cameron-Clegg coalition government described as the bonfire of the quangos.

When the act was passed there were approximately 900 quangos.

== Provisions ==
The act enables ministers the ability to establish, merge or abolish public bodies through secondary legislation. This must be approved by Parliament.

The government is required to consider the views of select committees.

The act requires the government to secure sufficient funding for S4C.

== Impact ==
From 2010 levels, the number of arm's-length bodies had reduced by 200 in January 2013, by 285 in March 2015 and by 378 in March 2018.

== Further developments ==
When reviewing the government's use of the act in 2014, the Public Administration Select Committee recommended a simpler classification system for public bodies.
