= Supply and Appropriation Act =

Supply and Appropriation Act may refer to:

- Supply and Appropriation (Anticipation and Adjustments) Act 2012
- Supply and Appropriation (Main Estimates) Act 2012
- Supply and Appropriation (Anticipation and Adjustments) Act 2013
