= Marine Insurance Act 1906 =

Act of the Parliament of the United Kingdom

Marine Insurance Act 1906 (Note: Section 94.)
- Act of Parliament
- Parliament of the United Kingdom
- Long title: An Act to codify the Law relating to Marine Insurance.
- Citation: 6 Edw. 7. c. 41
- Territorial extent: United Kingdom

Dates
- Royal assent: 21 December 1906
- Commencement: 1 January 1907 (Note: Section 93.)
Other legislation
Amends	See § Repealed enactments
Repeals/revokes	See § Repealed enactments
Amended by	Statute Law Revision Act 1927; Marine and Aviation Insurance (War Risks) Act 1952; Finance Act 1959; Hovercraft (Application of Enactments) Order 1972; Consumer Insurance (Disclosure and Representations) Act 2012; Insurance Act 2015

Status: Amended

Text of statute as originally enacted

Revised text of statute as amended

Text of the Marine Insurance Act 1906 as in force today (including any amendments) within the United Kingdom, from legislation.gov.uk.

The Marine Insurance Act 1906 (6 Edw. 7. c. 41) is an act of the Parliament of the United Kingdom regulating marine insurance. The act applies both to "ship & cargo" marine insurance, and to P&I cover.

The act was drafted by Sir Mackenzie Dalzell Chalmers, who had earlier drafted the Sale of Goods Act 1893 (56 & 57 Vict. c. 71). The act is a codifying act, that is to say, it attempts to collate existing common law and present it in a statutory (i.e. "codified") form. In the event, the act did more than merely codify the law, and some new elements were introduced in 1906. The 1906 act has been highly influential, as it governs not merely English law, but it also dominates marine insurance worldwide through its wholesale adoption by other jurisdictions.

Two modern statutes, the Consumer Insurance (Disclosure and Representations) Act 2012 ("CIDRA") and the Insurance Act 2015 have made amendments to the law of insurance.

== Provisions ==
The most important sections of the act include:

s.4: a policy without insurable interest is void.

s.17: imposes a duty on the insured of uberrimae fides (as opposed to caveat emptor); i.e. that questions must be answered honestly and the risk not misrepresented.

s.18: the proposer of the insurer has a duty to disclose all material facts relevant to the acceptance and rating of the risk. Failure to do so is known as non-disclosure or concealment (there are minor differences in the two terms) and renders the insurance voidable by the insurer.

s.33(3): If [a warranty] be not [exactly] complied with, then, subject to any express provision in the policy, the insurer is discharged from liability as from the date of the breach of warranty, but without prejudice to any liability incurred by him before that date.

s.34(2): where a warranty has been broken, it is no defence to the insured that the breach has been remedied, and the warranty complied with, prior to the loss.

s.34(3): a breach of warranty may be waived by the insurer.

s.50: a policy may be assigned. Typically, a shipowner might assign the benefit of a policy to the ship-mortgagor.

ss.60-63: deals with the issues of a constructive total loss. The insured can, by notice, claim for a constructive total loss with the insurer becoming entitled to the ship or cargo if it should later turn up. (By contrast an actual total loss describes the physical destruction of a vessel or cargo.)

s.79: deals with subrogation; ie. the rights of the insurer to stand in the shoes of an indemnified insured and recover salvage for his own benefit.

Schedule 1 of the act contains a list of definitions; schedule 2 contains the model policy wording.

=== Repealed enactments ===
Section 92 of the act repealed 3 enactments, listed in the second schedule to the act.

Citation	Short title	Description	Extent of repeal
19 Geo. 2. c. 37	Marine Insurance Act 1745	An Act to regulate insurance on ships belonging to the subjects of Great Britain, and on merchandizes or effects laden thereon.	The whole act.
28 Geo. 3. c. 56	Marine Insurance Act 1788	An Act to repeal an Act made in the twenty-fifth year of the reign of his present Majesty, intituled "An Act for regulating Insurances on Ships, and on goods, merchandizes, or effects," and for substituting other provisions for the like purpose in lieu thereof.	The whole act so far as it relates to marine insurance.
31 & 32 Vict. c. 86	Policies of Marine Assurance Act 1868	The Policies of Marine Assurance Act, 1868.	The whole act.

== Subsequent developments ==
The Consumer Insurance (Disclosure and Representations) Act 2012 ("CIDRA") added section 18(6), section 19(2) (renumbering the existing section 19 as section 19(1)) and section 20(8) to the act.

The words from ", and" to the end of section 17 were omitted by section 14(3)(a) of the Insurance Act 2015; sections 18, 19 and 20 were omitted by section 21(2) of that act; and the second sentence of section 33(3) and the whole of section 34 were omitted by section 10(7) of that act. Under section 22 of the 2015 act, these changes apply only to contracts of insurance entered into after the end of the relevant period of 18 months beginning with the day the 2015 act was passed.

Part 5 of the Insurance Act 2015 addresses "Good faith" as follows:

- Section 14 provides that "any rule of law permitting a party to a contract of insurance to avoid the contract on the ground that utmost good faith has not been observed by the other party is abolished.
- Accordingly, s,14(3) amends s.17 of the Marine Insurance Act 1906 to read: "A contract of marine insurance is a contract based upon the utmost good faith" and that section's subsequent words: "and, if the utmost good faith be not observed by either party, the contract may be avoided by the other party" are now omitted.

== See also ==
- Airmic
- UK commercial law
- Marine insurance
- Seaworthiness (law)
