= Third Parties (Rights against Insurers) Act 2010 =

Act of the Parliament of the United Kingdom

Third Parties (Rights against Insurers) Act 2010 (Note: Section 21(1).)
- Act of Parliament
- Parliament of the United Kingdom
- Long title: An Act to make provision about the rights of third parties against insurers of liabilities to third parties in the case where the insured is insolvent, and in certain other cases.
- Citation: 2010 c. 10
- Territorial extent: England and Wales; Scotland; Northern Ireland; (Note: Section 21(3)–(6).)

Dates
- Royal assent: 25 March 2010
- Commencement: 1 August 2016 (Note: Section 21(2). The Third Parties (Rights against Insurers) Act 2010 (Commencement) Order 2016 (SI 2016/550).)
Other legislation
Amends	Civil Jurisdiction and Judgments Act 1982
Repeals/revokes	Third Parties (Rights Against Insurers) Act (Northern Ireland) 1930; Third Parties (Rights against Insurers) Act 1930
Amended by	Insurance Act 2015; Deregulation Act 2015; Third Parties (Rights against Insurers) Regulations 2016; Bankruptcy (Scotland) Act 2016 (Consequential Provisions and Modifications) Order 2016; Corporate Insolvency and Governance Act 2020; Payment and Electronic Money Institution Insolvency Regulations 2021; Judicial Factors (Scotland) Act 2025
Relates to	Insurance Act 2015

Status: Amended

Text of statute as originally enacted

Revised text of statute as amended

Third Parties (Rights against Insurers) Act 1930 (Note: Section 5.)
- Act of Parliament
- Parliament of the United Kingdom
- Long title: An Act to confer on third parties rights against insurers of third-party risks in the event of the insured becoming insolvent, and in certain other events.
- Citation: 20 & 21 Geo. 5. c. 25
- Territorial extent: United Kingdom

Dates
- Royal assent: 10 July 1930
- Commencement: 10 July 1930 (Note: The Acts of Parliament (Commencement) Act 1793.)
- Repealed: 1 August 2016 (Note: The Third Parties (Rights against Insurers) Act 2010 (Commencement) Order 2016 (SI 2016/550).)
Other legislation
Amended by	Insolvency Act 1985; Bankruptcy (Scotland) Act 1985; Insolvency Act 1986; Limited Liability Partnerships Regulations 2001; Enterprise Act 2002 (Insolvency) Order 2003
Repealed by	Third Parties (Rights against Insurers) Act 2010

Status: Repealed

Text of statute as originally enacted

The Third Parties (Rights against Insurers) Act 2010 (c. 10) is an act of the Parliament of the United Kingdom which received royal assent on 25 March 2010.

The act changed regulation of liability insurance policies.

It came into force on 1 August 2016, removing a provision in the Third Parties (Rights against Insurers) Act 1930 which required a third party claimant affected by the insolvency of an insured party to obtain a judgment on the insurer's liability before being able to issue proceedings. Since 2016, the third party claimant has been able to issue proceedings directly against the insurer. Schedule 1 to the Act also established a regime under which information about the insolvent party's insurance could be made available to a person with a "reasonable belief" that they had a transferred right to claim.

The act came into force over six years after its royal assent. The delay holding back its "long-awaited" implementation was related to certain shortcomings concerning business insolvency, administration and dissolution, which were addressed in the Insurance Act 2015.

The Third Parties (Rights against Insurers) Act 1930 (20 & 21 Geo. 5. c. 25), and its Northern Ireland equivalent, the Third Parties (Rights Against Insurers) Act (Northern Ireland) 1930 (20 & 21 Geo. 5. c. 19 (N.I.)), were repealed by the 2010 act. In 2001, the Law Commission of England and Wales and the Scottish Law Commission reviewed the 1930 legislation and found that it was not working as well as it should. The two commissions' final report set out proposals for reform which were largely reproduced in the new act. The 2010 significantly streamlined the procedures set out under the 1930 acts.

The 1930 acts continue to apply in certain circumstances.
