= Consumer Insurance (Disclosure and Representations) Act 2012 =

Act of the Parliament of the United Kingdom

Consumer Insurance (Disclosure and Representations) Act 2012 (Note: Section 12(1).)
- Act of Parliament
- Parliament of the United Kingdom
- Long title: An Act to make provision about disclosure and representations in connection with consumer insurance contracts.
- Citation: 2012 c. 6
- Introduced by: Mark Hoban (Commons); Lord Sassoon (Lords)
- Territorial extent: England and Wales; Scotland; Northern Ireland; (Note: Section 12(6)–(7).)

Dates
- Royal assent: 8 March 2012
- Commencement: 8 March 2012 (sections 1 and 12); 6 April 2013 (rest of act); (Note: Section 12(2)–(3). The Consumer Insurance (Disclosure and Representations) Act 2012 (Commencement) Order 2013 (SI 2013/450).)
Other legislation
Amends	Marine Insurance Act 1906; Road Traffic Act 1988; Road Traffic (Northern Ireland) Order 1981
Amended by	Insurance Act 2015

Status: Amended

History of passage through Parliament

Text of statute as originally enacted

Revised text of statute as amended

The Consumer Insurance (Disclosure and Representations) Act 2012 (c. 6) is an act of the Parliament of the United Kingdom which made important reforms to insurance law.

== Overview ==
The act was a consequence of the Law Commission's millennium review of the law of insurance that started in 2006. The review examined insurance in general, and of marine insurance in particular. The new legislation is a response to a consensus that the Marine Insurance Act 1906 is old-fashioned, it no longer represents current practice, and it undermines the continuing dominant position of English insurers in the global market.

The act has since been complemented by the Insurance Act 2015; and both of these modern acts have significantly amended the Marine Insurance Act 1906 (8 Edw. 7. c. 41), particularly in the area of misrepresentation and disclosure.

== Provisions ==
The act makes provisions as follows:

- Section 1 creates the concept of "consumer" and "non-consumer" insurance contracts.
- Section 2 covers Pre-contractual disclosures and representations to the insurer. The Act imposes a duty upon the insured to take reasonable care not to make a misrepresentation to the insurer.
- Section 3 declares that the Standard of Care is to be determined in the light of all the relevant circumstances.
- Sections 4 defines "qualifying misrepresentations: definitions and remedies".
- Sections 5 defines "qualifying misrepresentations: classification and presumptions".
- Section 6 covers warranties and representations
- Section 8 covers life insurance policies
- Schedule 1 makes provision for Insurers' remedies for qualifying misrepresentations.
- Schedule 2 makes provision for rules determining the status of agents

The act replaces the disclosure requirements of the Marine Insurance Act 1906. The act moves the burden from the consumer having to "disclose information an underwriter may consider material" to insurance providers who are required to make sure their application forms ask all relevant questions.

== Commencement ==
The act was brought into force in April 2013.

== See also ==
- Marine Insurance
- UK commercial law
