= Insurance Act 2015 =

Act of the Parliament of the United Kingdom

Insurance Act 2015 (Note: Section 23(5).)
- Act of Parliament
- Parliament of the United Kingdom
- Long title: An Act to make new provision about insurance contracts; to Amend the Third Parties (Rights against Insurers) Act 2010 in relation to the insured persons to whom that Act applies; and for connected purposes.
- Citation: 2015 c. 4
- Introduced by: Andrea Leadsom MP (Commons); Lord Newby (Lords)
- Territorial extent: England and Wales; Scotland; Northern Ireland; (Note: Section 23(1).)

Dates
- Royal assent: 12 February 2015
- Commencement: Various (Note: Section 23(2)–(4).)
Other legislation
| Amends | Marine Insurance Act 1906; Road Traffic (Northern Ireland) Order 1981; Road Traffic Act 1988; Third Parties (Rights against Insurers) Act 2010; Consumer Insurance (Disclosure and Representations) Act 2012 |
| Amended by | Enterprise Act 2016 |
| Relates to | Consumer Insurance (Disclosure and Representations) Act 2012 |

Status: Amended

Text of statute as originally enacted

Revised text of statute as amended

The Insurance Act 2015 (c. 4) is an act of the Parliament of the United Kingdom which makes significant reforms to insurance law. It came into effect on 12 August 2016, and follows on from the Consumer Insurance (Disclosure and Representations) Act 2012 ("CIDRA"). Both of these new acts are a consequence of the Law Commission's millennium review of the law of insurance in general, and of marine insurance in particular. The Marine Insurance Act 1906 (6 Edw. 7. c. 41) has been amended by these two new acts.

== Provisions ==
The act prohibits insurers from rejecting customerrs' claims because they have given the wrong information about an irrelevant element of their policy.

Part 1

- The Insurance Act 2015 distinguishes between "consumer" and "non-consumer" insurance contracts. Parts 2 and 3 apply only to non-consumer insurance contracts.

Part 2 addresses the duty of fair presentation, which is a duty in operation before a contract in entered into.

- Section 3 imposes upon the insured "a duty to make a fair presentation of the risk" to the insurer. The insured must disclose "(a) every material circumstance which the insured knows or ought to know, or (b) failing that, a disclosure which gives the insurer sufficient information to put a prudent insurer on notice that it needs to make further enquiries ..."
- Section 4 defines what the insured knows or ought to know (i.e. who possesses relevant knowledge within the insured organisation); and Section 5 defines the insurer's knowledge. For the purposes of section 4, information is "known" by an organisation if it is known by its senior management ("those individuals who play significant roles in the making of decisions about how the insured’s activities are to be managed or organised") or by those individuals responsible for arranging its insurance, including risk managers, staff who assist in the collection of data, or others including brokers who negotiate the terms of the insurance.

Part 3 addresses "Warranties and other terms".

- Section 9 provides that a representation made by the insured is not capable of being converted into a warranty.
- Section 10 abolishes "any rule of law that a breach of warranty (express or implied) ... results in the discharge of the insurer's liability".
- Section 11 provides that if the insured fails to comply with a term tending to reduce the risk, then the insurer may not rely on such breach if the non-compliance could not have increased the risk.

Part 4 addresses "Fraudulent claims", putting the common law rule of forfeiture "on a statutory footing".

Part 5 addresses "Good faith".

- Section 14 provides that "any rule of law permitting a party to a contract of insurance to avoid the contract on the ground that the utmost good faith has not been observed by the other party is abolished". Accordingly, this section amends s.17 of the Marine Insurance Act 1906 to read: "A contract of marine insurance is a contract based upon the utmost good faith"; and that section's subsequent words: "and, if the utmost good faith be not observed by either party, the contract may be avoided by the other party" are now omitted.

There are two further parts containing ancillary provisions: Part 6 and Part 7.

== Application ==
The act applies to all new insurance contracts entered into or renewed from 12 August 2016, and also to amendments to insurance made from that date.

== Late payment of insurance claims ==
Initially, the act was to have contained provisions relating to damages for the late payment of insurance claims. However, these provisions were deemed to be too controversial to pass through the expedited parliamentary procedure for Law Commission bills. They were later reinserted in Part 5 of the Enterprise Bill, which was introduced into Parliament on 16 September 2015 and passed into law on 4 May 2016. Clause 13A of the 2015 Act now states that:

"It is an implied term of every contract of insurance that if the insured makes a claim under the contract, the insurer must pay any sums due in respect of the claim within a reasonable time. A reasonable time includes a reasonable time to investigate and assess the claim".

== See also ==
- UK commercial law
- Marine Insurance
- P&I Clubs
