= Insurable interest =

Legal requirement that a policyholder would suffer a loss from the insured event

In insurance practice, an insurable interest exists when an insured person derives a financial or other kind of benefit from the continuous existence, without repairment or damage, of the insured object (or in the case of a person, their continued survival). An "interested person" has an insurable interest in something when loss of or damage to that thing would cause the person to suffer a financial or other kind of loss. Normally, insurable interest is established by ownership, possession, or direct relationship. For example, people have insurable interests in their own homes and vehicles, but not in their neighbors' homes and vehicles, and almost certainly not those of strangers.

The "factual expectancy test" and "legal interest test" are the two major concepts of insurable interest.

== History ==
The United Kingdom was a leader in establishing an insurable interest as a prerequisite to purchasing insurance by passing legislation that prohibited insurance contracts if no insurable interest could be proven. Notably the Marine Insurance Act 1745 (which introduced the concept of an insurable interest, although it did not use the term expressly), the Life Assurance Act 1774 which renders such life insurance contracts illegal, and the Marine Insurance Act 1906, s.4 which renders such contracts void.

In 1806 Lord Eldon LC sitting in English House of Lords in Lucena v Craufurd (1806) 2 Bos & PNR 269 sought to define an insurable interest, and although that definition is often used, modern commentators regard it as unsatisfactory. Lord Eldon defined it as "a right in property, or a right derivable out of some contract about the property, which in either case may be lost upon some contingency affecting the possession or enjoyment of the party".

== Life insurance ==
Insurable interest refers to the right of property to be insured. It may also mean the interest of a beneficiary of a life insurance policy to prove need for the proceeds, called the "insurable interest doctrine". Insurable interest is no longer strictly an element of life insurance contracts under modern law. Exceptions include viatication agreements and charitable donations.

The principle of insurable interest on life insurance is that a person or organization can obtain an insurance policy on the life of another person if the person or organization obtaining the insurance values the life of the insured more than the amount of the policy. In this way, insurance can compensate for loss. A company may have an insurable interest in a President/CEO or other employee with special knowledge and skills. A creditor has an insurable interest in the life of a debtor, up to the amount of the loan. A person who is financially dependent on a second person has an insurable interest in the life of that second person.

Legal guidelines have been established in many jurisdictions which establish the kinds of family relationships for which an insurable interest exists. The insurable interest of family members is assumed to be emotional as well as financial. The law allows insurable interest on the presumption that a personal connection makes the family member more valuable alive than dead. Thus, close relatives are assumed to have an insurable interest in the lives of those relatives, but more distant relatives, such as cousins and in-laws cannot buy insurance of the lives of others related by these connections. A married person has an insurable interest in the life of their spouse, and minor children have an insurable interest in their parents. A person is also presumed to have an insurable interest in his or her own life. Broadly speaking, without an immediate family or a relationship that is recognized by law there is no insurable interest.

=== United Kingdom ===
A person is presumed to have an insurable interest in his or her own life, preferring to be alive and in good health rather than being sick, injured or dead. The unlimited interest extends to the life of spouses (and, since 2004, civil partners), even if there is no financial dependency.

Law in the United Kingdom does not recognize other classes of so-called 'natural affection' however, thus:

- Parents have no interest in the lives of their children
- Siblings have no interest in the lives of their fellow siblings
- Children have no interest in the lives of their parents (Scotland only)

No insurable interest is recognized for cohabiting couples. Although many insurers will accept such policies, they could potentially be invalidated because they have not been tested in court. In recent years, there have been moves to pass clear statutory provisions in this regard, which have not yet borne fruit.

In 2008, the Scottish Law Commission and the Law Commission of England and Wales tentatively proposed some reforms to the existing law, hoping to clarify the complex rules. Their preliminary recommendations included increasing the category of 'natural affection' to include dependent children and parents and also cohabitees. Officially this is still under review.

== See also ==
- Insurability
- Liability insurance
- Life insurance
- Property insurance
- Tontine
