= Forfeiture (law) =

Legal concept

Forfeiture is deprivation or destruction of a right in consequence of the non-performance of some obligation or condition. It can be accidental, and therefore is distinguished from waiver. In the law of England and Wales, the forfeiture rule is the rule of law which prevents a killer from inheriting the estate of a person they have unlawfully killed. The term also refers to the rule in English law under which an insured person who makes a fraudulent insurance claim loses their claim: this rule was derived from common law until the passage of the Insurance Act 2015, which "puts the common law rule of forfeiture on a statutory footing". An honour such as a knighthood can be forfeited if the recipient is later found unworthy.

== United States usage ==
Historically, forfeiture of a convict's land and other assets followed on from conviction for certain serious offences (and thus resulted from criminal activity rather than from a failure to act). A striking illustration of the practical effects of this rule is Giles Corey’s refusal to plead, in the Salem Witch Trials, instead dying under peine forte et dure. By refusing to plead he avoided the jurisdiction of the court and thus avoided conviction and the consequent forfeiture of his estate, which could then be inherited by his sons.

Forfeiture is broadly defined as the seizure of property, usually by the state, for failing to obey the law. A person may have a vested interest in property to be forfeit in two ways: In personum jurisdiction and in rem jurisdiction. In personum actions are against the owner of property, whereas in rem actions are taken directly against the object. In rem forfeiture actions may lead to unusual or even comedic case names, such as United States v. One Solid Gold Object in Form of a Rooster. The Racketeer Influenced and Corrupt Organizations Act provides for modern forfeiture actions in the United States with regard to criminal prosecution. This allows for forfeiture absent an in rem action. Any enterprise used to commit a crime under the RICO act may be seized. For example, a hotel owner who runs a prostitution business from his hotel and has bribed local officials to stay quiet could be subject to forfeiture under the act.

== See also ==
- Asset forfeiture
