= List of acts of the Parliament of the United Kingdom from 2012 =

This is a list of acts of the Parliament of the United Kingdom passed in 2012.

Acts passed since 1963 are cited by calendar year, as opposed to the convention used for earlier acts of citing the regnal year(s) in which the relevant parliamentary session was held. Each act passed in a respective year is given a chapter number (abbreviated "c."), denoted by Arabic numerals in the case of public general acts, lowercase Roman numerals in the case of local acts, or italicised Arabic numerals in the case of personal acts. These run as separate series.

25 acts of Parliament were passed in 2012: 23 public general acts and 2 local acts.

indicates that an act has been transcribed on Wikisource, indicates that an act is available to view at legislation.gov.uk, and indicates the location of the original act in the Parliamentary Archives.

== Public general acts ==
| Short title | Citation | Royal assent |
Long title
| Supply and Appropriation (Anticipation and Adjustments) Act 2012 | 2012 c. 1 | 8 March 2012 |
An Act to authorise the use of resources for the years ending with 31 March 2012 and 31 March 2013; to authorise the issue of sums out of the Consolidated Fund for those years and for the year ending with 31 March 2011; and to appropriate the supply authorised by this Act for the years ending with 31 March 2011 and 31 March 2012.
| Live Music Act 2012 | 2012 c. 2 | 8 March 2012 |
An Act to amend the Licensing Act 2003 (Note: Licensing Act 2003 (c. 17)) with respect to the performance of live music entertainment; and for connected purposes.
| Public Services (Social Value) Act 2012 | 2012 c. 3 | 8 March 2012 |
An Act to require public authorities to have regard to economic, social and environmental well-being in connection with public services contracts; and for connected purposes.
| Domestic Violence, Crime and Victims (Amendment) Act 2012 | 2012 c. 4 | 8 March 2012 |
An Act to amend section 5 of the Domestic Violence, Crime and Victims Act 2004 (Note: Domestic Violence, Crime and Victims Act 2004 (c. 28)) to include serious harm to a child or vulnerable adult; to make consequential amendments to the Act; and for connected purposes.
| Welfare Reform Act 2012 | 2012 c. 5 | 8 March 2012 |
An Act to make provision for universal credit and personal independence payment; to make other provision about social security and tax credits; to make provision about the functions of the registration service, child support maintenance and the use of jobcentres; to establish the Social Mobility and Child Poverty Commission and otherwise amend the Child Poverty Act 2010; (Note: Child Poverty Act 2010 (c. 9)) and for connected purposes.
| Consumer Insurance (Disclosure and Representations) Act 2012 | 2012 c. 6 | 8 March 2012 |
An Act to make provision about disclosure and representations in connection with consumer insurance contracts.
| Health and Social Care Act 2012 | 2012 c. 7 | 27 March 2012 |
An Act to establish and make provision about a National Health Service Commissioning Board and clinical commissioning groups and to make other provision about the National Health Service in England; to make provision about public health in the United Kingdom; to make provision about regulating health and adult social care services; to make provision about public involvement in health and social care matters, scrutiny of health matters by local authorities and co-operation between local authorities and commissioners of health care services; to make provision about regulating health and social care workers; to establish and make provision about a National Institute for Health and Care Excellence; to establish and make provision about a Health and Social Care Information Centre and to make other provision about information relating to health or social care matters; to abolish certain public bodies involved in health or social care; to make other provision about health care; and for connected purposes.
| Water Industry (Financial Assistance) Act 2012 | 2012 c. 8 | 1 May 2012 |
An Act to make provision for the giving of financial assistance for the purpose of securing the reduction of charges for the supply of water and the provision of sewerage services and in connection with the construction of, and the carrying out of works in respect of, water and sewerage infrastructure.
| Protection of Freedoms Act 2012 | 2012 c. 9 | 1 May 2012 |
An Act to provide for the destruction, retention, use and other regulation of certain evidential material; to impose consent and other requirements in relation to certain processing of biometric information relating to children; to provide for a code of practice about surveillance camera systems and for the appointment and role of the Surveillance Camera Commissioner; to provide for judicial approval in relation to certain authorisations and notices under the Regulation of Investigatory Powers Act 2000; (Note: Regulation of Investigatory Powers Act 2000 (c. 23)) to provide for the repeal or rewriting of powers of entry and associated powers and for codes of practice and other safeguards in relation to such powers; to make provision about vehicles left on land; to amend the maximum detention period for terrorist suspects; to replace certain stop and search powers and to provide for a related code of practice; to make provision about the safeguarding of vulnerable groups and about criminal records including provision for the establishment of the Disclosure and Barring Service and the dissolution of the Independent Safeguarding Authority; to disregard convictions and cautions for certain abolished offences; to make provision about the release and publication of datasets held by public authorities and to make other provision about freedom of information and the Information Commissioner; to make provision about the trafficking of people for exploitation and about stalking; to repeal certain enactments; and for connected purposes.
| Legal Aid, Sentencing and Punishment of Offenders Act 2012 | 2012 c. 10 | 1 May 2012 |
An Act to make provision about legal aid; to make further provision about funding legal services; to make provision about costs and other amounts awarded in civil and criminal proceedings; to make provision about referral fees in connection with the provision of legal services; to make provision about sentencing offenders, including provision about release on licence or otherwise; to make provision about the collection of fines and other sums; to make provision about bail and about remand otherwise than on bail; to make provision about the employment, payment and transfer of persons detained in prisons and other institutions; to make provision about penalty notices for disorderly behaviour and cautions; to make provision about the rehabilitation of offenders; to create new offences of threatening with a weapon in public or on school premises and of causing serious injury by dangerous driving; to create a new offence relating to squatting; to increase penalties for offences relating to scrap metal dealing and to create a new offence relating to payment for scrap metal; and to amend section 76 of the Criminal Justice and Immigration Act 2008. (Note: Criminal Justice and Immigration Act 2008 (c. 4))
| Scotland Act 2012 | 2012 c. 11 | 1 May 2012 |
An Act to amend the Scotland Act 1998 (Note: Scotland Act 1998 (c. 46)) and make provision about the functions of the Scottish Ministers; and for connected purposes.
| Sunday Trading (London Olympic Games and Paralympic Games) Act 2012 | 2012 c. 12 | 1 May 2012 |
An Act to suspend restrictions on Sunday trading hours for the period of the London Olympic Games and Paralympic Games; and for connected purposes.
| Supply and Appropriation (Main Estimates) Act 2012 | 2012 c. 13 | 17 July 2012 |
An Act to authorise the use of resources for the year ending with 31 March 2013; to authorise both the issue of sums out of the Consolidated Fund and the application of income for that year; and to appropriate the supply authorised for that year by this Act and by the Supply and Appropriation (Anticipation and Adjustments) Act 2012. (Note: Supply and Appropriation (Anticipation and Adjustments) Act 2012 (c. 1))
| Finance Act 2012 | 2012 c. 14 | 17 July 2012 |
An Act to grant certain duties, to alter other duties, and to amend the law relating to the National Debt and the Public Revenue, and to make further provision in connection with finance.
| European Union (Approval of Treaty Amendment Decision) Act 2012 (repealed) | 2012 c. 15 | 31 October 2012 |
An Act to make provision for the purposes of section 3 of the European Union Act 2011 (Note: European Union Act 2011 (c. 12)) in relation to the European Council decision of 25 March 2011 amending Article 136 of the Treaty on the Functioning of the European Union with regard to a stability mechanism for Member States whose currency is the euro. (Repealed by European Union (Withdrawal) Act 2018 (c. 16))
| Infrastructure (Financial Assistance) Act 2012 | 2012 c. 16 | 31 October 2012 |
An Act to make provision in connection with the giving of financial assistance in respect of the provision of infrastructure.
| Local Government Finance Act 2012 | 2012 c. 17 | 31 October 2012 |
An Act to make provision about non-domestic rating; to make provision about grants to local authorities; to make provision about council tax; to make provision about the supply of information for purposes relating to rates in Northern Ireland; and for connected purposes.
| Mental Health (Approval Functions) Act 2012 | 2012 c. 18 | 31 October 2012 |
An Act to authorise things done before the day on which this Act is passed in the purported exercise of functions relating to the approval of registered medical practitioners and clinicians under the Mental Health Act 1983. (Note: Mental Health Act 1983 (c. 20))
| Civil Aviation Act 2012 | 2012 c. 19 | 19 December 2012 |
An Act to make provision about the regulation of operators of dominant airports; to confer functions on the Civil Aviation Authority under competition legislation in relation to services provided at airports; to make provision about aviation security; to make provision about the regulation of provision of flight accommodation; to make further provision about the Civil Aviation Authority's membership, administration and functions in relation to enforcement, regulatory burdens and the provision of information relating to aviation; and for connected purposes.
| Prisons (Interference with Wireless Telegraphy) Act 2012 | 2012 c. 20 | 19 December 2012 |
An Act to make provision about interference with wireless telegraphy in prisons and similar institutions.
| Financial Services Act 2012 | 2012 c. 21 | 19 December 2012 |
An Act to amend the Bank of England Act 1998, (Note: Bank of England Act 1998 (c. 11)) the Financial Services and Markets Act 2000 (Note: Financial Services and Markets Act 2000 (c. 8)) and the Banking Act 2009; (Note: Banking Act 2009 (c. 1)) to make other provision about financial services and markets; to make provision about the exercise of certain statutory functions relating to building societies, friendly societies and other mutual societies; to amend section 785 of the Companies Act 2006; (Note: Companies Act 2006 (c. 46)) to make provision enabling the Director of Savings to provide services to other public bodies; and for connected purposes.
| Police (Complaints and Conduct) Act 2012 | 2012 c. 22 | 19 December 2012 |
An Act to make provision about interviews held during certain investigations under Schedule 3 to the Police Reform Act 2002; (Note: Police Reform Act 2002 (c. 30)) and about the application of Part 2 of that Act to matters occurring before 1 April 2004.
| Small Charitable Donations Act 2012 | 2012 c. 23 | 19 December 2012 |
An Act to provide for the making of payments to certain charities and clubs in respect of certain gifts made to them by individuals; and for connected purposes.

== Local acts ==
| Short title | Citation | Royal assent |
Long title
| Bank of Ireland (UK) plc Act 2012 | 2012 c. i | 8 March 2012 |
An Act to provide that the statutory right of The Governor and Company of the Bank of Ireland to issue banknotes shall transfer and apply to Bank of Ireland (UK) plc; and for connected purposes.
| London Local Authorities Act 2012 | 2012 c. ii | 27 March 2012 |
An Act to confer further powers upon local authorities in London; and for related purposes.

== See also ==
- List of acts of the Parliament of the United Kingdom
