= Marine Insurance Act 1745 =

Act of the Parliament of Great Britain

Marine Insurance Act 1745 (Note: The citation of this act by this short title was authorised by section 1 of, and the first schedule to, the Short Titles Act 1896. Due to the repeal of those provisions it is now authorised by section 19(2) of the Interpretation Act 1978.)
- Act of Parliament
- Parliament of Great Britain
- Long title: An Act to regulate Insurance on Ships belonging to the Subjects of Great Britain, and on Merchandizes or Effects laden thereon.
- Citation: 19 Geo. 2. c. 37
- Territorial extent: Great Britain

Dates
- Royal assent: 12 August 1746
- Commencement: 1 August 1746 (Note: Section 1.)
- Repealed: 1 January 1907
Other legislation
Amended by	Statute Law Revision Act 1867; Statute Law Revision and Civil Procedure Act 1883; Statute Law Revision Act 1888
Repealed by	Marine Insurance Act 1906
Relates to	Life Assurance Act 1774; Insurances on Ships, etc. Act 1785; Marine Insurance Act 1788; Policies of Marine Assurance Act 1868

Status: Repealed

Text of statute as originally enacted

The Marine Insurance Act 1745 (19 Geo. 2. c. 37) was an act of the Parliament of Great Britain. The act has been described as "the first significant statutory intervention in substantive marine insurance law".

== Background ==
The purpose of the act was to put an end to the practice of wagering disguised as insurance upon marine vessels. Persons who had no commercial interest in a marine cargo would take out a policy of insurance in the marine form, essentially gambling upon whether or not the ship would safely arrive at its destination. Concern was expressed that, apart from general policies against gambling, this also created a positive incentive for certain parties to overload ships and ensure that they were dispatched in risky condition.

Accordingly, the act introduced into English law for the first time the requirement of an "insurable interest" in the subject matter of a policy of insurance. This requirement was later replicated for life insurance in the Life Assurance Act 1774. Neither statute sought to define an insurable interest, and it was not until the decision of the courts in Lucena v Craufurd in 1806 that an insurable interest was first defined as "A right in the property, or a right derivable out of some contract about the property, which in either case may be lost upon some contingency affecting the possession or enjoyment of the party."

== Provisions ==
The act was relatively short. The text of its first section (including the preamble) is set out below:

WHEREAS it hath been found by Experience, that the making Assurances, Interest or no Interest, or without further Proof of Interest than the Policy, hath been productive of many pernicious Practices, whereby great Numbers of Ships, with their Cargoes, have either been fraudulently lost and destroyed, or taken by the Enemy in Time of War; and such Assurances have encouraged the Exportation of Wooll, and the carrying on many other prohibited and clandestine Trades, which by Means of such Assurances have been concealed, and the Parties concerned secured from Loss, as well to the Diminution of the public Revenue, as to the great Detriment of fair Traders; and by introducing a mischievous kind of Gaming or Wagering, under the Pretence of assuring the Risque on Shipping, and fair Trade, the Institution and laudable Design of making Assurances, hath been perverted; and that which was intended for the Encouragement of Trade and Navigation, has, in many Instances, become hurtful of, and destructive to the same: For Remedy whereof, be it enacted by the King's most Excellent Majesty, by and with the Advice and Consent of the Lords Spiritual and Temporal, and Commons, in this present Parliament assembled, and by the Authority of the same, That from and after the first Day of August one thousand seven hundred and forty-six, no Assurance or Assurances shall be made by any Person or Persons, Bodies Corporate or Politick, on any Ship or Ships belonging to his Majesty, or any of his Subjects, or on any Goods, Merchandizes or Effects laden or to be laden on Board of any such Ship or Ships, Interest or no Interest, or without further Proof or Interest than the Policy, or by way of Gaming or Wagering, or without Benefit of Salvage to the Assurer; and that every such Assurance shall be null and void to all Intents and Purposes.

== Subsequent developments ==
The act remained substantively in force until it was incorporated into and repealed by section 92 of, and the second schedule to, the Marine Insurance Act 1906 (8 Edw. 7. c. 41), which came into force on 1 January 907.
