= Life Assurance Act 1774 =

Act of the Parliament of Great Britain

Life Assurance Act 1774 (Note: The citation of this act by this short title was authorised by section 1 of, and the first schedule to, the Short Titles Act 1896. Due to the repeal of those provisions it is now authorised by section 19(2) of the Interpretation Act 1978.)
- Act of Parliament
- Parliament of Great Britain
- Long title: An Act for regulating Insurances upon Lives, and for prohibiting all such Insurances except in cases where the Persons insuring shall have an Interest in the Life or Death of the Persons insured.
- Citation: 14 Geo. 3. c. 48
- Territorial extent: Great Britain

Dates
- Royal assent: 20 May 1774
- Commencement: 20 May 1774 (Note: Section 1.)
Other legislation
| Amended by | Life Insurance (Ireland) Act 1866; Statute Law Revision Act 1888; National Insurance (Amendment) Act 1972; Adoption Act 1976; Children Act 1989; Children (Northern Ireland) Order 1995; Police Act 1997 (Provisions in relation to the NCIS Service Authority) Order 1998; Civil Partnership Act 2004 |
| Relates to | Marine Insurance Act 1745 |

Status: Amended

Text of statute as originally enacted

Revised text of statute as amended

Text of the Life Assurance Act 1774 as in force today (including any amendments) within the United Kingdom, from legislation.gov.uk.

The Life Assurance Act 1774 (14 Geo. 3. c. 48, also known as the Gambling Act 1774 (Note: Long title: An Act for regulating Insurances upon Lives, and for prohibiting all such Insurances except in cases where the Persons insuring shall have an Interest in the Life or Death of the Persons insured)) is an act of the Parliament of Great Britain, which received royal assent on 20 April 1774. The act prevented the abuse of the life insurance system to evade gambling laws. It was extended to Ireland by the Life Insurance (Ireland) Act 1866 (29 & 30 Vict. c. 42), and is still in force. Prior to the act, it was legally possible for any person to take out life insurance on any other person, regardless of whether or not the beneficiary of the policy had any legitimate interest in the person whose life was insured. As such, the system of life insurance provided a legal loophole for a form of gambling: an insurance policy could be taken out on an unrelated third party, stipulating whether or not they would die before a set date, and relying on chance to determine if the "insurer" or "policy-holder" would profit by this event.

== Provisions ==
The act has only four sections:

- Section 1 seeks to deal with these abuses by stipulating that henceforth no assurance is to be made on the life of any person or persons, or on any other event, where the person for whose use the policy was made had "no interest" in the matter, or if it were clearly done for the intent of "gaming or wagering", and that any assurance made contrary to this requirement was deemed null and void.
- To aid in preventing this, section 2 required that any such policy include the names of the persons who stood to benefit by it.
- Section 3 stipulated that, in all cases where the insured party had a legitimate interest in the life or event, they did not recover more than the value of their interest from the policy, guarding against the related abuse of deliberate overinsuring.
- For the avoidance of doubt, section 4 stated that the act did not extend to legitimate insurances of ships, goods or merchandise. Gaming or wagering in relation to British ships and merchandise was already prohibited by the Marine Insurance Act 1745 (19 Geo. 2. c. 37).

Sections 2 and 3 were amended by the Statute Law Revision Act 1888, and the requirement in section 2 to name the beneficiaries of a life insurance policy was relaxed by section 50 of the National Insurance (Amendment) Act 1972, to allow insurance for a defined class or description of person.

The defendant company in the important contract law case of Carlill v. Carbolic Smoke Ball Company (1898) had attempted unsuccessfully to rely the sections to avoid paying the claimant the fixed sum (£100), to any customer, for suffering from influenza despite using the ball. Such defence would have required the law viewing the reward as more of an assurance policy than a term suitable for a goods contract.

== Effects ==
The act did not define what an "insurable interest" was, and it has since been held as the definite expectation of suffering a financial loss directly due to someone's death. It is generally accepted that a person has an insurable interest in the life of someone financially supporting them - for example, in the life of their parent whilst they are still a juvenile - but that this interest can cease if the situation changes. In a 1904 case, it was held that a man insuring the life of his elderly mother to pay funeral expenses, where he was not at all dependent upon her, was void. However, note that as long as an insurable interest existed at the time the policy was created, it remains valid even if the interest later ceases.

A person is considered to have an unlimited interest in their own life or in that of their spouse, a case the law considers broadly equivalent; even if not financially dependent on the other, it is legitimate to insure against their death. This does not reliably extend to cohabiting couples, however: whilst many insurers will accept such policies, as they have not been tested in court some could be invalid. Since the 2000s strong moves have intensified to pass clear statutory provisions in this regard, which have not yet borne fruit. The applicability to spouses was extended to civil partners under section 253 of the Civil Partnership Act 2004.

The act co-governs (with other law) policies of life insurance, including investments that are packaged under the umbrella of life assurance, such as endowment policies used to pay off mortgages.
