= Appropriation Act =

Type of Act of Parliament in Britain

An Appropriation Act is an act of the Parliament of the United Kingdom which, like a Consolidated Fund Act, allows the Treasury to issue funds out of the Consolidated Fund. Unlike a Consolidated Fund Act, an Appropriation Act also "appropriates" the funds, that is allocates the funds issued out of the Consolidated Fund to individual government departments and Crown bodies. Appropriation Acts were formerly passed by the Parliament of Great Britain.

== Format ==
Each Appropriation Act has a series of schedules which contain tables that set out how the monies issued out of the Consolidated Fund are appropriated. Each department or body which has money appropriated is noted in the tables which contain columns setting out the things the money appropriated may be spent on, the net resources authorised for use, the grants out of the Consolidated Fund, the operating appropriations in aid and the non-operating appropriations in aid. The money may not be spent for purposes other than that it is appropriated for and it must be spent by the end of the fiscal year covered by that appropriation or returned to the Consolidated Fund.

The typical structure of such an act begins with the long title, which defines which financial years the act applies to. This is followed by the preamble, which is different from the normal British public general Act of Parliament preamble in that it includes additional text before the normal preamble:

Whereas the Commons of the United Kingdom in Parliament assembled have resolved to authorise the use of resources and the issue of sums out of the Consolidated Fund towards making good the supply which they have granted to His Majesty in this Session of Parliament:—

Be it therefore enacted by the King's most Excellent Majesty, by and with the advice and consent of the Lords Spiritual and Temporal, and Commons, in this present Parliament assembled, and by the authority of the same, as follows:—

Until 2000 an older form of preamble was used:

Most Gracious Sovereign, WE, Your Majesty's most dutiful and loyal subjects, the Commons of the United Kingdom in Parliament assembled, towards making good the supply which we have cheerfully granted to Your Majesty in this Session of Parliament, have resolved to grant unto Your Majesty the sums hereinafter mentioned; and do therefore most humbly beseech Your Majesty that it may be enacted and be it enacted by the Queen's most Excellent Majesty, by and with the advice and consent of the Lords Spiritual and Temporal, and Commons, in this present Parliament assembled, and by the authority of the same, as follows:—

Each Appropriation Act typically covers two or more fiscal years, and will normally repeal earlier Appropriation Acts and Consolidated Fund Acts still on the statute books.

== Effect ==
An Appropriation Act normally becomes spent on the conclusion of the financial year to which it relates.

== List ==
=== 18th century ===
Appropriation Act 1775
- Act of Parliament
- Parliament of Great Britain
- Long title: An Act for granting to His Majesty a certain Sum of Money out of the Sinking Fund, and for applying certain Monies therein mentioned for the Service of the Year One thousand seven hundred and seventy-five; and for further appropriating the Supplies granted in this Session of Parliament.
- Citation: 15 Geo. 3. c. 42
- Territorial extent: Great Britain

Dates
- Royal assent: 26 May 1775
- Commencement: 29 November 1774 (Note: Start of session.)
- Repealed: 21 August 1871
Other legislation
Repealed by	Statute Law Revision Act 1871
Relates to	Appropriation Act 1776

Status: Repealed

Text of statute as originally enacted

- The act 15 Geo. 3. c. 42 (1775)

Appropriation Act 1776
- Act of Parliament
- Parliament of Great Britain
- Long title: An Act for granting to His Majesty a certain Sum of Money out of the Sinking Fund, and for applying certain Monies therein mentioned for the Service of the Year One thousand seven hundred and seventy-six; and for further appropriating the Supplies granted in this Session of Parliament; for giving further Relief to the Widows of Commission and Warrant Officers of the Royal Navy; and for making, forth Duplicates of Exchequer Bills, Lottery Tickets, Certificates, Receipts, Annuity Orders, and other Orders, loft, burnt, or destroyed.
- Citation: 17 Geo. 3. c. 47
- Territorial extent: Great Britain

Dates
- Royal assent: 23 May 1776
- Commencement: 31 October 1776
- Repealed: 21 August 1871
Other legislation
Repealed by	Statute Law Revision Act 1871
Relates to	Appropriation Act 1775

Status: Repealed

Text of statute as originally enacted

- The Appropriation Act 1776 (17 Geo. 3. c. 47)

Appropriation Act 1778
- Act of Parliament
- Parliament of Great Britain
- Long title: An Act for granting to His Majesty a certain Sum of Money out of the Sinking Fund, and for applying certain Monies therein mentioned, for the Service of the Year One thousand seven hundred and seventy-eight; and for further appropriating the Supplies granted in this Session of Parliament; and for carrying to the Aggregate Fund, a Sum of Money which hath arisen by the Two Sevenths Excise.
- Citation: 18 Geo. 3. c. 54
- Territorial extent: Great Britain

Dates
- Royal assent: 3 June 1778
- Commencement: 20 November 1777
- Repealed: 21 August 1871
Other legislation
Repealed by	Statute Law Revision Act 1871

Status: Repealed

Text of statute as originally enacted

- The Appropriation Act 1778 (18 Geo. 3. c. 54)

Appropriation Act 1784
- Act of Parliament
- Parliament of Great Britain
- Long title: An Act for granting to His Majesty a certain Sum of Money out of the Sinking Fund, and for applying certain Monies therein mentioned for the Service of the Year One thousand seven hundred and eighty-four, for appropriating the Monies arising by the Duties on Malt, Mum, Cyder, and Perry; and also by a Land Tax granted to His Majesty by Two Acts made in the last Session of Parliament; and for further appropriating the Supplies granted in this Session of Parliament.
- Citation: 24 Geo. 3. Sess. 2. c. 44
- Territorial extent: Great Britain

Dates
- Royal assent: 19 August 1784
- Commencement: 18 May 1784
- Repealed: 21 August 1871
Other legislation
Repealed by	Statute Law Revision Act 1871

Status: Repealed

Text of statute as originally enacted

- The Appropriation Act 1784 (24 Geo. 3. Sess. 2. c. 44)

Appropriation Act 1790
- Act of Parliament
- Parliament of Great Britain
- Long title: An Act for granting to His Majesty a certain Sum of Money out of the Consolidated Fund, for applying certain Monies therein mentioned, for the Service of the Year One thousand seven hundred and ninety; and for further appropriating the Supplies granted in this Session of Parliament.
- Citation: 30 Geo. 3. c. 32
- Territorial extent: Great Britain

Dates
- Royal assent: 10 June 1790
- Commencement: 21 January 1790
- Repealed: 21 August 1871
Other legislation
Repealed by	Statute Law Revision Act 1871

Status: Repealed

Text of statute as originally enacted

- The Appropriation Act 1790 (30 Geo. 3. c. 32)

Appropriation Act 1795
- Act of Parliament
- Parliament of Great Britain
- Long title: An Act for granting to His Majesty a certain Sum of Money out of the Consolidated Fund; for the Service of the Year One thousand seven hundred and ninety five; and for further appropriating the Supplies granted in this Session of Parliament.
- Citation: 35 Geo. 3. c. 120
- Territorial extent: Great Britain

Dates
- Royal assent: 26 June 1795
- Commencement: 26 June 1795 (Note: The Acts of Parliament (Commencement) Act 1793.)
- Repealed: 21 August 1871
Other legislation
Repealed by	Statute Law Revision 1871

Status: Repealed

Text of statute as originally enacted

- The Appropriation Act 1795 (35 Geo. 3. c. 120)

Appropriation Act 1796
- Act of Parliament
- Parliament of Great Britain
- Long title: An Act for granting to His Majesty a certain Sum of Money out of the Consolidated Fund, for the Service of the Year One thousand seven hundred and ninety six; and for further appropriating the Supplies granted in this Session of Parliament.
- Citation: 36 Geo. 3. c. 126
- Territorial extent: Great Britain

Dates
- Royal assent: 19 May 1796
- Commencement: 19 May 1796
- Repealed: 21 August 1871
Other legislation
Repealed by	Statute Law Revision Act 1871

Status: Repealed

Text of statute as originally enacted

- The Appropriation Act 1796 (36 Geo. 3. c. 126)

Appropriation Act 1797
- Act of Parliament
- Parliament of Great Britain
- Long title: An Act for granting to His Majesty a certain Sum of Money out of the Consolidated Fund, and for applying certain Monies therein mentioned, for the Service of the Year One thousand seven hundred and ninety-seven; for further appropriating the Supplies granted in this Session of Parliament; and for making forth Duplicates of Exchequer Bills, Lottery Tickets, Certificates, Receipts, Annuity Orders, or other Orders, lost, burnt or otherwise destroyed.
- Citation: 37 Geo. 3. c. 144
- Territorial extent: Great Britain

Dates
- Royal assent: 20 July 1797
- Commencement: 20 July 179
- Repealed: 21 August 1871
Other legislation
Repealed by	Statute Law Revision Act 1871

Status: Repealed

Text of statute as originally enacted

- The Appropriation Act 1797 (37 Geo. 3. c. 144)

Appropriation Act 1798
- Act of Parliament
- Parliament of Great Britain
- Long title: An Act for enabling His Majesty to raise the Sum of one million for the Uses and Purposes therein mentioned, and for applying a certain Sum of Money therein mentioned for the Service of the Year One thousand seven hundred and ninety eight; and for further appropriating the Supplies granted in this Session of Parliament; and for making forth Duplicates of Exchequer Bills, Lottery Tickets, Certificates, Receipts, Annuity Orders or other Orders, lost burnt or otherwise destroyed.
- Citation: 38 Geo. 3. c. 90
- Territorial extent: Great Britain

Dates
- Royal assent: 29 June 1798
- Commencement: 29 June 1798
- Repealed: 21 August 1871
Other legislation
Repealed by	Statute Law Revision Act 1871

Status: Repealed

Text of statute as originally enacted

- The Appropriation Act 1798 (38 Geo. 3. c. 90)

Appropriation Act 1799
- Act of Parliament
- Parliament of Great Britain
- Long title: An Act for granting to His Majesty a certain Sum of Money out of the Consolidated Fund; for applying certain Sums of Money therein mentioned, for the Service of the Year One thousand seven hundred and ninety nine; and for further appropriating the Supplies granted in this Session of Parliament.
- Citation: 39 Geo. 3. c. 114
- Territorial extent: Great Britain

Dates
- Royal assent: 12 July 1799
- Commencement: 12 July 1799
- Repealed: 21 August 1871
Other legislation
Repealed by	Statute Law Revision Act 1871

Status: Repealed

Text of statute as originally enacted

- The act 39 Geo. 3. c. 114 (1799)

=== 19th century ===
==== 1800s ====
Appropriation Act 1800
- Act of Parliament
- Parliament of the United Kingdom
- Long title: An Act for raising a certain Sum of Money by Loans or Exchequer Bills, for the Service of the Year one thousand eight hundred and one; and for appropriating the Supplies granted in this Session of Parliament.
- Citation: 41 Geo. 3. (G.B.) c. 14
- Territorial extent: Great Britain

Dates
- Royal assent: 31 December 1800
- Commencement: 31 December 1800
- Repealed: 21 August 1871
Other legislation
Repealed by	Statute Law Revision Act 1871

Status: Repealed

Text of statute as originally enacted

- The Appropriation, etc. Act 1801 (41 Geo. 3. (U.K.) c. 84)

Appropriation Act 1802
- Act of Parliament
- Parliament of the United Kingdom
- Long title: An act for granting to his Majesty certain Sums of Money out of the respective Consolidated Funds of Great Britain and Ireland; for applying certain Monies therein mentioned, for the Service of the Year One thousand eight hundred and two; and for further appropriating the Supplies granted in this Session of Parliament.
- Citation: 42 Geo. 3. c. 120
- Territorial extent: United Kingdom

Dates
- Royal assent: 28 June 1802
- Commencement: 28 June 1802
- Repealed: 6 August 1872
Other legislation
Repealed by	Statute Law Revision Act 1872

Status: Repealed

Text of statute as originally enacted

- The Appropriation Act 1802 (42 Geo. 3. c. 120)

Appropriation Act 1803
- Act of Parliament
- Parliament of the United Kingdom
- Long title: An act for granting to his Majesty certain Sums of Money out of the respective Consolidated Funds of Great Britain and Ireland; for applying certain Monies therein mentioned for the Service of the Year One thousand eight hundred and three; and for further appropriating the Supplies granted in this Session of Parliament.
- Citation: 43 Geo. 3. c. 162
- Territorial extent: United Kingdom

Dates
- Royal assent: 12 August 1803
- Commencement: 12 August 1803
- Repealed: 6 August 1872
Other legislation
Repealed by	Statute Law Revision Act 1872

Status: Repealed

Text of statute as originally enacted

- The Appropriation Act 1803 (43 Geo. 3. c. 162)

Appropriation Act 1804
- Act of Parliament
- Parliament of the United Kingdom
- Long title: An act for granting to his Majesty a certain Sum of Money out of the Consolidated Fund of Great Britain, and for applying a certain Sum of Money therein mentioned for the Service of Great Britain, for the Year One thousand eight hundred and four; and for further appropriating the Supplies granted in this Session of Parliament.
- Citation: 44 Geo. 3. c. 110
- Territorial extent: United Kingdom

Dates
- Royal assent: 31 July 1804
- Commencement: 31 July 1804
- Repealed: 6 August 1872
Other legislation
Repealed by	Statute Law Revision Act 1872

Status: Repealed

Text of statute as originally enacted

- The Appropriation Act 1804 (44 Geo. 3. c. 110)

Appropriation Act 1805
- Act of Parliament
- Parliament of the United Kingdom
- Long title: An Act for granting to his Majesty a certain fund of money out of the consolidated fund of Great Britain; and for applying certain monies therein-mentioned for the service of Great Britain, for the year one thousand eight hundred and five; and for further appropriating the supplies granted in this session of parliament.
- Citation: 45 Geo. 3. c. 129
- Territorial extent: United Kingdom

Dates
- Royal assent: 12 July 1805
- Commencement: 12 July 1805
- Repealed: 6 August 1872
Other legislation
Repealed by	Statute Law Revision Act 1872

Status: Repealed

Text of statute as originally enacted

- The Appropriation Act 1805 (45 Geo. 3. c. 129)

Appropriation Act 1806
- Act of Parliament
- Parliament of the United Kingdom
- Long title: An Act for granting to his Majesty a certain sum of money out of the consolidated fund of Great Britain for the year one thousand eight hundred and six; and for further appropriating the supplies granted in this session of parliament.
- Citation: 46 Geo. 3. c. 149
- Territorial extent: United Kingdom

Dates
- Royal assent: 22 July 1806
- Commencement: 22 July 1806
- Repealed: 6 August 1872
Other legislation
Repealed by	Statute Law Revision Act 1872

Status: Repealed

Text of statute as originally enacted

- The Appropriation Act 1806 (46 Geo. 3. c. 149)

Appropriation Act 1807
- Act of Parliament
- Parliament of the United Kingdom
- Long title: An Act for granting to His Majesty a certain Sum of Money out of the Consolidated Fund of Great Britain, and for applying certain Monies therein mentioned for the Service of the Year One thousand eight hundred and seven, and for further appropriating the Supplies granted in this Session of Parliament.
- Citation: 47 Geo. 3. Sess. 2. c. 76
- Territorial extent: United Kingdom

Dates
- Royal assent: 14 August 1807
- Commencement: 14 August 180
- Repealed: 10 August 1872
Other legislation
Repealed by	Statute Law Revision Act 1872 (No. 2)

Status: Repealed

Text of statute as originally enacted

- The Appropriation Act 1807 (47 Geo. 3 Sess. 2. c. 76)

Appropriation Act 1808
- Act of Parliament
- Parliament of the United Kingdom
- Long title: An Act for granting to His Majesty a certain Sum of Money out of the Consolidated Fund of Great Britain, and for applying certain Monies therein mentioned for the Service of the Year One thousand eight hundred and eight; and for further appropriating the Supplies granted in this Session of Parliament.
- Citation: 48 Geo. 3. c. 148
- Territorial extent: United Kingdom

Dates
- Royal assent: 2 July 1808
- Commencement: 2 July 1808
- Repealed: 10 August 1872
Other legislation
Repealed by	Statute Law Revision Act 1872 (No. 2)

Status: Repealed

Text of statute as originally enacted

- The Appropriation Act 1808 (48 Geo. 3. c. 148)

Appropriation Act 1809
- Act of Parliament
- Parliament of the United Kingdom
- Long title: An Act for granting to His Majesty certain Sums of Money out of the Consolidated Fund of Great Britain, and for applying certain Monies therein-mentioned for the Service of the Year One thousand eight hundred and nine; and for further appropriating the Supplies granted in this Session of Parliament.
- Citation: 49 Geo. 3. c. 128
- Territorial extent: United Kingdom

Dates
- Royal assent: 20 June 1809
- Commencement: 20 June 1809
- Repealed: 10 August 1872
Other legislation
Repealed by	Statute Law Revision Act 1872 (No. 2)

Status: Repealed

Text of statute as originally enacted

- The Appropriation Act 1809 (49 Geo. 3. c. 128)

==== 1810s ====
Appropriation Act 1810
- Act of Parliament
- Parliament of the United Kingdom
- Long title: An act for granting to His Majesty certain Sums of Money out of the Consolidated Fund of Great Britain, and for applying certain Monies therein mentioned, for the Service of the Year One thousand eight hundred and ten; and for further appropriating the Supplies granted in this Session of Parliament.
- Citation: 50 Geo. 3. c. 115
- Territorial extent: United Kingdom

Dates
- Royal assent: 20 June 1810
- Commencement: 20 June 1810
- Repealed: 10 August 1872
Other legislation
Repealed by	Statute Law Revision Act 1872 (No. 2)

Status: Repealed

Text of statute as originally enacted

- The Appropriation Act 1810 (50 Geo. 3. c. 115)

Appropriation Act 1811
- Act of Parliament
- Parliament of the United Kingdom
- Long title: An act for granting to His Majesty certain Sums of Money out of the Consolidated Fund of Great Britain; and for applying certain Monies therein mentioned, for the Service of the Year One thousand eight hundred and eleven; and for further appropriating the Supplies granted in this Session of Parliament.
- Citation: 51 Geo. 3. c. 117
- Territorial extent: United Kingdom

Dates
- Royal assent: 26 June 1811
- Commencement: 26 June 1811
- Repealed: 5 August 1873
Other legislation
Repealed by	Statute Law Revision Act 1873

Status: Repealed

Text of statute as originally enacted

- The Appropriation Act 1811 (51 Geo. 3. c. 117)

Appropriation Act 1812
- Act of Parliament
- Parliament of the United Kingdom
- Long title: An Act for granting to His Majesty certain Sums of Money out of the Consolidated Fund of Great Britain, and for applying certain Monies therein mentioned for the Service of the Year One thousand eight hundred and twelve; and for further appropriating the Supplies granted in this Session of Parliament.
- Citation: 52 Geo. 3. c. 154
- Territorial extent: United Kingdom

Dates
- Royal assent: 28 July 1812
- Commencement: 28 July 1812
- Repealed: 5 August 1873
Other legislation
Repealed by	Statute Law Revision Act 1873]

Status: Repealed

Text of statute as originally enacted

- The Appropriation Act 1812 (52 Geo. 3. c. 154)

Appropriation Act 1816
- Act of Parliament
- Parliament of the United Kingdom
- Long title: An act for granting to His Majesty a certain Sum out of the Consolidated Fund of Great Britain, and for applying certain Monies therein mentioned for the Service of the Year One thousand eight hundred and sixteen; and for further appropriating the Supplies granted in this Session of Parliament.
- Citation: 56 Geo. 3. c. 142
- Territorial extent: United Kingdom

Dates
- Royal assent: 2 July 1816
- Commencement: 2 July 1816
- Repealed: 5 August 1873
Other legislation
Repealed by	Statute Law Revision Act 1873

Status: Repealed

Text of statute as originally enacted

- The Appropriation Act 1816 (56 Geo. 3. c. 142)

Appropriation Act 1817
- Act of Parliament
- Parliament of the United Kingdom
- Long title: An act for applying certain Monies therein mentioned for the Service of the Year One thousand eight hundred and seventeen, and for further appropriating the Supplies granted in this Session of Parliament.
- Citation: 57 Geo. 3. c. 132
- Territorial extent: United Kingdom

Dates
- Royal assent: 12 July 1817
- Commencement: 12 July 1817
- Repealed: 5 August 1873
Other legislation
Repealed by	Statute Law Revision Act 1873

Status: Repealed

Text of statute as originally enacted

- The Appropriation Act 1817 (57 Geo. 3. c. 132)

Appropriation Act 1818
- Act of Parliament
- Parliament of the United Kingdom
- Long title: An act for applying certain Monies therein mentioned for the Service of the Year One thousand eight hundred and eighteen.
- Citation: 58 Geo. 3. c. 101
- Territorial extent: United Kingdom

Dates
- Royal assent: 10 June 1818
- Commencement: 10 June 1818
- Repealed: 5 August 1873
Other legislation
Repealed by	Statute Law Revision Act 1873

Status: Repealed

Text of statute as originally enacted

- The Appropriation Act 1818 (58 Geo. 3. c. 101)

Appropriation Act 1819
- Act of Parliament
- Parliament of the United Kingdom
- Long title: An act for applying certain Monies therein mentioned for the Service of the Year One thousand eight hundred and nineteen; and for further appropriating the Supplies granted in this Session of Parliament.
- Citation: 59 Geo. 3. c. 133
- Territorial extent: United Kingdom

Dates
- Royal assent: 13 July 1819
- Commencement: 13 July 1819
- Repealed: 5 August 1873
Other legislation
Repealed by	Statute Law Revision Act 1873

Status: Repealed

Text of statute as originally enacted

- The Appropriation Act 1819 (59 Geo. 3. c. 133)

==== 1840s ====
Appropriation Act 1842
- Act of Parliament
- Parliament of the United Kingdom
- Long title: An Act to apply a Sum out of the Consolidated Fund, and certain other Sums, to the Service of the Year One thousand eight hundred and forty-two, and to appropriate the Supplies granted in this Session of Parliament.
- Citation: 5 & 6 Vict. c. 121
- Territorial extent: United Kingdom

Dates
- Royal assent: 12 August 1842
- Commencement: 12 August 1842
- Repealed: 7 August 1874
Other legislation
Repealed by	Statute Law Revision Act 1874 (No. 2)

Status: Repealed

Text of statute as originally enacted

- The Appropriation Act 1842 (5 & 6 Vict. c. 121)

==== 1850s ====
Appropriation Act 1850
- Act of Parliament
- Parliament of the United Kingdom
- Long title: An Act to apply a Sum out of the Consolidated Fund, and certain other Sums, to the Service of the Year One thousand eight hundred and fifty; and to appropriate the Supplies granted in this Session of Parliament.
- Citation: 13 & 14 Vict. c. 107
- Territorial extent: United Kingdom

Dates
- Royal assent: 15 August 1850
- Commencement: 15 August 1850
- Repealed: 11 August 1875
Other legislation
Repealed by	Statute Law Revision Act 1875

Status: Repealed

Text of statute as originally enacted

- The Appropriation Act 1850

Appropriation Act 1851
- Act of Parliament
- Parliament of the United Kingdom
- Long title: An Act to apply a Sum out of the Consolidated Fund, and certain other Sums, to the Service of the Year One thousand eight hundred and fifty-one; and to appropriate the Supplies granted in this Session of Parliament.
- Citation: 14 & 15 Vict. c. 101
- Territorial extent: United Kingdom

Dates
- Royal assent: 8 August 1851
- Commencement: 8 August 1851
- Repealed: 11 August 1875
Other legislation
Repealed by	Statute Law Revision Act 1875

Status: Repealed

Text of statute as originally enacted

- The Appropriation Act 1851

Appropriation Act 1852
- Act of Parliament
- Parliament of the United Kingdom
- Long title: An Act to apply a Sum out of the Consolidated Fund, and certain other Sums, to the Service of the Year One thousand eight hundred and fifty-two, and to appropriate the Supplies granted in this Session of Parliament.
- Citation: 15 & 16 Vict. c. 82
- Territorial extent: United Kingdom

Dates
- Royal assent: 1 July 1852
- Commencement: 1 July 1852
- Repealed: 11 August 1875
Other legislation
Repealed by	Statute Law Revision Act 1875

Status: Repealed

Text of statute as originally enacted

- The Appropriation Act 1852

Appropriation Act 1853
- Act of Parliament
- Parliament of the United Kingdom
- Long title: An Act to apply a Sum out of the Consolidated Fund and the Surplus of Ways and Moans to the Service of the Year One thousand eight hundred and fifty-three, and to appropriate the Supplies granted in this Session of Parliament.
- Citation: 16 & 17 Vict. c. 110
- Territorial extent: United Kingdom

Dates
- Royal assent: 20 August 1852
- Commencement: 20 August 1852
- Repealed: 11 August 1875
Other legislation
Repealed by	Statute Law Revision Act 1875

Status: Repealed

Text of statute as originally enacted

- The Appropriation Act 1853

Appropriation Act 1854
- Act of Parliament
- Parliament of the United Kingdom
- Long title: An Act to apply a Sum out of the Consolidated Fund and certain other Sums to the Service of the Year One thousand eight hundred and fifty-four, and to appropriate the Supplies granted in this Session of Parliament.
- Citation: 17 & 18 Vict. c. 121
- Territorial extent: United Kingdom

Dates
- Royal assent: 12 August 1854
- Commencement: 12 August 1854
- Repealed: 11 August 1875
Other legislation
Repealed by	Statute Law Revision Act 1875

Status: Repealed

Text of statute as originally enacted

- The Appropriation Act 1854

Appropriation Act 1855
- Act of Parliament
- Parliament of the United Kingdom
- Long title: An Act to apply a Sum out of the Consolidated Fund and the Surplus of Ways and Means to the Service of the Year One thousand eight hundred and fifty-five, and to appropriate the Supplies granted in this Session of Parliament.
- Citation: 18 & 19 Vict. c. 129
- Territorial extent: United Kingdom

Dates
- Royal assent: 14 August 1855
- Commencement: 14 August 1855
- Repealed: 11 August 1875
Other legislation
Repealed by	Statute Law Revision Act 1875

Status: Repealed

Text of statute as originally enacted

- The Appropriation Act 1855

Appropriation Act 1856
- Act of Parliament
- Parliament of the United Kingdom
- Long title: An Act to apply a Sum out of the Consolidated Fund and the Surplus of Ways and Means to the Service of the Year One thousand eight hundred and fifty-six, and to appropriate the Supplies granted in this Session of Parliament.
- Citation: 19 & 20 Vict. c. 105
- Territorial extent: United Kingdom

Dates
- Royal assent: 29 July 1856
- Commencement: 29 July 1856
- Repealed: 11 August 1875
Other legislation
Repealed by	Statute Law Revision Act 1875

Status: Repealed

Text of statute as originally enacted

- The Appropriation Act 1856

Appropriation Act 1857
- Act of Parliament
- Parliament of the United Kingdom
- Long title: An Act to apply a Sum out of the Consolidated Fund to the Service of the Year One thousand eight hundred and fifty-seven, and to appropriate the Supplies granted in this Session of Parliament.
- Citation: 20 Vict. c. 20
- Territorial extent: United Kingdom

Dates
- Royal assent: 21 March 1857
- Commencement: 21 March 1857
- Repealed: 11 August 1875
Other legislation
Repealed by	Statute Law Revision Act 1875

Status: Repealed

Text of statute as originally enacted

Appropriation Act 1857
- Act of Parliament
- Parliament of the United Kingdom
- Long title: An Act to apply a Sum out of the Consolidated Fund and the Surplus of Ways and Means to the Service of the Year One thousand eight hundred and fifty-seven, and to appropriate the Supplies granted in this Session of Parliament.
- Citation: 20 & 21 Vict. c. 69
- Territorial extent: United Kingdom

Dates
- Royal assent: 25 August 1857
- Commencement: 25 August 1857
- Repealed: 11 August 1875
Other legislation
Repealed by	Statute Law Revision Act 1875

Status: Repealed

Text of statute as originally enacted

- The Appropriation Act 1857

Appropriation Act 1858
- Act of Parliament
- Parliament of the United Kingdom
- Long title: An Act to Apply a Sum out of the Consolidated Fund and the Surplus of Ways and Means to the Service of the Year One thousand eight hundred and fifty-eight, and to appropriate the Supplies granted in this Session of Parliament.
- Citation: 21 & 22 Vict. c. 107
- Territorial extent: United Kingdom

Dates
- Royal assent: 2 August 1858
- Commencement: 2 August 1858
- Repealed: 11 August 1875
Other legislation
Repealed by	Statute Law Revision Act 1875

Status: Repealed

Text of statute as originally enacted

- The Appropriation Act 1858

Appropriation Act 1859
- Act of Parliament
- Parliament of the United Kingdom
- Long title: An Act to apply a Sum out of the Consolidated Fund to the Service of the Year One thousand eight hundred and fifty-nine, and to appropriate the Supplies granted in this Session of Parliament.
- Citation: 22 Vict. c. 23
- Territorial extent: United Kingdom

Dates
- Royal assent: 19 April 1859
- Commencement: 19 April 1859
- Repealed: 11 August 1875
Other legislation
Repealed by	Statute Law Revision Act 1875

Status: Repealed

Text of statute as originally enacted

- The Appropriation Act 1859

Appropriation (No. 2) Act 1859
- Act of Parliament
- Parliament of the United Kingdom
- Long title: An Act to apply a Sum out of the Consolidated Fund and the Surplus of Ways and Means to the Service of the Year One thousand eight hundred and fifty-nine; and to appropriate the Supplies granted in this Session of Parliament.
- Citation: 22 & 23 Vict. c. 55
- Territorial extent: United Kingdom

Dates
- Royal assent: 13 August 1859
- Commencement: 13 August 1859
- Repealed: 11 August 1875
Other legislation
Repealed by	Statute Law Revision Act 1875

Status: Repealed

Text of statute as originally enacted

- The Appropriation (No. 2) Act 1859

==== 1860s ====
Appropriation Act 1860
- Act of Parliament
- Parliament of the United Kingdom
- Long title: An Act to apply a Sum out of the Consolidated Fund and the Surplus of Ways and Means to the Service of the Year One thousand eight hundred and sixty, and to appropriate the Supplies granted in this Session of Parliament.
- Citation: 23 & 24 Vict. c. 131
- Territorial extent: United Kingdom

Dates
- Royal assent: 28 August 1860
- Commencement: 28 August 1860
- Repealed: 11 August 1875
Other legislation
Repealed by	Statute Law Revision Act 1875

Status: Repealed

Text of statute as originally enacted

- The Appropriation Act 1860 (23 & 24 Vict. c. 131)

Appropriation Act 1861
- Act of Parliament
- Parliament of the United Kingdom
- Long title: An Act to apply a Sum out of the Consolidated Fund and the Surplus of Ways and Means to the Service of the Year One thousand eight hundred and sixty-one, and to appropriate the Supplies granted in this Session of Parliament.
- Citation: 24 & 25 Vict. c. 103
- Territorial extent: United Kingdom

Dates
- Royal assent: 6 August 1861
- Commencement: 6 August 1861
- Repealed: 11 August 1875
Other legislation
Repealed by	Statute Law Revision Act 1875

Status: Repealed

Text of statute as originally enacted

- The Appropriation Act 1861 (24 & 25 Vict. c. 103)

Appropriation Act 1862
- Act of Parliament
- Parliament of the United Kingdom
- Long title: An Act to apply a Sum out of the Consolidated Fund and the Surplus of Ways and Means to the Service of the Year One thousand eight hundred and sixty-two, and to appropriate the Supplies granted in this Session of Parliament.
- Citation: 25 & 26 Vict. c. 71
- Territorial extent: United Kingdom

Dates
- Royal assent: 7 August 1862
- Commencement: 7 August 1862
- Repealed: 11 August 1875
Other legislation
Repealed by	Statute Law Revision Act 1875

Status: Repealed

Text of statute as originally enacted

- The Appropriation Act 1862 (25 & 26 Vict. c. 71)

Appropriation Act 1863
- Act of Parliament
- Parliament of the United Kingdom
- Long title: An Act to apply a Sum out of the Consolidated Fund and the Surplus of Ways and Means to the Service of the Year One thousand eight hundred and sixty-three, and to appropriate the Supplies granted in this Session of Parliament.
- Citation: 26 & 27 Vict. c. 99
- Territorial extent: United Kingdom

Dates
- Royal assent: 28 July 1863
- Commencement: 28 July 1863
- Repealed: 11 August 1875
Other legislation
Repealed by	Statute Law Revision Act 1875

Status: Repealed

Text of statute as originally enacted

- The Appropriation Act 1863 (26 & 27 Vict. c. 99)

Consolidated Fund (Appropriation) Act 1864
- Act of Parliament
- Parliament of the United Kingdom
- Long title: An Act to apply a Sum out of the Consolidated Fund and the Surplus of Ways and Means to the Service of the Year One thousand eight hundred and sixty-four, and to appropriate the Supplies granted in this Session of Parliament.
- Citation: 27 & 28 Vict. c. 73
- Territorial extent: United Kingdom

Dates
- Royal assent: 29 July 1864
- Commencement: 29 July 1864
- Repealed: 11 August 1875
Other legislation
Repealed by	Statute Law Revision Act 1875

Status: Repealed

Text of statute as originally enacted

- The Consolidated Fund (Appropriation) Act (1864) (27 & 28 Vict. c. 73). The bill for this act was the Consolidated Fund (Appropriation) Bill. This act received royal assent on 29 July 1864.

Appropriation Act 1865
- Act of Parliament
- Parliament of the United Kingdom
- Long title: An Act to apply a Sum out of the Consolidated Fund and the Surplus of Ways and Means to the Service of the Year ending Thirty-first March One thousand eight hundred and sixty-six, and to appropriate the Supplies granted in this Session of Parliament.
- Citation: 28 & 29 Vict. c. 123
- Territorial extent: United Kingdom

Dates
- Royal assent: 6 July 1865
- Commencement: 6 July 1865
- Repealed: 11 August 1875
Other legislation
Repealed by	Statute Law Revision Act 1875

Status: Repealed

Text of statute as originally enacted

- The Appropriation Act 1865 (28 & 29 Vict. c. 123)

Appropriation Act 1866
- Act of Parliament
- Parliament of the United Kingdom
- Long title: An Act to apply a Sum out of the Consolidated Fund and the Surplus of Ways and Means to the Service of the Year ending Thirty-first March One thousand eight hundred and sixty-seven, and to appropriate the Supplies granted in this Session of Parliament.
- Citation: 29 & 30 Vict. c. 91
- Territorial extent: United Kingdom

Dates
- Royal assent: 10 August 1866
- Commencement: 10 August 1866
- Repealed: 11 August 1875
Other legislation
Repealed by	Statute Law Revision Act 1875

Status: Repealed

Text of statute as originally enacted

- The Appropriation Act 1866 (29 & 30 Vict. c. 91)

Appropriation Act 1867
- Act of Parliament
- Parliament of the United Kingdom
- Long title: An Act to apply a Sum out of the Consolidated Fund and the Surplus of Ways and Means to the Service of the Year ending the Thirty-first Day of March One thousand eight hundred and sixty-eight, and to appropriate the Supplies granted in this Session of Parliament.
- Citation: 30 & 31 Vict. c. 120
- Territorial extent: United Kingdom

Dates
- Royal assent: 20 August 1867
- Commencement: 20 August 1867
- Repealed: 11 August 1875
Other legislation
Repealed by	Statute Law Revision Act 1875

Status: Repealed

Text of statute as originally enacted

- The Appropriation Act 1867 (30 & 31 Vict. c. 120)

Appropriation Act 1868
- Act of Parliament
- Parliament of the United Kingdom
- Long title: An Act to apply a Sum out of the Consolidated Fund and the Surplus of Ways and Means to the Service of the Year ending the Thirty-first Day of March One thousand eight hundred and sixty-nine, and to appropriate the Supplies granted in this Session of Parliament.
- Citation: 31 & 32 Vict. c. 85
- Territorial extent: United Kingdom

Dates
- Royal assent: 31 July 1868
- Commencement: 31 July 1868
- Repealed: 11 August 1875
Other legislation
Repealed by	Statute Law Revision Act 1875

Status: Repealed

Text of statute as originally enacted

- The Appropriation Act 1868 (31 & 32 Vict. c. 85)

Appropriation Act 1869
- Act of Parliament
- Parliament of the United Kingdom
- Long title: An Act to apply a sum out of the Consolidated Fund and the Surplus of Ways and Means to the service of the year ending the thirty-first day of March one thousand eight hundred and seventy, and to appropriate the Supplies granted in this Session of Parliament.
- Citation: 32 & 33 Vict. c. 93
- Territorial extent: United Kingdom

Dates
- Royal assent: 11 August 1869
- Commencement: 11 August 1869
- Repealed: 25 August 1833
Other legislation
Repealed by	Statute Law Revision Act 1883

Status: Repealed

Text of statute as originally enacted

- The Appropriation Act 1869 (32 & 33 Vict. c. 93)

==== 1870s ====
Appropriation Act 1870 (Note: Section 8.)
- Act of Parliament
- Parliament of the United Kingdom
- Long title: An Act to apply a sum out of the Consolidated Fund to the service of the year ending the thirty-first day of March one thousand eight hundred and seventy-one, and to appropriate the Supplies granted in this Session of Parliament.
- Citation: 33 & 34 Vict. c. 96
- Territorial extent: United Kingdom

Dates
- Royal assent: 10 August 1870
- Commencement: 10 August 1870
- Repealed: Statute Law Revision Act 1883; Territorial Army and Militia Act 1921
Other legislation
Repealed by	Statute Law Revision Act 1966

Status: Repealed

Text of statute as originally enacted

- The Appropriation Act 1870 (33 & 34 Vict. c. 96). This act received royal assent on 10 August 1870. Section 7 was amended by section 6 of the Appropriation Act 1872, and repealed by section 6 of the Appropriation Act 1877. The Appropriation Act 1870, except sections 6 and 8, was repealed by the Statute Law Revision Act 1883. The words "militia, yeomanry" in section 6 were repealed by the Territorial Army and Militia Act 1921. The whole Act was repealed for the United Kingdom by the Schedule to the Statute Law Revision Act 1966, and for the Republic of Ireland by Part 4 of the Schedule to the Statute Law Revision Act 1983.

Appropriation Act 1871 (Note: Section 6.)
- Act of Parliament
- Parliament of the United Kingdom
- Long title: An Act to apply a sum out of the Consolidated Fund to the service of the year ending the thirty-first day of March one thousand eight hundred and seventy-two, and to appropriate the Supplies granted in this Session of Parliament.
- Citation: 34 & 35 Vict. c. 89
- Territorial extent: United Kingdom

Dates
- Royal assent: 21 August 1871
- Commencement: 21 August 1871
- Repealed: 25 August 1883
Other legislation
Repealed by	Statute Law Revision Act 1883

Status: Repealed

Text of statute as originally enacted

- The Appropriation Act 1871 (34 & 35 Vict. c. 89). This act received royal assent on 21 August 1871, and was repealed by the Statute Law Revision Act 1883.

Appropriation Act 1872 (Note: Section 7.)
- Act of Parliament
- Parliament of the United Kingdom
- Long title: An Act to apply a sum out of the Consolidated Fund to the service of the year ending the thirty-first day of March one thousand eight hundred and seventy-three, and to appropriate the Supplies granted in this Session of Parliament.
- Citation: 35 & 36 Vict. c. 87
- Territorial extent: United Kingdom

Dates
- Royal assent: 10 August 1872
- Commencement: 10 August 1872
- Repealed: 25 August 1883
Other legislation
Repealed by	Statute Law Revision Act 1883

Status: Repealed

Text of statute as originally enacted

- The Appropriation Act 1872 (35 & 36 Vict. c. 87). This act received royal assent on 10 August 1872. Section 6 was repealed by section 6 of the Appropriation Act 1877. The Appropriation Act 1872 was repealed by the Statute Law Revision Act 1883.

Appropriation Act 1873
- Act of Parliament
- Parliament of the United Kingdom
- Long title: An Act to apply a sum out of the Consolidated Fund to the service of the year ending the thirty-first day of March one thousand eight hundred and seventy-four, and to appropriate the Supplies granted in this Session of Parliament.
- Citation: 36 & 37 Vict. c. 79
- Territorial extent: United Kingdom

Dates
- Royal assent: 5 August 1873
- Commencement: 5 August 1873
- Repealed: 25 August 1883
Other legislation
Repealed by	Statute Law Revision Act 1883

Status: Repealed

Text of statute as originally enacted

- The Appropriation Act 1873 (36 & 37 Vict. c. 79). This act received royal assent on 5 August 1873, and was repealed by the Statute Law Revision Act 1883.

Appropriation Act 1874
- Act of Parliament
- Parliament of the United Kingdom
- Long title: An Act to apply a sum out of the Consolidated Fund to the service of the year ending the thirty-first day of March one thousand eight hundred and seventy-five, and to appropriate the Supplies granted in this Session of Parliament.
- Citation: 37 & 38 Vict. c. 56
- Territorial extent: United Kingdom

Dates
- Royal assent: 7 August 1874
- Commencement: 7 August 1874
- Repealed: 25 August 1883
Other legislation
Repealed by	Statute Law Revision Act 1883

Status: Repealed

Text of statute as originally enacted

- The Appropriation Act 1874 (37 & 38 Vict. c. 56). This act received royal assent on 7 August 1874, and was repealed by the Statute Law Revision Act 1883.

Appropriation Act 1875
- Act of Parliament
- Parliament of the United Kingdom
- Long title: An Act to apply a sum out of the Consolidated Fund to the service of the year ending the thirty-first day of March one thousand eight hundred and seventy-six, and to appropriate the Supplies granted in this Session of Parliament.
- Citation: 38 & 39 Vict. c. 78
- Territorial extent: United Kingdom

Dates
- Royal assent: 13 August 1875
- Commencement: 13 August 1875
- Repealed: 25 August 1883
Other legislation
Repealed by	Statute Law Revision Act 1883

Status: Repealed

Text of statute as originally enacted

- The Appropriation Act 1875 (38 & 39 Vict. c. 78). This act received royal assent on 13 August 1875, and was repealed by the Statute Law Revision Act 1883.

Appropriation Act 1876
- Act of Parliament
- Parliament of the United Kingdom
- Long title: An Act to apply a sum out of the Consolidated Fund to the service of the year ending the thirty-first day of March one thousand eight hundred and seventy-seven, and to appropriate the Supplies granted in this Session of Parliament.
- Citation: 39 & 40 Vict. c. 60
- Territorial extent: United Kingdom

Dates
- Royal assent: 15 August 1876
- Commencement: 15 August 1876
- Repealed: 25 August 1883
Other legislation
Repealed by	Statute Law Revision Act 1883

Status: Repealed

Text of statute as originally enacted

- The Appropriation Act 1876 (39 & 40 Vict. c. 60). This act received royal assent on 15 August 1876, and was repealed by the Statute Law Revision Act 1883.

Appropriation Act 1877
- Act of Parliament
- Parliament of the United Kingdom
- Long title: An Act to apply a sum out of the Consolidated Fund to the service of the year ending the thirty-first day of March one thousand eight hundred and seventy-eight, and to appropriate the Supplies granted in this Session of Parliament.
- Citation: 40 & 41 Vict. c. 61
- Territorial extent: United Kingdom

Dates
- Royal assent: 14 August 1877
- Commencement: 14 August 1877
- Repealed: 25 August 1883
Other legislation
Repealed by	Statute Law Revision Act 1883

Status: Repealed

Text of statute as originally enacted

- The Appropriation Act 1877 (40 & 41 Vict. c. 61). This act received royal assent on 14 August 1877, and was repealed by the Statute Law Revision Act 1883.

Appropriation Act 1878
- Act of Parliament
- Parliament of the United Kingdom
- Long title: An Act to apply a sum out of the Consolidated Fund to the service of the year ending the thirty-first day of March one thousand eight hundred and seventy-nine, and to appropriate the Supplies granted in this Session of Parliament.
- Citation: 41 & 42 Vict. c. 65
- Territorial extent: United Kingdom

Dates
- Royal assent: 16 August 1878
- Commencement: 16 August 1878
- Repealed: 25 August 1883
Other legislation
Repealed by	Statute Law Revision Act 1883

Status: Repealed

Text of statute as originally enacted

- The Appropriation Act 1878 (41 & 42 Vict. c. 65). This act received royal assent on 16 August 1878, and was repealed by the Statute Law Revision Act 1883.

Appropriation Act 1879
- Act of Parliament
- Parliament of the United Kingdom
- Long title: An Act to apply a sum out of the Consolidated Fund to the service of the year ending the thirty-first day of March one thousand eight hundred and eighty, and to appropriate the Supplies granted in this Session of Parliament.
- Citation: 42 & 43 Vict. c. 51
- Territorial extent: United Kingdom

Dates
- Royal assent: 15 August 1879
- Commencement: 15 August 1879
- Repealed: 25 August 1894
Other legislation
Repealed by	Statute Law Revision Act 1894

Status: Repealed

Text of statute as originally enacted

- The Appropriation Act 1879 (42 & 43 Vict. c. 51). This act received royal assent on 15 August 1879, and was repealed by the First Schedule to the Statute Law Revision Act 1894.

==== 1880s ====
Appropriation Act 1880
- Act of Parliament
- Parliament of the United Kingdom
- Long title: An Act to apply certain sums out of the Consolidated Fund to the service of the years ending on the thirty-first day of March one thousand eight hundred and seventy-nine, one thousand eight hundred and eighty, and one thou sand eight hundred and eighty-one, and to appropriate the Supplies granted in this Session of Parliament.
- Citation: 43 Vict. c. 13
- Territorial extent: United Kingdom

Dates
- Royal assent: 24 March 1880
- Commencement: 24 March 1880
- Repealed: 25 August 1894
Other legislation
Repealed by	Statute Law Revision Act 1894

Status: Repealed

Text of statute as originally enacted

- The Appropriation Act 1880 (43 Vict. c. 13). This act received royal assent on 24 March 1880, and was repealed by the First Schedule to the Statute Law Revision Act 1894.

Appropriation Act 1880 (Session 2)
- Act of Parliament
- Parliament of the United Kingdom
- Long title: An Act to apply a sum out of the Consolidated Fund to the service of the year ending on the thirty-first day of March one thousand eight hundred and eighty-one, and to appropriate the Supplies granted in this Session of Parliament.
- Citation: 43 & 44 Vict. c. 40
- Territorial extent: United Kingdom

Dates
- Royal assent: 7 September 1880
- Commencement: 7 September 1880
- Repealed: 25 August 1894
Other legislation
Repealed by	Statute Law Revision Act 1894

Status: Repealed

Text of statute as originally enacted

- The Appropriation Act 1880 (Session 2) (43 & 44 Vict. c. 40). This act received royal assent on 7 September 1880, and was repealed by the First Schedule to the Statute Law Revision Act 1894.

Appropriation Act 1881
- Act of Parliament
- Parliament of the United Kingdom
- Long title: An Act to apply a sum out of the Consolidated Fund to the Service of the year ending on the thirty-first day of March one thousand eight hundred and eighty-two, and to appropriate the Supplies granted in this Session of Parliament.
- Citation: 44 & 45 Vict. c. 56
- Territorial extent: United Kingdom

Dates
- Royal assent: 27 August 1881
- Commencement: 27 August 1881
- Repealed: 25 August 1894
Other legislation
Repealed by	Statute Law Revision Act 1894

Status: Repealed

Text of statute as originally enacted

- The Appropriation Act 1881 (44 & 45 Vict. c. 56). This act received royal assent on 27 August 1881, and was repealed by the First Schedule to the Statute Law Revision Act 1894.

Appropriation Act 1882
- Act of Parliament
- Parliament of the United Kingdom
- Long title: An Act to apply a sum out of the Consolidated Fund to the service of the year ending on the thirty-first day of March one thousand eight hundred and eighty-three, and to appropriate the Supplies granted in this Session of Parliament.
- Citation: 45 & 46 Vict. c. 71
- Territorial extent: United Kingdom

Dates
- Royal assent: 18 August 1882
- Commencement: 18 August 1882
- Repealed: 25 July 1898
Other legislation
Repealed by	Statute Law Revision Act 1898

Status: Repealed

Text of statute as originally enacted

- The Appropriation Act 1882 (45 & 46 Vict. c. 71). This act received royal assent on 18 August 1882.

Appropriation Act 1883
- Act of Parliament
- Parliament of the United Kingdom
- Long title: An Act to apply a sum out of the Consolidated Fund to the service of the year ending on the thirty-first day of March one thousand eight hundred and eighty-four, and to appropriate the Supplies granted in this Session of Parliament.
- Citation: 46 & 47 Vict. c. 50
- Territorial extent: United Kingdom

Dates
- Royal assent: 25 August 1883
- Commencement: 25 August 1883
- Repealed: 25 July 1898
Other legislation
Repealed by	Statute Law Revision Act 1898

Status: Repealed

Text of statute as originally enacted

- The Appropriation Act 1883 (46 & 47 Vict. c. 50). This act received royal assent on 25 August 1883.

=== 21st century ===
==== 2010s ====
Appropriation Act 2010 (Note: Section 5.)
- Act of Parliament
- Parliament of the United Kingdom
- Long title: An Act to authorise the use of resources for the service of the years ending with 31 March 2009 and 31 March 2010 and to apply certain sums out of the Consolidated Fund to the service of the year ending with 31 March 2010; and to appropriate the supply authorised in this Session of Parliament for the service of the years ending with 31 March 2009 and 31 March 2010.
- Citation: 2010 c. 5
- Territorial extent: United Kingdom

Dates
- Royal assent: 18 March 2010
- Commencement: 18 March 2010 (Note: Section 4(b) of the Interpretation Act 1978.)

Status: Spent

Text of statute as originally enacted

Revised text of statute as amended

- The Appropriation Act 2010 (c. 5)

Appropriation Act 2011
- Act of Parliament
- Parliament of the United Kingdom
- Long title: An Act to authorise the use of resources for the service of the years ending with 31 March 2010 and 31 March 2011 and to apply certain sums out of the Consolidated Fund to the service of the years ending with 31 March 2010 and 31 March 2011; and to appropriate the supply authorised in this Session of Parliament for the service of the years ending with 31 March 2010 and 31 March 2011.
- Citation: 2011 c. 2
- Territorial extent: United Kingdom

Dates
- Royal assent: 16 March 2011
- Commencement: 16 March 2011

Status: Spent

Text of statute as originally enacted

- The Appropriation Act 2011 (c. 2)

Supply and Appropriation (Anticipation and Adjustments) Act 2012
- Act of Parliament
- Parliament of the United Kingdom
- Long title: An Act to authorise the use of resources for the years ending with 31 March 2012 and 31 March 2013; to authorise the issue of sums out of the Consolidated Fund for those years and for the year ending with 31 March 2011; and to appropriate the supply authorised by this Act for the years ending with 31 March 2011 and 31 March 2012.
- Citation: 2012 c. 1
- Territorial extent: United Kingdom

Dates
- Royal assent: 8 March 2012
- Commencement: 8 March 2012

Status: Spent

Text of statute as originally enacted

Revised text of statute as amended

- The Supply and Appropriation (Anticipation and Adjustments) Act 2012 (c. 1)

Supply and Appropriation (Main Estimates) Act 2012
- Act of Parliament
- Parliament of the United Kingdom
- Long title: An Act to authorise the use of resources for the year ending with 31 March 2013; to authorise both the issue of sums out of the Consolidated Fund and the application of income for that year; and to appropriate the supply authorised for that year by this Act and by the Supply and Appropriation (Anticipation and Adjustments) Act 2012.
- Citation: 2012 c. 13
- Territorial extent: United Kingdom

Dates
- Royal assent: 17 July 2012
- Commencement: 17 July 2012

Status: Spent

Text of statute as originally enacted

Revised text of statute as amended

- The Supply and Appropriation (Main Estimates) Act 2012 (c. 13)

== Northern Ireland ==
A number of Appropriation Acts were passed by the Parliament of Northern Ireland. A number of Appropriation Orders in Council have been made for Northern Ireland.

== See also ==
- List of short titles
- Appropriations bill (United States)

== Bibliography ==
- Bradley, A. W.; Ewing, K. D. (2003). Constitutional and Administrative Law (13th ed.). London: Pearson. pp. 202–203. ISBN 0582438071.
