= Provisional Collection of Taxes Act 1968 =

Act of the Parliament of the United Kingdom

Provisional Collection of Taxes Act 1968 (Note: Section 6(1).)
- Act of Parliament
- Parliament of the United Kingdom
- Long title: An Act to consolidate the Provisional Collection of Taxes Act 1913 and certain other enactments relating to the provisional collection of taxes or matters connected therewith.
- Citation: 1968 c. 2
- Territorial extent: United Kingdom

Dates
- Royal assent: 1 February 1968
- Commencement: 1 February 1968 (Note: The Acts of Parliament (Commencement) Act 1793.)

Other legislation
- Amends: See § Repealed enactments
- Repeals/revokes: See § Repealed enactments
- Amended by: Finance Act 1968; Finance Act 1972; Northern Ireland Constitution Act 1973; Oil Taxation Act 1975; Customs and Excise Management Act 1979; Car Tax Act 1983; Value Added Tax Act 1983; Income and Corporation Taxes Act 1988; Finance Act 1993; Finance Act 1994; Finance Act 1998; Finance Act 2000; Finance Act 2001; Finance Act 2003; Finance Act 2007; Finance Act 2011; Statute Law (Repeals) Act 2013; Finance Act 2014; Finance Act 2015; Finance Act 2016; Finance Act 2017; Finance Act 2020; Finance Act 2021; Finance (No. 2) Act 2023; Finance Act 2026

Status: Amended

Text of statute as originally enacted

Revised text of statute as amended

Text of the Provisional Collection of Taxes Act 1968 as in force today (including any amendments) within the United Kingdom, from legislation.gov.uk.

The Provisional Collection of Taxes Act 1968 (c. 2) is an act of the Parliament of the United Kingdom that consolidated enactments relating to the provisional collection of taxes in the United Kingdom.

== Provisions ==
=== Repealed enactments ===
Section 6(2) of the act repealed 4 enactments, listed in the schedule to the act.

Enactments repealed by section 6(2)
Citation	Short title	Extent of repeal
3 & 4 Geo. 5. c. 3	Provisional Collection of Taxes Act 1913	The whole act.
15 & 16 Geo. 6 & 1 Eliz. 2. c. 44	Customs and Excise Act 1952	Sections 265 and 269.
5 & 6 Eliz. 2. c. 49	Finance Act 1957	Section 9.
1967 c. 54	Finance Act 1967	Sections 41, except subsection (5), and 42.
1967 c. 54	Finance Act 1967	In Schedule 16, Part IX.
