= Tobacco Products Duty Act 1979 =

Act of the Parliament of the United Kingdom

Tobacco Products Duty Act 1979 (Note: Section 12(1).)
- Act of Parliament
- Parliament of the United Kingdom
- Long title: An Act to consolidate the enactments relating to the excise duty on tobacco products.
- Citation: 1979 c. 7
- Territorial extent: United Kingdom

Dates
- Royal assent: 22 February 1979
- Commencement: 1 April 1979 (Note: Section 12(2).)

Other legislation
- Amends: See § Repealed enactments
- Repeals/revokes: See § Repealed enactments
- Amended by: Finance Act 1994; Finance Act 1995; Finance Act 1996; Finance Act 1997; Finance (No. 2) Act 1997; Finance Act 1998; Finance Act 1999; Scotland Act 1998 (Consequential Modifications) (No.2) Order 1999; Finance Act 2002; Finance Act 2003; Tobacco Products (Descriptions of Products) Order 2003; Finance Act 2004; Constitutional Reform Act 2005; Finance Act 2005; Finance Act 2006; Finance Act 2007; Finance Act 2008; Companies Act 2006 (Consequential Amendments) (Taxes and National Insurance) Order 2008; Alcoholic Liquor Duties (Surcharges) and Tobacco Products Duty Order 2008; Finance Act 2009; Transfer of Tribunal Functions and Revenue and Customs Appeals Order 2009; Finance Act 2010; Finance (No. 3) Act 2010; Finance Act 2011; Finance Act 2012; Finance Act 2013; Finance Act 2014; Finance Act 2015; Finance Act 2016; Finance Act 2017; Finance (No. 2) Act 2017; Finance Act 2018; Taxation (Cross-border Trade) Act 2018; Finance Act 2019; Finance Act 2020; Tobacco Products Duty (Alteration of Rates) Order 2020; Finance Act 2021; Finance Act 2022; Finance (No. 2) Act 2023; Finance Act 2024; Finance Act 2025; Finance Act 2026
- Relates to: Customs and Excise Management Act 1979; Customs and Excise Duties (General Reliefs) Act 1979; Alcoholic Liquor Duties Act 1979; Hydrocarbon Oil Duties Act 1979; Matches and Mechanical Lighters Duties Act 1979; Excise Duties (Surcharges or Rebates) Act 1979

Status: Amended

Text of statute as originally enacted

Revised text of statute as amended

Text of the Tobacco Products Duty Act 1979 as in force today (including any amendments) within the United Kingdom, from legislation.gov.uk.

The Tobacco Products Duty Act 1979 (c. 7) is an act of the Parliament of the United Kingdom that consolidated enactments relating to the excise duty on tobacco products in the United Kingdom.

== Provisions ==
=== Repealed enactments ===
Section 11(1) of the act repealed 4 enactments, listed in schedule 2 to the act.

Enactments repealed by section 11(1)
Citation	Short title	Extent of repeal
15 & 16 Geo. 6 & 1 Eliz. 2. c. 44	Customs and Excise Act 1952	In the proviso to section 271(3), paragraph (i). (Note: The repeal does not affect drawback by virtue of events occurring on or before 30 June 1978.)
1976 c. 40	Finance Act 1976	Sections 4, 5, 6(1) to (5) and 7.
1977 c. 36	Finance Act 1977	Sections 2(2) and (4) to (8) and 3(1) and (5).
1978 c. 42	Finance Act 1978	Section 1.
1978 c. 42	Finance Act 1978	In Schedule 12, paragraph 7(2).
