= Vehicle Excise and Registration Act 1994 =

Act of the Parliament of the United Kingdom

Vehicle Excise and Registration Act 1994 (Note: Section 68.)
- Act of Parliament
- Parliament of the United Kingdom
- Long title: An Act to consolidate the enactments relating to vehicle excise duty and the registration of vehicles.
- Citation: 1994 c. 22
- Territorial extent: United Kingdom (Note: Section 67.)

Dates
- Royal assent: 5 July 1994
- Commencement: 1 September 1994 (Note: Section 66(1).)

Other legislation
- Amends: Scrap Metal Dealers Act 1964; Refuse Disposal (Amenity) Act 1978; Hydrocarbon Oil Duties Act 1979; Sporting Events (Control of Alcohol etc.) Act 1985; See § Repealed enactments
- Repeals/revokes: See § Repealed enactments
- Amended by: Value Added Tax Act 1994; Wireless Telegraphy Act 2006; National Health Service (Consequential Provisions) Act 2006; Finance Act 2015; Sentencing Act 2020; Finance Act 2024

Status: Amended

Text of statute as originally enacted

Revised text of statute as amended

Text of the Vehicle Excise and Registration Act 1994 as in force today (including any amendments) within the United Kingdom, from legislation.gov.uk.

The Vehicle Excise and Registration Act 1994 (c. 22) is an act of the Parliament of the United Kingdom that consolidated enactments relating to vehicle excise duty and the registration of vehicles in the United Kingdom.

== Provisions ==
=== Repealed enactments ===
Section 65 of the act repealed 37 enactments, listed in part I of the fifth schedule to the act.

Citation	Short title	Extent of repeal
1966 c. 18	Finance Act 1966	In section 2(1), the words "(including such duty chargeable in Northern Ireland)".
1967 c. 54	Finance Act 1967	Section 45(3)(c).
1967 c. 72	Wireless Telegraphy Act 1967	Section 8(4). Section 14(2).
1968 c. 48	International Organisations Act 1968	In section 2(2)(b), the words "(that is to say," onwards.
1971 c. 10	Vehicles (Excise) Act 1971	The whole act.
1972 c. 41	Finance Act 1972	Section 55(6). Section 128(3).
1974 c. 39	Consumer Credit Act 1974	In Schedule 4, in Part I, paragraph 32.
1975 c. 45	Finance (No. 2) Act 1975	Section 5(1), (5) and (6).
1976 c. 40	Finance Act 1976	Section 11(1) to (4). Section 12.
1977 c. 36	Finance Act 1977	Section 5(1) and (5).
1978 c. 42	Finance Act 1978	Section 8(1), (4) and (5).
1979 c. 2	Customs and Excise Management Act 1979	In Schedule 4, in the Table in paragraph 12, the entries relating to the Vehicles (Excise) Act 1971.
1980 c. 43	Magistrates' Courts Act 1980	In Schedule 7, paragraph 93.
1980 c. 48	Finance Act 1980	Section 4(1) and (4) to (7).
1981 c. 35	Finance Act 1981	Section 7(1) and (5).
1982 c. 39	Finance Act 1982	Section 3(2). Section 5(1) to (4) and (7). Section 7(1) and (3). Schedule 3. In Schedule 5, Part A.
1983 c. 28	Finance Act 1983	Section 4(1) to (3), (5) and (8). In Schedule 3, in Part I, paragraphs 1 to 6 and, in Part II, paragraphs 8, 10 and 11.
1983 c. 55	Value Added Tax Act 1983	In Schedule 9, paragraph 2.
1984 c. 43	Finance Act 1984	Section 4(1) and (3) to (6). Section 5(1) to (3) and (5). In Schedule 2, in Part II, paragraph 6(1) and (2).
1984 c. 54	Roads (Scotland) Act 1984	In Schedule 9, paragraph 67.
1985 c. 54	Finance Act 1985	Section 4(1) to (3) and (5) to (8). Section 9. In Schedule 2, in Part I, paragraphs 2 and 5 and, in Part II, paragraph 8.
1986 c. 41	Finance Act 1986	Section 3(1) to (4) and (6) to (8). Schedule 1. In Schedule 2, Part I.
1987 c. 16	Finance Act 1987	In section 2, subsections (1), (3) and (5), in subsection (6) the words "The Acts of 1971 and 1972 and" and subsections (7) and (8). In Schedule 1, in Part II, paragraphs 1, 2 and 5 and, in Part III, paragraphs 7, 8, 10, 12, 14, 16 and 18.
1988 c. 39	Finance Act 1988	Section 4(1), (3)(b) to (d), (4) and (6) to (9). In Schedule 2, Part I and, in Part II, paragraphs 1, 2, 4 and 5.
1988 c. 53	Road Traffic Offenders Act 1988	Section 21(2)(e) and (f). In Schedule 3, the entries relating to the Vehicles (Excise) Act 1971.
1988 c. 54	Road Traffic (Consequential Provisions) Act 1988	In Schedule 3, paragraph 8(2)(a) to (c), (3) and (4).
1989 c. 26	Finance Act 1989	Section 6(1), (2), (5) and (7). Sections 7 to 13. Section 14(1), (3), (5) and (7). Section 16(3). In Schedule 1, Part I. In Schedule 2, paragraphs 1, 2 and 4.
1990 c. 19	National Health Service and Community Care Act 1990	In Schedule 8, paragraph 2.
1990 c. 29	Finance Act 1990	Section 5(1) to (3), (8) and (9). Section 6. In Schedule 2, Part I and, in Part II, paragraphs 1, 2, 8 and 9.
1991 c. 21	Disability Living Allowance and Disability Working Allowance Act 1991	In Schedule 2, paragraph 1.
1991 c. 31	Finance Act 1991	Section 4(1) to (3), (5) and (6). Sections 8 to 10. In Schedule 3, in Part I, paragraphs 1 to 4, 5(1)(a), (2), (4) and (5), 6 to 20, 22 and 23.
1991 c. 40	Road Traffic Act 1991	In Schedule 4, paragraphs 4 and 5.
1991 c. 53	Criminal Justice Act 1991	In Schedule 11, paragraph 9.
1992 c. 20	Finance Act 1992	Section 4(1), (2) and (5).
1992 c. 48	Finance (No. 2) Act 1992	Section 11(1), (3), (10) and (11). Sections 12 and 13. In Schedule 3, paragraph 91.
1993 c. 34	Finance Act 1993	Section 17(1), (2), (3)(b), (4), (5), (7)(a) and (8). Sections 18 and 19. Section 20(1), (2) and (4). Section 21. Section 23.
1994 c. 9	Finance Act 1994	Section 4. In Schedule 2, paragraphs 1 to 23 and 26 to 28 and, in paragraph 29, "20(2)".

=== Revoked instruments ===
Section 65 of the act also revoked 4 instruments, listed in part II of the fifth schedule to the act.

Number	Title	Extent of revocation
SI 1974/168	The National Health Service (Vehicles) Order 1974	The whole order.
SI 1974/1491	The National Health Service (Vehicles) (Scotland) Order 1974	The whole order.
SI 1981/154 (N.I.)	The Road Traffic (Northern Ireland) Order 1981	In Article 118(2), the words from "and the reference" to "1972".
SI 1991/1712 (N.I.)	The Disability Living Allowance and Disability Working Allowance (Northern Ireland) Order 1991	In Schedule 2, paragraph 1.
