= Customs and Excise Management Act 1979 =

Act of the Parliament of the United Kingdom

Customs and Excise Management Act 1979 (Note: Section 178(1).)
- Act of Parliament
- Parliament of the United Kingdom
- Long title: An Act to consolidate the enactments relating to the collection and management of the revenues of customs and excise and in some cases to other matters in relation to which the Commissioners of Customs and Excise for the time being perform functions, with amendments to give effect to recommendations of the Law Commission and the Scottish Law Commission.
- Citation: 1979 c. 2
- Territorial extent: United Kingdom

Dates
- Royal assent: 22 February 1979
- Commencement: 1 April 1979 (Note: Section 178(3).)

Other legislation
- Amends: See § Repealed enactments
- Repeals/revokes: See § Repealed enactments
- Amended by: List: Law Reform (Miscellaneous Provisions) (Scotland) Act 1980; Film Levy Finance Act 1981; Finance Act 1981; Betting and Gaming Duties Act 1981; Civil Aviation Act 1982; Car Tax Act 1983; Value Added Tax Act 1983; Public Health (Control of Disease) Act 1984; Statute Law (Repeals) Act 1986; Debtors (Scotland) Act 1987; Radioactive Substances Act 1993; Statute Law (Repeals) Act 1993; Finance Act 1994; Vehicle Excise and Registration Act 1994; Value Added Tax Act 1994; Criminal Justice and Public Order Act 1994; Finance Act 1995; Merchant Shipping Act 1995; Civil Evidence Act 1995; Criminal Procedure (Consequential Provisions) (Scotland) Act 1995; Finance Act 1996; Import of Seal Skins Regulations 1996; Finance Act 1997; Civil Evidence (Northern Ireland) Order 1997; Police (Northern Ireland) Act 1998; Finance Act 1998; Reserve Forces Act 1996 (Consequential Provisions etc.) Regulations 1998; Finance Act 1999; Youth Justice and Criminal Evidence Act 1999; Scotland Act 1998 (Consequential Modifications) (No.1) Order 1999; Scotland Act 1998 (Consequential Modifications) (No.2) Order 1999; Criminal Evidence (Northern Ireland) Order 1999; Powers of Criminal Courts (Sentencing) Act 2000; Criminal Justice and Police Act 2001; Finance Act 2002; Licensing Act 2003; Criminal Justice Act 2003; Firearms (Northern Ireland) Order 2004; Constitutional Reform Act 2005; Commissioners for Revenue and Customs Act 2005; Serious Organised Crime and Police Act 2005; Manufacture and Storage of Explosives Regulations 2005; Firearms (Amendment) (Northern Ireland) Order 2005; Immigration, Asylum and Nationality Act 2006; Finance Act 2007; Tribunals, Courts and Enforcement Act 2007; Police and Criminal Evidence (Amendment) (Northern Ireland) Order 2007; Regulatory Reform (Game) Order 2007; Criminal Justice and Immigration Act 2008; Finance Act 2008; Statute Law (Repeals) Act 2008; Consumer Protection from Unfair Trading Regulations 2008; Marine and Coastal Access Act 2009; Policing and Crime Act 2009; Transfer of Tribunal Functions and Revenue and Customs Appeals Order 2009; Aquatic Animal Health (Scotland) Regulations 2009; Aquatic Animal Health (England and Wales) Regulations 2009; Finance (No. 3) Act 2010; Excise Goods (Holding, Movement and Duty Point) Regulations 2010; Police Reform and Social Responsibility Act 2011; Treaty of Lisbon (Changes in Terminology) Order 2011; Scotland Act 2012; Finance Act 2012; Treaty of Lisbon (Changes in Terminology or Numbering) Order 2012; Enterprise and Regulatory Reform Act 2013; Finance Act 2013; Anti-social Behaviour, Crime and Policing Act 2014; Finance Act 2014; Wales Act 2014; Public Bodies (Merger of the Director of Public Prosecutions and the Director of Revenue and Customs Prosecutions) Order 2014; Explosives Regulations 2014; Air Navigation (Amendment) (No. 4) Order 2014; Legal Aid, Sentencing and Punishment of Offenders Act 2012 (Fines on Summary Conviction) Regulations 2015; Finance Act 2016; Bankruptcy (Scotland) Act 2016 (Consequential Provisions and Modifications) Order 2016; Finance Act 2018; Taxation (Cross-border Trade) Act 2018; Offensive Weapons Act 2019; European Union (Future Relationship) Act 2020; Taxation Cross-border Trade (Special Procedures Supplementary and General Provision etc.) (EU Exit) Regulations 2020; European Union Withdrawal (Consequential Modifications) (EU Exit) Regulations 2020; Finance Act 2021; Customs (Amendment) (EU Exit) Regulations 2022; Finance (No. 2) Act 2023; Finance Act 2024; Finance Act 2026; Crime and Policing Act 2026
- Relates to: Customs and Excise Duties (General Reliefs) Act 1979; Alcoholic Liquor Duties Act 1979; Hydrocarbon Oil Duties Act 1979; Matches and Mechanical Lighters Duties Act 1979; Tobacco Products Duty Act 1979; Excise Duties (Surcharges or Rebates) Act 1979

Status: Amended

Text of statute as originally enacted

Revised text of statute as amended

Text of the Customs and Excise Management Act 1979 as in force today (including any amendments) within the United Kingdom, from legislation.gov.uk.

The Customs and Excise Management Act 1979 (c. 2) is an act of the Parliament of the United Kingdom that consolidated enactments relating to the collection and management of the revenues of customs and excise in the United Kingdom. It also consolidated enactments relating to other matters in which the Commissioners of Customs and Excise performed functions, and incorporated amendments recommended by the Law Commission and the Scottish Law Commission.

== Provisions ==
=== Repealed enactments ===
Section 177(3) of the act repealed 37 enactments, listed in parts I and II of schedule 6 to the act.

Part I — Enactments of the Parliament of the United Kingdom
Citation	Short title	Extent of repeal
15 & 16 Geo. 6 & 1 Eliz. 2. c. 44	Customs and Excise Act 1952	Parts I, II, III, IX, X, XI and XII except the following provisions, that is to say—sections 35 to 37, 41 to 43, 237, 241 to 243, 263(3) to (5), in the proviso to section 271(3), paragraph (i), section 272, so much of section 307(1) as is repealed by the Alcoholic Liquor Duties Act 1979, sections 309(1), (3) and (4) and 310 and section 315(c) and (d). Schedule 7. Schedule 10, except paragraph 15.
1 & 2 Eliz. 2. c. 34	Finance Act 1953	Sections 33(1) and 35(2).
5 & 6 Eliz. 2. c. 49	Finance Act 1957	Sections 5 and 42(2)(a). Schedule 2.
6 & 7 Eliz. 2. c. 11	Isle of Man Act 1958	In section 2(1), the words from "shall not be paid" to "but".
6 & 7 Eliz. 2. c. 56	Finance Act 1958	Section 40(2)(b).
7 & 8 Eliz. 2. c. 58	Finance Act 1959	Section 37(2)(a).
8 & 9 Eliz. 2. c. 44	Finance Act 1960	In section 79, subsections (2) and (3)(a) and, in subsection (6), the words from "or any tobacco dealer's licence" onwards.
9 & 10 Eliz. 2. c. 36	Finance Act 1961	Sections 11 and 37(2).
10 & 11 Eliz. 2. c. 44	Finance Act 1962	In section 34, in subsection (2) the words from "Part I" to "1952 and".
10 & 11 Eliz. 2. c. 58	Pipe-lines Act 1962	Section 56.
1963 c. 25	Finance Act 1963	Section 7. In section 73, subsection (3) and, in subsection (4), the words from "Part I" to "1952 and".
1964 c. 49	Finance Act 1964	Sections 10(1) and 26(2) and (3).
1966 c. 18	Finance Act 1966	Sections 10 and 11. In Schedule 2, paragraph 1, except the words from "section 107(1)" to "spirits)".
1967 c. 54	Finance Act 1967	Section 3. In section 4(5), paragraph (a)(i) and (v). In section 5, in subsection (1), paragraphs (a) and (b) and subsection (2). In Schedule 6, paragraphs 5, 6, and 12. In Schedule 9, paragraph 7.
1967 c. 80	Criminal Justice Act 1967	Section 93(4). In section 106(2)(b) the words "and (4)".
1968 c. 44	Finance Act 1968	Sections 6 and 61(3).
1968 c. 59	Hovercraft Act 1968	In the Schedule, paragraph 4(c).
1969 c. 39	Age of Majority (Scotland) Act 1969	In Schedule 1, the entry relating to the Customs and Excise Act 1952.
1969 c. 46	Family Law Reform Act 1969	In Schedule 1, the entry relating to the Customs and Excise Act 1952.
1970 c. 24	Finance Act 1970	Section 5. Section 7(5) and (8). Section 36(3). In Schedule 2, paragraph 5.
1971 c. 12	Hydrocarbon Oil (Customs & Excise) Act 1971	Section 22. In Schedule 6, paragraph 1.
1971 c. 23	Courts Act 1971	In Schedule 9, the entry relating to the Customs and Excise Act 1952.
1971 c. 38	Misuse of Drugs Act 1971	Section 26.
1971 c. 68	Finance Act 1971	Section 11. In section 69(3), the words from "sections 3" to "1952". Schedule 1.
1972 c. 25	Betting and Gaming Duties Act 1972	In Schedule 2, paragraph 7. In Schedule 4, paragraph 10.
1972 c. 41	Finance Act 1972	Section 17(5). Section 55(4). Section 134(3)(a).
1972 c. 68	European Communities Act 1972	Section 5(4) and (7) to (9). In Schedule 4, paragraph 2.
1973 c. 51	Finance Act 1973	Section 2. Section 59(3)(a).
1974 c. 30	Finance Act 1974	Section 1(7) and (8). In section 57(3)(a), the words from "except so far" to "1952 and".
1975 c. 7	Finance Act 1975	Section 4.
1975 c. 45	Finance (No. 2) Act 1975	Section 1(7) and (8). Sections 8 and 16. In section 75, in subsection (2), the words from "and in Part I" onwards and subsection (3)(a). In Schedule 3, paragraphs 1, 14, 23, 39 to 41, 43 and, in paragraph 44, sub-paragraph (c). In Schedule 6, paragraphs 1 to 4.
1976 c. 40	Finance Act 1976	Section 15. Section 132(3)(a). In Schedule 3, paragraphs 2 to 4 and 6.
1977 c. 36	Finance Act 1977	Sections 8 and 9. In Schedule 6, paragraph 21.
1977 c. 45	Criminal Law Act 1977	In Schedule 5, in paragraph 1, sub-paragraphs (1)(a) and (2)(c).
1978 c. 42	Finance Act 1978	Sections 3 to 5 and 79. In Schedule 12, paragraphs 7(1), 11 to 14, 16 to 19 (except paragraph 19(7)(d)) and 21 to 24.

Part II — Enactments of the Parliament of Northern Ireland
Citation	Short title	Extent of repeal
1954 c. 8 (N.I.)	Excise (Amendment) Act (Northern Ireland) 1954	Sections 1 and 3.
1969 c. 28 (N.I.)	Age of Majority Act (Northern Ireland) 1969	In Schedule 1, the entry relating to the Customs and Excise Act 1952.
