= Hydrocarbon Oil Duties Act 1979 =

Act of the Parliament of the United Kingdom

Hydrocarbon Oil Duties Act 1979 (Note: Section 29(1).)
- Act of Parliament
- Parliament of the United Kingdom
- Long title: An Act to consolidate the enactments relating to the excise duties on hydrocarbon oil, petrol substitutes, power methylated spirits and road fuel gas.
- Citation: 1979 c. 5
- Territorial extent: United Kingdom

Dates
- Royal assent: 22 February 1979
- Commencement: 1 April 1979 (Note: Section 29(2).)

Other legislation
- Amends: See § Repealed enactments
- Repeals/revokes: See § Repealed enactments
- Amended by: Finance Act 1994; Vehicle Excise and Registration Act 1994; Finance Act 1995; Merchant Shipping Act 1995; Goods Vehicles (Licensing of Operators) Act 1995; Criminal Procedure (Consequential Provisions) (Scotland) Act 1995; Finance Act 1996; Finance Act 1997; Finance (No. 2) Act 1997; Finance Act 1998; Finance Act 1999; Finance Act 2002; Finance Act 2003; Finance Act 2004; Finance Act 2005; Finance Act 2006; Finance Act 2007; Excepted Vehicles (Amendment of Schedule 1 to the Hydrocarbon Oil Duties Act 1979) Order 2007; Finance Act 2008; Hydrocarbon Oil, Biofuels and Other Fuel Substitutes (Determination of Composition of a Substance and Miscellaneous Amendments) Regulations 2008; Finance Act 2009; Finance Act 2010; Excise Goods (Holding, Movement and Duty Point) Regulations 2010; Finance Act 2011; Finance Act 2012; Finance Act 2013; Excepted Vehicles (Amendment of Schedule 1 to the Hydrocarbon Oil Duties Act 1979) Order 2013; Legal Aid, Sentencing and Punishment of Offenders Act 2012 (Fines on Summary Conviction) Regulations 2015; Finance Act 2016; Taxation (Cross-border Trade) Act 2018; Finance Act 2020; Sentencing Act 2020; Taxation (Post-transition Period) Act 2020; Finance Act 2021; Finance Act 2022; Criminal Justice Act 2003 (Commencement No. 33) and Sentencing Act 2020 (Commencement No. 2) Regulations 2022; Finance (No. 2) Act 2023; Judicial Review and Courts Act 2022 (Magistrates' Court Sentencing Powers) Regulations 2023; Finance Act 2024
- Relates to: Customs and Excise Management Act 1979; Customs and Excise Duties (General Reliefs) Act 1979; Matches and Mechanical Lighters Duties Act 1979; Tobacco Products Duty Act 1979; Excise Duties (Surcharges or Rebates) Act 1979

Status: Amended

Text of statute as originally enacted

Revised text of statute as amended

Text of the Hydrocarbon Oil Duties Act 1979 as in force today (including any amendments) within the United Kingdom, from legislation.gov.uk.

The Hydrocarbon Oil Duties Act 1979 (c. 5) is an act of the Parliament of the United Kingdom that consolidated enactments relating to the excise duties on hydrocarbon oil, petrol substitutes, power methylated spirits and road fuel gas in the United Kingdom.

== Provisions ==
=== Repealed enactments ===
Section 28(2) of the act repealed 7 enactments, listed in schedule 7 to the act.

Enactments repealed by section 28(2)
Citation	Short title	Extent of repeal
1971 c. 12	Hydrocarbon Oil (Customs & Excise) Act 1971	The whole act, except section 22 and paragraphs 1 and 2 of Schedule 6.
1971 c. 68	Finance Act 1971	Section 3, except subsection (5). Section 6(2).
1972 c. 41	Finance Act 1972	In Schedule 4, in Note (4) to Group 7, the words "or is to be".
1975 c. 45	Finance (No. 2) Act 1975	Section 11.
1975 c. 45	Finance (No. 2) Act 1975	In Schedule 3, paragraphs 2 and 16 to 22.
1976 c. 40	Finance Act 1976	Sections 9 and 10.
1977 c. 36	Finance Act 1977	Section 4.
1978 c. 42	Finance Act 1978	In Schedule 12, paragraph 8.
