= Weights and Measures Act 1985 =

Act of the Parliament of the United Kingdom

Weights and Measures Act 1985 (Note: Section 99(1).)
- Act of Parliament
- Parliament of the United Kingdom
- Long title: An Act to consolidate certain enactments relating to weights and measures.
- Citation: 1985 c. 72
- Territorial extent: Great Britain (Note: Section 95.)

Dates
- Royal assent: 30 October 1985
- Commencement: 30 January 1986 (Note: Section 99(2).)

Other legislation
- Amends: See § Repealed enactments
- Repeals/revokes: See § Repealed enactments
- Amended by: Coal Industry Act 1987; Statute Law (Repeals) Act 1989; Food Safety Act 1990; Statute Law (Repeals) Act 1993; Coal Industry Act 1994; Deregulation and Contracting Out Act 1994; Statute Law (Repeals) Act 2004; Product Regulation and Metrology Act 2025

Status: Amended

Text of statute as originally enacted

Revised text of statute as amended

Text of the Weights and Measures Act 1985 as in force today (including any amendments) within the United Kingdom, from legislation.gov.uk.

The Weights and Measures Act 1985 (c. 72) is an act of the Parliament of the United Kingdom that consolidated enactments related to weights and measures in Great Britain.

The act defines the four primary units of measurement as the metre or the yard (defined in terms of the metre) for length, and the kilogram or pound (defined in terms of the kilogram) for mass. The act also requires standard physical examples to be maintained (known as "United Kingdom primary standards") for each of the four primary units. (c. 72)

In addition, the definitions of units which are multiples or sub-multiples of the primary units are defined, in terms of the primary units, and given as: mile, foot, inch, kilometre, decimetre, centimetre, millimetre, acre, square yard, square foot, hectare, decare, are, square metre, square decimetre, square centimetre, square millimetre, cubic metre, cubic decimetre, cubic centimetre, hectolitre, litre, decilitre, centilitre, millilitre, gallon, quart, pint, gill, fluid ounce, pound, ounce, ounce troy, tonne, kilogram, hectogram, gram, carat (metric) and milligram.

As originally enacted, the act also defined, in the same way, units which could not be used for trade as: furlong, chain, square mile, rood, square inch, cubic yard, cubic foot, cubic inch, bushel, peck, fluid drachm, minim, ton, hundredweight, cental, quarter, stone, dram, grain, pennyweight, ounce apothecaries, drachm, scruple, metric ton and quintal.

As of May 2026, following multiple amendments over the years since enactment, the metre, yard, kilogram and pound remain as the primary defined units and with the requirement to maintain the "United Kingdom primary standards" for them.

At the same time, all the imperial units, except pint and ounce troy (but including all of those which were originally defined as not to be used for trade) were reclassified as being available for use for trade as supplementary indications, namely: mile, furlong, chain, yard, foot, inch, square mile, acre, rood, square yard, square foot, square inch, cubic yard, cubic foot, cubic inch, bushel, peck, gallon, quart, gill, fluid ounce, fluid drachm, minim, ton, hundredweight, cental, quarter, stone, pound, ounce, dram, grain, pennyweight, ounce apothecaries, drachm, scruple and quintal. The tonne was also reclassified as being available for use for trade as a supplementary unit of measure,

== Provisions ==
=== Repealed enactments ===
Sections 98(1) and 98(2) of the act repealed 18 enactments and revoked 14 instruments, listed in parts I and II of schedule 13 to the act, respectively.

Part I - repeals
Citation	Short title	Extent of repeal
1963 c. 31	Weights and Measures Act 1963	The whole act.
1968 c. 29	Trade Descriptions Act 1968	In section 26(1), the words from "and section 37" to the end.
1970 c. 40	Agriculture Act 1970	In section 25, in subsection (3), the words from "and section 37" to "that Act" and, in subsection (5), the words from "shall have effect" to "1963 but".
1972 c. 70	Local Government Act 1972	Section 112(4)(d).
1972 c. 70	Local Government Act 1972	Section 201.
1973 c. 41	Fair Trading Act 1973	In section 27(1), the words from "and section 37" to the end.
1973 c. 65	Local Government (Scotland) Act 1973	Section 64(5)(d).
1973 c. 65	Local Government (Scotland) Act 1973	Section 149.
1973 c. 65	Local Government (Scotland) Act 1973	In Schedule 25, paragraphs 29, 30 and 31.
1974 c. 7	Local Government Act 1974	In Schedule 6, paragraph 15.
1975 c. 21	Criminal Procedure (Scotland) Act 1975	Section 289C(2)(b).
1976 c. 77	Weights and Measures &c. Act 1976	The whole act, except sections 12 to 14 and 15(1) to (3) and Schedule 6.
1977 c. 45	Criminal Law Act 1977	Section 31(2)(b).
1979 c. 2	Customs and Excise Management Act 1979	In Schedule 4, in paragraph 12, in the Table, the entry relating to the Weights and Measures Act 1963.
1979 c. 4	Alcoholic Liquor Duties Act 1979	In Schedule 3, paragraphs 3 and 4.
1979 c. 45	Weights and Measures Act 1979	The whole act.
1980 c. 43	Magistrates' Courts Act 1980	In Schedule 7, paragraphs 188 and 189.
1980 c. 65	Local Government, Planning and Land Act 1980	In section 1(4), the words "weights and measures and to". In Schedule 4, paragraphs 2 to 9 and 11 and 12.
1984 c. 30	Food Act 1984	In Schedule 10, paragraphs 4 and 5.
1985 c. 9	Companies Consolidation (Consequential Provisions) Act 1985	In Schedule 2, the entry relating to the Weights and Measures Act 1979.
1985 c. 51	Local Government Act 1985	In Schedule 8, paragraph 15(1).

Part II - revocations
Citation	Title	Extent of revocation
SI 1966/238	Weights and Measures (Solid Fuel) (Carriage by Rail) Order 1966	The whole order.
SI 1970/1708	Weights and Measures Act (Amendment of Schedules 5 and 7) Order 1970	The whole order.
SI 1974/874	Weights and Measures Act 1963 (Dentifrices) Order 1974	Article 2.
SI 1978/484	Units of Measurement Regulations 1978	Regulation 4(2) and (3).
SI 1978/484	Units of Measurement Regulations 1978	Regulation 5.
SI 1978/484	Units of Measurement Regulations 1978	Regulation 8.
SI 1979/955	Weights and Measures (Solid Fuel) (Carriage by Rail) (Amendment) Order 1979	The whole order.
SI 1979/1753	Weights and Measures Act 1963 (Solid Fuel) Order 1979	The whole order.
SI 1980/1070	Units of Measurement Regulations 1980	In regulation 9(1), 10(1) and 11, the words "or in Part IV of these Regulations".
SI 1980/1070	Units of Measurement Regulations 1980	Regulation 10(2) to (4).
SI 1980/1070	Units of Measurement Regulations 1980	In regulation 11, the words "to (3)".
SI 1980/1070	Units of Measurement Regulations 1980	Regulation 12.
SI 1980/1070	Units of Measurement Regulations 1980	Regulation 13.
SI 1980/1070	Units of Measurement Regulations 1980	Regulation 16.
SI 1980/1070	Units of Measurement Regulations 1980	Schedule 4.
SI 1980/1070	Units of Measurement Regulations 1980	In Schedule 5, the amendments of the Weights and Measures Act 1963.
SI 1980/1742	Units of Measurement (No. 2) Regulations 1980	Regulations 2 and 3.
SI 1983/1077	Weights and Measures Act 1963 (Amendment of Schedule 3) Order 1983	The whole order.
SI 1984/1314	Weights and Measures Act 1963 (Intoxicating Liquor) Order 1984	Article 2.
SI 1984/1315	Weights and Measures Act 1963 (Cheese, Fish, Fresh Fruits and Vegetables, Meat and Poultry) Order 1984	Article 3.
SI 1984/1316	Weights and Measures Act 1963 (Miscellaneous Foods) Order 1984	Articles 3 and 17.
SI 1985/435	Weights and Measures (Solid Fuel) (Carriage by Rail) (Amendment) Order 1985	The whole order.
SI 1985/777	Units of Measurement Regulations 1985	Regulation 4.
