= Excise Duties (Surcharges or Rebates) Act 1979 =

Act of the Parliament of the United Kingdom

Excise Duties (Surcharges or Rebates) Act 1979 (Note: Section 5(1).)
- Act of Parliament
- Parliament of the United Kingdom
- Long title: An Act to consolidate the provisions of section 9 of and Schedules 3 and 4 to the Finance Act 1961 with the provisions amending them.
- Citation: 1979 c. 8
- Territorial extent: United Kingdom

Dates
- Royal assent: 22 February 1979
- Commencement: 1 April 1979 (Note: Section 5(2).)

Other legislation
- Amends: See § Repealed enactments
- Repeals/revokes: See § Repealed enactments
- Amended by: Statute Law (Repeals) Act 1986; Finance Act 1996; Finance Act 2002; Transport Act 2000; Finance (No. 2) Act 2023; Finance Act 2026
- Relates to: Customs and Excise Management Act 1979; Customs and Excise Duties (General Reliefs) Act 1979; Alcoholic Liquor Duties Act 1979; Hydrocarbon Oil Duties Act 1979; Matches and Mechanical Lighters Duties Act 1979; Tobacco Products Duty Act 1979

Status: Amended

Text of statute as originally enacted

Revised text of statute as amended

Text of the Excise Duties (Surcharges or Rebates) Act 1979 as in force today (including any amendments) within the United Kingdom, from legislation.gov.uk.

The Excise Duties (Surcharges or Rebates) Act 1979 (c. 8) is an act of the Parliament of the United Kingdom that consolidated enactments related to surcharges and rebates on excise duties in the United Kingdom.

== Provisions ==
The act consolidates the power of the Treasury, originally established by section 9 of the Finance Act 1961, to impose temporary surcharges or rebates on groups of excise duties with a view to regulating the balance between demand and resources in the United Kingdom. The groups of duties covered include those on alcoholic drinks (spirits, beer, wine, made-wine and cider), hydrocarbon oil and related products, and most other excise duties, with the exception of tobacco products duty, licence duties and certain duties within the legislative competence of the Northern Ireland Parliament. The Treasury may adjust a liability by adding or deducting a percentage not exceeding 10 per cent by statutory instrument, subject to parliamentary approval within 21 days of the order being made.

=== Repealed enactments ===
Section 4(3) of the act repealed 7 enactments, listed in schedule 2 to the act.

Citation	Short title	Extent of repeal
9 & 10 Eliz. 2. c. 36	Finance Act 1961	Section 9.
9 & 10 Eliz. 2. c. 36	Finance Act 1961	Schedules 3 and 4.
1964 c. 49	Finance Act 1964	Section 8.
1968 c. 44	Finance Act 1968	Section 10(2).
1971 c. 12	Hydrocarbon Oil (Customs & Excise) Act 1971	In Schedule 6, paragraph 2.
1971 c. 68	Finance Act 1971	Section 3(5).
1976 c. 40	Finance Act 1976	Section 6(6).
1976 c. 40	Finance Act 1976	In Schedule 3, paragraph 8.
1978 c. 42	Finance Act 1978	In section 6(4) the words preceding "any duty" and the words "and any such duty".
1978 c. 42	Finance Act 1978	Section 10.
