= Customs and Excise Duties (General Reliefs) Act 1979 =

Act of the Parliament of the United Kingdom

Customs and Excise Duties (General Reliefs) Act 1979 (Note: Section 20(1).)
- Act of Parliament
- Parliament of the United Kingdom
- Long title: An Act to consolidate certain enactments relating to reliefs and exemptions from customs and excise duties, section 7 of the Finance Act 1968 and certain other related enactments.
- Citation: 1979 c. 3
- Territorial extent: United Kingdom

Dates
- Royal assent: 22 February 1979
- Commencement: 1 April 1979 (Note: Section 20(2).)
Other legislation
Amends	See § Repealed enactments
Repeals/revokes	See § Repealed enactments
Amended by	Value Added Tax Act 1983; Statute Law (Repeals) Act 1993; Criminal Procedure (Consequential Provisions) (Scotland) Act 1995; International Development Act 2002; Treaty of Lisbon (Changes in Terminology) Order 2011; Legal Aid, Sentencing and Punishment of Offenders Act 2012 (Fines on Summary Conviction) Regulations 2015; Taxation (Cross-border Trade) Act 2018; European Union Withdrawal (Consequential Modifications) (EU Exit) Regulations 2020; Value Added Tax (Amendment) (EU Exit) Regulations 2021; Finance (No. 2) Act 2023; Finance Act 2024
Relates to	Customs and Excise Management Act 1979; Alcoholic Liquor Duties Act 1979; Hydrocarbon Oil Duties Act 1979; Matches and Mechanical Lighters Duties Act 1979; Tobacco Products Duty Act 1979; Excise Duties (Surcharges or Rebates) Act 1979

Status: Partially repealed

Text of statute as originally enacted

Revised text of statute as amended

Text of the Customs and Excise Duties (General Reliefs) Act 1979 as in force today (including any amendments) within the United Kingdom, from legislation.gov.uk.

The Customs and Excise Duties (General Reliefs) Act 1979 (c. 3) is an act of the Parliament of the United Kingdom that consolidated certain enactments relating to reliefs and exemptions from customs and excise duties in the United Kingdom.

== Provisions ==
=== Repealed enactments ===
Section 19(2) of the act repealed 11 enactments and revoked 4 instruments, listed in parts I and II of schedule 3 to the act, respectively.

Part I – Enactments repealed
Citation	Short title	Extent of repeal
15 & 16 Geo. 6 & 1 Eliz. 2. c. 44	Customs and Excise Act 1952	Sections 35 to 37 and 41 to 43.
15 & 16 Geo. 6 & 1 Eliz. 2. c. 44	Customs and Excise Act 1952	Section 272.
15 & 16 Geo. 6 & 1 Eliz. 2. c. 44	Customs and Excise Act 1952	Sections 309(1), (3) and (4) and 310.
6 & 7 Eliz. 2. c. 6	Import Duties Act 1958	Sections 4, 5 and 6.
6 & 7 Eliz. 2. c. 6	Import Duties Act 1958	Section 10(1).
6 & 7 Eliz. 2. c. 6	Import Duties Act 1958	Sections 12(4) and 13.
6 & 7 Eliz. 2. c. 6	Import Duties Act 1958	Sections 15 and 16.
6 & 7 Eliz. 2. c. 6	Import Duties Act 1958	In Schedule 3, paragraphs 4, 5 and 8.
6 & 7 Eliz. 2. c. 6	Import Duties Act 1958	In Schedule 4, paragraph 2.
8 & 9 Eliz. 2. c. 44	Finance Act 1960	Section 10(1).
1967 c. 54	Finance Act 1967	Section 2.
1968 c. 44	Finance Act 1968	Section 7.
1969 c. 32	Finance Act 1969	Section 54.
1972 c. 41	Finance Act 1972	Section 55(2) and (3).
1972 c. 68	European Communities Act 1972	In section 5, subsections (5), (6) and (6A).
1972 c. 68	European Communities Act 1972	In Schedule 4, paragraph 1.
1975 c. 45	Finance (No. 2) Act 1975	In Schedule 3, paragraphs 10, 11 and 13.
1977 c. 36	Finance Act 1977	Section 12.
1978 c. 42	Finance Act 1978	Section 6(8).
1978 c. 42	Finance Act 1978	In Schedule 12, paragraphs 9, 10, 15, 19(7)(d), 20, 25 and 26.

Part II – Regulations revoked
Citation	Title	Extent of revocation
SI 1976/2130	Customs Duties (ECSC) Relief Regulations 1976	All the regulations.
SI 1977/910	Inward Processing Relief Regulations 1977	Regulation 7(1).
SI 1977/1785	Customs and Excise (Relief for Returned Goods) Regulations 1977	All the regulations.
SI 1978/1148	Customs Duties (Inward and Outward Processing Relief) Regulations 1978	Regulation 2.

== Subsequent developments ==
Sections 1 to 5 and section 14 of the act were repealed by schedule 7 to the Taxation (Cross-border Trade) Act 2018, which came into force on 31 December 2020.
