= Value Added Tax Act 1983 =

Act of the Parliament of the United Kingdom

Value Added Tax Act 1983 (Note: Section 51(1).)
- Act of Parliament
- Parliament of the United Kingdom
- Long title: An Act to consolidate the enactments relating to value added tax.
- Citation: 1983 c. 55
- Territorial extent: United Kingdom

Dates
- Royal assent: 26 July 1983
- Commencement: 26 October 1983 (Note: Section 51(2).)
- Repealed: 1 September 1994
Other legislation
Amends	Provisional Collection of Taxes Act 1968; See § Repealed enactments
Repeals/revokes	See § Repealed enactments
Amended by	Companies Consolidation (Consequential Provisions) Act 1985; Bankruptcy (Scotland) Act 1985; Debtors (Scotland) Act 1987; Water Consolidation (Consequential Provisions) Act 1991; Statute Law (Repeals) Act 1993
Repealed by	Value Added Tax Act 1994

Status: Repealed

Text of statute as originally enacted

Revised text of statute as amended

The Value Added Tax Act 1983 (c. 55) was an act of the Parliament of the United Kingdom that consolidated enactments relating to value added tax in the United Kingdom.

== Provisions ==
=== Repealed enactments ===
Section 50(2) of the act repealed 19 enactments, listed in schedule 11 to the act.

Enactments repealed by the Value Added Tax Act 1983
Citation	Short title	Extent of repeal
1972 c. 41	Finance Act 1972	Sections 1 to 51. Schedules 1 to 6.
1973 c. 51	Finance Act 1973	Sections 4 to 8. Section 55. Section 59(3)(b).
1974 c. 30	Finance Act 1974	Section 6. In section 57(3)(a) the words "except so far as it relates to value added tax" and the words from "and" onwards.
1975 c. 7	Finance Act 1975	Section 3. Section 59(3)(a).
1975 c. 45	Finance (No. 2) Act 1975	Sections 18 to 21. Section 75(3)(b).
1976 c. 40	Finance Act 1976	Section 19. Sections 21 to 23. Section 132(3)(b).
1977 c. 36	Finance Act 1977	Section 14. Section 16. Section 59(3)(b). Schedule 6.
1978 c. 42	Finance Act 1978	Section 11(3) and (4). Section 12. Section 80(3)(b). In Schedule 12, paragraph 21.
1979 c. 2	Customs and Excise Management Act 1979	In Schedule 4, paragraphs 9 to 11 and in the Table in paragraph 12 the entries relating to Part I of and Schedule 4 to the Finance Act 1972. In Schedule 7, paragraph 2 so far as it relates to value added tax.
1979 c. 3	Customs and Excise (General Reliefs) Act 1979	In Schedule 2, paragraph 2.
1979 c. 5	Hydrocarbon Oil Duties Act 1979	In Schedule 6, paragraphs 3, 4, 5 and 7.
1979 c. 6	Matches and Mechanical Lighters Duties Act 1979	Section 9(2), (3) and (4).
1979 c. 47	Finance (No. 2) Act 1979	Section 1.
1979 c. 58	Isle of Man Act 1979	In Schedule 1, paragraph 1.
1980 c. 48	Finance Act 1980	Sections 11 to 16.
1981 c. 35	Finance Act 1981	Sections 12 to 15.
1982 c. 39	Finance Act 1982	Sections 13 to 17.
1982 c. 48	Criminal Justice Act 1982	In Schedule 14, paragraph 3 so far as it relates to value added tax.
1983 c. 28	Finance Act 1983	In section 47 the words "the law relating to value added tax". In Schedule 9, paragraph 1 so far as it relates to value added tax and paragraph 2.

== Subsequent developments ==
The whole act was repealed by section 100(2) of, and schedule 15 to, the Value Added Tax Act 1994, which came into force on 1 September 1994.
