= National Savings Bank Act 1971 =

Act of the Parliament of the United Kingdom

National Savings Bank Act 1971 (Note: Section 29(1).)
- Act of Parliament
- Parliament of the United Kingdom
- Long title: An Act to consolidate certain enactments relating to the National Savings Bank, with amendments to give effect to recommendations of the Law Commission and the Scottish Law Commission.
- Citation: 1971 c. 29
- Territorial extent: United Kingdom; Isle of Man; Channel Islands; (Note: Section 29(3).)

Dates
- Royal assent: 12 May 1971
- Commencement: 12 June 1971 (Note: Section 29(2).)
Other legislation
Amends	Pensions Commutation Act 1871; See § Repealed enactments
Repeals/revokes	See § Repealed enactments
Amended by	Superannuation Act 1972; Finance Act 1980; Finance Act 1982; Trustee Savings Banks Act 1985; Finance Act 1998; Finance Act 1999; Finance Act 2003; Finance (No. 2) Act 2005; Finance Act 2008; Co-operative and Community Benefit Societies Act 2014

Status: Partially repealed

Text of statute as originally enacted

Revised text of statute as amended

Text of the National Savings Bank Act 1971 as in force today (including any amendments) within the United Kingdom, from legislation.gov.uk.

The National Savings Bank Act 1971 (c. 29) is an act of the Parliament of the United Kingdom that consolidated enactments related to the National Savings Bank in the United Kingdom, the Isle of Man and the Channel Islands.

== Provisions ==
=== Repealed enactments ===
Section 28(1) of the act repealed 14 enactments, listed in schedule 2 to the act.

Citation	Short title	Extent of repeal
2 & 3 Eliz. 2. c. 62	Post Office Savings Bank Act 1954	The whole act.
9 & 10 Eliz. 2. c. 15	Post Office Act 1961	In the Schedule, the entries relating to sections 15, 18 and 19 of the Post Office Savings Bank Act 1954.
9 & 10 Eliz. 2. c. 62	Trustee Investments Act 1961	In Schedule 4, paragraphs 4 and 5, so far as unrepealed.
1965 c. 32	Administration of Estates (Small Payments) Act 1965	In Schedule 1, in Part II, the entry relating to the Post Office Savings Bank Act 1954.
1966 c. 12	Post Office Savings Bank Act 1966	The whole act.
1969 c. 48	Post Office Act 1969	Section 94(1).
1969 c. 48	Post Office Act 1969	In section 94(2), the word "Accordingly" where it first occurs and the words from "in the Post Office Savings Bank Acts" to the end of paragraph (b).
1969 c. 48	Post Office Act 1969	Section 94(4).
1969 c. 48	Post Office Act 1969	Sections 95 to 105.
1969 c. 48	Post Office Act 1969	In Schedule 6, Parts I and II.
1970 c. 10	Income and Corporation Taxes Act 1970	In section 414(7), the definition of "investment deposit".
1970 c. 10	Income and Corporation Taxes Act 1970	In Schedule 15, in paragraph 11, in Part I of the Table, the entry relating to the Post Office Savings Bank Act 1954.
1970 c. 24	Finance Act 1970	Section 34(1)(a).
1970 c. 24	Finance Act 1970	Section 34(2).

== Subsequent developments ==
Sections 21 to 23 of, and schedule 1 to, the act were repealed by sections 120(7) and 122(4) of, and schedule 20 part XV to, the Finance Act 1980 (c. 48).

Sections 13 and 14 were repealed by sections 4(3), 4(4) and 7(3) of, and schedule 4 to, the Trustee Savings Banks Act 1985 (c. 58), and by article 2 of, and schedule 2 to, the Trustee Savings Banks Act 1985 (Appointed Day) (No. 2) Order 1986 (SI 1986/1220), which came into force on 20 July 1986.

Sections 10 and 11 were repealed by schedule 11 part 5(2) to the Finance (No. 2) Act 2005 (c. 22), with effect from 20 July 2005.

The remainder of the act has been amended on several further occasions, including by the Finance Act 1998, the Finance Act 1999, the Finance Act 2003, the Finance Act 2008 and the Co-operative and Community Benefit Societies Act 2014.
