= Hydrocarbon Oil (Customs & Excise) Act 1971 =

Act of the Parliament of the United Kingdom

Hydrocarbon Oil (Customs & Excise) Act 1971 (Note: Section 25(1).)
- Act of Parliament
- Parliament of the United Kingdom
- Long title: An Act to consolidate the enactments relating to the duties of customs and excise on hydrocarbon oil, petrol substitutes and power methylated spirits.
- Citation: 1971 c. 12
- Territorial extent: United Kingdom

Dates
- Royal assent: 16 March 1971
- Commencement: 12 April 1971 (Note: Section 25(2).)
Other legislation
Amends	See § Repealed enactments
Repeals/revokes	See § Repealed enactments
Amended by	Customs and Excise Management Act 1979; Hydrocarbon Oil Duties Act 1979; Excise Duties (Surcharges or Rebates) Act 1979

Status: Partially repealed

Text of statute as originally enacted

The Hydrocarbon Oil (Customs & Excise) Act 1971 (c. 12) is an act of the Parliament of the United Kingdom that consolidated enactments relating to the duties of customs and excise on hydrocarbon oil, petrol substitutes and power methylated spirits in the United Kingdom.

== Repealed enactments ==
Section 24(2) of the act repealed 13 enactments, listed in schedule 7 to the act.

Enactments repealed by section 24(2)
Citation	Short title	Extent of repeal
15 & 16 Geo. 6 & 1 Eliz. 2. c. 44	Customs and Excise Act 1952	Sections 123 and 124. Part VI (sections 195 to 209). In section 307(1), the definition of "power methylated spirits".
8 & 9 Eliz. 2. c. 44	Finance Act 1960	Schedule 2, Part II.
9 & 10 Eliz. 2. c. 36	Finance Act 1961	Section 2(1). Section 3.
10 & 11 Eliz. 2. c. 44	Finance Act 1962	Section 4. Schedule 7.
1963 c. 25	Finance Act 1963	Section 8.
1964 c. 49	Finance Act 1964	Section 6. Schedule 6.
1964 c. 92	Finance (No. 2) Act 1964	Section 2.
1965 c. 25	Finance Act 1965	Section 8.
1966 c. 18	Finance Act 1966	Section 6. In Schedule 2, paragraph 4.
1967 c. 54	Finance Act 1967	Section 1(5)(a). In Schedule 5, paragraph 1.
1968 c. 44	Finance Act 1968	Section 2.
1969 c. 32	Finance Act 1969	Section 1(3) and (5)(d). In Schedule 7, paragraphs 4 and 5.
1970 c. 24	Finance Act 1970	Section 8.

== Subsequent developments ==
The whole act, except section 22 and paragraphs 1 and 2 of schedule 6, were repealed by section 28(2) of, and schedule 7 to, the Hydrocarbon Oil Duties Act 1979, which came into operation on 1 April 1979.
