= Matches and Mechanical Lighters Duties Act 1979 =

Act of the Parliament of the United Kingdom

Matches and Mechanical Lighters Duties Act 1979 (Note: Section 10(1).)
- Act of Parliament
- Parliament of the United Kingdom
- Long title: An Act to consolidate the enactments relating to the excise duties on matches and mechanical lighters.
- Citation: 1979 c. 6
- Territorial extent: United Kingdom

Dates
- Royal assent: 22 February 1979
- Commencement: 1 April 1979 (Note: Section 10(2).)
- Repealed: 1 January 1993

Other legislation
- Amends: See § Repealed enactments
- Repeals/revokes: See § Repealed enactments
- Repealed by: Finance (No. 2) Act 1992
- Relates to: Customs and Excise Management Act 1979; Customs and Excise Duties (General Reliefs) Act 1979; Alcoholic Liquor Duties Act 1979; Hydrocarbon Oil Duties Act 1979; Tobacco Products Duty Act 1979; Excise Duties (Surcharges or Rebates) Act 1979

Status: Repealed

Text of statute as originally enacted

Revised text of statute as amended

The Matches and Mechanical Lighters Duties Act 1979 (c. 6) was an act of the Parliament of the United Kingdom that consolidated enactments related to excise duties on matches and mechanical lighters in the United Kingdom.

== Provisions ==
=== Repealed enactments ===
Section 9(1) of the act repealed 6 enactments, listed in the schedule to the act.

Enactments repealed by section 9(1)
Citation	Short title	Extent of repeal
15 & 16 Geo. 6 & 1 Eliz. 2. c. 44	Customs and Excise Act 1952	Sections 219 to 222.
1 & 2 Eliz. 2. c. 34	Finance Act 1953	Section 3(3) and (5).
8 & 9 Eliz. 2. c. 44	Finance Act 1960	In section 7, in subsection (1), from the beginning to the words "or similar contrivance ", and subsections (3) and (4).
1963 c. 25	Finance Act 1963	Section 4(2).
1975 c. 45	Finance (No. 2) Act 1975	Sections 12 and 13.
1975 c. 45	Finance (No. 2) Act 1975	In Schedule 3, paragraphs 8, 12 and 38.
1978 c. 42	Finance Act 1978	In Schedule 12, paragraph 6.

== Subsequent developments ==
The whole act was repealed by section 6(1) of the Finance (No. 2) Act 1992, which came into force on 1 January 1993.
