= Car Tax Act 1983 =

Act of the Parliament of the United Kingdom

Car Tax Act 1983 (Note: Section 11(1).)
- Act of Parliament
- Parliament of the United Kingdom
- Long title: An Act to consolidate the enactments relating to car tax.
- Citation: 1983 c. 53
- Territorial extent: United Kingdom (Note: Section 11(3).)

Dates
- Royal assent: 26 July 1983
- Commencement: 26 October 1983 (Note: Section 11(2).)
- Repealed: 22 July 2004

Other legislation
- Amends: See § Repealed enactments
- Repeals/revokes: See § Repealed enactments
- Amended by: Companies Consolidation (Consequential Provisions) Act 1985; Bankruptcy (Scotland) Act 1985; Debtors (Scotland) Act 1987; Statute Law (Repeals) Act 1993
- Repealed by: Statute Law (Repeals) Act 2004

Status: Repealed

Text of statute as originally enacted

Revised text of statute as amended

The Car Tax Act 1983 (c. 53) was an act of the Parliament of the United Kingdom that consolidated enactments relating to car tax in the United Kingdom. Car tax was a one-time charge levied at 10 per cent of the wholesale value of new chargeable vehicles — broadly, passenger cars and similar vehicles propelled by an internal combustion engine — charged at the point of first sale or registration.

== Provisions ==
=== Repealed enactments ===
Section 10(4) of the act repealed 7 enactments, listed in schedule 3 to the act.

Enactments repealed by section 10(4)
Citation	Short title	Extent of repeal
1972 c. 41	Finance Act 1972	Section 52.
1972 c. 41	Finance Act 1972	Schedule 7.
1975 c. 45	Finance (No. 2) Act 1975	Sections 22 to 24.
1979 c. 2	Customs and Excise Management Act 1979	In Part I of the Table in paragraph 12 of Schedule 4, the entries relating to Schedule 7 to the Finance Act 1972.
1979 c. 2	Customs and Excise Management Act 1979	In Schedule 7, paragraph 2 so far as it relates to car tax.
1981 c. 35	Finance Act 1981	Sections 16 to 18.
1982 c. 39	Finance Act 1982	Sections 18 and 19.
1982 c. 48	Criminal Justice Act 1982	In Schedule 14, paragraph 3 so far as it relates to car tax.
1983 c. 28	Finance Act 1983	Section 47 and paragraph 1 of Schedule 9 so far as they relate to car tax.

== Subsequent developments ==
The Car Tax (Abolition) Act 1992, which was deemed to have come into force on 13 November 1992, (Note: Section 5 of the Car Tax (Abolition) Act 1992.) abolished car tax by amending the Car Tax Act 1983 to provide that car tax on any vehicle falling due on or after that date would not become due and would be deemed never to have been charged. The whole act was subsequently repealed by section 1(1) of, and group 5 of part 9 of schedule 1 to, the Statute Law (Repeals) Act 2004, which came into force on 22 July 2004.
