= Customs and Excise Act 1952 =

Act of the Parliament of the United Kingdom

Customs and Excise Act 1952 (Note: Section 321(1).)
- Act of Parliament
- Parliament of the United Kingdom
- Long title: An Act to consolidate with amendments certain enactments relating to customs and excise and to extend certain provisions of those enactments to any other matter in relation to which the Commissioners of Customs and Excise are for the time being required in pursuance of any enactment to perform any duties.
- Citation: 15 & 16 Geo. 6 & 1 Eliz. 2. c. 44
- Territorial extent: United Kingdom

Dates
- Royal assent: 1 August 1952
- Commencement: 1 January 1953 (Note: Section 321(2).)
Other legislation
Amends	See § Repealed enactments
Repeals/revokes	See § Repealed enactments
Amended by	Licensing Act 1953; Licensing (Scotland) Act 1959; Vehicles (Excise) Act 1962; Betting Duties Act 1963; Purchase Tax Act 1963; Statute Law Revision Act 1963; Dangerous Drugs Act 1965; Provisional Collection of Taxes Act 1968; Family Law Reform Act 1969; Late Night Refreshment Houses Act 1969; Hydrocarbon Oil (Customs & Excise) Act 1971; Statute Law (Repeals) Act 1971; Criminal Justice Act 1972; Hallmarking Act 1973; Statute Law (Repeals) Act 1974; Consumer Credit Act 1974; Statute Law (Repeals) Act 1975; Statute Law (Repeals) Act 1976; Statute Law (Repeals) Act 1977; Customs and Excise Management Act 1979; Customs and Excise Duties (General Reliefs) Act 1979; Alcoholic Liquor Duties Act 1979; Matches and Mechanical Lighters Duties Act 1979; Tobacco Products Duty Act 1979
Relates to	Misuse of Drugs Act 1971

Status: Partially repealed

Text of statute as originally enacted

The Customs and Excise Act 1952 (15 & 16 Geo. 6 & 1 Eliz. 2. c. 44) is an act of the Parliament of the United Kingdom that consolidated with amendments enactments relating to customs and excise in the United Kingdom.

== Repealed enactments ==
Section 320(1) of the act repealed 194 enactments, listed in parts I and II of the twelfth schedule to the act.

Part I – the Parliament of the United Kingdom and its predecessors
Citation	Short title	Extent of repeal
35 Geo. 3. c. 113	Sale of Beer Act 1795	Sections seven and seventeen.
46 Geo. 3. c. 106	Revenue (Ireland) Act 1806	The whole act.
57 Geo. 3. c. 87	Excise Drawback Act 1817	The whole act.
58 Geo. 3. c. 28	Spirits (Strength Ascertainment) Act 1818	The whole act.
58 Geo. 3. c. 57	Licensed Grocers (Ireland) Act 1818	The whole act.
3 Geo. 4. c. 52	Illicit Distillation (Scotland) Act 1822	The whole act.
6 Geo. 4. c. 81	Excise Licences Act 1825	The whole act.
7 & 8 Geo. 4. c. 53	Excise Management Act 1827	The whole act except section eight.
9 Geo. 4. c. 44	Excise Act 1828	The whole act.
11 Geo. 4 & 1 Will. 4. c. 51	Beer Licences Act 1830	The whole act.
11 Geo. 4 & 1 Will. 4. c. 64	Beerhouse Act 1830	The whole act except section thirty-one and in that section the words "and the Provided always under the provisions of this Act".
1 & 2 Will. 4. c. 4	Excise Declarations Act 1831	The whole act.
2 & 3 Will. 4. c. 16	Excise Permit Act 1832	The whole act except section twelve.
3 & 4 Will. 4. c. 13	Public Revenue (Scotland) Act 1833	In section one, the words from "the officer" to "or revenues of customs or excise or".
3 & 4 Will. 4. c. 50	Customs (Repeal) Act 1833	In section three, the words from "and also" onwards.
4 & 5 Will. 4. c. 51	Excise Management Act 1834	The whole act.
5 & 6 Will. 4. c. 85	Beerhouse Act 1834	The whole act.
5 & 6 Will. 4. c. 39	Excise Act 1835	The whole act.
3 & 4 Vict. c. 17	Excise Act 1840	The whole act.
3 & 4 Vict. c. 18	Tobacco Act 1840	The whole act.
3 & 4 Vict. c. 61	Beerhouse Act 1840	The whole act.
4 & 5 Vict. c. 20	Excise Management Act 1841	The whole act.
5 & 6 Vict. c. 93	Tobacco Act 1842	The whole act.
7 & 8 Vict. c. 25	Vinegar Act 1844	The whole act.
8 & 9 Vict. c. 64	Spirits (Ireland) Act 1845	Section two.
9 & 10 Vict. c. 90	Still Licences Act 1846	The whole act.
10 & 11 Vict. c. 27	Harbours, Docks and Piers Clauses Act 1847	In section twenty-four the words "the Treasury" and "respectively".
11 & 12 Vict. c. 118	Excise Act 1848	The whole act.
11 & 12 Vict. c. 121	Liqueur Act 1848	The whole act.
11 & 12 Vict. c. 122	Bonded Warehouses Act 1848	The whole act.
12 & 13 Vict. c. 1	Inland Revenue Board Act 1849	The whole act.
12 & 13 Vict. c. 90	Customs Act 1849	The whole act.
16 & 17 Vict. c. 107	Customs Consolidation Act 1853	Sections one hundred and four to one hundred and sixteen.
17 & 18 Vict. c. 89	Spirits (Ireland) Act 1854	Sections three, six to eight, fifteen and sixteen.
17 & 18 Vict. c. 94	Public Revenue and Consolidated Charges Act 1854	In Schedule B the words "charges of management of customs" and "collection of the revenue of customs and excise".
18 & 19 Vict. c. 114	Refreshment Houses (Ireland) Act 1855	The whole act.
23 & 24 Vict. c. 27	Public House Act 1860	Section two from "and shall" onwards; section eight; in section sixteen the words "therein"; sections twenty-one to twenty-five; section twenty-nine and thirty-two; section thirty-four onwards; and section forty-two to forty-five.
23 & 24 Vict. c. 90	Game Licences Act 1860	In section three, the words from "under" to "be" and "All" onwards.
23 & 24 Vict. c. 107	Refreshment Houses (Ireland) Act 1860	In section eighteen, the words from "therein"; and sections nineteen, twenty-three to twenty-seven, twenty-nine and thirty-three.
23 & 24 Vict. c. 113	Excise Act 1860	The whole act except section forty-three.
24 & 25 Vict. c. 91	Revenue (No. 2) Act 1861	Section nine, from "and shall" onwards; sections eleven, thirteen, twenty-one, twenty-two, twenty-three and forty-six.
25 & 26 Vict. c. 22	Revenue Act 1862	The whole act except sections one and thirty-nine and so much of Schedule C as relates to the duty on every pack of playing cards.
26 & 27 Vict. c. 7	Manufactured Tobacco Act 1863	The whole act.
26 & 27 Vict. c. 33	Revenue Act 1863	The whole act except sections three and fourteen.
27 & 28 Vict. c. 18	Revenue (No. 1) Act 1864	Sections one and two; in section five the words from "upon" to "Act" where first occurring, or to "snuff" where first occurring, and the words from "provided" onwards; and Schedule B.
27 & 28 Vict. c. 35	Beerhouses (Ireland) Act 1864	Section seven.
27 & 28 Vict. c. 56	Revenue (No. 2) Act 1864	In section six, the words "sellers of playing cards (being makers thereof)"; and section fourteen.
28 & 29 Vict. c. 96	Revenue (No. 2) Act 1865	The whole act.
29 & 30 Vict. c. 39	Exchequer and Audit Departments Act 1866	In section ten, the words "bounties of the nature of drawbacks".
30 & 31 Vict. c. 5	Licences Act 1867	In section four, the words from "and shall be under" onwards.
30 & 31 Vict. c. 90	Revenue Act 1867	The whole act except section fourteen.
32 & 33 Vict. c. 14	Revenue Act 1869	The whole act.
33 & 34 Vict. c. 57	Gun Licence Act 1870	Section four from "and shall" onwards.
35 & 36 Vict. c. 93	Pawnbrokers Act 1872	Section thirty-seven from "All" onwards.
35 & 36 Vict. c. 94	Licensing Act 1872	Section forty-nine as far as the words "holder of a six-day licence"; the word "refused"; and sections eighty-one to eighty-eight.
37 & 38 Vict. c. 49	Licensing Act 1874	Sections nineteen and thirty-two.
37 & 38 Vict. c. 69	Licensing (Ireland) Act 1874	Section five.
38 & 39 Vict. c. 13	Holidays Extension Act 1875	In section one the words "bonding warehouses" and ",".
38 & 39 Vict. c. 63	Sale of Food and Drugs Act 1875	Sections thirty and thirty-one.
39 & 40 Vict. c. 35	Customs Tariff Act 1876	In the Schedule the paragraphs commencing "Goods not prohibited" and "All goods derelict" respectively.
39 & 40 Vict. c. 36	Customs Consolidation Act 1876	The whole act except sections forty-one, forty-two, forty-three, one hundred and seventy-five, one hundred and seventy-seven, and two hundred and eighty-five; in the said section forty-two the words "and if" and the table relating to tobacco, spirits or wine; and in the said section one hundred and forty-one, the stores for the use of the crew and in all other respects ",".
40 & 41 Vict. c. 13	Customs, Inland Revenue and Banks Act 1877	Sections three, five and ten and Schedule A.
40 & 41 Vict. c. 68	Destructive Insects Act 1877	Section one from "If any" onwards.
41 & 42 Vict. c. 15	Customs and Inland Revenue Act 1878	Sections three to six; in subsection (2) of section three, the words "in England and Wales for"; section twenty-five.
42 & 43 Vict. c. 21	Customs and Inland Revenue Act 1879	Sections six and seven; section eight from "and if" onwards; sections nine to fourteen; and the Schedule.
42 & 43 Vict. c. 49	Summary Jurisdiction Act 1879	In section fifty-three the words "or the Commissioners of Customs".
43 Vict. c. 14	Customs and Inland Revenue Act 1880	Section three.
43 & 44 Vict. c. 17	Revenue Offices (Scotland) Holidays Act 1880	In section one, the words "Customs and".
43 & 44 Vict. c. 20	Inland Revenue Act 1880	The whole act except sections one, forty-seven and fifty-seven and the Third Schedule; in section forty-seven the words "grant by this Act".
43 & 44 Vict. c. 24	Spirits Act 1880	The whole act.
44 & 45 Vict. c. 12	Customs and Inland Revenue Act 1881	Sections five, six, eight to fifteen, seventeen and eighteen.
45 & 46 Vict. c. 66	Passenger Vessels Licences Amendment (Scotland) Act 1882	The whole act.
45 & 46 Vict. c. 72	Revenue, Friendly Societies, and National Debt Act 1882	Sections two, three and five.
46 & 47 Vict. c. 10	Customs and Inland Revenue Act 1883	Section three.
46 & 47 Vict. c. 22	Sea Fisheries Act 1883	Section twenty-seven.
46 & 47 Vict. c. 55	Revenue Act 1883	Sections three to nine and section nineteen.
47 & 48 Vict. c. 62	Revenue Act 1884	Sections two, three and twelve.
48 & 49 Vict. c. 51	Customs and Inland Revenue Act 1885	Sections three, four, six, eight and nine.
49 & 50 Vict. c. 41	Customs Amendment Act 1886	Section two from "and while" onwards.
50 & 51 Vict. c. 7	Customs Consolidation Act, 1876, Amendment Act 1887	The whole act.
50 & 51 Vict. c. 15	Customs and Inland Revenue Act 1887	The whole act.
50 & 51 Vict. c. 28	Merchandise Marks Act 1887	Paragraph (1) of section sixteen from "subject" onwards.
51 & 52 Vict. c. 8	Customs and Inland Revenue Act 1888	Sections five, six and eight.
51 & 52 Vict. c. 33	Hawkers Act 1888	Section seven.
51 & 52 Vict. c. 41	Local Government Act 1888	Paragraph (ii) of subsection (4) of section twenty.
52 & 53 Vict. c. 7	Customs and Inland Revenue Act 1889	Section four.
52 & 53 Vict. c. 42	Revenue Act 1889	Section one; subsection (1) of section two from "any" onwards; and sections three, four, six to eight, twenty-one to twenty-five and twenty-seven.
53 & 54 Vict. c. 8	Customs and Inland Revenue Act 1890	Sections eight, nine and thirty-two to thirty-five.
53 & 54 Vict. c. 21	Inland Revenue Regulation Act 1890	Section seven; in section twenty-one, subsection (1) the words from "or for" to the end of subsection (3); in section twenty-two, the words "condemned" in subsection (1) the words "or for" to "any", and in subsection (2) the words "or for" to "seized"; in section twenty-three the words "or for"; and in the words "duties of excise".
53 & 54 Vict. c. 56	Customs Consolidation Act, 1876, Amendment Act 1890	The whole act.
54 & 55 Vict. c. 38	Stamp Duties Management Act 1891	In section twenty-six, the words from "or by" to "cards".
57 & 58 Vict. c. 60	Merchant Shipping Act 1894	Subsection (7) of section three hundred and seventy-three and subsection (1) of section five hundred and sixty-nine.
58 & 59 Vict. c. 16	Finance Act 1895	Sections six to eight.
59 & 60 Vict. c. 28	Finance Act 1896	Sections four, five, six, ten and eleven and section as far as the word "beer".
60 & 61 Vict. c. 24	Finance Act 1897	Sections two, three and six.
61 & 62 Vict. c. 10	Finance Act 1898	Section four.
61 & 62 Vict. c. 46	Revenue Act 1898	Sections two to five, subsection (1) of section eleven, and sections fourteen and fifteen.
63 & 64 Vict. c. 7	Finance Act 1900	Section nine.
63 & 64 Vict. c. 35	Oil in Tobacco Act 1900	The whole act.
1 Edw. 7. c. 7	Finance Act 1901	Sections five, seven, eight and nine.
2 Edw. 7. c. 7	Finance Act 1902	Sections five and eight and subsection (2) of section twelve.
3 Edw. 7. c. 25	Licensing (Scotland) Act 1903	Sections forty-three, forty-five and forty-seven to fifty.
3 Edw. 7. c. 46	Revenue Act 1903	Sections two, three and four.
4 Edw. 7. c. 7	Finance Act 1904	Section three and the Schedule.
6 Edw. 7. c. 8	Finance Act 1906	The whole act.
6 Edw. 7. c. 20	Revenue Act 1906	Sections one to six and eight.
7 Edw. 7. c. 13	Finance Act 1907	Section four and subsection (2) of section thirty as far as the words "those duties".
8 Edw. 7. c. 16	Finance Act 1908	Section three and subsections (1) to (3) of section four.
8 Edw. 7. c. 42	White Phosphorus Matches Prohibition Act 1908	Section three from "and matches" onwards.
8 Edw. 7. c. 65	Summary Jurisdiction (Scotland) Act 1908	In section four the words from "This Act shall" to "six months".
9 Edw. 7. c. 8	Trawling in Prohibited Areas Prevention Act 1909	Section one from "and fish" onwards.
9 Edw. 7. c. 43	Revenue Act 1909	Sections one, two, four and five and subsection (1) of section twelve as far as the words "Act".
9 Edw. 7. c. 45	Isle of Man (Customs) Act 1909	The whole act.
10 Edw. 7 & 1 Geo. 5. c. 8	Finance (1909–10) Act 1910	Sections forty-three to forty-five, forty-eight to fifty-two, eighty-three and ninety-two; in section ninety-three the words "or by the Commissioners of Customs and Excise"; and the First Schedule.
10 Edw. 7 & 1 Geo. 5. c. 24	Licensing (Consolidation) Act 1910	Sections one and sixty; subsection (2) of section sixty-four; sections eighty-nine and one hundred and six; and in paragraph (l) of subsection (2) of section one hundred and eleven the words from "and an" onwards.
10 Edw. 7 & 1 Geo. 5. c. 35	Finance Act 1910	The whole act.
1 & 2 Geo. 5. c. 2	Revenue Act 1911	Section eight.
1 & 2 Geo. 5. c. 46	Copyright Act 1911	Subsection (1) of section fourteen from "and shall" onwards.
1 & 2 Geo. 5. c. 48	Finance Act 1911	Sections two to ten; and subsection (2) of section twenty-two as far as the words "those duties".
2 & 3 Geo. 5. c. 8	Finance Act 1912	Sections three and four and subsection (1) of section thirteen.
5 & 6 Geo. 5. c. 7 (Session 2)	Finance Act 1914	Sections seven, eight and eleven, and subsection (1) of section seventeen.
5 & 6 Geo. 5. c. 46	Immature Spirits (Restriction) Act 1915	The whole act.
5 & 6 Geo. 5. c. 62	Finance Act 1915	Sections three, four, eight and nine; subsection (2) of section twenty-eight; and the Second Schedule.
5 & 6 Geo. 5. c. 89	Finance (No. 2) Act 1915	Sections seven, twelve, fifteen, sixteen and nineteen; and subsection (1) of section fifty-one as far as the words "those duties".
6 & 7 Geo. 5. c. 1	Finance (New Duties) Act 1916	Section three.
6 & 7 Geo. 5. c. 24	Finance Act 1916	Sections twenty and twenty-one; and in section twenty-two the words from "the shipment for exportation or use as ships' stores" to the proviso.
6 & 7 Geo. 5. c. 52	Trading with the Enemy and Export of Prohibited Goods Act 1916	Section three.
7 & 8 Geo. 5. c. 31	Finance Act 1917	Section six and subsection (1) of section thirty-eight as far as the words "those duties".
8 & 9 Geo. 5. c. 15	Finance Act 1918	Subsections (2) to (4) of section four; sections seven, fourteen, fifteen and sixteen; and the First and Second Schedules.
9 & 10 Geo. 5. c. 23	Anthrax Prevention Act 1919	Subsection (4) of section one.
9 & 10 Geo. 5. c. 32	Finance Act 1919	Sections six and thirteen.
10 & 11 Geo. 5. c. 18	Finance Act 1920	Sections four, five and eight.
10 & 11 Geo. 5. c. 77	Dyestuffs (Import Regulations) Act 1920	Subsection (2) of section one.
11 & 12 Geo. 5. c. 16	Importation of Plumage (Prohibition) Act 1921	Subsection (2) of section one.
11 & 12 Geo. 5. c. 32	Finance Act 1921	Sections eleven to sixteen; subsection (2) of section seventeen from "ae and" onwards; sections eighteen, nineteen and twenty-one.
11 & 12 Geo. 5. c. 47	Safeguarding of Industries Act 1921	Section eleven and subsection (2) of section twelve.
12 & 13 Geo. 5. c. 17	Finance Act 1922	Sections seven, eight and nine.
13 Geo. 5. c. 2	Irish Free State (Consequential Provisions) Act 1922	Section four.
13 & 14 Geo. 5. c. 14	Finance Act 1923	Sections two, three and eight.
14 & 15 Geo. 5. c. 21	Finance Act 1924	In section three, proviso (ii) to subsection (4); sections four, eleven to fourteen and sixteen; and the First Schedule.
14 & 15 Geo. 5. c. 24	Isle of Man (Customs) Act 1924	Subsection (2) of section four; in the Schedule, paragraphs 9, 14, 15 and 16 and the words from "a" to "that".
15 & 16 Geo. 5. c. 60	Therapeutic Substances Act 1925	Subsection (3) of section three.
16 & 17 Geo. 5. c. 22	Finance Act 1926	Sections six and eight.
17 & 18 Geo. 5. c. 10	Finance Act 1927	Subsection (3) of section five; in section six, in subsection (1) the words from "sent" to "sale", and subsections (2) and (3); sections seven, ten, and thirteen to seventeen.
18 & 19 Geo. 5. c. 17	Finance Act 1928	Subsections (2) to (10) of section two; section three; subsections (2) and (3) of section four; in section six, the proviso to subsection (1), and subsections (2) to (5); sections ten and eleven; the First Schedule; and Parts II and III of the Second Schedule except for paragraph 9.
19 & 20 Geo. 5. c. 21	Finance Act 1929	Subsection (3) of section four.
20 & 21 Geo. 5. c. 28	Finance Act 1930	Sections three and seven.
21 & 22 Geo. 5. c. 49	Finance (No. 2) Act 1931	Sections one to four.
22 & 23 Geo. 5. c. 8	Import Duties Act 1932	Section thirteen; in section fourteen, the words from the beginning to "but" and Paragraph (a); and sections sixteen and twenty.
22 & 23 Geo. 5. c. 25	Finance Act 1932	Sections one and four; subsections (4), (5) and (6) of section nine; sections eleven and twelve; the Third Schedule; and references to sections thirteen, fifteen and sixteen of the Import Duties Act, 1932.
23 & 24 Geo. 5. c. 10	Russian Goods (Import Prohibition) Act 1933	Subsection (2) of section one.
23 & 24 Geo. 5. c. 19	Finance Act 1933	Section one; subsection (5) of section two; sections three, five to eight, eleven, twenty-two to twenty-four; and the First and Second Schedules.
23 & 24 Geo. 5. c. 45	Sea-Fishing Industry Act 1933	Subsection (2) of section two from the beginning to "1876, and".
24 & 25 Geo. 5. c. 31	Debts Clearing Offices and Import Restrictions Act 1934	Subsection (3) of section two.
24 & 25 Geo. 5. c. 32	Finance Act 1934	Proviso (b) to subsection (1) of section one; sections two, three, twelve to fourteen, sixteen and seventeen; and Part II of the First Schedule.
25 & 26 Geo. 5. c. 24	Finance Act 1935	Sections two, five and twelve to sixteen; and in section thirty-four, in subsection (1) the words from "or" to and the proviso, and subsection (3).
25 & 26 Geo. 5. c. 34	Isle of Man (Customs) Act 1935	Section seven.
26 Geo. 5 & 1 Edw. 8. c. 18	Sugar Industry (Reorganisation) Act 1936	Subsection (2) of section twenty-four.
26 Geo. 5 & 1 Edw. 8. c. 34	Finance Act 1936	Subsection (2) of section one and section three.
1 Edw. 8 & 1 Geo. 6. c. 8	Beef and Veal Customs Duties Act 1937	Subsection (4) of section one from the beginning to "and".
1 Edw. 8 & 1 Geo. 6. c. 54	Finance Act 1937	Section six.
1 Edw. 8 & 1 Geo. 6. c. 67	Factories Act 1937	Subsection (3) of section sixty-one.
1 & 2 Geo. 6. c. 5	Quail Protection Act 1937	Subsection (2) of section one.
1 & 2 Geo. 6. c. 46	Finance Act 1938	Section two; subsections (3) and (5) of section three; sections four and ten to thirteen; and the First Schedule.
2 & 3 Geo. 6. c. 19	Wild Birds (Duck and Geese) Protection Act 1939	Subsection (2) of section three.
2 & 3 Geo. 6. c. 37	Wheat (Amendment) Act 1939	Subsection (2) of section nineteen from "and section" onwards.
2 & 3 Geo. 6. c. 41	Finance Act 1939	Sections one, two and five; and the First, Second and Fourth Schedules.
2 & 3 Geo. 6. c. 69	Import, Export and Customs Powers (Defence) Act 1939	In section three, subsection (3) from "In any proceedings" onwards; sections four, five and six; and subsection (3) of section seven.
2 & 3 Geo. 6. c. 109	Finance (No. 2) Act 1939	Subsections (3) and (5) of section one; subsection (2) of section three; section five; subsection (2) of section six; and the Schedule.
3 & 4 Geo. 6. c. 29	Finance Act 1940	Sections one and three; subsection (3) of section four; and the Third Schedule.
3 & 4 Geo. 6. c. 48	Finance (No. 2) Act 1940	Sections one and three; subsection (3) of section four; the Third Schedule; and in the Ninth Schedule paragraph 1 from "and" onwards and paragraph 3.
5 & 6 Geo. 6. c. 21	Finance Act 1942	Sections one, five and nine; subsection (1) of section ten except for the words from "any circumstances" onwards; sections eleven and twelve; and the First and Fourth Schedules.
6 & 7 Geo. 6. c. 28	Finance Act 1943	Sections one and five; in section twelve, paragraphs (a) and (b) of subsection (1), and subsections (2) to (7); and the First and Fourth Schedules.
7 & 8 Geo. 6. c. 23	Finance Act 1944	Sections one and five; subsection (3) of section eleven; subsection (3) of section seventeen; and the First Schedule.
8 & 9 Geo. 6. c. 19	Ministry of Fuel and Power Act 1945	So much of the Second Schedule as relates to the Finance Act, 1942.
9 & 10 Geo. 6. c. 13	Finance (No. 2) Act 1945	Sections eight to thirteen; subsection (2) of section fourteen; and the Third Schedule.
9 & 10 Geo. 6. c. 64	Finance Act 1946	Subsections (1), (3), (4) and (5) of section six; sections three and nine; subsection (2) of section twelve; and in subsection (1) of section thirteen the words "relief from duty on liquor licences".
10 & 11 Geo. 6. c. 14	Isle of Man (Customs) Act 1947	Paragraphs 1 to 5 and the words from "enactments" where first occurring to thereafter.
10 & 11 Geo. 6. c. 35	Finance Act 1947	Sections one and two; in subsection (3) of section three, the words from "instead of" onwards; and section six.
11 & 12 Geo. 6. c. 9	Finance (No. 2) Act 1947	Section one and the First Schedule.
11 & 12 Geo. 6. c. 49	Finance Act 1948	Section two; section five; subsection (3) of section four; subsections (2) and (3) of section six; section twelve; and the Second Schedule.
11 & 12 Geo. 6. c. 61	Isle of Man (Customs) Act 1948	Subsection (2) of section three.
12, 13 & 14 Geo. 6. c. 47	Finance Act 1949	Subsection (1) of section two; subsection (4) of section four; in section six, subsection (2) of subsection (3); section seven; and the proviso to subsection (1) of the Fourth Schedule.
12, 13 & 14 Geo. 6. c. 58	Isle of Man (Customs) Act 1949	Subsection (2) of section two.
14 Geo. 6. c. 15	Finance Act 1950	Subsections (2) to (6) of section one; in section two, subsection (1) from "or" onwards, the provisos to subsection (2), and subsections (3) to (8); subsections (3) to (6) of section three; section five; the proviso to subsection (1) of section six; section seven; subsection (5) of section thirteen; sections twenty and twenty-one; and the First Schedule.
14 Geo. 6. c. 36	Diseases of Animals Act 1950	In section eighty-two, in subsection (1) the words "by or under the Customs Acts" and subsection (2).
14 & 15 Geo. 6. c. 43	Finance Act 1951	Section five; section six except subsection (5); subsections (2) and (3) of section nine; sections ten, thirteen and fourteen; and the Second Schedule.
14 & 15 Geo. 6. c. 48	Dangerous Drugs Act 1951	Section thirteen.
14 & 15 Geo. 6. c. 51	Isle of Man (Customs) Act 1951	Section five.

Part II – the Parliament of Northern Ireland
Citation	Short title	Extent of repeal
18 & 19 Geo. 5. c. 9	Finance Act (Northern Ireland 1928)	Section two.
26 Geo. 5 & 1 Edw. 8. c. 11	Revaluation (Consequential Provisions) Act (Northern Ireland 1936	Section four and the Schedule.
26 Geo. 5 & 1 Edw. 8. c. 33	Finance Act (Northern Ireland 1936)	Section three.
6 & 7 Geo. 6. c. 14	Finance Act (Northern Ireland 1942)	Subsection (1) of section two except for the words from "any circumstances" onwards; and sections three, four and seven.
10 & 11 Geo. 6. c. 15	Finance Act (Northern Ireland 1947)	Section four.

== Subsequent developments ==
In section 2(1) of the act, the words "or on any jury whatsoever" were repealed by section 64(2) of, and part I of schedule 6 to, the Criminal Justice Act 1972, which came into force on 30 March 1974.

Section 293(3) of the act was repealed by section 1 of, and part I of the schedule to, the Statute Law (Repeals) Act 1974, which came into force on 27 June 1974. Sections 319 and 320 of, and schedules 11 and 12 to, the act were repealed by section 1 of, and part XI of the schedule to, the 1974 act.

Much of the act was repealed by section 177(2) of, and schedule 6 to, the Customs and Excise Management Act 1979, which came into force on 1 April 1979.
