= Exchange Equalisation Account Act 1979 =

Act of the Parliament of the United Kingdom

Exchange Equalisation Account Act 1979 (Note: Section 5(1).)
- Act of Parliament
- Parliament of the United Kingdom
- Long title: An Act to consolidate the enactments relating to the Exchange Equalisation Account.
- Citation: 1979 c. 30
- Territorial extent: United Kingdom

Dates
- Royal assent: 4 April 1979
- Commencement: 4 May 1979 (Note: Section 5(3).)
Other legislation
Amends	See § Repealed enactments
Amended by	Finance Act 1986; Finance Act 2000

Status: Amended

Text of statute as originally enacted

Revised text of statute as amended

Text of the Exchange Equalisation Account Act 1979 as in force today (including any amendments) within the United Kingdom, from legislation.gov.uk.

The Exchange Equalisation Account Act 1979 (c. 30) is an act of the Parliament of the United Kingdom that consolidated enactments relating to the Exchange Equalisation Account.

== Provisions ==
=== Repealed enactments ===
Section 5(2) of the act repealed 4 enactments, listed in the schedule to the act.

Enactments repealed by section 5(2)
Citation	Short title	Extent of repeal
22 & 23 Geo. 5. c. 25	Finance Act 1932	Section 24.
22 & 23 Geo. 5. c. 25	Finance Act 1932	In section 25(7), the words "in subsection (3) of the last preceding section of this Act and ".
9 & 10 Geo. 6. c. 64	Finance Act 1946	Section 63.
1968 c. 13	National Loans Act 1968	Section 7.
1977 c. 6	International Finance, Trade and Aid Act 1977	Section 3.
