= Pensions Commutation Act 1871 =

Act of the Parliament of the United Kingdom

Pensions Commutation Act 1871 (Note: Section 1.)
- Act of Parliament
- Parliament of the United Kingdom
- Long title: An Act to extend the provisions of the Pension Commutation Acts, 1869 and 1870, to certain Public Civil Officers, and to consolidate and amend the said Acts.
- Citation: 34 & 35 Vict. c. 36
- Territorial extent: United Kingdom

Dates
- Royal assent: 29 June 1871
- Commencement: 29 June 1871 (Note: The Acts of Parliament (Commencement) Act 1793.)
Other legislation
Amends	See § Repealed enactments
Repeals/revokes	See § Repealed enactments
Amended by	Pensions Commutation Act 1876; Pensions Commutation Act 1882; Statute Law Revision Act 1883; Statute Law Revision (No. 2) Act 1893; Perjury Act 1911; False Oaths (Scotland) Act 1933; Perjury Act (Northern Ireland) 1946; Statute Law Revision Act 1963; Defence (Transfer of Functions) (No. 1) Order 1964; National Loans Act 1968; Minister for the Civil Service Order 1968; National Savings Bank Act 1971; Superannuation Act 1972; Trustee Savings Banks Act 1976; Armed Forces Act 1981; Pensions Commutation Act 1984; Civil Partnership Act 2004; Marriage (Same Sex Couples) Act 2013 (Consequential and Contrary Provisions and Scotland) Order 2014; Marriage and Civil Partnership (Scotland) Act 2014 and Civil Partnership Act 2004 (Consequential Provisions and Modifications) Order 2014

Status: Amended

Text of statute as originally enacted

Revised text of statute as amended

Text of the Pensions Commutation Act 1871 as in force today (including any amendments) within the United Kingdom, from legislation.gov.uk.

The Pensions Commutation Act 1871 (34 & 35 Vict. c. 36) is an act of the Parliament of the United Kingdom that consolidated enactments related to the commutation of pensions payable to officers and public civil servants, allowing individuals to convert a portion of their pension benefits into a lump sum payment.

As of 2026, the act remains in force in the United Kingdom.

== Provisions ==
=== Repealed enactments ===
Section 14 of the act repealed 2 enactments, listed in that section.

Citation	Short title	Description	Extent of repeal
32 & 33 Vict. c. 32	Pensions Commutation Act 1869	The Pensions Commutation Act, 1869.	The whole act.
33 & 34 Vict. c. 101	Pensions Commutation Act 1870	An Act for amending the sixth section of the Pensions Commutation Act, 1869.	The whole act.

== Subsequent developments ==
The act was extended by the Pensions Commutation Act 1876 (39 & 40 Vict. c. 73) and further amended by the Pensions Commutation Act 1882 (45 & 46 Vict. c. 44).

In section 11, the words " or the growing produce thereof ", and section 13 of the act were repealed by section 1 of, and the schedule to, the Statute Law Revision Act 1963, which came into force on 31 July 1963.

The whole act, so far as it applies to persons to whom section 1 of that act applies, was repealed in part by section 29(4) of, and schedule 8 to, the Superannuation Act 1972, which came into force on 25 March 1972.
