= List of acts of the Parliament of the United Kingdom from 1979 =

This is a list of acts of the Parliament of the United Kingdom passed in 1979.

Acts passed since 1963 are cited by calendar year, as opposed to the convention used for earlier acts of citing the regnal year(s) in which the relevant parliamentary session was held. Each act passed in a respective year is given a chapter number (abbreviated "c."), denoted by Arabic numerals in the case of public general acts, lowercase Roman numerals in the case of local acts, or italicised Arabic numerals in the case of personal acts. These run as separate series.

84 acts of Parliament were passed in 1979: 60 public general acts and 24 local acts.

indicates that an act has been transcribed on Wikisource, indicates that an act is available to view at legislation.gov.uk, and indicates the location of the original act in the Parliamentary Archives.

== Public general acts ==
Short title	Citation	Royal assent
Long title
Price Commission (Amendment) Act 1979	1979 c. 1	12 February 1979
An Act to limit the application of section 9 of the Price Commission Act 1977. (Note: Price Commission Act 1977 (c. 33))
Customs and Excise Management Act 1979	1979 c. 2	22 February 1979
An Act to consolidate the enactments relating to the collection and management of the revenues of customs and excise and in some cases to other matters in relation to which the Commissioners of Customs and Excise for the time being perform functions, with amendments to give effect to recommendations of the Law Commission and the Scottish Law Commission.
Customs and Excise Duties (General Reliefs) Act 1979	1979 c. 3	22 February 1979
An Act to consolidate certain enactments relating to reliefs and exemptions from customs and excise duties, section 7 of the Finance Act 1968 (Note: Finance Act 1968 (c. 44)) and certain other related enactments.
Alcoholic Liquor Duties Act 1979 (repealed)	1979 c. 4	22 February 1979
An Act to consolidate the enactments relating to the excise duties on spirits, beer, wine, made-wine and cider together with certain other enactments relating to excise. (Repealed by Finance (No. 2) Act 2023 (c. 30))
Hydrocarbon Oil Duties Act 1979	1979 c. 5	22 February 1979
An Act to consolidate the enactments relating to the excise duties on hydrocarbon oil, petrol substitutes, power methylated spirits and road fuel gas.
Matches and Mechanical Lighters Duties Act 1979 (repealed)	1979 c. 6	22 February 1979
An Act to consolidate the enactments relating to the excise duties on matches and mechanical lighters. (Repealed by Finance (No. 2) Act 1992 (c. 48))
Tobacco Products Duty Act 1979	1979 c. 7	22 February 1979
An Act to consolidate the enactments relating to the excise duty on tobacco products.
Excise Duties (Surcharges or Rebates) Act 1979	1979 c. 8	22 February 1979
An Act to consolidate the provisions of section 9 of and Schedules 3 and 4 to the Finance Act 1961 (Note: Finance Act 1961 (9 & 10 Eliz. 2. c. 36)) with the provisions amending them.
Films Act 1979 (repealed)	1979 c. 9	22 February 1979
An Act to amend section 6 of the Films Act 1960. (Note: Films Act 1960 (8 & 9 Eliz. 2. c. 57)) (Repealed by Films Act 1985 (c. 21))
Public Lending Right Act 1979	1979 c. 10	22 March 1979
An Act to provide public lending right for authors, and for connected purposes.
Electricity (Scotland) Act 1979 (repealed)	1979 c. 11	22 March 1979
An Act to consolidate certain enactments relating to the North of Scotland Hydro-Electric Board and the South of Scotland Electricity Board and to functions of the Secretary of State in relation to the generation and distribution of electricity in Scotland with amendments to give effect to recommendations of the Scottish Law Commission. (Repealed by Electricity Act 1989 (c. 29))
Wages Councils Act 1979 (repealed)	1979 c. 12	22 March 1979
An Act to consolidate the enactments relating to wages councils and statutory joint industrial councils. (Repealed by Wages Act 1986 (c. 48))
Agricultural Statistics Act 1979	1979 c. 13	22 March 1979
An Act to consolidate certain enactments relating to agricultural statistics.
Capital Gains Tax Act 1979 (repealed)	1979 c. 14	22 March 1979
An Act to consolidate Part III of the Finance Act 1965 (Note: Finance Act 1965 (c. 25)) with related provisions in that Act and subsequent Acts. (Repealed by Taxation of Chargeable Gains Act 1992 (c. 12))
House of Commons (Redistribution of Seats) Act 1979 (repealed)	1979 c. 15	22 March 1979
An Act to increase the number of constituencies in Northern Ireland required by rule 1 in Schedule 2 to the House of Commons (Redistribution of Seats) Act 1949. (Note: House of Commons (Redistribution of Seats) Act 1949 (12, 13 & 14 Geo. 6. c. 66)) (Repealed by Parliamentary Constituencies Act 1986 (c. 56))
Criminal Evidence Act 1979	1979 c. 16	22 March 1979
An Act to amend paragraph (f)(iii) of the proviso to section 1 of the Criminal Evidence Act 1898 (Note: Criminal Evidence Act 1898 (61 & 62 Vict. c. 36)) and corresponding enactments extending to Scotland and Northern Ireland.
Vaccine Damage Payments Act 1979	1979 c. 17	22 March 1979
An Act to provide for payments to be made out of public funds in cases where severe disablement occurs as a result of vaccination against certain diseases or of contact with a person who has been vaccinated against any of those diseases; to make provision in connection with similar payments made before the passing of this Act; and for purposes connected therewith.
Social Security Act 1979	1979 c. 18	22 March 1979
An Act to amend the law relating to social security.
Administration of Justice (Emergency Provisions) (Scotland) Act 1979	1979 c. 19	22 March 1979
An Act to provide for emergency arrangements for the administration of justice in Scotland; to suspend in part the operation of section 17 of the Stamp Act 1891; (Note: Stamp Act 1891 (54 & 55 Vict. c. 39)) and for connected purposes.
Consolidated Fund Act 1979	1979 c. 20	22 March 1979
An Act to apply certain sums out of the Consolidated Fund to the service of the years ending on 31st March 1978 and 1979.
Forestry Act 1979	1979 c. 21	29 March 1979
An Act to re-state the power of the Forestry Commissioners to make grants and loans; and to provide for the metrication of enactments relating to forestry and forest lands.
Confirmation to Small Estates (Scotland) Act 1979	1979 c. 22	29 March 1979
An Act to amend the law relating to confirmation to small estates in Scotland; and for connected purposes.
Public Health Laboratory Service Act 1979	1979 c. 23	29 March 1979
An Act to extend the powers conferred by section 5(2)(c) of the National Health Service Act 1977 (Note: National Health Service Act 1977 (c. 49)) and to amend certain provisions of that Act relating to the Public Health Laboratory Service Board.
Appropriation Act 1979	1979 c. 24	4 April 1979
An Act to appropriate the supplies granted in this Session of Parliament.
Finance Act 1979 (repealed)	1979 c. 25	4 April 1979
An Act to continue income tax and corporation tax at the existing rates; to increase the main personal reliefs from income tax; to withdraw child tax allowances; and to continue the limit on relief for interest imposed by paragraph 5 of Schedule 1 to the Finance Act 1974. (Note: Finance Act 1974 (c. 30)) (Repealed by Income and Corporation Taxes Act 1988 (c. 1))
Legal Aid Act 1979 (repealed)	1979 c. 26	4 April 1979
An Act to amend certain enactments relating to legal aid and legal advice and assistance. (Repealed by Legal Aid Act 1988 (c. 34))
Kiribati Act 1979	1979 c. 27	19 June 1979
An Act to make provision for and in connection with the attainment by the Gilbert Islands of fully responsible status as a Republic within the Commonwealth under the name of Kiribati.
Carriage by Air and Road Act 1979	1979 c. 28	4 April 1979
An Act to enable effect to be given to provisions of certain protocols signed at Montreal on 25th September 1975 which further amend the convention relating to carriage by air known as the Warsaw Convention as amended at The Hague 1955; to modify article 26(2) of the said convention both as in force apart from those protocols and as in force by virtue of them; to provide for the amendment of certain Acts relating to carriage by air or road in consequence of the revision of relevant conventions; and to replace references to gold francs in the Carriage of Goods by Road Act 1965 (Note: Carriage of Goods by Road Act 1965 (c. 37)) and the Carriage of Passengers by Road Act 1974 (Note: Carriage of Passengers by Road Act 1974 (c. 35)) by references to special drawing rights.
International Monetary Fund Act 1979	1979 c. 29	4 April 1979
An Act to consolidate the enactments relating to the International Monetary Fund and to repeal, as obsolete, the European Monetary Agreement Act 1959 (Note: European Monetary Agreement Act 1959 (7 & 8 Eliz. 2. c. 11)) and the entries relating to it in Schedule 2 to the National Loans Act 1968. (Note: National Loans Act 1968 (c. 13))
Exchange Equalisation Account Act 1979	1979 c. 30	4 April 1979
An Act to consolidate the enactments relating to the Exchange Equalisation Account.
Prosecution of Offences Act 1979	1979 c. 31	4 April 1979
An Act to consolidate certain enactments relating to the prosecution of offences in England and Wales and to repeal certain obsolete enactments relating thereto.
Industry Act 1979	1979 c. 32	4 April 1979
An Act to make provision with respect to the limits on sums borrowed by, or paid by Ministers of the Crown to, the National Enterprise Board, the Scottish Development Agency and the Welsh Development Agency and subsidiaries of theirs, on sums paid by the Treasury in pursuance of guarantees of loans to the Board or either of those Agencies and on loans guaranteed by the Board or either of those Agencies or subsidiaries of the Scottish Development Agency.
Land Registration (Scotland) Act 1979	1979 c. 33	4 April 1979
An Act to provide a system of registration of interests in land in Scotland in place of the recording of deeds in the Register of Sasines; and for indemnification in respect of registered interests in land; to simplify certain deeds relating to land and to provide as to the effect of certain other such deeds; to enable tenants-at-will to acquire their landlords' interests in the tenancies; to provide for the fixing of fees payable to the Keeper of the Registers of Scotland; and for connected purposes.
Credit Unions Act 1979	1979 c. 34	4 April 1979
An Act to enable certain societies in Great Britain to be registered under the Industrial and Provident Societies Act 1965 (Note: Industrial and Provident Societies Act 1965 (c. 12)) as credit unions; to make further provision with respect to societies so registered; to make provision with respect to the taxation of societies so registered and of Northern Ireland credit unions; to enable reciprocal arrangements to be made in relation to Northern Ireland credit unions; to facilitate the amendment of the Industrial and Provident Societies Act (Northern Ireland) 1969; (Note: Industrial and Provident Societies Act (Northern Ireland) 1969 (c. 24 (N.I.))) and for connected purposes.
Independent Broadcasting Authority Act 1979 (repealed)	1979 c. 35	4 April 1979
An Act to confer power on the Independent Broadcasting Authority to equip themselves to transmit a television broadcasting service additional to those of the British Broadcasting Corporation and to that provided by the Authority under the Independent Broadcasting Authority Act 1973. (Note: Independent Broadcasting Authority Act 1973 (c. 19)) (Repealed by Broadcasting Act 1980 (c. 64))
Nurses, Midwives and Health Visitors Act 1979	1979 c. 36	4 April 1979
An Act to establish a Central Council for Nursing, Midwifery and Health Visiting, and National Boards for the four parts of the United Kingdom; to make new provision with respect to the education, training, regulation and discipline of nurses, midwives and health visitors and the maintenance of a single professional register; to amend an Act (Note: Health Visiting and Social Work (Training) Act 1962 (10 & 11 Eliz. 2. c. 33)) relating to the Central Council for Education and Training in Social Work; and for purposes connected with those matters.
Banking Act 1979	1979 c. 37	4 April 1979
An Act to regulate the acceptance of deposits in the course of a business; to confer functions on the Bank of England with respect to the control of institutions carrying on deposit-taking businesses; to give further protection to persons who are depositors with such institutions; to make provision with respect to advertisements inviting the making of deposits; to restrict the use of names and descriptions associated with banks and banking; to prohibit fraudulent inducement to make a deposit; to amend the Consumer Credit Act 1974 (Note: Consumer Credit Act 1974 (c. 39)) and the law with respect to instruments to which section 4 of the Cheques Act 1957 (Note: Cheques Act 1957 (5 & 6 Eliz. 2. c. 36)) applies; to repeal certain enactments relating to banks and banking; and for purposes connected therewith.
Estate Agents Act 1979	1979 c. 38	4 April 1979
An Act to make provision with respect to the carrying on of and to persons who carry on, certain activities in connection with the disposal and acquisition of interests in land; and for purposes connected therewith.
Merchant Shipping Act 1979	1979 c. 39	4 April 1979
An Act to make amendments of the law relating to pilotage, carriage by sea, liability of shipowners and salvors and pollution from ships and other amendments of the law relating to shipping, pollution and seamen.
Representation of the People Act 1979 (repealed)	1979 c. 40	4 April 1979
An Act to facilitate polling on the same day at a general election and district council elections; and to postpone certain parish or community council elections. (Repealed by Representation of the People Act 1983 (c. 2))
Pneumoconiosis etc. (Workers' Compensation) Act 1979	1979 c. 41	4 April 1979
An Act to make provision for lump sum payments to or in respect of certain persons who are, or were immediately before they died, disabled by pneumoconiosis, byssinosis or diffuse mesothelioma; and for connected purposes.
Arbitration Act 1979 (repealed)	1979 c. 42	4 April 1979
An Act to amend the law relating to arbitrations and for purposes connected therewith. (Repealed by Arbitration Act 1996 (c. 23))
Crown Agents Act 1979	1979 c. 43	4 April 1979
An Act to reconstitute as a body corporate, and make other provision with respect to, the Crown Agents for Oversea Governments and Administrations, including the establishment of a Board to realise certain of their assets.
Leasehold Reform Act 1979	1979 c. 44	4 April 1979
An Act to provide further protection, for a tenant in possession claiming to acquire the freehold under the Leasehold Reform Act 1967, (Note: Leasehold Reform Act 1967 (c. 88)) against artificial inflation of the price he has to pay.
Weights and Measures Act 1979 (repealed)	1979 c. 45	4 April 1979
An Act to make further provision with respect to weights and measures. (Repealed by Weights and Measures Act 1985 (c. 72))
Ancient Monuments and Archaeological Areas Act 1979	1979 c. 46	4 April 1979
An Act to consolidate and amend the law relating to ancient monuments; to make provision for the investigation, preservation and recording of matters of archaeological or historical interest and (in connection therewith) for the regulation of operations or activities affecting such matters; to provide for the recovery of grants under section 10 of the Town and Country Planning (Amendment) Act 1972 (Note: Town and Country Planning (Amendment) Act 1972 (c. 42)) or under section 4 of the Historic Buildings and Ancient Monuments Act 1953 (Note: Historic Buildings and Ancient Monuments Act 1953 (1 & 2 Eliz. 2. c. 49)) in certain circumstances; and to provide for grants by the Secretary of State to the Architectural Heritage Fund.
Finance (No. 2) Act 1979	1979 c. 47	26 July 1979
An Act to grant certain duties, to alter other duties, and to amend the law relating to the National Debt and the Public Revenue, and to make further provision in connection with Finance.
Pensioners' Payments and Social Security Act 1979	1979 c. 48	26 July 1979
An Act to make provision for lump sum payments to pensioners and to modify section 125 of the Social Security Act 1975. (Note: Social Security Act 1975 (c. 14))
Education Act 1979 (repealed)	1979 c. 49	26 July 1979
An Act to repeal sections 1, 2 and 3 of the Education Act 1976 (Note: Education Act 1976 (c. 81)) and to make provision as to certain proposals submitted or transmitted to the Secretary of State under the said section 2. (Repealed by Education Act 1996 (c. 56))
European Parliament (Pay and Pensions) Act 1979 or the European Assembly (Pay and Pensions) Act 1979 (Note: The original short title of the European Parliament (Pay and Pensions) Act 1979 was the European Assembly (Pay and Pensions) Act 1979, but this was amended by the European Communities (Amendment) Act 1986 (c. 58) on 7 November 1986.)	1979 c. 50	26 July 1979
An Act to make provision for the payment of salaries and pensions, and the provision of allowances and facilities, to or in respect of Representatives to the Assembly of the European Communities.
Appropriation (No. 2) Act 1979	1979 c. 51	27 July 1979
An Act to apply a sum out of the Consolidated Fund to the service of the year ending on 31st March 1980, to appropriate the supplies granted in this Session of Parliament, and to repeal certain Consolidated Fund and Appropriation Acts.
Southern Rhodesia Act 1979	1979 c. 52	14 November 1979
An Act to provide for the grant of a constitution for Zimbabwe to come into effect on the attainment by Southern Rhodesia, under any Act hereafter passed for that purpose, of fully responsible status as a Republic under the name of Zimbabwe, and to make other provision with respect to Southern Rhodesia.
Charging Orders Act 1979	1979 c. 53	6 December 1979
An Act to make provision for imposing charges to secure payment of money due, or to become due, under judgments or orders of court; to provide for restraining and prohibiting dealings with, and the making of payments in respect of, certain securities; and for connected purposes.
Sale of Goods Act 1979	1979 c. 54	6 December 1979
An Act to consolidate the law relating to the sale of goods.
Justices of the Peace Act 1979 (repealed)	1979 c. 55	6 December 1979
An Act to consolidate certain enactments relating to justices of the peace (including stipendiary magistrates), justices' clerks and the administrative and financial arrangements for magistrates' courts, and to matters connected therewith, with amendments to give effect to recommendations of the Law Commission. (Repealed by Justices of the Peace Act 1997 (c. 25))
Consolidated Fund (No. 2) Act 1979	1979 c. 56	20 December 1979
An Act to apply certain sums out of the Consolidated Fund to the service of the years ending on 31st March 1980 and 1981.
European Communities (Greek Accession) Act 1979 (repealed)	1979 c. 57	20 December 1979
An Act to extend the meaning in Acts, Measures and subordinate legislation of "the Treaties" and "the Community Treaties" in connection with the accession of the Hellenic Republic to the European Communities. (Repealed by European Union (Withdrawal) Act 2018 (Consequential Modifications and Repeals and Revocations) (EU Exit) Regulations 2019 (SI 2019/628))
Isle of Man Act 1979	1979 c. 58	20 December 1979
An Act to make such amendments of the law relating to customs and excise, value added tax, car tax and the importation and exportation of goods as are required for giving effect to an Agreement between the government of the United Kingdom and the government of the Isle of Man signed on 15th October 1979; to make other amendments as respects the Isle of Man in the law relating to those matters; to provide for the transfer of functions vested in the Lieutenant Governor of the Isle of Man or, as respects that Island, in the Commissioners of Customs and Excise; and for purposes connected with those matters.
Shipbuilding Act 1979	1979 c. 59	20 December 1979
An Act to raise the limits imposed by section 11 of the Aircraft and Shipbuilding Industries Act 1977 (Note: Aircraft and Shipbuilding Industries Act 1977 (c. 3)) in relation to the finances of British Shipbuilders and its wholly owned subsidiaries; and to extend the application of section 10 of the Industry Act 1972 (Note: Industry Act 1972 (c. 63)) to include the alteration of completed and partially constructed ships and mobile offshore installations.
Zimbabwe Act 1979	1979 c. 60	20 December 1979
An Act to make provision for, and in connection with, the attainment by Zimbabwe of fully responsible status as a Republic.

== Local acts ==
Short title	Citation	Royal assent
Long title
Tyne and Wear Passenger Transport Act 1979	1979 c. i	12 February 1979
An Act to make provision for the regulation and integration of passenger transport services provided by the Tyne and Wear Passenger Transport Executive; the rating of the Tyne and Wear Metropolitan Railway; and for other purposes.
Inverclyde District Council Order Confirmation Act 1979 (repealed)	1979 c. ii	22 February 1979
An Act to confirm a Provisional Order under the Private Legislation Procedure (Scotland) Act 1936, (Note: Private Legislation Procedure (Scotland) Act 1936 (26 Geo. 5 & 1 Edw. 8. c. 52)) relating to Inverclyde District Council. (Repealed by Statute Law (Repeals) Act 1998 (c. 43))
	Inverclyde District Council Order 1978 (Note: Although passed in 1979, the short title specifies the year 1978.) Provisional Order to confer powers on the Inverclyde District Council with respect to stray dogs; and for other purposes.	
Solicitors in the Supreme Courts of Scotland (Amendment) Order Confirmation Act 1979 (repealed)	1979 c. iii	22 February 1979
An Act to confirm a Provisional Order under the Private Legislation Procedure (Scotland) Act 1936, relating to Solicitors in the Supreme Courts of Scotland (Amendment). (Repealed by Statute Law (Repeals) Act 1998 (c. 43))
	Solicitors in the Supreme Courts of Scotland (Amendment) Order 1978 Provisional Order to vary and amend the provisions of the Solicitors in the Supreme Courts of Scotland Act 1871 (Note: Solicitors in the Supreme Courts of Scotland Act 1871 (34 & 35 Vict. c. cvii)) and for purposes connected therewith.	
Tamar Bridge Act 1979	1979 c. iv	22 February 1979
An Act to amend the Tamar Bridge Act 1957, (Note: Tamar Bridge Act 1957 (5 & 6 Eliz. 2. c. xxviii)) to repeal certain provisions of that Act and of the County of Cornwall Act 1929 (Note: County of Cornwall Act 1929 (19 & 20 Geo. 5. c. lxxxii)) and to provide that the other provisions of the Tamar Bridge Act 1957 shall continue to have effect notwithstanding section 262(9) of the Local Government Act 1972; (Note: Local Government Act 1972 (c. 70)) and for other purposes.
Shetland Islands Council Order Confirmation Act 1979	1979 c. v	4 April 1979
An Act to confirm a Provisional Order under the Private Legislation Procedure (Scotland) Act 1936, relating to Shetland Islands Council.
	Shetland Islands Council Order 1979 Provisional Order (as modified) to amend the Zetland County Council Act 1974; (Note: Zetland County Council Act 1974 (c. viii)) and for related purposes.	
Lerwick Harbour Order Confirmation Act 1979	1979 c. vi	4 April 1979
An Act to confirm a Provisional Order under the Private Legislation Procedure (Scotland) Act 1936, relating to Lerwick Harbour.
	Lerwick Harbour Order 1979 Provisional Order to authorise the Trustees of the port and harbour of Lerwick to construct new works in connection with the improvement of the harbour; and for other purposes.	
Gairloch Piers Order Confirmation Act 1979 (repealed)	1979 c. vii	4 April 1979
An Act to confirm a Provisional Order under the Private Legislation Procedure (Scotland) Act 1936, relating to Gairloch Piers. (Repealed by Highland Regional Council (Harbours) Order Confirmation Act 1991 (c. xii))
	Gairloch Piers Order 1979 Provisional Order to confer powers on the Highland Regional Council with respect to their piers at Gairloch; and for purposes connected therewith.	
Ross and Cromarty (Coastal Waters Pollution) Order Confirmation Act 1979	1979 c. viii	26 July 1979
An Act to confirm a Provisional Order under the Private Legislation Procedure (Scotland) Act 1936, relating to Ross and Cromarty (Coastal Waters Pollution).
	Ross and Cromarty (Coastal Waters Pollution) Order 1979 Provisional Order to empower the Ross and Cromarty District Council to make byelaws for the prevention and suppression of pollution and other nuisances in connection with activities related to vessels in certain coastal areas adjacent to the district; to enact interim byelaws; and for related purposes.	
Ipswich Port Authority Act 1979 (repealed)	1979 c. ix	26 July 1979
An Act to extend the time for the completion of the works authorised by the Ipswich Dock Act 1971; (Note: Ipswich Dock Act 1971 (c. xiv)) to increase the borrowing powers of the Ipswich Port Authority; and for connected purposes. (Repealed by Ipswich Port Authority Act 1986 (c. xv))
British Railways (Selby) Act 1979	1979 c. x	26 July 1979
An Act to empower the British Railways Board to construct works and to acquire lands in the district of Selby in the county of North Yorkshire; to confer further powers on the Board; and for other purposes.
Van Diemen's Land Company Act 1979	1979 c. xi	14 November 1979
An Act to confer additional powers on The Van Diemen's Land Company and to make further provision for the regulation and management of the affairs of the Company; and for purposes connected therewith.
Greater London Council (Money) Act 1979	1979 c. xii	6 December 1979
An Act to regulate the expenditure on capital account and on lending to other persons by the Greater London Council during the financial period from 1st April 1979 to 30th September 1980; and for other purposes.
Sheffield General Cemetery Act 1979	1979 c. xiii	6 December 1979
An Act to transfer the Sheffield General Cemetery to the Council of the city of Sheffield, to provide for the removal of restrictions attaching to the cemetery; and for other purposes.
Scottish Equitable Life Assurance Society Act 1979	1979 c. xiv	6 December 1979
An Act to repeal the Scottish Equitable Life Assurance Society's Act 1902 (Note: Scottish Equitable Life Assurance Society Act 1902 (2 Edw. 7. c. xxxviii)) and to make new provision for the regulation and management of the Society; and for other purposes.
Severn-Trent Water Authority Act 1979	1979 c. xv	6 December 1979
An Act to repeal the Dudley Sewage Act 1879; (Note: Dudley Sewage Act 1879 (42 & 43 Vict. c. c)) to confer powers on the Severn-Trent Water Authority; and for other purposes.
Felixstowe Dock and Railway Act 1979	1979 c. xvi	6 December 1979
An Act to empower the Felixstowe Dock and Railway Company to construct works; to authorise the raising of additional capital and to provide for the capitalising of reserves and other funds; to extend and alter the limits of the dock; to confer further powers on the Company, and for other purposes.
Stirling District Council Order Confirmation Act 1979 (repealed)	1979 c. xvii	20 December 1979
An Act to confirm a Provisional Order under the Private Legislation Procedure (Scotland) Act 1936, relating to Stirling District Council. (Repealed by Statute Law (Repeals) Act 1995 (c. 44))
	Stirling District Council Order 1979 Provisional Order to confer powers on the Stirling District Council with respect to stray dogs; and for other purposes.	
Dumbarton District Council Order Confirmation Act 1979 (repealed)	1979 c. xviii	20 December 1979
An Act to confirm a Provisional Order under the Private Legislation Procedure (Scotland) Act 1936, relating to Dumbarton District Council. (Repealed by Statute Law (Repeals) Act 1998 (c. 43))
	Dumbarton District Council Order 1979 Provisional Order to confer powers on the Dumbarton District Council with respect to stray dogs; and for other purposes.	
Greater Glasgow Passenger Transport Order Confirmation Act 1979	1979 c. xix	20 December 1979
An Act to confirm a Provisional Order under the Private Legislation Procedure (Scotland) Act 1936, relating to Greater Glasgow Passenger Transport.
	Greater Glasgow Passenger Transport Order 1979 Provisional Order to confer further powers upon the Greater Glasgow Passenger Transport Executive; and for other purposes.	
Kilmarnock and Loudoun District Council Order Confirmation Act 1979 (repealed)	1979 c. xx	20 December 1979
An Act to confirm a Provisional Order under the Private Legislation Procedure (Scotland) Act 1936, relating to Kilmarnock and Loudoun District Council. (Repealed by Statute Law (Repeals) Act 1995 (c. 44))
	Kilmarnock and Loudoun District Council Order 1979 Provisional Order to confer powers on the Kilmarnock and Loudoun District Council with respect to stray dogs; and for other purposes.	
Scots Episcopal Fund Order Confirmation Act 1979 (repealed)	1979 c. xxi	20 December 1979
An Act to confirm a Provisional Order under the Private Legislation Procedure (Scotland) Act 1936, relating to the Scots Episcopal Fund. (Repealed by Statute Law (Repeals) Act 1998 (c. 43))
	Scots Episcopal Fund Order 1979 Provisional Order to provide for the disposal of the trust funds held by the Trustees incorporated by the Scots Episcopal Fund Act 1864, (Note: Scots Episcopal Fund Act 1864 (27 & 28 Vict. c. 2)) for the dissolution of the trust thereby constituted and for the repeal of the said Act; and for purposes connected therewith.	
University College London Act 1979	1979 c. xxii	20 December 1979
An Act to transfer the rights, properties and liabilities of that part of the University of London formerly known as University of London, University College to the Corporation of University College London and to achieve the re-unification of University College London and University College Hospital Medical School; and for other purposes.
Greater London Council (General Powers) Act 1979	1979 c. xxiii	20 December 1979
An Act to confer further powers upon the Greater London Council and other authorities; and for other purposes.
City of London (Various Powers) Act 1979	1979 c. xxiv	20 December 1979
An Act to empower the Conservators of Epping Forest to grant to the Minister of Transport interests or rights in land for road purposes; to provide for the alteration of the site of Billingsgate Market; to empower the Board of Governors of the Museum of London to make charges for admission; to make further provision with respect to Tower Bridge and Spitalfields Market; and for other purposes.

== See also ==
- List of acts of the Parliament of the United Kingdom
