= Finance Act 1999 =

Act of the Parliament of the United Kingdom

Finance Act 1999 (Note: Section 140.)
- Act of Parliament
- Parliament of the United Kingdom
- Long title: An Act to grant certain duties, to alter other duties, and to amend the law relating to the National Debt and the Public Revenue, and to make further provision in connection with Finance.
- Citation: 1999 c. 16
- Territorial extent: United Kingdom

Dates
- Royal assent: 27 July 1999
- Commencement: 27 July 1999 (Note: Section 4(b) of the Interpretation Act 1978.)
Other legislation
| Amends | Stamp Duties Management Act 1891; Stamp Act 1891; National Savings Bank Act 1971; Betting and Gaming Duties Act 1981; Inheritance Tax Act 1984; Value Added Tax Act 1994 |
| Repeals/revokes | Taxation of Chargeable Gains Act 1992 |
| Amended by | Abolition of Feudal Tenure etc. (Scotland) Act 2000; Capital Allowances Act 2001; Work and Families Act 2006; Charities Act 2011; Statute Law (Repeals) Act 2013 |

Status: Amended

Text of statute as originally enacted

Text of the Finance Act 1999 as in force today (including any amendments) within the United Kingdom, from legislation.gov.uk.

The Finance Act 1999 (c. 16) is an act of the Parliament of the United Kingdom prescribing changes to Excise Duties; Value Added Tax; Income Tax; Corporation Tax; and Capital Gains Tax. It enacts the 1999 Budget speech made by Chancellor of the Exchequer Gordon Brown to the Parliament of the United Kingdom.

In the UK, the Chancellor delivers an annual Budget speech outlining changes in spending, tax and duty. The respective year's Finance Act is the mechanism to enact the changes.

Long-term rules governing the various taxation methods are contained within specific taxation acts (for instance Capital Gains Tax Legislation is contained within Taxation of Chargeable Gains Act 1992). The Finance Act details amendments to be made to each one of these acts.
