= Finance Act 1998 =

Act of the Parliament of the United Kingdom

Finance Act 1998 (Note: Section 166.)
- Act of Parliament
- Parliament of the United Kingdom
- Long title: An Act to grant certain duties, to alter other duties, and to amend the law relating to the National Debt and the Public Revenue, and to make further provision in connection with Finance.
- Citation: 1998 c. 36
- Territorial extent: United Kingdom

Dates
- Royal assent: 31 July 1998
- Commencement: 31 July 1998 (Note: Section 4(b) of the Interpretation Act 1978.)
Other legislation
Amends	Stamp Duties Management Act 1891; National Savings Bank Act 1971; Inheritance Tax Act 1984; Value Added Tax Act 1994
Amended by	Capital Allowances Act 2001; Statute Law (Repeals) Act 2013; Finance Act 2015

Status: Amended

Text of statute as originally enacted

Revised text of statute as amended

The Finance Act 1998 (c. 36) is an act of the Parliament of the United Kingdom prescribing changes to Excise Duties; Value Added Tax; Income Tax; Corporation Tax; and Capital Gains Tax. It enacts the 1998 Budget speech made by Chancellor of the Exchequer Gordon Brown to the Parliament of the United Kingdom.

In the UK, the Chancellor delivers an annual Budget speech outlining changes in spending, tax and duty. The respective year's Finance Act is the mechanism to enact the changes.

The rules governing the various taxation methods are contained within the various taxation acts. (For instance Capital Gains Tax Legislation is contained within Taxation of Chargeable Gains Act 1992). The Finance Act details amendments to be made to each one of these acts.

== Taper Relief ==
Notable changes in the aact included calculation changes to the taxable proportion of a capital gain by the replacement of indexation allowance with taper relief.

== TESSAs ==
The act announced the phasing out of Tax-Exempt Special Savings Accounts preventing new accounts being opened after 5 April 1999.
