= 2016 United Kingdom budget =

- Presented: Wednesday 16 March 2016
- Country: United Kingdom
- Parliament: 56th
- Party: Conservative Party
- Chancellor: George Osborne
- Total revenue: £716 billion ($0.98 trillion)
- Total expenditures: £772 billion ($1.06 trillion)
- Deficit: £56 billion (2.9% of GDP)
- Website: 2016 UK Budget

The 2016 United Kingdom budget was delivered by George Osborne, the Chancellor of the Exchequer, to the House of Commons on Wednesday, 16 March 2016.

It was the second fully Conservative budget delivered by Osborne, following the July 2015 budget. This was to be Osborne's last budget as Chancellor, as he was replaced by Philip Hammond on 13 July by way of Theresa May's cabinet reshuffle.

== Background ==
In the November 2015 Autumn Statement, the independent Office for Budget Responsibility predicted that the UK economy would grow by 2.4% in 2016.

== Budget announcements ==
- Osborne will introduce a sugar tax on soft drinks from 2018, raising around half a billion pounds which will be used to fund after-school activities such as sport and art.
- The predicted GDP growth for 2016 was lowered to 2% from 2.4%.
- The tax-free allowance will be raised to £11,500 and the 40p tax threshold will increase to £45,000.
- There will be a new savings account, the Lifetime ISA, for the under-40s, with the government putting in £1 for every £4 saved.
- Funding was earmarked for High Speed 3 (an east-west rail line across the North of England), Crossrail 2 (a north-south rail line across London), a road tunnel across the Pennines and upgrades to the M62 motorway.
- £115 million was allocated to tackle rough sleeping.
- Public sector employers will be required to contribute a higher proportion to their workers' pensions from 2019–2020.
- Tobacco duty was increased by 2%.
- Hand rolling tobacco duty was increased by 3%.
- Fuel duty frozen at 57.95p per litre.
- VAT on tampons was to be cut from 5% to 0%, as soon as EU obligations allowed. (The tax on women's sanitary products was abolished on 1 January 2021, when the transitional Brexit period expired.)
- The halving of tolls across both Severn Bridges from 2018.

== 2016–17 taxes and spending ==
=== Taxes ===
Receipts	2016-2017 revenues (£ billions).
Income Tax	182
Value Added Tax (VAT)	138
National Insurance	126
Excise duties	48
Corporate Tax	43
Council Tax	30
Business rates	28
Other	120
Total Government revenue	715

=== Spending ===
Department	2016-2017 Expenditure (£ billions).
Social protection	240
Health	145
Education	102
Debt interest	39
Defence	46
Public order and safety	34
Personal social services	30
Housing and Environment	34
Transport	29
Industry, agriculture and employment	24
Other	49
Total Government spending	772

== Reactions ==
The Leader of the Opposition, Jeremy Corbyn, described the budget as having "unfairness at its very core", singling out cuts to disability benefits and corporate tax for particular criticism. However, he expressed his approval for the introduction of the sugar levy in his House of Commons response.

Secretary of State for Work and Pensions, Iain Duncan Smith, resigned two days after the presentation of the budget, describing planned cuts within his department "as a compromise too far".

== See also ==
- Budget of the United Kingdom
