= Finance Act =

Fiscal legislation enacted by the UK Parliament

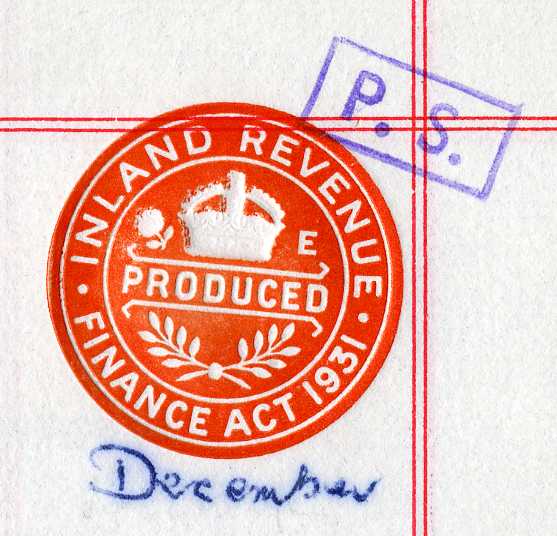
Embossed stamp certifying that a conveyance has been produced in accordance with the Finance Act 1931

A Finance Act is the headline fiscal (budgetary) legislation enacted by the UK Parliament, containing multiple provisions as to taxes, duties, exemptions and reliefs at least once per year, and in particular setting out the principal tax rates for each fiscal year.

== Overview ==
In the UK, the Chancellor of the Exchequer delivers a Budget speech on Budget Day, outlining changes in spending, as well as tax and duty. The changes to tax and duty are passed as law, and each year form the respective Finance Act. Additional Finance Acts are also common and are the result of a change in governing party due to a general election, a pressing loophole or defect in the law of taxation, or a backtrack with regard to government spending or taxation.

The rules governing the various taxation methods are contained within the relevant taxation acts. Capital Gains Tax legislation, for example, is contained within Taxation of Chargeable Gains Act 1992. The Finance Act details amendments to be made to each one of these Acts. The main taxes are Excise Duties, Value Added Tax, Income Tax, Corporation Tax, and Capital Gains Tax.

== Excise ==
Excise duties are inland duties levied on articles at the time of their manufacture.

- Alcoholic liquor duties
  - Alcoholic Liquor Duties Act 1979
- Hydrocarbon Oil Duty
  - Hydrocarbon Oil Duties Act 1979
- Tobacco products duty
  - Tobacco Products Duty Act 1979
- Gaming duty
  - Finance Act 1997 (rates of gaming duty)
- Amusement Machine Licence Duty
  - Betting and Gaming Duties Act 1981
- Vehicle Excise Duty
  - Vehicle Excise and Registration Act 1994

== Specific finance acts ==
=== Finance Act 1910 ===
The Finance (1909-10) Act 1910 (10 Edw. 7. & 1 Geo. 5. c. 8) resulted in a significant net increase in taxation, and it also requisitioned a survey dubbed by right-wing journalists the "Lloyd George's Domesday land-survey", in particular entailing the 1910–1915 valuation maps.

Each property and related right under and over land (hereditament) in England and Wales was surveyed and valued, so Increment Value Duty based on land value could be levied when any property was sold. The initial rate was 20% of the increase in land-value between the date of the survey and the date of sale (capital gain). Exemptions included farmland and plots smaller than 50 acres (20 ha; 200,000 m^{2}). This tax was substantively altered by the repeal of s. 67 by the Finance Act 1920 which superseded it.

As part of the survey, landowners had to fill in a form, and the resulting records are extremely useful for local history.

The records today consist of:

- working maps
- valuation maps
- valuation books
- field books.

The valuation maps and books are kept in local record offices, and the other items are in the National Archives at Kew, London (field books in series IR58; working maps in series IR121 to IR135 according to region and each region has up to 22 different districts).

=== Finance Act 1920 ===
Finance Act 1920 (Note: Section 64(2).)
- Act of Parliament
- Parliament of the United Kingdom
- Long title: An Act to grant certain duties of Customs and Inland Revenue (including Excise), to alter other duties, and to amend the Law relating to Customs and Inland Revenue (including Excise), and the National Debt, and to make further provision in connection with Finance.
- Citation: 10 & 11 Geo. 5. c. 18
- Territorial extent: United Kingdom

Dates
- Royal assent: 4 August 1920
- Commencement: 4 August 1920 (Note: The Acts of Parliament (Commencement) Act 1793.)
Other legislation
Amended by	Finance Act 1921; Finance Act 1927; Statute Law Revision Act 1927; Finance (No. 2) Act 1945; Finance Act 1949; Vehicles (Excise) Act 1949; Statute Law Revision Act 1950; Income Tax Act 1952; Customs and Excise Act 1952; Statute Law Revision Act 1953; Finance Act 1959; Statute Law Revision Act 1959; Finance Act 1962; Finance Act 1963; Finance Act 1964; Statute Law Revision Act 1964; Statute Law (Repeals) Act 1969; Finance Act 1970; Finance Act 1973; Finance Act 1974; Statute Law (Repeals) Act 1976; Finance Act 1976; Finance Act 1986

Status: Amended

Text of statute as originally enacted

Revised text of statute as amended

The Finance Act 1920 (10 & 11 Geo. 5. c. 18) is an act of the Parliament of the United Kingdom. The act included a new "Duty on licences for mechanically propelled vehicles" (Vehicle Excise Duty, which went into the Road Fund until 1936), repealed "customs duties on motor spirit and motor spirit dealers licence duties", and introduced "Provisions as to spirits used for generating mechanical power", along with other provisions related to income tax and tax on alcohol.

=== Finance Act 1946 ===
Finance Act 1946 (Note: Section 67(1).)
- Act of Parliament
- Parliament of the United Kingdom
- Long title: An Act to grant certain duties, to alter other duties, and to amend the law relating to the Public Revenue and the National Debt, and to make further provision in connection with Finance.
- Citation: 9 & 10 Geo. 6. c. 64
- Territorial extent: United Kingdom

Dates
- Royal assent: 1 August 1946
- Commencement: 1 August 1946
Other legislation
Amends	Customs and Inland Revenue Act 1882
Amended by	Statute Law Revision Act 1953; Statute Law Revision Act 1959; National Loans Act 1968Statute Law (Repeals) Act 1971; Exchange Equalisation Account Act 1979

Status: Partially repealed

Text of statute as originally enacted

Revised text of statute as amended

The Finance Act 1946 (9 & 10 Geo. 6. c. 64) established the National Land Fund and much of National Savings and Investments.

=== Finance Act 1948 ===
Finance Act 1948 (Note: Section 82(1).)
- Act of Parliament
- Parliament of the United Kingdom
- Long title: An Act to grant certain duties, to alter other duties, and to amend the law relating to the National Debt and the Public Revenue, and to make further provision in connection with Finance.
- Citation: 11 & 12 Geo. 6. c. 49
- Territorial extent: United Kingdom

Dates
- Royal assent: 30 July 1948
- Commencement: 30 July 1948
Other legislation
Amended by	Statute Law Revision Act 1953; Statute Law Revision Act 1959; Statute Law (Repeals) Act 1971; Statute Law (Repeals) Act 1975; Statute Law (Repeals) Act 1976; Statute Law (Repeals) Act 2008

Status: Partially repealed

Text of statute as originally enacted

Revised text of statute as amended

The Finance Act 1948 (11 & 12 Geo. 6. c. 49) established the one-off "Special Contribution"

=== Finance Act 1963 ===
Finance Act 1963 (Note: Section 73(1).)
- Act of Parliament
- Parliament of the United Kingdom
- Long title: An Act to grant certain duties, to alter other duties, and to amend the law relating to the National Debt, and the Public Revenue, and to make further provision in connection with Finance.
- Citation: 1963 c. 25
- Territorial extent: United Kingdom

Dates
- Royal assent: 31 July 1963
- Commencement: 31 July 1963 (except part IV); 1 August 1963 (part IV); (Note: Section 73(2).)
Other legislation
Amends	Finance Act 1920; Tithe Act 1936; Tithe Act 1951; Income Tax Act 1952; Customs and Excise Act 1952; Finance Act 1960
Amended by	Electricity and Gas Act 1963; Finance Act 1965; Finance Act 1966; Finance Act 1967; National Loans Act 1968; Decimal Currency Act 1969; Finance Act 1969; Income and Corporation Taxes Act 1970; National Debt Act 1972; Northern Ireland Constitution Act 1973; Finance Act 1973; Finance Act 1974; Statute Law (Repeals) Act 1975; Finance Act 1975; Statute Law (Repeals) Act 1976; Land Drainage Act 1976; Customs and Excise Management Act 1979; Alcoholic Liquor Duties Act 1979; Matches and Mechanical Lighters Duties Act 1979; Finance Act 1984; Finance Act 1985; Statute Law (Repeals) Act 1986; Finance Act 1986; Finance Act 1987; Statute Law (Repeals) Act 1989; Finance Act 1990; Charities Act 1992; Charities Act 1993; Finance (No. 2) Act 1997; Finance Act 1999; Statute Law (Repeals) Act 2008

Status: Partially repealed

Text of statute as originally enacted

Revised text of statute as amended

The Finance Act 1963 (c. 25) abolished Schedule A of income tax, which was a tax on the imputed rent of owner-occupiers. It also abolished the land tax.

=== Finance Act 1965 ===
The Finance Act 1965 (c. 25) introduced corporation tax and capital gains tax.

=== Finance Act 1972 ===
Finance Act 1972 (Note: Section 134(1).)
- Act of Parliament
- Parliament of the United Kingdom
- Long title: An Act to grant certain duties, to alter other duties, and to amend the law relating to the National Debt and the Public Revenue, and to make further provision in connection with Finance.
- Citation: 1972 c. 41
- Territorial extent: United Kingdom

Dates
- Royal assent: 27 July 1972
- Commencement: 27 July 1972 (Note: Section 47.)
Other legislation
Amends	Bank Charter Act 1844
Repeals/revokes	Purchase Tax Act 1963; Selective Employment Payments Act 1966
Amended by	House of Commons Disqualification Act 1975; Northern Ireland Assembly Disqualification Act 1975; Finance (No. 2) Act 1975; Customs and Excise Management Act 1979; Customs and Excise Duties (General Reliefs) Act 1979; Alcoholic Liquor Duties Act 1979; Hydrocarbon Oil Duties Act 1979; Capital Gains Tax Act 1979; Law Reform (Miscellaneous Provisions) (Scotland) Act 1980; Betting and Gaming Duties Act 1981; Trustee Savings Banks Act 1981; Car Tax Act 1983; Medical Act 1983; Value Added Tax Act 1983; Statute Law (Repeals) Act 1986; Income and Corporation Taxes Act 1988; Capital Allowances Act 1990

Status: Amended

Text of statute as originally enacted

Revised text of statute as amended

The Finance Act 1972 (c. 41) introduced value added tax.

=== Finance Act 1977 ===
Finance Act 1977 (Note: Section 59(1).)
- Act of Parliament
- Parliament of the United Kingdom
- Long title: An Act to grant certain duties, to alter other duties, and to amend the law relating to the National Debt and the Public Revenue, and to make further provision in connection with Finance.
- Citation: 1977 c. 36
- Territorial extent: United Kingdom

Dates
- Royal assent: 29 July 1977
- Commencement: 29 July 1977
Other legislation
Amends	Tithe Act 1936; Tithe Act 1951; Land Charges Act 1972
Amended by	Customs and Excise Management Act 1979; Customs and Excise Duties (General Reliefs) Act 1979; Alcoholic Liquor Duties Act 1979; Capital Gains Tax Act 1979; Finance Act 1984; Inheritance Tax Act 1984; Finance Act 1985; Finance Act 1987; Income and Corporation Taxes Act 1988; Taxation of Chargeable Gains Act 1992; Statute Law (Repeals) Act 2004

Status: Amended

Text of statute as originally enacted

Revised text of statute as amended

The Finance Act 1977 (c. 36) abolished the last remaining tithes payable to the Church of England or Church in Wales.

=== Finance Act 2000 ===
The Finance Act 2000 (c. 17) increased the Climate Change Levy.

=== Finance Act 2010 ===
Shortly before the 2010 United Kingdom general election, (Note: Passed on 8 April 2010) the Finance Act 2010 (c. 13) passed as set out by the Labour Party adjusted the rates of the main taxes, in particular introducing on income tax the 50% 'additional rate' band.

The act also reversed a prospective rise enacted in the Finance Act 2007 (c. 11) of the inheritance tax nil rate band threshold from £325,000 to £350,000 which would have applied from 6 April 2010, thus, emphasising a degree of redistribution, the tax instead continues to apply to death estates that do not benefit from any exemptions (such as spouse nil-rate-bands) and consist of a property valued at 25% above the national average. (Note: The Coalition Government maintained this rate and threshold throughout 2010-2015)

=== Finance (No. 2) Act 2010 ===
The Finance (No. 2) Act 2010 (c. 31) under the Coalition Government reduced the headline rate of Capital Gains Tax to 18%.

The act increased the general rate of VAT from 17.5% to 20% (while cutting it for imported goods and materials from 28.58% to 25%).

=== Finance (No. 3) Act 2010 ===
Finance (No. 3) Act 2010 (Note: Section 33.)
- Act of Parliament
- Parliament of the United Kingdom
- Long title: An Act to grant certain duties, to alter other duties, and to amend the law relating to the National Debt and the Public Revenue, and to make further provision in connection with finance.
- Citation: 2010 c. 33
- Territorial extent: United Kingdom

Dates
- Royal assent: 16 December 2010
- Commencement: 16 December 2010 (Note: Section 4(b) of the Interpretation Act 1978.)
Other legislation
Amends	Customs and Excise Management Act 1979; Inheritance Tax Act 1984; Value Added Tax Act 1994; Criminal Procedure (Consequential Provisions) (Scotland) Act 1995; Capital Allowances Act 2001

Status: Amended

History of passage through Parliament

Text of statute as originally enacted

Revised text of statute as amended

Enacted on 16 December 2010, the Finance (No. 3) Act 2010 (c. 33) extended foster care relief, extended the applicability of venture capital schemes to companies with a "permanent establishment" in the UK "in financial health", modified the meaning of "distribution" in the Corporation Tax Acts, addressed the income tax treatment of seafarer's income, adjusted treatment of REITs:, modified rules as to EEA/UK consortium claims for group relief, introduced first-year allowances for zero-emission goods vehicles, adjusted for VAT purposes treatment of non-business use of business assets, amended penalties for failure to make payments on time and returns on time, proceduralised recovery of overpaid stamp duty and petroleum revenue tax, modified compliance checks as to excise duties, and clarified the tax treatment of asbestos compensation settlements in relation to the three main taxes.

=== Finance (No. 2) Act 2017 ===
Finance (No. 2) Act 2017 (Note: Section 72.)
- Act of Parliament
- Parliament of the United Kingdom
- Long title: An Act to grant certain duties, to alter other duties, and to amend the law relating to the national debt and the public revenue, and to make further provision in connection with finance.
- Citation: 2017 c. 32
- Territorial extent: United Kingdom

Dates
- Royal assent: 16 November 2017
- Commencement: 16 November 2017

Status: Amended

History of passage through Parliament

Text of statute as originally enacted

Revised text of statute as amended

The Finance (No. 2) Act 2017 (c. 14) was enacted on 16 November 2017. The act implements tax measures laid out in the November 2017 United Kingdom budget.

=== Finance Act 2020 ===
Finance Act 2020 (Note: Section 114.)
- Act of Parliament
- Parliament of the United Kingdom
- Long title: An Act to grant certain duties, to alter other duties, and to amend the law relating to the national debt and the public revenue, and to make further provision in connection with finance.
- Citation: 2020 c. 14
- Territorial extent: United Kingdom

Dates
- Royal assent: 22 July 2020
- Commencement: 22 July 2020
Other legislation
Amends	Stamp Act 1891; Inheritance Tax Act 1984; Value Added Tax Act 1994; Capital Allowances Act 2001; Bankruptcy (Scotland) Act 2016

Status: Amended

History of passage through Parliament

Text of statute as originally enacted

Revised text of statute as amended

The Finance Act 2020 (c. 14) was enacted on 22 July 2020. Part 2 provides for the introduction of a Digital Services Tax.

== Full title of the act including preamble and enacting formula ==
An Act to grant certain duties, to alter other duties, and to amend the law relating to the National Debt and the Public Revenue, and to make further provision in connection with finance.

Most Gracious Sovereign

We, Your Majesty's most dutiful and loyal subjects, the Commons of the United Kingdom in Parliament assembled, towards raising the necessary supplies to defray Your Majesty's public expenses, and making an addition to the public revenue, have freely and voluntarily resolved to give and grant unto Your Majesty the several duties hereinafter mentioned; and do therefore most humbly beseech Your Majesty that it may be it enacted, and be it enacted by the King's Most Excellent Majesty, by and with the advice and consent of the Lords Spiritual and Temporal, and Commons, in this present Parliament assembled, and by the authority of the same, as follows...

== See also ==
- Economic history of the United Kingdom
- History of the English fiscal system
- List of short titles
