= Alcoholic Liquor Duties Act 1979 =

Act of the Parliament of the United Kingdom

Alcoholic Liquor Duties Act 1979 (Note: Section 93(1).)
- Act of Parliament
- Parliament of the United Kingdom
- Long title: An Act to consolidate the enactments relating to the excise duties on spirits, beer, wine, made-wine and cider together with certain other enactments relating to excise.
- Citation: 1979 c. 4
- Territorial extent: United Kingdom

Dates
- Royal assent: 22 February 1979
- Commencement: 1 April 1979 (Note: Section 93(2).)
- Repealed: 1 August 2023 (Note: The Finance (No. 2) Act 2023, Part 2 (Alcohol Duty) (Appointed Day, Savings, Consequential Amendments and Transitional Provisions) Regulations 2023 (SI 2023/884).)

Other legislation
- Amends: See § Repealed enactments
- Repeals/revokes: See § Repealed enactments
- Amended by: Finance Act 2015; Sentencing Act 2020
- Repealed by: Finance (No. 2) Act 2023

Status: Repealed

Text of statute as originally enacted

Revised text of statute as amended

The Alcoholic Liquor Duties Act 1979 (c. 4) was an act of the Parliament of the United Kingdom that consolidated enactments relating to the excise duties on spirits, beer, wine, made-wine and cider in the United Kingdom.

== Provisions ==
=== Repealed enactments ===
Section 92(2) of the act repealed 25 enactments and revoked 1 instrument, listed in parts I and II, and part III, of schedule 4 to the act, respectively.

Part I – Enactments of the Parliament of the United Kingdom
Citation	Short title	Extent of repeal
53 & 54 Vict. c. 8	Customs and Inland Revenue Act 1890	Section 31(2).
15 & 16 Geo. 6 & 1 Eliz. 2. c. 44	Customs and Excise Act 1952	Part IV.
15 & 16 Geo. 6 & 1 Eliz. 2. c. 44	Customs and Excise Act 1952	Sections 226 to 228.
15 & 16 Geo. 6 & 1 Eliz. 2. c. 44	Customs and Excise Act 1952	Section 237.
15 & 16 Geo. 6 & 1 Eliz. 2. c. 44	Customs and Excise Act 1952	Sections 241 to 243.
15 & 16 Geo. 6 & 1 Eliz. 2. c. 44	Customs and Excise Act 1952	Section 263(3) to (5).
15 & 16 Geo. 6 & 1 Eliz. 2. c. 44	Customs and Excise Act 1952	In section 307(1), the definitions of "authorised methylator", "beer", "beer-primer", "brewer" and "brewer for sale", "British compounded spirits", "British spirits", "case", "cider", "compounder", "dealer", "distiller" and "distillery", "distiller's warehouse", "gravity" and "original gravity", "intoxicating liquor", "justices' licence" and "justices' on-licence", "licensed methylator", "limited licence to brew beer", "made-wine", "methylated spirits", "producer of wine", "producer of made-wine", "proof", "rectifier", "registered club", "retail", "retailer", "spirits", "spirits of wine", "wholesale" and "wine".
15 & 16 Geo. 6 & 1 Eliz. 2. c. 44	Customs and Excise Act 1952	In section 315, paragraphs (c) and (d).
15 & 16 Geo. 6 & 1 Eliz. 2. c. 44	Customs and Excise Act 1952	In Schedule 10, paragraph 15.
1 & 2 Eliz. 2. c. 34	Finance Act 1953	Section 2.
6 & 7 Eliz. 2. c. 56	Finance Act 1958	Section 6.
7 & 8 Eliz. 2. c. 58	Finance Act 1959	Section 2(1) and (5).
7 & 8 Eliz. 2. c. 58	Finance Act 1959	Section 3(2), (3), (4) and (5).
8 & 9 Eliz. 2. c. 44	Finance Act 1960	Section 3.
8 & 9 Eliz. 2. c. 44	Finance Act 1960	Schedule 1.
1963 c. 25	Finance Act 1963	Section 6.
1963 c. 25	Finance Act 1963	Schedule 2.
1963 c. 31	Weights and Measures Act 1963	Section 59.
1963 c. 31	Weights and Measures Act 1963	In Schedule 10, paragraph 1(d).
1964 c. 49	Finance Act 1964	Section 1(5).
1964 c. 49	Finance Act 1964	Section 2(5) and (6).
1966 c. 18	Finance Act 1966	In Schedule 2, in paragraph 1, the words from "section 107(1)" to "spirits)" and paragraph 2.
1967 c. 54	Finance Act 1967	Section 1(5).
1967 c. 54	Finance Act 1967	Section 4 except, in subsection (5), paragraphs (a)(i) and (v).
1967 c. 54	Finance Act 1967	Section 6.
1967 c. 54	Finance Act 1967	In Schedule 5, paragraphs 2, 3 and 4.
1967 c. 54	Finance Act 1967	In Schedule 6, paragraphs 1, 3, 4, 7, 8, 9, 10 and 11.
1967 c. 54	Finance Act 1967	In Schedule 9, paragraphs 1 to 6.
1968 c. 44	Finance Act 1968	Section 1(3).
1968 c. 54	Theatres Act 1968	In Schedule 2 the amendment in section 162 of the Customs and Excise Act 1952.
1969 c. 32	Finance Act 1969	Section 1(5)(b).
1969 c. 32	Finance Act 1969	In Schedule 7, paragraph 2.
1970 c. 24	Finance Act 1970	Section 6(1) and (2)(a).
1970 c. 24	Finance Act 1970	Section 7, except subsections (5) and (8).
1972 c. 41	Finance Act 1972	Section 57(3) and (4).
1974 c. 30	Finance Act 1974	Section 4.
1975 c. 45	Finance (No. 2) Act 1975	Sections 9 and 10.
1975 c. 45	Finance (No. 2) Act 1975	Sections 14 and 15.
1975 c. 45	Finance (No. 2) Act 1975	In Schedule 3, paragraphs 3 to 7, 9, 15, 24 to 37. 42, in paragraph 44, subparagraphs (a), (b) and (d) and paragraphs 45 to 47.
1975 c. 45	Finance (No. 2) Act 1975	Schedules 4 and 5.
1975 c. 45	Finance (No. 2) Act 1975	In Schedule 6, paragraphs 5, 6, 7 and 8.
1976 c. 40	Finance Act 1976	Sections 2 and 3.
1976 c. 40	Finance Act 1976	In Schedule 3, paragraphs 1, 5, 7 and 9.
1976 c. 66	Licensing (Scotland) Act 1976	In Schedule 7, paragraphs 3 and 4.
1977 c. 36	Finance Act 1977	Section 1(1) to (5), (8) and (9).
1977 c. 36	Finance Act 1977	Schedules 1 and 2.
1978 c. 42	Finance Act 1978	Section 2.
1978 c. 42	Finance Act 1978	In Schedule 12, paragraphs 1 to 5.

Part II – Enactments of the Parliament of Northern Ireland
Citation	Short title	Extent of repeal
1959 c. 9 (N.I.)	Finance Act (Northern Ireland) 1959	Section 12(1) and (5).
1959 c. 9 (N.I.)	Finance Act (Northern Ireland) 1959	Section 13(2) to (5).
1959 c. 9 (N.I.)	Finance Act (Northern Ireland) 1959	Section 18(5).
1963 c. 22 (N.I.)	Finance Act (Northern Ireland) 1963	Section 19.
1963 c. 22 (N.I.)	Finance Act (Northern Ireland) 1963	Section 22(6).
1963 c. 22 (N.I.)	Finance Act (Northern Ireland) 1963	Schedule 2.
1967 c. 20 (N.I.)	Finance Act (Northern Ireland) 1967	Section 15(1)(b) and (6).
1967 c. 20 (N.I.)	Finance Act (Northern Ireland) 1967	Section 17.
1967 c. 20 (N.I.)	Finance Act (Northern Ireland) 1967	Section 21(6).
1967 c. 20 (N.I.)	Finance Act (Northern Ireland) 1967	In Schedule 2, the amendment in the Finance Act (Northern Ireland) 1959.

Part III – Northern Ireland Instrument
Citation	Title	Extent of revocation
SI 1976/1214 (N.I. 23)	Poisons (Northern Ireland) Order 1976	In Schedule 2, paragraph 1.

== Subsequent developments ==
The whole act was repealed by section 113(1) of the Finance (No. 2) Act 2023, which came into force on 1 August 2023.
