= Capital Gains Tax Act 1979 =

Act of the Parliament of the United Kingdom

Capital Gains Tax Act 1979 (Note: Section 160.)
- Act of Parliament
- Parliament of the United Kingdom
- Long title: An Act to consolidate Part III of the Finance Act 1965 with related provisions in that Act and subsequent Acts.
- Citation: 1979 c. 14
- Territorial extent: United Kingdom

Dates
- Royal assent: 22 March 1979
- Commencement: 6 April 1979 (Note: Section 156(2).)
- Repealed: 6 March 1992

Other legislation
- Amends: See § Repealed enactments
- Repeals/revokes: See § Repealed enactments
- Amended by: Inheritance Tax Act 1984; Income and Corporation Taxes Act 1988; Capital Allowances Act 1990
- Repealed by: Taxation of Chargeable Gains Act 1992

Status: Repealed

Text of statute as originally enacted

Revised text of statute as amended

The Capital Gains Tax Act 1979 (c. 14) was an act of the Parliament of the United Kingdom that consolidated enactments relating to capital gains tax in the United Kingdom.

== Provisions ==
=== Repealed enactments ===
Section 158(1) of the act repealed 17 enactments and revoked 25 instruments, listed in schedule 8 to the act.

Enactments repealed by section 158(1)
Citation	Short title	Extent of repeal
1965 c. 25	Finance Act 1965	Part III, except section 45(12).
1965 c. 25	Finance Act 1965	Section 94.
1965 c. 25	Finance Act 1965	Schedules 6 to 9.
1965 c. 25	Finance Act 1965	Schedule 10, except paragraph 15.
1966 c. 18	Finance Act 1966	Section 43.
1966 c. 18	Finance Act 1966	Schedule 10.
1967 c. 54	Finance Act 1967	Section 32.
1967 c. 54	Finance Act 1967	Section 35.
1967 c. 54	Finance Act 1967	Section 37.
1967 c. 54	Finance Act 1967	Section 45(3)(h).
1967 c. 54	Finance Act 1967	Schedule 13.
1968 c. 44	Finance Act 1968	Section 32.
1968 c. 44	Finance Act 1968	Section 34.
1968 c. 44	Finance Act 1968	Section 61(5).
1968 c. 44	Finance Act 1968	Schedules 11 and 12.
1969 c. 32	Finance Act 1969	Sections 41 and 42.
1969 c. 32	Finance Act 1969	Section 61(3)(e).
1969 c. 32	Finance Act 1969	Schedules 18 and 19.
1970 c. 9	Taxes Management Act 1970	Section 47(4).
1970 c. 9	Taxes Management Act 1970	In section 57(3)(c) the words "or under any provision in the Finance Act 1965 ".
1970 c. 10	Income and Corporation Taxes Act 1970	In Schedule 15—paragraphs 6 and 7; in Part I of the Table in paragraph 11 the entries amending the Finance Act 1965; in Part II of that Table the entries amending—the Finance Act 1965 (except section 93), the Finance Act 1967, the Finance Act 1968, Schedules 18 and 19 to the Finance Act 1969; paragraph 12(1).
1970 c. 24	Finance Act 1970	In section 28(1) the words from "section 41 " to "1969 and of ".
1971 c. 68	Finance Act 1971	Section 55, except subsection (5).
1971 c. 68	Finance Act 1971	Section 56.
1971 c. 68	Finance Act 1971	Sections 58 to 60.
1971 c. 68	Finance Act 1971	In section 69(3) the words from "Part IV " to the end of the subsection.
1971 c. 68	Finance Act 1971	In Schedule 3 paragraph 10.
1971 c. 68	Finance Act 1971	In Schedule 6 paragraph 91.
1971 c. 68	Finance Act 1971	In Schedule 8 paragraph 16(1).
1971 c. 68	Finance Act 1971	Schedule 9, except paragraph 4.
1971 c. 68	Finance Act 1971	Schedule 10.
1971 c. 68	Finance Act 1971	Schedule 12.
1972 c. 41	Finance Act 1972	Sections 112 to 119.
1972 c. 41	Finance Act 1972	In section 124(2) the words "or gains " before paragraph (a), and in paragraph (a) the words "or gains " (in three places) and the words " or section 40(1) of the Finance Act 1965.".
1972 c. 41	Finance Act 1972	Section 134(3)(c).
1972 c. 41	Finance Act 1972	In Schedule 24 paragraphs 1 and 2.
1973 c. 51	Finance Act 1973	Section 37.
1973 c. 51	Finance Act 1973	Section 51.
1973 c. 51	Finance Act 1973	In section 54(1) the words "capital gains tax ".
1973 c. 51	Finance Act 1973	In Schedule 16 paragraph 15.
1973 c. 51	Finance Act 1973	Schedule 20.
1973 c. 51	Finance Act 1973	In Schedule 21 paragraph 4.
1974 c. 30	Finance Act 1974	Section 8(8).
1974 c. 30	Finance Act 1974	Sections 31 to 33.
1974 c. 30	Finance Act 1974	Section 48.
1974 c. 30	Finance Act 1974	In section 57(3)(b) the words from "and so far " to the end of the paragraph.
1974 c. 30	Finance Act 1974	In Schedule 8 paragraph 6.
1975 c. 7	Finance Act 1975	Section 53.
1975 c. 7	Finance Act 1975	In Schedule 12 paragraphs 12, 13 and 17.
1975 c. 45	Finance (No. 2) Act 1975	Section 44(4).
1975 c. 45	Finance (No. 2) Act 1975	Section 57.
1975 c. 45	Finance (No. 2) Act 1975	Sections 59 to 64.
1975 c. 45	Finance (No. 2) Act 1975	In section 75(3)(c) the words from "and so far " to the end of the paragraph.
1975 c. 45	Finance (No. 2) Act 1975	In Schedule 8 paragraph 5.
1976 c. 40	Finance Act 1976	Sections 52 and 53.
1976 c. 40	Finance Act 1976	Sections 55 and 56.
1976 c. 40	Finance Act 1976	In Schedule 11 paragraphs 1 and 6.
1977 c. 36	Finance Act 1977	Section 40.
1977 c. 36	Finance Act 1977	Section 43.
1977 c. 36	Finance Act 1977	In section 59(3)(c) the words from "and, so far " to the end of the paragraph.
1978 c. 42	Finance Act 1978	Section 44.
1978 c. 42	Finance Act 1978	In section 45 subsections (1) to (4), and in subsection (6) the words from "and subsections (2)" to the end of the subsection.
1978 c. 42	Finance Act 1978	Sections 46 to 52.
1978 c. 42	Finance Act 1978	In section 80(3)(c) the words from "and so far " to the end of the paragraph.
1978 c. 42	Finance Act 1978	Schedules 7 and 8.
1978 c. 42	Finance Act 1978	In Schedule 11 paragraph 2.

Statutory instruments revoked by section 158(1)
Citation	Title	Extent of revocation
SI 1970/173	Capital Gains Tax (Exempt Gilt-edged Securities) Order 1970	The whole order.
SI 1970/1741	Capital Gains Tax (Exempt Gilt-edged Securities) (No. 2) Order 1970	The whole order.
SI 1971/793	Capital Gains Tax (Exempt Gilt-edged Securities) Order 1971	The whole order.
SI 1971/1366	Capital Gains Tax (Exempt Gilt-edged Securities) (No. 2) Order 1971	The whole order.
SI 1971/1786	Capital Gains Tax (Exempt Gilt-edged Securities) (No. 3) Order 1971	The whole order.
SI 1972/244	Capital Gains Tax (Exempt Gilt-edged Securities) Order 1972	The whole order.
SI 1972/1015	Capital Gains Tax (Exempt Gilt-edged Securities) (No. 2) Order 1972	The whole order.
SI 1973/241	Capital Gains Tax (Exempt Gilt-edged Securities) Order 1973	The whole order.
SI 1973/716	Capital Gains Tax (Exempt Gilt-edged Securities) (No. 2) Order 1973	The whole order.
SI 1973/1769	Capital Gains Tax (Exempt Gilt-edged Securities) (No. 3) Order 1973	The whole order.
SI 1974/693	Capital Gains Tax (Exempt Gilt-edged Securities) Order 1974	The whole order.
SI 1974/1071	Capital Gains Tax (Exempt Gilt-edged Securities) (No. 2) Order 1974	The whole order.
SI 1974/1907	Capital Gains Tax (Exempt Gilt-edged Securities) (No. 3) Order 1974	The whole order.
SI 1975/354	Capital Gains Tax (Exempt Gilt-edged Securities) Order 1975	The whole order.
SI 1975/1129	Capital Gains Tax (Exempt Gilt-edged Securities) (No. 2) Order 1975	The whole order.
SI 1975/1757	Capital Gains Tax (Exempt Gilt-edged Securities) (No. 3) Order 1975	The whole order.
SI 1976/698	Capital Gains Tax (Exempt Gilt-edged Securities) (No. 1) Order 1976	The whole order.
SI 1976/1859	Capital Gains Tax (Exempt Gilt-edged Securities) (No. 2) Order 1976	The whole order.
SI 1977/347	Capital Gains Tax (Exempt Gilt-edged Securities) (No. 1) Order 1977	The whole order.
SI 1977/919	Capital Gains Tax (Exempt Gilt-edged Securities) (No. 2) Order 1977	The whole order.
SI 1977/1136	Capital Gains Tax (Exempt Gilt-edged Securities) (No. 3) Order 1977	The whole order.
SI 1977/1614	Capital Gains Tax (Exempt Gilt-edged Securities) (No. 4) Order 1977	The whole order.
SI 1978/141	Capital Gains Tax (Exempt Gilt-edged Securities) (No. 1) Order 1978	The whole order.
SI 1978/1312	Capital Gains Tax (Exempt Gilt-edged Securities) (No. 2) Order 1978	The whole order.
SI 1978/1838	Capital Gains Tax (Exempt Gilt-edged Securities) (No. 3) Order 1978	The whole order.

== Subsequent developments ==
The whole act was repealed by section 290(3) of, and schedule 12 to, the Taxation of Chargeable Gains Act 1992, which came into force on 6 March 1992.
