= Income and Corporation Taxes Act =

Income and Corporation Taxes Act may refer to:

- Income and Corporation Taxes Act 1970, an Act of the Parliament of the United Kingdom
- Income and Corporation Taxes Act 1988, an Act of the Parliament of the United Kingdom
