= Income Tax Act 1952 =

Act of the Parliament of the United Kingdom

Income Tax Act 1952 (Note: Section 532.)
- Act of Parliament
- Parliament of the United Kingdom
- Long title: An Act to consolidate certain of the enactments relating to income tax, including certain enactments relating also to other taxes.
- Citation: 15 & 16 Geo. 6 & 1 Eliz. 2. c. 10
- Territorial extent: United Kingdom

Dates
- Royal assent: 28 February 1952
- Commencement: 6 April 1952 (Note: Section 527(1).)
- Repealed: 31 January 2013
Other legislation
Amends	Capital Allowances Act 1968; See § Repealed enactments
Repeals/revokes	See § Repealed enactments
Amended by	Ghana Independence Act 1957; Federation of Malaya Independence Act 1957; Statute Law Revision Act 1964; Science and Technology Act 1965; Singapore Act 1966; National Loans Act 1968; Theft Act 1968; Finance Act 1969
Repealed by	Income and Corporation Taxes Act 1970; Statute Law (Repeals) Act 2013

Status: Repealed

Text of statute as originally enacted

The Income Tax Act 1952 (15 & 16 Geo. 6 & 1 Eliz. 2. c. 10) was an act of the Parliament of the United Kingdom, concerning income tax.

The whole act was repealed by section 538(1) of, and schedule 16 to, the Income and Corporation Taxes Act 1970 (1970 c. 10), which came into force on 6 April 1970.

== Provisions ==
The act consolidated all legislation since 1918 concerning income tax, including Finance Acts.

The act retained the A-E schedular structure that had existed previously.

=== Repealed enactments ===
Section 527(1) of the act repealed 62 enactments, listed in parts I, II and III of the twenty-fifth schedule to the act.

Part I - the Parliament of the United Kingdom
Citation	Short title	Extent of repeal
8 & 9 Geo. 5. c. 40	Income Tax Act 1918	The whole act.
9 & 10 Geo. 5. c. 32	Finance Act 1919	Part II.
10 & 11 Geo. 5. c. 18	Finance Act 1920	Part II. Section sixty-one, so far as it relates to income tax. The Third Schedule.
11 & 12 Geo. 5. c. 32	Finance Act 1921	Part II. In the Second Schedule, paragraph 7 of Part IV.
12 & 13 Geo. 5. c. 17	Finance Act 1922	Part II. The First Schedule.
13 & 14 Geo. 5. c. 14	Finance Act 1923	Part II.
14 & 15 Geo. 5. c. 21	Finance Act 1924	Part I.
15 & 16 Geo. 5. c. 36	Finance Act 1925	Part II. Section twenty-six.
16 & 17 Geo. 5. c. 22	Finance Act 1926	Parts III and IV. The Second, Third and Fourth Schedules.
17 & 18 Geo. 5. c. 10	Finance Act 1927	Parts I and II. The Fifth Schedule.
18 & 19 Geo. 5. c. 17	Finance Act 1928	Part I. Subsection (1) of section thirty. The Fourth Schedule.
19 & 20 Geo. 5. c. 25	Local Government (Scotland) Act 1929	Subsection (4) of section two.
20 & 21 Geo. 5. c. 28	Finance Act 1930	Part I. The First Schedule.
21 & 22 Geo. 5. c. 28	Finance Act 1931	Part II. Section thirty-seven, so far as it relates to income tax.
21 & 22 Geo. 5. c. 49	Finance (No. 2) Act 1931	Part II. Section sixteen. Subsection (2) of section twenty-two. Section twenty-three. The Third and Fourth Schedules.
22 & 23 Geo. 5. c. 25	Finance Act 1932	Part II.
23 & 24 Geo. 5. c. 19	Finance Act 1933	Part II.
24 & 25 Geo. 5. c. 32	Finance Act 1934	Part II.
25 & 26 Geo. 5. c. 24	Finance Act 1935	Part II.
26 Geo. 5 & 1 Edw. 8. c. 2	Government of India Act 1935	In subsection (5) of section two hundred and seventy-three, from the beginning to the words "United Kingdom, and".
26 Geo. 5 & 1 Edw. 8. c. 34	Finance Act 1936	Part II. The Second Schedule.
26 Geo. 5 & 1 Edw. 8. c. 43	Tithe Act 1936	Subsections (5) and (6) of section thirteen.
1 Edw. 8 & 1 Geo. 6. c. 54	Finance Act 1937	Part II. Section twenty-five. The Third Schedule.
1 & 2 Geo. 6. c. 46	Finance Act 1938	Parts II, III and IV. The Third Schedule.
2 & 3 Geo. 6. c. 41	Finance Act 1939	Part I.
2 & 3 Geo. 6. c. 49	House of Commons Members' Fund Act 1939	Subsections (4) and (5) of section one.
2 & 3 Geo. 6. c. 109	Finance (No. 2) Act 1939	Part I. Subsection (1) of section eighteen. The Sixth Schedule.
2 & 3 Geo. 6. c. 117	National Loans Act 1939	Paragraph 4 of the Second Schedule.
3 & 4 Geo. 6. c. 29	Finance Act 1940	Part I. Subsection (2) of section sixty. Paragraph 9 of Part IV of the Fifth Schedule.
3 & 4 Geo. 6. c. 48	Finance (No. 2) Act 1940	Part II. The Fifth Schedule.
4 & 5 Geo. 6. c. 30	Finance Act 1941	Part II. Section forty-seven. The First Schedule.
5 & 6 Geo. 6. c. 21	Finance Act 1942	Part III. In section forty-two, the words "income tax and". Part I of the Tenth Schedule.
6 & 7 Geo. 6. c. 28	Finance Act 1943	Part II. Subsection (2) of section twenty-eight. The Sixth Schedule.
6 & 7 Geo. 6. c. 45	Income Tax (Employments) Act 1943	The whole act.
7 & 8 Geo. 6. c. 12	Income Tax (Offices and Employments) Act 1944	The whole act.
7 & 8 Geo. 6. c. 23	Finance Act 1944	Parts III and IV.
8 & 9 Geo. 6. c. 24	Finance Act 1945	Sections three and four.
8 & 9 Geo. 6. c. 32	Income Tax Act 1945	The whole act.
9 & 10 Geo. 6. c. 13	Finance (No. 2) Act 1945	Part II. Part IV, so far as it relates to income tax.
9 & 10 Geo. 6. c. 27	Bank of England Act 1946	Part V, except subsection (3) of section fifty-one, section fifty-four, and, so far as they relate to estate duty, subsection (1) of section fifty-five and section fifty-six.
9 & 10 Geo. 6. c. 59	Coal Industry Nationalisation Act 1946	Sections fifty-eight and fifty-nine, so far as they relate to income tax. In subsection (1) of section sixty, the words "collectors of taxes and" (in both places) and the words "income tax and". The Fourth Schedule. The Sixth and Eighth Schedules, so far as they relate to income tax. In the Ninth Schedule, paragraphs 1 and 2 so far as they relate to income tax, and paragraph 3.
9 & 10 Geo. 6. c. 62	National Insurance (Industrial Injuries) Act 1946	In paragraph 10 of the First Schedule, the figure "4".
9 & 10 Geo. 6. c. 64	Finance Act 1946	In subsection (8) of section thirty-three, the figure "4". Subsection (6) of section eighty-three.
9 & 10 Geo. 6. c. 67	National Insurance Act 1946	Part III. Section fifty-eight, so far as it relates to income tax. Sections fifty-nine to sixty-one. In section sixty-two, subsections (1), (4) and (5). The Sixth Schedule. In the Eleventh Schedule, so much of Part IV as amends section thirty-three of the Finance Act, 1921.
9 & 10 Geo. 6. c. 82	Cable and Wireless Act 1946	In paragraph 6 of the Second Schedule, the figure "4".
10 & 11 Geo. 6. c. 35	Finance Act 1947	Part III. Sections sixty-six and sixty-seven. The Seventh, Ninth and Tenth Schedules.
10 & 11 Geo. 6. c. 51	Town and Country Planning Act 1947	In subsection (8) of section sixty-six, the figure "4".
10 & 11 Geo. 6. c. 53	Town and Country Planning (Scotland) Act 1947	In subsection (8) of section sixty-three, the figure "4".
11 & 12 Geo. 6. c. 7	Ceylon Independence Act 1947	Paragraph 3 of the Second Schedule.
11 & 12 Geo. 6. c. 9	Finance (No. 2) Act 1947	In section eight, in subsection (1), the words "to income tax made under Schedule D, or any assessment to surtax"; in subsection (4), the words "year of assessment or", the words "year or", the words "to surtax or", the words "surtax or" (in the second place where these words occur), the words "as the case may be", the word "or" at the end of paragraph (b) and the whole of paragraph (c); in subsection (5), the words "years of assessment or".
11 & 12 Geo. 6. c. 49	Finance Act 1948	Parts III and IV. In subsection (1) of section seventy-nine, the words "the Income Tax Acts and" and the words "income tax and". The Ninth Schedule.
12, 13 & 14 Geo. 6. c. 44	Superannuation Act 1949	Section forty-nine.
12, 13 & 14 Geo. 6. c. 47	Finance Act 1949	Part II. Section fifty. In subsection (1) of section fifty-one, the words "income tax other than surtax, surtax". The Sixth and Tenth Schedules.
12, 13 & 14 Geo. 6. c. 99	Married Women (Maintenance) Act 1949	Section three.
14 Geo. 6. c. 15	Finance Act 1950	Part I. Section thirty-six. Section thirty-seven, so far as it relates to income tax. In section thirty-eight, in subsection (1), the words "income tax and", and the whole of subsection (3). Section forty-one, so far as it relates to income tax carrying interest. Section forty-two. The Sixth Schedule.
14 & 15 Geo. 6. c. 11	Administration of Justice (Pensions) Act 1950	Section eighteen.
14 & 15 Geo. 6. c. 43	Finance Act 1951	Part II. Sections thirty-six to thirty-eight. Section forty-one.
14 & 15 Geo. 6. c. 56	Guardianship and Maintenance of Infants Act 1951	Section three.

Part II - the Parliament of Northern Ireland
Citation	Short title	Extent of repeal
1946 c. 21 (N.I.)	National Insurance (Industrial Injuries) Act (Northern Ireland) 1946	Subsection (6) of section eighty-two.
1946 c. 23 (N.I.)	National Insurance Act (Northern Ireland) 1946	Subsection (6) of section twenty-six.

Part III - Orders in Council
Citation	Short title	Extent of repeal
SR&O 1922 No. 80	Government of Ireland (Adaptation of the Taxing Acts) Order 1922	Part VI.
SR&O 1923 No. 453	Irish Free State (Consequential Adaptation of Taxing Acts) Order 1923	In paragraph (2) of Article 1, the definitions of "Government Stock" and "dividends". Articles 4, 5, 6 and 7.

== See also ==
- Taxation in the United Kingdom

== Bibliography ==
- Butterworths' Legal Editorial Staff. Handbook on the Income Tax Act, 1952. (Simon's Income Tax). Butterworth & Co (Publishers) Ltd. London. 1952. Reviewed at "Reviews" in "Law Library" (1952) 213 The Law Times 206 (10 April 1952); "Legal Literature" (1952) 102 The Law Journal 250 (2 May 1952); "Reviews" (1952) 116 Justice of the Peace and Local Government Review 474 (26 July 1952); (1952) 86 The Irish Law Times 222 (13 September 1952)
- H G S Plunkett (ed). The Income Tax Act, 1952, Annotated. Sweet & Maxwell. Stevens & Sons. London. W Green & Son. Edinburgh. Carswell Company. Toronto. 1952. Reviewed at "Literature" in "The Pleader" (1952) 68 Scottish Law Review and Sheriff Court Reports 189 ; "Reviews and Notices" (1952) 30 The Canadian Bar Review 543.
- N E Mustoe. Guide to Income Tax. Butterworth & Co (Publishers) Ltd. 1952. Reviewed at (1952) 96 The Solicitors' Journal 409 (28 June 1952); "Law Library" (1952) 214 The Law Times 77 (8 August 1952)
- "The Income Tax Act 1952". Halsbury's Statutes of England. Second Edition. Butterworth & Co (Publishers) Ltd. Bell Yard, Temple Bar, London. 1952. Volume 31 (The Income Tax Act 1952). Passim.
- John Burke (ed). "Income Tax Act, 1952". Current Law Statutes Annotated 1952. Sweet & Maxwell. Stevens & Sons. London. W Green & Son. Edinburgh. 1952. Chapter 10. Google
- Current Law Income Tax Acts Service (CLITAS). Sweet & Maxwell. Stevens & Sons. London. W Green & Son. Edinburgh. Carswell Company. Toronto. 1952. (looseleaf). Reviewed at "Legal Literature" (1952) 102 The Law Journal 501 (5 September 1952)
- A C Monahan. A Comprehensive Index to the Income Tax Act, 1952. Solicitors Law Stationery Society Ltd. London. 1952. Reviewed at (1952) 86 The Irish Law Times 222 (13 September 1952); Accountancy, vols 63 & 64, p 176
- John Gilbert (comp). Index to Income Tax Act, 1952. Barkeley Book Company Ltd. Stanmore. Reviewed at Accountancy, vols 63 & 64, p 209; (1952) 127 The Accountant 131 (2 August 1952)
- Taxation. Volumes 63 to 65 and 66 (1960). Passim. See also other volumes of this periodical.
- "The Income Tax Act, 1952" (1952) 19 The Solicitor 114 (May 1952)
- "Income Tax Act, 1952" (1952) 214 The Law Times 139 (12 September 1952)
- "Income Tax Act, 1952, 15 & 16 Geo. 6 & 1 Eliz. 2, c. 10" (1952) 102 The Law Journal 161 (21 March 1952)
- Beattie. The Elements of Income Tax Law. 2nd Ed. 1953. 3rd Ed. 1957. 4th Ed. 1960. 5th Ed. 1962. The Elements of Income Tax and Profits Tax Law. 6th Ed. Stevens & Sons. 1963. Elements of the Law of Income and Capital Gains Taxation. 7th Ed. 1966. Second impression. 1967. Passim. Reviewed at 9 Journal of the Society of Public Teachers of Law 273.
- "Income Tax and Profits Tax". Halsbury's Laws of England. (The Laws of England). Third Edition. Butterworth & Co (Publishers) Ltd. 1952. Volume 20. Passim.
- The English and Empire Digest. Volume 28. Revised Edition. Title "Income Tax".
- Philip Frederick Skottowe (rev ed). H W Clements and A S Diamond (eds). Butterworths Income Tax Digest: being a Reprint of the Title "Income Tax" from the Revised Edition of Volume 28 of the English and Empire Digest. Butterworths. London. 1960.
