= Capital Allowances Act 1990 =

Act of the Parliament of the United Kingdom

Capital Allowances Act 1990 (Note: Section 165.)
- Act of Parliament
- Parliament of the United Kingdom
- Long title: An Act to consolidate certain enactments relating to capital allowances.
- Citation: 1990 c. 1
- Territorial extent: United Kingdom

Dates
- Royal assent: 19 March 1990
- Commencement: 19 March 1990 (Note: Section 4(b) of the Interpretation Act 1978.)
- Repealed: 1 April 2001 (Note: For corporation tax purposes.); 6 April 2001 (Note: For income tax purposes.)
Other legislation
Amends	See § Repealed enactments
Repeals/revokes	See § Repealed enactments
Amended by	Social Security (Consequential Provisions) Act 1992; Social Security (Consequential Provisions) (Northern Ireland) Act 1992; Taxation of Chargeable Gains Act 1992; Petroleum Act 1998
Repealed by	Capital Allowances Act 2001

Status: Repealed

Text of statute as originally enacted

Revised text of statute as amended

The Capital Allowances Act 1990 (c. 1) was an act of the Parliament of the United Kingdom that consolidated enactments relating to capital allowances in the United Kingdom.

== Provisions ==
=== Repealed enactments ===
Section 164(4) of the act repealed 33 enactments, listed in schedule 2 to the act.

Citation	Short title	Extent of repeal
1968 c. 3	Capital Allowances Act 1968	The whole act.
1968 c. 73	Transport Act 1968	Section 161(1) and (3).
1970 c. 9	Taxes Management Act 1970	In the second column of the Table in section 98, the words "Paragraph 10 of Schedule 16 to the Finance Act 1986".
1970 c. 10	Income and Corporation Taxes Act 1970	Section 306.
1970 c. 10	Income and Corporation Taxes Act 1970	In Schedule 15, paragraph 5, in Part II of the Table in paragraph 11, the entries relating to the Capital Allowances Act 1968, and paragraph 12(2).
1970 c. 24	Finance Act 1970	Section 15.
1970 c. 24	Finance Act 1970	In Schedule 4, paragraph 7.
1971 c. 68	Finance Act 1971	Sections 40 to 54.
1971 c. 68	Finance Act 1971	Schedule 8.
1972 c. 41	Finance Act 1972	Sections 67, 68 and 69.
1974 c. 30	Finance Act 1974	Section 17.
1975 c. 7	Finance Act 1975	Sections 13, 14 and 15.
1975 c. 45	Finance (No.2) Act 1975	Section 49.
1976 c. 40	Finance Act 1976	Sections 39 to 42.
1978 c. 42	Finance Act 1978	Sections 37 to 40.
1978 c. 42	Finance Act 1978	Schedule 6.
1979 c. 14	Capital Gains Tax Act 1979	In section 34, subsection (4)(aa) and, in subsection (6), the words following "earlier event".
1979 c. 47	Finance (No.2) Act 1979	Section 14.
1980 c. 48	Finance Act 1980	Sections 64 to 69.
1980 c. 48	Finance Act 1980	Section 70(3).
1980 c. 48	Finance Act 1980	Sections 71 to 76.
1980 c. 48	Finance Act 1980	Schedules 12 and 13.
1981 c. 35	Finance Act 1981	Sections 73 to 77.
1982 c. 16	Civil Aviation Act 1982	In paragraph 3 of Schedule 3, the words from "the Capital" to "expenditure) and" and from "but no" to the end.
1982 c. 39	Finance Act 1982	Sections 70 to 79.
1982 c. 39	Finance Act 1982	Schedules 11 and 12.
1982 c. 39	Finance Act 1982	Schedule 21.
1982 c. 52	Industrial Development Act 1982	In Schedule 2, paragraph 4.
1983 c. 28	Finance Act 1983	Sections 30 to 33.
1983 c. 49	Finance (No.2) Act 1983	Section 6.
1984 c. 32	London Regional Transport Act 1984	In Schedule 6, paragraph 4.
1984 c. 43	Finance Act 1984	Sections 58 to 62.
1984 c. 43	Finance Act 1984	Section 78.
1984 c. 43	Finance Act 1984	Schedule 12.
1985 c. 21	Films Act 1985	Sections 6(2) and 7(5) and (6).
1985 c. 54	Finance Act 1985	Sections 55 to 59.
1985 c. 54	Finance Act 1985	Sections 61 to 66.
1985 c. 54	Finance Act 1985	Schedules 14 to 17.
1985 c. 71	Housing (Consequential Provisions) Act 1985	In Schedule 2, paragraph 54.
1986 c. 41	Finance Act 1986	Sections 55, 56 and 57.
1986 c. 41	Finance Act 1986	Schedules 13 to 16.
1987 c. 51	Finance (No.2) Act 1987	Section 64(1), (5), (6) and (7)(a).
1987 c. 51	Finance (No.2) Act 1987	Section 72.
1988 c. 1	Income and Corporation Taxes Act 1988	In section 87(7) the words from "and the reference" to the end.
1988 c. 1	Income and Corporation Taxes Act 1988	In section 497(1) the words from "and in" to the end.
1988 c. 1	Income and Corporation Taxes Act 1988	In section 503(1) the words "and of Chapter I of Part III of the Finance Act 1971".
1988 c. 1	Income and Corporation Taxes Act 1988	In section 810(4)(b) the words from "incurred or" to "as".
1988 c. 1	Income and Corporation Taxes Act 1988	In Schedule 21, paragraph 6(2).
1988 c. 1	Income and Corporation Taxes Act 1988	In Schedule 29, paragraphs 1 and 2, and in the Table in paragraph 32, the entries relating to the Capital Allowances Act 1968; section 306 of the Income and Corporation Taxes Act 1970; sections 40 to 44 and 47 of and Schedule 8 to the Finance Act 1971; sections 68 and 69 of the Finance Act 1972; section 41 of the Finance Act 1976; the Finance Act 1978; sections 64 to 73 of the Finance Act 1980; sections 70 and 72 of and Schedules 11 and 12 to the Finance Act 1982; section 60 of the Finance Act 1984; sections 56 and 57 of and Schedule 17 to the Finance Act 1985; and
1988 c. 1	Income and Corporation Taxes Act 1988	Schedules 13 to 16 to the Finance Act 1986.
1988 c. 39	Finance Act 1988	Sections 90 to 95.
1988 c. 39	Finance Act 1988	In Schedule 3, paragraphs 23 and 24.
1988 c. 39	Finance Act 1988	In Schedule 6, paragraph 6(1).
1989 c. 15	Water Act 1989	In Schedule 25, paragraph 36.
1989 c. 26	Finance Act 1989	Sections 117 to 120.
1989 c. 26	Finance Act 1989	In Schedule 13, paragraphs 1 to 26 and 28 to 30.
1989 c. 29	Electricity Act 1989	In paragraph 5(3) of Schedule 11 the word "not".

== Subsequent developments ==
The whole act was repealed by section 580 of, and schedule 4 to, the Capital Allowances Act 2001, which took effect on 1 April 2001 for corporation tax purposes and 6 April 2001 for income tax purposes.
