= Income and Corporation Taxes Act 1970 =

Act of the Parliament of the United Kingdom

Income and Corporation Taxes Act 1970 (Note: Section 54(1).)
- Act of Parliament
- Parliament of the United Kingdom
- Long title: An Act to consolidate certain of the enactments relating to income tax and corporation tax, including certain enactments relating also to other taxes.
- Citation: 1970 c. 10
- Territorial extent: United Kingdom

Dates
- Royal assent: 12 March 1970
- Commencement: various (Note: Section 468.)
- Repealed: 6 April 1992

Other legislation
- Amends: See § Repealed enactments
- Repeals/revokes: See § Repealed enactments
- Amended by: National Savings Bank Act 1971; Interpretation Act 1978; Capital Gains Tax Act 1979; Armed Forces Act 1981; Bankruptcy (Scotland) Act 1985; Law Reform (Miscellaneous Provisions) (Scotland) Act 1985; Building Societies Act 1986; Income and Corporation Taxes Act 1988; Capital Allowances Act 1990
- Repealed by: Taxation of Chargeable Gains Act 1992
- Relates to: Finance Act 1969; Taxes Management Act 1970

Status: Repealed

Text of statute as originally enacted

The Income and Corporation Taxes Act 1970 (c. 10) was an act of the Parliament of the United Kingdom which was repealed in 1992.

== Background ==
The act was passed as a consolidation bill, recommended by the Law Commission as part of its first programme of consolidation and statute law revision.

Substantive amendments required in advance of consolidation were contained in schedule 20 of the Finance Act 1969.

== Provisions ==
=== Section 226 plans ===
Under section 226 of this act, retirement annuity plans were first introduced to give self-employed people the right to contribute to a pension.

These plans were often known as section 226 plans even when the legislation was superseded.

=== Repealed enactments ===
Section 538(1) of the act repealed 38 enactments, listed in the sixteenth schedule to the act.

Citation	Short title	Extent of repeal
15 & 16 Geo. 6 & 1 Eliz. 2. c. 10	Income Tax Act 1952	The whole act.
15 & 16 Geo. 6 & 1 Eliz. 2. c. 33	Finance Act 1952	Part III, except section 30. Sections 67 and 70. Section 76(4). In Schedule 6, Part II, and paragraph 18(2).
1 & 2 Eliz. 2. c. 34	Finance Act 1953	Part III. In section 35, subsection (4)(a)(6).
2 & 3 Eliz. 2. c. 32	Atomic Energy Authority Act 1954	Section 6(2).
2 & 3 Eliz. 2. c. 44	Finance Act 1954	Part III, except section 15. Section 35(4). Schedules 2 to 4.
2 & 3 Eliz. 2. c. 62	Post Office Savings Bank Act 1954	In section 10(2), the words "by a post office savings bank".
3 & 4 Eliz. 2. c. 15	Finance Act 1955	The whole act.
4 & 5 Eliz. 2. c. 17	Finance (No. 2) Act 1955	The whole act.
4 & 5 Eliz. 2. c. 54	Finance Act 1956	Part II, but, in the case of section 19, only as respects deaths occurring after 3rd June 1969. Part III except section 26(2). In section 40, subsection (1) except paragraph (b); subsection (3); and subsection (6). In section 41, the words "Part XIX of the Income Tax Act 1952, and". Section 44(3). Schedules 2 and 3.
5 & 6 Eliz. 2. c. 48	Electricity Act 1957	Section 24.
5 & 6 Eliz. 2. c. 49	Finance Act 1957	Part III. Section 42(2)(c).
6 & 7 Eliz. 2. c. 56	Finance Act 1958	Part III. Section 37(1), and, in section 37(4), the words "employment in the public services of an overseas territory and to". Section 40(2)(c). Schedules 5 and 6.
6 & 7 Eliz. 2. c. 72	Insurance Companies Act 1958	In section 33(1), the definition of "life assurance business".
7 & 8 Eliz. 2. c. 58	Finance Act 1959	Part III. Section 37(2)(c). Schedules 4 to 7.
8 & 9 Eliz. 2. c. 44	Finance Act 1960	Parts II and III. Sections 68 to 72. In section 73, in subsection (1), the words "income tax and from"; in subsection (3), the words "either of income tax or" and the proviso; in subsection (6), paragraph (b) and the word "and" preceding it. In section 79, subsection (2), from "and in Part II" to the end; and subsection (3)(6). Schedules 4 to 7.
8 & 9 Eliz. 2. c. 58	Charities Act 1960	In Schedule 6, the entry relating to Schedule 8 to the Income Tax Act 1952.
9 & 10 Eliz. 2. c. 36	Finance Act 1961	Part II. In section 37, subsection (2) from "and in Part II" to the end; and subsection (3) from "and Part II" to the end.
10 & 11 Eliz. 2. c. 44	Finance Act 1962	Part II. In section 34(2), the words from "Part II" to the second "the profits tax". Schedules 9 and 10.
1963 c. 24	British Museum Act 1963	In Schedule 2, paragraph 3 from the beginning to "Trustees of the British Museum and".
1963 c. 25	Finance Act 1963	Part II. In section 73, subsection (3) from "and in Part II" to the end, and subsection (4) from "Part II" to "Income Tax Acts". Schedules 4 to 10, and Part I (except paragraph 1) of Schedule 12.
1964 c. 37	Income Tax Management Act 1964	The whole act.
1964 c. 49	Finance Act 1964	Part II. Section 26(3) from "and Part II" to the end. Schedule 7. In Schedule 8, paragraphs 4 to 7.
1964 c. 92	Finance (No. 2) Act 1964	Section 1. Section 10(2) from the beginning to "Income Tax Acts and".
1965 c. 4	Science and Technology Act 1965	In Schedule 2, the entry relating to section 449(1)(a) of the Income Tax Act 1952.
1965 c. 11	Ministerial Salaries and Members' Pensions Act 1965	Sections 4(5), 13(2) and 18. In Schedule 4, the entry relating to section 385(2) of the Income Tax Act 1952.
1965 c. 25	Finance Act 1965	Part II, except section 17(15). In section 20(3), the words "and subject to section 82 of this Act". In section 35, subsection (2) from "notwithstanding" to "assessments"; and subsections (3) to (5). Section 36. Section 37, except subsection (1). In section 41, in subsection (1)(b), the words "as defined by Schedule 18 to this Act"; and in subsection (9), the words "as defined in Schedule 18 to this Act". In section 44, subsections (6) to (8). Section 45(11). Sections 46 to 83. In section 84(7), the words "to the inspector" and "to his satisfaction", and from "Section 9" to the end. Sections 85, 86 and 89. In section 94, subsections (4) to (8). Section 96. Section 97(2). In Schedule 6, paragraph 29(4). In Schedule 7, paragraph 7(2); and in paragraph 18, the words "as defined in Schedule 18 to this Act" in sub-paragraph (1), and the words "as so defined" in sub-paragraph (3). In Schedule 10, paragraphs 1 and 2, and 5 to 11; paragraph 12(2) from "but the provisions" to the end; and paragraphs 14, 16, 17 and 18. Schedules 11 to 19. In Schedule 21, in paragraph 2(2)(a), the words "(within the meaning of Schedule 14 to this Act)"; and paragraph 3(8) from "(control" to the end.
1966 c. 18	Finance Act 1966	Part II. Sections 26 and 28. In section 29, subsections (1) to (3); subsection (4) from "and so much" to the end; subsections (5) to (8); subsections (10) and (11); and in subsection (12), paragraphs (a) and (c). Section 30. Sections 33 and 34. Part IV. In section 45, subsections (1) to (4); subsection (6) from the definition of "limited liability company" to the end; and subsection (7). Sections 49 to 51. So much of section 53(2) as relates to Parts II and IV of the Act. Schedules 4 to 7, except paragraph 19 of Schedule 5 and paragraphs 14 and 23 of Schedule 6. Part I of Schedule 8. In Schedule 10, paragraphs 3, 14 and 15. Schedule 12.
1967 c. 17	Iron and Steel Act 1967	Section 26(8)(b).
1967 c. 54	Finance Act 1967	Parts II and III. In section 34(1), from "allowance" to "and". In section 35, subsections (1) and (4). Section 36. Section 37, from "and a sum so payable" to the end. In section 38, subsections (1) to (3); and, in subsection (6), from the first "for" to "years, and". Sections 39 to 41. Section 43. In section 45(3), paragraphs (d) and (e), and paragraph (h) from first "with" to "income tax, and". Schedules 10 and 11. In Schedule 13, paragraph 7 and Part II. In Schedule 14, paragraph 7(4). In Schedule 15, paragraph 1.
1968 c. 3	Capital Allowances Act 1968	In section 47(4), the words from the beginning to "this Act". In section 70(5), the words from the beginning to "this Act". In section 81(1), the words (after paragraph (c)) "against an assessment under Schedule D". In section 82, in subsection (1), the words "interest and other"; and in subsection (2), the words from the beginning to the first "this Act". In section 87(1), the definition of "company". In section 94(2), the definition of "company". Section 98(2). Schedule 12.
1968 c. 13	National Loans Act 1968	Section 16(5).
1968 c. 44	Finance Act 1968	Sections 11 to 22. In section 23, subsections (1) and (2); in subsection (3), paragraph (b), the word "and" preceding that paragraph, and the words "and the proviso to the said paragraph 10(3)"; and subsections (4) and (5). Sections 24 to 30. Section 33. In section 34, the words "and Schedule 13 to this Act (tax on short-term capital gains)". In section 40, subsections (4) to (7); paragraphs (b) and (c) of subsection (8); and subsection (9). In section 53, subsection (1) from the beginning to "1952 and"; and subsection (2) from "and in particular" to the end. Section 61(4). Schedules 8 to 10. In Schedule 12, paragraphs 13, 15(3) and 18 to 21; and, in paragraph 23, sub-paragraph (1)(c), and sub-paragraphs (2) to (6). Schedule 13.
1968 c. 73	Transport Act 1968	Section 161(2).
1969 c. 32	Finance Act 1969	Part II, except subsections (1) and (2) of section 16. In section 41, subsections (4) to (6). Section 53. Section 61(3)(c). Schedules 13 to 16. In Schedule 17, paragraph 21 of Part III as respects deaths occurring after 3rd June 1969. Part II of Schedule 18. In Schedule 19, paragraph 3(2); in paragraph 6(1), the words "and section 16(1) of the Finance Act 1962"; in paragraph 8(3), the words "and of the proviso to section 12(6) of the Finance Act 1962"; in paragraph 9, the words "and in Chapter II of Part II of the Finance Act 1962"; paragraph 11(2); paragraph 13; paragraph 16(6); paragraphs 18 to 21; and sub-paragraphs (1) and (2) of paragraph 22. Schedule 20, except paragraphs 11, 26 and 28(2), and paragraph 30(4) in its application to paragraph 11.
1969 c. 48	Post Office Act 1969	In section 109, the words from "and, accordingly" to the end. In Part III of Schedule 6, the entries relating to section 29 of the Income Tax Act 1952, section 9 of the Finance Act 1956 and section 20 of the Finance Act 1966. Paragraph 21 of Schedule 9.
1969 c. 50	Trustee Savings Banks Act 1969	Subsections (1) and (2) of section 93.
1970 c. 46	Radiological Protection Act 1970	Section 2(7).
SI 1969/535	Income Tax (Interest on Unpaid Tax) Order 1969	The whole order.

== Subsequent developments ==
The whole act was repealed by section 290(3) of, and schedule 12 of, the Taxation of Chargeable Gains Act 1992, which came into force on 6 April 1992.

== See also ==
- Pensions in the United Kingdom
- List of acts of the Parliament of the United Kingdom from 1970

== Bibliography ==
- Richard Bramell and Michael Musgrave. "Income and Corporation Taxes Act 1970". Sweet & Maxwell's Consolidated Income Tax Acts 1970. Sweet & Maxwell. Stevens & Sons. London. W Green & Son. Edinburgh. 1970. Chapter 10. Google
- John Burke and Clifford Walsh (eds). "Income and Corporation Taxes Act 1970". Current Law Statutes Annotated 1970. Sweet & Maxwell. Stevens & Sons. London. W Green & Son. Edinburgh. 1970. Chapter 10. Google
- "The Income and Corporation Taxes Act 1970 (1970 c. 10)". Halsbury's Statutes of England. Third Edition. Butterworths. London. 1971. Volume 33. Page 17 et seq. See also Preliminary Note at pp 2 to 6.
- "The Income and Corporation Taxes Act 1970 (1970 c. 10)". Halsbury's Statutes of England. Third Edition. Volume 40: Continuation Volume 1968-1970. Butterworths. London. 1972. Page 17 et seq.
- "Income and Corporation Taxes Act 1970" (1970) 89 Law Notes 129 (May 1970)
- John Clark. Section 482 of the Income and Corporation Taxes Act 1970. Institute of Taxation. 1980. Google
- Halsbury's Laws of England. Fourth Edition. Butterworths. London. 1978. Volume 23. Title "Income Taxation". Passim. Reviewed at "Reviews" (1979) 123 The Solicitors' Journal 46 (19 January 1979).
- 1983-84 British Master Tax Guide. CCH Editions. Passim. Google
- Barry Pinson and John Gardiner. Pinson on Revenue Law: comprising Income Tax . . . Twelfth Edition. Sweet & Maxwell. London. 1978. Passim.
- Henry Toch. Income Tax. Ninth Edition. MacDonald and Evans. 1976. Passim.
