= Capital Allowances Act 1968 =

Act of the Parliament of the United Kingdom

Capital Allowances Act 1968 (Note: Section 100(1).)
- Act of Parliament
- Parliament of the United Kingdom
- Long title: An Act to consolidate Parts X and XI of the Income Tax Act 1952 with related provisions in that Act and subsequent Acts, but without the provisions of the said Part X relating to patents or to agricultural estate management expenditure which is not capital expenditure.
- Citation: 1968 c. 3
- Territorial extent: United Kingdom

Dates
- Royal assent: 1 February 1968
- Commencement: 1 February 1968 (Note: Section 96(1).)
- Repealed: 19 March 1990
Other legislation
Amends	See § Repealed enactments
Repeals/revokes	See § Repealed enactments
Amended by	Finance Act 1969
Repealed by	Capital Allowances Act 1990

Status: Repealed

Text of statute as originally enacted

The Capital Allowances Act 1968 (c. 3) was an act of the Parliament of the United Kingdom that consolidated enactments relating to capital allowances for capital expenditure in the United Kingdom.

== Provisions ==
=== Repealed enactments ===
Section 96(3) of the act repealed 17 enactments, listed in schedule 11 to the act.

Enactments repealed by section 96(3)
Citation	Short title	Extent of repeal
15 & 16 Geo. 6 & 1 Eliz. 2. c. 10	Income Tax Act 1952	In Part X, Chapters I, II and III, section 314, the definitions of "forestry land" and "forestry income" in section 315 and Chapter VII. Part XI. Section 482. Section 484(2). Section 527(4)(a). In section 531(2) proviso the words "three hundred and twenty-three, three hundred and thirty-nine" and the words "and under subsection (3) of section four hundred and eighty-two of this Act". Section 531(3). Schedules 12, 14 and 15. In Schedule 22, in Part II, in paragraph 3 the words "X, I, II, and" and the words "or for any of the purposes of Part XI of this Act", paragraphs 4 to 10 and paragraphs 14 and 15.
15 & 16 Geo. 6 & 1 Eliz. 2. c. 33	Finance Act 1952	Sections 19, 20, 21 and 22. In section 24 the words, from "under Chapter IX" to "plant and". Section 25. Schedule 5. In Schedule 6, Part I, paragraph 18(1) and paragraph 18(2) from the beginning to "Part X and".
1 & 2 Eliz. 2. c. 34	Finance Act 1953	Sections 16, 17 and 18.
2 & 3 Eliz. 2. c. 44	Finance Act 1954	In section 16, subsections (2)(a), (b), (bb) and (c), and in subsection (8) the words from "and to amend" to the end of the subsection. Section 20(8). Sections 21 and 23. In Schedule 2 paragraphs 1(4) and 2, and in paragraph 4(1) the words "or the substitution therefor of an initial allowance" and paragraphs 6 and 7.
4 & 5 Eliz. 2. c. 54	Finance Act 1956	Sections 16 and 17.
5 & 6 Eliz. 2. c. 49	Finance Act 1957	Sections 16 and 17. Schedules 3 and 4.
6 & 7 Eliz. 2. c. 56	Finance Act 1958	Section 15. In Schedule 6, in Table II in Part I the figures "324(1)".
7 & 8 Eliz. 2. c. 58	Finance Act 1959	In section 21 subsection (2) and in subsection (4), paragraph (b) and the words from "except that" to the end of the subsection. In Schedule 4 paragraphs 1 to 4, 5(d), 6, 7 and 8. In Schedule 5 paragraph 3(3).
8 & 9 Eliz. 2. c. 44	Finance Act 1960	Section 30. Sections 23 to 27. Section 42.
9 & 10 Eliz. 2. c. 36	Finance Act 1961	Sections 34 and 35. Section 36 except for the words in subsection (1) repealed, with savings, by the Finance Act 1966. Section 37. Sections 40 and 41. Section 42 except for the purposes of sections 33, 38 and 39 (so far as not repealed by the Finance Act 1966). In Schedule 12 paragraph 10 and in paragraph 12 the words "and forestry income".
10 & 11 Eliz. 2. c. 46	Transport Act 1962	In Schedule 2 the entry relating to section 324 of the Income Tax Act 1952.
1963 c. 25	Finance Act 1963	In Schedule 4, in Part III of the Table the entries relating to sections 299, 307 and 308 of the Income Tax Act 1952, and to Schedule 5 to the Finance Act 1952; and the amendment of section 323(1) of the Income Tax Act 1952.
1964 c. 37	Income Tax Management Act 1964	In Schedule 2 the amendments of sections 335 and 340(4) of the Income Tax Act 1952.
1965 c. 4	Science and Technology Act 1965	Sections 13 and 14.
1965 c. 25	Finance Act 1965	Section 45(2). Section 56. Section 63(2) and (3). In Schedule 14, paragraph 1(5), paragraphs 3 and 5, paragraph 6 except for subparagraph (6), paragraphs 7 to 14, in paragraph 15(4) the words from "for the words 'on'" to "'1965' and", paragraphs 16 to 19, paragraphs 22 to 24, paragraph 25(c)(d), in paragraph 26 the words from "(and in particular" to the end of the paragraph, paragraph 27(2). In Schedule 15, paragraph 6 as respects section 482 of the Income Tax Act 1952. In Schedule 16, paragraph 8.
1966 c. 18	Finance Act 1966	In section 35, in subsection (1) the words from "and section 21(2)" to "reduced)" and subsections (3), (4) and (5) except for subsection (5) as applied by section 36(4). Section 37. In Schedule 6 paragraph 11(3) the words "section 56(6) and".
1967 c. 54	Finance Act 1967	Section 21.

== Subsequent developments ==
The whole act was repealed by section 164(4) of, and schedule 2 to, the Capital Allowances Act 1990, which came into force on 19 March 1990.
