= Income and Corporation Taxes Act 1988 =

Act of the Parliament of the United Kingdom

Income and Corporation Taxes Act 1988 (Note: Section 845.)
- Act of Parliament
- Parliament of the United Kingdom
- Long title: An Act to consolidate certain of the enactments relating to income tax and corporation tax, including certain enactments relating also to capital gains tax; and to repeal as obsolete section 339(1) of the Income and Corporation Taxes Act 1970 and paragraphs 3 and 4 of Schedule 11 to the Finance Act 1980.
- Citation: 1988 c. 1
- Territorial extent: United Kingdom

Dates
- Royal assent: 9 February 1988
- Commencement: For personal taxation tax year 1988-1989 and after For corporation taxation company accounting periods ending after 5 April 1988; Except ss. 96, 380 to 384, 393, 394, 400, 703 and 812 (Note: Section 843.)
Other legislation
Amends	Provisional Collection of Taxes Act 1968; Friendly Societies Act 1974; Airports Act 1986; See § Repealed enactments
Repeals/revokes	See § Repealed enactments
Amended by	Capital Allowances Act 1990; Age of Legal Capacity (Scotland) Act 1991; Social Security (Consequential Provisions) Act 1992; Social Security (Consequential Provisions) (Northern Ireland) Act 1992; Taxation of Chargeable Gains Act 1992; Museums and Galleries Act 1992; Trade Union Reform and Employment Rights Act 1993; Employment Tribunals Act 1996; Employment Rights Act 1996; Limited Liability Partnerships Act 2000; Abolition of Feudal Tenure etc. (Scotland) Act 2000; Capital Allowances Act 2001; National Health Service (Consequential Provisions) Act 2006; Corporation Tax Act 2010; Statute Law (Repeals) Act 2013; Co-operative and Community Benefit Societies Act 2014

Status: Amended

Text of statute as originally enacted

Revised text of statute as amended

Text of the Income and Corporation Taxes Act 1988 as in force today (including any amendments) within the United Kingdom, from legislation.gov.uk.

The Income and Corporation Taxes Act 1988 (c. 1), also known as ICTA, is an act of the Parliament of the United Kingdom that the foremost legislation concerned with taxation until the Income Tax Act 2007 and the Corporation Tax Act 2010. ICTA was enacted in order to consolidate a number of earlier legislative provisions covering taxation. Originally, ICTA primarily covered income tax (paid principally by individuals) and corporation tax (paid principally by companies). It is the longest Act of Parliament to have ever been written.

== Section 660A ==
In its United Kingdom Tax Bulletin 64 (April 2003), the Inland Revenue (now HM Revenue and Customs) announced new guidance on the "settlements legislation". This is a body of law which seeks to prevent someone (known as the "settlor") from avoiding tax by reclassifying income as belonging to someone else (known as the beneficiary). The income is then taxed at the beneficiary's lower rate although the settlor continues to benefit from it. The legislation targets spouses and also parents seeking to divert income via their minor children.

Section 660A of the Act (added by the Finance Act 1995) covered this issue. Using the revised (April 2003) interpretation of s.660A, UK HMRC have been targeting businesses set up by spouses where they are aware that income is split between the spouses, and only one of them directly generates that income. In theory s.660A can apply to partnerships as well as limited companies, this has yet to be tested in the UK courts. In 2007 the interpretation was finally rejected by the Law Lords, resulting in the government proposing new legalisation to tackle the perceived abuse.

This section was repealed by the Income Tax (Trading and Other Income) Act 2005 with effect from 6 April 2005.

== Amendments ==
Following the Tax Law Rewrite Project, sections relating to income tax have been substituted by the Income Tax (Earnings and Pensions) Act 2003, the Income Tax (Trading and Other Income) Act 2005 and the Income Tax Act 2007. These acts have abolished the schedular system of taxation for income tax; however, the schedular system still applies for the purposes of corporation tax.

ICTA has also been frequently amended by the Finance Acts that are enacted annually in the UK.

Sections relating to the House of Commons Members' Fund were amended by the House of Commons Members' Fund Act 2016.

== Provisions ==
=== Repealed enactments ===
Section 844(4) of the act repealed 62 enactments, listed in schedule 31 to the act.

Enactments repealed by section 844(4)
Citation	Short title	Extent of repeal
1965 c. 25	Finance Act 1965	Section 84. Schedule 20.
1969 c. 32	Finance Act 1969	In section 52(1) the words from "or through" to the end.
1970 c. 9	Taxes Management Act 1970	In section 88(5)(e) the words from "or" to the end. In section 118(1)(a) the words from "as" to "Act". In Schedule 2, in paragraph 2(2), the words "section 311".
1970 c. 10	Income and Corporation Taxes Act 1970	Sections 1 to 237. Section 238(1) to (3). Sections 239 to 266. Section 277. Sections 282 to 305. Sections 307 to 341A. Sections 343 to 535. Schedules 1 to 13. In Schedule 14, paragraphs 1 to 10 and 12 to 27. In Schedule 15, in Part II of the Table in paragraph 11 the entry relating to the Finance Act 1969. Schedule 16.
1970 c. 24	Finance Act 1970	Sections 11 to 14. Section 16. Sections 19 to 26. Section 29(1), (2), (3)(a), (4) and (8). In Schedule 3, paragraphs 2 to 7. In Schedule 4, paragraphs 6, 8, 9(6) and 11. Schedule 5.
1970 c. 54	Income and Corporation Taxes (No.2) Act 1970	The whole act.
1971 c. 68	Finance Act 1971	Sections 13 to 20. Section 21(1) to (5). Sections 22 to 28. Sections 32 to 36. Section 39. Section 50(8). Section 54. Schedule 2. Schedule 3, except paragraph 8. Schedule 4. In Schedule 6, Parts I and III. Schedule 7. In Schedule 8, paragraph 16(3) to (9). In Schedule 9, paragraph 4.
1972 c. 41	Finance Act 1972	Sections 62 to 66. Section 67(2)(c). Sections 70 to 77. Sections 79 to 95. Sections 97 to 110. Section 111(2). Section 124. Schedules 9 to 23. In Schedule 24, paragraphs 15 to 33.
1973 c. 51	Finance Act 1973	Sections 10 to 31. In section 32, subsection (5) and in subsection (6) the words from "sections" to "1972". Sections 33 to 36. In section 38, in subsection (1) the words "income tax" and "and corporation tax" and subsection (6). Sections 39 and 40. Section 43. Sections 52 and 53. In section 54(1) the words "income tax, corporation tax or". Schedules 8 to 14. In Schedule 15, paragraphs 1 and 3. Schedule 16. In Schedule 21, paragraphs 6 to 9.
1974 c. 30	Finance Act 1974	Sections 7 to 16. Sections 18 to 23. Sections 25 to 28. Section 30. Sections 36 and 37. In section 52 the words "the Income Tax Acts, the Corporation Tax Acts and". Schedules 1 and 2. In Schedule 12, paragraphs 7 to 12.
1974 c. 39	Consumer Credit Act 1974	In Schedule 4, paragraph 29.
1974 c. 44	Housing Act 1974	Section 120.
1974 c. 46	Friendly Societies Act 1974	Section 64. In Schedule 9, paragraph 23.
1974 c. 49	Insurance Companies Act 1974	In Schedule 1, the entry relating to the Income and Corporation Taxes Act 1970.
1975 c. 7	Finance Act 1975	Sections 5 to 12. Sections 16 and 17. Schedules 1 and 2. In Schedule 12, paragraphs 16 and 19.
1975 c. 18	Social Security (Consequential Provisions) Act 1975	In Schedule 2, paragraphs 38 and 39.
1975 c. 22	Oil Taxation Act 1975	Sections 13 to 20. Schedule 9.
1975 c. 45	Finance (No. 2) Act 1975	Sections 25 to 43. Section 44(1) to (3) and (6). Section 46(6). In section 47, in subsection (1) the words "income tax or" and subsections (3), (5) to (7), (9) and (10). Section 48. Sections 50 to 53. Sections 68 to 71. Schedule 8. Schedules 12 and 13.
1976 c. 40	Finance Act 1976	Sections 24 to 38. Sections 44 to 50. Sections 60 to 71. Section 72(1) to (12). Schedules 4, 7 and 8. In Schedule 9, paragraphs 3, 4, 8, 9 and 12 to 16.
1976 c. 71	Supplementary Benefits Act 1976	In Schedule 7, paragraph 16.
1977 c. 36	Finance Act 1977	Sections 17 to 39. Sections 45 to 48. Schedules 7 and 8.
1977 c. 49	National Health Service Act 1977	In Schedule 15, paragraph 57.
1977 c. 53	Finance (Income Tax Reliefs) Act 1977	The whole act.
1978 c. 23	Judicature (Northern Ireland) Act 1978	In Schedule 5, the entry relating to the Income and Corporation Taxes Act 1970.
1978 c. 29	National Health Service (Scotland) Act 1978	In Schedule 16, paragraph 37.
1978 c. 42	Finance Act 1978	Sections 13 to 28. Section 29(1), (2) and (4). Sections 30 to 36. Sections 41 to 43. Sections 53 to 61. Schedules 2 to 5. Schedule 9.
1978 c. 44	Employment Protection (Consolidation) Act 1978	In Schedule 16, paragraphs 9 and 14.
1979 c. 14	Capital Gains Tax Act 1979	Section 155(5). In Schedule 7, paragraph 5; in paragraph 8, in Part I of the Table, the entries relating to sections 265, 352 and 526 of the 1970 Act, the Finance Act 1972, section 29 of the Finance Act 1970, section 67 of the Finance Act 1976 and section 45 of the Finance Act 1977, and paragraph 3 in Part II of the Table; and in paragraph 9 the entries relating to sections 186, 246, 265, 266, 305, 352, 359, 360, 474, 488 and 489 of the 1970 Act, the Finance Act 1972, the Finance Act 1973, sections 26 and 30 of the Finance Act 1974, section 42 of and Schedule 8 to the Finance (No. 2) Act 1975, section 67 of the Finance Act 1976 and the Finance Act 1978 (except section 64(5)).
1979 c. 25	Finance Act 1979	The whole act.
1979 c. 34	Credit Unions Act 1979	Section 25.
1979 c. 47	Finance (No. 2) Act 1979	Sections 5 to 13. Sections 15 and 16. In section 17(1) the words "income tax, corporation tax and". Schedules 1 and 2.
1980 c. 48	Finance Act 1980	Sections 18 to 56. Section 57(1), (2)(b), (3) and (4). Sections 59 and 60. Section 61(1). Section 63. Section 70(1), (2), (4), (5) and (6). Section 88(7). Section 109(11). Section 118(1) and (2). Section 119. Section 121. Schedules 8 to 11. In Schedule 18, paragraphs 1 to 8, 13, 14 and 17 to 22 and, in paragraph 23, in sub-paragraph (1) the definitions of "control" and "distributing company", in the definition of "group" the words "except in paragraph 7(2)(c)" and from "and" to the end, and all the subsequent definitions except that of "shares", and sub-paragraphs (2) and (4).
1981 c. 35	Finance Act 1981	Sections 19 to 37. Section 38(1) and (2). Sections 39 to 72. Section 120. Section 138. Schedules 9 to 12.
1981 c. 61	British Nationality Act 1981	In Schedule 7, the entry relating to the Income and Corporation Taxes Act 1970.
1981 c. 64	New Towns Act 1981	In Schedule 12, paragraph 16.
1982 c. 39	Finance Act 1982	Sections 20 to 26. Sections 28 to 67. Section 78. Section 80(4). Section 136. Section 137(4) and (5). Section 138. In section 157(5) the words from "or" to "of that Act". Schedules 7 to 10. In Schedule 21, paragraph 3(1).
1982 c. 50	Insurance Companies Act 1982	In Schedule 5, paragraphs 10, 17, 24, 25 and 28(b).
1982 c. 52	Industrial Development Act 1982	In Schedule 2, paragraphs 16 and 18.
1982 c. 53	Administration of Justice Act 1982	Sections 46(2)(e) and 74.
1983 c. 21	Pilotage Act 1983	In Schedule 3, paragraph 10.
1983 c. 28	Finance Act 1983	Sections 10 to 28. Section 46(1), (2) and (3)(a) and (b). Schedules 4 and 5.
1983 c. 49	Finance (No. 2) Act 1983	Sections 1 to 5. Schedule 1.
1983 c. 56	Oil Taxation Act 1983	Section 11.
1984 c. 12	Telecommunications Act 1984	In Schedule 4, paragraph 62.
1984 c. 28	County Courts Act 1984	In Schedule 2, paragraph 37.
1984 c. 43	Finance Act 1984	Sections 17 to 43. In section 44, in subsection (1) the words from "256" to "relief) and" and subsection (3). Sections 45 to 49. Section 50(10)(a) and (c). Sections 51 to 55. In section 56, subsections (1) and (2) and in subsection (4) the words from the beginning to "assessment and". Section 72. In section 73, subsections (1) to (3), (5) and (6). Sections 74 to 77. In section 79, in subsection (5) the words from "and in relation" to the end. Sections 82 to 100. Section 126(3)(a). Schedules 7 to 10. In Schedule 11, paragraphs 1(2)(a) to (e) and (j), 2 and 3 and in paragraph 7 the words "income tax, corporation tax or". In Schedule 13, paragraph 5. In Schedule 14, paragraph 15(4). Schedules 15 to 20.
1984 c. 48	Health and Social Security Act 1984	In Schedule 4, paragraph 2.
1984 c. 51	Inheritance Tax Act 1984	In Schedule 8, paragraphs 8, 17, 18, 21 and 22.
1984 c. 62	Friendly Societies Act 1984	Section 2(4), (5)(a) and (b) and (6).
1985 c. 54	Finance Act 1985	Sections 34 to 49. Sections 51 to 54. Section 60. Sections 64 and 65. In section 72, in subsection (1), paragraph (b) and "and" immediately preceding it, and subsection (7). Sections 73 to 77. Schedules 9 to 13. In Schedule 14, paragraph 16. Schedule 18. Schedules 22 and 23. In Schedule 25, paragraphs 7, 8 and 9.
1985 c. 58	Trustee Savings Bank Act 1985	In Schedule 2, paragraphs 6(3) and (5) to (7) and 7(1), and in paragraph 9 the definition of "exempt investment".
1985 c. 71	Housing (Consequential Provisions) Act 1985	In Schedule 2, paragraphs 18(2) and (3), 28, 31 and 54(2).
1985 c. 73	Law Reform (Miscellaneous Provisions) (Scotland) Act 1985	In Schedule 1, paragraph 38.
1986 c. 39	Patents, Designs and Marks Act 1986	In Schedule 2, paragraph 1(2)(c).
1986 c. 41	Finance Act 1986	Sections 16 to 23. Section 24(1) to (3). Sections 25 to 32. Sections 34 to 54. Section 56(7)(a) and (b). Sections 61 to 63. Schedules 7 and 8. In Schedule 9, paragraphs 1 to 21 and 23. Schedules 10, 11 and 12. In Schedule 13, paragraphs 2(5)(a) and (b) and 26 and 27. In Schedule 16, paragraph 10(7). Schedule 17. In Schedule 18, paragraphs 1 to 6, in paragraph 9(1), paragraph (a) and in paragraph (c) the words "section 477 or" and paragraph 9(2).
1986 c. 45	Insolvency Act 1986	In Schedule 14 the entries relating to the Income and Corporation Taxes Act 1970, the Finance Act 1972, the Finance Act 1981 and the Finance Act 1983.
1986 c. 50	Social Security Act 1986	In Schedule 10, paragraphs 71 and 101.
1986 c. 53	Building Societies Act 1986	In Schedule 18, paragraphs 7 and 15.
1987 c. 16	Finance Act 1987	Sections 20 to 39. Section 40(1) and (2). Sections 41 to 46. Section 70(1). Section 71. Schedules 3 to 6. In Schedule 11, paragraphs 6 and 7. Schedule 15, except paragraph 12.
1987 c. 22	Banking Act 1987	In Schedule 6, paragraphs 13, 16 and 24.
1987 c. 45	Parliamentary and other Pensions Act 1987	In Schedule 3, paragraphs 2 and 5.
1987 c. 51	Finance (No. 2) Act 1987	Sections 1 to 63. Section 64(2). Sections 65 to 68. Sections 70 and 71. In section 73(1) the words "income tax, corporation tax or". Sections 74 to 77. Section 87. In section 88, subsections (5) and (6) and the words following paragraph (c) in subsection (7). Section 90. Sections 92 and 93. Schedules 1 to 5. In Schedule 6, paragraphs 1, 3, 6 and 8.

== See also ==
- Capital Allowances Act 2001
- Income Tax (Earnings and Pensions) Act 2003
- Income Tax (Trading and Other Income) Act 2005
- Income Tax Act 2007
- List of acts of the Parliament of the United Kingdom
- Pensions in the United Kingdom
- Taxation in the United Kingdom
- Taxation of Chargeable Gains Act 1992
- Umbrella company
- United Kingdom labour law
