= Finance Act 1965 =

Act of the Parliament of the United Kingdom

Finance Act 1965 (Note: Section 97(1).)
- Act of Parliament
- Parliament of the United Kingdom
- Long title: An Act to grant certain duties, to alter other duties, and to amend the law relating to the National Debt and the Public Revenue, and to make further provision in connection with Finance.
- Citation: 1965 c. 25
- Territorial extent: United Kingdom

Dates
- Royal assent: 5 August 1965
- Commencement: 5 August 1965 (Note: The Acts of Parliament (Commencement) Act 1793.)

Other legislation
- Amends: Public Works Loans Act 1964
- Amended by: Finance Act 1969; Income and Corporation Taxes Act 1970; Statute Law (Repeals) Act 1974; Capital Gains Tax Act 1979; Bankruptcy (Scotland) Act 1985; Housing (Consequential Provisions) Act 1985; Statute Law (Repeals) Act 1986; Income and Corporation Taxes Act 1988

Status: Amended

Text of statute as originally enacted

Revised text of statute as amended

Text of the Finance Act 1965 as in force today (including any amendments) within the United Kingdom, from legislation.gov.uk.

The Finance Act 1965 (c. 25) is an act of the Parliament of the United Kingdom which introduced two major new UK taxes. Corporation tax created a separate system for taxing the income of corporations, where previously they had paid income tax in the same way as private individuals. Capital gains tax is charged on the disposal of assets, and is based on any "real gain" made from the disposal. If the income comes within income tax, capital gains is not chargeable. Capital gains tax does not apply to corporations, but an identical provision, known as chargeable gains, is included in corporation tax.

It was criticised by the founders of the Institute for Fiscal Studies.

== See also ==
- Finance Act
- United Kingdom corporation tax
- Taxation in the United Kingdom
