= Taxes Management Act 1970 =

Act of the Parliament of the United Kingdom

Taxes Management Act 1970 (Note: Section 120.)
- Act of Parliament
- Parliament of the United Kingdom
- Long title: An Act to consolidate certain of the enactments relating to income tax, capital gains tax and corporation tax, including certain enactments relating also to other taxes.
- Citation: 1970 c. 9
- Territorial extent: United Kingdom

Dates
- Royal assent: 12 March 1970
- Commencement: 6 April 1970 (Note: Section 119(1).)
Other legislation
Amended by	Criminal Justice Act 1972; Judicature (Northern Ireland) Act 1978; Capital Gains Tax Act 1979; Law Reform (Miscellaneous Provisions) (Scotland) Act 1980; Debtors (Scotland) Act 1987; Income and Corporation Taxes Act 1988; Capital Allowances Act 1990; Capital Allowances Act 2001; National Insurance Contributions and Statutory Payments Act 2004; Statute Law (Repeals) Act 2013; Finance Act 2015
Relates to	Income and Corporation Taxes Act 1970

Status: Amended

Text of statute as originally enacted

Revised text of statute as amended

Text of the Taxes Management Act 1970 as in force today (including any amendments) within the United Kingdom, from legislation.gov.uk.

The Taxes Management Act 1970 (c. 9) is an act of the Parliament of the United Kingdom that consolidated enactments relating to the administration and management of income tax, capital gains tax and corporation tax in the United Kingdom. It was enacted alongside the companion Income and Corporation Taxes Act 1970, which consolidated the substantive provisions of income tax and corporation tax law; the corresponding management enactments previously in force were repealed by that act when both came into force on 6 April 1970.
