= Finance Act 1969 =

Act of the Parliament of the United Kingdom

Finance Act 1969 (Note: Section 61(1).)
- Act of Parliament
- Parliament of the United Kingdom
- Long title: An Act to grant certain duties, to alter other duties, and to amend the law relating to the National Debt and the Public Revenue, and to make further provision in connection with Finance.
- Citation: 1969 c. 32
- Territorial extent: United Kingdom (Note: Section 61(5): except as otherwise expressly provided, such of the provisions of the act as relate to matters in respect of which the Parliament of Northern Ireland had power to make laws did not extend to Northern Ireland.)

Dates
- Royal assent: 25 July 1969
- Commencement: 25 July 1969 (Note: The Acts of Parliament (Commencement) Act 1793. Numerous individual provisions were given other commencement dates, including some with retrospective effect; see the text of the act for details.)
Other legislation
Amends	See § Repealed enactments
Repeals/revokes	See § Repealed enactments
Amended by	Transfer of Functions (Education and Employment) Order 1995; Transfer of Functions (Registration and Statistics) Order 1996; Planning (Consequential Provisions) (Scotland) Act 1997; Government of Wales Act 1998; Statute Law (Repeals) Act 1998; Income Tax (Earnings and Pensions) Act 2003; Planning and Compulsory Purchase Act 2004; Welsh Development Agency (Transfer of Functions to the National Assembly for Wales and Abolition) Order 2005; Statistics and Registration Service Act 2007; Statute Law (Repeals) Act 2013; Finance Act 2026; Planning (Consequential Provisions) (Wales) Act 2026
Relates to	Taxes Management Act 1970; Income and Corporation Taxes Act 1970

Status: Partially repealed

Text of statute as originally enacted

Revised text of statute as amended

Text of the Finance Act 1969 as in force today (including any amendments) within the United Kingdom, from legislation.gov.uk.

The Finance Act 1969 (c. 32) is an act of the Parliament of the United Kingdom that granted and altered duties of customs and excise, amended the law relating to income tax, corporation tax and estate duty, made provision for capital gains and the betterment levy, and made further provision relating to the National Debt and the public revenue of the United Kingdom.

== Background ==
The act contained amendments in schedule 20 to the act designed to facilitate the consolidation of enactments relating to income and corporation tax by the Income and Corporation Taxes Act 1970, recommended by the Law Commission as part of its first programme of consolidation and statute law revision.

== Provisions ==
The act was divided into six parts. Part I (sections 1 to 6) dealt with customs and excise, terminating the ten per cent surcharge under the Finance Act 1961 and introducing new excise duties on off-course betting premises, bingo, gaming licences and gaming machines. Part II (sections 7 to 31) dealt with income tax and corporation tax, setting the rates of tax for 1969–70, altering personal reliefs, reducing the age of majority for tax purposes to eighteen, restricting the deductibility of interest, making special provision for close companies, and introducing anti-avoidance rules concerning changes in company ownership, the sale of income derived from personal activities, artificial transactions in land, and the transfer of assets abroad. Part III (sections 32 to 40) amended the law of estate duty, including the amount and rate of duty and the treatment of property passing on death and interests in expectancy. Part IV (sections 41 to 49) dealt with capital gains tax and the betterment levy chargeable under the Land Commission Act 1967, exempting gilt-edged securities from capital gains tax and introducing several reliefs from the levy. Part V (sections 50 and 51) amended the selective employment tax. Part VI (sections 52 to 61) contained miscellaneous provisions, including Treasury borrowing through trustee savings banks, contractual savings schemes, transfers of Treasury functions, an exemption from stamp duty for loan capital issued in foreign currencies, disclosure of information by the Board of Inland Revenue and the Commissioners of Customs and Excise for statistical purposes, amendments consequential on the planned consolidation of the Income Tax Acts and the Corporation Tax Acts, and the act's citation, interpretation and repeals provisions.

=== Repealed enactments ===
Section 61(6) of the act repealed 115 enactments, listed in the ten parts of schedule 21 to the act.

==== Part I: Customs and excise repeals ====
Part I — Customs and Excise Repeals
Citation	Short title	Extent of repeal
10 & 11 Eliz. 2. c. 13	Vehicles (Excise) Act 1962	As from 1st January 1970—in section 9(1) the words "a limited trade licence or" and the word "general"; in section 9(2)(a) the word "general"; in section 24(1), the words "general trade licence", and "limited trade licence".
1963 c. 9	Purchase Tax Act 1963	In Part I of Schedule 1—in Group 2, paragraphs (1), (2) and (3) of the exemptions; in Group 7, the words "Not chargeable under this Group" and the words "Tissue and fabrics exceeding 12 inches in width".
1964 c. 49	Finance Act 1964	In section 4(3), the word "and" in the second place where it occurs. As from 1st September 1969, section 6(1).
1965 c. 25	Finance Act 1965	Section 1.
1966 c. 18	Finance Act 1966	As from 1st October 1969—in section 13, paragraphs (c) and (d) of subsection (4) and in subsection (5) the words "in addition to bingo"; section 14; in section 15(6), the definitions of "gaming machine" and "supplier"; in Schedule 3—in paragraph 7, the words "or a gaming machine licence", the words "in the case of a gaming licence" and sub-paragraph (c); in paragraph 9, the words "or a gaming machine licence"; in paragraph 10, sub-paragraph (b); in paragraph 11, the words "or gaming machine licence", the words "in the case of a gaming licence", the words "bingo or, as the case may be, by way of", and sub-paragraph (b); in paragraph 13, the words "or gaming machine licence" and "or, as the case may be, 14(5)"; in paragraph 14, the words "or a gaming machine licence"; paragraphs 15 and 16; in paragraph 17(1), the words "or gaming machine licence", the words from "or, as the case may be, whereby" to "that date", and the words from "or, as the case may be to" onwards; in paragraph 18(1), the words "or on gaming machine licences" and the words "any of"; in paragraph 19, in sub-paragraph (c), the words "15, 16", and in sub-paragraph (d) the words "or gaming machines"; paragraph 22; and in paragraph 23(1), the words "or 14(1)" and "gaming machine".
1967 c. 54	Finance Act 1967	Section 1(1) to (4). As from 1st January 1970, section 11(1)(c). Schedule 2.
1968 c. 44	Finance Act 1968	Section 1(1), (2) and (4). Section 2(1). Section 3(1)(c). As from 1st October 1969, section 4(3). As from 1st January 1970, sections 8(2) and 9(a). Section 10(1). Schedules 1 to 3. As from 1st October 1969, Schedule 4 and, in paragraph 1 of Schedule 5, the words "or on gaming machine licences". In Schedule 6, paragraphs 1 to 3.
1968 c. 65	Gaming Act 1968	In Schedule 2, in paragraphs 20(1)(e) and 60(c), the words "or section 14". In Schedule 3, in paragraph 9(e), the words "or section 14". In Schedule 4, in paragraph 11(e), the words "or section 14". In Part III of Schedule 11, so much as amends section 13(4)(c) and section 14(2) of the Finance Act 1966, and so much as amends section 15(6) of that Act with respect to the definition of "gaming machine".
1969 c. 27	Vehicle and Driving Licences Act 1969	As from 1st January 1970, in section 33(1) the words "and 'general trade licence'".
1969 c. 32	Finance Act 1969	As from 1st September 1969, paragraph 4(1) of Schedule 7.

==== Part II: Disallowance of interest ====
Part II — Disallowance of Interest
Citation	Short title	Extent of repeal
15 & 16 Geo. 6 & 1 Eliz. 2. c. 10	Income Tax Act 1952	In section 138, for 1970–71 and subsequent years of assessment—in subsection (1)(e) the words "and without any deduction of United Kingdom income tax"; at the end of subsection (1) the words "notwithstanding anything in the last preceding section", and subsection (2). Section 169(5) as respects interest paid after 15th August 1970. Section 200 as respects interest paid in 1970–71 or any subsequent year of assessment. Section 445(3)(b) for 1970–71 and subsequent years of assessment. Section 524(5)(c) for 1970–71 and subsequent years of assessment.
1963 c. 25	Finance Act 1963	Section 43(4)(a) for 1970–71 and subsequent years of assessment.
1965 c. 25	Finance Act 1965	In section 54(3) the words "nor section 137(l) of the Income Tax Act 1952" for accounting periods ending in 1970–71 or any subsequent year of assessment. Section 71(1)(b) for 1970–71 and subsequent years of assessment.

==== Part III: Close companies ====
Part III — Close Companies
Citation	Short title	Extent of repeal
1965 c. 25	Finance Act 1965	Section 74. In section 77 subsection (3)(d) and in the proviso to subsection (6) the words from "or below the amount" to the end of the section. In section 78(3) the words "(or amounts treated as such for purposes of section 77 above)". Section 89(5). In Schedule 11, paragraph 9(1)(a). In Schedule 18, in paragraph 6(1), the words "and 'whole-time service director'", paragraph 6(3) and paragraph 9(1)(d).
1966 c. 18	Finance Act 1966	In Schedule 5, in paragraph 18(1)(b), the words from "is not in receipt" to "per annum and", and in paragraph 18(3) the definition of "remuneration".
1967 c. 54	Finance Act 1967	In Schedule 11, in paragraph 9, the words "and paragraph 6(3)" and paragraph (a).

The repeals of section 77(3)(d) of, and paragraph 9(1)(a) of Schedule 11 to, the Finance Act 1965 have effect as respects accounting periods beginning after 15th April 1969, and the repeals in paragraph 18 of Schedule 5 to the Finance Act 1966 have effect from that date. The other repeals made by this Part of this Schedule apply as respects accounting periods ending after the end of March 1969 except so far as section 28 of this act applies to any such accounting period.

==== Part IV: Other income tax and corporation tax repeals ====
Part IV — Other Income Tax and Corporation Tax Repeals
Citation	Short title	Extent of repeal
15 & 16 Geo. 6 & 1 Eliz. 2. c. 10	Income Tax Act 1952	In subsection (1) of section 220, the words from "Where the relevant amount" to the end of the subsection. In section 430, subsections (4) and (5).
8 & 9 Eliz. 2. c. 44	Finance Act 1960	In section 28(11), the proviso, except with respect to dividends received before 30th April 1969.
1963 c. 25	Finance Act 1963	In section 12, subsections (2) and (5).
1964 c. 92	Finance (No. 2) Act 1964	In section 1(2), the words from "and by the substitution" onwards.
1965 c. 25	Finance Act 1965	Section 10(5). Section 65, except with respect to distributions made before 30th April 1969. Schedule 9, except the last four entries. In Schedule 15, paragraph 15(b), except with respect to distributions made before 30th April 1969. Schedule 17, except with respect to distributions made before 30th April 1969.
1966 c. 18	Finance Act 1966	In Schedule 5, paragraph 17, except with respect to distributions made before 30th April 1969.
1967 c. 54	Finance Act 1967	In section 16, subsection (2), in subsection (3) the words from "for the year" to "assessment" and subsection (5), except in so far as it preserves the effect of any provision of section 218 of the Income Tax Act 1952. In Schedule 11, except with respect to distributions made before 30th April 1969, sub-paragraphs (4) and (5) of paragraph 3 and paragraph 4.
1968 c. 44	Finance Act 1968	Section 14(1). Section 27, except with respect to distributions made before 30th April 1969.
1969 c. 46	Family Law Reform Act 1969	In Schedule 2, paragraph 3.
1969 c. 39	Age of Majority (Scotland) Act 1969	In Schedule 2, paragraph 3.

==== Part V: Estate duty repeals ====
Part V — Estate Duty Repeals
Citation	Short title	Extent of repeal
44 & 45 Vict. c. 12	Customs and Inland Revenue Act 1881	Section 38(2)(c).
52 & 53 Vict. c. 7	Customs and Inland Revenue Act 1889	In section 11(1), the paragraph beginning "The description of property marked (c)".
57 & 58 Vict. c. 30	Finance Act 1894	In section 1, the words "at the graduated rates hereinafter mentioned". Section 2(1)(d). In section 4, the words "rate of" and "at the proper graduated rate" and the words from "Provided" onwards. Section 5(3). In section 7(6), the words "rate of" in both places where they occur. Section 7(7). In section 8(7), the words "at the appropriate rate". In section 11(2), the words "the rate of" and "at that rate". In section 11(3), the words "rate of" and "at" and the word "rate" where secondly occurring. Section 15(1) and (3). In section 16(3) as substituted by section 33(1) of the Finance Act 1954, paragraph (b) from "together" onwards, the words "any settled property other than" and the words "other than" where secondly occurring. Section 22(1)(f). In section 22(2)(a), the words from "including" to "or not". Section 23(12), (14), (15) and (16).
59 & 60 Vict. c. 28	Finance Act 1896	Sections 14, 15(4) and 16.
63 & 64 Vict. c. 7	Finance Act 1900	Section 12.
10 Edw. 7 & 1 Geo. 5. c. 8	Finance (1909–10) Act 1910	Section 57.
4 & 5 Geo. 5. c. 10	Finance Act 1914	Section 13(1).
15 & 16 Geo. 5. c. 36	Finance Act 1925	In section 23(1), the words from "instead" to "Act" where next occurring. Section 23(4) from "and" onwards.
24 & 25 Geo. 5. c. 32	Finance Act 1934	Section 28.
25 & 26 Geo. 5. c. 24	Finance Act 1935	Section 33.
1 Edw. 8 & 1 Geo. 6. c. 54	Finance Act 1937	In section 31(3), the words "or a benefit accrues therefrom" wherever those words occur, the words "or the benefit accruing on the death, as the case may be" and the words "or a benefit accruing".
1 & 2 Geo. 6. c. 46	Finance Act 1938	Sections 47(7) and 48.
2 & 3 Geo. 6. c. 41	Finance Act 1939	In section 30, subsection (1) (except for the purposes of the reference thereto in section 31(1)) and subsections (2) and (4). In section 31(2), the words "property deemed to be included in the".
3 & 4 Geo. 6. c. 29	Finance Act 1940	Section 43. Section 45(3). In section 51(2A) as inserted by section 38 of the Finance Act 1944, the words from "(not being" to "office)". Section 52. In section 56(2), the words from "in" where first occurring to "Act, or" where first occurring, the words "disposition or determination or", the words "of the person who had the interest or", the words "and of any benefit to him", the words "in the said subsection (2) or" and the words "as the case may be".
7 & 8 Geo. 6. c. 23	Finance Act 1944	In section 38, in the subsection (2A) inserted thereby, the words from "(not being" to "office)". In Part II of Schedule 4, paragraph 4.
12, 13 & 14 Geo. 6. c. 47	Finance Act 1949	Section 28(1) from "and" onwards.
14 Geo. 6. c. 15	Finance Act 1950	Section 43. Section 45. Schedule 7.
2 & 3 Eliz. 2. c. 44	Finance Act 1954	In section 33(1), the words from "together" to "on that settled property)", the words "any settled property other than" and the words "other than" where secondly occurring. Section 33(2) and (3).
4 & 5 Eliz. 2. c. 54	Finance Act 1956	In section 19, subsection (4) and paragraph (a) of subsection (7). Sections 32 and 35.
5 & 6 Eliz. 2. c. 49	Finance Act 1957	Section 38(10). In section 38(11), the words "or under section thirteen of the Finance Act 1914". In section 38(12), in paragraph (a) the word "and", and paragraph (b). Section 38(16) from "and" onwards. Section 39(1).
6 & 7 Eliz. 2. c. 56	Finance Act 1958	Section 28.
7 & 8 Eliz. 2. c. 58	Finance Act 1959	In section 34(3), the words "be deemed to" and the words "so deemed to have passed".
8 & 9 Eliz. 2. c. 44	Finance Act 1960	In section 64(2), paragraphs (b), (c) and (d). In section 64(4), the word "or" at the end of paragraph (b), and paragraph (c).
1966 c. 18	Finance Act 1966	Section 40. In section 41(2)(b), the words "of aggregation and".
1968 c. 44	Finance Act 1968	Sections 38 and 39. In Schedule 14, so much of paragraph 1 as amends the Finance Act 1894, section 43(2) of the Finance Act 1940, the Finance Act 1950, or the Finance Act 1958, and paragraph 2(2) and (3).

Subject to section 40(2) of this act, this Part of this Schedule has effect in relation to any death occurring after 15th April 1969.

==== Part VI: Capital gains repeals ====
Part VI — Capital Gains Repeals
Citation	Short title	Extent of repeal
10 & 11 Eliz. 2. c. 44	Finance Act 1962	In Schedule 9, paragraph 14.
1965 c. 25	Finance Act 1965	Section 24(8). Section 25(5)(b). In Schedule 7, paragraph 8.
1967 c. 54	Finance Act 1967	In Schedule 13, paragraph 11. In Schedule 14, paragraph 11.
1968 c. 44	Finance Act 1968	In Schedule 12, paragraph 16 and, except with respect to distributions made before 30th April 1969, paragraph 17 and the proviso to paragraph 20(1).

The repeals of sections 24(8) and 25(5)(b) of the Finance Act 1965 do not have effect in the case of deaths occurring before 6th April 1969.

==== Part VII: Selective employment tax repeals ====
Part VII — Selective Employment Tax Repeals
Citation	Short title	Extent of repeal
1968 c. 44	Finance Act 1968	Section 51(1) and (3). In section 51(4), the words from "shall be" to "and".

==== Part VIII: Consolidation repeals having effect from 6 April 1970 ====
Part VIII — Consolidation Repeals Having Effect from 6th April 1970
Citation	Short title	Extent of repeal
15 & 16 Geo. 6 & 1 Eliz. 2. c. 10	Income Tax Act 1952	Section 12(4). Section 51. Section 52(2)(d). Section 59(1). In section 59(3)(b), the words "or to subscribe the oath". Section 62. Section 63(1). In section 66(1), the words "under Schedule D or Schedule E". In section 165(1), the words from "the references" to "body corporate and". In section 229, in subsection (4), from the beginning to "determined and", and subsections (6) and (7). Section 233(3). In section 244(6), from the beginning to "abode, and". In section 247, subsections (1) and (4) as applied by section 28(8) of the Finance Act 1960. In section 359(5), the words "or other proper officer of the Crown". Section 359(6). Section 360(3). In section 362(2), the words following "payment of tax" to the end of the subsection (including the proviso). In section 367(1)(a), the words from "unless the Commissioners" to the end. Section 515(2)(3)(4)(6)(7). In Schedule 8, in paragraph 1(1) of Part I, the words from "within one month" to "shall also".
8 & 9 Eliz. 2. c. 44	Finance Act 1960	In section 28(8), the words "and (4)". In section 51(7), the words "any person nominated for that purpose by". In section 58(6), the words "a person nominated for that purpose by".
1964 c. 37	Income Tax Management Act 1964	Section 5(8). Section 9(12). In section 12(1), the words "other officer of" (twice). In section 12(6), the words from "and in the application" to the end of the subsection. In Schedule 4, paragraph (2). In Schedule 4, the amendments of sections 51, 62(1) and 229(4) of the Income Tax Act 1952, in the amendments of sections 413 and 430 of that Act, and of section 24 of the Finance Act 1962, the words "under section 51 of the Income Tax Act 1952", and in the entry relating to section 507 of the Income Tax Act 1952, the words "to which section 9 of this Act applies".
1965 c. 25	Finance Act 1965	In Schedule 10, paragraph 1(2), and, in paragraph 8(1), the words "or other officer of the Board". In Schedule 12, paragraph 5(2), so far as it relates to section 63(1) of the Income Tax Act 1952.
1966 c. 18	Finance Act 1966	In Schedule 6, sub-paragraphs (2) and (4) of paragraph 6, in paragraph 9(7), the words "any person nominated for that purpose by", paragraphs 11(7) and 17(2), paragraph 20(4) so far as it relates to sections 62 and 63(1) of the Income Tax Act 1952, and paragraph 26.
SI 1952/653	Income Tax (Service of Notices) Regulations 1952	The whole instrument.
SI 1965/433	Income Tax (Surtax etc.) Regulations 1965	The whole instrument.
SI 1967/149	Capital Gains Tax Regulations 1967	Regulations 3, 4, 5 and 10(2).
SI 1967/150	Capital Gains Tax (Service of Notices) Regulations 1967	The whole instrument.

This Part of this Schedule comes into force on 6th April 1970.

==== Part IX: Other consolidation repeals ====
Part IX — Other Consolidation Repeals
Citation	Short title	Extent of repeal
15 & 16 Geo. 6 & 1 Eliz. 2. c. 10	Income Tax Act 1952	Section 72(2)(c). In section 83, paragraph 2 of Schedule B. Section 115(1). In section 117, paragraph 6 of Schedule C. In section 121, in the definition of "dividends" the words "(except in the phrase 'stock dividends or interest')". In section 122, the proviso to paragraph 1 of Schedule D. Section 132(1)(d). In section 137, in paragraph (c), the words "shall be such as may be determined by an inspector and", and in paragraph (i), the words "to the satisfaction of an inspector". Section 169(2)(b). Section 170(5). In section 193, in subsection (2), the words "of Ceylon or of any colony", paragraphs (b) and (c) of subsection (3), and, in subsection (5), from the beginning to "colony; and". In section 214, in subsection (1), the words "for the purpose of having the charge and care of any child of his or", and the words "take such charge or", and subsection (2). Section 222. Section 249(2)(a). In provisos (i) and (ii) to section 258(3), the words "the income of". Section 348(5). Section 352(3). In section 379(4)(c) the words "in which claims for relief under this section are to be made and approved and". In section 439(2) the words "under Schedules C and D". In section 440, in subsections (1) and (2), the words "under Schedules C and D". In section 442, in subsection (2), the words "without deduction of income tax", and, in subsection (3), the words "subsection (2) of" and "becomes chargeable as therein provided". In section 444, in subsections (1) and (2), the words "or society" wherever they occur and subsection (4). In section 445(5), the definition of "dividend". Section 461.
4 & 5 Eliz. 2. c. 54	Finance Act 1956	In the proviso to section 28(1), the words from the first "any person" to "Special Commissioners, and".
5 & 6 Eliz. 2. c. 6	Ghana Independence Act 1957	In Schedule 2, paragraph 1.
5 & 6 Eliz. 2. c. 60	Federation of Malaya Independence Act 1957	In Schedule 1, paragraph 5.
8 & 9 Eliz. 2. c. 44	Finance Act 1960	In section 17(2)(b), the word "fourteen". In section 27, in subsections (4) and (5), the words from "except" to "nineteen hundred and sixty".
8 & 9 Eliz. 2. c. 52	Cyprus Act 1960	In the Schedule, paragraph 7.
8 & 9 Eliz. 2. c. 55	Nigeria Independence Act 1960	In Schedule 2, paragraph 1.
9 & 10 Eliz. 2. c. 16	Sierra Leone Independence Act 1961	In Schedule 3, paragraph 1.
10 & 11 Eliz. 2. c. 1	Tanganyika Independence Act 1961	In Schedule 2, paragraph 1.
10 & 11 Eliz. 2. c. 40	Jamaica Independence Act 1962	In Schedule 2, paragraph 1.
10 & 11 Eliz. 2. c. 44	Finance Act 1962	The proviso to section 10(1). In section 16(1), the definition of "company". Section 22(4). In Schedule 9, paragraph 20.
10 & 11 Eliz. 2. c. 54	Trinidad and Tobago Independence Act 1962	In Schedule 2, paragraph 1.
10 & 11 Eliz. 2. c. 57	Uganda Independence Act 1962	In Schedule 3, paragraph 1.
1963 c. 25	Finance Act 1963	In section 16(6), the words "other payments being". Section 28(2).
1963 c. 54	Kenya Independence Act 1963	In Schedule 2, paragraph 1.
1963 c. 55	Zanzibar Act 1963	In Part I of Schedule 1, paragraph 1.
1964 c. 46	Malawi Independence Act 1964	In Schedule 2, paragraph 1.
1964 c. 65	Zambia Independence Act 1964	In Schedule 1, paragraph 1.
1964 c. 86	Malta Independence Act 1964	In Schedule 2, paragraph 1.
1964 c. 93	Gambia Independence Act 1964	In Schedule 2, paragraph 1.
1965 c. 25	Finance Act 1965	Section 17(3). In section 17(9), the paragraph beginning "This subsection". Section 17(14). Section 18(6). In section 47(5), the words "except references in any provision specially relating to a winding up". Section 54(5) and (7). In section 62(7)(b), the words "and (4)", and from "and with the substitution" to the end of the paragraph. In section 78(5)(a) the words "or to a loan creditor". In Schedule 15, in paragraph 12, the words from "inserted" to "there shall be".
1966 c. 14	Guyana Independence Act 1966	In Schedule 2, paragraph 1.
1966 c. 18	Finance Act 1966	In Schedule 5, in paragraph 3(1), the words "and the exemption conferred by section 6(2) of the Atomic Energy Authority Act 1954", and paragraph 11(2).
1966 c. 23	Botswana Independence Act 1966	In Part I of the Schedule, paragraph 1.
1966 c. 24	Lesotho Independence Act 1966	In Part I of the Schedule, paragraph 1.
1966 c. 29	Singapore Act 1966	In the Schedule, paragraph 6.
1966 c. 37	Barbados Independence Act 1966	In Schedule 2, paragraph 1.
1968 c. 8	Mauritius Independence Act 1968	In Schedule 2, paragraph 1.
1968 c. 44	Finance Act 1968	In section 17(6), the words "and (3)". Section 33(5). In Schedule 10, in paragraph 6(1), the words "on him". In Schedule 13, paragraphs 1(4) and 5(1).
1968 c. 56	Swaziland Independence Act 1968	In the Schedule, paragraph 1.
SR&O 1921/1699	Regulations dated 10th November 1921 made by the Commissioners of Inland Revenue under section 32 of the Finance Act 1921	In Regulation 12, from "and all the provisions" to the second "those claims".
SI 1956/715	Ulster and Colonial Savings Certificates (Income Tax Exemption) Regulations 1956	In Regulation 1, from "Certificates issued under" to the end, and Regulation 2, and the Schedule.

The above repeals of section 132(1)(b) of the Income Tax Act 1952 and section 54(7) of the Finance Act 1965 have effect as respects income tax for the year 1969–70 and subsequent years of assessment, and as respects corporation tax for the financial year 1969 and subsequent financial years. Subject to that, this Part of this Schedule has effect only in relation to tax for years of assessment and companies' accounting periods ending after 5th April 1970.

==== Part X: Obsolete or unnecessary provisions in tax acts ====
Part X — Obsolete or Unnecessary Provisions in Tax Acts
Citation	Short title	Extent of repeal
53 & 54 Vict. c. 21	Inland Revenue Regulation Act 1890	Sections 21, 22 and 35(2) so far as they relate to capital gains tax and corporation tax.
5 & 6 Geo. 5. c. 89	Finance (No. 2) Act 1915	Section 51(1).
15 & 16 Geo. 6 & 1 Eliz. 2. c. 10	Income Tax Act 1952	Section 5(2). In section 12(1), the words "under this Act". In section 17, the words "in the execution of this Act", and the whole section except as respects General Commissioners or Special Commissioners. In section 31(1), the words (after paragraph (b)) from "Where" to the end of the subsection. Section 32. In section 74, in subsection (2) the words "or other peace officer" and "or officer", and in subsection (5) the words "or his deputy" (twice). In section 117, paragraph 7 of Schedule C. In section 122, in paragraph 1 of Schedule D, the words "in each case for every twenty shillings of the annual amount of the profits or gains". Section 124(3). Section 126. In section 132(1), the words (after paragraph (c)) from "and the provisions" to the end of the subsection. In section 156, in paragraph 1A of Schedule E, the words "for every twenty shillings of the amount thereof for the year". Section 157(4). Section 187(1)(b). Section 202(5). In section 223, proviso (i). In section 249, in subsection (3), the words "and any regulations made thereunder", in proviso (b) to subsection (4), the words "or the liquidator of a company", and, in subsection (5), the words from "and where" to the end of the subsection. In section 316, in subsections (1) and (2)(c), the words "on or after the appointed day". In section 317, in subsections (1) to (4), the words "on or after the appointed day". In section 318, in subsections (1) and (2), the words "on or after the appointed day". Section 319. In section 368, the words "(save as herein is excepted)". Section 373(1)(d). In section 392, the words "after the first day of May, nineteen hundred and twenty-two". In section 439(2), proviso (b). In section 442(4), the words from "in such form" to "prescribe". Section 444(3). In section 457(1), the words "bounty at the commencement or". Section 457(5)(b). Section 463(5). In section 469, in subsections (1) and (2), the words "on or after the tenth day of April, nineteen hundred and fifty-one". Section 473(2)(b). Section 479(2). In section 495(5), the words from "In this subsection 'collector'" to the end of the subsection. In section 498(1), proviso (b). In section 514, in subsections (1) and (2) the word "charge,", and, in subsection (3), the words "or charge made upon an assessment" and "certificate of charge or" and the proviso. Section 525(2)(e). Section 528(3)(d). Section 529(3) and (4). Section 530(1) and (2). In Schedule 9, paragraphs 1 and 2. In paragraph 1 of Schedule 16, in sub-paragraph (1) the definition of "foreign income tax", sub-paragraph (2) and in sub-paragraph (3) the words "or foreign income tax". In Part II of Schedule 18, in paragraph 2(1), the words (after (b)) from "and the provisions" to the end, and paragraph 2(3). In paragraph 1(1) of Schedule 19, in the definition of "payment", the words "on or after the sixth day of April, nineteen hundred and forty-five", and, in the definition of "contribution", the words from "but does not" to "forty-five". In Schedule 20, in paragraph 2(3), the proviso. Schedule 22, so far as not repealed. In Part II of Schedule 23, paragraphs 4 and 5. In Schedule 24, in the first paragraph, the words "value of property or".
15 & 16 Geo. 6 & 1 Eliz. 2. c. 33	Finance Act 1952	Section 17. Section 18(6)(c). In section 18(7), the words from "and notwithstanding" to the end of the subsection. In section 67(1), the proviso.
1 & 2 Eliz. 2. c. 34	Finance Act 1953	Section 25(8).
2 & 3 Eliz. 2. c. 44	Finance Act 1954	Section 25.
4 & 5 Eliz. 2. c. 17	Finance (No. 2) Act 1955	In section 3(1), the proviso.
4 & 5 Eliz. 2. c. 54	Finance Act 1956	In section 24(2)(b), the words from "(and without" to the end of paragraph (b). Section 27(6).
7 & 8 Eliz. 2. c. 58	Finance Act 1959	In section 23(1), the words "on or after the eighth day of April, nineteen hundred and fifty-nine".
8 & 9 Eliz. 2. c. 44	Finance Act 1960	Section 33(4) and (5). In section 63(1), the definitions of "assessment" and "Summary Jurisdiction Acts (Northern Ireland)". In section 69(1), the words "(including the regulations made thereunder)". In section 72, the proviso to subsection (1) and subsection (10).
9 & 10 Eliz. 2. c. 36	Finance Act 1961	In section 28(2), the words "and may, if not final, be amended".
10 & 11 Eliz. 2. c. 44	Finance Act 1962	In section 12(9), the words from "and without prejudice" to the end of the subsection. In section 16(4), the words "whose business consists mainly in the making of investments", and the words from "and in the case" to the end of the subsection. Section 17.
1963 c. 25	Finance Act 1963	In section 29(1), from the beginning to "vocation; and".
1965 c. 25	Finance Act 1965	Section 17(12). In section 49(7), the words from "and the Board" to the end of the subsection. Section 55(4). Section 69(4). Section 78(7)(c). Section 80(5). In Schedule 15, paragraph 16.
1966 c. 18	Finance Act 1966	Section 29(12)(d).
1967 c. 54	Finance Act 1967	In section 39(2), the words "on a claim being made to them for the purpose". In paragraph 5(7) of Schedule 11, the words "the Committee of Ways and Means of the House of Commons, or of".
1968 c. 3	Capital Allowances Act 1968	In Schedule 12, paragraph 3(4).
1968 c. 44	Finance Act 1968	In Schedule 10, paragraph 7.
