= List of acts of the Parliament of the United Kingdom from 1970 =

This is a list of acts of the Parliament of the United Kingdom passed in 1970.

Acts passed since 1963 are cited by calendar year, as opposed to the convention used for earlier acts of citing the regnal year(s) in which the relevant parliamentary session was held. Each act passed in a respective year is given a chapter number (abbreviated "c."), denoted by Arabic numerals in the case of public general acts, lowercase Roman numerals in the case of local acts, or italicised Arabic numerals in the case of personal acts. These run as separate series.

143 acts of Parliament were passed in 1970: 58 public general acts and 85 local acts.

indicates that an act has been transcribed on Wikisource, indicates that an act is available to view at legislation.gov.uk, and indicates the location of the original act in the Parliamentary Archives.

== Public general acts ==
Short title	Citation	Royal assent
Long title
Consolidated Fund Act 1970 (repealed)	1970 c. 1	29 January 1970
An Act to apply certain sums out of the Consolidated Fund to the service of the years ending on 31st March 1970 and 1971. (Repealed by Appropriation (No. 2) Act 1974 (c. 31))
Industrial Development (Ships) Act 1970 (repealed)	1970 c. 2	29 January 1970
An Act to restrict the power of the Minister of Technology to make grants under section 5(1) of the Industrial Development Act 1966 (Note: Industrial Development Act 1966 (c. 34)) and enable the Parliament of Northern Ireland to restrict, by reference to certain matters, the power of the Ministry of Commerce for Northern Ireland to make grants under section 6(1) of the Industrial Investment (General Assistance) Act (Northern Ireland) 1966. (Note: Industrial Investment (General Assistance) Act (Northern Ireland) 1966 (c. 41 (N.I.))) (Repealed by Statute Law (Repeals) Act 1993 (c. 50))
Food and Drugs (Milk) Act 1970 (repealed)	1970 c. 3	29 January 1970
An Act to authorise the treatment of milk by the application of steam. (Repealed by Food Act 1984 (c. 30))
Valuation for Rating (Scotland) Act 1970	1970 c. 4	26 February 1970
An Act to make provision with respect to the partial derating of buildings and associated land in Scotland used for the purpose of the keeping or breeding of livestock.
Housing (Amendment) (Scotland) Act 1970	1970 c. 5	26 February 1970
An Act to amend section 25(1) of the Housing (Financial Provisions) (Scotland) Act 1968. (Note: Housing (Financial Provisions) (Scotland) Act 1968 (c. 31))
Rural Water Supplies and Sewerage (Scotland) Act 1970 (repealed)	1970 c. 6	26 February 1970
An Act to increase the limit on the contributions payable to local authorities in Scotland under the Rural Water Supplies and Sewerage Act 1944. (Note: Rural Water Supplies and Sewerage Act 1944 (7 & 8 Geo. 6. c. 26)) (Repealed by Local Government etc. (Scotland) Act 1994 (c. 39))
Local Employment Act 1970	1970 c. 7	26 February 1970
An Act to provide for the exercise, in relation to intermediate areas, of certain of the functions under the Local Employment Acts 1960 to 1966 of the Minister of Technology and other persons and, in relation to derelict land clearance areas, of the powers conferred by section 20 of the Industrial Development Act 1966; to provide for the making of grants out of moneys provided by Parliament towards costs incurred by councils in connection with the bringing into use, or the improvement of the appearance of, derelict, neglected or unsightly land; to withdraw the payments additional to refund of selective employment tax which are made under section 1(1)(a) to (d) of the Selective Employment Payments Act 1966, (Note: Selective Employment Payments Act 1966 (c. 32)) and to reduce correspondingly the amount of payments to public bodies under section 3 of that Act; to amend section 60 of the Landlord and Tenant Act 1954; (Note: Landlord and Tenant Act 1954 (2 & 3 Eliz. 2. c. 56)) and for purposes connected with the matters aforesaid.
Insolvency Services (Accounting and Investment) Act 1970 (repealed)	1970 c. 8	26 February 1970
An Act to amend the law with respect to the Bankruptcy Estates Account and the Companies Liquidation Account and the investment of balances therein, and with respect to the fixing and disposal of fees in bankruptcy and winding-up proceedings; and for purposes connected with those matters. (Repealed by Insolvency Act 1986 (c. 45))
Taxes Management Act 1970	1970 c. 9	12 March 1970
An Act to consolidate certain of the enactments relating to income tax, capital gains tax and corporation tax, including certain enactments relating also to other taxes.
Income and Corporation Taxes Act 1970 (repealed)	1970 c. 10	12 March 1970
An Act to consolidate certain of the enactments relating to income tax and corporation tax, including certain enactments relating also to other taxes. (Repealed by Taxation of Chargeable Gains Act 1992 (c. 12))
Sea Fish Industry Act 1970	1970 c. 11	12 March 1970
An Act to consolidate certain enactments relating to the sea fishing industry and to repeal certain obsolete enactments relating to herring.
Consolidated Fund (No. 2) Act 1970 (repealed)	1970 c. 12	24 March 1970
An Act to apply certain sums out of the Consolidated Fund to the service of the years ending on 31st March 1969, 1970 and 1971. (Repealed by Appropriation (No. 2) Act 1974 (c. 31))
Game Act 1970	1970 c. 13	26 March 1970
An Act to amend the Game Act 1831; (Note: Game Act 1831 (1 & 2 Will. 4. c. 32)) and to repeal section 10 of the Revenue Act 1911. (Note: Revenue Act 1911 (1 & 2 Geo. 5. c. 2))
Education (School Milk) Act 1970 (repealed)	1970 c. 14	26 March 1970
An Act to include among the children for whom school milk is to be provided junior pupils at schools designated as secondary schools under section 1 of the Education Act 1964. (Note: Education Act 1964 (c. 82)) (Repealed by Education (Milk) Act 1971 (c. 74))
Export Guarantees and Payments Act 1970 (repealed)	1970 c. 15	16 April 1970
An Act to amend the Export Guarantees Act 1968, (Note: Export Guarantees Act 1968 (c. 26)) and to confer on the Board of Trade power to make grants for the purpose of reducing costs incurred or to be incurred, under export contracts or contracts related to export contracts, by persons carrying on business or other activities abroad. (Repealed by Export Guarantees Act 1975 (c. 38))
National Health Service Contributions Act 1970	1970 c. 16	15 May 1970
An Act to increase contributions payable by employers under the National Health Service Contributions Act 1965. (Note: National Health Service Contributions Act 1965 (c. 54))
Proceedings Against Estates Act 1970 (repealed)	1970 c. 17	15 May 1970
An Act to repeal section 1(3) of the Law Reform (Miscellaneous Provisions) Act 1934 (Note: Law Reform (Miscellaneous Provisions) Act 1934 (24 & 25 Geo. 5. c. 41)) and to make provision for facilitating proceedings against the estates of deceased persons. (Repealed by Statute Law (Repeals) Act 1986 (c. 12))
Guyana Republic Act 1970	1970 c. 18	15 May 1970
An Act to make provision as to the operation of the law in relation to Guyana as a republic within the Commonwealth.
General Rate Act 1970 (repealed)	1970 c. 19	15 May 1970
An Act to make provision as to the assessment of dwelling-houses for the purposes of valuation lists under the General Rate Act 1967 (Note: General Rate Act 1967 (c. 9)) by reference to evidence as to the rents at which other dwelling-houses have been let or as to the relationship between those rents and the gross values of those other dwelling-houses in the current valuation lists. (Repealed by Local Government Finance Act 1988 (c. 41))
Roads (Scotland) Act 1970	1970 c. 20	15 May 1970
An Act to make certain amendments to the law relating to roads and streets in Scotland, and to provide for the use of appliances or vehicles on footways and footpaths for certain purposes.
New Forest Act 1970	1970 c. 21	15 May 1970
An Act to make further provision for the New Forest.
Tonga Act 1970	1970 c. 22	15 May 1970
An Act to make provision in connection with the attainment by Tonga of fully responsible status within the Commonwealth.
Road Traffic (Disqualification) Act 1970 (repealed)	1970 c. 23	15 May 1970
An Act to amend the law relating to disqualification for the offence of driving while disqualified. (Repealed by Road Traffic Act 1972 (c. 20))
Finance Act 1970	1970 c. 24	29 May 1970
An Act to grant certain duties, to alter other duties, and to amend the law relating to the National Debt and the Public Revenue, and to make further provision in connection with Finance.
Appropriation Act 1970 (repealed)	1970 c. 25	29 May 1970
An Act to apply a sum out of the Consolidated Fund to the service of the year ending on 31st March 1971, and to appropriate the supplies granted in this Session of Parliament. (Repealed by Appropriation (No. 2) Act 1974 (c. 31))
Films Act 1970 (repealed)	1970 c. 26	29 May 1970
An Act to amend the enactments relating to the financing and exhibition of films. (Repealed by Films Act 1985 (c. 21))
Fishing Vessels (Safety Provisions) Act 1970	1970 c. 27	29 May 1970
An Act to make further provision for the safety of fishing vessels.
Local Government (Footpaths and Open Spaces) (Scotland) Act 1970	1970 c. 28	29 May 1970
An Act to confer on local authorities in Scotland power to take over the control and maintenance of certain footpaths, and to construct and maintain certain footpaths; to authorise local authorities in Scotland to acquire or maintain certain open spaces; and for connected purposes.
Parish Councils and Burial Authorities (Miscellaneous Provisions) Act 1970	1970 c. 29	29 May 1970
An Act to amend the law relating to the provision by parish councils of signs and the administration of burial grounds by burial authorities, and for matters connected therewith.
Conservation of Seals Act 1970	1970 c. 30	29 May 1970
An Act to provide for the protection and conservation of seals in England and Wales and Scotland and in the adjacent territorial waters.
Administration of Justice Act 1970	1970 c. 31	29 May 1970
An Act to make further provision about the courts (including assizes), their business, jurisdiction and procedure; to enable a High Court judge to accept appointment as arbitrator or umpire under an arbitration agreement; to amend the law respecting the enforcement of debt and other liabilities; to amend section 106 of the Rent Act 1968; and for miscellaneous purposes connected with the administration of justice.
Riding Establishments Act 1970	1970 c. 32	29 May 1970
An Act to confer further powers on local authorities with respect to the licensing of riding establishments and to amend the Riding Establishments Act 1964. (Note: Riding Establishments Act 1964 (c. 70))
Law Reform (Miscellaneous Provisions) Act 1970	1970 c. 33	29 May 1970
An Act to abolish actions for breach of promise of marriage and make provision with respect to the property of, and gifts between, persons who have been engaged to marry; to abolish the right of a husband to claim damages for adultery with his wife; to abolish actions for the enticement or harbouring of a spouse, or for the enticement, seduction or harbouring of a child; to make provision with respect to the maintenance of survivors of void marriages; and for purposes connected with the matters aforesaid.
Marriage (Registrar General's Licence) Act 1970	1970 c. 34	29 May 1970
An Act to permit marriages on unregistered premises; and for purposes connected therewith.
Conveyancing and Feudal Reform (Scotland) Act 1970	1970 c. 35	29 May 1970
An Act to provide as respects Scotland for the variation and discharge of certain obligations relating to land; to facilitate the allocation of feuduties and ground annuals; to reduce the period of positive prescription of 20 years to 10 years; to provide for a new form of heritable security; to make certain amendments to the existing law relating to heritable securities; to make certain other amendments to the law relating to conveyancing; to abolish the rights of pre-emption of heritors in respect of glebes; to amend the Lands Tribunal Act 1949; (Note: Lands Tribunal Act 1949 (12, 13 & 14 Geo. 6. c. 42)) and for connected purposes.
Merchant Shipping Act 1970	1970 c. 36	29 May 1970
An Act to make fresh provision in place of certain enactments relating to merchant ships and seamen and to repeal some of those enactments without replacement; to make further provision relating to merchant ships and seamen; and for purposes connected therewith.
Republic of The Gambia Act 1970	1970 c. 37	29 May 1970
An Act to make provision in connection with The Gambia becoming a republic within the Commonwealth.
Building (Scotland) Act 1970 (repealed)	1970 c. 38	29 May 1970
An Act to Amend the Building (Scotland) Act 1959, (Note: Building (Scotland) Act 1959 (7 & 8 Eliz. 2. c. 24)) and for purposes connected therewith. (Repealed by Building (Scotland) Act 2003 (asp 8))
Local Authorities (Goods and Services) Act 1970	1970 c. 39	29 May 1970
An Act to make further provision with respect to the supply of goods and services by local authorities to certain public bodies, and for purposes connected therewith.
Agriculture Act 1970	1970 c. 40	29 May 1970
An Act to make provision with respect to agriculture and related matters and with respect to flood warning systems; and to amend the Diseases of Animals Act 1950.
Equal Pay Act 1970 (repealed)	1970 c. 41	29 May 1970
An Act to prevent discrimination, as regards terms and conditions of employment, between men and women. (Repealed by Equality Act 2010 (c. 15))
Local Authority Social Services Act 1970	1970 c. 42	29 May 1970
An Act to make further provision with respect to the organisation, management and administration of local authority social services; to amend the Health Visiting and Social Work (Training) Act 1962; (Note: Health Visiting and Social Work (Training) Act 1962 (10 & 11 Eliz. 2. c. 33)) and for connected purposes.
Trees Act 1970	1970 c. 43	29 May 1970
An Act to amend the law relating to the making of tree preservation orders and the grant of felling licences.
Chronically Sick and Disabled Persons Act 1970	1970 c. 44	29 May 1970
An Act to make further provision with respect to the welfare of chronically sick and disabled persons; and for connected purposes.
Matrimonial Proceedings and Property Act 1970	1970 c. 45	29 May 1970
An Act to make fresh provision for empowering the court in matrimonial proceedings to make orders ordering either spouse to make financial provision for, or transfer property to, the other spouse or a child of the family, orders for the variation of ante-nuptial and post-nuptial settlements, orders for the custody and education of children and orders varying, discharging or suspending orders made in such proceedings; to make other amendments of the law relating to matrimonial proceedings; to abolish the right to claim restitution of conjugal rights; to declare what interest in property is acquired by a spouse who contributes to its improvement; to make provision as to a spouse's rights of occupation under section 1 of the Matrimonial Homes Act 1967 (Note: Matrimonial Homes Act 1967 (c. 75)) in certain cases; to extend section 17 of the Married Women's Property Act 1882 (Note: Married Women's Property Act 1882 (45 & 46 Vict. c. 75)) and section 7 of the Matrimonial Causes (Property and Maintenance) Act 1958; (Note: Matrimonial Causes (Property and Maintenance) Act 1958 (6 & 7 Eliz. 2. c. 35)) to amend the law about the property of a person whose marriage is the subject of a decree of judicial separation dying intestate; to abolish the agency of necessity of a wife; and for purposes connected with the matters aforesaid.
Radiological Protection Act 1970 (repealed)	1970 c. 46	29 May 1970
An Act to provide for the establishment of a National Radiological Protection Board and an Advisory Committee, with functions concerning the protection of people from radiation hazards; and for connected purposes. (Repealed by Health Protection Agency Act 2004 (c. 17))
Indecent Advertisements (Amendment) Act 1970 (repealed)	1970 c. 47	29 May 1970
An Act to amend the Indecent Advertisements Act 1889. (Note: Indecent Advertisements Act 1889 (52 & 53 Vict. c. 18)) (Repealed by Indecent Displays (Control) Act 1981 (c. 42))
Appropriation (No. 2) Act 1970 (repealed)	1970 c. 48	23 July 1970
An Act to apply a sum out of the Consolidated Fund to the service of the year ending on 31st March 1971, and to appropriate the supplies granted in this Session of Parliament. (Repealed by Appropriation (No. 2) Act 1974 (c. 31))
International Monetary Fund Act 1970 (repealed)	1970 c. 49	23 July 1970
An Act to enable effect to be given to a proposed increase in the United Kingdom's quota of the International Monetary Fund and to provide for certain loans to that Fund to be made out of the National Loans Fund instead of the Consolidated Fund. (Repealed by International Monetary Fund Act 1979 (c. 29))
Fiji Independence Act 1970	1970 c. 50	23 July 1970
An Act to make provision for, and in connection with, the attainment by Fiji of fully responsible status within the Commonwealth.
National Insurance Act 1970 or the National Insurance (Old persons' and widows' pensions and attendance allowance) Act 1970 (Note: The original short title of the National Insurance Act 1970 was the National Insurance (Old persons' and widows' pensions and attendance allowance) Act 1970, but this was amended by the National Insurance Act 1972 (c. 57) on 11 August 1972.)	1970 c. 51	23 July 1970
An Act to provide for retirement pension and widow's benefit under the National Insurance Act 1965 (Note: National Insurance Act 1965 (c. 51)) for or in respect of persons over pensionable age on 5th July 1948; to reduce from fifty to forty the qualifying age for widow's pension under section 28 of that Act and to relax further the conditions for such a pension and for a wife's retirement pension by virtue of her husband's insurance; to make provision for attendance allowance and the establishment and functions of an Attendance Allowance Board; and for purposes connected with the matters aforesaid.
Education (Handicapped Children) Act 1970 (repealed)	1970 c. 52	23 July 1970
An Act to make provision, as respects England and Wales, for discontinuing the classification of handicapped children as unsuitable for education at school, and for purposes connected therewith. (Repealed by Education Act 1996 (c. 56))
Harbours (Amendment) Act 1970	1970 c. 53	23 July 1970
An Act to repeal section 13(1) of the Harbours Act 1964 (Note: Harbours Act 1964 (c. 40)) and impose a limit on future loans under section 11 of that Act.
Income and Corporation Taxes (No. 2) Act 1970 (repealed)	1970 c. 54	17 December 1970
An Act to fix the standard rate of income tax for the year 1971–72 and make an alteration in the marginal relief for persons with small incomes; and to reduce the rate of corporation tax for the financial year 1969. (Repealed by Income and Corporation Taxes Act 1988 (c. 1))
Family Income Supplements Act 1970	1970 c. 55	17 December 1970
An Act to provide for the payment of a new benefit for certain families with small incomes; and for purposes connected therewith.
Contingencies Fund Act 1970	1970 c. 56	17 December 1970
An Act to make further provision with respect to the Civil Contingencies Fund.
Town and Country Planning Regulations (London) (Indemnity) Act 1970 (repealed)	1970 c. 57	17 December 1970
An Act to grant an indemnity in respect of the delay in laying before Parliament certain regulations made under section 24 of the London Government Act 1963, (Note: London Government Act 1963 (c. 33)) and to continue in force the provision whereby regulations under that section are subject to annulment in accordance with the Statutory Instruments Act 1946. (Note: Statutory Instruments Act 1946 (9 & 10 Geo. 6. c. 36)) (Repealed by Statute Law (Repeals) Act 1976 (c. 16))
Expiring Laws Continuance Act 1970	1970 c. 58	17 December 1970
An Act to continue certain expiring laws.

== Local acts ==
Short title	Citation	Royal assent
Long title
Glasgow Corporation Order Confirmation Act 1970	1970 c. i	26 February 1970
An Act to confirm a Provisional Order under the Private Legislation Procedure (Scotland) Act 1936, (Note: Private Legislation Procedure (Scotland) Act 1936 (26 Geo. 5 & 1 Edw. 8. c. 52)) relating to Glasgow Corporation.
	Glasgow Corporation Order 1970 Provisional Order to confer on the Corporation of the city of Glasgow powers to acquire lands and to construct works; to remove restrictions on the provision by the Corporation of parking places in buildings used for other purposes; to make further provision with respect to the local government of the city; and for other purposes.	
Regent, Royal and Carlton Terrace Gardens, Edinburgh Order Confirmation Act 1970	1970 c. ii	15 May 1970
An Act to confirm a Provisional Order under the Private Legislation Procedure (Scotland) Act 1936, relating to Regent, Royal and Carlton Terrace Gardens, Edinburgh.
	Regent, Royal and Carlton Terrace Gardens, Edinburgh Order 1970 Provisional Order to amend the provisions of a contract of feu relating to the Regent, Royal and Carlton Terrace Gardens, Edinburgh, with respect to annual assessments and admissions to the gardens; and for other purposes.	
Royal Bank of Scotland Order Confirmation Act 1970	1970 c. iii	15 May 1970
An Act to confirm a Provisional Order under the Private Legislation Procedure (Scotland) Act 1936, relating to the Royal Bank of Scotland.
	Royal Bank of Scotland Order 1970 Provisional Order to repeal certain provisions of the Royal Charters granted to The Royal Bank of Scotland; to repeal the Royal Bank of Scotland Acts 1873 to 1968; to confer powers on The Royal Bank of Scotland Limited with respect to the carrying on of its business and the regulation of its affairs; and to confirm certain parts of an Interlocutor of the Court of Session dated 21st March, 1969; and for other purposes.	
Basingstoke Corporation Act 1970	1970 c. iv	15 May 1970
An Act to confer powers upon the mayor, aldermen and burgesses of the borough of Basingstoke with regard to the raising of money; and for other purposes.
Australia and New Zealand Banking Group Act 1970	1970 c. v	15 May 1970
An Act to provide for the transfer to Australia and New Zealand Banking Group Limited of the undertakings of Australia and New Zealand Bank Limited and The English, Scottish and Australian Bank, Limited and for other purposes incidental thereto and consequential thereon and to provide for the incorporation of Australia and New Zealand Savings Bank Limited in the State of Victoria in the Commonwealth of Australia, for the cesser of application to that company of provisions of the Companies Acts 1948 to 1967 consequent upon such incorporation; and for other purposes incidental thereto.
Warwickshire County Council Act 1970 (repealed)	1970 c. vi	15 May 1970
An Act to confer further powers on the Warwickshire County Council in relation to the finances of the county; and for other purposes. (Repealed by West Midlands County Council Act 1980 (c. xi))
Welland and Nene (Empingham Reservoir) and Mid-Northamptonshire Water Act 1970	1970 c. vii	15 May 1970
An Act to provide for the conservation of the water resources of the area of the Welland and Nene River Authority by the construction of a reservoir and other waterworks by the Authority; to authorise the Mid-Northamptonshire Water Board to construct waterworks; to authorise the Welland and Nene River Authority and the Mid-Northamptonshire Water Board to acquire lands and rights; to confer further powers on the Mid-Northamptonshire Water Board with regard to their water undertaking, including increased charging powers; and for other purposes.
Doncaster Corporation Act 1970 (repealed)	1970 c. viii	15 May 1970
An Act to confer further powers on the mayor, aldermen and burgesses of the county borough of Doncaster in relation to the finances of the borough; and for other purposes. (Repealed by Statute Law (Repeals) Act 1989 (c. 43))
Newport Corporation Act 1970	1970 c. ix	15 May 1970
An Act to confer further powers on the mayor, aldermen and burgesses of the county borough of Newport in relation to the finances of the county borough; and for other purposes.
Huddersfield Corporation Act 1970 (repealed)	1970 c. x	15 May 1970
An Act to confer further powers on the mayor, aldermen and burgesses of the borough of Huddersfield in relation to the superannuation fund maintained by the said mayor, aldermen and burgesses and in relation to the finances of that borough; and for other purposes. (Repealed by West Yorkshire Act 1980 (c. xiv))
Bolton Corporation Act 1970	1970 c. xi	15 May 1970
An Act to confer further powers on the mayor, aldermen and burgesses of the county borough of Bolton in relation to the finances of the borough; to make further provision for the local government and improvement of the borough; and for other purposes.
Hampshire County Council Act 1970	1970 c. xii	15 May 1970
An Act to confer further powers on the Hampshire County Council in relation to the finances of the administrative county of Hampshire; and for other purposes.
Havering Corporation Act 1970	1970 c. xiii	15 May 1970
An Act to confer further powers on the mayor, aldermen and burgesses of the London borough of Havering in relation to the development of land; and for other purposes.
Leicestershire County Council Act 1970 (repealed)	1970 c. xiv	15 May 1970
An Act to make further provision for the finances and local government of the administrative county of Leicestershire; and for other purposes. (Repealed by Leicestershire Act 1985 (c. xvii))
Swansea Corporation Act 1970	1970 c. xv	15 May 1970
An Act to confer further powers on the mayor, aldermen and citizens of the city of Swansea in relation to the finances of the city; and for other purposes.
Barclays Bank D.C.O. Act 1970 (repealed)	1970 c. xvi	15 May 1970
An Act to increase the maximum permitted capital of Barclays Bank D.C.O.; and for other purposes. (Repealed by Barclays Bank International Act 1974 (c. ix))
Wallasey Corporation Act 1970 (repealed)	1970 c. xvii	15 May 1970
An Act to confer further powers on the mayor, aldermen and burgesses of the borough of Wallasey in relation to the superannuation fund maintained by the said mayor, aldermen and burgesses and in relation to the finances of that borough; and for other purposes.
Flintshire County Council Act 1970 (repealed)	1970 c. xviii	15 May 1970
An Act to confer further powers on the Flintshire County Council in relation to lands and finance; and for other purposes. (Repealed by Clwyd County Council Act 1985 (c. xliv))
British Transport Docks Order Confirmation Act 1970	1970 c. xix	29 May 1970
An Act to confirm a Provisional Order under the Private Legislation Procedure (Scotland) Act 1936, relating to British Transport Docks.
	British Transport Docks Order 1970 Provisional Order to transfer certain statutory obligations and liabilities of the British Transport Docks Board in relation to Tayport harbour to James Donaldson and Sons Limited.	
Coatbridge Burgh Order Confirmation Act 1970	1970 c. xx	29 May 1970
An Act to confirm a Provisional Order under the Private Legislation Procedure (Scotland) Act 1936, relating to Coatbridge Burgh.
	Coatbridge Burgh Order 1970 Provisional Order to confer further powers on the Town Council of the burgh of Coatbridge with respect to the borrowing of money and the finances of the said burgh.	
Somerset County Council Act 1970	1970 c. xxi	29 May 1970
An Act to confer further powers on the Somerset County Council in relation to finance and land; and for other purposes.
Birmingham Corporation Act 1970 (repealed)	1970 c. xxii	29 May 1970
An Act to confer powers upon the lord mayor, aldermen and citizens of the city of Birmingham with regard to finance and local government; and for other purposes. (Repealed by West Midlands County Council Act 1980 (c. xi))
Gosport Corporation Act 1970	1970 c. xxiii	29 May 1970
An Act to confer further powers upon the mayor, aldermen and burgesses of the borough of Gosport; to make further provision for the improvement, local government and finance of the borough; and for other purposes.
Huntingdon and Peterborough County Council Act 1970	1970 c. xxiv	29 May 1970
An Act to confer further powers on the Huntingdon and Peterborough County Council and on local authorities in the administrative county of Huntingdon and Peterborough in relation to lands and highways and the local government, improvement, health and finances of the county; and for other purposes.
West Riding County Council Act 1970 (repealed)	1970 c. xxv	29 May 1970
An Act to confer further powers on the West Riding County Council in relation to lands and finances of the administrative county of the West Riding of Yorkshire; and for other purposes. (Repealed by Statute Law (Repeals) Act 1989 (c. 43))
Hambros Bank Act 1970	1970 c. xxvi	29 May 1970
An Act to provide for the transfer to Hambros Limited of the banking business of Hambros Bank, Limited; and for other purposes.
Norwich Corporation Act 1970 (repealed)	1970 c. xxvii	29 May 1970
An Act to confer further powers on the lord mayor, aldermen and citizens of the city of Norwich; to empower them to establish an undertaking for the supply of heat; to make further provision for the improvement, health, local government and finances of the city; and for other purposes. (Repealed by Norwich City Council Act 1984 (c. xxiii))
Hooker Estates Limited (Transfer of Registration) Act 1970	1970 c. xxviii	29 May 1970
An Act to make provision for the transfer to the State of New South Wales in the Commonwealth of Australia of the registered office of Hooker Estates Limited; for the cesser of application to that company of provisions of the Companies Acts 1948 to 1967; and for other purposes incidental thereto.
Stoke-on-Trent Corporation Act 1970 (repealed)	1970 c. xxix	29 May 1970
An Act to confer further powers on the lord mayor, aldermen and citizens of the city of Stoke-on-Trent in relation to the finances of the city; and for other purposes. (Repealed by Staffordshire Act 1983 (c. xviii))
Southampton Corporation Act 1970	1970 c. xxx	29 May 1970
An Act to confer further powers on the mayor, aldermen and citizens of the city and county of the city of Southampton with regard to finance; to make further provision for the investment of moneys forming part of the superannuation fund maintained by them; and for other purposes.
Aberdeen Extension Order Confirmation Act 1970	1970 c. xxxi	23 July 1970
An Act to confirm a Provisional Order under the Private Legislation Procedure (Scotland) Act 1936, relating to Aberdeen Extension.
	Aberdeen Extension Order 1970 Provisional Order to extend the boundaries of the city and royal burgh of Aberdeen and for other purposes.	
Forth Ports Authority Order Confirmation Act 1970	1970 c. xxxii	23 July 1970
An Act to confirm a Provisional Order under the Private Legislation Procedure (Scotland) Act 1936, relating to the Forth Ports Authority.
	Forth Ports Authority Order 1970 Provisional Order to authorise the Forth Ports Authority to construct additional works; and for other purposes.	
Mallaig Harbour Order Confirmation Act 1970	1970 c. xxxiii	23 July 1970
An Act to confirm a Provisional Order under the Private Legislation Procedure (Scotland) Act 1936, relating to Mallaig Harbour.
	Mallaig Harbour Order 1970 Provisional Order to authorise the Mallaig Harbour Authority to carry out works for the improvement of the harbour of Mallaig and to borrow money; and for other purposes.	
Bank of Scotland Order Confirmation Act 1970	1970 c. xxxiv	23 July 1970
An Act to confirm a Provisional Order under the Private Legislation Procedure (Scotland) Act 1936, relating to the Bank of Scotland.
	Bank of Scotland Order 1970 Provisional Order to provide for the transfer to the Governor and Company of the Bank of Scotland of the business and undertaking of The British Linen Bank and for other purposes.	
Fife County Council Order Confirmation Act 1970 (repealed)	1970 c. xxxv	23 July 1970
An Act to confirm a Provisional Order under the Private Legislation Procedure (Scotland) Act 1936, relating to Fife County Council. (Repealed by Statute Law (Repeals) Act 1995 (c. 44))
	Fife County Council Order 1970 Provisional Order to confer on the County Council of the county of Fife further powers with respect to the finances of the county; to make further provision for the investment of the superannuation fund maintained by the County Council; and for other purposes.	
Midlothian County Council Order Confirmation Act 1970 (repealed)	1970 c. xxxvi	23 July 1970
An Act to confirm a Provisional Order under the Private Legislation Procedure (Scotland) Act 1936, relating to Midlothian County Council. (Repealed by Statute Law (Repeals) Act 1998 (c. 43))
	Midlothian County Council Order 1970 Provisional Order to confer further powers on the county council of the county of Midlothian in relation to the finances of the said county; to make further provision for the investment of moneys forming part of the superannuation fund maintained by the said county council; and for other purposes.	
West Lothian County Council Order Confirmation Act 1970 (repealed)	1970 c. xxxvii	23 July 1970
An Act to confirm a Provisional Order under the Private Legislation Procedure (Scotland) Act 1936, relating to West Lothian County Council. (Repealed by Statute Law (Repeals) Act 1998 (c. 43))
	West Lothian County Council Order 1970 Provisional Order to confer on the county council of the county of West Lothian further powers with respect to the finances of the county; and for other purposes.	
Lake of Menteith Fisheries Order Confirmation Act 1970	1970 c. xxxviii	23 July 1970
An Act to confirm a Provisional Order under the Private Legislation Procedure (Scotland) Act 1936, relating to the Lake of Menteith Fisheries.
	Lake of Menteith Fisheries Order 1970 Provisional Order to confer on the Lake of Menteith Fisheries Limited powers with respect to fishings in the Lake of Menteith; and for other purposes.	
Barclays Bank Trust Company Act 1970	1970 c. xxxix	23 July 1970
An Act to transfer to Barclays Bank Trust Company Limited the executor and trustee business of Barclays Bank Limited; and for other purposes.
Brighton Corporation Act 1970	1970 c. xl	23 July 1970
An Act to authorise the mayor, aldermen and burgesses of the county borough of Brighton to construct street works and other works and to acquire lands for those purposes; and for other purposes.
North Riding County Council Act 1970	1970 c. xli	23 July 1970
An Act to confer further powers on the county council of the North Riding of the county of York in relation to the finances of the county; and for other purposes.
Blackburn Corporation Act 1970 (repealed)	1970 c. xlii	23 July 1970
An Act to confer further powers on the mayor, aldermen and burgesses of the county borough of Blackburn in relation to the finances of the borough; and for other purposes. (Repealed by County of Lancashire Act 1984 (c. xxi))
Kent County Council Act 1970 (repealed)	1970 c. xliii	23 July 1970
An Act to confer further powers on the Kent County Council in relation to lands and the local government and finances of the county; and for other purposes. (Repealed by County of Kent Act 1981 (c. xviii))
Williams & Glyn's Bank Act 1970	1970 c. xliv	23 July 1970
An Act to provide for the transfer to Williams & Glyn's Bank Limited of the undertakings of Glyn, Mills & Co., The National Bank Limited and Williams Deacon's Bank Limited; and for other purposes incidental thereto and consequential thereupon.
Cumberland County Council Act 1970	1970 c. xlv	23 July 1970
An Act to confer further powers on the Cumberland County Council and on local authorities in the administrative county of Cumberland in relation to lands, development and the local government, improvement and finances of the county; and for other purposes.
Gloucestershire County Council Act 1970	1970 c. xlvi	23 July 1970
An Act to confer further powers on the Gloucestershire County Council in relation to the finances of the county; and for other purposes.
Salop County Council Act 1970	1970 c. xlvii	23 July 1970
An Act to confer further powers on the Salop County Council with regard to finance and local government; and for other purposes.
West Sussex County Council Act 1970	1970 c. xlviii	23 July 1970
An Act to confer further powers on the West Sussex County Council in relation to the finances of the county; and for other purposes.
Staffordshire County Council Act 1970	1970 c. xlix	23 July 1970
An Act to confer further powers on the Staffordshire County Council in relation to the finances of the county; to confer further powers on the county council and on local authorities and other public authorities with regard to the superannuation of employees and to the investment of superannuation funds; and for other purposes.
Northumberland County Council Act 1970	1970 c. l	23 July 1970
An Act to confer further powers on the Northumberland County Council in relation to industry, lands and highways and the local government, improvement, health and finances of the county; and for other purposes.
Manchester Corporation Act 1970	1970 c. li	23 July 1970
An Act to confer further powers upon the lord mayor, aldermen and citizens of the city of Manchester and to make further provision with regard to the local government, lands and finances of the city and with regard to pensions; and for other purposes.
Whitehaven Harbour Act 1970	1970 c. lii	23 July 1970
An Act to authorise the Whitehaven Harbour Commissioners to construct further works; and for other purposes.
Tor Bay Harbour Act 1970	1970 c. liii	23 July 1970
An Act to re-enact with amendments certain enactments relating to the Brixham, Paignton and Torquay harbours; to extend the limits of the harbours and to provide for one harbour for Tor Bay; to confer further powers for the administration, management and control of the harbour upon the mayor, aldermen and burgesses of the county borough of Torbay; and for other purposes.
West Hertfordshire Main Drainage Act 1970	1970 c. liv	23 July 1970
An Act to confer further powers upon the West Hertfordshire Main Drainage Authority; to extend the sewerage district of that Authority; and for other purposes.
Greater London Council (Money) Act 1970	1970 c. lv	23 July 1970
An Act to regulate the expenditure on capital account and on lending to other persons by the Greater London Council during the financial period from 1st April 1970 to 30th September 1971; and for other purposes.
Aberdeen Corporation Order Confirmation Act 1970 (repealed)	1970 c. lvi	17 December 1970
An Act to confirm a Provisional Order under the Private Legislation Procedure (Scotland) Act 1936, relating to Aberdeen Corporation. (Repealed by Statute Law (Repeals) Act 1998 (c. 43))
	Aberdeen Corporation Order 1970 Provisional Order to confer further powers on the Corporation of the city of Aberdeen in relation to the finances of the said city; and for other purposes.	
Glasgow Corporation (Works &c.) Order Confirmation Act 1970	1970 c. lvii	17 December 1970
An Act to confirm a Provisional Order under the Private Legislation Procedure (Scotland) Act 1936, relating to Glasgow Corporation (Works &c.).
	Glasgow Corporation (Works &c.) Order 1970 Provisional Order to authorise the Corporation of the city of Glasgow to acquire lands and to construct works; to confer powers on the Corporation to require fire precautions in certain buildings used as places of public assembly; and for other purposes.	
Stirling County Council Order Confirmation Act 1970 (repealed)	1970 c. lviii	17 December 1970
An Act to confirm a Provisional Order under the Private Legislation Procedure (Scotland) Act 1936, relating to Stirling County Council. (Repealed by Statute Law (Repeals) Act 1995 (c. 44))
	Stirling County Council Order 1970 Provisional Order to confer on the County Council of the county of Stirling further powers with respect to the finances of the county; to make further provision for the investment of the superannuation fund maintained by the County Council; and for other purposes.	
Dundee Corporation Order Confirmation Act 1970 (repealed)	1970 c. lix	17 December 1970
An Act to confirm a Provisional Order under the Private Legislation Procedure (Scotland) Act 1936, relating to Dundee Corporation. (Repealed by Statute Law (Repeals) Act 1998 (c. 43))
	Dundee Corporation Order 1970 Provisional Order to confer further powers on the Corporation of the city and royal burgh of Dundee in relation to the finances of the said city; to make further provision for the borrowing of moneys; to make further provision for the investment of moneys forming part of the superannuation fund maintained by the said Corporation; and for other purposes.	
Edinburgh Corporation Order Confirmation Act 1970	1970 c. lx	17 December 1970
An Act to confirm a Provisional Order under the Private Legislation Procedure (Scotland) Act 1936, relating to Edinburgh Corporation.
	Edinburgh Corporation Order 1970 Provisional Order to authorise the Corporation of the city of Edinburgh to acquire lands; to construct a new sewer within the city; to abstract water from the Water of Leith in connection with refuse disposal within the city; to borrow money for the purposes of the Order; and for other purposes.	
Nottinghamshire County Council Act 1970 (repealed)	1970 c. lxi	17 December 1970
An Act to confer further powers on the Nottinghamshire County Council in relation to the finances of the county; and for other purposes. (Repealed by Nottinghamshire County Council Act 1985 (c. xv))
Preston Corporation Act 1970 (repealed)	1970 c. lxii	17 December 1970
An Act to confer further powers upon the mayor, aldermen and burgesses of the borough of Preston with regard to the finances of the borough; and for other purposes. (Repealed by County of Lancashire Act 1984 (c. xxi))
Lindsey County Council Act 1970 (repealed)	1970 c. lxiii	17 December 1970
An Act to confer further powers on the county council of Lincoln, Parts of Lindsey, in relation to the finances of the county; and for other purposes. (Repealed by Humberside Act 1982 (c. iii))
Northampton Corporation Act 1970 (repealed)	1970 c. lxiv	17 December 1970
An Act to confer further powers on the mayor, aldermen and burgesses of the county borough of Northampton; to establish and undertaking for the supply of heat; to make further provision for the finances, improvement and local government of the borough; and for other purposes. (Repealed by Northampton Act 1988 (c. xxix))
Pembrokeshire Water Board Act 1970	1970 c. lxv	17 December 1970
An Act to confer further powers on the Pembrokeshire Water Board in relation to the finances of the Board; and for other purposes.
Port of Tyne Act 1970	1970 c. lxvi	17 December 1970
An Act to empower the Port of Tyne Authority to transfer the Market Place Ferry undertaking at North Shields and South Shields; to make certain provision for enabling the service of that undertaking to be reduced or abandoned; and for other purposes.
Barry Corporation Act 1970	1970 c. lxvii	17 December 1970
An Act to confer further powers on the mayor, aldermen and burgesses of the borough of Barry; to make better provision with respect to the improvement, local government and finances of the borough; and for other purposes.
Gateshead Corporation Act 1970 (repealed)	1970 c. lxviii	17 December 1970
An Act to confer further powers on the mayor, aldermen and burgesses of the county borough of Gateshead in relation to the finances of the county borough; and for other purposes. (Repealed by Tyne and Wear Act 1980 (c. xliii))
City of London (Various Powers) Act 1970	1970 c. lxix	17 December 1970
An Act to make further provision with respect to superannuation, administration and the borrowing of money by the Corporation of London; and for other purposes.
Gloucester Corporation Act 1970	1970 c. lxx	17 December 1970
An Act to confer further powers on the mayor, aldermen and citizens of the city of Gloucester in relation to the finances of the city; and for other purposes.
West End Baptist Church, Hammersmith Act 1970	1970 c. lxxi	17 December 1970
An Act to authorise the sale of the burial ground attached to or comprised in the West End Baptist Church, Hammersmith and premises appurtenant thereto; to authorise the use of the said burial ground for building or otherwise; and for purposes incidental thereto.
East Suffolk County Council Act 1970	1970 c. lxxii	17 December 1970
An Act to confer further powers on the East Suffolk County Council in relation to lands and the local government, improvement and finances of the administrative county of East Suffolk; to make further provision for the superannuation of employees; and for other purposes.
Liverpool Corporation Act 1970 (repealed)	1970 c. lxxiii	17 December 1970
An Act to confer further powers on the lord mayor, aldermen and citizens of the city of Liverpool in relation to the finances of the city; and for other purposes. (Repealed by County of Merseyside Act 1980 (c. x))
Southend-on-Sea Corporation Act 1970 (repealed)	1970 c. lxxiv	17 December 1970
An Act to confer further powers upon the mayor, aldermen and burgesses of the county borough of Southend-on-Sea; to make further provision with regard to highways and finance; and for other purposes. (Repealed by Essex Act 1987 (c. xx))
British Railways Act 1970	1970 c. lxxv	17 December 1970
An Act to empower the British Railways Board to construct a work; to extend the time for the compulsory purchase of certain lands and the completion of a certain work; to confer further powers on the Board; and for other purposes.
Greater London Council (General Powers) Act 1970	1970 c. lxxvi	17 December 1970
An Act to confer further powers upon the Greater London Council and other authorities; and for other purposes.
Monmouthshire County Council Act 1970	1970 c. lxxvii	17 December 1970
An Act to confer further powers on the Monmouthshire County Council and on local, highway and other authorities in the administrative county of Monmouth in relation to lands, amenities, highways and the local government, improvement, health and finances of the county and of the boroughs and districts therein; and for other purposes.
Port of London Act 1970	1970 c. lxxviii	17 December 1970
An Act to make further provision in relation to the discontinuance of operation by the Port of London Authority of certain works; and for other purposes.
Western Valleys (Monmouthshire) Sewerage Board Act 1970	1970 c. lxxix	17 December 1970
An Act to confer further powers upon the Western Valleys (Monmouthshire) Sewerage Board; to amend certain local enactments relating to the Board's undertaking; and for other purposes.
Bootle Corporation Act 1970 (repealed)	1970 c. lxxx	17 December 1970
An Act to confer further powers upon the mayor, aldermen and burgesses of the borough of Bootle; to empower them to establish an undertaking for the supply of heat; to make further provision for the improvement, health, local government and finances of the borough; and for other purposes. (Repealed by County of Merseyside Act 1982 (c. x))
Bridge Street Baptist Church, Banbury Act 1970	1970 c. lxxxi	17 December 1970
An Act to authorise the sale of the Baptist Church at Bridge Street in the borough of Banbury and of the burial ground, land and premises appurtenant thereto; to authorise the demolition of the said church and other premises and the use for other purposes of the site thereof and the said burial ground and land; and for purposes incidental thereto.
Grimsby Corporation Act 1970 (repealed)	1970 c. lxxxii	17 December 1970
An Act to empower the mayor, aldermen and burgesses of the county borough of Grimsby to make provision with regard to the use for recreational purposes of parts of Grimsby Haven, West Haven and the river Freshney, and to make further provision with regard to streets and the local government, health, improvement and finances of the borough; to make further provision for the superannuation of employees; and for other purposes. (Repealed by Humberside Act 1982 (c. iii))
Oxfordshire County Council Act 1970 (repealed)	1970 c. lxxxiii	17 December 1970
An Act to confer further powers on the Oxfordshire County Council in relation to lands and highways and the local government, improvement and finance of the county; to make further provision for the superannuation of employees of the Council and local authorities in the county; and for other purposes. (Repealed by Oxfordshire Act 1985 (c. xxxiv))
Reading Corporation Act 1970 (repealed)	1970 c. lxxxiv	17 December 1970
An Act to confer further powers upon the mayor, aldermen and burgesses of the county borough of Reading; to make further provision with regard to the health, local government, welfare, improvement and finances of the borough; and for other purposes. (Repealed by Berkshire Act 1986 (c. ii))
Wiltshire County Council Act 1970	1970 c. lxxxv	17 December 1970
An Act to confer further powers on the Wiltshire County Council and local authorities in the administrative county of Wilts in relation to lands and highways and the local government, improvement and finances of the county; to make further provision for the superannuation of employees; and for other purposes.

== See also ==
- List of acts of the Parliament of the United Kingdom

== Sources ==
- The Journals of the House of Commons (PDF). Vol. 225 (October 1969 – May 1970). pp. 3–366 – via parliament.uk.
- The Journals of the House of Commons (PDF). Vol. 226 (June 1970 – October 1971). pp. 3–622 – via parliament.uk.
- Chronological Table of the Statutes: Covering the Period from 1235 to the End of 1971. London: Her Majesty's Stationery Office. 1972. pp. 1301–1311. ISBN 978-0-11-840096-1 – via Google Books.
- "UK Public General Acts from 1970". legislation.gov.uk. The National Archives.
- "UK Local Acts from 1970". legislation.gov.uk. The National Archives.
