= List of acts of the Parliament of the United Kingdom from 1949 =

This is a complete list of acts of the Parliament of the United Kingdom for the year 1949.

Note that the first parliament of the United Kingdom was held in 1801; parliaments between 1707 and 1800 were either parliaments of Great Britain or of Ireland. For acts passed up until 1707, see the list of acts of the Parliament of England and the list of acts of the Parliament of Scotland. For acts passed from 1707 to 1800, see the list of acts of the Parliament of Great Britain. See also the list of acts of the Parliament of Ireland.

For acts of the devolved parliaments and assemblies in the United Kingdom, see the list of acts of the Scottish Parliament, the list of acts of the Northern Ireland Assembly, and the list of acts and measures of Senedd Cymru; see also the list of acts of the Parliament of Northern Ireland.

The number shown after each act's title is its chapter number. Acts passed before 1963 are cited using this number, preceded by the year(s) of the reign during which the relevant parliamentary session was held; thus the Union with Ireland Act 1800 is cited as "39 & 40 Geo. 3. c. 67", meaning the 67th act passed during the session that started in the 39th year of the reign of George III and which finished in the 40th year of that reign. Note that the modern convention is to use Arabic numerals in citations (thus "41 Geo. 3" rather than "41 Geo. III"). Acts of the last session of the Parliament of Great Britain and the first session of the Parliament of the United Kingdom are both cited as "41 Geo. 3". Acts passed from 1963 onwards are simply cited by calendar year and chapter number.

== 12, 13 & 14 Geo. 6 ==
Continuing the fifth session of the 38th Parliament of the United Kingdom, which met from 26 October 1948 until 16 December 1949.

This session was also traditionally cited as 12, 13 & 14 G. 6.

=== Public general acts ===
Short title	Citation	Royal assent
Long title
Railway and Canal Commission (Abolition) Act 1949	12, 13 & 14 Geo. 6. c. 11	9 March 1949
An Act to abolish the Railway and Canal Commission and make provision for the future exercise and performance of their functions; to amend and repeal certain enactments relating to their functions; and for purposes connected with the matters aforesaid.
Pensions Appeal Tribunals Act 1949	12, 13 & 14 Geo. 6. c. 12	9 March 1949
An Act to amend the Pensions Appeal Tribunals Act, 1943. (Note: Pensions Appeal Tribunals Act 1943 (6 & 7 Geo. 6. c. 39))
Savings Banks Act 1949	12, 13 & 14 Geo. 6. c. 13	9 March 1949
An Act to amend the law relating to trustee savings banks, to abolish naval savings banks, to extend the powers of the Postmaster General under section two of the Savings Banks Act, 1904; (Note: Savings Banks Act 1904 (4 Edw. 7. c. 8)) and for purposes connected with the matters aforesaid.
Export Guarantees Act 1949 (repealed)	12, 13 & 14 Geo. 6. c. 14	9 March 1949
An Act to make further provision with respect to the powers of the Board of Trade to give guarantees in connection with overseas transactions; and for purposes connected with the matters aforesaid. (Repealed by Export Guarantees Act 1968 (c. 26))
Minister of Food (Financial Powers) Act 1949	12, 13 & 14 Geo. 6. c. 15	9 March 1949
An Act to authorise the payment out of moneys provided by Parliament of sums required by the Minister of Food to fulfil contracts or arrangements entered into by him, whether before or after the passing of this Act, including contracts or arrangements involving commitments extending beyond the financial year current when the contracts or arrangements were made.
National Theatre Act 1949	12, 13 & 14 Geo. 6. c. 16	9 March 1949
An Act to authorise the Treasury to contribute towards the cost of a national theatre, and for purposes connected therewith.
American Aid and European Payments (Financial Provisions) Act 1949 (repealed)	12, 13 & 14 Geo. 6. c. 17	9 March 1949
An Act to make certain provision of a financial nature in connection with the assistance furnished to the United Kingdom in pursuance of the Act of the Congress of the United States of America known as the Economic Cooperation Act of 1948, (Note: The Marshall Plan.) or any other Act of the Congress of the United States of America for amending or supplementing that Act or for making appropriations thereunder, and any assistance furnished by or to the United Kingdom in pursuance of agreements entered into by members of the Organisation for European Economic Co-operation. (Repealed by Statute Law Revision Act 1960 (8 & 9 Eliz. 2. c. 56))
Colonial Naval Defence Act 1949 (repealed)	12, 13 & 14 Geo. 6. c. 18	9 March 1949
An Act to make further provision for the naval defence of overseas territories. (Repealed by Armed Forces Act 2006 (c. 52))
Education (Scotland) Act 1949 (repealed)	12, 13 & 14 Geo. 6. c. 19	9 March 1949
An Act to amend the provisions of the Education (Scotland) Act, 1946, (Note: Education (Scotland) Act 1946 (9 & 10 Geo. 6. c. 72)) relating to attendance at junior colleges, to the powers of education authorities to provide education for pupils belonging to the areas of other authorities and to enable persons to take advantage of educational facilities and to other matters; and to amend the provisions of other Acts relating to defective children and the employment of children. (Repealed by Education (Scotland) Act 1962 (10 & 11 Eliz. 2. c. 47))
Cinematograph Film Production (Special Loans) Act 1949 (repealed)	12, 13 & 14 Geo. 6. c. 20	9 March 1949
An Act to make temporary provision for the lending of money to be employed in financing the production or distribution of cinematograph films; to provide for the taking over by a national corporation established for the purpose aforesaid of the assets and liabilities of National Film Finance Company Limited; and for purposes connected with the matters aforesaid. (Repealed by National Film Finance Corporation Act 1981 (c. 15))
Solicitors, Public Notaries, &c. Act 1949 (repealed)	12, 13 & 14 Geo. 6. c. 21	23 March 1949
An Act to repeal the enactments requiring certain legal practitioners in Great Britain to take out stamped practising certificates, and to make consequential provision as to their right to practise and other matters. (Repealed by Solicitors Act 1974 (c. 47))
British North America Act 1949 known in Canada as the Newfoundland Act	12, 13 & 14 Geo. 6. c. 22	23 March 1949
An Act to confirm and give effect to Terms of Union agreed between Canada and Newfoundland.
Social Services (Northern Ireland Agreement) Act 1949 (repealed)	12, 13 & 14 Geo. 6. c. 23	23 March 1949
An Act to confirm and give effect to an agreement made between the Treasury and the Ministry of Finance for Northern Ireland with a view to assimilating the burdens on the Exchequer of the United Kingdom and the Exchequer of Northern Ireland in respect of certain social and allied services. (Repealed by Finance Act 1971 (c. 68))
Consolidated Fund (No. 1) Act 1949 (repealed)	12, 13 & 14 Geo. 6. c. 24	29 March 1949
An Act to apply certain sums out of the Consolidated Fund to the service of the years ending on the thirty-first day of March, one thousand nine hundred and forty-eight, one thousand nine hundred and forty-nine and one thousand nine hundred and fifty. (Repealed by Statute Law Revision Act 1964 (c. 79))
Tenancy of Shops (Scotland) Act 1949	12, 13 & 14 Geo. 6. c. 25	29 March 1949
An Act to make provision with regard to tenancies of shops in Scotland.
Public Works (Festival of Britain) Act 1949 (repealed)	12, 13 & 14 Geo. 6. c. 26	29 March 1949
An Act to provide, in connection with the Festival of Britain, 1951, for conferring further powers on the British Transport Commission and the London County Council, for the making by the Minister of Transport of grants in respect of expenses incurred by or on behalf of those bodies, for suspending or restricting the use by the public of certain streets and for other matters. (Repealed by Statute Law (Repeals) Act 1986 (c. 12))
Juries Act 1949	12, 13 & 14 Geo. 6. c. 27	26 April 1949
An Act to provide for the making of payments in respect of jury service in Great Britain, to abolish special juries in Great Britain except in commercial causes tried in London; to abolish the privilege of landed persons in relation to jury trial in Scotland; to empower the Parliament of Northern Ireland to make laws providing for the payment of jurors in His Majesty's High Court of Justice in Northern Ireland and the abolition of special juries in that Court; and for purposes connected with the matters aforesaid. (Repealed for England and Wales and Northern Ireland by Statute Law (Repeals) Act 1978 (c. 45))
Army and Air Force (Annual) Act 1949 (repealed)	12, 13 & 14 Geo. 6. c. 28	26 April 1949
An Act to provide, during twelve months, for the discipline and regulation of the Army and the Air Force. (Repealed by Statute Law Revision Act 1953 (2 & 3 Eliz. 2. c. 5) and Revision of the Army and Air Force Acts (Transitional Provisions) Act 1955 (3 & 4 Eliz. 2. c. 20))
Consular Conventions Act 1949	12, 13 & 14 Geo. 6. c. 29	26 April 1949
An Act to confer upon the consular officers of foreign States with which consular conventions are concluded by His Majesty certain powers relating to the administration of the estates and property of deceased persons; to restrict the powers of constables and other persons to enter the consular offices of such States; and to amend sections one hundred and seventy-six and five hundred and twenty-one of the Merchant Shipping Act, 1894. (Note: Merchant Shipping Act 1894 (57 & 58 Vict. c. 60))
Agricultural Wages (Scotland) Act 1949	12, 13 & 14 Geo. 6. c. 30	26 April 1949
An Act to consolidate the Agricultural Wages (Regulation) (Scotland) Acts, 1937 to 1947, and so much of the Holidays with Pay Act, 1938, (Note: Holidays with Pay Act 1938 (1 & 2 Geo. 6. c. 70)) as enables a wage regulating authority to make provision for holidays and holiday remuneration for workers in Agriculture in Scotland.
Water (Scotland) Act 1949 (repealed)	12, 13 & 14 Geo. 6. c. 31	11 May 1949
An Act to amend the law with respect to rating and charging for water supplies in Scotland; to amend Part V of the Local Government Act, 1948, (Note: Local Government Act 1948 (11 & 12 Geo. 6. c. 26)) with respect to the ascertainment of the standard amounts thereunder in Scotland; to increase the financial assistance that may be given to local authorities in Scotland under the Rural Water Supplies and Sewerage Act, 1944; (Note: Rural Water Supplies and Sewerage Act 1944 (7 & 8 Geo. 6. c. 26)) to amend the Water (Scotland) Act, 1946; (Note: Water (Scotland) Act 1946 (9 & 10 Geo. 6. c. 42)) and for purposes connected with the matters aforesaid. (Repealed by Water (Scotland) Act 1980 (c. 45))
Special Roads Act 1949 (repealed)	12, 13 & 14 Geo. 6. c. 32	11 May 1949
An Act to provide for the construction of roads reserved for special classes of traffic; to amend the law relating to trunk roads; and for purposes connected with the matters aforesaid. (Repealed by Statute Law (Repeals) Act 1989 (c. 43))
Consolidation of Enactments (Procedure) Act 1949	12, 13 & 14 Geo. 6. c. 33	31 May 1949
An Act to facilitate the preparation of Bills for the purpose of consolidating the enactments relating to any subject.
Milk (Special Designations) Act 1949 (repealed)	12, 13 & 14 Geo. 6. c. 34	31 May 1949
An Act to render compulsory the use of special designations on sales of milk by retail in specified areas, to enact certain provisions ancillary thereto as to the use of such designations, and to amend certain enactments in relation to such designations. (Repealed for England and Wales by Food and Drugs (Milk, Dairies and Artificial Cream) Act 1950 (14 Geo. 6. c. 35) and for Scotland by Food Safety Act 1990 (c. 16))
British Film Institute Act 1949	12, 13 & 14 Geo. 6. c. 35	31 May 1949
An Act to provide for the payment to the British Film Institute of grants out of moneys provided by Parliament.
War Damage (Public Utility Undertakings, &c.) Act 1949 (repealed)	12, 13 & 14 Geo. 6. c. 36	31 May 1949
An Act to repeal section seventy of the War Damage Act, 1943, (Note: War Damage Act 1943 (6 & 7 Geo. 6. c. 21)) to make provision with respect to war damage to immovable property, goods and commodities which belonged to certain undertakings or in which both such undertakings and others had interests and to war damage causing obstruction in waterways, to amend provisions of the said Act as respects such undertakings and otherwise in certain respects, and for purposes connected with the matters aforesaid. (Repealed by Statute Law (Repeals) Act 1981 (c. 19))
Agriculture (Miscellaneous Provisions) Act 1949	12, 13 & 14 Geo. 6. c. 37	31 May 1949
An Act to amend the law relating to agriculture, including certain enactments relating to milk and dairies.
Agricultural Marketing Act 1949 (repealed)	12, 13 & 14 Geo. 6. c. 38	31 May 1949
An Act to amend the Agricultural Marketing Acts, 1931 to 1933, and for purposes connected therewith. (Repealed by Agricultural Marketing Act 1958 (6 & 7 Eliz. 2. c. 47))
Commonwealth Telegraphs Act 1949	12, 13 & 14 Geo. 6. c. 39	31 May 1949
An Act to give effect to certain provisions of an agreement for promoting and co-ordinating the efficiency and development of the external telegraph services of the Commonwealth, and to make provision for certain matters incidental thereto and for extending the system, heretofore embodied in the arrangement made by the Postmaster General with Cable and Wireless, Limited, in pursuance of subsection (4) of section one of the Imperial Telegraphs Act, 1938, (Note: Imperial Telegraphs Act 1938 (1 & 2 Geo. 6. c. 57)) for the sharing of revenue derived from telegrams transmitted to or from places outside the United Kingdom.
Landlord and Tenant (Rent Control) Act 1949 (repealed)	12, 13 & 14 Geo. 6. c. 40	2 June 1949
An Act to provide in certain cases for the determination by a Tribunal of standard rents for the purposes of the Rent and Mortgage Interest Restrictions Acts, 1920 to 1939; further to restrict the requiring of premiums in connection with tenancies to which those Acts apply; to make further provision for the purposes of those Acts where the tenant shares part of his accommodation with his landlord or other persons or sublets part of his dwelling-house furnished; to amend the Rent of Furnished Houses Control (Scotland) Act, 1943, (Note: Rent of Furnished Houses Control (Scotland) Act 1943 (6 & 7 Geo. 6. c. 44)) and the Furnished Houses (Rent Control) Act, 1946, (Note: Furnished Houses (Rent Control) Act 1946 (9 & 10 Geo. 6. c. 34)) as respects security of tenure and the requiring of premiums and as respects the districts for which Tribunals are constituted; to make certain minor amendments of the said Acts in so far as they apply to Scotland; and for purposes connected with the matters aforesaid. (Repealed for England and Wales by Rent Act 1968 (c. 23) and for Scotland by Rent (Scotland) Act 1971 (c. 28))
Ireland Act 1949	12, 13 & 14 Geo. 6. c. 41	2 June 1949
An Act to recognise and declare the constitutional position as to the part of Ireland heretofore known as Eire, and to make provision as to the name by which it may be known and the manner in which the law is to apply in relation to it; to declare and affirm the constitutional position and the territorial integrity of Northern Ireland and to amend, as respects the Parliament of the United Kingdom, the law relating to the qualifications of electors in constituencies in Northern Ireland; and for purposes connected with the matters aforesaid.
Lands Tribunal Act 1949	12, 13 & 14 Geo. 6. c. 42	14 July 1949
An Act to establish new tribunals to determine in place of official arbitrators and others certain questions relating to compensation for the compulsory acquisition of land and other matters, to amend the Acquisition of Land (Assessment of Compensation) Act, 1919, (Note: Acquisition of Land (Assessment of Compensation) Act 1919 (9 & 10 Geo. 5. c. 57)) with respect to the failure to deliver a notice of claim, and for purposes connected therewith.
Merchant Shipping (Safety Convention) Act 1949	12, 13 & 14 Geo. 6. c. 43	14 July 1949
An Act to enable effect to be given to an International Convention for the Safety of Life at Sea, signed in London on the tenth day of June, nineteen hundred and forty-eight; to amend the provisions of the Merchant Shipping Acts, 1894 to 1948, relating to the construction of passenger steamers, to life-saving appliances, wireless and radio navigational aids and to other matters affected by the said Convention, and to amend the provisions of those Acts relating to fees.
Superannuation Act 1949 (repealed)	12, 13 & 14 Geo. 6. c. 44	14 July 1949
An Act to amend the law relating to the superannuation and other benefits payable to and in respect of persons who serve or have served in the civil service of the State or in service to which the Superannuation (Various Services) Act, 1938, (Note: Superannuation (Various Services) Act 1938 (1 & 2 Geo. 6. c. 13)) applies or are existing Irish officers within the meaning of the Government of Ireland Act, 1920; (Note: Government of Ireland Act 1920 (10 & 11 Geo. 5. c. 67)) to authorise the payment of annual allowances and gratuities to and in respect of persons who are injured or contract diseases while employed in a civil capacity for the purposes of His Majesty's Government in the United Kingdom; and for purposes connected with the matters aforesaid. (Repealed by Income Tax Act 1952 (15 & 16 Geo. 6 & 1 Eliz. 2. c. 10), Statute Law Revision Act 1953 (2 & 3 Eliz. 2. c. 5), Superannuation Act 1965 (c. 74), Forestry Act 1967 (c. 10), Pensions (Increase) Act 1971 (c. 56) and Superannuation Act 1972 (c. 11))
U.S.A. Veterans' Pensions (Administration) Act 1949 (repealed)	12, 13 & 14 Geo. 6. c. 45	14 July 1949
An Act to provide for the administration by the Minister of Pensions of veterans' pensions and other sums payable under the law of the United States of America in respect of certain persons; and for purposes connected therewith. (Repealed by Statute Law (Repeals) Act 2004 (c. 14))
House of Commons (Indemnification of Certain Members) Act 1949 (repealed)	12, 13 & 14 Geo. 6. c. 46	14 July 1949
An Act to indemnify John Burns Hynd, Esquire, (Note: John Hynd, Labour MP for Sheffield Attercliffe.) John James Robertson, Esquire, (Note: John Robertson, Labour MP for Berwick and Haddington.) and Albert Evans, Esquire, (Note: Albert Evans, Labour MP for Islington West.) from any penal consequences which they may have incurred under the Succession to the Crown Act, 1707, (Note: Succession to the Crown Act 1707 (6 Ann. c. 41)) the House of Commons (Disqualification) Act, 1782, (Note: House of Commons (Disqualification) Act 1782 (22 Geo. 3. c. 45)) or the House of Commons (Disqualifications) Act, 1801, (Note: House of Commons (Disqualifications) Act 1801 (41 Geo. 3. (U.K.) c. 52)) in respect of certain matters arising before the passing of this Act, and to remove any disqualification for membership of the House of Commons so incurred by them. (Repealed by Representation of the People Act 1969 (c. 15))
Finance Act 1949	12, 13 & 14 Geo. 6. c. 47	30 July 1949
An Act to grant certain duties, to alter other duties, and to amend the law relating to the National Debt and the Public Revenue (other than Purchase Tax), and to make further provision in connection with Finance.
Appropriation Act 1949 (repealed)	12, 13 & 14 Geo. 6. c. 48	30 July 1949
An Act to apply a sum out of the Consolidated Fund to the service of the year ending on the thirty-first day of March, one thousand nine hundred and fifty, and to appropriate the Supplies granted in this Session of Parliament. (Repealed by Statute Law Revision Act 1964 (c. 79))
Colonial Development and Welfare Act 1949 (repealed)	12, 13 & 14 Geo. 6. c. 49	30 July 1949
An Act to increase the amounts payable in any financial year out of moneys provided by Parliament for the purposes of schemes under section one of the Colonial Development and Welfare Act, 1940. (Note: Colonial Development and Welfare Act 1940 (3 & 4 Geo. 6. c. 40)) (Repealed by Colonial Development and Welfare Act 1955 (3 & 4 Eliz. 2. c. 6))
Colonial Loans Act 1949 (repealed)	12, 13 & 14 Geo. 6. c. 50	30 July 1949
An Act to authorise the Treasury to guarantee certain loans by the International Bank for Reconstruction and Development to the Governments of colonial territories. (Repealed by Overseas Development and Co-operation Act 1980 (c. 63))
Legal Aid and Advice Act 1949 (repealed)	12, 13 & 14 Geo. 6. c. 51	30 July 1949
An Act to make legal aid and advice in England and Wales, and in the case of members of the forces legal advice elsewhere, more readily available for persons of small or moderate means, to enable the cost of legal aid or advice for such persons to be defrayed wholly or partly out of moneys provided by Parliament, and for purposes connected therewith. (Repealed by Legal Aid Act 1974 (c. 4))
Slaughter of Animals (Scotland) Act 1949 (repealed)	12, 13 & 14 Geo. 6. c. 52	30 July 1949
An Act to extend the provisions of the Slaughter of Animals (Scotland) Act, 1928, (Note: Slaughter of Animals (Scotland) Act 1928 (18 & 19 Geo. 5. c. 29)) to the slaughter of swine. (Repealed by Agriculture (Miscellaneous Provisions) Act 1972 (c. 62))
Coal Industry Act 1949	12, 13 & 14 Geo. 6. c. 53	30 July 1949
An Act to alter the composition of the National Coal Board, extend the area within which their activities may be carried on, empower them to terminate certain long-term contracts and provide for the enforcement against them of certain workmen's compensation liabilities; to amend sections thirty-seven and sixty-four of the Coal Industry Nationalisation Act, 1946, (Note: Coal Industry Nationalisation Act 1946 (9 & 10 Geo. 6. c. 59)) and authorise the making of certain payments in connection with the settlement of disputes arising under regulations made under the said section thirty-seven and to repeal the provisions of that Act imposing restrictions on the disposal of government stock issued for compensation to companies; to extend the power of the Minister of Fuel and Power to make general regulations under section eighty-six of the Coal Mines Act, 1911, (Note: Coal Mines Act 1911 (1 & 2 Geo. 5. c. 50)) and otherwise to amend that section; and for purposes connected with the matters aforesaid.
Wireless Telegraphy Act 1949 (repealed)	12, 13 & 14 Geo. 6. c. 54	30 July 1949
An Act to amend the law relating to wireless telegraphy. (Repealed by Wireless Telegraphy Act 2006 (c. 36))
Prevention of Damage by Pests Act 1949	12, 13 & 14 Geo. 6. c. 55	30 July 1949
An Act to re-enact with modifications the Rats and Mice (Destruction) Act, 1919; (Note: Rats and Mice (Destruction) Act 1919 (9 & 10 Geo. 5. c. 72)) to make permanent provision for preventing loss of food by infestation; and for purposes connected therewith.
National Insurance Act 1949 (repealed)	12, 13 & 14 Geo. 6. c. 56	30 July 1949
An Act to substitute a new condition for the first of the contribution conditions for death grant set out in paragraph 5 of the Third Schedule to the National Insurance Act, 1946. (Note: National Insurance Act 1946 (9 & 10 Geo. 6. c. 67)) (Repealed by Statute Law Revision (Consequential Repeals) Act 1965 (c. 55))
Airways Corporations Act 1949 (repealed)	12, 13 & 14 Geo. 6. c. 57	30 July 1949
An Act to provide for the merger of the British South American Airways Corporation with the British Overseas Airways Corporation; to authorise the appointment of an additional deputy chairman of the British Overseas Airways Corporation; and for purposes connected with the matters aforesaid. (Repealed by Air Corporations Act 1949 (12, 13 & 14 Geo. 6. c. 91))
Isle of Man (Customs) Act 1949 (repealed)	12, 13 & 14 Geo. 6. c. 58	30 July 1949
An Act to amend the law with respect to customs in the Isle of Man. (Repealed for the Isle of Man by Customs and Excise etc. Order 1976 (GC No 1/76))
Licensing Act 1949 (repealed)	12, 13 & 14 Geo. 6. c. 59	30 July 1949
An Act to extend State management to new towns and to make further provision as respects State management districts; to amend the law relating to licensing justices and confirming and compensation authorities; to provide for the payment of allowances to members of licensing courts and courts of appeal in Scotland; to prohibit in certain cases the supply and consumption of intoxicating liquor outside the permitted hours and to amend the law as to permitted hours, and to make further provision as respects refreshment houses and spirit and wine dealers and as respects the removal of off-licences; to restrict the employment of persons under eighteen in bars; to amend the Licensing Planning (Temporary Provisions) Acts, 1945 (Note: Licensing Planning (Temporary Provisions) Act 1945 (8 & 9 Geo. 6. c. 15)) and 1946, (Note: Licensing Planning (Temporary Provisions) Act 1946 (9 & 10 Geo. 6. c. 53)) and to extend the provisions of the Finance Act, 1946, (Note: Finance Act 1946 (9 & 10 Geo. 6. c. 64)) as to the suspension of justices' licences; to make further provision as to certain notices; to provide for the application of the licensing laws to the Isles of Scilly; and for purposes connected with the matters aforesaid. (Repealed by Statute Law (Repeals) Act 1971 (c. 52))
Housing Act 1949	12, 13 & 14 Geo. 6. c. 60	30 July 1949
An Act to amend the Housing Act, 1936; (Note: Housing Act 1936 (26 Geo. 5 & 1 Edw. 8. c. 51)) to promote the improvement of housing accommodation by authorising the making of contributions out of the Exchequer and of grants by local authorities; to amend the Housing (Financial and Miscellaneous Provisions) Act, 1946, (Note: Housing (Financial and Miscellaneous Provisions) Act 1946 (9 & 10 Geo. 6. c. 48)) with respect to the amounts of contributions payable thereunder out of the Exchequer, and certain other enactments relating to the making of contributions out of the Exchequer in respect of the provision of housing accommodation; to authorise the making out of the Exchequer of contributions in respect of the provision of hostels and of grants in respect of building experiments; to extend and amend other enactments relating to housing and domestic water supply; and for purposes connected with the matters aforesaid.
Housing (Scotland) Act 1949 (repealed)	12, 13 & 14 Geo. 6. c. 61	30 July 1949
An Act to amend the Housing (Scotland) Acts, 1925 to 1946; to promote the improvement of housing accommodation in Scotland by authorising the making of contributions out of the Exchequer and of grants by local authorities; to authorise the making out of the Exchequer of contributions in addition to the contributions payable under the Housing (Financial Provisions) (Scotland) Act, 1946, (Note: Housing (Financial Provisions) (Scotland) Act 1946 (9 & 10 Geo. 6. c. 54)) in certain cases, and of contributions in respect of the provision of hostels and of building experiments in Scotland; to extend and amend certain provisions of the Small Dwellings Acquisition Act, 1899, (Note: Small Dwellings Acquisition Act 1899 (62 & 63 Vict. c. 44)) and the Building Materials and Housing Act, 1945, (Note: Building Materials and Housing Act 1945 (9 & 10 Geo. 6. c. 20)) in their application to Scotland; and for purposes connected with the matters aforesaid. (Repealed by Statute Law (Repeals) Act 1981 (c. 19))
Patents and Designs Act 1949 (repealed)	12, 13 & 14 Geo. 6. c. 62	30 July 1949
An Act to amend the enactments relating to Patents and Designs and to provide for the appointment of an additional puisne judge of the High Court. (Repealed by Patents, Designs and Marks Act 1986 (c. 39))
Legal Aid and Solicitors (Scotland) Act 1949 (repealed)	12, 13 & 14 Geo. 6. c. 63	30 July 1949
An Act to make legal aid and advice in Scotland more readily available for persons of small or moderate means and to enable the cost of legal aid or advice for such persons to be defrayed wholly or partly out of moneys provided by Parliament; to establish a Law Society of Scotland; to amend the law relating to solicitors in Scotland; and for purposes connected with the matters aforesaid. (Repealed by Statute Law (Repeals) Act 1989 (c. 43))
Profits Tax Act 1949 (repealed)	12, 13 & 14 Geo. 6. c. 64	24 November 1949
An Act to increase the profits tax payable on distributed profits and sums treated as such. (Repealed by Finance Act 1958 (6 & 7 Eliz. 2. c. 56))
Overseas Resources Development Act 1949 (repealed)	12, 13 & 14 Geo. 6. c. 65	24 November 1949
An Act to empower the Treasury, under section twelve of the Overseas Resources Development Act, 1948, (Note: Overseas Resources Development Act 1948 (11 & 12 Geo. 6. c. 15)) to guarantee other charges, as well as interest, in respect of loans made to the Corporations established under that Act. (Repealed by Overseas Resources Development Act 1959 (7 & 8 Eliz. 2. c. 23))
House of Commons (Redistribution of Seats) Act 1949 (repealed)	12, 13 & 14 Geo. 6. c. 66	24 November 1949
An Act to consolidate the enactments which make permanent provision for the redistribution of seats at parliamentary elections and the provisions of the Representation of the People Act, 1948, (Note: Representation of the People Act 1948 (11 & 12 Geo. 6. c. 65)) interpreting statutory references to constituencies. (Repealed by Parliamentary Constituencies Act 1986 (c. 56))
Civil Aviation Act 1949 (repealed)	12, 13 & 14 Geo. 6. c. 67	24 November 1949
An Act to consolidate the enactments relating to civil aviation, other than the Carriage by Air Act, 1932, (Note: Carriage by Air Act 1932 (22 & 23 Geo. 5. c. 36)) and other than the enactments relating to the constitution and functions of the Airways Corporations. (Repealed by Civil Aviation Act 1982 (c. 16))
Representation of the People Act 1949 (repealed)	12, 13 & 14 Geo. 6. c. 68	24 November 1949
An Act to consolidate certain enactments relating to parliamentary and local government elections, corrupt and illegal practices and election petitions. (Repealed by Representation of the People Act 1983 (c. 2))
New Forest Act 1949	12, 13 & 14 Geo. 6. c. 69	24 November 1949
An Act to make further provision as respects the New Forest in the county of Southampton.
Docking and Nicking of Horses Act 1949	12, 13 & 14 Geo. 6. c. 70	24 November 1949
An Act to restrict the docking and nicking of horses and the importation of docked horses.
Expiring Laws Continuance Act 1949 (repealed)	12, 13 & 14 Geo. 6. c. 71	24 November 1949
An Act to continue certain expiring laws. (Repealed by Statute Law Revision Act 1953 (2 & 3 Eliz. 2. c. 5))
Iron and Steel Act 1949 (repealed)	12, 13 & 14 Geo. 6. c. 72	24 November 1949
An Act to provide for the establishment of an Iron and Steel Corporation of Great Britain and for defining their functions, and for the transfer to that Corporation of the securities of certain companies engaged in the working, getting and smelting of iron ore, the production of steel, and the shaping of steel by rolling, and of certain property and rights held by a Minister of the Crown or Government department; for the licensing of persons engaged in any such activities; for co-ordinating the activities of the Corporation, the National Coal Board and the Area Gas Boards relating to carbonisation; and for purposes connected with the matters aforesaid. (Repealed by Iron and Steel Act 1969 (c. 45), Gas Act 1972 (c. 60) and Iron and Steel Act 1975 (c. 64))
Nurses Act 1949 (repealed)	12, 13 & 14 Geo. 6. c. 73	24 November 1949
An Act to reconstitute the General Nursing Council for England and Wales and otherwise to amend the Nurses Acts, 1919 to 1945, and to make further provision with respect to the training of nurses for the sick. (Repealed by Nurses Act 1957 (5 & 6 Eliz. 2. c. 15))
Coast Protection Act 1949	12, 13 & 14 Geo. 6. c. 74	24 November 1949
An Act to amend the law relating to the protection of the coast of Great Britain against erosion and encroachment by the sea; to provide for the restriction and removal of works detrimental to navigation; to transfer the management of Crown foreshore from the Minister of Transport to the Commissioners of Crown Lands; and for purposes connected with the matters aforesaid.
Agricultural Holdings (Scotland) Act 1949 (repealed)	12, 13 & 14 Geo. 6. c. 75	24 November 1949
An Act to consolidate the Agricultural Holdings (Scotland) Act, 1923, (Note: Agricultural Holdings (Scotland) Act 1923 (13 & 14 Geo. 5. c. 10)) Part II of the Small Landholders and Agricultural Holdings (Scotland) Act, 1931, (Note: Small Landholders and Agricultural Holdings (Scotland) Act 1931 (21 & 22 Geo. 5. c. 44)) Part I of the Agriculture (Scotland) Act, 1948, (Note: Agriculture (Scotland) Act 1948 (11 & 12 Geo. 6. c. 45)) and certain other enactments relating to agricultural holdings, save, with respect to rights to compensation, in their application to certain cases determined by past events. (Repealed by Agricultural Holdings (Scotland) Act 1991 (c. 55))
Marriage Act 1949	12, 13 & 14 Geo. 6. c. 76	24 November 1949
An Act to consolidate certain enactments relating to the solemnization and registration of marriages in England with such corrections and improvements as may be authorised under the Consolidation of Enactments (Procedure) Act, 1949. (Note: Consolidation of Enactments (Procedure) Act 1949 (12, 13 & 14 Geo. 6. c. 33))
Armed Forces (Housing Loans) Act 1949	12, 13 & 14 Geo. 6. c. 77	16 December 1949
An Act to provide money for the provision of housing accommodation in Great Britain for married persons serving in, or employed in connection with, the armed forces of the Crown, and for purposes connected therewith.
Married Women (Restraint upon Anticipation) Act 1949	12, 13 & 14 Geo. 6. c. 78	16 December 1949
An Act to render inoperative any restriction upon anticipation or alienation attached to the enjoyment of property by a woman.
Coal Industry (No. 2) Act 1949 (repealed)	12, 13 & 14 Geo. 6. c. 79	16 December 1949
An Act to provide for the making to colliery concerns and subsidiaries of such concerns of further income payments for the period between the primary vesting date and the date on which compensation under the Coal Industry Nationalisation Act, 1946, in respect of transfers of transferred interests of the concerns and subsidiaries is satisfied in full, and for purposes connected therewith. (Repealed by Statute Law Revision Act 1966 (c. 5))
Telegraph Act 1949 (repealed)	12, 13 & 14 Geo. 6. c. 80	16 December 1949
An Act to repeal section five of the Post Office and Telegraph Act, 1940, (Note: Post Office and Telegraph Act 1940 (3 & 4 Geo. 6. c. 25)) in so far as it applies to contracts made by local telegraph authorities. (Repealed by Statute Law Revision Act 1953 (2 & 3 Eliz. 2. c. 5))
British North America (No. 2) Act 1949	12, 13 & 14 Geo. 6. c. 81	16 December 1949
An Act to amend the British North America Act, 1867, (Note: British North America Act 1867 (30 & 31 Vict. c. 3)) as respects the amendment of the Constitution of Canada.
Public Works Loans Act 1949 (repealed)	12, 13 & 14 Geo. 6. c. 82	16 December 1949
An Act to grant money for the purpose of certain local loans out of the Local Loans Fund, and for other purposes relating to local loans. (Repealed by Public Works Loans Act 1964 (c. 9))
Local Government Boundary Commission (Dissolution) Act 1949 (repealed)	12, 13 & 14 Geo. 6. c. 83	16 December 1949
An Act to dissolve the Local Government Boundary Commission and repeal the Local Government (Boundary Commission) Act, 1945; (Note: Local Government (Boundary Commission) Act 1945 (8 & 9 Geo. 6. c. 38)) and to make consequential provision as respects certain enactments of the Local Government Act, 1933, (Note: Local Government Act 1933 (23 & 24 Geo. 5. c. 51)) which were amended or repealed by the said Act of 1945. (Repealed by Local Government Act 1958 (6 & 7 Eliz. 2. c. 55))
War Damaged Sites Act 1949 (repealed)	12, 13 & 14 Geo. 6. c. 84	16 December 1949
An Act to enable local authorities to take possession of or do work on certain war damaged land; to authorise the conversion of cost of works payments in certain cases; and for purposes connected with the matters aforesaid. (Repealed by Statute Law (Repeals) Act 1986 (c. 12))
Distribution of German Enemy Property Act 1949	12, 13 & 14 Geo. 6. c. 85	16 December 1949
An Act to provide for the collection and realisation of German enemy property and for the distribution of the proceeds thereof; and for purposes connected with the matters aforesaid.
Electoral Registers Act 1949 (repealed)	12, 13 & 14 Geo. 6. c. 86	16 December 1949
An Act to abolish autumn registers of parliamentary and local government electors, and for purposes connected therewith. (Repealed by Representation of the People Act 1983 (c. 2))
Patents Act 1949	12, 13 & 14 Geo. 6. c. 87	16 December 1949
An Act to consolidate certain enactments relating to patents.
Registered Designs Act 1949	12, 13 & 14 Geo. 6. c. 88	16 December 1949
An Act to consolidate certain enactments relating to registered designs.
Vehicles (Excise) Act 1949 (repealed)	12, 13 & 14 Geo. 6. c. 89	16 December 1949
An Act to consolidate certain enactments relating to excise duties on mechanically propelled vehicles, and to the licensing and registration of such vehicles, with such corrections and improvements as may be authorised under the Consolidation of Enactments (Procedure) Act, 1949. (Repealed by Vehicles (Excise) Act 1962 (10 & 11 Eliz. 2. c. 13))
Election Commissioners Act 1949 (repealed)	12, 13 & 14 Geo. 6. c. 90	16 December 1949
An Act to consolidate certain enactments relating to election commissioners. (Repealed by Representation of the People Act 1969 (c. 15))
Air Corporations Act 1949 (repealed)	12, 13 & 14 Geo. 6. c. 91	16 December 1949
An Act to consolidate the enactments relating to the constitution and functions of the British Overseas Airways Corporation, the British European Airways Corporation and the British South American Airways Corporation. (Repealed for the United Kingdom by Air Corporations Act 1967 (c. 33) and for the Isle of Man by Statute Law (Repeals) Act 1989 (c. 43))
India (Consequential Provision) Act 1949	12, 13 & 14 Geo. 6. c. 92	16 December 1949
An Act to make provision as to the operation of the law in relation to India, and persons and things in any way belonging to or connected with India, in view of India's becoming a Republic while remaining a member of the Commonwealth.
National Health Service (Amendment) Act 1949	12, 13 & 14 Geo. 6. c. 93	16 December 1949
An Act to amend the National Health Service Act, 1946, (Note: National Health Service Act 1946 (9 & 10 Geo. 6. c. 81)) and the National Health Service (Scotland) Act, 1947, (Note: National Health Service (Scotland) Act 1947 (10 & 11 Geo. 6. c. 27)) and otherwise to amend the law in relation to services provided under the said Acts. (Repealed for England and Wales by Health and Social Care (Community Health and Standards) Act 2003 (c. 43))
Criminal Justice (Scotland) Act 1949 (repealed)	12, 13 & 14 Geo. 6. c. 94	16 December 1949
An Act to amend the law of Scotland relating to the probation of offenders, and the powers of courts under the Children and Young Persons (Scotland) Act, 1937; (Note: Children and Young Persons (Scotland) Act 1937 (1 Edw. 8 & 1 Geo. 6. c. 37)) to abolish certain punishments and obsolete sanctions, and otherwise to reform existing methods and provide new methods of dealing with offenders; to alter the law relating to the proceedings of criminal courts in Scotland; to amend the False Oaths (Scotland) Act, 1933; (Note: False Oaths (Scotland) Act 1933 (23 & 24 Geo. 5. c. 20)) to regulate the management of prisons and other institutions in Scotland and the treatment of offenders and other persons committed to custody; to make certain consequential amendments to the Criminal Justice Act, 1948; (Note: Criminal Justice Act 1948 (11 & 12 Geo. 6. c. 58)) and for purposes connected with the aforesaid matters. (Repealed by Criminal Procedure (Consequential Provisions) (Scotland) Act 1995 (c. 40))
Nurses (Scotland) Act 1949 (repealed)	12, 13 & 14 Geo. 6. c. 95	16 December 1949
An Act to reconstitute the General Nursing Council for Scotland and otherwise to amend the Nurses (Scotland) Acts, 1919 to 1945, and to make further provision with respect to the training of nurses for the sick. (Repealed by Nurses (Scotland) Act 1951 (14 & 15 Geo. 6. c. 55))
Auxiliary and Reserve Forces Act 1949 (repealed)	12, 13 & 14 Geo. 6. c. 96	16 December 1949
An Act to amend the law relating to the Territorial Army, the Royal Auxiliary Air Force, the Naval and Marine Reserves, the Army Reserve and the Air Force Reserve; and for purposes connected therewith. (Repealed by Reserve Forces Act 1980 (c. 9))
National Parks and Access to the Countryside Act 1949	12, 13 & 14 Geo. 6. c. 97	16 December 1949
An Act to make provision for National Parks and the establishment of a National Parks Commission; to confer on the Nature Conservancy and local authorities powers for the establishment and maintenance of nature reserves; to make further provision for the recording, creation, maintenance and improvement of public paths and for securing access to open country, and to amend the law relating to rights of way; to confer further powers for preserving and enhancing natural beauty; and for matters connected with the purposes aforesaid.
Adoption of Children Act 1949 (repealed)	12, 13 & 14 Geo. 6. c. 98	16 December 1949
An Act to amend the law relating to the adoption of children; and for related purposes. (Repealed by Statute Law (Repeals) Act 1993 (c. 50))
Married Women (Maintenance) Act 1949 (repealed)	12, 13 & 14 Geo. 6. c. 99	16 December 1949
An Act to amend the Married Women (Maintenance) Acts, 1895 (Note: Summary Jurisdiction (Married Women) Act 1895 (58 & 59 Vict. c. 39)) and 1920; (Note: Married Women (Maintenance) Act 1920 (10 & 11 Geo. 5. c. 63)) and for purposes connected therewith. (Repealed by Matrimonial Proceedings (Magistrates' Courts) Act 1960 (8 & 9 Eliz. 2. c. 48))
Law Reform (Miscellaneous Provisions) Act 1949	12, 13 & 14 Geo. 6. c. 100	16 December 1949
An Act to amend the law relating to divorce and other matrimonial proceedings, the admissibility of evidence as to access, the charge and payment of percentage under the Lunacy Act, 1890, (Note: Lunacy Act 1890 (53 & 54 Vict. c. 5)) and to wards of court; and for purposes connected therewith.
Justices of the Peace Act 1949 (repealed)	12, 13 & 14 Geo. 6. c. 101	16 December 1949
An Act to amend the law relating to justices of the peace (including stipendiary magistrates), justices' clerks and the administrative and financial arrangements for magistrates' courts, to provide for paying travelling and lodging allowances to members of probation committees and case committees and for enabling probation committees to hold land, to authorise the appointment of interim clerks of the peace in Scotland, and for purposes connected therewith. (Repealed for Scotland by District Courts (Scotland) Act 1975 (c. 20) and for England and Wales by Statute Law (Repeals) Act 2013 (c. 2))
Festival of Britain (Supplementary Provisions) Act 1949 (repealed)	12, 13 & 14 Geo. 6. c. 102	16 December 1949
An Act to make, in connection with the Festival of Britain, 1951, provision for festival gardens in Battersea Park and further provision as respects river traffic and as respects buildings, structures, works and entertainments; and for purposes connected therewith. (Repealed by Statute Law (Repeals) Act 1986 (c. 12))
Parliament Act 1949	12, 13 & 14 Geo. 6. c. 103	16 December 1949
An Act to amend the Parliament Act, 1911. (Note: Parliament Act 1911 (1 & 2 Geo. 5. c. 13))

=== Local acts ===
Short title	Citation	Royal assent
Long title
Clydebank Burgh Order Confirmation Act 1949	12, 13 & 14 Geo. 6. c. iv	9 March 1949
An Act to confirm a Provisional Order under the Private Legislation Procedure (Scotland) Act 1936 (Note: Private Legislation Procedure (Scotland) Act 1936 (26 Geo. 5 & 1 Edw. 8. c. 52)) relating to Clydebank Burgh.
	Clydebank Burgh Order 1949 Provisional Order to extend the boundaries of the burgh of Clydebank to make provision with respect to the local government and health of the said burgh and for other purposes.	
Tyne Improvement Act 1949 (repealed)	12, 13 & 14 Geo. 6. c. v	23 March 1949
An Act to make further provision with respect to the superannuation fund established by the Tyne Improvement Commissioners for their officers and servants and for other purposes. (Repealed by Port of Tyne Reorganisation Scheme 1967 Confirmation Order 1968 (SI 1968/942))
Clyde Navigation (Superannuation) Order Confirmation Act 1949 (repealed)	12, 13 & 14 Geo. 6. c. vi	26 April 1949
An Act to confirm a Provisional Order under the Private Legislation Procedure (Scotland) Act 1936 relating to Clyde Navigation (Superannuation). (Repealed by Statute Law (Repeals) Act 1986 (c. 12))
	Clyde Navigation (Superannuation) Order 1949 Provisional Order to amend the provisions of the Clyde Navigation (Superannuation) Order 1908 and the Clyde Navigation Act 1929 (Note: Clyde Navigation Act 1929 (20 & 21 Geo. 5. c. xx)) relative to the superannuation fund for officers and servants of the Trustees of the Clyde Navigation and for other purposes.	
Wandsworth and District Gas Act 1949	12, 13 & 14 Geo. 6. c. vii	26 April 1949
An Act to enable the Wandsworth and District Gas Company to erect buildings on the burial ground of the Old Baptist Chapel in Fairfield Street Wandsworth and for other purposes.
Hurst Park Race Course Act 1949	12, 13 & 14 Geo. 6. c. viii	26 April 1949
An Act to provide to the closing of part of Ferry Road in the urban district of Esher in the county of Surrey during the Hurst Park races and for closing a footpath and for other purposes.
Mid-Northamptonshire Water Board Order Confirmation (Special Procedure) Act 1949	12, 13 & 14 Geo. 6. c. ix	31 May 1949
An Act to confirm in accordance with the Statutory Orders (Special Procedure) Act 1945 an order of the Minister of Health under the Water Act 1945 (Note: Water Act 1945 (8 & 9 Geo. 6. c. 42)) relating to Mid-Northamptonshire.
	Mid-Northamptonshire Water Board Order 1948 (Note: Although passed in 1949, the short title is specified as the Mid-Northamptonshire Water Board Order 1948.) The Mid-Northamptonshire Water Board Order 1948.	
Grimsby Corporation Act 1949	12, 13 & 14 Geo. 6. c. x	31 May 1949
An Act to regulate and define the position of the mayor aldermen and burgesses of the borough of Grimsby in relation to the acquisition of lands held for the benefit of the enrolled freemen of the said borough and subject to the provisions of the Grimsby Pastures Act 1849 (Note: Grimsby Pastures Act 1849 (12 & 13 Vict. c. xvi)) to relieve the said mayor aldermen and burgesses from the duties of trusteeship in relation to such lands to amend the said Act to provide for the discontinuance of the Freemen's Grammar Schools in Grimsby and for other purposes.
University of Nottingham Act 1949	12, 13 & 14 Geo. 6. c. xi	31 May 1949
An Act to dissolve the University College of Nottingham and to transfer all the rights property and liabilities of that college to the University of Nottingham and for other purposes.
Alexander Scott's Hospital Order Confirmation Act 1949	12, 13 & 14 Geo. 6. c. xii	14 July 1949
An Act to confirm a Provisional Order under the Private Legislation Procedure (Scotland) Act 1936 relating to Alexander Scott's Hospital.
	Alexander Scott's Hospital Order 1949 Provisional Order to extend the qualifications for the admission of inmates to Alexander Scott's Hospital and for other purposes.	
Royal Bank of Scotland Officers' Widows' Fund Order Confirmation Act 1949 (repealed)	12, 13 & 14 Geo. 6. c. xiii	14 July 1949
An Act to confirm a Provisional Order under the Private Legislation Procedure (Scotland) Act 1936 relating to Royal Bank of Scotland Officers' Widows' Fund. (Repealed by Statute Law (Repeals) Act 1986 (c. 12))
	Royal Bank of Scotland Officers' Widows' Fund Order 1949 Provisional Order to reconstitute the Royal Bank of Scotland Officers' Widows' Fund to regulate the contributions payable by members and by the bank to make new rules regarding the annuities payable out of the fund and for other purposes.	
City of London (Various Powers) Act 1949	12, 13 & 14 Geo. 6. c. xiv	14 July 1949
An Act to make provision with respect to ward elections in the city of London and for other purposes.
People's Dispensary for Sick Animals Act 1949	12, 13 & 14 Geo. 6. c. xv	14 July 1949
An Act to incorporate and confer powers upon the People's Dispensary for Sick Animals and for other purposes.
Teignmouth and Shaldon Bridge Act 1949	12, 13 & 14 Geo. 6. c. xvi	14 July 1949
An Act to provide for the sale or abandonment of the ferry undertaking of the Teignmouth and Shaldon Bridge Company and for the winding up of the Company and for other purposes.
Harwich Harbour Act 1949	12, 13 & 14 Geo. 6. c. xvii	14 July 1949
An Act to confer further powers upon the Harwich Harbour Conservancy Board and for other purposes.
Royal Alexandra and Albert School Act 1949	12, 13 & 14 Geo. 6. c. xviii	14 July 1949
An Act to amalgamate the Royal Alexandra School and the Royal Albert School to make provision with respect to the property and funds of the said schools to incorporate the governing body of the amalgamated schools and define the objects and powers of the incorporated body and for other purposes.
Glasgow Corporation Order Confirmation Act 1949	12, 13 & 14 Geo. 6. c. xix	30 July 1949
An Act to confirm a Provisional Order under the Private Legislation Procedure (Scotland) Act 1936 relating to Glasgow Corporation.
	Glasgow Corporation Order 1949 Provisional Order to authorise the Corporation of the city of Glasgow to borrow further moneys for the purposes of their sewage undertaking to confer further powers on the said Corporation in connection with their parks and markets undertakings and with respect to the regulation of traffic to provide for the abandonment of the construction of the bridge over the river Clyde at Finnieston authorised by the Glasgow Corporation Order 1927 and to confer powers on the said Corporation with respect to the development of lands acquired by them in connection therewith to confer further powers on the said Corporation with respect to their tramway undertaking and for other purposes.	
Edinburgh and Midlothian Water Order Confirmation Act 1949 (repealed)	12, 13 & 14 Geo. 6. c. xx	30 July 1949
An Act to confirm a Provisional Order under the Private Legislation Procedure (Scotland) Act 1936 relating to Edinburgh and Midlothian Water. (Repealed by Edinburgh Corporation Order Confirmation Act 1962 (c. ii))
	Edinburgh and Midlothian Water Order 1949 Provisional Order to extend the limits for the supply of water by the Corporation of the city of Edinburgh to transfer to and vest in the said Corporation the water undertakings of the county council of the county of Midlothian of the town councils of the burghs of Bonnyrigg and Lasswade Dalkeith Loanhead and Penicuik and of the Musselburgh and Dalkeith Water Trustees to provide for the setting up by the said Corporation of a water committee to manage the water undertaking of the said Corporation on their behalf and for the inclusion in the said committee of representatives of the said county council and of the town councils of the burghs in the said county to enact provisions with respect to the levying of water rates and charges and the supply of water to make provision for the finances of the water undertaking of the said Corporation and for other purposes.	
Teesside Railless Traction Board (Additional Routes) Order Confirmation Act 1949 (repealed)	12, 13 & 14 Geo. 6. c. xxi	30 July 1949
An Act to confirm a Provisional Order made by the Minister of Transport under the North Ormesby South Bank Normanby and Grangetown Railless Traction Act 1912 (Note: North Ormesby, South Bank, Normanby and Grangetown Railless Traction Act 1912 (2 & 3 Geo. 5. c. lv)) relating to Teesside Railless Traction Board trolley vehicles. (Repealed by Teesside Corporation Act 1971 (c. xvii))
	Teesside Railless Traction Board (Additional Routes) Order 1949 Order authorising the Teesside Railless Traction Board to use trolley vehicles upon additional routes in the urban district of Eston in the north riding of the county of York.	
Pier and Harbour Order (Crarae) Confirmation Act 1949	12, 13 & 14 Geo. 6. c. xxii	30 July 1949
An Act to confirm a Provisional Order made by the Minister of Transport under the General Pier and Harbour Act 1861 (Note: General Pier and Harbour Act 1861 (24 & 25 Vict. c. 45)) relating to Crarea.
	Crarae Pier Order 1949 Provisional Order authorising the abandonment of Crarae Pier in the parish of Kilmichael Glassary in the county of Argyll and for other purposes.	
Pier and Harbour Order (Southwold) Confirmation Act 1949	12, 13 & 14 Geo. 6. c. xxiii	30 July 1949
An Act to confirm a Provisional Order made by the Minister of Transport under the General Pier and Harbour Act 1861 relating to Southwold.
	Southwold Pier Order 1949 Provisional Order to provide for the maintenance and regulation of Southwold Pier in the county of East Suffolk to authorise the levying of certain rates and dues in respect thereof and for other purposes.	
Provisional Order (Marriages) Confirmation Act 1949 (repealed)	12, 13 & 14 Geo. 6. c. xxiv	30 July 1949
An Act to confirm certain Provisional Orders made by one of His Majesty's Principal Secretaries of State under the Marriages Validity (Provisional Orders) Acts 1905 (Note: Provisional Order (Marriages) Act 1905 (5 Edw. 7. c. 23)) and 1924. (Note: Marriages Validity (Provisional Orders) Act 1924 (14 & 15 Geo. 5. c. 20)) (Repealed by Statute Law (Repeals) Act 1977 (c. 18))
	New Synagogue Hackney Order.	
	"Roseville" Vine Street Salford Order.	
Ministry of Health Provisional Order Confirmation (South Molton) Act 1949	12, 13 & 14 Geo. 6. c. xxv	30 July 1949
An Act to confirm a Provisional Order of the Minister of Health relating to the borough of South Molton.
	South Molton Order 1949 Provisional Order altering and partially repealing a local Act. (Note: South Molton Markets and Improvement Act 1862 (25 & 26 Vict. c. xxvii))	
Ministry of Health Provisional Order Confirmation (Chichester) Act 1949	12, 13 & 14 Geo. 6. c. xxvi	30 July 1949
An Act to confirm a Provisional Order of the Minister of Health relating to the city of Chichester.
	Chichester Order 1949 Provisional Order altering and partially repealing local Acts. (Note: Chichester Improvements and Markets Act 1807 (47 Geo. 3 Sess. 2. c. lxxxiv)) (Note: Chichester Cattle Market Act 1868 (31 & 32 Vict. c. lxvii))	
Ministry of Health Provisional Order Confirmation (Morley) Act 1949	12, 13 & 14 Geo. 6. c. xxvii	30 July 1949
An Act to confirm a Provisional Order of the Minister of Health relating to the borough of Morley.
	Morley Corporation Order 1949 Provisional Order altering a local Act. (Note: Morley Corporation Act 1913 (3 & 4 Geo. 5. c. cxii))	
Ministry of Health Provisional Order Confirmation (Macclesfield) Act 1949	12, 13 & 14 Geo. 6. c. xxviii	30 July 1949
An Act to confirm a Provisional Order of the Minister of Health relating to the borough of Macclesfield.
	Macclesfield Order 1949 Provisional Order altering and partially repealing local Acts. (Note: Macclesfield Borough Waterworks Act 1849 (12 & 13 Vict. c. xxvi)) (Note: Macclesfield Corporation Act 1939 (2 & 3 Geo. 6. c. lxxxvii))	
British Transport Commission Act 1949	12, 13 & 14 Geo. 6. c. xxix	30 July 1949
An Act to empower the British Transport Commission to construct works and to acquire lands to empower the Mersey Docks and Harbour Board to dispose of certain lands to the Commission to make provision as to the rates dues and charges leviable by the Commission at certain of their docks to authorise the closing for navigation of portions of certain inland waterways to amend in certain respects the River Lee Water Act 1855 (Note: River Lee Water Act 1855 (18 & 19 Vict. c. cxcvi)) as amended by subsequent enactments to extend the time for the compulsory purchase of certain lands the completion of certain works and the exercise of certain powers to confer further powers on the Commission and for other purposes.
Royal Holloway College Act 1949 (repealed)	12, 13 & 14 Geo. 6. c. xxx	30 July 1949
An Act to provide for the incorporation of the Royal Holloway College the redefinition of the objects general character powers and methods of government of the College and the reconstitution of its governing body and for other purposes. (Repealed by Royal Holloway and Bedford New College Act 1985 (c. xx))
London County Council (Money) Act 1949 (repealed)	12, 13 & 14 Geo. 6. c. xxxi	30 July 1949
An Act to regulate the expenditure on capital account and lending of money by the London County Council during the financial period from the first day of April one thousand nine hundred and forty-nine to the thirtieth day of September one thousand nine hundred and fifth and for other purposes. (Repealed by London County Council (Loans) Act 1955 (4 & 5 Eliz. 2. c. xxvi))
Mersey Tunnel Act 1949 (repealed)	12, 13 & 14 Geo. 6. c. xxxii	30 July 1949
An Act to confer further powers in connection with the tunnel authorised by the Mersey Tunnel Acts 1925 to 1933 to amend those Acts in certain respects and for other purposes. (Repealed by County of Merseyside Act 1980 (c. x))
Rochdale Canal Act 1949	12, 13 & 14 Geo. 6. c. xxxiii	30 July 1949
An Act to make further provision with respect to the directors of the Rochdale Canal Company and for other purposes.
Dover Harbour Act 1949 (repealed)	12, 13 & 14 Geo. 6. c. xxxiv	30 July 1949
An Act to make further provision with respect to the dues rates rents and charges demandable by the Dover Harbour Board and for other purposes. (Repealed by Dover Harbour Consolidation Act 1954 (2 & 3 Eliz. 2. c. iv))
Falmouth Docks Act 1949 (repealed)	12, 13 & 14 Geo. 6. c. xxxv	30 July 1949
An Act to authorise the Falmouth Docks and Engineering Company to construct a new quay to confer further powers upon the Company and for other purposes. (Repealed by Falmouth Docks Act 1959 (7 & 8 Eliz. 2. c. xl))
Manchester Ship Canal Act 1949	12, 13 & 14 Geo. 6. c. xxxvi	30 July 1949
An Act to empower the Manchester Ship Canal Company to execute works and acquire lands to amend the provisions relating to the superannuation fund established for salaried officers and servants of the Company to empower the Company to borrow additional moneys to confer further powers upon the Company and for other purposes.
Huddersfield Corporation Act 1949	12, 13 & 14 Geo. 6. c. xxxvii	30 July 1949
An Act to authorise the mayor aldermen and burgesses of the borough of Huddersfield to supply heat by means of hot water or steam to make further provision in reference to lands and waterworks and the improvement health local government and finances of the borough and for other purposes.
Slough Corporation Act 1949 (repealed)	12, 13 & 14 Geo. 6. c. xxxviii	30 July 1949
An Act to authorise the mayor, aldermen and burgesses of the borough of Slough to supply heat by means of hot water or steam; to make further provision in reference to lands and the improvement health local government and finances of the borough; and for other purposes. (Repealed by Berkshire Act 1986 (c. ii))
Oldbury Corporation Act 1949 (repealed)	12, 13 & 14 Geo. 6. c. xxxix	30 July 1949
An Act to confer further powers on the Corporation of Oldbury in regard to lands to authorise the supply of heat by means of hot water or steam to make further provision in reference to the health improvement local government and finances of the borough of Oldbury and for other purposes. (Repealed by Warley Corporation Act 1969 (c. liv))
Staffordshire Potteries Water Board Act 1949	12, 13 & 14 Geo. 6. c. xl	30 July 1949
An Act to empower the Staffordshire Potteries Water Board to construct waterworks and acquire lands for the purpose to amend the enactments regulating the use of water impounded by certain compensations reservoirs of the Board to extend the limits for the supply of water by the Board to alter the constitution of the Board and for other purposes.
Crewe Corporation Act 1949	12, 13 & 14 Geo. 6. c. xli	30 July 1949
An Act to extend the time for the compulsory acquisition of certain lands by the mayor aldermen and burgesses of the borough of Crewe to authorise the supply of heat by means of hot water or steam to make further provision for the improvement health local government and finance of the borough and for other purposes.
Rhodesia Railways Limited (Pension Schemes and Contracts) Act 1949	12, 13 & 14 Geo. 6. c. xlii	30 July 1949
An Act to make provision consequent on the intended transfer to the undertaking of the Rhodesia Railways Limited to a body to be constituted by a statute of the legislature of the colony of Southern Rhodesia (Note: Rhodesia Railways Act 1949 (Southern Rhodesia)) with respect to certain pension schemes of the Company and to certain contracts to which the Company are a part or under which they have acquired rights and incurred obligations and for other purposes.
Bolton Corporation Act 1949	12, 13 & 14 Geo. 6. c. xliii	30 July 1949
An Act to confer further powers upon the mayor aldermen and burgesses of the county borough of Bolton and to make further provision with regard to the transport undertaking and the markets undertaking of the Corporation to confer further powers upon them with reference to the acquisition and user of lands to make further provision for the improvement health and good government of the borough to authorise the supply of heat by means of hot water or steam to make further provision with reference to the redemption of gas annuities and the finances of the borough and for other purposes.
Bradford Corporation Act 1949 (repealed)	12, 13 & 14 Geo. 6. c. xliv	30 July 1949
An Act to confer further powers upon the lord mayor aldermen and citizens of the city of Bradford in connection with their transport and market undertakings to authorise the supply of heat by means of hot water or steam to make further provision for the health improvement good government and finances of the city and for other purposes. (Repealed by West Yorkshire Act 1980 (c. xiv))
Southampton Harbour Act 1949	12, 13 & 14 Geo. 6. c. xlv	30 July 1949
An Act to confer further powers on the Southampton Harbour Board and for other purposes.
Dartford Tunnel (Extension of Time) Act 1949 (repealed)	12, 13 & 14 Geo. 6. c. xlvi	30 July 1949
An Act to extend the time for the completion of works and the compulsory acquisition of lands under the Dartford Tunnel Acts 1930 (Note: Dartford Tunnel Act 1930 (20 & 21 Geo. 5. c. clxxxii)) and 1937 (Note: Dartford Tunnel Act 1937 (1 Edw. 8. & 1 Geo. 6. c. cxxvii)) and for other purposes. (Repealed by Dartford Tunnel Act 1967 (c. xxxvii))
Ashdown Forest Act 1949 (repealed)	12, 13 & 14 Geo. 6. c. xlvii	30 July 1949
An Act to provide for the vesting in the Secretary of State for War of certain lands in the county of Sussex forming part of Ashdown Forest and for the acquisition and addition to the forest of other lands in exchange therefor to make provision for the use of the forest for the purposes of military training and for other purposes. (Repealed by Ashdown Forest Act 1974 (c. xxi))
Salford Corporation Act 1949	12, 13 & 14 Geo. 6. c. xlviii	30 July 1949
An Act to amend the provisions of the Salford Corporation Act 1920 (Note: Salford Corporation Act 1920 (10 & 11 Geo. 5. c. cxlviii)) so as to increase the area of Peel Park which may be used for educational purposes and for other purposes.
Halifax Corporation Act 1949	12, 13 & 14 Geo. 6. c. xlix	30 July 1949
An Act to revise the existing obligations of the mayor aldermen and burgesses of the county borough of Halifax with respect to compensation water to make further provision with respect to their water undertaking and with respect to the local government of the said county borough and for other purposes.
Swindon Corporation Act 1949	12, 13 & 14 Geo. 6. c. l	30 July 1949
An Act to confer powers upon the mayor aldermen and burgesses of the borough of Swindon with reference to the supply of hot water and of heat and for other purposes.
Barnsley Corporation Act 1949	12, 13 & 14 Geo. 6. c. li	30 July 1949
An Act to enlarge the powers of the mayor aldermen and burgesses of the county borough of Barnsley in relation to Locke Park to increase the tolls leviable by the Corporation in connection with their markets undertaking and to make further and better provision with respect to the improvement health and local government of the borough and the finances of the Corporation and for other purposes.
West Bromwich Corporation Act 1949 (repealed)	12, 13 & 14 Geo. 6. c. lii	30 July 1949
An Act to authorise the mayor aldermen and burgesses of the county borough of West Bromwich to supply heat by means of hot water or steam to make further provision for the improvement health local government and finances of the borough and for other purposes. (Repealed by West Bromwich Corporation Act 1969 (c. lix) (Note: Incorrectly cited as "West Bromwich Corpn. 1969 (c.li)" in the Chronological Table of Local Acts.))
Urmston Urban District Council Act 1949	12, 13 & 14 Geo. 6. c. liii	30 July 1949
An Act to authorise the Urmston Urban District Council to supply heat by means of hot water and steam to make further and better provision for the improvement health and local government of the urban district of Urmston and for other purposes.
Aberdeen Harbour Order Confirmation Act 1949 (repealed)	12, 13 & 14 Geo. 6. c. liv	24 November 1949
An Act to confirm a Provisional Order under the Private Legislation Procedure (Scotland) Act 1936 relating to Aberdeen Harbour. (Repealed by Statute Law (Repeals) Act 1986 (c. 12))
	Aberdeen Harbour Order 1949 Provisional Order to extend the period of duration of the Aberdeen Harbour Acts 1895 to 1939.	
London County Council (General Powers) Act 1949	12, 13 & 14 Geo. 6. c. lv	24 November 1949
An Act to confer further powers upon the London County Council and other authorities and for other purposes.
Parliament Square (Improvements) Act 1949	12, 13 & 14 Geo. 6. c. lvi	16 December 1949
An Act to authorise certain improvements in and around Parliament Square, and for purposes connected therewith.
Fife County Council Order Confirmation Act 1949	12, 13 & 14 Geo. 6. c. lvii	16 December 1949
An Act to confirm a Provisional Order under the Private Legislation Procedure (Scotland) Act 1936 relating to Fife County Council.
	Fife County Council Order 1949 Provisional Order to consolidate with amendments the enactments relating to the supply of water by the county council of the county of Fife to provide for the transfer to the County Council of the water undertaking of the town council of the burgh of Markinch and of the waterworks of the Freuchie Water Company and the water supply from the Marl Pit at Dunshelt to extend the limits for the supply of water by the County Council and confer further powers upon them with regard to their water undertaking to authorise the County Council to acquire lands and construct waterworks and a sewer to constitute one special district in the county for the purpose of lighting to constitute the county a special district for the purposes of scavenging and drainage to provide for the establishment of a River Level Board to make provision in relation to the purification of the rivers and streams roads planning and amenities the valuation of lands and heritages weights and measures seashore public health parks and burial grounds to empower the County Council to borrow money and for other purposes.	
Stanley's Charity (West Bromwich) Scheme Confirmation Act 1949	12, 13 & 14 Geo. 6. c. lviii	16 December 1949
An Act to confirm a Scheme of the Charity Commissioners for the application or management of the Charity of Walter Stanley in the Ancient Parish of West Bromwich in the County of Stafford.
	Scheme for the Application or Management of the Charity of Walter Stanley in the Ancient Parish of West Bromwich in the County of Stafford Founded by Indenture of Feoffment dated the 12th March 1613 and comprised in Acts of Parliament 59 Geo. 3. c. lxxxvii (local and personal) (Note: Walter Stanley's Charity Estates Act 1819 (59 Geo. 3. c. 87 Pr.)) and 3 and 4 Vict. c. xxi (local and personal) (Note: Stanley's Charity Estate Act 1840 (3 & 4 Vict. c. 21 Pr.)) and a Scheme of the Charity Commissioners of the 7th October 1927.	
Shoreham Harbour Act 1949	12, 13 & 14 Geo. 6. c. lix	16 December 1949
An Act to authorise the Shoreham Harbour Trustees to construct harbour works and to acquire lands to alter the constitution of the Trustees and for other purposes.
River Great Ouse (Flood Protection) Act 1949	12, 13 & 14 Geo. 6. c. lx	16 December 1949
An Act to empower the River Great Ouse Catchment Board to construct works for the prevention of flooding within their catchment area and to acquire lands for the purposes of those works and for other purposes to authorise the Board to borrow money and for other purposes.

== See also ==
- List of acts of the Parliament of the United Kingdom
