= Education Act 1962 =

Act of the Parliament of the United Kingdom

Education Act 1962 (Note: Section 14(1).)
- Act of Parliament
- Parliament of the United Kingdom
- Long title: An Act to make further provision with respect to awards and grants by local education authorities and the Minister of Education in England and Wales, and by education authorities and the Secretary of State in Scotland, and to enable the General Grant Order, 1960, and the General Grant (Scotland) Order, 1960, to be varied so as to take account of additional or reduced expenditure resulting from action (including anticipatory action) taken in accordance with that provision; to make further provision as to school leaving dates; and for purposes connected with the matters aforesaid.
- Citation: 10 & 11 Eliz. 2. c. 12
- Territorial extent: England and Wales; Scotland; (Note: Section 14)

Dates
- Royal assent: 29 March 1962
- Commencement: 29 March 1962 (Note: The Acts of Parliament (Commencement) Act 1793.)
- Repealed: 1 January 1999
Other legislation
Amended by	Education (Scotland) Act 1962; Statute Law (Repeals) Act 1974; Statute Law (Repeals) Act 1975; Social Security (Consequential Provisions) Act 1975; Education Act 1976; Statute Law (Repeals) Act 1977; Statute Law (Repeals) Act 1978; Education (Grants and Awards) Act 1984; Education Act 1996
Repealed by	Teaching and Higher Education Act 1998
Relates to	Education Act 1944

Status: Repealed

Text of statute as originally enacted

Revised text of statute as amended

The Education Act 1962 (10 & 11 Eliz. 2. c. 12) was an act of the Parliament of the United Kingdom that gave local education authorities in the United Kingdom a mandate to pay the tuition of students attending full-time first degree (or comparable) courses and to provide them with a maintenance grant. No repayment was required.

Most local education authorities had already been paying students' tuition fees and providing maintenance grants since the Second World War. The act required both, in addition to providing for discretionary tuition payments to those entering further (vocational) education instead of universities (it was expected that the industrial training boards would pay the tuition for the majority of further education students, and that few would require maintenance since they usually studied part-time). The requirement that tuition be paid and the introduction of maintenance grants on a means-tested basis led to a great increase in the number of students attending university and enabled many to attend who would not otherwise have been able to afford it. The provisions of the act applied to students who were "ordinarily resident" in the local authority area; this was interpreted literally by the courts and in 1983 by the House of Lords, making many immigrants eligible. The act had a slight effect on the minimum age for leaving school by reducing to two the times during the year when a student was permitted to leave. The act was repealed in 1999, when tuition fees were introduced. As of 2024, state support for student finance is provided only by loans.

== Subsequent developments ==
Section 13(1) of, and schedule 2 to, the act were repealed by section 1 of, and part XI of the schedule to, the Statute Law (Repeals) Act 1974, which came into force on 27 June 1974.
