= Vehicles (Excise) Act 1949 =

Act of the Parliament of the United Kingdom

Vehicles (Excise) Act 1949 (Note: Section 31(1).)
- Act of Parliament
- Parliament of the United Kingdom
- Long title: An Act to consolidate certain enactments relating to excise duties on mechanically propelled vehicles, and to the licensing and registration of such vehicles, with such corrections and improvements as may be authorised under the Consolidation of Enactments (Procedure) Act, 1949.
- Citation: 12, 13 & 14 Geo. 6. c. 89
- Territorial extent: England and Wales; Scotland; (Note: Section 31(2).)

Dates
- Royal assent: 16 December 1949
- Commencement: 1 January 1950 (Note: Section 31(3).)
- Repealed: 1 April 1962
Other legislation
Amends	See § Repealed enactments
Repeals/revokes	See § Repealed enactments
Amended by	Statute Law Revision Act 1953
Repealed by	Vehicles (Excise) Act 1962

Status: Repealed

Text of statute as originally enacted

The Vehicles (Excise) Act 1949 (12, 13 & 14 Geo. 6. c. 89) was an act of the Parliament of the United Kingdom that consolidated enactments relating to excise duties on mechanically propelled vehicles, and to the licensing and registration of such vehicles, in Great Britain.

== Provisions ==
=== Repealed enactments ===
Section 30(1) of the act repealed 24 enactments, listed in the seventh schedule to the act.

Citation	Short title	Extent of repeal
10 & 11 Geo. 5. c. 18	Finance Act 1920	Section thirteen and the Second Schedule.
10 & 11 Geo. 5. c. 72	Roads Act 1920	Section one; in paragraph (a) of subsection (4) of section three the words "the levying of the duties, the registration of vehicles, and" and paragraphs (b) and (e) of that subsection; sections five and six; subsection (8) of section seven; sections eight, nine, eleven, twelve and thirteen; subsection (1) of section fourteen; and in section seventeen the definition of "prescribed" and "police authority".
11 & 12 Geo. 5. c. 32	Finance Act 1921	Section twenty-two.
12 & 13 Geo. 5. c. 17	Finance Act 1922	Sections fourteen and fifteen.
14 & 15 Geo. 5. c. 21	Finance Act 1924	Section eighteen.
16 & 17 Geo. 5. c. 22	Finance Act 1926	Sections thirteen and fourteen and the First Schedule.
17 & 18 Geo. 5. c. 10	Finance Act 1927	Sections eleven and twelve and the Fourth Schedule.
20 & 21 Geo. 5. c. 28	Finance Act 1930	Section six.
20 & 21 Geo. 5. c. 43	Road Traffic Act 1930	Section eighty-nine.
21 & 22 Geo. 5. c. 28	Finance Act 1931	Sections two and four.
22 & 23 Geo. 5. c. 25	Finance Act 1932	Section fourteen.
23 & 24 Geo. 5. c. 19	Finance Act 1933	Sections twenty-five and twenty-six and the Seventh Schedule.
24 & 25 Geo. 5. c. 32	Finance Act 1934	Section eighteen and the Third Schedule.
25 & 26 Geo. 5. c. 24	Finance Act 1935	Sections three and four.
26 Geo. 5 & 1 Edw. 8. c. 34	Finance Act 1936	Sections nine to thirteen, and paragraphs 2 and 4 of Part I of the Third Schedule.
1 Edw. 8 & 1 Geo. 6. c. 54	Finance Act 1937	Sections seven to nine.
2 & 3 Geo. 6. c. 41	Finance Act 1939	Sections nine and ten and the Eighth Schedule.
3 & 4 Geo. 6. c. 6	Gas and Steam Vehicles (Excise Duties) Act 1940	The whole act.
3 & 4 Geo. 6. c. 29	Finance Act 1940	Sections nine and ten.
6 & 7 Geo. 6. c. 28	Finance Act 1943	Sections seven to ten.
9 & 10 Geo. 6. c. 13	Finance (No. 2) Act 1945	Section four; paragraphs (a) and (b) of subsection (2) of section five; section six; and the Second Schedule.
9 & 10 Geo. 6. c. 64	Finance Act 1946	Section fourteen and the Second Schedule.
10 & 11 Geo. 6. c. 35	Finance Act 1947	Subsections (1), (2) and (4) of section eight, and section nine.
11 & 12 Geo. 6. c. 49	Finance Act 1948	Sections eighteen and nineteen.

== Subsequent developments ==
The whole act was repealed by section 25(2) of, and part I of the eighth schedule to, the Vehicles (Excise) Act 1962 (10 & 11 Eliz. 2. c. 13), which came into operation on 1 April 1962.
