= Public Bodies (Admission to Meetings) Act 1960 =

Act of the Parliament of the United Kingdom

Public Bodies (Admission to Meetings) Act 1960 (Note: Section 3(1).)
- Act of Parliament
- Parliament of the United Kingdom
- Long title: An Act to provide for the admission of representatives of the press and other members of the public to the meetings of certain bodies exercising public functions.
- Citation: 8 & 9 Eliz. 2. c. 67
- Introduced by: Margaret Thatcher
- Territorial extent: England and Wales; Scotland; (Note: Section 3(3).)

Dates
- Royal assent: 27 October 1960
- Commencement: 1 June 1961 (Note: Section 3(4).)
Other legislation
Amends	Local Authorities (Admission of the Press to Meetings) Act 1908; Local Government Act 1933; Education (Scotland) Act 1946
Amended by	Cable and Broadcasting Act 1984; Local Government (Access to Information) Act 1985; Broadcasting Act 1990; National Health Service (Consequential Provisions) Act 2006; Openness of Local Government Bodies Regulations 2014; Local Authorities (Coronavirus) (Meetings) (Wales) Regulations 2020

Status: Amended

Text of statute as originally enacted

Revised text of statute as amended

Text of the Public Bodies (Admission to Meetings) Act 1960 as in force today (including any amendments) within the United Kingdom, from legislation.gov.uk.

The Public Bodies (Admission to Meetings) Act 1960 (8 & 9 Eliz. 2. c. 67) is an act of the Parliament of the United Kingdom which allowed members of the public and press to attend meetings of certain public bodies. The act is notable for having been initiated as a private member's bill drawn up by Margaret Thatcher, and also for being introduced in a maiden speech, a unique feat for successful legislation. On 5 February 1960, Thatcher's speech was delivered without notes, and was lauded as the best maiden speech amongst the 1959 new intake.

The act was introduced primarily to prevent circumvention of rules prohibiting councils from excluding the press by calling a Committee of the Whole, a tactic that had been used by Labour-controlled councils during an industrial dispute in the printing industry in 1958. A similar bill had been introduced a number of years earlier by Lionel Heald, who helped guide Thatcher through the legislative process.
