= Education (Scotland) Act 1946 =

Act of the Parliament of the United Kingdom

Education (Scotland) Act 1946 (Note: Section 144(1).)
- Act of Parliament
- Parliament of the United Kingdom
- Long title: An Act to consolidate the enactments relating to education in Scotland.
- Citation: 9 & 10 Geo. 6. c. 72
- Territorial extent: Scotland (Note: Section 144(2).)

Dates
- Royal assent: 6 November 1946
- Commencement: 1 January 1947 (Note: Section 144(3). The provisions set out in the Seventh Schedule to the act came into operation on dates appointed by the Secretary of State.)
- Repealed: 1 October 1962
Other legislation
Amends	See § Repealed enactments
Repeals/revokes	See § Repealed enactments
Repealed by	National Health Service (Scotland) Act 1947; Acquisition of Land (Authorisation Procedure) (Scotland) Act 1947; Local Government (Scotland) Act 1947; Employment and Training Act 1948; Education (Scotland) Act 1949; Criminal Justice (Scotland) Act 1949; Statute Law Revision Act 1950; Teachers (Superannuation) Act 1956; Education (Scotland) Act 1956; Local Government and Miscellaneous Financial Provisions (Scotland) Act 1958; Mental Health Act 1959; Mental Health (Scotland) Act 1960; Public Bodies (Admission to Meetings) Act 1960; Local Government (Financial Provisions etc.) (Scotland) Act 1962; Education (Scotland) Act 1962
Relates to	Education Act 1946

Status: Repealed

Text of statute as originally enacted

The Education (Scotland) Act 1946 (9 & 10 Geo. 6. c. 72) was an act of the Parliament of the United Kingdom that consolidated enactments relating to education in Scotland.

== Provisions ==
=== Repealed enactments ===
Section 144(4) of the act repealed 26 enactments, listed in the eighth schedule to the act.

Citation	Short title	Extent of repeal
35 & 36 Vict. c. 62	Education (Scotland) Act 1872	The whole act so far as unrepealed.
36 & 37 Vict. c. 53	Highland Schools Act 1873	The whole act so far as unrepealed.
45 & 46 Vict. c. 59	Educational Endowments (Scotland) Act 1882	The whole act so far as unrepealed.
52 & 53 Vict. c. 50	Local Government (Scotland) Act 1889	Section eighty-seven.
1 Edw. 7. c. 9	Education (Scotland) Act 1901	The whole act so far as unrepealed.
8 Edw. 7. c. 63	Education (Scotland) Act 1908	The whole act so far as unrepealed.
8 & 9 Geo. 5. c. 48	Education (Scotland) Act 1918	The whole act so far as unrepealed except sections three and seventeen, in section thirty-one, paragraph (1) so far as necessary for the interpretation of section three, in section thirty-two, subsection (1) so far as it relates to the Third Schedule, section thirty-three, and the Third Schedule.
9 & 10 Geo. 5. c. 17	Education (Scotland) (Superannuation) Act 1919	The whole act so far as unrepealed.
10 & 11 Geo. 5. c. 49	Blind Persons Act 1920	In section four, in subsection (1), paragraph (b).
12 & 13 Geo. 5. c. 48	Education (Scotland) (Superannuation) Act 1922	The whole act.
14 & 15 Geo. 5. c. 13	Education (Scotland) (Superannuation) Act 1924	The whole act.
15 & 16 Geo. 5. c. 55	Education (Scotland) (Superannuation) Act 1925	The whole act so far as unrepealed.
15 & 16 Geo. 5. c. 89	Education (Scotland) Act 1925	Section one.
16 & 17 Geo. 5. c. 47	Rating (Scotland) Act 1926	Section six.
18 & 19 Geo. 5. c. 30	Educational Endowments (Scotland) Act 1928	The whole act so far as unrepealed.
19 & 20 Geo. 5. c. 25	Local Government (Scotland) Act 1929	In section twelve, in paragraph (c) of subsection (3), the words from "Where a county or town council" to the end of the subsection; section thirty-one; in section fifty-two, subsection (4); in the Third Schedule, paragraph 14; and in the Sixth Schedule the first paragraph (which relates to payments to the Education (Scotland) Fund).
22 & 23 Geo. 5. c. 5	Educational Endowments (Scotland) Act 1931	The whole act.
23 & 24 Geo. 5. c. 22	Teachers (Superannuation) Act 1933	The whole act so far as unrepealed.
25 & 26 Geo. 5. c. 35	Teachers (Superannuation) Act 1935	The whole act.
25 & 26 Geo. 5. c. 5	Educational Endowments (Scotland) Act 1935	The whole act.
25 & 26 Geo. 5. c. 8	Unemployment Insurance Act 1935	Sections seventy-six and seventy-eight; in section seventy-nine, in subsection (1), the words "and contribute towards the cost of any other authorised courses"; in section eighty, in subsection (1), the words "persons who have not attained the age of eighteen years and of" and the words "who have attained that age," and in subsection (2), paragraph (a); in section eighty-three, subsections (2) and (3); in section eighty-seven as amended by the Fourth Schedule to the Act of 1945, subsection (5); in section one hundred and four, in subsection (2), the words "section seventy-eight or"; section one hundred and twelve; and in section one hundred and thirteen, in paragraph (b) of subsection (1) as amended by the Fourth Schedule to the Act of 1945, the words "a course at a junior college established under the enactments relating to education or".
26 Geo. 5 & 1 Edw. 8. c. 42	Education (Scotland) Act 1936	The whole act so far as unrepealed except sections sixteen and eighteen and the schedule so far as it relates to the amendment of section three of, and paragraph 3 of the Third Schedule to, the Act of 1918.
1 Edw. 8 & 1 Geo. 6. c. 47	Teachers (Superannuation) Act 1937	Section four; and in section five, in subsection (1), from the words "and in so far as it relates to Scotland" to the end of the subsection.
1 & 2 Geo. 6. c. 8	Unemployment Insurance Act 1938	Sections one and six.
5 & 6 Geo. 6. c. 5	Education (Scotland) Act 1942	The whole act.
8 & 9 Geo. 6. c. 37	Education (Scotland) Act 1945	The whole act except section forty-four, in section eighty-six, subsection (3), in section eighty-seven, subsection (1) so far as necessary for the interpretation of section forty-four, and subsection (2), in section eighty-nine, subsections (1) and (3), and the Fourth Schedule in so far as it amends (a) the Mental Deficiency and Lunacy (Scotland) Act 1913; (b) the Local Government (Scotland) Act 1929, sections three, twelve, fourteen and seventeen; (c) the Unemployment Insurance Act 1935, section one hundred and thirteen and the First Schedule; (d) the National Health Insurance Act 1936; (e) the Children and Young Persons (Scotland) Act 1937; (f) the Factories Act 1937; and (g) the Education (Scotland) (War Service Superannuation) Act 1939.

== Subsequent developments ==
The whole act was repealed by section 147 of, and the eighth schedule to, the Education (Scotland) Act 1962 (10 & 11 Eliz. 2. c. 47), which came into operation on 1 October 1962.
