= Maiden speech =

Introductory speech of a newly elected member of a legislature

A maiden speech is the first speech given by a newly elected or appointed member of a legislature or parliament.

Traditions surrounding maiden speeches vary from country to country. In many Westminster system governments, there is a convention that maiden speeches should be relatively uncontroversial, often consisting of a general statement of the politician's beliefs and background rather than a partisan comment on a current topic.

This convention is not always followed, however. For example, the maiden speeches of Pauline Hanson in the Australian House of Representatives in 1996, Fraser Anning in the Australian Senate in 2018 and Richard Nixon in the United States House of Representatives in 1947, broke the tradition. Margaret Thatcher's maiden speech in the House of Commons in 1959 included the successful introduction of the bill which became the Public Bodies (Admission to Meetings) Act 1960.

There is also a strong convention in some countries, such as in the Netherlands, that maiden speeches should not be subjected to interruption or interjection, and should not be attacked or dismissed by subsequent speakers, unless specifically stated by the speaker that they denounce that right, which happens on occasion should the maiden speech take place in a crucial debate. Another convention in the British House of Commons is that a member of parliament will include tribute in a maiden speech to previous incumbents of their seat.

Some countries, notably Australia, no longer formally describe a politician's first speech as a "maiden" speech, referring only to it as a "first" speech. The Australian Parliament website and Hansard records no longer use "maiden" as a term, but the word remains common in discourse and colloquial use.

== UK House of Commons ==
The first maiden speeches following general elections were:

Election	Date	Name	Party	Hansard
2010	25 May 2010	Richard Harrington	Con	
2015	27 May 2015	Brendan O'Hara	SNP	
2017	21 June 2017	Vicky Ford	Con	
2019	19 December 2019	Colum Eastwood	SDLP	
2024	17 July 2024	Kirith Entwistle	Labour	
