= Vehicles (Excise) Act 1971 =

Act of the Parliament of the United Kingdom

Vehicles (Excise) Act 1971 (Note: Section 40(1).)
- Act of Parliament
- Parliament of the United Kingdom
- Long title: An Act to consolidate certain enactments relating to excise duties on mechanically propelled vehicles, and to the licensing and registration of such vehicles with amendments to give effect to recommendations of the Law Commission and the Scottish Law Commission.
- Citation: 1971 c. 10
- Territorial extent: England and Wales; Scotland; (Note: Section 40(3).)

Dates
- Royal assent: 16 March 1971
- Commencement: 1 October 1974 (Note: Section 40(2). The transfer date (within the meaning of section 1(2) of the Vehicle and Driving Licences Act 1969) was 1 October 1974.)
- Repealed: 1 September 1994

Other legislation
- Amends: See § Repealed enactments
- Repeals/revokes: See § Repealed enactments
- Amended by: Criminal Justice Act 1972; Law Reform (Miscellaneous Provisions) (Scotland) Act 1985
- Repealed by: Vehicle Excise and Registration Act 1994

Status: Repealed

Text of statute as originally enacted

The Vehicles (Excise) Act 1971 (c. 10) was an act of the Parliament of the United Kingdom that consolidated enactments relating to excise duties on mechanically propelled vehicles, and to the licensing and registration of such vehicles, in Great Britain.

== Provisions ==
=== Repealed enactments ===
Section 39(5) of the act repealed 15 enactments, listed in part I of the eighth schedule to the act, and revoked one order, listed in part II of that schedule.

Citation	Short title	Extent of repeal
10 & 11 Eliz. 2. c. 13	Vehicles (Excise) Act 1962	The whole act except section 25(1) and Schedule 7.
10 & 11 Eliz. 2. c. 44	Finance Act 1962	Section 5.
1964 c. 49	Finance Act 1964	Section 11.
1965 c. 25	Finance Act 1965	Section 5 so far as unrepealed, sections 6 and 7 and Schedule 5 Pt. V.
1965 c. 66	Hire-Purchase Act 1965	In Schedule 5, the amendment of the Vehicles (Excise) Act 1962.
1965 c. 67	Hire-Purchase (Scotland) Act 1965	In Schedule 5, the amendment of the Vehicles (Excise) Act 1962.
1966 c. 18	Finance Act 1966	Section 8.
1967 c. 30	Road Safety Act 1967	Section 27.
1967 c. 54	Finance Act 1967	Sections 11 and 12.
1967 c. 70	Road Traffic (Amendment) Act 1967	Section 4(4).
1968 c. 44	Finance Act 1968	Sections 8 and 9 and Schedule 7.
1968 c. 73	Transport Act 1968	Section 147.
1969 c. 27	Vehicle and Driving Licences Act 1969	Sections 4 to 12. Section 17. Section 19. In section 20, subsections (1) to (4) and in subsection (5) the words from the beginning to "to the vehicle;". Section 21. In section 23, paragraphs (d), (e) and (f) of subsection (1) and subsection (2) so far as it amends the Vehicles (Excise) Act 1962. Section 24. In section 25, subsections (1) to (5), in subsection (6) the words "this Act, the Act of 1962 or" and subsection (7). In section 26, subsections (1) and (2), in subsection (3) the words "by or" and "this Act, the Act of 1962 or" and subsections (4) to (8). Section 27 in so far as it relates to records maintained in connection with functions conferred on local authorities by the Vehicles (Excise) Act 1962 and transferred to the Secretary of State by order under section 1 of the Vehicle and Driving Licences Act 1969 or with any functions exercisable by the Secretary of State by virtue of the said Act of 1969 except sections 1 to 3 thereof. Section 28. In section 29, subsections (1) and (2). Section 30. Section 32 except so far as it relates to offences against section 22 of that Act. In section 33 the definitions of "motor dealer", "public road", "trade licence", "seven day licence", "temporary licence" and "vehicle licence". In section 34, in subsection (2) the words "or the Act of 1962" and subsection (5). In section 35, the words "section 21(2) or". Section 36(2). In Schedule 1, paragraphs 4 to 8, 11 and 13 to 18.
1969 c. 32	Finance Act 1969	Section 6 and Schedule 12.
1970 c. 24	Finance Act 1970	Section 9.

== Subsequent developments ==
The whole act was repealed by section 65 of, and part I of schedule 5 to, the Vehicle Excise and Registration Act 1994, which came into force on 1 September 1994.
