= Education (Scotland) Act 1962 =

Act of the Parliament of the United Kingdom

Education (Scotland) Act 1962 (Note: Section 149(1).)
- Act of Parliament
- Parliament of the United Kingdom
- Long title: An Act to consolidate the enactments relating to education in Scotland.
- Citation: 10 & 11 Eliz. 2. c. 47
- Territorial extent: Scotland (Note: Section 149(2).)

Dates
- Royal assent: 1 August 1962
- Commencement: 1 October 1962 (Note: Section 148(1). The provisions set out in the Ninth Schedule to the act came into operation on dates appointed by the Secretary of State.)
Other legislation
Amends	See § Repealed enactments
Repeals/revokes	See § Repealed enactments
Amended by	Education (Scotland) Act 1963; Statute Law Revision (Consequential Repeals) Act 1965; Social Work (Scotland) Act 1968; Statute Law (Repeals) Act 1974; Statute Law (Repeals) Act 1978; Education (Scotland) Act 1980
Relates to	Education Act 1962

Status: Partially repealed

Text of statute as originally enacted

Revised text of statute as amended

Text of the Education (Scotland) Act 1962 as in force today (including any amendments) within the United Kingdom, from legislation.gov.uk.

The Education (Scotland) Act 1962 (10 & 11 Eliz. 2. c. 47) is an act of the Parliament of the United Kingdom that consolidated enactments relating to education in Scotland.

== Provisions ==
=== Repealed enactments ===
Section 147 of the act repealed 11 enactments, listed in the eighth schedule to the act.

Citation	Short title	Extent of repeal
8 & 9 Geo. 5. c. 48	Education (Scotland) Act 1918	The whole act so far as unrepealed.
9 & 10 Geo. 6. c. 72	Education (Scotland) Act 1946	The whole act so far as unrepealed.
10 & 11 Geo. 6. c. 27	National Health Service (Scotland) Act 1947	Eleventh Schedule, Part I, in so far as it relates to the Education (Scotland) Act, 1946.
12, 13 & 14 Geo. 6. c. 19	Education (Scotland) Act 1949	The whole act.
12, 13 & 14 Geo. 6. c. 94	Criminal Justice (Scotland) Act 1949	Twelfth Schedule, in so far as it relates to the Education (Scotland) Act, 1946.
4 & 5 Eliz. 2. c. 53	Teachers (Superannuation) Act 1956	Sections twenty-seven to thirty-six so far as unrepealed; in section forty, the words "or the Education (Scotland) Acts, 1939 to 1956".
4 & 5 Eliz. 2. c. 75	Education (Scotland) Act 1956	The whole act.
6 & 7 Eliz. 2. c. 64	Local Government and Miscellaneous Financial Provisions (Scotland) Act 1958	In section five, subsections (1) and (3); section fourteen; in the Fourth Schedule, in Part I, paragraph 6; in Part III, paragraph 24, in so far as it relates to paragraph 6 of Part I; in the Fifth Schedule, paragraphs 2 to 7.
7 & 8 Eliz. 2. c. 72	Mental Health Act 1959	The Eighth Schedule, Part II, in so far as it relates to the Education (Scotland) Act, 1946.
8 & 9 Eliz. 2. c. 61	Mental Health (Scotland) Act 1960	Section eleven; the First Schedule; the Fifth Schedule, in so far as it relates to the Education (Scotland) Act, 1945, the Education (Scotland) Act, 1946, the Education (Scotland) Act, 1949.
10 & 11 Eliz. 2. c. 12	Education Act 1962	Sections five, six and ten.

== Subsequent developments ==
Schedule 8 to the act, together with words in section 147, were repealed by section 1 of, and part XI of the schedule to, the Statute Law (Repeals) Act 1974, which came into force on 27 June 1974.

The whole act, except sections 136 and 137, subsections (7), (16), (18), (19), (33) and (42) of section 145, section 149(1) and (2) and section 148(2) and schedule 9 so far as they relate to section 136, was repealed by section 136(3) of, and schedule 5 to, the Education (Scotland) Act 1980, which came into force on 1 September 1980.
