= Vehicles (Excise) Act 1962 =

Act of the Parliament of the United Kingdom

Vehicles (Excise) Act 1962 (Note: Section 26(1).)
- Act of Parliament
- Parliament of the United Kingdom
- Long title: An Act to consolidate certain enactments relating to excise duties on mechanically propelled vehicles, and to the licensing and registration of such vehicles,
- Citation: 10 & 11 Eliz. 2. c. 13
- Territorial extent: England and Wales; Scotland; (Note: Section 26(2).)

Dates
- Royal assent: 29 March 1962
- Commencement: 1 April 1962 (Note: Section 26(3).)
- Repealed: 13 March 1975
Other legislation
Amends	See § Repealed enactments
Repeals/revokes	See § Repealed enactments
Amended by	Finance Act 1969; Road Traffic Act 1972
Repealed by	Vehicles (Excise) Act 1971; Statute Law (Repeals) Act 1975

Status: Repealed

Text of statute as originally enacted

The Vehicles (Excise) Act 1962 (10 & 11 Eliz. 2. c. 13) was an act of the Parliament of the United Kingdom that consolidated enactments relating to excise duties on mechanically propelled vehicles, and to the licensing and registration of such vehicles, in Great Britain.

== Repealed enactments ==
Section 25(2) of the act repealed 15 enactments and 3 orders, listed in parts I and II of the eighth schedule to the act, respectively.

Part I - Enactments repealed
Citation	Short title	Extent of repeal
12, 13 & 14 Geo. 6. c. 89	Vehicles (Excise) Act 1949	The whole act.
14 Geo. 6. c. 15	Finance Act 1950	Section thirteen. The Third Schedule.
15 & 16 Geo. 6 & 1 Eliz. 2. c. 33	Finance Act 1952	Section seven.
15 & 16 Geo. 6 & 1 Eliz. 2. c. 39	Motor Vehicles (International Circulation) Act 1952	In section three, subsection (1) and, in subsection (3), the words "the said subsection (3) or".
15 & 16 Geo. 6 & 1 Eliz. 2. c. 44	Customs and Excise Act 1952	In the Tenth Schedule, in Part I, paragraph 32.
1 & 2 Eliz. 2. c. 34	Finance Act 1953	Sections five and six.
4 & 5 Eliz. 2. c. 54	Finance Act 1956	Section five.
5 & 6 Eliz. 2. c. 49	Finance Act 1957	Section seven.
6 & 7 Eliz. 2. c. 55	Local Government Act 1958	In section four, in subsection (2), paragraph (f).
6 & 7 Eliz. 2. c. 56	Finance Act 1958	Sections seven to nine.
6 & 7 Eliz. 2. c. 64	Local Government and Miscellaneous Financial Provisions (Scotland) Act 1958	In section four, in subsection (2), paragraph (d).
7 & 8 Eliz. 2. c. 58	Finance Act 1959	In section seven, in subsection (4), the words from "and in" to the end of the subsection. Sections ten to fourteen. The Third Schedule.
8 & 9 Eliz. 2. c. 44	Finance Act 1960	Sections eleven to fourteen.
9 & 10 Eliz. 2. c. 15	Post Office Act 1961	In the Schedule, the amendment of section twenty-four of the Vehicles (Excise) Act, 1949.
9 & 10 Eliz. 2. c. 36	Finance Act 1961	Sections six to eight. The Second Schedule.

Part II - Orders revoked
Citation	Short title	Extent of repeal
SI 1960/1023	Road Vehicles (Period Licensing) Order 1960	The whole order.
SI 1960/1640	Road Vehicles (Period Licensing) (Variation) Order 1960	The whole order.
SI 1961/774	Road Vehicles (Period Licensing) (Variation) Order 1961	The whole order.

== Subsequent developments ==
The whole act, except section 25(1) and schedule 7, was repealed by section 39(5) of, and part I of the eighth schedule to, the Vehicles (Excise) Act 1971, which came into force on 1 October 1974.

The whole act was repealed by section 1(1) of, and part X of the schedule to, the Statute Law (Repeals) Act 1975, which came into force on 13 March 1975.
