= Food and Drugs (Milk, Dairies and Artificial Cream) Act 1950 =

Act of the Parliament of the United Kingdom

Food and Drugs (Milk, Dairies and Artificial Cream) Act 1950 (Note: Section 38(1).)
- Act of Parliament
- Parliament of the United Kingdom
- Long title: An Act to consolidate certain enactments relating to milk, dairies and artificial cream.
- Citation: 14 Geo. 6. c. 35
- Territorial extent: England and Wales (Note: Section 37.)

Dates
- Royal assent: 26 October 1950
- Commencement: 1 January 1951 (Note: Section 38(2).)
- Repealed: 22 November 1955
Other legislation
Amends	See § Repealed enactments
Repeals/revokes	See § Repealed enactments
Repealed by	Food and Drugs Act 1955

Status: Repealed

Text of statute as originally enacted

The Food and Drugs (Milk, Dairies and Artificial Cream) Act 1950 (14 Geo. 6. c. 35) was an act of the Parliament of the United Kingdom that consolidated enactments related to milk, dairies and artificial cream in England and Wales.

== Provisions ==
=== Repealed enactments ===
Section 36(1) of the act repealed 6 enactments, listed in the fifth schedule to the act.

Citation	Short title	Extent of repeal
1 Edw. 8 & 1 Geo. 6. c. 70	Agriculture Act 1937	In section nineteen, in subsection (1), the words "and any enactments relating to milk or to dairies".
1 & 2 Geo. 6. c. 56	Food and Drugs Act 1938	The whole of Part I. In section sixty-five, in subsection (1), paragraphs (b) and (c). In section ninety-two, in subsection (1), the words "Milk and Dairies Regulations". In the First Schedule, Part I.
7 & 8 Geo. 6. c. 29	Food and Drugs (Milk and Dairies) Act 1944	Sections one to four. In section eight, in subsection (1) all the definitions except that of war service; and subsection (2). The Schedule.
12 & 13 Geo. 6. c. 34	Milk (Special Designations) Act 1949	The whole act.
12 & 13 Geo. 6. c. 37	Agriculture (Miscellaneous Provisions) Act 1949	Section seven. In the Schedule, Part I.
S.I. 1948 No. 107	Transfer of Functions (Food and Drugs) Order 1948	Articles three, four and five. In article six, paragraph (2).

== Subsequent developments ==
The whole act was repealed by section 136(1) of, and the eleventh schedule to, the Food and Drugs Act 1955 (4 & 5 Eliz. 2. c. 16), which came into force on 22 November 1955.
