= List of acts of the 3rd session of the 42nd Parliament of the United Kingdom =

This is a list of acts of the 3rd session of the 42nd Parliament of the United Kingdom, which ran from 31 October 1961 until 25 October 1962.

Acts passed before 1963 are cited by the regnal year(s) in which the relevant parliamentary session was held, as opposed to the convention used for later acts of citing the calendar year. Each act passed in a respective session is given a chapter number (abbreviated "c."), denoted by Arabic numerals in the case of public general acts, lowercase Roman numerals in the case of local acts, or italicised Arabic numerals in the case of personal acts. These run as separate series.

112 acts of Parliament were passed by the 42nd Parliament in its 3rd session: 59 public general acts and 53 local acts.

indicates that an act has been transcribed on Wikisource, indicates that an act is available to view at legislation.gov.uk, and indicates the location of the original act in the Parliamentary Archives.

== Public general acts ==
Short title	Citation	Royal assent
Long title
Tanganyika Independence Act 1961	10 & 11 Eliz. 2. c. 1	22 November 1961
An Act to make provision for, and in connection with, the attainment by Tanganyika of fully responsible status within the Commonwealth.
Southern Rhodesia (Constitution) Act 1961	10 & 11 Eliz. 2. c. 2	22 November 1961
An Act to provide for the grant of a new constitution for Southern Rhodesia.
Export Guarantees Act 1961	10 & 11 Eliz. 2. c. 3	20 December 1961
An Act to increase the limit imposed by section two of the Export Guarantees Act, 1949, as amended by any subsequent enactment, on the liabilities which may be undertaken by the Board of Trade in respect of guarantees under that section and certain other transactions under the Export Guarantees Acts, 1949 to 1959.
Expiring Laws Continuance Act 1961	10 & 11 Eliz. 2. c. 4	20 December 1961
An Act to continue certain expiring laws.
Coal Industry Act 1961	10 & 11 Eliz. 2. c. 5	20 December 1961
An Act to make provision until the end of the year nineteen hundred and sixty-two for financing any accumulated revenue deficit of the National Coal Board.
Family Allowances and National Insurance Act 1961	10 & 11 Eliz. 2. c. 6	20 December 1961
An Act to improve and extend the allowances payable out of the Industrial Injuries Fund in respect of injury or disease arising out of pre-1948 employment; to amend the National Insurance (Industrial Injuries) Acts, 1946 to 1960, and the National Insurance Acts, 1946 to 1960, as regards the circumstances giving a right to or affecting the continuance or rate of certain benefits, as regards the references in certain provisions relating to contributions to an income not exceeding one hundred and fifty-six pounds a year or to remuneration not exceeding sixty shillings a week, and as regards matters connected with the administration of the Acts and the making and operation of orders and regulations thereunder; to make further provision as to sums wrongly paid by way of benefit under those Acts or by way of family allowance; to alter the meaning in those Acts and the Family Allowances Acts, 1945 to 1959, of the word "child"; to provide for certain expenses of the Minister of Pensions and National Insurance; and for purposes connected therewith.
Consolidated Fund Act 1962	10 & 11 Eliz. 2. c. 7	21 February 1962
An Act to apply a sum out of the Consolidated Fund to the service of the year ending on the thirty-first day of March, one thousand nine hundred and sixty-two.
Civil Aviation (Eurocontrol) Act 1962 (repealed)	10 & 11 Eliz. 2. c. 8	21 February 1962
An Act to make provision in connection with the international convention relating to co-operation for the safety of air navigation, known as the Eurocontrol Convention; to provide for the recovery of charges for services provided for aircraft; to authorize the use of certain records as evidence in proceedings for the recovery of such charges or proceedings under the Air Navigation Order; and for purposes connected with the matters aforesaid. (Repealed by Civil Aviation Act 1982 (c. 16))
Local Government (Financial Provisions etc.) (Scotland) Act 1962	10 & 11 Eliz. 2. c. 9	21 February 1962
An Act to provide in respect of the year 1961–62 for revision of the apportionment of expenditure and of general grants among local authorities in Scotland; to make further provision as respects Scotland with respect to the amounts payable in lieu of rates or by way of rates by the British Transport Commission, Electricity Boards and Gas Boards, with respect to relief from rates of charitable and other similar bodies, with respect to sums borrowed by local authorities and with respect to Valuation Appeal Committees, demand notes for rates, and corrections of the valuation roll; and for purposes connected with the matters aforesaid.
Army Reserve Act 1962 (repealed)	10 & 11 Eliz. 2. c. 10	15 March 1962
An Act to make further provision with respect to reserves for the regular army. (Repealed by Reserve Forces Act 1980 (c. 9))
Consolidated Fund (No. 2) Act 1962	10 & 11 Eliz. 2. c. 11	29 March 1962
An Act to apply certain sums out of the Consolidated Fund to the service of the years ending on the thirty-first day of March, one thousand nine hundred and sixty-one, one thousand nine hundred and sixty-two and one thousand nine hundred and sixty-three.
Education Act 1962	10 & 11 Eliz. 2. c. 12	29 March 1962
An Act to make further provision with respect to awards and grants by local education authorities and the Minister of Education in England and Wales, and by education authorities and the Secretary of State in Scotland, and to enable the General Grant Order, 1960, and the General Grant (Scotland) Order, 1960, to be varied so as to take account of additional or reduced expenditure resulting from action (including anticipatory action) taken in accordance with that provision; to make further provision as to school leaving dates; and for purposes connected with the matters aforesaid.
Vehicles (Excise) Act 1962 (repealed)	10 & 11 Eliz. 2. c. 13	29 March 1962
An Act to consolidate certain enactments relating to excise duties on mechanically propelled vehicles, and to the licensing and registration of such vehicles. (Repealed by Vehicles (Excise) Act 1971 (c. 10) and Statute Law (Repeals) Act 1975 (c. 10))
Telegraph Act 1962	10 & 11 Eliz. 2. c. 14	29 March 1962
An Act to consolidate certain enactments empowering the Postmaster General to regulate the use of telegraphs and the general conduct of telegraphic business.
Criminal Justice Administration Act 1962	10 & 11 Eliz. 2. c. 15	29 March 1962
An Act to provide for the appointment of additional puisne judges of the High Court, of assistant clerks of assize and of a sheriff for part of the West Riding of York; to amend the law relating to courts of quarter sessions and to the administration of criminal justice in England and Wales; and for purposes connected with those matters.
Forth and Clyde Canal (Extinguishment of Rights of Navigation) Act 1962	10 & 11 Eliz. 2. c. 16	29 March 1962
An Act to extinguish any right of navigation on the Forth and Clyde Canal, and the obligations upon the British Transport Commission to keep that canal open and to maintain it for purposes of navigation.
Commonwealth Settlement Act 1962	10 & 11 Eliz. 2. c. 17	29 March 1962
An Act to extend the period for which the Secretary of State may make contributions under schemes agreed under section one of the Empire Settlement Act, 1922.
British Museum Act 1962 (repealed)	10 & 11 Eliz. 2. c. 18	18 April 1962
An Act to enable the Trustees of the British Museum to lend certain works of art for exhibition in Vienna under the auspices of the Council of Europe. (Repealed by British Museum Act 1963 (c. 24))
West Indies Act 1962	10 & 11 Eliz. 2. c. 19	18 April 1962
An Act to enable provision to be made for the cesser of the inclusion of colonies in the federation established under the British Caribbean Federation Act, 1956, and for the dissolution of that federation and for matters consequential on the happening of either of those events; to enable provision to be made for the establishment of common courts and other authorities for, and fresh provision to be made for the government of, certain West Indian colonies; to enable provision to be made for the establishment of new forms of government for combinations of such colonies; and for purposes connected with the matters aforesaid.
International Monetary Fund Act 1962	10 & 11 Eliz. 2. c. 20	18 April 1962
An Act to enable the United Kingdom to take part in arrangements under which the International Monetary Fund may borrow supplementary resources from its members.
Commonwealth Immigrants Act 1962	10 & 11 Eliz. 2. c. 21	18 April 1962
An Act to make temporary provision for controlling the immigration into the United Kingdom of Commonwealth citizens; to authorise the deportation from the United Kingdom of certain Commonwealth citizens convicted of offences and recommended by the court for deportation; to amend the qualifications required of Commonwealth citizens applying for citizenship under the British Nationality Act, 1948; to make corresponding provisions in respect of British protected persons and citizens of the Republic of Ireland; and for purposes connected with the matters aforesaid.
Coal Consumers' Councils (Northern Irish Interests) Act 1962	10 & 11 Eliz. 2. c. 22	24 May 1962
An Act to provide for the appointment to the Industrial Coal Consumers' Council and the Domestic Coal Consumers' Council of persons to represent Northern Irish interests.
South Africa Act 1962	10 & 11 Eliz. 2. c. 23	24 May 1962
An Act to make final provision as to the operation of the law in consequence of the Union of South Africa having become a republic outside the Commonwealth.
National Assistance Act 1948 (Amendment) Act 1962	10 & 11 Eliz. 2. c. 24	24 May 1962
An Act to amend section thirty-one of the National Assistance Act, 1948, and to empower local authorities to provide meals and recreation for old people; and for purposes connected therewith.
Police Federations Act 1962 (repealed)	10 & 11 Eliz. 2. c. 25	24 May 1962
An Act to amend the law relating to the constitution and proceedings of the Police Federations. (Repealed by Police Act 1964 (c. 48))
Animals (Cruel Poisons) Act 1962	10 & 11 Eliz. 2. c. 26	3 July 1962
An Act to prohibit the killing of animals by cruel poisons; and for purposes connected therewith.
Recorded Delivery Service Act 1962	10 & 11 Eliz. 2. c. 27	3 July 1962
An Act to authorise the sending by the recorded delivery service of certain documents and other things required or authorised to be sent by registered post; and for purposes connected therewith.
Housing (Scotland) Act 1962 (repealed)	10 & 11 Eliz. 2. c. 28	3 July 1962
An Act to make further arrangements for the giving of financial assistance for the provision and improvement of housing accommodation in Scotland and for building experiments in connection therewith; to amend as respects Scotland the law relating to the permitted increase of rent in respect of improvements, to houses unfit for human habitation, and to the obligations of lessors and lessees as to repairs under short leases of houses; to make further provision for default of Scottish local authorities in their duties as to the fixing of rents; to amend in minor particulars the Housing (Scotland) Act, 1950; to enable the Secretary of State to acquire shares of authorised societies within the meaning of the Housing Act, 1914, and to dispose of moneys accruing to him from those and other shares; and for purposes connected with any of those matters. (Repealed by Housing (Scotland) Act 1987 (c. 26))
Agricultural and Forestry Associations Act 1962	10 & 11 Eliz. 2. c. 29	3 July 1962
An Act to provide that certain agreements made by or between members of associations of persons occupying land used for agriculture or forestry shall be exempted from the application of Part I of the Restrictive Trade Practices Act, 1956.
Northern Ireland Act 1962	10 & 11 Eliz. 2. c. 30	3 July 1962
An Act to amend with regard to certain matters, and empower Her Majesty in Council to amend with regard to others, the law concerning the administration of justice in Northern Ireland; to enlarge the legislative power of the Parliament of Northern Ireland; to amend other law applicable to Northern Ireland; to lay down a rule for interpreting, in the application to Northern Ireland of Acts of Parliament, certain expressions commonly used therein; and to repeal obsolete, unnecessary or spent enactments applying to Northern Ireland.
Sea Fish Industry Act 1962	10 & 11 Eliz. 2. c. 31	3 July 1962
An Act to make further provision, by way of financial assistance and otherwise, with respect to the white fish and herring industries, including provision relating to the White Fish Authority and the Herring Industry Board; to make further provision for the regulation of fishing for, and the landing and commercial use of, sea-fish, and with respect to shellfish; to enable the charges leviable at certain harbours to be varied, and to facilitate borrowing for certain harbour and marine work undertakings; and for purposes connected with the matters aforesaid.
Marriage (Wales and Monmouthshire) Act 1962	10 & 11 Eliz. 2. c. 32	3 July 1962
An Act to extend certain provisions of the Marriage Act, 1949, to Wales and Monmouthshire.
Health Visiting and Social Work (Training) Act 1962	10 & 11 Eliz. 2. c. 33	3 July 1962
An Act to establish two Councils with functions relating to the training of health visitors and training in social work; to extend the powers of the Minister of Health, the Secretary of State and local authorities with respect to research into matters of social welfare; and for purposes connected therewith.
Acts of Parliament Numbering and Citation Act 1962	10 & 11 Eliz. 2. c. 34	19 July 1962
An Act to provide for the numbering and citation of future Acts of Parliament by reference to the calendar year in which they are passed.
Shops (Airports) Act 1962	10 & 11 Eliz. 2. c. 35	19 July 1962
An Act to exempt shops at certain airports, and the carrying on of any retail trade or business in connection with such shops, from the provisions of Part I of the Shops Act, 1950; and for purposes connected therewith.
Local Authorities (Historic Buildings) Act 1962	10 & 11 Eliz. 2. c. 36	19 July 1962
An Act to make provision for contributions by local authorities towards the repair and maintenance of buildings of historic or architectural interest and the upkeep of gardens occupied therewith; and for purposes connected therewith.
Building Societies Act 1962	10 & 11 Eliz. 2. c. 37	19 July 1962
An Act to consolidate (with corrections and improvements made under the Consolidation of Enactments (Procedure) Act, 1949) the Building Societies Acts, 1874 to 1960, and certain related enactments, except certain provisions of those Acts relating to the winding up of building societies and provisions relating to unincorporated societies.
Town and Country Planning Act 1962 (repealed)	10 & 11 Eliz. 2. c. 38	19 July 1962
An Act to consolidate certain enactments relating to town and country planning in England and Wales. (Repealed by Town and Country Planning Act 1971 (c. 78))
Drainage Rates Act 1962 (repealed)	10 & 11 Eliz. 2. c. 39	19 July 1962
An Act to authorise the use of an alternative method of assessing drainage rates in the case of land falling within subsection (4) of section twenty-two of the Land Drainage Act, 1961. (Repealed by Land Drainage Act 1976 (c. 70))
Jamaica Independence Act 1962	10 & 11 Eliz. 2. c. 40	19 July 1962
An Act to make provision for, and in connection with, the attainment by Jamaica of fully responsible status within the Commonwealth.
Colonial Loans Act 1962 (repealed)	10 & 11 Eliz. 2. c. 41	19 July 1962
An Act to amend the Colonial Loans Acts, 1949 and 1952. (Repealed by International Development Association Act 1960 (c. 63))
Law Reform (Damages and Solatium) (Scotland) Act 1962	10 & 11 Eliz. 2. c. 42	19 July 1962
An Act to amend the law of Scotland relating to damages and solatium by extending the entitlement of parents to sue in respect of the death of a child, and to remove a doubt as to the title of a child to sue in respect of the death of his mother while his father is alive.
Carriage by Air (Supplementary Provisions) Act 1962	10 & 11 Eliz. 2. c. 43	19 July 1962
An Act to give effect to the Convention, supplementary to the Warsaw Convention, for the unification of certain rules relating to international carriage by air performed by a person other than the contracting carrier; and for connected purposes.
Finance Act 1962	10 & 11 Eliz. 2. c. 44	1 August 1962
An Act to grant certain duties, to alter other duties, and to amend the law relating to the National Debt and the Public Revenue, and to make further provision in connection with Finance.
Appropriation Act 1962	10 & 11 Eliz. 2. c. 45	1 August 1962
An Act to apply a sum out of the Consolidated Fund to the service of the year ending on the thirty-first day of March, one thousand nine hundred and sixty-three, and to appropriate the supplies granted in this Session of Parliament.
Transport Act 1962	10 & 11 Eliz. 2. c. 46	1 August 1962
An Act to provide for the re-organisation of the nationalised transport undertakings now carried on under the Transport Act, 1947, and for that purpose to provide for the establishment of public authorities as successors to the British Transport Commission, and for the transfer to them of undertakings, parts of undertakings, property, rights, obligations and liabilities; to repeal certain enactments relating to transport charges and facilities and to amend in other respects the law relating to transport, inland waterways, harbours and port facilities; and for purposes connected with the matters aforesaid.
Education (Scotland) Act 1962	10 & 11 Eliz. 2. c. 47	1 August 1962
An Act to consolidate the enactments relating to education in Scotland.
Law Reform (Husband and Wife) Act 1962	10 & 11 Eliz. 2. c. 48	1 August 1962
An Act to amend the law with respect to civil proceedings between husband and wife.
Air Guns and Shot Guns, etc., Act 1962 (repealed)	10 & 11 Eliz. 2. c. 49	1 August 1962
An Act to restrict the use and possession of air guns, shot guns and similar weapons. (Repealed by Firearms Act 1968 (c. 27))
Landlord and Tenant Act 1962	10 & 11 Eliz. 2. c. 50	1 August 1962
An Act to require the giving of information by landlords to tenants; and for purposes connected therewith.
Licensing (Scotland) Act 1962	10 & 11 Eliz. 2. c. 51	1 August 1962
An Act to make provision in Scotland for the grant by licensing courts of new forms of certificate for the sale by retail of exciseable liquor; to amend the law in Scotland regarding the sale and supply of exciseable liquor and regarding licensed premises and clubs; to prescribe the hours during which premises in Scotland licensed for the sale and supply of exciseable liquor for consumption off the premises may remain open for the serving of customers with such liquor; to restrict the carriage of exciseable liquor on public service vehicles used as contract carriages; and for purposes connected with the matters aforesaid.
Penalties for Drunkenness Act 1962	10 & 11 Eliz. 2. c. 52	1 August 1962
An Act to increase the penalties for certain offences involving drunkenness or punishable under enactments relating to such offences.
House of Commons Members' Fund Act 1962 (repealed)	10 & 11 Eliz. 2. c. 53	1 August 1962
An Act to make fresh provision with respect to the powers of investment of the trustees of the House of Commons Members' Fund. (Repealed by House of Commons Members' Fund Act 2016 (c. 18))
Trinidad and Tobago Independence Act 1962	10 & 11 Eliz. 2. c. 54	1 August 1962
An Act to make provision for, and in connection with, the attainment by Trinidad and Tobago of fully responsible status within the Commonwealth.
Lotteries and Gaming Act 1962 (repealed)	10 & 11 Eliz. 2. c. 55	1 August 1962
An Act to make provision with respect to the interpretation of references to private gain in certain enactments relating to lotteries or gaming, and to exclude the operation of paragraph (b) of subsection (1) of section sixteen of the Betting and Gaming Act, 1960, in relation to gaming to which section twenty of that Act applies. (Repealed by Betting, Gaming and Lotteries Act 1963 (c. 2))
Local Government (Records) Act 1962	10 & 11 Eliz. 2. c. 56	1 August 1962
An Act to amend the law relating to the functions of local authorities with respect to records in written or other form.
Uganda Independence Act 1962	10 & 11 Eliz. 2. c. 57	1 August 1962
An Act to make provision for, and in connection with, the attainment by Uganda of fully responsible status within the Commonwealth.
Pipe-lines Act 1962	10 & 11 Eliz. 2. c. 58	1 August 1962
An Act to regulate and facilitate the construction, and secure the safe operation, of pipe-lines and make provision for matters arising thereout; and to provide that certain pipe-lines shall be plant or machinery for the purposes of the enactments relating to rating in England and Wales.
Road Traffic Act 1962	10 & 11 Eliz. 2. c. 59	1 August 1962
An Act to make further provision as to road safety and road traffic and for purposes connected therewith.

== Local Acts ==
Short title	Citation	Royal assent
Long title
Glasgow Corporation (Parking Meters) Order Confirmation Act 1961	10 & 11 Eliz. 2. c. i	20 December 1961
An Act to confirm a Provisional Order under the Private Legislation Procedure (Scotland) Act, 1936, relating to Glasgow Corporation (Parking Meters).
	Glasgow Corporation (Parking Meters) Order 1961 Provisional Order to make provision as to the installation by the Corporation of the city of Glasgow of parking meters on the footpaths of public streets in the said city and for purposes connected therewith.	
Edinburgh Corporation Order Confirmation Act 1961	10 & 11 Eliz. 2. c. ii	20 December 1961
An Act to confirm a Provisional Order under the Private Legislation Procedure (Scotland) Act, 1936, relating to the Edinburgh Corporation.
	Edinburgh Corporation Order 1961 Provisional Order to consolidate with amendments the Acts and Orders of or relating to the Corporation of the city of Edinburgh with respect to public libraries, museums and art galleries, Lauriston Castle, markets and slaughterhouses, lighting, cleansing, public health and sanitation, the seashore, licensing, the burgh court of the said city, the disposal of lost and stolen property, offences and penalties and general police powers, and to confer further powers on the Corporation with respect to the foregoing matters and with respect to the water undertaking of the Corporation, and to make further provision for the local government, health and improvement of the city and for other purposes.	
Rothesay Burgh Order Confirmation Act 1961	10 & 11 Eliz. 2. c. iii	20 December 1961
An Act to confirm a Provisional Order under the Private Legislation Procedure (Scotland) Act, 1936, relating to Rothesay Burgh.
	Rothesay Burgh Order 1961 Provisional Order to confer powers on the provost magistrates and councillors of the royal burgh of Rothesay with respect to parks and the local government, health and administration of the burgh, to authorise the said provost magistrates and councillors to borrow money, and for other purposes.	
Argyll County Council (Scalasaig Pier, etc.) Order Confirmation Act 1961	10 & 11 Eliz. 2. c. iv	20 December 1961
An Act to confirm a Provisional Order under the Private Legislation Procedure (Scotland) Act, 1936, relating to Argyll County Council (Scalasaig Pier, etc.).
	Argyll County Council (Scalasaig Pier, etc.) Order 1961 Provisional Order to authorise the County Council of the county of Argyll to construct a new pierhead and approach gantry or bridge thereto at Scalasaig in the parish of Colonsay and Oronsay in the Island of Colonsay and to confer further powers on the said County Council with respect to the pier undertaking at Scalasaig and for other purposes.	
Largs Burgh Order Confirmation Act 1962	10 & 11 Eliz. 2. c. v	15 March 1962
An Act to confirm a Provisional Order under the Private Legislation Procedure (Scotland) Act, 1936, relating to Largs Burgh.
	Largs Burgh Order 1962 Provisional Order to confer powers on the provost magistrates and councillors of the burgh of Largs with respect to the local government, health and administration of the burgh, to authorise the said provost magistrates and councillors to borrow money, and for other purposes.	
Zinc Corporation Act 1962	10 & 11 Eliz. 2. c. vi	18 April 1962
An Act to make provision for the transfer to the State of Victoria in the Commonwealth of Australia of the registered office of The Zinc Corporation, Limited for the purpose of enabling that company to be deemed to be incorporated in such State, for the cesser of application to that company of provisions of the Companies Act, 1948, consequent thereon; and for other purposes incidental thereto.
Royal Holloway College Act 1962	10 & 11 Eliz. 2. c. vii	18 April 1962
An Act to amend the Royal Holloway College Act 1949; and for other purposes.
Australian Agricultural Company Act 1962	10 & 11 Eliz. 2. c. viii	18 April 1962
An Act to amend enactments relating to the Australian Agricultural Company, and for other purposes.
Whitehaven Harbour Act 1962	10 & 11 Eliz. 2. c. ix	18 April 1962
An Act to make provision in relation to the application of the revenue of the Whitehaven Harbour Commissioners and the payment of interest on bonds of the Commissioners; to authorise the creation of a reserve fund; and for other purposes.
Saint Paul, Covent Garden, Act 1962	10 & 11 Eliz. 2. c. x	18 April 1962
An Act to amend the law relating to the rate leviable by the churchwardens of the parish of Saint Paul, Covent Garden, in regard to the incidence thereof, and to make provision for the redemption and extinguishment of the said rate, and for matters incidental to or consequential upon the aforesaid purposes.
Royal Russell School Act 1962	10 & 11 Eliz. 2. c. xi	18 April 1962
An Act to change the name of the Royal Warehousemen Clerks and Drapers' Schools, and for other purposes.
Kent Quarter Sessions Act 1962	10 & 11 Eliz. 2. c. xii	24 May 1962
An Act to make provision in relation to the office of chairman of the court of quarter sessions for the county of Kent.
Wallasey Corporation Act 1962	10 & 11 Eliz. 2. c. xiii	24 May 1962
An Act to transfer the undertaking of the Wallasey Embankment Commissioners to the mayor, aldermen and burgesses of the borough of Wallasey; and for other purposes.
Liverpool Corporation Act 1962	10 & 11 Eliz. 2. c. xiv	24 May 1962
An Act to confer further powers on the lord mayor, aldermen and citizens of the city of Liverpool in connection with their water undertaking, to make further provision with regard to the finances of the city; and for other purposes.
University of Keele Act 1962	10 & 11 Eliz. 2. c. xv	24 May 1962
An Act to dissolve the University College of North Staffordshire and to transfer all the property and liabilities of that college to the University of Keele; and for other purposes.
Independent Chapel Mawdsley Street Bolton Act 1962	10 & 11 Eliz. 2. c. xvi	24 May 1962
An Act to authorise the sale of the burial ground comprised in the Independent Chapel at Mawdsley Street in the borough of Bolton, to authorise the erection of buildings thereon; and for other purposes.
Assay Offices Act 1962	10 & 11 Eliz. 2. c. xvii	24 May 1962
An Act to provide for the closing of the Chester Assay Office and the dissolution of the Company of Goldsmiths of the City of Chester and to make provisions consequent thereon; and for other purposes.
University of Sussex Act 1962	10 & 11 Eliz. 2. c. xviii	24 May 1962
An Act to dissolve the University College of Sussex and to transfer all the rights, property and liabilities of that college to the University of Sussex; and for other purposes.
Melville Trust Order Confirmation Act 1962	10 & 11 Eliz. 2. c. xix	3 July 1962
An Act to confirm a Provisional Order under the Private Legislation Procedure (Scotland) Act, 1936, relating to the Melville Trust.
	Melville Trust Order 1962 Provisional Order to confer powers on The Melville Estate Trustees with respect to the acceptance of legacies, gifts and transfers of property and to enable them to enter into agreements and arrangements with other bodies and for purposes connected therewith.	
Saint Thomas Apostle (Queen Street) Churchyard Act 1962	10 & 11 Eliz. 2. c. xx	3 July 1962
An Act to authorise the sale of the churchyard appurtenant to the former church of Saint Thomas Apostle in the city of London, to authorise the erection of buildings thereon; and for other purposes.
Saint Peter's Church, Nottingham, Churchyard Act 1962	10 & 11 Eliz. 2. c. xxi	3 July 1962
An Act to authorise the setting aside of the western part of the churchyard of the parish church of the united parish of Saint Peter with Saint James in the city of Nottingham at street level for street improvements, to authorise the sale or leasing of the southern part of the said churchyard and its use for building or otherwise, to authorise the demolition of the vestry at the north-east corner of the said church and the erection on the site thereof and on adjoining parts of the said churchyard of a building for use as a vestry, parish hall and centre for religious instruction, to authorise the erection of a bookshop on part of the said churchyard to the north of the said church; and for other purposes.
Shoreham Harbour Act 1962	10 & 11 Eliz. 2. c. xxii	3 July 1962
An Act to confer further powers upon the Shoreham Harbour Trustees; and for other purposes.
Ministry of Housing and Local Government Provisional Order Confirmation (Brighouse) Act 1962	10 & 11 Eliz. 2. c. xxiii	19 July 1962
An Act to confirm a Provisional Order of the Minister of Housing and Local Government relating to the borough of Brighouse.
	Brighouse Order 1962 Provisional Order partially repealing a Local Act.	
Ministry of Housing and Local Government Provisional Order Confirmation (Doncaster) Act 1962	10 & 11 Eliz. 2. c. xxiv	19 July 1962
An Act to confirm a Provisional Order of the Minister of Housing and Local Government relating to the county borough of Doncaster.
	Doncaster Order 1962 Provisional Order altering a Local Act.	
Ministry of Housing and Local Government Provisional Order Confirmation (Sidmouth) Act 1962	10 & 11 Eliz. 2. c. xxv	19 July 1962
An Act to confirm a Provisional Order of the Minister of Housing and Local Government relating to the urban district Sidmouth.
	Sidmouth Order 1962 Provisional Order amending a Local Act.	
Grimsby Corporation Act 1962	10 & 11 Eliz. 2. c. xxvi	19 July 1962
An Act to confer further powers on the mayor, aldermen and burgesses of the county borough of Grimsby in relation to streets and the local government, health, improvement and finances of the borough; and for other purposes.
South Essex Waterworks Act 1962	10 & 11 Eliz. 2. c. xxvii	19 July 1962
An Act to authorise the South Essex Waterworks Company to construct works and to acquire lands, to confer powers upon the Company; and for other purposes.
Ship Mortgage Finance Company Act 1962	10 & 11 Eliz. 2. c. xxviii	19 July 1962
An Act to exempt Ship Mortgage Finance Company Limited from the provisions of the Moneylenders Acts, 1900 to 1927, as from the incorporation of the Company until the thirtieth day of January, 1962; and for other purposes.
London County Council (Money) Act 1962	10 & 11 Eliz. 2. c. xxix	19 July 1962
An Act to regulate the expenditure on capital account and lending of money by the London County Council during the financial period from the first day of April, nineteen hundred and sixty-two, to the thirtieth day of September, nineteen hundred and sixty-three; and for other purposes.
Manchester Corporation Act 1962	10 & 11 Eliz. 2. c. xxx	19 July 1962
An Act to authorise the lord mayor, aldermen and citizens of the city of Manchester to construct river works and to acquire lands; to make provision with regard to lands and the health, local government and finances of the said city; to provide for the removal of restrictions attaching to the churchyard of the former church of Saint James situate in George Street in the city, and to authorise the sale of the said churchyard; and for other purposes.
Runcorn District Water Board Act 1962	10 & 11 Eliz. 2. c. xxxi	19 July 1962
An Act to empower the Runcorn District Water Board to construct works and to acquire lands; and for other purposes.
Glasgow Corporation Order Confirmation Act 1962	10 & 11 Eliz. 2. c. xxxii	1 August 1962
An Act to confirm a Provisional Order under the Private Legislation Procedure (Scotland) Act, 1936, relating to Glasgow Corporation.
	Glasgow Corporation Order 1962 Provisional Order to extend the powers of the Corporation of the city of Glasgow with respect to the investment of their superannuation fund; to amend certain of the provisions of the Glasgow Corporation Consolidation (General Powers) Order, 1960 relating to public health and other matters; to make provision as to the deduction from rates to which the Trustees of the Clyde Navigation are to be entitled in respect of the cleansing and lighting by them of their quays and certain other works; to make further provision as to the powers of the Trustees of the Ure Elder Fund for Indigent Widow Ladies and for other purposes.	
Tay Road Bridge Order Confirmation Act 1962	10 & 11 Eliz. 2. c. xxxiii	1 August 1962
An Act to confirm a Provisional Order under the Private Legislation Procedure (Scotland) Act, 1936, relating to Tay Road Bridge.
	Tay Road Bridge Order 1962 Provisional Order to provide for the construction and maintenance of a road bridge across the Firth of Tay from the City of Dundee to the County of Fife, with approach roads in connection therewith, to establish a Joint Board for that purpose, to make provision as to the abandonment of the existing ferry of the Trustees of the Harbour of Dundee between Dundee and Newport-on-Tay and for other purposes.	
Leith Harbour and Docks Order Confirmation Act 1962 (repealed)	10 & 11 Eliz. 2. c. xxxiv	1 August 1962
An Act to confirm a Provisional Order under the Private Legislation Procedure (Scotland) Act, 1936, relating to Leith Harbour and Docks. (Repealed by Statute Law (Repeals) Act 1986 (c. 12))
	Leith Harbour and Docks Order 1962 Provisional Order to authorise the Commissioners for the harbour and docks of Leith to construct works, to amend the provisions of the Leith Harbour and Docks Orders, 1935 to 1959, to confer further powers on the Commissioners and for other purposes.	
Maidstone Corporation (Trolley Vehicles) Order Confirmation Act 1962	10 & 11 Eliz. 2. c. xxxv	1 August 1962
An Act to confirm a Provisional Order made by the Minister of Transport under the Maidstone Corporation Act, 1923, relating to Maidstone Corporation trolley vehicles.
	Maidstone Corporation (Trolley Vehicles) Order 1962 Provisional Order authorising the mayor aldermen and burgesses of the borough of Maidstone to maintain and use trolley vehicles upon additional routes in the borough of Maidstone.	
Pier and Harbour Order (Great Yarmouth New Britannia Pier) Confirmation Act 1962	10 & 11 Eliz. 2. c. xxxvi	1 August 1962
An Act to confirm a Provisional Order made by the Minister of Transport under the General Pier and Harbour Act, 1861, relating to Great Yarmouth New Britannia Pier.
	Great Yarmouth New Britannia Pier Order 1962 Provisional Order to amend the enactments relating to the Great Yarmouth New Britannia Pier Company and for other purposes.	
Pier and Harbour Order (Great Yarmouth Port and Haven) Confirmation Act 1962	10 & 11 Eliz. 2. c. xxxvii	1 August 1962
An Act to confirm a Provisional Order made by the Minister of Transport under the General Pier and Harbour Act, 1861, relating to Great Yarmouth Port and Haven.
	Great Yarmouth Port and Haven Order 1962 Provisional Order to authorise the Great Yarmouth Port and Haven Commissioners to borrow further moneys; and for other purposes.	
Pier and Harbour Order (Langstone Harbour) Confirmation Act 1962	10 & 11 Eliz. 2. c. xxxviii	1 August 1962
An Act to confirm a Provisional Order made by the Minister of Transport under the General Pier and Harbour Act, 1861, relating to Langstone Harbour.
	Langstone Harbour Order 1962 Provisional Order to provide for the constitution of a Joint Board of the Portsmouth and Havant and Waterloo Councils for the administration of Langstone Harbour; to confer powers on the Joint Board with reference thereto and the improvement thereof; and for other purposes.	
Letchworth Garden City Corporation Act 1962	10 & 11 Eliz. 2. c. xxxix	1 August 1962
An Act to constitute the Letchworth Garden City Corporation, to transfer to that Corporation the undertaking of First Garden City Limited, to confer powers upon the Corporation; and for other purposes.
Dartford Tunnel Act 1962	10 & 11 Eliz. 2. c. xl	1 August 1962
An Act to authorise the construction of new or altered works and the acquisition of land for the purposes of or in connection with works authorised by the Dartford Tunnel Act, 1957, to authorise the abandonment of certain authorised works, to amend the Dartford Tunnel Acts, 1930 to 1961; and for other purposes.
Orpington Urban District Council Act 1962	10 & 11 Eliz. 2. c. xli	1 August 1962
An Act to confer further powers on the urban district council of Orpington in regard to private streets; to make further and better provision for the health, local government, finance and improvement of the urban district of the said Council; and for other purposes.
British Transport Commission Act 1962	10 & 11 Eliz. 2. c. xlii	1 August 1962
An Act to empower the British Transport Commission to construct works and to acquire lands, to authorise the closing to navigation of portions of certain waterways, to extend the time for the compulsory purchase of certain lands and the completion of certain works, to confer further powers on the Commission; and for other purposes.
City of London (Various Powers) Act 1962	10 & 11 Eliz. 2. c. xliii	1 August 1962
An Act to confer further powers upon the Corporation of London, and for other purposes.
Regent Refining Company Act 1962	10 & 11 Eliz. 2. c. xliv	1 August 1962
An Act to empower Regent Refining Company Limited to construct works and to acquire lands; and for other purposes.
London County Council (General Powers) Act 1962	10 & 11 Eliz. 2. c. xlv	1 August 1962
An Act to confer further powers upon the London County Council and other authorities; and for other purposes.
River Dart Navigation Act 1962	10 & 11 Eliz. 2. c. xlvi	1 August 1962
An Act to amend the constitution of the River Dart Navigation Commissioners, to make provision with respect to the rates, rents and charges leviable by the Commissioners, to confer upon the Commissioners additional powers, to amend the statutory powers of the Commissioners; and for other purposes.
South Staffordshire Water Act 1962	10 & 11 Eliz. 2. c. xlvii	1 August 1962
An Act to authorise the South Staffordshire Waterworks Company to acquire lands; and for other purposes.
Scotswood Bridge Act 1962	10 & 11 Eliz. 2. c. xlviii	1 August 1962
An Act to empower the county council of the administrative county of Durham and the lord mayor, aldermen and citizens of the city and county of Newcastle upon Tyne to construct a bridge across the river Tyne with approach roads and other works and to purchase lands compulsorily for those and other purposes, to provide for the removal of the existing Scotswood Bridge across the river Tyne; and for other purposes.
London County Council (Improvements) Act 1962	10 & 11 Eliz. 2. c. xlix	1 August 1962
An Act to empower the London County Council to execute street and other works and to acquire lands, to confer further powers on the London County Council and another authority; and for other purposes.
London Bridge Improvements Act 1962	10 & 11 Eliz. 2. c. l	1 August 1962
An Act to empower the Corporation of London to widen London Bridge and to construct other works, to acquire lands compulsorily; and for other purposes.
Port of London Act 1962	10 & 11 Eliz. 2. c. li	1 August 1962
An Act to confer further powers on the Port of London Authority; and for other purposes.
Northampton Corporation Act 1962	10 & 11 Eliz. 2. c. lii	1 August 1962
An Act to authorise the mayor, aldermen and burgesses of the county borough of Northampton to acquire and maintain the Billing Road Cemetery in the borough, to confer further powers on the said mayor, aldermen and burgesses in regard to cemeteries and burial grounds maintainable by them; and for other purposes.
Manchester Ship Canal Act 1962	10 & 11 Eliz. 2. c. liii	1 August 1962
An Act to increase certain dues, tolls, rates and charges leviable by the Manchester Ship Canal Company, to confer further powers upon the Company; and for other purposes.
