= List of acts of the Parliament of the United Kingdom from 1983 =

This is a list of acts of the Parliament of the United Kingdom passed in 1983.

Acts passed since 1963 are cited by calendar year, as opposed to the convention used for earlier acts of citing the regnal year(s) in which the relevant parliamentary session was held. Each act passed in a respective year is given a chapter number (abbreviated "c."), denoted by Arabic numerals in the case of public general acts, lowercase Roman numerals in the case of local acts, or italicised Arabic numerals in the case of personal acts. These run as separate series.

79 acts of Parliament were passed in 1983: 60 public general acts and 19 local acts.

indicates that an act has been transcribed on Wikisource, indicates that an act is available to view at legislation.gov.uk, and indicates the location of the original act in the Parliamentary Archives.

== Public general acts ==
Short title	Citation	Royal assent
Long title
Consolidated Fund Act 1983	1983 c. 1	8 February 1983
An Act to apply certain sums out of the Consolidated Fund to the service of the years ending on 31st March 1983 and 1984.
Representation of the People Act 1983	1983 c. 2	8 February 1983
An Act to consolidate the Representation of the People Acts of 1949, (Note: Representation of the People Act 1949 (12, 13 & 14 Geo. 6. c. 68)) 1969, (Note: Representation of the People Act 1969 (c. 15)) 1977, (Note: Representation of the People Act 1977 (c. 9)) 1978 (Note: Representation of the People Act 1978 (c. 32)) and 1980, (Note: Representation of the People Act 1980 (c. 3)) the Electoral Registers Acts of 1949 (Note: Electoral Registers Act 1949 (12, 13 & 14 Geo. 6. c. 86)) and 1953, (Note: Electoral Registers Act 1953 (2 & 3 Eliz. 2. c. 8)) the Elections (Welsh Forms) Act 1964, (Note: Elections (Welsh Forms) Act 1964 (c. 31)) Part III of the Local Government Act 1972, (Note: Local Government Act 1972 (c. 70)) sections 6 to 10 of the Local Government (Scotland) Act 1973, (Note: Local Government (Scotland) Act 1973 (c. 65)) the Representation of the People (Armed Forces) Act 1976, (Note: Representation of the People (Armed Forces) Act 1976 (c. 29)) the Returning Officers (Scotland) Act 1977, (Note: Returning Officers (Scotland) Act 1977 (c. 14)) section 3 of the Representation of the People Act 1981, (Note: Representation of the People Act 1981 (c. 34)) section 62 of and Schedule 2 to the Mental Health (Amendment) Act 1982, (Note: Mental Health (Amendment) Act 1982 (c. 51)) and connected provisions; and to repeal as obsolete the Representation of the People Act 1979 (Note: Representation of the People Act 1979 (c. 40)) and other enactments related to the Representation of the People Acts.
Agricultural Marketing Act 1983 (repealed)	1983 c. 3	1 March 1983
An Act to establish a body corporate to be known as Food from Britain to improve the marketing of food produced or processed in the United Kingdom and of other agricultural produce of the United Kingdom; to transfer to Food from Britain the functions of the Central Council for Agricultural and Horticultural Co-operation and to dissolve the Central Council; to enable certain other marketing organisations to make contributions to Food from Britain; and to repeal section 61(9) of the Agriculture Act 1967. (Repealed by Public Bodies (Abolition of Food from Britain) Order 2014 (SI 2014/1924))
Pig Industry Levy Act 1983	1983 c. 4	1 March 1983
An Act to authorise the Meat and Livestock Commission to impose a levy for the purpose of meeting costs incurred by the Minister of Agriculture, Fisheries and Food in consequence of exercising any of his powers under the Animal Health Act 1981 (Note: Animal Health Act 1981 (c. 22)) in relation to the disease of pigs known as Aujeszky's disease or in relation to pigs which are affected or suspected of being affected with, or have been exposed to the infection of, that disease and for the purpose of making certain additional compensation payments to the owners of such pigs in respect of losses incurred by them in consequence of action taken by the Minister in relation to those pigs under that Act; and to provide for the application of the proceeds of the levy for those and connected purposes and otherwise for the benefit of the pig industry or the pig products industry.
Consolidated Fund (No. 2) Act 1983	1983 c. 5	28 March 1983
An Act to apply certain sums out of the Consolidated Fund to the service of the years ending on 31st March 1982 and 1983.
British Nationality (Falkland Islands) Act 1983	1983 c. 6	28 March 1983
An Act to provide for the acquisition of British citizenship by persons having connections with the Falkland Islands.
Conwy Tunnel (Supplementary Powers) Act 1983	1983 c. 7	28 March 1983
An Act to authorise the Secretary of State to acquire certain land and construct and carry out certain works, and to confer on him certain other powers, for or in connection with the construction, maintenance and improvement of a tunnel which he is authorised under the Highways Act 1980 (Note: Highways Act 1980 (c. 66)) to construct across the Conwy Estuary as part of a special road; and for connected purposes.
British Fishing Boats Act 1983	1983 c. 8	28 March 1983
An Act to prohibit the fishing for and trans-shipment of sea fish by or from British fishing boats, in areas specified by order made by the Minister of Agriculture, Fisheries and Food and the Secretaries of State respectively concerned with the sea fishing industry in Scotland, Wales and Northern Ireland, unless those boats satisfy conditions prescribed by an order of those Ministers with respect to the nationality of members of the crew; and to prohibit the landing of sea fish in the United Kingdom from British fishing boats that do not satisfy conditions so prescribed.
Currency Act 1983	1983 c. 9	28 March 1983
An Act to amend the Coinage Act 1971 (Note: Coinage Act 1971 (c. 24)) and the law relating to issuing and writing off bank notes.
Transport Act 1983	1983 c. 10	28 March 1983
An Act to make further provision with respect to the finances and management of certain Transport Executives; and to reduce the indebtedness of the National Dock Labour Board in respect of money borrowed from the Secretary of State for financing severance payments to registered dock workers.
Civil Aviation (Eurocontrol) Act 1983	1983 c. 11	11 April 1983
An Act to make further provision with respect to the European Organisation for the Safety of Air Navigation known as Eurocontrol and to amend section 73(4) of the Civil Aviation Act 1982. (Note: Civil Aviation Act 1982 (c. 16))
Divorce Jurisdiction, Court Fees and Legal Aid (Scotland) Act 1983	1983 c. 12	11 April 1983
An Act to extend the jurisdiction of sheriffs in Scotland in relation to actions for divorce; to make provision as regards the sufficiency of evidence in certain actions for divorce in Scotland; to make new provision in Scotland as to the fees and outlays of counsel and solicitors in relation both to legal aid, and to the giving of legal advice and assistance under the Legal Advice and Assistance Act 1972; (Note: Legal Advice and Assistance Act 1972 (c. 50)) to make new provision in relation to the regulation of fees payable in the Scottish courts; and for connected purposes.
Merchant Shipping Act 1983	1983 c. 13	11 April 1983
An Act to make further provision in respect of the registration of small ships and the appointment of registrars at ports.
International Transport Conventions Act 1983	1983 c. 14	11 April 1983
An Act to give effect to the Convention concerning International Carriage by Rail signed on behalf of the United Kingdom on 9th May 1980; and to make further provision for the amendment of Acts giving effect to other international transport conventions so as to take account of revisions of the conventions to which they give effect.
British Shipbuilders Act 1983 (repealed)	1983 c. 15	9 May 1983
An Act to make further provision with respect to the functions and activities of British Shipbuilders. (Repealed by Public Bodies (Abolition of British Shipbuilders) Order 2013 (SI 2013/687))
Level Crossings Act 1983	1983 c. 16	9 May 1983
An Act to make further provision about level crossings.
Plant Varieties Act 1983 (repealed)	1983 c. 17	9 May 1983
An Act to amend the Plant Varieties and Seeds Act 1964. (Note: Plant Varieties and Seeds Act 1964 (c. 14)) (Repealed by Plant Varieties Act 1997 (c. 66))
Nuclear Material (Offences) Act 1983	1983 c. 18	9 May 1983
An Act to implement the Convention on the Physical Protection of Nuclear Material; and for purposes connected therewith.
Matrimonial Homes Act 1983 (repealed)	1983 c. 19	9 May 1983
An Act to consolidate certain enactments relating to the rights of a husband or wife to occupy a dwelling house that has been a matrimonial home. (Repealed by Family Law Act 1996 (c. 27))
Mental Health Act 1983	1983 c. 20	9 May 1983
An Act to consolidate the law relating to mentally disordered persons.
Pilotage Act 1983 (repealed)	1983 c. 21	9 May 1983
An Act to consolidate the Pilotage Acts 1913 (Note: Pilotage Act 1913 (2 & 3 Geo. 5. c. 31)) and 1936 (Note: Pilotage Authorities (Limitation of Liability) Act 1936 (26 Geo. 5 & 1 Edw. 8. c. 36)) and certain provisions of the Merchant Shipping Act 1979. (Note: Merchant Shipping Act 1979 (c. 39)) (Repealed by Pilotage Act 1987 (c. 21))
Ports (Reduction of Debt) Act 1983	1983 c. 22	9 May 1983
An Act to make provision for reducing the indebtedness of the Port of London Authority and the Mersey Docks and Harbour Company.
Water Act 1983	1983 c. 23	9 May 1983
An Act to make provision as to the constitution and procedure of water authorities and their borrowing and other powers and as to arrangements for the carrying out of their sewerage functions; to enable water authorities and statutory water companies to provide advice and assistance outside the United Kingdom; to provide for the dissolution of the National Water Council and the Water Space Amenity Commission; and to repeal the Water Charges Equalisation Act 1977; (Note: Water Charges Equalisation Act 1977 (c. 41)) and for connected purposes.
Licensing (Occasional Permissions) Act 1983 (repealed)	1983 c. 24	9 May 1983
An Act to empower licensing justices in England and Wales to grant to representatives of organisations not carried on for private gain occasional permissions authorising the sale of intoxicating liquor at functions connected with the activities of such organisations. (Repealed by Licensing Act 2003 (c. 17))
Energy Act 1983	1983 c. 25	9 May 1983
An Act to amend the law relating to electricity so as to facilitate the generation and supply of electricity by persons other than Electricity Boards, and for certain other purposes; and to amend the law relating to the duties of persons responsible for nuclear installations and to compensation for breach of those duties.
Pet Animals Act 1951 (Amendment) Act 1983 or the Pet Animals Act 1951 (Amendment) Act 1982 (Note: Although passed in 1983, and despite the heading to the Queen's Printer edition stating that the act is the Pet Animals Act 1951 (Amendment) Act 1983 (which is how the act is invariably cited), the section granting the short title in the act itself deems that the act is the "Pet Animals Act 1951 (Amendment) Act 1982".)	1983 c. 26	9 May 1983
An Act to amend the Pet Animals Act 1951 (Note: Pet Animals Act 1951 (14 & 15 Geo. 6. c. 35)) regulating the sale of pet animals.
Appropriation Act 1983	1983 c. 27	13 May 1983
An Act to apply a sum out of the Consolidated Fund to the service of the year ending on 31st March 1984, to appropriate the supplies granted in this Session of Parliament, and to repeal certain Consolidated Fund and Appropriation Acts.
Finance Act 1983	1983 c. 28	13 May 1983
An Act to grant certain duties, to alter other duties, and to amend the law relating to the National Debt and the Public Revenue, and to make further provision in connection with Finance.
Miscellaneous Financial Provisions Act 1983	1983 c. 29	13 May 1983
An Act to establish a Development Commission in place of the Commissioners appointed under the Development and Road Improvement Funds Act 1909; (Note: Development and Road Improvement Funds Act 1909 (9 Edw. 7. c. 47)) to authorise the making of grants by the Secretary of State to bodies promoting industrial or commercial development in areas in England; to extinguish liability in respect of certain guarantees given under the Colonial Loans Act 1949; (Note: Colonial Loans Act 1949 (12, 13 & 14 Geo. 6. c. 50)) to amend certain enactments authorising the Treasury to give guarantees; to extend the power of the Crown Estate Commissioners to grant leases; to make provision for the redemption of certain annuities and allowances which have been payable out of public funds since before 1874; to amend section 173A of the Local Government Act 1972; and for connected purposes.
Diseases of Fish Act 1983 (repealed)	1983 c. 30	13 May 1983
An Act to make further provision for preventing the spread of disease among fish, including shellfish and fish bred or reared in the course of fish farming. (Repealed by Aquatic Animal Health (England and Wales) Regulations 2009 (SI 2009/463) and Aquatic Animal Health (Scotland) Regulations 2009 (SSI 2009/85))
Coroners' Juries Act 1983 (repealed)	1983 c. 31	13 May 1983
An Act to make fresh provision with respect to the qualifications of persons eligible to serve on coroners' juries; to provide criminal penalties for evasion of service on a coroner's jury; to amend section 26 of the Coroners (Amendment) Act 1926; (Note: Coroners (Amendment) Act 1926 (16 & 17 Geo. 5. c. 59)) and for connected purposes. (Repealed by Coroners Act 1988 (c. 13))
Marriage Act 1983	1983 c. 32	13 May 1983
An Act to enable marriages of house-bound and detained persons to be solemnized at the place where they reside; and for connected purposes.
Solvent Abuse (Scotland) Act 1983 (repealed)	1983 c. 33	13 May 1983
An Act to amend the Social Work (Scotland) Act 1968 (Note: Social Work (Scotland) Act 1968 (c. 49)) to add solvent abuse to the conditions indicating the need for compulsory measures of care. (Repealed by Children (Scotland) Act 1995 (c. 36))
Mobile Homes Act 1983	1983 c. 34	13 May 1983
An Act to make new provision in place of sections 1 to 6 of the Mobile Homes Act 1975. (Note: Mobile Homes Act 1975 (c. 49))
Litter Act 1983	1983 c. 35	13 May 1983
An Act to consolidate the Litter Acts 1958 (Note: Litter Act 1958 (6 & 7 Eliz. 2. c. 34)) and 1971, (Note: Dangerous Litter Act 1971 (c. 35)) together with section 51 of the Public Health Act 1961, (Note: Public Health Act 1961 (9 & 10 Eliz. 2. c. 64)) section 4 of the Local Government (Development and Finance) (Scotland) Act 1964 (Note: Local Government (Development and Finance) (Scotland) Act 1964 (c. 67)) and section 24 of the Control of Pollution Act 1974 (Note: Control of Pollution Act 1974 (c. 40)) and related provisions of those Acts.
Social Security and Housing Benefits Act 1983	1983 c. 36	13 May 1983
An Act to make provision for the calculation on an historic basis of certain increases in the sums specified in sections 125 and 126A of the Social Security Act 1975 (Note: Social Security Act 1975 (c. 14)) and in the needs allowances under section 29 of the Social Security and Housing Benefits Act 1982. (Note: Social Security and Housing Benefits Act 1982 (c. 24))
Importation of Milk Act 1983 (repealed)	1983 c. 37	13 May 1983
An Act to make provision as to the importation of milk and as to imported milk and milk brought to Northern Ireland from Great Britain. (Repealed for England and Wales and Scotland by Food Safety Act 1990 (c. 16) and for Northern Ireland by Food Safety (Northern Ireland) Order 1991 (SI 1991/762))
Dentists Act 1983 (repealed)	1983 c. 38	13 May 1983
An Act to amend the Dentists Act 1957 (Note: Dentists Act 1957 (5 & 6 Eliz. 2. c. 28)) and for connected purposes. (Repealed by Dentists Act 1984 (c. 24))
Mental Health (Amendment) (Scotland) Act 1983 (repealed)	1983 c. 39	13 May 1983
An Act to amend the Mental Health (Scotland) Act 1960; (Note: Mental Health (Scotland) Act 1960 (8 & 9 Eliz. 2. c. 61)) and for connected purposes. (Repealed by Mental Health (Scotland) Act 1984 (c. 36))
Education (Fees and Awards) Act 1983	1983 c. 40	13 May 1983
An Act to make provision with respect to the fees charged by universities and other institutions to students not having the requisite connection with the United Kingdom, the Channel Islands or the Isle of Man and the exclusion of such students from eligibility for certain discretionary awards.
Health and Social Services and Social Security Adjudications Act 1983	1983 c. 41	13 May 1983
An Act to amend the law relating to the financing of certain social services in England and Wales and Scotland and to children and young persons; to make fresh provision for the Central Council for Education and Training in Social Work and further provision for the remuneration and conditions of service of medical and dental practitioners in the National Health Service and health service officers; to amend the law relating to homes regulated by the Nursing Homes Act 1975, (Note: Nursing Homes Act 1975 (c. 37)) the Child Care Act 1980, (Note: Child Care Act 1980 (c. 5)) the Residential Homes Act 1980 (Note: Residential Homes Act 1980 (c. 7)) and the Children's Homes Act 1982; (Note: Children's Homes Act 1982 (c. 20)) to repeal enactments about the designation of health authorities as teaching authorities and membership of authorities so designated; to make further provision for social security adjudication; to make further provision for fees for medical practitioners' certificates relating to notifiable diseases and food poisoning; to abolish certain advisory bodies; to make minor alterations in certain enactments relating to health; and for connected purposes.
Copyright (Amendment) Act 1983 (repealed)	1983 c. 42	13 May 1983
An Act to amend section 21 of the Copyright Act 1956 (Note: Copyright Act 1956 (4 & 5 Eliz. 2. c. 74)) so as to provide new penalties for offences relating to infringing copies of sound recordings and cinematograph films; and to provide for the issue and execution of search warrants in relation to such offences. (Repealed by Copyright, Designs and Patents Act 1988 (c. 48))
Road Traffic (Driving Licences) Act 1983 (repealed)	1983 c. 43	13 May 1983
An Act to make provision about the granting, without tests of competence to drive, of driving licences to certain persons who are resident in Great Britain and are or have been authorised to drive under the law in force in places outside Great Britain, and for connected purposes. (Repealed by Statute Law (Repeals) Act 1993 (c. 50))
National Audit Act 1983	1983 c. 44	13 May 1983
An Act to strengthen Parliamentary control and supervision of expenditure of public money by making new provision for the appointment and status of the Comptroller and Auditor General, establishing a Public Accounts Commission and a National Audit Office and making new provision for promoting economy, efficiency and effectiveness in the use of such money by government departments and other authorities and bodies; to amend or repeal certain provisions of the Exchequer and Audit Departments Acts 1866 (Note: Exchequer and Audit Departments Act 1866 (29 & 30 Vict. c. 39)) and 1921; (Note: Exchequer and Audit Departments Act 1921 (11 & 12 Geo. 5. c. 52)) and for connected purposes.
County Courts (Penalties for Contempt) Act 1983	1983 c. 45	13 May 1983
An Act to provide for county courts to be treated as superior courts for the purposes of section 14 of the Contempt of Court Act 1981. (Note: Contempt of Court Act 1981 (c. 49))
Agricultural Holdings (Amendment) (Scotland) Act 1983 (repealed)	1983 c. 46	13 May 1983
An Act to amend the law relating to termination of tenancies of agricultural holdings in Scotland and to variation of rent for such holdings; and for connected purposes. (Repealed by Agricultural Holdings (Scotland) Act 1991 (c. 55))
National Heritage Act 1983	1983 c. 47	13 May 1983
An Act to establish Boards of Trustees of the Victoria and Albert Museum, the Science Museum, the Armouries and the Royal Botanic Gardens, Kew, to transfer property to them and confer functions on them, to make provision in relation to government grants to, and employment by, armed forces museums, to establish a Historic Buildings and Monuments Commission for England, to confer functions on the Commission, to dissolve the Historic Buildings Council for England and the Ancient Monuments Board for England, to amend certain enactments relating to the heritage, and for connected purposes.
Appropriation (No. 2) Act 1983	1983 c. 48	26 July 1983
An Act to apply a sum out of the Consolidated Fund to the service of the year ending on 31st March 1984, and to appropriate the supplies granted in this Session of Parliament.
Finance (No. 2) Act 1983	1983 c. 49	26 July 1983
An Act to grant certain duties, to alter other duties, and to amend the law relating to the National Debt and the Public Revenue, and to make further provision in connection with Finance.
Companies (Beneficial Interests) Act 1983 (repealed)	1983 c. 50	26 July 1983
An Act to provide for disregarding certain interests and rights in determining for the purposes of provisions of the Companies Act 1948 (Note: Companies Act 1948 (11 & 12 Geo. 6. c. 38)) and the Companies Act 1980 (Note: Companies Act 1980 (c. 22)) whether a company is beneficially interested under a trust or has a beneficial interest in shares. (Repealed by Companies Consolidation (Consequential Provisions) Act 1985 (c. 9))
International Monetary Arrangements Act 1983	1983 c. 51	26 July 1983
An Act to substitute a new limit for the limit on lending to the International Monetary Fund imposed by section 2(1) of the International Monetary Fund Act 1979 (Note: International Monetary Fund Act 1979 (c. 29)) and to provide for the Bank of England to be indemnified in respect of certain financial assistance.
Local Authorities (Expenditure Powers) Act 1983	1983 c. 52	26 July 1983
An Act to remove certain restrictions on the powers of local authorities under section 137 of the Local Government Act 1972 and section 83 of the Local Government (Scotland) Act 1973.
Car Tax Act 1983	1983 c. 53	26 July 1983
An Act to consolidate the enactments relating to car tax.
Medical Act 1983	1983 c. 54	26 July 1983
An Act to consolidate the Medical Acts 1956 to 1978 and certain related provisions, with amendments to give effect to recommendations of the Law Commission and the Scottish Law Commission.
Value Added Tax Act 1983 (repealed)	1983 c. 55	26 July 1983
An Act to consolidate the enactments relating to value added tax. (Repealed by Value Added Tax Act 1994 (c. 23))
Oil Taxation Act 1983	1983 c. 56	1 December 1983
An Act to vary the reliefs available for certain expenditure incurred in connection with assets used or to be used in connection with oil fields; to bring into charge to petroleum revenue tax certain sums received or receivable in respect of such assets and of certain other assets situated in the United Kingdom, the territorial sea thereof or a designated area, within the meaning of the Continental Shelf Act 1964; (Note: Continental Shelf Act 1964 (c. 29)) to amend Part II of the Oil Taxation Act 1975 (Note: Oil Taxation Act 1975 (c. 22)) in relation to sums so received or receivable; and for connected purposes.
Consolidated Fund (No. 3) Act 1983	1983 c. 57	21 December 1983
An Act to apply certain sums out of the Consolidated Fund to the service of the years ending on 31st March 1984 and 1985.
British Shipbuilders (Borrowing Powers) Act 1983 (repealed)	1983 c. 58	21 December 1983
An Act to amend section 11(7) of the Aircraft and Shipbuilding Industries Act 1977. (Note: Aircraft and Shipbuilding Industries Act 1977 (c. 3)) (Repealed by Public Bodies (Abolition of British Shipbuilders) Order 2013 (SI 2013/687))
Petroleum Royalties (Relief) Act 1983	1983 c. 59	21 December 1983
An Act to confer on holders of petroleum production licences an exemption from royalties (including royalties in kind) in respect of petroleum from certain new fields off the coast of Great Britain.
Coal Industry Act 1983	1983 c. 60	21 December 1983
An Act to increase the limit on the borrowing powers of the National Coal Board; and to make further provision with respect to grants and payments by the Secretary of State in connection with the coal industry.

== Local acts ==
Short title	Citation	Royal assent
Long title
Ullapool Pier (Works) Order Confirmation Act 1983	1983 c. i	8 February 1983
An Act to confirm a Provisional Order under the Private Legislation Procedure (Scotland) Act 1936, (Note: Private Legislation Procedure (Scotland) Act 1936 (26 Geo. 5 & 1 Edw. 8. c. 52)) relating to Ullapool Pier (Works).
	Ullapool Pier (Works) Order 1982 (Note: Although passed in 1983, the short title specifies the year 1982.) Provisional Order to authorise the construction of works; and for other purposes.	
British Waterways Act 1983	1983 c. ii	8 February 1983
An Act to confer further powers on the British Waterways Board; to make further provisions for the control and regulation of the Board's waterways; to make provisions in relation to certain statutory and other obligations of the Board; and for other purposes.
Greater London Council (General Powers) Act 1983	1983 c. iii	28 March 1983
An Act to confer further powers upon the Greater London Council and other authorities; and for other purposes.
British Railways (Liverpool Street Station) Act 1983	1983 c. iv	11 April 1983
An Act to empower the British Railways Board to construct works and to purchase lands in the city of London and in the London boroughs of Hackney and Tower Hamlets; to confer further powers on the Board and for other purposes.
Hampshire Act 1983	1983 c. v	9 May 1983
An Act to re-enact with amendments and to extend certain local enactments in force within the county of Hampshire; to confer further powers on the Hampshire County Council and local authorities in the county; to make further provision with regard to the environment, local government, improvement, health and finances of the county; and for other purposes.
Parkeston Quay Act 1983	1983 c. vi	13 May 1983
An Act to empower Sealink Harbours Limited to construct works and to acquire land at Parkeston Quay; to confer further powers on the Company; and for other purposes.
Ashridge (Bonar Law Memorial) Trust Act 1983	1983 c. vii	26 July 1983
An Act to amend the Ashridge (Bonar Law Memorial) Trust Act 1954; (Note: Ashridge (Bonar Law Memorial) Trust Act 1954 (2 & 3 Eliz. 2. c. xviii)) and for other purposes.
Associated British Ports Act 1983	1983 c. viii	26 July 1983
An Act to empower Associated British Ports to construct works and to acquire lands; to confer further powers on A.B. Ports; and for other purposes.
Commons Registration (Glamorgan) Act 1983	1983 c. ix	26 July 1983
An Act to make provision for the validation of the registers of common land maintained under the Commons Registration Act 1965 (Note: Commons Registration Act 1965 (c. 64)) by the former Glamorgan County Council and Merthyr Tydfil and Swansea County Borough Councils; and for other purposes.
Tor Bay Harbour (Torquay Marina &c.) Act 1983	1983 c. x	26 July 1983
An Act to authorise the council of the borough of Torbay to construct works in the harbour at Torquay; to make provision for moorings and the licensing thereof; to amend the Tor Bay Harbour Act 1970; (Note: Tor Bay Harbour Act 1970 (c. liii)) and for other purposes.
London Transport (Liverpool Street) Act 1983	1983 c. xi	26 July 1983
An Act to empower the London Transport Executive to acquire lands; to confer further powers on the Executive; and for other purposes.
King's College London Act 1983	1983 c. xii	26 July 1983
An Act to reunite King's College Hospital Medical School (University of London) with King's College London; to transfer all rights, properties and liabilities from the School to the College; and for connected and other purposes.
Lloyds Bowmaker Act 1983	1983 c. xiii	27 October 1983
An Act to provide for the transfer to Lloyds Bowmaker Limited of the undertakings of certain subsidiaries of Lloyds and Scottish PLC; and for other purposes.
Pwllheli Harbour Act 1983	1983 c. xiv	1 December 1983
An Act to empower the Dwyfor District Council (Cyngor Dosbarth Dwyfor) to construct works at Pwllheli Harbour; to confer powers on them as the harbour authority for that harbour and for the provision of facilities therein; and for other purposes.
Greater London Council (Money) Act 1983	1983 c. xv	1 December 1983
An Act to regulate prescribed expenditure and expenditure on lending to other persons by the Greater London Council, including prescribed expenditure of the London Transport Executive and their wholly-owned subsidiaries which is to be treated as prescribed expenditure of the Greater London Council, during the financial period from 1st April 1983 to 30th September 1984; and for other purposes.
Severn-Trent Water Authority Act 1983	1983 c. xvi	1 December 1983
An Act to provide for the improvement of land drainage and the relief of flooding in the valley of the river Soar; to authorise the Severn-Trent Water Authority to construct works and to acquire lands; to confer further powers on the Authority; and for other purposes.
Standard Chartered Merchant Bank Act 1983	1983 c. xvii	1 December 1983
An Act to provide for the vesting in MAIBL PLC of the undertaking of Standard Chartered Merchant Bank Limited; and for other purposes.
Staffordshire Act 1983	1983 c. xviii	21 December 1983
An Act to re-enact with amendments and to extend certain local enactments in force within the county of Staffordshire; to confer further powers on the Staffordshire County Council and local authorities in the county; to make further provision with regard to the environment, local government, improvement, health and finances of the county; to make further provision regarding the trusts respectively relating to the burgesses and the Silverdale lands of the borough of Newcastle-under-Lyme and the Coton Field Estate in the borough of Stafford; and for other purposes.
Milford Haven Conservancy Act 1983	1983 c. xix	21 December 1983
An Act to repeal and re-enact with amendments the Milford Haven Conservancy Acts and Orders 1958 to 1980 and to make further provision with respect to the Milford Haven Conservancy Board; and for other purposes.

== See also ==
- List of acts of the Parliament of the United Kingdom
