= Competent harbour authority =

United Kingdom harbour authorities

Competent harbour authorities (CHA) in the United Kingdom are those harbour authorities that have been given statutory powers relating to the provision of pilotage in their waters. The description was created by the Pilotage Act 1987, at which point a CHA had to be one whose harbour was wholly or partly within a pilotage district where at least one act of pilotage had been performed, or where a pilotage exemption certificate had been in force, between 1984 and 1987. However, the act provided a procedure by which other harbour authorities could be assigned CHA status and some harbours have taken advantage of this process. The Marine Navigation Act 2013 amended the Pilotage Act to provide a reverse process, so that harbour authorities could be relieved of CHA status.

== Statutory harbour authorities ==
A statutory harbour authority (SHA) is a different designation which permits harbours to charge dues and remove wrecks, as well as conferring the responsibility to maintain buoys and lighthouses within the area of the harbour. Statutory harbour authorities are regulated under the Harbours Act 1964.

All competent harbour authorities are also statutory harbour authorities.

== List of competent harbour authorities ==
The following are those harbour authorities that are currently identified as CHAs:

=== England and Wales ===
- Anglesey Borough Council (Amlwch)
- Associated British Ports:
  - Barrow
  - Barry
  - Cardiff
  - Fleetwood
  - Garston
  - Humber, Goole and Trent
  - King's Lynn
  - Lowestoft
  - Newport
  - Plymouth
  - Port Talbot
  - Silloth
  - Southampton
  - Swansea
- Berwick Harbour Commissioners
- Blyth Harbour Commissioners
- Boston Borough Council (joint arrangement with Fosdyke)
- Brightlingsea Harbour Commissioners
- Brighton Marina Company
- Bristol City Docks
- Bristol Port Company
- Broads Authority
- Caernarvon Harbour Trust
- Canterbury City Council (Whitstable)
- Carrick District Council (Falmouth)
- Carmarthenshire Council (Llanelli)
- Cattewater Harbour Commissioners (Plymouth)
- Chichester Harbour Conservancy
- Colchester Borough Council (Colne)
- Cowes Harbour Commissioners
- Crouch Harbour Authority
- Cumbria County Council (Workington)
- Dart Harbour & Navigation Authority
- Duchy of Cornwall (Scilly Isles)
- Dover Harbour Board
- Dwyfor District Council (Portmadoc)
- Environment Agency (Rye)
- Exeter City Council and Exmouth Dock Company (joint arrangement)
- Falmouth Dock Company
- Falmouth Harbour Commissioners
- Felixstowe Dock & Railway Company
- Port of Fosdyke (joint arrangement with Boston)
- Fowey Harbour Commissioners
- Gloucester Harbour Trustees
- Great Yarmouth Port Authority
- Harwich Haven Authority
- Isle of Wight Council (Newport)
- Ipswich Port Authority
- King's Lynn Conservancy Board
- Lancaster Port Commission
- Langstone Harbour Board
- Littlehampton Harbour Board
- Port of London Authority
- Looe Harbour Commissioners
- Lymington Harbour Commissioners
- Maldon Harbour Commissioners
- Manchester Ship Canal Company
- Maryport Harbour Authority
- Medway Ports Authority
- Mersey Docks & Harbour Company
- Milford Haven Port Authority
- Mostyn Docks Limited
- Mousehole Harbour Authority
- Neath Harbour Commissioners
- Newlyn Pier & Harbour Commissioners
- Newport Harbour Commissioners
- Padstow Harbour Commissioners
- Penwith District Council
- Poole Harbour Commissioners
- Portland Port Limited
- City of Portsmouth
- Porthleven Harbour & Dock Company
- Sandwich Port & Haven Commissioners
- Scarborough Borough Council (Scarborough & Whitby) (until 10 May 2021)
- Seaham Harbour Dock Company
- Sedgemoor District Council (Bridgwater)
- Shoreham Port Authority
- Stena Harbours:
  - Fishguard
  - Folkestone
  - Harwich Parkeston Quay
  - Hairy's Harbour
  - Heysham
  - Holyhead
  - Newhaven
- Sutton Bridge (under Wisbech Harbour Authority Nene Ports)
- Port of Sunderland Authority
- Tees & Hartlepool Port Authority
- Teignmouth Harbour Commissioners
- Teignmouth Quay Company (subsidiary of Associated British Ports)
- Thanet District Council (Ramsgate)
- Torbay Borough Council (Brixham)
- Torridge District Council (Bideford)
- Port of Tyne Authority
- Warkworth Harbour Commissioners
- Waveney District Council (Southwold)
- Wells Harbour Commissioners
- West Dorset District Council (Bridport)
- West Somerset District Council (Watchet)
- Weymouth & Portland Borough Council
- Whitehaven Harbour Commissioners
- Worthing Borough Council
- Wisbech Harbour Authority (Nene Ports)
- Yorkshire Ouse (British Waterways)

==== Former competent harbour authorities ====
- Yarmouth Harbour Commissioners was a CHA until 2015 when its pilotage functions were revoked.
- Scarborough Borough Council was a CHA until 10 May 2021 when its pilotage functions were revoked.

=== Scotland ===
- Associated British Ports:
  - Ayr
  - Troon
- Aberdeen Harbour Board
- Clyde Port Authority
- Cromarty Firth Port Authority
- Dumfries and Galloway Council
- Dundee Port Authority
- Forth Ports Authority
- Fraserburgh Harbour Commissioners
- Inverness Harbour Trust
- Irvine Harbour Company
- Lerwick Harbour Trust
- Montrose Harbour Trust
- Moray Council (Buckie & Burghead)
- Orkney Islands Council
- Peterhead Bay Authority and Trustees of the Harbour of Peterhead (joint arrangement)
- Shetland Islands Council (Sullom Voe & Scalloway)
- Stornoway Pier & Harbour Commission
- Strathclyde Regional Council (Rothesay)
- Wick Harbour Trust

=== Northern Ireland ===
- Belfast Harbour Commissioners
- Coleraine Harbour Commissioners
- Londonderry Port & Harbour Commissioners
- Warrenpoint Harbour Authority
- Carlingford Lough Commissioners
