= Dentists Act 1984 =

Act of the Parliament of the United Kingdom

Dentists Act 1984 (Note: Section 56(1).)
- Act of Parliament
- Parliament of the United Kingdom
- Long title: An Act to consolidate the Dentists Acts 1957 to 1983, with an amendment to give effect to a recommendation of the Law Commission and the Scottish Law Commission.
- Citation: 1984 c. 24
- Territorial extent: United Kingdom (Note: Section 56(2).)

Dates
- Royal assent: 26 June 1984
- Commencement: 26 July 1984 (in part); 1 October 1984; 1 January 1985 (Note: The Dentists Act 1984 (Commencement) Order 1984.); (Note: Section 55.)

Other legislation
- Amends: Medical and Dentists Acts Amendment Act 1927; Misuse of Drugs Act 1971; Poisons Act 1972; Health and Personal Social Services (Northern Ireland) Order 1972; Fair Trading Act 1973; Restrictive Trade Practices Act 1976; National Health Service Act 1977; National Health Service (Scotland) Act 1978; Medical Act 1983; Value Added Tax Act 1983; See § Repealed enactments
- Repeals/revokes: See § Repealed enactments
- Amended by: Irish Republic (Termination of 1927 Agreement) Order 1987; Statute Law (Repeals) Act 1993; Value Added Tax Act 1994; Dental Qualifications (Recognition) Regulations 1996; National Health Service (Primary Care) Act 1997; Health Services (Primary Care) (Northern Ireland) Order 1997; Dentists Act 1984 (Amendment) Order 1998; Dentists Act 1984 (Amendment) Order 2001; National Health Service Reform and Health Care Professions Act 2002; Medical Act 1983 (Amendment) Order 2002; Health and Social Care (Community Health and Standards) Act 2003; Civil Partnership Act 2004; Smoking, Health and Social Care (Scotland) Act 2005; Dentists Act 1984 (Amendment) Order 2005; National Health Service (Consequential Provisions) Act 2006; European Qualifications (Health and Social Care Professions) Regulations 2007; Companies Act 2006 (Consequential Amendments etc) Order 2008; Health Care and Associated Professions (Miscellaneous Amendments and Practitioner Psychologists) Order 2009; Health and Social Care Act 2012; Health Care and Associated Professions (Indemnity Arrangements) Order 2014; Health and Social Care (Safety and Quality) Act 2015; Health Care and Associated Professions (Knowledge of English) Order 2015; General Dental Council (Fitness to Practise etc.) Order 2016; Data Protection Act 2018; European Qualifications (Health and Social Care Professions) (Amendment etc.) (EU Exit) Regulations 2019; Data Protection, Privacy and Electronic Communications (Amendments etc) (EU Exit) Regulations 2019; Health and Social Care Act (Northern Ireland) 2022; Health and Social Care Act (Northern Ireland) 2022 (Consequential Amendments) Order 2022; Dentists, Dental Care Professionals, Nurses, Nursing Associates and Midwives (International Registrations) Order 2023; Recognition of Professional Qualifications and Implementation of International Recognition Agreements (Amendment) Regulations 2023; Recognition of Professional Qualifications and Implementation of International Recognition Agreements (Amendment) (Extension to Switzerland etc.) Regulations 2024

Status: Amended

Text of statute as originally enacted

Revised text of statute as amended

Text of the Dentists Act 1984 as in force today (including any amendments) within the United Kingdom, from legislation.gov.uk.

The Dentists Act 1984 (c. 24) is an act of the Parliament of the United Kingdom regulating dentistry. In particular the function of the General Dental Council, dental bodies corporate etc. It is a consolidation bill passed to implement the recommendation of the joint report of the Law Commission for England and Wales and the Scottish Law Commission.

== Provisions ==
=== Repealed enactments ===
Section 54(2) of the act repealed 9 enactments, listed in part I of schedule 6 to the act.

Citation	Short title	Extent of repeal
5 & 6 Eliz. 2. c. 28	Dentists Act 1957	The whole act.
1973 c. 31	Dentists (Amendment) Act 1973	The whole act.
1973 c. 32	National Health Service Reorganisation Act 1973	In Schedule 4, paragraph 80.
1975 c. 21	Criminal Procedure (Scotland) Act 1975	In Schedule 7A, paragraphs 8 to 10.
1977 c. 45	Criminal Law Act 1977	In Schedule 1, paragraphs 11 to 13.
1977 c. 49	National Health Service Act 1977	In Schedule 15, paragraph 18.
1978 c. 29	National Health Service (Scotland) Act 1978	In Schedule 16, paragraph 10.
1983 c. 38	Dentists Act 1983	The whole act.
1983 c. 54	Medical Act 1983	In Schedule 5, paragraphs 1 and 19.

Section 54(3) of the act revoked 3 instruments, listed in part II of schedule 6 to the act.

Citation	Title	Extent of revocation
SI 1980/703	Dental Qualifications (EEC Recognition) Order 1980	Articles 3, 4, 6 and 7.
SI 1980/1721	Medical, Nursing and Dental Qualifications (EEC Recognition) (Greek Qualifications) Order 1980	Article 6.
SI 1982/1076	Medical, Nursing, Dental and Veterinary Qualifications (EEC Recognition) Order 1982	Article 4.
