= Medical Act 1983 =

Act of the Parliament of the United Kingdom

Medical Act 1983 (Note: Section 57(1).)
- Act of Parliament
- Parliament of the United Kingdom
- Long title: An Act to consolidate the Medical Acts 1956 to 1978 and certain related provisions, with amendments to give effect to recommendations of the Law Commission and the Scottish Law Commission.
- Citation: 1983 c. 54
- Territorial extent: United Kingdom (Note: Section 57(3).)

Dates
- Royal assent: 26 July 1983
- Commencement: 26 October 1983 (Note: Section 57(2).)

Other legislation
- Amends: Misuse of Drugs Act 1971; See § Repealed enactments
- Repeals/revokes: See § Repealed enactments
- Amended by: Dentists Act 1984; Statute Law (Repeals) Act 1993; Medical (Professional Performance) Act 1995; National Health Service (Consequential Provisions) Act 2006
- Relates to: Dentists Act 1983

Status: Amended

Text of statute as originally enacted

Revised text of statute as amended

Text of the Medical Act 1983 as in force today (including any amendments) within the United Kingdom, from legislation.gov.uk.

The Medical Act 1983 (c. 54) is an act of the Parliament of the United Kingdom which governs the regulation and credentials of the medical profession, and defines offences in respect of false claims of fitness to practise medicine.

== Provisions ==
The act consolidated the Medical Acts 1956 to 1978 and with certain related provisions and amendments gave effect to recommendations of the Law Commission and the Scottish Law Commission.

The Medical Act 1858 (21 & 22 Vict. c. 90) established the General Council of Medical Education & Registration of the United Kingdom, now known as the GMC. It stated that under the Poor Law system boards of guardians could only employ those qualified in medicine and surgery as Poor Law doctors. Poor Law hospitals were transferred to local government by the Poor Law Act 1930 (20 & 21 Geo. 5. c. 17). These were unified under the National Health Service Act 1946.

The 1858 act also created the position of Registrar of the General Medical Council — an office still in existence today — whose duty is to keep an up-to-date record of those registered with the membership body and to make them publicly available.

The Brynmor Jones Working Party on the Constitution of the GMC reported in 1971. Subsequently, the government announced its intention to introduce a bill to reconstitute the GMC. At the same time about 8,000 doctors, with support from the BMA, refused to pay the annual £5 retention fee. It was submitted in Parliament that the GMC had asked for amendments of the Medical Act 1956 (4 & 5 Eliz. 2. c. 76) in order to secure a striking off from the register of any doctor who did not pay the levy. A public inquiry into the structure and function of the GMC, headed by Dr Alec Merrison, followed with evidence submitted by a BMA committee in 1973.

The Medical Act 1978 (c. 12), which followed the Merrison Report made the GMC more accountable, extended its functions particularly in relation to medical education, and separated the disciplinary processes from those that deal with doctors whose performance is impaired by ill-health. The provisions of the 1978 Act were consolidated into the Medical Act 1983 (as amended by statutory instrument) and set out the modern structure of the council.

The Medical (Professional Performance) Act 1995 (c. 51) amended the 1983 act and made provisions relating to the professional performance of registered medical practitioners and the voluntary removal of names from the register of medical practitioners.

The General Medical Council's power, under the enabling Medical Act 1983, to make regulations with respect to the medical register can only come into force when approved by order of the Privy Council. Orders of Council are orders that do not require personal approval by the sovereign, but which can be made by the Lords of the Privy Council. These can be statutory or made under the royal prerogative. Statutory Orders of Council include approval of regulations made by the General Medical Council and other regulatory bodies.

Significant Orders of Council with respect to the act are the General Medical Council (Fitness to Practise) Rules Order of Council 2004 (SI 2004/2608) and the General Medical Council (Voluntary Erasure and Restoration following Voluntary Erasure) Regulations Order of Council 2004 (SI 2004/2609).

=== Repealed enactments ===
Section 56(2) of the act repealed 14 enactments, listed in part I of schedule 7 to the act.

Part I – enactments repealed
Citation	Short title	Extent of repeal
4 & 5 Eliz. 2. c. 76	Medical Act 1956	The whole act.
5 & 6 Eliz. 2. c. 28	Dentists Act 1957	In section 2(4) the words "subject to the next following subsection". Section 2(5).
6 & 7 Eliz. 2. c. 58	Medical Act 1956 (Amendment) Act 1958	The whole act.
10 & 11 Eliz. 2. c. 23	South Africa Act 1962	In Schedule 3, paragraph 3.
1966 c. 13	Universities (Scotland) Act 1966	In Schedule 6, paragraph 20.
1969 c. 40	Medical Act 1969	The whole act.
1972 c. 41	Finance Act 1972	In Schedule 4, Note (2)(b) to Group 14. In Schedule 5, Note (4) to Group 7.
1973 c. 48	Pakistan Act 1973	In Schedule 3, paragraph 4(a).
1973 c. 49	Bangladesh Act 1973	In the Schedule, paragraph 12.
1977 c. 49	National Health Service Act 1977	In Schedule 14, in paragraph 13(1)(b), the reference to paragraph 69 of the National Health Service Reorganisation Act 1973. In Schedule 15, paragraph 14.
1978 c. 12	Medical Act 1978	The whole act.
1978 c. 29	National Health Service (Scotland) Act 1978	In Schedule 16, paragraph 9.
1981 c. 54	Supreme Court Act 1981	In Schedule 5, the entries relating to the Medical Act 1956 and the Medical Act 1978.
1983 c. 41	Health and Social Services and Social Security Adjudications Act 1983	In Schedule 6, paragraph 1.

Section 56(3) of the act revoked 4 instruments, listed in part II of schedule 7 to the act.

Part II – revocation
Citation	Title	Extent of revocation
SI 1977/827	Medical Qualifications (EEC Recognition) Order 1977	Articles 3, 4, 7 and 8.
SI 1980/872	General Medical Council (Qualifying Examinations) (University of Leicester) Order 1980	The whole order.
SI 1980/1721	Medical, Nursing and Dental Qualifications (EEC Recognition) (Greek Qualifications) Order 1980	Article 2.
SI 1982/1076	Medical, Nursing, Dental and Veterinary Qualifications (EEC Recognition) Order 1982	Article 2(1).
