= Dental body corporate =

A dental bodies corporate (DBC) is a corporation entitled to practice dentistry in the UK using the structure of a limited company.

== History ==
DBCs have practised dentistry in the UK for over a hundred years. The Dentists Act 1878 (41 & 42 Vict. c. 33) established a register for qualified dentists in order to combat an increase in unregistered practice by dental companies. In its 1946 report, the Teviot Committee recommended the inclusion of a comprehensive dental service as part of a national health service. As a result, the General Dental Council (GDC) was established to make dentistry a self-governing profession.

The 1955 Dentists Bill prohibited DBCs from dentistry unless they were open and practising on 21 July 1955, as well as registered with the GDC. When the bill received royal assent on 15 March 1956, there were 74 DBCs listed. This number fell to 27 in 2002 when DBCs became the subject of a government consultation.

Although DBCs were originally limited in number by the Dentists Act 1984, their status changed following a 2005 amendment to the act which removed key restrictions. Although a DBC does not require GDC approval to set itself up, it must satisfy the requirements of sections 40 and 43 of the Dentists Act 1984. The GDC was also required to maintain a list of DBCs.

DBCs have since expanded to the extent that in 2015, they held over 40% of NHS contracts in England worth over £1.3 billion.
