= Pilotage Act 1987 =

Act of the Parliament of the United Kingdom

Pilotage Act 1987 (Note: Section 33(1).)
- Act of Parliament
- Parliament of the United Kingdom
- Long title: An Act to make new provision in respect of pilotage.
- Citation: 1987 c. 21
- Territorial extent: United Kingdom (Note: Section 33(4).)

Dates
- Royal assent: 15 May 1987
- Commencement: various (Note: Section 33(2)–(3).)

Other legislation
- Amends: See § Repealed enactments
- Repeals/revokes: See § Repealed enactments
- Amended by: Pilotage Act 1987 (Cessation of Temporary Arbitration Procedure) Order and Regulations 1991; Statute Law (Repeals) Act 1993; Merchant Shipping Act 1995; Employment Rights Act 1996; Petroleum Act 1998; Local Authorities (Executive and Alternative Arrangements) (Modification of Enactments and Other Provisions) (England) Order 2001; Local Authorities (Executive and Alternative Arrangements) (Modification of Enactments and Other Provisions) (Wales) Order 2002; Pilotage (Recognition of Qualifications and Experience) Regulations 2003; Statute Law (Repeals) Act 2004; Employment Equality (Age) Regulations 2006; Transport and Works (Scotland) Act 2007; Marine Navigation Act 2013; Pilotage Act 1987 (Amendment) Regulations 2019; Pilotage and Port Services (Amendment) (EU Exit) Regulations 2020; Local Government and Elections (Wales) Act 2021

Status: Amended

Text of statute as originally enacted

Revised text of statute as amended

Text of the Pilotage Act 1987 as in force today (including any amendments) within the United Kingdom, from legislation.gov.uk.

The Pilotage Act 1987 (c. 21) is an act of the Parliament of the United Kingdom that governs the operation of maritime pilotage. The act repealed the previous pilotage legislation in its entirety, the Pilotage Act 1983 (c. 21), which itself had repealed the Pilotage Act 1913 (2 & 3 Geo. 5. c. 31).

== Provisions ==
The act requires competent harbour authorities (CHA) to keep under consideration what pilotage services are needed to secure the safety of ships and gives them powers to:

- make pilotage compulsory within their pilotage district and levy charges for the use of a pilot;
- grant pilotage exemption certificates (PEC) to any bona fide master or first mate who has the skill, experience or local knowledge to pilot their own ship in a compulsory pilotage area; and,
- authorise pilots within their district.

The act requires the Secretary of State to maintain a list of CHAs, and also allows the Secretary of State to authorise other bodies to grant deep sea pilotage certificates in respect of such part of the sea falling outside the harbour of any CHA.

=== Repealed enactments ===
Section 32(5) of the act repealed 8 enactments and revoked 1 instrument, listed in schedule 3 to the act.

Citation	Short title	Extent of repeal or revocation
1975 c. 8	Offshore Petroleum Development (Scotland) Act 1975	In section 6(2), the words "and, where appropriate, any pilotage authority".
1975 c. 24	House of Commons Disqualification Act 1975	In part II of schedule 1, the entry relating to the Pilotage Commission.
1975 c. 25	Northern Ireland Assembly Disqualification Act 1975	In part II of schedule 1, the entry relating to the Pilotage Commission.
1979 c. 39	Merchant Shipping Act 1979	In section 50(2), the definition of "the Commission" and in the definition of "the Merchant Shipping Acts" the words "and the Pilotage Act 1983". schedule 1.
1979 c. 55	Justices of the Peace Act 1979	Section 33(3)(b).
1980 c. 43	Magistrates' Courts Act 1980	In part III of schedule 6, paragraph 4.
1981 c. 69	Wildlife and Countryside Act 1981	In section 36(7), in the definition of "relevant authority", the words "a pilotage authority".
1983 c. 21	Pilotage Act 1983	The whole act.
SI 1985/170 (N.I. 1)	Nature Conservation and Amenity Lands (Northern Ireland) Order 1985	Article 20(6)(f).

== Competent harbour authority ==
The act established the definition of a CHA as any harbour authority that has statutory powers relating to the regulation of shipping movements and the safety of navigation. Initially, a CHA also had to be one whose harbour was wholly or partly within a pilotage district where at least one act of pilotage had been performed, or where a PEC had been in force, between 1984 and 1987. However, the act provided a procedure by which other harbour authorities could be assigned CHA status.

== Impact of the act ==
Prior to this act, Trinity House was responsible for the provision of local pilots for entering ports. Today, the Corporation of Trinity House is one three authorised bodies responsible for deep sea pilotage, working closely with Trinity House Newcastle upon Tyne and Trinity House Hull to examine and license deep sea pilots.

Following the Sea Empress disaster in 1996, the Department for Environment, Transport and the Regions undertook a review of the act which concluded that "Pilotage should rightly remain the responsibility of the CHAs and become integrated with other port marine activity under the management and responsibility of one Statutory Authority". The principal recommendation of the Review was for the establishment of the Port Marine Safety Code, which was first published in 2000.

The act has been amended by the Marine Navigation Act 2013 to:

- provide a mechanism for a CHA to relinquish its duties and powers in respect of pilotage;
- permit pilotage exemption certificates to be awarded to a bona fide deck officer (qualified as before by reference to skill, experience and local knowledge); and,
- tighten powers on the use, suspension and revocation of pilotage exemption certificates.
