= Pilotage Act 1983 =

Act of the Parliament of the United Kingdom

Pilotage Act 1983 (Note: Section 70(1).)
- Act of Parliament
- Parliament of the United Kingdom
- Long title: An Act to consolidate the Pilotage Acts 1913 and 1936 and certain provisions of the Merchant Shipping Act 1979.
- Citation: 1983 c. 21
- Territorial extent: United Kingdom (Note: Section 70(2).)

Dates
- Royal assent: 9 May 1983
- Commencement: 9 August 1983 (Note: Section 70(4).)
- Repealed: 30 April 1991 (Note: The Pilotage Act 1987 (Commencement No. 4) Order 1991 (SI 1991/1029).)

Other legislation
- Amends: See § Repealed enactments
- Repeals/revokes: See § Repealed enactments
- Amended by: Income and Corporation Taxes Act 1988
- Repealed by: Pilotage Act 1987

Status: Repealed

Text of statute as originally enacted

The Pilotage Act 1983 (c. 21) was an act of the Parliament of the United Kingdom that consolidated enactments related to pilotage in the United Kingdom.

== Provisions ==
=== Repealed enactments ===
Section 69(3) of the act repealed 6 enactments, listed in schedule 4 to the act.

Citation	Short title	Extent of repeal
2 & 3 Geo. 5. c. 31	Pilotage Act 1913	The whole act.
1936 c. 36	Pilotage Authorities (Limitation of Liability) Act 1936	The whole act.
1950 c. 9	Merchant Shipping Act 1950	In section 7(1), the definition of "pilotage authority".
1971 c. 68	Finance Act 1971	In part VI of schedule 14, the entry relating to the Pilotage Act 1913.
1979 c. 2	Customs and Excise Management Act 1979	In part I of the Table in schedule 4, the entry relating to the Pilotage Act 1913.
1979 c. 39	Merchant Shipping Act 1979	Sections 1 to 13. Schedule 2. In schedule 5, paragraph 2. In schedule 7, in part II, the entries relating to the Pilotage Act 1913.

== Subsequent developments ==
The whole act was repealed by section 32(5) of, and schedule 3 to, the Pilotage Act 1987, which came into force on 30 April 1991.
