= Port marine safety code =

The UK Port Marine Safety Code (PMSC) was developed in 2000 and offers a national standard for port safety in the UK with the aim to "improve safety for those who use or work in ports, their ships, passengers and cargoes, and the environment".

Creation of the Code was prompted by a review of the Pilotage Act 1987 undertaken in 1998 by the Department for Environment, Transport and the Regions in the aftermath of the 1996 Sea Empress disaster.

All Harbour Authorities are expected to comply with the Code. As the Code is not statutory, failure to comply is not an offence in itself, but the Code does set out references to legal duties that do exist and not adhering to it may be indicative of a breach of those duties.

The Code is subject to a triennial review process by a steering group of maritime organisations. It was reissued in 2003, 2006, 2009, 2012 and 2016.

== See also ==
- Port
- Harbour
