= Dentists Act 1957 =

Act of the Parliament of the United Kingdom

Dentists Act 1957 (Note: Section 53(1).)
- Act of Parliament
- Parliament of the United Kingdom
- Long title: An Act to consolidate the enactments relating to dentists and other dental workers with corrections and improvements authorised under the Consolidation of Enactments (Procedure) Act, 1949.
- Citation: 5 & 6 Eliz. 2. c. 28
- Territorial extent: United Kingdom (Note: Section 52.)

Dates
- Royal assent: 6 June 1957
- Commencement: 6 September 1957 (Note: Section 53(2).)
- Repealed: 1 October 1984
Other legislation
| Amends | See § Repealed enactments |
| Repeals/revokes | See § Repealed enactments |
| Amended by | Criminal Justice Act 1972; Dentists (Amendment) Act 1973; Statute Law (Repeals) Act 1974; Law Reform (Miscellaneous Provisions) (Scotland) Act 1980; Dentists Act 1983; Medical Act 1983 |
| Repealed by | Dentists Act 1984 |

Status: Repealed

Text of statute as originally enacted

The Dentists Act 1957 (5 & 6 Eliz. 2. c. 28) was an act of the Parliament of the United Kingdom that consolidated enactments relating to dentists and other dental workers in the United Kingdom.

== Provisions ==
=== Repealed enactments ===
Section 51(1) of the act repealed 5 enactments, listed in the second schedule to the act.

| Citation | Short title | Extent of repeal |
|---|---|---|
| 41 & 42 Vict. c. 33 | Dentists Act 1878 | Section two. Section five so far as it applies in the United Kingdom. Sections six to forty and the Schedule. |
| 11 & 12 Geo. 5. c. 21 | Dentists Act 1921 | The whole act. |
| 13 & 14 Geo. 5. c. 36 | Dentists Act 1923 | The whole act. |
| 17 & 18 Geo. 5. c. 39 | Medical and Dentists Acts Amendment Act 1927 | In section two, in subsection (1) the words from "and so far as" to the end of the subsection and subsection (2). In section three, subsection (3). |
| 4 & 5 Eliz. 2. c. 29 | Dentists Act 1956 | The whole Act except subsection (9) of section sixteen and in subsection (1) of section thirty-seven the short title. |

== Subsequent developments ==
Section 51(1) of, and schedule 2 to, the act were repealed by section 1 of, and part XI of the schedule to, the Statute Law (Repeals) Act 1974, which came into force on 27 June 1974.

The whole act was repealed by section 54(2) of, and part I of schedule 6 to, the Dentists Act 1984, which came into force on 1 October 1984.
