= Marine Navigation Act 2013 =

Act of the Parliament of the United Kingdom

Marine Navigation Act 2013 (Note: Section 14.)
- Act of Parliament
- Parliament of the United Kingdom
- Long title: An Act to make provision in relation to marine navigation and harbours.
- Citation: 2013 c. 23
- Introduced by: Sheryll Murray (Commons); Baroness Wilcox (Lords)
- Territorial extent: United Kingdom (Note: Section 12.)

Dates
- Royal assent: 25 April 2013
- Commencement: Various (Note: Section 13.)
Other legislation
Amends	Harbours Act 1964; Pilotage Act 1987; Merchant Shipping Act 1995
Relates to	Pilotage Act 1987; Harbours Act 1964; Merchant Shipping Act 1995

Status: Current legislation

History of passage through Parliament

Text of statute as originally enacted

Revised text of statute as amended

The Marine Navigation Act 2013 (c. 23) is an act of the Parliament of the United Kingdom that amends various existing legislation, in particular relating to pilotage and the powers of harbour authorities, ports police, and the general lighthouse authorities.

The act is the result of a private member's bill promoted by Sheryll Murray (the Conservative MP for South East Cornwall) and Baroness Wilcox (a Conservative peer). Much of its content has its origins in a draft Bill published by the Department for Transport in 2008.

The act achieved royal assent on 25 April 2013.

== Provisions ==
There are 11 substantive sections in the act:

- Sections 1 to 4 deal with pilotage and pilotage exemption certificates, amending the Pilotage Act 1987 principally to allow harbours to relinquish their duties and powers in relation to pilotage, and to permit pilotage exemption certificates to be issued to any qualified bona fide deck officer of a ship.
- Sections 5 and 6 provide procedures for harbour authorities to obtain powers to make directions to ships in their waters, or to close the harbour.
- Section 7 provides for ports police in England and Wales to operate outside the port in relation to port matters or to make an arrest within a port in relation to a crime committed outside the port (dependent on the consent of the chief officer of the relevant police area). This allowed Kent Police to grant permission to the Port of Dover Police.
- Sections 8, 9 and 11 relate to the powers of the general lighthouse authorities; their area of operation, their ability to enter into commercial agreements; and their use of electronic aids to navigation to mark wrecks.
- Section 10 provides for statutory instruments relating to manning of ships to refer to documents that may then be updated over time without having to make a new statutory instrument.
