= General Dental Council =

The General Dental Council (GDC) is an organisation which regulates dental professionals in the United Kingdom. It keeps an up-to-date register of all qualified dentists and other dental care professionals such as: dental hygienists, dental therapists, dental nurses, dental technicians and clinical dental technicians. It was established in 1956 to set and maintain standards in UK dentistry, with the aims of protecting the general public from unqualified dental professionals.

Its headquarters are in Paddington, London.

The General Dental Council has also stated that it aims to promote confidence in dental professionals and to be at the forefront of health care regulation. The GDC is tasked with ensuring that all dental professionals maintain up to date knowledge, controlling the quality of dental education in the country, ensuring a proper quality of care is given to the patients, and helping any patient who has questions or complaints. It is meant to act as a bridge of communication between the government, public and the dental professionals.

The General Dental Council is entirely funded by the profession it regulates.

== Registration of dental care professionals ==
The professions that the GDC include in the dental care professionals group are: dental nurse, dental technician, dental therapist, dental hygienist, orthodontic therapist and clinical dental technician.

On 31 July 2006 it became possible for dental nurses to voluntarily join the GDC register and in July 2008 it became a mandatory requirement.

== Overseas Registration Exam ==
The Overseas Registration Exam (ORE) is administered by the GDC, and is designed to test the knowledge, skills and professionalism of candidates against the standard expected of graduate dentists on first registration with the General Dental Council (GDC). This means that UK graduates and overseas dentists are expected to have the same basic level of knowledge and skills.

The ORE has two parts which must be taken – and passed – in order. The purpose of Part 1 is to test the candidates' application of knowledge to clinical practice and Part 2 is designed for candidates to demonstrate practical clinical skills.

== Council ==
From 1 October 2013 the Council has consisted of 12 members who are all appointed: 6 registrants and 6 lay members. The changes were specified in the General Dental Council (Constitution) (Amendment) Order 2012 that was made in July 2012. The new Council took office on 1 October 2013, supported by other new governance arrangements.

== History ==
It was established in 1956 by an amendment to the Dentists Act 1948, now updated in the Dentists Act 1984.

The Council was originally set up in 1956 with 50 members but has been restructured, with the number of members decreasing each time. On 1 October 2009, a smaller fully appointed Council took office with 24 members and a balance of 12 lay and 12 professional. The last Chair of the GDC to be elected was qualified dentist Kevin O'Brien who was in post from 21 September 2011 to 30 September 2013. In October 2013 further restructuring occurred.

== Oversight of health and social care regulators ==
The Professional Standards Authority for Health and Social Care (PSA), is an independent body accountable to the UK Parliament, which promotes the health and wellbeing of the public and oversees the nine UK healthcare regulators, including the General Dental Council.

The PSA review the performance of all regulators on an annual basis, identifying where things are being done well and where improvements can be made. The PSA review all final decisions made by fitness to practise committees. The PSA audit the initial stages of fitness to practise processes to examine whether the regulator is using effective decision-making processes.

== Criticism ==
Concerns about cost-effectiveness, levels of confidence in the GDC and cost-effectiveness of fitness to practise procedures were put to the CEO Evlynne Gilvarry by the British Dental Association (BDA) in an interview that was published in September 2014.

=== Annual Retention Fees ===
The GDC ran a consultation on the Annual Retention Fee (ARF) policy, which was open from 16 April until 4 June 2014. The GDC had received over 4000 responses to the consultation on the proposed 64% rise in the Annual Retention, fee, and 97% of responses were critical of the rise. The BDA took the step of appointing Forensic Accountants to analyse the figures presented by the GDC as justification for the rise. The subsequent report was quoted as being 'Damning' and resulted in the GDC having to engage KPMG to assess the figures which had been presented as evidence. In September 2014 the GDC's proposed increase in Annual Retention Fees led to threats of legal action from the BDA, the trade union and representative body of UK dentists.

The Professional Standards Authority assessed the GDC’s performance against its Standards of Good Regulation and judged that the GDC met 23 out of 24 of the Standards in 2016-17.

=== Fitness to practise process ===
The initial stages of the GDC's fitness to practise process were audited by the PSA with the findings published in December 2013. Dental Protection Limited have been highly critical of the way in which the GDC approach the Fitness to Practise Proceedings that are the disciplinary hearings Dentists have to undergo. The PSA announced in May 2014 that it would be undertaking an investigation of the management and support processes of the General Dental Council's Investigating Committee.

== Arms ==
Coat of arms of General Dental Council

Notes
Granted 12 June 1957
Crest
On a wreath of the colours a Blackheaded Plover (Pluvianus aegyptius) wings expanded and inverted Proper.
Escutcheon
Per fess indented Gules and Argent a lion rampant counterchanged holding between the paws a great pearl Proper.
Supporters
On the dexter side a representation of Hygeia Argent holding in the exterior hand a great pearl the arm entwined by a serpent also Argent and on the sinister side a representation of Aesculapius Argent holding in the exterior hand a like pearl the rod Argent resting against the sinister shoulder.
Motto
Esse Quam Videri
