= List of statutory instruments of the United Kingdom, 1980 =

This is an incomplete list of statutory instruments of the United Kingdom in 1980.

== Statutory instruments ==
=== 1-499 ===
==== 1–100 ====
- SI 1980/1 Industrial Training Levy (Rubber and Plastics Processing) Order 1980
- SI 1980/2 Town and Country Planning Act 1971 (Commencement No. 54) (South Yorkshire) Order 1980 [C. 1]
- SI 1980/3 Town and Country Planning (Repeal of Provisions No. 26) (South Yorkshire) Order 1980
- SI 1980/4 Butter and Concentrated Butter Prices (Amendment) Order 1980
- SI 1980/5 Insurance Companies (Valuation of Assets) (Amendment) Regulations 1980
- SI 1980/6 Insurance Companies (Accounts and Statements) Regulations 1980
- SI 1980/7 Medicines (General Sale List) Amendment Order 1980
- SI 1980/8 Weights and Measures (Marking of Goods and Abbreviations of Units) (Amendment) Regulations 1980
- SI 1980/9
- SI 1980/10
- SI 1980/11
- SI 1980/12 The Importation of Embryos, Ova and Semen Order 1980
- SI 1980/13 The Social Security (Contributions, Re-rating) Consequential Amendment Regulations 1980
- SI 1980/14 The Importation of Animal Products and Poultry Products Order 1980
- SI 1980/15 The Child Benefit (Determination of Claims and Questions) Amendment Regulations 1980
- SI 1980/16 The Medicines (Fees) Amendment Regulations 1980
- SI 1980/17
- SI 1980/18
- SI 1980/19 The Bingo Duty (Exemptions) Order 1980
- SI 1980/20
- SI 1980/21
- SI 1980/22
- SI 1980/23
- SI 1980/24 The Medicines (Prescription Only) Amendment Order 1980
- SI 1980/25 The Diseases of Animals (Approved Disinfectants) Amendment Order 1980
- SI 1980/26 The Protection from Execution (Prescribed Value) Order 1980
- SI 1980/27 The Gaming Clubs (Hours and Charges) (Amendment) Regulations 1980
- SI 1980/28 The Gaming Act (Variation of Monetary Limits) Order 1980
- SI 1980/29 The Amusements with Prizes (Variation of Monetary Limits) Order 1980
- SI 1980/30 The National Health Service (Vocational Training) (Scotland) Regulations 1980 [S. 1]
- SI 1980/31 The Housing Finance (Rent allowance Subsidy) Order 1980
- SI 1980/32 The Parish of Penzance Order 1980
- SI 1980/33
- SI 1980/34
- SI 1980/35 Anti-Dumping Duty (Temporary Suspension) Order 1980
- SI 1980/36 Chloroform in Food Regulations 1980
- SI 1980/37 Rate Support Grant (Amendment) Regulations 1980
- SI 1980/38
- SI 1980/39
- SI 1980/40 Town and Country Planning (Repeal of Provisions No. 27) (Bedfordshire) Order 1980
- SI 1980/41 Town and Country Planning (Commencement No. 55) (Bedfordshire) Order 1980 [C. 2]
- SI 1980/42 Kincardine and Deeside District (Electoral Arrangements) Order 1980
- SI 1980/43 District of Forest of Dean (Electoral Arrangements) Order 1980
- SI 1980/44 Opencast Coal (Rate of Interest on Compensation) Order 1980
- SI 1980/45 Savings Certificates (Amendment) Regulations 1980
- SI 1980/46
- SI 1980/47
- SI 1980/48 Milk (Great Britain) Order 1980
- SI 1980/49 Milk (Northern Ireland) Order 1980
- SI 1980/50 Consumer Credit Act 1974 (Commencement No. 6) Order 1980 [C. 3]
- SI 1980/51 Consumer Credit (Total Charge for Credit) Regulations 1980
- SI 1980/52 Consumer Credit (Exempt Agreements) Order 1980
- SI 1980/53 Consumer Credit (Exempt Advertisements) Order 1980
- SI 1980/54 Consumer Credit (Advertisements) Regulations 1980
- SI 1980/55 Consumer Credit (Quotations) Regulations 1980
- SI 1980/56
- SI 1980/57 Rate Support Grant Order 1979
- SI 1980/58 Rate Support Grant (Increase) Order 1979
- SI 1980/59 Rate Support Grant (Increase) (No. 2) Order 1979
- SI 1980/60
- SI 1980/61 Royal Navy Terms of Service (Amendment) Regulations 1980
- SI 1980/62 Insurance Brokers Registration Council Election Scheme Approval Order 1980
- SI 1980/63 City of Salford (Electoral Arrangements) Order 1980
- SI 1980/64 Rate Support Grant (Scotland) Order 1979 [S. 2]
- SI 1980/65 Town and Country Planning Act 1971 (Commencement No. 56) (South Glamorgan) Order 1980 [C. 4]
- SI 1980/66 Town and Country Planning (Repeal of Provisions No. 28) (South Glamorgan) Order 1980
- SI 1980/67 Customs Duties (ECSC) Order 1980
- SI 1980/68
- SI 1980/69
- SI 1980/70 Commissioners for Oaths (Fees) Order 1980
- SI 1980/71 Pensioners' Lump Sum Payments (Claims) Regulations 1980
- SI 1980/72
- SI 1980/73 Housing Support Grant (Scotland) Order 1980 [S. 5]
- SI 1980/74
- SI 1980/75 Housing Support Grant (Scotland) Variation Order 1980 [S. 4]
- SI 1980/76 Public Service Vehicles and Trolley Vehicles (Carrying Capacity) (Amendment) Regulations 1980
- SI 1980/77
- SI 1980/78
- SI 1980/79 Enzootic Bovine Leukosis Order 1980
- SI 1980/80 Enzootic Bovine Leukosis (Compensation) Order 1980
- SI 1980/81 Appointment of Ports (Forth, Tay and Arbroath) Order 1980
- SI 1980/82 Police Pensions (Amendment) Regulations 1980
- SI 1980/83 Public Lending Right Act 1979 (Commencement) Order 1980 [C. 5]
- SI 1980/84 Act of Sederunt (Sessions of Court and Sederunt Days) 1980 [S. 6]
- SI 1980/85 Borough of Wolverhampton (Electoral Arrangements) Order 1980
- SI 1980/86
- SI 1980/87
- SI 1980/88 Aviation Security Fund (Second Amendment) Regulations 1980
- SI 1980/89
- SI 1980/90
- SI 1980/91
- SI 1980/92
- SI 1980/93
- SI 1980/94
- SI 1980/95
- SI 1980/96 Designs (Amendment) Rules 1980
- SI 1980/97 Farm and Horticulture Development (Amendment) Regulations 1980
- SI 1980/98 Local Authorities (Allowances) (Scotland) Amendment Regulations 1980 [S. 7]
- SI 1980/99 West Lothian District (Electoral Arrangements) Order 1980
- SI 1980/100

== 101–200 ==
- SI 1980/101 Town and Country Planning Act 1971 (Commencement No. 57) (Northamptonshire) Order 1980 [C. 6]
- SI 1980/102 Town and Country Planning (Repeal of Provisions No. 29) (Northamptonshire) Order 1980
- SI 1980/103 Farm Capital Grant (Variation) Scheme 1980
- SI 1980/104 Horticulture Capital Grant (Variation) Scheme 1980
- SI 1980/105
- SI 1980/106
- SI 1980/107 National Health Service (General Ophthalmic Services) (Scotland) Amendment Regulations 1980 [S. 8]
- SI 1980/108 Magistrates' Courts (Reciprocal Enforcement of Maintenance Orders) (Hague Convention Countries) Rules 1980 [L. 1]
- SI 1980/109 Financial Assistance for Industry (Increase of Limit) Order 1979
- SI 1980/110 Child Benefit and Social Security (Fixing and Adjustment of Rates) Amendment Regulations 1980
- SI 1980/111 Road Traffic Accidents (Payments for Treatment) (England and Wales) Order 1980
- SI 1980/112
- SI 1980/113
- SI 1980/114 Income Tax (Excess Interest as Distributions) Order 1980
- SI 1980/115
- SI 1980/116 Road Vehicles Lighting (Amendment) Regulations 1980
- SI 1980/117
- SI 1980/118
- SI 1980/119
- SI 1980/120
- SI 1980/121
- SI 1980/122
- SI 1980/123
- SI 1980/124 Non-marketing of Milk and Milk Products and the Dairy Herd Conversion Premiums (Amendment) Regulations 1980
- SI 1980/125 Poisons List Order 1980
- SI 1980/126
- SI 1980/127 Poisons (Amendment) Rules 1980
- SI 1980/128
- SI 1980/129
- SI 1980/130
- SI 1980/131
- SI 1980/132
- SI 1980/133
- SI 1980/134
- SI 1980/135
- SI 1980/136 Dangerous Substances and Preparations (Safety) Regulations 1980
- SI 1980/137 Patents (Amendment) Rules 1980
- SI 1980/138 Borough of Hinckley and Bosworth (Electoral Arrangements) Order 1980
- SI 1980/139 Motor Vehicles (Construction and Use) (Amendment) (No. 2) Regulations 1980
- SI 1980/140 Motor Vehicles (Construction and Use) (Amendment) Regulations 1980
- SI 1980/141 Public Service Vehicles (Conditions of Fitness, Equipment and Use (Amendment) Regulations 1980
- SI 1980/142 Minibus (Conditions of Fitness, Equipment and Use (Amendment) Regulations 1980
- SI 1980/143 Gaming Clubs (Hours and Charges) (Scotland) Amendment Regulations 1980
- SI 1980/144 Community Bus (Amendment) Regulations 1980
- SI 1980/145 African Swine Fever Order 1980
- SI 1980/146 African Swine Fever (Compensation) Order 1980
- SI 1980/147
- SI 1980/148 Gaming Act (Variation of Monetary Limits) (Scotland) Order 1980 [S. 11]
- SI 1980/149 Amusements with Prizes (Variation of Monetary Limits) (Scotland) Order 1980 [S. 12]
- SI 1980/150 Industrial Training Levy (Petroleum) Order 1980
- SI 1980/151
- SI 1980/152
- SI 1980/153 Heathrow Airport–London Noise Insulation Grants Scheme 1980
- SI 1980/154 Gatwick Airport—London Noise Insulation Grants Scheme 1980
- SI 1980/155
- SI 1980/156
- SI 1980/157
- SI 1980/158
- SI 1980/159
- SI 1980/160 Misuse of Drugs (Licence Fees) (Amendment) Regulations 1980
- SI 1980/161
- SI 1980/162
- SI 1980/163
- SI 1980/164
- SI 1980/165
- SI 1980/166
- SI 1980/167
- SI 1980/168 Measuring Instruments (EEC Requirements) (Fees) (Amendment) Regulations 1980
- SI 1980/169 Removal and Disposal of Vehicles (Amendment) Regulations 1980
- SI 1980/170 Water Authorities and National Water Council (Limit for Borrowing) Order 1980
- SI 1980/171
- SI 1980/172
- SI 1980/173
- SI 1980/174 Town and Country Planning Act 1971 (Commencement No. 58) (South East Dorset) Order 1980 [C. 7]
- SI 1980/175 Town and Country Planning (Repeal of Provisions No. 30) (South East Dorset) Order 1980
- SI 1980/176
- SI 1980/177
- SI 1980/178 Church Representation Rules (Amendment) Resolution 1980
- SI 1980/179 Industrial Training Levy (Rubber and Plastics Processing Industry) Order 1980
- SI 1980/180 Motor Vehicles (Driving Licences) (Amendment) Regulations 1980
- SI 1980/181 District of North Devon (Electoral Arrangements) Order 1980
- SI 1980/182 Car Tax (Isle of Man) Order 1980
- SI 1980/183 Value Added Tax (Isle of Man) Order 1980
- SI 1980/184 Continental Shelf (Jurisdiction) Order 1980
- SI 1980/185 Argentine Republic (Extradition) (Amendment) Order 1980
- SI 1980/186 Foreign Compensation (Financial Provisions) Order 1980
- SI 1980/187 INMARSAT (Immunities and Privileges) Order 1980
- SI 1980/188 Civil Aviation Act 1971 (Isle of Man) (Amendment) Order 1980
- SI 1980/189 Independent Broadcasting Authority Act 1979 (Channel Islands) Order 1980
- SI 1980/190 Theatres (Northern Ireland) Order 1980 [N.I. 1]
- SI 1980/191 European Communities (Definition of Treaties) (Multilateral Trade Negotiations) Order 1980
- SI 1980/192 Fiduciary Note Issue (Extension of Period) Order 1980
- SI 1980/193 Local Government (Allowances) (Amendment) Regulations 1980
- SI 1980/194
- SI 1980/195
- SI 1980/196 Borough of Brighton (Electoral Arrangements) Order 1980
- SI 1980/197 British Nationality (Amendment) Regulations 1980
- SI 1980/198 Local Government Superannuation (Scotland) Amendment Regulations 1980 [S. 16]
- SI 1980/199
- SI 1980/200

== 201–300 ==
- SI 1980/201
- SI 1980/202
- SI 1980/203
- SI 1980/204
- SI 1980/205
- SI 1980/206
- SI 1980/207
- SI 1980/208 Health and Safety at Work etc. Act 1974 (Commencement No. 5) Order 1980 [C. 8]
- SI 1980/209 City of Aberdeen District (Electoral Arrangements) Order 1980
- SI 1980/210 Kirkcaldy District (Electoral Arrangements) Order 1980
- SI 1980/211 Agricultural Levy Reliefs (Frozen Beef and Veal) Order 1980
- SI 1980/212
- SI 1980/213
- SI 1980/214 Industrial Training Levy (Wool, Jute and Flax) Order 1980
- SI 1980/215
- SI 1980/216 Local Government Superannuation (Amendment) Regulations 1980
- SI 1980/217
- SI 1980/218
- SI 1980/219
- SI 1980/220
- SI 1980/221 Trade Marks (Amendment) Rules 1980
- SI 1980/222 Motor Vehicles (Type Approval) (Great Britain) (Fees) Regulations 1980
- SI 1980/223 Motor Vehicles (Type Approval and Approval Marks) (Fees) Regulations 1980
- SI 1980/224
- SI 1980/225 The Cycle Racing on Highways (Special Authorisation) (England and Wales) Regulations 1980
- SI 1980/226
- SI 1980/227
- SI 1980/228
- SI 1980/229 The Water Authorities (Collection of Charges) Order 1980
- SI 1980/230 The Industrial Training Levy (Air Transport and Travel) Order 1980
- SI 1980/231 The District of Redditch (Electoral Arrangements) Order 1980
- SI 1980/232 The Banff and Buchan District (Electoral Arrangements) Order 1980
- SI 1980/233 The Local Government Superannuation (Amendment) (No. 2) Regulations 1980
- SI 1980/234 The Local Government Superannuation (Amendment) (No. 3) Regulations 1980
- SI 1980/235 The Development Board for Rural Wales (Financial Limit) Order 1980
- SI 1980/236
- SI 1980/237
- SI 1980/238
- SI 1980/239
- SI 1980/240
- SI 1980/241 Marriage Fees (Scotland) Regulations 1980 [S. 17]
- SI 1980/242 Registration of Births, Deaths and Marriages (Fees) (Scotland) Order 1980 [S. 18]
- SI 1980/243 Southern Rhodesia (Constitution of Zimbabwe) (Elections and Appointments) (Amendment) Order 1980
- SI 1980/244 Registration of Births, Deaths and Marriages (Fees) (Scotland) Regulations 1980 [S. 19]
- SI 1980/245 Customs Duties (Quota Relief) Order 1980
- SI 1980/246 Weights and Measures (Milk and Solid Fuel Vending Machines) Regulations 1980
- SI 1980/247 The Remuneration of Teachers (Further Education) Order 1980
- SI 1980/248
- SI 1980/249 The Ironstone Restoration Fund (Rates of Contribution) Order 1980
- SI 1980/250 The Ironstone Restoration Fund (Standard Rate) Order 1980
- SI 1980/251 The Continental Shelf (Protection of Installations) Order 1980
- SI 1980/252
- SI 1980/253
- SI 1980/254 The Industrial Training Levy (Iron and Steel) Order 1980
- SI 1980/255 The Industrial Training Levy (Distributive Board) Order 1980
- SI 1980/256
- SI 1980/257 The Sugar Beet (Research and Education) Order 1980
- SI 1980/258 The Roxburgh District (Electoral Arrangements) Order 1980
- SI 1980/259
- SI 1980/260
- SI 1980/261
- SI 1980/262
- SI 1980/263 Medicines (Chloroform Prohibition) Amendment Order 1980
- SI 1980/264 National Health Service (Charges for Drugs and Appliances) Amendment Regulations 1980
- SI 1980/265 Registration of Births, Deaths and Marriages (Fees) Order 1980
- SI 1980/266 Community Road Transport Rules (Exemptions) (Amendment) Regulations 1980
- SI 1980/267 Valuation Timetable (Scotland) Amendment Order 1980 [S. 21]
- SI 1980/268 Community Service by Offenders (Scotland) Act 1978 (Commencement No. 2) Order 1980 [C. 9] [S. 22]
- SI 1980/269 Health and Safety at Work etc. Act 1974 (Commencement No. 6) Order 1980 [C. 10] [S. 23]
- SI 1980/270 Merchant Shipping (Fees) Regulations 1980
- SI 1980/271 Gedling (Parishes) Order 1980
- SI 1980/272 Police Pensions (Amendment) (No. 2) Regulations 1980
- SI 1980/273 Firemen's Pension Scheme (Amendment) Order 1980
- SI 1980/274
- SI 1980/275
- SI 1980/276
- SI 1980/277
- SI 1980/278
- SI 1980/279 Anti-Dumping Duty (Revocation) Order 1980
- SI 1980/280 Merchant Shipping (Sterling Equivalents) (Various Enactments) Order 1980
- SI 1980/281 Carriage by Air (Sterling Equivalents) Order 1980
- SI 1980/282 Merchant Shipping (Tonnage) (Amendment) Regulations 1980
- SI 1980/283 Medicines (Exemptions from Restrictions on the Retail Sale or Supply of Veterinary Drugs) (Amendment) Order 1980
- SI 1980/284
- SI 1980/285
- SI 1980/286 Building (Prescribed Fees) Regulations 1980
- SI 1980/287 Motor Vehicles (Construction and Use) (Amendment) (No. 3) Regulations 1980
- SI 1980/288 Occupational Pension Schemes (Public Service Pension Schemes) (Amendment) Regulations 1980
- SI 1980/289 Chloroform in Food (Scotland) Regulations 1980
- SI 1980/290 Act of Sederunt (Rules of Court Amendment No. 1) (Adoption Proceedings) 1980 [S. 26]
- SI 1980/291 Act of Sederunt (Reciprocal Enforcement of Maintenance Orders) (Hague Convention Countries) 1980 [S. 27]
- SI 1980/292 Industrial Training Levy (Knitting, Lace and Net) Order 1980
- SI 1980/293
- SI 1980/294
- SI 1980/295 Road Traffic Accidents (Payments for Treatment) (Scotland) Order 1980
- SI 1980/296 National Health Service (Charges for Drugs and Appliances) (Scotland) Amendment Regulations 1980
- SI 1980/297 City of Bristol (Electoral Arrangements) Order 1980
- SI 1980/298 Amusements with Prizes (Variation of Fees) Order 1980
- SI 1980/299 Gaming Act (Variation of Fees) Order 1980
- SI 1980/300 Town and Country Planning Act 1971 (Commencement No. 59) (Salop) Order 1980 [C. 11]

== 301–400 ==
- Parish of Newark Order 1980 (SI 1980/302)
- Seeds (National Lists of Varieties) (Fees) Regulations 1980 (SI 1980/330)
- Borough of North Tyneside (Electoral Arrangements) Order 1980 (SI 1980/339)
- West Derbyshire (Parishes) Order 1980 (SI 1980/363)
- Lichfield (Parishes) Order 1980 (SI 1980/387)
- County Courts (Northern Ireland) Order 1980 (SI 1980/397) (N.I. 3)

== 401–500 ==
- The City of Wakefield (Electoral Arrangements) Order 1980 S.I. 1980/408
- The Lancaster (Parishes) Order 1980 S.I. 1980/415
- Import and Export (Plant Health) (Great Britain) Order 1980 S.I. 1980/420
- The District of South Bucks (Electoral Arrangements) Order 1980 S.I. 1980/428
- The Borough of Slough (Electoral Arrangements) Order 1980 S.I. 1980/429
- The Borough of South Tyneside (Electoral Arrangements) Order 1980 S.I. 1980/430
- The Borough of Dudley (Electoral Arrangements) Order 1980 S.I. 1980/447

== 501–600 ==
- The Borough of Tewkesbury (Electoral Arrangements) Order 1980 S.I. 1980/516
- Merchant Shipping (Radio Installations) Regulations 1980 S.I. 1980/529
- Merchant Shipping (Navigational Equipment) Regulations 1980 S.I. 1980/530
- Merchant Shipping (Passenger Ship Construction) Regulations 1980 S.I. 1980/535
- Merchant Shipping (Life-Saving Appliances) Regulations 1980 S.I. 1980/538
- Merchant Shipping (Closing of Openings in Hulls and Watertight Bulkheads) Regulations 1980 S.I. 1980/540
- Merchant Shipping (Musters) Regulations 1980 S.I. 1980/542
- Merchant Shipping (Pilot Ladders and Hoists) Regulations 1980 S.I. 1980/543
- Merchant Shipping (Fire Appliances) Regulations 1980 S.I. 1980/544
- Bankruptcy Amendment (Northern Ireland) Order 1980 S.I. 1980/561 (N.I. 4)
- Domestic Proceedings (Northern Ireland) Order 1980 S.I. 1980/563 (N.I. 5)
- The District of Rother (Electoral Arrangements) Order 1980 S.I. 1980/581
- Industrial Training (Transfer of the Activities of Establishments) Order 1980 S.I. 1980/586
- The City of Birmingham (Electoral Arrangements) Order 1980 S.I. 1980/594
- The Moray District (Electoral Arrangements) Order 1980 S.I. 1980/599

== 601–700 ==
- District of West Dorset (Electoral Arrangements) Order 1980 (SI 1980/643)
- District of Arun (Electoral Arrangements) Order 1980 (SI 1980/652)
- District of Mid Sussex (Electoral Arrangements) Order 1980 (SI 1980/653)
- Legal Aid in Criminal Proceedings (General) (Amendment) Regulations 1980 (SI 1980/661)
- Beddgelert Siding Light Railway Order 1980 (SI 1980/667)
- Brecon Mountain Railway (Light Railway) Order 1980 (SI 1980/671)
- Merchant Shipping (Code of Safe Working Practices) Regulations 1980 (SI 1980/686)

== 701–800 ==
- Criminal Justice (Northern Ireland) Order 1980 S.I. 1980/704 (N.I. 9)
- The London Borough of Enfield (Electoral Arrangements) Order 1980 S.I. 1980/732
- The Royal Borough of Windsor and Maidenhead (Electoral Arrangements) Order 1980 S.I. 1980/733
- The County of Northumberland (Electoral Arrangements) Order 1980 S.I. 1980/738
- The District of Suffolk Coastal (Electoral Arrangements) Order 1980 S.I. 1980/739
- The Borough of Sunderland (Electoral Arrangements) Order 1980 S.I. 1980/756
- The District of Caradon (Electoral Arrangements) Order 1980 S.I. 1980/757
- Customs and Excise (Community Transit) Regulations 1980 S.I. 1980/762
- Motorcycles (Sound Level Measurement Certificates) Regulations 1980 S.I. 1980/765
- The Borough of Charnwood (Electoral Arrangements) Order 1980 S.I. 1980/777
- The District of North West Leicestershire (Electoral Arrangements) Order 1980 S.I. 1980/778
- The District of Waveney (Electoral Arrangements) Order 1980 S.I. 1980/795

== 801–900 ==
- The District of Wycombe (Electoral Arrangements) Order 1980 (SI 1980/842)
- Bees (Northern Ireland) Order 1980 (SI 1980/869) (N.I. 7)
- Social Security (Northern Ireland) Order 1980 (SI 1980/870) (N.I. 8)

== 901–1000 ==
- Education (Areas to which Pupils belong) Regulations 1980 (SI 1980/917)
- Customs and Excise (Community Transit) Regulations 1980 (SI 1980/980)

== 1001–1100 ==
- The City of Newcastle upon Tyne (Electoral Arrangements) Order 1980 S.I. 1980/1054
- Measuring Instruments (EEC Requirements) Regulations 1980 S.I. 1980/1058
- The Borough of Gateshead (Electoral Arrangements) Order 1980 S.I. 1980/1069
- Treatment of Offenders (Northern Ireland) Order 1980 S.I. 1980/1084 (N.I. 10)
- Roads (Northern Ireland) Order 1980 S.I. 1980/1085 (N.I. 11)
- Private Streets (Northern Ireland) Order 1980 S.I. 1980/1086 (N.I. 12)
- Carriage of Passengers and their Luggage by Sea (Interim Provisions) Order 1980 S.I. 1980/1092

== 1101–1200 ==
- Price Marking (Petrol) Order 1980 S.I. 1980/1121
- The District of Wimborne (Electoral Arrangements) Order 1980 S.I. 1980/1128
- The Eastwood District (Electoral Arrangements) Order 1980 S.I. 1980/1132
- Motor Vehicles (Type Approval) Regulations 1980 S.I. 1980/1182
- The City of Dundee District (Electoral Arrangements) Order 1980 S.I. 1980/1196

== 1201–1300 ==
- National Health Service (General Dental Services) (Scotland) Amendment Regulations 1980 S.I. 1980/1220
- Control of Lead at Work Regulations 1980 S.I. 1980/1248
- The Parish of Congleton Order 1980 S.I. 1980/1285
- The County of Shropshire (Electoral Arrangements) Order 1980 S.I. 1980/1297
- Agriculture and Horticulture Development Regulations 1980 S.I. 1980/1298

== 1301–1400 ==
- Pensions Increase (Review) Order 1980 S.I. 1980/1302
- The Ross and Cromarty District (Electoral Arrangements) Order 1980 S.I. 1980/1318
- Secure Tenancies (Notices) Regulations 1980 S.I. 1980/1339
- The District of East Cambridgeshire (Electoral Arrangements) Order 1980 S.I. 1980/1340
- The District of Blaby (Electoral Arrangements) Order 1980 S.I. 1980/1341
- The District of South Oxfordshire (Electoral Arrangements) Order 1980 S.I. 1980/1343
- The County of Nottinghamshire (Electoral Arrangements) Order 1980 S.I. 1980/1344

== 1401–1500 ==
- The Borough of Knowsley (Electoral Arrangements) Order 1980 S.I. 1980/1402
- Family Income Supplements (General) Regulations 1980 S.I. 1980/1437
- Family Income Supplements (Claims and Payments) Regulations 1980 S.I. 1980/1438
- The Borough of Kirklees (Electoral Arrangements) Order 1980 S.I. 1980/1463
- The District of North Dorset (Electoral Arrangements) Order 1980 S.I. 1980/1487

== 1501–1600 ==
- National Health Service (Charges for Drugs and Appliances) Regulations 1980 S.I. 1980/1503
- The North Wiltshire and Thamesdown (Areas) Order 1980 S.I. 1980/1558
- The County of Isle of Wight (Electoral Arrangements) Order 1980 S.I. 1980/1572
- Supplementary Benefit (Duplication and Overpayment) Regulations 1980 S.I. 1980/1580

== 1601–1700 ==
- Police Pensions (Amendment) (No. 3) Regulations 1980 (SI 1980/1616)
- Legal Aid (Assessment of Resources) Regulations 1980 (SI. 1980/1630)
- Supplementary Benefit (Trade Disputes and Recovery from Earnings) Regulations 1980 (SI 1980/1641)
- Supplementary Benefit (Determination of Questions) Regulations 1980 (SI 1980/1643)
- Legal Aid in Criminal Proceedings (General) (Amendment No. 2) Regulations 1980 (SI 1980/1651)
- Cowes and Newport Light Railway Order 1980 (SI 1980/1660)
- National Health Service (Charges for Drugs and Appliances) (Scotland) Regulations 1980 (SI 1980/1674)
- Angus District (Electoral Arrangements) Order 1980 (SI 1980/1680)
- Monklands District (Electoral Arrangements) Order 1980 (SI 1980/1681)
- Rent Act 1977 (Forms etc.) Regulations 1980 (SI 1980/1697)

== 1701–1800 ==
- The County of Staffordshire (Electoral Arrangements) Order 1980 S.I. 1980/1702
- Control of Pollution (Special Waste) Regulations 1980 S.I. 1980/1709
- The County of Somerset (Electoral Arrangements) Order 1980 S.I. 1980/1725
- Industrial Training (Transfer of the Activities of Establishments) (No. 2) Order 1980 S.I. 1980/1753
- The County of Hertfordshire (Electoral Arrangements) Order 1980 S.I. 1980/1769
- Legal Aid (Scotland) (General) Amendment Regulations 1980 S.I. 1980/1791
- Legal Advice and Assistance (Scotland) Amendment Regulations 1980 S.I. 1980/1792
- Legal Aid (Scotland) (Assessment of Resources) Regulations 1980 S.I. 1980/1793

== 1801–1900 ==
- The County of Cheshire (Electoral Arrangements) Order 1980 S.I. 1980/1805
- The Lochaber District (Electoral Arrangements) Order 1980 S.I. 1980/1827
- The County of Lincolnshire (Electoral Arrangements) Order 1980 S.I. 1980/1829
- The County of Surrey (Electoral Arrangements) Order 1980 S.I. 1980/1830
- Wireless Telegraphy (Exemption) Regulations 1980 S.I. 1980/1848
- Food Labelling Regulations 1980 S.I. 1980/1849
- Supreme Court Funds (Amendment) Rules 1980 S.I. 1980/1858
- The North Wolds (Parishes) Order 1980 S.I. 1980/1876
- Legal Aid (General) Regulations 1980 S.I. 1980/1894
- Legal Advice and Assistance Regulations (No. 2) 1980 S.I. 1980/1898

== 1901–2000 ==
- Oxfordshire and Wiltshire (Areas) Order 1980 (SI 1980/1919)
- Manchester and Trafford (Areas) Order 1980 (SI 1980/1920)
- Great Gaddesden (Areas) Order 1980 (SI 1980/1939)
- Financial Provisions (Northern Ireland) Order 1980 (SI 1980/1959 (N.I. 17))
- County of Derbyshire (Electoral Arrangements) Order 1980 (SI 1980/1985)
- Newcastle Emlyn Branch Light Railway Order 1980 (SI 1980/1969)
- Administration of Justice Act 1977 (Commencement No. 7) Order 1980 (SI 1980/1981)

== 2000– ==
- Torts (Interference with Goods) Act 1977 (Commencement No. 3) Order 1980 (SI 1980/2024)

== See also ==
- List of statutory instruments of the United Kingdom
