= Pilotage Act 1913 =

Act of the Parliament of the United Kingdom

Pilotage Act 1913 (Note: Section 62.)
- Act of Parliament
- Parliament of the United Kingdom
- Long title: An Act to consolidate and amend the Law relating to Pilotage.
- Citation: 2 & 3 Geo. 5 c. 31
- Territorial extent: United Kingdom; Isle of Man; (Note: Section 61.)

Dates
- Royal assent: 7 March 1913
- Commencement: 1 April 1913 (Note: Section 59.)
- Repealed: United Kingdom: 9 August 1983; Isle of Man: 2 May 1986
Other legislation
Amends	See § Repealed enactments
Repeals/revokes	See § Repealed enactments
Amended by	Statute Law (Repeals) Act 1975
Repealed by	United Kingdom: Pilotage Act 1983; Isle of Man: Statute Law (Repeals) Act 1986

Status: Repealed

Text of statute as originally enacted

The Pilotage Act 1913 (2 & 3 Geo. 5 c. 31) was an act of the Parliament of the United Kingdom that consolidated enactments related to pilotage in the United Kingdom.

== Provisions ==
=== Repealed enactments ===
Section 60(1) of the act repealed 3 enactments, listed in the second schedule to the act.

Citation	Short title	Extent of repeal
57 & 58 Vict. c. 60	Merchant Shipping Act 1894	Sections 572 to 632 inclusive, and the twenty-first schedule.
60 & 61 Vict. c. 61	Merchant Shipping (Exemption from Pilotage) Act 1897	The whole act.
6 Edw. 7. c. 48	Merchant Shipping Act 1906	Section 73.

== Subsequent developments ==
The whole act was repealed for the United Kingdom by section 69(3) of, and schedule 4 to, the Pilotage Act 1983 (c. 21), which came into force on 9 August 1983.

The whole act was repealed for the Isle of Man by section 1(1) of, and part XI of schedule 1 to, the Statute Law (Repeals) Act 1986, which came into force on 2 May 1986.
