= Timeline of the oil and gas industry in the United Kingdom =

The Timeline of the oil and gas industry in the United Kingdom is a selection of significant events in the history of the oil and gas sector in the United Kingdom.

Timeline of the UK oil and gas industry
Year	Event
1694	Patent No. 405 granted for a process to extract pitch, tar and oil from oil stone
1716	Patent to extract pitch, tar and oil from stone extracted from Shropshire coalmines
1786	A spring of bitumen found in a tunnel at Ironbridge, Shropshire
1812	Gas Light and Coke Company established
1836	Gas found when digging a well for water at Hawkhurst Sussex, gas ignited and killed two men
1843	Manchester Corporation becomes the first municipal gas undertaking
1847	Gasworks Clauses Act 1847 (10 & 11 Vict. c. 15) defines rights and obligations of undertakings
1848	James Oakes and James Young formed a partnership to produce paraffin oil for lamps from crude oil in mine workings
1859	Sale of Gas Act 1859 (22 & 23 Vict. c. 66)
1860	Metropolis Gas Act 1860 (23 & 24 Vict. c. 125)
1860	Sale of Gas Act 1860 (23 & 24 Vict. c. 146)
1861	Oil shipped from Pennsylvania to London, the first recorded transnational shipment
1862	Petroleum Act 1862 (25 & 26 Vict. c. 66) to ensure the safe-keeping of petroleum and its products
1864	Sale of Gas (Scotland) Act 1864 (27 & 28 Vict. c. 96)
1868	Petroleum Act 1868 (31 & 32 Vict. c. 56) extends the Petroleum Act 1862 to include labelling and flammability tests
1870	Beckton gas works opened, eventually the largest in the world
1870	Gas and Water Works Facilities Act 1870 (33 & 34 Vict. c. 70)
1871	Archibald Cochrane patented a method to extract hydrocarbons from pit coal
1871	Petroleum Act 1871 (34 & 35 Vict. c. 105) required harbour authorities to make bye-laws regulating the trade in petroleum, repealed the Petroleum Acts 1862 and 1868
1871	Gasworks Clauses Act 1871 (34 & 35 Vict. c. 41) amends the 1847 act
1872	Culross Abbey lit by gas produced from tar
1873	Gas and Water Works Facilities Act 1870 Amendment Act 1873 (36 & 37 Vict. c. 89)
1876	Burghs Gas Supply (Scotland) Act 1876 (39 & 40 Vict. c. 49)
1879	Petroleum Act 1879 (42 & 43 Vict. c. 47) redefined petroleum flash point from 100 °F to 73 °F
1893	Burghs Gas Supply (Scotland) Act 1893 (56 & 57 Vict. c. 52)
1899	First edition of The Petroleum Industrial Technical Review by the Petroleum Storage Tanks and Transportation Co. Ltd.
1916	The Gas (Standard of Calorific Power) Act 1916 (6 & 7 Geo. 5. c. 25) allowed undertakings to change from illuminating power to calorific value for sales
1918	Burghs Gas Supply (Scotland) Amendment Act 1918 (8 & 9 Geo. 5. c. 45)
1918	Petroleum (Production) Act 1918 (8 & 9 Geo. 5. c. 52), conferred on landowners the ownership of minerals on their land
1919	Britain's first oil discovery at Hardscroft, Derbyshire, produced 29,000 barrels between 1919 and 1945
1920	The Gas Regulation Act 1920 (10 & 11 Geo. 5. c. 28) changed the basis of charging for gas from its illuminating power, as specified by example in the Gasworks Clauses Act 1871, to its calorific value (or heating power) of the gas.
1925	Statutory Gas Companies (Electricity Supply Powers) Act 1925 (15 & 16 Geo. 5. c. 44)
1926	Petroleum Act 1926 (16 & 17 Geo. 5. c. 25) updated Petroleum Acts 1871 and 1879 to reflect changes of use of petroleum
1928	London Research Centre opened to study manufacture and distribution of gas
1928	Petroleum (Consolidation) Act 1928 (18 & 19 Geo. 5. c. 32), and Petroleum (Amendment) Act 1928 (18 & 19 Geo. 5. c. 20) petroleum-spirit not to be kept without a licence, transport of petroleum, keeping, use and supply of petroleum-spirit
1929	Gas Undertakings Act 1929 (19 & 20 Geo. 5. c. 24)
1932	Gas Undertakings Act 1932 (22 & 23 Geo. 5. c. 40)
1934	Petroleum (Production) Act 1934 (24 & 25 Geo. 5. c. 36), vested in the Crown the petroleum and natural gas within Great Britain and made provision for the searching and getting of petroleum and natural gas
1934	Gas Undertakings Act 1934 (24 & 25 Geo. 5. c. 28)
1936	First deep oil well at Portsdown Hampshire by D’Arcy Exploration Co. Ltd.
1936	Petroleum (Transfer of Licences) Act 1936 (26 Geo. 5 & 1 Edw. 8. c. 27)
1937	Gas found at Eskdale Yorkshire by D'Arcy Exploration Co. Ltd.
1937	Gas found at Dalkeith Scotland by D'Arcy Exploration Co. Ltd.
1939	Oil found at Formby Lancashire
1939	Oil found at Earking, Nottinghamshire by D'Arcy Exploration Co. Ltd.
1939	Petroleum Board established to manage petroleum supplies under war conditions
1941	Oil found at Dukes Wood, Nottinghamshire by D'Arcy Exploration Co. Ltd.
1941	Oil found at Kelham Hills, Nottinghamshire by D'Arcy Exploration Co. Ltd.
1941	Heysham refinery commissioned to produce high octane fuel for combat aircraft
1943	Oil found at Caunton Nottinghamshire by D'Arcy Exploration Co. Ltd.
1943	Oil found at Nocton, Lincolnshire by D'Arcy Exploration Co. Ltd.
1948	Gas Act 1948 (11 & 12 Geo. 6. c. 67) nationalised the UK gas industry with effect from 1 May 1949, established 12 area boards and the Gas Council
1954	Rights of Entry (Gas and Electricity Boards) Act 1954 (2 & 3 Eliz. 2. c. 21)
1956	Nationalisation of the Suez Canal by Egypt, Suez crisis
1959	Oil discovered at Kimmeridge, Dorset by BP
1959	First trans-national shipment of liquefied natural gas, landed at Canvey Island from USA
1963	Electricity and Gas Act 1963 (c. 59)
1964	Oil discovered at Wareham, Dorset by BP
1964	First shipment of Liquefied Natural Gas, landed at Canvey Island from Algeria
1964	Continental Shelf Act 1964 (c. 29), made provision for the exploration and exploitation of the continental shelf, enacted provisions of the 1958 Geneva Convention on the High Seas
1965	Gas Act 1965 (c. 36), the Gas Council was given powers to manufacture or acquire gas and supply gas in bulk to Area Boards
1965	Gas found at the Lockton field in North Yorkshire by Home Oil Company of Canada
1965	Peak number of service station 41,000 in the UK
1965	Gas discovered at West Sole field by BP
1965	Sea Gem disaster, 13 fatalities
1967	First North Sea Gas arrived onshore at Easington terminal from West Sole field
1967	Torrey Canyon tanker disaster 60,000 tons of oil released
1968	Bacton gas terminal inaugurated
1968	Diesel and electric trains supersede steam trains in UK
1968	Gas and Electricity Act 1968 (c. 39) extended the powers of the Gas Council to borrow money
1970	First oil discovered in the UK sector of the North Sea, Forties Field
1971	Lockton gas field comes onstream
1971	Mineral Working (Offshore Installations) Act 1971 (c. 61), provided for the safety, health and welfare of persons on installations concerned with the underwater exploitation and exploration of oil and gas
1972	Gas Act 1972 (c. 60), merged the gas boards, abolished the Gas Council, established the British Gas Corporation
1972	Theddlethorpe terminal opened, gas feed from Viking field
1973	Gas Council discover Wytch Farm oil field
1973	The October or Yom Kippur war, Arab oil states reduce production and embargo supplies, OPEC set high prices precipitating an economic crisis
1974	Gas discovered at Morecambe Bay
1975	Petroleum Revenue Tax introduced by Oil Taxation Act 1975 (c. 22)
1975	First Oil production from the North Sea, Argyll Field by BP
1975	Offshore Petroleum Development (Scotland) Act 1975 (c. 8), the acquisition by the Secretary of State of land in Scotland for the exploration and exploitation of offshore petroleum
1975	Petroleum and Submarine Pipe-lines Act 1975 (c. 74), established the British National Oil Corporation; provisions about licences to search for and get petroleum and about submarine pipe-lines and refineries
1976	Shell Heysham refinery closed
1978	St. Fergus gas terminal opened
1979	Shah of Iran overthrown, the second 1970s oil crisis
1980	Petroleum Revenue Tax Act 1980 (c. 1), new provisions on petroleum revenue tax
1981	BP announces the closure of Kent Refinery
1981	Gas field discovered at Hatfield Moors, Yorkshire
1981	Oil field discovered at Humbly Grove, Hampshire by Carless Capel
1981	UK became a net exporter of oil
1981	Burmah Ellesmere port refinery closed
1981	Gas Levy Act 1981 (c. 3)
1982	Oil and Gas (Enterprise) Act 1982 (c. 23)
1983	Petroleum Royalties (Relief) Act 1983 (c. 59), conferred on petroleum production licence holders an exemption from royalties
1983	ExxonMobil Milford Haven refinery closed
1984	Shell Teesport Refinery closed
1984	Control of Industrial Major Accident Hazards Regulations 1984 introduced
1985	Gas field at Kirby Misperton discovered by Taylor Woodrow
1985	Oil and Pipelines Act 1985 (c. 62) abolishes the British National Oil Corporation, establishes the Oil and Pipelines Agency
1985	UK oil exports peaked
1986	Advance Petroleum Revenue Tax Act 1986 (c. 68), repayment of advance petroleum revenue tax
1986	Gas Act 1986 (c. 44), privatised the gas industry, established British Gas and Ofgas as regulator
1986	Fall in oil price
1987	Explosion at BP Refinery Grangemouth, one fatality
1987	Government shares in BP sold
1987	Petroleum Act 1987 (c. 12), provisions for the abandonment of offshore installations and submarine pipe-lines; amended the Petroleum (Production) Act 1934; amended the Petroleum and Submarine Pipe-lines Act 1975
1988	Piper Alpha disaster, 167 fatalities
1989	Petroleum Royalties (Relief) and Continental Shelf Act 1989 (c. 1), conferred on holders of petroleum licences an exemption from petroleum royalties from onshore and offshore fields and to conferred power to amend the Continental Shelf (Designation of Additional Areas) Order 1974
1990	Liberalisation of the gas market 'the dash for gas' power generators allowed to burn gas
1992	Offshore Safety Act 1992 (c. 15) comes into force
1993	UK (Scotland) to Ireland gas interconnector commissioned 24-inch
1993	Gas (Exempt Supplies) Act 1993 (c. 1)
1994	Explosion and Fire at Texaco Milford Haven refinery
1995	Shell intended to sink redundant Brent Spar in deep water, Greenpeace occupy the Spar
1995	Gas Act 1995 (c. 45), amended parts of the Gas Act 1986; made provision for owners of certain gas processing facilities to make them available to other persons
1997	UK became a net exporter of gas
1998	Petroleum Act 1998 (c. 17), consolidated enactments about petroleum, offshore installations and submarine pipelines
1998	Interconnector Bacton to Zeebrugge commissioned
1999	Peak of UK oil production
1999	Shell close Shell Haven oil refinery
1999	Control of Major Accident Hazards (COMAH) Regulations came into force
2003	UK to Ireland gas interconnector 2, with a 10-inch branch to the Isle of Man commissioned
2004	UK became a net importer of gas
2005	Buncefield explosions and fire at oil terminal in Hertfordshire
2006	BBL pipeline (Balgzand - Bacton Line) commissioned
2007	Oil & Gas UK established
2007	Peak of UK petrol sales
2011	Explosion and fire at Chevron Pembroke refinery
2011	Petroplus Teesside refinery closed
2011	Peak of UK diesel sales
2012	Closure of Petroplus Coryton oil refinery
2014	Nynas Dundee refinery closes
2015	Control of Major Accident Hazards (COMAH) Regulations 2015 replace COMAH 1999
2018	Closure of Theddlethorpe gas terminal
2018	Domestic Gas and Electricity (Tariff Cap) Act 2018 (c. 21)

== See also ==
- Gas Act
