= List of acts of the Parliament of the United Kingdom from 1982 =

This is a list of acts of the Parliament of the United Kingdom passed in 1982.

Acts passed since 1963 are cited by calendar year, as opposed to the convention used for earlier acts of citing the regnal year(s) in which the relevant parliamentary session was held. Each act passed in a respective year is given a chapter number (abbreviated "c."), denoted by Arabic numerals in the case of public general acts, lowercase Roman numerals in the case of local acts, or italicised Arabic numerals in the case of personal acts. These run as separate series.

86 acts of Parliament were passed in 1982: 57 public general acts, 27 local acts and 2 personal acts.

indicates that an act has been transcribed on Wikisource, indicates that an act is available to view at legislation.gov.uk, and indicates the location of the original act in the Parliamentary Archives.

== Public general acts ==
Short title	Citation	Royal assent
Long title
Civil Aviation (Amendment) Act 1982 (repealed)	1982 c. 1	2 February 1982
An Act to make further provision with respect to the financial limits applying to the British Airports Authority and the British Airways Board; and to make amendments designed to facilitate, or otherwise desirable in connection with, the consolidation of certain enactments relating to civil aviation. (Repealed by Statute Law (Repeals) Act 2004 (c. 14))
Social Security (Contributions) Act 1982 (repealed)	1982 c. 2	2 February 1982
An Act to make provision in connection with certain contributions payable under the Social Security Act 1975. (Note: Social Security Act 1975 (c. 14)) (Repealed by Social Security (Consequential Provisions) Act 1992 (c. 6))
Currency Act 1982	1982 c. 3	2 February 1982
An Act to replace section 1(1) of the Decimal Currency Act 1967 (Note: Decimal Currency Act 1967 (c. 47)) so as to sanction references to the new penny as the penny.
Shipbuilding Act 1982 (repealed)	1982 c. 4	25 February 1982
An Act to raise the limits imposed by section 11 of the Aircraft and Shipbuilding Industries Act 1977 (Note: Aircraft and Shipbuilding Industries Act 1977 (c. 3)) in relation to the finances of British Shipbuilders and its wholly owned subsidiaries; and to provide for extending the period in relation to which schemes under the Shipbuilding (Redundancy Payments) Act 1978 (Note: Shipbuilding (Redundancy Payments) Act 1978 (c. 11)) operate. (Repealed by Statute Law (Repeals) Act 1993 (c. 50))
Hops Marketing Act 1982 (repealed)	1982 c. 5	25 February 1982
An Act to revoke the Hops Marketing Scheme 1932, to make provision with respect to the forward contracts and other property, rights and liabilities of the Hops Marketing Board and to provide for the dissolution or winding up of that Board. (Repealed by Statute Law (Repeals) Act 2004 (c. 14))
Transport (Finance) Act 1982	1982 c. 6	25 February 1982
An Act to increase certain limits relating to the indebtedness of the British Railways Board and the National Bus Company, to the amount of compensation payable in respect of certain public service obligations of the Board, and to the amount of certain financial assistance given to the Port of London Authority and the Mersey Docks and Harbour Company; and to enable the Treasury to guarantee the discharge of the Board's liabilities to the European Company for the Financing of Railroad Rolling Stock.
New Towns Act 1982	1982 c. 7	25 February 1982
An Act to increase the limit imposed by section 60 of the New Towns Act 1981 (Note: New Towns Act 1981 (c. 64)) on the amounts which may be borrowed by development corporations and the Commission for the New Towns.
Consolidated Fund Act 1982	1982 c. 8	22 March 1982
An Act to apply certain sums out of the Consolidated Fund to the service of the years ending on 31st March 1981 and 1982.
Agricultural Training Board Act 1982 (repealed)	1982 c. 9	29 March 1982
An Act to consolidate the law relating to the Agricultural Training Board. (Repealed by Statute Law (Repeals) Act 2004 (c. 14))
Industrial Training Act 1982	1982 c. 10	29 March 1982
An Act to consolidate the law relating to industrial training boards.
Canada Act 1982	1982 c. 11	29 March 1982
An Act to give effect to a request by the Senate and House of Commons of Canada.
Travel Concessions (London) Act 1982	1982 c. 12	29 March 1982
An Act to confer on the Greater London Council the same powers in respect of travel concessions as those exercisable by the councils of London boroughs and the Common Council of the City of London.
Fire Service College Board (Abolition) Act 1982 (repealed)	1982 c. 13	7 April 1982
An Act to repeal section 23(2) of the Fire Services Act 1947, (Note: Fire Services Act 1947 (10 & 11 Geo. 6. c. 41)) to abolish the Fire Service College Board established thereunder and for connected purposes. (Repealed by Statute Law (Repeals) Act 1986 (c. 12))
Reserve Forces Act 1982 (repealed)	1982 c. 14	7 April 1982
An Act to change the name of the Territorial and Army Volunteer Reserve and to amend the Reserve Forces Act 1980. (Note: Reserve Forces Act 1980 (c. 9)) (Repealed by Reserve Forces Act 1996 (c. 14))
Coal Industry Act 1982	1982 c. 15	7 April 1982
An Act to increase the limit on the borrowing powers of the National Coal Board; and to make further provision with respect to grants and payments by the Secretary of State in connection with the coal industry.
Civil Aviation Act 1982	1982 c. 16	27 May 1982
An Act to consolidate certain enactments relating to civil aviation.
Harbours (Scotland) Act 1982	1982 c. 17	27 May 1982
An Act to make provision for Scotland for establishing harbour trusts to hold, manage and maintain harbours and for the transfer of harbours held and maintained by the Secretary of State to such trusts; and for connected purposes.
Industry Act 1982	1982 c. 18	27 May 1982
An Act to raise the limits imposed on the Secretary of State's financial assistance to industry under section 8(7) and (8) of the Industry Act 1972. (Note: Industry Act 1972 (c. 63))
Deer (Amendment) (Scotland) Act 1982 (repealed)	1982 c. 19	28 June 1982
An Act to amend the Deer (Scotland) Act 1959 (Note: Deer (Scotland) Act 1959 (7 & 8 Eliz. 2. c. 40)) and certain related enactments. (Repealed by Deer (Scotland) Act 1996 (c. 58))
Children's Homes Act 1982 (repealed)	1982 c. 20	28 June 1982
An Act to provide for the registration, inspection and conduct of certain homes and other institutions for the accommodation of children in the care of local authorities; and for connected purposes. (Repealed by Children Act 1989 (c. 41))
Planning Inquiries (Attendance of Public) Act 1982 (repealed)	1982 c. 21	28 June 1982
An Act to require that evidence at planning inquiries held under the Town and Country Planning Act 1971 (Note: Town and Country Planning Act 1971 (c. 78)) be given in public, subject to certain exceptions. (Repealed by Planning (Consequential Provisions) Act 1990 (c. 11))
Gaming (Amendment) Act 1982 (repealed)	1982 c. 22	28 June 1982
An Act to amend the law with respect to the times of year at which applications may be made relating to the licensing of premises or the registration of clubs or institutes under section 10 of the Gaming Act 1845 (Note: Gaming Act 1845 (8 & 9 Vict. c. 109)) or Part II of the Gaming Act 1968 (Note: Gaming Act 1968 (c. 65)) and otherwise with respect to the procedure to be followed in connection with such applications; to empower the Secretary of State to make provision by order as to the fees payable in connection with licences under the said section 10; and to repeal certain spent or obsolete enactments relating to the matters aforesaid. (Repealed by Gambling Act 2005 (c. 19))
Oil and Gas (Enterprise) Act 1982	1982 c. 23	28 June 1982
An Act to make further provision with respect to the British National Oil Corporation; to abolish the National Oil Account; to make further provision with respect to the British Gas Corporation; to make provision for and in connection with the supply of gas through pipes by persons other than the Corporation; to amend the Petroleum (Production) Act 1934 (Note: Petroleum (Production) Act 1934 (24 & 25 Geo. 5. c. 36)) and to make further provision about licences to search for and get petroleum; to repeal and re-enact with amendments sections 2 and 3 of the Continental Shelf Act 1964; (Note: Continental Shelf Act 1964 (c. 29)) to extend the application of the Mineral Workings (Offshore Installations) Act 1971 (Note: Mineral Workings (Offshore Installations) Act 1971 (c. 61)) and the Offshore Petroleum Development (Scotland) Act 1975; (Note: Offshore Petroleum Development (Scotland) Act 1975 (c. 8)) to amend the Miscellaneous Financial Provisions Act 1968, (Note: Miscellaneous Financial Provisions Act 1968 (c. 75)) the Petroleum and Submarine Pipe-lines Act 1975 (Note: Petroleum and Submarine Pipe-lines Act 1975 (c. 74)) and the Participation Agreements Act 1978; (Note: Participation Agreements Act 1978 (c. 1)) and for connected purposes.
Social Security and Housing Benefits Act 1982	1982 c. 24	28 June 1982
An Act to make provision for the payment of statutory sick pay by employers; to make new provision with respect to the grant of, and the payment of subsidies in respect of, rate rebates, rent rebates and rent allowances; to amend the law relating to social security and war pensions; to amend section 44 of the National Assistance Act 1948; (Note: National Assistance Act 1948 (11 & 12 Geo. 6. c. 29)) and for connected purposes.
Iron and Steel Act 1982	1982 c. 25	13 July 1982
An Act to consolidate certain enactments relating to the British Steel Corporation and the iron and steel industry.
Food and Drugs (Amendment) Act 1982 (repealed)	1982 c. 26	13 July 1982
An Act to amend the Food and Drugs Act 1955 (Note: Food and Drugs Act 1955 (4 & 5 Eliz. 2. c. 16)) by altering certain penalties; by enabling offences to be tried on indictment as well as summarily; by extending in certain circumstances the time limits for prosecution; and for purposes connected therewith. (Repealed by Food Act 1984 (c. 30))
Civil Jurisdiction and Judgments Act 1982	1982 c. 27	13 July 1982
An Act to make further provision about the jurisdiction of courts and tribunals in the United Kingdom and certain other territories and about the recognition and enforcement of judgments given in the United Kingdom or elsewhere; to provide for the modification of certain provisions relating to legal aid; and for connected purposes.
Taking of Hostages Act 1982	1982 c. 28	13 July 1982
An Act to implement the International Convention against the Taking of Hostages; (Note: Hostages Convention) and for connected purposes.
Supply of Goods and Services Act 1982	1982 c. 29	13 July 1982
An Act to amend the law with respect to the terms to be implied in certain contracts for the transfer of the property in goods, in certain contracts for the hire of goods and in certain contracts for the supply of a service; and for connected purposes.
Local Government (Miscellaneous Provisions) Act 1982	1982 c. 30	13 July 1982
An Act to make amendments for England and Wales of provisions of that part of the law relating to local authorities or highways which is commonly amended by local Acts; to make provision for the control of sex establishments; to make further provision for the control of refreshment premises and for consultation between local authorities in England and Wales and fire authorities with regard to fire precautions for buildings and caravan sites; to repeal the Theatrical Employers Registration Acts 1925 (Note: Theatrical Employers Registration Act 1925 (15 & 16 Geo. 5. c. 50)) and 1928; (Note: Theatrical Employers Registration (Amendment) Act 1928 (18 & 19 Geo. 5. c. 46)) to make further provision as to the enforcement of section 8 of the Public Utilities Street Works Act 1950 (Note: Public Utilities Street Works Act 1950 (14 Geo. 6. c. 39)) and sections 171 and 174 of the Highways Act 1980; (Note: Highways Act 1980 (c. 66)) to make provision in connection with the computerisation of local land charges registers; to make further provision in connection with the acquisition of land and rights over land by boards constituted in pursuance of section 1 of the Town and Country Planning Act 1971 or reconstituted in pursuance of Schedule 17 to the Local Government Act 1972; (Note: Local Government Act 1972 (c. 70)) to exclude from the definition of "construction or maintenance work" in section 20 of the Local Government, Planning and Land Act 1980 (Note: Local Government, Planning and Land Act 1980 (c. 65)) work undertaken by local authorities and development bodies pursuant to certain agreements with the Manpower Services Commission which specify the work to be undertaken and under which the Commission agrees to pay the whole or part of the cost of the work so specified; to define "year" for the purposes of Part III of the said Act of 1980; to amend section 140 of the Local Government Act 1972 and to provide for the insurance by local authorities of persons voluntarily assisting probation committees; to make provision for controlling nuisance and disturbance on educational premises; to amend section 137 of the Local Government Act 1972; to make further provision as to arrangements made by local authorities under the Employment and Training Act 1973; (Note: Employment and Training Act 1973 (c. 50)) to extend the duration of certain powers to assist industry or employment conferred by local Acts; to make corrections and minor improvements in certain enactments relating to the local administration of health and planning functions; and for connected purposes.
Firearms Act 1982	1982 c. 31	13 July 1982
An Act to apply the provisions of the Firearms Act 1968 (Note: Firearms Act 1968 (c. 27)) (with certain exceptions) to imitation firearms which are readily convertible into firearms to which section 1 of that Act applies.
Local Government Finance Act 1982	1982 c. 32	13 July 1982
An Act to abolish supplementary rates and supplementary precepts; to require rates and precepts to be made or issued for complete financial years; to provide for the making of substituted rates and the issue of substituted precepts; to regulate proceedings for challenging the validity of rates and precepts; to make further provision with respect to the borrowing powers of local authorities and with respect to relief from rates in enterprise zones; to amend the provisions relating to block grant; to make new provision for auditing the accounts of local authorities and other public bodies; and for connected purposes.
Cinematograph (Amendment) Act 1982 (repealed)	1982 c. 33	13 July 1982
An Act to extend and amend the Cinematograph Acts 1909 (Note: Cinematograph Act 1909 (9 Edw. 7. c. 30)) and 1952. (Note: Cinematograph Act 1952 (15 & 16 Geo. 6 & 1 Eliz. 2. c. 68)) (Repealed by Cinemas Act 1985 (c. 13))
Forfeiture Act 1982	1982 c. 34	13 July 1982
An Act to provide for relief for persons guilty of unlawful killing from forfeiture of inheritance and other rights; to enable such persons to apply for financial provision out of the deceased's estate; to provide for the question whether pension and social security benefits have been forfeited to be determined by the Social Security Commissioners; and for connected purposes.
Copyright Act 1956 (Amendment) Act 1982 (repealed)	1982 c. 35	13 July 1982
An Act to amend section 21 of the Copyright Act 1956 (Note: Copyright Act 1956 (4 & 5 Eliz. 2. c. 74)) so as to make it an offence to be in possession of an infringing copy of a sound recording or cinematograph film by way of trade. (Repealed by Copyright, Designs and Patents Act 1988 (c. 48))
Aviation Security Act 1982	1982 c. 36	23 July 1982
An Act to consolidate certain enactments relating to aviation security.
Merchant Shipping (Liner Conferences) Act 1982	1982 c. 37	23 July 1982
An Act to provide for the implementation in the United Kingdom of the Convention on a Code of Conduct for Liner Conferences signed at Geneva on 6th April 1974; and for connected purposes.
Northern Ireland Act 1982 (repealed)	1982 c. 38	23 July 1982
An Act to make new provision for the resumption of legislative and executive functions by the Northern Ireland Assembly and by persons responsible to it; to amend the Northern Ireland Constitution Act 1973 and the Northern Ireland Assembly Act 1973; and for connected purposes. (Repealed by Northern Ireland Act 1998 (c. 47))
Finance Act 1982	1982 c. 39	30 July 1982
An Act to grant certain duties, to alter other duties, and to amend the law relating to the National Debt and the Public Revenue, and to make further provision in connection with Finance.
Appropriation Act 1982	1982 c. 40	30 July 1982
An Act to apply a sum out of the Consolidated Fund to the service of the year ending on 31st March 1983, to appropriate the supplies granted in this Session of Parliament, and to repeal certain Consolidated Fund and Appropriation Acts.
Stock Transfer Act 1982	1982 c. 41	30 July 1982
An Act to amend the law relating to the transfer, registration and redemption of securities, and for purposes connected therewith.
Derelict Land Act 1982	1982 c. 42	30 July 1982
An Act to repeal and re-enact with amendments section 97 of the National Parks and Access to the Countryside Act 1949, (Note: National Parks and Access to the Countryside Act 1949 (12, 13 & 14 Geo. 6. c. 97)) section 9 of the Local Government Act 1966 (Note: Local Government Act 1966 (c. 42)) and section 8 of the Local Employment Act 1972; (Note: Local Employment Act 1972 (c. 5)) to amend section 89 of the said Act of 1949 and section 16 of the Welsh Development Agency Act 1975; (Note: Welsh Development Agency Act 1975 (c. 70)) and for connected purposes.
Local Government and Planning (Scotland) Act 1982	1982 c. 43	30 July 1982
An Act to make further provision as regards local government and planning in Scotland; to abolish as regards Scotland certain powers of entry and advisory committees; to amend the Tenants' Rights, Etc. (Scotland) Act 1980; (Note: Tenants' Rights, Etc. (Scotland) Act 1980 (c. 52)) and for connected purposes.
Legal Aid Act 1982 (repealed)	1982 c. 44	28 October 1982
An Act to make further provision with respect to the giving of legal aid, and the provision of advice and representation, in criminal cases; and for connected purposes. (Repealed by Legal Aid Act 1988 (c. 34))
Civic Government (Scotland) Act 1982	1982 c. 45	28 October 1982 (Note: The Queen's Printer edition erroneously states that royal assent was given on "00th October 1982", but the Journals of the House of Commons confirm that it was in fact given on 28 October.)
An Act to make provision as regards Scotland for the licensing and regulation of certain activities; for the preservation of public order and safety and the prevention of crime; for prohibiting the taking of and dealing with indecent photographs of children; as to certain powers of constables and others; as to lost and abandoned property and property in the possession of persons taken into police custody; as to the rights and duties of the owners and users of certain land, buildings and other structures; as to the making by local authorities of byelaws; and to enable them to make management rules applying to land or premises under their control; as to certain other functions of local authorities and their officers; as to the time when the Burgh Police (Scotland) Acts 1892 to 1911 and certain local statutory provisions cease to have effect; and for connected purposes.
Employment Act 1982 (repealed)	1982 c. 46	28 October 1982
An Act to provide for compensation out of public funds for certain past cases of dismissal for failure to conform to the requirements of a union membership agreement; to amend the law relating to workers, employers, trade unions and employers' associations; to make provision with respect to awards by industrial tribunals and awards by, and the procedure of, the Employment Appeal Tribunal; and for connected purposes. (Repealed by Statute Law (Repeals) Act 2004 (c. 14))
Duchy of Cornwall Management Act 1982	1982 c. 47	28 October 1982
An Act to widen the powers of management of the Duchy of Cornwall under the Duchy of Cornwall Management Acts 1863 to 1893; to specify a new date for the date before which the Duchy's accounts are to be presented to Parliament under the Duchies of Lancaster and Cornwall (Accounts) Act 1838; (Note: Duchies of Lancaster and Cornwall (Accounts) Act 1838 (1 & 2 Vict. c. 101)) to make provision as to the office of auditor of the Duchy; and for connected purposes.
Criminal Justice Act 1982	1982 c. 48	28 October 1982
An Act to make further provision as to the sentencing and treatment of offenders (including provision as to the enforcement of fines and the standardisation of fines and of certain other sums specified in enactments relating to the powers of criminal courts); to make provision for the prescribing of criteria for the placing and keeping of children in different descriptions of accommodation in community homes; to amend the law of Scotland relating to the mode of trial of certain offences and the recall of witnesses; to amend the law of England and Wales relating to the remand in custody of accused persons and to the grant of bail to persons convicted or sentenced in the Crown Court; to abolish (subject to savings) the right of a person accused in criminal proceedings under the law of England and Wales to make an unsworn statement; and for connected purposes.
Transport Act 1982	1982 c. 49	28 October 1982
An Act to make provision with respect to the disposal by the National Bus Company and their subsidiaries of property, rights and liabilities; to make provision for and in connection with the exercise of certain statutory functions with respect to the testing of vehicles generally and the testing and plating of goods vehicles in the private sector and to make new provision for vehicle-testing in connection with certain international conventions; to make new provision extending and amending the law with respect to fixed penalties for certain road traffic offences and the procedure to be followed and the punishments available in cases where fixed penalties apply; to amend the law relating to goods vehicle operators' licences; to provide for the marking of builders' skips; to give the Secretary of State certain powers in relation to harbour authorities in the interests of national defence; to extend the power under Schedule 1 to the Transport Act 1962 (Note: Transport Act 1962 (10 & 11 Eliz. 2. c. 46)) to determine pensions for members of certain Boards; and to make further miscellaneous amendments of the law relating to road traffic (including provisions relating to the testing and fitness of vehicles).
Insurance Companies Act 1982 (repealed)	1982 c. 50	28 October 1982
An Act to consolidate the Insurance Companies Acts 1974 (Note: Insurance Companies Act 1974 (c. 49)) and 1981. (Note: Insurance Companies Act 1981 (c. 31)) (Repealed by Financial Services and Markets Act 2000 (Consequential Amendments and Repeals) Order 2001 (SI 2001/3649))
Mental Health (Amendment) Act 1982	1982 c. 51	28 October 1982
An Act to amend the Mental Health Act 1959 (Note: Mental Health Act 1959 (7 & 8 Eliz. 2. c. 72)) and for connected purposes.
Industrial Development Act 1982	1982 c. 52	28 October 1982
An Act to consolidate, with certain exceptions, the Local Employment Act 1972, Parts I and II of the Industry Act 1972, section 18 of the Industry Act 1980, (Note: Industry Act 1980 (c. 33)) section 6 of the Industry Act 1981 (Note: Industry Act 1981 (c. 6)) and related enactments.
Administration of Justice Act 1982	1982 c. 53	28 October 1982
An Act to make further provision with respect to the administration of justice and matters connected therewith; to amend the law relating to actions for damages for personal injuries, including injuries resulting in death, and to abolish certain actions for loss of services; to amend the law relating to wills; to make further provision with respect to funds in court, statutory deposits and schemes for the common investment of such funds and deposits and certain other funds; to amend the law relating to deductions by employers under attachment of earnings orders; to make further provision with regard to penalties that may be awarded by the Solicitors' Disciplinary Tribunal under section 47 of the Solicitors Act 1974; (Note: Solicitors Act 1974 (c. 47)) to make further provision for the appointment of justices of the peace in England and Wales and in relation to temporary vacancies in the membership of the Law Commission; to enable the title register kept by the Chief Land Registrar to be kept otherwise than in documentary form; and to authorise the payment of travelling, subsistence and financial loss allowances for justices of the peace in Northern Ireland.
Commonwealth Development Corporation Act 1982 (repealed)	1982 c. 54	22 December 1982
An Act to authorise the making of loans to the Commonwealth Development Corporation by the Secretary of State out of the National Loans Fund and to impose new limits on sums borrowed by, or guaranteed by, the Corporation or any of its subsidiaries. (Repealed by Commonwealth Development Corporation Act 1999 (c. 20))
National Insurance Surcharge Act 1982	1982 c. 55	22 December 1982
An Act to reduce the surcharge imposed by the National Insurance Surcharge Act 1976. (Note: National Insurance Surcharge Act 1976 (c. 85))
Electricity (Financial Provisions) (Scotland) Act 1982	1982 c. 56	22 December 1982
An Act to increase the statutory limits on the amounts outstanding in respect of borrowings by the Scottish Electricity Boards.
Lands Valuation Amendment (Scotland) Act 1982	1982 c. 57	22 December 1982
An Act to amend the definition of the expression "machinery fixed or attached" in section 42 of the Lands Valuation (Scotland) Act 1854. (Note: Lands Valuation (Scotland) Act 1854 (17 & 18 Vict. c. 91))

== Local acts ==
Short title	Citation	Royal assent
Long title
Greater London Council (General Powers) Act 1982	1982 c. i	2 February 1982
An Act to confer further powers upon the Greater London Council and other authorities; and for other purposes.
Western Isles Islands Council (Loch Roag) Order Confirmation Act 1982	1982 c. ii	25 February 1982
An Act to confirm a Provisional Order under the Private Legislation Procedure (Scotland) Act 1936, (Note: Private Legislation Procedure (Scotland) Act 1936 (26 Geo. 5 & 1 Edw. 8. c. 52)) relating to the Western Isles Islands Council (Loch Roag).
	Western Isles Islands Council (Loch Roag) Order 1982 Provisional Order to impose and confer upon the Western Isles Islands Council duties and powers of a harbour authority in and in the vicinity of Loch Roag on the west coast of Lewis; to provide for the transfer to the Council of the harbour of Carloway; and for other purposes.	
Humberside Act 1982	1982 c. iii	25 February 1982
An Act to re-enact with amendments and to extend certain local enactments in force within the county of Humberside; to make further provision in regard to the improvement, health and local government of that county; to confer further powers upon the local authorities of that county; and for other purposes.
County of Avon Act 1982	1982 c. iv	22 March 1982
An Act to re-enact with amendments and to extend certain local enactments in force within the county of Avon; to confer further powers on the County Council of Avon and local authorities in the county; to make further provision with regard to the environment, local government, improvement, health and finances of the county; and for other purposes.
London Transport Act 1982	1982 c. v	22 March 1982
An Act to empower the London Transport Executive to construct works and to acquire lands; to confer further powers on the Executive; and for other purposes.
Saint Thomas' Burial Ground (Southwark) Act 1982	1982 c. vi	7 April 1982
An Act to authorise the removal of restrictions attaching to the burial ground near to St Thomas' Street (Note: St Thomas' Street, in Southwark, formerly St. Thomas's High Street.) in the London borough of Southwark; to authorise the use thereof for other purposes; and for purposes connected therewith.
East Lindsey District Council Act 1982	1982 c. vii	27 May 1982
An Act to confer powers on the East Lindsey District Council with respect to the registration of premises used for the sale of certain articles by way of competitive bidding; and for connected purposes.
Hertsmere Borough Council (Rowley Lane) Act 1982	1982 c. viii	27 May 1982
An Act to empower the Hertsmere Borough Council to execute highway works at Rowley Lane upon land including part of a metropolitan common; and to enact provisions incidental thereto.
Port of London Act 1982	1982 c. ix	27 May 1982
An Act to amend the Port of London Act 1968; (Note: Port of London Act 1968 (c. xxxii)) to provide for increases in the penalties provided for under that Act; to repeal certain provisions of the Port of London Act 1970; (Note: Port of London Act 1970 (c. lxxviii)) and for other or connected purposes.
Thomas Brown and Sons, Limited Act 1982	1982 c. x	28 June 1982
An Act to make provision for the transfer to the State of New South Wales in the Commonwealth of Australia of the incorporation of Thomas Brown and Sons, Limited; for the cesser of application to that company of provisions of the Companies Acts 1948 to 1981; and for other purposes incidental thereto.
Hong Kong and China Gas Company plc Act 1982	1982 c. xi	28 June 1982
An Act to make provision for the transfer to Hong Kong of the incorporation of The Hong Kong and China Gas Company plc; for the cesser of application to that company of provisions of the Companies Acts 1948 to 1981; and for other purposes incidental thereto.
Feltham Station Area Redevelopment (Longford River) Act 1982	1982 c. xii	13 July 1982
An Act to authorise the disposition by the Secretary of State for the Environment to Westminster Bunting Limited, Renslade Investments (London) Limited and Westminster Renslade (Investments) Limited of an interest in a certain section of the Longford River.
Tees and Hartlepool Port Authority Act 1982	1982 c. xiii	23 July 1982
An Act to authorise the Tees and Hartlepool Port Authority to stop up and extinguish certain public rights of way; and for connected purposes.
Lloyd's Act 1982	1982 c. xiv	23 July 1982
An Act to establish a Council of Lloyd's; to define the functions and powers of the said Council; to amend and repeal certain provisions of Lloyd's Acts 1871 to 1951; and for other purposes.
Cumbria Act 1982	1982 c. xv	23 July 1982
An Act to re-enact with amendments and to extend certain local statutory provisions in force within the county of Cumbria; to confer further powers on the Cumbria County Council and local authorities in the county; to make further provision with respect to the improvement, health and local government of the county; and for other purposes.
Woolworths (Aberdeen Development) Order Confirmation Act 1982	1982 c. xvi	30 July 1982
An Act to confirm a Provisional Order under the Private Legislation Procedure (Scotland) Act 1936, relating to Woolworths (Aberdeen Development).
	Woolworths (Aberdeen Development) Order 1982 Provisional Order to authorise Woolworth Leasing Limited to construct buildings or structures bridging over The Green and Martin's Lane in the district of the City of Aberdeen; and for other purposes.	
Commercial Banking Company of Sydney Limited (Merger) Act 1982	1982 c. xvii	30 July 1982
An Act to provide for the transfer to The National Bank of Australasia Limited of the undertaking of The Commercial Banking Company of Sydney Limited and for the transfer to National Nominees Limited of the property held by Commercial Nominees Pty. Limited as trustee; and for other purposes.
Derwent Valley Railway Act 1982	1982 c. xviii	30 July 1982
An Act to provide for the redemption of debenture stock issued by the Derwent Valley Railway Company; for the variation of enactments relating to the Company; and for other purposes.
West Yorkshire (Parking and Transport) Act 1982	1982 c. xix	30 July 1982
An Act to confer further powers on the West Yorkshire Metropolitan County Council and to authorise the West Yorkshire Passenger Transport Executive to operate trolley vehicles; and for other purposes.
Greater London Council (Money) Act 1982	1982 c. xx	30 July 1982
An Act to regulate prescribed expenditure and expenditure on lending to other persons by the Greater London Council, including prescribed expenditure of the London Transport Executive and their wholly-owned subsidiaries which is to be treated as prescribed expenditure of the Greater London Council, during the financial period from 1st April 1982 to 30th September 1983; and for other purposes.
London Transport (General Powers) Act 1982	1982 c. xxi	28 October 1982
An Act to empower the London Transport Executive to construct works and to acquire lands; to confer further powers on the Executive; and for other purposes.
Southern Water Authority Act 1982	1982 c. xxii	28 October 1982
An Act to authorise the Southern Water Authority to construct works and to acquire lands; to regulate the use of vessels and houseboats on certain parts of the river Medway; to confer further powers on the Southern Water Authority; and for other purposes.
British Railways Act 1982	1982 c. xxiii	28 October 1982
An Act to empower the British Railways Board to construct works and to purchase lands; to confer further powers on the Board; and for other purposes.
Writers to the Signet Dependants' Annuity Fund Order Confirmation Act 1982	1982 c. xxiv	22 December 1982
An Act to confirm a Provisional Order under the Private Legislation Procedure (Scotland) Act 1936, relating to the Writers to the Signet Dependants' Annuity Fund.
	Writers to the Signet Dependants' Annuity Fund Order 1982 Provisional Order to make provision in relation to the regulation and control of the Writers to the Signet Dependants' Annuity Fund; to repeal the Writers to the Signet Widows' Fund Orders 1955 and 1965; and for other purposes.	
Highland Region (Banavie Level Crossing) Order Confirmation Act 1982	1982 c. xxv	22 December 1982
An Act to confirm a Provisional Order under the Private Legislation Procedure (Scotland) Act 1936, relating to Highland Region (Banavie Level Crossing).
	Highland Region (Banavie Level Crossing) Order 1982 Provisional Order to provide for the construction and maintenance of a level crossing at Banavie in the district of Lochaber; and for purposes connected therewith.	
Lerwick Harbour Order Confirmation Act 1982	1982 c. xxvi	22 December 1982
An Act to confirm a Provisional Order under the Private Legislation Procedure (Scotland) Act 1936, relating to Lerwick Harbour.
	Lerwick Harbour Order 1982 Provisional Order to authorise the Trustees of the port and harbour of Lerwick to construct a new work in connection with the improvement of the harbour; to acquire lands; to provide for the Trustees to be a local lighthouse authority; to confer powers on the Trustees with respect to the control of wrecks; and for other purposes.	
Western Isles Islands Council (Omnibus Services) Order Confirmation Act 1982	1982 c. xxvii	22 December 1982
An Act to confirm a Provisional Order under the Private Legislation Procedure (Scotland) Act 1936, relating to the Western Isles Islands Council (Omnibus Services).
	Western Isles Islands Council (Omnibus Services) Order 1982 Provisional Order to empower the Western Isles Islands Council to operate an omnibus undertaking.	

== Personal acts ==
Short title	Citation	Royal assent
Long title
John Francis Dare and Gillian Loder Dare (Marriage Enabling) Act 1982	1982 c. 1	27 May 1982
An Act to enable John Francis Dare and Gillian Loder Dare to be married to each other.
Hugh Small and Norma Small (Marriage Enabling) Act 1982	1982 c. 2	27 May 1982
An Act to enable Hugh Small and Norma Small to be married to each other.

== See also ==
- List of acts of the Parliament of the United Kingdom
