= Oil and Pipelines Act 1985 =

Act of the Parliament of the United Kingdom

Oil and Pipelines Act 1985 (Note: Section 8(1).)
- Act of Parliament
- Parliament of the United Kingdom
- Long title: An Act to provide for the establishment and functions of a body corporate to be called the Oil and Pipelines Agency, for the vesting in that Agency of the property, rights and liabilities of the British National Oil Corporation and for the subsequent dissolution of that Corporation.
- Citation: 1985 c. 62
- Introduced by: The Minister of State, Department of Energy (Alick Buchanan-Smith) (Second reading) 14 May 1985 (Commons)
- Territorial extent: United Kingdom (Note: Section 8(4).)

Dates
- Royal assent: 30 October 1985
- Commencement: 1 December 1985 (Note: Section 8(2)–(3). The Oil and Pipelines Act 1985 (Commencement) Order 1985 (SI 1985/1748) and the Oil and Pipelines Act 1985 (Appointed Day) Order 1985 (SI 1985/1749).)
Other legislation
Amends	Petroleum and Submarine Pipe-lines Act 1975; Participation Agreements Act 1978; Finance (No. 2) Act 1979; Oil and Gas (Enterprise) Act 1982; Finance Act 1982; Miscellaneous Financial Provisions Act 1983; National Audit Act 1983
Amended by	Gas Act 1986; Companies Act 1989; Companies Act 1989 (Eligibility for Appointment as Company Auditor) (Consequential Amendments) Regulations 1991; Petroleum Act 1998; Government Resources and Accounts Act 2000 (Audit of Public Bodies) Order 2003; Companies Act 2006 (Consequential Amendments, Transitional Provisions and Savings) Order 2009

Status: Amended

Text of statute as originally enacted

Revised text of statute as amended

Text of the Oil and Pipelines Act 1985 as in force today (including any amendments) within the United Kingdom, from legislation.gov.uk.

The Oil and Pipelines Act 1985 (c. 62) is an act of the Parliament of the United Kingdom which established the Oil and Pipelines Agency to buy, sell or deal in petroleum and to manage on behalf of the Crown petroleum pipelines and storage installations. The act abolished the British National Oil Corporation and transferred its assets to the Agency.

== Background ==
The government had established the British National Oil Corporation (BNOC) in 1975 under the provisions of the Petroleum and Submarine Pipe-lines Act 1975. BNOC, as constituted, was effectively two businesses: firstly for the production of oil and petroleum, and secondly for trading in oil. The Oil and Gas (Enterprise) Act 1982 enabled the government to transfer the upstream oil exploration and production side of the BNOC's business into Britoil, a limited liability company. Britoil was floated on the stock market in November 1982 and again in August 1985. The downstream trading side of the business remained within BNOC. However, by 1983 with falling oil prices, participation and trading in the petroleum markets ceased to be profitable for BNOC. The Oil and Pipelines Act 1985 provided the legal mechanism whereby BNOC was abolished and the Crown's interest in petroleum pipelines and storage installations was transferred into a new corporate body, the Oil and Pipelines Agency.

== Provisions ==
The act received royal assent on 30 October 1985. Its long title is: ‘An Act to provide for the establishment and functions of a body corporate to be called the Oil and Pipelines Agency, for the vesting in that Agency of the property, rights and liabilities of the British National Oil Corporation and for the subsequent dissolution of that Corporation.’

The act comprises 8 sections and 4 schedules.

- Section 1 – established the Oil and Pipelines Agency, comprising a chairman and two to four other members appointed by the Secretary of State for Energy.
- Section 2 – defined the functions of the Agency including the power to buy, sell or deal in petroleum and to manage on behalf of the Crown petroleum pipelines and storage installations.
- Section 3 – transferred to the Agency the property and rights of the British National Oil Corporation.
- Section 4 – placed a duty on the Agency to dispose of the surplus property, rights and liabilities of the corporation.
- Section 5 – placed a duty on the Agency to comply with any instruction from the Secretary of State.
- Section 6 – Interpretation of terms.
- Section 7 – Amendments and repeals of Legislation.
- Section 8 – Short title, commencement and extent.
- Schedule 1 – The Agency: appointment and tenure of members, remuneration, staff, proceedings, documents.
- Schedule 2 –Supplementary provisions of Section 3.
- Schedule 3 – Financial and other provisions, borrowing, loans and grants by, and payments to, the Secretary of State, annual reports and accounts, audits.
- Schedule 4 – Repeals: Part 1 (Sections 1–16) of the Petroleum and Submarine Pipe-lines Act 1975, which had established BNOC; and Sections 1 to 7 of the Oil and Gas (Enterprise) Act 1982, which related to the powers of BNOC.

== Consequential legislation ==
The provisions of the Oil and Pipelines Act 1985 came into force on 1 December 1985.

The appointed day for the transfer of assets from BNOC to the OPA was 1 December 1985 (Statutory Instrument S.I. 1985/1749)

The British National Oil Corporation was dissolved 27 March 1986 (S.I. 1986/585).

== See also ==
- Oil and gas industry in the United Kingdom
- North Sea Oil
- Oil and Pipelines Agency
- Oil and Pipelines Agency
