= Oil and Gas (Enterprise) Act 1982 =

Act of the Parliament of the United Kingdom

Oil and Gas (Enterprise) Act 1982 (Note: Section 38(1).)
- Act of Parliament
- Parliament of the United Kingdom
- Long title: An Act to make further provision with respect to the British National Oil Corporation; to abolish the National Oil Account; to make further provision with respect to the British Gas Corporation; to make provision for and in connection with the supply of gas through pipes by persons other than the Corporation; to amend the Petroleum (Production) Act 1934 and to make further provision about licences to search for and get petroleum; to repeal and re-enact with amendments sections 2 and 3 of the Continental Shelf Act 1964; to extend the application of the Mineral Workings (Offshore Installations) Act 1971 and the Offshore Petroleum Development (Scotland) Act 1975; to amend the Miscellaneous Financial Provisions Act 1968, the Petroleum and Submarine Pipe-lines Act 1975 and the Participation Agreements Act 1978; and for connected purposes.
- Citation: 1982 c. 23
- Introduced by: Michael Howard (Second Reading) (Commons)
- Territorial extent: England and Wales; Scotland; Northern Ireland (except parts II and II and schedule 2); (Note: Section 38(3).)

Dates
- Royal assent: 28 June 1982
- Commencement: various (Note: Section 38(2).)

Other legislation
- Amends: Petroleum (Production) Act 1934; Continental Shelf Act 1964; Mineral Workings (Offshore Installations) Act 1971; Gas Act 1972; Fatal Accidents and Sudden Deaths Inquiry (Scotland) Act 1976
- Amended by: Oil and Pipelines Act 1985; Gas Act 1986; Wages Act 1986; Social Security (Consequential Provisions) Act 1992; Offshore Safety Act 1992; Statute Law (Repeals) Act 1993; Employment Tribunals Act 1996; Employment Rights Act 1996; Petroleum Act 1998; Inquiries into Fatal Accidents and Sudden Deaths etc. (Scotland) Act 2016

Status: Amended

Text of statute as originally enacted

Revised text of statute as amended

Text of the Oil and Gas (Enterprise) Act 1982 as in force today (including any amendments) within the United Kingdom, from legislation.gov.uk.

The Oil and Gas (Enterprise) Act 1982 (c. 23) is an act of the Parliament of the United Kingdom which started the process of privatisation of the oil and gas industries in the UK. It empowered the government to float off and sell shares in Britoil the upstream production side of the British National Oil Corporation. It ended the British Gas Corporation’s monopoly on the transportation and supply of gas, opening up the gas market to other gas suppliers. The act made miscellaneous provisions relating to the oil and gas industries concerning Petroleum Licences and Offshore Installations.

== Background ==
The British gas industry had been in state ownership since nationalisation of the industry in 1949. The Gas Act 1972 had established the British Gas Corporation to exercise full responsibility for the oversight, control and operation of the gas industry.

The government had established the British National Oil Corporation (BNOC) in 1975 under the provision of the Petroleum and Submarine Pipe-lines Act 1975. BNOC had the power to search for and produce petroleum in underground strata in any part of the world; to move, store and treat petroleum and anything derived from it; and to buy, sell and otherwise deal in petroleum and anything derived from it. As constituted BNOC was effectively two businesses: firstly for the production of oil, and secondly the trading in oil.

In the early 1980s Margaret Thatcher’s government saw a need to reduce the perceived inefficient state control of the energy sector, and to introduce a market-oriented system through privatization. As the Secretary of State for Energy, Nigel Lawson, said in Parliament at the Second Reading of the Oil and Gas (Enterprise) Bill ‘the proper business of Government is not the government of business... no industrial corporation should be owned and controlled by the State unless there is a positive and specific reason for such an arrangement.’

The Oil and Gas (Enterprise) Act 1982 enabled the government to float off and sell shares in the upstream oil-producing business of BNOC and establish a new structure for the trading business of BNOC. It provided new powers for the disposal of assets held by the British Gas Corporation, and ended the corporation's monopoly on the transportation and supply of gas.

The act included miscellaneous provisions for oil and gas industry including the granting of Petroleum Licences, and to the Safety Zones of Offshore Installation partly in response to Alexander L. Keilland disaster in March 1980.

== Oil and Gas (Enterprise) Act 1982 ==
The Oil and Gas (Enterprise) Act 1982 (c. 23) received royal assent on 28 June 1982. Its long title is: 'An Act to make further provision with respect to the British National Oil Corporation; to abolish the National Oil Account; to make further provision with respect to the British Gas Corporation; to make provision for and in connection with the supply of gas through pipes by persons other than the Corporation; to amend the Petroleum (Production) Act 1934 and to make further provision about licences to search for and get petroleum; to repeal and re-enact with amendments sections 2 and 3 of the Continental Shelf Act 1964; to extend the application of the Mineral Workings (Offshore Installations) Act 1971 and the Offshore Petroleum Development (Scotland) Act 1975; to amend the Miscellaneous Financial Provisions Act 1968, the Petroleum and Submarine Pipe-lines Act 1975 and the Participation Agreements Act 1978; and for connected purposes.'

=== Provisions ===
The act comprises 38 sections in five parts and four schedules:

- PART I Oil
  - The British National Oil Corporation – Sections 1 to 7 – The Oil Corporation's powers of disposal, powers of Secretary of State, a new financial structure of the Oil Corporation, payments by the Oil Corporation to Secretary of State, grants by Secretary of State to the Oil Corporation, borrowing powers of the Oil Corporation
  - The National Oil Account – Section 8 – Abolition of the National Oil Account
- PART II Gas
  - The British Gas Corporation – Sections 9 to 11 – The Gas Corporation's powers of disposal, powers of Secretary of State in disposals by the Gas Corporation
  - Supply of gas by persons other than Gas Corporation – Sections 12 to 14 – Supply of gas by other persons, standards of quality, safety regulations
  - Use by other persons of pipe-lines belonging to Gas Corporation – Sections 15 to 17 – Construction of pipe-lines by the Gas Corporation, increase of capacity etc. of pipe-lines belonging to the Gas Corporation, rights to use pipe-lines belonging to the Gas Corporation
- PART III Petroleum Licences
  - Sections 18-20 – Amendment of enabling powers, modification of model clauses in existing licences, modification of model clauses for incorporation in future licences
- PART IV Offshore Activities
  - Sections 21 to 28 – Safety zones around installations, application of criminal and civil law, extended meaning of "offshore installation" and "pipe-line", extended application of the Offshore Petroleum Development (Scotland) Act 1975, prosecutions, Interpretation of Part IV
- PART V Miscellaneous and General
  - Sections 29 to 38 – Northern Ireland and Isle of Man shares of petroleum revenue, payments to petroleum production licence holders, participation agreements, regulations, orders etc., Stamp duty, Trustee Investments Act 1961, financial provisions, general interpretation, amendments and repeals, short title, commencement and extent
- Schedules
  - Schedule 1 – Provisions to transfer property, rights and liabilities
  - Schedule 2 – Petroleum Production Licences
  - Schedule 3 – Minor and Consequential Amendments
  - Schedule 4 – Repeals

== Consequences of the Act ==
The upstream oil exploration and production side of the British National Oil Corporation was transferred to Britoil, a limited liability company. Britoil was floated on the stock market in November 1982 and again in August 1985. At one stage it was of the fourth largest oil and gas producer in the North Sea. Britoil was sold to BP in 1988.

From 1983, with a falling oil price, participation and trading ceased to be profitable for BNOC and the organisation was formally wound up on 27 March 1986.

The British Gas Corporation remained an integrated company, and its natural instinct was to discourage new entrants in the gas market from competing against it. Furthermore, BGC had contracted to take all the gas available from UK continental shelf gas fields. Further legislation would be needed to fully open the gas supply industry to competition, this was enacted by the Gas Act 1986.

== Later enactments ==
The British gas industry was privatised in 1986 under the provisions of the Gas Act 1986. The Act abolished the British Gas Corporation and established British Gas plc. The 1986 Act also established a licensing regime, a Gas Consumers’ Council, and a regulator for the industry called the Office of Gas Supply (OFGAS).

The Oil and Pipelines Act 1985 repealed Part 1 (Sections 1–7) of the 1982 act and formally abolished the British National Oil Corporation and transferred its property, rights and liabilities to the Oil and Pipelines Agency.

Sections 12 to 17 of the 1982 act were repealed by the 1986 act.

The whole of the 1992 act except sections 24, 26, 31, 37 and 38 and, in Schedule 3, paragraphs 1, 3, 4, 8 (so far as relating to sections 3 and 9 of the Mineral Workings (Offshore Installations) Act 1971), 11, 34, 37 and 39, was repealed by the Petroleum Act 1998.

== See also ==
- Oil and gas industry in the United Kingdom
- North Sea Oil
