= Offshore installation manager =

Manager of a UK oil rig

The offshore installation manager (OIM) is the most senior manager of an offshore platform operating on the UK Continental Shelf.

Many offshore operators have adopted this UK offshore management model and title and applied it to their operations in all global regions irrespective of the local regulations in force.

In the United Kingdom, the individual must be officially registered as an OIM with the Offshore Safety Division of the Health and Safety Executive and the OIM is responsible for the health, welfare and safety of the personnel on board the installation, whether a drilling rig, production platform or a support vessel (e.g. a flotel).

The OIM position had arisen in part from the Inquiry into the 1965 Sea Gem disaster, in which the Sea Gem drilling rig collapsed and sank in the southern sector of the North Sea with a loss of 13 lives. The Inquiry recommended that " ... there ought to be a 'master' or unquestioned authority on these rigs" and that " ... there ought to be the equivalent of a shipmaster's daily round when the 'master' could question those responsible for different aspects of the day-to-day management of the whole." The recommendations from the Sea Gem Inquiry were formalised in the Mineral Workings (Offshore Installations) Act 1971 which requires a registered OIM to be in charge of each installation.

Training and selection of OIMs has been the subject of research projects and specialist training.

== See also ==
- Mineral Workings (Offshore Installations) Act 1971
- Offshore Safety Act 1992
