= Clyde oil field =

UK crude oil field

- Location within North Sea
- Country: United Kingdom
- Region: North Sea
- Location/block: 30/17b
- Offshore/onshore: Offshore
- Coordinates: 56.4528°N 2.2883°E
- Operators: Britoil, BP, Talisman, Talisman Sinopec Energy, Repsol Sinopec
- Owner: Esso, Shell, Britoil, BP, Talisman, Talisman Sinopec Energy, Repsol Sinopec

Field history
- Discovery: 1978
- Start of production: 1987

Production
- Recoverable oil: 154 million barrels (~2.10×10^{7} t)
- Recoverable oil (million tonnes): 17.7
- Producing formations: Jurassic sandstone

The Clyde oil field is a crude oil producing field in the UK sector of the North Sea, 290 km east-south-east of Aberdeen. Production of oil started in 1987 and the field is still operational (2021).

== The field ==
The Clyde oil field is located in Block 30/17b of the UK North Sea continental shelf. It is named after the Scottish river. The Clyde field was discovered in 1978 and the oil reservoir comprises an Upper Jurassic sandstone at a depth of 10,000 feet (3,000 metres). The reservoir and its fluids has the following characteristics:

Clyde reservoir and fluids
Parameter	Value
Porosity	0.23%
Permeability	105 md
API gravity	38.1°API
Gas Oil Ratio	477 standard cubic feet/barrel
Sulfur content	0.3%
Recoverable reserves	154 million barrels, 17.7 million tonnes

== Owners and operators ==
The initial owners of the field were Britoil (51%), Shell UK Ltd (24.5%) and Esso Petroleum Company Ltd (24.5%). Britoil was the operator. BP assumed ownership of Britoil assets in 1988. BP sold its interest in Clyde to Talisman in 1996. The company became Talisman Sinopec Energy, then Repsol Sinopec.

== Development ==
The Clyde field was developed by a single integrated drilling, production and accommodation platform. The principal design data of the Clyde platform is given in the following table.

Clyde platform design data
Coordinates	56.452778N 2.288333E
Water depth, metres	80
Fabrication substructure	John Brown Earl & Wright
Jacket weight, tonnes	12,300
Topsides design	Humphreys & Glasgow
Topsides weight, tonnes	17,259
Function	Drilling, production, accommodation
Accommodation (crew)	207
Type	Steel jacket
Legs	8
Piles	26
Well slots	30 (23 production, 5 water injection)
Throughput oil, barrels per day (bpd)	60,000
Water injection, bpd	100,000
Platform installed	Summer 1985, May 1986
Production started	Late 1987
Oil production to	Fulmar A by 9.85 km 16-inch pipeline
Gas production to	Fulmar A by 9.85 km 16-inch pipeline

=== Processing ===
Oil from the wellheads and subsea tie-ins is routed to the 1st stage 3-phase (oil, gas, water) separator. Oil then flows to the 2nd stage and 3rd stage separators operating at successively lower pressures. After metering the oil is pumped to the Fulmar A platform for storage and tanker loading.

Produced water from the separators is treated in a degassing vessel and hydrocyclones to an oil-in-water concentration of less than 30 ppm prior to discharge overboard.

Gas from the separators is compressed in the LP Compressor, Intermediate Pressure (IP) Compressor, HP Compressor and Export/Lift Compressor. There is also a gas dehydration plant. Gas in excess of that required for gas lift is exported to Fulmar A and then to the SEGAL system to St. Fergus terminal.

The fluid handling capability of the Clyde facilities in its latter years was as follows:

Clyde processing capability
Clyde process facility	Capacity
Crude oil export	60,000 bpd
Gas dehydration	42 MMSCFD
Produced water treatment	97,000 bpd
Water injection	73,000 bpd

=== Other fields ===
Several subsea fields are connected to Clyde through flowlines and pipelines. These fields include Leven, Medwin, Nethan, Orion, Cawdor and Flyndre. There are dedicated Separators on Clyde for the Orion and Flyndre fields. Data on these fields are as follows:

Field	Cawdor	Flyndre	Leven	Medwin	Nethan	Orion
Block	30/14	30/13	30/17b	30/17b	30/17	30/18
Water depth, m	70	70	86.9	75		
Reserves, million tonnes	10.5 million barrels	0.1 million Sm3	1.03	0.48		
Production start		2017	1992	1994	2004	1999
Peak production, million tonnes per year	5,000 bpd	10,000 bpd	0.24	0.18	13.1 ton th	
Pipeline	20.46 km	20 km 8.5-inch pipeline				16.3 km 10-inch pipeline

The Flyndre field is located in the Norwegian sector of the North Sea. Production began in March 2017.
