= Fatal accident inquiry =

A fatal accident inquiry (FAI) is a Scottish judicial process which investigates and determines the circumstances of some deaths occurring in Scotland. Until 2009, they did not apply to any deaths occurring in other jurisdictions, when the Coroners and Justice Act 2009 extended the Fatal Accidents and Sudden Deaths Inquiry (Scotland) Act 1976 to service personnel at the discretion of the Chief Coroner or the Secretary of State. The equivalent process in England and Wales is an inquest. A major review of the fatal accident inquiries was undertaken by Lord Cullen of Whitekirk, at the request of the Scottish Government, which resulted in the passing of the Inquiries into Fatal Accidents and Sudden Deaths etc. (Scotland) Act 2016.

== History ==
Fatal Accidents Inquiry (Scotland) Act 1895 (Note: Section 1.)
- Act of Parliament
- Parliament of the United Kingdom
- Long title: An Act to make provision for Public Inquiry in regard to Fatal Accidents occurring in Industrial Employments or Occupations in Scotland.
- Citation: 58 & 59 Vict. c. 36
- Territorial extent: Scotland (Note: Section 2.)

Dates
- Royal assent: 6 July 1895
- Commencement: 6 July 1895 (Note: The Acts of Parliament (Commencement) Act 1793.)
- Repealed: 1 March 1977 (Note: The Fatal Accidents and Sudden Deaths Inquiry (Scotland) Act 1976 Commencement Order 1977 (SI 1977/190).)
Other legislation
| Amended by | Fatal Accidents and Sudden Deaths Inquiry (Scotland) Act 1906; Administration of Justice (Scotland) Act 1933; Local Government (Scotland) Act 1947 |
| Repealed by | Fatal Accidents and Sudden Deaths Inquiry (Scotland) Act 1976 |

Status: Repealed

Text of statute as originally enacted

Fatal Accidents and Sudden Deaths Inquiry (Scotland) Act 1906
- Act of Parliament
- Parliament of the United Kingdom
- Long title: An Act to amend the Fatal Accidents Inquiry (Scotland) Act, 1895, and to make further provision for Inquiry into Sudden and Suspicious Deaths in Scotland.
- Citation: 6 Edw. 7. c. 35
- Territorial extent: United Kingdom

Dates
- Royal assent: 4 August 1906
- Commencement: 4 August 1906
- Repealed: 1 March 1977
Other legislation
| Amends | Fatal Accidents Inquiry (Scotland) Act 1895 |
| Repealed by | Fatal Accidents and Sudden Deaths Inquiry (Scotland) Act 1976 |

Status: Repealed

Text of statute as originally enacted

Fatal Accidents and Sudden Deaths Inquiry (Scotland) Act 1976 (Note: Section 10(4).)
- Act of Parliament
- Parliament of the United Kingdom
- Long title: An Act to make provision for Scotland for the holding of public inquiries in respect of fatal accidents, deaths of persons in legal custody, sudden, suspicious and unexplained deaths and deaths occurring in circumstances giving rise to serious public concern.
- Citation: 1976 c. 14
- Territorial extent: United Kingdom (sections 4(4)–(5) and 9); Scotland; (Note: Section 10(5).)

Dates
- Royal assent: 13 April 1976
- Commencement: 1 March 1977 (Note: Section 10(5). The Fatal Accidents and Sudden Deaths Inquiry (Scotland) Act 1976 Commencement Order 1977 (SI 1977/190).)
- Repealed: 15 June 2016 (Note: The Inquiries into Fatal Accidents and Sudden Deaths etc. (Scotland) Act 2016 (Commencement No. 3, Transitional and Saving Provisions) Regulations 2017 (SSI 2017/155).)
Other legislation
| Amends | Administration of Justice (Scotland) Act 1933; Prisons (Scotland) Act 1952; Gas Act 1965; Merchant Shipping Act 1970; Mineral Workings (Offshore Installations) Act 1971; Health and Safety at Work etc. Act 1974; Petroleum and Submarine Pipe-lines Act 1975 |
| Repeals/revokes | Fatal Accidents Inquiry (Scotland) Act 1895; Fatal Accidents and Sudden Deaths Inquiry (Scotland) Act 1906 |
| Amended by | Criminal Procedure (Scotland) Act 1975; Oil and Gas (Enterprise) Act 1982; Criminal Justice Act 1982; Statute Law (Repeals) Act 1989; Criminal Procedure (Consequential Provisions) (Scotland) Act 1995; Petroleum Act 1998; Armed Forces Act 2006; Coroners and Justice Act 2009 |
| Repealed by | Inquiries into Fatal Accidents and Sudden Deaths etc. (Scotland) Act 2016 |

Status: Repealed

Text of statute as originally enacted

Revised text of statute as amended

Inquiries into Fatal Accidents and Sudden Deaths etc. (Scotland) Act 2016 (Note: Section 43.)
- Act of Parliament
- Parliament of Scotland
- Long title: An Act of the Scottish Parliament to make provision for the holding of public inquiries in respect of certain deaths.
- Citation: 2016 asp 2
- Territorial extent: Scotland

Dates
- Royal assent: 14 January 2016
- Commencement: various (Note: Section 42.)
Other legislation
| Amends | Gas Act 1965; Health and Safety at Work etc. Act 1974; Oil and Gas (Enterprise) Act 1982; Anatomy Act 1984; Merchant Shipping Act 1995; Criminal Procedure (Consequential Provisions) (Scotland) Act 1995]; Petroleum Act 1998; Freedom of Information Act 2000; Scottish Public Services Ombudsman Act 2002; Freedom of Information (Scotland) Act 2002; Police, Public Order and Criminal Justice (Scotland) Act 2006; Scottish Commission for Human Rights Act 2006; Armed Forces Act 2006; Coroners and Justice Act 2009; Energy Act 2013; Tribunals (Scotland) Act 2014 |
| Repeals/revokes | Fatal Accidents and Sudden Deaths Inquiry (Scotland) Act 1976 |
| Amended by | Inquiries into Fatal Accidents and Sudden Deaths etc. (Scotland) Act 2016 (Consequential Provisions and Modifications) Order 2016; Coronavirus (Recovery and Reform) (Scotland) Act 2022; Northern Ireland Troubles (Legacy and Reconciliation) Act 2023; Children (Care and Justice) (Scotland) Act 2024 |

Status: Amended

Text of statute as originally enacted

Revised text of statute as amended

Text of the Inquiries into Fatal Accidents and Sudden Deaths etc. (Scotland) Act 2016 as in force today (including any amendments) within the United Kingdom, from legislation.gov.uk.

Fatal accident inquiries were introduced into Scots Law by the Fatal Accidents Inquiry (Scotland) Act 1895 (58 & 59 Vict. c. 36), before which time the circumstances of a death which required examination were determined by a procurator fiscal. Since then, the procurator fiscal now deals with the investigation and initiation of such inquiries. The law was updated by the Fatal Accidents and Sudden Deaths Inquiry (Scotland) Act 1976 (c. 14). The applicable legislation is now the Inquiries into Fatal Accidents and Sudden Deaths etc. (Scotland) Act 2016 (asp 2), and the law provides for inquiries to be held on a mandatory basis for some deaths and on a discretionary basis for others.

Previously, a fatal accident inquiry only dealt with deaths that occurred in Scotland, whereas in England and Wales a coroner will deal with the investigation of a death where the body lies within their district irrespective of where the death actually occurred. This led to some distress being caused to the families of service personnel who had been killed abroad but whose bodies have been returned through or to England at the insistence of the Ministry of Defence and in consequence their funerals have been delayed.

The inquiries process was reviewed by Lord Cullen of Whitekirk for the Scottish Government in 2008, following which the Scottish Government consulted on proposals in 2014. The Inquiries into Fatal Accidents and Sudden Deaths etc. (Scotland) Act 2016 (asp 2) was passed by the Scottish Parliament on 10 December 2015, and replaced the 1976 act when it came into force in June 2017.

== Process ==
=== Death certificates ===
A person cannot be buried or cremated in Scotland unless a medical practitioner has issued a death certificate (and the associated certificate of registration of death, known as a form 14, has been issued), and doctors are mandated to report certain sudden, suspicious, accidental, or unexplained deaths to the procurator fiscal, and the report will be received by the Scottish Fatalities Investigation Unit, part of the Crown Office and Procurator Fiscal Service. The procurator fiscal can require a Police investigation, and where mandated by statute, or otherwise at their discretion, the procurator fiscal can hold a fatal accident inquiry.

=== Criminal acts ===
Where the death appears to be due to a criminal act, the procurator fiscal will initiate investigations by the police, or other appropriate public authorities, to enable the identification of suspects and associated evidence to enable them to prosecute the case in the Sheriff Court, or for an Advocate Depute to prosecute in the High Court of Justiciary.

=== Mandatory inquiries ===
A fatal accident inquiry is mandated by the 2016 Act if the death occurred while the deceased was in lawful custody or whilst they were at work. Other inquiries may be held where the procurator fiscal decides it is "expedient in the public interest". The Lord Advocate has the discretion not to hold an inquiry (including a mandatory inquiry) where the circumstances of the death have been adequately established in criminal proceedings.

=== Territorial jurisdiction ===
A fatal accident inquiry will take place before a Sheriff (judge) in a Sheriff court; there is no jury. Proceedings are inquisitorial, as opposed to adversarial. Evidence is presented by the procurator fiscal in the public interest, and other parties may be represented. Parties can choose representation by Advocate (counsel) or solicitor, or may appear in person.

A fatal accident inquiry does not need to take place in the sheriffdom where the death occurred, and will take place in whichever sheriffdom the Lord Advocate determines. Although the Lord Advocate must consult the Scottish Courts and Tribunals Service before making a determination. A sheriff may make an order to transfer the inquiry subject to another sherrifdom, subject the approval of the relevant sheriffs principal.

=== Determinations ===
Section 6 of the 1976 Act the Sheriff is required to produce a determination. In drafting a determination the Sheriff is required to consider five distinct areas:

1. Time and place of the death
2. The cause of death
3. Any precautions which may have avoided the death
4. Any defects in the system of working which may have avoided the death
5. Any other relevant considerations.

The 2016 Act introduces several changes to the previous system governed by the 1976 Act, including:

1. Mandatory inquiries for deaths in lawful custody are extended to the deaths of children in secure accommodation
2. Discretionary inquiries can held at the direction of the Lord Advocate for deaths abroad
3. If requested, the Lord Advocate must provide a written explanation if they decide not to hold an inquiry
4. Inquiries may be reopened, or a fresh inquiry held, where there is new evidence

== Events subject to a fatal accident inquiry ==
Examples include:

- The Quintinshill rail disaster in 1915
- The 1971 Ibrox disaster
- The Waage Drill II diving accident (1975)
- The Venture One diving accident (1977)
- The Star Canopus diving accident (1978)
- The Wildrake diving accident (1979)
- Pan Am Flight 103, Lockerbie (1988)
- 1994 Scotland RAF Chinook crash, Mull of Kintyre
- The helicopter crash that killed Colin McRae in 2007
- 2014 Glasgow bin lorry crash

== See also ==
- Courts of Scotland
- Crown Office
- Lord Advocate
- Inquests in England and Wales
