= Sea Gem =

Jack-up oil rig

Sea Gem was the first British jack-up oil rig and made the first British discovery of natural gas in September 1965, although the find was too small to be commercially profitable. It is also known for its sinking off the coast of Lincolnshire on 27 December 1965 resulting in 13 fatalities.

== Background ==
In the early 1960s, oil companies had found some crude oil in Great Britain, as well as in the Netherlands and Germany, and suspected that there was more to be found under the North Sea. Barriers had to be overcome before it was to be possible to search for oil and gas. There had been no international agreements that addressed the rights to the various minerals and areas outside the three-mile (5 km) limit. Also, the technology required was not yet developed, or had not matured enough to be commercially usable.

A major factor was that the oil companies generally did not think that there were significant enough reserves in the North Sea to warrant the use of resources to search for oil. This situation changed when fields such as the Groningen gas field in the Netherlands, and to a certain extent, Eakring in Nottinghamshire, proved to contain fairly large reserves. This prompting the oil companies to begin a search in nearby areas, including the North Sea. Sea Gem made the first British discovery of natural gas in September 1965, although the find was too small to be commercially profitable.

Sea Gem was originally a 5,600 ton steel barge, converted to function as an oil rig by BP in 1964. The conversion involved fitting 10 steel legs, making it possible to provide a stable platform by raising the barge 15 metres (49 ft) above the water's surface. A helipad, living quarters for the crew of 34, and a drilling tower with associated structures was also added.

== Disaster ==
On 27 December 1965, the rig was located approximately 67 kilometres (42 mi; 36 nmi) off the coast of Lincolnshire in Block 48/6, an area close to where the West Sole gas field would later be discovered. The rig went down at 53°42′30″N 01°08′22″E.

The crew were in the process of moving the elevated rig to another site approximately two nautical miles (3.7 km; 2.3 mi) away, this involved lowering the rig onto the surface of the water to float it to the new site. When the rig was being lowered, two of the legs crumpled and broke, causing the rig to immediately capsize, with equipment and people sliding off into the freezing cold water of the North Sea.

The radio hut was among the equipment that fell into the sea and the rig was not able to send out an emergency signal. The nearby British freight ship SS Baltrover observed the capsizing and sent out emergency signals. This vessel, together with a Royal Air Force and civilian helicopter rescued 19 of the Sea Gem's 32 crew.

As a result of a public inquiry into the accident, several changes were made in order to improve the safety of oil rigs. Amongst them was the use of a stand-by boat, which would be able to help rescue crews in the event of future accidents, and the recognition of an offshore installation manager. The inquiry concluded brittle fracture in part of the suspension system linking the hull to the legs was the cause of the collapse.

== See also ==
- Mr. Louie
- Minerals Workings (Offshore Installations) Act 1971
