= Offshore Safety Act 1992 =

Act of the Parliament of the United Kingdom

Offshore Safety Act 1992 (Note: Section 7(1).)
- Act of Parliament
- Parliament of the United Kingdom
- Long title: An Act to extend the application of Part I of the Health and Safety at Work etc. Act 1974; to increase the penalties for certain offences under that Part; to confer powers for preserving the security of supplies of petroleum and petroleum products; and for connected purposes.
- Citation: 1992 c. 15
- Introduced by: Michael Howard (Second Reading) (Commons)
- Territorial extent: England and Wales; Scotland; Northern Ireland (section 6); (Note: Section 7(4).)

Dates
- Royal assent: 6 March 1992
- Commencement: various (Note: Section 7(3).)

Other legislation
- Amends: Petroleum (Production) Act 1934; Continental Shelf Act 1964; Minerals Workings (Offshore Installations) Act 1971; Health and Safety at Work etc. Act 1974; Petroleum and Submarine Pipe-lines Act 1975; Oil and Gas (Enterprise) Act 1982; Gas Act 1986; Petroleum (Production) (Seaward Areas) Regulations 1988
- Amended by: Gas Act 1995; Petroleum Act 1998; Utilities Act 2000; Health and Safety (Offences) Act 2008
- Relates to: Health and Safety at Work, etc Act 1974

Status: Amended

Text of statute as originally enacted

Revised text of statute as amended

Text of the Offshore Safety Act 1992 as in force today (including any amendments) within the United Kingdom, from legislation.gov.uk.

The Offshore Safety Act 1992 (c. 15) is an act of the Parliament of the United Kingdom which extends the application of the Health and Safety at Work etc. Act 1974 to secure the safety, health and welfare of people on offshore installations. It increases the penalties of certain offences under the 1974 Act and empowers the Secretary of State to secure supplies of petroleum and petroleum products.

== Background ==
The safety, health and welfare of offshore workers in the United Kingdom's sector of the North Sea had been secured since 1971 by the Mineral Workings (Offshore Installations) Act 1971 and its subsidiary legislation. The Health and Safety at Work, etc. Act 1974 was administered on behalf of the Health and Safety Executive by the Petroleum Engineering Division of the Department of Energy.

By the late 1970s it was recognised that there was a potential conflict of interest between the roles within the Department of Energy as they applied offshore. The conflict arose because the Department of Energy was acting as both the offshore safety regulator and with the responsibility for developing the UK's energy resources. Furthermore, there were differences in approaches to safety specified in the Minerals Workings (Offshore Installations) Act 1971 and the Health and Safety at Work, etc. Act 1974. The regulations made under the 1971 Act were prescriptive and contained detailed guidance notes, which led to an approach to safety through the rigid application of the regulations. This contrasted with the goal setting approach espoused in the Health and Safety at Work, etc. Act 1974. The conflict of interest was examined in the Burgoyne Report in 1980 which supported the existing offshore approach.

Following the Piper Alpha disaster in 1988, the 106 recommendations of the Public Inquiry by Lord Cullen proposed fundamental changes to the regulation of offshore safety. These included the preparation and publication of Safety Cases, the strengthening of Safety Management Systems, independent assessment and survey, legislative changes and changing the regulatory body. The Offshore Safety Act legally implemented many of the Inquiry recommendations.

The regulation of offshore safety was transferred in 1991 from the Petroleum Engineering Division of the Department of Energy to the Health and Safety Executive.

== Offshore Safety Act 1992 ==
The Offshore Safety Act 1992 (1992 c. 15) received Royal Assent on 6 March 1992. Its long title is: ‘An Act to extend the application of Part I of the Health and Safety at Work etc. Act 1974; to increase the penalties for certain offences under that Part; to confer powers for preserving the security of supplies of petroleum and petroleum products; and for connected purposes.’

=== Provisions ===
The Act comprises 7 Sections and 2 Schedules:

- 1. Application of Part I of 1974 Act for offshore purposes. The purposes of the 1974 Act were amended to include securing the safety, health and welfare of people working offshore; the safety, safe construction, operation, and prevention of accidents on or near offshore installations and pipelines; and securing the safe dismantling and disposal of installations and pipelines. The remaining provisions of the Mineral Workings (Offshore Installations) Act 1971 were made relevant statutory provisions of the Offshore Safety Act.
- 2. Application of Part I for other purposes. Securing the safe construction and operation, preventing release from, and protecting the public from, pipelines and pipeline incidents.
- 3. Provisions consequential on sections 1 and 2. Amended legislation, mainly Sections that shall ‘cease to have effect’.
- 4. Increased penalties under Part I. Increases certain penalties prescribed in the Health and Safety at work etc. Act 1974.
- 5. Directions for preserving security of petroleum and petroleum products. Empowers the Secretary of State to give directions to preserve the security of any offshore installation, onshore terminal or oil refinery.
- 6. Corresponding provisions for Northern Ireland. The Act does not extend to Northern Ireland.
- 7. Short title, repeals, commencement and extent. Most of the Act commenced at Royal Assent.
- Schedule 1 Model Clauses Referred to in Section 3(2) Amendments to model clauses in Acts, Statutory Instruments, etc.
- Schedule 2 Repeals Sections of certain Acts repealed.

The Offshore Safety Act 1992 is still current (2020) legislation.

== Subsidiary legislation ==
A number of key offshore regulations support the aims of the act, these were enacted as Statutory Instruments.

- The Offshore Installations (Safety Case) Regulations 1992 Statutory Instrument 1992 No. 2885, these Regulations were repealed and replaced by:
- The Offshore Installations (Safety Case) Regulations 2005 Statutory Instrument 2005 No. 3117.
- The Offshore Installations (Prevention of Fire and Explosion, and Emergency Response) Regulations 1995 Statutory Instrument 1995 No. 743.
- The Offshore Installations and Pipeline Works (Management and Administration) Regulations 1995 Statutory Instrument 1995 No. 738.
- The Offshore Installations and Wells (Design and Construction etc) Regulations 1996 Statutory Instrument 1996 No. 913.
- The Offshore Installations (Offshore Safety Directive) (Safety Case etc.) Regulations 2015 Statutory Instrument 2015 No. 398.

The act and the subsidiary legislation were enforced by the Offshore Safety Division (now Offshore Energy) of the Health and Safety Executive.

=== Certification and verification ===
The prescriptive offshore certification regime had been introduced by the Offshore Installations (Construction and Survey) Regulations 1974. A Certifying Authority inspected the design, construction and operation of an installation against published guidance. This regime continued after the passage of the 1992 Act. It was replaced in 1996 with a goal-setting verification scheme by the Offshore Installations and Wells (Design and Construction etc) Regulations 1996.

== Later enactments ==
The Health and Safety (Offences) Act 2008 (c. 20) repealed section 4 of the act.

== See also ==
- Health and Safety Executive
- Piper Alpha
- Oil platform
- Offshore Installation Manager
- List of oil and gas fields of the North Sea
- North Sea Oil
