= Petroleum and Submarine Pipe-lines Act 1975 =

Act of the Parliament of the United Kingdom

Petroleum and Submarine Pipe-lines Act 1975 (Note: Section 49(1).)
- Act of Parliament
- Parliament of the United Kingdom
- Long title: An Act to establish the British National Oil Corporation and make provision with respect to the functions of the Corporation; to make further provision about licences to search for and get petroleum and about submarine pipe-lines and refineries; to authorise loans and guarantees in connection with the development of the petroleum resources of the United Kingdom and payments in respect of certain guarantees and loans by the Bank of England; and for purposes connected with the matters aforesaid.
- Citation: 1975 c. 74
- Introduced by: Eric Varley (second reading) (Commons)
- Territorial extent: United Kingdom (Note: Section 49(3).)

Dates
- Royal assent: 12 November 1975
- Commencement: 1 January 1976 (Note: Section 49(2). The Petroleum and Submarine Pipe-lines Act 1975 (Commencement) Order 1975 (SI 1976/2120).)
- Repealed: 15 February 1999 (Note: The Petroleum Act 1998 (Commencement No. 1) Order 1999 (SI 1999/161).)

Other legislation
- Amends: Petroleum (Production) Act 1934; Continental Shelf Act 1964; Petroleum (Production) Regulations 1966; Prevention of Oil Pollution Act 1971; Dumping at Sea Act 1974
- Amended by: Fatal Accidents and Sudden Deaths Inquiry (Scotland) Act 1976; Offshore Safety Act 1992
- Repealed by: Petroleum Act 1998

Status: Repealed

Text of statute as originally enacted

Revised text of statute as amended

The Petroleum and Submarine Pipe-lines Act 1975 (c. 74) was an act of the Parliament of the United Kingdom which addressed the licensing, ownership, exploitation, production, transportation, processing and refining of petroleum and petroleum products in the UK. Enacted in 1975 when the UK’s first North Sea oil was produced, the act aimed to provide greater public control of the oil industry. The act established the British National Oil Corporation and a National Oil Account; modified the conditions of petroleum licences; controlled the construction and use of underground pipelines; and controlled the development of oil refineries.

== Background ==
The incoming Labour government in October 1974 perceived significant deficiencies in the control and operation of the UK petroleum industry. One of Labour’s election manifesto pledges was to: "Take majority participation in all future oil licences and negotiate to achieve majority State participation in existing licences. Set up a British National Oil Corporation … Take new powers to control the pace of depletion, pipelines, exploration and development". The BNOC was to have several functions: holding production licences with private sector partners; commercial trading in downstream activities; exploration to establish the extent of reserves; providing expert services to the government; and acting as an agent of the government. The BNOC would provide resources to allow participation of the private sector in development of offshore oil. It would establish the conditions under which licences were awarded. It was also thought desirable that the government should have the power to make loans and to guarantee loans to oil companies developing discoveries in the North Sea.

Furthermore, there was perceived to be little control over the development of oil pipelines to avoid unnecessary proliferation, to minimise damage, and to reduce the risk of pollution. Neither was there control over the safety of pipelines and protection of people laying them under hazardous conditions.

Finally, the national policy on oil was generally not taken into account in decisions on oil refinery construction. To better exploit North Sea oil there was a need to have appropriate types of refining capacity.

The act aimed to address these issues and implement the proposals.

== Provisions ==
The act received royal assent on 12 November 1975. Its long title is: ‘An Act to establish the British National Oil Corporation and make provision with respect to the functions of the Corporation; to make further provision about licences to search for and get petroleum and about submarine pipe-lines and refineries; to authorise loans and guarantees in connection with the development of the petroleum resources of the United Kingdom and payments in respect of certain guarantees and loans by the Bank of England; and for purposes connected with the matters aforesaid.’

The act comprises 49 sections in 5 parts and 4 schedules:

- PART I The British National Oil Corporation
  - Constitution – Section 1 – Constitution of the Corporation
  - General functions of the Corporation – Sections 2 to 4 – General powers, duties and directions by the Secretary of State
  - Financial provisions – Sections 5 to 10 – General financial duties, borrowing powers etc., loans by the Secretary of State, guarantees, exemption from petroleum revenue tax and stamp duty, accounts and audit, duty of the Corporation
  - Miscellaneous – Sections 11 to 16 – provision of information, co-ordination of the Corporation and the British Gas Corporation, shares of NCB (Exploration) Ltd., annual report
- PART II Petroleum production licences
  - Sections 17 to 19 – modification of model clauses, retrospective application to existing licences
- PART III Submarine pipe-lines
  - Construction and use of pipe-lines – Sections 20 to 25 – control of construction and use, authorisations for pipe-lines, increases in capacity, rights to use pipe-lines, termination of authorisations, vesting
  - Safety and inspection – Sections 26 & 27 – safety and Inspectors
  - Criminal and civil liability – Sections 28 to 30 – enforcement, criminal proceedings, civil liability
  - Supplemental – Section 31 to 33 – exclusion, regulations, interpretation
- PART IV Refineries
  - Sections 34 to 39 – control of construction and extension, authorisations, planning permission, inspectors, offences, Scotland and Northern Ireland
- PART V Miscellaneous and General
  - Miscellaneous – Sections 40 to 44 – National Oil Account, payments to petroleum licence holders, loans to promote development, Burmah Oil Co. Ltd., extension of Mineral Workings (Offshore Installations) Act 1971
  - General – Sections 45 to 49 – amendments of enactments, orders and regulations, expenses, interpretation, commencement and extent
- Schedules
  - Schedule 1 – Additional provisions of British National Oil Corporation
  - Schedule 2 – Production licences for seaward areas
  - Schedule 3 – Production licences for landward areas
  - Schedule 4 – Authorisations for Section 20

== Consequences ==
The British National Oil Corporation was formally established on 13 November 1975. Lord Kearton was the chairman and chief executive, and Alastair Morton was one of the four managing directors. BNOC took over the oil and gas assets of NCB (Exploration) Ltd. a subsidiary of the National Coal Board. From February 1976 BNOC’s capital expenditure budget for the following 15 months was £450 million.

The BNOC could negotiate the right to buy back up to 51 per cent of an oil field’s production. In practice this was sold back to companies to refine. In 1976 BNOC obtained the majority of Burmah Oil Company’s UK interests in the Ninian and Thistle fields. BNOC thereby became an operating oil company. The Labour government had intended to buy its way into oil finds as a full licensee with a 51 per cent interest. However, the government decided to participate through negotiated agreements where it had the right to take at market price up to 51 per cent of crude oil and natural gas liquids, and any natural gas not purchased by the British Gas Corporation.

The Secretary of State for Energy made the Submarine Pipe-lines (Inspectors etc.) Regulations 1977 Statutory Instrument 1977 No. 835 and appointed inspectors into the Petroleum Engineering Division of the Department of Energy.

== Subsequent developments ==
Under the terms of the Oil and Gas (Enterprise) Act 1982 the British National Oil Corporation was split into an oil production organisation – Britoil – which was floated on the stock exchange in 1982 and 1985, and a residuary trading arm.

The Oil and Pipelines Act 1985 repealed Part 1 (Sections 1-16) of the 1975 Act and formally abolished the British National Oil Corporation and transferred its property, rights and liabilities to the Oil and Pipelines Agency.

The Petroleum Act 1987, made provision for the abandonment of offshore installations and submarine pipe-lines; it amended the Petroleum (Production) Act 1934; and amended the Petroleum and Submarine Pipe-lines Act 1975. The 1987 act repealed Sections 34 to 39 of the 1975 act relating to oil refineries.

The whole act was repealed by section 51(1) of, and part I of schedule 5 to, the Petroleum Act 1998, which came into force on 15 February 1999.

== See also ==
- Oil and gas industry in the United Kingdom
- North Sea Oil
- Petroleum refining in the United Kingdom
- UK oil pipeline network
- CLH Pipeline System
- Petroleum Act
