= Oil and Pipelines Agency =

Organization

- Abbreviation: OPA
- Predecessor: Government Pipelines and Storage System (GPSS)
- Formation: 1 December 1985
- Type: Statutory Corporation
- Headquarters: Weevil Lane, Gosport, Hampshire
- Region served: United Kingdom
- Members: Board Chairman, Chief Executive, MOD Sponsor, Non-Executive Directors
- Leader: Adrian Jackson (Chief Executive)
- Parent organization: Ministry of Defence
- Budget: Total expenditure £22,949,000 (2018/19)
- Staff: 19 (March 2009) 177 (March 2015) 142 (March 2019)

The Oil and Pipelines Agency (OPA) is a statutory corporation of the Ministry of Defence (MoD) in the United Kingdom. Its current role is to operate six coastal Oil Fuel Depots on behalf of the MoD. The OPA was also previously responsible for the management of the Government Pipelines and Storage System (GPSS), until its sale in 2015. The OPA is the MoD's professional expert on bulk fuel storage and transportation by pipeline.

== History ==
The OPA was formed at the end of 1985 under the Oil and Pipelines Act 1985 (c. 62). It was the successor organisation to the British National Oil Corporation (BNOC) in its responsibility for managing the Department of Energy's pipelines and storage depots. It was not initially responsible for either the Ministry of Defence spur pipelines or storage depots. Its statutory role was to be responsible for the safe, efficient, economic and effective management of the GPSS. The OPA's tasks included maximising private sector usage of the GPSS provided this did not impinge upon its primary purpose of supplying the required fuel for defence purposes and did not require capital investment from public funds. In 1989 the whole GPSS was amalgamated as a strategic defence asset under the responsibility of the Secretary of State for Defence and the MoD sponsored the OPA as its managing agent through Defence Equipment and Support.

Initially the GPSS had been operated under reimbursable, fully indemnified contracts by the British Pipeline Agency (BPA), Esso, Texaco and Shell. Starting in the late 1980s, OPA contracted out the GPSS in sections as these contracts were terminated. By 1994 the entire GPSS had been let under fixed priced contracts.

In February 2012, Costain was awarded a three-year contract to operate and maintain the entire GPSS on behalf of the OPA. In August 2014, the contract was extended for a further year, until April 2016.

In May 2012 the UK Government announced plans sell all or part of the GPSS and legislation to enable it to do so was included in the Energy Act 2013. The period leading up to the selling off of the GPSs saw a nine-fold increase in the size of the OPA from 19 staff in March 2009 to 177 in March 2015. The cost of running the agency also increased over the same period from £2.2million in 2008/9 to £10.4million in 2014/15.

In March 2015, the government announced it had agreed to sell the GPSS to Compañía Logística de Hidrocarburos (CLH) for £82m, with CLH taking over operation of the GPSS on 30 April 2015. A contractual agreement between the MoD and CLH ensured military fuel requirements continued to be met using the GPSS. The residual OPA remained to manage 6 Naval Oil Fuel Depots not included in the sale. It was stated that the GPSS would be sold for £82 million but also that the over the next ten years the MoD would pay £237 million for the use of the system. MoD had previously paid nothing for the use of the GPSS and also gained from the surplus of income over expenditure that OPA used to generate from running the GPSS.

== Responsibilities ==
The current responsibilities of the OPA include: to receive, store and deliver marine fuel to meet the MoD ‘s requirements; to manage, operate and maintain the Oil Fuel Depots; to manage and maintain the salt caverns at Plumley and Cape of Good Hope (Cheshire) Petroleum Storage Depot (PSD); and to attract third-party customers.

=== Corporate structure ===
The management board comprises an independent Non-executive Chairman appointed by the Minister; a Chief Executive appointed by the Minister in consultation with the Chairman and MOD Sponsor; the MOD Sponsor; and two non-executive members.

The first Board (with effect from 1 December 1985) were: G. W. Dunkerley (Chairman), K. J. Vaughan (Chief Executive), O. H. Heald (Non-executive member), and C. G. Finch (Non-executive member).

In 2019 the Board comprised: Graham Ellis (Chairman since 2012), Adrian Jackson (Chief Executive and Accounting Officer since 2015), Rachel Pearson (MOD Sponsor), Matt Harrison (Non-executive Director), and Trevor Woolley (Non-executive Director). The Company Secretary was Marie Edwards.

In January 2024 the Board comprised: Adrian Jackson, Chief Executive; Tim Backhouse, Chief Financial Officer; Paul Grange, Chief Operating Officer; Ian Lindsay, Engineering Director; Sue Jemmett, Human Resources Director; Lisa England, Compliance and Risk Director; Mark Jessop, Programme Director.

=== Oil Fuel Depots and storage facilities ===
Oil Fuel Depots (OFD) and storage facilities
Facility	Location	Co-ordinates	Notes
OFD Campbeltown	Campbeltown, Argyll and Bute	55°25'01.2"N 5°34'17.9"W	South side of Campbeltown Loch on the Kintyre peninsula
OFD Garelochhead	Garelochhead, Argyll and Bute	56°04'14.5"N 4°49'41.5"W	East side of Gare Loch to the north of Faslane Naval Base
OFD Gosport	Gosport, Hampshire	50°47'56.8"N 1°07'00.4"W	West side of Portsmouth Harbour opposite Portsmouth Naval Base
OFD Loch Ewe	Drumchork, Highland	57°49'38.8"N 5°35'01.1"W	East side of Loch Ewe on the north-west coast of Scotland
OFD Loch Striven	Knockdow, Argyll and Bute	55°53'44.1"N 5°02'56.7"W	East side of Loch Striven on the Cowal peninsula
PSD Plumley and Cape of Good Hope	Plumley, Cheshire West and Chester	53°15'47.0"N 2°24'48.8"W	34 underground salt caverns for oil storage
OFD Thanckes	Torpoint, Cornwall	50°22'57.7"N 4°11'40.0"W	West side of River Tamar opposite Devonport Naval Base
OFD Senoko	Sembawang, Singapore	1°27′46.8″N 103°49′59.7″E	South side of the Straits of Johor. The Agency took over responsibility in 2022

== See also ==
- British Pipeline Agency
- Exolum Pipeline System
