= Britoil =

British oil company

Britoil plc
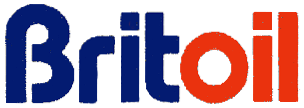
- Formerly: British National Oil Corporation (BNOC)
- Type: PLC
- Industry: Petroleum
- Founded: 1975
- Defunct: 1988; 38 years ago
- Fate: Acquired by BP in 1988
- Headquarters: Glasgow, Scotland, U.K.
- Key people: Sir Philip Shelbourne (Former Chairman); David Walker (Former CEO)
- Products: Crude oil, Natural gas

Britoil plc was a privatised British oil company producing oil in the North Sea. It was once a constituent of the FTSE 100 Index. It was formed from privatisation of the upstream assets of the British National Oil Corporation (BNOC), a state-owned company, in 1982. It was acquired by BP in 1988, becoming a brand of it.

== History ==
The British National Oil Corporation (BNOC), a state-owned body, was originally formed in 1975 under the provisions of the Petroleum and Submarine Pipe-lines Act 1975. Its objective was to maintain adequate oil supply levels. It was also established as an instrument of public participation and control in the North Sea gas and oil development.

Britoil's interest in UK oil and gas fields in 1982 was as follows.

Britoil interest in UK oil and gas fields in 1982
Field	Britoil interest (%)
Thistle	18.93
Dunlin	9.77
Ninian	20.73
Statfjord	5.30
Murchison	27.92
Beatrice	28.00
South Brae	30.00
Hutton	20.00
Clyde	51.00
Viking (gas)	50.00
Andrew	100.00

As a result of the Oil and Gas (Enterprise) Act 1982, BNOC was split to enable the trading sector of the company BNOC to remain nationalised whilst the oil exploration and production sector, Britoil, was a limited liability company. On 4 March it was incorporated as Britoil Limited.

In November 1982, 51% of Governmental shares in Britoil were sold off, but this was substantially under-subscribed. The resultant losses were carried by underwriters. The remaining Government minority shareholding in Britoil was sold in November 1985 for £434 million, ensuring it kept a "Golden Share" in order to veto any outsourcing attempts. The collapse in world oil prices globally, combined with the possession of Britoil's majority share by BP meant that the golden share was sold to British Petroleum in 1988.

Britoil's Production entitlement and financial summary was as follows:

Year	Production entitlement		Turnover, £ million	Profit (loss) before tax, £ million	Profit (loss) after tax, £ million
Year	Oil, 1000 bbl/d	Gas, million cubic feet/day	Turnover, £ million	Profit (loss) before tax, £ million	Profit (loss) after tax, £ million
1977	–	311	28	(43)	(31)
1978	10	257	54	(35)	(26)
1979	64	215	267	69	33
1980	85	229	506	256	67
1981	117	164	832	435	73
1982			1088	660	103
1983			1252	586	143
1984			1549	688	169
1985 (6 months)			968	365	91

In the same year, the company had been subject of an attempted £23 million fraud by one of its own cashiers.

=== Key people ===
Chairman and Chief Executive: Baron Kearton (Christopher Frank Kearton) (1975–79), Ronald Utiger (1979–1980), Sir Philip Shelbourne (July 1980 – 1988), Sir Robin Duthie (1988–90).

Ian Clark was Britoil joint managing director until the BP takeover.

After the splitting off of Britoil Lord Croham, the deputy chairman of BNOC, became chairman of BNOC's trading activities (1982–85).

== See also ==
- List of oil exploration and production companies
