= Mineral Workings (Offshore Installations) Act 1971 =

Act of the Parliament of the United Kingdom

Mineral Workings (Offshore Installations) Act 1971 (Note: Section 14(1).)
- Act of Parliament
- Parliament of the United Kingdom
- Long title: An Act to provide for the safety, health and welfare of persons on installations concerned with the underwater exploitation and exploration of mineral resources in the waters in or surrounding the United Kingdom, and generally for the safety of such installations and the prevention of accidents on or near them.
- Citation: 1971 c. 61
- Introduced by: Earl Ferrers (second reading) (Lords)
- Territorial extent: United Kingdom (Note: Section 14(3).)

Dates
- Royal assent: 27 July 1971
- Commencement: 1 May 1972 (Note: Section 14(2). The Mineral Workings (Offshore Installations) Act 1971 (Commencement) Order 1972 (SI 1972/644).)
Other legislation
Amended by	Prevention of Oil Pollution Act 1971; Northern Ireland Constitution Act 1973; Criminal Procedure (Scotland) Act 1975; Fatal Accidents and Sudden Deaths Inquiry (Scotland) Act 1976; Fatal Accidents (Northern Ireland) Order 1977; Civil Aviation Act 1982; Oil and Gas (Enterprise) Act 1982; Criminal Justice Act 1982; Fines and Penalties (Northern Ireland) Order 1984; Offshore Safety Act 1992; Offshore Safety (Repeals and Modifications) Regulations 1993; Offshore Safety (Repeals and Modifications) Regulations (Northern Ireland) 1993; Offshore Installations and Pipeline Works (Management and Administration) Regulations 1995; Offshore Installations and Pipeline Works (Management and Administration) Regulations (Northern Ireland) 1995; Offshore Installations and Wells (Design and Construction, etc.) Regulations 1996

Status: Amended

Text of statute as originally enacted

Revised text of statute as amended

Text of the Mineral Workings (Offshore Installations) Act 1971 as in force today (including any amendments) within the United Kingdom, from legislation.gov.uk.

The Mineral Workings (Offshore Installations) Act 1971 (c. 61) is an act of the Parliament of the United Kingdom which provided for the safety, health and welfare of people on installations undertaking the exploitation of, and exploration for, mineral resources in UK offshore waters.

== Background ==
The exploration for natural gas under the United Kingdom's sector of the North Sea began in 1964. The first gas was found in September 1965 by the self-elevating drilling rig Sea Gem. Tragically, on 27 December 1965 Sea Gem collapsed and sank 43 miles east of the Humber. Thirteen of the crew of 32 were killed. A tribunal was appointed in February 1967 to establish the circumstances of the accident. The hearing lasted 29 days, and the tribunal report was published on 26 July 1967. The report identified that statutory provisions for regulating the safety of offshore installations, together with credible sanctions, should be available for installations working on the United Kingdom continental shelf. The Mineral Workings (Offshore Installations) Act 1971 enacted these measures which gave the Government the powers to regulate the safety, health and welfare on offshore installations.

== Mineral Workings (Offshore Installations) Act 1971 ==
The Mineral Workings (Offshore Installations) Act 1971 received royal assent on 27 July 1971. Its long title is: ‘An Act to provide for the safety, health and welfare of persons on installations concerned with the underwater exploitation and exploration of mineral resources in the waters in or surrounding the United Kingdom, and generally for the safety of such installations and the prevention of accidents on or near them.’

The 1971 act was enabling legislation giving the Secretary of State the power to make appropriate Regulations.

=== Provisions ===
The act comprised 14 sections and a schedule

1. Application of Act – applies to underwater exploration and exploitation

2. Registration of offshore installations – power of the Secretary of State to make Regulations for Registration

3. Construction and survey regulations for offshore installations – power of the Secretary of State to make Regulations for construction and survey

4. Managers of offshore installations – originally ‘Masters’’ – under the charge of an appointed person.

5. Managers of offshore installations, further provisions – originally ‘Masters’’ – ‘shall not be absent’, responsibilities, disobedience and fines, not to be used in an unsafe manner, emergencies, securing safety

6. Safety regulations – power of the Secretary of State to make Regulations for safety, health and welfare, appointment of inspectors

7. Regulations: general provisions – consultation, offences, penalties

8. Application of existing law to offshore installations in territorial waters and designated areas – Continental Shelf Act 1964, Civil Aviation Act 1949

9. Offences: general provisions – defences, proceedings, powers of Constables

10. Prosecutions – offences, application of various Acts

11. Civil liability for breach of statutory duty – liabilities of concession owners

12. Interpretation – Meanings of words and phrases.

13. Financial provisions – expenses incurred by the Secretary of State.

14. Short title, commencement and saving – to be made by Statutory Instrument (see below), Parliament of Northern Ireland

Schedule. Subject matter of regulations – measures, provisions, no-one under the age of 18 to be offshore, accidents, medical treatment, accommodation, inspectors and inquiries, official logbook.

=== Enactment ===
The 1971 act was brought into effect by The Mineral Workings (Offshore Installations) Act 1971 (Commencement) Order 1972 (SI 1972/644 (C. 11)). This states that "All the provisions of the Act other than sections 4 and 5 shall come into force on 1 May 1972 and sections 4 and 5 of the Act shall come into force on 31st August 1972."

== Consequential legislation ==
The 1971 act empowered the Secretary of State to make a wide range of regulations, a sample of these include:

- The Offshore Installations (Registration) Regulations 1972 (SI 1972/702)
- The Offshore Installations (Managers) Regulations 1972 (SI 1972/703)
- The Offshore Installations (Logbooks and Registration of Death) Regulations 1972 (SI 1972/1542)
- The Offshore Installations (Public Inquiries) Regulations 1974 (SI 1974/338)
- The Offshore Installations (Construction and Survey) Regulations 1974 (SI 1974/289)
- The Offshore Installations (Emergency Procedures) Regulations 1976 (SI 1976/1542)
- The Offshore Installations (Operational Safety, Health and Welfare) Regulations 1976 Statutory Instrument (SI 1976/1019)
- The Offshore Installations (Life-saving Appliances) Regulations 1977 Statutory Instrument (SI 1977/486)
- The Offshore Installations (Fire-fighting Equipment) Regulations 1978 Statutory Instrument (SI 1978/611)

=== Certification ===
The Offshore Installations (Construction and Survey) Regulations 1974 (SI 1974/289) established a certification regime. Offshore duty holders (oil and gas companies) appointed a Certifying Authority to inspect the design, construction and operation of their installation(s) against published guidance. The Certifying Authorities were the major ship classification societies: Lloyd's Register of Shipping, Bureau Veritas, Germanisher Lloyd's, Det Norske Veritas, American Bureau of Shipping. The Petroleum Engineering Division of the Department of Energy audited the Certifying Authorities, for compliance with their duties under the legislation and the against the guidance.

== Subsequent legislation ==
After the Health and Safety at Work etc. Act 1974 (c. 37) was enacted its provisions were applied offshore by The Health and Safety at Work etc. Act 1974 (Application outside Great Britain) Order 1977 (SI 1977/1232).

Following the Piper Alpha disaster and the Inquiry by Lord Cullen the Offshore Safety Act 1992 (c. 15) was enacted to better regulate offshore safety. The provisions of the Mineral Workings (Offshore Installations) Act 1971 were made relevant statutory provisions of the Offshore Safety Act 1992.

As of August 2020, sections 1 to 6, 8, 10, and the schedule of the Mineral Workings (Offshore Installations) Act 1971 have been repealed by subsequent legislation. Only sections 7, 9, 11, 12, 13, and 14 are still in force.

== See also ==
- Sea Gem
- Piper Alpha
- Heath and Safety at Work etc. Act 1974
- Health and Safety Executive
- Oil platform
- Offshore Installation Manager
- List of oil and gas fields of the North Sea
- North Sea Oil
