= Continental Shelf Act 1964 (United Kingdom) =

Act of the Parliament of the United Kingdom

Continental Shelf Act 1964 (Note: Section 13.)
- Act of Parliament
- Parliament of the United Kingdom
- Long title: An Act to make provision as to the exploration and exploitation of the continental shelf; to enable effect to be given to certain provisions of the Convention on the High Seas done in Geneva on 29th April 1958; and for matters connected with those purposes.
- Citation: 1964 c. 29
- Territorial extent: United Kingdom

Dates
- Royal assent: 15 April 1964
- Commencement: 15 April 1964 (Note: The Acts of Parliament (Commencement) Act 1793.)

Other legislation
- Amends: Petroleum (Production) Act 1934; Submarine Telegraph Act 1885
- Amended by: Statute Law Revision (Consequential Repeals) Act 1965; Transfer of Functions (Shipping and Construction of Ships) Order 1965; Minister of Technology Order 1969; Oil in Navigable Waters Act 1971; Prevention of Oil Pollution Act 1971; Gas Act 1972; Northern Ireland Constitution Act 1973; Statute Law (Repeals) Act 1974; Petroleum and Submarine Pipe-lines Act 1975; Energy Act 1976; Oil and Gas (Enterprise) Act 1982; Coal Industry Act 1987; Petroleum Act 1987; Offshore Safety Act 1992; Coal Industry Act 1994; Wireless Telegraphy Act 1998; Petroleum Act 1998; Communications Act 2003; Marine and Coastal Access Act 2009; Environmental Permitting (England and Wales) Regulations 2010; Energy Act 2011; Environmental Permitting (England and Wales) (Amendment) Regulations 2011; Environmental Permitting (England and Wales) Regulations 2016; Environmental Authorisations (Scotland) Regulations 2018 (Consequential Modifications) Order 2021
- Relates to: Submarine Telegraph Act 1885; Petroleum (Production) Act 1934; Ministry of Fuel and Power Act 1945; Coal Industry Nationalisation Act 1946; Gas Act 1948; Companies Act 1948; Coast Protection Act 1949; Oil in Navigable Waters Act 1955; Radioactive Substances Act 1960

Status: Amended

Text of statute as originally enacted

Revised text of statute as amended

Text of the Continental Shelf Act 1964 (United Kingdom) as in force today (including any amendments) within the United Kingdom, from legislation.gov.uk.

The Continental Shelf Act 1964 (c. 29) is an act of the Parliament of the United Kingdom that governs drilling for oil on the continental shelf around the British Isles. It extended the land regime to areas outside UK territorial waters, where international law recognised the UK right to the seabed, subsoil and natural resources.

== Provisions ==
The following is a summary of key provisions of the act.

- s 1(1) 'Any rights exercisable by the United Kingdom outside territorial waters with respect to the sea bed and subsoil and their natural resources, except so far as they are exercisable in relation to coal, are hereby vested in Her Majesty.' (3) key licensing provisions from the 1934 act to the continental shelf (6) duty of SS for ‘effective and co-ordinated development of such resources’ in s 1(1) of Ministry of Fuel and Power Act 1945 (8 & 9 Geo. 6. c. 19) extends to resources outside GB. (7) can make orders.
- s 7, radioactive substances under Environmental Permitting (England and Wales) Regulations 2016 (SI 2016/1154) and PA 1998 s 11.
- s 8, submarine cables, if damaged, lead to punishment in the same way as under the Submarine Telegraph Act 1885 (48 & 49 Vict. c. 49) s 3. (1A) reference to sub-marine and cable pipe lines is defined in s 41(3) of the Marine and Coastal Access Act 2009 (exclusive economic zone).
- s 9 (repealed by the Energy Act 1976 of 1976) contained a power of the Gas Board (then British Gas) to purchase at a reasonable price, all natural gas first.
- s 11(1) proceedings for offences can be taken in the UK (2) 'Where a body corporate is guilty of such an offence and the offence is proved to have been committed with the consent or connivance of, or to be attributable to any neglect on the part of, any director, manager, secretary or other similar officer of the body corporate or any person who was purporting to act in any such capacity he, as well as the body corporate, shall be guilty of the offence and shall be liable to be proceeded against and punished accordingly. In this subsection, "director" in relation to a body corporate established for the purpose of carrying on under national ownership any industry or part of an industry or undertaking, being a body corporate whose affairs are managed by its members, means a member of that body corporate.'

== Subsequent developments ==
Section 8(2) of the act was repealed by section 1 of, and part XI of the schedule to, the Statute Law (Repeals) Act 1974, which came into force on 27 June 1974.

== See also ==
- UK enterprise law
- Oil and gas in the UK
