= Offshore Petroleum Development (Scotland) Act 1975 =

Act of the Parliament of the United Kingdom

Offshore Petroleum Development (Scotland) Act 1975 (Note: Section 20(1).)
- Act of Parliament
- Parliament of the United Kingdom
- Long title: An Act to provide for the acquisition by the Secretary of State of land in Scotland for purposes relating to exploration for and exploitation of offshore petroleum; to enable the Secretary of State to carry out works and facilitate operations for those purposes; to regulate such operations in certain sea areas; to provide for the reinstatement of land used for those purposes; and for purposes connected with those matters.
- Citation: 1975 c. 8
- Introduced by: Lord Hughes 28 January 1975 (second reading) (Lords)
- Territorial extent: Scotland; England and Wales (section 7(6)); Northern Ireland (section 7(6)); (Note: Section 20(5).)

Dates
- Royal assent: 13 March 1975
- Commencement: 13 March 1975 (Note: The Acts of Parliament (Commencement) Act 1793.)
Other legislation
Amended by	Scottish Development Agency Act 1975; Oil and Gas (Enterprise) Act 1982; Food and Environment Protection Act 1985; Pilotage Act 1987; Enterprise and New Towns (Scotland) Act 1990; Planning (Consequential Provisions) (Scotland) Act 1997; Petroleum Act 1998; Abolition of Feudal Tenure etc. (Scotland) Act 2000

Status: Amended

Text of statute as originally enacted

Revised text of statute as amended

Text of the Offshore Petroleum Development (Scotland) Act 1975 as in force today (including any amendments) within the United Kingdom, from legislation.gov.uk.

The Offshore Petroleum Development (Scotland) Act 1975 (c. 8) is an act of the Parliament of the United Kingdom which facilitated the onshore construction of offshore oil platforms for the UK Continental Shelf. Its provisions permitted the acquisition of land; the regulation of sea-based operations; the granting of licences for construction; the reinstatement of land; and financial provisions.

== Background ==
In 1975 the UK government recognised that the development of offshore oil resources would make an important contribution to the UK economy, particularly at a time when the cost of imported crude oil was increasing rapidly. An immediate objective for the government and the oil industry was the building of offshore oil platforms; their construction required significant areas of coastal land. The (Note: Section 20(1).) addressed these issues; it had three purposes: to ensure that land was available for onshore construction; to ensure that construction was properly regulated; and that land was restored after use.

These purposes were enacted by the (Note: Section 20(1).) in detail as follows. Sections 1 and 2 and Schedules 1 and 2 of the Act empowered the Secretary of State for Scotland to acquire any land in Scotland for the purpose of platform construction. Sections 3 to 7 and Schedule 3 allowed the control and regulation of sea-based operations. The Secretary of State was empowered to make Sea Designation Orders and to grant licences for operations. Sections 8 and 9 required the reinstatement of land after construction activities, and provided planning authorities with powers to require a developer to reinstate land. Section 10 empowered the Secretary of State to carry out works on land for construction purposes or to contribute to their cost. Section 11 enabled the Secretary of State to make loans, or to guarantee the repayment of loans, to assist with construction operations. Section 12 enabled an acquisition order to be made in relation to any land, even land which was held "inalienably". The other substantive Sections of the Act included provisions for compensation for nuisance; to require information about land to be made available; and the rights of entry; and financial provisions.

The Government regarded the act as a significant part of its oil strategy. The oil field developments encompassed by this legislation were crucial to the UK economy but had significant local social and environmental implications. The Act allowed developments to proceed with appropriate controls and safeguards.

== Provisions ==
The act (1975 c. 8) received Royal Assent on 13 March 1975. Its long title is ‘An Act to provide for the acquisition by the Secretary of State of land in Scotland for purposes relating to exploration for and exploitation of offshore petroleum; to enable the Secretary of State to carry out works and facilitate operations for those purposes; to regulate such operations in certain sea areas; to provide for the reinstatement of land used for those purposes; and for purposes connected with those matters.'

The act comprises 20 sections under 4 headings and 3 schedules:

- Acquisition of land for purposes of offshore petroleum development
  - Section 1. Acquisition of land for purposes connected with offshore petroleum
  - Section 2. Extinction of rights affecting land
- Designated sea areas
  - Section 3. Designated sea areas
  - Section 4. Licences in relation to operations in designated sea areas
  - Section 5. Terms and effect, etc. of licences under s. 4
  - Section 6. Regulations for protection and control of operations in designated sea areas
  - Section 7. Execution and enforcement of regulations, etc. in designated sea areas
- Reinstatement of land
  - Section 8. Reinstatement of land held under Act
  - Section 9. Arrangements to ensure reinstatement of other land developed for purposes connected with offshore petroleum
- Miscellaneous and general
  - Section 10. Execution of works and disposal of land held under Act
  - Section 11. Loans and guarantees by Secretary of State for facilitating relevant operations
  - Section 12. Supplementary provisions as to acquisition and appropriation of land
  - Section 13. Compensation for adjoining owners and exclusion of actions for nuisance
  - Section 14. Power to require information as to interests in land
  - Section 15. Rights of entry
  - Section 16. Application to Crown land
  - Section 17. Financial provisions
  - Section 18. Savings
  - Section 19. Orders, etc.
  - Section 20. Short title, interpretation and extent
- Schedules
  - Schedule 1. Making and Revocation of Expedited Acquisition Orders
  - Schedule 2. Effect of Expedited Acquisition Orders
  - Schedule 3. Making and Revocation of Sea Designation Orders

== Effects and Status ==
By July 1975 the investment under the Act totalled £3.5 million.

The provisions of the Act included the following construction yards which were in use from the mid-1970s to the early-1990s.

Oil installation construction sites in Scotland
Location	Local Authority (current)	Fabrication contractor	Installations constructed
Ardersier	Highlands	McDermott Scotland	Brae A & B, Clyde, Heather, Hutton TLP, NW Hutton, Morecambe Bay, Murchison, Piper A & B, Rough, Saltire, Scott
Ardyne Point	Argyll and Bute	McAlpine / Sea Tank	Brent C, Frigg, South Cormorant
Dundee	Dundee	Davy Offshore	Emerald
Hunterston	North Ayrshire	Ayrshire Marine Constructors	Maureen
Invergordon / Cromarty Firth	Highlands	Peterhead Engineering, Scottish Rig Repairers	Argyll, Crawford
Kishorn Yard	Highlands	HDN Offshore Structures, Howard Doris	Maureen, Morecambe Bay, Ninian Central
Methil Yard	Fife	Redpath de Groot Caledonian	Alwyn, Auk, Beatrice B, Beryl B, Brae East, Brent A, Bruce, Dunbar, Fulmar, Gannet, Kittiwake, Morecambe Bay, North Cormorant, Nelson, Rough, Tartan, Tern
Nigg Bay	Highlands	Highland Fabricators	Andrew, Arbroath, CATS, Eider, North Everest, Forties C & D, Hutton TLP, Lomond, Magnus, Miller, Ninian North & South
Portavadie	Argyll and Bute	Sea Platform Constructors	None built
Stornoway	Comhairle nan Eilean Siar	Lewis Offshore	Beatrice C, Buchan

The act is still (in 2020) in force. Only minor amendments and textural changes have been made by subsequent legislation.

== See also ==
- Petroleum Act
