= Petroleum (Production) Act 1934 =

Act of the Parliament of the United Kingdom

Petroleum (Production) Act 1934 (Note: Section 11(1).)
- Act of Parliament
- Parliament of the United Kingdom
- Long title: An Act to vest in the Crown the property in petroleum and natural gas within Great Britain and to make provision with respect to the searching and boring for and getting of petroleum and natural gas, and for purposes connected with the matters aforesaid.
- Citation: 24 & 25 Geo. 5. c. 36
- Introduced by: President of the Board of Trade Walter Runciman (Second Reading) (Commons); Secretary of State for Air the Marquess of Londonderry (Second Reading) 19 April 1934 (Lords)
- Territorial extent: England and Wales; Scotland; (Note: Section 11(3).)

Dates
- Royal assent: 12 July 1934
- Commencement: 12 July 1934 (Note: The Acts of Parliament (Commencement) Act 1793.)
- Repealed: 15 February 1999 (Note: The Petroleum Act 1998 (Commencement No. 1) Order 1999 (SI 1999/161).)
Other legislation
Amends	Mining Industry Act 1926
Repeals/revokes	Petroleum (Production) Act 1918
Amended by	Ministry of Fuel and Power Act 1945; Statutory Instruments Act 1946; Railway and Canal Commission (Abolition) Act 1949; Continental Shelf Act 1964; Science and Technology Act 1965; Mines (Working Facilities And Support) Act 1966; Petroleum and Submarine Pipe-lines Act 1975; Interpretation Act 1978; Statute Law (Repeals) Act 1978; Oil and Gas (Enterprise) Act 1982; Petroleum Act 1987; Offshore Safety Act 1992
Repealed by	Petroleum Act 1998

Status: Repealed

Text of statute as originally enacted

Revised text of statute as amended

The Petroleum (Production) Act 1934 (24 & 25 Geo. 5. c. 36) was an act of the Parliament of the United Kingdom which clarified the ownership of underground petroleum, vesting it in the Crown. It made provision for searching and boring for and getting (producing) petroleum and natural gas, under appropriate licenses.

== Background ==
Before 1934 there was a lack of clarity about the ownership of oil beneath a property. For example, in 1919 the Attorney-General was asked in Parliament whether the surface owner also owned the oil beneath their land. The Attorney-General acknowledged that opinions differed, but was inclined to the view that the surface owner is the owner of oil beneath the land. The 1934 act clarified the position and vested underground oil in the Crown.

The Petroleum (Production) Act 1918 (8 & 9 Geo. 5. c. 52) had required persons wishing to prospect for oil to obtain a license from the Board of Trade. However between 1918 and 1934 only seven licenses were issued and by 1934 only three were in force. Furthermore, oil prices were generally falling during the 1920s thereby discouraging exploration.

== Provisions ==
The act received royal assent on 12 July 1934. Its long title is: 'An Act to vest in the Crown the property in petroleum and natural gas within Great Britain and to make provision with respect to the searching and boring for and getting of petroleum and natural gas, and for purposes connected with the matters aforesaid.'

The act comprises 11 sections and a schedule:

- Section 1. Vesting petroleum in the Crown
- Section 2. Licenses to search for and get petroleum
- Section 3. Compulsory rights to enter land
- Section 4. Supply of natural gas
- Section 5. Accounting for receipts and expenditure
- Section 6. Power to make regulations
- Section 7. Power to inspect plans of mines
- Section 8. Powers and duties of the Board of Trade
- Section 9. Definition of minerals
- Section 10. Savings
- Section 11. Short title, repeal and extent
- Schedule

== Effects ==
The act vested ownership of petroleum in its natural condition in underground strata in the Crown. The Board of Trade was empowered to issue licenses to persons to search for, bore and produce petroleum. Natural gas could be supplied to premises by license holders. The Board of Trade was empowered to make regulations specifying how to apply for a license, the fees payable, the size and shape of the permitted area of license, and model clauses. The Board of Trade was empowered to inspect the position of mine workings. The Petroleum (Production) Act 1918 (8 & 9 Geo. 5. c. 52) was repealed.

The act was seen as a sensible measure: encouraging exploration, but through licensing, preventing wildcat drilling.

Section 6 of the act gave the minister power to make regulations. The following year the Petroleum (Production) Regulations 1935 were published and contained Model Clauses which were incorporated into licences.

In 1959 Shell applied to the Ministry of Power for a licence to explore for gas in the North Sea. The company asked whether the Petroleum (Production) Act 1934, could be extended beyond territorial waters to areas of the North Sea which would fall within the jurisdiction of the British Government. The view of the ministry was that licences could not be issued until legislation was enacted.

== Subsequent developments ==
The whole act was repealed by section 51(1) of, and part I of schedule 5 to, the Petroleum Act 1998, which came into force on 15 February 1999.

== See also ==
- Oil and gas industry in the United Kingdom
- Petroleum Act
