= Coal gas =

Manufactured gaseous fuel

Coal gas is a flammable gaseous fuel made from coal and supplied to the user via a piped distribution system originating from a gasworks. It is produced when coal is heated strongly in the absence of air. Town gas is a more general term referring to manufactured gaseous fuels produced for sale to consumers and municipalities.

The original coal gas was produced by the coal gasification reaction, and the burnable component consisted of a mixture of carbon monoxide and hydrogen in roughly equal quantities by volume. Thus, coal gas is highly toxic. Other compositions contain additional calorific gases such as methane, produced by the Fischer–Tropsch process, and volatile hydrocarbons together with small quantities of non-calorific gases such as carbon dioxide and nitrogen.

Created as a by-product of the coking process, its use developed during the 19th and early 20th centuries tracking the Industrial Revolution and urbanization. By-products from the production process included coal tars and ammonia, which were important raw materials (or "chemical feedstock") for the dye and chemical industry with a wide range of artificial dyes being made from coal gas and coal tar. Facilities where the gas was produced were often known as a manufactured gas plant (MGP) or a gasworks.

The production process differs from other methods used to generate gaseous fuels known variously as manufactured gas, syngas, Dowson gas, and producer gas. These gases are made by partial combustion of a wide variety of feedstocks in some mixture of air, oxygen, or steam, to reduce the latter to hydrogen and carbon monoxide although some destructive distillation may also occur.

Before the development of natural gas supply and transmission—during the 1940s and 1950s in the United States and during the late 1960s and 1970s in the United Kingdom and Australia—almost all gas for fuel and lighting was manufactured from coal. Town gas was supplied to households via municipally owned piped distribution systems. At the time, a frequent method of committing suicide was the inhalation of gas from an unlit oven. With the head and upper body placed inside the appliance, the concentrated carbon monoxide would kill quickly. Sylvia Plath ended her life with this method.

In the United Kingdom the discovery of large reserves of natural gas, or sea gas as it was known colloquially, in the Southern North Sea off the coasts of Norfolk and Yorkshire in 1965 led to the conversion or replacement of most of Britain's gas cookers and gas heaters from the late 1960s onwards, the process being completed by the late 1970s. Any residual gas lighting found in homes being converted was either capped off at the meter or, more usually, removed altogether. As of 2023, some gas street lighting remained, mainly in central London and the Royal Parks.

== Manufacturing processes ==
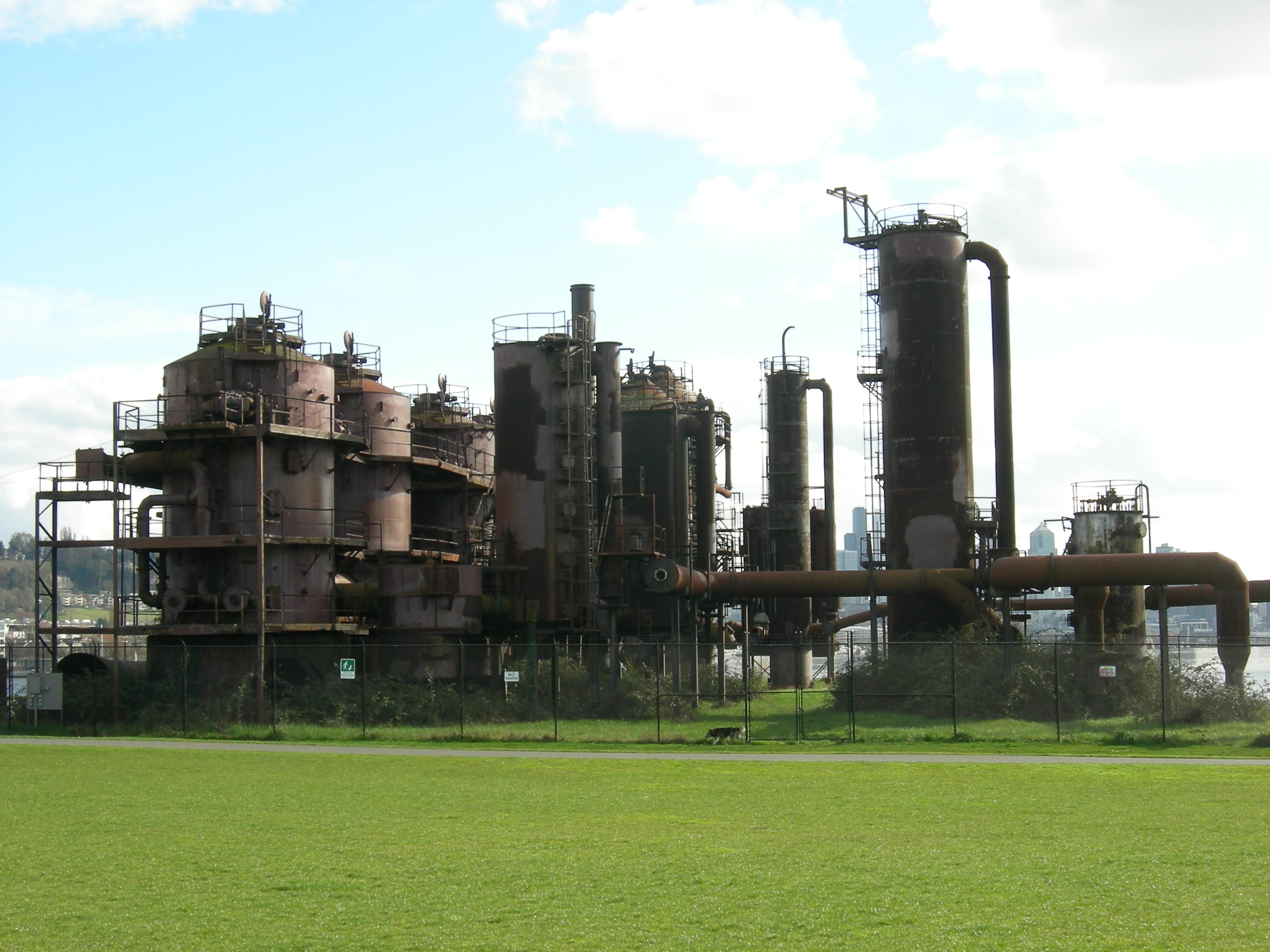
Gas Works Park, Seattle, preserves most of the equipment for making coal gas. This is the only such plant surviving in the United States.

Manufactured gas can be made by two processes: carbonization or gasification. Carbonization refers to the devolatilization of an organic feedstock to yield gas and char. Gasification is the process of subjecting a feedstock to chemical reactions that produce gas.

The first process used was the carbonization and partial pyrolysis of coal. The off gases liberated in the high-temperature carbonization (coking) of coal in coke ovens were collected, scrubbed and used as fuel. Depending on the goal of the plant, the desired product was either a high-quality coke for metallurgical use, with the gas being a side product, or the production of a high-quality gas, with coke being the side product. Coke plants are typically associated with metallurgical facilities such as smelters or blast furnaces, while gas works typically served urban areas.

A facility used to manufacture coal gas, carburetted water gas (CWG), and oil gas is today generally referred to as a manufactured gas plant (MGP).

In the early years of MGP operations, the goal of a utility gas works was to produce the greatest amount of illuminating gas. The illuminating power of a gas was related to the amount of soot-forming hydrocarbons ("illuminants") dissolved in it. These hydrocarbons gave the gas flame its characteristic bright yellow color. Gas works would typically use oily bituminous coals as feedstock. These coals would give off large amounts of volatile hydrocarbons into the coal gas, but would leave behind a crumbly, low-quality coke not suitable for metallurgical processes.

Coal or coke oven gas typically had a calorific value between 10 and 20 megajoules per cubic metre (270 and 540 Btu/ft^{3}); with values around 20 MJ/m^{3} (540 Btu/ft^{3}) being typical.

The advent of electric lighting forced utilities to search for other markets for manufactured gas. MGPs that once almost exclusively produced lighting gas shifted their efforts towards supplying gas for heating and cooking, and even refrigeration and cooling.

== Gas for industrial use ==
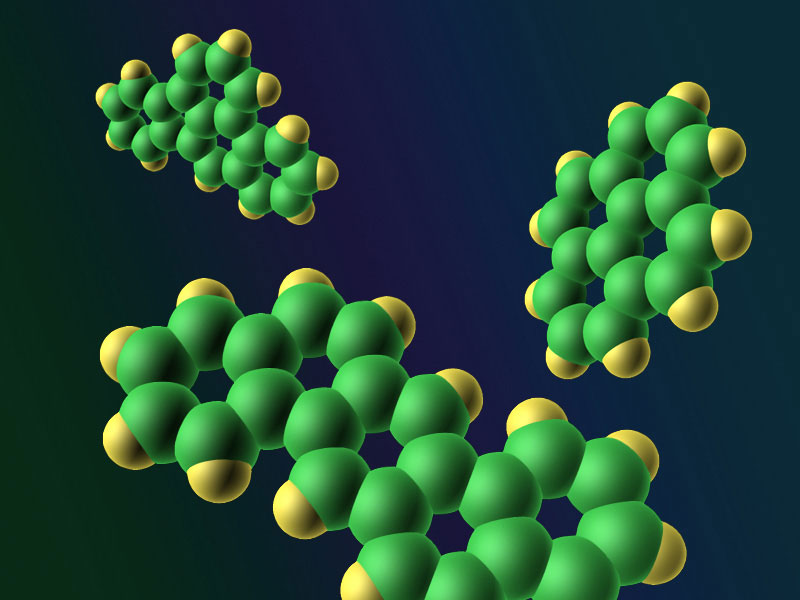
An illustration of typical polycyclic aromatic hydrocarbons. Source: NASA

Fuel gas for industrial use was made using producer gas technology. Producer gas is made by blowing air through an incandescent fuel bed (commonly coke or coal) in a gas producer. The reaction of fuel with insufficient air for total combustion produces carbon monoxide (CO); this reaction is exothermic and self-sustaining. It was discovered that adding steam to the input air of a gas producer would increase the calorific value of the fuel gas by enriching it with CO and hydrogen (H_{2}) produced by water gas reactions. Producer gas has a very low calorific value of 3.7 to 5.6 MJ/m^{3} (99 to 150 Btu/ft^{3}); because the calorific gases CO/H_{2} are diluted with much inert nitrogen (from air) and carbon dioxide (CO_{2}) (from combustion).

2C (s) + O_{2} → 2 CO (exothermic producer gas reaction)
C (s) + H_{2}O (g) → CO + H_{2} (endothermic water gas reaction)
C + 2 H_{2}O → CO_{2} + 2 H_{2} (endothermic)
CO + H_{2}O → CO_{2} + H_{2} (exothermic water gas shift reaction)

The problem of nitrogen dilution was overcome by the blue water gas (BWG) process, developed in the 1850s by Sir William Siemens. The incandescent fuel bed would be alternately blasted with air followed by steam. The air reactions during the blow cycle are exothermic, heating up the bed, while the steam reactions during the make cycle are endothermic and cool down the bed. The products from the air cycle contain non-calorific nitrogen and are exhausted out the stack while the products of the steam cycle are kept as blue water gas. This gas is composed almost entirely of CO and H_{2}, and burns with a pale blue flame similar to natural gas. BWG has a calorific value of 11 MJ/m^{3} (300 BTU/cu ft).

Blue water gas lacked illuminants; it would not burn with a luminous flame in a simple fishtail gas jet as existed before the invention of the gas mantle in the 1890s. Various attempts were made to enrich BWG with illuminants from gas oil in the 1860s. Gas oil (an early form of gasoline) was the flammable waste product from kerosene refining, made from the lightest and most volatile fractions (tops) of crude oil. In 1875 Thaddeus S. C. Lowe invented the carburetted water gas process. This process revolutionized the manufactured gas industry and was the standard technology until the end of the manufactured gas era. A CWG generating set consisted of three elements; a producer (generator), carburettor and a super heater connected in series with gas pipes and valves.

During a make run, steam would be passed through the generator to make blue water gas. From the generator the hot water gas would pass into the top of the carburettor where light petroleum oils would be injected into the gas stream. The light oils would be thermocracked as they came in contact with the white-hot checkerwork fire bricks inside the carburettor. The hot enriched gas would then flow into the superheater, where the gas would be further cracked by more fire bricks.

== Gas in post-war Britain ==
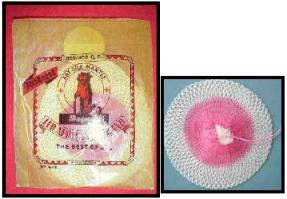
Mantles in their unused flat-packed form

=== New manufacturing processes ===
Following the Second World War the slow recovery of the British coal mining industry led to shortages of coal and high prices.

UK coal production
Year	Production, million tons	Production cost, £/ton
1947	197	2.00
1950	216	2.40
1953	223	3.05
1956	222	3.85
1959	206	4.15
1961	191	4.55
1965	187	4.60
1967	172	4.95

The decline of coal as a feedstock for town gas production using carbonisation is demonstrated in this graph.

Coal-based town gas production, millions of therms

New technologies for manufacturing coal gas using oil, refinery tail gases, and light distillates were developed. Processes included the Lurgi Process, catalytic reforming, the catalytic rich gas process, steam reforming of rich gas, and the gas recycle hydrogenator process. The catalytic rich gas process used natural gas as a feedstock to manufacture town gas. These facilities utilised the chemical reaction processes described above.

The rise of oil as a feedstock to manufacture town gas is shown on the graph below. The peak usage in 1968/9 and subsequent decline coincides with the availability of North Sea gas which, over the next few years, displaced town gas as a primary fuel and led to the decline of oil as a feedstock for gas making, as shown.

Oil-based town gas production, millions of therms

=== Domestic heating ===
By the 1960s, manufactured gas, compared with its main rival in the energy market, electricity, was considered "nasty, smelly, dirty and dangerous" (to quote market research of the time) and seemed doomed to lose market share still further, except for cooking where its controllability gave it marked advantages over both electricity and solid fuel. The development of more efficient gas fires assisted gas to resist competition in the market for room heating. Concurrently a new market for whole-house central heating by hot water was being developed by the oil industry and the gas industry followed suit. Gas warm air heating found a market niche in new local authority housing where low installation costs gave it an advantage. These developments, the realignment of managerial thinking away from commercial management (selling what the industry produced) to marketing management (meeting the needs and desires of customers) and the lifting of an early moratorium preventing nationalised industries from using television advertising, saved the gas industry for long enough to provide a viable market for what was to come.

=== Natural gas as feedstock ===
In 1959 the Gas Council in Great Britain demonstrated that liquid natural gas (LNG) could be transported safely, efficiently and economically over long distances by sea. The Methane Pioneer shipped a consignment of LNG from Lake Charles, Louisiana, US, to a new LNG terminal on Canvey Island, in the Thames estuary in Essex, England. A 212-mile (341 km) long high-pressure trunk pipeline was built from Canvey Island to Bradford. The pipeline and its branches provided Area Gas Boards with natural gas for use in reforming processes to make town gas. A large-scale LNG reception plant was commissioned on Canvey in 1964, which received LNG from Algeria in two dedicated tankers, each of 12,000 tonnes.

=== Conversion to natural gas ===
The slow decline of the town gas industry in the UK was driven by the discovery of natural gas by the drilling rig Sea Gem, on 17 September 1965, some forty miles off Grimsby, over 8,000 feet (2,400 m) below the seabed. Subsequently, the North Sea was found to have many substantial gas fields on both sides of the median line defining which nations should have rights over the reserves.

In a pilot scheme customers on Canvey Island were converted from town gas to natural gas supplied from the LNG plant on Canvey.

The Fuel Policy White Paper of 1967 (Cmd. 3438) pointed the industry in the direction of building up the use of natural gas speedily to 'enable the country to benefit as soon as possible from the advantages of this new indigenous energy source'. As a result, there was a 'rush to gas' for use in peak load electricity generation and in low-grade uses in industry.

The growth in availability of natural gas is shown in the graph below. Until 1968 this was from supplies of LNG from Algeria; from 1968, North Sea gas was available.

Natural gas available, millions of therms

The exploitation of the North Sea gas reserves, entailing landing gas at Easington (Yorkshire) Bacton (Norfolk) and St Fergus (Aberdeenshire) made viable the building of a national distribution grid, of over 3,000 miles (4,800 km), consisting of two parallel and interconnected pipelines running the length of the country. This became the National Transmission System. All gas equipment in Great Britain (but not Northern Ireland) was converted (by the fitting of different-sized burner jets to give the correct gas/air mixture) from town gas to natural gas (mainly methane) over the period from 1967 to 1977 at a cost of about £100 million, including writing off redundant town gas manufacturing plants. All the gas-using equipment of almost thirteen million domestic, four hundred thousand commercial, and sixty thousand industrial customers were converted. Many dangerous appliances were discovered in this exercise and were taken out of service.

The UK town gas industry ended in 1987 when operations ceased at the last town gas manufacturing plants in Northern Ireland (Belfast, Portadown and Carrickfergus; Carrickfergus gas works is now a restored gasworks museum). The Portadown site has been cleared and is now the subject of a long-term experiment into the use of bacteria for the purpose of cleaning up contaminated industrial land.

As well as requiring little processing before use, natural gas is non-toxic; the carbon monoxide (CO) in town gas made it extremely poisonous, accidental poisoning and suicide by gas being commonplace. Poisoning from natural gas appliances is only due to incomplete combustion, which creates CO, and flue leaks to living accommodation. As with town gas, a small amount of foul-smelling substance (mercaptan) is added to the gas to indicate to the user that there is a leak or an unlit burner, the gas having no odour of its own.

The organisation of the British gas industry adapted to these changes, first, by the Gas Act 1965 by empowering the Gas Council to acquire and supply gas to the twelve area gas boards. Then, the Gas Act 1972 formed the British Gas Corporation as a single commercial entity, embracing all the twelve area gas boards, allowing them to acquire, distribute and market gas and gas appliances to industrial commercial and domestic customers throughout the UK. In 1986, British Gas was privatised and the government no longer has any direct control over it.

During the era of North Sea gas, many of the original cast iron gas pipes installed in towns and cities for town gas were replaced by plastic.

As reported in the DTI Energy Review 'Our Energy Challenge' January 2006 North Sea gas resources have been depleted at a faster rate than had been anticipated and gas supplies for the UK are being sought from remote sources, a strategy made possible by developments in the technologies of pipelaying that enable the transmission of gas over land and under sea across and between continents. Natural gas is now a world commodity. Such sources of supply are exposed to all the risks of any import.

== Gas production in Germany ==
In many ways, Germany took the lead in coal gas research and carbon chemistry. With the labours of August Wilhelm von Hofmann, the whole German chemical industry emerged. Using the coal gas waste as feedstock, researchers developed new processes and synthesized natural organic compounds such as Vitamin C and aspirin.

The German economy relied on coal gas during the Second World War as petroleum shortages forced Nazi Germany to develop the Fischer–Tropsch synthesis to produce synthetic fuel for aircraft and tanks.

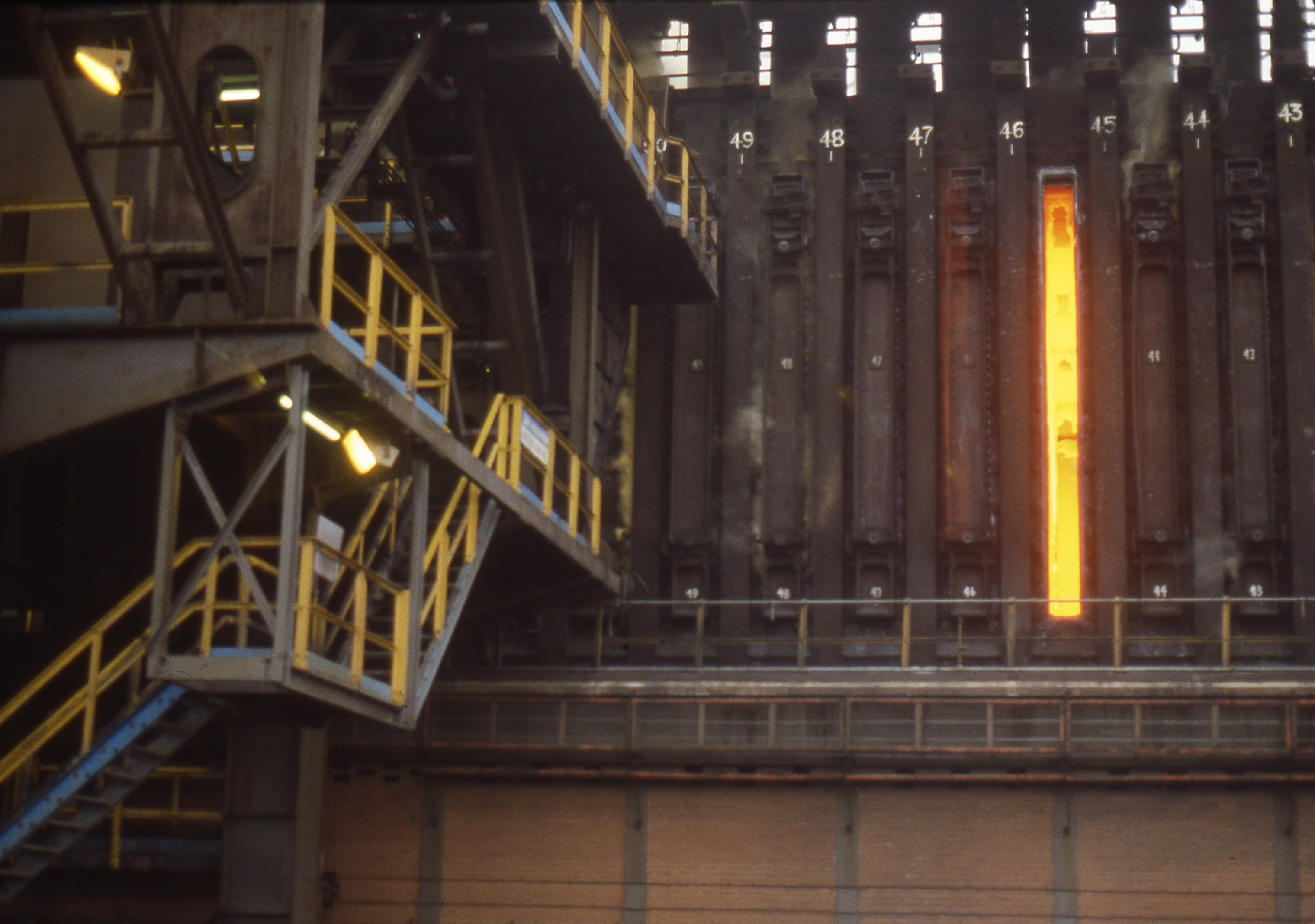
Coke oven at smokeless fuel plant, South Wales

== Issues in gas processing ==
- Tar aerosols (tar extractors, condensers/scrubbers, Electrostatic precipitators in 1912)
- Light oil vapors (oil washing)
- Naphthalene (oil/tar washing)
- Ammonia gas (scrubbers)
- Hydrogen sulfide gas (purifier boxes)
- Hydrogen cyanide gas (purifier)

Before 1912, "primary" (low-temperature tar)—de:Urteer, was extracted from the coal gas by washing with Ammoniacal liquor.

Benzole sub-plant: used at large gasworks sites and consisted of a series of vertical tanks containing petroleum oil through which the gas was bubbled to extract benzole (BTX) from the coal gas. The benzole dissolved into the petroleum oil and was run through a steam separating plant to be sold separately.

Exhausters (ensured consistent flow through the purification train): Pumps drew gas out of the retorts to prevent pressure buildup, which would otherwise cause the gas to leak or decompose.

- The Washer-Scrubber: Large towers using water or oil to remove Ammonia and Naphthalene (which would otherwise clog the street pipes).
- Purifier Boxes: Huge iron boxes filled with lime or iron oxide to remove Hydrogen Sulfide.
- "Blue Billy": A specific toxic waste product (cyanide-contaminated lime) from the purification process, now a major focus of modern environmental remediation at old gasworks sites.

	Process Phase	Targeted Issue / Impurity
Scrubbers (Washers)	Wet Purification	Ammonia & Light Oils: Towers using water or oil to dissolve ammonia gas and capture light oil vapors (BTX).
Purifiers ("Iron Sponges")	Dry Purification	Hydrogen Sulfide (H_{2}S): Trays of moist ferric oxide (iron oxide) react with sulfur; also targets Hydrogen Cyanide.
Naphthalene Washers	Specialized Scrubbing	"Naphthalene Specific": oil-washing to prevent "mothball" crystals from clogging distribution pipes.

== WWI-interwar era developments ==
- Loss of high-quality gas oil (used as motor fuel) and feed coke (diverted for steelmaking) leads to massive tar problems. CWG (carburetted water gas) tar is less valuable than coal gasification tar as a feedstock. Tar-water emulsions are uneconomical to process due to unsellable water and lower quality byproducts.

CWG tar is full of lighter polycyclic aromatic hydrocarbons, good for making pitch, but poor in chemical precursors.

- Various "back-run" procedures for CWG generation lower fuel consumption and help deal with issues from the use of bituminous coal in CWG sets.
- Development of high-pressure pipeline welding encourages the creation of large municipal gas plants and the consolidation of the MG industry. Sets the stage for the rise of natural gas.
- Electric lighting replaces gaslight. MG industry peak is sometime in the mid-1920s.
- 1936 or so. Development of Lurgi gasifier. Germans continue work on gasification/synfuels due to oil shortages.

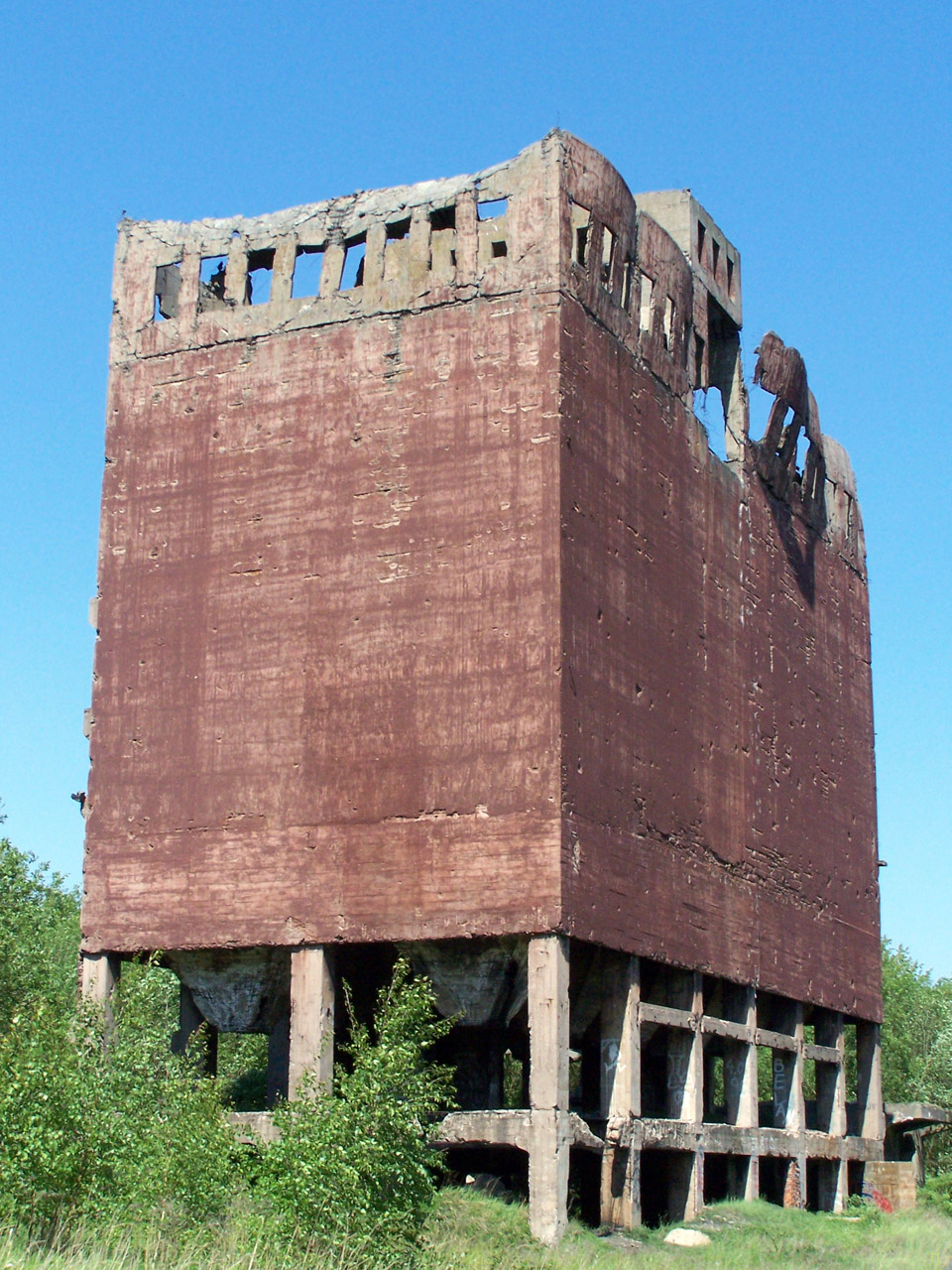
Ruins of the German synthetic petrol plant (Hydrierwerke Pölitz – Aktiengesellschaft) in Police, Poland

- The Public Utility Holding Company Act of 1935, in the US, forces the breakup of integrated coke and gas companies in the United States.
- Fischer–Tropsch process for synthesis of liquid fuels from CO/H_{2} gas.
- Haber-Bosch ammonia process creates a large demand for industrial hydrogen.

== Post WWII: the decline of manufactured gas ==
- Development of natural gas industry. Natural gas has an energy content of 37 MJ/m^{3}, compared to the 10-20 MJ/m^{3} of town gas.
- Petrochemicals kill much of the value of coal tar as a source of chemical feed stocks. (BTX, Phenols, Pitch)
- Decline in creosote use for wood preserving.
- Direct coal/natural gas injection reduces demand for metallurgical coke. 25 to 40% less coke is needed in blast furnaces.
- BOF and EAF processes obsolete cupola furnaces. Reduces need for coke in recycling steel scrap. Less need for fresh steel/iron.
- Cast iron & steel are replaced with aluminum and plastics.
- Phthalic anhydride production shifts from catalytic oxidation of naphthalene to the o-xylol process.

== Post WWII positive developments ==
- Catalytic upgrading of gas by use of hydrogen to react with tarry vapours in the gas
- The decline of coke making in the US leads to a coal tar crisis since coal tar pitch is vital for the production of carbon electrodes for EAF/aluminium. US now has to import coal tar from China
- Development of process to make methanol via hydrogenation of CO/H_{2} mixtures.
- Mobil M-gas process for making petrol from methanol
- SASOL coal process plant in South Africa.
- Direct hydrogenation of coal into liquid and gaseous fuels
- Dankuni Coal Complex is the only plant in India that is producing coal gas (town gas) in Kolkata using the Continuous Vertical Retort Technology of Babcock-Woodall Duckham (UK), constructed on the recommendation of GoI's Fuel Policy Committee of 1974 after the crippling 1973 Oil Crisis. The plant uses a modified low temperature carbonisation to produce the town gas and soft coke. The plant in the 1990s produced various chemicals like xylenol, cresol and phenol.

=== By-products ===
The by-products of coal gas manufacture included coke, coal tar, sulfur and ammonia and these were all useful products. Dyes, medicines such as sulfa drugs, saccharine, and dozens of organic compounds are made from coal tar.

The coal used, and the town gas and by-products produced, by the major three gas companies of London are summarised in the table.

Company	Gas, Light and Coke			South Metropolitan			Commercial		
Year	1913	1920	1934	1913	1920	1934	1913	1920	1934
Coal carbonised, tons	1,988,241	2,279,253	3,011,227	1,125,779	1,211,857	1,118,573	187,291	235,406	244,644
Gas made, million cubic feet	29,634	35,149	51,533	14,097	15,182	15,034	3,702	4,340	3,487
Coke made, tons	1,246,624	1,469,220	1,867,038	695,214	743,982	664,555	117,057	158,899	159,019
Coke made, hundredweight per ton of coal (20 hundredweight = 1 ton)	12.54	12.89	12.40	12.35	12.28	11.88	12.50	13.50	13.00
Coal tar made, million gallons	19.88	20.5	31.32	10.81	11.27	12.97	1.97	0.94	2.39
Coal tar made, gallons per ton of coal	10.0	9.0	10.4	9.6	9.3	10.7	10.5	9.4	9.8
Ammoniacal liquor made, million gallons	59.25	61.77	71.06	36.93	37.93	36.69	5.94	6.54	7.41
Ammoniacal liquor made, gallons per ton of coal	29.8	27.1	23.6	32.8	31.3	32.8	31.7	27.8	30.3

==== Coke ====
Coke is used as a smokeless fuel and for the manufacture of water gas and producer gas.

==== Coal tar ====
Coal tar was subjected to fractional distillation to recover various products, including:

- tar, for roads
- benzole, a motor fuel
- creosote, a wood preservative
- phenol, used in the manufacture of plastics
- cresols, disinfectants

==== Sulfur ====
Used in the manufacture of sulfuric acid.

==== Ammonia ====
Used in the manufacture of fertilisers.

=== Structure of the UK coal gas industry ===
Coal gas was initially manufactured by independent companies but in the United Kingdom many of these later became municipal services. In 1948 there was a total of 1,062 gas undertakings. Both the private companies, about two-thirds of the total, and the municipal gas undertakings, about one-third, were nationalised under the Gas Act 1948. Further restructuring took place under the Gas Act 1972. For further details see British Gas plc.

Apart from in the steel industry's coke ovens' by-products plants, coal gas is no longer made in the UK. It was replaced first by gas made from oil and later by natural gas from the North Sea.

== See also ==
- Coal gasification
- Coal seam gas
- Damp (mining)
- Environmental remediation
- Gas lighting
- Gas Works Park
- Gasifier
- Gasometer
- Gasworks
- History of manufactured gas
- Illuminating gas
- Mond gas
- Wood gas
