= List of acts of the 3rd session of the 49th Parliament of the United Kingdom =

This is a list of acts of the 3rd session of the 49th Parliament of the United Kingdom, which ran from 6 November 1985 until 7 November 1986.

Acts passed since 1963 are cited by calendar year, as opposed to the convention used for earlier acts of citing the regnal year(s) in which the relevant parliamentary session was held. Each act passed in a respective year is given a chapter number (abbreviated "c."), denoted by Arabic numerals in the case of public general acts, lowercase Roman numerals in the case of local acts, or italicised Arabic numerals in the case of personal acts. These run as separate series.

95 acts of Parliament were passed by the 49th Parliament in its 3rd session: 69 public general acts and 26 local acts.

indicates that an act is available to view at legislation.gov.uk, and indicates the location of the original act in the Parliamentary Archives.

== Public general acts ==
{{legislationuk|act |- | {{|Consolidated Fund (No. 3) Act 1985|public|74|19-12-1985|An Act to apply certain sums out of the Consolidated Fund to the service of the years ending on 31st March 1986 and 1987.}} |- | {{|European Communities (Spanish and Portuguese Accession) Act 1985|public|75|19-12-1985|maintained=y|An Act to extend the meaning in Acts, Measures and subordinate legislation of "the Treaties" and "the Community Treaties" in connection with the accession of the Kingdom of Spain and the Portuguese Republic to the European Communities.}} |- | {{|Northern Ireland (Loans) Act 1985|public|76|19-12-1985|maintained=y|An Act to increase the limit imposed by section 1 of the Northern Ireland (Loans) Act 1975.}} |- | {{|Education (Amendment) Act 1986|public|1|17-02-1986|maintained=y|An Act to increase the limit in section 2(1) of the Education (Grants and Awards) Act 1984 on expenditure approved for education support grant purposes, and to exclude remuneration for midday supervision from the Remuneration of Teachers Act 1965.}} |- | {{|Australia Act 1986|public|2|17-02-1986|maintained=y|An Act to give effect to a request by the Parliament and Government of the Commonwealth of Australia.}} |- | {{|Atomic Energy Authority Act 1986|public|3|19-02-1986|maintained=y|An Act to put the finances of the United Kingdom Atomic Energy Authority on a trading fund basis; and for connected purposes.}} |- | {{|Consolidated Fund Act 1986|public|4|18-03-1986|An Act to apply certain sums out of the Consolidated Fund to the service of the years ending on 31st March 1985 and 1986.}} |- | {{|Agricultural Holdings Act 1986|public|5|18-03-1986|maintained=y|An Act to consolidate certain enactments relating to agricultural holdings, with amendments to give effect to recommendations of the Law Commission.}} |- | {{|Prevention of Oil Pollution Act 1986|public|6|18-03-1986|maintained=y|An Act to prohibit the discharge from vessels of oil or mixtures containing oil into certain United Kingdom waters; and for connected purposes.}} |- | {{|Marriage (Wales) Act 1986|public|7|18-03-1986|maintained=y|An Act to extend section 23 of the Marriage Act 1949 to Wales.}} |- | {{|Museum of London Act 1986|public|8|26-03-1986|maintained=y|An Act to make provision with respect to the composition and functions of the Board of Governors of the Museum of London and the funding of the Museum.}} |- | {{|Law Reform (Parent and Child) (Scotland) Act 1986|public|9|26-03-1986|maintained=y|An Act to make fresh provision in the law of Scotland with respect to the consequences of birth out of wedlock, the rights and duties of parents, the determination of parentage and the taking of blood samples in relation to the determination of parentage; to amend the law as to guardianship; and for connected purposes.}} |- | {{|Local Government Act 1986|public|10|26-03-1986|maintained=y|An Act to require rating authorities to set a rate on or before 1st April; to prohibit political publicity and otherwise restrain local authority publicity; to require the mortgagor's consent and make other provision in connection with the disposal of local authority mortgages; to amend the law as to the effect of retirement and re-election of, and the allowances payable to, members of certain authorities; and for connected purposes.}} |- | {{|Gaming (Amendment) Act 1986|public|11|02-05-1986|maintained=y|An Act to amend section 16 of the Gaming Act 1968 to make provision for the redemption of cheques; and to amend section 22 of that Act as to the records to be kept with respect to cheques.}} |- | {{|Statute Law (Repeals) Act 1986|public|12|02-05-1986|maintained=y|An Act to promote the reform of the statute law by the repeal, in accordance with recommendations of the Law Commission and the Scottish Law Commission, of certain enactments which (except in so far as their effect is preserved) are no longer of practical utility, and to make other provision in connection with the repeal of those enactments.}} |- | {{|Highways (Amendment) Act 1986|public|13|02-05-1986|maintained=y|An Act to amend the Highways Act 1980 so as to impose penalties in cases where a user of a highway is injured, interrupted or endangered in consequence of the lighting of a fire on the highway or elsewhere.}} |- | {{|Animals (Scientific Procedures) Act 1986|public|14|20-05-1986|maintained=y|An Act to make new provision for the protection of animals used for experimental or other scientific purposes.}} |- | {{|Industrial Training Act 1986|public|15|20-05-1986|maintained=y|An Act to make provision with respect to the functions of industrial training boards.}} |- | {{|Marriage (Prohibited Degrees of Relationship) Act 1986|public|16|20-05-1986|maintained=y|An Act to make further provision with regard to the marriage of persons related by affinity.}} |- | {{|Drainage Rates (Disabled Persons) Act 1986|public|17|26-06-1986|An Act to make provision for reducing drainage rates in respect of premises used by disabled persons and invalids.}} |- | {{|Corneal Tissue Act 1986|public|18|26-06-1986|maintained=y|An Act to permit the removal of eyes or parts of eyes for therapeutic purposes and purposes of medical education and research by persons who are not medically qualified, subject to appropriate safeguards.}} |- | {{|British Shipbuilders (Borrowing Powers) Act 1986|public|19|26-06-1986|An Act to raise the limits imposed by section 11 of the Aircraft and Shipbuilding Industries Act 1977 in relation to the finances of British Shipbuilders and its wholly owned subsidiaries.}} |- | {{|Horticultural Produce Act 1986|public|20|26-06-1986|maintained=y|An Act to confer on authorised officers (within the meaning of Part III of the Agriculture and Horticulture Act 1964) powers in relation to the movement of horticultural produce; and for purposes connected therewith.}} |- | {{|Armed Forces Act 1986|public|21|26-06-1986|maintained=y|An Act to continue the Army Act 1955, the Air Force Act 1955 and the Naval Discipline Act 1957 and to amend those Acts and the Armed Forces Act 1976 and the Armed Forces Act 1981.}} |- | {{|Civil Protection in Peacetime Act 1986|public|22|26-06-1986|maintained=y|An Act to enable local authorities to use their civil defence resources in connection with emergencies and disasters unconnected with any form of hostile attack by a foreign power.}} |- | {{|Safety at Sea Act 1986|public|23|26-06-1986|maintained=y|An Act to promote the safety of fishing and other vessels at sea and the persons in them; and for related purposes.}} |- | {{|Health Service Joint Consultative Committees (Access to Information) Act 1986|public|24|26-06-1986|maintained=y|An Act to provide for access by the public to meetings of, and to certain documents and information relating to, joint consultative committees and sub-committees constituted under section 22 of the National Health Service Act 1977.}} |- | {{|Commonwealth Development Corporation Act 1986|public|25|26-06-1986|maintained=y|An Act to extend the powers of the Commonwealth Development Corporation; to enable the Secretary of State to make grants to the Corporation; and to enable him to impose restrictions on, and to give guarantees in respect of, borrowing by the Corporation's subsidiaries.}} |- | {{|Land Registration Act 1986|public|26|26-06-1986|maintained=y|An Act to make amendments of the Land Registration Act 1925 relating to the conversion of title and to leases, to abolish the Minor Interests Index, and for connected purposes.}} |- | {{|Road Traffic Regulation (Parking) Act 1986|public|27|08-07-1986|maintained=y|An Act to amend the Road Traffic Regulation Act 1984 in relation to parking.}} |- | {{|Children and Young Persons (Amendment) Act 1986|public|28|08-07-1986|maintained=y|An Act to amend the law in relation to children and young persons in care and to proceedings connected therewith.}} |- | {{|Consumer Safety (Amendment) Act 1986|public|29|08-07-1986|An Act to make further provision with respect to the safety of consumers and others.}} |- | {{|Forestry Act 1986|public|30|08-07-1986|maintained=y|An Act to empower the Forestry Commissioners to require the restocking of land with trees after unauthorised felling.}} |- | {{|Airports Act 1986|public|31|08-07-1986|maintained=y|An Act to provide for the dissolution of the British Airports Authority and the vesting of its property, rights and liabilities in a company nominated by the Secretary of State; to provide for the reorganisation of other airport undertakings in the public sector; to provide for the regulation of the use of airports and for the imposition of economic controls at certain airports; to make other amendments of the law relating to airports; to make provision with respect to the control of capital expenditure by local authority airport undertakings; and for connected purposes.}} |- | {{|Drug Trafficking Offences Act 1986|public|32|08-07-1986|maintained=y|An Act to make provision for the recovery of the proceeds of drug trafficking and other provision in connection with drug trafficking, to make provision about the supply of articles which may be used or adapted for use in the administration of controlled drugs or used to prepare a controlled drug for administration and to increase the number of assistant commissioners of police for the metropolis.}} |- | {{|Disabled Persons (Services, Consultation and Representation) Act 1986|public|33|08-07-1986|maintained=y|An Act to provide for the improvement of the effectiveness of, and the co-ordination of resources in, the provision of services for people with mental or physical handicap and for people with mental illness; to make further provision for the assessment of the needs of such people; to establish further consultative processes and representational rights for such people; and for connected purposes.}} |- | {{|Protection of Children (Tobacco) Act 1986|public|34|08-07-1986|maintained=y|An Act to amend the Children and Young Persons Act 1933, and the Children and Young Persons (Scotland) Act 1937, to make it an offence to sell any tobacco product to persons under the age of sixteen; and for connected purposes.}} |- | {{|Protection of Military Remains Act 1986|public|35|08-07-1986|maintained=y|An Act to secure the protection from unauthorised interference of the remains of military aircraft and vessels that have crashed, sunk or been stranded and of associated human remains; and for connected purposes.}} |- | {{|Incest and Related Offences (Scotland) Act 1986|public|36|18-07-1986|maintained=y|An Act to make provision for Scotland in respect of incest and related offences.}} |- | {{|Latent Damage Act 1986|public|37|18-07-1986|maintained=y|An Act to amend the law about limitation of actions in relation to actions for damages for negligence not involving personal injuries; and to provide for a person taking an interest in property to have, in certain circumstances, a cause of action in respect of negligent damage to the property occurring before he takes that interest.}} |- | {{|Outer Space Act 1986|public|38|18-07-1986|maintained=y|An Act to confer licensing and other powers on the Secretary of State to secure compliance with the international obligations of the United Kingdom with respect to the launching and operation of space objects and the carrying on of other activities in outer space by persons connected with this country.}} |- | {{|Patents, Designs and Marks Act 1986|public|39|18-07-1986|maintained=y|An Act to amend the enactments relating to the registers of trade marks, designs and patents so as to enable them to be kept otherwise than in documentary form and so as to give the enactments due effect in relation to any portion of a register not kept in documentary form; to make amendments of the Trade Marks Act 1938 in relation to the use of the Royal Arms and other devices, emblems and titles and in relation to the protection of trade marks and service marks for whose protection application has been made overseas; to make other amendments of the Trade Marks Act 1938 in its application to service marks and amendments of other Acts in relation to such marks; and for connected purposes.}} |- | {{|Education Act 1986|public|40|18-07-1986|maintained=y|An Act to provide for the making of grants by the Secretary of State to the Fellowship of Engineering and the Further Education Unit and to make further provision in relation to the arrangements under Part VI of the Local Government, Planning and Land Act 1980 for the pooling of expenditure by local authorities on education and for connected purposes.}} |- | {{|Finance Act 1986|public|41|25-07-1986|maintained=y|An Act to grant certain duties, to alter other duties, and to amend the law relating to the National Debt and the Public Revenue, and to make further provision in connection with Finance.}} |- | {{|Appropriation Act 1986|public|42|25-07-1986|An Act to apply a sum out of the Consolidated Fund to the service of the year ending on 31st March 1987, to appropriate the supplies granted in this Session of Parliament, and to repeal certain Consolidated Fund and Appropriation Acts.}} |- | {{|Crown Agents (Amendment) Act 1986|public|43|25-07-1986|maintained=y|An Act to amend section 17 of the Crown Agents Act 1979.}} |- | {{|Gas Act 1986|public|44|25-07-1986|maintained=y|An Act to provide for the appointment and functions of a Director General of Gas Supply and the establishment and functions of a Gas Consumers' Council; to abolish the privilege conferred on the British Gas Corporation by section 29 of the Gas Act 1972; to make new provision with respect to the supply of gas through pipes and certain related matters; to provide for the vesting of the property, rights and liabilities of the British Gas Corporation in a company nominated by the Secretary of State and the subsequent dissolution of that Corporation; to make provision with respect to, and to information furnished in connection with, agreements relating to the initial supply of gas won under the authority of a petroleum production licence; and for connected purposes.}} |- | {{|Insolvency Act 1986|public|45|25-07-1986|maintained=y|An Act to consolidate the enactments relating to company insolvency and winding up (including the winding up of companies that are not insolvent, and of unregistered companies); enactments relating to the insolvency and bankruptcy of individuals; and other enactments bearing on those two subject matters, including the functions and qualification of insolvency practitioners, the public administration of insolvency, the penalisation and redress of malpractice and wrongdoing, and the avoidance of certain transactions at an undervalue.}} |- | {{|Company Directors Disqualification Act 1986|public|46|25-07-1986|maintained=y|An Act to consolidate certain enactments relating to the disqualification of persons from being directors of companies, and from being otherwise concerned with a company's affairs.}} |- | {{|Legal Aid (Scotland) Act 1986|public|47|25-07-1986|maintained=y|An Act to establish the Scottish Legal Aid Board and the Scottish Legal Aid Fund; to make new provision in connection with the availability of criminal legal aid in Scotland; to repeal and re-enact with modifications certain enactments relating to legal aid and to advice and assistance in Scotland; and for connected purposes.}} |- | {{|Wages Act 1986|public|48|25-07-1986|maintained=y|An Act to make fresh provision with respect to the protection of workers in relation to the payment of wages; to make further provision with respect to wages councils; to restrict redundancy rebates to employers with less than ten employees and to abolish certain similar payments; and for connected purposes.}} |- | {{|Agriculture Act 1986|public|49|25-07-1986|maintained=y|An Act to make further provision relating to agriculture and agricultural and other food products, horticulture and the countryside; and for connected matters.}} |- | {{|Social Security Act 1986|public|50|25-07-1986|maintained=y|An Act to make provision in relation to personal pension schemes, to amend the law relating to social security, occupational pension schemes and the provision of refreshments for school pupils, to abolish maternity pay under the Employment Protection (Consolidation) Act 1978 and provide for the winding-up of the Maternity Pay Fund, to empower the Secretary of State to pay the travelling expenses of certain persons, and for connected purposes.}} |- | {{|British Council and Commonwealth Institute Superannuation Act 1986|public|51|25-07-1986|maintained=y|An Act to enable schemes to be made under section 1 of the Superannuation Act 1972 in respect of persons who are serving or have previously served in employment with the British Council or the Commonwealth Institute.}} |- | {{|Dockyard Services Act 1986|public|52|25-07-1986|maintained=y|An Act to make provision in connection with any arrangements that may be made by the Secretary of State for or with a view to the provision by contractors of certain dockyard services.}} |- | {{|Building Societies Act 1986|public|53|25-07-1986|maintained=y|An Act to make fresh provision with respect to building societies and further provision with respect to conveyancing services.}} |- | {{|Rate Support Grants Act 1986|public|54|21-10-1986|maintained=y|An Act to validate certain block grant determinations already approved by the House of Commons; and to clarify and amend the law relating to rate support grants.}} |- | {{|Family Law Act 1986|public|55|07-11-1986|maintained=y|An Act to amend the law relating to the jurisdiction of courts in the United Kingdom to make orders with regard to the custody of children; to make provision as to the recognition and enforcement of such orders throughout the United Kingdom; to make further provision as to the imposition, effect and enforcement of restrictions on the removal of children from the United Kingdom or from any part of the United Kingdom; to amend the law relating to the jurisdiction of courts in Scotland as to tutory and curatory; to amend the law relating to the recognition of divorces, annulments and legal separations; to make further provision with respect to the effect of divorces and annulments on wills; to amend the law relating to the powers of courts to make declarations relating to the status of a person; to abolish the right to petition for jactitation of marriage; to repeal the Greek Marriages Act 1884; to make further provision with respect to family proceedings rules; to amend the Child Abduction Act 1984, the Child Abduction (Northern Ireland) Order 1985 and the Child Abduction and Custody Act 1985; and for connected purposes.}} |- | {{|Parliamentary Constituencies Act 1986|public|56|07-11-1986|maintained=y|An Act to consolidate the House of Commons (Redistribution of Seats) Acts 1949 to 1979 and certain related enactments.}} |- | {{|Public Trustee and Administration of Funds Act 1986|public|57|07-11-1986|maintained=y|An Act to make provision with respect to certain functions of the Public Trustee, the Accountant General of the Supreme Court (Note: Although the term "Supreme Court" was amended to "Senior Courts" in each place it occurs in the Act by the Constitutional Reform Act 2005 on 1 October 2009, the long title was exempted from amendment.) and the Court of Protection as respects the management, protection or administration of the funds and other property and, if under disability, the affairs of private persons; and with respect to the investment expenses of the National Debt Commissioners.}} |- | {{|European Communities (Amendment) Act 1986|public|58|07-11-1986|maintained=y|An Act to amend the European Communities Act 1972 so as to include in the definition of "the Treaties" and "the Community Treaties" certain provisions of the Single European Act signed at Luxembourg and The Hague on 17th and 28th February 1986 and extend certain provisions relating to the European Court to any court attached thereto; and to amend references to the Assembly of the European Communities and approve the Single European Act.}} |- | {{|Sex Discrimination Act 1986|public|59|07-11-1986|maintained=y|An Act to amend the Sex Discrimination Act 1975 and sections 64 and 73 of the Employment Protection (Consolidation) Act 1978; to make provision with respect to requirements to discriminate in relation to employment which are contained in public entertainment licences; to provide for the removal of certain restrictions applying to the working hours and other working conditions of women; and to repeal the Baking Industry (Hours of Work) Act 1954.}} |- | {{|Financial Services Act 1986|public|60|07-11-1986|maintained=y|An Act to regulate the carrying on of investment business; to make related provision with respect to insurance business and business carried on by friendly societies; to make new provision with respect to the official listing of securities, offers of unlisted securities, takeover offers and insider dealing; to make provision as to the disclosure of information obtained under enactments relating to fair trading, banking, companies and insurance; to make provision for securing reciprocity with other countries in respect of facilities for the provision of financial services; and for connected purposes.}} |- | {{|Education (No. 2) Act 1986|public|61|07-11-1986|maintained=y|An Act to amend the law relating to education.}} |- | {{|Salmon Act 1986|public|62|07-11-1986|maintained=y|An Act to make fresh provision for the administration of salmon fisheries in Scotland; to provide as to the licensing and regulation of salmon dealing in Scotland and in England and Wales; to provide for, and as respects, certain offences in the law of Scotland and in the law of England and Wales in connection with salmon; to amend the Salmon and Freshwater Fisheries Act 1975, section 5 of the Sea Fisheries Regulation Act 1966 and section 9 of the Diseases of Fish Act 1983; to provide for the review of salmon fishing by means of nets; and for connected purposes.}} |- | {{|Housing and Planning Act 1986|public|63|07-11-1986|maintained=y|An Act to make further provision with respect to housing, planning and local inquiries; to provide financial assistance for the regeneration of urban areas; and for connected purposes.}} |- | {{|Public Order Act 1986|public|64|07-11-1986|maintained=y|An Act to abolish the common law offences of riot, rout, unlawful assembly and affray and certain statutory offences relating to public order; to create new offences relating to public order; to control public processions and assemblies; to control the stirring up of racial hatred; to provide for the exclusion of certain offenders from sporting events; to create a new offence relating to the contamination of or interference with goods; to confer power to direct certain trespassers to leave land; to amend section 7 of the Conspiracy and Protection of Property Act 1875, section 1 of the Prevention of Crime Act 1953, Part V of the Criminal Justice (Scotland) Act 1980 and the Sporting Events (Control of Alcohol etc.) Act 1985; to repeal certain obsolete or unnecessary enactments; and for connected purposes.}} |- | {{|Housing (Scotland) Act 1986|public|65|07-11-1986|maintained=y|An Act to amend the Tenants' Rights, Etc. (Scotland) Act 1980, the Housing Associations Act 1985 in its application to Scotland and the Building (Scotland) Act 1959; to make further provision as regards housing in Scotland; and for connected purposes.}} |- | {{|National Health Service (Amendment) Act 1986|public|66|07-11-1986|maintained=y|An Act to apply certain enactments, orders and regulations relating to food and health and safety to certain health service bodies and premises; to make further provision as to pharmaceutical services under the National Health Service Act 1977 and the National Health Service (Scotland) Act 1978 and the remuneration of persons providing those services, general medical services, general dental services or general ophthalmic services under those Acts; to provide further, as respects Scotland, as to co-operation among certain bodies in securing and advancing the health of disabled persons, the elderly and others; and for connected purposes.}} }}

== Local acts ==
{{legislationuk|act |- | {{|Fraserburgh Harbour Order Confirmation Act 1985|local|45|19-12-1985|An Act to confirm a Provisional Order under the Private Legislation Procedure (Scotland) Act 1936, relating to Fraserburgh Harbour.|po1=Fraserburgh Harbour Order 1985|Provisional Order to enact new provisions with respect to the constitution of the Fraserburgh Harbour Commissioners; to repeal and to re-enact with amendments the Fraserburgh Harbour Acts 1878 to 1975; to extend the limits of Fraserburgh Harbour; to make other provision with reference to Fraserburgh Harbour; and for purposes connected therewith.}} |- | {{|Fraserburgh Harbour (No. 2) Order Confirmation Act 1985|local|46|19-12-1985|An Act to confirm a Provisional Order under the Private Legislation Procedure (Scotland) Act 1936, relating to Fraserburgh Harbour (No. 2).|po1=Fraserburgh Harbour (No. 2) Order 1985|Provisional Order to authorise the Fraserburgh Harbour Commissioners to carry out works for the improvement of Fraserburgh Harbour and to borrow money; and for other purposes.}} |- | {{|Fraserburgh Harbour (No. 3) Order Confirmation Act 1985|local|47|19-12-1985|An Act to confirm a Provisional Order under the Private Legislation Procedure (Scotland) Act 1936, relating to Fraserburgh Harbour (No. 3).|po1=Fraserburgh Harbour (No. 3) Order 1985|Provisional Order to authorise the Fraserburgh Harbour Commissioners to carry out works for the improvement of Fraserburgh Harbour; and for other purposes.}} |- | {{|Okehampton Bypass (Confirmation of Orders) Act 1985|local|48|19-12-1985|An Act to confirm, for the purposes of the Statutory Orders (Special Procedure) Act 1945, two compulsory purchase orders made by the Secretary of State under the Highways Act 1980 and the Acquisition of Land Act 1981 for purposes connected with the construction of the Okehampton Bypass.|po1=Exeter–Launceston–Bodmin Trunk Road (Okehampton Bypass) Compulsory Purchase Order (No. CSW 1) 1984|po1note1= (Note: Although passed in 1985, the short title specifies the year 1984.)|po1long=n|po2=Exeter–Launceston–Bodmin Trunk Road (Okehampton Bypass Supplementary No. 1) Compulsory Purchase Order (No. CSW 2) 1984|po2note1=|po2long=n}} |- | {{|Poole Borough Council Act 1986|local|1|17-02-1986|maintained=y|An Act to re-enact with amendments certain local enactments in force within the borough of Poole; to confer further powers on the Poole Borough Council; and for other purposes.}} |- | {{|Berkshire Act 1986|local|2|17-02-1986|maintained=y|An Act to re-enact with amendments and to extend certain local enactments in force within the county of Berkshire; to confer further powers on the Berkshire County Council and local authorities in the county; to make further provision with regard to the environment, local government, improvement, health and finances of the county; and for other purposes.}} |- | {{|British Railways Act 1986|local|3|17-02-1986|maintained=y|An Act to empower the British Railways Board to construct works and to purchase or use land; to extend the time for the compulsory purchase of certain land; to confer further powers on the Board; and for other purposes.}} |- | {{|Greater London Council (General Powers) Act 1986|local|4|18-03-1986|maintained=y|An Act to confer further powers upon the Greater London Council and other authorities; and for other purposes.}} |- | {{|Peterhead Harbours (South Bay Development) Order Confirmation Act 1986|local|5|26-03-1986|An Act to confirm a Provisional Order under the Private Legislation Procedure (Scotland) Act 1936, relating to Peterhead Harbours (South Bay Development).|po1=Peterhead Harbours (South Bay Development) Order 1985|po1note1= (Note: Although passed in 1986, the short title specifies the year 1985.)|Provisional Order to authorise the Trustees of the harbours of Peterhead to construct works adjacent to their existing undertaking in the area commonly known as South Bay, Peterhead; to provide for a partial cesser of the Peterhead Bay Harbour Trust and Transfer Order 1983; and for other purposes.}} |- | {{|Lothian Region (Edinburgh Western Relief Road) Order Confirmation Act 1986|local|6|16-04-1986|An Act to confirm a Provisional Order under the Private Legislation Procedure (Scotland) Act 1936, relating to Lothian Region (Edinburgh Western Relief Road).|po1=Lothian Region (Edinburgh Western Relief Road) Order 1985|po1note1=|Provisional Order to authorise The Lothian Regional Council to acquire lands; to construct and maintain a new road into the City of Edinburgh from the west; to divert a portion of the Edinburgh/Glasgow and Edinburgh/Dundee railway lines; to construct a railway junction; to construct a spur road linking the proposed new road with the A8 road and to construct other relative works; to confer powers on the British Railways Board in relation to the diverted portion of the Edinburgh/Glasgow and Edinburgh/Dundee railway lines and the said railway junction; and for other purposes.}} |- | {{|Swansea City Council (Tawe Barrage) Act 1986|local|7|16-04-1986|An Act to authorise the Swansea City Council to construct a barrage and lock across the river Tawe in the city of Swansea and other works, and to acquire lands; to provide for the control and development of part of the river for recreational navigation; to confer further powers on the Council; and for other purposes.}} |- | {{|Yorkshire Water Authority Act 1986|local|8|02-05-1986|An Act to provide for the alleviation of flooding in parts of the city of York; to empower the Yorkshire Water Authority to construct works, including a barrier with a movable gate across the river Foss, and to acquire lands; to confer further powers on the Authority; and for other purposes.}} |- | {{|Ullapool Harbour Order Confirmation Act 1986|local|9|20-05-1986|An Act to confirm a Provisional Order under the Private Legislation Procedure (Scotland) Act 1936, relating to Ullapool Harbour.|po1=Ullapool Harbour Order 1986|Provisional Order to provide for the licensing of works and dredging in and otherwise for the regulation of Ullapool Harbour; to confer powers on the Ullapool Harbour Trustees; and for other purposes.}} |- | {{|Gull Island Protection Act 1986|local|10|20-05-1986|An Act to extinguish the public right of navigation through Bull's Lake (The Swatchway).}} |- | {{|Isle of Wight Act 1986|local|11|20-05-1986|An Act to amend the Isle of Wight County Council Act 1971; and for other purposes.}} |- | {{|Harrogate Borough Council Act 1986|local|12|08-07-1986|An Act to re-enact with amendments certain local enactments in force within the borough of Harrogate; to confer further powers on the Council of the Borough of Harrogate with respect to the management of Bogs Field, local government and public order in the borough; and for other purposes.}} |- | {{|South Yorkshire Passenger Transport Act 1986|local|13|08-07-1986|An Act to authorise the South Yorkshire Passenger Transport Executive to operate trolley vehicles; and for other purposes.}} |- | {{|Clifton Suspension Bridge Act 1986|local|14|08-07-1986|An Act to authorise the Trustees of the Clifton Suspension Bridge Trust to provide or assist in the provision of a museum in the vicinity of the said bridge; and for other purposes.}} |- | {{|Ipswich Port Authority Act 1986|local|15|25-07-1986|An Act to extend the time for the completion of the works authorised by the Ipswich Dock Act 1971; to increase and amend the borrowing powers of the Ipswich Port Authority; to confer further powers on the Authority; to accord priority of passage to certain vessels passing to and from the port of Ipswich over certain other vessels not so passing; and for connected and other purposes.}} |- | {{|Alcoholics Anonymous (Dispositions) Act 1986|local|16|25-07-1986|An Act to empower The General Service Board of Alcoholics Anonymous (Great Britain) Limited to disclaim all or part of property donated to it in certain circumstances; and for purposes incidental thereto.}} |- | {{|Bournemouth–Swanage Motor Road and Ferry Act 1986|local|17|25-07-1986|maintained=y|An Act to provide for the motor road of the Bournemouth–Swanage Motor Road and Ferry Company to continue as part of the Company's undertaking; to authorise the Company to execute works; to confer other powers on the Company in relation to their undertaking including powers to raise additional capital; to amend or repeal certain of the local statutory provisions applicable to them; and for other purposes.}} |- | {{|Bromborough Dock Act 1986|local|18|25-07-1986|An Act to provide for the abandonment of Bromborough Dock; to empower UML Limited to construct certain works for the purposes of such abandonment and to confer further powers upon the Company; and for other purposes.}} |- | {{|Western Isles Islands Council (Berneray Harbour) Order Confirmation Act 1986|local|19|21-10-1986|An Act to confirm a Provisional Order under the Private Legislation Procedure (Scotland) Act 1936, relating to Western Isles Islands Council (Berneray Harbour).|po1=Western Isles Islands Council (Berneray Harbour) Order 1986|Provisional Order to authorise the Western Isles Islands Council or the Highlands and Islands Development Board to carry out harbour works at Berneray; to define harbour limits in the vicinity of the works and of the existing ferry terminal and to authorise the exercise of harbour jurisdiction therein by the Council; and for connected purposes.}} |- | {{|Milford Haven Port Authority Act 1986|local|20|07-11-1986|An Act to alter the name of the Milford Haven Conservancy Board and to extend the power to make payments to members.}} |- | {{|Blyth Harbour Act 1986|local|21|07-11-1986|maintained=y|An Act to reconstitute the Blyth Harbour Commissioners; to make further and other provision as to their powers and duties; to redefine the harbour limits at Blyth; and for connected or other purposes.}} |- | {{|Great Yarmouth Outer Harbour Act 1986|local|22|07-11-1986|An Act to empower the Great Yarmouth Port and Haven Commissioners to construct works and to acquire lands at Great Yarmouth; to confer further powers upon the Commissioners; and for other purposes.}} }}
