= Gas and Electricity Act 1968 =

Act of the Parliament of the United Kingdom

Gas and Electricity Act 1968 (Note: Section 8.)
- Act of Parliament
- Parliament of the United Kingdom
- Long title: An Act to increase the statutory limits on the amounts outstanding in respect to borrowings by the Gas Council and Area Gas Boards; to provide for the borrowing by the Electricity Council, the Scottish Electricity Boards and the Gas Council of money in foreign currency; to enable the said Councils and Boards and other electricity authorities to furnish overseas aid; to increase the number of members of the Gas Council; and for connected purposes.
- Citation: 1968 c. 39
- Introduced by: R. J. Gunter, Minister of Power, 22 May 1968 (Second Reading) (Commons)
- Territorial extent: United Kingdom

Dates
- Royal assent: 3 July 1968
- Commencement: 3 July 1968 (Note: The Acts of Parliament (Commencement) Act 1793.)
- Repealed: Scotland: 22 April 1979; England and Wales and Northern Ireland: 31 March 1990 (Note: The Electricity Act 1989 (Commencement No. 2) Order 1990 (SI 1990/117).)
Other legislation
Amends	Gas Act 1948; Electricity Act 1957; Electricity and Gas Act 1963; Gas Act 1965; Gas (Borrowing Powers) Act 1965
Amended by	Gas Act 1972; Overseas Development and Co-operation Act 1980
Repealed by	Scotland: Electricity (Scotland) Act 1979; England and Wales and Northern Ireland: Electricity Act 1989

Status: Repealed

Text of statute as originally enacted

The Gas and Electricity Act 1968 (c. 39) was an act of the Parliament of the United Kingdom which extended the powers of the Gas Council, the area gas boards and the Electricity Council to borrow money, including foreign currency, to meet their obligations; it permitted statutory gas and electricity bodies to render technical aid overseas; and allowed further member appointments to the Electricity Council. The Act was principally in response to a rapid growth of the gas industry following the discovery of North Sea gas on the UK Continental Shelf in 1965.

== Background ==
The government recognised that there had been significant technological development in the gas industry since the first natural gas was discovered in the UK sector of the North Sea in 1965. This included major capital investments in onshore terminals and cross-country pipelines. It was envisaged that sales of gas would double by 1970/71 and double again by 1973. Both the gas and electricity industries had expressed an interest in borrowing capital in foreign currency markets. The expanded functions of the Gas Council had made it desirable for the council membership to be increased. The Gas and Electricity Act 1968 addressed these issues and provided the necessary legal powers.

== Gas and Electricity Act 1968 ==
The Gas and Electricity Act 1968 received royal assent on 3 July 1968. Its long title is: ‘An Act to increase the statutory limits on the amounts outstanding in respect to borrowings by the Gas Council and Area Gas Boards; to provide for the borrowing by the Electricity Council, the Scottish Electricity Boards and the Gas Council of money in foreign currency; to enable the said Councils and Boards and other electricity authorities to furnish overseas aid; to increase the number of members of the Gas Council; and for connected purposes.’

=== Provisions ===
The provisions of the act comprise eight sections

- Section 1 extended the borrowing powers of Gas Council and area gas boards to £1,600 million or a greater sum not exceeding £2,400, as sanctioned by the minister. The Gas (Borrowing Powers) Act 1965 ceased to have effect.
- Section 2 Empowered the Electricity Council to borrow foreign currency by the issue of securities
- Section 3 Empowered the Scottish Electricity Boards to borrow foreign currency by the issue of securities
- Section 4 Empowered the Gas Council to borrow foreign currency by the issue of securities
- Section 5 Permitted the furnishing of foreign aid by the Electricity Council, the Central Electricity Board, an area electricity board, the Gas Council, or an area gas board.
- Section 6 Empowered the minister to appoint two further members to the Gas Council
- Section 7 Interpretation
- Section 8 Short title

== Consequences and later enactments ==
As a consequence of Section 1(3)(a) of the 1968 act the Gas (Borrowing Powers) Act 1965 ceased to have effect.

In 1969 the Electricity Council and the South of Scotland Electricity Board floated loans on the German market.

Sections 1, 4 and 6 of the 1968 act were repealed by the Gas Act 1972.

The whole act was repealed for Scotland by section 46(2) of, and schedule 10 to, the Electricity (Scotland) Act 1979, which came into force on 22 April 1979.

The whole act was repealed for England and Wales and Northern Ireland by the Electricity Act 1989 (schedule 18).

== See also ==
- Oil and gas industry in the United Kingdom
- Gas board
- Gas Council
- British Gas
- Electricity Council
