= Gas Levy Act 1981 =

Act of the Parliament of the United Kingdom

Gas Levy Act 1981 (Note: Section 7(1).)
- Act of Parliament
- Parliament of the United Kingdom
- Long title: An Act to impose on the British Gas Corporation a levy in respect of certain gas.
- Citation: 1981 c. 3
- Introduced by: David Howell, Secretary of State for Energy, 16 February 1981 (second reading) (Commons); The Earl of Gowrie, Minister of State, Department of Employment, 9 March 1981, (second reading) (Lords)
- Territorial extent: United Kingdom

Dates
- Royal assent: 19 March 1981
- Commencement: 19 March 1981 (Note: Section 4(b) of the Interpretation Act 1978.)
- Repealed: 31 July 1998

Other legislation
- Amended by: Gas Act 1986; Gas (Metrication) Regulations 1992
- Repealed by: Finance Act 1998
- Relates to: Gas Act 1972

Status: Repealed

Text of statute as originally enacted

Revised text of statute as amended

The Gas Levy Act 1981 (c. 3) was an act of the Parliament of the United Kingdom which imposed on the British Gas Corporation a levy in respect of purchased natural gas.

== Background ==
In May 1980 the government announced that it intended to impose a levy on the British Gas Corporation on gas purchased from the United Kingdom continental shelf (UKCS) and sold to the corporation under contracts which were not subject to petroleum revenue tax.

Virtually all the gas that came onshore from the UKCS was sold to the British Gas Corporation by the producers under long-term contracts signed before the oil crisis of 1973–74 and 1979–80 and the subsequent increase in prices. As a consequence, the prices paid for gas from these fields reflected the prices and the escalation clauses agreed in an era of cheap energy. The average basic cost to British Gas of all its gas purchases in 1980–81 was about 8p a therm. The price paid by producers for new supplies or renegotiated contracts were more than twice that amount, together with provisions for increases in line with oil price increases. The government wished to ensure that gas prices reflected the costs of supply both then and in future.

== Provisions ==
The act received royal assent on 19 March 1981. Its long title is 'An Act to impose on the British Gas Corporation a levy in respect of certain gas.'

The act comprises seven sections:

- Section 1 Gas levy. From 1980 to 1981 a gas levy shall be payable by the British Gas Corporation on gas purchased by the corporation under a tax-exempt contract or from a tax-exempt reservoir.
- Section 2 Rate of levy. The rate shall be one penny per therm (1980–81); three pence per therm (1981–82); and
- five pence per therm (1982–83). The rate of levy for the future shall be specified by order made by the Secretary of State for Energy with the consent of the Treasury.
- Section 3 Payment of levy. The levy shall be paid to the Secretary of State.
- Section 4 Levy where gas is stored in natural reservoirs. Where a natural reservoir is used for the storage of gas produced elsewhere a gas levy shall only be payable on the amount by which the number of therms supplied from that reservoir exceeds the number of therms put into the reservoir.
- Section 5 Supplementary provisions. It shall be the duty of the corporation to ensure that any rights to verify the accuracy of measuring and testing equipment maintained by a person supplying them with gas are adequately exercised; to install, maintain and use measuring and testing equipment.
- Section 6 Financial provisions. The Secretary of State shall pay the gas levy into the Consolidated Fund. The Secretary of State for Energy shall prepare forms as the Treasury may direct an account of sums received by him.
- Section 7 Citation and interpretation. This Act may be cited as the Gas Levy Act 1981. Therm means 0.105506 gigajoules.

== Working of the act ==
The government received £394.5 million from the British Gas Corporation for payments under the Gas Levy Act 1981 for the financial year 1981–82.

== Subsequent developments ==
Section 5A on offences was subsequently included as a further supplementary provision by the Gas Act 1986. The rate of the Gas Levy was amended and continued by statutory instruments.

The whole act was repealed by section 165(1) of, and part V of schedule 27 to, the Finance Act 1998, which came into force on 31 July 1998. Section 153 of the act abolished the Gas Levy.

== See also ==
- Oil and gas industry in the United Kingdom
