= Iron and Steel Act 1967 =

Act of the Parliament of the United Kingdom

Iron and Steel Act 1967 (Note: Section 51(1).)
- Act of Parliament
- Parliament of the United Kingdom
- Long title: An Act to provide for the establishment of a National Steel Corporation and the transfer thereto of the securities of certain companies engaged in the production of steel and, in connection therewith, to revive certain provisions of the Iron and Steel Act 1949 and continue others in force and to amend certain of the revived provisions; to make fresh provision for the control of the provision of iron and steel production facilities; to dissolve the Iron and Steel Board and amend the provisions of the Iron and Steel Act 1953 concerning the Iron and Steel Holding and Realisation Agency; and for purposes connected with the matters aforesaid.
- Citation: 1967 c. 17
- Territorial extent: England and Wales; Scotland; Northern Ireland (section 1(8)); (Note: Section 51(2).)

Dates
- Royal assent: 22 March 1967
- Commencement: 22 March 1967 (Note: The Acts of Parliament (Commencement) Act 1793.)
- Repealed: 12 December 1975
Other legislation
Amends	Iron and Steel Act 1949; Iron and Steel Act 1953
Amended by	National Loans Act 1968; Statutory Corporations (Financial Provisions) Act 1975; Employment Protection (Consolidation) Act 1978
Repealed by	Finance Act 1967; Iron and Steel Act 1969; Income and Corporation Taxes Act 1970; Tribunals and Inquiries Act 1971; Gas Act 1972; European Communities Act 1972; National Debt Act 1972; Finance Act 1973; House of Commons Disqualification Act 1975; Iron and Steel Act 1975
Relates to	Iron and Steel Act 1949

Status: Repealed

Text of statute as originally enacted

The Iron and Steel Act 1967 (c. 17) was an act of the Parliament of the United Kingdom, which regulated corporate governance in the iron and steel industries. It renationalised the steel industry and formed the British Steel Corporation. It required that employees had voting rights for the board of directors.

== Contents ==
Part V of schedule 4 stated that the corporation was required to participate in discussions with the workforce. Under this provision, worker directors were introduced in 1969.

The renationalisation effort brought in 14 big private companies, that represented around 90% of UK production, together to form the British Steel Corporation. At the time the corporation had a workforce of roughly 268,500.

== Background ==
The Iron and Steel Act 1949 (12, 13 & 14 Geo. 6. c. 72) had been enacted by the post-war Labour government to nationalized elements of the British iron and steel industry. It established the Iron and Steel Corporation to acquire certain companies.

Nationalisation of iron and steel production had been strongly opposed by the Conservative opposition. On returning to power in October 1951 they planned to denationalise and return the industry to the private sector. This policy was enacted through the Iron and Steel Act 1953 (1 & 2 Eliz. 2. c. 15) which repealed the 1949 act and dissolved the Iron and Steel Corporation.

The 1953 act remained in force until the Labour government re-nationalised the iron and steel industry in 1967 through the Iron and Steel Act 1967.

== Subsequent developments ==
The whole act, so far as unrepealed, was repealed by section 38(3) of, and schedule 7 to, the Iron and Steel Act 1975, which came into force on 12 December 1975.

== See also ==
- UK labour law
- UK company law

== Bibliography ==
- Labour Party, Industrial Democracy (1967) §92
- E Ganguin, ‘B.S.C.’s worker directors take stock of their first year’ (25 June 1969) Financial Times
- Bacot, ‘Blue Collars in the Boardroom’ (May 1972) Bus Ad 88
- P Brannen, ‘Worker directors: an approach to analysis. The case of the British Steel Corporation’ in C Crouch and FA Heller, Organizational Democracy and Political Processes (Wiley 1983) vol I, ch 6
