= Iron and Steel Act 1982 =

Act of the Parliament of the United Kingdom

Iron and Steel Act 1982 (Note: Section 39(1).)
- Act of Parliament
- Parliament of the United Kingdom
- Long title: An Act to consolidate certain enactments relating to the British Steel Corporation and the iron and steel industry.
- Citation: 1982 c. 25
- Territorial extent: England and Wales; Scotland; (Note: Section 39(3).)

Dates
- Royal assent: 13 July 1982
- Commencement: 13 October 1982 (Note: Section 39(2).)
Other legislation
Amends	See § Repealed enactments
Repeals/revokes	Iron and Steel Act 1975; Iron and Steel (Amendment) Act 1976; Iron and Steel Act 1981
Amended by	British Steel Act 1988

Status: Partially repealed

Text of statute as originally enacted

Revised text of statute as amended

Text of the Iron and Steel Act 1982 as in force today (including any amendments) within the United Kingdom, from legislation.gov.uk.

The Iron and Steel Act 1982 (c. 25) is an act of the Parliament of the United Kingdom that consolidated certain enactments relating to the British Steel Corporation and the iron and steel industry in Great Britain.

== Repealed enactments ==
Section 38(2) of the act repealed 5 enactments, listed in schedule 7 to the act.

Enactments repealed by section 38(2)
Citation	Short title	Extent of repeal
1975 c. 64	Iron and Steel Act 1975	The whole act.
1976 c. 41	Iron and Steel (Amendment) Act 1976	The whole act.
1980 c. 22	Companies Act 1980	In Schedule 3, paragraph 47.
1981 c. 46	Iron and Steel Act 1981	The whole act.
1981 c. 67	Acquisition of Land Act 1981	In Schedule 4, paragraph 24.

== Subsequent developments ==
In section 1(1), the words from "which shall" onwards, sections 2 to 32, parts of sections 33 and 34, sections 35 to 38, paragraphs 7 and 8 of schedule 1, and schedules 2 to 7 were repealed by section 16(3) of, and part I of schedule 2 to, the British Steel Act 1988, which came into force on 5 September 1988. (Note: The British Steel Act 1988 (Appointed Day) Order 1988 (SI 1988/1375).) Section 1 and schedule 1 were subsequently repealed by section 16(3) of, and part II of schedule 2 to, the same act, which came into force on the dissolution of the British Steel Corporation.
