= Rights of Entry (Gas and Electricity Boards) Act 1954 =

Act of the Parliament of the United Kingdom

Rights of Entry (Gas and Electricity Boards) Act 1954 (Note: Section 4(1).)
- Act of Parliament
- Parliament of the United Kingdom
- Long title: An Act to regulate the exercise of statutory rights of entry by or on behalf of Gas Boards and Electricity Boards, and for purposes connected with the matters aforesaid.
- Citation: 2 & 3 Eliz. 2. c. 21
- Introduced by: Viscount Hailsham on 24 February 1954 (Second Reading) (Lords)
- Territorial extent: England and Wales; Scotland; (Note: Section 4(2).)

Dates
- Royal assent: 18 March 1954
- Commencement: 18 April 1954 (Note: Section 4(3).)

Other legislation
- Amended by: Gas Act 1965; Gas Act 1972; Gas Act 1986; Electricity Act 1989; Gas Act 1995; Utilities Act 2000

Status: Amended

Text of statute as originally enacted

Revised text of statute as amended

Text of the Rights of Entry (Gas and Electricity Boards) Act 1954 as in force today (including any amendments) within the United Kingdom, from legislation.gov.uk.

The Rights of Entry (Gas and Electricity Boards) Act 1954 (2 & 3 Eliz. 2. c. 21) is an act of the Parliament of the United Kingdom which regulated the right of entry into premises by utility boards.

== Background ==
Various Gas Acts and Electricity Acts had given gas and electricity inspectors the right of entry into premises. These powers exceeded those of police constables. In a civil law case in 1952 an individual brought an action against an electricity board for damages, complaining that the entry rights had been exercised against himself. Although the action failed, the constitutional position to which the case gave rise led to some disquiet during a debate in the House of Lords. To seek clarification the North Thames Gas Board made recommendations to the minister which resulted in this act.

The aim of the act was to ensure that where it is necessary for an official to enter premises, a justice of the peace should be satisfied that entry was reasonably required. However, in cases of emergency they are permitted to act without such a warrant.

== Rights of Entry (Gas and Electricity Boards) Act 1954 ==
The Rights of Entry (Gas and Electricity Boards) Act 1954 received royal assent on 18 March 1954. Its long title is ‘An Act to regulate the exercise of statutory rights of entry by or on behalf of gas boards and electricity boards, and for purposes connected with the matters aforesaid’.

=== Provisions ===
The act comprised four sections:

- Section 1 Restrictions on exercise of rights of entry. Consent of occupier or under the authorisation of a warrant, applies rights to gas and electricity boards, liabilities to penalties.
- Section 2 Warrant to authorise entry. Conditions required to satisfy a Justice of the Peace, limitations on issue of a warrant, repair and make good damage, make premises secure.
- Section 3 Interpretation. Definitions of gas board, right of entry, etc., endanger life and property, justice includes sheriff in Scotland.
- Section 4 Short title, extent and commencement. Does not extend to Northern Ireland, into force one month after enactment.

== Effects of the act ==
The powers defined by this act were retained in an amended form through the privatisation of the gas and electricity industries in 1986 and 1990 respectively.

In 2014 the then Department of Energy and Climate Change published a review of powers of entry which included the provisions of the Rights of Entry (Gas and Electricity Boards) Act 1954.

== Amendments ==
The act was amended by the Gas Act 1965, the Gas Act 1972, the Gas Act 1986, and the Electricity Act 1989.

== See also ==
- Timeline of the UK electricity supply industry
