= Iron and Steel Act 1975 =

Act of the Parliament of the United Kingdom

Iron and Steel Act 1975 (Note: Section 39(1).)
- Act of Parliament
- Parliament of the United Kingdom
- Long title: An Act to consolidate certain enactments relating to the British Steel Corporation and the iron and steel industry.
- Citation: 1975 c. 64
- Territorial extent: England and Wales; Scotland; (Note: Section 39(2).)

Dates
- Royal assent: 12 November 1975
- Commencement: 12 December 1975 (Note: Section 39(3).)
- Repealed: 13 October 1982
Other legislation
Amends	See § Repealed enactments
Repeals/revokes	See § Repealed enactments
Amended by	Acquisition of Land Act 1981
Repealed by	Iron and Steel Act 1982

Status: Repealed

Text of statute as originally enacted

The Iron and Steel Act 1975 (c. 64) was an act of the Parliament of the United Kingdom that consolidated certain enactments relating to the British Steel Corporation and the iron and steel industry in Great Britain.

== Repealed enactments ==
Section 38(3) of the act repealed 11 enactments, listed in schedule 7 to the act.

Enactments repealed by section 38(3)
Citation	Short title	Extent of repeal
12, 13 & 14 Geo. 6. c. 72	Iron and Steel Act 1949	The whole act so far as unrepealed.
1 & 2 Eliz. 2. c. 15	Iron and Steel Act 1953	The whole act so far as unrepealed.
1967 c. 17	Iron and Steel Act 1967	The whole act so far as unrepealed.
1968 c. 13	National Loans Act 1968	In Schedules 1 and 5, the entries relating to the Iron and Steel Act 1967.
1969 c. 45	Iron and Steel Act 1969	The whole act so far as unrepealed.
1972 c. 12	Iron and Steel Act 1972	The whole act.
1972 c. 60	Gas Act 1972	In Schedule 6, paragraph 4.
1973 c. 41	Fair Trading Act 1973	In Schedule 12, the entry relating to the Iron and Steel Act 1967.
1973 c. 51	Finance Act 1973	In Schedule 19, paragraph 15.
1974 c. 8	Statutory Corporations (Financial Provisions) Act 1974	In Schedule 2, paragraph 8.
1975 c. 55	Statutory Corporations (Financial Provisions) Act 1975	Section 3. In Schedule 2, the words "The British Steel Corporation and the publicly-owned companies for the purposes of the Iron and Steel Act 1967". In Schedule 4, the entry relating to the Iron and Steel Act 1967.

== Subsequent developments ==
The whole act was repealed by section 38(2) of, and schedule 7 to, the Iron and Steel Act 1982, which came into force on 13 October 1982.
