= Digital Markets, Competition and Consumers Act 2024 =

Act of the Parliament of the United Kingdom

Digital Markets, Competition and Consumers Act 2024 (Note: Section 340.)
- Act of Parliament
- Parliament of the United Kingdom
- Long title: An Act to provide for the regulation of competition in digital markets; to amend the Competition Act 1998 and the Enterprise Act 2002 and to make other provision about competition law; to make provision relating to the protection of consumer rights and to confer further such rights; and for connected purposes.
- Citation: 2024 c. 13
- Introduced by: Kemi Badenoch, Secretary of State for Business and Trade (Commons); The Lord Offord of Garvel, Parliamentary Under-Secretary of State for Exports (Lords)
- Territorial extent: England and Wales; Scotland; Northern Ireland; (Note: Section 338.)

Dates
- Royal assent: 24 May 2024
- Commencement: Various (Note: Section 339.)
Other legislation
Amends	Trade Descriptions Act 1968; Administration of Justice Act 1970; Hallmarking Act 1973; Prescription and Limitation (Scotland) Act 1973; Estate Agents Act 1979; Competition Act 1980; Limitation Act 1980; Telecommunications Act 1984; Foreign Limitation Periods Act 1984; Companies Act 1985; Airports Act 1986; Gas Act 1986; Company Directors Disqualification Act 1986; Copyright, Designs and Patents Act 1988; Water Act 1989; Electricity Act 1989; Limitation (Northern Ireland) Order 1989; Water Industry Act 1991; Electricity (Northern Ireland) Order 1992; Railways Act 1993; Coal Industry Act 1994; Trade Marks Act 1994; Gas (Northern Ireland) Order 1996; Competition Act 1998; Greater London Authority Act 1999; Financial Services and Markets Act 2000; Utilities Act 2000; Transport Act 2000; Criminal Justice and Police Act 2001; Enterprise Act 2002; Company Directors Disqualification (Northern Ireland) Order 2002; Licensing Act 2003; Communications Act 2003; Energy (Northern Ireland) Order 2003; Enterprise Act 2002 (Merger Prenotification) Regulations 2003; Enterprise Act 2002 (Anticipated Mergers) Order 2003; Companies (Audit, Investigations and Community Enterprise) Act 2004; Water Mergers (Modification of Enactments) Regulations 2004; Serious Organised Crime and Police Act 2005; Water Services etc. (Scotland) Act 2005 (Consequential Provisions and Modifications) Order 2005; Wireless Telegraphy Act 2006; Companies Act 2006; Water and Sewerage Services (Northern Ireland) Order 2006; Legal Services Act 2007; Regulatory Enforcement and Sanctions Act 2008; Equality Act 2010; Postal Services Act 2011; Postal Services (Appeals to the Competition Commission) (Investigations and Extension of Time Limits) Order 2011; Health and Social Care Act 2012; Civil Aviation Act 2012; Postal Services Act 2011 (Disclosure of Information) Order 2012; Enterprise and Regulatory Reform Act 2013; Financial Services (Banking Reform) Act 2013; Consumer Contracts (Information, Cancellation and Additional Charges) Regulations 2013; Public Interest Disclosure (Prescribed Persons) Order 2014; Consumer Rights Act 2015; Breaching of Limits on Ticket Sales Regulations 2018; Online Safety Act 2023; Energy Act 2023
Repeals/revokes	Consumer Protection from Unfair Trading Regulations 2008; Alternative Dispute Resolution for Consumer Disputes (Competent Authorities and Information) Regulations 2015

Status: Current legislation

History of passage through Parliament

Text of statute as originally enacted

Revised text of statute as amended

The Digital Markets, Competition and Consumers Act 2024 (DMCC Act, DMCCA; c. 13) is an act of the Parliament of the United Kingdom. It amends the Competition Act 1998 and the Enterprise Act 2002.

A government press release described it as an act to "stamp out unfair practices and promote competition in digital markets". The act also introduced significant reforms to the enforcement of consumer protection laws. The act further bans subscription traps, fake reviews and drip pricing. Amendments at Third Reading in the House of Lords banned foreign states from having control or influence in the UK media.

The act gives statutory definitions to different things including subscription contracts.

In respect of digital markets regulation, it is the British counterpart to the European Union's Digital Markets Act and empowers the Competition and Markets Authority (which has established a Digital Markets Unit) to regulate firms designated as having "strategic market status".

The bill for the act passed its Third Reading in the House of Lords on 26 March 2024, and received royal assent on 24 May 2024. Other than administrative provisions, it will not come into effect until the Secretary of State signs a commencement order.

== Subscription contracts ==
The act provides consumers with rights regarding the information provided before they sign up to a subscription and provides for regular reminders to be issued, particularly before trials or 12 month+ contracts auto-renew. Traders will also have to ensure it is straightforward for people to exit contracts, allow them to exit online if they signed up online, and provide a 14 day cooling-off period after a trial or 12 month+ contract auto-renews. During these periods, a consumer can cancel without penalty.

== Utilisation ==
In July 2025, the CMA indicated it may deploy the Act's new digital markets powers following its final decision that competition is not working well in the UK cloud infrastructure services market.

== See also ==
- Electronic Commerce Regulations 2002
- Online Safety Act 2023
- Easy-to-cancel mandate
