= Foreign Limitation Periods Act 1984 =

Act of the Parliament of the United Kingdom

Foreign Limitation Periods Act 1984 (Note: Section 7(1).)
- Act of Parliament
- Parliament of the United Kingdom
- Long title: An Act to provide for any law relating to the limitation of actions to be treated, for the purposes of cases in which effect is given to foreign law or to determinations by foreign courts, as a matter of substance rather than as a matter of procedure.
- Citation: 1984 c. 16
- Territorial extent: England and Wales (Note: Section 7(4).)

Dates
- Royal assent: 24 May 1984
- Commencement: 1 October 1985 (Note: Section 7(2). The Foreign Limitation Periods Act 1984 (Commencement) Order 1985 (SI 1985/1276).)

Other legislation
- Amends: Limitation (Enemies and War Prisoners) Act 1945
- Amended by: Arbitration Act 1996; Law Applicable to Non-Contractual Obligations (England and Wales and Northern Ireland) Regulations 2008; Law Applicable to Contractual Obligations (England and Wales and Northern Ireland) Regulations 2009; Cross-Border Mediation (EU Directive) Regulations 2011; Alternative Dispute Resolution for Consumer Disputes (Amendment) Regulations 2015; Law Applicable to Contractual Obligations and Non-Contractual Obligations (Amendment etc.) (EU Exit) Regulations 2019; Overseas Operations (Service Personnel and Veterans) Act 2021; Northern Ireland Troubles (Legacy and Reconciliation) Act 2023; Retained EU Law (Revocation and Reform) Act 2023 (Consequential Amendment) Regulations 2023; Digital Markets, Competition and Consumers Act 2024

Status: Amended

Text of statute as originally enacted

Revised text of statute as amended

Text of the Foreign Limitation Periods Act 1984 as in force today (including any amendments) within the United Kingdom, from legislation.gov.uk.

The Foreign Limitation Periods Act 1984 (c. 16) is an act of the Parliament of the United Kingdom applicable only to England and Wales.

The act broadly provides that where any substantive matter falls to be determined by a foreign law under the English conflict of laws, then the limitation period applicable under that foreign law shall apply to it rather than the applicable period of limitation under the Limitation Act 1980.

The key provision is section 1(1) which provides:

(1) Subject to the following provisions of this Act, where in any action or proceedings in a court in England and Wales the law of any other country falls (in accordance with rules of private international law applicable by any such court) to be taken into account in the determination of any matter—

(a) the law of that other country relating to limitation shall apply in respect of that matter for the purposes of the action or proceedings, subject to section 1ZA and section 1B; and
(b) except where that matter falls within subsection (2) below, the law of England and Wales relating to limitation shall not so apply.

Section 2 of the act creates a specific exclusion dealing with the position where the length of a foreign limitation period would be contrary to public policy.

== Background ==
Prior to the passing of the act, the position with respect to foreign limitation periods was confusing and inconsistent, and depended upon whether the foreign limitation rule was characterised by the English courts as procedural or substantive. The position was summarised in Private international law in English courts:

Prior to the act, the approach to time bars and their impact on litigation was complicated. A provision which operated by extinguishing the right or the claim, or by ‘prescribing’ it, was regarded as substantive, with the result that such a provision, if part of the lex causae, was applicable in proceedings before an English court. By contrast, a provision which prevented the bringing of proceedings by limiting the time within which an action might be brought, but which did not annul the underlying right, was regarded as a procedural rule. The result was that any such provision of the lex fori would be applied by an English court while any like provision of the lex causae would not be. English time-bar provisions are enacted in the form of limitations, not prescriptions. The result was that English limitation periods and foreign periods of prescription applied cumulatively, with the shorter of the two being decisive. Except as the result of logic, the practical wisdom of this was impossible to see.
