= Gas (Exempt Supplies) Act 1993 =

Act of the Parliament of the United Kingdom

Gas (Exempt Supplies) Act 1993 (Note: Section 4(1).)
- Act of Parliament
- Parliament of the United Kingdom
- Long title: An Act to amend section 5 of the Gas Act 1986; and for connected purposes
- Citation: 1993 c. 1
- Introduced by: Lord Cochrane of Cults on 8 July 1992 (Second Reading) (Lords)
- Territorial extent: England and Wales; Scotland; (Note: Section 4(3).)

Dates
- Royal assent: 19 January 1993
- Commencement: 31 October 1994 (Note: Section 4(2). The Gas (Exempt Supplies) Act 1993 (Commencement) Order 1994 (SI 1994/2568))

Other legislation
- Amends: Gas Act 1986
- Amended by: Gas Act 1995

Status: Amended

Text of statute as originally enacted

Revised text of statute as amended

Text of the Gas (Exempt Supplies) Act 1993 as in force today (including any amendments) within the United Kingdom, from legislation.gov.uk.

The Gas (Exempt Supplies) Act 1993 (c. 1) is an act of the Parliament of the United Kingdom which amended the prohibition on certain unauthorised gas supplies and amended the duties of the Director General of Gas Supply.

== Background ==
The Gas Act 1986, which had privatised the British gas industry, had been focussed on large suppliers of gas. The associated bureaucracy and regulation costs were an impediment to smaller suppliers. These included suppliers of LPG (liquified petroleum gas, comprising butane and propane). The Gas (Exempt Supplies) Bill had started as a Private Members Bill in the House of Lords and was intended to remove the prohibition on unauthorised supply of gas from smaller operators.

== Gas (Exempt Supplies) Act 1993 ==
The Gas (Exempt Supplies) Act 1993 received royal assent on 19 January 1993. Its long title is ‘An Act to amend section 5 of the Gas Act 1986; and for connected purposes.’

=== Provisions ===
The act comprises four sections:

- Section 1: Prohibition on unauthorised supply. Removed and replaced Section 5 of the Gas Act 1986. Prohibition not to include suppliers of gas comprising mainly propane and butane.
- Section 2: Exemption from section 5. Added a new section 6A to the 1986 Act. Allowed exemptions if agreed by the Secretary of State for Energy and the Director General of Gas Supply.
- Section 3: Keeping a register. Exemptions and notifications to be included in a register.
- Section 4: Short title, commencement and extent. Act does not extend to Northern Ireland.

== Repeal ==
Sections 1 and 2 of this Act were repealed by Section 17 of the Gas Act 1995. Effective from 1 March 1996.

== See also ==
- Oil and gas industry in the United Kingdom
