= Utilities Act 2000 =

Act of the Parliament of the United Kingdom

Utilities Act 2000 (Note: Section 110(1).)
- Act of Parliament
- Parliament of the United Kingdom
- Long title: An Act to provide for the establishment and functions of the Gas and Electricity Markets Authority and the Gas and Electricity Consumer Council; to amend the legislation regulating the gas and electricity industries; and for connected purposes.
- Citation: 2000 c. 27
- Territorial extent: England and Wales; Scotland (except amendments and repeals); (Note: Section 110(4)–(5).)

Dates
- Royal assent: 28 July 2000
- Commencement: Various (Note: Section 110(2)–(3).)
Other legislation
Amends	Rights of Entry (Gas and Electricity Boards) Act 1954; House of Commons Disqualification Act 1975; Offshore Safety Act 1992; Gas Act 1995
Repeals/revokes	Fossil Fuel Levy Act 1998
Amended by	Railways Act 2005; Infrastructure Act 2015; Scotland Act 2016; Wales Act 2017; Energy Act 2023; Digital Markets, Competition and Consumers Act 2024; Planning and Infrastructure Act 2025

Status: Amended

Text of statute as originally enacted

Revised text of statute as amended

The Utilities Act 2000 (c. 27) is an act of the Parliament of the United Kingdom that deals with the gas and electrical markets in the UK.

== Provisions ==
It mainly modified the Gas Act 1986, the Gas Act 1995 and Electricity Act 1989. One of the greatest changes was that integrated electricity companies were required to have separate licences for each of their businesses such as supply or distribution. The bill was originally published as a draft bill to deal with provisions to deal with water and telecommunications as well, but following industry concerns over duplicate regulation they were dropped.

The act established Ofgem. Ofgem is required to find a "supplier of last resort" to ensure the continuity of energy supply if a supplier closes.

Section 105 of the act is intended to protect national security; it prohibits the disclosure of certain types of information relevant to the energy sector, with penalties of fines and up to two years' imprisonment for breaches. The section has been used by Ofgem to threaten whistleblowers informing their managers and the National Audit Office of misspends of millions of pounds. The Employment Appeal Tribunal found that the law contravened the European Convention on Human Rights.

== Reception ==
The act was supported by the National Energy Consumers Council.

== See also ==
- UK company law
- UK public service law
