= Gas Act 1986 =

Act of the Parliament of the United Kingdom

Gas Act 1986 (Note: Section 68(1).)
- Act of Parliament
- Parliament of the United Kingdom
- Long title: An Act to provide for the appointment and functions of a Director General of Gas Supply and the establishment and functions of a Gas Consumers' Council; to abolish the privilege conferred on the British Gas Corporation by section 29 of the Gas Act 1972; to make new provision concerning the supply of gas through pipes and certain related matters; to provide for the vesting of the property, rights and liabilities of the British Gas Corporation in a company nominated by the Secretary of State and the subsequent dissolution of that Corporation; to make provisions with respect to, and to information furnished in connection with, agreements relating to the initial supply of gas won under the authority of a petroleum production license; and for connected purposes.
- Citation: 1986 c. 44
- Territorial extent: England and Wales; Scotland; Northern Ireland (in part); (Note: Section 68(6).)

Dates
- Royal assent: 25 July 1986
- Commencement: 18 August 1986 (in part) (Note: Section 68(5). The Gas Act 1986 (Commencement No. 1) Order 1986 (SI 1986/1315).); 23 August 1986 (section 62) (Note: Section 68(5). The Gas Act 1986 (Commencement No. 1) Order 1986 (SI 1986/1315) and the Gas Act 1986 (Appointed Day) Order 1986 (SI 1986/1316).); 24 August 1986 (transfer date) (Note: Section 49. The Gas Act 1986 (Transfer Date) Order 1986 (SI 1986/1318).); 14 November 1986 (Note: Section 68(5). The Gas Act 1986 (Commencement No. 2) Order 1986 (SI 1986/1809).)

Other legislation
- Amends: London Passenger Transport Act 1933; Rights of Entry (Gas and Electricity Boards) Act 1954; Gas Act 1960; Gas Act 1965; Forestry Act 1967; Gas Act 1972; Restrictive Trade Practices Act 1976; Energy Act 1976; Gas Levy Act 1981; Oil and Gas (Enterprise) Act 1982; Oil and Pipelines Act 1985
- Repeals/revokes: London Gas Undertakings (Regulations) Act 1939
- Amended by: Planning (Consequential Provisions) Act 1990; Water Consolidation (Consequential Provisions) Act 1991; Offshore Safety Act 1992; Gas (Exempt Supplies) Act 1993; Gas Act 1995; Petroleum Act 1998; Postal Services Act 2000; Statute Law (Repeals) Act 2004; Scotland Act 2016; Digital Economy Act 2017; Energy Act 2023; Digital Markets, Competition and Consumers Act 2024

Status: Partially repealed

Text of statute as originally enacted

Revised text of statute as amended

Text of the Gas Act 1986 as in force today (including any amendments) within the United Kingdom, from legislation.gov.uk.

The Gas Act 1986 (c. 44) is an act of the Parliament of the United Kingdom that created the framework for privatisation of the gas supply industry in Great Britain. The legislation replaced the British Gas Corporation (government or state ownership) with British Gas plc (private ownership). The Act also established a licensing regime, a Gas Consumers’ Council, and a regulator for the industry called the Office of Gas Supply (OFGAS).

== Background ==
The liberalisation and privatisation of the energy markets in the United Kingdom began under the tenure of Margaret Thatcher’s Conservative Government in the 1980s. This has been called the Thatcher-Lawson agenda, due to the key role of Nigel Lawson, the Chancellor of the Exchequer (1983–89) in the Thatcher ministry. There was a perceived need to reduce the inefficient state control of the energy sector and to introduce a market-oriented system through privatisation. Access to the energy market would be given to more organisations, improving competition and reducing prices for the consumer.

== Provisions ==
The act received royal assent on 25 July 1986. The long title of the act is:

An Act to provide for the appointment and functions of a Director General of Gas Supply and the establishment and functions of a Gas Consumers' Council; to abolish the privilege conferred on the British Gas Corporation by section 29 of the Gas Act 1972; to make new provision with respect to the supply of gas through pipes and certain related matters; to provide for the vesting of the property, rights and liabilities of the British Gas Corporation in a company nominated by the Secretary of State and the subsequent dissolution of that Corporation; to make provision with respect to, and to information furnished in connection with, agreements relating to the initial supply of gas won under the authority of a petroleum production licence; and for connected purposes.

=== Provisions ===
The provisions of the act comprise 68 sections in three parts, plus eight schedules.

- Part I: Gas supply
  - Sections 1 to 4: Introductory – the Director-General of Gas Supply, the Gas Consumers’ Council
  - Sections 5 to 8: Authorization of gas supply – authorization of public gas suppliers, authorization of other persons
  - Sections 9 to 15: Supply of gas by public gas suppliers – general powers and duties, fixing of tariffs, public gas supply code
  - Sections 16 to 18: Supply of gas by public gas suppliers and others – quality standards, safety regulations
  - Sections 19 to 22: Use by other persons of pipe-lines belonging to public gas suppliers – acquisition of rights to use pipe-lines, construction of pipe-lines, increasing capacity of pipe-lines
  - Sections 23 to 27: Modification of public gas suppliers’ authorizations
  - Sections 28 to 30: Securing compliance of public gas suppliers
  - Sections 31 to 33: Investigation of complaints – the duties of the Director-General of Gas Supply and the Gas Consumers’ Council to investigate certain matters
  - Sections 34 to 39: Other functions of the Director-General of Gas Supply – general functions, the publication of information and advice, annual and other reports
  - Sections 40 to 41: Other functions of the Gas Consumers’ Council – the duty to advise the Director-General of Gas Supply, annual reports
  - Sections 42 to 44: Miscellaneous
  - Sections 45 to 48: Supplemental
- Part II: Transfer of the undertakings of the British Gas Corporation
  - Sections 49 to 61: Vesting of property of British Gas Corporation, British Gas plc stock, government holding in the successor company, dissolution of the British Gas Corporation
- Part III: Miscellaneous and general
  - Sections 62 to 68: Financial provisions, general interpretation, amendments, transitional provisions, savings and repeals, commencement and extent

of Schedules 1 to 9

=== Effects of the act ===
The act repealed the whole of the Gas Act 1960 (8 & 9 Eliz. 2. c. 27), and parts of the Gas Act 1965, as well as parts of the Gas Act 1972.

Section 1 of the act established the Director-General of Gas Supply and the Office of Gas Regulation (OFGAS). This was an economic regulator, independent of Government but accountable to Parliament. This arrangement separated the regulatory decisions from political control and aimed to give greater long-term regulatory certainty and to encourage market entry and investment. The regulator has since become the Office of Gas and Electricity Markets (OFGEM).

The act was one of the first Thatcher government privatization efforts. The first had been British Telecom in 1984. When British Gas plc was floated on the London Stock Exchange on 8 December 1986, it traded at 135 pence per share, valuing British Gas plc at £9 billion.

The privatization of gas supply and the opening up of the market was one of the factors in the UK's 'Dash for Gas' – the shift from coal-fired to gas-fired power plants in the electricity industry – in the early 1990s. Other factors included regulatory changes by the EU that facilitated the use of gas, technological advances that increased the efficiency of combined cycle gas turbines (CCGT), increased North Sea gas production, and the environmental benefits of reduced carbon dioxide and sulphur dioxide emissions.

In 1994, British Gas plc was reorganized into British Gas and Transco. British Gas owned the offshore supplies, storage, and supply contracts. The onshore pipeline system, the National Transmission System (NTS), was independently operated by Transco.

In preparation for the further opening up of the gas markets to competition in 1996, British Gas plc went through a process of restructuring to separate the company into five new divisions, which entailed a substantial reduction of staff.

The act does not apply to Northern Ireland.

== Later amending acts ==
Gas Act 1995 (Note: Section 18(1).)
- Act of Parliament
- Parliament of the United Kingdom
- Long title: An Act to amend Parts I and III of the Gas Act 1986; to make provision for requiring the owners of certain gas processing facilities to make them available to other persons; and for connected purposes.
- Citation: 1995 c. 45
- Territorial extent: England and Wales; Scotland; Northern Ireland (in part); (Note: Section 18(5).)

Dates
- Royal assent: 8 November 1995
- Commencement: various (Note: Section 18(2)–(4). The Gas Act 1995 (Appointed Day and Commencement) Order 1996 (SI 1996/218).)

Other legislation
- Amends: Landlord and Tenant Act 1927; Public Health Act 1936; Statistics of Trade Act 1947; Rights of Entry (Gas and Electricity Boards) Act 1954; Pipe-lines Act 1962; Gas Act 1965; Local Government (Scotland) Act 1966; Post Office Act 1969; Fair Trading Act 1973; Health and Safety at Work etc. Act 1974; Energy Act 1976; Water (Scotland) Act 1980; Bankruptcy (Scotland) Act 1985; Gas Act 1986; Insolvency Act 1986; Consumer Protection Act 1987; Road Traffic (Driver Licensing and Information Systems) Act 1989; Electricity Act 1989; Town and Country Planning Act 1990; Planning (Listed Buildings and Conservation Areas) Act 1990; Planning (Hazardous Substances) Act 1990; Enterprise and New Towns (Scotland) Act 1990; New Roads and Street Works Act 1991; Natural Heritage (Scotland) Act 1991; Water Industry Act 1991; Water Resources Act 1991; Land Drainage Act 1991; [[[Offshore Safety Act 1992]]; Competition and Service (Utilities) Act 1992; Gas (Exempt Supplies) Act 1993; Local Government (Wales) Act 1994; Central Rating Lists Regulations 1994; Local Government etc. (Scotland) Act 1994; Deregulation and Contracting Out Act 1994
- Amended by: Planning (Consequential Provisions) (Scotland) Act 1997; Local Government and Rating Act 1997; Finance Act 1998; Government of Wales Act 1998; Postal Services Act 2000; Utilities Act 2000; Competition Act 1998 (Transitional, Consequential and Supplemental Provisions) Order 2000; Gas (Third Party Access and Accounts) Regulations 2000; Housing Act 2004; Civil Contingencies Act 2004; General Product Safety Regulations 2005; Flood Risk Management (Scotland) Act 2009; Energy Act 2011; Deregulation Act 2015; Bankruptcy (Scotland) Act 2016 (Consequential Provisions and Modifications) Order 2016; Digital Economy Act 2017; Forestry and Land Management (Scotland) Act 2018

Status: Amended

Text of statute as originally enacted

Revised text of statute as amended

Text of the Gas Act 1995 as in force today (including any amendments) within the United Kingdom, from legislation.gov.uk.

The Gas Act 1995 (c. 45) amended Parts I and III of the 1986 act, establishing provisions for requiring the owners of certain gas processing facilities to make them available to other organizations.

Section 1 of the Utilities Act 2000 established the Office of Gas and Electricity Markets (OFGEM), which merged and abolished the Office of Gas Supply (OFGAS) and Office of Electricity Regulation (OFFER).

== See also ==
- Energy policy of the United Kingdom
- Energy in the United Kingdom
