= Gas Act 1965 =

Act of the Parliament of the United Kingdom

Gas Act 1965 (Note: Section 32(1).)
- Act of Parliament
- Parliament of the United Kingdom
- Long title: An Act to confer additional functions on the Gas Council and to make further provision as to the rating of the Gas Council and Area Gas Boards; to increase the number of members of the Gas Council; to regulate and facilitate the storage of gas by the Council and those Boards in underground strata, and to modify section 52 of the Gas Act 1948; and for connected purposes.
- Citation: 1965 c. 36
- Introduced by: Minister without Portfolio, Lord Champion, 20 May 1965 Second Reading (Lords)
- Territorial extent: England and Wales; Scotland; (Note: Section 32(4).)

Dates
- Royal assent: 5 August 1965
- Commencement: 5 August 1965 (except part II) (Note: Section 32(5).); 1 December 1965 (part II) (Note: Section 32(5). The Gas Act 1965 (Commencement) Order 1965 (SI 1965/1983).)
Other legislation
Amends	Gas Act 1948; Rights of Entry (Gas and Electricity Boards) Act 1954
Amended by	General Rate Act 1967; National Loans Act 1968; Gas and Electricity Act 1968; Minister of Technology Order 1969; Gas Act 1972; Local Authorities etc. (Miscellaneous Provision) (No. 2) Order 1974; Local Land Charges Act 1975; Criminal Procedure (Scotland) Act 1975; Fatal Accidents and Sudden Deaths Inquiry (Scotland) Act 1976; Statute Law (Repeals) Act 1978; Water (Scotland) Act 1980; Magistrates' Courts Act 1980; Acquisition of Land Act 1981; Criminal Justice Act 1982; Local Government Act 1985; Gas Act 1986; Water Act 1989; Statute Law (Repeals) Act 1989; Planning (Consequential Provisions) Act 1990; Water Resources Act 1991; Water Consolidation (Consequential Provisions) Act 1991; Solicitors' Incorporated Practices Order 1991; Local Government (Wales) Act 1994; Coal Industry Act 1994; Gas Act 1995; Environment Act 1995 (Consequential and Transitional Provisions) (Scotland) Regulations 1996; Abolition of Feudal Tenure etc. (Scotland) Act 2000; Land Registration Act 2002; Water Industry (Scotland) Act 2002 (Consequential Modifications) Order 2004; Church of England (Miscellaneous Provisions) Measure 2006; Planning Act 2008; Transfer of Tribunal Functions (Lands Tribunal and Miscellaneous Amendments) Order 2009; Police and Fire Reform (Scotland) Act 2012; Natural Resources Body for Wales (Functions) Order 2013; Inquiries into Fatal Accidents and Sudden Deaths etc. (Scotland) Act 2016
Relates to	Gas (Borrowing Powers) Act 1965

Status: Amended

Text of statute as originally enacted

Revised text of statute as amended

Text of the Gas Act 1965 as in force today (including any amendments) within the United Kingdom, from legislation.gov.uk.

The Gas Act 1965 (c. 36) is an act of the Parliament of the United Kingdom which extended the powers of the Gas Council to buy, make or supply gas; it authorised and controlled the underground storage of gas; and permitted the sale of industrial gas for non-fuel purposes. The act was in response to changing technologies that had developed since the gas industry was nationalised in 1949.

To finance the increased scope of the Gas Council the Gas (Borrowing Powers) Act 1965 (c. 60) was enacted which increased the council's borrowing powers to up to £1,200 million.

== Background ==
The government recognised that there had been significant technological progress and changes in the gas industry since nationalisation in 1949. There were new possibilities of undertaking large-scale supply schemes associated with the import of liquefied natural gas from Algeria and the discovery of natural gas on the UK Continental Shelf. There were also opportunities for underground gas storage. Such storage enabled the industry to build up a reserve of gas in summer, when demand was low, which was drawn down to meet the higher demand in winter.

The Gas Act 1965 had two main purposes: to make changes in the structure of the gas industry; and to allow the industry to develop underground storage of gas in natural strata. A subsidiary purpose was to amend Section 52 of the 1948 Act dealing with the industry's monopoly of piped gas supplies for use as fuel. The Gas Council was given powers to manufacture gas and supply it to the area gas boards.

The increased scope of work of the Gas Council was financed by increased borrowing. The limit had been £650 million, the Gas (Borrowing Powers) Act 1965 was enacted which increased the Council’s borrowing to up to £1,200 million.

== Gas Act 1965 ==
The Gas Act 1965 received royal assent on 5 August 1965. Its long title is: ‘An Act to confer additional functions on the Gas Council and to make further provision as to the rating of the Gas Council and Area Gas Boards; to increase the number of members of the Gas Council; to regulate and facilitate the storage of gas by the Council and those Boards in underground strata, and to modify section 52 of the Gas Act 1948; and for connected purposes.’

=== Provisions ===
The provisions of the act comprise 37 Sections in 3 Parts and 6 Schedules

- Part I – The Gas Council
  - Section 1. Empowered the Gas Council to manufacture and supply gas and solid fuels
  - Section 2. Empowered the Minister to appoint additional members of the Gas Council
  - Section 3. Rating of the Gas Council and other gas authorities
- Part II – Underground storage of gas by gas authorities
  - Sections 4 to 28 concerning the authorisation, control, compensation, rights, responsibilities liabilities, safety conditions for the underground storage of gas
- Part III – General
  - Section 29. Modification of section 52 of principal Act, allowed sale of gas for industrial purposes which do not consist of or include the use as a fuel
  - Section 30. General powers of gas authorities
  - Section 31. Financial provisions
  - Section 32. Short title, interpretation, extent and commencement
- Schedules
  - Schedule 1. Amendments as respects functions of Gas Council
  - Schedule 2. Storage Authorisation Orders
  - Schedule 3. Certificates and Statutory Licences
  - Schedule 4. Acquisition of land
  - Schedule 5. Inquiries into accidents
  - Schedule 6. Power to enter land and to prospect and survey Land

== Consequences of the act ==
The effect of the act was to put the Gas Council on a par with the area gas boards. It was enabled ‘to manufacture gas, to get or acquire gas in or from Great Britain or elsewhere and to supply gas in bulk to any area board. It was also enabled to manufacture, treat, supply or sell solid fuels, products or by-products, in the same way as the area boards.

The Gas Council played an increasing role in the direction of the British gas industry. It acted as the central purchaser of natural gas from Algeria and the North Sea, the distribution of which was national enterprise.

The act allowed the Minister to appoint three extra members to the Gas Council board, this was increased to five in 1968.

== Gas (Borrowing Powers) Act 1965 ==
Gas (Borrowing Powers) Act 1965 (Note: Section 2.)
- Act of Parliament
- Parliament of the United Kingdom
- Long title: An Act to increase the amount which may be borrowed by the Gas Council and Area Boards under the Gas Act 1948.
- Citation: 1965 c. 60
- Territorial extent: United Kingdom

Dates
- Royal assent: 5 August 1965
- Commencement: 5 August 1965 (Note: The Acts of Parliament (Commencement) Act 1793.)
- Repealed: 3 July 1968
Other legislation
Amends	Gas Act 1948; Electricity and Gas Act 1963
Repealed by	Gas and Electricity Act 1968
Relates to	Gas Act 1965

Status: Repealed

Text of statute as originally enacted

The increased remit of the Gas Council was reflected in the Gas (Borrowing Powers) Act 1965 (c. 60) which was enacted to increase the council's financial limit from £650 million to £900 million, although the Minister of Power was empowered to increase this to £1,200 million. The Gas Council expected that £1,000 million would cover its requirements to 1970.

As a consequence of the Section 1(3)(a) of the Gas and Electricity Act 1968 the 1965 act ceased to have effect.

== Later enactments ==
Sections 1–3, 29 and 30 of the 1965 Act were repealed by the Gas Act 1972.

The Gas Act 1986 amended parts of the Gas Act 1965

== See also ==
- Oil and gas industry in the United Kingdom
- British Gas
