= Gas Council =

1949–1972 UK government body

- Type: State-owned enterprise
- Industry: Energy: Gas
- Founded: 1 May 1949
- Defunct: 31 December 1972
- Fate: Abolished in restructuring of the industry
- Successor: British Gas Corporation
- Headquarters: London, United Kingdom
- Area served: England, Wales and Scotland
- Key people: see text (chairman and deputy chairman)
- Services: Gas industry coordination and regulation
- Members: 14 on management board
- Divisions: Economic Planning, Production and Supply, Research and Development, and (from 1968) Marketing

The Gas Council was a UK government body that provided strategic oversight of the gas industry in England, Wales and Scotland between 1949 and 1972.

The British gas industry was nationalised under the provisions of the Gas Act 1948 (11 & 12 Geo. 6. c. 67) which established the Gas Council with effect from 1 May 1949. The council acted as channel of communication between the Minister of Fuel and Power and the industry; it carried out research; undertook labour negotiations on matters such as wages; and acted as the voice of the gas industry.

The Gas Council was abolished on 31 December 1972 under the terms of the Gas Act 1972 (c. 60). This restructuring of the gas industry, to manage the advent of North Sea gas, established the British Gas Corporation to centralise control and operation of the industry.

== Background ==
Prior to nationalisation there were about 1,064 gas supply undertakings in Britain; about one-third were municipal local authority undertakings and about two-thirds were company undertakings.

In June 1944 the Minister of Fuel and Power appointed a committee of inquiry under the chairmanship of Geoffrey Heyworth to review the structure and organisation of the industry and advise on changes to develop and cheapen gas supplies. The committee reported in November 1945 and recommended the compulsory purchase by the government of all undertakings and the creation of ten regional gas boards. The Heyworth Committee report formed the basis of the Gas Act 1948.

The Gas Act 1948 was one of a number of acts promulgated by the post-war Labour government to nationalise elements of the UK's industrial infrastructure; other Acts include the Coal Industry Nationalisation Act 1946; the Transport Act 1947 (railways and long-distance road haulage); the Electricity Act 1947; and the Iron and Steel Act 1949.

The industry was fragmented with limited cooperation and coordination between undertakings. The exception were some industry-wide bodies with an interest in aspects of the industry. These included the National Gas Council which was established in 1916 to deal with matters that affected the whole of the industry, it included representatives of all the governing bodies. The British Commercial Gas Association was founded in 1912 and served as the publicity agency for the industry. There was also the National Federation of Gas Coke Associations, the Federation of Gas Employers, and the Association of Gas Corporations. The British Gas Federation was established in 1934 to represent collective interests of the council and association. In 1943 the industry proposed the establishment of the British Gas Council amalgamating the two existing bodies. The new organisation was established in 1946 as a company limited by guarantee. It represented 95 percent of the gas suppliers in Britain. It was chaired by Sir Edgar Sylvester (later chairman of the Gas Council) and its aim was to oppose nationalisation. The Gas Council, under Section 62 of the 1948 act, took over these bodies. Under section 2 of the Gas (Allocation of Undertakings to Area Boards and Gas Council) Order 1949 (SI 1949/742), it also took over the North Western Gas Corporation, a gas holding company that had been formed in 1947 to take over the town gas interests of the General Gas and Electricity Company.

Ministerial oversight of the gas industry prior to nationalisation was exercised by the Board of Trade until 1942, then the Ministry of Fuel and Power (1942 – 1949).

The Gas Act 1948 establish twelve area gas boards, which assumed ownership of the gas undertakings. The act also established the Gas Council. The Act took effect from 1 May 1949.

== Responsibilities ==
The Gas Council's formal responsibilities were defined in section 22 of the Gas Act 1948:

(a) to advise the minister in questions affecting the gas industry and matters relating thereto;
(b) to promote and assist the efficient exercise and performance by area boards of their function.

The council's legal powers were extended by the Gas Act 1965 (c. 36) to allow it to borrow more money and to manufacture or acquire gas and supply gas in bulk to area boards.

== Corporate structure ==
The Gas Council consisted of a chairman and a deputy chairman, both appointed by the Minister of Fuel and Power, and the chairman of each of the 12 area gas boards, as appointed by the minister. In 1951 the council was constituted as shown. The area board represented by each of the board chairs are given in brackets.

- Sir Edgar Sylvester, Chairman
- Colonel Harold C. Smith, Deputy Chairman
- Sir Andrew G. Clow (Scottish)
- E. Crowther (Northern)
- D. P. Welman (North Western)
- Dr. R. S. Edwards (North Eastern)
- Henry Frank Harding Jones (East Midlands)
- G. le B. Diamond (West Midlands)
- T. Mervyn Jones (Wales)
- Sir John W. Stephenson (Eastern)
- M. Milne-Watson (North Thames)
- W. K. Hutchinson (South Eastern)
- O. R. Guard (Southern)
- C. H. Chester (South Western)

=== Chairmen and deputy chairmen ===
Throughout its operational life of 23 years there were four chairmen of the Gas Council:

- Sir Edgar Sylvester (1891–1969), 1949 – 1952
- Colonel Sir Harold Charles Smith (1890–1970), 1952 – 1959
- Sir Henry Frank Harding Jones (1906–1987), 1960 – 1972
- Sir Arthur Ford Hetherington (1911–2002), 1972 – 1972

And there were five deputy chairmen:

- Colonel Sir Harold Charles Smith (1890–1970), 1949 – 1952
- Sir Henry Frank Harding Jones (1906–1987), 1952 – 1959
- Sir Kenneth Hutchison (1903–1989), 1960 – 1967
- Sir Arthur Ford Hetherington (1911–2002), 1967 –1972
- Sir Denis Rooke (1924 – 2008), 1972 –1972

Upon the establishment of the British Gas Corporation on 1 January 1973 the chairman and deputy chairman of the abolished Gas Council, Sir Arthur Hetherington and Denis Rooke, took similar roles in the new corporation to provide continuity.

=== Gas consultative councils and committees ===
Provisions were made for each area board to have a gas consultative council and district committees. They were charged with considering any matter affecting the supply of gas in the area; and of considering and reporting to the area board any such matter. Each council had between 20 and 30 members. The annual reports of the Gas Council identify the work of the consultative councils which recognised that they were an important part of the interpretation of the Gas Council's policy to the public. The councils had a chairman, a deputy chairman and a secretary. There were members appointed as representatives of local authorities (under Section 9(2)(a) of the Gas Act), as representatives of commerce, industry, labour and other interests (Section 9(2)(b)). The North Thames Gas Consultative Council had four district committees for: Berkshire and Buckinghamshire; Central and North London; East London and Essex; and West London and Surrey.

=== Ministerial oversight ===
Following nationalisation, the Minister of Fuel and Power appointed the chairman and deputy chairman of the Gas Council and the chairmen of the twelve area boards until 1957. This function then devolved to the renamed Ministry of Power (1957 – 1969), then to the Ministry of Technology (1969 – 1970), and finally to the Department of Trade and Industry (1970 – 1972) through various government reorganisations.

== Operations ==
To achieve the Gas Council's aims and statutory obligations it undertook a range of activities.

=== Activities ===
In 1953 the Gas Council formed D’Arcy Exploration as a joint venture with BP. It allocated £1 million to search for natural gas on land; in 1954 gas was found at Cousland near Edinburgh.

The Midlands Research Station was opened at Solihull in 1954.

The Gas Council presided over two major changes in the technological basis of the industry. Firstly, from the late 1950s, a shift way from conventional carbonising plant for the production of town gas to chemical reforming using light feedstocks from oil refineries. And secondly the conversion of the gas supply from town gas to natural gas as North Sea gas became available from 1967.

The first transnational shipment of liquefied natural gas took place left the USA on 25 January 1959, arriving at a new LNG terminal on Canvey Island 27 days later. The council was responsible for the construction of an 18-inch diameter methane pipeline from Canvey to Leeds to supply methane feedstock for reforming plant to most area boards. Following this successful trial a full scale LNG plant was built at Canvey taking LNG from Algeria.

The Gas Act 1960 increased the Gas Council's borrowing powers to £500 million.

The Gas Act 1965 (c. 36) and the Gas (Borrowing Powers) Act 1965 (c. 60) increased the council's borrowing powers to £1,200 million; it was also allowed to manufacture or acquire gas and supply gas in bulk to Area Boards. The new powers allowed it to enter joint ventures with Amoco on parts of the Leman and Indefatigable gas fields.

The Gas Advisory Council was established in 1965 to allow workers and management and trade unions to discuss national objectives.

The Gas Council chairman Sir Henry Jones announced in 1966 that Britain would convert from manufactured to natural gas and formed a Conversion Executive. A Gas Conversion Association was also established to represent the interests of contractors.

A contract was made with BP in 1967 to purchase natural gas from the West Sole Field. This was to be 50 million cubic feet per day for 15 years. The Gas Council offered 2.5d. to 4d. per therm whereas BP proposed 6d. to 7d. a therm. After an intervention from the minister a figure of 5d. was agreed. Soon after 25-year contracts were made with Phillips, Shell/Esso and Gas Council/Amoco for gas from fields (Hewett, Leman and Indefatigable) feeding the Bacton terminal in Norfolk. At both Easington, where gas from West Sole landed, and at Bacton the council built terminals to receive cleaned gas which was then metered; blended; had odorant added; and had the flow controlled. The Gas Council built a network of 36-inch diameter pipelines to transmit the gas, which was to become the National Transmission System.

In 1968 a major restructuring of the Gas Council was undertaken, driven by the advent of natural gas and the need to plan nationally. The area boards which had been accountable directly to the minister, now had their activities channelled though the council. A central marketing office was established for selling gas to large industrial customers, the director sat on the Gas Council board. As well as Marketing there were divisions for Economic Planning, Production and Supply; Research and Development and Personnel, whose directors were on the board. The deputy chairman Arthur Hetherington became the chief executive.

The Gas Council/Amoco group discovered oil in Block 22/18 of the North Sea in 1971, in what were to be named the Arbroath and Montrose oil fields.

=== Publications ===
The Gas Council published a range of material to meet statutory obligations and to inform commercial and domestic consumers. These included:

- Annual Report and Accounts (1950 to 1972)
- D. Chandler and A. D. Lacey (The Gas Council), The Rise of the Gas Industry in Britain 1949
- Mr. Therm Goes Country 160 Famous County Recipes 1951
- Gas in your home 1952
- Coke-Fired Crop Drying Plant 1958
- Coke Burning Appliances Handbook 1959
- Food Leaflet 'Jam Making & Fruit Bottling' 1960
- The Gas Council's Catering Handbook 1960
- F. J. Dent, Principles of new gas making processes, 1965
- The Underground Storage of Gas, 1965
- Natural Gas from the Sahara, 1965
- Natural gas from the North Sea 1967
- Britain's natural gas 1972

== Abolition ==
In 1969 the government recognised that to fully exploit the benefits of North Sea Gas a radical reorganisation of the industry was needed with increased power to the centre. A bill to realise these changes was introduced in Parliament by the Labour government in November 1969. However, this bill failed as Parliament was dissolved for the 1970 general election. The Conservative government introduced a new bill in 1972 to put full responsibility for the gas industry into a new statutory body, the British Gas Corporation. The Gas Act 1972 (c. 60) received royal assent on 9 August 1972 and came into force on 1 January 1973. The Gas Council was thereby abolished.

== See also ==
- Electricity Council
