= Iron and Steel Act 1949 =

Act of the Parliament of the United Kingdom

Iron and Steel Act 1949 (Note: Section 61(1).)
- Act of Parliament
- Parliament of the United Kingdom
- Long title: An Act to provide for the establishment of an Iron and Steel Corporation of Great Britain and for defining their functions, and for the transfer to that Corporation of the securities of certain companies engaged in the working, getting and smelting of iron ore, the production of steel, and the shaping of steel by rolling, and of certain property and rights held by a Minister of the Crown or Government department; for the licensing of persons engaged in any such activities; for co-ordinating the activities of the Corporation, the National Coal Board and the Area Gas Boards relating to carbonisation; and for purposes connected with the matters aforesaid.
- Citation: 12, 13 & 14 Geo. 6. c. 72
- Territorial extent: England and Wales; Scotland; (Note: Section 61(2).)

Dates
- Royal assent: 24 November 1949
- Commencement: 23 October 1950 (Note: Section 1(3).)
- Repealed: 12 December 1975
Other legislation
Amended by	Iron and Steel Act 1953; Iron and Steel Act 1967
Repealed by	Iron and Steel Act 1969; Gas Act 1972; Iron and Steel Act 1975
Relates to	Electricity Act 1947; Transport Act 1947; Gas Act 1948; Iron and Steel Act 1967

Status: Repealed

Text of statute as originally enacted

The Iron and Steel Act 1949 (12, 13 & 14 Geo. 6. c. 72) was an act of the Parliament of the United Kingdom which nationalised, or bought into state control, elements of the iron and steel industry in Great Britain. It established an Iron and Steel Corporation which acquired certain iron and steel companies. In a departure from earlier nationalisations the Corporation only acquired the share capital of the companies, not the undertakings themselves. The individual companies continued to operate under management Boards appointed by the corporation. The act was one of a number of acts promulgated by the post-war Labour government to nationalise elements of the UK's industrial infrastructure; other acts include the Coal Industry Nationalisation Act 1946 (9 & 10 Geo. 6. c. 59); Transport Act 1947 (10 & 11 Geo. 6. c. 49), which included railways and long-distance road haulage; the Electricity Act 1947 (10 & 11 Geo. 6. c. 54); and the Gas Act 1948 (11 & 12 Geo. 6. c. 67).

== Background ==
The involvement of the UK government in the iron and steel industry began in the interwar period with the establishment of the British Iron and Steel Federation to represent companies in the industry, and which fixed prices, production quotas, levies, and closed redundant works under Government supervision.

The iron and steel industry came under the control of the Ministry of Supply during the Second World War.

In 1945 the Permanent Secretary of the Ministry, Sir Oliver Franks, published a report on the future of the industry. Franks recommended a radical modernisation with the aim of reducing prices to keep British steel competitive on the world market. In 1946 the Labour government established an Iron and Steel Board, to control the price of raw materials, finished products, and steel imports; and to regulate investment, pooling arrangements, and the development of new plant and equipment. Board members were appointed by the Minister of Supply and represented industry employers, workers and consumers. Full nationalisation of the industry, as opposed to government control, had been pledged by the incoming Labour government in 1945; however, this was a controversial issue and was opposed by the iron and steel companies and by the Conservative opposition.

== Provisions of the Bill ==
The Iron and Steel Bill as first drafted comprised 46 clauses under 8 headings.

- National Iron and Steel Board
  - Clauses 1–4: Establishment of the National Iron and Steel Board; its constitution and appointment by the Minister of Supply; its duties; permitted activities; power to establish and liquidate its companies.
- Powers of the Minister in relation to the Board
  - Clauses 5–8: General directions; framing of programmes; annual reports and accounts; consultation on the acquisition and disposing of undertakings,
- Registration and Licensing of Iron and Steel Undertakings
  - Clauses 9–11: Undertakings to register with the Minister; calling for information; requirement to have a licence,
- Acquisition of Undertakings by the Board
  - Clauses 12–22: Acquisition notices; securities; representation of shareholders; rights of transferred companies to continue to use assets; efficient operation; limitation of dividends,
- Terms of Purchase
  - Clauses 23–25: Compensation for transferred assets,
- Financial Provisions
  - Clauses 26–35: Borrowing and raising money; creating and issuing of stock; reserve fund; accounts and annual statement,
- Arbitration Tribunal
  - Clauses 36–38: Establishment of tribunal; remuneration; enforcement Orders,
- Miscellaneous and General
  - Clauses 39–46: Acquisition of land; terms and conditions of employment; making of Regulations; prohibition of iron ore import; liabilities and penalties; interpretation; application to Northern Ireland.

During the passage of the Bill through Parliament the proposed Iron and Steel Board became the Iron and Steel Corporation.

== Enactment and provisions ==
The Iron and Steel Act 1949 (12, 13 & 14 Geo. 6. c. 72) received royal assent on 24 November 1949.

The Iron and Steel Corporation of Great Britain was established under the provisions of the act with effect from October 1950. It brought 94 iron and steel companies into public ownership with effect from vesting day, the 15 February 1951.

The 1949 Act also established an Iron and Steel Consumers' Council. This had the duty ‘of making representations to the Minister on such matters affecting the interests of the consumers as the Council think necessary’.

=== Operation of the act ===
The model of nationalisation enacted by the 1949 act was different to earlier ones, such as Coal Industry Nationalisation Act 1946. Only the share capital of the companies was acquired, not the undertakings themselves. The individual companies therefore continued to operate under management Boards appointed by the corporation. The mode of nationalisation was distinct because many iron and steel companies undertook other integrated activities, that could not easily be segregated into their individual functions. For example, the manufacturers of motor vehicles, which undertook steel processing, were excluded. About 2,000 iron and steel companies operated outside the nationalised sector.

=== Observations on the act ===
The 1949 act has been seen as both the culmination of the Labour government's nationalisation policy and as a major departure from that policy. It completed the list of major industrial infrastructures to be brought into state control and introduced collective ownership, and a certain amount of competition, into a manufacturing industry. It has also been seen as significant as it 'sheds light on the policy of nationalisation'. It has been described as being doctrinally inspired. And 'a highly exceptional measure... pushed through Parliament with great vigour and determination'. It has been seen as ‘nationalisation for clearly ideological reasons’; since the government 'was so persistent with a measure which can fairly be described as in no way popular'. It was argued that the iron and steel industry was progressive and efficient with good labour relations. And that public ownership was necessary to compel the industry to follow a policy in the national interest. Although different to the nationalisation of the coal, transport, electricity and gas industries the method of nationalisation through the acquisition of shares was similar to that used for the Bank of England (1946) and Cable and Wireless Limited (1947).

== Government policy and later enactments ==
Iron and Steel Act 1953 (Note: Section 36(1).)
- Act of Parliament
- Parliament of the United Kingdom
- Long title: An Act to repeal the Iron and Steel Act, 1949, and to dissolve the Iron and Steel Corporation of Great Britain; to establish an Iron and Steel Board for the supervision of the iron and steel industry and to define the functions of that Board, and to make other provision as to the said industry; to provide for the return of iron and steel undertakings to private ownership and for the disposal of the property, rights, liabilities and obligations of the said Corporation; and for purposes connected with the matters aforesaid.
- Citation: 1 & 2 Eliz. 2. c. 15
- Territorial extent: United Kingdom

Dates
- Royal assent: 14 May 1953
- Commencement: 13 July 1953 (Note: Section 1(1). The Iron and Steel Act 1953 (Appointed Day) Order 1953 (SI 1953/1019).)
- Repealed: 12 December 1975
Other legislation
Repeals/revokes	Iron and Steel Act 1949
Repealed by	House of Commons Disqualification Act 1957; Tribunals and Inquiries Act 1958; Statute Law Revision Act 1963; Iron and Steel Act 1967; National Loans Act 1968; European Communities Act 1972; Statute Law (Repeals) Act 1974; Iron and Steel Act 1975

Status: Repealed

Text of statute as originally enacted

Nationalisation of iron and steel production had been strongly opposed by the Conservative opposition. The act went into effect in February 1951, meaning that its implementation would occur during the 1951 general election season. On returning to power in October 1951 they planned to denationalise and return the industry to the private sector. This policy was enacted through the Iron and Steel Act 1953.

The Iron and Steel Act 1953 (1 & 2 Eliz. 2. c. 15) received royal assent on 14 May 1953.

Section 1 of the 1953 act repealed the Iron and Steel Act 1949 and dissolved the Iron and Steel Corporation. It transferred the corporation's properties, rights, liabilities and obligations to a newly established Iron and Steel Holding and Realisation Agency. The agency gradually sold the nationalised companies back into the private sector with the exception of Richard Thomas and Baldwins which remained in public ownership until it was absorbed into the British Steel Corporation in 1967.

The 1953 act also established a new Iron and Steel Board which began operating on 13 July 1953. The board had a duty 'to exercise a general supervision over the iron and steel industry... with a view to promoting the efficient, economic and adequate supply, under competitive conditions, of iron and steel products'. The work of the board and the agency was thus parallel and complementary.

== Subsequent developments ==
The 1953 act remained in force until the Labour government re-nationalised the iron and steel industry in 1967 through the Iron and Steel Act 1967.

The whole act, so far as unrepealed, was repealed by section 38(3) of, and schedule 7 to, the Iron and Steel Act 1975, which came into force on 12 December 1975.

== See also ==
- Iron and Steel Corporation of Great Britain
- Iron and Steel Act 1967
- Steel Industry (Special Measures) Act 2025
