= Gas Act 1972 =

Act of the Parliament of the United Kingdom

Gas Act 1972 (Note: Section 50(1).)
- Act of Parliament
- Parliament of the United Kingdom
- Long title: An Act to make fresh provision with respect to the gas industry in Great Britain and related matters, and for purposes connected therewith.
- Citation: 1972 c. 60
- Territorial extent: England and Wales; Scotland; (Note: Section 50(2).)

Dates
- Royal assent: 9 August 1972
- Commencement: 1 January 1973 (Note: Section 1(1). The Gas Act 1972 (Appointed Day) Order 1972 (SI 1972/1440).)
- Repealed: 28 February 1990 (Note: The British Gas Corporation (Dissolution) Order 1990 (SI 1990/147).)
Other legislation
Amends	Iron and Steel Act 1949; Gas Act 1965
Repeals/revokes	London Gas Undertakings (Regulations) Act 1939; Gas Act 1948; Gas Act 1960
Amended by	House of Commons Disqualification Act 1975; Iron and Steel Act 1975; Energy Act 1976; Land Drainage Act 1976; Statute Law (Repeals) Act 1977; Overseas Development and Co-operation Act 1980; Highways Act 1980; Acquisition of Land Act 1981; Oil and Gas (Enterprise) Act 1982; Gas Act 1972 (Modifications) Order 1983; Gas Act 1972 (Modifications) (Amendment) Order 1983; Statute Law (Repeals) Act 1986
Repealed by	Gas Act 1986

Status: Repealed

Text of statute as originally enacted

Revised text of statute as amended

The Gas Act 1972 (c. 60) was an act of the Parliament of the United Kingdom which restructured the British gas industry. It established the British Gas Corporation to exercise full responsibility for the oversight, control and operation of the gas industry. The twelve autonomous area gas boards which had managed the industry in their areas were dissolved and became regions of the British Gas Corporation. The Gas Council, also established under the Gas Act 1948 (11 & 12 Geo. 6. c. 67), continued in existence under the new name of the British Gas Corporation, and the 1948 act was repealed. The provisions of the act came into force on 1 January 1973.

== Background ==
The principal role of the twelve area gas boards, established under the Gas Act 1948 (11 & 12 Geo. 6. c. 67), was to maintain a supply of gas to match the demand. This was through the operation of local gas works manufacturing gas by coal carbonisation or catalytic reforming of refinery light-end products such as methane, naphtha or light oils. The advent of natural gas from the North Sea, first landed onshore in 1967, shifted the concerns about supply from an area to a national basis. Gas was now fed to an area rather than being manufactured within the area.

In 1969 the government recognised that to fully exploit the benefits of North Sea Gas a radical reorganisation of the industry was needed with increased central power. A Bill to realise these changes was introduced in Parliament by the Labour government in November 1969. However, this Bill failed when Parliament was dissolved for the May 1970 general election. The Conservative government introduced a new Bill in Parliament in January 1972 to put full responsibility for the gas industry into a new statutory body the British Gas Corporation.

== Provisions ==
The act received royal assent on 9 August 1972. Its long title was: ‘An Act to make fresh provision with respect to the gas industry in Great Britain and related matters, and for purposes connected therewith’.

The act had 50 sections in four parts, plus eight schedules.

Part I defined a new structure for British gas industry. This included the establishment of the British Gas Corporation, its duties and powers, programmes for substantial capital outlay, and the powers of, and reports to, the Secretary of State. It established consumers' bodies such as the National Gas Consumers' Council and the Regional Gas Consumers' Councils, and defined their functions and local representation. The corporation had a specific duty ‘to develop and maintain an efficient, co-ordinated and economical system of gas supply for Great Britain and to satisfy, so far as is economical to do so, all reasonable demands for gas in Great Britain’.

Part II established financial provisions, including the general financial duties of the British Gas Corporation, its borrowing powers, the issue of British Gas Stock, keeping of accounts and audits.

Part III established provisions for the supply and use of gas. This included methods of charge and tariffs, standards of quality, the Gas Supply Code (Schedule 4), restrictions on supply by persons other than the Corporation, and related provisions. It also defined meter testing and stamping and the power to make safety regulations.

Part IV defined the position of the corporation with respect to taxation, pension rights, penalties, prosecutions, and offences by corporations, and establishment of inquiries.

Schedule 8 defined statute repeals.

=== Repealed enactments ===
Section 49(3) of the act repealed 21 enactments, listed in schedule 8 to the act.

Citation	Short title	Extent of repeal
2 & 3 Geo. 6. c. xcix	London Gas Undertakings (Regulations) Act 1939	The whole act.
11 & 12 Geo. 6. c. 67	Gas Act 1948	The whole act.
12 & 13 Geo. 6. c. 72	Iron and Steel Act 1949	In section 47, the words from "with the Gas Council" to "are to be carried on".
14 Geo. 6. c. 39	Public Utilities Street Works Act 1950	In Schedule 5, the entries relating to the Gas Act 1948.
2 & 3 Eliz. 2. c. 21	Rights of Entry (Gas and Electricity Boards) Act 1954	In section 3(1), the definition of "Gas Board".
4 & 5 Eliz. 2. c. 60	Valuation and Rating (Scotland) Act 1956	In section 24, in subsection (1) the words "the year 1961–1962 or", in subsection (2) the words "except as provided in this Part of this Act", and in subsection (4) the words "and the next following". In section 43(1), the definition of "Gas Board". In Schedule 4, paragraph 12.
5 & 6 Eliz. 2. c. 20	House of Commons Disqualification Act 1957	In Part II of Schedule 1, the words "An Area Gas Board" and the words "The Gas Council".
5 & 6 Eliz. 2. c. 56	Housing Act 1957	In section 130, the words "gas boards", the words "and gas works respectively" and the words "or gas".
6 & 7 Eliz. 2. c. 55	Local Government Act 1958	In section 66(1), the definition of "Gas Board".
8 & 9 Eliz. 2. c. 27	Gas Act 1960	The whole act.
9 & 10 Eliz. 2. c. 50	Rivers (Prevention of Pollution) Act 1961	In sections 2(2)(e) and 4(1)(e), the words "paragraph 32 of the Third Schedule to the Gas Act 1948 or".
1963 c. 33	London Government Act 1963	In section 93(3), the words "or gas" and the words "or the Gas Act 1948", and, in Schedule 2, paragraph 31(e).
1963 c. 59	Electricity and Gas Act 1963	In section 2(1), the words "or the Gas Council". In section 3(2), paragraphs (f) and (g). In Schedule 1, the entries relating to the Gas Act 1948.
1964 c. 29	Continental Shelf Act 1964	In section 9(1), the words "and section 52 of the Gas Act 1948 shall not apply to any such gas", and, in section 9(7), the words "'Area Board' has the same meaning as in the Gas Act 1948 and".
1965 c. 13	Rivers (Prevention of Pollution) (Scotland) Act 1965	Section 2(2)(e).
1965 c. 36	Gas Act 1965	Part I. Section 4(8)(a). In section 12(6), the words "another gas authority or". In section 28(1), the definition of "gas authority". Sections 29 and 30. Schedule 1. In Schedule 2, paragraphs 1(1)(a) and 14. In paragraph 1(4) of Schedule 6, the words "or any other gas authority".
1966 c. 51	Local Government (Scotland) Act 1966	In section 18(1), the words "or section 3(1) of the Gas Act 1965". In section 19(1), the words "or section 3(1) of the Gas Act 1965".
1968 c. 13	National Loans Act 1968	In Schedule 1, the entry relating to the Gas Act 1948.
1968 c. 39	Gas and Electricity Act 1968	Sections 1 and 4. In section 5, the words "the Gas Council and an Area Gas Board". Section 6.
1969 c. 32	Finance Act 1969	In Schedule 20, paragraph 26.
1972 c. 17	Electricity Act 1972	In section 1(5), the words "or gas".

== Subsequent developments ==
The Oil and Gas (Enterprise) Act 1982 amended and repealed certain sections of the act.

The act was repealed by section 67(3) and (4) of, and schedules 8 and 9 to, the Gas Act 1986, which privatised the gas industry, in three stages. Sections 1(6), 2(1), 6(5), 9 to 13, 34 and 49 were repealed on 23 August 1986, sections 1(3), 2(2) and (3), 3 to 5, 6(1) to (4) and (6) to (8), 7, 35, 36 and 50 on 24 August 1986, and the remainder of the act, with savings, on 28 February 1990, when the British Gas Corporation was dissolved.
