= Petroleum Act 1998 =

Act of the Parliament of the United Kingdom

Petroleum Act 1998 (Note: Section 53(1).)
- Act of Parliament
- Parliament of the United Kingdom
- Long title: An Act to consolidate certain enactments about petroleum, offshore installations and submarine pipelines.
- Citation: 1998 c. 17
- Introduced by: The Lord Chancellor, Lord Irvine of Lairg (Second Reading) 12 January 1998 (Lords)
- Territorial extent: England and Wales; Scotland; Northern Ireland (in part); (Note: Section 53(2).)

Dates
- Royal assent: 16 June 1998
- Commencement: Various (Note: Section 52.)
Other legislation
Amends	Mining Industry Act 1926; Continental Shelf Act 1964; Miscellaneous Financial Provisions Act 1968; Prevention of Oil Pollution Act 1971; Finance Act 1973; Offshore Petroleum Development (Scotland) Act 1975; Oil Taxation Act 1975; Sex Discrimination Act 1975; Fatal Accidents Act 1976; Fatal Accidents and Sudden Deaths Inquiry (Scotland) Act 1976; Fair Employment (Northern Ireland) Act 1976; Race Relations Act 1976; Energy Act 1976; Sex Discrimination (Northern Ireland) Order 1976; Patents Act 1977; Gas Levy Act 1981; Finance Act 1981; Civil Jurisdiction and Judgments Act 1982; Petroleum Royalties (Relief) Act 1983; Telecommunications Act 1984; Food and Environment Protection Act 1985; Oil and Pipelines Act 1985; Gas Act 1986; Petroleum Act 1987; Territorial Sea Act 1987; Income and Corporation Taxes Act 1988; Petroleum Royalties (Relief) and Continental Shelf Act 1989; Capital Allowances Act 1990; Food Safety Act 1990; Aviation and Maritime Security Act 1990; Social Security Contributions and Benefits Act 1992; Social Security Contributions and Benefits (Northern Ireland) Act 1992; Taxation of Chargeable Gains Act 1992; Offshore Safety Act 1992; Trade Union and Labour Relations (Consolidation) Act 1992; Offshore, and Pipelines, Safety (Northern Ireland) Order 1992; Finance Act 1993; Pension Schemes Act 1993; Coal Industry Act 1994; Merchant Shipping Act 1995; Employment Rights Act 1996; Race Relations (Northern Ireland) Order 1997; See § Repealed enactments
Repeals/revokes	See § Repealed enactments
Amended by	Fair Employment and Treatment (Northern Ireland) Order 1998; Health and Safety (Modifications) Regulations (Northern Ireland) 1999; Scotland Act 1998 (Transfer of Functions to the Scottish Ministers etc.) Order 1999; Competition Act 1998 (Transitional, Consequential and Supplemental Provisions) Order 2000; Capital Allowances Act 2001; Communications Act 2003; Energy Act 2004; Gas (Third Party Access) Regulations 2004; Petroleum Act 1998 (Third Party Access) Order 2007; Energy Act 2008; Companies Act 2006 (Consequential Amendments etc) Order 2008; Marine and Coastal Access Act 2009; Gas and Electricity (Dispute Resolution) Regulations 2009; Corporation Tax Act 2010; Taxation (International and Other Provisions) Act 2010; Energy Act 2011; Storage of Carbon Dioxide (Access to Infrastructure) Regulations 2011; Electricity and Gas (Internal Markets) Regulations 2011; Land Registration etc. (Scotland) Act 2012; Public Bodies (Merger of the Director of Public Prosecutions and the Director of Revenue and Customs Prosecutions) Order 2014; Infrastructure Act 2015; Deregulation Act 2015; Scotland Act 2016; Energy Act 2016; Inquiries into Fatal Accidents and Sudden Deaths etc. (Scotland) Act 2016; Petroleum (Transfer of Functions) Regulations 2016; Inquiries into Fatal Accidents and Sudden Deaths etc. (Scotland) Act 2016 (Consequential Provisions and Modifications) Order 2016; Environmental Permitting (England and Wales) Regulations 2016; Wales Act 2017; Scotland Act 2016 and Wales Act 2017 (Onshore Petroleum) (Consequential Amendments) Regulations 2018; Criminal Justice Act 2003 (Commencement No. 33) and Sentencing Act 2020 (Commencement No. 2) Regulations 2022; Energy Act 2023; Judicial Review and Courts Act 2022 (Magistrates' Court Sentencing Powers) Regulations 2023; Planning (Consequential Provisions) (Wales) Act 2026

Status: Amended

Text of statute as originally enacted

Revised text of statute as amended

The Petroleum Act 1998 (c. 17) is an act of the Parliament of the United Kingdom which consolidated arrangements for the licensing, operation and abandonment of offshore installations and pipelines. As a consolidation Act, it did not change the substantive law, although certain acts were amended and repealed.

== Background ==
This was a consolidation act which brought together a number of enactments on petroleum. It dealt with rights and licences to search for and get petroleum; the application of criminal and civil law to offshore activities; authorisations for submarine pipelines; and the decommissioning of offshore installations and pipelines. The main acts which were to be consolidated were the Petroleum (Production) Act 1934 (24 & 25 Geo. 5. c. 36); the Petroleum and Submarine Pipe-lines Act 1975 (c. 74); the Oil and Gas (Enterprise) Act 1982; and the Petroleum Act 1987 (c. 12), parts I and II.

The act vested all rights to the UK’s petroleum resources in the Crown; a right first established by the Petroleum Production Act 1934 (24 & 25 Geo. 5. c. 36). It also established the right to grant licenses to ‘search and bore for and get’ petroleum, to the Oil and Gas Authority; this was through the retrospective application of the Energy Act 2016. The act also made provision for the abandonment of offshore installations and pipelines. The act also puts into statute the objective of maximising the economic recovery of the UK’s offshore oil and gas resources (by means of the Infrastructure Act 2015). The act repealed in their entirety the Petroleum Production Act 1934 (24 & 25 Geo. 5. c. 36) and the Petroleum and Submarine Pipe-lines Act 1975 (c. 74). It also amended parts I and II of the Petroleum Act 1987 (c. 12), concerning the abandonment of Offshore Installations and the licensing of petroleum production.

== Provisions ==
=== Part I Petroleum (sections 1 to 9) ===
Section 4 has further clauses on licence provisions. Section 50 of the Infrastructure Act 2015 appended this section. It defines 'associated hydraulic fracturing' as more than 1,000 cubic metres of fluid per stage, or more than 10,000 cubic metres of fluid in total. In addition, conditions were attached that mean no fracking can take place at a depth shallower than 1,000 meters, and that soil and air monitoring must be put in place. The regulations state that "The associated hydraulic fracturing will not take place within protected groundwater source areas". 'Protected groundwater source area' does not appear to be defined.

=== Part II Offshore activities ===
Section 10 applied UK criminal law to acts or omissions which takes place on, under or above an offshore installation which would constitute an offences under UK criminal law.

Section 11 applied UK civil law to acts or omissions which takes place on, under or above an offshore installation which would constitute an offences under UK civil law.

Section 12 requires in England and Wales the consent of the Director of Public Prosecutions to instigate proceedings for an offence.

Section 13 details the interpretation of Part II.

=== Part III Submarine pipelines ===
Section 14 prohibits the construction or use of any controlled pipeline without the written authorisation by the Secretary of State.

Section 15 authorisations may contain limitations or specified conditions.

Section 16 modifications to increase capacity or installation of a junction may be specified by the Secretary of State.

Section 17 a person may apply to have material conveyed by a pipeline.

Section 18 specifies why and how authorisations may be terminated.

Section 19 a pipeline which ceases to have an authorisation shall be transferred to and vested in the Secretary of State.

Section 20 the Secretary of State may appoint inspectors.

Section 21 specifies offences and enforcement.

Section 22 criminal proceedings.

Section 23 civil liability for breach of statutory duty.

Section 24 application of Part III.

Section 25 making of orders and regulations.

Sections 26 and 27 cover the meanings of pipeline and owner.

Section 28 interpretation of Part III.

=== Part IV Abandonment of offshore installations ===
Section 29 Preparation of programmes.

Section 30 Persons who may be required to submit programmes.

Section 31 Section 29 notices: supplementary provisions.

Section 32 Approval of programmes.

Section 33 Failure to submit programmes.

Section 34 Revision of programmes.

Section 35 Withdrawal of approval.

Section 36 Duty to carry out programmes.

Section 37 Default in carrying out programmes.

Section 38 Financial resources.

Section 39 Regulations.

Section 40 Offences: penalties.

Section 41 Offences: general.

Section 42 Validity of Secretary of State’s acts.

Section 43 Notices.

Section 44 Meaning of “offshore installation”.

Section 45 Interpretation of Part IV.

=== Part V Miscellaneous and General ===
Section 46 Northern Ireland and Isle of Man shares of petroleum revenue.

Section 47 Loans for development.

Section 48 Interpretation.

Section 49 Transitional provisions and savings.

Section 50 Consequential amendments.

Section 51 Repeals and revocations.

Section 52 Commencement.

Section 53 Short title and extent.

=== Repealed enactments ===
Section 51(1) of the act repealed 20 enactments, listed in part I of schedule 5 to the act, and section 51(2) revoked 6 instruments, listed in part II of that schedule.

Part I — Repeals
Citation	Short title	Extent of repeal
1934 c. 36	Petroleum (Production) Act 1934	The whole act.
1954 c. 70	Mines and Quarries Act 1954	In Schedule 4, the paragraph relating to the Petroleum (Production) Act 1934.
1964 c. 29	Continental Shelf Act 1964	In section 1, subsection (3) and, in subsection (8), the words from "and "petroleum"" to the end.
1966 c. 4	Mines (Working Facilities and Support) Act 1966	Section 15(5).
1966 c. 4	Mines (Working Facilities and Support) Act 1966	Schedule 2.
1975 c. 22	Oil Taxation Act 1975	Section 21(5).
1975 c. 74	Petroleum and Submarine Pipe-lines Act 1975	The whole act.
1976 c. 30	Fatal Accidents Act 1976	In Schedule 1, in paragraph 2(2), the reference to section 30(1) of the Petroleum and Submarine Pipe-lines Act 1975.
1978 c. 46	Employment (Continental Shelf) Act 1978	The whole act.
1982 c. 23	Oil and Gas (Enterprise) Act 1982	The whole act except sections 24, 26, 31, 37 and 38 and, in Schedule 3, paragraphs 1, 3, 4, 8 (so far as relating to sections 3 and 9 of the Mineral Workings (Offshore Installations) Act 1971), 11, 34, 37 and 39.
1984 c. 12	Telecommunications Act 1984	Section 107(3).
1985 c. 48	Food and Environment Protection Act 1985	Section 15(4)(b).
1987 c. 12	Petroleum Act 1987	Parts I and II.
1987 c. 12	Petroleum Act 1987	Section 24(4) to (6).
1987 c. 12	Petroleum Act 1987	Section 28.
1987 c. 12	Petroleum Act 1987	Section 31(2)(a).
1987 c. 12	Petroleum Act 1987	Schedules 1 and 2.
1987 c. 21	Pilotage Act 1987	In Schedule 2, paragraph 5.
1987 c. 49	Territorial Sea Act 1987	In Schedule 1, paragraph 7(1) and (2).
1992 c. 15	Offshore Safety Act 1992	In section 1, in subsection (3)(c), the words from "section" to "requirements and" and, in subsection (5), paragraph (b) and, in paragraph (c), the words "16(1) or".
1992 c. 15	Offshore Safety Act 1992	Section 3(1)(c) and (d).
1992 c. 52	Trade Union and Labour Relations (Consolidation) Act 1992	Section 287(5).
1992 c. 52	Trade Union and Labour Relations (Consolidation) Act 1992	In Schedule 2, paragraph 29.
1995 c. 7	Requirements of Writing (Scotland) Act 1995	In Schedule 4, paragraphs 48 and 50.
1995 c. 21	Merchant Shipping Act 1995	In Schedule 13, paragraph 65.
1995 c. 40	Criminal Procedure (Consequential Provisions) (Scotland) Act 1995	In Schedule 4, paragraph 40.
1996 c. 18	Employment Rights Act 1996	Section 201(5).
1996 c. 18	Employment Rights Act 1996	In Schedule 1, paragraph 18.

Part II — Revocations
Citation	Title	Extent of revocation
SI 1977/1251 (N.I. 18)	Fatal Accidents (Northern Ireland) Order 1977	In Schedule 1, paragraph 8.
SI 1992/1972 (N.I. 17)	Offshore, and Pipelines, Safety (Northern Ireland) Order 1992	In Article 3, in paragraph (3)(c), the words from "section" to "requirements and" and, in paragraph (5), sub-paragraph (b) and, in sub-paragraph (c), the words "16(1) or".
SI 1992/1972 (N.I. 17)	Offshore, and Pipelines, Safety (Northern Ireland) Order 1992	Article 5(1)(b).
SI 1993/1823	Offshore Safety (Repeals and Modifications) Regulations 1993	Regulation 4(3).
S.R. (N.I.) 1993 No. 384	Offshore Safety (Repeals and Modifications) Regulations (Northern Ireland) 1993	Regulation 4(2).
SI 1997/2703	Section 7 of the Petroleum (Production) Act 1934 and Section 2(1)(a) of the Petroleum Act 1987 (Modification) Regulations 1997	The whole instrument.
S.R. (N.I.) 1997 No. 528	Section 2(1)(a) of the Petroleum Act 1987 (Modification) Regulations (Northern Ireland) 1997	The whole instrument.

== Subsequent legislation ==
The Infrastructure Act 2015 inserted part 1A into the Petroleum Act 1998. The Energy Act 2016 extended part 1A.

PART 1A Maximising economic recovery of UK petroleum

Section 9A The principal objective and the strategy.

Section 9B Exercise of certain functions of the OGA.

Section 9BA Exercise of certain functions of the Secretary of State.

Section 9C Carrying out of certain petroleum industry activities.

Section 9D Reports by the Secretary of State.

Section 9E OGA's security and resilience functions.

Section 9F Producing and revising a strategy.

Section 9G Procedure for producing and revising a strategy.

Section 9H “Upstream petroleum infrastructure” and its owners.

Section 9HA “Relevant offshore installations” and their owners.

Section 9I Other interpretation.

== See also ==
- Energy law
- Petroleum Act
- Oil and gas industry in the United Kingdom
