= Energy Act 2016 =

Act of the Parliament of the United Kingdom

Energy Act 2016 (Note: Section 85(1).)
- Act of Parliament
- Parliament of the United Kingdom
- Long title: An Act to make provision about the Oil and Gas Authority and its functions; to make provision about rights to use upstream petroleum infrastructure; to make provision about the abandonment of offshore installations, submarine pipelines and upstream petroleum infrastructure; to extend Part 1A of the Petroleum Act 1998 to Northern Ireland; to make provision about the disclosure of information for the purposes of international agreements; to make provision about fees in respect of activities relating to oil, gas, carbon dioxide and pipelines; to make provision about wind power; and for connected purposes.
- Citation: 2016 c. 20
- Introduced by: Amber Rudd MP, Secretary of State for Energy and Climate Change (Commons); Lord Bourne of Aberystwyth (Lords)
- Territorial extent: United Kingdom (Note: Section 85(2)–(3).)

Dates
- Royal assent: 12 May 2016
- Commencement: Various (Note: Section 84.)
Other legislation
Amends	Petroleum Act 1998
Amended by	Energy Act 2023

Status: Amended

History of passage through Parliament

Text of statute as originally enacted

Revised text of statute as amended

The Energy Act 2016 (c. 20) is an act of the Parliament of the United Kingdom relating to UK enterprise law and energy in the UK. It created a new Oil and Gas Authority, meaning that a quango rather than a government minister deals with the oil and gas industry.

== Provisions ==
Sections 1-85 and Schs 1-2 concern the new Oil and Gas Authority (OGA).

- Section 2 transfers functions to the OGA, explained under Sch 1. SS can make regulations.
- Section 8, matters to which the OGA must have regard are: minimising future public expense, security of energy supply, storage of carbon dioxide, collaboration with the UK government and people doing ‘relevant activities’, innovation in technology and work practice, and ‘a stable and predictable system of regulation which encourages investment in relevant activities.’
- Section 9(1) permits the Secretary of State to give directions to OGA that ‘(a) are necessary in the interests of national security, or (b) are otherwise in the public interest’, (2) but under (b) only if exceptional.
- Section 12(1) - the OGA may charge fees — (a) for making a determination under Schedule 1 to the Oil Taxation Act 1975; (b) applications under s 12A of the Energy Act 1976; (c) s 3, 15, 16 or 17 of the Petroleum Act 1998; (d) for holder of a licence granted under s 3 (boring, getting petrol) or s 2 PPA 1934 (searching and getting) (e) on under s 15 of the Petroleum Act 1998; (f) for carrying out or attending any test, examination or inspection of a prescribed description; (g) under s 4 or 18 of the Energy Act 2008; (h) under section 4 or 18 of that Act; (i) for the storage by it of samples or information in accordance with an information and samples plan (see section 33(4) of this Act).
- Section 13, levy on licence holders
- Sections 78-81, wind power consent and renewables obligation: transferred consent powers for onshore windfarms to councils, apparently, amending EA 1989 s 36.
- Schedule 1, transfer of functions to OGA
- Schedule 2, abandonment, amending PA 1998 s 28A, 29, etc. on abandonment of oil and gas infrastructure, and Energy Act 2008 s 30 on abandonment of carbon storage installations.

== See also ==
- Energy policy of the United Kingdom
- UK enterprise law
