= NSTA =

NSTA may refer to:

- North Sea Transition Authority, a government agency in the United Kingdom
- National Science Teaching Association, a professional organization in the United States
