= Infrastructure Act 2015 =

Act of the Parliament of the United Kingdom

Infrastructure Act 2015 (Note: Section 58.)
- Act of Parliament
- Parliament of the United Kingdom
- Long title: An Act to make provision for strategic highways companies and the funding of transport services by land; to make provision for the control of invasive non-native species; to make provision about nationally significant infrastructure projects; to make provision about town and country planning; to make provision about the Homes and Communities Agency and Mayoral development corporations; to make provision about the Greater London Authority so far as it exercises functions for the purposes of housing and regeneration; to make provision about Her Majesty’s Land Registry and local land charges; to make provision to enable building regulations to provide for off-site carbon abatement measures; to make provision for giving members of communities the right to buy stakes in local renewable electricity generation facilities; to make provision about maximising economic recovery of petroleum in the United Kingdom; to provide for a levy to be charged on holders of certain energy licences; to enable Her Majesty’s Revenue and Customs to exercise functions in connection with the Extractive Industries Transparency Initiative; to make provision about onshore petroleum and geothermal energy; to make provision about renewable heat incentives; to make provision about the reimbursement of persons who have paid for electricity connections; to make provision to enable the Public Works Loan Commissioners to be abolished; and for connected purposes.
- Citation: 2015 c. 7
- Introduced by: Patrick McLoughlin MP, Secretary of State for Transport (Commons); Baroness Kramer (Lords)
- Territorial extent: England and Wales; Scotland (in part); Northern Ireland (in part); (Note: Section 56.)

Dates
- Royal assent: 12 February 2015
- Commencement: Various (Note: Section 57.)
Other legislation
Amends	Law of Property Act 1925; Requisitioned Land and War Works Act 1948; Cheshire County Council Act 1953; Land Powers (Defence) Act 1958; Rights of Light Act 1959; Leasehold Reform Act 1967; Land Compensation Act 1973; Local Land Charges Act 1975; Interpretation Act 1978; Highways Act 1980; Disused Burial Grounds (Amendment) Act 1981; Compulsory Purchase (Vesting Declarations) Act 1981; Wildlife and Countryside Act 1981; Road Traffic Regulation Act 1984; Building Act 1984; Transport Act 1985; Dartford-Thurrock Crossing Act 1988; Road Traffic Act 1988; Electricity Act 1989; Town and Country Planning Act 1990; Environmental Protection Act 1990; New Roads and Street Works Act 1991; Leasehold Reform, Housing and Urban Development Act 1993; Local Government (Wales) Act 1994; Petroleum Act 1998; Greater London Authority Act 1999; Utilities Act 2000; Freedom of Information Act 2000; Transport Act 2000; Anti-terrorism, Crime and Security Act 2001; Land Registration Act 2002; Railways and Transport Safety Act 2003; Traffic Management Act 2004; Civil Contingencies Act 2004; Constitutional Reform Act 2005; Commissioners for Revenue and Customs Act 2005; Housing and Regeneration Act 2008; Planning Act 2008Energy Act 2008; Localism Act 2011; Public Bodies Act 2011
Amended by	Deregulation Act 2015; Office of Rail Regulation (Change of Name) Regulations 2015; Energy Act 2016; Housing and Planning Act 2016; Wales Act 2017; Infrastructure (Wales) Act 2024; Planning and Infrastructure Act 2025

Status: Amended

History of passage through Parliament

Text of statute as originally enacted

Revised text of statute as amended

The Infrastructure Act 2015 (c. 7) is an act of the Parliament of the United Kingdom. The act is wide-ranging piece of planning and infrastructure legislation passed during David Cameron's administration. The act targets "transport, energy provision, housing development and nationally significant infrastructure projects", and has been the subject of some degree of controversy.

== Environmental issues ==
The Infrastructure Act 2015 seeks to include safeguards around hydraulic fracturing. Opponents to hydraulic fracturing claim that the definition of hydraulic fracturing used by the bill is too exclusive based on existing hydraulic fracturing operations. Specifically, it is claimed that the requirement for ten thousand cubic metres of fluid total or one thousand cubic metres of fluid per stage or expected stage is too high, and that it is a greater amount of fluid than the amount used at the Preese Hall shale well.

Preese Hall is a particularly sensitive point of comparison for political opponents of hydraulic fracturing, as the minor earthquakes around the Preese Hall shale well were widely reported. Other areas of the Infrastructure Act 2015 closely related to environmental issues include sections on Renewable Heat Incentives, off-site carbon abatement measures and cycling and walking investment strategies, making environmental issues a significant focus of the Act.

== Development ==
The Infrastructure Act 2015 is especially relevant to development and planning law around development. An explicit aim of the legislation was to increase housing development within Britain, which became an increasingly important political issue in the beginning of the twenty-first century. In addition to housing, key UK development and planning issues were addressed within the Act by efforts "to make provision about nationally significant infrastructure projects...to make provision about town and country planning...to make provision about the Homes and Communities Agency and Mayoral development corporations...to make provision for giving members of communities the right to buy stakes in local renewable electricity generation facilities".

== Provisions ==
=== Part 6 Energy ===
==== Recovery of UK petroleum (sections 41 and 42) ====
Clauses on maximizing economic recovery of UK petroleum.

==== Petroleum and geothermal energy in deep-level land (sections 43 to 48) ====
Section 43 permits fracking without consent under 'landward areas' in England and Wales, below a surface level of 300 meters. The legislation is limited to the petroleum and geothermal industries.

==== Other provision about onshore petroleum (sections 49 and 50) ====
Clauses on meeting climate change requirements. Section 50 appends section 4 of the Petroleum Act 1998. It defines 'associated hydraulic fracturing' as more than 1,000 cubic metres of fluid per stage, or more than 10,000 cubic metres of fluid in total. In addition, conditions were attached that mean no fracking can take place at a depth shallower than 1,000 meters, and that soil and air monitoring must be put in place. The regulations state that "The associated hydraulic fracturing will not take place within protected groundwater source areas". 'Groundwater protection source area' does not appear to be defined.

== See also ==
- Hydraulic fracturing in the United Kingdom
