= Petroleum Act 1987 =

Act of the Parliament of the United Kingdom

Petroleum Act 1987 (Note: Section 32(1).)
- Act of Parliament
- Parliament of the United Kingdom
- Long title: An Act to make provision in respect of the abandonment of onshore installations and submarine pipe-lines and in respect of safety zones around offshore installations; to amend the Petroleum (Production) Act 1934 and to make provision in respect of licences under that Act; to amend the law relating to pipe-lines; to repeal sections 34 to 39 of the Petroleum and Submarine Pipe-lines Act 1975; and for connected purposes.
- Citation: 1987 c. 12
- Introduced by: Viscount Davidson (second reading) (Lords)
- Territorial extent: England and Wales; Scotland; Northern Ireland (except sections 25–27); (Note: Section 32(2).)

Dates
- Royal assent: 9 April 1987
- Commencement: various (Note: Section 31.)

Other legislation
- Amends: Petroleum (Production) Act 1934; Continental Shelf Act 1964
- Amended by: Petroleum Act 1998

Status: Amended

Text of statute as originally enacted

Revised text of statute as amended

Text of the Petroleum Act 1987 as in force today (including any amendments) within the United Kingdom, from legislation.gov.uk.

The Petroleum Act 1987 (c. 12) is an act of the Parliament of the United Kingdom which updates the arrangements for regulating offshore installations and their operation. In particular it makes provisions for the licensing and the safe and orderly abandonment of installations and submarine pipelines.

== Background ==
The cost of totally removing all existing offshore installations on the UK continental shelf was estimated, in 1984, to be £6 billion (1984 prices). The government hoped that costs could be saved by allowing the partial, rather than the total, removal of installations. It was necessary that an appropriate framework should be in place to set standards for the removal operations. Apart from the interests of oil companies there were those of fishermen and mariners, the UK's obligations under international law and the interests of the taxpayer. The responsibility for removal rested with the owners of an installation or pipeline. There should be criminal offences for failure to comply with obligations. The government gave the Secretary of State enabling powers to make regulations concerning detailed standards for abandonment.

In addition to an abandonment regime it was necessary to update the royalty regime by rationalising the procedures for royalty accounting and arbitration and the provisions for the measurement of petroleum. Furthermore, enabling powers were needed to allow repayment of royalties to make allowance for abandonment costs. The UK offshore licensing regime needed to be extended to the territorial waters of Northern Ireland.

In 1987 each safety zone round an installation had to be established by statutory instrument. Legislation was necessary to provide for the automatic creation of a 500 metre safety zones around offshore installations. Updated legislation for onshore pipelines was required, especially provisions for insurance arrangements; the Secretary of State was empowered to prohibit the use or testing of any pipeline unless funds were available to discharge any liability for loss or damage.

== Provisions ==
The act received royal assent on 9 April 1987. Its long title is: ‘An Act to make provision in respect of the abandonment of onshore installations and submarine pipe-lines and in respect of safety zones around offshore installations; to amend the Petroleum (Production) Act 1934 and to make provision in respect of licences under that Act; to amend the law relating to pipe-lines; to repeal sections 34 to 39 of the Petroleum and Submarine Pipe-lines Act 1975; and for connected purposes.’

The act comprises 32 Sections in 4 Parts and 3 Schedules:

- PART I Abandonment of Offshore Installations
  - Sections 1 to 16 – Programmes for abandonment, appropriate persons to submit programmes, notices, approvals, failure to submit programmes, revision of programmes, withdrawal of approval, duty to carry out programmes, default in carrying out programmes, financial resources, making regulations, offences, the powers of the Secretary of State, notices.
- PART II Licensing
  - Sections 17 to 20 – existing licences, future licences, extension to Northern Ireland territorial waters, annual reports.
- PART III Miscellaneous
  - Safety zones – Sections 21 to 24 – automatic establishment of safety zones, establishment by order, safety zone offences.
  - Pipe-lines – Sections 25 to 27 – construction authorisations, funds, compulsory acquisition of rights.
  - Refineries – Section 28 – construction of refineries (repealing existing legislation).
- PART IV Supplementary
  - Sections 29 to 32 – expenses, repeals, commencement, short title and extent.
- SCHEDULES
  - Schedule 1– Amendment of Existing Licences
  - Schedule 2 – Amendment of Model Clauses
  - Schedule 3 – Repeals

== Effects ==
The act provided a framework for the abandonment of offshore installations on the UK continental shelf.

The first decommissioning approval was given in 1988 for the abandonment, by toppling, of the remains of the Piper Alpha platform. The first decommissioning approval for a floating production facility (FPF) was given in 1991 for the Crawford FPF. The first fixed steel platform to be entirely removed to shore was the Forbes AW platform in 1993.

== Later enactments ==
Parts I and II of the act were repealed on 15 February 1999 by the Petroleum Act 1998.

Part III section 28 (construction of refineries) was repealed on 15 February 1999 by the Petroleum Act 1998.

== See also ==
- Oil and gas industry in the United Kingdom
- North Sea Oil
- Petroleum Act
