= Petroleum Revenue Tax Act 1980 =

Petroleum Revenue Act 1980
- Act of Parliament
- Parliament of the United Kingdom
- Long title: An Act to make new provision in respect of petroleum revenue tax so as to require payments on account of tax to be made in advance of the making of an assessment, to bring forward the date from which interest is payable on unpaid and overpaid tax and to provide for altering the rate at which such interest is payable.
- Citation: 1980 c. 1
- Introduced by: Peter Rees, Treasury Minister of State, 10 December 1979 (Second Reading) (Commons)
- Territorial extent: United Kingdom

Dates
- Royal assent: 31 January 1980
- Commencement: 31 January 1980

Other legislation
- Amends: Oil Taxation Act 1975

Status: Amended

The Petroleum Revenue Tax Act 1980 (c. 1) is a UK act of Parliament associated with UK enterprise law that made new provisions for petroleum revenue tax (introduced by the Oil Taxation Act 1975). The act required that payments on account of tax should be made in advance of an assessment, and that interest payable on tax was brought forward.

== Background ==
In introducing the Petroleum Revenue Tax Bill to Parliament in December 1979, the Treasury Minister of State, Peter Rees, admitted that the Bill was partly a response to the Government’s critical cash flow problem, caused by industrial action. The Bill was designed to advance the payments of petroleum revenue tax (PRT). It was estimated that the provisions would bring £700 million forward from 1980–81 into the financial year 1979–80. In addition, £300 million would be brought forward into 1980–81. It would also bring the regime for payment of PRT into line with that for the payment of royalties on North Sea oil revenues.

== Petroleum Revenue Tax Act 1980 ==
The Petroleum Revenue Tax Act 1980 (c. 1) received royal assent on 31 January 1980. Its long title is "An Act to make new provision in respect of petroleum revenue tax so as to require payments on account of tax to be made in advance of the making of an assessment, to bring forward the date from which interest is payable on unpaid and overpaid tax and to provide for altering the rate at which such interest is payable".

=== Provisions ===
The act comprises three sections and a schedule

- Section 1 – Payments on account of tax.
- Section 2 – Interest on tax and on repayments.
- Section 3 – Short title, construction and commencement.
- Schedule – Computation of Payment on Account

== Other legislation ==
Subsequent legislation that has amended the 1980 Act includes:

- Oil Taxation Act 1983 (1983 c. 56)
- Petroleum Royalties (Relief) Act 1983 (1983 c. 59)
- Advance Petroleum Revenue Tax Act 1986 (1986 c. 68)
- Petroleum Royalties (Relief) and Continental Shelf Act 1989 (1989 c. 1)

== See also ==
- Petroleum Revenue Tax
- UK enterprise law
- Corporation Tax Act 2010 ss 272-279A on remaining oil and gas taxes
- Petroleum Act
- Oil and gas industry in the United Kingdom
