= Petroleum Revenue Tax =

Direct tax on petroleum "super-profits" in the United Kingdom

Petroleum Revenue Tax (PRT) is a direct tax collected in the United Kingdom. It was introduced under the Oil Taxation Act 1975, soon after Harold Wilson's Labour government returned to power and in the immediate aftermath of the 1973 energy crisis, and was intended to ensure "fairer share of profits for the nation" from the exploitation of the UK's continental shelf, while ensuring a "suitable return" on the capital investment by oil companies.

== Petroleum Revenue Tax ==
PRT is charged on "super-profits" arising from the exploitation of oil and gas in the UK and the UK's continental shelf. After certain allowances, PRT is charged at a rate of 50% (falling to 35% from 1 Jan 2016 and was effectively abolished in the March 2016 budget) on profits from oil extraction. PRT is charged by reference to individual oil and gas fields, so the costs related to developing and running one field cannot be set off against the profits generated by another field. PRT was abolished on 16 March 1993 for all fields given development consent on or after that date, but continues in existence for fields established before that date. At the same time, the rate of PRT was reduced from 75% to 50%, but various reliefs from PRT for expenditure on exploration and appraisal were withdrawn.

PRT is charged in addition to corporation tax, which is also payable by companies involved in oil exploration and production, although PRT is deductible in calculating profits for corporation tax purposes. Profits from oil extraction activities are subject to a corporation tax "ring fence", which means that profits from these activities cannot be reduced by any losses or other tax reliefs from other business activities (the corporation tax ring fence fences off the whole oil exploration trade, not individual fields like PRT). Profits within the corporation tax "ring fence" have been subject to a supplementary corporation tax charge of 10% in addition to the usual 30% rate since 17 April 2002. This supplementary charge was increased to 20% in the Pre-Budget Report of December 2005, with effect from 1 January 2006, and was further increased in the 2011 budget to 32%, with effect from 23 March 2011. This means that the marginal tax rate on PRT paying fields is now 81% (fields not paying PRT pay a rate of 62%).

PRT is administered by the Energy Group of the Large Business Service of HM Revenue and Customs (formerly the Oil Taxation Office of Inland Revenue). This group also administers the "ring fence" corporation tax and supplementary charge paid by companies on profits from oil and gas production, and previously administered the royalty charged on the gross value of oil and gas won.

== United Kingdom legislation ==
United Kingdom primary legislation that has introduced and amended Petroleum Revenue Tax includes:

- Oil Taxation Act 1975 (c. 22)
- Petroleum Revenue Tax Act 1980 (c. 1)
- Oil Taxation Act 1983 (c. 56)
- Petroleum Royalties (Relief) Act 1983 (c. 59)
- Advance Petroleum Revenue Tax Act 1986 (c. 68)
- Petroleum Royalties (Relief) and Continental Shelf Act 1989 (c. 1)

== See also ==
- Minerals Resource Rent Tax (2012), a tax on profits generated from the mining of non-renewable resources in Australia
