= National Energy System Operator =

Government-owned energy system operator for Great Britain

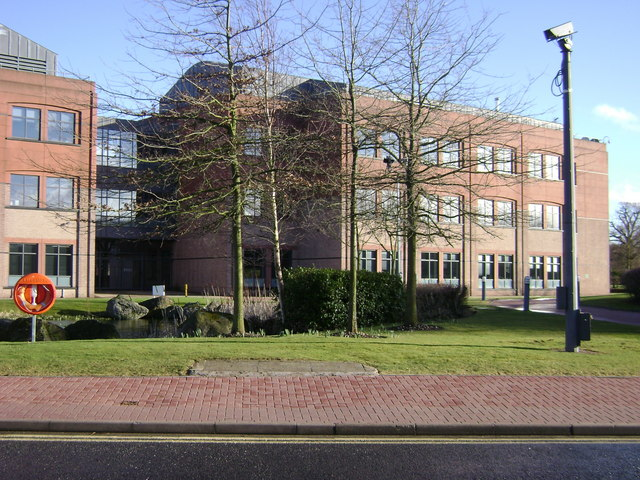
- National Grid offices at Warwick Technology Park in Warwickshire
- Type: State-owned private company limited by shares
- Predecessor: National Grid Electricity System Operator
- Founded: October 1, 2024; 2 years ago
- Headquarters: Warwick, England, UK
- Key people: Dr Paul Golby (chair); Fintan Slye (chief executive)
- Owner: HM Government (Department for Energy Security and Net Zero)
- Website: Official website

The National Energy System Operator (NESO) is a government-owned energy system operator for Great Britain, based in Warwick, England. It is designated as the Independent System Operator and Planner (ISOP) under the Energy Act 2023. NESO is the licensed electricity system operator and balances supply and demand in real time. It has strategic planning roles for electricity networks, and planning and forecasting roles for gas transmission systems.

NESO began operating on 1 October 2024 after the UK government acquired the electricity system operator division of National Grid plc for £630 million. As of December 2025, the chair is Dr Paul Golby and the chief executive is Fintan Slye.

== Background ==
The electricity system operator function in Great Britain was historically performed within the National Grid group. In July 2021, the UK government and Ofgem consulted on proposals to create a new, impartial Future System Operator to support decarbonisation while maintaining security of supply and minimising costs for consumers. The consultation proposed that the new body should take on the main existing electricity system operator roles and should also have longer-term strategic planning and forecasting roles in gas.

Further policy consultation in 2023 described the Future System Operator as intended to be established in public ownership, with operational independence from day-to-day government control, and as a trusted body at the centre of the gas and electricity systems. In March 2024, the Department for Energy Security and Net Zero and Ofgem published a statutory consultation on licences and other regulatory changes for the National Energy System Operator. The consultation covered proposed electricity system operator and gas system planner licences and related changes to implement the new arrangements.

== Establishment ==
The Energy Act 2023 created a statutory framework for an Independent System Operator and Planner (ISOP) and gave the Secretary of State powers to designate a body to carry out those functions. The framework also provided for new regulatory arrangements, including licences connected to electricity system operation and energy system planning roles.

On 13 September 2024, the Department for Energy Security and Net Zero and Ofgem published a decision notice setting out final decisions to establish NESO and transfer the electricity system operator function into public ownership. The notice provided for the designation of NESO as the ISOP, the granting of a new Gas System Planner licence to NESO, and the replacement of National Grid Electricity System Operator's existing arrangements with a new Electricity System Operator licence. These measures came into effect at midnight on 1 October 2024.

== Functions and duties ==
NESO carries out electricity system operator functions in Great Britain, and has energy system planning and forecasting roles under legislation and Ofgem licences.

=== Electricity system operation ===
As the licensed electricity system operator, NESO balances the electricity system in real time so that supply meets demand.

==== Operational context ====
Balancing involves managing short-term changes in demand and generation, and taking actions to keep the system operating within required limits, including maintaining system frequency and securing enough flexibility and contingency reserves to respond to unexpected events. In practice, this includes coordinating with generators, storage operators, interconnectors and network companies, and using market and contractual mechanisms to procure and dispatch balancing services.

NESO operates the system but does not own the electricity transmission networks, which are owned and run by separate network companies.

=== Energy system planning and forecasting ===
NESO has strategic planning roles for the future development of electricity networks, including planning and coordinating network design to meet future electricity infrastructure needs. It carries out planning and forecasting roles for gas transmission systems, rather than operating the gas system day to day.

=== Statutory objectives and advisory role ===
In carrying out its functions, NESO must act in the way it considers best promotes statutory objectives that include the net zero objective, security of supply and efficiency and economy. It may also provide advice, analysis or information to ministers and Ofgem on its functions, and it keeps under review developments in the energy sector relevant to those functions.

== Activities and publications ==
In October 2024, the UK, Scottish and Welsh governments commissioned NESO to produce a Strategic Spatial Energy Plan (SSEP) for Great Britain, intended to provide a high-level spatial plan for energy infrastructure and to inform later network planning. In December 2025, government correspondence extended the SSEP timeline to incorporate updated cost and demand data into modelling.

NESO produces long-term network planning outputs. Its Centralised Strategic Network Plan (CSNP) sets out planned future electricity transmission infrastructure needs in Great Britain. Ofgem guidance describes the CSNP as an independent, coordinated and long-term approach to planning transmission networks across Great Britain, including electricity and gas transmission and hydrogen transport and storage networks.

In December 2025, NESO announced reforms to the electricity grid connection process intended to prioritise more viable generation and storage projects and remove stalled projects from the queue, which Reuters called "zombie" projects.

On 20 May 2026, NESO announced that continental intraday changes to planned power trades on UK's 7.5 GW of continental interconnectors would be limited to 1.5 GW, or 300 GW per interconnector, until the end of the year. This was because the UK's practice of reversing trades already booked the day before to accommodate balancing was unduly impacting European markets. Post-Brexit changes to trading rules meant the UK was less closely coordinated with others on the continent, and new longer term solutions needed to be agreed.

=== Timeline ===
In September and October 2024, the UK government completed the legal and regulatory steps to establish NESO and then commissioned it to produce the SSEP as a major planning output. In November 2025, Ofgem issued guidance on the CSNP and its scope in long-term energy network planning. In December 2025, NESO announced changes to the grid connections process and the government extended the SSEP timeline.

== Governance and organisation ==
NESO is a private company limited by shares that is wholly owned by the Secretary of State. A framework document published by the Department for Energy Security and Net Zero says NESO is operationally independent in how it manages and organises itself to deliver its functions, with the NESO board retaining operational control of the organisation.

The framework document sets out an accountability arrangement in which the Secretary of State acts as shareholder and policy sponsor, supported by UK Government Investments as shareholder representative. Ofgem regulates NESO's performance and compliance with its statutory duties and licence obligations, and approves NESO's regulatory business plan.

The framework document notes that HM Treasury had given NESO an indicative classification as a public non-financial corporation, pending confirmation by the Office for National Statistics.

As of December 2025, the chair is Dr Paul Golby and the chief executive is Fintan Slye. NESO is funded through regulated network charges rather than direct day-to-day government budget allocation, although the framework document provides for government financial assistance in specified circumstances, including a working capital loan facility.

== Regulation and oversight ==
Ofgem regulates NESO through statutory duties and licence conditions, including an Electricity System Operator licence and a Gas System Planner licence. The licensing arrangements were developed through statutory consultation and came into effect when NESO began operating on 1 October 2024.

Ofgem monitors NESO's compliance with its statutory duties and licence obligations and can amend licence requirements following consultation where appropriate. Ofgem also approves NESO's regulatory business plan and receives information needed for regulatory monitoring and reporting.

== Relationship with other UK energy bodies ==
NESO was created by bringing the former electricity system operator business from the National Grid group into public ownership and separating it from National Grid plc. The Department for Energy Security and Net Zero acts as NESO's policy sponsor and shareholder, while UK Government Investments acts as the shareholder representative on behalf of the Secretary of State.

In carrying out electricity system operator functions, NESO coordinates with electricity transmission owners and distribution network operators, including exchanging information to understand system-wide impacts of operational decisions and to promote the efficient use of resources. NESO interacts with generators, suppliers, interconnector operators and other market participants as part of balancing and system operation arrangements.

== Reception and commentary ==
In April 2024, the House of Commons' Energy Security and Net Zero Committee held a pre-appointment hearing for the proposed NESO chair.

Reuters and The Guardian reported on the government's purchase of National Grid's electricity system operator business as part of bringing the system operator into public ownership and separating it from National Grid. Reuters also reported on NESO's launch in October 2024 and on later changes to the electricity grid connections process in December 2025.

An Institute for Government explainer described NESO as an independent public body that combines real-time system operation with strategic planning roles to support net zero objectives.

== See also ==
- National Transmission System, the gas network operated by National Gas
- High-voltage direct current
- Submarine power cable
