= Energy Act 2023 =

Act of the Parliament of the United Kingdom

Energy Act 2023 (Note: Section 335.)
- Act of Parliament
- Parliament of the United Kingdom
- Long title: An Act to make provision about energy production and security and the regulation of the energy market, including provision about the licensing of carbon dioxide transport and storage; about commercial arrangements for carbon capture and storage and for hydrogen production and transportation; about new technology, including low-carbon heat schemes and hydrogen grid trials; about the Independent System Operator and Planner; about gas and electricity industry codes; about financial support for persons carrying on energy-intensive activities; about heat networks; about energy smart appliances and load control; about the energy performance of premises; about energy savings opportunity schemes; about the resilience of the core fuel sector; about offshore energy production, including environmental protection, licensing and decommissioning; about the civil nuclear sector, including the Civil Nuclear Constabulary and pensions; and for connected purposes.
- Citation: 2023 c. 52
- Introduced by: Grant Shapps, Secretary of State for Energy Security and Net Zero (Commons); The Lord Callanan, Parliamentary Under-Secretary of State for Energy Efficiency and Green Finance (Lords)
- Territorial extent: England and Wales; Scotland; Northern Ireland; (Note: Section 333.)

Dates
- Royal assent: 26 October 2023
- Commencement: Various (Note: Section 334.)
Other legislation
Amends	Nuclear Installations Act 1965; Gas Act 1986; Electricity Act 1989; Petroleum Act 1998; Utilities Act 2000; Enterprise Act 2002; Energy Act 2004; Counter-Terrorism Act 2008; Energy Act 2008
Amended by	Digital Markets, Competition and Consumers Act 2024; Planning and Infrastructure Act 2025

Status: Amended

History of passage through Parliament

Text of statute as originally enacted

Revised text of statute as amended

The Energy Act 2023 (c. 52) is an act of the Parliament of the United Kingdom

The act's aim is for the security and independence of energy supply in the United Kingdom using different methods, including nuclear, oil, gas, hydro and wind. In turn, it is hoped that people's energy bills will decrease after this.

The act received royal assent on 26 October 2023.

== Contents ==
The Energy Act 2023 contains 14 main parts.

- Part 1 Licensing of carbon dioxide transport and storage
- Part 2 Carbon dioxide capture, storage etc and hydrogen production, transport and storage
- Part 3 Licensing of hydrogen pipeline projects
- Part 4 New technology
- Part 5 Independent System Operator and Planner
- Part 6 Governance of gas and electricity industry codes
- Part 7 Market reform and consumer protection
- Part 8 Heat networks
- Part 9 Energy smart appliances and load control
- Part 10 Energy performance of premises
- Part 11 Energy Savings Opportunity Schemes
- Part 12 Core fuel sector resilience
- Part 13 Offshore wind electricity generation, oil and gas
- Part 14 Civil nuclear sector

The act established the National Energy System Operator (NESO).

== Parliamentary passage ==
The bill for the act was introduced in the House of Lords on 6 July 2022 by Lord Callanan, piloted through the House of Commons by Grant Shapps, and had its third reading in the House of Commons on 5 September 2023. The act was considerably amended through both Houses of Parliament, and is one of the largest pieces of energy legislation to ever be created.

During the passage of the bill, conflicting amendments were tabled by different groups of Conservative MPs.

== Implementation ==
The name of the Independent System Operator and Planner was later announced to be the National Energy System Operator (Neso), to be operational on the 1 October 2024.
