= Oil Taxation Act 1975 =

Act of the Parliament of the United Kingdom

Oil Taxation Act 1975 (Note: Section 21(1).)
- Act of Parliament
- Parliament of the United Kingdom
- Long title: An Act to impose a new tax in respect of profits from substances won or capable of being won under the authority of licences granted under the Petroleum (Production) Act 1934 or the Petroleum (Production) Act (Northern Ireland) 1964; to make in the law relating to income tax and corporation tax amendments connected with such substances or with petroleum companies; and for connected purposes.
- Citation: 1975 c. 22
- Introduced by: The Paymaster-General, Edmund Dell. 27 November 1974 (Second Reading) (Commons)
- Territorial extent: United Kingdom

Dates
- Royal assent: 8 May 1975
- Commencement: 8 May 1975 (Note: The Acts of Parliament (Commencement) Act 1793.)
Other legislation
Amends	Provisional Collection of Taxes Act 1968
Amended by	Income and Corporation Taxes Act 1988; Petroleum Act 1998; Finance Act 2015; Scotland Act 2016; Wales Act 2017

Status: Amended

Text of statute as originally enacted

Revised text of statute as amended

Text of the Oil Taxation Act 1975 as in force today (including any amendments) within the United Kingdom, from legislation.gov.uk.

The Oil Taxation Act 1975 (c. 22) is an act of the Parliament of the United Kingdom relevant for UK enterprise law that was intended to ensure that oil and gas extraction companies operating in British territories and waters paid their fair share of tax. Over many years of amendments it was largely eliminated over 2015 and 2016, as the Petroleum Revenue Tax was cut to zero.

The act received royal assent on 8 May 1975. Its long title is ‘An Act to impose a new tax in respect of profits from substances won or capable of being won under the authority of licences granted under the Petroleum (Production) Act 1934 or the Petroleum (Production) Act (Northern Ireland) 1964; to make in the law relating to income tax and corporation tax amendments connected with such substances or with petroleum companies; and for connected purposes’.

== Contents ==
The Act comprises 21 sections in 3 parts and 9 schedules

- PART I Petroleum Revenue Tax
  - Section 1 Petroleum revenue tax. Previously 50% now 0% Petroleum Revenue Tax.
  - Section 2 Assessable profits and allowable losses
  - Section 3 Allowance of expenditure (other than expenditure on long-term assets and abortive exploration expenditure)
  - Section 4 Allowance of expenditure on long-term assets
  - Section 5 Allowance of abortive exploration expenditure
  - Section 6 Allowance of unrelievable loss from abandoned field
  - Section 7 Relief for allowable losses
  - Section 8 Oil allowance
  - Section 9 Annual limit on amount of tax payable by participator
  - Section 10 Modification of Part I in connection with certain gas sold to British Gas Corporation
  - Section 11 Application of Provisional Collection of Taxes Act 1968
  - Section 12 Interpretation of Part I
- PART II Provisions Relating to the Extraction of Petroleum in the United Kingdom or a Designated Area
  - Section 13 Treatment of oil extraction activities etc. for purposes of income tax and corporation tax. Ring fence corporation tax, if ‘any oil extraction activities’ are undertaken or any ‘acquisition, enjoyment or exploitation of oil rights’ done, they are to be treated as a ‘separate trade, distinct from other activities’ carried out by the company.
  - Section 14 Valuation of oil disposed of or appropriated in certain circumstances
  - Section 15 Oil extraction activities etc.: charges on income
  - Section 16 Oil extraction activities etc.: restriction on setting advance corporation tax against income therefrom
  - Section 17 Corporation tax: deduction of petroleum revenue tax in computing income
  - Section 18 Interest on tax overpaid to be disregarded in computing income
  - Section 19 Interpretation of Part II. Downstream activities (e.g. refining) or those outside the UK are not in the scope of the ring fence.
- PART III Miscellaneous and General
  - Section 20 Modification of certain provisions in relation to petroleum companies
  - Section 21 Citation, interpretation and construction
- SCHEDULES
  - SCHEDULE 1 Determination of Oil Fields
  - SCHEDULE 2 Management and Collection of Petroleum Revenue Tax
  - SCHEDULE 3 Petroleum Revenue tax : Miscellaneous Provisions
  - SCHEDULE 4 Provisions Supplementary to Sections 3 and 4
  - SCHEDULE 5 Allowance of Expenditure (other than Abortive Exploration Expenditure)
  - SCHEDULE 6 Allowance of Expenditure (other than Abortive Exploration Expenditure) on Claim by Participator
  - SCHEDULE 7 Allowance of Abortive Exploration Expenditure
  - SCHEDULE 8 Allowance of Unrelievable Field Loss
  - SCHEDULE 9 Extension of Section 485 of Taxes Act in Relation to Petroleum Companies

== Other legislation ==
Subsequent legislation that has amended the 1975 act includes:

- Petroleum Revenue Tax Act 1980 (1980 c. 1)
- Oil Taxation Act 1983 (1983 c. 56)
- Petroleum Royalties (Relief) Act 1983 (1983 c. 59)
- Advance Petroleum Revenue Tax Act 1986 (1986 c. 68)
- Petroleum Royalties (Relief) and Continental Shelf Act 1989 (1989 c. 1)

== See also ==
- Petroleum Revenue Tax
- UK enterprise law
- UK energy law
- Corporation Tax Act 2010 ss 272-279A on remaining oil and gas taxes
