= Energy Act 2008 =

Act of the Parliament of the United Kingdom

Energy Act 2008 (Note: Section 113.)
- Act of Parliament
- Parliament of the United Kingdom
- Long title: An Act to make provision relating to gas importation and storage; to make provision in relation to electricity generated from renewable sources; to make provision relating to electricity transmission; to make provision about payments to small-scale generators of low-carbon electricity; to make provision about the decommissioning of energy installations and wells; to make provision about the management and disposal of waste produced during the operation of nuclear installations; to make provision relating to petroleum licences; to make provision about third party access to oil and gas infrastructure and modifications of pipelines; to make provision about reports relating to energy matters; to make provision about the duties of the Gas and Electricity Markets Authority; to make provision about payments in respect of the renewable generation of heat; to make provision relating to gas meters and electricity meters and provision relating to electricity safety; to make provision about the security of equipment, software and information relating to nuclear matters; and for connected purposes.
- Citation: 2008 c. 32
- Introduced by: John Hutton, Secretary of State for Business, Enterprise and Regulatory Reform (Commons)
- Territorial extent: England and Wales; Scotland; Northern Ireland; (Note: Section 112.)

Dates
- Royal assent: 26 November 2008
- Commencement: Various (Note: Section 110.)
Other legislation
Amends	Petroleum Act 1998; Anti-terrorism, Crime and Security Act 2001
Amended by	Infrastructure Act 2015; Energy Act 2023

Status: Amended

History of passage through Parliament

Text of statute as originally enacted

Revised text of statute as amended

The Energy Act 2008 (c. 32) is an act of the Parliament of the United Kingdom.

== Provisions ==
The act made protecting consumers the primary responsibility of Ofgem.

The act requires that operators of nuclear power stations must accumulate funds to provide for the decommissioning of their facilities, the management of their waste and the disposal of their waste.

The act created the Renewable Heat Incentive Scheme.

== Section 110 - Commencement ==
Orders made under section 110(2)

- The Energy Act 2008 (Commencement No. 1 and Savings) Order 2009 (SI 2009/45 (C.4))
- The Energy Act 2008 (Commencement No. 2) Order 2009 (SI 2009/559 (C.38))
- The Energy Act 2008 (Commencement No. 3) Order 2009 (SI 2009/1270 (C.68))
- The Energy Act 2008 (Commencement No. 4 and Transitional Provisions) Order 2009 (SI 2009/2809 (C.123))
- The Energy Act 2008 (Commencement No. 5) Order 2010 (SI 2009/1888 (C.97))
