= List of acts of the Parliament of the United Kingdom from 1987 =

This is a list of acts of the Parliament of the United Kingdom passed in 1987.

Acts passed since 1963 are cited by calendar year, as opposed to the convention used for earlier acts of citing the regnal year(s) in which the relevant parliamentary session was held. Each act passed in a respective year is given a chapter number (abbreviated "c."), denoted by Arabic numerals in the case of public general acts, lowercase Roman numerals in the case of local acts, or italicised Arabic numerals in the case of personal acts. These run as separate series.

88 acts of Parliament were passed in 1987: 57 public general acts, 29 local acts and 2 personal acts.

indicates that an act has been transcribed on Wikisource, indicates that an act is available to view at legislation.gov.uk, and indicates the location of the original act in the Parliamentary Archives.

== Public general acts ==
Short title	Citation	Royal assent
Long title
Teachers' Pay and Conditions Act 1987 (repealed)	1987 c. 1	2 March 1987
An Act to repeal the Remuneration of Teachers Act 1965; (Note: Remuneration of Teachers Act 1965 (c. 3)) to make temporary provision with respect to the remuneration and other conditions of employment of school teachers and as to certain arrangements for settling the remuneration and other conditions of employment of teachers in further education; and for connected purposes. (Repealed by School Teachers’ Pay and Conditions Act 1991 (c. 49))
Licensing (Restaurant Meals) Act 1987	1987 c. 2	2 March 1987
An Act to relax the day-time restrictions concerning the hours during which intoxicating liquor may be served with meals in restaurants; and for connected purposes.
Coal Industry Act 1987	1987 c. 3	5 March 1987
An Act to change the name of the National Coal Board to the British Coal Corporation; to make new provision with respect to grants by the Secretary of State to the Corporation; to make provision for securing further participation by organisations representing employees in the coal industry in the management of trusts and other bodies connected with that industry and in the management of superannuation schemes for such employees; and for other purposes connected therewith.
Ministry of Defence Police Act 1987	1987 c. 4	5 March 1987
An Act to make fresh provision for the Ministry of Defence Police.
Rate Support Grants Act 1987 (repealed)	1987 c. 5	12 March 1987
An Act to make further provision as to the calculation of entitlement to block grant under Part VI of the Local Government, Planning and Land Act 1980. (Note: Local Government, Planning and Land Act 1980 (c. 65)) (Repealed by Statute Law (Repeals) Act 2004 (c. 14))
Local Government Finance Act 1987 (repealed)	1987 c. 6	12 March 1987
An Act to validate things done by the Secretary of State in connection with, and to make further provision as to, rate support grants and the limitation or reduction of rates and precepts of local authorities; and for connected purposes. (Repealed by Statute Law (Repeals) Act 2004 (c. 14))
Social Fund (Maternity and Funeral Expenses) Act 1987 (repealed)	1987 c. 7	17 March 1987
An Act to empower the Secretary of State to prescribe, under section 32(2)(a) of the Social Security Act 1986, (Note: Social Security Act 1986 (c. 50)) amounts, whether in respect of prescribed items or otherwise, to meet maternity expenses and funeral expenses. (Repealed by Social Security (Consequential Provisions) Act 1992 (c. 6))
Consolidated Fund Act 1987	1987 c. 8	25 March 1987
An Act to apply certain sums out of the Consolidated Fund to the service of the years ending on 31st March 1986 and 1987.
Animals (Scotland) Act 1987	1987 c. 9	9 April 1987
An Act to make provision for Scotland with respect to civil liability for injury or damage caused by animals, the detention of straying animals and the protection of persons or livestock from animals; and for connected purposes.
Broadcasting Act 1987	1987 c. 10	9 April 1987
An Act to alter the maximum period for which programmes may be provided under contracts with the Independent Broadcasting Authority.
Gaming (Amendment) Act 1987 (repealed)	1987 c. 11	9 April 1987
An Act to amend section 18 of the Gaming Act 1968 (Note: Gaming Act 1968 (c. 65)) with respect to the hours for gaming. (Repealed by Gambling Act 2005 (c. 19))
Petroleum Act 1987	1987 c. 12	9 April 1987
An Act to make provision in respect of the abandonment of offshore installations and submarine pipe-lines and in respect of safety zones around offshore installations; to amend the Petroleum (Production) Act 1934 (Note: Petroleum (Production) Act 1934 (24 & 25 Geo. 5. c. 36)) and to make provision in respect of licences under that Act; to amend the law relating to pipe-lines; to repeal sections 34 to 39 of the Petroleum and Submarine Pipe-lines Act 1975; (Note: Petroleum and Submarine Pipe-lines Act 1975 (c. 74)) and for connected purposes.
Minors' Contracts Act 1987	1987 c. 13	9 April 1987
An Act to amend the law relating to minors' contracts.
Recognition of Trusts Act 1987	1987 c. 14	9 April 1987
An Act to enable the United Kingdom to ratify the Convention on the law applicable to trusts and on their recognition (Note: Hague Trust Convention) which was signed on behalf of the United Kingdom on 10th January 1986.
Reverter of Sites Act 1987	1987 c. 15	9 April 1987
An Act to amend the law with respect to the reverter of sites that have ceased to be used for particular purposes; and for connected purposes.
Finance Act 1987	1987 c. 16	15 May 1987
An Act to grant certain duties, to alter other duties, and to amend the law relating to the National Debt and the Public Revenue, and to make further provision in connection with Finance.
Appropriation Act 1987	1987 c. 17	15 May 1987
An Act to apply a sum out of the Consolidated Fund to the service of the year ending on 31st March 1988, to appropriate the supplies granted in this Session of Parliament, and to repeal certain Consolidated Fund and Appropriation Acts.
Debtors (Scotland) Act 1987	1987 c. 18	15 May 1987
An Act to make new provision with regard to Scotland for an extension of time for payment of debts; to amend the law relating to certain diligences; to make provision in respect of messengers-at-arms and sheriff officers; and for connected purposes.
Billiards (Abolition of Restrictions) Act 1987 (repealed)	1987 c. 19	15 May 1987
An Act to abolish, as regards England and Wales, the restrictions by way of licensing or otherwise on the public playing of billiards, bagatelle and other games of the like kind, and a related power of entry. (Repealed by Statute Law (Repeals) Act 1989 (c. 43))
Chevening Estate Act 1987	1987 c. 20	15 May 1987
An Act to establish an incorporated board of trustees of the trusts contained in the trust instrument set out in the Schedule to the Chevening Estate Act 1959; (Note: Chevening Estate Act 1959 (7 & 8 Eliz. 2. c. 49)) to confer functions on, and to transfer property, rights and liabilities to, the board; to amend the trust instrument; and for purposes connected therewith.
Pilotage Act 1987	1987 c. 21	15 May 1987
An Act to make new provision in respect of pilotage.
Banking Act 1987 (repealed)	1987 c. 22	15 May 1987
An Act to make new provision for regulating the acceptance of deposits in the course of a business, for protecting depositors and for regulating the use of banking names and descriptions; to amend section 187 of the Consumer Credit Act 1974 (Note: Consumer Credit Act 1974 (c. 39)) in relation to arrangements for the electronic transfer of funds; to clarify the powers conferred by section 183 of the Financial Services Act 1986; (Note: Financial Services Act 1986 (c. 60)) and for purposes connected with those matters. (Repealed by Financial Services and Markets Act 2000 (Consequential Amendments and Repeals) Order 2001 (SI 2001/3649))
Register of Sasines (Scotland) Act 1987 or the Register of Sasines Act 1987 (Note: The Register of Sasines (Scotland) Act 1987 is sometimes referred to as the Register of Sasines Act 1987.)	1987 c. 23	15 May 1987
An Act to make provision as to the methods of keeping the Register of Sasines.
Immigration (Carriers' Liability) Act 1987 (repealed)	1987 c. 24	15 May 1987
An Act to require carriers to make payments to the Secretary of State in respect of passengers brought by them to the United Kingdom without proper documents. (Repealed by Immigration and Asylum Act 1999 (c. 33))
Crown Proceedings (Armed Forces) Act 1987	1987 c. 25	15 May 1987
An Act to repeal section 10 of the Crown Proceedings Act 1947 (Note: Crown Proceedings Act 1947 (10 & 11 Geo. 6. c. 44)) and to provide for the revival of that section in certain circumstances.
Housing (Scotland) Act 1987	1987 c. 26	15 May 1987
An Act to consolidate with amendments to give effect to recommendations of the Scottish Law Commission, certain enactments relating to housing in Scotland.
Fire Safety and Safety of Places of Sport Act 1987	1987 c. 27	15 May 1987
An Act to amend the Fire Precautions Act 1971 (Note: Fire Precautions Act 1971 (c. 40)) and other enactments relating to fire precautions; to amend the Safety of Sports Grounds Act 1975 (Note: Safety of Sports Grounds Act 1975 (c. 52)) and make like provision as respects stands at sports grounds; to extend as respects indoor sports premises, and amend, the statutory provisions regulating entertainment licences; and for connected purposes.
Deer Act 1987 (repealed)	1987 c. 28	15 May 1987
An Act to make it lawful for deer kept on deer farms in England and Wales to be killed during a close season. (Repealed by Deer Act 1991 (c. 54))
Agricultural Training Board Act 1987 (repealed)	1987 c. 29	15 May 1987
An Act to make further provision with respect to the functions of the Agricultural Training Board. (Repealed by Statute Law (Repeals) Act 2004 (c. 14))
Northern Ireland (Emergency Provisions) Act 1987 (repealed)	1987 c. 30	15 May 1987
An Act to amend the Northern Ireland (Emergency Provisions) Act 1978; (Note: Northern Ireland (Emergency Provisions) Act 1978 (c. 5)) to confer certain rights on persons detained in police custody in Northern Ireland under or by virtue of Part IV of the Prevention of Terrorism (Temporary Provisions) Act 1984; (Note: Prevention of Terrorism (Temporary Provisions) Act 1984 (c. 8)) to regulate the provision of security services there; and for connected purposes. (Repealed by Northern Ireland (Emergency Provisions) Act 1991 (c. 24))
Landlord and Tenant Act 1987	1987 c. 31	15 May 1987
An Act to confer on tenants of flats rights with respect to the acquisition by them of their landlord's reversion; to make provision for the appointment of a manager at the instance of such tenants and for the variation of long leases held by such tenants; to make further provision with respect to service charges payable by tenants of flats and other dwellings; to make other provision with respect to such tenants; to make further provision with respect to the permissible purposes and objects of registered housing associations as regards the management of leasehold property; and for connected purposes.
Crossbows Act 1987	1987 c. 32	15 May 1987
An Act to create offences relating to the sale and letting on hire of crossbows to, and the purchase, hiring and possession of crossbows by, persons under the age of seventeen; and for connected purposes.
AIDS (Control) Act 1987 (repealed)	1987 c. 33	15 May 1987
An Act to make provision in relation to Acquired Immune Deficiency Syndrome and Human Immunodeficiency Virus. (Repealed by Health and Social Care Act 2012 (c. 7))
Motor Cycle Noise Act 1987	1987 c. 34	15 May 1987
An Act to prohibit the supply of motor cycle exhaust systems and silencers likely to result in the emission of excessive noise; and for connected purposes.
Protection of Animals (Penalties) Act 1987	1987 c. 35	15 May 1987
An Act to amend the Protection of Animals Act 1911 (Note: Protection of Animals Act 1911 (1 & 2 Geo. 5. c. 27)) to increase the penalties for offences against animals under section 1(1).
Prescription (Scotland) Act 1987	1987 c. 36	15 May 1987
An Act to amend Part I of the Prescription and Limitation (Scotland) Act 1973; (Note: Prescription and Limitation (Scotland) Act 1973 (c. 52)) and for connected purposes.
Access to Personal Files Act 1987 (repealed)	1987 c. 37	15 May 1987
An Act to provide access for individuals to information relating to themselves maintained by certain authorities and to allow individuals to obtain copies of, and require amendment of, such information. (Repealed by Data Protection Act 1998 (c. 29))
Criminal Justice Act 1987	1987 c. 38	15 May 1987
An Act to make further provision for the investigation of and trials for fraud; and for connected purposes.
Parliamentary and Health Service Commissioners Act 1987	1987 c. 39	15 May 1987
An Act to make further provision in relation to the Parliamentary Commissioner for Administration and the Health Service Commissioners for England, Wales and Scotland, to provide for the appointment of persons for a limited period to act as the Parliamentary Commissioner or as a Health Service Commissioner, to extend the period within which complaints may be referred to the Health Service Commissioner for England or Wales by a body subject to investigation and to make fresh provision in relation to references of complaints to the Health Service Commissioner for Scotland.
Registered Establishments (Scotland) Act 1987 (repealed)	1987 c. 40	15 May 1987
An Act to make further provision as to the registration of establishments under the Social Work (Scotland) Act 1968 (Note: Social Work (Scotland) Act 1968 (c. 49)) and the Nursing Homes Registration (Scotland) Act 1938; (Note: Nursing Homes Registration (Scotland) Act 1938 (1 & 2 Geo. 6. c. 73)) and for connected purposes. (Repealed by Regulation of Care (Scotland) Act 2001 (asp 8))
Criminal Justice (Scotland) Act 1987	1987 c. 41	15 May 1987
An Act to make provision for Scotland as regards the recovery of the proceeds of drug trafficking; to make further provision as regards criminal justice in Scotland; and for connected purposes.
Family Law Reform Act 1987	1987 c. 42	15 May 1987
An Act to reform the law relating to the consequences of birth outside marriage; to make further provision with respect to the rights and duties of parents and the determination of parentage; and for connected purposes.
Consumer Protection Act 1987	1987 c. 43	15 May 1987
An Act to make provision with respect to the liability of persons for damage caused by defective products; to consolidate with amendments the Consumer Safety Act 1978 (Note: Consumer Safety Act 1978 (c. 38)) and the Consumer Safety (Amendment) Act 1986; (Note: Consumer Safety (Amendment) Act 1986 (c. 29)) to make provision with respect to the giving of price indications; to amend Part I of the Health and Safety at Work etc. Act 1974 (Note: Health and Safety at Work etc. Act 1974 (c. 37)) and sections 31 and 80 of the Explosives Act 1875; (Note: Explosives Act 1875 (38 & 39 Vict. c. 17)) to repeal the Trade Descriptions Act 1972 (Note: Trade Descriptions Act 1972 (c. 34)) and the Fabrics (Misdescription) Act 1913; (Note: Fabrics (Misdescription) Act 1913 (3 & 4 Geo. 5. c. 17)) and for connected purposes.
Local Government Act 1987 (repealed)	1987 c. 44	15 May 1987
An Act to amend Part VIII of the Local Government, Planning and Land Act 1980; to make further provision about the adjustment of block grant in connection with education; and for connected purposes. (Repealed by Statute Law (Repeals) Act 2004 (c. 14))
Parliamentary and other Pensions Act 1987	1987 c. 45	15 May 1987
An Act to provide for the continuance in existence of the Parliamentary Contributory Pension Fund; to confer power on the Leader of the House of Commons to make regulations with respect to that Fund and with respect to the application of the assets of that Fund in or towards the provision of pensions; to amend Mr Speaker King's Retirement Act 1971; (Note: Mr. Speaker King's Retirement Act 1971 (c. 13)) and for connected purposes.
Diplomatic and Consular Premises Act 1987	1987 c. 46	15 May 1987
An Act to make provision as to what land is diplomatic or consular premises; to give the Secretary of State power to vest certain land in himself; to impose on him a duty to sell land vested in him in the exercise of that power; to give certain provisions of the Vienna Convention on Diplomatic Relations (Note: Vienna Convention on Diplomatic Relations) and the Vienna Convention on Consular Relations (Note: Vienna Convention on Consular Relations) the force of law in the United Kingdom by amending Schedule 1 to the Diplomatic Privileges Act 1964 (Note: Diplomatic Privileges Act 1964 (c. 81)) and Schedule 1 to the Consular Relations Act 1968; (Note: Consular Relations Act 1968 (c. 18)) to amend section 9(2) of the Criminal Law Act 1977; (Note: Criminal Law Act 1977 (c. 45)) and for connected purposes.
Abolition of Domestic Rates Etc. (Scotland) Act 1987 (repealed)	1987 c. 47	15 May 1987
An Act to abolish domestic rates in Scotland; to provide as to the finance of local government in Scotland; and for connected purposes. (Repealed by Local Government Finance Act 1992 (c. 14))
Irish Sailors and Soldiers Land Trust Act 1987	1987 c. 48	15 May 1987
An Act to provide for the distribution of the surplus funds of the Irish Sailors and Soldiers Land Trust; and to make provision for the winding up and dissolution of the Trust.
Territorial Sea Act 1987	1987 c. 49	15 May 1987
An Act to provide for the extent of the territorial sea adjacent to the British Islands.
Appropriation (No. 2) Act 1987	1987 c. 50	23 July 1987
An Act to apply a sum out of the Consolidated Fund to the service of the year ending on 31st March 1988, and to appropriate the supplies granted in this Session of Parliament.
Finance (No. 2) Act 1987	1987 c. 51	23 July 1987
An Act to grant certain duties, to alter other duties, and to amend the law relating to the National Debt and the Public Revenue, and to make further provision in connection with Finance.
British Shipbuilders (Borrowing Powers) Act 1987 (repealed)	1987 c. 52	23 July 1987
An Act to raise the limits imposed by section 11(7) of the Aircraft and Shipbuilding Industries Act 1977 (Note: Aircraft and Shipbuilding Industries Act 1977 (c. 3)) in relation to the finances of British Shipbuilders and its wholly owned subsidiaries. (Repealed by Public Bodies (Abolition of British Shipbuilders) Order 2013 (SI 2013/687))
Channel Tunnel Act 1987	1987 c. 53	23 July 1987
An Act to provide for the construction and operation of a railway tunnel system under the English Channel, together with associated works; to provide for connected improvements in the road network near Ashford, in Kent, and in the rail network in South Eastern England; to incorporate part of the railway tunnel system into the United Kingdom and to provide for the application and enforcement of law in relation to, and otherwise for the regulation of, that system and matters connected with it; to provide for the construction of certain highways and associated works in the vicinity of Folkestone; and for connected purposes.
Consolidated Fund (No. 2) Act 1987	1987 c. 54	17 November 1987
An Act to apply a sum out of the Consolidated Fund to the service of the year ending on 31st March 1988.
Consolidated Fund (No. 3) Act 1987	1987 c. 55	10 December 1987
An Act to apply certain sums out of the Consolidated Fund to the service of the years ending on 31st March 1988 and 1989.
Scottish Development Agency Act 1987 (repealed)	1987 c. 56	17 December 1987
An Act to make provision with respect to the limit on sums borrowed by, or paid by the Secretary of State to, the Scottish Development Agency and its subsidiaries, on sums paid by the Treasury in pursuance of guarantee of loans to the Agency and on loans guaranteed by the Agency or its subsidiaries. (Repealed by Enterprise and New Towns (Scotland) Act 1990 (c. 35))
Urban Development Corporations (Financial Limits) Act 1987 or the Urban Development Corporation (Financial Limits) Act 1987 (Note: The Urban Development Corporations (Financial Limits) Act 1987 is sometimes referred to as the Urban Development Corporation (Financial Limits) Act 1987.) (repealed)	1987 c. 57	17 December 1987
An Act to remove the limit on the amount of grants that may be made to urban development corporations and to provide a new limit applicable only to the amounts for the time being outstanding in respect of sums borrowed by them and sums issued by the Treasury in fulfilment of guarantees of their debts. (Repealed by Statute Law (Repeals) Act 2008 (c. 12))

== Local acts ==
Short title	Citation	Royal assent
Long title
Gairloch Harbour Order Confirmation Act 1987	1987 c. i	19 January 1987
An Act to confirm a Provisional Order under the Private Legislation Procedure (Scotland) Act 1936, (Note: Private Legislation Procedure (Scotland) Act 1936 (26 Geo. 5 & 1 Edw. 8. c. 52)) relating to Gairloch Harbour.
	Gairloch Harbour Order 1986 (Note: Although passed in 1987, the short title specifies the year 1986.) Provisional Order to authorise the Highland Regional Council to acquire lands; to carry out works for the improvement of the harbour at Gairloch in the district of Ross and Cromarty; and for other purposes.	
Shetland Islands Council (Ham Voe, Foula) Order Confirmation Act 1987	1987 c. ii	19 January 1987
An Act to confirm a Provisional Order under the Private Legislation Procedure (Scotland) Act 1936, relating to Shetland Islands Council (Ham Voe, Foula).
	Shetland Islands Council (Ham Voe, Foula) Order 1986 Provisional Order to authorise the Shetland Islands Council to carry out works at their pier at Ham Voe, Foula; and for connected purposes.	
Advocates' Widows' and Orphans' Fund Order Confirmation Act 1987	1987 c. iii	2 March 1987
An Act to confirm a Provisional Order under the Private Legislation Procedure (Scotland) Act 1936, relating to The Advocates' Widows' and Orphans' Fund.
	Advocates' Widows' and Orphans' Fund Order 1986 Provisional Order to make provision for certain changes in the administration of the Advocates' Widows' and Orphans' Fund; and for purposes connected therewith.	
Plymouth City Council Act 1987	1987 c. iv	2 March 1987
An Act to re-enact with amendments certain local enactments in force within the city of Plymouth; to confer further powers with regard to the regulation of hackney carriages, public health and order, the Cottonian Collection and for the maintenance of piers; and for other purposes.
Port of Fosdyke Act 1987	1987 c. v	2 March 1987
An Act to establish Port of Fosdyke Limited as a harbour authority and to confer upon that company certain powers to enable it to operate the port of Fosdyke as a public harbour undertaking; to make other provision for the regulation of the port; and for other or connected purposes.
Brighton Marine Palace and Pier Act 1987	1987 c. vi	2 March 1987
An Act to authorise the Brighton Marine Palace and Pier Company to construct works and to confer further powers on the Company; and for other purposes.
Mid Glamorgan County Council Act 1987	1987 c. vii	2 March 1987
An Act to re-enact with amendments and to extend certain local enactments in force within the county of Mid Glamorgan; to confer further powers on the county council of Mid Glamorgan and the councils of the boroughs of Ogwr, Rhondda, Cynon Valley, Merthyr Tydfil and Taff-Ely and the district of Rhymney Valley; to make further provision in regard to the environment, local government, public health and improvement of the county and those boroughs and district; for the management and improvement of Porthcawl Harbour; and for other purposes.
West Glamorgan Act 1987	1987 c. viii	5 March 1987
An Act to re-enact with amendments and to extend certain local statutory provisions in force within the county of West Glamorgan; to confer further powers on the West Glamorgan County Council and local authorities in the county; to make further provision with respect to the improvement, health and local government of the county; and for other purposes.
County of Cleveland Act 1987	1987 c. ix	5 March 1987
An Act to re-enact with amendments certain local enactments in force within the county of Cleveland; to confer further powers on the local authorities in the county and to make further provision for the local government thereof; and for connected and other purposes.
Grampian Regional Council (Harbours) Order Confirmation Act 1987	1987 c. x	12 March 1987
An Act to confirm with amendments a Provisional Order under the Private Legislation Procedure (Scotland) Act 1936, relating to Grampian Regional Council (Harbours).
	Grampian Regional Council (Harbours) Order 1987 Provisional Order to make further and better provision for the administration, improvement and regulation of the harbours controlled by the Grampian Regional Council; to transfer the harbour at Banff to that Council; and for connected purposes.	
Exeter City Council Act 1987	1987 c. xi	9 April 1987
An Act to re-enact with amendments certain local enactments in force within the city of Exeter; to confer further powers on the Council of the City of Exeter; to make provision with regard to public safety, public health, environmental amenity within the city, the amenity of and control over the river Exe and its estuary; the local government and improvement of the city; and for other purposes.
Pontypridd Markets Fairs and Town Hall Act 1987	1987 c. xii	15 May 1987
An Act to confer further powers on the Pontypridd Markets Fairs and Town Hall Company Limited; and for other purposes.
British Railways (Stansted) Act 1987	1987 c. xiii	15 May 1987
An Act to empower the British Railways Board to construct works and to purchase or use land in the district of Uttlesford in the county of Essex; to confer further powers on the Board; and for other purposes.
Aberystwyth Harbour Act 1987	1987 c. xiv	15 May 1987
An Act to empower the Ceredigion District Council (Cyngor Dosbarth Ceredigion) to construct works and to purchase or use lands at Aberystwyth Harbour; to confer powers on the Council as the harbour authority for that harbour; for the provision of facilities therein; for the regulation of the harbour; and for other purposes.
City of London (Various Powers) Act 1987	1987 c. xv	15 May 1987
An Act to confer powers on the Corporation of London for adjustment of the site of Billingsgate Market and to make further provision with respect to the market; to make new provision for the control of street trading and related activity in Middlesex Street; to confer powers for the making of drainage byelaws and charges on the submission of plans; to amend provisions relating to city walkways, Bank Underground Station, the register of commoners of Epping Forest and other enactments; and for other purposes.
Brighton Marine Palace and Pier (Finance, &c.) Act 1987	1987 c. xvi	15 May 1987
An Act to authorise the Brighton Marine Palace and Pier Company to raise additional capital and to confer other powers on the Company in relation to their undertaking; and for other purposes.
London Underground (Goodge Street) Act 1987	1987 c. xvii	15 May 1987
An Act to empower London Underground Limited to acquire land; to confer further powers on the Company; and for other purposes.
Western Isles Islands Council (Vatersay Causeway) Order Confirmation Act 1987	1987 c. xviii	23 July 1987
An Act to confirm a Provisional Order under the Private Legislation Procedure (Scotland) Act 1936, relating to Western Isles Islands Council (Vatersay Causeway).
	Western Isles Islands Council (Vatersay Causeway) Order 1987 Provisional Order to authorise the Western Isles Islands Council to construct a causeway for pedestrian and vehicular traffic between the islands of Barra and Vatersay in the Western Isles Islands Area.	
Masonic Trust for Girls and Boys Act 1987	1987 c. xix	23 July 1987
An Act to provide for the transfer to the Trustees of the Masonic Trust for Girls and Boys of all outstanding rights, property and liabilities of the Royal Masonic Institution for Boys and of the Royal Masonic Institution for Girls; and for other purposes.
Essex Act 1987	1987 c. xx	23 July 1987
An Act to re-enact with amendments and to extend certain local statutory provisions in force within the county of Essex; to confer further powers on the Essex County Council, local authorities in the county and the Crouch Harbour Authority; to make further provision with respect to the improvement, health and local government of the county; and for other purposes.
Aberdeen Harbour Order Confirmation Act 1987	1987 c. xxi	16 November 1987
An Act to confirm a Provisional Order under the Private Legislation Procedure (Scotland) Act 1936, relating to Aberdeen Harbour.
	Aberdeen Harbour Order 1987 Provisional Order to amend the constitution and functions of the Aberdeen Harbour Board; to re-define the limits of the port and harbour of Aberdeen; and for other purposes.	
National Provident Institution Act 1987	1987 c. xxii	16 November 1987
An Act to repeal the National Provident Institution Act 1910 (Note: National Provident Institution Act 1910 (10 Edw. 7 & 1 Geo. 5. c. ix)) and the National Provident Institution Act 1964; (Note: National Provident Institution Act 1964 (c. xxiii)) to make new provision for the regulation and management of the National Provident Institution; and for other purposes.
Bexley London Borough Council Act 1987	1987 c. xxiii	16 November 1987
An Act to make provision with reference to markets at Erith in the London Borough of Bexley; to empower the Council of that borough to apply to that borough provisions of the Local Government (Miscellaneous Provisions) Act 1982 (Note: Local Government (Miscellaneous Provisions) Act 1982 (c. 30)) relating to street trading; and for purposes connected therewith.
Dyfed Act 1987	1987 c. xxiv	17 November 1987
An Act to re-enact with amendments and extend certain local statutory provisions in force within the county of Dyfed; to confer further powers on the Dyfed County Council and local authorities and community councils in the county; to make further provision with respect to the improvement, health and local government of the county; to continue in force, with amendments, local statutory provisions relating to the Portfield Recreation Committee; and for other purposes.
Highland Region Harbours (Miscellaneous Powers) Order Confirmation Act 1987	1987 c. xxv	10 December 1987
An Act to confirm a Provisional Order under the Private Legislation Procedure (Scotland) Act 1936, relating to Highland Region Harbours (Miscellaneous Powers).
	Highland Region Harbours (Miscellaneous Powers) Order 1987 Provisional Order to confer powers on the Highland Regional Council with respect to the management, regulation and control of their harbours; and for connected purposes.	
Lerwick Harbour Order Confirmation Act 1987	1987 c. xxvi	10 December 1987
An Act to confirm a Provisional Order under the Private Legislation Procedure (Scotland) Act 1936, relating to Lerwick Harbour.
	Lerwick Harbour Order 1987 Provisional Order to authorise the Trustees of the port and harbour of Lerwick to carry out works for the improvement of the harbour and the facilities thereat; including a dry dock; to make charges for the use of the dry dock; to make further provision for parking places; and for other purposes.	
Associated British Ports Act 1987	1987 c. xxvii	10 December 1987
An Act to empower Associated British Ports to construct works and to acquire lands; to confer further powers on A.B. Ports; and for other purposes.
British Waterways Act 1987	1987 c. xxviii	17 December 1987
An Act to empower the British Waterways Board to construct works and to acquire lands for the restoration of the canal from Newtown to Frankton Junction; to make further provision with respect to such restoration; and for other purposes.
British Railways Act 1987	1987 c. xxix	17 December 1987
An Act to empower the British Railways Board to construct works and to purchase or use land; to confer further powers on the Board and on British Rail Pension Trustee Company Limited and British Railways Savings Company Limited; and for other purposes.

== Private and personal acts ==
Short title	Citation	Royal assent
Long title
John Ernest Rolfe and Florence Iveen Rolfe (Marriage Enabling) Act 1987	1987 c. 1 Pr.	15 May 1987
An Act to enable John Ernest Rolfe and Florence Iveen Rolfe to be married to each other.
George Donald Evans and Deborah Jane Evans (Marriage Enabling) Act 1987	1987 c. 2 Pr.	15 May 1987
An Act to enable George Donald Evans and Deborah Jane Evans to be married to each other.

== See also ==
- List of acts of the Parliament of the United Kingdom
