= North Sea Transition Authority =

United Kingdom government agency

Oil and Gas Authority
- Trade name: North Sea Transition Authority (from 21 March 2022 (Note: The Companies Act 2006, section 81(1) provides that "A change of a company’s name has effect from the date on which the new certificate of incorporation is issued." As of 24 April 2022, a new certificate of incorporation changing the Oil and Gas Authority's legal name to North Sea Transition Authority has not been issued; its legal name therefore remains Oil and Gas Authority.)
- Formerly: Oil and Gas Authority Limited (1 July 2015 – 11 July 2016)
- Type: Private limited company
- Founded: 1 July 2015; 11 years ago
- Headquarters: Aberdeen, Scotland
- Key people: Liz Ditchburn (chairwoman); Stuart Payne (chief executive)
- Operating income: ▼£42.0 million (2026)
- Total assets: ▲£22.1 million (2026)
- Owner: Secretary of State for Energy Security and Net Zero
- Number of employees: 239 (2026)
- Website: www.nstauthority.co.uk

The North Sea Transition Authority (NSTA), known as the Oil and Gas Authority (OGA) until March 2022, is a private company limited by shares wholly owned by the Secretary of State for Energy Security and Net Zero. It is responsible for maximising the economic recovery of oil from the North Sea. It is empowered to license and regulate activity in relation to oil and gas in the United Kingdom, including oil and gas exploration, carbon capture and storage, and offshore gas storage.

The NSTA's role is to take the steps necessary to:

1. secure that the maximum value of economically recoverable petroleum is recovered from the strata beneath relevant UK waters; and, in doing so,
2. take appropriate steps to assist the Secretary of State in meeting the net zero target, including by reducing as far as reasonable in the circumstances greenhouse gas emissions from sources such as flaring and venting and power generation, and supporting carbon capture and storage projects.

Established in April 2015 as a non-departmental public body of the then Department for Business, Energy and Industrial Strategy (now the Department for Energy Security and Net Zero), on 1 October 2016 the Oil and Gas Authority was incorporated, with the then Secretary of State for Business, Energy and Industrial Strategy (now the Secretary of State for Energy Security and Net Zero) the sole shareholder and headquartered in Aberdeen with another office in London, which is also its registered company address. As of the 22 October 2024, Liz Ditchburn is the chair.

== History ==
In June 2013, the UK government asked Sir Ian Wood of Wood Group to conduct a review to maximise the recovery of oil and gas from the UK Continental Shelf. One of the recommendations of the Wood Review was the creation of an independent economic regulator for the sector. Subsequently, the OGA was launched on 1 April 2015 as an executive agency of the Department of Energy and Climate Change. The Energy Act 2016, which received royal assent in May 2016, created the legislative framework to formally establish the OGA as a government company, limited by shares under the Companies Act 2006, with the then Secretary of State for Business, Energy and Industrial Strategy (now the Secretary of State for Energy Security and Net Zero) the sole shareholder. The Energy Act 2016 also provided the OGA with new regulatory powers, including the ability to participate in meetings with operators, to have access to data, provide dispute resolution and introduce a range of sanctions such as enforcement notices and fines of up to £1 million. On 6 March 2019, Frances Morris-Jones was replaced by Tim Eggar as the chairman of the authority.

== Fracking ==
On 1 November 2019, following a report from the Oil and Gas Authority, the government called a halt to all fracking in the UK "with immediate effect" and warned shale gas companies that it would not support future projects.

== Corporate information ==
=== Name ===
On 1 July 2015, Oil and Gas Authority Limited was incorporated as a private limited company in England and Wales under the Companies Act 2006, although following incorporation it remained dormant for financial year 2015–2016. Pursuant to the Energy Act 2016, Oil and Gas Authority Limited was renamed Oil and Gas Authority on 12 July 2016. Under the Companies Act 2006, private limited companies are required to include the word "limited" in their names unless exempted; the Energy Act 2016 provided for such an exemption, which came into force on 12 July 2016.

On 21 March 2022, the Oil and Gas Authority adopted the trading name of North Sea Transition Authority, although its legal name remains unchanged. In a House of Commons debate on 29 March 2022, Caroline Lucas accused the government of greenwashing over the change of name. Following this, on 31 March 2022, Greg Hands, Minister for Energy, Clean Growth and Climate Change, said in a written statement to the House of Commons that "the new name better represents the breadth of work it now undertakes and its pivotal role in supporting the UK upstream oil and gas industry to achieve net zero emissions".

=== Functions, powers, and property ===
Under Part 1 of the Energy Act 2016, the function, powers, and property of the Secretary of State for Energy Security and Net Zero may be transferred to the Oil and Gas Authority by way of a statutory instrument.

=== Personnel ===
Part 1 of the Energy Act also provides for the Secretary of State to transfer staff working for the Department for Energy Security and Net Zero to the Oil and Gas Authority. From 2015 until December 2022, Andy Samuel was chief executive, being replaced by Stuart Payne in January 2023, and since 2019 Tim Eggar has been chairman of the board.

In September 2021 Greenpeace reported that eight of OGA's 13 board members and senior managers had previously worked in the industry, and three held sizeable shareholdings in oil firms. The OGA said their knowledge was vital in helping to regulate the sector.

=== Ownership ===
Oil and Gas Authority has one ordinary share, which from 2016 until 2023 was owned by the Secretary of State for Business, Energy and Industrial Strategy. Its owner remained unchanged, with each subsequent confirmation statement showing no shareholder changes, until 3 May 2023 when it was transferred to the Secretary of State for Energy Security and Net Zero by order in council upon the incorporation of that office. (Note: On 3 May 2023 The Secretaries of State for Energy Security and Net Zero, for Science, Innovation and Technology, for Business and Trade, and for Culture, Media and Sport and the Transfer of Functions (National Security and Investment Act 2021 etc) Order 2023 came into force, article 8(1) of which transferred "all property, rights and liabilities to which the Secretary of State for Business, Energy and Industrial Strategy is entitled or subject at the coming into force of this Order in connection with any energy function", where 'energy function' means any function so far as "(a) it is transferred by article 7 [of the Order], or (b) it was entrusted to the Secretary of State for Business, Energy and Industrial Strategy immediately before 6th February 2023 and has before the making of this Order been entrusted to the Secretary of State for Energy Security and Net Zero.")
