= List of acts of the Parliament of the United Kingdom from 1932 =

This is a complete list of acts of the Parliament of the United Kingdom for the year 1932.

Note that the first parliament of the United Kingdom was held in 1801; parliaments between 1707 and 1800 were either parliaments of Great Britain or of Ireland). For acts passed up until 1707, see the list of acts of the Parliament of England and the list of acts of the Parliament of Scotland. For acts passed from 1707 to 1800, see the list of acts of the Parliament of Great Britain. See also the list of acts of the Parliament of Ireland.

For acts of the devolved parliaments and assemblies in the United Kingdom, see the list of acts of the Scottish Parliament, the list of acts of the Northern Ireland Assembly, and the list of acts and measures of Senedd Cymru; see also the list of acts of the Parliament of Northern Ireland.

The number shown after each act's title is its chapter number. Acts passed before 1963 are cited using this number, preceded by the year(s) of the reign during which the relevant parliamentary session was held; thus the Union with Ireland Act 1800 is cited as "39 & 40 Geo. 3 c. 67", meaning the 67th act passed during the session that started in the 39th year of the reign of George III and which finished in the 40th year of that reign. Note that the modern convention is to use Arabic numerals in citations (thus "41 Geo. 3" rather than "41 Geo. III"). Acts of the last session of the Parliament of Great Britain and the first session of the Parliament of the United Kingdom are both cited as "41 Geo. 3". Acts passed from 1963 onwards are simply cited by calendar year and chapter number.

== 22 & 23 Geo. 5 ==
Continuing the first session of the 36th Parliament of the United Kingdom, which met from 3 November 1931 until 17 November 1932.

This session was also traditionally cited as 22 & 23 G. 5.

=== Public general acts ===
Short title	Citation	Royal assent
Long title
Import Duties Act 1932 (repealed)	22 & 23 Geo. 5. c. 8	29 February 1932
An Act to provide for the imposition of a general ad valorem duty of customs and of additional duties on any goods chargeable with the duty aforesaid, for the imposition of duties on goods produced or manufactured in a foreign country which discriminates in the matter of importation as against goods produced or manufactured in the United Kingdom, in certain other parts of His Majesty's dominions, in protectorates or in mandated territories, and for purposes connected with the matters aforesaid. (Repealed by Import Duties Act 1958 (6 & 7 Eliz. 2. c. 6))
Merchant Shipping (Safety and Load Line Conventions) Act 1932	22 & 23 Geo. 5. c. 9	17 March 1932
An Act to give effect to an International Convention for the Safety of Life at Sea, signed in London on the thirty-first day of May, nineteen hundred and twenty-nine, to give effect to an International Load Line Convention signed in London on the fifth day of July, nineteen hundred and thirty, and to amend the provisions of the Merchant Shipping Acts, 1894 to 1928, relating to passenger steamers, life-saving appliances, wireless telegraphy, load lines, timber cargoes, and other matters affected by the said Conventions.
Veterinary Surgeons (Irish Free State Agreement) Act 1932 (repealed)	22 & 23 Geo. 5. c. 10	17 March 1932
An Act to confirm and give effect to a certain agreement made between His Majesty's Government in the United Kingdom and His Majesty's Government in the Irish Free State with respect to the registration and control of veterinary surgeons. (Repealed by Veterinary Surgeons Act 1966 (c. 36))
Northern Ireland (Miscellaneous Provisions) Act 1932	22 & 23 Geo. 5. c. 11	17 March 1932
An Act to make miscellaneous amendments in the law applicable to Northern Ireland.
Destructive Imported Animals Act 1932	22 & 23 Geo. 5. c. 12	17 March 1932
An Act to make provision for prohibiting or controlling the importation into and the keeping within Great Britain of destructive non-indigenous animals, for exterminating any such animals which may be at large and for purposes connected with the matters aforesaid. (Repealed for Scotland by Wildlife and Natural Environment (Scotland) Act 2011 (asp 6))
Financial Emergency Enactments (Continuance) Act 1932 (repealed)	22 & 23 Geo. 5. c. 13	17 March 1932
An Act to continue in force certain enactments passed in connection with the financial emergency which arose in the year nineteen hundred and thirty-one. (Repealed by Statute Law Revision Act 1950 (14 Geo. 6. c. 6))
Consolidated Fund (No. 1) Act 1932 (repealed)	22 & 23 Geo. 5. c. 14	24 March 1932
An Act to apply certain sums out of the Consolidated Fund to the service of the years ending on the thirty-first day of March, one thousand nine hundred and thirty-one, one thousand nine hundred and thirty-two and one thousand nine hundred and thirty-three. (Repealed by Statute Law Revision Act 1950 (14 Geo. 6. c. 6))
Dangerous Drugs Act 1932 (repealed)	22 & 23 Geo. 5. c. 15	24 March 1932
An Act to amend the Dangerous Drugs Acts, 1920 to 1925, so far as is necessary to enable effect to be given to a Convention signed at Geneva on behalf of His Majesty on the thirteenth day of July, nineteen hundred and thirty-one, and to make provision for the extension of those Acts to drugs capable of being converted into dangerous drugs. (Repealed by Dangerous Drugs Act 1951 (14 & 15 Geo. 6. c. 48))
Isle of Man (Customs) Act 1932 (repealed)	22 & 23 Geo. 5. c. 16	24 March 1932
An Act to amend the Law with respect to Customs in the Isle of Man. (Repealed for the Isle of Man by Customs and Excise etc. Order 1976 (GC No 1/76))
Tanganyika and British Honduras Loans Act 1932 (repealed)	22 & 23 Geo. 5. c. 17	24 March 1932
An Act to authorise the Treasury to guarantee a loan to be raised by the Government of Tanganyika, to authorise a loan to the Government of British Honduras, and to authorise the making of advances out of moneys provided by Parliament for the payment of the annual or half-yearly charges in respect of the said loans for a limited period. (Repealed by Statute Law (Repeals) Act 1976 (c. 16))
Rating and Valuation Act 1932 (repealed)	22 & 23 Geo. 5. c. 18	24 March 1932
An Act to extend the duration of certain temporary provisions contained in the Rating and Valuation Act, 1928. (Note: Rating and Valuation Act 1928 (18 & 19 Geo. 5. c. 8)) (Repealed by Rating and Valuation (Miscellaneous Provisions) Act 1955 (4 & 5 Eliz. 2. c. 9))
Transitional Payments Prolongation (Unemployed Persons) Act 1932 (repealed)	22 & 23 Geo. 5. c. 19	14 April 1932
An Act to extend until the expiration of the Unemployment Insurance Act, 1930, (Note: Unemployment Insurance Act 1930 (20 & 21 Geo. 5. c. 16)) the period in respect of which transitional payments may be made in certain cases under the Unemployment Insurance (National Economy) (No. 2) Order, 1931. (Note: Unemployment Insurance (National Economy) (No. 2) Order 1931 (SR&O 1931/853)) (Repealed by Unemployment Act 1934 (24 & 25 Geo. 5. c. 29))
Chancel Repairs Act 1932	22 & 23 Geo. 5. c. 20	25 April 1932
An Act to abolish proceedings in ecclesiastical courts for enforcing liability to repair certain chancels and to substitute other proceedings in lieu thereof, and otherwise to amend the law relating to such liability.
President of the Board of Trade Act 1932 (repealed)	22 & 23 Geo. 5. c. 21	25 April 1932
An Act to remove the incapacity of the President of the Board of Trade for being elected and sitting and voting as a member of the Commons House of Parliament, and to indemnify certain holders of that office from any penal consequence which they may have incurred by sitting or voting as members of the said House at any time while they were not capable of so doing as being holders of that office. (Repealed by Ministers of the Crown Act 1937 (1 Edw. 8 & 1 Geo. 6. c. 38) and Statute Law Revision Act 1950 (14 Geo. 6. c. 6))
Army and Air Force (Annual) Act 1932 (repealed)	22 & 23 Geo. 5. c. 22	28 April 1932
An Act to provide, during Twelve Months, for the Discipline and Regulation of the Army and the Air Force. (Repealed by Army and Air Force (Annual) Act 1949 (12, 13 & 14 Geo. 6. c. 28), Statute Law Revision Act 1950 (14 Geo. 6. c. 6), Statute Law Revision Act 1953 (2 & 3 Eliz. 2. c. 5) and Revision of the Army and Air Force Acts (Transitional Provisions) Act 1955 (3 & 4 Eliz. 2. c. 20))
Grey Seals Protection Act 1932 (repealed)	22 & 23 Geo. 5. c. 23	12 May 1932
An Act to make further provision for the protection of the Grey Seal. (Repealed by Conservation of Seals Act 1970 (c. 30))
Wheat Act 1932 (repealed)	22 & 23 Geo. 5. c. 24	12 May 1932
An Act to secure to growers of home-grown millable wheat a standard price and a market therefor; to make provision for imposing on millers and importers of flour obligations to make payments calculated by reference to a quota of such wheat and as to the disposal of the moneys thereby received; to provide for such millers being required to purchase unsold stocks of such wheat; and for purposes connected with the matters aforesaid. (Repealed by Agriculture Act 1957 (5 & 6 Eliz. 2. c. 57))
Finance Act 1932 (repealed)	22 & 23 Geo. 5. c. 25	16 June 1932
An Act to grant certain duties of Customs and Inland Revenue (including Excise), to alter other duties, to amend the law relating to the Inland Revenue (including Excise) and the National Debt, to amend the Import Duties Act, 1932, (Note: Import Duties Act 1932 (22 & 23 Geo. 5. c. 8)) in certain particulars, and also other enactments relating to the Customs, and to make further provision in connection with Finance. (Repealed by Statute Law (Repeals) Act 2008 (c. 12))
Universities (Scotland) Act 1932	22 & 23 Geo. 5. c. 26	16 June 1932
An Act to transfer to the University Courts the right of presentation or appointment to certain chairs or professorships in the faculties of divinity or theology in the universities of Scotland; to remove restrictions as regards appointment to chairs or professorships in the said universities; to extend the powers of the University Courts of the said universities with regard to the making of ordinances, and for purposes connected therewith.
Law of Property (Entailed Interests) Act 1932	22 & 23 Geo. 5. c. 27	16 June 1932
An Act to prevent the conversion of entailed interests into absolute interests and the destruction of interests expectant thereon by the statutory trusts for sale, and to define the expression "rent charge in possession."
Public Health (Cleansing of Shell-fish) Act 1932 (repealed)	22 & 23 Geo. 5. c. 28	16 June 1932
An Act to enable local authorities to provide or contribute towards the provision of means for cleansing shell-fish. (Repealed for England and Wales by Food and Drugs Act 1938 (1 & 2 Geo. 6. c. 56) and for Scotland by Food and Drugs (Scotland) Act 1956 (4 & 5 Eliz. 2. c. 30))
Coal Mines Act 1932 (repealed)	22 & 23 Geo. 5. c. 29	16 June 1932
An Act to continue Part I of the Coal Mines Act, 1930, (Note: Coal Mines Act 1930 (20 & 21 Geo. 5. c. 34)) and section one of the Coal Mines Act, 1931. (Note: Coal Mines Act 1931 (21 & 22 Geo. 5. c. 27)) (Repealed by Coal Industry Act 1992 (c. 17))
Irish Free State (Special Duties) Act 1932 (repealed)	22 & 23 Geo. 5. c. 30	12 July 1932
An Act to provide for the imposition of customs duties on goods imported directly or indirectly from the Irish Free State with a view to making good any loss incurred by, or any additional charge imposed on, any public fund of the United Kingdom by reason of any failure of the Government of the Irish Free State to implement their obligations, and for purposes connected with the matters aforesaid. (Repealed by Eire (Confirmation of Agreements) Act 1938 (1 & 2 Geo. 6. c. 25))
Marriage (Naval, Military, and Air Force Chapels) Act 1932 (repealed)	22 & 23 Geo. 5. c. 31	12 July 1932
An Act to authorise the publication of banns and the solemnization of marriages in naval, military, and air force chapels. (Repealed by Marriage Act 1949 (12, 13 & 14 Geo. 6. c. 76))
Patents and Designs Act 1932 (repealed)	22 & 23 Geo. 5. c. 32	12 July 1932
An Act to amend the Patents and Designs Acts, 1907 to 1928. (Repealed by Statute Law (Repeals) Act 1986 (c. 12))
Rating and Valuation (No. 2) Act 1932 (repealed)	22 & 23 Geo. 5. c. 33	12 July 1932
An Act to amend section forty of the Rating and Valuation Act, 1925. (Note: Rating and Valuation Act 1925 (15 & 16 Geo. 5. c. 90)) (Repealed by Local Government Act 1948 (11 & 12 Geo. 6. c. 26))
British Museum Act 1932 (repealed)	22 & 23 Geo. 5. c. 34	12 July 1932
An Act to enable the Trustees of the British Museum to except certain publications from the provisions of subsection (1) of section fifteen of the Copyright Act, 1911. (Note: Copyright Act 1911 (1 & 2 Geo. 5. c. 46)) (Repealed by Legal Deposit Libraries Act 2003 (c. 28))
Agricultural Credits Act 1932 (repealed)	22 & 23 Geo. 5. c. 35	12 July 1932
An Act to make provision with respect to mortgages for securing loans made by the company formed for the purposes of Part I of the Agricultural Credits Act, 1928. (Note: Agricultural Credits Act 1928 (18 & 19 Geo. 5. c. 43)) (Repealed by Agriculture and Forestry (Financial Provisions) Act 1991 (c. 33))
Carriage by Air Act 1932 (repealed)	22 & 23 Geo. 5. c. 36	12 July 1932
An Act to give effect to a Convention for the unification of certain rules, relating to inter-national carriage by air, (Note: Warsaw Convention) to make provision for applying the rules contained in the said Convention, subject to exceptions, adaptations and modifications, to carriage by air which is not international carriage within the meaning of the Convention, and for purposes connected with the purposes aforesaid. (Repealed by Carriage by Air Act 1961 (9 & 10 Eliz. 2. c. 27))
Solicitors Act 1932 (repealed)	22 & 23 Geo. 5. c. 37	12 July 1932
An Act to consolidate the Solicitors Acts, 1839 to 1928, and other enactments relating to solicitors of the Supreme Court. (Repealed by Solicitors Act 1957 (5 & 6 Eliz. 2. c. 27))
Hire Purchase and Small Debt (Scotland) Act 1932 (repealed)	22 & 23 Geo. 5. c. 38	12 July 1932
An Act to amend the law of Scotland with regard to the purchase and hire of articles not exceeding twenty pounds in value by payment in instalments, and with regard to proceedings in the sheriff's small debt court. (Repealed by Sheriff Courts (Scotland) Act 1971 (c. 58))
Extradition Act 1932 (repealed)	22 & 23 Geo. 5. c. 39	12 July 1932
An Act to include offences in relation to dangerous drugs, and attempts to commit such offences, among extradition crimes. (Repealed by Extradition Act 1989 (c. 33))
Gas Undertakings Act 1932 (repealed)	22 & 23 Geo. 5. c. 40	12 July 1932
An Act to amend the law with respect to gas undertakings. (Repealed by Gas Act 1948 (11 & 12 Geo. 6. c. 67))
Isle of Man (Customs) (No. 2) Act 1932 (repealed)	22 & 23 Geo. 5. c. 41	12 July 1932
An Act to amend the law with respect to Customs in the Isle of Man. (Repealed for the Isle of Man by Customs and Excise etc. Order 1976 (GC No 1/76))
Public Works Loans Act 1932 (repealed)	22 & 23 Geo. 5. c. 42	12 July 1932
An Act to grant money for the purpose of certain local loans out of the Local Loans Fund, and for other purposes relating to local loans. (Repealed by Statute Law Revision Act 1950 (14 Geo. 6. c. 6))
Malta Constitution Act 1932 (repealed)	22 & 23 Geo. 5. c. 43	12 July 1932
An Act to amend the Constitution of Malta and to remove doubts as to the validity of certain Letters Patent and other enactments relating to Malta. (Repealed by Malta Independence Act 1964 (c. 86))
Bills of Exchange Act (1882) Amendment Act 1932 (repealed)	22 & 23 Geo. 5. c. 44	12 July 1932
An Act to amend the Bills of Exchange Act, 1882. (Note: Bills of Exchange Act 1882 (45 & 46 Vict. c. 61)) (Repealed by Cheques Act 1957 (5 & 6 Eliz. 2. c. 36))
Rights of Way Act 1932 (repealed)	22 & 23 Geo. 5. c. 45	12 July 1932
An Act to amend the law relating to public rights of way; and for purposes connected therewith. (Repealed by Highways Act 1959 (7 & 8 Eliz. 2. c. 25) and London Government Act 1963 (c. 33))
Children and Young Persons Act 1932 (repealed)	22 & 23 Geo. 5. c. 46	12 July 1932
An Act to make further and better provision for the protection and welfare of the young and the treatment of young offenders; to amend the Children Act, 1908, (Note: Children Act 1908 (8 Edw. 7. c. 67)) and other enactments relating to the young; and for objects connected with the purposes aforesaid. (Repealed by Statute Law (Repeals) Act 1977 (c. 18))
Children and Young Persons (Scotland) Act 1932 (repealed)	22 & 23 Geo. 5. c. 47	12 July 1932
An Act to make further and better provision in Scotland for the protection and welfare of the young and the treatment of young offenders; to amend in their application to Scotland the Children Act, 1908, and other enactments relating to the young; and for objects connected with the purposes aforesaid. (Repealed by Law Reform (Parent and Child) (Scotland) Act 1986 (c. 9))
Town and Country Planning Act 1932 (repealed)	22 & 23 Geo. 5. c. 48	12 July 1932
An Act to authorise the making of schemes with respect to the development and planning of land, whether urban or rural, and in that connection to repeal and re-enact with amendments the enactments relating to town planning; to provide for the protection of rural amenities and the preservation of buildings and other objects of interest or beauty; to facilitate the acquisition of land for garden cities; and to make other provision in connection with the matters aforesaid. (Repealed by Town and Country Planning Act 1947 (10 & 11 Geo. 6. c. 51))
Town and Country Planning (Scotland) Act 1932 (repealed)	22 & 23 Geo. 5. c. 49	12 July 1932
An Act to authorise the making of schemes with respect to the development and planning of land in Scotland, whether urban or rural, and in that connection to repeal and re-enact with amendments, the enactments relating to town planning; to provide for the protection of rural amenities and the preservation of buildings and other objects of interest or beauty; to facilitate the acquisition of land in Scotland for garden cities; and to make other provision in connection with the matters aforesaid. (Repealed by Town and Country Planning (Scotland) Act 1947 (10 & 11 Geo. 6. c. 53))
Appropriation Act 1932 (repealed)	22 & 23 Geo. 5. c. 50	13 July 1932
An Act to apply a sum out of the Consolidated Fund to the service of the year ending on the thirty-first day of March, one thousand nine hundred and thirty-three, and to appropriate the Supplies granted in this Session of Parliament. (Repealed by Statute Law Revision Act 1950 (14 Geo. 6. c. 6))
Sunday Entertainments Act 1932 (repealed)	22 & 23 Geo. 5. c. 51	13 July 1932
An Act to permit and regulate the opening and use of places on Sundays for certain entertainments and for debates, and for purposes connected with the matters aforesaid. (Repealed by Licensing Act 2003 (c. 17))
National Health Insurance and Contributory Pensions Act 1932 (repealed)	22 & 23 Geo. 5. c. 52	13 July 1932
An Act to amend the enactments relating to National Health Insurance; to amend the Widows', Orphans' and Old Age Contributory Pensions Act, 1925, (Note: Widows', Orphans' and Old Age Contributory Pensions Act 1925 (15 & 16 Geo. 5. c. 70)) by making provision for the payment of pensions thereunder in respect of the insurance of persons who cease to be insured within twelve months before death or before attaining the age of sixty-five, and by modifying the statutory conditions applicable to such pensions in the case of persons who, after ceasing to be insured, again become insured; to repeal subsection (7) of section forty-four of the said Act; and for purposes connected therewith. (Repealed by National Health Insurance Act 1936 (26 Geo. 5 & 1 Edw. 8. c. 32) and Widows', Orphans' and Old Age Contributory Pensions Act 1936 (26 Geo. 5 & 1 Edw. 8. c. 33))
Ottawa Agreements Act 1932 (repealed)	22 & 23 Geo. 5. c. 53	15 November 1932
An Act to enable effect to be given to the Agreements made on the twentieth day of August, nineteen hundred and thirty-two, at the Imperial Economic Conference held at Ottawa, and to a certain announcement made at that Conference on behalf of His Majesty's Government in the United Kingdom, by imposing and providing for the imposition of certain duties of customs and otherwise, to make further provision for Imperial preference, and for purposes consequential on and connected with the matters aforesaid. (Repealed by Statute Law (Repeals) Act 1986 (c. 12))
Transitional Payments (Determination of Need) Act 1932 (repealed)	22 & 23 Geo. 5. c. 54	17 November 1932
An Act to provide that certain rules shall be complied with in determining the need of applicants for transitional payments under the Unemployment Insurance (National Economy) (No. 2) Order, 1931; and to enable the same rules to be observed in granting outdoor relief under the enactments relating to the poor law. (Repealed by Statute Law Revision Act 1950 (14 Geo. 6. c. 6))
Administration of Justice Act 1932 (repealed)	22 & 23 Geo. 5. c. 55	17 November 1932
An Act to amend the law with respect to appeals from decisions of official referees, to amend in certain particulars the Supreme Court of Judicature (Consolidation) Act, 1925, (Note: Supreme Court of Judicature (Consolidation) Act 1925 (15 & 16 Geo. 5 c. 49)) and section thirty-eight of the Solicitors Act, 1932, (Note: Solicitors Act 1932 (22 & 23 Geo. 5. c. 37)) and to make provision for the costs of applications under section eighty-four of the Law of Property Act, 1925. (Note: Law of Property Act 1925 (15 & 16 Geo. 5. c. 20)) (Repealed by Senior Courts Act 1981 (c. 54))

=== Local acts ===
Short title	Citation	Royal assent
Long title
Ministry of Health Provisional Order Confirmation (Maidstone Extension) Act 1932 (repealed)	22 & 23 Geo. 5. c. iii	29 February 1932
An Act to confirm a Provisional Order of the Minister of Health relating to the borough of Maidstone. (Repealed by County of Kent Act 1981 (c. xviii))
	Maidstone Extension Order 1931 (Note: Although passed in 1932, the short title is specified as the Maidstone Extension Order 1931.) Provisional Order extending a borough.	
Ministry of Health Provisional Order Confirmation (Sittingbourne and Milton) Act 1932	22 & 23 Geo. 5. c. iv	29 February 1932
An Act to confirm a Provisional Order of the Minister of Health relating to Sittingbourne and Milton.
	Sittingbourne and Milton Order 1931 (Note: Although passed in 1932, the short title is specified as the Sittingbourne and Milton Order 1931.) Provisional Order repealing a local Act (Note: Milton next Sittingbourne Improvement Act 1838 (1 & 2 Vict. c. ii)) and repealing or amending certain confirmation Acts.	
Sea Fisheries (Swansea) Order Confirmation Act 1932	22 & 23 Geo. 5. c. v	17 March 1932
An Act to confirm a Provisional Order made by the Minister of Agriculture and Fisheries under the Sea Fisheries Act 1868 (Note: Sea Fisheries Act 1868 (31 & 32 Vict. c. 45)) for the regulation of an Oyster and Mussel Fishery in certain parts of the sea adjoining the county of Glamorgan.
	Swansea Fishery Order 1931 (Note: Although passed in 1932, the short title is specified as the Swansea Fishery Order 1931.) Order for the Regulation of an Oyster and Mussel Fishery in certain parts of the sea adjoining the county of Glamorgan.	
Worksop Corporation Act 1932 (repealed)	22 & 23 Geo. 5. c. vi	17 March 1932
An Act to make provision with regard to the audit of the accounts of the mayor aldermen and burgesses of the borough of Worksop and their officers and for other purposes. (Repealed by Nottinghamshire County Council Act 1985 (c. xv))
Edinburgh Corporation Order Confirmation Act 1932	22 & 23 Geo. 5. c. vii	25 April 1932
An Act to confirm a Provisional Order under the Private Legislation Procedure (Scotland) Act 1899 (Note: Private Legislation Procedure (Scotland) Act 1899 (62 & 63 Vict. c. 47)) relating to Edinburgh Corporation.
	Edinburgh Order 1932 Provisional Order to consolidate with amendments the Acts and Orders of or relating to the transport and gas undertakings of the Corporation of the city and royal burgh of Edinburgh and the borrowing rating and assessing powers of the Corporation to confer further powers upon the Corporation in respect of these matters to transfer to the Corporation part of the tramway undertaking of the Musselburgh and District Electric Light and Traction Company Limited to make further provision for the local government and improvement of the city to make provision with reference to the registration districts of the city under the Registration of Births Deaths and Marriages (Scotland) Acts and for other purposes.	
Edinburgh Corporation (Sheriff Court House, &c.) Order Confirmation Act 1932 (repealed)	22 & 23 Geo. 5. c. viii	25 April 1932
An Act to confirm a Provisional Order under the Private Legislation Procedure (Scotland) Act 1899 relating to Edinburgh Corporation (Sheriff Court House &c.). (Repealed by Edinburgh Corporation Order Confirmation Act 1964 (c. xli))
	Edinburgh Corporation (Sheriff Court House, &c.) Order 1932 Provisional Order to authorise the Corporation of the city and royal burgh of Edinburgh to acquire lands for a new sheriff court house and street improvement purposes to construct a street improvement to enact provisions in reference to the Edinburgh Sheriff Court House Commissioners to borrow money and for other purposes.	
Ministry of Health Provisional Order Confirmation (Margate and Yeovil) Act 1932	22 & 23 Geo. 5. c. ix	28 April 1932
An Act to confirm certain Provisional Orders of the Minister of Health relating to Margate and Yeovil.
	Margate Order 1932 Provisional Order for amending the Margate Corporation Act 1908. (Note: Margate Corporation Act 1908 (8 Edw. 7. c. lxxxvii))	
	Yeovil Order 1932 Provisional Order partially repealing and amending a local Act. (Note: Borough of Yeovil Extension and Improvement Act 1854 (17 & 18 Vict. c. cxxv))	
Provisional Orders (Marriages) Confirmation Act 1932 (repealed)	22 & 23 Geo. 5. c. x	12 May 1932
An Act to confirm certain Provisional Orders made by one of His Majesty's Principal Secretaries of State under the Marriages Validity (Provisional Orders) Acts 1905 (Note: Provisional Order (Marriages) Act 1905 (5 Edw. 7. c. 23)) and 1924. (Note: Marriages Validity (Provisional Orders) Act 1924 (14 & 15 Geo. 5. c. 20)) (Repealed by Statute Law (Repeals) Act 1977 (c. 18))
	Saints Cosmus and Damnian Challock Order.	
	Saint James Pokesdown Order.	
Rochdale Corporation Act 1932	22 & 23 Geo. 5. c. xi	12 May 1932
An Act to authorise the abandonment of certain light railways and tramways in and near Rochdale to make better provision for the health local government and finance of the borough of Rochdale and for other purposes.
South Wales Electric Power Act 1932	22 & 23 Geo. 5. c. xii	12 May 1932
An Act to confer further powers on the South Wales Electrical Power Distribution Company to change their name to reorganise increase define and regulate their capital and borrowing powers and for other purposes.
Walthamstow Corporation Act 1932 (repealed)	22 & 23 Geo. 5. c. xiii	12 May 1932
An Ac to make provision for the regulation of street trading in the borough of Walthamstow and for other purposes. (Repealed by Walthamstow Corporation Act 1956 (4 & 5 Eliz. 2. c. lxxxiv))
York Waterworks Act 1932	22 & 23 Geo. 5. c. xiv	12 May 1932
An Act to provide for the conversion and consolidation of the existing ordinary capital and of the existing preference capital of the York Waterworks Company to authorise the Company to raise additional capital to confer further powers upon the Company and for other purposes.
Sheffield Corporation Act 1932 (repealed)	22 & 23 Geo. 5. c. xv	12 May 1932
An Act to authorise the Corporation of the city of Sheffield to construct street improvements to amalgamate the townships and parishes within the city and for other purposes. (Repealed by Statute Law (Repeals) Act 1989 (c. 43))
London Local Authorities (Superannuation) Temporary Provisions Act 1932 (repealed)	22 & 23 Geo. 5. c. xvi	12 May 1932
An Act to authorise the making of temporary modifications of enactments schemes regulations order and agreements relating to the payment of superannuation and other allowances by the London County Council and the councils of metropolitan boroughs and for other purposes. (Repealed by Local Law (Greater London Council and Inner London Boroughs) Order 1965 (SI 1965/540))
Goldsmiths' Consolidated Charities Scheme Confirmation Act 1932 (repealed)	22 & 23 Geo. 5. c. xvii	16 June 1932
An Act to confirm a Scheme of the Charity Commissioners for the application or management of the charities called the Goldsmiths' Consolidated Charities. (Repealed by Statute Law (Repeals) Act 2013 (c. 2))
	Scheme for the application or management of the charities called the Goldsmiths' Consolidated Charities under the management of the Goldsmith's Company of the City of London and regulated by a Scheme of the Charity Commissioners of the 15th March 1918.	
Ford Street Charity Scheme Confirmation Act 1932 (repealed)	22 & 23 Geo. 5. c. xviii	16 June 1932
An Act to confirm a Scheme of the Charity Commissioners for the application or management of the charity known as the Ford Street Charity in the ancient parish of Tavistock in the county of Devon. (Repealed by Statute Law (Repeals) Act 2013 (c. 2))
	Scheme for the application or management of the charity known as the Ford Street Charity in the ancient parish of Tavistock in the County of Devon regulated by an Act of Parliament 3 Geo. III c. 27 (private) (Note: Duke of Bedford's Estate Act 1763 (3 Geo. 3. c. 27 Pr.)) and comprised in an Order made by the Charity Commissioners on the 23rd March 1900 under the Local Government Act 1894 (Note: Local Government Act 1894 (56 & 57 Vict. c. 73)) s. 14 (3).	
Maidstone Bread Charities Scheme Confirmation Act 1932	22 & 23 Geo. 5. c. xix	16 June 1932
An Act to confirm a Scheme of the Charity Commissioners for the application or management of the charities collectively known as the Bread Charities in the ancient parish of Maidstone in the county of Kent.
	Scheme for the application or management of the following Charities collectively known as the Bread Charities in the Ancient Parish of Maidstone in the County of Kent:—: 1. The Charity of William Hewett founded by Indenture dated 8th January 1567; 2. The Charity of Sir Henry Cutts founded in the year 1602; 3. The Charity known as the Bread Charity otherwise known as the Charity of an Unknown Donor; 4. The Charity known as Bell's and Rose's Charity founded prior to the year 1800; 5. The Charity of Peter Pope founded in the year 1809; 6. The Charity called an Easter Offering from Friends of the Poor regulated by a Declaration of Trust dated 25th November 1891.	
Epsom College Scheme Confirmation Act 1932 (repealed)	22 & 23 Geo. 5. c. xx	16 June 1932
An Act to confirm a Scheme of the Charity Commissioners and of the Board of Education for the application or management of the charity or foundation called Epsom College at Epsom in the County of Surrey. (Repealed by Charities (Royal Medical Foundation of Epsom College) Order 2000 (SI 2000/1639))
	Scheme for the application or management of the charity or foundation called Epsom College formerly the Royal Medical Benevolent College at Epsom in the County of Surrey regulated by the Act of Parliament 18 & 19 Vict. c. clxvi (Note: Royal Medical Benevolent College Act 1855 (18 & 19 Vict. c. clxvi)) and the Royal Medical Benevolent College Act 1894. (Note: Royal Medical Benevolent College Act 1894 (57 & 58 Vict. c. x))	
Church of Scotland Trust Order Confirmation Act 1932	22 & 23 Geo. 5. c. xxi	16 June 1932
An Act to confirm a Provisional Order under the Private Legislation Procedure (Scotland) Act 1899 relating to the Church of Scotland Trust.
	Church of Scotland Trust Order 1932 Provisional Order to incorporate the Church of Scotland Trust to vest in the Trust certain heritable properties and investments belonging to the Church and for other purposes.	
St. Andrews Links Order Confirmation Act 1932 (repealed)	22 & 23 Geo. 5. c. xxii	16 June 1932
An Act to confirm a Provisional Order under the Private Legislation Procedure (Scotland) Act 1899 relating to St. Andrews Links and adjoining lands. (Repealed by Statute Law (Repeals) Act 1998 (c. 43))
	St. Andrews Links Order 1932 Provisional Order to confer further powers on the provost magistrates and councillors of the burgh of St. Andrews in reference to the Links of St. Andrews and adjoining lands and for other purposes.	
Coatbridge Drainage Order Confirmation Act 1932	22 & 23 Geo. 5. c. xxiii	16 June 1932
An Act to confirm a Provisional Order under the Private Legislation Procedure (Scotland) Act 1899 relating to Coatbridge Drainage.
	Coatbridge Drainage Order 1932 Provisional Order to authorise the Coatbridge Town Council to borrow further moneys for the purposes of their sewerage and drainage undertaking and for other purposes.	
Glasgow Corporation Order Confirmation Act 1932	22 & 23 Geo. 5. c. xxiv	16 June 1932
An Act to confirm a Provisional Order under the Private Legislation Procedure (Scotland) Act 1899 relating to Glasgow Corporation.
	Glasgow Corporation Order 1932 Provisional Order to authorise the Corporation of the city of Glasgow to borrow further moneys for the purposes of their parks tramway and water undertakings to increase the amount which they are authorised to expend on musical entertainments to extend the time for compulsory purchase of lands for the construction of works authorised by the Glasgow Corporation Order 1927 and for other purposes.	
Ministry of Health Provisional Orders Confirmation (Lindsey and Lincoln Joint Smallpox Hospital and Wandle Valley Joint Sewerage District) Act 1932	22 & 23 Geo. 5. c. xxv	16 June 1932
An Act to confirm certain Provisional Orders of the Minister of Health relating to Lindsey and Lincoln Joint Smallpox Hospital and Wandle Valley Joint Sewerage District.
	Lindsey and Lincoln Joint Smallpox Hospital Order 1932 Provisional Order forming a united district under section 279 of the Public Health Act 1875. (Note: Public Health Act 1875 (38 & 39 Vict. c. 55))	
	Wandle Valley Joint Sewerage Order 1932 Provisional Order amending a confirmation Act. (Note: Local Government Board's Provisional Orders Confirmation (No. 5) Act 1916 (6 & 7 Geo. 5. c. xxxv))	
Ministry of Health Provisional Order Confirmation (Northampton) Act 1932 (repealed)	22 & 23 Geo. 5. c. xxvi	16 June 1932
An Act to confirm a Provisional Order of the Minister of Health relating to the borough of Northampton. (Repealed by Northampton Act 1988 (c. xxix))
	Northampton Order 1932 Provisional Order altering certain local Acts.	
Ministry of Health Provisional Order Confirmation (Derby and Stalybridge Hyde Mossley and Duckinfield Tramways and Electricity Board) Act 1932	22 & 23 Geo. 5. c. xxvii	16 June 1932
An Act to confirm certain Provisional Orders of the Minister of Health relating to Derby and Stalybridge Hyde Mossley and Duckinfield Tramways and Electricity Board.
	Derby Order 1932 Provisional Order altering the Derby Corporation Act 1929. (Note: Derby Corporation Act 1929 (20 & 21 Geo. 5. c. xxiii))	
	Stalybridge Hyde Mossley and Duckinfield Tramways and Electricity Board Order 1932 Provisional Order altering a local Act. (Note: Stalybridge, Hyde, Mossley and Dukingield Tramways and Electricity Board Act 1901 (1 Edw. 7. c. cxcv))	
South Staffordshire Water Act 1932	22 & 23 Geo. 5. c. xxviii	16 June 1932
An Act to authorise the South Staffordshire Waterworks Company to construct new works and to raise additional capital to extend the limits of supply of the Company and for other purposes.
Blackpool Improvement Act 1932	22 & 23 Geo. 5. c. xxix	16 June 1932
An Act to provide for carrying into effect agreements between Blackpool Pleasure Beach Limited and the mayor aldermen and burgesses of the borough of Blackpool to make further provision in regard to the erection of buildings and for other purposes.
Bridgwater Corporation Act 1932	22 & 23 Geo. 5. c. xxx	16 June 1932
An Act to authorise the mayor aldermen and burgesses of the borough of Bridgwater to abandon certain waterworks authorised by the Bridgwater Corporation Act 1928 (Note: Bridgwater Corporation Act 1928 (18 & 19 Geo. 5. c. cvi)) and to construct new waterworks and for other purposes.
Rhyl Urban District Council Act 1932	22 & 23 Geo. 5. c. xxxi	16 June 1932
An Act to authorise the Rhyl Urban District Council to construct new waterworks to confer upon the Council further powers in regard to their water undertaking and for other purposes.
North-Eastern Electric Supply Act 1932	22 & 23 Geo. 5. c. xxxii	16 June 1932
An Act to provide for the transfer to the Newcastle-upon-Tyne Electric Supply Company Limited of the undertakings of certain other companies to change the name of and to confer further powers upon that company and for other purposes.
Dagenham Trading Estate Act 1932	22 & 23 Geo. 5. c. xxxiii	16 June 1932
An Act for the regulation of certain roads on the Dagenham Trading Estate and for other purposes.
Scarborough Gas Act 1932	22 & 23 Geo. 5. c. xxxiv	16 June 1932
An Act to confer further powers upon the Scarborough Gas Company and for other purposes.
Cambridge Corporation Act 1932 (repealed)	22 & 23 Geo. 5. c. xxxv	16 June 1932
An Act to authorise the mayor aldermen and burgesses of the borough of Cambridge to acquire lands for the extension and improvement of the Guildhall to confer further powers upon the Corporation with regard to certain recreation grounds commons and open spaces in the borough and the health local government and improvement thereof to enlarge the powers of the conservators of the river Cam and for other purposes. (Repealed by Cambridge City Council Act 1985 (c. xl))
Welwyn Garden City Urban District Council Act 1932	22 & 23 Geo. 5. c. xxxvi	16 June 1932
An Act to provide for the acquisition by the Welwyn Garden City Urban District Council of the water undertaking of Welwyn Garden City, Limited; to authorise the council to supply water and to make further and better provision for the health, local government, and finance of the district, and for other purposes.
Thames Conservancy Act 1932	22 & 23 Geo. 5. c. xxxvii	16 June 1932
An Act to consolidate and amend the enactments relating to the powers and duties of the Conservators of the River Thames with respect to the conservancy preservation and regulation of the Thames above the landward limit of the Port of London.
Port of London (Various Powers) Act 1932 (repealed)	22 & 23 Geo. 5. c. xxxviii	16 June 1932
An Act to empower the Port of London Authority to acquire lands and to borrow further moneys, and for other purposes. (Repealed by Port of London Act 1968 (c. xxxii))
Royal Society for the Prevention of Cruelty to Animals Act 1932	22 & 23 Geo. 5. c. xxxix	16 June 1932
An Act to incorporate and confer powers upon the Royal Society for the Prevention of Cruelty to Animals.
Public Works Facilities Scheme (Shrewsbury Corporation) Confirmation Act 1932	22 & 23 Geo. 5. c. xl	12 July 1932
An Act to confirm a Scheme made by the Minister of Health under the Public Works Facilities Act, 1930, (Note: Public Works Facilities Act 1930 (20 & 21 Geo. 5. c. 50)) relating to the Shrewsbury Corporation.
	Shrewsbury Corporation (Water) Scheme.	
London, Midland and Scottish Railway Order Confirmation Act 1932	22 & 23 Geo. 5. c. xli	12 July 1932
An Act to confirm a Provisional Order under the Private Legislation Procedure (Scotland) Act, 1899, relating to the London, Midland and Scottish Railway.
	London, Midland and Scottish Railway Order 1932	
London and North Eastern Railway Order Confirmation Act 1932	22 & 23 Geo. 5. c. xlii	12 July 1932
An Act to confirm a Provisional Order under the Private Legislation Procedure (Scotland) Act, 1899, relating to the London and North Eastern Railway.
	London and North Eastern Railway Order 1932	
Grangemouth and Stirling Water Order Confirmation Act 1932	22 & 23 Geo. 5. c. xliii	12 July 1932
An Act to confirm a Provisional Order under the Private Legislation Procedure (Scotland) Act, 1899, relating to Grangemouth and Stirling Water.
	Grangemouth and Stirling Water Order 1932	
Leven Burgh Extension Order Confirmation Act 1932	22 & 23 Geo. 5. c. xliv	12 July 1932
An Act to confirm a Provisional Order under the Private Legislation Procedure (Scotland) Act, 1899, relating to Leven Burgh Extension.
	Leven Burgh Extension Order 1932	
Kilmarnock Gas Order Confirmation Act 1932	22 & 23 Geo. 5. c. xlv	12 July 1932
An Act to confirm a Provisional Order under the Burgh Police (Scotland) Act, 1892, (Note: Burgh Police (Scotland) Act 1892 (55 & 56 Vict. c. 55)) relating to Kilmarnock Gas.
	Kilmarnock Gas Order 1932	
Dundee Corporation Order Confirmation Act 1932 (repealed)	22 & 23 Geo. 5. c. xlvi	12 July 1932
An Act to confirm a Provisional Order under the Private Legislation Procedure (Scotland) Act, 1899, relating to Dundee Corporation. (Repealed by Dundee Corporation (Consolidated Powers) Order Confirmation Act 1957 (6 & 7 Eliz. 2. c. iv))
	Dundee Corporation Order 1932	
Provisional Order (Marriages) Confirmation (No. 2) Act 1932 (repealed)	22 & 23 Geo. 5. c. xlvii	12 July 1932
An Act to confirm certain Provisional Orders made by one of His Majesty's Principal Secretaries of State under the Marriages Validity (Provisional Orders) Acts 1905 and 1924. (Repealed by Statute Law (Repeals) Act 1977 (c. 18))
Newcastle-upon-Tyne Fire Brigade Provisional Order Confirmation Act 1932 (repealed)	22 & 23 Geo. 5. c. xlviii	12 July 1932
An Act to confirm a Provisional Order made by one of His Majesty's Principal Secretaries of State under section thirty-two of the Police Pensions Act, 1921, (Note: Police Pensions Act 1921 (11 & 12 Geo. 5. c. 31)) modifying the provisions of Part XII. of the Newcastle-upon-Tyne Improvement Act, 1892, (Note: Newcastle-upon-Tyne Improvement Act 1892 (55 & 56 Vict. c. ccxxxvi)) in respect of the pensions, allowances, and gratuities payable to members of the permanent fire brigade of the city of Newcastle-upon-Tyne, their widows, children, and dependants. (Repealed by Tyne and Wear Act 1980 (c. xliii))
London United Tramways (Trolley Vehicles) Order Confirmation Act 1932	22 & 23 Geo. 5. c. xlix	12 July 1932
An Act to confirm a Provisional Order made by the Minister of Transport under the London United Tramways Act, 1930, (Note: London United Tramways Act 1930 (20 & 21 Geo. 5. c. clxxxvii)) relating to the London United Tramways, Limited, Trolley Vehicles.
	London United Tramways (Trolley Vehicles) Order 1932	
South Lancashire Transport Company (Trolley Vehicles) Order Confirmation Act 1932 (repealed)	22 & 23 Geo. 5. c. l	12 July 1932
An Act to confirm a Provisional Order made by the Minister of Transport under the South Lancashire Transport Act, 1929, (Note: South Lancashire Transport Act 1929 (19 & 20 Geo. 5. c. lxxxiii)) relating to South Lancashire Transport Company Trolley Vehicles. (Repealed by South Lancashire Transport Act 1958 (6 & 7 Eliz. 2. c. xxxiii))
	South Lancashire Transport Company (Trolley Vehicles) Order 1932	
Sea Fisheries (Lynn Deeps and Lynn) Orders Confirmation Act 1932	22 & 23 Geo. 5. c. li	12 July 1932
An Act to confirm certain Provisional Orders made by the Minister of Agriculture and Fisheries under the Sea Fisheries Act, 1868, for the regulation of an oyster and mussel fishery and the establishment and maintenance of a several mussel fishery in the estuary of the Wash, in the county of Norfolk.
	Lynn Deeps Fishery Order 1932	
	Lynn Several Fishery Order 1932	
Ministry of Health Provisional Orders Confirmation (Abergavenny and Newcastle-upon-Tyne) Act 1932	22 & 23 Geo. 5. c. lii	12 July 1932
An Act to Confirm certain Provisional Orders of the Minister of Health relating to Abergavenny and Newcastle-upon-Tyne.
	Abergavenny (Water) Order 1932	
	Newcastle-upon-Tyne Order 1932	
Ministry of Health Provisional Orders Confirmation (Bridlington and Wells) Act 1932	22 & 23 Geo. 5. c. liii	12 July 1932
An Act to Confirm certain Provisional Orders of the Minister of Health relating to Bridlington and Wells.
	Bridlington Order 1932	
	City of Wells (Water) Order 1932	
Ministry of Health Provisional Order Confirmation (Leyton) Act 1932 (repealed)	22 & 23 Geo. 5. c. liv	12 July 1932
An Act to Confirm a Provisional Order of the Minister of Health relating to the borough of Leyton. (Repealed by Local Law (North East London Boroughs) Order 1965 (SI 1965/510))
	Leyton Order 1932	
Ministry of Health Provisional Order Confirmation (Oxford) Act 1932	22 & 23 Geo. 5. c. lv	12 July 1932
An Act to Confirm a Provisional Order of the Minister of Health relating to the city of Oxford.
	Oxford (Water) Order 1932	
Ministry of Health Provisional Order Confirmation (Paignton) Act 1932 (repealed)	22 & 23 Geo. 5. c. lvi	12 July 1932
An Act to Confirm a Provisional Order of the Minister of Health relating to the urban district of Paignton. (Repealed by Torbay Corporation Act 1971 (c. xxxiii))
	Paignton Order 1932	
Ministry of Health Provisional Order Confirmation (River Dee) Act 1932	22 & 23 Geo. 5. c. lvii	12 July 1932
An Act to Confirm a Provisional Order of the Minister of Health relating to the River Dee.
	River Dee Joint Committee Order 1932	
Ministry of Health Provisional Order Confirmation (Hertford) Act 1932	22 & 23 Geo. 5. c. lviii	12 July 1932
An Act to Confirm a Provisional Order of the Minister of Health relating to the borough of Hertford.
	Hertford Order 1932	
Ministry of Health Provisional Order Confirmation (Watford) Act 1932	22 & 23 Geo. 5. c. lix	12 July 1932
An Act to Confirm a Provisional Order of the Minister of Health relating to the borough of Watford.
	Watford Order 1932	
Ministry of Health Provisional Orders Confirmation (Eltham Valley Water and Herts and Essex Water) Act 1932	22 & 23 Geo. 5. c. lx	12 July 1932
An Act to Confirm certain Provisional Orders of the Minister of Health relating to Eltham Valley Water and Herts and Essex Water.
	Eltham Valley Water Order 1932	
	Herts and Essex Water Order 1932	
Ministry of Health Provisional Order Confirmation (Hailsham Water) Act 1932	22 & 23 Geo. 5. c. lxi	12 July 1932
An Act to Confirm a Provisional Order of the Minister of Health relating to Hailsham Water.
	Hailsham Water Order 1932	
Ministry of Health Provisional Order Confirmation (Henley-on-Thames Water) Act 1932	22 & 23 Geo. 5. c. lxii	12 July 1932
An Act to Confirm a Provisional Order of the Minister of Health relating to Henley-on-Thames Water.
	Henley-on-Thames Water Order 1932	
Kettering Gas Act 1932	22 & 23 Geo. 5. c. lxiii	12 July 1932
An Act to confer further powers upon the Kettering Gas Company; to prohibit the making by the Kettering Urban District Council of conditions as to the form of light, heat, power, or energy to be supplied or used in certain cases, and for other purposes.
Kendal Corn Rent Act 1932	22 & 23 Geo. 5. c. lxiv	12 July 1932
An Act to amend the law relating to the annual corn rent payable to the rectors and vicar of the parish of Kendal otherwise Kirkby Kendal in the county of Westmorland and for other purposes.
North Metropolitan Electric Power Supply Act 1932	22 & 23 Geo. 5. c. lxv	12 July 1932
An Act to confer further powers on the North Metropolitan Electric Power Supply Company, and for other purposes.
Commercial Gas Act 1932	22 & 23 Geo. 5. c. lxvi	12 July 1932
An Act to confer further powers on the Commercial Gas Company.
Oakham Gas and Electricity Act 1932	22 & 23 Geo. 5. c. lxvii	12 July 1932
An Act to confer further powers on the Oakham Gas and Electricity Company, Limited, and for other purposes.
Sidmouth Water Act 1932	22 & 23 Geo. 5. c. lxviii	12 July 1932
An Act for extending the limits of supply of the Sidmouth Water Company; for sanctioning and confirming the construction of existing works; for authorising the construction of new works by and for conferring further powers upon that Company, and for other purposes.
Bury Corporation Act 1932	22 & 23 Geo. 5. c. lxix	12 July 1932
An Act to extend the boundaries of the County Borough of Bury; to confer further powers upon the Mayor, Aldermen, and Burgesses of that Borough with regard to their road transport, gas, and electricity undertakings, and the health, local government, and improvement of the Borough, and for other purposes.
London County Council (General Powers) Act 1932	22 & 23 Geo. 5. c. lxx	12 July 1932
An Act to confer further powers upon the London County Council and other authorities and for other purposes.
Hove Pier Act 1932	22 & 23 Geo. 5. c. lxxi	12 July 1932
An Act to empower the Hove Pier Theatre and Kursaal Company Limited to construct a pier at Hove in the county of Sussex and for other purposes.
London County Council (Money) Act 1932 (repealed)	22 & 23 Geo. 5. c. lxxii	12 July 1932
An Act to regulate the expenditure on capital account and lending of money by the London County Council during the financial period from the first day of April one thousand nine hundred and thirty-two to the thirtieth day of September one thousand nine hundred and thirty-three and for other purposes. (Repealed by London County Council (Loans) Act 1955 (4 & 5 Eliz. 2. c. xxvi))
Southern Railway Act 1932	22 & 23 Geo. 5. c. lxxiii	12 July 1932
An Act to empower the Southern Railway Company to construct works and acquire lands to extend the time for the completion of a railway and the compulsory purchase of certain land and for other purposes.
Trent Navigation Act 1932	22 & 23 Geo. 5. c. lxxiv	12 July 1932
An Act to confer further powers on the Trent Navigation Company to make further provision with respect to the rates tolls and charges applicable to the Trent Navigation and the Newark Navigation and for other purposes.
Mid-Southern Utility Act 1932	22 & 23 Geo. 5. c. lxxv	12 July 1932
An Act to change the name of the Mid Southern District Utility Company to confer further powers on that Company and for other purposes.
Weston-super-Mare Grand Pier Act 1932	22 & 23 Geo. 5. c. lxxvi	12 July 1932
An Act to confirm the construction of widenings of the existing pier and to authorise the construction of a work in and adjoining the urban district of Weston-super-Mare in the county of Somerset and for other purposes.
Gateshead Extension Act 1932 (repealed)	22 & 23 Geo. 5. c. lxxvii	12 July 1932
An Act to extend the boundaries of the borough of Gateshead and for other purposes. (Repealed by Tyne & Wear Act 1980 (c. xliii))
Wokingham District Water Act 1932 (repealed)	22 & 23 Geo. 5. c. lxxviii	12 July 1932
An Act to confer additional powers upon the Wokingham District Water Company Limited and for other purposes. (Repealed by Mid-Wessex Water (No. 2) Order 1957 (SI 1957/2233))
Southern Suburban Gas Act 1932	22 & 23 Geo. 5. c. lxxix	12 July 1932
An Act to provide for the transfer to the South Suburban Gas Company of the undertakings of the Sevenoaks Gas Company and the Tonbridge Gas Company and for other purposes.
Nottingham Corporation Act 1932 (repealed)	22 & 23 Geo. 5. c. lxxx	12 July 1932
An Act to extend the boundaries of the city of Nottingham and county of the same city to authorise the St. Catharine's parochial church council to build upon St. Catharine's Cemetery in the city and for other purposes. (Repealed by Statute Law (Repeals) Act 1995 (c. 44))
Birkenhead Corporation Act 1932	22 & 23 Geo. 5. c. lxxxi	12 July 1932
An Act to provide for the extension of the limits for the supply of water and electricity by the corporation of Birkenhead and for other purposes.
Gas Light and Coke Company's Act 1932	22 & 23 Geo. 5. c. lxxxii	12 July 1932
An Act to extend the limits of supply of the Gas Light and Coke Company to empower that company to execute certain works and to acquire certain lands to confer various powers upon that company and for other purposes.
South Metropolitan Gas Act 1932	22 & 23 Geo. 5. c. lxxxiii	12 July 1932
An Act to increase the capital powers of the South Metropolitan Gas Company and for other purposes.
Chester Corporation Act 1932	22 & 23 Geo. 5. c. lxxxiv	12 July 1932
An Act to authorise the transfer of the undertaking of the Chester General Cemetery Company to the mayor aldermen and citizens of the city and county of the city of Chester to make further provision as to the reception and disposal by the said mayor aldermen and citizens of sewage from areas adjacent to the city and for other purposes.
Metropolitan Water Board Act 1932	22 & 23 Geo. 5. c. lxxxv	12 July 1932
An Act to transfer to the Metropolitan Water Board communication pipes or parts thereof under streets to confer various powers upon the said Board and for other purposes.
Lindsey County Council (Sandhills) Act 1932	22 & 23 Geo. 5. c. lxxxvi	12 July 1932
An Act for regulating certain lands in the Parts of Lindsey Lincolnshire known as the Sandhills to confer powers upon the county council of the said Parts of Lindsey with reference thereto and for other purposes.
Chesterfield and Bolsover Water Act 1932	22 & 23 Geo. 5. c. lxxxvii	12 July 1932
An Act to constitute a joint board comprising representatives of the Chesterfield Corporation and the Bolsover Urban District Council and to vest in the said Board the water undertakings of the constituent authorities to authorise the Board to execute works and supply water and for other purposes.
Warrington Extension Act 1932 (repealed)	22 & 23 Geo. 5. c. lxxxviii	12 July 1932
An Act to extend the boundaries of the county borough of Warrington and for purposes incidental thereto. (Repealed by Cheshire County Council Act 1980 (c. xiii))
Bournemouth, Poole and Christchurch Electricity Act 1932	22 & 23 Geo. 5. c. lxxxix	12 July 1932
An Act to postpone and synchronise the dates of purchase of certain undertakings carried on by the Bournemouth and Poole Electricity Supply Company Limited to provide for those undertakings being purchasable together and to make consequential provision with regard thereto to regulate the charges to be made by the Company and for other purposes.
Wolverhampton Corporation Act 1932 (repealed)	22 & 23 Geo. 5. c. xc	12 July 1932
An Act to alter the boundaries of the borough of Wolverhampton to confer further powers upon the mayor aldermen and burgesses of that borough with regard to the provision and working of trolley vehicles to authorise them to construct street works and to acquire lands for those and other purposes to extend the area for the supply of water by the Corporation and to make further provision with regard to their water and electricity undertakings and the health local government and improvement of the borough and for other purposes. (Repealed by Wolverhampton Corporation Act 1969 (c. lx))
Falkirk and District Traction Order Confirmation Act 1932	22 & 23 Geo. 5. c. xci	15 November 1932
An Act to confirm a Provisional Order under the Private Legislation Procedure (Scotland) Act 1899 relating to Falkirk and District Traction.
	Falkirk District Traction Order 1932 Provisional Order to provide for the conversion of the existing shares in the capital of the Falkirk and District Traction Company and for other purposes.	
Edinburgh Royal Maternity and Simpson Memorial Hospital Order Confirmation Act 1932	22 & 23 Geo. 5. c. xcii	15 November 1932
An Act to confirm a Provisional Order under the Private Legislation Procedure (Scotland) Act 1899 relating to Edinburgh Royal Maternity and Simpson Memorial Hospital.
	Edinburgh Royal Maternity and Simpson Memorial Hospital Order 1932 Provisional Order to transfer the Edinburgh Royal Maternity and Simpson Memorial Hospital to the Royal Infirmary of Edinburgh and for other purposes.	
Macduff Harbour Order Confirmation Act 1932 (repealed)	22 & 23 Geo. 5. c. xciii	15 November 1932
An Act to confirm a Provisional Order under the Private Legislation Procedure (Scotland) Act 1899 relating to Macduff Harbour. (Repealed by Grampian Regional Council (Harbours) Order Confirmation Act 1987 (c. x))
	Macduff Harbour Order 1932 Provisional Order to authorise the provost magistrates and town council of the burgh of Macduff to levy an assessment on the occupiers of lands and premises in the burgh for the purposes of the Macduff Harbour Acts 1847 to 1912 and for other purposes.	
Aberdeen Harbour Order Confirmation Act 1932 (repealed)	22 & 23 Geo. 5. c. xciv	15 November 1932
An Act to confirm a Provisional Order under the Private Legislation Procedure (Scotland) Act 1899 relating to Aberdeen Harbour. (Repealed by Aberdeen Harbour Order Confirmation Act 1960 (9 & 10 Eliz. 2. c. i))
	Aberdeen Harbour Order 1932 Provisional Order to extend the period of duration of the Aberdeen Harbour Acts 1895 to 1924 and for other purposes.	
Dunfermline and District Traction Order Confirmation Act 1932	22 & 23 Geo. 5. c. xcv	17 November 1932
An Act to confirm a Provisional Order under the Private Legislation Procedure (Scotland) Act 1899 relating to Dunfermline and District Traction.
	Dunfermline and District Traction Order 1932 Provisional Order to provide for the conversion of the existing shares in the capital of the Dunfermline and District Traction Company and for other purposes.	
Portsoy Harbour Order Confirmation Act 1932 (repealed)	22 & 23 Geo. 5. c. xcvi	17 November 1932
An Act to confirm a Provisional Order under the Private Legislation Procedure (Scotland) Act 1899 relating to Portsoy Harbour. (Repealed by Grampian Regional Council (Harbours) Order Confirmation Act 1987 (c. x))
	Portsoy Harbour Order 1932 Provisional Order to transfer the harbour of Portsoy to the provost magistrates and councillors of the burgh of Portsoy and confer upon them powers with reference thereto to authorise the said provost magistrates and councillors to borrow money to provide for the application of moneys arising from the late Alexander Rainy's Bequest and for other purposes.	
Renfrew Burgh Order Confirmation Act 1932	22 & 23 Geo. 5. c. xcvii	17 November 1932
An Act to confirm a Provisional Order under the Private Legislation Procedure (Scotland) Act 1899 relating to Renfrew Burgh.
	Renfrew Burgh Order 1932 Provisional Order to authorise the provost magistrates and councillors of the royal burgh of Renfrew to acquire lands for road improvements and to borrow money therefor and for other purposes.	

== 23 & 24 Geo. 5 ==
The second session of the 36th Parliament of the United Kingdom, which met from 22 November 1932 until 17 November 1933.

This session was also traditionally cited as 23 & 24 G. 5.

=== Public general acts ===
Short title	Citation	Royal assent
Long title
Consolidated Fund (No. 1) Act 1932 (Session 2) (repealed)	23 & 24 Geo. 5. c. 1	22 December 1932
An Act to apply a sum out of the Consolidated Fund to the service of the year ending on the thirty-first day of March, one thousand nine hundred and thirty-three. (Repealed by Statute Law Revision Act 1950 (14 Geo. 6. c. 6))
Expiring Laws Continuance Act 1932 (repealed)	23 & 24 Geo. 5. c. 2	22 December 1932
An Act to continue certain expiring laws. (Repealed by Statute Law Revision Act 1950 (14 Geo. 6. c. 6))

=== Local acts ===
Short title	Citation	Royal assent
Long title
Public Works Facilities Scheme (Huddersfield Corporation) Confirmation Act 1932	23 & 24 Geo. 5. c. i	22 December 1932
An Act to confirm a Scheme made by the Minister of Transport under the Public Works Facilities Act 1930 (Note: Public Works Facilities Act 1930 (20 & 21 Geo. 5. c. 50)) relating to the Huddersfield Corporation.
	Huddersfield Corporation (Tramway and Trolley Vehicles) Scheme 1932 Scheme under the Public Works Facilities Act 1930 empowering the mayor aldermen and burgesses of the borough of Huddersfield to construct a tramway and to provide trolley vehicle routes and for other purposes.	

== See also ==
- List of acts of the Parliament of the United Kingdom
