= Enactment (British legal term) =

In the law of the United Kingdom, the term enactment may refer to the whole or part of a piece of legislation or to the whole or part of a legal instrument made under a piece of legislation. In Wakefield Light Railways Company v Wakefield Corporation, Ridley J. said:

The word "enactment" does not mean the same thing as "Act." "Act" means the whole Act, whereas a section or part of a section in an Act may be an enactment.

In Postmaster General v Birmingham Corporation, Roache LJ said "I am unable to accept the ingenious argument that the word 'enactment' in" section 7 of the Telegraph Act 1878 "refers to special or ad hoc enactments dealing with specific works and does not refer to general enactments . . . No such limitation upon the word "enactment" is expressed, and in my judgement none can or should be implied."

In Rathbone v Bundock, Ashworth J said that in "some contexts the word "enactment" may include within its meaning not only a statute but also a statutory regulation but, as it seems to me, the word does not have that wide meaning in" the Road Traffic Act 1960. "On the contrary, the language used in a number of instances strongly suggests that in this particular Act the draftsman was deliberately distinguishing between an enactment and a statutory regulation: see, for example, section 267 and Schedule 18."

See also R v Bakewell (1857) E & B 848 at 851, Burgh of Grangemouth v Stirlingshire and Falkirk Water Board, 1963, SLT 242, Allsop v North Tyneside Metropolitan Borough Council [1991] RVR 209, (1992) 156 LGR 1007, DC.

== Statutory definitions ==
In the Gas Undertakings Act 1929, unless the context otherwise required, the expression "enactment" included any public general act, any special act, and any provisional order confirmed by an act.

In the Local Government Act 1929, unless the context otherwise requires, the expression "enactment" includes any public general, local or private act and any rule, regulation, byelaw, order, or award made under any act.

In the Local Government Act 1933, unless the context otherwise required, the expression "enactment" included any enactment in a provisional order confirmed by Parliament.

In the Shops Act 1950, save where the context otherwise required, the expression "enactment" included any act, and any rule, regulation, bye-law or order made under any act.

See section 126(1) of the Magistrates' Courts Act 1952.

In the Education (Work Experience) Act 1973, the word "enactment" included any byelaw, regulation or other provision having effect under an enactment.

In section 31 of the Criminal Law Act 1977, the word "enactment" does not include an enactment contained in an order, regulation or other instrument made under an act. See also section 65(2).

In section 29 of the Unfair Contract Terms Act 1977, the expression "enactment" means any legislation (including subordinate legislation) of the United Kingdom or Northern Ireland and any instrument having effect by virtue of such legislation, and the expression "statutory" means conferred by an enactment.

In the Suppression of Terrorism Act 1978, the word "enactment" included an enactment of the Parliament of Northern Ireland, a measure of the Northern Ireland Assembly, and an Order in Council under the Northern Ireland (Temporary Provisions) Act 1972 or the Northern Ireland Act 1974.

In the Magistrates' Courts Act 1980, unless the context otherwise requires, the expression "enactment" includes an enactment contained in a local act or in any order, regulation or other instrument having effect by virtue of an act.

In the preceding provisions of the Supply of Goods and Services Act 1982 and in section 18 of that act, the word "enactment" means any legislation (including subordinate legislation) of the United Kingdom or Northern Ireland.

In the Channel Tunnel Act 1987, except where the context otherwise requires, the expression "enactment" includes an enactment contained in that act or in any act passed on or after the date on which that act was passed, and any subordinate legislation within the meaning of the Interpretation Act 1978.

In section 163 of the Finance Act 1998, the word "enactment" includes any enactment contained in that act (other than that section) and any enactment passed after that act.

In Part 2 of the Welfare Reform Act 2009, the expression "enactment" means an enactment contained in, or in an instrument made under—

- an act of Parliament,
- an act of the Scottish Parliament, or
- a measure or act of the National Assembly for Wales.

== Classification ==
Enactments may be classified as express or implied, as general or particular, as declaratory or amending, as substantive or procedural, as mandatory (also known as absolute, imperative, obligatory or strict) or directory (also known as permissive), as criminal or civil, and as penal or non-penal (and formerly as penal or remedial).
