= Sale of Gas (Scotland) Act 1864 =

Act of the Parliament of the United Kingdom

Sale of Gas (Scotland) Act 1864 (Note: The citation of this act by this short title was authorised by section 1 of, and the first schedule to, the Short Titles Act 1896. Due to the repeal of those provisions it is now authorised by section 19(2) of the Interpretation Act 1978.)
- Act of Parliament
- Parliament of the United Kingdom
- Long title: An Act to enable certain Royal and Parliamentary Burghs in Scotland to avail themselves of the Provisions of the Acts Twenty-second and Twenty-third Victoria, Chapter Sixty-six, and Twenty-third and Twenty-fourth Victoria, Chapter One hundred and forty-six, for regulating the Sale of Gas.
- Citation: 27 & 28 Vict. c. 96
- Territorial extent: United Kingdom

Dates
- Royal assent: 29 July 1864
- Commencement: 29 July 1864 (Note: The Acts of Parliament (Commencement) Act 1793.)
- Repealed: 1 May 1949 (Note: The Gas (Vesting Date) Order 1949 (SI 1949/392).)
Other legislation
Amends	Sale of Gas Act 1859; Sale of Gas Act 1860
Repealed by	Gas Act 1948

Status: Repealed

Text of statute as originally enacted

The Sales of Gas (Scotland) Act 1864 (27 & 28 Vict. c. 96) was an act of the Parliament of the United Kingdom that amended the law relating to the sales of gas in Scotland.

== Background ==
The Sale of Gas Act 1859 (22 & 23 Vict. c. 66) and the Sale of Gas Act 1860 (23 & 24 Vict. c. 146) had allowed Royal Burghs not being County Towns to avail themselves of the provisions of the acts. Certain Royal Burghs were not coextensive with Parliamentary boundaries and therefore the provisions would not apply to the whole district.

== Provisions ==
The act comprises a single section entitled: Magistrates of certain Burghs may apply to their district provisions of recited Acts.

== Subsequent ==
The whole act was repealed by section 76 of, and the fourth schedule to, the Gas Act 1948 (11 & 12 Geo. 6. c. 67), which came into force on 1 May 1949. The 1948 act nationalised the British gas industry.

== See also ==
- Oil and gas industry in the United Kingdom
