= David Milne-Watson =

Scottish industrialist

Sir David Milne-Watson (10 March 1869 – 3 October 1945) was a Scottish industrialist who served as managing director of the Gas Light and Coke Company between 1916 and 1945, and president of the National Gas Council of Great Britain and Ireland from 1919 to 1943.
