= Gas Undertakings Act 1934 =

Act of the Parliament of the United Kingdom

Gas Undertakings Act 1934 (Note: Section 36(1).)
- Act of Parliament
- Parliament of the United Kingdom
- Long title: An Act to amend the law with respect to gas undertakings.
- Citation: 24 & 25 Geo. 5. c. 28
- Territorial extent: England and Wales; Scotland; (Note: Section 36(2).)

Dates
- Royal assent: 28 June 1934
- Commencement: 1 October 1934 (generally) (Note: Section 36(3).); 1 January 1935 (various) (Note: Sections 12(1), 31(2) and 33(2).); 1 January 1939 (various) (Note: Sections 12(2), 31(3) and 33(3).)
- Repealed: 1 May 1949 (Note: The Gas (Vesting Date) Order 1949 (SI 1949/392).)
Other legislation
Amends	Gas Regulation Act 1920; Gas Undertakings Act 1929
Repeals/revokes	See § Repealed enactments
Repealed by	Gas Act 1948

Status: Repealed

Text of statute as originally enacted

The Gas Undertakings Act 1934 (24 & 25 Geo. 5. c. 28) was an act of the Parliament of the United Kingdom that amended the law relating to gas undertakings in Great Britain. Among other changes, it abolished the office of gas referees and transferred their functions to the Board of Trade.

== Background ==
The UK Board of Trade had established the National Fuel and Power Committee - known as the Wrottesley Committee - to inquire into the competitiveness of the gas industry in relation to the growing electricity industry. The committee’s second report (Command Paper 3252) and final report (Command Paper 4288) published in 1933, recommended amending and modernising the laws governing gas supply companies (undertakings). The 1934 Act enacted these recommendations. It gave undertakers the power to establish flexible pricing and allowed the averaging of gas calorific values, and regulated commissions. It also expanded the Board of Trade's oversight of the industry.

== Provisions ==
=== Repealed enactments ===
Section 33(1), (2) and (3) of the act repealed 6 enactments, listed in parts I, II and III of the third schedule to the act, respectively.

==== Part I: Enactments repealed as from commencement of act ====
Part I — Enactments repealed as from commencement of act
Citation	Short title	Extent of repeal
10 & 11 Geo. 5. c. 28	Gas Regulation Act 1920	Subsections (3) and (4) of section four; subsection (4) of section nine; in section eighteen the definition of the expression " quarter sessions ".
19 & 20 Geo. 5. c. 24	Gas Undertakings Act 1929	In subsections (1) and (2) of section three the words " raised by the undertakers on mortgage or by the creation and issue of debenture stock "; so much of the Schedule as amends section eighteen of the Gas Regulation Act 1920.

==== Part II: Enactments repealed as from 1 January 1935 ====
Part II — Enactments repealed as from 1 January 1935
Citation	Short title	Extent of repeal
10 & 11 Geo. 5. c. 28	Gas Regulation Act 1920	In subsection (1) of section four the words " The Board of Trade shall also appoint a competent and impartial person to be chief gas examiner " and the words " and the chief gas examiner "; subsection (1) of section six; in subsections (1) and (2) of section seven the words " the chief gas examiner and "; paragraphs (b) and (c) of the proviso to section eight; subsection (6) of section nine.

==== Part III: Enactments repealed as from 1 January 1939 ====
Part III — Enactments repealed as from 1 January 1939
Citation	Short title	Extent of repeal
34 & 35 Vict. c. 41	Gasworks Clauses Act 1871	In section twelve the words from " and such gas " to the end of the section; in section twenty-eight paragraph 2 and the words " and purity "; in sections twenty-nine and thirty the words " and purity "; in section thirty-three the words " or purity "; in section thirty-six the words " under such pressure as is prescribed " and " under less pressure " and " or of less purity "; in Schedule A paragraph 2 of Part I and paragraph II of Part II.
10 & 11 Geo. 5. c. 28	Gas Regulation Act 1920	Section four; subsection (1) and paragraphs (a) and (b) of subsection (2) of section seven.
19 & 20 Geo. 5. c. 24	Gas Undertakings Act 1929	So much of the Schedule as amends sections four, six and nine of the Gas Regulation Act 1920.

Section 33(3) of the act also repealed, as from 1 January 1939, such of the provisions of any enactment relating to undertakers as incorporated the provisions of the Gasworks Clauses Act 1871 that were repealed by that subsection.

== Subsequent developments ==
The whole act was repealed by section 76 of, and the fourth schedule to, the Gas Act 1948 (11 & 12 Geo. 6. c. 67), the repeal taking effect on 1 May 1949.

== See also ==
- Timeline of the oil and gas industry in the United Kingdom
- Gas Act
