= Gas and Water Works Facilities Act 1870 =

Act of the Parliament of the United Kingdom

- Act of Parliament
- Parliament of the United Kingdom
- Long title: An Act to facilitate in certain cases the obtaining of powers for the construction of Gas and Water Works and for the supply of Gas and Water.
- Citation: 33 & 34 Vict. c. 70
- Territorial extent: United Kingdom

Dates
- Royal assent: 9 August 1870
- Commencement: 9 August 1870 (Note: The Acts of Parliament (Commencement) Act 1793.)
- Repealed: England and Wales and Scotland: 1 May 1949; Northern Ireland: 1 October 1973
Other legislation
Amended by	Gas and Water Works Facilities Act 1870 Amendment Act 1873
Repealed by	England and Wales and Scotland: Water Act 1945, Water (Scotland) Act 1946 and Gas Act 1948; Northern Ireland: Gas Act (Northern Ireland) 1971 and Water and Sewerage Services (Northern Ireland) Order 1973

Status: Repealed

Text of statute as originally enacted

The Gas and Water Works Facilities Act 1870 (33 & 34 Vict. c. 70) was an act of the Parliament of the United Kingdom which regulated the construction of gas and water works.

== Background ==
The gas and water industries had been regulated by local acts of Parliament and by public general acts such as the Gasworks Clauses Act 1847 (10 & 11 Vict. c. 15). The 1870 act aimed to facilitate the acquisition of powers by local authorities for the construction of gasworks and waterworks.

== Provisions ==
The act received royal assent on 9 August 1870. Its long title was 'An Act to facilitate in certain cases the obtaining of powers for the construction of Gas and Water Works and for the supply of Gas and Water.'

The act comprised 15 sections and 2 schedules.

Preliminary.

- Section 1: Short title.
- Section 2: Interpretation of terms.

Description of Cases within this Act.

- Section 3: Act to apply to certain cases.

Provisional Orders authorizing Gas and Water Undertakings.

- Section 4: By whom provisional orders authorizing undertakings may be obtained.
- Section 5: Notices and deposit of documents by promoters as in schedule.
- Section 6: Board of Trade to consider application and objection.
- Section 7: Board of Trade to make Provisional Order. Form and contents of Provisional Order. Costs of Order.
- Section 8: Publication of Provisional Order.
- Section 9: Confirmation of Provisional Order by Act of Parliament.
- Section 10: Incorporation of general Acts in Provisional Order.
- Section 11: Cesser of powers at expiration of prescribed time.
- Section 12: Gas rents and water rates.
- Section 13: Company not exempt from provisions of general Act.
- Section 14: Queen in Council may substitute any department for Board of Trade for the purposes of this Act.
- Section 15: Act not to apply to Metropolis.

SCHEDULE A. Districts, Local Authorities, Boroughs, Townships, and the authorities within these locations.

SCHEDULE B. Provisional Orders.

- Part I. Advertisement in October or November of intended application.
- Part II. Deposit on or before 30 November.
- Part III. Deposit on or before 23 December.
- Part IV. Deposit and advertisement of Provisional Order when made.

== Subsequent developments ==
The act was amended by the Gas and Water Works Facilities Act 1870 Amendment Act 1873 (36 & 37 Vict. c. 89).

The whole act was repealed for England and Wales and Scotland by section 76 of, and the fourth schedule to, the Gas Act 1948 (11 & 12 Geo. 6. c. 67), which came into force on 1 May 1949. The 1948 act nationalised the British gas industry.

== See also ==
- Oil and gas industry in the United Kingdom
