= Gas Regulation Act 1920 =

Act of the Parliament of the United Kingdom

Gas Regulation Act 1920 (Note: Section 22.)
- Act of Parliament
- Parliament of the United Kingdom
- Long title: An Act to amend the Law with respect to the supply of Gas.
- Citation: 10 & 11 Geo. 5. c. 28
- Territorial extent: United Kingdom

Dates
- Royal assent: 4 August 1920
- Commencement: 4 August 1920 (Note: The Acts of Parliament (Commencement) Act 1793.)
- Repealed: England and Wales and Scotland: 1 May 1949 (Note: The Gas (Vesting Date) Order 1949 (SI 1949/392).); Northern Ireland: 13 April 1977
Other legislation
Amended by	Gas Undertakings Act 1929; Gas Undertakings Act 1934
Repealed by	England and Wales and Scotland: Gas Act 1948; Northern Ireland: Gas (Northern Ireland) Order 1977

Status: Repealed

Text of statute as originally enacted

The Gas Regulation Act 1920 (10 & 11 Geo. 5. c. 28) was an act of the Parliament of the United Kingdom to amend the law relating to the supply of gas.

== Background ==
This act provided for the reconstruction of the gas industry. It applied to local authorities as well as company gas undertakings. It reflected modern scientific thinking on the basis for measuring the quality of gas. It also modernised the scale of charges for gas.

== Provisions ==
The act comprised 22 sections under five headings, and a schedule.

Price and Quality of Gas

- Section 1: Power to substitute new basis of charges.
- Section 2: Composition and pressure of gas to be supplied.
- Section 3: Restrictions on power to charge for thermal units.

Testing of Gas

- Section 4: Appointment of gas referees and examiners.
- Section 5: Power to prescribe tests.
- Section 6: Appeals to chief gas examiner.
- Section 7: Remuneration and expenses of gas referees.

Forfeiture and Penalties

- Section 8: Penalties for failure to comply with prescriptions of gas referees.
- Section 9: Forfeiture of deficient calorific value &c.

Power to make special orders

- Section 10: Power to make special Orders, 33 & 34 Vict. C. 70.

General

- Section 11: Fees for examination of meters.
- Section 12: Application of sections 5 and 6 of 4 Edw. 7 c. 28
- Section 13: Meters to be stamped.
- Section 14: Qualification for appointment as inspector of meters.
- Section 15: Accounts and returns.
- Section 16: Power to make rules.
- Section 17: Exercise of powers of Board of Trade.
- Section 18: Definitions.
- Section 19: Supersession of existing enactments.
- Section 20: Expenses of local authorities.
- Section 21: Application of to Scotland and Ireland.
- Section 22: Short title.

Schedule

- Provision of the Factory and Workshops Act 1901 applied to special orders made under this act.

== Subsequent developments ==
The whole act was repealed for England and Wales and Scotland by section 76 of, and the fourth schedule to, the Gas Act 1948 (11 & 12 Geo. 6. c. 67), which came into force on 1 May 1949. The 1948 act nationalised the British gas industry.

The whole act was repealed for Northern Ireland by section 30(2) of, and part I of schedule 3 to, the Gas (Northern Ireland) Order 1977 (SI 1977/596), which came into force on 13 April 1977.

== See also ==
- Oil and gas industry in the United Kingdom
