= Gas Undertakings Act 1929 =

Act of the Parliament of the United Kingdom

Gas Undertakings Act 1929 (Note: Section 10(1).)
- Act of Parliament
- Parliament of the United Kingdom
- Long title: An act to amend the law with respect to gas undertakings, and for purposes connected therewith.
- Citation: 19 & 20 Geo. 5. c. 24
- Introduced by: Herbert Williams, Parliamentary Secretary of the Board of Trade, 19 April 1929, Second Reading (Commons)
- Territorial extent: England and Wales; Scotland; (Note: Section 10(3).)

Dates
- Royal assent: 10 May 1929
- Commencement: 10 May 1929 (Note: The Acts of Parliament (Commencement) Act 1793.)
- Repealed: 1 May 1949 (Note: The Gas (Vesting Date) Order 1949 (SI 1949/392).)
Other legislation
Amends	Gasworks Clauses Act 1847; Gas Regulation Act 1920
Amended by	Gas Undertakings Act 1934
Repealed by	Gas Act 1948

Status: Repealed

Text of statute as originally enacted

The Gas Undertakings Act 1929 (19 & 20 Geo. 5. c. 24) was an act of the Parliament of the United Kingdom which amended the law with respect to gas undertakings (coal-gas manufacturers and suppliers).

== Background ==
The British gas industry had been established in the 1810s to sell gas for lighting purposes. Much of the legislation regulating the industry dated from the mid-19th century. By 1929 only about 10 percent of gas was used for lighting, two thirds was used for heating, and a quarter for industry. The legislation was by then about 60 years old and no longer reflected the modern gas industry. Industry bodies such as the National Gas Council of Great Britain and Ireland and the National Fuel and Power Council had been lobbying for a revision to the legislation. The 1929 act aimed to address these issues.

== Provisions ==
The act comprises 10 sections and a schedule

- Section 1: Power of Board of Trade to make orders increasing authorised amount of share capital or of loans.
- Section 2: Authorised amount of loans.
- Section 3: Increase of authorised amount of reserved fund or of special purposes fund. Sections 31 and 33 of the Gasworks Clauses Act 1847 (10 & 11 Vict. c.15) provided for the formation of a reserve fund of a prescribed sum.
- Section 4: Extension of powers of purchase of residual products.
- Section 5: Supply of gas by undertakers to premises outside limits of supply.
- Section 6: Undertakers supplying more than a certain quantity of gas to charge on basis of British thermal units.
- Section 7: Extension of Board of Trade's power to make special orders under principal act.
- Section 8: Minor amendments of principal act. That is the Gas Regulation Act 1920.
- Section 9: Interpretation.
- Section 10: Short title, citation, construction and extent. The act did not extend to Northern Ireland.
- Schedule: Minor amendments of Gas Regulation Act 1920. Sections 1, 4, 6, 9 and 18.

== Subsequent developments ==
The whole act was repealed by section 76 of, and the fourth schedule to, the Gas Act 1948 (11 & 12 Geo. 6. c. 67), which came into force on 1 May 1949. The 1948 act nationalised the British gas industry.

== See also ==
- Oil and gas industry in the United Kingdom
