= Gas Act 1948 =

Act of the Parliament of the United Kingdom

Gas Act 1948 (Note: Section 77(1).)
- Act of Parliament
- Parliament of the United Kingdom
- Long title: An Act to provide for the establishment of Area Gas Boards and a Gas Council and for the exercise and performance by those Boards and that Council of functions relating to the supply of gas and coke and certain other matters; for the transfer to such Boards as aforesaid and to the said Council of property, rights, obligations and liabilities of gas undertakers and other persons; for co-ordinating the activities of Area Gas Boards and the National Coal Board relating to carbonization; to amend the law relating to the supply of gas; to make certain consequential provision as to Income Tax; and for purposes connected with the matters aforesaid.
- Citation: 11 & 12 Geo. 6. c. 67
- Introduced by: 22 January 1948 (Commons)
- Territorial extent: England and Wales; Scotland; (Note: Section 77(2).)

Dates
- Royal assent: 30 July 1948
- Commencement: 30 July 1948 (various) (Note: The Acts of Parliament (Commencement) Act 1793.); 1 May 1949 (vesting date) (Note: Sections 17(1) and 76. The Gas (Vesting Date) Order 1949 (SI 1949/392).)
- Repealed: 1 January 1973 (Note: The Gas Act 1972 (Appointed Day) Order 1972 (SI 1972/1440).)
Other legislation
Repeals/revokes	See § Repealed enactments
Amended by	Rating and Valuation (Scotland) Act 1952; Law Reform (Limitation of Actions, etc.) Act 1954; Gas Act 1960; Charities Act 1960; Electricity and Gas Act 1963; Statute Law Revision Act 1964; Gas Act 1965; Statute Law Revision (Consequential Repeals) Act 1965; National Loans Act 1968; Theft Act 1968
Repealed by	Gas Act 1972
Relates to	Electricity Act 1947; Transport Act 1947; Iron and Steel Act 1949

Status: Repealed

Text of statute as originally enacted

The Gas Act 1948 (11 & 12 Geo. 6. c. 67) was an act of the Parliament of the United Kingdom which nationalised, or bought into state control, the gas making and supply industry in Great Britain. It established 12 area gas boards to own and operate all public gas-making, distribution and sales facilities and created a central authority: the Gas Council. It vested the existing local authority and company-owned gas undertakings into the area boards with effect from 1 May 1949. The Gas Act 1948 was one of a number of acts promulgated by the post-war Labour government to nationalise elements of the UK's industrial infrastructure; other acts include the Coal Industry Nationalisation Act 1946; the Electricity Act 1947; Transport Act 1947 (railways and long-distance road haulage); and the Iron and Steel Act 1949.

== Background ==
Prior to nationalisation of the gas industry there were about 1,064 gas supply undertakings in Britain; about one-third were municipal local authority undertakings and about two-thirds were company undertakings.

In June 1944 the Minister of Fuel and Power appointed a committee of inquiry under the chairmanship of Geoffrey Heyworth to review the structure and organisation of the industry and to advise on changes to develop and cheapen gas supplies. The committee reported in November 1945: The Gas Industry: Report of the Committee of Inquiry Cmd.6699. It recommended the compulsory purchase by the government of all gas undertakings and the creation of ten regional gas boards. The Heyworth Committee report formed the basis of the Gas Bill 1948.

== Provisions ==
The Gas Bill was introduced into the House of Commons on 22 January 1948 by Hugh Gaitskell the Minister of Fuel and Power. The committee stage of the Bill was prolonged including a session of 51 hours. The Gas Act 1948 received royal assent in July 1948. Its long title is: ‘An Act to provide for the establishment of Area Gas Boards and a Gas Council and for the exercise and performance by those Boards and that Council of functions relating to the supply of gas and coke and certain other matters; for the transfer to such Boards as aforesaid and to the said Council of property, rights, obligations and liabilities of gas undertakers and other persons; for co-ordinating the activities of Area Gas Boards and the National Coal Board relating to carbonization; to amend the law relating to the supply of gas; to make certain consequential provision as to Income Tax; and for purposes connected with the matters aforesaid’.

Part 1 of act defined the way in which the industry was to be run. It specifically placed authority in the area boards, which were autonomous. Area boards were charged with the three duties:

1. To develop and maintain an efficient, co-ordinated and economical system of gas supply for their areas and to satisfy, so far as it is economic to do so, all reasonable demands for gas within their area.
2. To develop and maintain the efficient, co-ordinated and economical production of coke, other than metallurgical coke.
3. To develop and maintain efficient methods of recovering by-products obtained in the process of manufacturing gas.

Part 2 of the act defined the assets to be acquired and how they were to be paid for. The Heyworth committee had recommended ten area boards, however the act included Scotland and Wales making 12 boards.

Section 9 established consultative councils for each area board. They were charged with considering any matter affecting the supply of gas in the area; and of considering and reporting to the area board any such matter. Each council had between 20 and 30 members. Some members were appointed as representatives of local authorities and some as representatives of commerce, industry, labour and other interests.

Section 22 defined the Gas Council's formal responsibilities:

1. to advise the minister in questions affecting the gas industry and matters relating thereto;
2. to promote and assist the efficient exercise and performance by area boards of their function.

Section 51 required the gas industry to consult with the Coal Board to coordinate the operation of coke ovens which were owned and operated by collieries but which supplied the gas industry with gas.

Section 55 empowered the minister to define the standards of the gas supplied including its pressure, calorific value and composition.

Section 62 empowered the Gas Council to take over the industry's existing bodies such as the British Gas Council and the Association of Gas Corporations.

Schedule 4 repealed all previous irrelevant enactments relating to the gas industry, the 1948 act itself became the new legal basis.

=== Repealed enactments ===
Section 76 of the act repealed 28 enactments, listed in the fourth schedule to the act, as from the vesting date.

Citation	Short title	Extent of repeal
10 & 11 Vict. c. 15	Gasworks Clauses Act 1847	The whole act.
22 & 23 Vict. c. 66	Sale of Gas Act 1859	The whole act.
23 & 24 Vict. c. 146	Sale of Gas Act 1860	The whole act.
27 & 28 Vict. c. 96	Sale of Gas (Scotland) Act 1864	The whole act.
33 & 34 Vict. c. 70	Gas and Water Works Facilities Act 1870	The whole act.
34 & 35 Vict. c. 41	Gasworks Clauses Act 1871	The whole act.
36 & 37 Vict. c. 89	Gas and Water Works Facilities Act 1870 Amendment Act 1873	The whole act.
38 & 39 Vict. c. 55	Public Health Act 1875	In section 161, the words from " where there is not any company or person " to the end of the section. Section 162.
39 & 40 Vict. c. 49	Burghs Gas Supply (Scotland) Act 1876	The whole act.
41 & 42 Vict. c. 49	Weights and Measures Act 1878	Section 66.
51 & 52 Vict. c. 41	Local Government Act 1888	In paragraph (xiii) of section 3, the words " and to gas meters ". Paragraph (e) of subsection (3) of section 34. Paragraph (d) of subsection (1) of section 39.
52 & 53 Vict. c. 21	Weights and Measures Act 1889	Section 15.
52 & 53 Vict. c. 50	Local Government (Scotland) Act 1889	In section 11 the words " to gas meters ".
55 & 56 Vict. c. 55	Burgh Police (Scotland) Act 1892	In section 99 the words from " The Gasworks Clauses Act, 1847 " to the end of the section; sections 102 and 103.
56 & 57 Vict. c. 52	Burghs Gas Supply (Scotland) Act 1893	The whole act.
63 & 64 Vict. c. 49	Town Councils (Scotland) Act 1900	In section 8, the word " gas " in both places where it occurs.
63 & 64 Vict. c. cclxxii	Metropolis Gas (Prepayment Meter) Act 1900	The whole act.
6 & 7 Geo. 5. c. 25	Gas (Standard of Calorific Power) Act 1916	The whole act.
8 & 9 Geo. 5. c. 45	Burghs Gas Supply (Scotland) Amendment Act 1918	The whole act.
10 & 11 Geo. 5. c. 28	Gas Regulation Act 1920	The whole act.
19 & 20 Geo. 5. c. 24	Gas Undertakings Act 1929	The whole act.
22 & 23 Geo. 5. c. 40	Gas Undertakings Act 1932	The whole act.
22 & 23 Geo. 5. c. lxiii	Kettering Gas Act 1932	Section 6.
23 & 24 Geo. 5. c. xliii	Commercial Gas Act 1933	The whole act.
23 & 24 Geo. 5. c. lxxi	Gas Light and Coke Company's Act 1933	Section 4.
24 & 25 Geo. 5. c. xvi	South Metropolitan Gas (No. 1) Act 1934	The whole act.
24 & 25 Geo. 5. c. xvii	Brighton, Hove and Worthing Gas Act 1934	The whole act.
24 & 25 Geo. 5. c. 28	Gas Undertakings Act 1934	The whole act.

== Subsequent developments ==
The Gas Act 1960 (8 & 9 Eliz. 2. c. 27) increased the Gas Council's borrowing powers to £500 million.

The Gas Act 1965 increased the council's borrowing powers to £1,200 million; it also allowed it to manufacture or acquire gas and supply gas in bulk to Area Boards. The new powers allowed it to enter joint ventures with other corporations. For example, with Amoco to explore and exploit natural gas fields in parts of the Southern North Sea.

The whole act was repealed by section 49(3) of, and schedule 8 to, the Gas Act 1972, which came into force on 1 January 1973. The 1972 act established the British Gas Corporation to centralise control and operation of the industry. Area Boards were made regions of the British Gas Corporation and the Gas Council was abolished.
