= Gas (Standard of Calorific Power) Act 1916 =

Act of the Parliament of the United Kingdom

Gas (Standard of Calorific Power) Act 1916 (Note: Section 2.)
- Act of Parliament
- Parliament of the United Kingdom
- Long title: An Act to authorise as respects gas undertakings the substitution of a standard of calorific power for a standard of illuminating power.
- Citation: 6 & 7 Geo. 5. c. 25
- Territorial extent: United Kingdom

Dates
- Royal assent: 3 August 1916
- Commencement: 3 August 1916 (Note: The Acts of Parliament (Commencement) Act 1793.)
- Repealed: 1 May 1949 (Note: The Gas (Vesting Date) Order 1949 (SI 1949/392).)
Other legislation
| Repealed by | Gas Act 1948 |

Status: Repealed

Text of statute as originally enacted

The Gas (Standard of Calorific Power) Act 1916 (6 & 7 Geo. 5. c. 25) was an act of the Parliament of the United Kingdom that regulated and amended the quality of coal gas supplied to consumers.

== Background ==
From the early days of the British gas industry in the 1810s coal gas had been used for lighting, whether by open flames or a gas mantle. The quality of gas supplied was therefore optimised to maximise the lighting power of gas. As the industry developed so new uses of gas were found such as heating and cooking. The old standard of illuminating power was inappropriate where the majority of gas was used for heating. The act authorised gas to be sold in terms of its calorific (heating) value.

== Provisions ==
The act comprises two sections.

- Section 1: Power to substitute a standard of calorific power for a standard of illuminating power.
- Section 2: Short title.

== Subsequent developments ==
The whole act was repealed by section 76 of, and the fourth schedule to, the Gas Act 1948 (11 & 12 Geo. 6. c. 67), which came into force on 1 May 1949. The 1948 act nationalised the British gas industry.

== See also ==
- Oil and gas industry in the United Kingdom
