= Gas and Water Works Facilities Act 1870 Amendment Act 1873 =

Act of the Parliament of the United Kingdom

- Act of Parliament
- Parliament of the United Kingdom
- Long title: An Act to extend and amend the provisions of the Gas and Water Works Facilities Act, 1870.
- Citation: 36 & 37 Vict. c. 89
- Territorial extent: United Kingdom

Dates
- Royal assent: 5 August 1873
- Commencement: 5 August 1873 (Note: The Acts of Parliament (Commencement) Act 1793.)
- Repealed: England and Wales and Scotland: 1 May 1949; Northern Ireland: 1 October 1973
Other legislation
Amends	Gas and Water Works Facilities Act 1870
Amended by	Statute Law Revision Act 1883
Repealed by	England and Wales and Scotland: Water Act 1945, Water (Scotland) Act 1946 and Gas Act 1948; Northern Ireland: Gas Act (Northern Ireland) 1971 and Water and Sewerage Services (Northern Ireland) Order 1973

Status: Repealed

Text of statute as originally enacted

The Gas and Water Works Facilities Act 1870 Amendment Act 1873 (36 & 37 Vict. c. 89) was an act of the Parliament of the United Kingdom that extended and amended the provisions of the Gas and Water Works Facilities Act 1870 (33 & 34 Vict. c. 70).

== Background ==
Having operated under the 1870 act, the Board of Trade thought it was expedient to have powers to make provisional orders, to hold inquiries and to make or amend rules for enforcing the act.

== Provisions ==
The act comprised 15 sections and a schedule:

- Section 1: Short Title. This act may be cited for all purposes as "The Gas and Water Works Facilities Act 1870, Amendment Act, 1873."
- Section 12: Provisional Orders. Power of Board of Trade to revoke, amend, extend, or vary Provisional Order.
- Section 13: Inquiries. Where, in relation to any application for a Provisional Order under the Gas and Water Works Facilities Act 1870, or under this Act, it is in the opinion of the Board of Trade expedient that an inquiry should be held, they may order and direct such inquiry to be held at such time and place as they may think proper.
- Section 14: Rules for carrying Acts into effect. The Board of Trade may from time to time make, and, when made, may rescind, annul, or add to, the rules for carrying the Acts into effect.
- Section 15: This Act shall not apply to any place within the Metropolis as the same is defined in the Metropolis Management Act, 1855.

== Subsequent developments ==
Sections 2–11 of, and the schedule to, the act were repealed by section 1 of, and the schedule to, the Statute Law Revision Act 1878 (46 & 47 Vict. c. 39), which came into force on 25 August 1883.

The whole act was repealed for England and Wales and Scotland by section 76 of, and the fourth schedule to, the Gas Act 1948 (11 & 12 Geo. 6. c. 67), which came into force on 1 May 1949. The 1948 act nationalised the British gas industry.

== See also ==
- Oil and gas industry in the United Kingdom
