= National Gas Council of Great Britain and Ireland =

The National Gas Council of Great Britain and Ireland, also known as the National Gas Council, was established in 1916 to speak and act on behalf of the employers in the gas industry. It was abolished upon the nationalisation of the gas industry in 1949.

The Council was made up of members of the governing bodies (boards of directors) of organisations involved in the British gas industry. Over the period of its establishment, it had three presidents:

- Henry Edward Jones (1843 – 1925); president 1916 – 1919;
- Sir David Milne-Watson (1869 –1945); president 1919 – 1943);
- Frank Harding Jones (1874 – 1954; president 1943 – 1949).

A technical committee was appointed in 1922 to investigate the issues around the installation and use of gas geysers for water heating.

In 1937 a proposal was made to pipe methane gas from collieries to domestic consumers.

In the 1920s the National Gas Council was located at 28 Grosvenor Gardens, London SW.

== Associated organisations ==
The pre-nationalisation gas industry was managed, controlled and represented by several corporate bodies.

In 1934 the British Gas Federation was established as a forum to provide a consensus on general matters of gas industry policy and to represent the collective interests of the following organisations:

- Institution of Gas Engineers (founded 1863);
- Gas Companies Protection Association (established 1898), Reginald Willian Edwards and Henry Edward Jones were both chairman;
- Society of British Gas Industries (established 1905) to represent the interests of appliance manufacturers; Presidents included: Dugald Clerk; Sir George Livesey; Dr Thomas Newbigging; J H Balfour Browne; Prof Arthur Smithells; Dr Sir Corbet Woodall; Prof Harald Dixon; Sir Alfred Keogh.
- British Commercial Gas Association (BCGA) (established 1912) to serve as a publicity agency for the industry, Sir Frances Goodenough was executive chairman 1912 – 1936, located at 47 Victoria Street, London SW;
- National Gas Council of Great Britain and Ireland (1916).

In 1937 the National Gas Council became one of the organisations located in Gas Industry House, Grosvenor Place, London. Other co-located organisations were the:

- Institution of Gas Engineers (founded 1863);
- British Commercial Gas Association;
- Women’s Gas Council (established1935);
- British Gas Federation.

In 1943 a British Gas Association was proposed by a merger of the British Commercial Gas Association and the National Gas Council of Great Britain and Ireland; this proposal was not implemented.

In 1946 the British Gas Council was established from a merger of the British Commercial Gas Association and the National Gas Council of Great Britain and Ireland; it worked to oppose nationalisation of the gas industry. The chairman was Edgar Sylvester, later to become chair of the Gas Council.

== Abolition ==
The National Gas Council of Great Britain and Ireland was abolished in May 1949 upon the nationalisation of the British gas industry.

At the time of nationalisation there were four national gas bodies which were taken over:

- British Gas Council;
- Federation of Gas Employers;
- National Federation of Gas Coke Associations;
- Association of Gas Corporations.

== See also ==
Oil and gas industry in the United Kingdom
