= Gas Undertakings Act 1932 =

Act of the Parliament of the United Kingdom

Gas Undertakings Act 1932 (Note: Section 5(1).)
- Act of Parliament
- Parliament of the United Kingdom
- Long title: An act to amend the law with respect to gas undertakings.
- Citation: 22 & 23 Geo. 5. c. 40
- Introduced by: Lord Bridgeman, 15 March 1932 (Lords)
- Territorial extent: England and Wales; Scotland; (Note: Section 5(2).)

Dates
- Royal assent: 12 July 1932
- Commencement: 12 July 1932 (Note: The Acts of Parliament (Commencement) Act 1793.)
- Repealed: 1 May 1949 (Note: The Gas (Vesting Date) Order 1949 (SI 1949/392).)
Other legislation
Repealed by	Gas Act 1948

Status: Repealed

Text of statute as originally enacted

The Gas Undertakings Act 1932 (22 & 23 Geo. 5. c. 40) was an act of the Parliament of the United Kingdom which amended the law with respect to gas undertakings (coal-gas manufacturers and suppliers).

== Background ==
The legislation governing the gas industry had prohibited undertakings from co-operating with each other to most efficiently and profitably process and sell byproducts such as coke, tar, benzol and ammonia. The proposed legislation enabled undertakers to buy shares in other gas companies to facilitate the marketing and sale of residual products. The Gas Undertakings Act 1932 aimed to address these issues.

== Provisions ==
The act comprised five sections

- Section 1: Power of undertakers to invest in securities of other companies.
- Section 2: Power of local authorities to borrow for purposes of act.
- Section 3: Application of profits on investments under this act.
- Section 4: Interpretation.
- Section 5: Short title, citation and extent. The act did not extend to Northern Ireland.

== Subsequent developments ==
The whole act was repealed by section 76 of, and the fourth schedule to, the Gas Act 1948 (11 & 12 Geo. 6. c. 67), which came into force on 1 May 1949. The 1948 act nationalised the British gas industry.

== See also ==
- Oil and gas industry in the United Kingdom
