= Sale of Gas Act 1860 =

Act of the Parliament of the United Kingdom

- Act of Parliament
- Parliament of the United Kingdom
- Long title: An Act to amend the Act for regulating Measures used in Sales of Gas.
- Citation: 23 & 24 Vict. 146
- Territorial extent: United Kingdom

Dates
- Royal assent: 29 August 1860
- Commencement: 29 August 1860 (Note: Section 1.)
- Repealed: England and Wales and Scotland: 1 May 1949 (Note: The Gas (Vesting Date) Order 1949 (SI 1949/392).); Northern Ireland: 13 April 1977
Other legislation
| Amends | Sale of Gas Act 1859 |
| Repealed by | England and Wales and Scotland: Gas Act 1948; Northern Ireland: Gas (Northern Ireland) Order 1977 |

Status: Repealed

Text of statute as originally enacted

The Sale of Gas Act 1860 (23 & 24 Vict. c. 146) was an act of the Parliament of the United Kingdom which amends certain provisions made under the Sale of Gas Act 1859 (22 & 23 Vict. 66).

== Background ==
The Sale of Gas Act 1859 (22 & 23 Vict. 66) required certain models of measures to be used. Since this act came into force, delays occurred in preparing these measures. Consequently, it was necessary to delay the coming into force of the provisions of the cited act of 1859.

== Provisions ==
The act received royal assent on 28 August 1860. Its long title was 'An Act to amend the Act for regulating Measures used in Sales of Gas.'

The act comprises two sections:

- Section 1: Calculation of time specified in recited act.
- Section 2: Construction of acts and recovery of penalties.

== Subsequent developments ==
The whole act was repealed for England and Wales and Scotland by section 76 of, and the fourth schedule to, the Gas Act 1948 (11 & 12 Geo. 6. c. 67), which came into force on 1 May 1949. The 1948 act nationalised the British gas industry.

The whole act was repealed for Northern Ireland by section 30(2) of, and part I of schedule 3 to, the Gas (Northern Ireland) Order 1977 (SI 1977/596), which came into force on 13 April 1977.

== See also ==
- Oil and gas industry in the United Kingdom
