= List of statutory instruments of the United Kingdom, 2001 =

This is an incomplete list of statutory instruments of the United Kingdom in 2001. There is 2280 items listed here, out of a total of 2285

== Statutory instruments ==
=== 1–100 ===
- The Road Traffic (Permitted Parking Area and Special Parking Area) (County of Kent) (District of Dover) Order 2001 (SI 2001/1)
- The Pet Travel Scheme (Pilot Arrangements) (England) (Amendment) Order 2001 (SI 2001/6)
- The Climate Change Levy (Registration and Miscellaneous Provisions) Regulations 2001 (SI 2001/7)
- The Post Office Company (Nomination and Appointed Day) Order 2001 (SI 2001/8)
- The Fishing Vessels (Code of Practice for the Safety of Small Fishing Vessels) Regulations 2001 (SI 2001/9)
- The General Osteopathic Council (Election of Members and Chairman of Council) Rules Order of Council 2001 (SI 2001/15)
- The Norfolk and Norwich Health Care National Health Service Trust Change of Name and (Establishment) Amendment Order 2001 (SI 2001/16)
- The Federal Republic of Yugoslavia (Supply, Sale and Export of Petroleum and Petroleum Products) (Revocation) Regulations 2001 (SI 2001/17)
- The Social Security (Claims and Payments) Amendment Regulations 2001 (SI 2001/18)
- The Tax Credits Schemes (Miscellaneous Amendments) Regulations 2001 (SI 2001/19)
- The Tax Credits Schemes (Miscellaneous Amendments) (Northern Ireland) Regulations 2001 (SI 2001/20)
- Employment Rights (Increase of Limits) Order 2001 (SI 2001/21)
- The Social Security Amendment (Capital Disregards) Regulations 2001 (SI 2001/22)
- The General Teaching Council for England (Registration of Teachers) (Amendment) Regulations 2001 (SI 2001/23)
- The Authorisation of Works (Listed Buildings) (England) Order 2001 (SI 2001/24)
- The Motor Vehicles (Approval) Regulations 2001 (SI 2001/25)
- The South Staffordshire Healthcare National Health Service Trust (Establishment) Order 2001 (SI 2001/44)
- The Social Security (Contributions) (Amendment) Regulations 2001 (SI 2001/45)
- The Social Security (Contributions) (Amendment) (Northern Ireland) Regulations 2001 (SI 2001/46)
- The Greater London Magistrates' Courts Authority (Funding) Regulations 2001 (SI 2001/47)
- The Council for Licensed Conveyancers (Disciplinary Powers) Order 2001 (SI 2001/48)
- Trustee Act 2000 (Commencement) Order 2001 (SI 2001/49)
- The First Community Health, the Foundation and the Premier Health National Health Service Trusts (Dissolution) Order 2001 (SI 2001/51)
- The Immigration Appeals (Family Visitor) (Amendment) Regulations 2001 (SI 2001/52)
- The Motor Vehicles (Driving Licences) (Amendment) Regulations 2001 (SI 2001/53)
- The Merchant Shipping and Fishing Vessels (Health and Safety at Work) (Amendment) Regulations 2001 (SI 2001/54)
- The Units of Measurement Regulations 2001 (SI 2001/55)
- The Income Tax (Electronic Communications) (Incentive Payments) Regulations 2001 (SI 2001/56)
- The Transport Act 2000 (Commencement 3) Order 2001 (SI 2001/57)
- The National Assistance (Assessment of Resources) (Amendment) (England) Regulations 2001 (SI 2001/58)
- The Federal Republic of Yugoslavia (Freezing of Funds) Regulations 2001 (SI 2001/59)
- The Miscellaneous Food Additives (Amendment) (England) Regulations 2001 (SI 2001/60)
- The Whipps Cross Hospital National Health Service Trust (Establishment) Amendment Order 2001 (SI 2001/65)
- The Wyre Forest Primary Care Trust (Establishment) Order 2001 (SI 2001/66)
- The Burntwood, Lichfield and Tamworth Primary Care Trust (Establishment) Order 2001 (SI 2001/67)
- The Local Elections (Parishes and Communities) (Amendment) Rules 2001 (SI 2001/80)
- The Local Elections (Principal Areas) (Amendment) Rules 2001 (SI 2001/81)
- The Registration of Political Parties (Prohibited Words and Expressions) Order 2001 (SI 2001/82)
- The Registration of Political Parties (Fees) Order 2001 (SI 2001/83)
- The Holders of Hereditary Peerages (Overseas Electors) (Transitional Provisions) Order 2001 (SI 2001/84)
- The Weights and Measures (Metrication Amendments) Regulations 2001 (SI 2001/85)
- The Companies (Unregistered Companies) (Amendment) Regulations 2001 (SI 2001/86)
- The Graduated Vehicle Excise Duty (Prescribed Types of Fuel) Regulations 2001 (SI 2001/93)
- The North East Lincolnshire and the Scunthorpe and Goole Hospitals National Health Service Trusts (Dissolution) Order 2001 (SI 2001/96)
- The Central Sheffield University Hospitals and the Northern General Hospital National Health Service Trusts (Dissolution) Order 2001 (SI 2001/97)

=== 101–200 ===
- The Education (Induction Arrangements for School Teachers) (Amendment) (England) Regulations 2001 (SI 2001/103)
- The Stakeholder Pension Schemes (Amendment) Regulations 2001 (SI 2001/104)
- The Charities (Most Honourable and Loyal Society of Ancient Britons (known as St. David's School)) Order 2001 (SI 2001/106)
- The Proscribed Organisations (Applications for Deproscription) Regulations 2001 SI 2001/107
- The Countryside and Rights of Way Act 2000 (Commencement 1) Order 2001 SI 2001/114
- The Transport Act 2000 (Commencement 3) (Amendment) Order 2001 SI 2001/115
- The Representation of the People Act 2000 (Commencement) Order 2001 SI 2001/116
- The Personal Pension Schemes (Restriction on Discretion to Approve) (Permitted Investments) Regulations 2001 SI 2001/117
- The Personal Pension Schemes (Conversion of Retirement Benefits Schemes) Regulations 2001 SI 2001/118
- The Personal Pension Schemes (Transfer Payments) Regulations 2001 SI 2001/119
- The Proscribed Organisations Appeal Commission (Human Rights Act Proceedings) Rules 2001 SI 2001/127
- The Chesterfield Primary Care Trust (Establishment) Order 2001 SI 2001/128
- The Gedling Primary Care Trust (Establishment) Order 2001 SI 2001/129
- The Amber Valley Primary Care Trust (Establishment) Order 2001 SI 2001/130
- The North Sheffield Primary Care Trust (Establishment) Order 2001 SI 2001/131
- The North Lincolnshire Primary Care Trust (Establishment) Order 2001 SI 2001/132
- The North Eastern Derbyshire Primary Care Trust (Establishment) Order 2001 SI 2001/133
- The Melton, Rutland and Harborough Primary Care Trust (Establishment) Order 2001 SI 2001/134
- The Access to Justice Act 1999 (Bar Practising Certificates) Order 2001 SI 2001/135
- The Leicester City West Primary Care Trust (Establishment) Order 2001 SI 2001/136
- The Doncaster East Primary Care Trust (Establishment) Order 2001 SI 2001/137
- The Doncaster West Primary Care Trust (Establishment) Order 2001 SI 2001/138
- The Care Standards Act 2000 (Commencement2 and Transitional Provisions) (Wales) Order 2001 SI 2001/139
- The Children's Homes Amendment (Wales) Regulations 2001 SI 2001/140
- The Merchant Shipping (Mandatory Surveys for Ro-Ro Ferry and High Speed Passenger Craft) Regulations 2001 SI 2001/152
- The Child Support, Pensions and Social Security Act 2000 (Commencement 6) Order 2001 SI 2001/153
- The United Lincolnshire Hospitals National Health Service Trust (Establishment) Amendment Order 2001 SI 2001/154
- The Child Support (Maintenance Calculations and Special Cases) Regulations 2000 SI 2001/155
- The Child Support (Variations) Regulations 2000 SI 2001/156
- The Child Support (Maintenance Calculation Procedure) Regulations 2000 SI 2001/157
- The Child Support (Consequential Amendments and Transitional Provisions) Regulations 2001 SI 2001/158
- The Terrorism Act 2000 (Code of Practice on Audio Recording of Interviews) Order 2001 SI 2001/159
- The Guaranteed Minimum Pensions Increase (No.2) Order 2000 SI 2001/160
- The Child Support (Information, Evidence and Disclosure and Maintenance Arrangements and Jurisdiction) (Amendment) Regulations 2000 SI 2001/161
- The Child Support (Collection and Enforcement and Miscellaneous Amendments) Regulations 2000 SI 2001/162
- The South Stoke Primary Care Trust (Establishment) Order 2001 SI 2001/163
- The Magistrates' Courts (Civilian Enforcement Officers) Rules 2001 SI 2001/164
- The Magistrates' Courts (Children and Young Persons) (Amendment) Rules 2001 SI 2001/165
- The Magistrates' Courts (Forms) (Amendment) Rules 2001 SI 2001/166
- The Magistrates' Courts (Amendment) Rules 2001 SI 2001/167
- The Access to Justice Act 1999 (Commencement 6 and Transitional Provisions) Order 2001 SI 2001/168
- The Trustees for the Central Sheffield University Hospitals National Health Service Trust (Transfer of Trust Property) Order 2001 SI 2001/169
- The Special Trustees for King's College Hospital (Transfer of Trust Property) Order 2001 SI 2001/170
- The Special Trustees for St George's Hospital (Transfer of Trust Property) Order 2001 SI 2001/171
- The Trustees for the Northern General Hospital National Health Service Trust (Transfer of Trust Property) Order 2001 SI 2001/172
- The Special Trustees for Newcastle University Hospitals (Transfer of Trust Property) Order 2001 SI 2001/173
- The Greater Derby Primary Care Trust (Establishment) Order 2001 SI 2001/174
- The Eastern Leicester Primary Care Trust (Establishment) Order 2001 SI 2001/175
- The Ashfield Primary Care Trust (Establishment) Order 2001 SI 2001/176
- The Rushcliffe Primary Care Trust (Establishment) Order 2001 SI 2001/177
- The Channel Tunnel (International Arrangements) (Amendment) Order 2001 SI 2001/178
- The Legal Advice and Assistance (Scope) (Amendment) Regulations 2001 SI 2001/179
- The Road Traffic (Permitted Parking Area and Special Parking Area) (County of Somerset) (District of Taunton Deane) Order 2001 SI 2001/180
- The Nottingham City Primary Care Trust (Establishment) Order 2001 SI 2001/181
- The Sheffield West Primary Care Trust (Establishment) Order 2001 SI 2001/182
- The Sheffield South West Primary Care Trust (Establishment) Order 2001 SI 2001/183
- The South East Sheffield Primary Care Trust (Establishment) Order 2001 SI 2001/184
- The Erewash Primary Care Trust (Establishment) Order 2001 SI 2001/185
- The Bassetlaw Primary Care Trust (Establishment) Order 2001 SI 2001/186
- The Broxtowe & Hucknall Primary Care Trust (Establishment) Order 2001 SI 2001/187
- The Human Fertilisation and Embryology (Research Purposes) Regulations 2001 SI 2001/188
- The Terrorism Act 2000 (Code of Practice on Audio Recording of Interviews) (No. 2) Order 2001 SI 2001/189
- The St George's Healthcare National Health Service Trust (Transfer of Trust Property) Order 2001 SI 2001/190
- The Legal Advice and Assistance (Amendment) Regulations 2001 SI 2001/191
- The Terrorism Act 2000 (Crown Servants and Regulators) Regulations 2001 SI 2001/192
- The Crown Court (Amendment) Rules 2001 (SI 2001/193)
- The Magistrates' Courts (Detention and Forfeiture of Terrorist Cash) Rules 2001 (SI 2001/194)
- The European Communities (Recognition of Professional Qualifications) (Second General System) (Amendment) Regulations 2001 (SI 2001/200)

=== 201–300 ===
- The Countryside and Rights of Way Act 2000 (Commencement 1) (Wales) Order 2001 (SI 2001/203)
- The Taxes (Interest Rate) (Amendment 1) Regulations 2001 (SI 2001/204)
- The Housing (Right to Buy) (Priority of Charges) (England) Order 2001 (SI 2001/205)
- The Statutory Maternity Pay (General) and Statutory Sick Pay (General) (Amendment) Regulations 2001 SI 2001/206
- The Social Security Benefits Up-rating (No. 2) Order 2000 SI 2001/207
- The Additional Pension (First Appointed Year) Order 2001 SI 2001/208
- The Education (Designated Institutions) Order 2001 SI 2001/209
- The Education Standards Fund 2000 (England) (Amendment) Regulations 2001 SI 2001/210
- The Solihull Primary Care Trust (Establishment) Order 2001 SI 2001/211
- The Solihull Healthcare National Health Service Trust (Dissolution) Order 2001 SI 2001/212
- The Newcastle, North Tyneside and Northumberland Mental Health National Health Service Trust (Establishment) Order 2001 SI 2001/213
- The Newcastle City Health and the Northumberland Mental Health National Health Service Trusts (Dissolution) Order 2001 SI 2001/214
- The Local Authorities (Alteration of Requisite Calculations) (England) Regulations 2001 SI 2001/216
- The British Railways Board (Reduction of Membership) Order 2001 SI 2001/217
- The Strategic Rail Authority (Licence Exemption) Order 2001 SI 2001/218
- The Major Precepting Authorities (Excessive Budget Requirements—Payments) (England) Regulations 2001 SI 2001/219
- The Lincoln District Healthcare and the South Lincolnshire Healthcare National Health Service Trusts (Dissolution) Order 2001 SI 2001/220
- The Lincolnshire Healthcare National Health Service Trust (Establishment) Order 2001 SI 2001/221
- The Political Parties, Elections and Referendums Act 2000 (Commencement 1 and Transitional Provisions) Order 2001 SI 2001/222
- The Broadcasting (Limit on the Holding of Licences to Provide Television Multiplex Services) Order 2001 SI 2001/223
- The Greater Manchester (Light Rapid Transit System) (Ashton Moss Variation) Order 2001 SI 2001/224
- The Motor Vehicles (Driving Licences) (Amendment) (No. 2) Regulations 2001 SI 2001/236
- The Employment Tribunals (Increase of Maximum Deposit) Order 2001 SI 2001/237
- The Detention Centre Rules 2001 SI 2001/238
- The Immigration and Asylum Act 1999 (Commencement 9) Order 2001 SI 2001/239
- The Detention Centre (Specified Diseases) Order 2001 SI 2001/240
- The Immigration (Suspension of Detainee Custody Officer Certificate) Regulations 2001 SI 2001/241
- The Transport Act 2000 (Commencement 4)Order 2001 SI 2001/242
- The Local Authorities (Goods and Services) (Public Bodies) (England) Order 2001 SI 2001/243
- The Bromley Primary Care Trust (Establishment) Order 2001 SI 2001/248
- The Tower Hamlets Primary Care Trust (Establishment) Order 2001 SI 2001/249
- The Rail Vehicle Accessibility (Connex South Eastern Class 375 Vehicles) Exemption (Amendment) Order 2001 SI 2001/250
- The Pig Industry Restructuring (Capital Grant) Scheme 2001 SI 2001/251
- The Pig Industry Restructuring (Non-Capital Grant) Scheme 2001 SI 2001/252
- The Finance Act 1989, Section 178(1), (Appointed Day) Order 2001 SI 2001/253
- The Taxes (Interest Rate) (Amendment 2) Regulations 2001 SI 2001/254
- The Stamp Duty Reserve Tax (Investment Exchanges and Clearing Houses) (The London Stock Exchange) Regulations 2001 SI 2001/255
- The Civil Procedure (Amendment) Rules 2001 SI 2001/256
- The Pensions Appeal Tribunals (England and Wales) (Amendment) Rules 2001 SI 2001/257
- The Company and Business Names (Chamber of Commerce, Etc.) Act 1999 (Commencement) Order 2001 SI 2001/258
- The Company and Business Names (Amendment) Regulations 2001 SI 2001/259
- The Charities (Exception from Registration) (Amendment) Regulations 2001 SI 2001/260
- The Employment Zones (Amendment) Regulations 2001 SI 2001/261
- The Strategic Rail Authority (Capital Allowances) Order 2001 SI 2001/262
- The Vale of Aylesbury Primary Care Trust (Establishment) Order 2001 SI 2001/268
- The Hertfordshire Partnership National Health Service Trust (Establishment) Order 2001 SI 2001/269
- The Health Act 1999 (Commencement 10) Order 2001 SI 2001/270
- The Avon and Western Wiltshire Mental Health Care National Health Service Trust (Change of Name) Order 2001 SI 2001/271
- The City and Hackney Primary Care Trust (Establishment) Order 2001 SI 2001/272
- The Lincolnshire South West Primary Care Trust (Establishment) Order 2001 SI 2001/273
- The West Lincolnshire Primary Care Trust (Establishment) Order 2001 SI 2001/274
- The School Milk (Wales) Regulations 2001 SI 2001/275
- The National Assistance (Assessment of Resources) (Amendment) (Wales) Regulations 2001 SI 2001/276
- The Rail Vehicle Accessibility (ScotRail Class 334 Vehicles) Exemption Order 2001 SI 2001/277
- The Teddington, Twickenham and Hamptons Primary Care Trust (Establishment) Order 2001 SI 2001/278
- The Kingston Primary Care Trust (Establishment) Order 2001 SI 2001/279
- The Carriers' Liability (Clandestine Entrants) (Application to Rail Freight) Regulations 2001 SI 2001/280
- The Sheep Annual Premium (Amendment) Regulations 2001 SI 2001/281
- The Hastings and St Leonards Primary Care Trust (Establishment) Order 2001 SI 2001/282
- The Bexhill and Rother Primary Care Trust (Establishment) Order 2001 SI 2001/283
- The South West Kent Primary Care Trust (Establishment) Order 2001 SI 2001/284
- The Maidstone and Malling Primary Care Trust (Establishment) Order 2001 SI 2001/285
- The Northamptonshire Healthcare National Health Service Trust (Establishment) Order 2001 SI 2001/286
- The Air Traffic Services (Exemption) Order 2001 SI 2001/287
- The Special Trustees for the Former United Birmingham Hospitals (Transfer of Trust Property) Order 2001 (SI 2001/288)
- The National Health Service (General Dental Services) Amendment Regulations 2001 (SI 2001/289)
- The Care Standards Act 2000 (Commencement 2 (England) and Transitional Provisions) Order 2001 (SI 2001/290)

=== 301–400 ===
- The Road Vehicles (Construction and Use) (Amendment) Regulations 2001 (SI 2001/306)
- The Goods Vehicles (Plating and Testing) (Amendment) Regulations 2001 (SI 2001/307)
- The Education (London Residuary Body) (Property Transfer) (Revocation) Order 2001 (SI 2001/308)
- The Goods Vehicles (Authorisation of International Journeys) (Fees) (Amendment) Regulations 2001 SI 2001/309
- The European Communities (Matrimonial Jurisdiction and Judgments) Regulations 2001 SI 2001/310
- The Carriers' Liability (Clandestine Entrants and Sale of Transporters) (Amendment) Regulations 2001 SI 2001/311
- The Carriers' Liability (Clandestine Entrants) (Codeof Practice for Rail Freight) Order 2001 SI 2001/312
- The Social Security (Contributions) (Amendment 2) Regulations 2001 SI 2001/313
- The Social Security (Contributions) (Amendment 2) (Northern Ireland) Regulations 2001 SI 2001/314
- The Merger Report (Interbrew SA and Bass PLC) (Interim Provision) Order 2001 SI 2001/318
- The Competition Act 1998 (Public Transport Ticketing Schemes Block Exemption) Order 2001 SI 2001/319
- The Greater London Authority (Allocation of Grants for Precept Calculations) Regulations 2001 SI 2001/320
- The Transport Act 2000 (Designation of Companies) Order 2001 SI 2001/321
- The South West Dorset Primary Care Trust (Establishment) Order 2001 SI 2001/322
- The Berkshire Healthcare National Health Service Trust (Establishment) Order 2001 SI 2001/323
- The North Essex Mental Health Partnership National Health Service Trust (Establishment) Order 2001 SI 2001/324
- The Exeter Primary Care Trust Establishment) Order 2001 SI 2001/325
- The East Berkshire National Health Service Trust for People with Learning Disabilities and the West Berkshire Priority Care Service National Health Service Trust (Dissolution) Order 2001 SI 2001/326
- The University Hospital Birmingham National Health Service Trust (Transfer of Trust Property) Order 2001 SI 2001/327
- The Barnet Primary Care Trust (Establishment) Order 2001 SI 2001/328
- The Haringey Primary Care Trust (Establishment) Order 2001 SI 2001/329
- The East Hampshire Primary Care Trust (Establishment) Order 2001 SI 2001/331
- The Mid-Sussex Primary Care Trust (Establishment) Order 2001 SI 2001/332
- The Buckinghamshire Mental Health National Health Service Trust (Establishment) Order 2001 SI 2001/333
- The Aylesbury Vale Community Healthcare National Health Service Trust (Dissolution) Order 2001 SI 2001/334
- The South Wiltshire Primary Care Trust (Establishment) Order 2001 SI 2001/335
- The Birmingham Children's Hospital National Health Service Trust (Transfer of Trust Property) Order 2001 SI 2001/336
- The Education (The Arts Institute at Bournemouth Further Education Corporation) (Transfer to the Higher Education Sector) Order 2001 SI 2001/337
- The Criminal Justice and Court Services Act 2000 (Commencement 2 ) Order 2001 SI 2001/340
- The Representation of the People (England and Wales) Regulations 2001 SI 2001/341
- The Feeding Stuffs (Wales) Regulations 2001 SI 2001/343
- The Chingford, Wanstead and Woodford Primary Care Trust (Establishment) Order 2001 SI 2001/344
- The North Cheshire Hospitals National Health Service Trust (Establishment) Order 2001 SI 2001/345
- The Slough Primary Care Trust (Establishment) Order 2001 SI 2001/346
- The Wokingham Primary Care Trust (Establishment) Order 2001 SI 2001/347
- The Barking and Dagenham Primary Care Trust (Establishment) Order 2001 SI 2001/348
- The Walthamstow, Leyton and Leytonstone Primary Care Trust (Establishment) Order 2001 SI 2001/349
- The Newham Primary Care Trust (Establishment) Order 2001 SI 2001/350
- The Reading Primary Care Trust (Establishment) Order 2001 SI 2001/351
- The Redbridge Primary Care Trust (Establishment) Order 2001 SI 2001/352
- The Civil Aviation (Publication of Directions) Regulations 2001 SI 2001/353
- The Aerodromes (Designation) (Chargeable Air Services) Order 2001 SI 2001/354
- The Pension Sharing (Excepted Schemes) Order 2001 SI 2001/358
- The Commission for the New Towns (Transfer of Undertaking and Functions) (Tees Barrage) Order 2001 SI 2001/361
- The Community Charges, Council Tax and Non-Domestic Rating (Enforcement) (Magistrates' Courts) (England) Regulations 2001 SI 2001/362
- The Watford and Three Rivers Primary Care Trust (Establishment) Order 2001 SI 2001/364
- The Welwyn Hatfield Primary Care Trust (Establishment) Order 2001 SI 2001/365
- The Tax Credits Schemes (Miscellaneous Amendments 2) (Northern Ireland) Regulations 2001 SI 2001/366
- The Tax Credits Schemes (Miscellaneous Amendments 2) Regulations 2001 SI 2001/367
- The Motor Cycles Etc. (EC Type Approval) (Amendment) Regulations 2001 SI 2001/368
- The Luton Primary Care Trust (Establishment) Order 2001 SI 2001/369
- The Uttlesford Primary Care Trust (Establishment) Order 2001 SI 2001/370
- The South East Hertfordshire Primary Care Trust (Establishment) Order 2001 SI 2001/371
- The Artificial Insemination of Cattle (Animal Health) (Amendment) (England) Regulations 2001 SI 2001/380
- The Bedford Primary Care Trust (Establishment) Order 2001 SI 2001/381
- The Dacorum Primary Care Trust (Establishment) Order 2001 SI 2001/382
- The Great Yarmouth Primary Care Trust (Establishment) Order 2001 SI 2001/383
- The Local Authorities (Capital Finance) (Rate of Discount for 2001/02) (England) Regulations 2001 SI 2001/384
- The Norwich Primary Care Trust (Establishment) Order 2001 SI 2001/385
- The St. Albans and Harpenden Primary Care Trust (Establishment) Order 2001 SI 2001/386
- The Thurrock Primary Care Trust (Establishment) Order 2001 SI 2001/387
- The Basildon Primary Care Trust (Establishment) Order 2001 SI 2001/388
- The Bedfordshire Heartlands Primary Care Trust (Establishment) Order 2001 SI 2001/389
- The Royston, Buntingford and Bishop's Stortford Primary Care Trust (Establishment) Order 2001 SI 2001/390
- The Investment Trusts (Approval of Accounting Methods for Creditor Relationships) Order 2001 SI 2001/391
- The Afghanistan (United Nations Sanctions) (Overseas Territories) Order 2001 SI 2001/392
- The Afghanistan (United Nations Sanctions) Channel Islands) Order 2001 SI 2001/393
- The Afghanistan (United Nations Sanctions) (Isle of Man) Order 2001 SI 2001/394
- The Iraq (United Nations Sanctions) (Overseas Territories) (Amendment) Order 2001 SI 2001/395
- The Afghanistan (United Nations Sanctions) Order 2001 SI 2001/396
- The Air Navigation (Amendment) Order 2001 SI 2001/397
- The National Assembly for Wales (Transfer of Land) Order 2001 (SI 2001/398)
- The Civil Aviation (Chargeable Air Services) (Records) Regulations 2001 (SI 2001/399)
- The Representation of the People (Northern Ireland) Regulations 2001 (SI 2001/400)

=== 401–500 ===
- The Terrorism Act 2000 (Code of Practice on the Exercise of Police Powers) (Northern Ireland) Order 2001 (SI 2001/401)
- The Terrorism Act 2000 (Code of Practice on Video Recording of Interviews) (Northern Ireland) Order 2001 (SI 2001/402)
- The Income Tax (Manufactured Overseas Dividends) (Amendment) Regulations 2001 (SI 2001/403)
- The Income Tax (Building Societies) (Dividends and Interest) (Amendment) Regulations 2001 SI 2001/404
- The Income Tax (Interest Payments) (Information Powers) (Amendment) Regulations 2001 SI 2001/405
- The Income Tax (Deposit-takers) (Interest Payments) (Amendment) Regulations 2001 SI 2001/406
- The Social Security (Reciprocal Agreements) Order 2001 SI 2001/407
- The Pensions Appeal Tribunals (Posthumous Appeals) Amendment Order 2001 SI 2001/408
- The Naval, Military and Air Forces Etc. (Disablement and Death) Service Pensions Amendment Order 2001 SI 2001/409
- The Reciprocal Enforcement of Maintenance Orders (Variation) Order 2001 SI 2001/410
- The European Convention on Cinematographic Co-production (Amendment) Order 2001 SI 2001/411
- The United Nations (International Tribunals) (Former Yugoslavia and Rwanda) (Amendment) Order 2001 SI 2001/412
- The European Communities (Definition of Treaties) (The Convention on Mutual Assistance and Co-operation between Customs Administrations (Naples II)) Order 2001 SI 2001/413
- National Health Service (Optical Charges and Payments) and (General Ophthalmic Services) Amendment Regulations 2001 SI 2001/414
- The Local Government Act 2000 (Commencement 6) Order 2001 SI 2001/415
- The Port of Tyne Harbour Revision Order 2001 SI 2001/416
- The Local Elections (Northern Ireland) (Amendment) Order 2001 SI 2001/417
- The Channel Tunnel (International Arrangements) (Amendment 2) Order 2001 SI 2001/418
- The War Pensions (Mercantile Marine) (Amendment) Scheme 2001 SI 2001/419
- The Personal Injuries (Civilians) Amendment Scheme 2001 SI 2001/420
- The Terrorism Act 2000 (Commencement 3) Order 2001 SI 2001/421
- The Smoke Control Areas (Exempted Fireplaces) (England) Order 2001 SI 2001/422
- The Tir Gofal (Amendment) (Wales) Regulations 2001 SI 2001/423
- The Organic Farming Scheme (Wales) Regulations 2001 SI 2001/424
- The Terrorism Act 2000 (Code of Practice for Authorised Officers) Order 2001 SI 2001/425
- The Terrorism Act 2000 (Carding) Order 2001 SI 2001/426
- The Terrorism Act 2000 (Code of Practice for Examining Officers) Order 2001 SI 2001/427
- The Terrorism (Interviews) (Scotland) Order 2001 SI 2001/428
- The National Park Authorities Levies (Wales) (Amendment) Regulations 2001 SI 2001/429
- The Organic Products Regulations 2001 SI 2001/430
- The England Rural Development Programme (Enforcement) (Amendment) Regulations 2001 SI 2001/431
- The Organic Farming (England Rural Development Programme) Regulations 2001 SI 2001/432
- The A614 Nottingham to Bawtry Trunk Road (Longdale Lane Junction Improvement) Order 2001 SI 2001/433
- The M5 Motorway (Junction 12 Improvement Slip Roads) Order 2001 SI 2001/434
- The Local Education Authority—School Relations Code of Practice Order 2001 SI 2001/435
- The Stockport Primary Care Trust (Establishment) Order 2001 SI 2001/436
- The Bootle and Litherland Primary Care Trust (Establishment) Order 2001 SI 2001/437
- The Heywood and Middleton Primary Care Trust (Establishment) Order 2001 SI 2001/438
- The Bebington and West Wirral Primary Care Trust (Establishment) Order 2001 SI 2001/439
- The Trafford North Primary Care Trust (Establishment) Order 2001 SI 2001/440
- The Carers (Services) and Direct Payments (Amendment) (England) Regulations 2001 SI 2001/441
- The Disabled Children (Direct Payments) (England) Regulations 2001 SI 2001/442
- The Proscribed Organisations Appeal Commission (Procedure) Rules 2001 SI 2001/443
- The Criminal Justice Acts 1987 and 1991 (Notice of Transfer) (Amendment) Regulations 2001 SI 2001/444
- The Companies (EU Political Expenditure) Exemption Order 2001 SI 2001/445
- The Political Parties, Elections and Referendums Act 2000 (Disapplication of Part IV for Northern Ireland Parties, etc.) Order 2001 SI 2001/446
- The Restriction on Pithing (England) Regulations 2001 SI 2001/447
- The Isles of Scilly (Health) Order 2001 SI 2001/448
- The A10 London–Cambridge–King's Lynn Trunk Road (A47 King's Lynn to A14 Milton, Cambridgeshire) Detrunking Order 2001 SI 2001/449
- The A134 Thetford to Tottenhill Trunk Road (A11 Thetford Bypass to A10 Tottenhill) Detrunking Order 2001 SI 2001/450
- The A10 London–Cambridge–King's Lynn Trunk Road (M11 Junction 11 to A505 Royston Hertfordshire) Detrunking Order 2001 SI 2001/451
- The Justices' Chief Executives (Accounts) Regulations 2001 SI 2001/463
- The Plymouth Primary Care Trust (Establishment) Order 2001 SI 2001/465
- The Mid Devon Primary Care Trust (Establishment) Order 2001 SI 2001/466
- The Teignbridge Primary Care Trust (Establishment) Order 2001 SI 2001/467
- The East Devon Primary Care Trust (Establishment) Order 2001 SI 2001/468
- The Mendip Primary Care Trust (Establishment) Order 2001 SI 2001/469
- The West Wiltshire Primary Care Trust (Establishment) Order 2001 SI 2001/470
- The Somerset Coast Primary Care Trust (Establishment) Order 2001 SI 2001/471
- The North Devon Primary Care Trust (Establishment) Order 2001 SI 2001/472
- The Bath and North East Somerset Primary Care Trust (Establishment) Order 2001 SI 2001/473
- The South and East Dorset Primary Care Trust (Establishment) Order 2001 SI 2001/474
- The Financing of Maintained Schools (England) Regulations 2001 SI 2001/475
- The Hill Farm Allowance Regulations 2001 SI 2001/476
- The Social Security (Contributions) (Re-rating and National Insurance Funds Payments) Order 2001 SI 2001/477
- The Parent Governor Representatives (England) Regulations 2001 SI 2001/478
- The Climate Change Levy (Combined Heat and Power Stations) Exemption Certificate Regulations 2001 SI 2001/486
- The Housing Benefit (General) Amendment Regulations 2001 SI 2001/487
- The Social Security (Miscellaneous Amendments) Regulations 2001 SI 2001/488
- The North East Oxfordshire Primary Care Trust (Establishment) Order 2001 SI 2001/489
- The Oxford City Primary Care Trust (Establishment) Order 2001 SI 2001/490
- The Cherwell Vale Primary Care Trust (Establishment) Order 2001 SI 2001/491
- The Transport Act 2000 (Amendment) Order 2001 SI 2001/492
- The Civil Aviation (Chargeable Air Services) (Detention and Sale of Aircraft) Regulations 2001 SI 2001/493
- The Civil Aviation (Chargeable Air Services) (Detention and Sale of Aircraft for Eurocontrol) Regulations 2001 SI 2001/494
- The Financing of Maintained Schools (Amendment) (Wales) Regulations 2001 SI 2001/495
- The Tir Mynydd (Wales) Regulations 2001 SI 2001/496
- Representation of the People (Scotland) Regulations 2001 SI 2001/497
- The Export Restrictions (Foot-And-Mouth Disease) Regulations 2001 (SI 2001/498)
- The Rail Vehicle Accessibility (Midland Mainline Class 170/1 Vehicles) Exemption Order 2001 (SI 2001/499)
- The North Tees Primary Care Trust (Establishment) Order 2001 (SI 2001/500)

=== 501–600 ===
- The Yorkshire Wolds and Coast Primary Care Trust (Establishment) Order 2001 (SI 2001/501)
- The Eastern Hull Primary Care Trust (Establishment) Order 2001 (SI 2001/502)
- The Pollution Prevention and Control (England and Wales) (Amendment) Regulations 2001 (SI 2001/503)
- The Wakefield West Primary Care Trust (Establishment) Order 2001 SI 2001/504
- The North Tyneside Primary Care Trust (Establishment) Order 2001 SI 2001/505
- The Eastern Wakefield Primary Care Trust (Establishment) Order 2001 SI 2001/506
- The Carlisle and District Primary Care Trust (Establishment) Order 2001 SI 2001/507
- The Selby and York Primary Care Trust (Establishment) Order 2001 SI 2001/508
- The West Hull Primary Care Trust (Establishment) Order 2001 SI 2001/509
- The Carers and Disabled Children Act 2000 (Commencement 1) (England) Order 2001 SI 2001/510
- The East Yorkshire Primary Care Trust (Establishment) Order 2001 SI 2001/511
- The West Cumbria Primary Care Trust (Establishment) Order 2001 SI 2001/512
- The Newcastle Primary Care Trust (Establishment) Order 2001 SI 2001/513
- The Eden Valley Primary Care Trust (Establishment) Order 2001 SI 2001/514
- The Hartlepool Primary Care Trust (Establishment) Order 2001 SI 2001/515
- The Financial Services and Markets Act 2000 (Commencement 1) Order 2001 SI 2001/516
- The Social Security Amendment (Joint Claims) Regulations 2001 SI 2001/518
- The Salford Primary Care Trust (Establishment) Order 2001 SI 2001/519
- The Southport and Formby Primary Care Trust (Establishment) Order 2001 SI 2001/520
- The Chorley and South Ribble Primary Care Trust (Establishment) Order 2001 SI 2001/521
- The West Lancashire Primary Care Trust (Establishment) Order 2001 SI 2001/522
- The South East Oxfordshire Primary Care Trust (Establishment) Order 2001 SI 2001/523
- The Newbury and Community Primary Care Trust (Establishment) Order 2001 SI 2001/524
- The South West Oxfordshire Primary Care Trust (Establishment) Order 2001 SI 2001/525
- The Enfield Primary Care Trust (Establishment) Order 2001 SI 2001/526
- The Havering Primary Care Trust (Establishment) Order 2001 SI 2001/527
- The Greenwich Primary Care Trust (Establishment) Order 2001 SI 2001/528
- The Postal Services Act 2000 (Commencement 2) Order 2001 SI 2001/534
- The Representation of the People (Variation of Limits of Candidates' Election Expenses) Order 2001 SI 2001/535
- The Nurses, Midwives and Health Visitors (Professional Conduct) (Amendment) Rules 2001 Approval Order 2001 SI 2001/536
- The Housing Benefit and Council Tax Benefit (Extended Payments) Regulations 2001 SI 2001/537
- The Social Security (Invalid Care Allowance) Amendment Regulations 2001 SI 2001/538
- The Colchester Primary Care Trust (Establishment) Order 2001 SI 2001/539
- The Isles of Scilly (Primary Care) Order 2001 SI 2001/540
- The Feeding Stuffs (Sampling and Analysis) (Amendment) (England) Regulations 2001 SI 2001/541
- The Royal Air Force Terms of Service (Amendment) Regulations 2001 SI 2001/542
- The Huntingdonshire Primary Care Trust (Establishment) Order 2001 SI 2001/543
- The Financial Services and Markets Act 2000 (Regulated Activities) Order 2001 SI 2001/544
- Local Authorities (Alteration of Requisite Calculations) (Wales) Regulations 2001 SI 2001/559
- The Road Vehicles Lighting (Amendment) Regulations 2001 SI 2001/560
- The Road Vehicles (Display of Registration Marks) Regulations 2001 SI 2001/561
- The Criminal Justice and Court Services Act 2000 (Commencement 3) Order 2001 SI 2001/562
- The Education (Student Support) (European Institutions) (Amendment) Regulations 2001 SI 2001/563
- The Race Relations (Amendment) Act 2000 (Commencement) Order 2001 SI 2001/566
- The Tax Credits (Claims and Payments) (Amendment) Regulations 2001 SI 2001/567
- The Tax Credits (Claims and Payments) (Northern Ireland) (Amendment) Regulations 2001 SI 2001/568
- The Education (Budget Statements) (England) Regulations 2001 SI 2001/569
- The Education (Outturn Statements) (England) Regulations 2001 SI 2001/570
- The Foot-and-Mouth Disease (Amendment) (England) Order 2001 SI 2001/571
- The Foot-and-Mouth Disease (Amendment) (Wales) Order 2001 SI 2001/572
- The Social Security (Credits and Incapacity Benefit) Amendment Regulations 2001 SI 2001/573
- The Mid-Hampshire Primary Care Trust (Establishment) Order 2001 SI 2001/574
- The North Hertfordshire and Stevenage Primary Care Trust (Establishment) Order 2001 SI 2001/575
- The Leicestershire (Recovery of Expenses) Order 2001 SI 2001/595
- The Social Security (Contributions) (Amendment 3) Regulations 2001 SI 2001/596
- The Social Security (Contributions) (Amendment 3) (Northern Ireland) Regulations 2001 SI 2001/597
- The Financial Services Act 1986 (Electricity Industry Exemption) Order 2001 (SI 2001/598)
- The Measuring Equipment (Capacity Measures) (Amendment) Regulations 2001 (SI 2001/599)
- The Special Educational Needs Tribunal Regulations 2001 (SI 2001/600)

=== 601–700 ===
- The New Forest Primary Care Trust (Establishment) Order 2001 (SI 2001/601)
- The Greater London Magistrates' Courts Authority (Provision of Court-houses etc.) Regulation 2001 (SI 2001/603)
- The Highways Noise Payments (Movable Homes) (Wales) Regulations 2001 (SI 2001/604)
- The Local Government and Housing Act 1989 (Electronic Communications) (Wales) Order 2001 SI 2001/605
- The Local Education Authority (Behaviour Support Plans) (Amendment) (Wales) Regulations 2001 SI 2001/606
- The Homeless Persons (Priority Need) (Wales) Order 2001 SI 2001/607
- The Diseases of Animals (Approved Disinfectants) (Amendment) (England) Order 2001 SI 2001/608
- The Petty Sessions Areas (Divisions and Names) (Amendment) Regulations 2001 SI 2001/609
- The Magistrates' Courts (Amendment 2) Rules 2001 SI 2001/610
- The Costs in Criminal Cases (General) (Amendment) Regulations 2001 SI 2001/611
- The Local Government (Magistrates' Courts etc.) (Amendment) Order 2001 SI 2001/612
- The Criminal Appeal (Amendment) Rules 2001 SI 2001/613
- The Crown Court (Amendment) Rules 2001 SI 2001/614
- The Magistrates' Courts (Transfer of Justices' Clerks' Functions) (Miscellaneous Amendments) Rules 2001 SI 2001/615
- The Legal Aid in Criminal and Care Proceedings (General) (Amendment) Regulations 2001 SI 2001/616
- The Civil Legal Aid (General) (Amendment) Regulations 2001 SI 2001/617
- Access to Justice Act 1999 (Transfer of Justices' Clerks' Functions) Order 2001 SI 2001/618
- The Land Registration Rules 2001 SI 2001/619
- The Postal Services Commission (Register) Order 2001 SI 2001/620
- The Export Restrictions (Foot-And-Mouth Disease) (Amendment) Regulations 2001 SI 2001/627
- The Community Drivers' Hours (Foot-and-Mouth Disease) (Temporary Exception) Regulations 2001 SI 2001/628
- The Drivers' Hours (Goods Vehicles) (Milk Collection) (Temporary Exemption) Regulations 2001 SI 2001/629
- The Value Added Tax (Amendment) Regulations 2001 SI 2001/630
- The Social Security Revaluation of Earnings Factors Order 2001 SI 2001/631
- The Income Tax (Cash Equivalents of Car Fuel Benefits) Order 2001 SI 2001/635
- The Capital Gains Tax (Annual Exempt Amount) Order 2001 SI 2001/636
- The Retirement Benefits Schemes (Indexation of Earnings Cap) Order 2001 SI 2001/637
- The Income Tax (Indexation) Order 2001 SI 2001/638
- The Inheritance Tax (Indexation) Order 2001 SI 2001/639
- The Value Added Tax (Increase of Registration Limits) Order 2001 SI 2001/640
- The Diseases of Animals (Approved Disinfectants) (Amendment) (Wales) Order 2001 SI 2001/641
- The Pig Industry Restructuring Grant (Wales) Scheme 2001 SI 2001/643
- The European Communities (Lawyer's Practice) (Amendment) Regulations 2001 SI 2001/644
- The Solicitors' Incorporated Practices (Amendment) Order 2001 SI 2001/645
- The Amalgamation of the Denge and Southbrooks, Pett, Romney Marsh Levels, Rother and Walland Marsh Internal Drainage Districts Order 2000 SI 2001/646
- The Amalgamation of the South Gloucestershire and West Gloucestershire Internal Drainage Districts Order 2000 SI 2001/647
- The Postal Services Act 2000 (Consequential Modifications to Local Enactments 1) Order 2001 SI 2001/648
- The Sea Fish (Specified Sea Areas) (Regulation of Nets and Other Fishing Gear) Order 2001 SI 2001/649
- The Prohibition of Fishing with Multiple Trawls Order 2001 SI 2001/650
- The Disabled Facilities Grants and Home Repair Assistance (Maximum Amounts) (Amendment) (England) Order 2001 SI 2001/651
- The Social Security (Miscellaneous Amendments) (No. 2) Regulations 2001 SI 2001/652
- The Learning and Skills Act 2000 (Commencement 3 and Savings and Transitional Provisions) Order 2001 SI 2001/654
- The Carlisle Hospitals, the North Lakeland Healthcare and the West Cumbria Health Care National Health Service Trusts (Dissolution) Order 2001 SI 2001/655
- The North Cumbria Acute Hospitals National Health Service Trust (Establishment) Order 2001 SI 2001/656
- The South Gloucestershire Primary Care Trust (Establishment) Order 2001 SI 2001/657
- The Foot-and-Mouth Disease (Amendment) (Wales) (No. 2) Order 2001 SI 2001/658
- The Import and Export Restrictions (Foot-And-Mouth Disease) (Wales) Regulations 2001 SI 2001/659
- The European Communities (Matrimonial Jurisdiction and Judgments) (Northern Ireland) Regulations 2001 SI 2001/660
- The Environmental Protection (Waste Recycling Payments) (Amendment) (England) Regulations 2001 SI 2001/661
- The Climate Change Agreements (Eligible Facilities) Regulations 2001 SI 2001/662
- The Contaminated Land (England) (Amendment) Regulations 2001 SI 2001/663
- The Pensions Increase (Review) Order 2001 SI 2001/664
- The Import and Export Restrictions (Foot-And-Mouth Disease) Regulations 2001 SI 2001/665
- The Norfolk (Coroners' Districts) Order 2001 SI 2001/666
- The Value Added Tax (Amendment) (No. 2) Regulations 2001 SI 2001/677
- The Foot-and-Mouth Disease (Amendment) (England) (No. 2) Order 2001 SI 2001/680
- The Common Agricultural Policy (Wine) (England and Northern Ireland) Regulations 2001 SI 2001/686
- The Transport for London (Bus Lanes) Order 2001 SI 2001/690
- The Local Authorities (Goods and Services) (Public Bodies) (England) (No. 2) Order 2001 SI 2001/691
- The Education (Schools and Further and Higher Education) (Amendment) (England) Regulations 2001 SI 2001/692
- The Petty Sessions Areas (Amendment) Order 2001 SI 2001/694
- The Magistrates' Courts Committee Areas (Amendment) Order 2001 SI 2001/695
- The Justices of the Peace (Commission Areas) (Amendment) Order 2001 (SI 2001/696)
- The Children and Family Court Advisory and Support Service (Provision of Grants) Regulations 2001 (SI 2001/697)
- The Children and Family Court Advisory and Support Service (Conduct of Litigation and Exercise of Rights of Audience) Regulations 2001 (SI 2001/698)
- The Children and Family Court Advisory and Support Service (Membership, Committee and Procedure) (Amendment) Regulations 2001 (SI 2001/699)

=== 701–800 ===
- The M11 London–Cambridge Motorway (Redbridge–Stump Cross Section) Scheme 1970 (Revocation) Scheme 2001 (SI 2001/701)
- The M11 Motorway (Junction 8) Connecting Roads Scheme 2001 (SI 2001/702)
- The Court Funds (Amendment) Rules 2001 (SI 2001/703)
- The Public Record Office (Fees) Regulations 2001 (SI 2001/704)
- The National Health Service (General Dental Services) Amendment (No. 2) Regulations 2001 SI 2001/705
- The National Health Service (General Medical Services) Amendment Regulations 2001 SI 2001/706
- The National Health Service (Dental Charges) Amendment Regulations 2001 SI 2001/707
- The North and East Devon Health Authority (Transfer of Trust Property) Order 2001 SI 2001/708
- The Special Trustees for the Great Ormond Street Hospital for Children (Transfer of Trust Property) Order 2001 SI 2001/709
- The Special Trustees for the Royal London Hospital (Transfer of Trust Property) Order 2001 SI 2001/710
- The Special Trustees for St. Bartholomew's Hospital (Transfer of Trust Property) Order 2001 SI 2001/711
- The Royal Brompton and Harefield National Health Service Trust (Transfer of Trust Property) Order 2001 SI 2001/712
- The National Treatment Agency (Establishment and Constitution) Order 2001 SI 2001/713
- The Rampton Hospital Authority (Abolition) Order 2001 SI 2001/714
- The National Treatment Agency Regulations 2001 SI 2001/715
- The Calderdale Healthcare and the Huddersfield Health Care Services National Health Service Trusts (Dissolution) Order 2001 SI 2001/716
- The Calderdale and Huddersfield National Health Service Trust (Establishment) Order 2001 SI 2001/717
- The Wrightington, Wigan and Leigh National Health Service Trust (Establishment) Order 2001 SI 2001/718
- The Wigan and Leigh Health Services and the Wrightington Hospital National Health Service Trusts (Dissolution) Order 2001 SI 2001/719
- The Education (School Teachers' Pay and Conditions) Order 2001 SI 2001/720
- The Income Support (General) Amendment Regulations 2001 SI 2001/721
- The Local Authorities (Companies) (Amendment) (England) Order 2001 SI 2001/722
- The Local Authorities (Capital Finance, Approved Investments and Contracts—Amendment) (England) Regulations 2001 SI 2001/723
- The Local Government (Best Value) Performance Indicators and Performance Standards Order 2001 SI 2001/724
- The Gaming Act (Variation of Fees) (England and Wales) Order 2001 SI 2001/725
- The Gaming Act (Variation of Fees) (England and Wales and Scotland) Order 2001 SI 2001/726
- The Gaming (Bingo) Act (Fees) (Amendment) Order 2001 SI 2001/727
- The Lotteries (Gaming Board Fees) Order 2001 SI 2001/728
- The Export of Goods (Control) (Amendment) Order 2001 SI 2001/729
- The Wireless Telegraphy (Exemption) (Amendment) Regulations 2001 SI 2001/730
- The Care Standards Act 2000 (Commencement 3) (England) Order 2001 SI 2001/731
- The Value Added Tax (Protective Helmets) Order 2001 SI 2001/732
- The Inner London Court Staff Pensions Order 2001 SI 2001/733
- The Greater London Magistrates' Courts Authority (Accounts and Audit) Regulations 2001 SI 2001/734
- The Value Added Tax (Business Gifts of Small Value) Order 2001 SI 2001/735
- The Value Added Tax (Consideration for Fuel Provided for Private Use) Order 2001 SI 2001/736
- The Central Rating Lists (England) (Amendment) Regulations 2001 SI 2001/737
- The Housing Renewal Grants (Amendment) (England) Regulations 2001 SI 2001/739
- The Health Authorities (Establishment and Abolition) (England) Order 2001 SI 2001/740
- The National Health Service (Travelling Expenses and Remission of Charges) Amendment Regulations 2001 SI 2001/742
- The Retained Organs Commission (Establishment and Constitution) Order 2001 SI 2001/743
- The Protection of Children (Access to Lists) (Prescribed Individuals) (Amendment) Regulations 2001 SI 2001/744
- The Primary Care Trusts (Functions) (England) Amendment Regulations 2001 SI 2001/745
- The National Health Service (Charges for Drugs and Appliances) Amendment Regulations 2001 SI 2001/746
- The National Health Service (Functions of Health Authorities and Administration Arrangements) (England) Regulations 2001 SI 2001/747
- The Retained Organs Commission Regulations 2001 SI 2001/748
- The National Health Service (Optical Charges and Payments) Amendment Regulations 2001 SI 2001/749
- The Meat (Hygiene and Inspection) (Charges) (Amendment) (England) Regulations 2001 SI 2001/750
- Health Authorities (Membership and Procedure) Amendment (England) Regulations 2001 SI 2001/751
- The Value Added Tax (Passenger Vehicles) Order 2001 SI 2001/753
- The Value Added Tax (Vehicles Designed or Adapted for Handicapped Persons) Order 2001 SI 2001/754
- The Transport Act 2000 (Extinguishment of Loans) (Civil Aviation Authority) Order 2001 SI 2001/755
- The Government Resources and Accounts Act 2000 (Investment by Devolved Administrations) (Public-Private Partnership Business) Order 2001 SI 2001/756
- The Gaming Act (Variation of Monetary Limits) Order 2001 SI 2001/757
- The Welfare Food (Amendment) Regulations 2001 SI 2001/758
- The Value Added Tax (Electronic Communications) (Incentives) Regulations 2001 SI 2001/759
- The Local Authorities (Referendums) (Petitions and Directions) (England) (Amendment) Regulations 2001 SI 2001/760
- The Insolvency Fees (Amendment) Order 2001 SI 2001/761
- The Insolvency (Amendment) Regulations 2001 SI 2001/762
- The Insolvency (Amendment) Rules 2001 SI 2001/763
- The Insolvent Companies (Reports on Conduct of Directors) (Amendment) Rules 2001 SI 2001/764
- The Insolvent Companies (Disqualification of Unfit Directors) Proceedings (Amendment) Rules 2001 SI 2001/765
- The Insolvency Act 2000 (Commencement 1 and Transitional Provisions) Order 2001 SI 2001/766
- The Insolvent Partnerships (Amendment) Order 2001 SI 2001/767
- The Insolvent Companies (Reports on Conduct of Directors) (Scotland) (Amendment) Rules 2001 SI 2001/768
- The Social Security (Crediting and Treatment of Contributions, and National Insurance Numbers) Regulations 2001 SI 2001/769
- The Local Government Pension Scheme (Miscellaneous) Regulations 2001 SI 2001/770
- The Oxfordshire Community Health National Health Service Trust (Dissolution) Order 2001 SI 2001/771
- The Wireless Telegraphy (Television Licence Fees) (Amendment) Regulations 2001 SI 2001/772
- The Blood Tests (Evidence of Paternity) (Amendment) Regulations 2001 SI 2001/773
- The Child Support, Pensions and Social Security Act 2000 (Commencement 7) Order 2001 SI 2001/774
- The Children (Allocation of Proceedings) (Amendment) Order 2001 SI 2001/775
- The Magistrates' Courts (Blood Tests) (Amendment) Rules 2001 SI 2001/776
- The Family Law Reform Act 1987 (Commencement 3) Order 2001 SI 2001/777
- The Family Proceedings Courts (Family Law Act 1986) Rules 2001 SI 2001/778
- The Legal Aid Board (Abolition) Order 2001 SI 2001/779
- The Relocation Grants (Form of Application) (Amendment) (England) Regulations 2001 SI 2001/780
- The West Oxfordshire College (Dissolution) Order 2001 SI 2001/781
- The Education (Publication of Draft Proposals and Orders) (Further Education Corporations) (England) Regulations 2001 SI 2001/782
- The Learning and Skills Act 2000 (Consequential Amendments) (Schools) (England) Regulations 2001 SI 2001/783
- The Portsmouth City Primary Care Trust (Establishment) Order 2001 SI 2001/784
- The Rail Vehicle Accessibility (Midland Metro T69 Vehicles) Exemption Order 2001 SI 2001/785
- The Local Probation Boards (Miscellaneous Provisions) Regulations 2001 SI 2001/786
- The Road Traffic (Permitted Parking Area and Special Parking Area) (City of Plymouth) Order 2001 SI 2001/787
- The Street Works (Inspection Fees) (Amendment) (England) Regulations 2001 SI 2001/788
- The Housing Renewal Grants (Prescribed Form and Particulars) (Amendment) (England) Regulations 2001 SI 2001/789
- The County of Cumbria (Electoral Changes) (Amendment) Order 2001 SI 2001/790
- The Special Trustees for the Former United Birmingham Hospitals (Transfer of Trust Property) Revocation Order 2001 SI 2001/791
- The Special Trustees for the Former United Birmingham Hospitals (Transfer of Trust Property)2 Order 2001 SI 2001/792
- The National Health Service Appointments Commission (Establishment and Constitution) Order 2001 SI 2001/793
- The National Health Service Appointments Commission Regulations 2001 SI 2001/794
- The Medicines for Human Use and Medical Devices (Fees and Miscellaneous Amendments) Regulations 2001 SI 2001/795
- The Education Maintenance Allowance and School Access Funds (England) Grants Regulations 2001 SI 2001/797
- The School Organisation Proposals by the Learning and Skills Council for England Regulations 2001 SI 2001/798
- The Post–16 Education and Training Inspection Regulations 2001 SI 2001/799
- The Education (Bursaries for School Teacher Training Pilot Scheme) (England) (Amendment) Regulations 2001 SI 2001/800

=== 801–900 ===
- The A638 Trunk Road (North of Doncaster, St Mary's To Redhouse) (Detrunking) Order 2001 SI 2001/801
- The Air Passenger Duty (Designated Region of the United Kingdom) Order 2001 SI 2001/808
- The Air Passenger Duty (Connected Flights) (Amendment) Order 2001 SI 2001/809
- The Capital Allowances (Corresponding Northern Ireland Grants) Order 2001 SI 2001/810
- The Credit Unions (Increase in Limits on Deposits by persons too young to be members and of Periods for the Repayment of Loans) Order 2001 SI 2001/811
- The Insurance (Fees) Regulations 2001 SI 2001/812
- The Industrial and Provident Societies (Fees) Regulations 2001 SI 2001/813
- The Industrial and Provident Societies (Credit Unions) (Fees) Regulations 2001 SI 2001/814
- The Building Societies (General Charge and Fees) Regulations 2001 SI 2001/815
- The Friendly Societies (General Charge and Fees) Regulations 2001 SI 2001/816
- The Specified Risk Material (Amendment) (England) Regulations 2001 SI 2001/817
- The Family Proceedings Courts (Children Act 1989) (Amendment) Rules 2001 SI 2001/818
- The Adoption (Amendment) Rules 2001 SI 2001/819
- The Magistrates' Courts (Adoption) (Amendment) Rules 2001 SI 2001/820
- The Family Proceedings (Amendment) Rules 2001 SI 2001/821
- The Community Legal Service (Costs) (Amendment) Regulations 2001 SI 2001/822
- The Community Legal Service (Cost Protection) (Amendment) Regulations 2001 SI 2001/823
- The Court of Protection Rules 2001 SI 2001/824
- The Court of Protection (Enduring Powers of Attorney) Rules 2001 SI 2001/825
- The Education Standards Fund (England) Regulations 2001 SI 2001/826
- The Education (School Performance Targets) (England) (Amendment) Regulations 2001 SI 2001/827
- The Local Education Authority (Behaviour Support) (Amendment) (England) Regulations 2001 SI 2001/828
- The Legal Advice and Assistance (Amendment 2) Regulations 2001 SI 2001/829
- The Legal Aid in Family Proceedings (Remuneration) (Amendment) Regulations 2001 SI 2001/830
- The Community Legal Service (Funding) (Amendment) Order 2001 SI 2001/831
- The Education (Pupil Records) (Wales) Regulations 2001 SI 2001/832
- The National Health Service (General Medical Services) Amendment (Wales) Regulations 2001 SI 2001/833
- The Broadmoor Hospital Authority (Abolition) Order 2001 SI 2001/834
- The Parliamentary Pensions (Amendment) Regulations 2001 SI 2001/835
- The Air Passenger Duty (Amendment) Regulations 2001 SI 2001/836
- The Aircraft Operators (Accounts and Records) (Amendment) Regulations 2001 SI 2001/837
- The Climate Change Levy (General) Regulations 2001 SI 2001/838
- The Valuation for Rating (Plant and Machinery) (England) (Amendment) Regulations 2001 SI 2001/846
- The Rail Vehicle Accessibility (Gatwick Express Class 460 Vehicles) Exemption Order 2001 SI 2001/847
- The Rail Vehicle Accessibility (South West Trains Class 458 Vehicles) Exemption Order 2001 SI 2001/848
- The Road Traffic (Permitted Parking Area and Special Parking Area) (County of Wiltshire) (District of Salisbury) Order 2001 SI 2001/849
- The Criminal Justice and Court Services Act 2000 (Approved Premises) Regulations 2001 SI 2001/850
- Public Order, Northern Ireland The Public Processions (Northern Ireland) Act 1998 (Accounts and Audit) Order 1998 SI 2001/851
- The Public Processions (Northern Ireland) Act 1998 (Accounts and Audit) Order 2001 SI 2001/852
- The Transport Act 2000 (Civil Aviation Authority Pension Scheme) Order 2001 SI 2001/853
- The Criminal Defence Service (Funding) Order 2001 SI 2001/855
- The Criminal Defence Service (Recovery of Defence Costs Orders) Regulations 2001 SI 2001/856
- The Legal Services Commission (Disclosure of Information) (Amendment) Regulations 2001 SI 2001/857
- The National Savings Bank (Amendment) Regulations 2001 SI 2001/858
- The Social Security (Miscellaneous Amendments) (No. 3) Regulations 2001 SI 2001/859
- The Extensification Payment Regulations 2001 SI 2001/864
- The Immigration (European Economic Area) (Amendment) Regulations 2001 SI 2001/865
- The Redundancy Payments (Continuity of Employment in Local Government, etc.) (Modification) (Amendment) Order 2001 SI 2001/866
- The Immigration and Asylum Appeals (One-Stop Procedure) (Amendment) Regulations 2001 SI 2001/867
- The Immigration and Asylum Appeals (Notices) (Amendment) Regulations 2001 SI 2001/868
- The Transport Act 2000 (Commencement 5) Order 2001 SI 2001/869
- The Education (Amount to Follow Permanently Excluded Pupil) (Amendment) (England) Regulations 2001 SI 2001/870
- The Teachers' Pensions (Amendment) Regulations 2001 SI 2001/871
- The European Social Fund (National Assembly for Wales) Regulations 2001 SI 2001/872
- The Postal Services Act 2000 (Commencement 3 and Transitional and Saving Provisions) Order 2001 SI 2001/878
- The Import and Export Restrictions (Foot-And-Mouth Disease) (No. 2) (Wales) Regulations 2001 SI 2001/879
- The Biocidal Products Regulations 2001 SI 2001/880
- The Import and Export Restrictions (Foot-and-Mouth Disease) (No. 3) Regulations 2001 SI 2001/886
- The Foot-and-Mouth Disease (Export of Vehicles) (Disinfection of Tyres) Regulations 2001 SI 2001/887
- The North Cumbria Mental Health and Learning Disabilities National Health Service Trust (Establishment) Order 2001 SI 2001/888
- The Education (National Curriculum) (Key Stage 3 Assessment Arrangements) (Wales) (Amendment) Order 2001 SI 2001/889
- The Education (Individual Pupils' Achievements) (Information) (Wales) (Amendment) Regulations 2001 SI 2001/890
- The Education (Education Standards Grants) (Wales) Regulations 2001 SI 2001/891
- The Tax Credits (Miscellaneous Amendments 3) Regulations 2001 SI 2001/892
- The Tax Credits (Miscellaneous Amendments 3) (Northern Ireland) Regulations 2001 SI 2001/893
- The Road Traffic (Permitted Parking Area and Special Parking Area) (City of Salford) Order 2001 SI 2001/894
- The Professions Supplementary to Medicine (Registration Rules) (Amendment) Order of Council 2001 SI 2001/896

=== 901–1000 ===
- The Financing of Maintained Schools (England) (Amendment) Regulations 2001 SI 2001/907
- The Individual Savings Account (Amendment) Regulations 2001 SI 2001/908
- The Local Government Best Value (Exclusion of Non-commercial Considerations) Order 2001 SI 2001/909
- The Social Security Benefits Up-rating Regulations 2001 SI 2001/910
- The Social Security (Industrial Injuries) (Dependency) (Permitted Earnings Limits) Order 2001 SI 2001/911
- The Access to Justice Act 1999 (Commencement 7, Transitional Provisions and Savings) Order 2001 SI 2001/916
- The Rules of the Air (Amendment) Regulations 2001 SI 2001/917
- The Air Navigation (Dangerous Goods) (Amendment) Regulations 2001 SI 2001/918
- The Criminal Justice and Court Services Act 2000 (Commencement 4) Order 2001 SI 2001/919
- The Deregulation (Sunday Licensing) Order 2001 SI 2001/920
- The Licensing (Special Hours Certificates) (Amendment) Rules 2001 SI 2001/921
- The Buying Agency Trading Fund (Amendment) (Change of Name) Order 2001 SI 2001/922
- The Personal Equity Plan (Amendment) Regulations 2001 ( SI 2001/923
- The Fixed Penalty (Procedure) (Amendment) Regulations 2001 SI 2001/926
- The Limited Liability Partnerships (Forms) Regulations 2001 SI 2001/927
- The Billericay, Brentwood and Wickford Primary Care Trust (Establishment) Order 2001 SI 2001/928
- The Maldon and South Chelmsford Primary Care Trust (Establishment) Order 2001 SI 2001/929
- The North Hampshire, Loddon Community National Health Service Trust (Dissolution) Order 2001 SI 2001/930
- The Newcastle upon Tyne Hospitals National Health Service Trust (Establishment) Amendment Order 2001 SI 2001/931
- The City and Hackney Community Services, the Newham Community Health Services and the Tower Hamlets Healthcare National Health Service Trusts (Dissolution) Order 2001 SI 2001/932
- The Welfare Reform and Pensions Act 1999 (Commencement10, and Transitional Provisions) Order 2001 SI 2001/933
- The Stakeholder Pension Schemes (Amendment) (No.2) Regulations 2001 SI 2001/934
- The Pig Industry Development Scheme 2000 (Confirmation) Order 2001 SI 2001/935
- The Vehicle Excise Duty (Immobilisation, Removal and Disposal of Vehicles) (Amendment) Regulations 2001 SI 2001/936
- The Motor Vehicles (Driving Licences) (Amendment) (No. 3) Regulations 2001 SI 2001/937
- The Occupational and Personal Pension Schemes (Perpetuities and Contracting-out) Amendment Regulations 2001 SI 2001/943
- The Social Security (Hospital In-Patients) Amendment Regulations 2001 SI 2001/944
- The A650 Trunk Road (Drighlington Bypass) (Detrunking) Order 2001 SI 2001/945
- The Liberia (United Nations Sanctions) (Overseas Territories) Order 2001 SI 2001/946
- The Liberia (United Nations Sanctions) Order 2001 SI 2001/947
- The Liberia (United Nations Sanctions) (Isle of Man) Order 2001 SI 2001/948
- The Liberia (United Nations Sanctions) (Channel Islands) Order 2001 SI 2001/949
- The Community Legal Service (Financial) (Amendment) Regulations 2001 SI 2001/950
- The Education (Student Support) Regulations 2001 SI 2001/951
- The Proceeds of Crime (Scotland) Act 1995 (Enforcement of Scottish Confiscation Orders in England and Wales) Order 2001 SI 2001/953
- The Scotland Act 1998 (Transfer of Functions to the Scottish Ministers etc.) Order 2001 SI 2001/954
- The Education (Inspectors of Schools in England) Order 2001 SI 2001/955
- The Drug Trafficking Act 1994 (Designated Countries and Territories) (Amendment) Order 2001 SI 2001/956
- The Criminal Justice (International Co-operation) Act 1990 (Enforcement of Overseas Forfeiture Orders) (Amendment) Order 2001 SI 2001/957
- The Maximum Number of Judges (Northern Ireland) Order 2001 SI 2001/958
- The Sea Fish (Conservation) (Channel Islands) (Amendment) Order 2001 SI 2001/959
- The Criminal Justice Act 1988 (Designated Countries and Territories) (Amendment) Order 2001 SI 2001/960
- The European Communities (Designation) Order 2001 SI 2001/961
- The European Convention on Extradition Order 2001 SI 2001/962
- The EUTELSAT (Immunities and Privileges) (Amendment) Order 2001 SI 2001/963
- The Stamp Duty and Stamp Duty Reserve Tax (Definition of Unit Trust Scheme and Open-ended Investment Company) Regulations 2001 SI 2001/964
- The Social Security Contributions and Benefits (Northern Ireland) Act 1992 (Modification of Section 10(7)) Regulations 2001 SI 2001/965
- The Social Security Contributions and Benefits Act 1992 (Modification of Section 10(7)) Regulations 2001 SI 2001/966
- The Companies (Disqualification Orders) Regulations 2001 SI 2001/967
- The Foot-and-Mouth Disease (Amendment) (Wales) (No. 3) Order 2001 SI 2001/968
- The Limited Liability Partnerships (Fees) (No. 2) Regulations 2001 SI 2001/969
- New Deal (Miscellaneous Provisions) Order 2001 SI 2001/970
- The Education (Student Loans) (Repayment) (Amendment) Regulations 2001 SI 2001/971
- The Birmingham (Kitts Green and Shard End) Education Action Zone (Variation) Order 2001 SI 2001/972
- The Bristol Education Action Zone (Variation) Order 2001 SI 2001/973
- The Foot-and-Mouth Disease (Amendment) (England) (No. 3) Order 2001 SI 2001/974
- The Milk and Milk Products (Pupils in Educational Establishments) (England) Regulations 2001 SI 2001/994
- The Financial Services and Markets Act 2000 (Recognition Requirements for Investment Exchanges and Clearing Houses) Regulations 2001 SI 2001/995
- The Financial Services and Markets Act 2000 (Prescribed Markets and Qualifying Investments) Order 2001 SI 2001/996
- The Jobseeker's Allowance (Members of the Forces) (Joint Claims: Consequential Amendments) Regulations (Northern Ireland) 2001 SI 2001/998
- The Public Processions (Northern Ireland) Act 1998 (Accounts and Audit) Order (No. 2) 2001 SI 2001/999
- The Epicentre LEAP Ellesmere Port Cheshire Education Action Zone (Amendment) Order 2001 SI 2001/1000

=== 1001–1100 ===
- The Workmen's Compensation (Supplementation) (Amendment) Scheme 2001 SI 2001/1001
- The Housing Benefit and Council Tax Benefit (Decisions and Appeals) Regulations 2001 SI 2001/1002
- The Local Authorities (Changing Executive Arrangements and Alternative Arrangements) (England) Regulations 2001 SI 2001/1003
- The Social Security (Contributions) Regulations 2001 SI 2001/1004
- The National Assistance (Sums for Personal Requirements) (England) Regulations 2001 SI 2001/1005
- The Injuries in War (Shore Employments) Compensation (Amendment) Scheme 2001 SI 2001/1015
- The Borough of Rushmoor (Electoral Changes) Order 2001 SI 2001/1016
- The District of East Hampshire (Electoral Changes) Order 2001 SI 2001/1017
- The Borough of Test Valley (Electoral Changes) Order 2001 SI 2001/1018
- The Borough of Basingstoke and Deane (Electoral Changes) Order 2001 SI 2001/1019
- The Borough of Fareham (Electoral Changes) Order 2001 SI 2001/1020
- The Borough of Eastleigh (Parishes and Electoral Changes) Order 2001 SI 2001/1021
- The Borough of Gosport (Electoral Changes) Order 2001 SI 2001/1022
- The District of Hart (Parishes and Electoral Changes) Order 2001 SI 2001/1023
- The City of Southampton (Electoral Changes) Order 2001 SI 2001/1024
- The Borough of Havant (Electoral Changes) Order 2001 SI 2001/1025
- The District of New Forest (Parishes and Electoral Changes) Order 2001 SI 2001/1026
- The City of Portsmouth (Electoral Changes) Order 2001 SI 2001/1027
- The City of Winchester (Electoral Changes) Order 2001 SI 2001/1028
- The Social Security Amendment (New Deal) Regulations 2001 SI 2001/1029
- The Education (Nursery Education Training Grant) (England) Regulations 2001 SI 2001/1030
- The Pensions Appeal Tribunals (Additional Rights of Appeal) Regulations 2001 SI 2001/1031
- The Pensions Appeal Tribunals (Late Appeals) Regulations 2001 SI 2001/1032
- The Foot-and-Mouth Disease (Amendment) (Wales) (No. 4) Order 2001 SI 2001/1033
- The Import and Export Restrictions (Foot-And-Mouth Disease) (No. 3) (Wales) Regulations 2001 SI 2001/1034
- The Local Probation Boards (Appointments and Miscellaneous Provisions) Regulations 2001 SI 2001/1035
- The National Care Standards Commission (Membership and Procedure) Regulations 2001 SI 2001/1042
- The Road Vehicles (Construction and Use) (Amendment) (No. 2) Regulations 2001 SI 2001/1043
- The British Waterways Board (Limit for Borrowing) Order 2001 SI 2001/1054
- The Notification of New Substances (Amendment) Regulations 2001 SI 2001/1055
- The Regulation of Investigatory Powers (British Broadcasting Corporation) Order 2001 SI 2001/1057
- The Financial Services and Markets Act 2000 (Promotion of Collective Investment Schemes) (Exemptions) Order 2001 SI 2001/1060
- The Financial Services Act 1986 (Exemption) Order 2001 SI 2001/1061
- The Financial Services and Markets Act 2000 (Collective Investment Schemes) Order 2001 SI 2001/1062
- The National Assistance (Assessment of Resources) (Amendment) (No. 2) (England) Regulations 2001 SI 2001/1066
- The National Health Service (Professions Supplementary to Medicine) Amendment (Wales) Regulations 2001 SI 2001/1075
- The Community Charges, Council Tax and Non-Domestic Rating (Enforcement) (Magistrates' Courts) (Wales) Regulations 2001 SI 2001/1076
- The Community Legal Service (Funding) (Counsel in Family Proceedings) Order 2001 SI 2001/1077
- The Foot-and-Mouth Disease (Amendment) (England) (No. 4) Order 2001 SI 2001/1078
- The Road Vehicles (Display of Registration Marks) (Amendment) Regulations 2001 SI 2001/1079
- The Import and Export Restrictions (Foot-And-Mouth Disease) (No. 4) Regulations 2001 SI 2001/1080
- The Income Tax (Electronic Communications) (Miscellaneous Amendments) Regulations 2001 SI 2001/1081
- The Tax Credits (Miscellaneous Amendments 4) Regulations 2001 SI 2001/1082
- The Tax Credits (Miscellaneous Amendments 4) (Northern Ireland) Regulations 2001 SI 2001/1083
- National Health Service (General Ophthalmic Services) Amendment Regulations 2001 SI 2001/1084
- The Social Security (Inherited SERPS) Regulations 2001 SI 2001/1085
- The Portsmouth Harbour (Gunwharf Quays) (Millennium Tower) Order 2001 SI 2001/1086
- Limited Liability Partnerships Regulations 2001 SI 2001/1090
- The Offshore Combustion Installations (Prevention and Control of Pollution) Regulations 2001 SI 2001/1091
- The Social Security Commissioners (Procedure) (Amendment) Regulations 2001 SI 2001/1095
- The Licensing (Amendment of Various Rules) Rules 2001 SI 2001/1096
- The Police Act 1997 (Commencement 7) Order 2001 SI 2001/1097
- The Order Prescribing Forms under the Licensing Act 1902 (Amendment) Order 2001 SI 2001/1098
- The Isles of Scilly (Sale of Intoxicating Liquor) (Amendment) Order 2001 SI 2001/1099

=== 1101–1200 ===
- The Part-time Workers (Prevention of Less Favourable Treatment) Regulations 2001 SI 2001/1107
- The National Minimum Wage Regulations 1999 (Amendment) Regulations 2001 SI 2001/1108
- The Education (Pupil Registration) (Amendment) (Wales) Regulations 2001 SI 2001/1109
- The School Governors' Annual Reports (Wales) Regulations 2001 SI 2001/1110
- The Education (School Information) (Wales) (Amendment) Regulations 2001 SI 2001/1111
- The Plant Protection Products (Amendment) Regulations 2001 SI 2001/1112
- The Pesticides (Maximum Residue Levels in Crops, Food and Feeding Stuffs) (England and Wales) (Amendment) Regulations 2001 SI 2001/1113
- The Fees for Certificates of Arrest and Surrender of Deserters and Absentees (Army and Air Force) (Amendment) Regulations 2001 SI 2001/1115
- The Certificates of Arrest and Surrender (Royal Navy) (Amendment) Regulations 2001 SI 2001/1116
- The Fisheries and Aquaculture Structures (Grants) (England) Regulations 2001 SI 2001/1117
- The Social Security Amendment (Capital Disregards and Recovery of Benefits) Regulations 2001 SI 2001/1118
- The Industrial Training Levy (Construction Board) Order 2001 SI 2001/1120
- The Industrial Training Levy (Engineering Construction Board) Order 2001 SI 2001/1121
- The Capital Gains Tax (Gilt-edged Securities) Order 2001 SI 2001/1122
- The Income Tax (Car Benefits) (Reduction of Value of Appropriate Percentage) Regulations 2001 SI 2001/1123
- The National Assistance (Assessment of Resources) (Amendment) (No. 3) (England) Regulations 2001 SI 2001/1124
- The Road Vehicles (Authorised Weight) (Amendment) Regulations 2001 SI 2001/1125
- The Regulation of Investigatory Powers (Designation of Public Authorities for the Purposes of Intrusive Surveillance) Order 2001 SI 2001/1126
- The Foot-And-Mouth Disease (Ascertainment of Value) (Wales) Order 2001 SI 2001/1127
- The Employment Appeal Tribunal (Amendment) Rules 2001 SI 2001/1128
- The Housing Benefit (Permitted Totals) (Amendment) Order 2001 SI 2001/1129
- The Council Tax Benefit (Permitted Totals) (Amendment) Order 2001 SI 2001/1130
- The General Optical Council (Registration and Enrolment (Amendment) Rules) Order of Council 2001 SI 2001/1131
- The Postal Services Act 2000 (Determination of Turnover for Penalties) Order 2001 SI 2001/1135
- The Climate Change Levy (Electricity and Gas) Regulations 2001 SI 2001/1136
- The Climate Change Levy (Solid Fuel) Regulations 2001 SI 2001/1137
- The Climate Change Levy (Use as Fuel) Regulations 2001 SI 2001/1138
- The Climate Change Agreements (Energy-intensive Installations) Regulations 2001 SI 2001/1139
- The Climate Change Levy (Combined Heat and Power Stations) Prescribed Conditions and Efficiency Percentages Regulations 2001 SI 2001/1140
- The Tax Credits Up-rating Order 2001 SI 2001/1141
- The Foot-And-Mouth Disease (Ascertainment of Value) (Wales) (No.2) Order 2001 SI 2001/1142
- The Criminal Defence Service (Funding) (Amendment) Order 2001 SI 2001/1143
- The Criminal Defence Service (General) Regulations 2001 SI 2001/1144
- The Postal Services Act 2000 (Commencement 4 and Transitional and Saving Provisions) Order 2001 SI 2001/1148
- The Postal Services Act 2000 (Consequential Modifications 1) Order 2001 SI 2001/1149
- The National Health Service Trusts (Cardiff and Vale National Health Service Trust) (Originating Capital) (Wales) Order 2001 SI 2001/1153
- The Tir Mynydd (Cross-border Holdings) (Wales) Regulations 2001 SI 2001/1154
- The Double Taxation Relief (Taxes on Income) (Underlying Tax on Dividends and Dual Resident Companies) Regulations 2001 SI 2001/1156
- The Prison Service (Pay Review Body) Regulations 2001 SI 2001/1161
- The A43 Trunk Road (M1 Junction 15A Enhancement) Order 2001 SI 2001/1162
- The Double Taxation Relief (Surrender of Relievable Tax Within a Group) Regulations 2001 SI 2001/1163
- The A12 London–Great Yarmouth Trunk Road (A12/A14 Seven Hills Roundabout to South of Bascule Bridge) Detrunking Order 2001 SI 2001/1164
- The Defence Aviation Repair Agency Trading Fund Order 2001 SI 2001/1165
- The A140 North of Ipswich to Norwich Trunk Road (A14 Coddenham to A47 Norwich Southern Bypass) Detrunking Order 2001 SI 2001/1166
- The Discretionary Financial Assistance Regulations 2001 SI 2001/1167
- The Criminal Defence Service (Representation Order Appeals) Regulations 2001 SI 2001/1168
- The Criminal Defence Service (Choice in Very High Cost Cases) Regulations 2001 SI 2001/1169
- The Employment Tribunals (Constitution and Rules of Procedure) (Scotland) Regulations 2001 SI 2001/1170
- The Employment Tribunals (Constitution and Rules of Procedure) Regulations 2001 SI 2001/1171
- The West of Cornwall Primary Care Trust (Establishment) Order 2001 SI 2001/1175
- The Foot-And-Mouth Disease (Ascertainment of Value) (Wales) (No. 3) Order 2001 SI 2001/1176
- The Financial Services and Markets Act 2000 (Carrying on Regulated Activities by Way of Business) Order 2001 SI 2001/1177
- The National Health Service (General Medical Services) Amendment (No. 2) Regulations 2001 SI 2001/1178
- The Land Registration Fees Order 2001 SI 2001/1179
- The Legal Aid in Criminal and Care Proceedings (Costs) (Amendment) Regulations 2001 SI 2001/1180
- The Legal Advice and Assistance at Police Stations (Remuneration) (Amendment) Regulations 2001 SI 2001/1181
- The Legal Advice and Assistance (Amendment 3) Regulations 2001 SI 2001/1182
- The Pensions Appeal Tribunals (England and Wales) (Amendment 2) Rules 2001 SI 2001/1183
- The European Parliamentary Elections (Franchise of Relevant Citizens of the Union) Regulations 2001 SI 2001/1184
- The ACAS Arbitration Scheme (England and Wales) Order 2001 SI 2001/1185
- The Unfair Terms in Consumer Contracts (Amendment) Regulations 2001 SI 2001/1186
- The Employment Relations Act 1999 (Commencement 8) Order 2001 SI 2001/1187
- The Employment Protection (Continuity of Employment) (Amendment) Regulations 2001 SI 2001/1188
- The Social Security (Claims and Information and Work-focused Interviews for Lone Parents) Amendment Regulations 2001 SI 2001/1189
- The Housing Benefit (General) Amendment (No.2) Regulations 2001 SI 2001/1190
- The Import and Export Restrictions (Foot-and-Mouth Disease) (No. 4) (Amendment) Regulations 2001 SI 2001/1191
- The Rehabilitation of Offenders Act 1974 (Exceptions) (Amendment) Order 2001 SI 2001/1192
- The Care Standards Act 2000 (Commencement 4) (England) Order 2001 SI 2001/1193
- The Police Act 1997 (Criminal Records) (Registration) Regulations 2001 SI 2001/1194
- The School Standards and Framework Act 1998 (Commencement 8 and Supplemental Provisions) Order 2001 SI 2001/1195
- The Foot-and-Mouth Disease (Export of Vehicles) (Disinfection of Tyres) (Amendment) Regulations 2001 SI 2001/1196
- The King's Mill Centre for Health Care Services National Health Service Trust Change of Name and (Establishment) Amendment Order 2001 SI 2001/1197
- The West Hampshire National Health Service Trust (Establishment) Order 2001 SI 2001/1198
- The Merger (Fees) (Amendment) Regulations 2001 SI 2001/1199
- The Fossil Fuel Levy (Amendment) Regulations 2001 SI 2001/1200

=== 1201–1300 ===
- The Financial Services and Markets Act 2000 (Exemption) Order 2001 SI 2001/1201
- The Import and Export Restrictions (Foot-And-Mouth Disease) (No. 3) (Wales) (Amendment) Regulations 2001 SI 2001/1202
- The Non-Domestic Rating (Alteration of Lists and Appeals) (Amendment) (Wales) Regulations 2001 SI 2001/1203
- The Elections (Welsh Forms) Order 2001 SI 2001/1204
- The Weighing Equipment (Beltweighers) Regulations 2001 SI 2001/1208
- The Further Education Teachers' Qualifications (England) Regulations 2001 SI 2001/1209
- The Care Standards Act 2000 (Commencement 5) (England) Order 2001 SI 2001/1210
- The Teaching and Higher Education Act 1998 (Commencement 8) Order 2001 SI 2001/1211
- The Education (Pupil Information) (England) (Amendment) Regulations 2001 SI 2001/1212
- The General Teaching Council for England (Additional Functions) Order 2001 SI 2001/1214
- The Education Act 1997 (Commencement 4) Order 2001 SI 2001/1215
- The Human Rights Act (Amendment) Order 2001 SI 2001/1216
- The Financial Services and Markets Act 2000 (Appointed Representatives) Regulations 2001 SI 2001/1217
- The Occupational Pension Schemes (Pensions Compensation Provisions) Amendment Regulations 2001 SI 2001/1218
- The Welfare Reform and Pensions Act 1999 (Commencement 11) Order 2001 SI 2001/1219
- The Suffolk (Coroners' Districts) Order 2001 SI 2001/1220
- The Nottingham Community Health National Health Service Trust (Dissolution) Order 2001 SI 2001/1221
- The Road Traffic (Owner Liability) (Amendment) (No. 2) Regulations 2001 SI 2001/1222
- The Nottingham Healthcare and the Central Nottinghamshire Healthcare National Health Service Trusts (Dissolution) Order 2001 SI 2001/1223
- The South Buckinghamshire National Health Service Trust (Establishment) Amendment Order 2001 SI 2001/1224
- The Financial Services and Markets Act 2000 (Designated Professional Bodies) Order 2001 SI 2001/1226
- The Financial Services and Markets Act 2000 (Professions) (Non-Exempt Activities) Order 2001 SI 2001/1227
- The Open-Ended Investment Companies Regulations 2001 SI 2001/1228
- The Measuring Equipment (Cold-water Meters) (Amendment) Regulations 2001 SI 2001/1229
- The North and East Devon Partnership National Health Service Trust (Establishment) Order 2001 SI 2001/1230
- The Smoke Control Areas (Exempted Fireplaces) (Wales) Order 2001 SI 2001/1231
- The Food Irradiation Provisions (Wales) Regulations 2001 SI 2001/1232
- The Foot-And-Mouth Disease (Amendment) (Wales) (No.4) (Amendment) Order 2001 SI 2001/1234
- The Social Security (Widow's Benefit and Retirement Pensions) Amendment Regulations 2001 SI 2001/1235
- The Child Support (Civil Imprisonment) (Scotland) Regulations 2001 SI 2001/1236
- The Foot-and-Mouth Disease (Amendment) (England) (No. 4) (Amendment) Order 2001 SI 2001/1241
- The Foot-and-Mouth Disease (Ascertainment of Value) (No. 4) Order 2001 SI 2001/1242
- The Plymouth Community Services National Health Service Trust (Dissolution) Order 2001 SI 2001/1244
- The Exeter and District Community Health Service National Health Service Trust (Dissolution) Order 2001 SI 2001/1245
- The Defence Science and Technology Laboratory Trading Fund Order 2001 SI 2001/1246
- The Dorset Community National Health Service Trust (Dissolution) Order 2001 SI 2001/1247
- The Bath and West Community National Health Service Trust (Dissolution) Order 2001 SI 2001/1248
- The Essex and Herts Community, the Mid Essex Community and Mental Health, and the North East Essex Mental Health National Health Service Trusts (Dissolution) Order 2001 SI 2001/1249
- The Norwich Community Health Partnership National Health Service Trust (Dissolution) Order 2001 SI 2001/1250
- The Adoption of Children from Overseas Regulations 2001 SI 2001/1251
- The Child Support, Pensions and Social Security Act 2000 (Commencement 8) Order 2001 SI 2001/1252
- The Education (School Teachers' Pay and Conditions) (No.2) Order 2001 SI 2001/1254
- The Legal Aid in Family Proceedings (Remuneration) (Amendment 2) Regulations 2001 SI 2001/1255
- The Criminal Defence Service (Funding) (Amendment 2) Order 2001 SI 2001/1256
- The National Health Service Trusts (Originating Capital) Order 2001 SI 2001/1257
- The Camden and Islington Mental Health National Health Service Trust (Establishment) Order 2001 SI 2001/1258
- The Terrorism Act 2000 (Proscribed Organisations) (Amendment) Order 2001 SI 2001/1261
- The Plastic Materials and Articles in Contact with Food (Amendment) (Wales) Regulations 2001 SI 2001/1263
- The Housing Benefit and Council Tax Benefit (Decisions and Appeals) (Transitional and Savings) Regulations 2001 SI 2001/1264
- The Social Security Pensions (Home Responsibilities) (Amendment) Regulations 2001 SI 2001/1265
- The Teachers (Compulsory Registration) (England) Regulations 2001 SI 2001/1266
- The General Teaching Council for England (Registration of Teachers) (Amendment 2) Regulations 2001 SI 2001/1267
- The General Teaching Council for England (Disciplinary Functions) Regulations 2001 ( SI 2001/1268
- Education (Restriction of Employment) (Amendment) Regulations 2001 SI 2001/1269
- The General Teaching Council for England (Additional Functions) (Amendment) Order 2001 SI 2001/1270
- The Non-Domestic Rating (Alteration of Lists and Appeals) (Amendment) (England) Regulations 2001 SI 2001/1271
- The Adoption of Children from Overseas (Wales) Regulations 2001 SI 2001/1272
- The Foot-And-Mouth Disease (Ascertainment of Value) (Wales) (No. 4) Order 2001 SI 2001/1273
- The Learning and Skills Act 2000 (Commencement 3 and Transitional Provisions) (Wales) Order 2001 SI 2001/1274
- The Disabled Facilities Grants and Home Repair Assistance (Maximum Amounts) (Amendment) (Wales) Order 2001 SI 2001/1275
- The Adoption (Intercountry Aspects) Act 1999 (Commencement 5) Order 2001 SI 2001/1279
- The Local Authorities (Members' Allowances) (England) Regulations 2001 SI 2001/1280
- The Street Works (Charges for Unreasonably Prolonged Occupation of the Highway) (England) Regulations 2001 SI 2001/1281
- The Financial Services and Markets Act 2000 (Commencement 2) Order 2001 SI 2001/1282
- The Financial Services and Markets Act 2000 (Dissolution of the Insurance Brokers Registration Council) (Consequential Provisions) Order 2001 SI 2001/1283
- The Education (School Teachers' Pay and Conditions) (No. 3) Order 2001 SI 2001/1284
- Education (Teacher Training Hardship Grants) (England) Regulations 2001 SI 2001/1285
- The Education (National Curriculum) (Assessment Arrangements) (England) (Amendment) Order 2001 SI 2001/1286
- The Local Authorities (Capital Finance) (Rate of Discount for 2001/2002) (Wales) Regulations 2001 SI 2001/1287
- The Horizon and the West Herts Community Health National Health Service Trusts (Dissolution) Order 2001 SI 2001/1288
- The Mancunian Community Health National Health Service Trust (Dissolution) Order 2001 SI 2001/1289
- The Bay Community National Health Service Trust (Dissolution) Order 2001 SI 2001/1290
- The Northampton Community Healthcare and the Rockingham Forest National Health Service Trusts (Dissolution) Order 2001 SI 2001/1291
- The Transport Act 2000 (Designation of Transferee) Order 2001 SI 2001/1292
- The Community Drivers' Hours (Foot-and-Mouth Disease) (Temporary Exception) (No. 2) Regulations 2001 (SI 2001/1293)
- The Northern Ireland Act 1998 (Designation of Public Authorities) Order 2001 (SI 2001/1294)
- Bridgend Valleys Railway Order 2001 (SI 2001/1295)
- The Justices and Justices' Clerks (Costs) Regulations 2001 SI 2001/1296
- The Local Authorities (Conduct of Referendums) (England) Regulations 2001 (SI 2001/1298)
- The Local Authorities (Alternative Arrangements) (England) Regulations 2001 (SI 2001/1299)
- The National Health Service (Penalty Charge) (Wales) Regulations 2001 (SI 2001/1300)

=== 1301–1400 ===
- The Housing (Preservation of Right to Buy) (Amendment) (Wales) Regulations 2001 SI 2001/1301
- The Meat (Hygiene and Inspection) (Charges) (Amendment) (Wales) Regulations 2001 SI 2001/1302
- The Restriction on Pithing (Wales) Regulations 2001 SI 2001/1303
- The General Commissioners of Income Tax (Costs) Regulations 2001 SI 2001/1304
- The Social Security (Incapacity Benefit) Amendment Regulations 2001 SI 2001/1305
- The Local Authorities (Referendums) (Petitions and Directions) (England) (Amendment) (No. 2) Regulations 2001 SI 2001/1310
- The Ravensbourne Priority Health National Health Service Trust (Dissolution) Order 2001 SI 2001/1313
- The Weights and Measures (Intoxicating Liquor) (Amendment) Order 2001 SI 2001/1322
- The Additional Pension and Social Security Pensions (Home Responsibilities) (Amendment) Regulations 2001 SI 2001/1323
- The Housing Benefit (General) Amendment (No. 3) Regulations 2001 SI 2001/1324
- The Rent Officers (Housing Benefit Functions) (Amendment) Order 2001 SI 2001/1325
- The Rent Officers (Housing Benefit Functions) (Scotland) (Amendment) Order 2001 SI 2001/1326
- The Electoral Commission (Limit on Public Awareness Expenditure) Order 2001 SI 2001/1329
- The Barnet, Enfield and Haringey Mental Health National Health Service Trust (Establishment) Order 2001 SI 2001/1330
- The Barnet Community Healthcare, the Enfield Community Care and the Haringey Health Care National Health Service Trusts (Dissolution) Order 2001 SI 2001/1331
- The Slaughter Premium (Wales) Regulations 2001 SI 2001/1332
- The Tax Credits (New Deal Consequential Amendments) (Northern Ireland) Regulations 2001 SI 2001/1333
- The Tax Credits (New Deal Consequential Amendments) Regulations 2001 SI 2001/1334
- The Financial Services and Markets Act 2000 (Financial Promotion) Order 2001 SI 2001/1335
- The Local Government (Best Value Performance Indicators) (Wales) Order 2001 SI 2001/1337
- The South Wales Sea Fisheries District (Variation) 2001 SI 2001/1338
- The Education (Adjudicators Inquiry Procedure etc.) (Amendment) Regulations 2001 SI 2001/1339
- The Bretton Hall Higher Education Corporation (Dissolution) Order 2001 SI 2001/1340
- The Dual-Use Items (Export Control) (Amendment) Regulations 2001 SI 2001/1344
- The Non-Domestic Rating (Public Houses and Petrol Filling Stations) (England) Order 2001 SI 2001/1345
- The Non-Domestic Rating (Rural Settlements) (England) (Amendment) Order 2001 SI 2001/1346
- The Leeds Supertram (Extension) Order 2001 SI 2001/1347
- The Leeds Supertram (Land Acquisition and Road Works) Order 2001 SI 2001/1348
- The Financial Markets and Insolvency (Settlement Finality) (Revocation) Regulations 2001 SI 2001/1349
- The Tax Credits (Miscellaneous Amendments 5) (Northern Ireland) Regulations 2001 SI 2001/1350
- The Tax Credits (Miscellaneous Amendments 5) Regulations 2001 SI 2001/1351
- The Foot-and-Mouth Disease (Export of Vehicles) (Disinfection of Tyres) (Amendment) (No. 2) Regulations 2001 SI 2001/1352
- The Greater London Road Traffic (Various Provisions) Order 2001 SI 2001/1353
- The Social Security (Minimum Contributions to Appropriate Personal Pension Schemes) Order 2001 SI 2001/1354
- The Social Security (Reduced Rates of Class 1 Contributions, and Rebates) (Money Purchase Contracted-out Schemes) Order 2001 SI 2001/1355
- The Social Security (Reduced Rates of Class 1 Contributions) (Salary Related Contracted-out Schemes) Order 2001 SI 2001/1356
- The Import and Export Restrictions (Foot-And-Mouth Disease) (Wales) (No.4) Regulations 2001 SI 2001/1357
- National Health Service (Charges for Drugs and Appliances) (Wales) Regulations 2001 SI 2001/1358
- The National Health Service (General Dental Services) and (Dental Charges) (Amendment) (Wales) Regulations 2001 SI 2001/1359
- The Beef Labelling (Enforcement) (Wales) Regulations 2001 SI 2001/1360
- The Spreadable Fats (Marketing Standards) (Wales) Regulations 2001 SI 2001/1361
- National Health Service (Optical Charges and Payments) and (General Ophthalmic Services) (Amendment) (Wales) Regulations 2001 SI 2001/1362
- The Import and Export Restrictions (Foot-And-Mouth Disease) (No. 5) Regulations 2001 SI 2001/1366
- The Greater Manchester (Light Rapid Transit System) (Trafford Park) Order 2001 SI 2001/1367
- The Greater Manchester (Light Rapid Transit System) (Mumps Surface Crossing) Order 2001 SI 2001/1368
- The Greater Manchester (Light Rapid Transit System) (Land Acquisition) Order 2001 SI 2001/1369
- Suckler Cow Premium Regulations 2001 SI 2001/1370
- The Financial Services (EEA Passport Rights) Regulations 2001 SI 2001/1376
- The Waddeton Fishery Order 2001 SI 2001/1380
- The Shellfish (Specification of Crustaceans) Regulations 2001 SI 2001/1381
- The County Court Fees (Amendment) Order 2001 SI 2001/1385
- The Enforcement of Road Traffic Debts (Amendment) Order 2001 SI 2001/1386
- The High Court and County Courts Jurisdiction (Amendment) Order 2001 SI 2001/1387
- The Civil Procedure (Amendment 2) Rules 2001 SI 2001/1388
- The Partnerships (Unrestricted Size) 16 Regulations 2001 SI 2001/1389
- The Education (Induction Arrangements for School Teachers) (England) (Amendment 2) Regulations 2001 SI 2001/1390
- The Education (Teachers' Qualifications and Health Standards) (England) (Amendment) Regulations 2001 SI 2001/1391
- The Teacher Training Agency (Additional Functions) Order 2001 SI 2001/1392
- The Immigration and Asylum Act 1999 (Part V Exemption: Eligible Voluntary Bodies and Relevant Employers) Order 2001 SI 2001/1393
- The Immigration and Asylum Act 1999 (Commencement 10) Order 2001 SI 2001/1394
- The Social Security (Breach of Community Order) Regulations 2001 SI 2001/1395
- The National Health Service (Pharmaceutical Services) (Amendment) (Wales) 2001 SI 2001/1396
- National Health Service (Travelling Expenses and Remission of Charges) (Amendment) (Wales) Regulations 2001 SI 2001/1397
- The Scottish Parliament (Elections etc.) (Amendment) Order 2001 SI 2001/1399
- The Scotland Act 1998 (Consequential Modifications) Order 2001 SI 2001/1400

=== 1401–1500 ===
- The Relevant Authorities (General Principles) Order 2001 SI 2001/1401
- The Southend on Sea Primary Care Trust (Establishment) Amendment Order 2001 SI 2001/1402
- The Immigration and Asylum Act 1999 (Part V Exemption: Educational Institutions and Health Sector Bodies) Order 2001 SI 2001/1403
- The New Opportunities Fund (Specification of Initiatives) Order 2001 SI 2001/1404
- The Education (School Organisation Proposals) (England) (Amendment) Regulations 2001 SI 2001/1405
- The Foot-and-Mouth Disease (Amendment)(Wales)(No.5) Order 2001 SI 2001/1406
- The Foot-and-Mouth Disease (Amendment) (England) (No. 5) Order 2001 SI 2001/1407
- The National Assistance (Sums for Personal Requirements) (Wales) Regulations 2001 SI 2001/1408
- The National Assistance (Assessment of Resources) (Amendment 2) (Wales) Regulations 2001 SI 2001/1409
- The Countryside and Rights of Way Act 2000 (Commencement 2) (Wales) Order 2001 SI 2001/1410
- The Local Government Act 2000 (Commencement) (No. 2) (Wales) Order 2001 SI 2001/1411
- The Patents (Amendment) Rules 2001 SI 2001/1412
- The Financial Services and Markets Act 2000 (Service of Notices) Regulations 2001 SI 2001/1420
- The Financial Services Act 1986 (Extension of Scope of Act and Meaning of Collective Investment Scheme) Order 2001 SI 2001/1421
- The Stop Now Orders (E.C. Directive) Regulations 2001 SI 2001/1422
- National Health Service (Optical Charges and Payments) and (General Ophthalmic Services) (Amendment) (No.2) (Wales) Regulations 2001 SI 2001/1423
- The General Teaching Council for Wales (Disciplinary Functions) Regulations 2001 SI 2001/1424
- The Inner London Court Staff Pensions (Amendment) Order 2001 SI 2001/1425
- The Transportable Pressure Vessels Regulations 2001 SI 2001/1426
- The Road Traffic (Permitted Parking Area and Special Parking Area) (Borough of Southend-on-Sea) Order 2001 SI 2001/1427
- The National Health Service (Pension Scheme and Additional Voluntary Contributions) (Pension Sharing) Amendment Regulations 2001 SI 2001/1428
- The Education (School Day and School Year) (England) (Amendment) Regulations 2001 SI 2001/1429
- The Jobseeker's Allowance (Amendment) Regulations 2001 SI 2001/1434
- The Greenwich Healthcare National Health Service Trust Change of Name and (Establishment) Amendment Order 2001 SI 2001/1435
- The Immigration (Restrictions on Employment) (Code of Practice) Order 2001 SI 2001/1436
- The Criminal Defence Service (General) (No. 2) Regulations 2001 SI 2001/1437
- The Ancient Monuments (Applications for Scheduled Monument Consent) (Welsh Forms and Particulars) Regulations 2001 SI 2001/1438
- The Valuation Tribunals (Amendment) (Wales) Regulations 2001 SI 2001/1439
- The Coffee Extracts and Chicory Extracts (Wales) Regulations 2001 SI 2001/1440
- The District of Cannock Chase (Electoral Changes) Order 2001 SI 2001/1442
- The Borough of East Staffordshire (Electoral Changes) Order 2001 SI 2001/1443
- The District of Lichfield (Electoral Changes) Order 2001 SI 2001/1444
- The Borough of Newcastle-under-Lyme (Electoral Changes) Order 2001 SI 2001/1445
- The District of South Staffordshire (Electoral Changes) Order 2001 SI 2001/1446
- The Borough of Stafford (Electoral Changes) Order 2001 SI 2001/1447
- The District of Staffordshire Moorlands (Electoral Changes) Order 2001 SI 2001/1448
- The City of Stoke-on-Trent (Electoral Changes) Order 2001 SI 2001/1449
- The Borough of Tamworth (Electoral Changes) Order 2001 SI 2001/1450
- The Channel Tunnel Rail Link (Stratford Station and Subsidiary Works) Order 2001 SI 2001/1451
- The Civil Aviation Act 1982 (Overseas Territories) Order 2001 SI 2001/1452
- The European Convention on Extradition (Fiscal Offences) Order 2001 SI 2001/1453
- The Local Authorities (Armorial Bearings) Order 2001 SI 2001/1454
- The Education (Inspectors of Education and Training in Wales) Order 2001 SI 2001/1455
- The Scotland Act 1998 (Modification of Schedule 5) Order 2001 SI 2001/1456
- The Employment Tribunals (Constitution and Rules of Procedure) (Amendment) Regulations 2001 SI 2001/1459
- The Employment Tribunals (Constitution and Rules of Procedure) (Scotland) (Amendment) Regulations 2001 SI 2001/1460
- The Employment Relations Act 1999 (Commencement 8) (Amendment) Order 2001 SI 2001/1461
- The Local Government Act 2000 (Commencement) (No. 2) (Wales) Order 2001 SI 2001/1471
- The Employment Appeal Tribunal (Amendment) Rules 2001 (Amendment) Rules 2001 SI 2001/1476
- The A15 Trunk Road (North of the M180 Motorway Junction 5 including the Link Road to the A63 Trunk Road) (Detrunking) Order 2001 SI 2001/1477
- The Waste (Foot-and-Mouth Disease) (England) Regulations 2001 SI 2001/1478
- The Local Government Pension Scheme (Amendment) Regulations 2001 SI 2001/1481
- The Local Authorities (Conduct of Referendums) (England) (Consequential Amendment) Order 2001 SI 2001/1494
- The Thurrock and Basildon College (Incorporation) Order 2001 SI 2001/1497
- The Transport Act 2000 (Commencement 6) Order 2001 SI 2001/1498
- The Foot-and-Mouth Disease (Export of Vehicles) (Disinfection of Tyres) (Amendment) (No. 3) Regulations 2001 SI 2001/1499
- The Import and Export Restrictions (Foot-and-Mouth Disease) (Wales) (No.5) Regulations 2001 SI 2001/1500

=== 1501–1600 ===
- The Housing (Right to Acquire) (Discount) Order 2001 SI 2001/1501
- The Import and Export Restrictions (Foot-And-Mouth Disease) (No. 6) Regulations 2001 SI 2001/1502
- The Prescribed Waste (Wales) Regulations 2001 SI 2001/1506
- The Thurrock and Basildon College (Government) Regulations 2001 ( SI 2001/1507
- The Foot-and-Mouth Disease (Marking of Meat and Meat Products) (Wales) Regulations 2001 SI 2001/1508
- The Foot-and-Mouth Disease (Amendment)(Wales)(No.6) Order 2001 SI 2001/1509
- The Foot-and-Mouth Disease (Marking of Meat and Meat Products) Regulations 2001 SI 2001/1512
- The Artificial Insemination of Cattle (Emergency Licences) (England) Regulations 2001 SI 2001/1513
- The Foot-and-Mouth Disease (Amendment) (England) (No. 6) Order 2001 SI 2001/1514
- The Rendering (Fluid Treatment) (England) Order 2001 SI 2001/1515
- The A361 Trunk Road (Southam Road) (Detrunking) Order 2001 SI 2001/1516
- The Local Authorities (Executive Arrangements) (Modification of Enactments and Further Provisions) (England) Order 2001 SI 2001/1517
- The A423 Trunk Road (Ryton-on-Dunsmore Roundabout to the A361 Southam Road/A422 Hennef Way Roundabout) (Detrunking) Order 2001 SI 2001/1518
- The Armed Forces Act 1996 (Commencement 4) Order 2001 SI 2001/1519
- The Royal Marines Terms of Service (Amendment) Regulations 2001 SI 2001/1520
- The Royal Navy Terms of Service (Ratings) (Amendment) Regulations 2001 SI 2001/1521
- The Income Tax (Sub-contractors in the Construction Industry) (Amendment) Regulations 2001 SI 2001/1531
- The Rowley Regis College (Dissolution) Order 2001 SI 2001/1532
- The St Austell College (Dissolution) Order 2001 SI 2001/1533
- The Financial Services and Markets Act 2000 (Transitional Provisions and Savings) (Rules) Order 2001 SI 2001/1534
- The Hillingdon Primary Care Trust (Establishment) Amendment Order 2001 SI 2001/1535
- The Care Standards Act 2000 (Commencement 6) (England) Order 2001 SI 2001/1536
- The South Tees Acute Hospitals National Health Service Trust Change of Name and (Establishment) Amendment Order 2001 SI 2001/1537
- The Lowestoft Primary Care Trust (Establishment) Amendment Order 2001 SI 2001/1538
- The Artificial Insemination of Cattle (Emergency Licences) (Wales) Regulations 2001 SI 2001/1539
- The National Health Service (Payments by Local Authorities to Health Authorities) (Prescribed Functions) (Wales) Regulations 2001 SI 2001/1543
- The Channel Tunnel (International Arrangements) (Amendment 3) Order 2001 SI 2001/1544
- The A45 Trunk Road (Packington Crossroads Junction Improvement Slip Roads) Order 2001 SI 2001/1545
- The Kingston upon Hull City Council (Millennium Bridge) Scheme 2000 Confirmation Instrument 2001 SI 2001/1546
- The Motor Cycles Etc. (EC Type Approval) (Amendment) (No. 2) Regulations 2001 SI 2001/1547
- The Gelatine (Intra-Community Trade) (England) Regulations 2001 SI 2001/1553
- The Superannuation (Admission to Schedule 1 to the Superannuation Act 1972) Order 2001 SI 2001/1587

=== 1601–1700 ===
- The Housing Benefit and Council Tax Benefit (Decisions and Appeals and Discretionary Financial Assistance) (Consequential Amendments and Revocations) Regulations 2001 SI 2001/1605
- The Southern Derbyshire Mental Health National Health Service Trust Change of Name and (Establishment) Amendment Order 2001 SI 2001/1606
- The Air Navigation (Restriction of Flying) (Nuclear Installations) Regulations 2001 SI 2001/1607
- The Community Health Services, Southern Derbyshire National Health Service Trust (Dissolution) Order 2001 SI 2001/1612
- The Northern Ireland Arms Decommissioning Act 1997 (Amnesty Period) Order 2001 SI 2001/1622
- The Pollution Prevention and Control (Foot-and-Mouth Disease) (Air Curtain Incinerators) (England and Wales) Regulations 2001 SI 2001/1623
- The Southampton East Healthcare Primary Care Trust Change of Name and (Establishment) Amendment Order 2001 SI 2001/1624
- The North Mersey Community National Health Service Trust (Establishment) Amendment Order 2001 SI 2001/1625
- The Education (Student Loans) (Amendment) (England and Wales) Regulations 2001 SI 2001/1627
- The Elections Act 2001 (Supplemental Provisions) Order 2001 SI 2001/1630
- The Sea Fishing (Enforcement of Community Quota and Third Country Fishing Measures) Order 2001 SI 2001/1631
- The Freedom of Information Act 2000 (Commencement 1) Order 2001 SI 2001/1637
- The Merchant Shipping(Miscellaneous Amendments)Regulations 2001 SI 2001/1638
- The Merchant Shipping (Oil Pollution Preparedness, Response and Cooperation Convention) (Amendment) Regulations 2001 SI 2001/1639
- The Products of Animal Origin (Import and Export) (Amendment) (England) Regulations 2001 SI 2001/1640
- The Education (Induction Arrangements for School Teachers) (Amendment 3) (England) Regulations 2001 SI 2001/1642
- The BSE Monitoring (England) Regulations 2001 SI 2001/1644
- The Medicines (Veterinary Drugs) (General Sale List) Order 2001 SI 2001/1645
- The Medicines (Veterinary Drugs) (Prescription Only) Order 2001 SI 2001/1646
- The Motor Vehicles (Tests) (Amendment) Regulations 2001 SI 2001/1648
- The Public Service Vehicles (Conditions of Fitness, Equipment, Use and Certification) (Amendment) Regulations 2001 SI 2001/1649
- The Goods Vehicles (Plating and Testing) (Amendment) Regulations 2001 SI 2001/1650
- The Criminal Justice and Court Services Act 2000 (Commencement 6) Order 2001 SI 2001/1651
- The Vaccine Damage Payments (Specified Disease) Order 2001 SI 2001/1652
- The Access to Justice Act 1999 (Commencement 8) Order 2001 SI 2001/1655
- The Children (Allocation of Proceedings) (Amendment 2) Order 2001 SI 2001/1656
- The Air Navigation (Restriction of Flying) (Prisons) Regulations 2001 SI 2001/1657
- The Parliamentary Elections (Returning Officer's Charges) (Northern Ireland) (Amendment) Order 2001 SI 2001/1659
- The Products of Animal Origin (Import and Export) (Amendment) (Wales) Regulations 2001 SI 2001/1660
- The Teddington Memorial Hospital and Community National Health Service Trust (Dissolution) Order 2001 SI 2001/1663
- The Kingston and District Community National Health Service Trust (Dissolution) Order 2001 SI 2001/1664
- The Halton General Hospital and the Warrington Hospital National Health Service Trusts (Dissolution) Order 2001 SI 2001/1665
- The Salford Community Health Care National Health Service Trust (Dissolution) Order 2001 SI 2001/1666
- The Medicines (Products for Animal Use—Fees) (Amendment) Regulations 2001 SI 2001/1669
- The National Health Service (General Dental Services) Amendment (No. 3) Regulations 2001 SI 2001/1677
- The National Health Service (Functions of Health Authorities) (General Dental Services Incentive Schemes) Regulations 2001 SI 2001/1678
- The Infant Formula and Follow-on Formula (Amendment) (Wales) Regulations 2001 SI 2001/1690
- The Processed Cereal-based Foods and Baby Foods for Infants and Young Children (Amendment) (Wales) Regulations 2001 SI 2001/1691
- The Representation of the People (England and Wales) (Amendment) Regulations 2001 SI 2001/1700

=== 1701–1800 ===
- The Noise Emission in the Environment by Equipment for use Outdoors Regulations 2001 SI 2001/1701
- The Veterinary Surgeons (Examination of Commonwealth and Foreign Candidates) Regulations Order of Council 2001 SI 2001/1703
- The Animal By-Products (Amendment) (England) Order 2001 SI 2001/1704
- The Sex Offenders (Notification Requirements) (Prescribed Police Stations) Regulations 2001 SI 2001/1708
- The Agricultural or Forestry Tractors and Tractor Components (Type Approval) (Amendment) Regulations 2001 SI 2001/1710
- The Social Security (Breach of Community Order) (Consequential Amendments) Regulations 2001 SI 2001/1711
- The Tobacco Products Regulations 2001 SI 2001/1712
- The Education (Student Support) Regulations 2001 (Amendment) Regulations 2001 SI 2001/1730
- The Education (Mandatory Awards) Regulations 2001 SI 2001/1734
- The Animal By-Products (Amendment) (Wales) Order 2001 SI 2001/1735
- The Parliamentary Elections (Returning Officers' Charges) Order 2001 SI 2001/1736
- The Foot-and-Mouth Disease (Marking of Meat, Minced Meat and Meat Preparations) Regulations 2001 SI 2001/1739
- The Foot-and-Mouth Disease (Marking of Meat, Minced Meat and Meat Preparations) (Wales) Regulations 2001 SI 2001/1740
- The National Patient Safety Agency Regulations 2001 SI 2001/1742
- The National Patient Safety Agency (Establishment and Constitution) Order 2001 SI 2001/1743
- The General Social Care Council (Appointments and Procedure) Regulations 2001 SI 2001/1744
- The National Blood Authority (Establishment and Constitution) Amendment Order 2001 SI 2001/1745
- The National Health Service (General Dental Services) Amendment (No. 4) Regulations 2001 SI 2001/1746
- The Rail Vehicle Accessibility (Great Western Trains Company Class 180 Vehicles) Exemption Order 2001 SI 2001/1747
- The Scottish Parliament (Elections etc.) (Amendment) (No. 2) Order 2001 SI 2001/1748
- The Representation of the People (Scotland) (Amendment) Regulations 2001 SI 2001/1749
- The Scottish Parliament (Elections etc.) (Amendment) (No. 3) Order 2001 SI 2001/1750
- The Insolvency Act 2000 (Commencement 2) Order 2001 SI 2001/1751
- The Dismissal Procedures Agreement Designation (Electrical Contracting Industry) Order 1991 Revocation Order 2001 SI 2001/1752
- The Offshore Petroleum Activities (Conservation of Habitats) Regulations 2001 SI 2001/1754
- The Government of Wales Act 1998 (Commencement6)Order 2001 SI 2001/1756
- The General Insurance Reserves (Tax) Regulations 2001 SI 2001/1757
- The Railways (Closure Provisions) (Exemptions) (St. Pancras) Order 2001 SI 2001/1768
- The Civil Procedure (Amendment 3) Rules 2001 SI 2001/1769
- The Foot-and-Mouth Disease (Marking of Meat, Meat Products, Minced Meat and Meat Preparations) Regulations 2001 SI 2001/1771
- The Import and Export Restrictions (Foot-And-Mouth Disease) (No. 7) Regulations 2001 SI 2001/1772
- The Home-Grown Cereals Authority (Rate of Levy)Order 2001 SI 2001/1773
- The Elections Act 2001 (Supplemental Provisions) (No. 2) Order 2001 SI 2001/1774
- The Child Support (Miscellaneous Amendments) Regulations 2001 SI 2001/1775
- The Utilities Act 2000 (Commencement 4 and Transitional Provisions) (Amendment) Order 2001 SI 2001/1780
- The Utilities Act 2000 (Commencement 5 and Transitional Provisions) Order 2001 SI 2001/1781
- The Utilities Act 2000 (Transitional Provisions) Regulations 2001 SI 2001/1782
- The Financial Services and Markets Act 2000 (Compensation Scheme: Electing Participants) Regulations 2001 SI 2001/1783
- The Education (Nutritional Standards for School Lunches) (Wales)Regulations 2001 SI 2001/1784
- The Income Support and Jobseeker's Allowance (Amounts for Persons in Residential Care and Nursing Homes) Regulations 2001 SI 2001/1785
- The Housing (Right to Buy) (Priority of Charges) (Wales) Order 2001 SI 2001/1786
- The Miscellaneous Food Additives (Amendment) (Wales) Regulations 2001 SI 2001/1787
- The National Health Service (General Medical Services) Amendment (No.2) (Wales) Regulations 2001 SI 2001/1788
- The Road Traffic (Permitted Parking Area and Special Parking Area) (County of Hertfordshire) (District of Three Rivers) Order 2001 SI 2001/1789

=== 1801–1900 ===
- The Import and Export Restrictions (Foot-And-Mouth Disease) (Wales) (No. 6) Regulations 2001 SI 2001/1801
- The Foot-and-Mouth Disease (Marking of Meat, Meat Products, Minced Meat and Meat Preparations) (Wales) Regulations 2001 SI 2001/1802
- The Highways Noise Payments and Movable Homes (England) (Amendment) Regulations 2001 SI 2001/1803
- The Wildlife and Countryside (Isles of Scilly) Order 2001 SI 2001/1805
- The Passenger and Goods Vehicles (Recording Equipment) (Approval of Fitters and Workshops) (Fees) (Amendment) Regulations 2001 SI 2001/1810
- The International Transport of Goods under Cover of TIR Carnets (Fees) (Amendment) Regulations 2001 SI 2001/1811
- The International Carriage of Dangerous Goods by Road (Fees) (Amendment) Regulations 2001 SI 2001/1812
- The Retained Organs Commission (Establishment and Constitution) Amendment Order 2001 SI 2001/1813
- The Road Traffic Offenders (Additional Offences and Prescribed Devices) Order 2001 SI 2001/1814
- The Drug Abstinence Order (Responsible Officer) Order 2001 SI 2001/1815
- The Criminal Justice (Specified Class A Drugs) Order 2001 SI 2001/1816
- The Social Security Contributions (Share Options) Regulations 2001 SI 2001/1817
- The Social Security Contributions (Deferred Payments and Interest) Regulations 2001 SI 2001/1818
- The Financial Services and Markets Act 2000 (Regulations Relating to Money Laundering) Regulations 2001 SI 2001/1819
- The Financial Services and Markets Act 2000 (Commencement 3) Order 2001 SI 2001/1820
- The Financial Services and Markets Act 2000 (Consequential and Transitional Provisions) (Miscellaneous) Order 2001 SI 2001/1821
- The Community Drivers' Hours (Foot-and-Mouth Disease) (Temporary Exception) (No. 2) (Amendment) Regulations 2001 SI 2001/1822
- The Local Authorities (Goods and Services) (Public Bodies) (England) (No. 3) Order 2001 SI 2001/1823
- The Road Vehicles (Construction and Use) (Amendment) (No. 3) Regulations 2001 SI 2001/1825
- The Building Societies (Restricted Transactions) Order 2001 SI 2001/1826
- Child Minding and Day Care (Disqualification) (England) Regulations 2001 SI 2001/1827
- The Day Care and Child Minding (National Standards) (England) Regulations 2001 SI 2001/1828
- Child Minding and Day Care (Applications for Registration) (England) Regulations 2001 SI 2001/1829
- Child Minding and Day Care (Certificates of Registration) (England) Regulations 2001 SI 2001/1830
- The Income Support (General) (Standard Interest Rate Amendment) Regulations 2001 SI 2001/1831
- The Medicines (Aristolochia and Mu Tong etc.) (Prohibition) Order 2001 SI 2001/1841
- The Sex Offenders (Notice Requirements) (Foreign Travel) Regulations 2001 SI 2001/1846
- The Sex Offenders Act 1997 (Northern Ireland) Order 2001 SI 2001/1853
- The Road Traffic (Permitted Parking Area and Special Parking Area) (County of Kent) (Borough of Dartford) Order 2001 SI 2001/1855
- The Road Traffic (Permitted Parking Area and Special Parking Area) (County of Northamptonshire) (Borough of Northampton) Order 2001 SI 2001/1856
- The Financial Services and Markets Act 2000 (Disclosure of Information by Prescribed Persons) Regulations 2001 SI 2001/1857
- The Financial Services and Markets Act 2000 (Competition Information) (Specification of Enactment etc.) Order 2001 SI 2001/1858
- The Residential Accommodation (Relevant Premises, Ordinary Residence and Exemptions) (Amendment) (England) Regulations 2001 SI 2001/1859
- The Foot-and-Mouth Disease (Amendment) (England) (No. 7) Order 2001 SI 2001/1862
- The Housing Benefit and Council Tax Benefit (General) Amendment Regulations 2001 SI 2001/1864
- The Employment Zones (Amendment) (No.2) Regulations 2001 SI 2001/1865
- The Financial Investigations (Northern Ireland) Order 2001 SI 2001/1866
- The Liberia (United Nations Sanctions) (Overseas Territories) (No. 2) Order 2001 SI 2001/1867
- The Advisory Centre on WTO Law (Immunities and Privileges) Order 2001 SI 2001/1868
- The Local Authorities (Armorial Bearings) (Wales) Order 2001 SI 2001/1869
- The Foot-and-Mouth Disease (Amendment) (Wales) (No.7) Order 2001 SI 2001/1874
- The Representation of the People (Northern Ireland) (Amendment) Regulations 2001 SI 2001/1877
- The Import and Export Restrictions (Foot-And-Mouth Disease) (No. 6) (Wales) (Amendment) Regulations 2001 SI 2001/1884
- Child Minding and Day Care (Registration and Annual Fees) Regulations 2001 SI 2001/1886
- The Central Manchester and Manchester Children's University Hospitals National Health Service Trust (Establishment) Order 2001 SI 2001/1887
- The Mersey Care National Health Service Trust (Establishment) Order 2001 SI 2001/1888
- The North Sefton & West Lancashire Community National Health Service Trust (Establishment) Amendment Order 2001 SI 2001/1889
- The Central Manchester Healthcare and the Manchester Children's Hospitals National Health Service Trusts (Dissolution) Order 2001 SI 2001/1895
- The Road Traffic (Vehicle Testing) Act 1999 (Commencement 1) Order 2001 SI 2001/1896

=== 1901–2000 ===
- The Rotherham Priority Health Services National Health Service Trust (Establishment) Amendment Order 2001 SI 2001/1910
- The Offshore Installations (Safety Zones) Order 2001 SI 2001/1914
- The Winchester and Eastleigh Healthcare National Health Service Trust (Establishment) Amendment Order 2001 SI 2001/1915
- The Southampton Community Health Services National Health Service Trust (Establishment) Amendment Order 2001 SI 2001/1916
- The Import and Export Restrictions (Foot-And-Mouth Disease) (No. 7) (Amendment) Regulations 2001 SI 2001/1936
- The Daventry and South Northamptonshire Primary Care Trust (Establishment) Amendment Order 2001 SI 2001/1937
- The Uttlesford Primary Care Trust (Establishment) Amendment Order 2001 SI 2001/1938
- The Ealing, Hammersmith and Fulham Mental Health National Health Service Trust (Dissolution) Order 2001 SI 2001/1975
- The Import and Export Restrictions (Foot-and-Mouth Disease) (No. 7) (Amendment) (No. 2) Regulations 2001 SI 2001/1983
- The Foot-and-Mouth Disease (Export of Vehicles) (Disinfection of Tyres) (Amendment) (No. 4) Regulations 2001 SI 2001/1984
- The Health Act 1999 (Commencement 11) Order 2001 SI 2001/1985
- The Import and Export Restrictions (Foot-And-Mouth Disease) (Wales) (No. 7) Regulations 2001 SI 2001/1986
- The Education (Extension of Careers Education) (Wales) Regulations 2001 SI 2001/1987
- The A45 (A508 Queen Eleanor Roundabout to the A14) (Trunking) Order 2001 SI 2001/1988
- The A508 (M1 Junction 15 To A45 Queen Eleanor Roundabout) (Trunking) Order 2001 SI 2001/1989

=== 2001–2100 ===
- The Crab Claws (Prohibition of Landing) (Revocation) (Wales) Order 2001 SI 2001/2018
- The Undersized Whiting (Revocation) (Wales) Order 2001 SI 2001/2019
- The Chiropractors Act 1994 (Commencement Order 5 and Transitional Provision) Order 2001 SI 2001/2028
- The Disability Discrimination Act 1995 (Commencement 9) Order 2001 SI 2001/2030
- The Care Standards Act 2000 (Commencement 7 (England) and Transitional, Transitory and Savings Provisions) Order 2001 SI 2001/2041
- The A417 Trunk Road (Cirencester Bypass–Hare Bushes Service Area) (Detrunking) Order 2001 SI 2001/2053
- The Medicines (Products Other Than Veterinary Drugs) (General Sale List) Amendment Order 2001 SI 2001/2068
- The Education (Publication of Draft Proposals and Orders) (Further Education Corporations) (Wales) Regulations 2001 SI 2001/2069
- The Housing Grants (Additional Purposes) (Wales) Order 2001 SI 2001/2070
- The Housing Renewal Grants (Prescribed Forms and Particulars) (Amendment) (Wales) Regulations 2001 SI 2001/2071
- The Relocation Grants (Forms of Application) (Amendment) (Wales) Regulations 2001 SI 2001/2072
- The Housing Renewal Grants (Amendment) (Wales) Regulations 2001 SI 2001/2073
- The School Standards and Framework Act 1998 (Amendment of Schedule 18) (England) Order 2001 SI 2001/2086

=== 2101–2200 ===
- The A6 Trunk Road (Bedford to Luton) (Detrunking) Order 2001 SI 2001/2101
- The A6 Trunk Road (South of Kettering to the A45) (Detrunking) Order 2001 SI 2001/2102
- The Education (Inspectors of Schools in England) (No.2) Order 2001 SI 2001/2124
- The Designs (Convention Countries) (Amendment) Order 2001 SI 2001/2125
- The Patents (Convention Countries) (Amendment) Order 2001 SI 2001/2126
- The Health and Safety at Work etc. Act 1974 (Application outside Great Britain) Order 2001 SI 2001/2127
- The Air Navigation (Overseas Territories) Order 2001 SI 2001/2128
- The A43 Trunk Road (M1 Junction 15A to A16 Stamford) (Detrunking) Order 2001 SI 2001/2130
- The A428 Trunk Road (Northampton To East Of Bedford) (Detrunking) Order 2001 SI 2001/2131
- The A421 (M1 Junction 13 Roundabout, Husborne Crawley, Bedfordshire) (Trunking) Order 2001 SI 2001/2132
- The National Health Service (General Dental Services) (Amendment) (Wales) Regulations 2001 SI 2001/2133
- The Care Council for Wales (Appointment, Membership and Procedure) Regulations 2001 SI 2001/2136
- The A15 Norman Cross to Grimsby Trunk Road (Tillbridge Lane Junction Improvement) Order 2001 SI 2001/2143
- The International Criminal Court Act 2001 (Commencement) Order 2001 SI 2001/2161
- The Cowes Harbour (Constitution) Revision Order 2001 SI 2001/2183
- The Fowey Harbour Revision Order 2001 SI 2001/2184
- The Yarmouth (Isle of Wight) Harbour Revision (Constitution) Order 2001 SI 2001/2185
- The Carers (Services) and Direct Payments (Amendment) (Wales) Regulations 2001 SI 2001/2186
- The Social Security (Contributions) (Amendment 4) Regulations 2001 SI 2001/2187
- The Financial Services and Markets Act 2000 (Disclosure of Confidential Information) Regulations 2001 SI 2001/2188
- The Children (Leaving Care) (Wales) Regulations 2001 SI 2001/2189
- The Care Standards Act 2000 (Commencement3) (Wales) Order 2001 SI 2001/2190
- The Children (Leaving Care) Act 2000 (Commencement) (Wales) Order 2001 SI 2001/2191
- The Disabled Children (Direct Payments) (Wales) Regulations 2001 SI 2001/2192
- The Common Agricultural Policy (Wine) (Wales) Regulations 2001 SI 2001/2193
- The Import and Export Restrictions (Foot-And-Mouth Disease) (No. 8) Regulations 2001 SI 2001/2194
- The Foot-and-Mouth Disease (Export of Vehicles) (Disinfection of Tyres) (Amendment) (No. 5) Regulations 2001 SI 2001/2195
- The Carers and Disabled Children Act 2000 (Commencement 1) (Wales) Order 2001 SI 2001/2196
- The Contaminated Land (Wales) Regulations 2001 SI 2001/2197
- The Meat (Enhanced Enforcement Powers) (Wales) Regulations 2001 SI 2001/2198

=== 2201–2300 ===
- The Local Authorities (Functions and Responsibilities) (England) (Amendment) Regulations 2001 SI 2001/2212
- The A249 Trunk Road (Neatscourt Roundabout to Queenborough Improvement) Order 2001 SI 2001/2213
- The Education (Special Educational Needs) (England) Regulations 2001 SI 2001/2216
- The Special Educational Needs And Disability Act 2001 (Commencement 1) Order 2001 SI 2001/2217
- The Special Educational Needs (Provision of Information by Local Education Authorities) (England) Regulations 2001 SI 2001/2218
- The Gelatine (Intra-Community Trade) (Wales) Regulations 2001 SI 2001/2219
- The Tax Credits (Miscellaneous Amendments 6) Regulations 2001 SI 2001/2220
- The Tax Credits (Miscellaneous Amendments 6) (Northern Ireland) Regulations 2001 SI 2001/2221
- The Central Rating List (Wales) (Amendment) Regulations 2001 SI 2001/2222
- The Criminal Justice and Police Act 2001 (Commencement 1) Order 2001 SI 2001/2223
- The Criminal Justice and Court Services Act 2000 (Commencement 7) Order 2001 SI 2001/2232
- The Community Order (Electronic Monitoring of Requirements) (Responsible Officer) Order 2001 SI 2001/2233
- The Curfew Order and Curfew Requirement (Responsible Officer) Order 2001 SI 2001/2234
- The Import and Export Restrictions (Foot-And-Mouth Disease) (Wales) (No. 8) Regulations 2001 SI 2001/2235
- The Foot-and-Mouth Disease (Amendment) (Wales) (No. 8) Order 2001 SI 2001/2236
- The Local Authorities (Executive and Alternative Arrangements) (Modification of Enactments and Other Provisions) (England) Order 2001 SI 2001/2237
- The Foot-and-Mouth Disease (Amendment) (England) (No. 8) Order 2001 SI 2001/2238
- The Feeding Stuffs (Sampling and Analysis) (Amendment) (Wales) Regulations 2001 SI 2001/2253
- The Police and Criminal Evidence Act 1984 (Codes of Practice) (Modification) Order 2001 SI 2001/2254
- The Financial Services and Markets Act 2000 (Transitional Provisions) (Designated Date for The Securities and Futures Authority) Order 2001 SI 2001/2255
- The Financial Services and Markets Act 2000 (Rights of Action) Regulations 2001 SI 2001/2256
- The Parental Responsibility Agreement (Amendment) Regulations 2001 SI 2001/2262
- The Education (School Government) (Wales) (Amendment) Regulations 2001 SI 2001/2263
- The Railway Pensions (Designation, Substitution and Miscellaneous Provisions) Order 2001 SI 2001/2264
- The Wireless Telegraphy (Licence Charges) (Amendment) Regulations 2001 SI 2001/2265
- The Motor Vehicles (Third Party Risks) (Amendment) Regulations 2001 SI 2001/2266
- The Stamp Duty Reserve Tax (Tradepoint) (Amendment) Regulations 2001 SI 2001/2267
- The Education (Designated Institutions) (No. 2) Order 2001 SI 2001/2268
- The Justices' Clerks (Qualifications of Assistants) (Amendment) Rules 2001 SI 2001/2269
- The Road Traffic (Permitted Parking Area and Special Parking Area) (City of Brighton & Hove) Order 2001 SI 2001/2272
- The Commission for Local Administration in Wales and Local Commissioner in Wales (Functions and Expenses) Regulations 2001 SI 2001/2275
- The Conduct of Members (Principles) (Wales) Order 2001 SI 2001/2276
- The Local Authorities (Proposals for Executive Arrangements) (Wales) Order 2001 SI 2001/2277
- The Code of Conduct (Non-Qualifying Local Government Employees) (Wales) Regulations 2001 SI 2001/2278
- The Standards Committees (Grant of Dispensations) (Wales) Regulations 2001 SI 2001/2279
- The Code of Conduct (Qualifying Local Government Employees) (Wales) Order 2001 SI 2001/2280
- Local Government Investigations (Functions of Monitoring Officers and Standards Committees)(Wales) Regulations 2001 SI 2001/2281
- The Standards Committees (Wales) Regulations 2001 SI 2001/2283
- The Local Authorities (Alternative Arrangements) (Wales) Regulations 2001 SI 2001/2284
- The Road User Charging (Charges and Penalty Charges) (London) Regulations 2001 SI 2001/2285
- The Local Commissioner in Wales (Standards Investigations) Order 2001 SI 2001/2286
- The Local Authorities (Executive Arrangements) (Discharge of Functions) (Wales) Regulations 2001 SI 2001/2287
- The Adjudications by Case Tribunals and Interim Case Tribunals (Wales) Regulations 2001 SI 2001/2288
- The Conduct of Members (Model Code of Conduct) (Wales) Order 2001 SI 2001/2289
- Local Authorities (Executive Arrangements) (Decisions, Documents and Meetings) (Wales) Regulations 2001 SI 2001/2290
- The Local Authorities Executive Arrangements (Functions and Responsibilities) (Wales) Regulations 2001 SI 2001/2291
- The Local Authorities (Referendums) (Petitions and Directions) (Wales) Regulations 2001 SI 2001/2292
- Local Authorities (Proposals for Alternative Arrangements) (Wales) Regulations 2001 SI 2001/2293
- The Sweeteners in Food (Amendment) (England) Regulations 2001 SI 2001/2294
- The Social Security Amendment (Volunteers) Regulations 2001 SI 2001/2296
- The Education (Grants for Disabled Postgraduate Students) (Amendment) Regulations 2001 SI 2001/2300

=== 2301–2400 ===
- The Damages (Personal Injury) Order 2001 SI 2001/2301
- The Prescribed Waste (Wales) (Revocation) Regulations 2001 SI 2001/2302
- The Trunk Road Charging Schemes (Bridges and Tunnels) (England) Procedure Regulations 2001 SI 2001/2303
- The International Criminal Court Act 2001 (Commencement) (Amendment) Order 2001 SI 2001/2304
- The Value Added Tax (Conversion of Buildings) Order 2001 SI 2001/2305
- The Road User Charging (Enforcement and Adjudication) (London) Regulations 2001 SI 2001/2313
- The Air Quality Limit Values Regulations 2001 SI 2001/2315
- The Social Security Act 1998 (Commencement 13) Order 2001 SI 2001/2316
- The Rent Officers (Housing Benefit Functions) (Amendment) (No.2) Order 2001 SI 2001/2317
- The Rent Officers (Housing Benefit Functions) (Scotland) (Amendment) (No. 2) Order 2001 SI 2001/2318
- The Social Security Amendment (Students and Income-related Benefits) Regulations 2001 SI 2001/2319
- The Financial Services and Markets Act 2000 (Transitional Provisions) (Ombudsman Scheme and Complaints Scheme) Order 2001 SI 2001/2326
- The Social Security Amendment (Discretionary Housing Payments) Regulations 2001 SI 2001/2333
- The Discretionary Housing Payments (Grants) Order 2001 SI 2001/2340
- The Plant Health (England) (Amendment) Order 2001 SI 2001/2342
- The Merchant Shipping (Port State Control) (Amendment) Regulations 2001 SI 2001/2349
- The Income-related Benefits (Subsidy to Authorities) Amendment Order 2001 SI 2001/2350
- The Environment Act 1995 (Commencement and Saving Provision) (Wales) Order 2001 SI 2001/2351
- The Care Standards Act 2000 (Commencement 4) (Wales) Order 2001 SI 2001/2354
- The Education (Student Support) (Amendment) (No. 2) Regulations 2001 SI 2001/2355
- The Potatoes Originating in Egypt (Amendment) (Wales) Regulations 2001 SI 2001/2356
- Valuation for Rating (Plant and Machinery) (Wales) (Amendment) Regulations 2001 SI 2001/2357
- The Community Drivers' Hours (Foot-and-Mouth Disease) (Temporary Exception) (No. 2) (Amendment 2) Regulations 2001 SI 2001/2358
- The National Health Service (Charges for Drugs and Appliances) (Amendment) (Wales) Regulations 2001 SI 2001/2359
- The BSE Monitoring (Wales) Regulations 2001 SI 2001/2360
- The Financial Services and Markets Act 2000 (Meaning of Policy and Policyholder) Order 2001 SI 2001/2361
- The Financial Services and Markets Act 2000 (Commencement 4 and Transitional Provision) Order 2001 SI 2001/2364
- The Safety of Sports Grounds (Designation) Order 2001 SI 2001/2372
- The Football Spectators (Seating) Order 2001 SI 2001/2373
- The Foot-and-Mouth Disease (Prohibition of Vaccination) (Wales) Regulations 2001 SI 2001/2374
- The Foot-and-Mouth Disease (Control of Vaccination) (England) Regulations 2001 SI 2001/2375
- The Processed Animal Protein (England) Regulations 2001 SI 2001/2376
- The Immigration (Designation of Travel Bans) (Amendment) Order 2001 SI 2001/2377
- The Broadcasting (Subtitling) Order 2001 SI 2001/2378
- The International Criminal Court Act 2001 (Enforcement of Fines, Forfeiture and Reparation Orders) Regulations 2001 SI 2001/2379
- The Financial Services and Markets Act 2000 (Collective Investment Schemes Constituted in Other EEA States) Regulations 2001 SI 2001/2383
- The Housing Renewal Grants (Amendment 2) (England) Regulations 2001 SI 2001/2384
- The Relocation Grants (Form of Application) (Amendment 2) (England) Regulations 2001 SI 2001/2385
- The Housing Renewal Grants (Prescribed Form and Particulars) (Amendment 2) (England) Regulations 2001 SI 2001/2386

=== 2401–2500 ===
- The Protection of Wrecks (Designation) Order 2001 SI 2001/2403
- The North Middlesex Hospital National Health Service Trust (Change of Name) Order 2001 SI 2001/2407
- The Social Security (Contributions) (Amendment 5) Regulations 2001 SI 2001/2412
- The A5 London to Holyhead Trunk Road (Nutts Lane Junction Improvement) Order 2001 SI 2001/2416
- The Legal Aid in Family Proceedings (Remuneration) (Amendment 3) Regulations 2001 SI 2001/2417
- The Utilities Contracts (Amendment) Regulations 2001 SI 2001/2418
- The Plant Protection Products (Amendment) (No. 2) Regulations 2001 SI 2001/2419
- The Pesticides (Maximum Residue Levels in Crops, Food and Feeding Stuffs) (England and Wales) (Amendment) (No. 2) Regulations 2001 SI 2001/2420
- The National Health Service (General Dental Services) Amendment (No. 5) Regulations 2001 SI 2001/2421
- The Partnerships (Unrestricted Size) 17 Regulations 2001 SI 2001/2422
- The NCS Service Authority (Budget Statement) Order 2001 SI 2001/2427
- The NCIS Service Authority (Budget Statement) Order 2001 SI 2001/2428
- The Borough of Ribble Valley (Electoral Changes) Order 2001 SI 2001/2429
- The Borough of Rossendale (Electoral Changes) Order 2001 SI 2001/2430
- The Borough of South Ribble (Electoral Changes) Order 2001 SI 2001/2431
- The District of West Lancashire (Electoral Changes) Order 2001 SI 2001/2432
- The Borough of Wyre (Electoral Changes) Order 2001 SI 2001/2433
- The District of Uttlesford (Electoral Changes) Order 2001 SI 2001/2434
- The District of Tendring (Electoral Changes) Order 2001 SI 2001/2435
- The District of Maldon (Electoral Changes) Order 2001 SI 2001/2436
- The District of Harlow (Electoral Changes) Order 2001 SI 2001/2437
- The Borough of Colchester (Electoral Changes) Order 2001 SI 2001/2438
- The Borough of Chelmsford (Electoral Changes) Order 2001 SI 2001/2439
- The Borough of Castle Point (Electoral Changes) Order 2001 SI 2001/2440
- The Borough of Brentwood (Electoral Changes) Order 2001 SI 2001/2441
- The District of Braintree (Electoral Changes) Order 2001 SI 2001/2442
- The District of Basildon (Electoral Changes) Order 2001 SI 2001/2443
- The District of Epping Forest (Electoral Changes) Order 2001 SI 2001/2444
- The Agricultural Processing and Marketing Grant (Wales) Regulations 2001 SI 2001/2446
- The Thurrock College and Basildon College (Dissolution) Order 2001 SI 2001/2447
- The Civil Aviation Authority (Amendment) Regulations 2001 SI 2001/2448
- The Cider and Perry (Amendment) Regulations 2001 SI 2001/2449
- The Education (Special Educational Needs) (England) (Amendment) Regulations 2001 SI 2001/2468
- The Borough of Hyndburn (Electoral Changes) Order 2001 SI 2001/2469
- The City of Lancaster (Electoral Changes) Order 2001 SI 2001/2470
- The Borough of Pendle (Electoral Changes) Order 2001 SI 2001/2471
- The Borough of Preston (Electoral Changes) Order 2001 SI 2001/2472
- The Borough of Burnley (Electoral Changes) Order 2001 SI 2001/2473
- The Borough of Chorley (Electoral Changes) Order 2001 SI 2001/2474
- The Borough of Fylde (Electoral Changes) Order 2001 SI 2001/2475
- The Financial Services and Markets Tribunal Rules 2001 SI 2001/2476
- The Plant Protection Products (Fees) Regulations 2001 SI 2001/2477
- The Scotland Act 1998 (Regulation of Care (Scotland) Act 2001) Order 2001 SI 2001/2478
- The Auditor General for Wales (Transfer of Functions) (General Teaching Council for Wales) Order 2001 SI 2001/2479
- The Police and Criminal Evidence Act 1984 (Tape-recording of Interviews) (Amendment) Order 2001 SI 2001/2480
- The Motor Vehicles (Approval) (Fees) Regulations 2001 SI 2001/2486
- The Telecommunications (Licence Modifications) (Amendment) Regulations 2001 SI 2001/2495
- The General Teaching Council for Wales (Functions) (Amendment) Regulations 2001 SI 2001/2496
- The General Teaching Council for Wales (Additional Functions) (Amendment) Order 2001 SI 2001/2497
- The Police Act 1997 (Criminal Records) (Registration) (Amendment) Regulations 2001 SI 2001/2498
- The Education (School Day and School Year) (Amendment) (Wales) Regulations 2001 SI 2001/2499
- The Plant Health (Amendment) (Wales) Order 2001 SI 2001/2500

=== 2501–2600 ===
- The Inspection of Education and Training (Wales) Regulations 2001 SI 2001/2501
- The Import and Export Restrictions (Foot-and-Mouth Disease) (No. 9) Regulations 2001 SI 2001/2502
- The Beef Special Premium Regulations 2001 SI 2001/2503
- The Care Standards Act 2000 (Commencement5 and Transitional Provisions) (Wales) Order 2001 SI 2001/2504
- The International Criminal Court Act 2001 (Elements of Crimes) Regulations 2001 SI 2001/2505
- The National Lottery (Licence Fees) Order 2001 SI 2001/2506
- The Financial Services and Markets Act 2000 (Variation of Threshold Conditions) Order 2001 SI 2001/2507
- The Financial Services and Markets Act 2000 (Appointed Representatives) (Amendment) Regulations 2001 SI 2001/2508
- The Financial Services and Markets Act 2000 (Consultation with Competent Authorities) Regulations 2001 SI 2001/2509
- The Financial Services and Markets Act 2000 (Gaming Contracts) Order 2001 SI 2001/2510
- The Financial Services and Markets Act 2000 (EEA Passport Rights) Regulations 2001 SI 2001/2511
- The Financial Services and Markets Act 2000 (Transitional Provisions) (Reviews of Pensions Business) Order 2001 SI 2001/2512
- The Police (Northern Ireland) Order 2001 SI 2001/2513
- The Employment Zones (Amendment) (No. 3) Regulations 2001 SI 2001/2521
- The Offshore Installations (Safety Zones) (No. 2) Order 2001 SI 2001/2528
- The Import and Export Restrictions (Foot-And-Mouth Disease) (Wales) (No. 9) Regulations 2001 SI 2001/2529
- The Commission Areas (Sussex) Order 2001 SI 2001/2530
- The Seeds (Fees) (Amendment) (Wales) Regulations 2001 SI 2001/2533
- The Teacher Training Incentive (Further Education) (Wales) Regulations 2001 SI 2001/2536
- The Agricultural Subsidies (Appeals) (Wales) Regulations 2001 SI 2001/2537
- The Care Standards Act 2000 (Commencement6) (Wales) Order 2001 SI 2001/2538
- The Tax Credits (Miscellaneous Amendments 7) Regulations 2001 SI 2001/2539
- The Tax Credits (Miscellaneous Amendments 7) (Northern Ireland) Regulations 2001 SI 2001/2540
- The Capital Allowances (Energy-saving Plant and Machinery) Order 2001 SI 2001/2541
- The B1525 (Formerly A16) Trunk Road (Market Deeping/Deeping St. James) (Detrunking) Order 2001 SI 2001/2543
- The Local Authorities (Elected Mayors) (Elections, Terms of Office and Casual Vacancies) (England) Regulations 2001 SI 2001/2544
- The Welsh Language Schemes (Public Bodies) Order 2001 SI 2001/2550
- The Batteries and Accumulators (Containing Dangerous Substances) (Amendment) Regulations 2001 SI 2001/2551
- The Stockport (Parish) Order 2001 SI 2001/2553
- The European Communities (Designation) (No. 2) Order 2001 SI 2001/2555
- The Education (Chief Inspector of Schools in England) Order 2001 SI 2001/2556
- The Afghanistan (United Nations Sanctions) (Amendment) Order 2001 SI 2001/2557
- The Afghanistan (United Nations Sanctions) (Overseas Territories) (Amendment) Order 2001 SI 2001/2558
- The International Criminal Court Act 2001 (Reservations and Declarations) Order 2001 SI 2001/2559
- The Specialized Agencies of the United Nations (Immunities and Privileges of UNESCO) Order 2001 SI 2001/2560
- The Central Council for Education and Training in Social Work (Transfer Scheme) Order 2001 SI 2001/2561
- The Afghanistan (United Nations Sanctions) (Channel Islands) (Amendment) Order 2001 SI 2001/2562
- The United Nations (International Tribunal) (Former Yugoslavia) (Amendment) Order 2001 SI 2001/2563
- The Life Sentences (Northern Ireland) Order 2001 SI 2001/2564
- The Life Sentences (Northern Ireland Consequential Amendments) Order 2001 SI 2001/2565
- The Afghanistan (United Nations Sanctions) (Isle of Man) (Amendment) Order 2001 SI 2001/2566
- The Reciprocal Enforcement of Maintenance Orders (Hague Convention Countries) (Variation) Order 2001 SI 2001/2567
- The Secretaries of State for Transport, Local Government and the Regions and for Environment, Food and Rural Affairs Order 2001 SI 2001/2568
- The Kent (Coroners' Districts) Order 2001 SI 2001/2570
- The Bermuda Constitution (Amendment) Order 2001 SI 2001/2579
- The Rating (Former Agricultural Premises and Rural Shops) Act 2001 (Commencement 1) Order 2001 SI 2001/2580
- The Foreign Package Holidays (Tour Operators and Travel Agents) Order 2001 SI 2001/2581
- The Public Telecommunication System Designation (FirstMark Carrier Services (UK) Limited) Order 2001 SI 2001/2582
- The Public Telecommunication System Designation (Nextlink UK Limited) Order 2001 SI 2001/2583
- The Public Telecommunication System Designation (GTS Network (Ireland) Ltd) Order 2001 SI 2001/2584
- The Non-Domestic Rating (Former Agricultural Premises) (England) Order 2001 SI 2001/2585
- The Non-Domestic Rating (Stud Farms) (England) Order 2001 SI 2001/2586
- The Financial Services and Markets Act 2000 (Communications by Auditors) Regulations 2001 SI 2001/2587
- The Immigration (Leave to Enter) Order 2001 SI 2001/2590
- The Seeds (Fees) (Amendment) (England) Regulations 2001 SI 2001/2598
- The Northern Ireland Assembly (Elections) Order 2001 SI 2001/2599
- The Magistrates' Courts (International Criminal Court) (Forms) Rules 2001 SI 2001/2600

=== 2601–2700 ===
- The Foot-and-Mouth Disease (Marking of Meat, Meat Products, Minced Meat and Meat Preparations) (No. 2) Regulations 2001 SI 2001/2601
- The Public Telecommunication System Designation (Isle of Wight Cable & Telephone Company Limited) Order 2001 SI 2001/2602
- The Public Telecommunication System Designation (Fibreway Limited) Order 2001 SI 2001/2603
- The Public Telecommunication System Designation (ntl Group Ltd) Order 2001 SI 2001/2604
- The Public Telecommunication System Designation (Energis Local Access Limited) Order 2001 SI 2001/2605
- The Telecommunication Meters (Approval Fees) (BABT) (Amendment) Order 2001 SI 2001/2606
- The Public Telecommunication System Designation (Williams Communications UK Limited) Order 2001 SI 2001/2607
- The Public Telecommunication System Designation (Carrier 1 UK Limited) Order 2001 SI 2001/2608
- The Public Telecommunication System Designation (Broadnet UK Limited) Order 2001 SI 2001/2609
- The Public Telecommunication System Designation (Universal Access UK Limited) Order 2001 SI 2001/2610
- The Public Telecommunication System Designation (Verizon Global Solutions U.K. Limited) Order 2001 SI 2001/2611
- The Education (Special Educational Needs) (England) (Amendment 2) Regulations 2001 SI 2001/2612
- The Education (Mandatory Awards) (Amendment) Regulations 2001 SI 2001/2613
- The Special Educational Needs and Disability Act 2001 (Commencement 1) (Amendment) Order 2001 SI 2001/2614
- The National Savings Stock Register (Amendment) Regulations 2001 SI 2001/2616
- The Financial Services and Markets Act 2000 (Mutual Societies) Order 2001 SI 2001/2617
- The Welfare Reform and Pensions (Persons Abroad: Benefits for Widows and Widowers) (Consequential Amendments) Regulations 2001 SI 2001/2618
- The Child Support, Pensions and Social Security Act 2000 (Commencement 10) Order 2001 SI 2001/2619
- The Greater London Authority (Miscellaneous Amendments) Order 2001 SI 2001/2620
- The Education (Teacher Training Hardship Grants) (England) (No. 2) Regulations 2001 SI 2001/2621
- Education (Teacher Training Bursaries) (England) Regulations 2001 SI 2001/2622
- The Import and Export Restrictions (Foot-and-Mouth Disease) (No. 9) (Amendment) Regulations 2001 SI 2001/2623
- The District of Rochford (Electoral Changes) Order 2001 SI 2001/2624
- The County Council of Hampshire (Norris Bridge Gyratory—Norris Bridge, Pyestock) Scheme 2000 Confirmation Instrument 2001 SI 2001/2625
- The Health and Safety (Fees) Regulations 2001 SI 2001/2626
- The Foot-and-Mouth Disease (Marking of Meat, Meat Products, Minced Meat and Meat Preparations) (Wales) (No. 2) Regulations 2001 SI 2001/2627
- The Import and Export Restrictions (Foot-and-Mouth Disease) (Wales) (No.9) (Amendment) Regulations 2001 SI 2001/2628
- The National Health Service Trusts (Membership and Procedure) Amendment (England) Regulations 2001 SI 2001/2629
- The Health Authorities (Membership and Procedure) Amendment (England) (No. 2) Regulations 2001 SI 2001/2630
- The Primary Care Trusts (Membership, Procedure and Administration Arrangements) Amendment (England) Regulations 2001 SI 2001/2631
- The Financial Services and Markets Act 2000 (Commencement 5) Order 2001 SI 2001/2632
- The Financial Services and Markets Act 2000 (Financial Promotion) (Amendment) Order 2001 SI 2001/2633
- The Financial Services and Markets Act 2000 (Insolvency) (Definition of Insurer) Order 2001 SI 2001/2634
- The Financial Services and Markets Act 2000 (Law Applicable to Contracts of Insurance) Regulations 2001 SI 2001/2635
- The Financial Services and Markets Act 2000 (Transitional Provisions) (Authorised Persons etc.) Order 2001 SI 2001/2636
- The Financial Services and Markets Act 2000 (Transitional Provisions) (Controllers) Order 2001 SI 2001/2637
- The Financial Services and Markets Act 2000 (Controllers) (Exemption) Order 2001 SI 2001/2638
- The Financial Services and Markets Act 2000 (Own-initiative Power) (Overseas Regulators) Regulations 2001 SI 2001/2639
- The Foot-and-Mouth Disease (Export of Vehicles) (Disinfection of Tyres) (Amendment) (No. 6) Regulations 2001 SI 2001/2640
- The Merchant Shipping (Life-Saving Appliances) (Amendment) Regulations 2001 SI 2001/2642
- The Police and Criminal Evidence Act 1984 (Drug Testing of Persons in Police Detention) (Prescribed Persons) Regulations 2001 SI 2001/2645
- The Football (Disorder) (Duration of Powers) Order 2001 SI 2001/2646
- The Asian Development Bank (Seventh Replenishment of the Asian Development Fund) Order 2001 SI 2001/2648
- The Parliamentary Pensions (Amendment) (Pension Sharing) Regulations 2001 SI 2001/2649
- The Specified Risk Material (Amendment) (England) Order 2001 SI 2001/2650
- The Financial Services and Markets Act 2000 (Transitional Provisions and Savings) (Civil Remedies, Discipline, Criminal Offences etc.) Order 2001 SI 2001/2657
- The Financial Services and Markets Act 2000 (Consequential and Transitional Provisions) (Miscellaneous) (No. 2) Order 2001 SI 2001/2659
- The Sex Discrimination (Indirect Discrimination and Burden of Proof) Regulations 2001 SI 2001/2660
- The A564 Trunk Road (Stoke-Derby Route) (Derby Southern Bypass, Derby Spur and Junctions) (Amendment) (England) Order 2001 SI 2001/2661
- The Transport of Animals (Cleansing and Disinfection) (Wales) Order 2001 SI 2001/2662
- The School Standards and Framework Act 1998 (Commencement 9 and Supplemental Provisions) Order 2001 SI 2001/2663
- The Sub-Post Office Start-Up Capital Subsidy Scheme Order 2001 SI 2001/2664
- The Legal Officers (Annual Fees) Order 2001 SI 2001/2665
- The Parochial Fees Order 2001 SI 2001/2666
- The Ecclesiastical Judges, Legal Officers and Others (Fees) Order 2001 SI 2001/2671
- The Specified Risk Material (Amendment) (England) (No. 2) Regulations 2001 SI 2001/2672
- The King's Lynn Conservancy Board (Constitution) Harbour Revision Order 2001 SI 2001/2675
- The Income Support (General) (Standard Interest Rate Amendment) (No. 2) Regulations 2001 SI 2001/2676
- The Change of Category of Maintained Schools (Wales) Regulations 2001 SI 2001/2678
- The Sweeteners in Food (Amendment) (Wales) Regulations 2001 SI 2001/2679
- The Education (Assisted Places) (Amendment) (Wales) Regulations 2001 SI 2001/2680
- The Street Works (Inspection Fees) (Amendment) (Wales) Regulations 2001 SI 2001/2681
- The Welfare of Farmed Animals (Wales) Regulations 2001 SI 2001/2682
- The Air Quality Limit Values (Wales) Regulations 2001 SI 2001/2683
- The Local Government Act 2000 (Commencement 7) Order 2001 SI 2001/2684
- The High Court and County Courts Jurisdiction (Amendment 2) Order 2001 SI 2001/2685
- The Home-Grown Cereals Authority Levy (Variation) Scheme (Approval) Order 2001 SI 2001/2687
- The A428 Trunk Road (Cambourne Development Trunk Road and Slip Roads) Order 2001 SI 2001/2688
- The A428 Trunk Road (Cambourne Development Detrunking) Order 2001 SI 2001/2689

=== 2701–2800 ===
- The Learning and Skills Act 2000 (Commencement 4) (Wales) Order 2001 SI 2001/2705
- The National Health Service (General Dental Services) (Amendment) (No.2) (Wales) Regulations 2001 SI 2001/2706
- The Education (Assisted Places) (Incidental Expenses) (Amendment) (Wales) Regulations 2001 SI 2001/2708
- The Education (Foundation Body) (Wales) Regulations 2001 SI 2001/2709
- The Social Security (Literacy etc. Skills Training Pilot) Regulations 2001 SI 2001/2710
- The Magistrates' Courts Committees (Constitution) (Amendment) Regulations 2001 SI 2001/2711
- The Greater London Magistrates' Courts Authority (Constitution) (Amendment) Regulations 2001 SI 2001/2712
- The Civil Procedure (Modification of Enactments) Order 2001 SI 2001/2717
- The Town and Country Planning (General Permitted Development) (Amendment) (England) Order 2001 SI 2001/2718
- The Town and Country Planning (Fees for Applications and Deemed Applications) (Amendment) (England) Regulations 2001 SI 2001/2719
- The Representation of the People (Form of Canvass) (England and Wales) Regulations 2001 SI 2001/2720
- The Personal Portfolio Bonds (Tax) (Amendment) Regulations 2001 SI 2001/2724
- Representation of the People (Form of Canvass) (Northern Ireland) Regulations 2001 SI 2001/2725
- The Overseas Insurers (Tax Representatives) (Amendment) Regulations 2001 SI 2001/2726
- The Regulation of Investigatory Powers Act 2000 (Commencement 2) Order 2001 SI 2001/2727
- The Specified Risk Material (Amendment) (Wales) Regulations 2001 SI 2001/2732
- The Foot-and-Mouth Disease (Ascertainment of Value) (No. 5) Order 2001 SI 2001/2734
- The Foot-and-Mouth Disease (Amendment) (England) (No. 9) Order 2001 SI 2001/2735
- The Community Drivers' Hours (Foot-and-Mouth Disease) (Temporary Exception) (No. 2) (Amendment 3) Regulations 2001 SI 2001/2741
- Education (Grants) (Music, Ballet and Choir Schools) (England) Regulations 2001 SI 2001/2743
- The Education (Assisted Places) (Amendment) (England) Regulations 2001 SI 2001/2744
- The Day Care and Child Minding (Inspections) (Prescribed Matters) (England) Regulations 2001 SI 2001/2745
- The Day Care and Child Minding (Functions of Local Authorities: Information, Advice and Training) (England) Regulations 2001 SI 2001/2746
- The Teacher Training Agency (Additional Functions) (England) (No. 2) Order 2001 SI 2001/2747
- The Transport (Scotland) Act 2001 (Conditions attached to PSV Operator's Licence and Competition Test for Exercise of Bus Functions) Order 2001 SI 2001/2748
- The Education Maintenance Allowance (Pilot Areas) Regulations 2001 SI 2001/2750
- The Agricultural Holdings (Units of Production) (England) Order 2001 SI 2001/2751
- The National Minimum Wage Regulations 1999 (Amendment) (No. 2) Regulations 2001 SI 2001/2763
- The Foot-and-Mouth Disease (Ascertainment of Value) (Wales) (No. 5) Order 2001 SI 2001/2771
- The Prescription Only Medicines (Human Use) Amendment Order 2001 SI 2001/2777
- The Unsolicited Goods and Services Act 1971 (Electronic Communications) Order 2001 SI 2001/2778
- Motor Vehicles (Driving Licences) (Amendment) (No.4) Regulations 2001 SI 2001/2779
- The Processed Animal Protein (Wales) Regulations 2001 SI 2001/2780
- The Local Authorities (Members' Allowances) (Amendment) (Wales) Regulations 2001 SI 2001/2781
- The Care Standards Act 2000 (Commencement 7) (Wales) Order 2001 SI 2001/2782
- The Children's Commissioner for Wales Act 2001 (Commencement) Order 2001 SI 2001/2783
- The Children's Commissioner for Wales Regulations 2001 SI 2001/2787
- The Transport Act 2000 (Commencement1) (Wales) Order 2001 SI 2001/2788
- The A10 Trunk Road (Wadesmill, High Cross and Colliers End Bypass) Supplementary (No. 2) Slip Road Order 2001 SI 2001/2790
- The Civil Procedure (Amendment 4) Rules 2001 SI 2001/2792
- The Road User Charging And Workplace Parking Levy (Classes Of Motor Vehicles) (England) Regulations 2001 SI 2001/2793
- The Education (Assisted Places) (Incidental Expenses) (Amendment) (England) Regulations 2001 SI 2001/2794
- The Licensed Conveyancers' Discipline and Appeals Committee (Procedure) Rules Approval Order 2001 SI 2001/2797
- The Sussex Downs College (Incorporation) Order 2001 SI 2001/2798
- The Sussex Downs College (Government) Regulations 2001 SI 2001/2799
- The Education (Mandatory Awards) (Amendment) (No. 2) Regulations 2001 SI 2001/2800

=== 2801–2900 ===
- The Right to Time Off for Study or Training Regulations 2001 SI 2001/2801
- The Education (Pupil Registration) (Amendment) (England) Regulations 2001 SI 2001/2802
- The Health and Social Care Act 2001 (Commencement1) (England) Order 2001 SI 2001/2804
- The National Health Service (Dental Charges) Amendment (No. 2) Regulations 2001 SI 2001/2807
- The Motor Vehicles (EC Type Approval) (Amendment) Regulations 2001 SI 2001/2809
- The Relevant Authorities (Standards Committee) Regulations 2001 SI 2001/2812
- The Foot-and-Mouth Disease (Amendment) (Wales) (No. 9) Order 2001 SI 2001/2813
- The Foot-and-Mouth Disease (Amendment) (England) (No. 10) Order 2001 SI 2001/2814
- The Road Traffic (Permitted Parking Area and Special Parking Area) (County of Cumbria) (Borough of Barrow-in-Furness) Order 2001 SI 2001/2818
- The Road Traffic (Permitted Parking Area and Special Parking Area) (Borough of Bournemouth) Order 2001 SI 2001/2819
- The Poole Harbour Revision Order 2001 SI 2001/2820
- The Local Authorities (Alcohol Consumption in Designated Public Places) Regulations 2001 SI 2001/2831
- Patient Information Advisory Group (Establishment) Regulations 2001 SI 2001/2836
- Education (School Teacher Appraisal) (England) Regulations 2001 SI 2001/2855
- Breaking the Cycle Bridgwater Education Action Zone (Variation) Order 2001 SI 2001/2856
- The Education (Grants etc.) (Dance and Drama) (England) Regulations 2001 SI 2001/2857
- The North Somerset Education Action Zone (Extension) Order 2001 SI 2001/2858
- The Education (Grants) (Royal Ballet School) Regulations 2001 SI 2001/2859
- The Hackney Education Action Zone (Variation) Order 2001 SI 2001/2860
- The Education (Grants) (Yehudi Menuhin School) Regulations 2001 SI 2001/2861
- The Blackburn with Darwen Education Action Zone (Extension and Variation) Order 2001 SI 2001/2862
- The Next Step North East Lincolnshire Education Action Zone (Extension and Variation) Order 2001 SI 2001/2863
- The Salford and Trafford Education Action Zone (Extension and Variation) Order 2001 SI 2001/2864
- The East Middlesbrough Education Action Zone (Extension and Variation) Order 2001 SI 2001/2865
- The Local Government Pension Scheme (Her Majesty's Chief Inspector of Schools in England) (Transfers) Regulations 2001 SI 2001/2866
- The Herefordshire Education Action Zone (Extension and Variation) Order 2001 SI 2001/2867
- The New Addington Education Action Zone (Extension and Variation) Order 2001 SI 2001/2868
- The Leicester (South and West) Education Action Zone (Extension and Variation) Order 2001 SI 2001/2869
- The Railtrack (Shortlands Junction) Order 2001 SI 2001/2870
- The CfBT/Lambeth Education Action Zone (Extension and Variation) Order 2001 SI 2001/2871
- The Barnsley Education Action Zone (Extension and Variation) Order 2001 SI 2001/2872
- The Newham Education Action Zone (Extension and Variation) Order 2001 SI 2001/2873
- The Children (Leaving Care) (England) Regulations 2001 SI 2001/2874
- The Newcastle Education Action Zone (Extension) Order 2001 SI 2001/2876
- The Learning and Skills Council for England (Supplementary Functions) Order 2001 SI 2001/2877
- The Children (Leaving Care) Act 2000 (Commencement 1) (England) Order 2001 SI 2001/2878
- The Value Added Tax (Refund of Tax to Museums and Galleries) Order 2001 SI 2001/2879
- The Free Zone (Southampton) Designation Order 2001 SI 2001/2880
- The Free Zone (Liverpool) Designation Order 2001 SI 2001/2881
- The Free Zone (Prestwick Airport) Designation Order 2001 SI 2001/2882
- The Road Traffic (Permitted Parking Area and Special Parking Area) (City of Birmingham) Order 2001 SI 2001/2883
- The Northern Ireland Act 2000 (Suspension of Devolved Government) Order 2001 SI 2001/2884
- The Water Supply (Water Quality) (Amendment) Regulations 2001 SI 2001/2885
- The Amalgamation of the Buckingham and River Ouzel Internal Drainage Districts Order 2001 SI 2001/2886
- The National Health Service (Charges for Drugs and Appliances) (Electronic Communications) Order 2001 SI 2001/2887
- The National Health Service (Pharmaceutical Services) and (Misuse of Drugs) (Electronic Communications) Order 2001 SI 2001/2888
- The Prescription Only Medicines (Human Use) (Electronic Communications) Order 2001 SI 2001/2889
- The National Health Service (General Medical Services) (Electronic Communications) Order 2001 SI 2001/2890
- The Higher Education Funding Council for England (Supplementary Functions) Order 2001 SI 2001/2891
- The Education (Student Support) (European Institutions) (Amendment) (No. 2) Regulations 2001 SI 2001/2892
- The Education (Student Support) (Dance and Drama) (Amendment) Regulations 2001 SI 2001/2893
- The Education (Grant) (Financial Support for Students) Regulations 2001 SI 2001/2894
- The Northern Ireland Act 2000 (Restoration of Devolved Government) Order 2001 SI 2001/2895
- The Education (Teachers' Qualifications and Health Standards) (England) (Amendment 2) Regulations 2001 SI 2001/2896
- The Education (Induction Arrangements for School Teachers) (Consolidation) (England) Regulations 2001 SI 2001/2897
- The Shena Simon College, Manchester (Dissolution) Order 2001 SI 2001/2898
- The Education (School Teachers' Pay and Conditions) (No. 4) Order 2001 SI 2001/2899

=== 2901–3000 ===
- The Air Navigation (Restriction of Flying) (Nuclear Installations) (Revocation) Regulations 2001 SI 2001/2904
- The National Assembly for Wales (Elections: Nomination Papers) (Welsh Form) Order 2001 SI 2001/2914
- The New Deal (Lone Parents) (Miscellaneous Provisions) Order 2001 SI 2001/2915
- The EC Competition Law (Articles 84 and 85)Enforcement Regulations 2001 SI 2001/2916
- The Limited Liability Partnerships (Welsh Language Forms) Regulations 2001 SI 2001/2917
- The Social Security (Medical Evidence) and Statutory Maternity Pay (Medical Evidence) (Amendment) Regulations 2001 SI 2001/2931
- The City of Salford (Castlefield Bridge) Scheme 2000 Confirmation Instrument 2001 SI 2001/2932
- The Education (School Performance Targets) (England) (Amendment) (No. 2) Regulations 2001 SI 2001/2944
- The Control of Pollution (Oil Storage) (England) Regulations 2001 SI 2001/2954
- The Public Offers of Securities (Exemptions) Regulations 2001 SI 2001/2955
- The Financial Services and Markets Act 2000 (Official Listing of Securities) Regulations 2001 SI 2001/2956
- The Financial Services and Markets Act 2000 (Official Listing of Securities) (Transitional Provisions) Order 2001 SI 2001/2957
- The Financial Services and Markets Act 2000 (Offers of Securities) Order 2001 SI 2001/2958
- The Community Drivers' Hours (Foot-and-Mouth Disease) (Temporary Exception) (No. 2) (Amendment 4) Regulations 2001 SI 2001/2959
- The Tyne Tunnel (Revision of Tolls and Traffic Classification) Order 2001 SI 2001/2960
- The Education (School Teachers' Pay and Conditions) (No. 5) Order 2001 SI 2001/2962
- The Local Elections (Declaration of Acceptance of Office) (Amendment) (Wales) Order 2001 SI 2001/2963
- The Financial Services and Markets Act 2000 (Consequential Amendments) (Pre-Commencement Modifications) Order 2001 SI 2001/2966
- The Financial Services and Markets Act 2000 (Transitional Provisions, Repeals and Savings) (Financial Services Compensation Scheme) Order 2001 SI 2001/2967
- The Financial Services and Markets Act 2000 (Treatment of Assets of Insurers on Winding Up) Regulations 2001 SI 2001/2968
- The Dartford-Thurrock Crossing (Amendment) Regulations 2001 SI 2001/2973
- The Radiation (Emergency Preparedness and Public Information) Regulations 2001 SI 2001/2975
- The Court of Protection (Amendment) Rules 2001 SI 2001/2977
- The Offshore Installations (Safety Zones) (No. 3) Order 2001 SI 2001/2978
- The Social Security (Incapacity) (Miscellaneous Amendments) Regulations 2001 SI 2001/2979
- The Social Security Amendment (Personal Allowances for Children and Young Persons) Regulations 2001 SI 2001/2980
- The Foot-and-Mouth Disease (Amendment) (Wales) (No. 10) Order 2001 SI 2001/2981
- The Agricultural Holdings (Units of Production) (Wales) Order 2001 SI 2001/2982
- The Agricultural Holdings (Units of Production) (Wales) (No.2) Order 2001 SI 2001/2983
- The Swanage Harbour Revision Order 2001 SI 2001/2984
- The Foster Placement (Children) and Adoption Agencies Amendment (England) Regulations 2001 SI 2001/2992
- The Competition Act 1998 (Section 11 Exemption) Regulations 2001 SI 2001/2993
- The Foot-and-Mouth Disease (Amendment) (England) (No.11) Order 2001 SI 2001/2994
- The Plant Health (Forestry) (Great Britain) (Amendment) Order 2001 SI 2001/2995
- The Community Legal Service (Funding) (Amendment 2) Order 2001 SI 2001/2996
- The Community Legal Service (Financial) (Amendment 2) Regulations 2001 SI 2001/2997

=== 3001–3100 ===
- The Common Agricultural Policy (Paying Agencies: Competent Authority and Co-ordinating Body) Regulations 2001 SI 2001/3020
- The Gaming Duty (Amendment) Regulations 2001 SI 2001/3021
- The Excise Duty Points (Duty Suspended Movements of Excise Goods) Regulations 2001 SI 2001/3022
- The Social Fund Maternity and Funeral Expenses (General) Amendment Regulations 2001 SI 2001/3023
- The Local Authorities (Companies) (Amendment 2) (England) Order 2001 SI 2001/3042
- The General Optical Council (Membership) Order of Council 2001 SI 2001/3057
- The Road Traffic (Permitted Parking Area and Special Parking Area) (Metropolitan Borough of Oldham) Order 2001 SI 2001/3058
- The Road Traffic (Permitted Parking Area and Special Parking Area) (City of Stoke-on-Trent) Order 2001 SI 2001/3059
- The Agricultural Holdings (Units of Production) (Wales)(No.3) Order 2001 SI 2001/3064
- The National Health Service (Travelling Expenses and Remission of Charges) Amendment (No. 2) Regulations 2001 SI 2001/3065
- The National Health Service (Optical Charges and Payments) and (General Ophthalmic Services) Amendment (No. 2) Regulations 2001 SI 2001/3066
- The National Assistance (Residential Accommodation) (Disregarding of Resources) (England) Regulations 2001 SI 2001/3067
- The National Assistance (Residential Accommodation) (Additional Payments) (England) Regulations 2001 SI 2001/3068
- The National Assistance (Residential Accommodation) (Relevant Contributions) (England) Regulations 2001 SI 2001/3069
- The Children (Leaving Care) Act 2000 (Commencement 2 and Consequential Provisions) Order 2001 SI 2001/3070
- The Education (Fast Track Bursaries and Grants) (England) Regulations 2001 SI 2001/3071
- The Value Added Tax Tribunals (Amendment) Rules 2001 SI 2001/3073
- The Children (Leaving Care) Social Security Benefits Regulations 2001 SI 2001/3074
- The Financial Services and Markets Act 2000 (Transitional Provisions and Savings) (Civil Remedies, Discipline, Criminal Offences etc.) (No. 2) Order 2001 SI 2001/3083
- The Financial Services and Markets Act 2000 (Gibraltar) Order 2001 SI 2001/3084
- The Tax Credits (Miscellaneous Amendments 8) Regulations 2001 SI 2001/3085
- The Tax Credits (Miscellaneous Amendments 8) (Northern Ireland) Regulations 2001 SI 2001/3086
- The Federal Republic of Yugoslavia (Freezing of Funds) (Amendment) Regulations 2001 SI 2001/3087
- The General Betting Duty Regulations 2001 SI 2001/3088
- The Finance Act 2001 (Commencement) Order 2001 SI 2001/3089

=== 3101–3200 ===
- The Organic Farming (England Rural Development Programme) (Amendment) Regulations 2001 SI 2001/3139
- The Foot-and-Mouth Disease (Amendment) (England) (No. 12) Order 2001 SI 2001/3140
- The Environmental Protection (Controls on Injurious Substances) (Amendment) Regulations 2001 SI 2001/3141
- The Energy Information and Energy Efficiency (Miscellaneous Amendments) Regulations 2001 SI 2001/3142
- The Foot-and-Mouth Disease (Amendment) (Wales) (No. 11) Order 2001 SI 2001/3145
- The Special Waste (Amendment) (England and Wales) Regulations 2001 SI 2001/3148
- The Criminal Justice and Police Act 2001 (Commencement 2) Order 2001 SI 2001/3150
- The Lewes Tertiary College (Dissolution) Order 2001 SI 2001/3153
- Eastbourne College of Arts and Technology (Dissolution) Order 2001 SI 2001/3154
- The Housing Act 1996 (Commencement 13) Order 2001 SI 2001/3164
- The Export of Goods (Control) (Amendment 2) Order 2001 SI 2001/3166
- The Health and Social Care Act 2001 (Commencement 2) (England) Order 2001 SI 2001/3167
- The Waste (Foot-and-Mouth Disease) (England) (Amendment) Regulations 2001 SI 2001/3189
- The Wireless Telegraphy (Broadband Fixed Wireless Access Licences) Regulations 2001 SI 2001/3193
- The Potatoes Originating in Germany (Notification) (England) Order 2001 SI 2001/3194
- The Environmentally Sensitive Areas (Stage II) Designation (Amendment) Order 2001 SI 2001/3195
- The Environmentally Sensitive Areas (Stage III) Designation (Amendment) Order 2001 SI 2001/3196
- The Environmentally Sensitive Areas (Stage IV) Designation (Amendment) Order 2001 SI 2001/3197
- The Common Agricultural Policy (Protection of Community Arrangements) (Amendment) Regulations 2001 SI 2001/3198

=== 3201–3300 ===
- The Education (Funding for Teacher Training) Designation Order 2001 SI 2001/3202
- The Southampton Community Health Services National Health Service Trust (Establishment) Amendment (No.2) Order 2001 SI 2001/3203
- The A556 Trunk Road (Plumley Moor Road Junction Improvement) (Detrunking) Order 2001 SI 2001/3206
- The Pensions Appeal Tribunals (Scotland) (Amendment) Rules 2001 SI 2001/3207
- The Road Vehicles (Construction and Use) (Amendment) (No. 4) Regulations 2001 SI 2001/3208
- The Merchant Shipping (Domestic Passenger Ships) (Safety Management Code) Regulations 2001 SI 2001/3209
- The Social Security (Jobcentre Plus Interviews) Regulations 2001 SI 2001/3210
- The Environment Act 1995 (Commencement 20 and Saving Provision) (Wales) Order 2001 SI 2001/3211
- The Brooke House Sixth Form College (Incorporation) Order 2001 SI 2001/3212
- The Brooke House Sixth Form College (Government) Regulations 2001 SI 2001/3213
- The Data Protection (Notification and Notification Fees) (Amendment) Regulations 2001 SI 2001/3214
- The Vehicles (Crime) Act 2001 (Commencement 1) Order 2001 SI 2001/3215
- The Housing (Right to Buy) (Priority of Charges) (England) (No. 2) Order 2001 SI 2001/3219
- The Data Protection (Subject Access) (Fees and Miscellaneous Provisions) (Amendment) Regulations 2001 SI 2001/3223
- The Northern Ireland Act 2000 (Suspension of Devolved Government) (No.2) Order 2001 SI 2001/3230
- The Northern Ireland Act 2000 (Restoration of Devolved Government) (No.2) Order 2001 SI 2001/3231
- The Carriers' Liability (Clandestine Entrants) (Application to Rail Freight) (Amendment) Regulations 2001 SI 2001/3232
- The Carriers' Liability (Clandestine Entrants) (Code of Practice for Freight Shuttle Wagons) Order 2001 SI 2001/3233
- The Armed Forces Act 2001 (Commencement1) Order 2001 SI 2001/3234
- The Education (School Teachers' Pay and Conditions) (No. 6) Order 2001 SI 2001/3243
- The Accounts and Audit (Amendment) (England) Regulations 2001 SI 2001/3244
- The Bracknell Forest Primary Care Trust (Establishment) Order 2001 SI 2001/3245
- The Windsor, Ascot and Maidenhead Primary Care Trust (Establishment) Order 2001 SI 2001/3246
- The Social Security Fraud Act 2001 (Commencement 1) Order 2001 SI 2001/3251
- The Social Security (Notification of Change of Circumstances) Regulations 2001 SI 2001/3252
- The Disability Discrimination (Providers of Services) (Adjustment of Premises) Regulations 2001 SI 2001/3253
- The Working Time (Amendment) Regulations 2001 SI 2001/3256
- The Housing (Right to Acquire) (Electronic Communications) (England) Order 2001 SI 2001/3257
- The Southern Norfolk Primary Care Trust (Establishment) Order 2001 SI 2001/3258
- The Community Drivers' Hours (Foot-and-Mouth Disease) (Temporary Exception) (No. 2) (Amendment 5) Regulations 2001 SI 2001/3260
- The Electricity (Unmetered Supply) Regulations 2001 SI 2001/3263
- The Utilities Act 2000 (Transitional Provisions) (No. 2) Regulations 2001 SI 2001/3264
- The Electricity (Standards of Performance) Regulations 2001 SI 2001/3265
- The Utilities Act 2000 (Commencement 6 and Transitional Provisions ) Order 2001 SI 2001/3266
- The Gas (Connection Charges) Regulations 2001 SI 2001/3267
- The Electricity from Non-Fossil Fuel Sources Saving Arrangements (Amendment) Order 2001 SI 2001/3268
- The Electricity from Non-Fossil Fuel Sources (Scotland) Saving Arrangements Order 2001 SI 2001/3269
- The Electricity (Class Exemptions from the Requirement for a Licence) Order 2001 SI 2001/3270
- The Import and Export Restrictions (Foot-and-Mouth Disease) (Wales) (No. 9) (Amendment) (No. 2) Regulations 2001 SI 2001/3283
- The Import and Export Restrictions (Foot-and-Mouth Disease) (No. 9) (Amendment) (No. 2) Regulations 2001 SI 2001/3284
- The Foot-and-Mouth Disease (Export of Vehicles) (Disinfection of Tyres) (Amendment) (No. 7) Regulations 2001 SI 2001/3285
- The Fossil Fuel Levy (Amendment) (No. 2) Regulations 2001 SI 2001/3286
- The Railway Safety (Miscellaneous Amendments) Regulations 2001 SI 2001/3291
- The Police (Amendment) Regulations 2001 SI 2001/3293
- The Health and Social Care Act 2001 (Commencement 3) (England) Order 2001 SI 2001/3294
- The Chiltern and South Bucks Primary Care Trust (Establishment) Order 2001 SI 2001/3295
- The Wycombe Primary Care Trust (Establishment) Order 2001 SI 2001/3296
- The Rushmoor and Hart Primary Care Trust (Establishment) Order 2001 SI 2001/3297
- The Excise Duty (Payments in Case of Error or Delay) Regulations 2001 SI 2001/3299
- The Finance Act 2001 (Commencement 2 and Saving Provision) Order 2001 SI 2001/3300

=== 3301–3400 ===
- The Access to the Countryside (Maps in Draft Form) (England) Regulations 2001 SI 2001/3301
- The Energy Efficiency (Ballasts for Fluorescent Lighting) Regulations 2001 SI 2001/3316
- Quality Partnership Schemes (Existing Facilities) Regulations 2001 SI 2001/3317
- The National Health Service (Travelling Expenses and Remission of Charges) (Amendment) (No.2) (Wales) Regulations 2001 SI 2001/3322
- The National Health Service (Optical Charges and Payments) and (General Ophthalmic Services) (Amendment) (No.3) (Wales) Regulations 2001 SI 2001/3323
- The Motor Vehicles (Tests) (Amendment) (No. 2) Regulations 2001 SI 2001/3330
- The Care Standards Act 2000 (Commencement 8) (England) Order 2001 SI 2001/3331
- The Building (Amendment) Regulations 2001 SI 2001/3335
- The Building (Approved Inspectors etc.) (Amendment) Regulations 2001 SI 2001/3336
- The Air Passenger Duty and Other Indirect Taxes (Interest Rate) (Amendment) Regulations 2001 SI 2001/3337
- The Financial Services and Markets Act 2000 (Controllers) (Exemption) (No. 2) Order 2001 SI 2001/3338
- The Food Industry Development (Amendment) (England) Scheme 2001 SI 2001/3339
- The Merchant Shipping (Fees) (Amendment) Regulations 2001 SI 2001/3340
- The Criminal Defence Service (Funding) (Amendment 3) Order 2001 SI 2001/3341
- The Transport Act 2000 (Commencement 7) Order 2001 SI 2001/3342
- The Motor Vehicles (Access to Driver Licensing Records) Regulations 2001 SI 2001/3343
- The Curfew Order and Curfew Requirement (Responsible Officer) (Amendment) Order 2001 SI 2001/3344
- The Curfew Condition (Responsible Officer) (Amendment) Order 2001 SI 2001/3345
- The Community Order (Electronic Monitoring of Requirements) (Responsible Officer) (Amendment) Order 2001 SI 2001/3346
- The Local Authorities (Goods and Services) (Public Bodies) (England) (No. 4) Order 2001 SI 2001/3347
- The Railway Administration Order Rules 2001 SI 2001/3352
- The Gas (Applications for Licences and Extensions and Restrictions of Licences) Regulations 2001 SI 2001/3353
- The Electricity (Applications for Licences and Extensions and Restrictions of Licences) Regulations 2001 SI 2001/3354
- The Borough of Darlington (Electoral Changes) Order 2001 SI 2001/3357
- The District of East Riding (Electoral Changes) Order 2001 SI 2001/3358
- The Borough of North Lincolnshire (Electoral Changes) Order 2001 SI 2001/3359
- The City of Kingston upon Hull (Electoral Changes) Order 2001 SI 2001/3360
- The Borough of North East Lincolnshire (Electoral Changes) Order 2001 SI 2001/3361
- The City of York (Electoral Changes) Order 2001 SI 2001/3362
- The Terrorism (United Nations Measures) (Channel Islands) Order 2001 SI 2001/3363
- The Terrorism (United Nations Measures) (Isle of Man) Order 2001 SI 2001/3364
- The Terrorism (United Nations Measures) Order 2001 SI 2001/3365
- The Terrorism (United Nations Measures) (Overseas Territories) Order 2001 SI 2001/3366
- The Civil Aviation Act 1982 (Overseas Territories) (No. 2) Order 2001 SI 2001/3367
- The Social Fund Cold Weather Payments (General) Amendment Regulations 2001 SI 2001/3368
- The Financial Services and Markets Act 2000 (Interim Permissions) Order 2001 SI 2001/3374
- The Social Fund Winter Fuel Payment (Amendment) Regulations 2001 SI 2001/3375
- The Local Authorities (Standing Orders) (England) Regulations 2001 SI 2001/3384
- The Criminal Justice and Court Services Act 2000 (Commencement 8) Order 2001 SI 2001/3385
- The National Health Service (General Medical Services) Amendment (No.3) Regulations 2001 SI 2001/3386
- The Feeding Stuffs and the Feeding Stuffs (Enforcement) (Amendment) (England) Regulations 2001 SI 2001/3389
- The Fishing Vessels (Decommissioning) Scheme 2001 SI 2001/3390
- The Road Traffic (Permitted Parking Area and Special Parking Area) (District of Herefordshire) Order 2001 SI 2001/3397
- The Poultry Meat, Farmed Game Bird Meat and Rabbit Meat (Hygiene and Inspection) (Amendment) (England) Regulations 2001 SI 2001/3399

=== 3401–3500 ===
- The Local Government Pension Scheme (Amendment 2) Regulations 2001 SI 2001/3401
- The Northern Ireland (Sentences) Act 1998 (Specified Organisations) Order 2001 SI 2001/3411
- Mid-Norfolk Railway Order 2001 (SI 2001/3413)
- The Electricity Act 1989 (Commencement 3) Order 2001 SI 2001/3419
- The Electricity Council (Dissolution) Order 2001 SI 2001/3420
- The Central Electricity Generating Board (Dissolution) Order 2001 SI 2001/3421
- The Land Registration (District Registries) Order 2001 SI 2001/3424
- The Legal Aid in Criminal and Care Proceedings (Costs) (Amendment 2) Regulations 2001 SI 2001/3425
- The Rail Vehicle Accessibility (North Western Trains Class 175/0 and Class 175/1 Vehicles) Exemption Order 2001 SI 2001/3434
- The Education (School Teachers' Pay and Conditions) (No. 7) Order 2001 SI 2001/3435
- The Financial Services and Markets Act 2000 (Commencement 6) Order 2001 SI 2001/3436
- The Financial Services and Markets Act 2000 (Disclosure of Confidential Information) (Amendment) Regulations 2001 SI 2001/3437
- The Litigants in Person (Costs and Expenses) (Magistrates' Courts) Order 2001 SI 2001/3438
- The Financial Services and Markets Act 2000 (Official Listing of Securities) (Amendment) Regulations 2001 SI 2001/3439
- The National Assistance (Residential Accommodation) (Additional Payments and Assessment of Resources) (Amendment) (England) Regulations 2001 SI 2001/3441
- The Colours in Food (Amendment) (England) Regulations 2001 SI 2001/3442
- The Children (Protection from Offenders) (Amendment) (Wales) Regulations 2001 SI 2001/3443
- The Merchant Shipping and Fishing Vessels (Safety Signs and Signals) Regulations 2001 SI 2001/3444
- The Education (City Academies) Order 2001 SI 2001/3445
- The Education (School Performance Information) (England) Regulations 2001 SI 2001/3446
- The Import and Export Restrictions (Foot-and-Mouth Disease) (No. 10) Regulations 2001 SI 2001/3451
- The Foot-and-Mouth Disease (Export of Vehicles) (Disinfection of Tyres) (No. 2) Regulations 2001 SI 2001/3452
- The Value Added Tax (Refund of Tax) Order 2001 SI 2001/3453
- The Tax Credits (Miscellaneous Amendments 9) Regulations 2001 SI 2001/3454
- The Education (Special Educational Needs) (England) (Consolidation) Regulations 2001 SI 2001/3455
- The Tax Credits (Miscellaneous Amendments 9) (Northern Ireland) Regulations 2001 SI 2001/3456
- The Race Relations Act 1976 (General Statutory Duty) Order 2001 SI 2001/3457
- The Race Relations Act 1976 (Statutory Duties) Order 2001 SI 2001/3458
- The Import and Export Restrictions (Foot-And-Mouth Disease) (Wales) (No. 10) Regulations 2001 SI 2001/3459
- The Feeding Stuffs and the Feeding Stuffs (Enforcement) (Amendment) (Wales) Regulations 2001 SI 2001/3461
- The Public Record Office (Fees) (No. 2) Regulations 2001 SI 2001/3462
- The Burnley, Pendle and Rossendale Primary Care Trust (Establishment) Order 2001 SI 2001/3463
- The Fylde Primary Care Trust (Establishment) Order 2001 SI 2001/3464
- The Social Security Amendment (Capital Disregards) (No. 2) Regulations 2001 SI 2001/3481
- The City of Derby (Electoral Changes) Order 2001 SI 2001/3482
- The Motor Vehicles (Driving Licences) (Amendment) (No. 5) Regulations 2001 SI 2001/3486
- The Wyre Primary Care Trust (Establishment) Order 2001 SI 2001/3487
- The Ashton, Leigh and Wigan Primary Care Trust (Establishment) Order 2001 SI 2001/3488
- The Hyndburn and Ribble Valley Primary Care Trust (Establishment) Order 2001 SI 2001/3489
- The Central Liverpool Primary Care Trust (Establishment) Order 2001 SI 2001/3490
- The Preston Primary Care Trust (Establishment) Order 2001 SI 2001/3491
- The South Liverpool Primary Care Trust (Establishment) Order 2001 SI 2001/3492
- The North Liverpool Primary Care Trust (Establishment) Order 2001 SI 2001/3493
- The Drug Abstinence Order (Responsible Officer) (No. 2) Order 2001 SI 2001/3494
- The European Communities (Designation) (No. 3) Order 2001 SI 2001/3495
- The Education (Inspectors of Schools in England) (No. 3) Order 2001 SI 2001/3496
- The British Nationality Act 1981 (Amendment of Schedule 6) Order 2001 SI 2001/3497
- The Consular Fees (Amendment) Order 2001 SI 2001/3498
- The Landmines Act 1998 (Overseas Territories) Order 2001 SI 2001/3499
- The Transfer of Functions (Miscellaneous) Order 2001 SI 2001/3500

=== 3501–3600 ===
- The Reciprocal Enforcement of Maintenance Orders (Designation of Reciprocating Countries) Order 2001 SI 2001/3501
- The Ministerial and other Salaries Order 2001 SI 2001/3502
- The Transfer of Functions (Fishery Harbours) Order 2001 SI 2001/3503
- The Scotland Act 1998 (Transfer of Functions to the Scottish Ministers etc.) (No. 2) Order 2001 SI 2001/3504
- The Education (Inspectors of Education and Training in Wales) (No. 2) Order 2001 SI 2001/3505
- The Transfer of Functions (War Pensions etc.) Order 2001 SI 2001/3506
- The Milk Marketing Board (Residuary Functions) (Amendment) Regulations 2001 SI 2001/3507
- The Community Drivers' Hours (Foot-and-Mouth Disease) (Temporary Exception) (No. 2)(Amendment 6) Regulations 2001 SI 2001/3508
- The Import and Export Restrictions (Foot-and-Mouth Disease) (No.10) (Fees) Regulations 2001 SI 2001/3509
- The Seeds (National Lists of Varieties) Regulations 2001 SI 2001/3510
- The Import and Export Restrictions (Foot-And-Mouth Disease) (Wales) (No. 10) (Fees) Regulations 2001 SI 2001/3511
- The Passenger Car (Fuel Consumption and CO_{2} Emissions Information) Regulations 2001 SI 2001/3523
- The A1 Trunk Road (A645 Slip Roads and A162 Slip Roads) (Detrunking) Order 2001 SI 2001/3524
- The Pneumoconiosis etc. (Workers' Compensation) (Payment of Claims) (Amendment) Regulations 2001 SI 2001/3525
- The Political Parties, Elections and Referendums Act 2000 (Commencement 2) Order 2001 SI 2001/3526
- The Financial Services and Markets Act 2000 (Commencement 7) Order 2001 SI 2001/3538
- The Contracting Out of Functions (Tribunal Staff) Order 2001 SI 2001/3539
- The Local Government Elections (Wales) Order 2001 SI 2001/3540
- The Potatoes Originating in Germany, Notification (Wales) Order 2001 SI 2001/3541
- The Financial Services and Markets Act 2000 (Law Applicable to Contracts of Insurance) (Amendment) Regulations 2001 SI 2001/3542
- The Financial Services and Markets Act 2000 (Regulated Activities) (Amendment) Order 2001 SI 2001/3544
- The Special Waste (Amendment) (Wales) Regulations 2001 SI 2001/3545
- The Specified Risk Material (Amendment) (Wales) (No.2) Regulations 2001 SI 2001/3546
- The Council Tax and Non-Domestic Rating (Demand Notices) (England) (Amendment) Regulations 2001 SI 2001/3554
- The Borough of Swale (Electoral Changes) Order 2001 SI 2001/3555
- The District of Thanet (Electoral Changes) Order 2001 SI 2001/3556
- The District of Sevenoaks (Electoral Changes) Order 2001 SI 2001/3557
- The District of Shepway (Electoral Changes) Order 2001 SI 2001/3558
- The Borough of Tunbridge Wells (Electoral Changes) Order 2001 SI 2001/3559
- The Borough of Dartford (Electoral Changes) Order 2001 SI 2001/3560
- The Rent Officers (Housing Benefit Functions) (Amendment) Order 2001 SI 2001/3561
- The Family Health Services Appeal Authority (Change of Name) Order 2001 SI 2001/3562
- The Borough of Ashford (Electoral Changes) Order 2001 SI 2001/3563
- The City of Canterbury (Electoral Changes) Order 2001 SI 2001/3564
- The Road Traffic (Designation of Permitted Parking Area and Special Parking Area) (County of Cumbria) (City of Carlisle) Order 2001 SI 2001/3565
- The Potatoes Originating in Egypt (Amendment) (England) Regulations 2001 SI 2001/3574
- The Local Authorities (Model Code of Conduct) (England) Order 2001 SI 2001/3575
- The Parish Councils (Model Code of Conduct) Order 2001 SI 2001/3576
- The National Park and Broads Authorities (Model Code of Conduct) (England) Order 2001 SI 2001/3577
- The Police Authorities (Model Code of Conduct) Order 2001 SI 2001/3578
- The Financial Services and Markets Act 2000 (Dissolution of the Board of Banking Supervision) (Transitional Provisions) Order 2001 SI 2001/3582
- The Import and Export Restrictions (Foot-And-Mouth Disease) (No.11) Regulations 2001 SI 2001/3584
- The Pollution Prevention and Control (Designation of Landfill Directive) Order 2001 SI 2001/3585
- The Borough of Maidstone (Electoral Changes) Order 2001 SI 2001/3586
- The Borough of Gravesham (Electoral Changes)Order 2001 SI 2001/3587
- The District of Dover (Electoral Changes) Order 2001 SI 2001/3588
- The Import and Export Restrictions (Foot-And-Mouth Disease) (Wales) (No. 11) Regulations 2001 SI 2001/3589
- The Animals and Animal Products (Examination for Residues and Maximum Residue Limits) (Amendment) Regulations 2001 SI 2001/3590
- The Bankruptcy (Financial Services and Markets Act 2000) (Scotland) Rules 2001 SI 2001/3591
- The Financial Services and Markets Act 2000 (Transitional Provisions) (Partly Completed Procedures) Order 2001 SI 2001/3592

=== 3601–3700 ===
- The Greater London Authority Act 1999 (Commencement 10) Order 2001 SI 2001/3603
- The A596 Trunk Road (Northside Junction, Workington) (Detrunking) Order 2001 SI 2001/3604
- The A596 Trunk Road (Northside Junction, Workington) Order 2001 SI 2001/3605
- The Goods Vehicles (Authorisation of International Journeys) (Fees) Regulations 2001 SI 2001/3606
- The Leeds West Primary Care Trust (Establishment) Order 2001 SI 2001/3609
- The Leeds North East Primary Care Trust (Establishment) Order 2001 SI 2001/3610
- The A557 Trunk Road (M62 Junction 7 To Queensway) (Detrunking) Order 2001 SI 2001/3611
- The Tonbridge and Malling (Electoral Changes) Order 2001 SI 2001/3615
- Postal Services Act 2000 (Disclosure of Information) Order 2001 SI 2001/3617
- The Local Government Overseas Assistance (London Pensions Fund Authority) Order 2001 SI 2001/3618
- The Health and Social Care Act 2001 (Commencement 4) (England) Order 2001 SI 2001/3619
- The East Leeds Primary Care Trust (Establishment) Order 2001 SI 2001/3620
- The Homerton Hospital National Health Service Trust (Change of Name) Order 2001 SI 2001/3621
- The South Leeds Primary Care Trust (Establishment) Order 2001 SI 2001/3622
- The Financial Services and Markets Act 2000 (Exemption) (Amendment) Order 2001 SI 2001/3623
- The Financial Services and Markets Act 2000 (Disclosure of Confidential Information) (Amendment) (No. 2) Regulations 2001 SI 2001/3624
- The Financial Services and Markets Act 2000 (Control of Business Transfers) (Requirements on Applicants) Regulations 2001 SI 2001/3625
- The Financial Services and Markets Act 2000 (Control of Transfers of Business Done at Lloyd's) Order 2001 SI 2001/3626
- The South Hampshire Rapid Transit Order 2001 SI 2001/3627
- The Merchant Shipping (Fees) (Amendment 2) Regulations 2001 SI 2001/3628
- The Financial Services and Markets Act 2000 (Consequential Amendments) (Taxes) Order 2001 SI 2001/3629
- The Plant Breeders' Rights (Fees) (Amendment) Regulations 2001 SI 2001/3630
- Education (City Academies) (Subject Areas) Order 2001 SI 2001/3631
- The Financial Services and Markets Tribunal (Legal Assistance) Regulations 2001 SI 2001/3632
- The Financial Services and Markets Tribunal (Legal Assistance Scheme—Costs) Regulations 2001 SI 2001/3633
- The Bankruptcy (Financial Services and Markets Act 2000) Rules 2001 SI 2001/3634
- The Insurers (Winding Up) Rules 2001 SI 2001/3635
- The Financial Services and Markets Act 2000 (Transitional Provisions and Savings) (Business Transfers) Order 2001 SI 2001/3639
- The Financial Services and Markets Act 2000 (Savings, Modifications and Consequential Provisions) (Rehabilitation of Offenders) (Scotland) Order 2001 SI 2001/3640
- The Money Laundering Regulations 2001 SI 2001/3641
- The Electricity Act 1989 (Requirement of Consent for Offshore Wind and Water Driven Generating Stations) (England and Wales) Order 2001 SI 2001/3642
- The Finance Act 1996, Section 167, (Appointed Day) Order 2001 SI 2001/3643
- The Human Rights Act 1998 (Designated Derogation) Order 2001 SI 2001/3644
- The Financial Services and Markets Act 2000 (Misleading Statements and Practices) Order 2001 SI 2001/3645
- The Financial Services and Markets Act 2000 (Transitional Provisions and Savings) (Information Requirements and Investigations) Order 2001 SI 2001/3646
- The Financial Services and Markets Act 2000 (Consequential Amendments and Savings) (Industrial Assurance) Order 2001 SI 2001/3647
- The Financial Services and Markets Act 2000 (Confidential Information) (Bank of England) (Consequential Provisions) Order 2001 SI 2001/3648
- The Financial Services and Markets Act 2000 (Consequential Amendments and Repeals) Order 2001 SI 2001/3649
- The Financial Services and Markets Act 2000 (Miscellaneous Provisions) Order 2001 SI 2001/3650
- The Income Support (General) and Jobseeker's Allowance Amendment Regulations 2001 SI 2001/3651
- The Beet Seeds (Amendment) (Wales) Regulations 2001 SI 2001/3658
- The High Peak and Dales Primary Care Trust (Establishment) Order 2001 SI 2001/3659
- The Leeds North West Primary Care Trust (Establishment) Order 2001 SI 2001/3660
- The Blackpool Primary Care Trust (Establishment) Order 2001 SI 2001/3661
- The Bolton Primary Care Trust (Establishment) Order 2001 SI 2001/3662
- The Community Legal Service (Financial) (Amendment 3) Regulations 2001 SI 2001/3663
- The Cereal Seeds (Amendment) (Wales) Regulations 2001 SI 2001/3664
- The Fodder Plant Seeds (Amendment) (Wales) Regulations 2001 SI 2001/3665
- The Seed Potatoes (Amendment) (Wales) Regulations 2001 SI 2001/3666
- The Vegetable Seeds (Amendment) (Wales) Regulations 2001 SI 2001/3667
- The General Medical Council (Registration (Fees) (Amendment) Regulations) Order of Council 2001 SI 2001/3668
- The Oil and Fibre Plant Seeds (Amendment) (Wales) Regulations 2001 SI 2001/3669
- The Continental Shelf (Designation of Areas) Order 2001 SI 2001/3670
- The European Communities (Definition of Treaties) (European School) Order 2001 SI 2001/3671
- The European Communities (Definition of Treaties) (North Atlantic Salmon Conservation Organization) Order 2001 SI 2001/3672
- The European Communities (Immunities and Privileges of the North Atlantic Salmon Conservation Organization) Order 2001 SI 2001/3673
- The European Communities (Privileges of the European School) Order 2001 SI 2001/3674
- The Northern Ireland Act 1998 (Amendment of Enactment) Order 2001 SI 2001/3675
- The Northern Ireland Act 1998 (Transfer of Functions) Order 2001 SI 2001/3676
- The Friendly Societies Act 1992 (Industrial Assurance) (Channel Islands) Order 2001 SI 2001/3677
- The Registered Designs (Isle of Man) Order 2001 SI 2001/3678
- The National Assembly for Wales (Transfer of Functions) Order 2001 SI 2001/3679
- The Abolition of the Intervention Board for Agricultural Produce (Consequential Provisions)(Wales) Regulations 2001 SI 2001/3680
- The Financial Services and Markets Act 2000 (Prescribed Markets and Qualifying Investments) (Amendment) Order 2001 SI 2001/3681
- The London Underground (East London Line Extension) (No. 2) Order 2001 SI 2001/3682
- The Controlled Drugs (Substances Useful for Manufacture) (Intra-Community Trade) (Amendment) Regulations 2001 SI 2001/3683
- The Import and Export Restrictions (Foot-And-Mouth Disease) (No. 12) Regulations 2001 SI 2001/3684
- The Intervention Board for Agricultural Produce (Abolition) Regulations 2001 SI 2001/3686
- The Social Security Fraud Act 2001 (Commencement 2) Order 2001 SI 2001/3689
- The Occupational Pensions (Revaluation) Order 2001 SI 2001/3690
- The Firemen's Pension Scheme (Pension Sharing) Order 2001 SI 2001/3691
- The Contracting Out (Administrative and Other Court Staff) Order 2001 SI 2001/3698

=== 3701–3800 ===
- The National Institutions Measure 1998 (Amendment) Resolution 2001 SI 2001/3701
- The Import and Export Restrictions (Foot-And-Mouth Disease) (Wales) (No. 12) Regulations 2001 SI 2001/3705
- The Foot-and-Mouth Disease (Amendment) (Wales) (No. 12) Order 2001 SI 2001/3706
- The Channel Tunnel (International Arrangements) (Amendment 4) Order 2001 SI 2001/3707
- The Education (Schools and Further and Higher Education) (Amendment) (Wales) Regulations 2001 SI 2001/3708
- The Farm Waste Grant (Nitrate Vulnerable Zones) (Wales) Scheme 2001 SI 2001/3709
- The Learning and Skills Act 2000 (Consequential Amendments) (Schools) (Wales) Regulations 2001 SI 2001/3710
- The Parent Governor Representatives and Church Representatives (Wales) Regulations 2001 SI 2001/3711
- The Mental Health Act 1983 (Remedial) Order 2001 SI 2001/3712
- The Greater London Authority (Miscellaneous Amendments) (No. 2) Order 2001 SI 2001/3719
- The Income Support (General) (Standard Interest Rate Amendment) (No. 3) Regulations 2001 SI 2001/3721
- The Foot-and-Mouth Disease (Amendment) (England) (No. 13) Order 2001 SI 2001/3722
- The Social Security (Contributions) (Amendment 6) Regulations 2001 SI 2001/3728
- The Friendly Societies Act 1974 (Seal of the Financial Services Authority) Regulations 2001 SI 2001/3729
- The General Medical Council (Professional Performance) (Amendment) Rules Order of Council 2001 SI 2001/3730
- The Local Authorities (Approved Investments) (Amendment) (Wales) Regulations 2001 SI 2001/3731
- The Pennine Care National Health Service Trust (Establishment) and the Tameside and Glossop Community and Priority Services National Health Service Trust (Dissolution) Order 2001 SI 2001/3733
- The Regulation of Investigatory Powers (Technical Advisory Board) Order 2001 SI 2001/3734
- The Civil Legal Aid (General) (Amendment2) Regulations 2001 SI 2001/3735
- The Criminal Justice and Police Act 2001 (Commencement 3) Order 2001 SI 2001/3736
- Education (Teachers' Qualifications and Health Standards) (England) (Amendment) (No. 3) Regulations 2001 SI 2001/3737
- The Health and Social Care Act 2001 (Commencement 6) (England) Order 2001 SI 2001/3738
- The National Health Service (General Ophthalmic Services) Amendment (No. 2) Regulations 2001 SI 2001/3739
- The National Health Service (General Medical Services Supplementary List) Regulations 2001 SI 2001/3740
- The National Health Service (General Dental Services) Amendment (No.6) Regulations 2001 SI 2001/3741
- The National Health Service (General Medical Services) Amendment (No. 4) Regulations 2001 SI 2001/3742
- The Family Health Services Appeal Authority (Primary Care Act) Regulations 2001 SI 2001/3743
- The Abolition of the NHS Tribunal (Consequential Provisions) Regulations 2001 SI 2001/3744
- The Smoke Control Areas (Authorised Fuels) (England) Regulations 2001 SI 2001/3745
- The Variation of Stamp Duties Regulations 2001 SI 2001/3746
- The Stamp Duty (Disadvantaged Areas) Regulations 2001 SI 2001/3747
- The Finance Act 2001, Section 92(8), (Specified Day) Order 2001 SI 2001/3748
- The Sheep and Goats Spongiform Encephalopathy (England and Wales) (Compensation) (Amendment) Order 2001 SI 2001/3749
- The Family Health Services Appeal Authority (Procedure) Rules 2001 SI 2001/3750
- Medicines (Products for Animal Use—Fees) (Amendment 2) Regulations 2001 SI 2001/3751
- The Health and Social Care Act 2001 (Commencement 5) Order 2001 SI 2001/3752
- The Value Added Tax (Special Provisions) (Amendment) Order 2001 SI 2001/3753
- The Value Added Tax (Cars) (Amendment) Order 2001 SI 2001/3754
- The Uncertificated Securities Regulations 2001 SI 2001/3755
- The Accounts and Audit (Amendment) (Wales) Regulations 2001 SI 2001/3760
- The Plant Health (Amendment) (Wales) (No.2) Order 2001 SI 2001/3761
- The Smoke Control Areas (Authorised Fuels)(Wales) Regulations 2001 SI 2001/3762
- The M25 Motorway (Junctions 10 to 16) (Variable Speed Limits) Regulations 2001 SI 2001/3763
- The Mandatory Travel Concessions (Reimbursement Arrangements) (Wales) Regulations 2001 SI 2001/3764
- The Travel Concessions (Extension of Entitlement) (Wales) Order 2001 SI 2001/3765
- The Equipment and Protective Systems Intended for Use in Potentially Explosive Atmospheres (Amendment) Regulations 2001 SI 2001/3766
- The Social Security Amendment (Residential Care and Nursing Homes) Regulations 2001 SI 2001/3767
- The Financial Services and Markets Act 2000 (Scope of Permission Notices) Order 2001 SI 2001/3771
- The Income Tax (Indexation) (No. 2) Order 2001 SI 2001/3773
- The Environmentally Sensitive Areas (Stage II) Designation (Amendment) (No.2) Order 2001 SI 2001/3774
- The Miscellaneous Food Additives (Amendment) (England) (No. 2) Regulations 2001 SI 2001/3775
- The Preserved Rights (Transfer of Responsibilities to Local Authorities) Regulations 2001 SI 2001/3776
- The Personal Equity Plan (Amendment 2) Regulations 2001 SI 2001/3777
- The Individual Savings Account (Amendment 2) Regulations 2001 SI 2001/3778
- The Stamp Duty Reserve Tax (UK Depositary Interests in Foreign Securities) (Amendment) Regulations 2001 SI 2001/3779
- The Education (School Attendance Targets) (England) (Amendment) Regulations 2001 SI 2001/3785
- The National Health Service Trusts (Membership and Procedure) Amendment (No. 2) 2001 (England) Regulations SI 2001/3786
- The Primary Care Trusts (Membership, Procedure and Administration Arrangements) Amendment (No. 2) (England) Regulations 2001 SI 2001/3787
- The Care Trusts (Applications and Consultation) Regulations 2001 SI 2001/3788
- The Greater London Authority Elections (Amendment) Rules 2001 SI 2001/3789
- The Offshore Installations (Safety Zones) (No. 4) Order 2001 SI 2001/3790
- The Health Service Medicines (Information on the Prices of Specified Generic Medicines) Regulations 2001 SI 2001/3798
- The Enterprise Management Incentives (Gross Asset Requirement) Order 2001 SI 2001/3799
- The Financial Services and Markets Act 2000 (Financial Promotion) (Amendment 2) Order 2001 SI 2001/3800

=== 3801–3900 ===
- The Financial Services and Markets Act 2000 (Consequential Amendments) (No. 2) Order 2001 SI 2001/3801
- The Farm Enterprise Grant and Farm Improvement Grant (Wales) Regulations 2001 SI 2001/3806
- The Health and Social Care Act 2001 (Commencement 1) (Wales) Order 2001 SI 2001/3807
- The Derby College (Incorporation) Order 2001 SI 2001/3808
- The Ealing Tertiary College (Dissolution) Order 2001 SI 2001/3809
- The Derby College (Government) Regulations 2001 SI 2001/3810
- The South Wales Sea Fisheries Committee (Levies) Regulations 2001 SI 2001/3811
- The Community Legal Service (Cost Protection) (Amendment 2) Regulations 2001 SI 2001/3812
- The A49 Trunk Road in Cheshire (County of Shropshire Border to the Borough of Warrington Border) (Detrunking) Order 2001 SI 2001/3813
- The Plant Protection Products (Amendment) (No.3) Regulations 2001 SI 2001/3814
- The Education Development Plans (England) Regulations 2001 SI 2001/3815
- The Rehabilitation of Offenders Act 1974 (Exceptions) (Amendment) (No. 2) Order 2001 SI 2001/3816
- The A54 Trunk Road in Cheshire (A51 Tarvin Roundabout to A54/A556 Junction) (Detrunking) Order 2001 SI 2001/3817
- The A51 Trunk Road in Cheshire (A51/A41 Junction to A51/A49 Tarporley Roundabout and A51/A49 Junction (Four Lanes End) to A51/A500 Roundabout) (Detrunking) Order 2001 SI 2001/3818
- The A41 Trunk Road in Cheshire (No Man's Heath Bypass) (Detrunking) Order 2001 SI 2001/3819
- The A41 Trunk Road in Cheshire (County of Shropshire Border to the A41/A51 Junction) (Detrunking) Order 2001 SI 2001/3820
- The Staffordshire Moorlands Primary Care Trust (Establishment) Order 2001 SI 2001/3821
- The A49 Trunk Road (County of Cheshire Border and Borough of Warrington Border to the A49/M56 Roundabout at Stretton) (Detrunking) Order 2001 SI 2001/3822
- The Dudley South Primary Care Trust (Establishment) Order 2001 SI 2001/3823
- The A41 Trunk Road (Birkenhead (Wirral) to M53 Motorway) (Detrunking) Order 2001 SI 2001/3824
- The Dudley Beacon and Castle Primary Care Trust (Establishment) Order 2001 SI 2001/3825
- The A556 Trunk Road in Cheshire (A556/A54 Junction to M6 Motorway) (Detrunking) Order 2001 SI 2001/3826
- The A500 Trunk Road in Cheshire (A500/A51 Roundabout to the A500 Cheerbrook Roundabout) (Detrunking) Order 2001 SI 2001/3827
- The Value Added Tax (Amendment) (No. 3) Regulations 2001 SI 2001/3828
- The Newcastle-under-Lyme Primary Care Trust (Establishment) Order 2001 SI 2001/3829
- The Welfare of Animals (Slaughter or Killing) (Amendment) (England) Regulations 2001 SI 2001/3830
- The Meat (Hygiene and Inspection) (Charges) (Amendment) (No.2) (Wales) Regulations 2001 SI 2001/3831
- The Trade Marks (Amendment) Rules 2001 SI 2001/3832
- The Soundwell College, Bristol (Dissolution) Order 2001 SI 2001/3833
- The Pesticides (Maximum Residue Levels in Crops, Food and Feeding Stuffs) (England and Wales) (Amendment) (No. 3) Regulations 2001 SI 2001/3834
- The Ealing Primary Care Trust (Establishment) Order 2001 SI 2001/3835
- The East Basildon Education Action Zone (Extension and Variation) Order 2001 SI 2001/3836
- The Birmingham (Kitts Green and Shard End) Education Action Zone (Extension and Variation) Order 2001 SI 2001/3837
- The North Southwark Education Action Zone (Extension and Variation) Order 2001 SI 2001/3838
- The Leigh Education Action Zone (Extension and Variation) Order 2001 SI 2001/3839
- The Kingston upon Hull (Bransholme Area) Education Action Zone (Extension and Variation) Order 2001 SI 2001/3840
- The East Brighton Education Action Zone (Extension and Variation) Order 2001 SI 2001/3841
- The Halifax Education Action Zone (Extension and Variation) Order 2001 SI 2001/3842
- The North East Sheffield Education Action Zone (Extension and Variation) Order 2001 SI 2001/3843
- The Plymouth Education Action Zone (Extension and Variation) Order 2001 SI 2001/3844
- The Thetford Education Action Zone (Extension and Variation) Order 2001 SI 2001/3845
- The South Tyneside Education Action Zone (Extension and Variation) Order 2001 SI 2001/3846
- The Birmingham (Aston and Nechells) Education Action Zone (Extension and Variation) Order 2001 SI 2001/3847
- The Nottingham (Bulwell) Education Action Zone (Extension and Variation) Order 2001 SI 2001/3848
- The Medicines (Sale or Supply) (Miscellaneous Provisions) Amendment Regulations 2001 SI 2001/3849
- The Hounslow Primary Care Trust (Establishment) Order 2001 SI 2001/3850
- The Hammersmith and Fulham Primary Care Trust (Establishment) Order 2001 SI 2001/3851
- The Care Standards Act 2000 (Commencement 9 (England) and Transitional and Savings Provisions) Order 2001 SI 2001/3852
- Fur Farming (Compensation Scheme) (England) Order 2001 SI 2001/3853
- Fur Farming (Prohibition) Act 2000 (Commencement) Order 2001 SI 2001/3854
- The Taxes (Interest Rate) (Amendment 3) Regulations 2001 SI 2001/3860
- The Import and Export Restrictions (Foot-And-Mouth Disease) (No. 13) Regulations 2001 SI 2001/3861
- The Import and Export Restrictions (Foot-and-Mouth Disease) (Wales) (No. 13) Regulations 2001 SI 2001/3865
- The Public Telecommunication System Designation (Sprintlink UK Limited) Order 2001 SI 2001/3866
- The Public Telecommunication System Designation (SSE Telecommunications Limited) Order 2001 SI 2001/3867
- The Public Telecommunication System Designation (Midlands Electricity PLC) Order 2001 SI 2001/3868
- The Public Telecommunication System Designation (Alpha Telecom Communications Limited) Order 2001 SI 2001/3869
- The Public Telecommunication System Designation (Eigernet Limited) Order 2001 SI 2001/3870
- The Public Telecommunication System Designation (LETel Limited) Order 2001 SI 2001/3871
- The Veterinary Surgeons and Veterinary Practitioners (Registration) (Amendment) Regulations Order of Council 2001 SI 2001/3872
- The Double Taxation Relief (Surrender of Relievable Tax Within a Group) (Amendment) Regulations 2001 SI 2001/3873
- The Housing (Right to Buy) (Priority of Charges) (England) (No. 3) Order 2001 SI 2001/3874
- The District of Forest of Dean (Electoral Changes) Order 2001 SI 2001/3880
- The Borough of Tewkesbury (Electoral Changes) Order 2001 SI 2001/3881
- The Borough of Cheltenham (Electoral Changes) Order 2001 SI 2001/3882
- The District of Stroud (Parishes and Electoral Changes) Order 2001 SI 2001/3883
- The City of Gloucester (Electoral Changes) Order 2001 SI 2001/3884
- The District of Cotswold (Electoral Changes) Order 2001 SI 2001/3885
- The Severn Bridges Tolls Order 2001 SI 2001/3886
- The Statistics of Trade (Customs and Excise) (Amendment) Regulations 2001 SI 2001/3887
- The Criminal Justice and Police Act 2001 (Consequential Amendments) (Police Ranks) Regulations 2001 SI 2001/3888
- The District of Waveney (Electoral Changes) Order 2001 SI 2001/3889
- The Borough of Ipswich (Electoral Changes) Order 2001 SI 2001/3890
- The District of Mid Suffolk (Electoral Changes) Order 2001 SI 2001/3891
- The District of Suffolk Coastal (Electoral Changes)Order 2001 SI 2001/3892
- The District of Forest Heath (Electoral Changes) Order 2001 SI 2001/3893
- The District of Babergh (Electoral Changes) Order 2001 SI 2001/3894
- The Borough of St Edmundsbury (Electoral Changes) Order 2001 SI 2001/3895
- The Motor Fuel (Composition and Content) (Amendment) Regulations 2001 SI 2001/3896
- The Rural Development Grants (Agriculture and Forestry) (Amendment) Regulations 2001 SI 2001/3897
- The Plant Protection Products (Payments) Regulations 2001 SI 2001/3898
- The Rural Development Grants (Local Communities) Regulations 2001 SI 2001/3899
- The England Rural Development Programme (Project Variations) Regulations 2001 SI 2001/3900

=== 3901–4000 ===
- The Education (External Qualifications) (Description of Tests) (Wales) Regulations 2001 SI 2001/3901
- The Public Trustee (Notices Affecting Land) (Title on Death) (Amendment) Regulations 2001 SI 2001/3902
- The Slaughter Premium (Amendment) Regulations 2001 SI 2001/3906
- The Education (Qualifications, Curriculum and Assessment Authority for Wales) (Conferment of Function) Order 2001 SI 2001/3907
- The Drivers' Hours (Goods Vehicles) (Milk Collection) (Temporary Exemption) (Revocation) Regulations 2001 SI 2001/3908
- The Colours in Food (Amendment)(Wales) Regulations 2001 SI 2001/3909
- The Non-Domestic Rating Contributions (Wales) (Amendment) Regulations 2001 SI 2001/3910
- The Water Supply (Water Quality) Regulations 2001 SI 2001/3911
- The Sea Fishing (Enforcement of Community Satellite Monitoring Measures) Order 2000 Amendment Regulations 2001 SI 2001/3912
- The Electricity from Non-Fossil Fuel Sources (Locational Flexibility) Order 2001 SI 2001/3914
- The Local Authorities (Referendums) (Petitions and Directions) (England) (Amendment) (No. 3) Regulations 2001 SI 2001/3915
- The Non-Domestic Rating (Designation of Rural Areas) (England) Order 2001 SI 2001/3916
- The Scotland Act 1998 (Agency Arrangements) (Specification) Order 2001 SI 2001/3917
- The High Court of Justiciary (Proceedings in the Netherlands) (United Nations) (Variation) Order 2001 SI 2001/3918
- The European Communities (Designation) (No. 4) Order 2001 SI 2001/3919
- The United Nations (International Tribunal) (Rwanda) (Amendment) Order 2001 SI 2001/3920
- The Organisation for the Prohibition of Chemical Weapons (Immunities and Privileges) Order 2001 SI 2001/3921
- The Visiting Forces Act (Application to Bermuda) Order 2001 SI 2001/3922
- The Child Abduction and Custody (Parties to Conventions) (Amendment) Order 2001 SI 2001/3923
- The Double Taxation Relief (Taxes on Income) (The Hashemite Kingdom of Jordan) Order 2001 SI 2001/3924
- The Double Taxation Relief (Taxes on Income) (Lithuania) Order 2001 SI 2001/3925
- The Dentists Act 1984 (Amendment) Order 2001 SI 2001/3926
- The Terrorism Act 2000 (Enforcement of External Orders) Order 2001 SI 2001/3927
- The Civil Jurisdiction and Judgments (Authentic Instruments and Court Settlements) Order 2001 SI 2001/3928
- The Civil Jurisdiction and Judgments Order 2001 SI 2001/3929
- The Landmines Act 1998 (Jersey) Order 2001 SI 2001/3930
- The European Convention on Cinematographic Co-production (Amendment) (No. 2) Order 2001 SI 2001/3931
- The Misuse of Drugs Act 1971 (Modification) Order 2001 SI 2001/3932
- The Criminal Justice (International Co-operation) Act 1990 (Modification) Order 2001 SI 2001/3933
- The Education (Inspectors of Schools in England) (No. 4) Order 2001 SI 2001/3934
- The European Communities (Definition of Treaties) (Partnership Agreement between the Members of the African, Caribbean and Pacific Group of States and the European Community and its Member States (The Cotonou Agreement)) Order 2001 SI 2001/3935
- The Repatriation of Prisoners Act 1984 (Isle of Man) Order 2001 SI 2001/3936
- The Regulatory Reform (Special Occasions Licensing) Order 2001 SI 2001/3937
- The Education (Induction Arrangements for School Teachers) (Consolidation) (England) (Amendment) Regulations 2001 SI 2001/3938
- The Local Elections (Declaration of Acceptance of Office) Order 2001 SI 2001/3941
- The Prescription Only Medicines (Human Use) Amendment (No. 2) Order 2001 SI 2001/3942
- The Education (Special Educational Needs Code of Practice) (Appointed Day) (England) Order 2001 SI 2001/3943
- The Non-Domestic Rating Contributions (England) (Amendment) Regulations 2001 SI 2001/3944
- The Protection of the Euro against Counterfeiting Regulations 2001 SI 2001/3948
- The Registered Designs Regulations 2001 SI 2001/3949
- The Registered Designs (Amendment) Rules 2001 SI 2001/3950
- The Registered Designs (Fees) (Amendment) Rules 2001 SI 2001/3951
- The Rail Vehicle Accessibility (Croydon Tramlink Class CR4000 Vehicles) Exemption Order 2001 SI 2001/3952
- The Rail Vehicle Accessibility (ScotRail Class 170/4 Vehicles) Exemption Order 2001 SI 2001/3953
- The Rail Vehicle Accessibility (Gatwick Express Class 460 Vehicles) Exemption (Amendment) Order 2001 SI 2001/3954
- The Rail Vehicle Accessibility (C2C Class 357/0 Vehicles) Exemption Order 2001 SI 2001/3955
- The Noise Emission in the Environment by Equipment for use Outdoors (Amendment) Regulations 2001 SI 2001/3958
- The Northern Ireland (Date of Next Assembly Poll) Order 2001 SI 2001/3959
- The BSE Monitoring (England) (Amendment) Regulations 2001 SI 2001/3960
- The Local Authorities (Arrangements for the Discharge of Functions) (England) (Amendment) Regulations 2001 SI 2001/3961
- The Local Government Commission for England (Transfer of Functions) Order 2001 SI 2001/3962
- The National Health Service (General Dental Services) Amendment (No. 7) Regulations 2001 SI 2001/3963
- The Medicines (Pharmacies) (Applications for Registration and Fees) Amendment Regulations 2001 SI 2001/3964
- The Care Homes Regulations 2001 SI 2001/3965
- The Environmental Impact Assessment (Uncultivated Land and Semi-natural Areas) (England) Regulations 2001 SI 2001/3966
- The Children's Homes Regulations 2001 SI 2001/3967
- The Private and Voluntary Health Care (England) Regulations 2001 SI 2001/3968
- The National Care Standards Commission (Registration) Regulations 2001 SI 2001/3969
- The Gaming Machines (Maximum Prizes) Regulations 2001 SI 2001/3970
- The Gaming Act (Variation of Monetary Limits) Order 2001 SI 2001/3971
- The Return of Cultural Objects (Amendment) (No. 2) Regulations 2001 SI 2001/3972
- The Friendly Societies (Provisional Repayments for Exempt Business) (Amendment) Regulations 2001 SI 2001/3973
- The Individual Savings Account (Insurance Companies) (Amendment) Regulations 2001 SI 2001/3974
- The Friendly Societies (Modification of the Corporation Tax Acts) (Amendment) Regulations 2001 SI 2001/3975
- The National Care Standards Commission (Fees and Frequency of Inspections) Regulations 2001 SI 2001/3980
- The Goods Vehicles (Enforcement Powers) Regulations 2001 SI 2001/3981
- The Special Educational Needs Tribunal (Time Limits) (Wales) Regulations 2001 SI 2001/3982
- The Public Lending Right Scheme 1982 (Commencement of Variations) Order 2001 SI 2001/3984
- The Preserved Rights (Transfer of Responsibilities to Local Authorities) (Wales) Regulations 2001 SI 2001/3985
- The Countryside Stewardship (Amendment) Regulations 2001 SI 2001/3991
- The Special Educational Needs and Disability Act 2001 (Commencement 2) (Wales) Order 2001 SI 2001/3992
- General Teaching Council for England (Deduction of Fees) Regulations 2001 SI 2001/3993
- The Education Standards Fund (England) (Amendment) Regulations 2001 SI 2001/3994
- The Smoke Control Areas (Authorised Fuels) (Amendment) (Wales) Regulations 2001 SI 2001/3996
- The Misuse of Drugs (Designation) Order 2001 SI 2001/3997
- The Misuse of Drugs Regulations 2001 SI 2001/3998
- The Tonnage Tax (Training Requirement) (Amendment) Regulations 2001 SI 2001/3999
- The National Health Service (General Dental Services) (Amendment) (No.3) (Wales) Regulations 2001 SI 2001/4000

=== 4001–4100 ===
- The Countryside Access (Draft Maps) (Wales) Regulations 2001 SI 2001/4001
- The Countryside Access (Local Access Forums) (Wales) Regulations 2001 SI 2001/4002
- The Environmental Protection (Restriction on Use of Lead Shot) (Wales) Regulations 2001 SI 2001/4003
- The Radioactive Substances (Clocks and Watches) (England and Wales) Regulations 2001 SI 2001/4005
- The Housing Renewal Grants (Prescribed Forms and Particulars) (Amendment2) (Wales) Regulations 2001 SI 2001/4006
- The Housing Renewal Grants (Amendment2) (Wales) Regulations 2001 SI 2001/4007
- The Relocation Grants (Forms of Application) (Amendment 2) (Wales) Regulations 2001 SI 2001/4008
- The Foot-and-Mouth Disease (Amendment) (Wales) (No. 13) Order 2001 SI 2001/4009
- The Maternity and Parental Leave (Amendment) Regulations 2001 SI 2001/4010
- The Electricity and Gas (Energy Efficiency Obligations) Order 2001 SI 2001/4011
- The Crown Court (Amendment) ( 3) Rules 2001 SI 2001/4012
- The Magistrates' Courts (Detention and Forfeiture of Terrorist Cash) (No. 2) Rules 2001 SI 2001/4013
- The Immigration and Asylum Appeals (Procedure) (Amendment) Rules 2001 SI 2001/4014
- The Civil Procedure (Amendment 5) Rules 2001 SI 2001/4015
- The Civil Procedure (Amendment 6) Rules 2001 SI 2001/4016
- Charities (The Bridge House Estates) Order 2001 (SI 2001/4017)
- The Anti-terrorism, Crime and Security Act 2001 (Commencement 1 and Consequential Provisions) Order 2001 SI 2001/4019
- Education (Information About Individual Pupils) (England) Regulations 2001 SI 2001/4020
- The Lottery Duty (Amendment) Regulations 2001 SI 2001/4021
- The Social Security (Loss of Benefit) Regulations 2001 SI 2001/4022
- The Social Security Contributions (Decisions and Appeals) (Amendment) Regulations 2001 SI 2001/4023
- The Referrals to the Special Commissioners Regulations 2001 SI 2001/4024
- The Civil Courts (Amendment) Order 2001 SI 2001/4025
- The Distress for Rent (Amendment) Rules 2001 SI 2001/4026
- The Aggregates Levy (Registration and Miscellaneous Provisions) Regulations 2001 SI 2001/4027
- The Amusement Machine Licence Duty (Medium-prize Machines) Order 2001 SI 2001/4028
- The Foot-and-Mouth Disease (Amendment) (England) (No. 14) Order 2001 SI 2001/4029
- The Road Traffic (NHS Charges) Amendment Regulations 2001 SI 2001/4030
- The National Health Service Trusts (Membership and Procedure) Amendment (No. 3) (England) Regulations 2001 SI 2001/4031
- The Human Rights Act 1998 (Amendment 2)Order 2001 SI 2001/4032
- The Finance Act 2001, section 24 and Schedule 4, (Appointed Day) Order 2001 SI 2001/4033
- The Amusements with Prizes (Variation of Monetary Limits) Order 2001 SI 2001/4034
- The Gaming Act (Variation of Monetary Limits) (No. 2) Order 2001 SI 2001/4035
- The Disabled Facilities Grants and Home Repair Assistance (Maximum Amounts) (Amendment 2) (England) Order 2001 SI 2001/4036
- The Coventry Technical College (Dissolution) Order 2001 SI 2001/4037
- The River Thames (Hungerford Footbridges) (Variation) Order 2001 SI 2001/4038
- The Insurers (Winding Up) (Scotland) Rules 2001 SI 2001/4040
- The Transport Tribunal (Amendment) Rules 2001 SI 2001/4041
- The National Health Service (Travelling Expenses and Remission of Charges) Amendment (No. 3) Regulations 2001 SI 2001/4043
- The National Treatment Agency (Amendment) Regulations 2001 SI 2001/4044
- The Health Authorities (Membership and Procedure) Amendment (England) (No. 3) Regulations 2001 SI 2001/4045
- The Import and Export Restrictions (Foot-And-Mouth Disease) (No. 14) Regulations 2001 SI 2001/4046
- The Import and Export Restrictions (Foot-and-Mouth Disease) (Wales) (No. 14) Regulations 2001 SI 2001/4047
- The BSE Monitoring (Wales) (Amendment) Regulations 2001 SI 2001/4048
- The Welfare Reform and Pensions Act 1999 (Commencement 12) Order 2001 SI 2001/4049
- The Transport Act 2000 (Consequential Amendments) Order 2001 SI 2001/4050
- The Driving Licences (Disqualification until Test Passed) (Prescribed Offence) Order 2001 SI 2001/4051
- The District of Lewes (Electoral Changes) Order 2001 SI 2001/4052
- The District of Wealden (Electoral Changes) Order 2001 SI 2001/4053
- The District of Rother (Electoral Changes) Order 2001 SI 2001/4054
- The City of Brighton and Hove (Electoral Changes) Order 2001 SI 2001/4055
- The Borough of Hastings (Electoral Changes) Order 2001 SI 2001/4056
- The Borough of Eastbourne (Electoral Changes) Order 2001 SI 2001/4057
- The Public Records Act 1958 (Admissibility of Electronic Copies of Public Records) Order 2001 SI 2001/4058
- The Vehicles (Crime) Act 2001 (Commencement 2) Order 2001 SI 2001/4059
- The Street Works (Charges for Occupation of the Highway) (England) Regulations 2001 SI 2001/4060
- The Local Authorities (Contracting Out of Highway Functions) (England) Order 2001 SI 2001/4061
- The Borough of Milton Keynes (Electoral Changes) Order 2001 SI 2001/4062
- The City of Oxford (Electoral Changes) Order 2001 SI 2001/4063
- The District of Vale of White Horse (Electoral Changes) Order 2001 SI 2001/4064
- The District of Cherwell (Electoral Changes) Order 2001 SI 2001/4065
- The Borough of Bedford (Electoral Changes) Order 2001 SI 2001/4066
- The District of Mid Bedfordshire (Electoral Changes) Order 2001 SI 2001/4067
- The District of South Bedfordshire (Electoral Changes) Order 2001 SI 2001/4068
- The Burnley (Parish) Order 2001 (SI 2001/4069)
- The Warwick (Parish) Order 2001 (SI 2001/4070)

=== 4101–4200 ===
- The Anti-terrorism, Crime and Security Act 2001 (Commencement 2) (Scotland) Order 2001 SI 2001/4104
- The Medicines (Products Other Than Veterinary Drugs) (General Sale List) Amendment (No. 2) Order 2001 SI 2001/4111
- The Amalgamation of the Holmewood and Stilton and Yaxley Internal Drainage Districts Order 2001 SI 2001/4114
- The Amalgamation of the Whittlesey and Whittlesey Fifth Internal Drainage Districts Order 2001 SI 2001/4115
- The Lowestoft Primary Care Trust Change of Name and (Establishment) (Amendment) Order 2001 SI 2001/4116
- The Southern Norfolk Primary Care Trust (Establishment) (Amendment) Order 2001 SI 2001/4117
- The Lancashire Care National Health Service Trust (Establishment) and the Guild Community Healthcare National Health Service Trust and the North Sefton and the West Lancashire Community National Health Service Trust (Dissolution) Order 2001 SI 2001/4118
- The Gloucestershire Hospitals and the Gloucestershire Partnership National Health Service Trusts (Establishment) and the East Gloucestershire National Health Service Trust, the Gloucestershire Royal National Health Service Trust and the Severn National Health Service Trust (Dissolution) Order 2001 SI 2001/4119
- The 5 Boroughs Partnership National Health Service Trust (Establishment) and the Warrington Community Health Care National Health Service Trust (Dissolution) Order 2001 SI 2001/4120
- The A47 Trunk Road (Hardwick Roundabout) Order 2001 SI 2001/4121
- The Castle Point and Rochford Primary Care Trust (Establishment) Order 2001 SI 2001/4122
- The Ipswich Primary Care Trust (Establishment) Order 2001 SI 2001/4125
- The Central Suffolk Primary Care Trust (Establishment) Order 2001 SI 2001/4126
- The Suffolk West Primary Care Trust (Establishment) Order 2001 SI 2001/4127
- The Cambridge City Primary Care Trust (Establishment) Order 2001 SI 2001/4128
- The Broadland Primary Care Trust (Establishment) Order 2001 SI 2001/4129
- The Chelmsford Primary Care Trust (Establishment) Order 2001 SI 2001/4130
- The North Norfolk Primary Care Trust (Establishment) Order 2001 SI 2001/4131
- The Hinckley and Bosworth Primary Care Trust (Establishment) Order 2001 SI 2001/4132
- The Barnsley Primary Care Trust (Establishment) Order 2001 SI 2001/4133
- The South Leicestershire Primary Care Trust (Establishment) Order 2001 SI 2001/4134
- The East Lincolnshire Primary Care Trust (Establishment) Order 2001 SI 2001/4135
- The Charnwood and North West Leicestershire Primary Care Trust (Establishment) Order 2001 SI 2001/4136
- The Derbyshire Dales and South Derbyshire Primary Care Trust (Establishment) Order 2001 SI 2001/4137
- The Rotherham Primary Care Trust (Establishment) Order 2001 SI 2001/4138
- The Bristol South and West Primary Care Trust (Establishment) Order 2001 SI 2001/4139
- The Taunton Deane Primary Care Trust (Establishment) Order 2001 SI 2001/4140
- The West Gloucestershire Primary Care Trust (Establishment) Order 2001 SI 2001/4141
- The Central Cornwall Primary Care Trust (Establishment) Order 2001 SI 2001/4142
- The North and East Cornwall Primary Care Trust (Establishment) Order 2001 SI 2001/4143
- The Cheltenham and Tewkesbury Primary Care Trust (Establishment) Order 2001 SI 2001/4144
- The Cotswold and Vale Primary Care Trust (Establishment) Order 2001 SI 2001/4145
- The Bristol North Primary Care Trust (Establishment) Order 2001 SI 2001/4146
- The South Somerset Primary Care Trust (Establishment) Order 2001 SI 2001/4147
- The Suffolk Coastal Primary Care Trust (Establishment) Order 2001 SI 2001/4148
- The Health and Social Care Act 2001 (Commencement 7) (England) Order 2001 SI 2001/4149
- The Care Standards Act 2000 (Commencement 10 (England) and Transitional, Savings and Amendment Provisions) Order 2001 SI 2001/4150

== See also ==
- List of statutory instruments of the United Kingdom
