= Consolidation (law) =

Type of law proposal in the Parliament of the United Kingdom

In law, consolidation is a process which enables several legislative acts to be combined into a single expression of the law, as a means of presenting legal information in a single document for convenience, but without replacing the substantive legal acts themselves (pure consolidation). The formation of a single act which replaces those which are incorporated into it is called recasting. So, recasting often creates a new legal version of a law, while in consolidation, the original law, resolution or treaty remains the only legally authentic text and consolidated versions of them found in databases are usually for reference only.

== United Nations ==
In 2001 the United Nations transferred its platform for electronic storage and distribution of documents, in operation since 1991, from internal accessibility to Web-based access, called the Official Document System (ODS).

The United Nations maintains several consolidation systems of legislation for international law (treaties, legislation, sanctions lists), and specific areas of national or supranational legislation, though it does not consolidate all national laws of all member states into one single repository. National laws are essential for comparative legal studies and for monitoring a State's compliance with the international instruments it has ratified.

The UN recasting focuses on codification, the process of systematizing and formulating rules of international law. This is led by the International Law Commission (ILC), which prepares draft articles that the General Assembly may later adopt as new international conventions.

== European Union ==
Where a European Union (EU) Directive or Regulation has been extended by several amendments, which amend or add to an established Directive or Regulation which remains in force, the European Commission often publishes a "consolidated version" of the act which enables all of its components to be seen in one place, for example there is a consolidated text covering Regulation (EU) No 1025/2012 of the European Parliament and of the Council of 25 October 2012 on European standardisation along with various further acts which apply in the same field. This type of consolidated document "is meant purely as a documentation tool and has no legal effect".

The European Forum of Official Gazettes (EFOG) plays a key role in supporting the development of best practices for the consolidation and codification of legislation across Europe.

== United Kingdom ==
A consolidation bill in the United Kingdom is a bill introduced into the Parliament of the United Kingdom with the intention of consolidating several acts of Parliament or statutory instruments into a single act. Such bills simplify the statute book without significantly changing the state of the law, and are subject to an expedited parliamentary procedure. Once enacted a consolidation bill becomes a consolidation act.

The parliamentary practice of legislating only for small portions of a subject at a time can create undue complexity in statute law. Acts relating to a particular subject often end up scattered over many years, and through the operation of clauses partially repealing or amending former acts, the specific meaning of the law regarding the subject becomes enveloped in intricate or contradictory expressions. For clarity, the law as expressed across many statutes is sometimes recast in a single statute, called a consolidation bill.

By 1911, such bills had been passed dealing with subjects as diverse as customs, stamps and stamp duties, public health, weights and measures, sheriffs, coroners, county courts, housing, municipal corporations, libraries, trustees, copyhold, diseases of animals, merchant shipping, and friendly societies.

These observations apply to the public general acts of the legislature. On the other hand, in settling local acts, such as those relating to railway and canal enterprise, the legislature always inserted certain clauses founded on reasons of public policy applicable to the business in question. To avoid the necessity of constantly re-enacting the same principles in local acts, their common clauses were embodied in separate statutes, and their provisions are ordered to be incorporated in any local act of the description mentioned therein. Such are the Lands Clauses Consolidation Act 1845 (8 & 9 Vict. c. 18),the Companies Clauses Act 1863 and the Railways Clauses Act 1863.

=== Procedure ===
Consolidation bills are introduced in the House of Lords which, by convention, has primacy in these matters. The Lords has the only substantive discussion on the bill, at its second reading, before the bill is sent to the Joint Committee on Consolidation Bills, which may propose amendments to it. Subject to this, the Lords' third reading and all readings in the House of Commons are usually formalities and pass without debate.

Most consolidation bills are proposed in the first instance by a law reform body—either the Law Commission (in England and Wales), the Scottish Law Commission or the Northern Ireland Law Commission—and it is this prior consideration that gives rise to the expedited process afforded to these bills. Every consolidation bill proposed by the Law Commission has been passed by Parliament.

Once a consolidation bill receives royal assent it becomes a consolidation act. An example of a consolidation act is the Powers of Criminal Courts (Sentencing) Act 2000, which consolidated into a single act parts of sentencing legislation previously spread across twelve separate acts. Another example of a consolidation act in relation to sentencing is the Sentencing Act 2020, which significantly replaced many acts in relation to sentencing including the Powers of Criminal Courts (Sentencing) Act 2000.

=== Categories ===
There are five categories of bill which qualify as consolidation bills:

1. Bills which only re-enact existing law.
2. Bills which consolidate previous laws with amendments, proposed in response to recommendations from the Law Commission.
3. Bills to repeal existing legislation, again prepared by the Law Commission.
4. Bills to repeal various obsolete or unnecessary parts of existing legislation.
5. Bills which make corrections and minor improvements to existing legislation, prepared under the Consolidation of Enactments (Procedure) Act 1949.

The first three categories now account for almost all consolidation bills.

=== List of UK consolidation acts ===
The following are consolidation acts "Tax Law Rewrite" acts are not included:

1990s onwards

- Wireless Telegraphy Act 2006 (c. 36)
- Parliamentary Costs Act 2006 (c. 37)
- National Health Service Act 2006 (c. 41)
- National Health Service (Wales) Act 2006 (c. 42)
- National Health Service (Consequential Provisions) Act 2006 (c. 43)
- Companies Act 2006 (c. 46)
- European Parliamentary Elections Act 2002
- The Powers of Criminal Courts (Sentencing) Act 2000 (c. 6)
- Petroleum Act 1998 (c. 17)
- Audit Commission Act 1998 (c. 18) primarily consolidated the provisions of Part III of the Local Government Finance Act 1982, along with certain other legislation relating to the Audit Commission.
- Town and Country Planning (Scotland) Act 1997 (c. 8)
- Planning (Listed Buildings and Conservation Areas) (Scotland) Act 1997 (c. 9)
- Planning (Hazardous Substances) (Scotland) Act 1997 (c. 10)
- Planning (Consequential Provisions) (Scotland) Act 1997 (c. 11)
- Architects Act 1997 (c. 22)
- Lieutenancies Act 1997 (c. 23)
- Nurses, Midwives and Health Visitors Act 1997 (c. 24)
- Justices of the Peace Act 1997 (c. 25)
- Police Act 1996 (c. 16)
- Industrial Tribunals Act 1996 (c. 17), which may now be cited as the Employment Tribunals Act 1996
- Employment Rights Act 1996 (c. 18)
- Education Act 1996 (c. 56)
- School Inspections Act 1996 (c. 57)
- Deer (Scotland) Act 1996 (c. 58)
- Merchant Shipping Act 1995 (c. 21)
- Shipping and Trading Interests (Protection) Act 1995 (c. 22)
- Goods Vehicles (Licensing of Operators) Act 1995 (c. 23)
- Criminal Law (Consolidation) (Scotland) Act 1995 (c. 39)
- Proceeds of Crime (Scotland) Act 1995 (c. 43)
- Criminal Procedure (Scotland) Act 1995 (c. 46)
- Vehicle Excise and Registration Act 1994 (c. 22)
- Value Added Tax Act 1994 (c. 23)
- Drug Trafficking Act 1994 (c. 37)
- Charities Act 1993 (c. 10)
- Clean Air Act 1993 (c. 11)
- Radioactive Substances Act 1993 (c. 12)
- Crofters (Scotland) Act 1993 (c. 44)
- Scottish Land Court Act 1993 (c. 45)
- Health Service Commissioners Act 1993 (c. 46)
- Probation Service Act 1993 (c. 47)
- Pension Schemes Act 1993 (c. 48)
- Pension Schemes (Northern Ireland) Act 1993 (c. 49)
- Social Security Contributions and Benefits Act 1992 (c. 4)
- Social Security Administration Act 1992 (c. 5)
- Social Security (Consequential Provisions) Act 1992 (c. 6)
- Social Security Contributions and Benefits (Northern Ireland) Act 1992 (c. 7)
- Social Security Administration (Northern Ireland) Act 1992 (c. 8)
- Social Security (Consequential Provisions) (Northern Ireland) Act 1992 (c. 9)
- Taxation of Chargeable Gains Act 1992 (c. 12)
- Protection of Badgers Act 1992 (c. 51)
- Trade Union and Labour Relations (Consolidation) Act 1992 (c. 52)
- Tribunals and Inquiries Act 1992 (c. 53)
- Deer Act 1991 (c. 54)
- Agricultural Holdings (Scotland) Act 1991 (c. 55)
- Water Industry Act 1991 (c. 56)
- Water Resources Act 1991 (c. 57)
- Statutory Water Companies Act 1991 (c. 58)
- Land Drainage Act 1991 (c. 59)
- Capital Allowances Act 1990 (c. 1)
- Town and Country Planning Act 1990 (c. 8)
- Planning (Listed Buildings and Conservation Areas) Act 1990 (c. 9)
- Planning (Hazardous Substances) Act 1990 (c. 10)

1980s

- Extradition Act 1989 (c. 33)
- Opticians Act 1989 (c. 44)
- Prisons (Scotland) Act 1989 (c. 45)
- Income and Corporation Taxes Act 1988 (c. 1)
- Coroners Act 1988 (c. 13)
- Court of Session Act 1988 (c. 36)
- Road Traffic Act 1988 (c. 52)
- Road Traffic Offenders Act 1988 (c. 53)
- Road Traffic (Consequential Provisions) Act 1988 (c. 54)
- Housing (Scotland) Act 1987 (c. 26)
- Agricultural Holdings Act 1986 (c. 5)
- Insolvency Act 1986 (c. 45)
- Company Directors Disqualification Act 1986 (c. 46)
- Parliamentary Constituencies Act 1986 (c. 56)
- Companies Act 1985 (c. 6)
- Business Names Act 1985 (c. 7)
- Company Securities (Insider Dealing) Act 1985 (c. 8)
- Companies Consolidation (Consequential Provisions) Act 1985 (c. 9)
- Cinemas Act 1985 (c. 13)
- Reserve Forces (Safeguard of Employment) Act 1985 (c. 17)
- Housing Act 1985 (c 68)
- Housing Associations Act 1985 (c. 69)
- Landlord and Tenant Act 1985 (c. 70)
- Housing (Consequential Provisions) Act 1985 (c. 71)
- Weights and Measures Act 1985 (c. 72)
- Public Health (Control of Disease) Act 1984 (c. 22)
- Registered Homes Act 1984 (c. 23)
- Dentists Act 1984 (c. 24)
- Road Traffic Regulation Act 1984 (c. 27)
- County Courts Act 1984 (c. 28)
- Food Act 1984 (c. 30)
- Mental Health (Scotland) Act 1984 (c. 36)
- Capital Transfer Tax Act 1984 (c. 51)
- Building Act 1984 (c. 55)
- Foster Children (Scotland) Act 1984 (c. 56)
- Rent (Scotland) Act 1984 (c. 58)
- Representation of the People Act 1983 (c. 2)
- Matrimonial Homes Act 1983 (c. 19)
- Mental Health Act 1983 (c. 20)
- Pilotage Act 1983 (c. 21)
- Litter Act 1983 (c. 35)
- Car Tax Act 1983 (c. 53)
- Medical Act 1983 (c. 54)
- Value Added Tax Act 1983 (c. 55)
- Pastoral Measure 1983 (No. 1)
- Agricultural Training Board Act 1982 (c. 9)
- Industrial Training Act 1982 (c. 10)
- Civil Aviation Act 1982 (c. 16)
- Iron and Steel Act 1982 (c. 25)
- Aviation Security Act 1982 (c. 36)
- Insurance Companies Act 1982 (c. 50)
- Industrial Development Act 1982 (c. 52)
- English Industrial Estates Corporation Act 1981 (c. 13)
- Public Passenger Vehicles Act 1981 (c. 14)
- National Film Finance Corporation Act 1981 (c. 15)
- Film Levy Finance Act 1981 (c. 16)
- Judicial Pensions Act 1981 (c. 20)
- Animal Health Act 1981 (c. 22)
- Betting and Gaming Duties Act 1981 (c. 63)
- New Towns Act 1981 (c. 64)
- Trustee Savings Banks Act 1981 (c. 65)
- Compulsory Purchase (Vesting Declarations) Act 1981 (c. 66)
- Acquisition of Land Act 1981 (c. 67)
- Broadcasting Act 1981 (c. 68)
- Child Care Act 1980 (c. 5)
- Foster Children Act 1980 (c. 6)
- Residential Homes Act 1980 (c. 7)
- Reserve Forces Act 1980 (c. 9)
- Slaughter of Animals (Scotland) Act 1980 (c. 13)
- Magistrates' Courts Act 1980 (c. 43)
- Education (Scotland) Act 1980 (c. 44)
- Water (Scotland) Act 1980 (c. 45)
- Solicitors (Scotland) Act 1980 (c. 46)
- Criminal Appeal (Northern Ireland) Act 1980 (c. 47)
- Limitation Act 1980 (c. 58)
- Overseas Development and Co-operation Act 1980 (c. 63)
- Highways Act 1980 (c. 66)

1970s

- Customs and Excise Management Act 1979 (c. 2)
- Customs and Excise Duties (General Reliefs) Act 1979 (c. 3)
- Alcoholic Liquor Duties Act 1979 (c. 4)
- Hydrocarbon Oil Duties Act 1979 (c. 5)
- Matches and Mechanical Lighters Duties Act 1979 (c 6)
- Tobacco Products Duty Act 1979 (c. 7)
- Excise Duties (Surcharges or Rebates) Act 1979 (c. 8)
- Electricity (Scotland) Act 1979 (c. 11)
- Wages Councils Act 1979 (c. 12)
- Agricultural Statistics Act 1979 (c. 13)
- Capital Gains Tax Act 1979 (c. 14)
- International Monetary Fund Act 1979 (c. 29)
- Exchange Equalisation Account Act 1979 (c. 30)
- Prosecution of Offences Act 1979 (c. 31)
- Sale of Goods Act 1979 (c. 54)
- Justices of the Peace Act 1979 (c. 55)
- Commonwealth Development Corporation Act 1978 (c. 2)
- Refuse Disposal (Amenity) Act 1978 (c. 3)
- Northern Ireland (Emergency Provisions) Act 1978 (c. 5)
- Export Guarantees and Overseas Investment Act 1978 (c. 18)
- Oaths Act 1978 (c. 19)
- Adoption (Scotland) Act 1978 (c. 28)
- National Health Service (Scotland) Act 1978 (c. 29)
- Interpretation Act 1978 (c. 30)
- Employment Protection (Consolidation) Act 1978 (c. 44)
- Agricultural Holdings (Notices to Quit) Act 1977 (c. 12)
- British Airways Board Act 1977 (c. 13)
- Rent Act 1977 (c. 42)
- Protection from Eviction Act 1977 (c. 43)
- National Health Service Act 1977 (c. 49)
- Fatal Accidents Act 1976 (c. 30)
- Legitimacy Act 1976 (c. 31)
- Lotteries and Amusements Act 1976 (c. 32)
- Restrictive Practices Court Act 1976 (c. 33)
- Restrictive Trade Practices Act 1976 (c. 34)
- Police Pensions Act 1976 (c. 35)
- Adoption Act 1976 (c. 36)
- Resale Prices Act 1976 (c. 53)
- Sexual Offences (Scotland) Act 1976 (c. 67)
- Land Drainage Act 1976 (c. 70)
- Supplementary Benefits Act 1976 (c. 71)
- Supply Powers Act 1975 (c. 9)
- Social Security Act 1975 (c. 14)
- Social Security (Northern Ireland) Act 1975 (c. 15)
- Industrial Injuries and Diseases (Old Cases) Act 1975 (c. 16)
- Industrial Injuries and Diseases (Northern Ireland Old Cases) Act 1975 (c. 17)
- Criminal Procedure (Scotland) Act 1975 (c. 21)
- House of Commons Disqualification Act 1975 (c. 24)
- Northern Ireland Assembly Disqualification Act 1975 (c. 25)
- Ministers of the Crown Act 1975 (c. 26)
- Ministerial and other Salaries Act 1975 (c. 27)
- Nursing Homes Act 1975 (c. 37)
- Export Guarantees Act 1975 (c. 38)
- Salmon and Freshwater Fisheries Act 1975 (c. 51)
- Iron and Steel Act 1975 (c. 64)
- Recess Elections Act 1975 (c. 66)
- Airports Authority Act 1975 (c. 78)
- Slaughterhouses Act 1974 (c. 3)
- Legal Aid Act 1974 (c. 4)
- Juries Act 1974 (c. 23)
- Friendly Societies Act 1974 (c. 46)
- Solicitors Act 1974 (c. 47)
- Insurance Companies Act 1974 (c. 49)
- Costs in Criminal Cases Act 1973 (c. 14)
- Matrimonial Causes Act 1973 (c. 18)
- Independent Broadcasting Authority Act 1973 (c. 19)
- Powers of Criminal Courts Act 1973 (c. 62)
- Local Employment Act 1972 (c. 5)
- Summer Time Act 1972 (c. 6)
- Road Traffic Act 1972 (c. 20)
- Betting and Gaming Duties Act 1972 (c. 25)
- Town and Country Planning (Scotland) Act 1972 (c. 52)
- Contracts of Employment Act 1972 (c. 53)
- Land Charges Act 1972 (c. 61)
- National Debt Act 1972 (c. 65)
- Guardianship of Minors Act 1971 (c. 3)
- Vehicles (Excise) Act 1971 (c. 10)
- Hydrocarbon Oil (Customs and Excise) Act 1971 (c. 12)
- Coinage Act 1971 (c. 24)
- Rent (Scotland) Act 1971 (c. 28)
- National Savings Bank Act 1971 (c. 29)
- Attachment of Earnings Act 1971 (c. 32)
- Prevention of Oil Pollution Act 1971 (c. 60)
- Tribunals and Inquiries Act 1971 (c. 62)
- Town and Country Planning Act 1971 (c. 78)
- Taxes Management Act 1970 (c. 9)
- Income and Corporation Taxes Act 1970 (c. 10)
- Sea Fish Industry Act 1970 (c. 11)

1960s

- Customs Duties (Dumping and Subsidies) Act 1969 (c. 16)
- Trustee Savings Banks Act 1969 (c. 50)
- Late Night Refreshment Houses Act 1969 (c. 53)
- Provisional Collection of Taxes Act 1968 (c. 2)
- Capital Allowances Act 1968 (c. 3)
- New Towns (Scotland) Act 1968 (c. 16)
- Criminal Appeal Act 1968 (c. 19)
- Courts-Martial (Appeals) Act 1968 (c. 20)
- Criminal Appeal (Northern Ireland) Act 1968 (c. 21)
- Rent Act 1968 (c. 23)
- Export Guarantees Act 1968 (c. 26)
- Firearms Act 1968 (c. 27)
- Housing (Financial Provisions) (Scotland) Act 1968 (c. 31)
- Plant Health Act 1967 (c. 8)
- General Rate Act 1967 (c. 9)
- Forestry Act 1967 (c. 10)
- Teachers' Superannuation Act 1967 (c. 12)
- Development of Inventions Act 1967 (c. 32)
- Air Corporations Act 1967 (c. 33)
- Industrial Injuries and Diseases (Old Cases) Act 1967 (c. 34)
- Advertisements (Hire-Purchase) Act 1967 (c. 42)
- Legal Aid (Scotland) Act 1967 (c. 43)
- Road Traffic Regulation Act 1967 (c. 76)
- Police (Scotland) Act 1967 (c. 77)
- Sea Fisheries (Shellfish) Act 1967 (c. 83)
- Sea Fish (Conservation) Act 1967 (c. 84)
- Mines (Working Facilities and Support) Act 1966 (c. 4)
- Sea Fisheries Regulation Act 1966 (c. 38)
- Housing (Scotland) Act 1966 (c. 49)
- Industrial and Provident Societies Act 1965 (c. 12)
- Dangerous Drugs Act 1965 (c. 15)
- National Insurance Act 1965 (c. 51)
- National Insurance (Industrial Injuries) Act 1965 (c. 52)
- Family Allowances Act 1965 (c. 53)
- National Health Service Contributions Act 1965 (c. 54)
- Statute Law Revision (Consequential Repeals) Act 1965 (c. 55)
- Compulsory Purchase Act 1965 (c. 56)
- Nuclear Installations Act 1965 (c. 57)
- Ministerial Salaries Consolidation Act 1965 (c. 58)
- New Towns Act 1965 (c. 59)
- Hire-Purchase Act 1965 (c. 66)
- Hire-Purchase (Scotland) Act 1965 (c. 67)
- Matrimonial Causes Act 1965 (c. 72)
- Television Act 1964 (c. 21)
- Licensing Act 1964 (c. 26)

No consolidation acts were passed in 2008, 2004, or 1999.

== See also ==
- Legislation
- United Kingdom legislation
- Destination Tables
- Codification (law)
