= Judicial Pensions Act 1981 =

Act of the Parliament of the United Kingdom

Judicial Pensions Act 1981 (Note: Section 37(1).)
- Act of Parliament
- Parliament of the United Kingdom
- Long title: An Act to consolidate certain enactments relating to pensions and other benefits payable in respect of service in judicial office, with amendments to give effect to recommendations of the Law Commission and the Scottish Law Commission.
- Citation: 1981 c. 20
- Territorial extent: United Kingdom

Dates
- Royal assent: 21 May 1981
- Commencement: 21 June 1981 (Note: Section 37(2).)

Other legislation
- Amends: See § Repealed enactments
- Repeals/revokes: See § Repealed enactments
- Amended by: Senior Courts Act 1981; Transfer of Functions (Social Security Commissioners) Order 1984; Administration of Estates (Small Payments) (Increase of Limit) Order 1984; Judicial Pensions (Personal Pension Option) Regulations 1988; Courts and Legal Services Act 1990; Social Security (Consequential Provisions) Act 1992; Superannuation (Children’s Pensions) (Earnings Limit) Order 1992; Judicial Pensions and Retirement Act 1993; Superannuation (Children’s Pensions) (Earnings Limit) Order 1993; Superannuation (Children’s Pensions) (Earnings Limit) Order 1994; Pensions Act 1995; Employment Tribunals Act 1996; Industrial Tribunals Act 1996; Employment Rights (Dispute Resolution) Act 1998; Human Rights Act 1998; Access to Justice Act 1999; Welfare Reform and Pensions Act 1999; International Criminal Court Act 2001; Constitutional Reform Act 2005; Mental Capacity Act 2005; Civil Partnership (Judicial Pensions and Church Pensions, etc.) Order 2005; Taxation of Judicial Pensions (Consequential Provisions) Order 2006; Transfer of Tribunal Functions Order 2008; Transfer of Tribunal Functions (Lands Tribunal and Miscellaneous Amendments) Order 2009; Crime and Courts Act 2013; Public Service Pensions Act 2013; Pension Schemes Act 2015; Judicial Pensions Regulations 2015; Alteration of Judicial Titles (Registrar in Bankruptcy of the High Court) Order 2018

Status: Amended

Text of statute as originally enacted

Revised text of statute as amended

Text of the Judicial Pensions Act 1981 as in force today (including any amendments) within the United Kingdom, from legislation.gov.uk.

The Judicial Pensions Act 1981 (c. 20) is an act of the Parliament of the United Kingdom that consolidated enactments related to pensions and other benefits payable in respect of service in judicial office.

== Provisions ==
=== Repealed enactments ===
Section 36(2) of the act repealed 32 enactments and 6 instruments, listed in the statutes and statutory instruments sections of schedule 4 to the act.

Statutes
Citation	Short title	Extent of repeal
48 Geo. 3. c. 145	Judges' Pensions (Scotland) Act 1808	The whole act.
17 & 18 Vict. c. 94	Public Revenue and Consolidated Fund Charges Act 1854	In Schedule A the entry beginning "Pensions of the Judges in Scotland" and ending "cap. 145".
14 & 15 Geo. 5. c. 17	County Courts Act 1924	Sections 4(2) and 10 and Schedule 1.
15 & 16 Geo. 5. c. 49	Supreme Court of Judicature (Consolidation) Act 1925	Section 128. In Schedule 3 Part III.
24 & 25 Geo. 5. c. 53	County Courts Act 1934	The whole act.
25 & 26 Geo. 5. c. 23	Superannuation Act 1935	In section 14(1) the proviso, and section 14(2).
12, 13 & 14 Geo. 6. c. 42	Lands Tribunal Act 1949	In section 2(6) the words "and to persons who have been members thereof, such superannuation allowances". In section 2(8) the words "and superannuation allowances of past members".
14 & 15 Geo. 6. c. 2	Superannuation Act 1950	The whole act.
14 & 15 Geo. 6. c. 11	Administration of Justice (Pensions) Act 1950	The whole act.
14 & 15 Geo. 6. c. 46	Courts-Martial (Appeals) Act 1951	Section 34.
15 & 16 Geo. 6 & 1 Eliz. 2. c. 12	Judicial Offices (Salaries, &c) Act 1952	Section 5.
4 & 5 Eliz. 2. c. 46	Administration of Justice Act 1956	Section 12(7). Section 25.
7 & 8 Eliz. 2. c. 22	County Courts Act 1959	In Schedule 2 paragraphs 2 and 4.
7 & 8 Eliz. 2. c. 72	Mental Health Act 1959	In Schedule 7, in Part II, the amendment of Schedule 1 to the Administration of Justice (Pensions) Act 1950.
8 & 9 Eliz. 2. c. 9	Judicial Pensions Act 1959	Section 1. Section 2(2). In section 3(1) the words from "and in default" to the end of the subsection. Section 4. Section 6. Sections 8 to 11. In Schedule 1 all the entries in column 2. Schedule 2.
9 & 10 Eliz. 2. c. 3	Administration of Justice (Judges and Pensions) Act 1960	Sections 3 and 4. Schedule 1.
10 & 11 Eliz. 2. c. 46	Transport Act 1962	In Schedule 10 sub-paragraphs (2) to (5) of paragraph 8.
1965 c. 2	Administration of Justice Act 1965	Section 25.
1965 c. 10	Superannuation (Amendment) Act 1965	Section 5. Schedule 2.
1965 c. 32	Administration of Estates (Small Payments) Act 1965	In section 6(1)(b) the words "section 8 of the Superannuation Act 1887".
1967 c. 28	Superannuation (Miscellaneous Provisions) Act 1967	Section 2(1).
1969 c. 58	Administration of Justice Act 1969	Section 31. In section 36(2) and (3) the figure "31".
1970 c. 31	Administration of Justice Act 1970	In Schedule 2 paragraph 17.
1971 c. 23	Courts Act 1971	In section 19 subsections (1) to (4) and (6) and in subsection (7) paragraphs (b) and (c). In Schedule 8 paragraph 32. In Schedule 10 paragraphs 11 and 12.
1971 c. 56	Pensions (Increase) Act 1971	In Schedule 2 paragraphs 5, 6, 9, 12 and 26.
1972 c. 11	Superannuation Act 1972	Section 23(1). Schedule 5 except as applied by paragraph 1(2)(a) of Schedule 7. In Schedule 6 paragraphs 7, 15 and 28.
1973 c. 15	Administration of Justice Act 1973	Section 2(4). In section 10 subsections (1) to (7) except as applied by subsection (8), and subsection (9). Section 11. Section 13. In section 20 subsection (1)(c), proviso (b) to subsection (5) and subsection (6)(a). In Schedule 1 paragraphs 2 and 11. Schedule 4.
1973 c. 41	Fair Trading Act 1973	In Schedule 12 the amendment of the Pensions (Increase) Act 1971.
1975 c. 14	Social Security Act 1975	In Schedule 10 paragraphs 5 and 6.
1975 c. 18	Social Security (Consequential Provisions) Act 1975	In Schedule 2 paragraph 45.
1976 c. 33	Restrictive Practices Court Act 1976	Section 11(1).
1978 c. 44	Employment Protection (Consolidation) Act 1978	In Schedule 9 paragraph 11.

Statutory instruments
Citation	Title	Extent of repeal
SI 1965/1026	Superannuation (Children's Pensions) (Earnings Limit) Order 1965	The whole order.
SI 1974/983	Pensions Increase (President and Chairmen of Industrial Tribunals) Regulations 1974	The whole instrument.
SI 1974/984	Pensions Increase (Judicial Pensions) (Amendment) Regulations 1974	Regulation 3.
SI 1979/680	Superannuation (Children's Pensions) (Earnings Limit) Order 1979	The whole instrument.
SI 1979/1275	Superannuation (Children's Pensions) (Earnings Limit) (No. 2) Order 1979	The whole instrument.
SI 1980/1610	Superannuation (Children's Pensions) (Earnings Limit) Order 1980	The whole instrument.

== Subsequent developments ==
The act has been amended on numerous occasions since its enactment. The Pensions Act 1995 and the Welfare Reform and Pensions Act 1999 made changes to pension provisions affecting the scheme. The Constitutional Reform Act 2005 restructured the senior judiciary and established the Supreme Court of the United Kingdom, necessitating amendments to the offices covered by the act. The Crime and Courts Act 2013 and Public Service Pensions Act 2013 made further amendments to judicial pension arrangements.
