= Bankruptcy (Scotland) Act 1985 =

Act of the Parliament of the United Kingdom

Bankruptcy (Scotland) Act 1985 (Note: Section 78(1).)
- Act of Parliament
- Parliament of the United Kingdom
- Long title: An Act to reform the law of Scotland relating to sequestration and personal insolvency; and for connected purposes.
- Citation: 1985 c. 66
- Territorial extent: Scotland (Note: Section 78(5)–(6).)

Dates
- Royal assent: 30 October 1985
- Commencement: 30 October 1985 (section 78); 1 February 1986 (in part); 1 April 1986 (in part); 29 December 1986 (in part); (Note: Section 78(2)–(4). The Bankruptcy (Scotland) Act 1985 (Commencement) Order 1985 (SI 1985/1924) as amended by Bankruptcy (Scotland) Act 1985 (Commencement) (Amendment) Order 1986 (SI 1986/78). The Bankruptcy (Scotland) Act 1985 (Commencement No.2) Order 1986 (SI 1986/1913).)
- Repealed: 30 November 2016 (Note: The Bankruptcy (Scotland) Act 2016 (Commencement) Regulations 2016 (SSI 2016/294).)

Other legislation
- Amends: See § Repealed enactments
- Repeals/revokes: See § Repealed enactments
- Amended by: Debtors (Scotland) Act 1987; Finance Act 1994; Value Added Tax Act 1994; Drug Trafficking Act 1994; Jobseekers Act 1995; Criminal Justice (Scotland) Act 1995; Pensions Act 1995; Criminal Procedure (Consequential Provisions) (Scotland) Act 1995; Gas Act 1995; Finance Act 1996; Employment Rights Act 1996; Finance Act 1997; Social Security (Recovery of Benefits) Act 1997; Scotland Act 1998; Welfare Reform and Pensions Act 1999; Scotland Act 1998 (Consequential Modifications) (No.2) Order 1999; Debt Arrangement and Attachment (Scotland) Act 2002; Proceeds of Crime Act 2002; Enterprise Act 2002; Income Tax (Earnings and Pensions) Act 2003; Communications Act 2003; Insolvency (Scotland) Regulations 2003; Companies (Audit, Investigations and Community Enterprise) Act 2004; Civil Partnership Act 2004; Debt Arrangement Scheme (Scotland) Regulations 2004; Consumer Credit Act 2006; Bankruptcy and Diligence etc. (Scotland) Act 2007; Pensions Act 2007; Serious Crime Act 2007; Bankruptcy (Scotland) Act 1985 (Low Income, Low Asset Debtors etc.) Regulations 2008; Bankruptcy (Scotland) Regulations 2008; Policing and Crime Act 2009; Companies Act 2006 (Consequential Amendments, Transitional Provisions and Savings) Order 2009; Home Owner and Debtor Protection (Scotland) Act 2010; Third Parties (Rights against Insurers) Act 2010; Debt Arrangement Scheme (Scotland) Regulations 2011; Pensions Act 2008 (Abolition of Protected Rights) (Consequential Amendments) (No.2) Order 2011; Land Registration etc. (Scotland) Act 2012; Financial Services (Banking Reform) Act 2013; Debt Arrangement Scheme (Scotland) Amendment Regulations 2013; Collective Investment in Transferable Securities (Contractual Scheme) Regulations 2013; Bankruptcy and Debt Advice (Scotland) Act 2014; Bankruptcy (Money Advice and Deduction from Income etc.) (Scotland) Regulations 2014; Banks and Building Societies (Depositor Preference and Priorities) Order 2014; Deposit Guarantee Scheme Regulations 2015; Private Housing (Tenancies) (Scotland) Act 2016; Bankruptcy (Scotland) Act 2016; Bankruptcy and Debt Advice (Scotland) Act 2014 (Consequential Provisions) Order 2016
- Repealed by: Bankruptcy (Scotland) Act 2016

Status: Repealed

Text of statute as originally enacted

Revised text of statute as amended

The Bankruptcy (Scotland) Act 1985 (1985 c. 66) was an act of the Parliament of the United Kingdom that consolidated enactments related to sequestration and personal insolvency in Scotland.

== Provisions ==
=== Repealed enactments ===
Section 75(2) of the act repealed 34 enactments, listed in schedule 8 to the act.

Citation	Short title	Extent of repeal
1621 (c. 18)	Bankruptcy Act 1621	The whole act.
1696 (c. 5)	Bankruptcy Act 1696	The whole act.
31 & 32 Vict. c. 101	Titles to Land Consolidation (Scotland) Act 1868	Section 148.
44 & 45 Vict. c. 21	Married Women's Property (Scotland) Act 1881	Section 1(4).
52 & 53 Vict. c. 39	Judicial Factors (Scotland) Act 1889	In section 5, the words ", and of the Bankruptcy Acts and Cessio Acts," and the words "and accountant in bankruptcy respectively,".
52 & 53 Vict. c. 39	Judicial Factors (Scotland) Act 1889	In section 14, the proviso.
52 & 53 Vict. c. 39	Judicial Factors (Scotland) Act 1889	Sections 15 and 16.
52 & 53 Vict. c. 39	Judicial Factors (Scotland) Act 1889	Section 22.
57 & 58 Vict. c. 60	Merchant Shipping Act 1894	Section 36.
3 & 4 Geo. 5. c. 20	Bankruptcy (Scotland) Act 1913	The whole act.
10 & 11 Geo. 5. c. 64	Married Women's Property (Scotland) Act 1920	In section 5, the proviso.
14 & 15 Geo. 5. c. 27	Conveyancing (Scotland) Act 1924	In section 44, in subsection (4) paragraphs (a) and (b); and in subsection (6) the words "and section 44 of the Bankruptcy (Scotland) Act 1913".
20 & 21 Geo. 5. c. 25	Third Parties (Rights against Insurers) Act 1930	In section 4, paragraph (a).
10 & 11 Geo. 6. c. 47	Companies Act 1947	Sections 91 and 115.
11 & 12 Geo. 6. c. 39	Industrial Assurance and Friendly Societies Act 1948	In section 2(4), the words "where the receiving order or the award of sequestration of his estate was made after the passing of this Act".
15 & 16 Geo. 6 & 1 Eliz. 2. c. 33	Finance Act 1952	In section 30, subsections (4) and (6).
1965 c. 25	Finance Act 1965	In Schedule 10, paragraph 15(1).
1969 c. 48	Post Office Act 1969	In Schedule 4, paragraph 22.
1970 c. 10	Income and Corporation Taxes Act 1970	In Part II of Schedule 15, the entry relating to the Finance Act 1952.
1972 c. 20	Road Traffic Act 1972	In section 150(2), the words "'company' includes a limited partnership, and".
1974 c. 46	Friendly Societies Act 1974	In section 59, in subsection (1)(a) the words "or bankruptcy"; in subsection (2) the words "or trustee in bankruptcy"; and subsections (3) and (4).
1975 c. 14	Social Security Act 1975	In Schedule 18, paragraph 1(1)(b) and (2)(b).
1975 c. 18	Social Security (Consequential Provisions) Act 1975	In Schedule 2, paragraph 1.
1975 c. 45	Finance (No. 2) Act 1975	In section 71(6), the words "section 30 of the Finance Act 1952".
1975 c. 60	Social Security Pensions Act 1975	In Schedule 4, paragraph 1.
1976 c. 24	Development Land Tax Act 1976	In section 42, subsection (1), so far as it relates to bankruptcy in Scotland; and subsection (4)(a).
1976 c. 60	Insolvency Act 1976	In section 5, subsections (3) and (4).
1976 c. 60	Insolvency Act 1976	In Schedule 1, in Part I, the entries relating to the Bankruptcy (Scotland) Act 1913; and, in Part II, paragraphs 1(a), 2(a), 4 and 5(6).
1978 c. 44	Employment Protection (Consolidation) Act 1978	Section 121(1)(b).
1979 c. 37	Banking Act 1979	In section 28(7)(c) the words "where the sequestration is declared at an end by a competent court".
1979 c. 54	Sale of Goods Act 1979	In section 61(4), the words ", and whether he has become a notour bankrupt or not".
1980 c. 55	Law Reform (Miscellaneous Provisions) (Scotland) Act 1980	Section 12.
1981 c. 59	Matrimonial Homes (Family Protection) (Scotland) Act 1981	Section 10.
1981 c. 63	Betting and Gaming Duties Act 1981	In section 30, subsections (1) and (2).
1983 c. 53	Car Tax Act 1983	In Schedule 1, paragraph 4.
1983 c. 55	Value Added Tax Act 1983	In Schedule 7, paragraph 12.
1985 c. 6	Companies Act 1985	In section 665, the words "(whether limited or not)"; and in paragraph (d) the words "registered in England and Wales or Northern Ireland".
1985 c. 17	Reserve Forces (Safeguard of Employment) Act 1985	In section 13, the word "—(a)"; the words from "or, (b)" to "estate,"; the word "—(i)"; and the words from "or, (ii)" to "1913,".

== Subsequent developments ==
The whole act was repealed by section 237(2) of, and part 1 of schedule 9 to, the Bankruptcy (Scotland) Act 2016, which came into force on 30 November 2016.
