= Social Security (Consequential Provisions) (Northern Ireland) Act 1992 =

Act of the Parliament of the United Kingdom

Social Security (Consequential Provisions) (Northern Ireland) Act 1992 (Note: Section 7(1).)
- Act of Parliament
- Parliament of the United Kingdom
- Long title: An Act to make provision for repeals, consequential amendments, transitional and transitory matters and savings in connection with the consolidation of enactments in the Social Security Contributions and Benefits (Northern Ireland) Act 1992 and the Social Security Administration (Northern Ireland) Act 1992 with corrections and minor improvements under the Consolidation of Enactments (Procedure) Act 1949.
- Citation: 1992 c. 9
- Territorial extent: Northern Ireland (Note: Section 7(3).)

Dates
- Royal assent: 13 February 1992
- Commencement: 1 July 1992 (Note: Section 7(2).)

Other legislation
- Amends: See § Repealed enactments
- Repeals/revokes: See § Repealed enactments
- Amended by: Pension Schemes (Northern Ireland) Act 1993; Children (Northern Ireland) Order 1995; Employment Rights (Northern Ireland) Order 1996; Social Security (Recovery of Benefits) (Northern Ireland) Order 1997; Social Security (Northern Ireland) Order 1998; Capital Allowances Act 2001; Income Tax (Earnings and Pensions) Act 2003; Marriage (Northern Ireland) Order 2003; Access to Justice (Northern Ireland) Order 2003; Insolvency (Northern Ireland) Order 2005; Private Tenancies (Northern Ireland) Order 2006
- Relates to: Social Security (Consequential Provisions) Act 1992; Social Security Contributions and Benefits (Northern Ireland) Act 1992; Social Security Administration (Northern Ireland) Act 1992

Status: Amended

Text of statute as originally enacted

Revised text of statute as amended

Text of the Social Security (Consequential Provisions) (Northern Ireland) Act 1992 as in force today (including any amendments) within the United Kingdom, from legislation.gov.uk.

The Social Security (Consequential Provisions) (Northern Ireland) Act 1992 (c. 9) is an act of the Parliament of the United Kingdom that made provision for repeals, consequential amendments, transitional and transitory matters and savings in Northern Ireland in connection with the consolidation of social security enactments by the Social Security Contributions and Benefits (Northern Ireland) Act 1992 and the Social Security Administration (Northern Ireland) Act 1992.

The Social Security (Consequential Provisions) Act 1992 made equivalent provisions for England and Wales and Scotland.

== Provisions ==
=== Repealed enactments ===
Section 3 of the act repealed 46 enactments, listed in schedule 1 to the act.

Citation	Short title	Extent of repeal
1974 c. 4 (N.I.)	National Insurance Measure (Northern Ireland) 1974	Section 5(1), (3) and (4).
1975 c. 15	Social Security (Northern Ireland) Act 1975	The whole act, except sections 97(4) and 158 and paragraphs 5(2), 6, 7 and 7A of Schedule 10.
1975 c. 17	Industrial Injuries and Diseases (Northern Ireland Old Cases) Act 1975	The whole act.
1975 c. 18	Social Security (Consequential Provisions) Act 1975	In Schedule 2, paragraphs 73, 74, 77, 80, 87, 108, 110 and 112. In Schedule 3, in paragraph 31 the words "17, 18, 20".
1975 c. 25	Northern Ireland Assembly Disqualification Act 1975	In Part II of Schedule 1 the entry beginning "A Medical Board".
1975 c. 60	Social Security Pensions Act 1975	In Schedule 4, paragraphs 68 to 70 and 71(a) and (b).
SI 1975/1503 (N.I. 15)	Social Security Pensions (Northern Ireland) Order 1975	In Article 2(3), in sub-paragraph (a) the words "Part II and" and in sub-paragraph (b) the words "(except Article 24)". Part II. Articles 8 to 12. Articles 14 to 18A. Articles 20 to 23. Articles 26 and 27. Article 52A(13). Article 70(1)(a). In Article 70A, the words "8(3)," and "of, and paragraphs 2(3) and 4A of Schedule 1". Article 74(3). Schedule 1. In Schedule 5, paragraphs 17 to 28, 33, 36 to 42 and 44.
SI 1975/1504 (N.I. 16)	Child Benefit (Northern Ireland) Order 1975	The whole order.
SI 1976/427 (N.I. 9)	Social Security and Family Allowances (Northern Ireland) Order 1976	The whole order.
SI 1976/1043 (N.I. 16)	Industrial Relations (Northern Ireland) Order 1976	Article 72(3).
1977 c. 5	Social Security (Miscellaneous Provisions) Act 1977	Section 20(3) and (4).
SI 1977/610 (N.I. 11)	Social Security (Miscellaneous Provisions) (Northern Ireland) Order 1977	Article 1(5). In Article 2(2) the definitions of "the 1966 Act", "the Old Cases Act" and "the principal Act". Article 2(3). Article 3. Article 4(1). Articles 5 to 7. Articles 9 and 10. Articles 13 and 14. Article 16. Article 18(1) to (5), (16), (17) and (25). In Article 19(3), the words from the beginning to "principal Act".
SI 1977/2156 (N.I. 27)	Supplementary Benefits (Northern Ireland) Order 1977	Articles 28 and 29. In Schedule 6, paragraph 19.
1978 c. 23	Judicature (Northern Ireland) Act 1978	In Schedule 5, in Part II, the amendment to the Social Security (Northern Ireland) Act 1975.
1979 c. 18	Social Security Act 1979	Section 9(2).
SI 1979/396 (N.I. 5)	Social Security (Northern Ireland) Order 1979	Article 1(3) and (5). In Article 2(2) the definitions of "the principal Act" and "the Order of 1977". Article 3. Articles 5 and 6. Articles 11 to 13. Article 15. Schedule 1. In Schedule 3, paragraphs 3 to 7, 9 to 11, in paragraph 15 the words "8(3) and" and paragraphs 16, 22, 23 and 28 to 30.
SI 1979/1573 (N.I. 12)	Statutory Rules (Northern Ireland) Order 1979	In Schedule 4, paragraphs 16 and 17.
1980 c. 30	Social Security Act 1980	Section 9(3) and (4). Section 10. Sections 13 and 14. In Schedule 3, Part II.
SI 1980/870 (N.I. 8)	Social Security (Northern Ireland) Order 1980	In Article 2(2) the definitions of "the principal Act" and "the Supplementary Benefits Commission". Article 3. In Article 4, paragraphs (1) and (10). Article 5(2), (5), (6) and (7). Article 6(1). Article 7(2) to (4). Articles 9 and 10. Articles 12 to 14. Article 15(2). Schedule 1. In Schedule 2, Part II. In Schedule 3, paragraph 8.
SI 1980/1087 (N.I. 13)	Social Security (No. 2) (Northern Ireland) Order 1980	The whole order.
SI 1981/230 (N.I. 9)	Social Security (Contributions) (Northern Ireland) Order 1981	The whole order.
SI 1981/1118 (N.I. 25)	Social Security (Northern Ireland) Order 1981	The whole order.
SI 1981/1675 (N.I. 26)	Magistrates' Courts (Northern Ireland) Order 1981	In Schedule 6, paragraphs 34, 35 and 135.
SI 1982/158 (N.I. 4)	Social Security (Contributions) (Northern Ireland) Order 1982	The whole order.
SI 1982/1082 (N.I. 14)	Forfeiture (Northern Ireland) Order 1982	In Article 6(5), the entry relating to the Child Benefit (Northern Ireland) Order 1975.
SI 1982/1084 (N.I. 16)	Social Security (Northern Ireland) Order 1982	Articles 3 to 9. Article 11. Articles 19 and 20. Articles 24, 25 and 25A. Articles 28 to 30. Article 32(1) to (4). Article 35. In Article 36(2) the words "those to which section 156(1) of the principal Act applies and". Schedule 1. In Schedule 2, paragraphs 1 to 4. In Schedule 4, paragraphs 3 to 6, 8, 12, 17, 18, 19 and 21.
SI 1983/1524 (N.I. 17)	Social Security Adjudications (Northern Ireland) Order 1983	The whole order, except Articles 1, 2, 3(3)(a) and 4(3)(a).
SI 1984/1158 (N.I. 8)	Health and Social Security (Northern Ireland) Order 1984	Articles 5 to 8. Articles 10 to 12. Schedules 2 and 3. In Schedule 5, paragraphs 1, 2, 4 and 7 to 9.
SI 1985/1209 (N.I. 16)	Social Security (Northern Ireland) Order 1985	Articles 9 to 15. Article 18. Article 20. Article 23. In Schedule 3, paragraph 1. In Schedule 4, paragraphs 2 and 4 to 7. In Schedule 5, paragraphs 3 to 8 and 31.
1986 c. 50	Social Security Act 1986	In Schedule 9, paragraphs 1, 3(1)(c) and (2)(a) to (g) and (j), 11 and 12.
SI 1986/1888 (N.I. 18)	Social Security (Northern Ireland) Order 1986	In Article 2(2), the definition of "applicable amount", paragraphs (c) and (d) of the definition of "the benefit Acts", the definitions of "dwelling", "housing benefit scheme", "income-related benefit", "long-term benefit", "primary Class 1 contributions", "secondary Class 1 contributions", "qualifying benefit", "rate rebate", "rent rebate", "rent allowance", "rates", "trade dispute", "war disablement pension" and "war widow's pension". Articles 19 to 25B. Articles 27 to 37. Article 38(1). Article 39. Articles 41 to 52. Article 53(3) to (10). Article 54. Article 56. In Article 57, in paragraph (1) the words from "or the Department" to "Executive", in paragraph (2)(a), the words "other than an offence relating to housing benefit", paragraph (2)(b) and the word "and" immediately preceding it, in paragraph (3)(a) the words "or of the Department of the Environment", paragraph (3)(b) and the word "and" immediately preceding it and paragraph (3A). Article 59. Articles 62 to 70. Article 71(1). Articles 74 and 75. Article 79(3) and (4). In Article 80(1), the words "and VI". Article 81(2). Article 81(5) and (6).
SI 1986/1888 (N.I. 18)	Social Security (Northern Ireland) Order 1986	In Article 82, paragraph (1)(c) and (d), paragraph (2), in paragraph (3) the words "and (5)", paragraph (5), in paragraph (6) the words from "and sums" to the end and paragraphs (7) to (10). Schedule 3, except paragraph 17. Schedule 4. In Schedule 5, paragraphs 1 to 17 and in Part II, paragraphs (b) and (c). Schedules 6 and 7. In Schedule 8, paragraphs 1 to 5. In Schedule 9, paragraphs 1, 27(b), 28 to 30, 32, 36(2), 37 to 46, 49 to 51, 53 to 57, 59, 60, 62, 64, 65, 67 to 74 and 76(a).
SI 1987/464 (N.I. 8)	Social Fund (Maternity and Funeral Expenses) (Northern Ireland) Order 1987	The whole order.
1988 c. 1	Income and Corporation Taxes Act 1988	In Schedule 29, paragraph 14 and in paragraph 32, the entries relating to the Social Security (Northern Ireland) Act 1975 and the Social Security (Northern Ireland) Order 1986.
1988 c. 39	Finance Act 1988	In Schedule 3, paragraph 31.
SI 1988/594 (N.I. 2)	Social Security (Northern Ireland) Order 1988	In Article 1(4) the words from "Article 3" to "that Order". Articles 3 to 9. Articles 11 and 12. In Article 15A(2) the words "those to which section 156(1) of the principal Act applies and". Article 16(1). Schedule 1. In Schedule 2, paragraph 1(1). Schedules 3 and 4.
SI 1988/1087 (N.I. 10)	Employment and Training (Amendment) (Northern Ireland) Order 1988	Articles 5 and 6.
SI 1989/1342 (N.I. 13)	Social Security (Northern Ireland) Order 1989	In Article 2(2), the definitions of "the Old Cases Act" and "the 1982 Order". Articles 3 to 5. Article 6(1) to (4). Article 7. Article 8(1). Article 9(1) to (5). Articles 11 to 21. Article 23. Article 24(1) to (6) and (8). Article 28. In Article 29(1) the words "3 to 6" and "11 to 14 and 24". Article 29(2) and (3). In Article 30, paragraph (2), in paragraph (3) the words from "those to" to "applies and" and paragraph (5). In Schedule 1, paragraphs 1 to 10. Schedules 2 and 3. In Schedule 4, paragraphs 1 to 21 and 23. Schedule 7, except paragraph 18. In Schedule 8, paragraphs 1 to 8, 9(1), 10, 11 and 13 to 18.
1990 c. 1	Capital Allowances Act 1990	In Schedule 1, paragraph 2.
1990 c. 27	Social Security Act 1990	Section 17(8) and (9). In Schedule 1, paragraph 5(4).
1990 c. 37	Human Fertilisation and Embryology Act 1990	In Schedule 4, paragraph 3.
SI 1990/1511 (N.I. 15)	Social Security (Northern Ireland) Order 1990	In Article 2(2), the definitions of "the 1982 Order", "the 1986 Order", "the 1989 Order", and "the Old Cases Act". Articles 3 to 7. Article 8(1) to (3). Articles 10 to 12. Articles 18 and 19. In Schedule 1, paragraphs 1 to 5. Schedule 5. In Schedule 6, paragraphs 1, 2(1) and (2), 3 to 5, 6(1) to (5), (7), (8), (10), (16) and in (17) the words from "section 5" to "that section, and" and paragraphs 7 to 15, 16(2), 17 and 19.
SI 1991/194 (N.I. 1)	Health and Personal Social Services (Northern Ireland) Order 1991	In Part II of Schedule 5, the amendments to the Social Security (Northern Ireland) Order 1982 and the Social Security (Northern Ireland) Order 1986.
SI 1991/765 (N.I. 9)	Statutory Sick Pay (Northern Ireland) Order 1991	Articles 3 and 4. Article 5(1)(a) and (b) and (3) to (5).
SI 1991/1712 (N.I. 17)	Disability Living Allowance and Disability Working Allowance (Northern Ireland) Order 1991	Article 3. Article 4(1). Article 5. Article 6(1). Articles 7 and 8. Article 9(1). Articles 10 and 11. Articles 13 and 14. Schedule 1. In Schedule 2, paragraphs 2 to 4, 6 to 9 and 11 to 13. In Schedule 3, Part I.
SI 1991/2294 (N.I. 22)	Social Security (Contributions) (Northern Ireland) Order 1991	The whole order.
1992 c. 6	Social Security (Consequential Provisions) Act 1992	In Schedule 2, paragraphs 12 to 14.
