= Supplementary Benefits Act 1976 =

Act of the Parliament of the United Kingdom

Supplementary Benefits Act 1976 (Note: Section 36(1).)
- Act of Parliament
- Parliament of the United Kingdom
- Long title: An Act to consolidate the Supplementary Benefit Acts 1966 to 1975 and related enactments.
- Citation: 1976 c. 71
- Territorial extent: England and Wales; Scotland; (Note: Section 36(2). Sections 27 (including Schedule 3), 34(1), 34(2), 35 and 36, paragraphs 1 and 5 of Schedule 6, paragraphs 7 to 13 of Schedule 7 and Schedule 8 (in part) also extend to Northern Ireland.)

Dates
- Royal assent: 15 November 1976
- Commencement: 15 November 1976 (Note: Section 36(3).)
Other legislation
Amends	See § Repealed enactments
Repeals/revokes	See § Repealed enactments
Amended by	Domestic Proceedings and Magistrates' Courts Act 1978; Social Security Act 1980; Health And Social Services And Social Security Adjudications Act 1983; Law Reform (Parent and Child) (Scotland) Act 1986; Social Security Act 1986; Income and Corporation Taxes Act 1988; Legal Aid Act 1988; Social Security (Consequential Provisions) Act 1992; Health Authorities Act 1995; Jobseekers Act 1995; Health and Social Care Act 2008

Status: Partially repealed

Text of statute as originally enacted

Revised text of statute as amended

Text of the Supplementary Benefits Act 1976 as in force today (including any amendments) within the United Kingdom, from legislation.gov.uk.

The Supplementary Benefits Act 1976 (c. 71) is an act of the Parliament of the United Kingdom that consolidated enactments relating to supplementary benefit in Great Britain.

== Provisions ==
=== Repealed enactments ===
Section 35(3) of the act repealed 21 enactments, listed in parts I and II of schedule 8 to the act.

Part I — Immediate repeals
Citation	Short title	Extent of repeal
1966 c. 20	Supplementary Benefit Act 1966 (The Ministry of Social Security Act 1966).	The whole act so far as unrepealed.
1969 c. 44	National Insurance Act 1969	In section 8(2), paragraph (f).
1970 c. 42	Local Authority Social Services Act 1970	In Schedule 1, the entry relating to Schedule 4 to the Ministry of Social Security Act 1966.
1970 c. 55	Family Income Supplements Act 1970	Section 13(1).
1971 c. 73	Social Security Act 1971	The whole act so far as unrepealed.
1972 c. 46	Housing (Financial Provisions) (Scotland) Act 1972	In Schedule 9, paragraphs 4 to 6.
1972 c. 47	Housing Finance Act 1972	In Schedule 9, paragraphs 4 to 6.
1972 c. 49	Affiliation Proceedings (Amendment) Act 1972	In section 1, subsection (4)(b). In section 3(3), the words "section 24(8) of the said Act of 1966".
1972 c. 70	Local Government Act 1972	In Schedule 23, paragraph 14.
1973 c. 38	Social Security Act 1973	In section 99, subsection (18). In Schedule 27, paragraph 67.
1973 c. 42	National Insurance and Supplementary Benefit Act 1973	Sections 6 and 7. In section 9, subsections (3) and (6).
1973 c. 42	National Insurance and Supplementary Benefit Act 1973	Schedule 4 so far as unrepealed.
1973 c. 65	Local Government (Scotland) Act 1973	In Schedule 9, paragraph 64. In Schedule 27, paragraph 162.
1974 c. 7	Local Government Act 1974	In section 14, subsection (4).
1974 c. 14	National Insurance Act 1974	In section 8, subsection (5).
1975 c. 11	Social Security Benefits Act 1975	Section 11.
1975 c. 11	Social Security Benefits Act 1975	Schedule 3.
1975 c. 18	Social Security (Consequential Provisions) Act 1975	In Schedule 2, paragraphs 24 to 31.
1975 c. 61	Child Benefit Act 1975	Section 19 and in section 21(5), the words from the beginning of the subsection to the words "under section 16 above; and".
1976 c. 56	Supplementary Benefit (Amendment) Act 1976	The whole act.

Part II — Deferred repeals
Citation	Short title	Extent of repeal
1975 c. 60	Social Security Pensions Act 1975	In Schedule 4, paragraph 9(a).
1975 c. 60	Social Security Pensions Act 1975	In Schedule 4, paragraphs 7 and 8 and paragraph 9(b) and (c).
1975 c. 61	Child Benefit Act 1975	In Schedule 4, paragraphs 1, 2 and 7.
1975 c. 71	Employment Protection Act 1975	In section 111, subsection (2).

== Subsequent developments ==
Sections 1 to 21, sections 24 to 27, and other provisions of the act were repealed by section 86(2) of, and schedule 11 to, the Social Security Act 1986, which came into force on 11 April 1988. (Note: The Social Security Act 1986 (Commencement No. 8) Order 1987 (SI 1987/1853).) Section 30 was later repealed by section 30(4) of, and schedule 3 to, the Jobseekers Act 1995, which came into force on 1 April 1996. (Note: The Jobseekers Act 1995 (Commencement No. 1) Order 1995 (SI 1995/3228).)
