= Social Security (Consequential Provisions) Act 1975 =

Act of the Parliament of the United Kingdom

Social Security (Consequential Provisions) Act 1975 (Note: Section 6.)
- Act of Parliament
- Parliament of the United Kingdom
- Long title: An Act to make provision consequential on, and in connection with, the Social Security Act 1975, the Industrial Injuries and Diseases (Old Cases) Act 1975, the Social Security (Northern Ireland) Act 1975 and the Industrial Injuries and Diseases (Northern Ireland Old Cases) Act 1975.
- Citation: 1975 c. 18
- Territorial extent: United Kingdom (Note: Section 5.)

Dates
- Royal assent: 20 March 1975
- Commencement: 6 April 1975 (Note: Section 3(2).)
Other legislation
Amends	See § Repealed enactments
Repeals/revokes	See § Repealed enactments
Amended by	Social Security Pensions Act 1975; House of Commons Disqualification Act 1975; Northern Ireland Assembly Disqualification Act 1975; Supplementary Benefits Act 1976; Rent Act 1977; Child Care Act 1980; Agricultural Training Board Act 1982; Industrial Training Act 1982; Public Health (Control of Disease) Act 1984; Companies Consolidation (Consequential Provisions) Act 1985; Bankruptcy (Scotland) Act 1985; Income and Corporation Taxes Act 1988; Statute Law (Repeals) Act 1989; Social Security (Consequential Provisions) Act 1992; Social Security (Consequential Provisions) (Northern Ireland) Act 1992; Tribunals and Inquiries Act 1992; Pension Schemes Act 1993; Pension Schemes (Northern Ireland) Act 1993
Relates to	Social Security Act 1975; Industrial Injuries and Diseases (Old Cases) Act 1975; Social Security (Northern Ireland) Act 1975; Industrial Injuries and Diseases (Northern Ireland Old Cases) Act 1975

Status: Partially repealed

Text of statute as originally enacted

Revised text of statute as amended

Text of the Social Security (Consequential Provisions) Act 1975 as in force today (including any amendments) within the United Kingdom, from legislation.gov.uk.

The Social Security (Consequential Provisions) Act 1975 (c. 18) is an act of the Parliament of the United Kingdom that made provision consequential on, and in connection with, the consolidation of social security enactments in the Social Security Act 1975, the Industrial Injuries and Diseases (Old Cases) Act 1975, the Social Security (Northern Ireland) Act 1975 and the Industrial Injuries and Diseases (Northern Ireland Old Cases) Act 1975.

== Provisions ==
=== Repealed enactments ===
Section 1(2) of the act repealed 59 enactments, listed in parts I and II of schedule 1 to the act.

Part I – Enactments of the Parliament of the United Kingdom
Citation	Short title	Extent of repeal
9 & 10 Geo. 6. c. 62	National Insurance (Industrial Injuries) Act 1946	The whole act, so far as unrepealed.
10 & 11 Geo. 6. c. 41	Fire Services Act 1947	In section 26(2), the words "national insurance and".
11 & 12 Geo. 6. c. 39	Industrial Assurance and Friendly Societies Act 1948	In section 7, the words "national insurance and".
14 & 15 Geo. 6. c. 27	Fire Services Act 1951	In section 2(4), the words "national insurance and".
4 & 5 Eliz. 2. c. 19	Friendly Societies Act 1955	In section 9(1), the words "national insurance and".
7 & 8 Eliz. 2. c. 65	Fatal Accidents Act 1959	In section 2(2), the words "national insurance and".
7 & 8 Eliz. 2. c. 69	Wages Councils Act 1959	In section 14(1)(a), the words "national insurance and".
10 & 11 Eliz. 2. c. 12	Education Act 1962	In section 9, in the proviso to subsection (5), the words "national insurance and".
1964 c. 81	Diplomatic Privileges Act 1964	In section 2(4), the words "national insurance and".
1965 c. 51	National Insurance Act 1965	The whole act.
1965 c. 52	National Insurance (Industrial Injuries) Act 1965	The whole act.
1965 c. 53	Family Allowances Act 1965	In section 19(1), the definitions of "the Insurance Act" and "the Social Security Act".
1966 c. 6	National Insurance Act 1966	The whole act, except section 13(2).
1966 c. 10	Commonwealth Secretariat Act 1966	In the Schedule, in paragraph 5(2), the words "national insurance and".
1966 c. 20	Ministry of Social Security Act 1966	In Schedule 2, in paragraph 11, sub-paragraph (3).
1967 c. 25	National Insurance (Industrial Injuries) (Amendment) Act 1967	The whole act.
1967 c. 28	Superannuation (Miscellaneous Provisions) Act 1967	In section 13(2), the words "national insurance and".
1967 c. 34	Industrial Injuries and Diseases (Old Cases) Act 1967	The whole act.
1967 c. 73	National Insurance Act 1967	The whole act.
1967 c. 90	Family Allowances and National Insurance Act 1967	In section 1, subsection (4). In section 2, subsection (3). In section 4, in subsection (1), paragraph (b); and in subsection (2), paragraphs (b) and (c). Schedule 2. In Schedule 3, paragraphs 1, 3, 5(2), 6 and 7.
1968 c. 18	Consular Relations Act 1968	In section 1(6), the words "national insurance and".
1968 c. 40	Family Allowances and National Insurance Act 1968	The whole act.
1968 c. 48	International Organisations Act 1968	In Schedule 1, in paragraph 13, the words "national insurance and".
1969 c. 44	National Insurance Act 1969	Section 7. In section 8(2), paragraphs (b) and (g). In section 11, in subsection (1), all after the first "1969"; subsection (2); and in subsection (3) the words from the beginning to "the paragraph". Schedule 6.
1971 c. 50	National Insurance Act 1971	The whole act.
1971 c. 73	Social Security Act 1971	Section 4. Section 4A. Section 6. Section 7(2). In section 11, paragraphs (a) and (b) of subsection (1), and subsections (4) and (5); in subsection (7), all the words preceding "this Act", and the words "except section 10 thereof".
1972 c. 57	National Insurance Act 1972	The whole act.
1972 c. 80	Pensioners' Payments and National Insurance Contributions Act 1972	Section 2. In section 3(3), the words from "and section 2" onwards.
1973 c. 15	Administration of Justice Act 1973	In Schedule 1, in paragraph 8(1), the words "national insurance and".
1973 c. 38	Social Security Act 1973	In section 1, subsections (1) to (6) and (10). Sections 2 to 22. In section 23, subsections (2) to (6). Sections 24 to 50. Section 84. Section 87. In section 88, in subsection (1), the words "and the Industrial Injuries Acts" and the words from "(being" to "that section)"; in subsection (2), the words from "(being" to "1971)" and from "and, to the extent" to the end of the subsection. In section 89(3)(e), the words "or Part III of the Industrial Injuries Act". Section 90. In section 92, in subsection (2), paragraphs (a) and (b) and the words "benefit or other" in paragraph (c); in subsection (4) the words from "(being" to "1966)" and from "and so much" onwards; in subsection (5) the words "or the Industrial Injuries Act", "the National Insurance Fund", "section 84(1)(a) to (c) or", "(1A)(a) or", "and section 65" of, "the former principal Act or"; and subsection (8). In section 93, in subsection (2), paragraph (a); and subsection (3). Section 94. In section 95, in subsection (2) the words "84(1) to (5) and", "94(1) to (8), (10) and (11)"; in subsection (3) the words "84(6), 87", "94(9)" and "Schedule 21 and". In section 96, in subsection (2) the words "an Order in Council" and "Orders in Council"; in subsection (3), the words "an Order in Council", "Her Majesty or", "as the case may be" and "Order in Council"; in subsection (4), the words "an Order in Council or", "Order in Council or" and "Order in Council or, as the case may be"; subsection (5); in subsection (6) the words from "(other than" to "Act or of the Industrial Injuries Acts"; and subsections (7) and (8). In section 97, subsections (1) and (2); and in subsection (4) the words "48(3) or". In section 98(1), the words "Without prejudice to section 46(2) of this Act". In section 99, in subsection (1) the definitions of "basic scheme", "basic scheme contributions", "basic scheme benefits" and similar expressions, "benefit year", "confinement", "current", "family allowance", "the Family Allowances Act", "the former principal Act", "incapable of work", "the Industrial Injuries Act", "Industrial Injuries Acts", "the Joint Authority", "the Old Cases Act", "Old Cases Acts", "week", "year", and the definitions added to subsection (1) by Schedule 1 to the Social Security Amendment Act 1974; in subsection (3), the words following "State"; subsections (8) and (9), (11) and (12); and in subsection (17), the words "48" and "an Order in Council" (twice). Section 100(1). Schedules 1 to 14. Schedule 21. In Schedule 22, the words inserted at the end of paragraph 1(b) by the Social Security Amendment Act 1974, Schedule 1; in paragraph 2(1) the words from "or (b) whether" onwards; and paragraph 12. In Schedule 23, paragraph 8; in paragraph 9, in sub-paragraph (1) the words "or 8(a)", in sub-paragraph (3), all the words preceding "evidence", sub-paragraph (4) and in sub-paragraph (5) the words "or (4)"; in paragraphs 10(1) and 11(1), the words "or 8(a)"; in paragraph 14, sub-paragraph (2) and in sub-paragraph (4) the words "(2) and" and "(a) primary Class 1 or Class 2 contributions; or"; and paragraph 15. In Schedule 25, paragraphs 3 to 7; in paragraph 10(f), in the paragraph substituted for Schedule 23 paragraph 11, the words "or 8(a)"; paragraphs 11 to 13, and 15(1), (2); in paragraph 15(3), the words "regulations and", the words from "other than" to "1966" and the words "and, in the case of those made under this Act"; in paragraph 15(3A) (inserted by Schedule 1 to the Social Security Amendment Act 1974) the words "or the Department of Manpower Services for Northern Ireland" and "regulations or"; and Parts III and IV. Schedule 26. In Schedule 27, paragraphs 1 to 5, 8, 11, 13, 23, 25 to 47, 49 to 52, 60 to 63, 65, 66, 68 to 71, 73 to 77, 79, 81 to 84, 86, 87, 89 to 95, 99, 102, 105, 106, 108, 113 to 116, 122, 124, 125, 127, 129 to 162, 164 to 166, 168 to 174 and 176.
1973 c. 42	National Insurance and Supplementary Benefit Act 1973	Sections 1 and 3 to 5. In section 8(1), the words from "but" to the end. In section 9, subsection (2); in each of subsections (3) and (4), paragraphs (a) to (c); and subsection (5). In Schedule 5, every entry in the Table in paragraph 2(1) except the entries for the Ministry of Social Security Act 1966 and the Supplementary Benefit (Determination of Requirements) Regulations 1972; paragraphs 2(2) and (3), and 3 to 6. Schedules 6 and 7.
1973 c. 61	Pensioners' Payments and National Insurance Act 1973	Sections 5, 6 and 8. In the Schedule, the first six entries (that is to say, down to but excluding the Social Security Act 1973).
1974 c. 14	National Insurance Act 1974	Sections 1 to 4. Section 6(2). Section 7. In section 8, subsections (2) to (4) and, in subsection (6), the words "(except Part I of that Act)" and "except subsections (2) and (3)", paragraph (c), and the words from "but excluding" onwards. Schedule 2. In Schedule 4, paragraphs 1 to 32; in paragraph 36, sub-paragraphs (a) and (c); and paragraphs 37 and 39 to 56. Schedules 5 and 6.
1974 c. 23	Juries Act 1974	In section 19, in subsection (1)(b) the words "national insurance and"; and subsection (7).
1974 c. 58	Social Security Amendment Act 1974	The whole act.
1975 c. 11	Social Security Benefits Act 1975	Sections 1 to 7. Section 8, except subsection (6). Section 9(2). Section 10. Section 12(2). Section 14(3). Schedules 1 and 2. In Schedule 4, in paragraph 1, the words "2" (twice) and "10"; in paragraph 2, in the Table, the entries (in both columns) from that beginning "Section 81 of that Act" to that beginning "The Industrial Injuries and Diseases (Old Cases) Act 1967" and the entry beginning "the Consolidated Fund"; and paragraph 3. In Schedule 5, paragraphs 1 to 4.

Part II – Enactments of the Parliament of Northern Ireland or the Northern Ireland Assembly; Orders in Council applying to Northern Ireland
Citation	Short title	Extent of repeal
1945 c. 21 (N.I.)	Wages Councils Act (Northern Ireland) 1945	In section 13(1)(a), the words "national insurance and".
1946 c. 21 (N.I.)	National Insurance (Industrial Injuries) Act (Northern Ireland) 1946	The whole act.
1948 c. 22 (N.I.)	Industrial Assurance and Friendly Societies Act (Northern Ireland) 1948	In section 7(1), the words "national insurance and".
1955 c. 29 (N.I.)	Registration of Births, Deaths and Marriages (Fees, etc.) Act (Northern Ireland) 1955	In Schedule 2, the entry relating to the National Insurance (Industrial Injuries) Act (Northern Ireland) 1946.
1959 c. 18 (N.I.)	Fatal Accidents Act (Northern Ireland) 1959	In section 2(2), the words "national insurance and".
1966 c. 6 (N.I.)	National Insurance Act (Northern Ireland) 1966	The whole act.
1966 c. 8 (N.I.)	Family Allowances Act (Northern Ireland) 1966	In section 18, the definitions of "the Insurance Act" and "the Social Security Act".
1966 c. 9 (N.I.)	National Insurance (Industrial Injuries) Act (Northern Ireland) 1966	The whole act.
1966 c. 14 (N.I.)	Workmen's Compensation (Supplementation) Act (Northern Ireland) 1966	The whole act.
1966 c. 16 (N.I.)	National Insurance (No. 2) Act (Northern Ireland) 1966	The whole act.
1966 c. 28 (N.I.)	Supplementary Benefits &c. Act (Northern Ireland) 1966	In Schedule 2, in paragraph 11 (formerly paragraph 10A), sub-paragraph (3).
1967 c. 22 (N.I.)	National Insurance Act (Northern Ireland) 1967	The whole act.
1967 c. 25 (N.I.)	Births and Deaths Registration Act (Northern Ireland) 1967	In Schedule 2, the entry relating to the National Insurance (Industrial Injuries) Act (Northern Ireland) 1966.
1968 c. 1 (N.I.)	Family Allowances and National Insurance Act (Northern Ireland) 1968	Sections 1(4) and 2(2). In section 4, in subsections (1), (2) and (3) (in each case) paragraphs (b) and (c). Schedule 2, Part II. In Schedule 3, paragraphs 1, 3, 5(2) and 6.
1968 c. 16 (N.I.)	Family Allowances and National Insurance (No. 2) Act (Northern Ireland) 1968	The whole act.
1969 c. 19 (N.I.)	National Insurance &c. (No. 2) Act (Northern Ireland) 1969	Section 7. In section 8(2), paragraphs (e) and (f). In section 11, in subsection (1), all after the first "1969"; in subsection (2) the definitions of "the Insurance Act", "the Industrial Injuries Act" and "the Workmen's Compensation (Supplementation) Act"; and subsection (3). Schedule 6.
1969 c. 30 (N.I.)	Judgments (Enforcement) Act (Northern Ireland) 1969	In Schedule 4, the entry relating to the National Insurance (Industrial Injuries) Act (Northern Ireland) 1966.
1970 c. 31 (N.I.)	Friendly Societies Act (Northern Ireland) 1970	In section 102(1), the words "national insurance and".
1971 c. 21 (N.I.)	Social Services (Parity) Act (Northern Ireland) 1971	In Schedule 1, the entries for the National Insurance Acts 1965 to 1970, the National Insurance (Industrial Injuries) Acts 1965 to 1969, the National Health Service Contributions Act 1965 and the Industrial Injuries and Diseases (Old Cases) Acts 1967 and 1969.
SR&O 1971/224	Social Services (Parity) Order (Northern Ireland) 1971	The whole order.
1971 c. 28 (N.I.)	Social Security Act (Northern Ireland) 1971	Section 4. Section 4A. Section 6. Section 7(2). In section 9, in subsection (1) paragraphs (a) and (b), subsections (3) and (4) and in subsection (5) the definitions of "the Insurance Act" and "the Industrial Injuries Act".
SI 1972/1263	Education and Libraries (Northern Ireland) Order 1972	In Article 36(5), the words "national insurance".
1974 c. 4 (N.I.)	National Insurance Measure (Northern Ireland) 1974	Sections 1 to 4. In section 3, subsection (2) and in subsection (3) the words "or (2)". Section 6(2) to (5). Schedule 2. In Schedule 4, in paragraph 1 sub-paragraph (a) and paragraph 2. Schedules 5 and 6.
