= Recess Elections Act 1975 =

Act of the Parliament of the United Kingdom

Recess Elections Act 1975 (Note: Section 5(1).)
- Act of Parliament
- Parliament of the United Kingdom
- Long title: An Act to consolidate the enactments relating to the issue of warrants for by-elections when the House of Commons is in recess, and to repeal, as unnecessary, section 106(2) of the Bankruptcy Act 1914.
- Citation: 1975 c. 66
- Territorial extent: United Kingdom (Note: Section 5(8).)

Dates
- Royal assent: 12 November 1975
- Commencement: 12 December 1975 (Note: Section 5(7).)
Other legislation
Amends	See § Repealed enactments
Repeals/revokes	See § Repealed enactments
Amended by	Insolvency Act 1985; Insolvency Act 1986; Statute Law (Repeals) Act 1993; House of Lords Act 1999

Status: Partially repealed

Text of statute as originally enacted

Revised text of statute as amended

Text of the Recess Elections Act 1975 as in force today (including any amendments) within the United Kingdom, from legislation.gov.uk.

The Recess Elections Act 1975 (c. 66) is an act of the Parliament of the United Kingdom that consolidated enactments relating to the issue of warrants for by-elections when the House of Commons is in recess.

== Provisions ==
=== Repealed enactments ===
Section 5(4) of the act repealed 5 enactments, listed in schedule 2 to the act.

Citation	Short title	Extent of repeal
24 Geo. 3. Sess. 2. c. 26	Recess Elections Act 1784	The whole act.
21 & 22 Vict. c. 110	Election of Members during Recess Act 1858	The whole act.
26 & 27 Vict. c. 20	Election in the Recess Act 1863	The whole act.
35 & 36 Vict. c. 58	Bankruptcy (Ireland) Amendment Act 1872	Sections 43 and 44.
46 & 47 Vict. c. 52	Bankruptcy Act 1883	Sections 33(2) and (3).
