= List of statutory instruments of the United Kingdom, 1982 =

This is an incomplete list of statutory instruments of the United Kingdom in 1982.

== Statutory instruments ==
=== 1-499 ===
==== 1–100 ====
- Children Act 1975 (Scotland) (Commencement No. 3) Order 1982 (SI 1982/33)
- Vale of Glamorgan (Communities) Order 1982 (SI 1982/98)

== 101–200 ==
- Education (Teachers) Regulations 1982 (SI 1982/106)
- Act of Adjournal (Criminal Legal Aid Fees Amendment) 1982 (SI 1982/121)
- Supreme Court Funds (Amendment) Rules 1982 (SI 1982/123)
- Cardiff (Communities) Order 1982 (SI 1982/127)
- Belvoir, Bottlesford and Redmile (Areas) Order 1982 (SI 1982/128)
- Calshot Oyster Fishery Order 1982 (SI 1982/135)
- Lincoln and North Kesteven (Areas) Order 1982 (SI 1982/141)
- Extradition (Internationally Protected Persons) (Amendment) Order 1982 (SI 1982/147)
- Rates Amendment (Northern Ireland) Order 1982 (SI 1982/156) (N.I. 2)
- Yeovil (Parishes) Order 1982 (SI 1982/185)
- Allerdale (Parishes) Order 1982 (SI 1982/195)
- Charnwood (Parishes) Order 1982 (SI 1982/196)
- Huntingdon (Parishes) Order 1982 (SI 1982/197)

== 201–300 ==
- Poisons Rules 1982 (SI 1982/218)
- Islwyn (Communities) Order 1982 (SI 1982/233)
- National Health Service Functions (Directions to Authorities and Administration Arrangements) Regulations 1982 (SI 1982/287)
- National Health Service (Charges for Drugs and Appliances) Amendment Regulations 1982 (SI 1982/289)

== 301–400 ==
- Authorities for London Post-Graduate Teaching Hospitals Regulations 1982 (SI 1982/315)
- Anguilla Constitution Order 1982 (SI 1982/334)
- Departments (Northern Ireland) Order 1982 (SI 1982/338) (N.I. 6)
- Limitation Amendment (Northern Ireland) Order 1982 (SI 1982/339) (N.I. 7)
- Rhuddlan (Communities) Order 1982 (SI 1982/376)
- Woodspring (Parishes) Order 1982 (SI 1982/392)

== 401–500 ==
- St. Clears-Nash (South Pembrokeshire) Trunk Road (Nash Finger Post—Waterloo Roundabout Trunking) Order 1982 (SI 1982/437)
- Sefton (Parishes) (Amendment) Order 1982 (SI 1982/440)
- Act of Adjournal (Criminal Legal Aid Fees Amendment No. 2) 1982 (SI 1982/468)
- State Scheme Premiums (Actuarial Tables) Amendment Regulations 1982 (SI 1982/492)
- Social Security (Class 1 Contributions—Contracted-out Percentages) Order 1982 (SI 1982/493)

== 501–600 ==
- Wells and Walsingham Railway Light Railway Order 1982 (SI 1982/521)
- County of East Sussex (Electoral Arrangements) Order 1982 (SI 1982/535)
- City of Cardiff (Electoral Arrangements) Order 1982 (SI 1982/556)
- Borough of Rhuddlan (Electoral Arrangements) Order 1982 (SI 1982/590)

== 601–700 ==
- Borough of Vale of Glamorgan (Electoral Arrangements) Order 1982 (SI 1982/606)
- Lothian Region (Electoral Arrangements) (Amendment) Order 1982 (SI 1982/625)
- Petroleum-spirit (Plastic Containers) Regulations 1982 (SI 1982/630)

== 701–800 ==
- Land Compensation (Northern Ireland) Order 1982 (SI 1982/712) (N.I. 9)
- Probation Board (Northern Ireland) Order 1982 (SI 1982/713) (N.I. 10)
- Patents Rules 1982 (SI 1982/717)
- County Court Funds (Amendment No. 2) Rules 1982 (SI 1982/786)
- Supreme Court Funds (Amendment No. 2) Rules 1982 (SI 1982/787)
- Outward Processing Relief (Amendment) Regulations 1982 (SI 1982/793)

== 801–900 ==
- Measuring Instruments (EEC Initial Verification Requirements) (Fees) Regulations 1982 (SI 1982/811)
- Merchant Shipping (Tonnage) Regulations 1982 (SI 1982/841)
- Seeds (National Lists of Varieties) Regulations 1982 (SI 1982/844)
- Departments (No. 2) (Northern Ireland) Order 1982 (SI 1982/846) (N.I. 11)
- National Health Service (Charges to Overseas Visitors) (No. 2) Regulations 1982 (SI 1982/863)
- Merchant Shipping (Safety Officials and Reporting of Accidents and Dangerous Occurrences) Regulations 1982 (SI 1982/876)
- Statutory Sick Pay (General) Regulations 1982 (SI 1982/894)
- National Health Service (Charges to Overseas Visitors) (Scotland) Regulations 1982 (SI 1982/898)

== 901–1000 ==
- Industrial Training (Plastics Processing Board) Order 1982 (SI 1982/923)
- Swansea—Manchester Trunk Road (Newbridge, Ruabon and Johnstown By-pass and Slip Roads) Order 1982 (SI 1982/941)

== 1001–1100 ==
- British Citizenship (Designated Service) Order 1982 (SI 1982/1004)
- Local Government (Compensation for Premature Retirement) Regulations 1982 (SI 1982/1009)
- Agricultural Marketing (Northern Ireland) Order 1982 (SI 1982/1080) (N.I. 12)
- Forfeiture (Northern Ireland) Order 1982 (SI 1982/1082) (N.I. 14)
- Industrial Development (Northern Ireland) Order 1982 (SI 1982/1083) (N.I. 15)
- Social Security (Northern Ireland) Order 1982 (SI 1982/1084) (N.I. 16)

== 1101–1200 ==
- Motor Vehicles (Competitions and Trials) (Amendment) Regulations 1982 (SI 1982/1103)
- Crown Court Rules 1982 (SI 1982/1109)
- Police Pensions (Amendment) Regulations 1982 (SI 1982/1151)
- Third Country Fishing (Enforcement) Order 1982 (SI 1982/1161)
- Pensions Increase (Review) Order 1982 (SI 1982/1178)
- Road Traffic Accidents (Payments for Treatment) (England and Wales) Order 1982 (SI 1982/1194)
- Legal Aid in Criminal Proceedings (Costs) Regulations 1982 (SI 1982/1197)

== 1201–1300 ==
- Motor Vehicles (Wearing of Seat Belts) Regulations 1982 (SI 1982/1203)
- North East of Birmingham—Nottingham Trunk Road—The Birmingham—Nottingham Route (Appleby Magna to Kegworth Section and Slip Roads) No. 1 Order 1982 (SI 1982/1225)
- Breckland (Parishes) Order 1982 (SI 1982/1235)
- Social Security (Claims and Payments) Amendment Regulations 1982 (SI 1982/1241)
- Road Traffic Accidents (Payments for Treatment) (Scotland) Order 1982 (SI 1982/1252)
- Erewash (Parishes) Order 1982 (SI 1982/1256)
- County of West Midlands (Electoral Arrangements) Order 1982 (SI 1982/1260)

== 1301–1400 ==
- Notification of Installations Handling Hazardous Substances Regulations 1982 (SI 1982/1357)
- Thamesdown (Parishes) Order 1982 (SI 1982/1369)
- District of Dwyfor (Electoral Arrangements) Order 1982 (SI 1982/1395)
- Statutory Sick Pay (Adjudication) Regulations 1982 (SI 1982/1400)

== 1401–1500 ==
- Burnley (Parishes) Order 1982 (SI 1982/1405)
- Social Security (General Benefit) Regulations 1982 (SI 1982/1408)
- Meters (Periods of Certification) Order 1982 (SI 1982/1442)
- Central and Strathclyde Regions (Croftamie) Boundaries Order 1982 (SI 1982/1472) (S. 167)
- Workmen's Compensation (Supplementation) Scheme 1982 (SI 1982/1489)

== 1501–1600 ==
- Disabled Persons (Northern Ireland) Order 1982 (SI 1982/1535) (N.I. 18)
- Homosexual Offences (Northern Ireland) Order 1982 (SI 1982/1536) (N.I. 19)
- Planning (Amendment) (Northern Ireland) Order 1982 (SI 1982/1537) (N.I. 20)
- Taking of Hostages Act 1982 (Overseas Territories) Order 1982 (SI 1982/1540)
- Kingswood (Parishes) Order 1982 (SI 1982/1599)

== 1601–1700 ==
- Sedgemoor (Bridgwater Without) Order 1982 (SI 1982/1618)
- Launceston Light Railway Order 1982 (SI 1982/1621)
- Crawley, Horsham and Mid Sussex (Areas) Order 1982 (SI 1982/1636)
- Cleveland and Durham (Areas) Order 1982 (SI 1982/1658)
- Wireless Telegraphy (Exemption) Regulations 1982 (SI 1982/1697)

== 1701–1800 ==
- Newcastle and Gateshead Water (Consolidation etc.) Order 1982 (SI 1982/1718)
- Kempston and Kempston Rural (Areas) Order 1982 (SI 1982/1746)
- Glanford (Parishes) Order 1982 (SI 1982/1747)
- Betchworth (Areas) Order 1982 (SI 1982/1748)
- Neath (Communities) Order 1982 (SI 1982/1751)
- Merchant Shipping (Section 52 Inquiries) Rules 1982 (SI 1982/1752)
- Macclesfield and Vale Royal (Areas) Order 1982 (SI 1982/1759)
- Radnor (Communities) Order 1982 (SI 1982/1776)

== 1801–1900 ==
- North Yorkshire and West Yorkshire (Areas) Order 1982 (SI 1982/1813)
- Gillingham and Swale (Areas) Order 1982 (SI 1982/1814)
- Swale (Parishes) Order 1982 (SI 1982/1864)
- West Lancashire (Parishes) Order 1982 (SI 1982/1865)
- Legal Aid (Scotland) (Exclusion of Proceedings) Regulations 1982 (SI 1982/1877)
- Welfare of Livestock (Prohibited Operations) Regulations 1982 (SI 1982/1884)

== See also ==
- List of statutory instruments of the United Kingdom
