= Social Security (Consequential Provisions) Act 1992 =

Act of the Parliament of the United Kingdom

Social Security (Consequential Provisions) Act 1992 (Note: Section 7(1).)
- Act of Parliament
- Parliament of the United Kingdom
- Long title: An Act to make provision for repeals, consequential amendments, transitional and transitory matters and savings in connection with the consolidation of enactments in the Social Security Contributions and Benefits Act 1992 and the Social Security Administration Act 1992 (including provisions to give effect to recommendations of the Law Commission and the Scottish Law Commission).
- Citation: 1992 c. 6
- Territorial extent: England and Wales; Scotland; (Note: Section 7(7). Sections 2 and 7 also extend to Northern Ireland, by virtue of section 7(3). By virtue of section 7(4), where any enactment repealed or amended by the act extended to any part of the United Kingdom, the repeal or amendment also extended to that part. Section 4 also extends to the Isle of Man in so far as it relates to paragraphs 53 and 54 of schedule 2 to the act, by virtue of section 7(8).)

Dates
- Royal assent: 13 February 1992
- Commencement: 1 July 1992 (Note: Section 7(2).)

Other legislation
- Amends: See § Consequential amendments
- Repeals/revokes: See § Repealed enactments
- Amended by: Taxation of Chargeable Gains Act 1992; Police and Magistrates' Courts Act 1994; Employment Tribunals Act 1996; Employment Rights Act 1996; Housing Act 1996; Social Security Act 1998; Access to Justice Act 1999; Child Support, Pensions and Social Security Act 2000; Capital Allowances Act 2001; Enterprise Act 2002; Income Tax (Earnings and Pensions) Act 2003; Transfer of Tribunal Functions Order 2008; Welfare Reform Act 2009; Welfare Reform Act 2012; Crime and Courts Act 2013; Enterprise and Regulatory Reform Act 2013; Bankruptcy (Scotland) Act 2016 (Consequential Provisions and Modifications) Order 2016
- Relates to: Social Security Contributions and Benefits Act 1992; Social Security Administration Act 1992; Social Security (Consequential Provisions) (Northern Ireland) Act 1992

Status: Partially repealed

Text of statute as originally enacted

Revised text of statute as amended

Text of the Social Security (Consequential Provisions) Act 1992 as in force today (including any amendments) within the United Kingdom, from legislation.gov.uk.

The Social Security (Consequential Provisions) Act 1992 (c. 6) is an act of the Parliament of the United Kingdom that made provision for repeals, consequential amendments, transitional and transitory matters and savings in connection with the consolidation of enactments in the Social Security Contributions and Benefits Act 1992 and the Social Security Administration Act 1992.

The Social Security (Consequential Provisions) (Northern Ireland) Act 1992 made equivalent provisions for Northern Ireland.

== Provisions ==
=== Repealed enactments ===
Section 3 of the act repealed 50 enactments, listed in schedule 1 to the act.

Citation	Short title	Extent of repeal
1974 c. 14	National Insurance Act 1974	Section 6(1) and (3).
1975 c. 14	Social Security Act 1975	The whole act.
1975 c. 16	Industrial Injuries and Diseases (Old Cases) Act 1975	The whole act.
1975 c. 18	Social Security (Consequential Provisions) Act 1975	In Schedule 2, paragraphs 6, 8 and 9, 11, 69 and 70. In Schedule 3, paragraphs 1 to 20.
1975 c. 60	Social Security Pensions Act 1975	Part I. Sections 6 to 10. Sections 12 to 16A. Sections 18 to 21. Sections 23 to 25. Section 51A(13). Section 60(1)(a). In section 60A, the words "6(3)" and ", and paragraphs 2(3) and 4A of Schedule 1 to,". Section 62(1) and (3). In section 64(2), the words from "and as respects" to the end.
1975 c. 60	Social Security Pensions Act 1975	Section 65(4). In section 66(2), in paragraph (a), the words "Part I and" and in paragraph (b) the words "(except section 22)". Schedule 1. In Schedule 4, paragraphs 35 to 46, 49, 50, 53 to 64 and 66 and 67.
1975 c. 61	Child Benefit Act 1975	The whole act.
1976 c. 5	Education (School-leaving Dates) Act 1976	Section 2(4).
1976 c. 71	Supplementary Benefits Act 1976	Sections 22 and 23. In Schedule 7, paragraph 36.
1977 c. 5	Social Security (Miscellaneous Provisions) Act 1977	Sections 1 and 2. Section 3(1). Sections 4 to 6. Sections 8 to 11. Section 13. Sections 17 and 18. Section 20(1) and (2). Section 22(1) to (5). In section 23(2), the words from "and as respects" to the end. In section 24, in subsection (1), the definition of "the Old Cases Act", and subsections (2) and (4). Schedule 1.
1977 c. 49	National Health Service Act 1977	In Schedule 15, paragraphs 63, 64 and 67.
1978 c. 29	National Health Service (Scotland) Act 1978	In Schedule 16, paragraph 40.
1978 c. 44	Employment Protection (Consolidation) Act 1978	In Schedule 16, paragraphs 19 and 29.
1979 c. 18	Social Security Act 1979	Section 2. Sections 4 and 5. Section 9(1). Section 10. Sections 14 and 15. Section 19. Section 20(3). Schedule 1. Schedule 2. In Schedule 3, paragraphs 4 to 8, 10 and 11, in paragraph 13, the words "6(3) and" and paragraphs 14, 15, 23, 29, 31 and 32.
1980 c. 30	Social Security Act 1980	Section 2. In section 3, subsections (1) to (3) and (11). Section 4(3), (5) and (6). Section 5(1). Section 6(2) and (4). In section 9, subsections (1) and (2), in subsection (3), the words from the beginning to "and", in the second place where it occurs, in subsection (4), the words "The Secretary of State and" and subsections (5) and (7). In section 10, subsections (1) to (5) and in subsection (9) the words "the Secretary of State in conjunction with the Treasury or by", "or section 61 of the Social Security Act 1986" and "the Secretary of State or". Section 11. Section 13(1) to (3), (5) and (6). Section 14. Sections 17 and 18. Section 19(3). Schedule 1. In Schedule 2, paragraph 21. Schedule 3. In Schedule 4, paragraphs 10 and 14.
1980 c. 39	Social Security (No. 2) Act 1980	The whole act.
1980 c. 43	Magistrates' Courts Act 1980	In section 65(1), the paragraph (m) inserted by paragraph 54 of Schedule 10 to the Social Security Act 1986. In Schedule 7, paragraph 135.
1980 c. 48	Finance Act 1980	In Schedule 19, in paragraph 5(4), the words "section 133(3) of the Social Security Act 1975".
1981 c. 1	Social Security (Contributions) Act 1981	The whole act.
1981 c. 20	Judicial Pensions Act 1981	In Schedule 3, paragraph 10.
1981 c. 33	Social Security Act 1981	Sections 5 and 6. Section 8(2). In Schedule 1, paragraphs 3(a), 6 and 7. In Schedule 2, paragraph 2.
1982 c. 2	Social Security (Contributions) Act 1982	The whole act.
1982 c. 23	Oil and Gas (Enterprise) Act 1982	In Schedule 3, paragraphs 21 and 44.
1982 c. 24	Social Security and Housing Benefits Act 1982	Sections 1 to 7. Section 9. Sections 17 and 18. Sections 22, 23 and 23A. Sections 26 and 27. Section 37. Section 39(1) to (4). Section 44. Section 46(2). Section 48(2). Schedule 1. In Schedule 2, paragraphs 1 to 4. In Schedule 4, paragraphs 7 to 10, 12 and 13, 15 to 18, 30 to 34 and 39.
1982 c. 34	Forfeiture Act 1982	In section 4(5), the entry relating to the Child Benefit Act 1975.
1983 c. 41	Health and Social Services and Social Security Adjudications Act 1983	Schedule 8, except paragraphs 1(3)(a) and 29.
1984 c. 48	Health and Social Security Act 1984	Sections 11 to 14. Sections 16 to 18. Schedule 4. Schedule 5. In Schedule 7, paragraphs 1 to 3 and 6 to 8.
1985 c. 53	Social Security Act 1985	Section 7. Section 8(1). Sections 9 to 13. Section 18. Section 20. Section 27. Section 30. In Schedule 3, paragraph 1. In Schedule 4, paragraphs 3 to 7. In Schedule 5, paragraphs 5, 8 and 9, 11 and 13 to 15.
1986 c. 50	Social Security Act 1986	Sections 18 to 29. Section 30(1) to (9) and (11). Sections 31 to 36. Section 37(1). Section 38. Sections 40 to 51. Section 52(3) to (10). Section 53. Section 54(2). Section 55. In section 56, in subsection (2)(a), the words "other than an offence relating to housing benefit or community charge benefits", subsection (2)(b) and the word "and" immediately preceding it, subsection (3)(b) and the word "and" immediately preceding it and subsections (4) to (4B). Section 58.
1986 c. 50	Social Security Act 1986	In section 61, in subsection (1), the words "the Committee, the Council or", in subsection (3), the words "the Committee, the Council or" and "or, in the case of the Council, given their advice,", in subsection (4), the words "Committee or", in each place where they occur, in subsection (5), the words "the Committee, the Council or", subsections (7) to (9) and in subsection (10), the definitions of "the Committee" and "the Council". Sections 62 to 69. Section 70(1). Sections 73 and 74. Section 79(3) and (4).
1986 c. 50	Social Security Act 1986	In section 80(1), the words "and V". Section 81. In section 83, subsection (2), subsection (3)(b) to (e), and in subsection (5), the words from "30" to "section", in the second place where it occurs. In section 84, in subsection (1), the definition of "applicable amount", paragraphs (c) and (d) of the definition of "the benefit Acts", the definitions of "dwelling", "housing authority", "housing benefit scheme", "Housing Revenue Account dwelling", "income-related benefit", "local authority", "long-term benefit", "new town corporation", "primary Class 1 contributions", "secondary Class 1 contributions", "qualifying benefit", "rate rebate", "rent rebate", "rent allowance", "rates", "rating authority", "trade dispute", "war disablement pension" and "war widow's pension", and subsection (3).
1986 c. 50	Social Security Act 1986	In section 85, subsection (1)(a) to (c) and (f), subsection (3)(c) and (d), subsection (4), in subsection (5), the words "and (7)", subsection (7), in subsection (8), the words from "and sums" to the end and subsections (9) to (12). Schedule 3, except paragraph 17. Schedule 4. In Schedule 5, paragraphs 2 to 20 and in Part II, paragraphs (b) and (c). Schedules 6 and 7. In Schedule 8, paragraphs 1 to 3 and 5 to 7. In Schedule 10, paragraphs 10, 34, 40, 48, 54, 62 to 67, 68(2), 69, 70, 72, 74, 77, 83 to 88, 90 to 92, 95, 97 to 100, 103(a) and (b), 104 to 107 and 108(a).
1987 c. 7	Social Fund (Maternity and Funeral Expenses) Act 1987	The whole act.
1987 c. 18	Debtors (Scotland) Act 1987	Section 68.
1987 c. 42	Family Law Reform Act 1987	Section 2(1)(g). In Schedule 2, paragraphs 59 and 91 to 93.
1988 c. 1	Income and Corporation Taxes Act 1988	In Schedule 29, in paragraph 14, the words "the Social Security Act 1975 and", and in paragraph 32, the entries relating to the Social Security Act 1975 and the Social Security Act 1986.
1988 c. 7	Social Security Act 1988	Sections 1 to 8. Sections 10 and 11. Section 17. In section 18, in subsection (2), the words from "section 1" to "that Act". Schedule 1. In Schedule 2, paragraph 1(1). Schedule 3. In Schedule 4, paragraphs 3 to 20 and 23 to 30.
1988 c. 19	Employment Act 1988	Section 27.
1988 c. 34	Legal Aid Act 1988	Section 34(14).
1988 c. 39	Finance Act 1988	In Schedule 3, in paragraph 31, the words "the Social Security Act 1975 and".
1988 c. 41	Local Government Finance Act 1988	In Schedule 4, in paragraph 28(2), the words "Part III of the Social Security Act 1975,". Schedule 10, except paragraphs 1, 9(1) and (5).
1988 c. 50	Housing Act 1988	Section 121(4) to (6).
1989 c. 24	Social Security Act 1989	Sections 1 to 3. Section 4(1) to (4). Section 5(1) to (4). Section 6(1). Section 7(1) to (5). Sections 9 to 19. Section 21. Section 22(1) to (6) and (8). Section 27. In section 28, in subsection (2), the words "1 to 4" and "9 to 12 and 22" and subsections (3) and (4). In section 29, subsections (2) and (5). In section 30(1), the definitions of "the 1982 Act" and "the Old Cases Act". Section 32. In Schedule 1, paragraphs 1 to 10. Schedules 2 and 3. In Schedule 4, paragraphs 1 to 21 and 24. Schedule 7, except paragraphs 1, 14, 21 and 27. In Schedule 8, paragraphs 1 to 7, 9, 10(1), 11, 12(2), (5) and (6) and 14 to 18 and 19(a) and (b).
1989 c. 42	Local Government and Housing Act 1989	Section 81. In Schedule 11, paragraph 113.
1990 c. 1	Capital Allowances Act 1990	In Schedule 1, paragraph 2.
1990 c. 19	National Health Service and Community Care Act 1990	In Schedule 9, paragraph 15.
1990 c. 27	Social Security Act 1990	Sections 1 to 5. Section 6(1) to (3). Sections 8 to 10. Section 16. Section 17(1) to (9). In section 20, the definitions of "the 1982 Act", "the 1986 Act", "the 1989 Act" and "the Old Cases Act". Section 22(1). In Schedule 1, paragraphs 1 to 4, 5(1) and (2) and 6. Schedule 5. In Schedule 6, paragraphs 1, 3, 4(1) and (2), 5 to 7, 8(1), (3), (5), (7), (8) and (11), 9 to 12, 14 to 26, 27(2), 28, 30 and 31(a) and (b).
1990 c. 37	Human Fertilisation and Embryology Act 1990	In Schedule 4, paragraph 2.
1990 c. 41	Courts and Legal Services Act 1990	In Schedule 10, paragraphs 36, 37 and 46. In Schedule 11, in the entry beginning "Social Security Commissioner", the words "appointed under section 97 of the Social Security Act 1975". In Schedule 18, paragraph 24.
1991 c. 3	Statutory Sick Pay Act 1991	Sections 1 and 2. Section 3(1)(a) and (b) and (3) to (5). Section 4(5).
1991 c. 17	Maintenance Enforcement Act 1991	Section 9.
1991 c. 21	Disability Living Allowance and Disability Working Allowance Act 1991	Section 1. Section 2(1). Section 3. Section 4(1). Sections 5 and 6. Section 7(1). Sections 8 and 9. Sections 11 to 14. Schedule 1. In Schedule 2, paragraphs 2(2), 3 to 5, 8, 10 and 11, 15 to 17 and 19. In Schedule 3, Part I.
1991 c. 42	Social Security (Contributions) Act 1991	The whole act.
1991 c. 48	Child Support Act 1991	In Schedule 3, in paragraph 1(1), the words "under Schedule 10 to the Social Security Act 1975" and in paragraph 3(2)(c) the words "under paragraph 1A of Schedule 10 to the Social Security Act 1975".
