= Supply Powers Act 1975 =

Act of the Parliament of the United Kingdom

Supply Powers Act 1975 (Note: Section 9(1).)
- Act of Parliament
- Parliament of the United Kingdom
- Long title: An Act to consolidate the outstanding provisions of the Ministry of Supply Act 1939 and enactments and instruments amending those provisions, with amendments to give effect to recommendations of the Law Commission and the Scottish Law Commission.
- Citation: 1975 c. 9
- Territorial extent: United Kingdom (Note: Section 9(3).)

Dates
- Royal assent: 13 March 1975
- Commencement: 13 April 1975 (Note: Section 9(2).)

Other legislation
- Amends: Atomic Energy Act 1946; See § Repealed enactments
- Repeals/revokes: See § Repealed enactments
- Amended by: Criminal Justice Act 1982; Transport and Works Act 1992; Higher Education and Research Act 2017

Status: Amended

Text of statute as originally enacted

Revised text of statute as amended

Text of the Supply Powers Act 1975 as in force today (including any amendments) within the United Kingdom, from legislation.gov.uk.

The Supply Powers Act 1975 (c. 9) is an act of the Parliament of the United Kingdom that consolidated enactments relating to the powers of the Secretary of State to acquire, produce, and dispose of materials and services for the public service in the United Kingdom.

== Provisions ==
=== Repealed enactments ===
Section 8(1) of the act repealed 4 enactments and revoked 11 instruments, listed in parts I and II of schedule 2 to the act, respectively.

Part I – Enactments repealed
Citation	Short title	Extent of repeal
2 & 3 Geo. 6. c. 38	Ministry of Supply Act 1939	The whole act.
6 & 7 Eliz. 2. c. 51	Public Records Act 1958	In Schedule 2, the entry relating to section 17 of the Ministry of Supply Act 1939.
1968 c. 32	Industrial Expansion Act 1968	Section 13 and Schedule 3.
1971 c. 75	Civil Aviation Act 1971	In Schedule 10, paragraph 1.

Part II – Orders revoked
Citation	Title	Extent of revocation
SR&O 1939/877	Ministry of Supply (Transfer of Powers) (No. 1) Order 1939	The whole order.
SR&O 1946/378	Transfer of Functions (Various Commodities) Order 1946	The whole order.
SR&O 1947/984	Transfer of Functions (Home-Grown Raw Wool) Order 1947	The whole order.
SR&O 1947/2472	Transfer of Functions (Medical Supplies) Order 1947	The whole order.
SI 1949/355	Transfer of Functions (Ethyl Chloride and Kitchen Waste) Order 1949	The whole order.
SI 1950/509	Transfer of Functions (Kitchen Waste) Order 1950	The whole order.
SI 1951/1242	Transfer of Functions (Various Materials) Order 1951	The whole order.
SI 1954/1028	Transfer of Functions (Ministry of Materials) Order 1954	Article 2(2)(a).
SI 1969/1498	Minister of Technology Order 1969	In Schedule 1, paragraph 1(g).
SI 1970/1537	Secretary of State for Trade and Industry Order 1970	In Schedule 1, paragraphs 1 and 7(c).
SI 1971/719	Ministry of Aviation Supply Order 1971	In the Schedule, paragraph 1(1).
