= Industrial Injuries and Diseases (Northern Ireland Old Cases) Act 1975 =

Act of the Parliament of the United Kingdom

Industrial Injuries and Diseases (Northern Ireland Old Cases) Act 1975 (Note: Section 10(1).)
- Act of Parliament
- Parliament of the United Kingdom
- Long title: An Act to consolidate the Workmen's Compensation (Supplementation) Measures (Northern Ireland) 1966 to 1974 and related enactments.
- Citation: 1975 c. 17
- Territorial extent: Northern Ireland (Note: Section 10(2).)

Dates
- Royal assent: 20 March 1975
- Commencement: 6 April 1975 (Note: Section 10(3).)
- Repealed: 1 July 1992
Other legislation
Repealed by	Social Security (Consequential Provisions) (Northern Ireland) Act 1992
Relates to	Social Security Act 1975; Social Security (Northern Ireland) Act 1975; Industrial Injuries and Diseases (Old Cases) Act 1975; Social Security (Consequential Provisions) Act 1975

Status: Repealed

Text of statute as originally enacted

The Industrial Injuries and Diseases (Northern Ireland Old Cases) Act 1975 (c. 17) was an act of the Parliament of the United Kingdom that consolidated enactments related to the supplementation of workmen's compensation in Northern Ireland.

The Industrial Injuries and Diseases (Old Cases) Act 1975 made equivalent provisions for England and Wales and Scotland.

The enactments consolidated by this act were repealed by the Social Security (Consequential Provisions) Act 1975.

== Subsequent developments ==
The whole act was repealed by section 3(1) of, and schedule 1 to, the Social Security (Consequential Provisions) (Northern Ireland) Act 1992, which came into force on 1 July 1992.
