= Social Security (Northern Ireland) Act 1975 =

Act of the Parliament of the United Kingdom

Social Security (Northern Ireland) Act 1975 (Note: Section 158(1).)
- Act of Parliament
- Parliament of the United Kingdom
- Long title: An Act to consolidate for Northern Ireland so much of the Social Security Act 1973 as establishes a basic scheme of contributions and benefits, together with the National Insurance (Industrial Injuries) Measures (Northern Ireland) 1966 to 1974 and other enactments relating to social security.
- Citation: 1975 c. 15
- Territorial extent: Northern Ireland (Note: Section 158(2).)

Dates
- Royal assent: 20 March 1975
- Commencement: 6 April 1975 (Note: Section 158(3).)
Other legislation
Amended by	Social Security (Consequential Provisions) (Northern Ireland) Act 1992
Relates to	Social Security Act 1975; Social Security (Consequential Provisions) Act 1975; Industrial Injuries and Diseases (Northern Ireland Old Cases) Act 1975; Social Security Contributions and Benefits (Northern Ireland) Act 1992; Social Security Administration (Northern Ireland) Act 1992; Social Security (Consequential Provisions) (Northern Ireland) Act 1992

Status: Partially repealed

Text of statute as originally enacted

Revised text of statute as amended

Text of the Social Security (Northern Ireland) Act 1975 as in force today (including any amendments) within the United Kingdom, from legislation.gov.uk.

The Social Security (Northern Ireland) Act 1975 (c. 15) is an act of the Parliament of the United Kingdom that consolidated enactments relating to social security contributions and benefits in Northern Ireland.

The Social Security Act 1975 made equivalent provisions for England and Wales and Scotland.

The enactments consolidated by this act were repealed by the Social Security (Consequential Provisions) Act 1975.

== Subsequent developments ==
The whole act, except sections 97(4) and 158 and paragraphs 5(2), 6, 7 and 7A of schedule 10, was repealed by section 3(1) of, and schedule 1 to, the Social Security (Consequential Provisions) (Northern Ireland) Act 1992, which came into force on 1 July 1992. The repealed provisions were re-enacted in the Social Security Contributions and Benefits (Northern Ireland) Act 1992 and the Social Security Administration (Northern Ireland) Act 1992.
