= Social Security Act 1975 =

Act of the Parliament of the United Kingdom

Social Security Act 1975 (Note: Section 169(1).)
- Act of Parliament
- Parliament of the United Kingdom
- Long title: An Act to consolidate for England, Wales and Scotland so much of the Social Security Act 1973 as establishes a basic scheme of contributions and benefits, together with the National Insurance (Industrial Injuries) Acts 1965 to 1974 and other enactments relating to social security.
- Citation: 1975 c. 14
- Territorial extent: England and Wales; Scotland; (Note: Section 169(2). Sections 9(3) to (6), 128(4), 142(2) and (5) and Schedules 2 and 17 also extend to Northern Ireland.)

Dates
- Royal assent: 20 March 1975
- Commencement: 6 April 1975 (Note: Section 169(3).)
- Repealed: 1 July 1992
Other legislation
Amended by	Administration of Justice Act 1977; Senior Courts Act 1981; Bankruptcy (Scotland) Act 1985; Family Law Reform Act 1987
Repealed by	Social Security (Consequential Provisions) Act 1992
Relates to	Social Security (Northern Ireland) Act 1975; Industrial Injuries and Diseases (Northern Ireland Old Cases) Act 1975; Industrial Injuries and Diseases (Old Cases) Act 1975; Social Security (Consequential Provisions) Act 1975

Status: Repealed

Text of statute as originally enacted

The Social Security Act 1975 (c. 14) was an act of the Parliament of the United Kingdom that consolidated enactments relating to social security contributions and benefits in Great Britain.

The Social Security (Northern Ireland) Act 1975 made equivalent provisions for Northern Ireland.

The enactments consolidated by this act were repealed by the Social Security (Consequential Provisions) Act 1975.

== Subsequent developments ==
The whole act was repealed by section 3(1) of, and schedule 1 to, the Social Security (Consequential Provisions) Act 1992, which came into force on 1 July 1992.
