= List of acts of the Parliament of the United Kingdom from 1975 =

This is a list of acts of the Parliament of the United Kingdom passed in 1975.

Acts passed since 1963 are cited by calendar year, as opposed to the convention used for earlier acts of citing the regnal year(s) in which the relevant parliamentary session was held. Each act passed in a respective year is given a chapter number (abbreviated "c."), denoted by Arabic numerals in the case of public general acts, lowercase Roman numerals in the case of local acts, or italicised Arabic numerals in the case of personal acts. These run as separate series.

120 acts of Parliament were passed in 1975: 83 public general acts, 36 local acts and 1 personal act.

indicates that an act has been transcribed on Wikisource, indicates that an act is available to view at legislation.gov.uk, and indicates the location of the original act in the Parliamentary Archives.

== Public general acts ==
Short title	Citation	Royal assent
Long title
Consolidated Fund Act 1975	1975 c. 1	30 January 1975
An Act to apply certain sums out of the Consolidated Fund to the service of the years ending on 31st March 1975 and 1976.
Education Act 1975 (repealed)	1975 c. 2	25 February 1975
An Act to make further provision with respect to awards and grants by local education authorities; to enable the Secretary of State to bestow awards on students in respect of their attendance at adult education colleges; and to increase the proportion of the expenditure incurred in the maintenance or provision of aided and special agreement schools that can be met by contributions or grants from the Secretary of State. (Repealed by Education Act 1996 (c. 56))
Arbitration Act 1975 (repealed)	1975 c. 3	25 February 1975
An Act to give effect to the New York Convention on the Recognition and Enforcement of Foreign Arbitral Awards. (Repealed by Arbitration (Scotland) Act 2010 (asp 1))
Biological Standards Act 1975 (repealed)	1975 c. 4	25 February 1975
An Act to establish a body corporate having functions relating to the establishment of standards for, the provision of standard preparations of, and the testing of biological substances; to provide for the transfer of certain property, rights, liabilities and obligations from the Medical Research Council to the Secretary of State for Social Services; and for connected purposes. (Repealed by Health and Social Care Act 2008 (c. 14))
General Rate Act 1975	1975 c. 5	25 February 1975
An Act to provide for the postponement of the coming into force of new valuation lists under Part V of the General Rate Act 1967. (Note: General Rate Act 1967 (c. 9))
Housing Rents and Subsidies Act 1975 (repealed)	1975 c. 6	25 February 1975
An Act to repeal certain provisions of the Housing Finance Act 1972; (Note: Housing Finance Act 1972 (c. 47)) to make further provision as to rents; to introduce new housing subsidies for local authorities and new town corporations and abolish certain existing subsidies; to render certain housing associations whose rules restrict membership to tenants or prospective tenants and preclude the grant or assignment of tenancies to persons other than members eligible for housing association grant and revenue deficit grant under the Housing Act 1974; (Note: Housing Act 1974 (c. 44)) to make minor amendments of certain enactments relating to housing; and for connected purposes. (Repealed by Housing (Consequential Provisions) Act 1985 (c. 71))
Finance Act 1975	1975 c. 7	13 March 1975
An Act to grant certain duties, to alter other duties, and to amend the law relating to the National Debt and the Public Revenue, and to make further provision in connection with Finance.
Offshore Petroleum Development (Scotland) Act 1975	1975 c. 8	13 March 1975
An Act to provide for the acquisition by the Secretary of State of land in Scotland for purposes relating to exploration for and exploitation of offshore petroleum; to enable the Secretary of State to carry out works and facilitate operations for those purposes; to regulate such operations in certain sea areas; to provide for the reinstatement of land used for those purposes; and for purposes connected with those matters.
Supply Powers Act 1975	1975 c. 9	13 March 1975
An Act to consolidate the outstanding provisions of the Ministry of Supply Act 1939 (Note: Ministry of Supply Act 1939 (2 & 3 Geo. 6. c. 38)) and enactments and instruments amending those provisions, with amendments to give effect to recommendations of the Law Commission and the Scottish Law Commission.
Statute Law (Repeals) Act 1975	1975 c. 10	13 March 1975
An Act to promote the reform of the statute law by the repeal, in accordance with recommendations of the Law Commission and the Scottish Law Commission, of certain enactments which are no longer of practical utility, and to make other provision recommended by the Commissions in connection with those repeals.
Social Security Benefits Act 1975	1975 c. 11	13 March 1975
An Act to make further provision with respect to basic scheme benefits and benefits in respect of industrial injuries and diseases; to increase family allowances and amend section 8 of the Family Allowances Act 1965, (Note: Family Allowances Act 1965 (c. 53)) to amend Parts I and III of Schedule 2 to the Supplementary Benefit Act 1966; (Note: Ministry of Social Security Act 1966 (c. 20)) and for purposes connected with those matters.
Consolidated Fund (No. 2) Act 1975	1975 c. 12	20 March 1975
An Act to apply certain sums out of the Consolidated Fund to the service of the years ending on 31st March 1974 and 1975.
Unsolicited Goods and Services (Amendment) Act 1975	1975 c. 13	20 March 1975
An Act to amend the Unsolicited Goods and Services Act 1971, (Note: Unsolicited Goods and Services Act 1971 (c. 30)) to enable the Secretary of State to make regulations with respect to the contents and form of notes of agreement, invoices and similar documents and to provide for conviction on indictment in relation to an offence under section 3(2) of the said Act; and for connected matters.
Social Security Act 1975 (repealed)	1975 c. 14	20 March 1975
An Act to consolidate for England, Wales and Scotland so much of the Social Security Act 1973 as establishes a basic scheme of contributions and benefits, together with the National Insurance (Industrial Injuries) Acts 1965 to 1974 and other enactments relating to social security. (Repealed by Social Security (Consequential Provisions) Act 1992 (c. 6))
Social Security (Northern Ireland) Act 1975	1975 c. 15	20 March 1975
An Act to consolidate for Northern Ireland so much of the Social Security Act 1973 (Note: Social Security Act 1973 (c. 38)) as establishes a basic scheme of contributions and benefits, together with the National Insurance (Industrial Injuries) Measures (Northern Ireland) 1966 to 1974 and other enactments relating to social security.
Industrial Injuries and Diseases (Old Cases) Act 1975 (repealed)	1975 c. 16	20 March 1975
An Act to consolidate the Industrial Injuries and Diseases (Old Cases) Acts 1967 to 1974 and related enactments. (Repealed by Social Security (Consequential Provisions) Act 1992 (c. 6))
Industrial Injuries and Diseases (Northern Ireland Old Cases) Act 1975 (repealed)	1975 c. 17	20 March 1975
An Act to consolidate the Workmen's Compensation (Supplementation) Measures (Northern Ireland) 1966 to 1974 and related enactments. (Repealed by Social Security (Consequential Provisions) (Northern Ireland) Act 1992 (c. 9))
Social Security (Consequential Provisions) Act 1975	1975 c. 18	20 March 1975
An Act to make provision consequential on, and in connection with, the Social Security Act 1975, (Note: Social Security Act 1975 (c. 14)) the Industrial Injuries and Diseases (Old Cases) Act 1975, (Note: Industrial Injuries and Diseases (Old Cases) Act 1975 (c. 16)) the Social Security (Northern Ireland) Act 1975 (Note: Social Security (Northern Ireland) Act 1975 (c. 15)) and the Industrial Injuries and Diseases (Northern Ireland Old Cases) Act 1975. (Note: Industrial Injuries and Diseases (Northern Ireland Old Cases) Act 1975 (c. 17))
Export Guarantees Amendment Act 1975 (repealed)	1975 c. 19	27 March 1975
An Act to make further provision in connection with the powers and duties of the Secretary of State under the Export Guarantees Acts 1968 (Note: Export Guarantees Act 1968 (c. 26)) and 1970. (Note: Export Guarantees and Payments Act 1970 (c. 15)) (Repealed by Export Guarantees Act 1975 (c. 38))
District Courts (Scotland) Act 1975 (repealed)	1975 c. 20	27 March 1975
An Act to make provision as respects district courts and justices of the peace in Scotland, to amend sections 28 and 29 of the Licensing (Scotland) Act 1959; (Note: Licensing (Scotland) Act 1959 (7 & 8 Eliz. 2. c. 51)) and for connected purposes. (Repealed by Justice of the Peace Courts (Sheriffdom of South Strathclyde, Dumfries and Galloway) etc. Order 2009 (SSI 2009/332))
Criminal Procedure (Scotland) Act 1975	1975 c. 21	8 May 1975
An Act to consolidate certain enactments relating to criminal procedure in Scotland.
Oil Taxation Act 1975	1975 c. 22	8 May 1975
An Act to impose a new tax in respect of profits from substances won or capable of being won under the authority of licences granted under the Petroleum (Production) Act 1934 (Note: Petroleum (Production) Act 1934 (24 & 25 Geo. 5. c. 36)) or the Petroleum (Production) Act (Northern Ireland) 1964; (Note: Petroleum (Production) Act (Northern Ireland) 1964 (c. 28 (N.I.))) to make in the law relating to income tax and corporation tax amendments connected with such substances or with petroleum companies; and for connected purposes.
Reservoirs Act 1975	1975 c. 23	8 May 1975
An Act to make further provision against escapes of water from large reservoirs or from lakes or lochs artificially created or enlarged.
House of Commons Disqualification Act 1975	1975 c. 24	8 May 1975
An Act to consolidate certain enactments relating to disqualification for membership of the House of Commons.
Northern Ireland Assembly Disqualification Act 1975	1975 c. 25	8 May 1975
An Act to consolidate certain enactments relating to disqualification for membership of the Northern Ireland Assembly.
Ministers of the Crown Act 1975	1975 c. 26	8 May 1975
An Act to consolidate the enactments relating to the redistribution of functions between Ministers of the Crown, the alteration of the style and title of such Ministers and certain other provisions about such Ministers.
Ministerial and other Salaries Act 1975	1975 c. 27	8 May 1975
An Act to consolidate the enactments relating to the salaries of Ministers and Opposition Leaders and Chief Whips and to other matters connected therewith.
Housing Rents and Subsidies (Scotland) Act 1975	1975 c. 28	8 May 1975
An Act to repeal certain provisions of the Housing (Financial Provisions) (Scotland) Act 1972; (Note: Housing (Financial Provisions) (Scotland) Act 1972 (c. 46)) to make further provision as to the rents of houses provided by housing authorities in Scotland and of those subject to the Rent (Scotland) Acts 1971 to 1974; to provide for agreements for the exercise by housing co-operatives of local authority housing functions; to render certain housing associations in Scotland, whose rules restrict membership to tenants or prospective tenants and preclude the grant or assignation of tenancies to persons other than members, eligible for housing association grant and revenue deficit grant under the Housing Act 1974; to amend the law relating to housing subsidies and accounts in Scotland; and to make minor amendments to certain enactments relating to housing and new towns there.
Mental Health (Amendment) Act 1975	1975 c. 29	8 May 1975
An Act to strengthen the Mental Health Act 1959 (Note: Mental Health Act 1959 (7 & 8 Eliz. 2. c. 72)) to enable potentially dangerous patients to be detained in institutions.
Local Government (Scotland) Act 1975	1975 c. 30	8 May 1975
An Act to make further provision as respects local government finance in Scotland; to restrict certain grants under the Transport Act 1968; (Note: Transport Act 1968 (c. 73)) to make provision for the appointment and functions of a Commissioner for the investigation of administrative action taken by or on behalf of local and other authorities; to make further provision as respects social work; to make certain minor amendments of or consequential on the Local Government (Scotland) Act 1973; (Note: Local Government (Scotland) Act 1973 (c. 65)) and for connected purposes.
Malta Republic Act 1975	1975 c. 31	8 May 1975
An Act to make provision as to the operation of the law in relation to Malta as a republic within the Commonwealth.
Prices Act 1975 (repealed)	1975 c. 32	8 May 1975
An Act to amend sections 1, 2 and 9(4) of the Prices Act 1974 (Note: Prices Act 1974 (c. 24)) and to make consequential amendments in the Schedule to that Act. (Repealed by Statute Law (Repeals) Act 2004 (c. 14))
Referendum Act 1975 (repealed)	1975 c. 33	8 May 1975
An Act to provide for the holding of a referendum on the United Kingdom's membership of the European Economic Community. (Repealed by Statute Law (Repeals) Act 1986 (c. 12))
Evidence (Proceedings in other Jurisdictions) Act 1975	1975 c. 34	22 May 1975
An Act to make new provision for enabling the High Court, the Court of Session and the High Court of Justice in Northern Ireland to assist in obtaining evidence required for the purposes of proceedings in other jurisdictions; to extend the powers of those courts to issue process effective throughout the United Kingdom for securing the attendance of witnesses; and for purposes connected with those matters.
Farriers (Registration) Act 1975	1975 c. 35	22 May 1975
An Act to prevent and avoid suffering by and cruelty to horses arising from the shoeing of horses by unskilled persons; to promote the proper shoeing of horses; to promote the training of farriers and shoeing smiths; to provide for the establishment of a Farriers Registration Council to register persons engaged in farriery and the shoeing of horses; to prohibit the shoeing of horses by unqualified persons; and for purposes connected therewith.
Air Travel Reserve Fund Act 1975 (repealed)	1975 c. 36	22 May 1975
An Act to make provision for establishing a fund from which payments may be made in certain cases in respect of losses or liabilities incurred by customers of air travel organisers in consequence of the inability of the air travel organisers to meet their financial commitments in respect of certain descriptions of travel contracts, and for establishing an agency to hold, manage and apply the fund; to provide for requiring contributions from air travel organisers for the purposes of the fund; to provide for loans to the agency by the Secretary of State; and for purposes connected with the matters aforesaid. (Repealed by Statute Law (Repeals) Act 1995 (c. 44))
Nursing Homes Act 1975 (repealed)	1975 c. 37	3 July 1975
An Act to consolidate certain enactments relating to nursing homes. (Repealed by Registered Homes Act 1984 (c. 23))
Export Guarantees Act 1975 (repealed)	1975 c. 38	3 July 1975
An Act to consolidate the Export Guarantees Acts 1968 to 1975. (Repealed by Export Guarantees and Overseas Investment Act 1978 (c. 18))
Hearing Aid Council (Extension) Act 1975 (repealed)	1975 c. 39	3 July 1975
An Act to extend the Hearing Aid Council Act 1968 (Note: Hearing Aid Council Act 1968 (c. 50)) to Northern Ireland. (Repealed by Health and Social Care Act 2008 (c. 14))
Diseases of Animals Act 1975 (repealed)	1975 c. 40	3 July 1975
An Act to make further provision for preventing the introduction or spreading, through imports into Great Britain, of diseases of animals and poultry, and for purposes connected therewith. (Repealed by Animal Health Act 1981 (c. 22))
Industrial and Provident Societies Act 1975 (repealed)	1975 c. 41	3 July 1975
An Act to raise the limit on the interest in the shares of a society registered under the Industrial and Provident Societies Act 1965 (Note: Industrial and Provident Societies Act 1965 (c. 12)) which any one member may hold and to authorise the further alteration of that limit from time to time. (Repealed by Co-operative and Community Benefit Societies Act 2014 (c. 14))
New Towns Act 1975 (repealed)	1975 c. 42	3 July 1975
An Act to raise the limits imposed by the New Towns Act 1965 (Note: New Towns Act 1965 (c. 59)) on the amounts which may be borrowed by the development corporations for new towns and the Commission for the New Towns and make provision for the payment of pensions to chairmen of development corporations and of remuneration and allowances to members of committees conducting business for the Commission. (Repealed by New Towns Act 1981 (c. 64))
British Leyland Act 1975 (repealed)	1975 c. 43	3 July 1975
An Act to authorise the Secretary of State to acquire shares in British Leyland Motor Corporation Limited and in a company formed for the purpose of acquiring shares in British Leyland Motor Corporation Limited. (Repealed by Statute Law (Repeals) Act 1993 (c. 50))
Appropriation Act 1975	1975 c. 44	1 August 1975
An Act to apply a sum out of the Consolidated Fund to the service of the year ending on 31st March 1976, to appropriate the supplies granted in this Session of Parliament, and to repeal certain Consolidated Fund and Appropriation Acts.
Finance (No. 2) Act 1975	1975 c. 45	1 August 1975
An Act to grant certain duties, to alter other duties, and to amend the law relating to the National Debt and the Public Revenue, and to make further provision in connection with Finance.
International Road Haulage Permits Act 1975 (repealed)	1975 c. 46	1 August 1975
An Act to make further provision with respect to the forgery, carriage and production of licences, permits, authorisations and other documents relating to the international carriage of goods by road; and for purposes connected therewith. (Repealed by Haulage Permits and Trailer Registration Act 2018 (c. 19))
Litigants in Person (Costs and Expenses) Act 1975	1975 c. 47	1 August 1975
An Act to make further provision as to the costs or expenses recoverable by litigants in person in civil proceedings.
Conservation of Wild Creatures and Wild Plants Act 1975	1975 c. 48	1 August 1975
An Act to provide for the protection and conservation of wild creatures and of plants growing wild and to amend section 9 of the Badgers Act 1973. (Note: Badgers Act 1973 (c. 57))
Mobile Homes Act 1975	1975 c. 49	1 August 1975
An Act to amend the law in respect of mobile homes and residential caravan sites; and for purposes connected therewith.
Guard Dogs Act 1975	1975 c. 50	1 August 1975
An Act to regulate the keeping and use of guard dogs; and for purposes connected therewith.
Salmon and Freshwater Fisheries Act 1975	1975 c. 51	1 August 1975
An Act to consolidate the Salmon and Freshwater Fisheries Act 1923 (Note: Salmon and Freshwater Fisheries Act 1923 (13 & 14 Geo. 5. c. 16)) and certain other enactments relating to salmon and freshwater fisheries, and to repeal certain obsolete enactments relating to such fisheries.
Safety of Sports Grounds Act 1975	1975 c. 52	1 August 1975
An Act to make provision for safety at sports stadia and other sports grounds.
Public Service Vehicles (Arrest of Offenders) Act 1975 (repealed)	1975 c. 53	1 August 1975
An Act to authorise the arrest without warrant of certain persons suspected of contravening regulations about the conduct of passengers in public service vehicles. (Repealed by Transport and Works Act 1992 (c. 42))
Limitation Act 1975	1975 c. 54	1 August 1975
An Act to amend the law about the limitation of actions and other proceedings.
Statutory Corporations (Financial Provisions) Act 1975	1975 c. 55	1 August 1975
An Act to provide further (by extending section 2 of the Statutory Corporations (Financial Provisions) Act 1974) (Note: Statutory Corporations (Financial Provisions) Act 1974 (c. 8)) for compensating certain nationalised industries for their losses due to price restraint; and to make other provision with respect to finance and administration in the public sector.
Coal Industry Act 1975	1975 c. 56	1 August 1975
An Act to provide for grants to the National Coal Board to meet expenditure under a scheme providing for compensation for pneumoconiosis; to enable the Board to withdraw support to enable coal to be worked and to work coal in former copyhold land; to make further provision in relation to opencast operations; and for purposes connected therewith.
Remuneration, Charges and Grants Act 1975 (repealed)	1975 c. 57	1 August 1975
An Act to limit liability for certain remuneration; to enable certain provisions of Part II of the Counter-Inflation Act 1973 (Note: Counter-Inflation Act 1973 (c. 9)) to be extended and to amend section 2 of that Act; to enable grants to local authorities to be reduced in certain circumstances; to enable housing subsidy to be increased and to provide for a new grant to local authorities in Scotland; and for connected purposes. (Repealed by Statute Law (Repeals) Act 1989 (c. 43))
Lotteries Act 1975 (repealed)	1975 c. 58	7 August 1975
An Act to make further provision with regard to lotteries promoted on behalf of societies or as incidents of entertainments; to authorise local authorities to promote lotteries; and for connected purposes. (Repealed by Gambling Act 2005 (c. 19))
Criminal Jurisdiction Act 1975	1975 c. 59	7 August 1975
An Act to create extra-territorial offences under the law of Northern Ireland, to amend as respects those and other offences the criminal law of Northern Ireland, to provide for obtaining evidence in Northern Ireland for the trial of offences in the Republic of Ireland and to amend the Backing of Warrants (Republic of Ireland) Act 1965, (Note: Backing of Warrants (Republic of Ireland) Act 1965 (c. 45)) the Explosive Substances Act 1883 (Note: Explosive Substances Act 1883 (46 & 47 Vict. c. 3)) and the law about the prosecution of offences.
Social Security Pensions Act 1975	1975 c. 60	7 August 1975
An Act to provide for relating the rates of social security retirement pensions and certain other benefits to the earnings on which contributions have been paid; to enable employed earners to be contracted-out of full social security contributions and benefits where the requisite benefits are provided by an occupational pension scheme; to make provision for securing that men and women are afforded equal access to occupational pension schemes; and to make other amendments in the law relating to social security (including an amendment of Part II of the Social Security Act 1975 introducing a new non-contributory benefit called "mobility allowance"); and to make other provision about occupational pensions.
Child Benefit Act 1975 (repealed)	1975 c. 61	7 August 1975
An Act to replace family allowances with a new benefit to be known as child benefit and, pending the introduction of that benefit, to provide an interim benefit for unmarried or separated parents with children; to amend the Family Allowances Act 1965 as respects children entitled to non-contributory invalidity pension; to repeal paragraph 5 of Schedule 2 to the Supplementary Benefit Act 1966; and for purposes connected with those matters. (Repealed by Social Security (Consequential Provisions) Act 1992 (c. 6))
Northern Ireland (Emergency Provisions) (Amendment) Act 1975	1975 c. 62	7 August 1975
An Act to amend the Northern Ireland (Emergency Provisions) Act 1973; (Note: Northern Ireland (Emergency Provisions) Act 1973 (c. 53)) to make further provision with respect to criminal proceedings, the maintenance of order and the detection of crime in Northern Ireland; to provide for the detention of terrorists there; and for connected purposes.
Inheritance (Provision for Family and Dependants) Act 1975	1975 c. 63	12 November 1975
An Act to make fresh provision for empowering the court to make orders for the making out of the estate of a deceased person of provision for the spouse, former spouse, child, child of the family or dependant of that person; and for matters connected therewith.
Iron and Steel Act 1975 (repealed)	1975 c. 64	12 November 1975
An Act to consolidate certain enactments relating to the British Steel Corporation and the iron and steel industry. (Repealed by Iron and Steel Act 1982 (c. 25))
Sex Discrimination Act 1975 (repealed)	1975 c. 65	12 November 1975
An Act to render unlawful certain kinds of sex discrimination and discrimination on the ground of marriage, and establish a Commission with the function of working towards the elimination of such discrimination and promoting equality of opportunity between men and women generally; and for related purposes. (Repealed by Equality Act 2010 (c. 15))
Recess Elections Act 1975	1975 c. 66	12 November 1975
An Act to consolidate the enactments relating to the issue of warrants for by-elections when the House of Commons is in recess, and to repeal, as unnecessary, section 106(2) of the Bankruptcy Act 1914. (Note: Bankruptcy Act 1914 (4 & 5 Geo. 5. c. 59))
Housing Finance (Special Provisions) Act 1975 (repealed)	1975 c. 67	12 November 1975
An Act to prevent surcharges under the Local Government Act 1933 (Note: Local Government Act 1933 (23 & 24 Geo. 5. c. 51)) arising out of the Housing Finance Act 1972; (Note: Housing Finance Act 1972 (c. 47)) to substitute other means of making good losses or deficiencies in respect of which such surcharges would fall to be made; and for connected purposes. (Repealed by Housing (Consequential Provisions) Act 1985 (c. 71))
Industry Act 1975	1975 c. 68	12 November 1975
An Act to establish a National Enterprise Board; to confer on the Secretary of State power to prohibit the passing to persons not resident in the United Kingdom of control of undertakings engaged in manufacturing industry, and power to acquire compulsorily the capital or assets of such undertakings where control has passed to such persons or there is a probability that it will pass; to amend the Industry Act 1972 (Note: Industry Act 1972 (c. 63)) and the Development of Inventions Act 1967; (Note: Development of Inventions Act 1967 (c. 32)) to make provision for the disclosure of information relating to manufacturing undertakings to the Secretary of State or the Minister of Agriculture, Fisheries and Food, and to trade unions; and for connected purposes.
Scottish Development Agency Act 1975	1975 c. 69	12 November 1975
An Act to establish a Scottish Development Agency; to provide for the appointment by the Secretary of State of a Scottish Industrial Development Advisory Board; to make provision for assistance in connection with air services serving the Highlands and Islands; and for connected purposes.
Welsh Development Agency Act 1975	1975 c. 70	12 November 1975
An Act to establish a Welsh Development Agency and a Welsh Industrial Development Advisory Board; and for connected purposes.
Employment Protection Act 1975	1975 c. 71	12 November 1975
An Act to establish machinery for promoting the improvement of industrial relations; to amend the law relating to workers' rights and otherwise to amend the law relating to workers, employers, trade unions and employers' associations; to provide for the establishment and operation of a Maternity Pay Fund; to provide for the extension of the jurisdiction of industrial tribunals; to amend the law relating to entitlement to and recoupment of unemployment benefit and supplementary benefit; to amend the Employment Agencies Act 1973 (Note: Employment Agencies Act 1973 (c. 35)) as respects the exercise of licensing functions under that Act; to amend the Employment and Training Act 1973 (Note: Employment and Training Act 1973 (c. 50)) as respects the status of bodies established, and the powers of the Secretary of State, under that Act; to amend the Health and Safety at Work etc. Act 1974 (Note: Health and Safety at Work etc. Act 1974 (c. 37)) as respects the appointment of safety representatives, health and safety at work in agriculture, the status of bodies established and the disclosure of information obtained under that Act; to provide for the extension of employment legislation to certain parliamentary staff and to certain areas outside Great Britain; and for connected purposes.
Children Act 1975	1975 c. 72	12 November 1975
An Act to make further provision for children.
Cinematograph Films Act 1975	1975 c. 73	12 November 1975
An Act to make provision for payments by the British Film Fund Agency to the National Film Finance Corporation and for the application of those payments by that Corporation.
Petroleum and Submarine Pipe-lines Act 1975 (repealed)	1975 c. 74	12 November 1975
An Act to establish the British National Oil Corporation and make provision with respect to the functions of the Corporation; to make further provision about licences to search for and get petroleum and about submarine pipe-lines and refineries; to authorise loans and guarantees in connection with the development of the petroleum resources of the United Kingdom and payments in respect of certain guarantees and loans by the Bank of England; and for purposes connected with the matters aforesaid. (Repealed by Petroleum Act 1998 (c. 17))
Policyholders Protection Act 1975 (repealed)	1975 c. 75	12 November 1975
An Act to make provision for indemnifying (in whole or in part) or otherwise assisting or protecting policyholders and others who have been or may be prejudiced in consequence of the inability of authorised insurance companies carrying on business in the United Kingdom to meet their liabilities under policies issued or securities given by them, and for imposing levies on the insurance industry for the purpose; to authorise the disclosure of certain documents and information to persons appointed by the Secretary of State to advise him on the exercise of his powers under the Insurance Companies Act 1974; (Note: Insurance Companies Act 1974 (c. 49)) and for purposes connected with the matters aforesaid. (Repealed by Financial Services and Markets Act 2000 (Consequential Amendments and Repeals) Order 2001 (SI 2001/3649))
Local Land Charges Act 1975	1975 c. 76	12 November 1975
An Act to make fresh provision for and in connection with the keeping of local land charges registers and the registration of matters therein.
Community Land Act 1975	1975 c. 77	12 November 1975
An Act to enable local authorities and certain other authorities to acquire, manage and deal with land suitable for development, and to make other provision for and in connection with the public ownership of land; to amend planning law and the rules for assessing the value of land for compulsory acquisition and other cases where compensation is payable; to make provision concerning unoccupied office premises; and to establish a Land Authority for Wales.
Airports Authority Act 1975 (repealed)	1975 c. 78	12 November 1975
An Act to consolidate the Airports Authority Act 1965 (Note: Airports Authority Act 1965 (c. 16)) and certain related enactments. (Repealed by Airports Act 1986 (c. 31))
Consolidated Fund (No. 3) Act 1975	1975 c. 79	19 December 1975
An Act to apply certain sums out of the Consolidated Fund to the service of the years ending on 31st March 1976 and 1977.
OECD Support Fund Act 1975	1975 c. 80	19 December 1975
An Act to enable effect to be given to an international agreement establishing a financial support fund of the Organisation for Economic Co-operation and Development.
Moneylenders (Crown Agents) Act 1975	1975 c. 81	19 December 1975
An Act to make provision as to the application to the Crown Agents for Oversea Governments and Administrations, and bodies corporate wholly owned by them, of the Moneylenders Acts 1900 to 1927 and the Moneylenders Acts (Northern Ireland) 1900 to 1969.
Civil List Act 1975 (repealed)	1975 c. 82	19 December 1975
An Act to provide for supplementing out of moneys provided by Parliament the sums payable under the enactments mentioned in section 6(1) of the Civil List Act 1972; (Note: Civil List Act 1972 (c. 7)) and to repeal section 5(2)(b) of that Act. (Repealed by Sovereign Grant Act 2011 (c. 15))
Northern Ireland (Loans) Act 1975	1975 c. 83	19 December 1975
An Act to make further provision with regard to the making of loans to the Consolidated Fund of Northern Ireland.

== Local acts ==
Short title	Citation	Royal assent
Long title
British Railways Act 1975	1975 c. i	13 March 1975
An Act to empower the British Railways Board and the Greater Manchester Passenger Transport Executive to construct works and to acquire lands; to extend the time for the compulsory purchase of certain lands; to confer further powers on the Board, the Executive, Cleveland Potash Limited and the National Coal Board; and for other purposes.
Pier and Harbour Order (Fishguard and Goodwick Harbour) Confirmation Act 1975	1975 c. ii	20 March 1975
An Act to confirm a Provisional Order made by the Secretary of State for the Environment under the General Pier and Harbour Act 1861 (Note: General Pier and Harbour Act 1861 (24 & 25 Vict. c. 45)) relating to Fishguard and Goodwick Harbour.
	Fishguard and Goodwick Harbour Order 1974 (Note: Although passed in 1975, the short title specifies the year 1974.) Provisional Order to authorise the Preseli District Council to levy certain dues and charges in respect of the Fishguard Harbour; to modify the application of certain provisions of the Harbours Clauses Act 1847; (Note: Harbours, Docks and Piers Clauses Act 1847 (10 & 11 Vict. c. 27)) and for other purposes.	
Queen's Road Brighton Burial Ground Act 1975	1975 c. iii	8 May 1975
An Act to provide for the removal of restrictions attaching to the Queen's Road Burial Ground in the borough of Brighton; to authorise the use thereof for other purposes; and for purposes incidental thereto.
Standard and Chartered Bank Act 1975	1975 c. iv	8 May 1975
An Act to provide for the transfer to Standard and Chartered Banking Group Limited of parts of the undertakings of The Standard Bank Limited and The Chartered Bank; and for other purposes.
Ocean Transport and Trading (Delivery Warrants) Act 1975	1975 c. v	8 May 1975
An Act to enable Ocean Transport & Trading Limited, Panocean Shipping & Terminals Limited, Overseas Containers Limited and Arbuthnot Storage Limited and their subsidiary companies to issue transferable certificates and warrants for the delivery of goods; and for other purposes.
Commonwealth Portland Cement Company, Limited Act 1975	1975 c. vi	8 May 1975
An Act to make provision for the transfer to the State of New South Wales in the Commonwealth of Australia of the registered office of The Commonwealth Portland Cement Company, Limited; for the cesser of application to that company of provisions of the Companies Acts 1948 to 1967; and for other purposes incidental thereto.
Scrabster Harbour Order Confirmation Act 1975	1975 c. vii	22 May 1975
An Act to confirm a Provisional Order under the Private Legislation Procedure (Scotland) Act 1936, (Note: Private Legislation Procedure (Scotland) Act 1936 (26 Geo. 5 & 1 Edw. 8. c. 52)) relating to Scrabster Harbour.
	Scrabster Harbour Order 1975 Provisional Order to authorise the Trustees of the Harbour of Scrabster to carry out works for the improvement of their harbour undertaking and to increase their power to borrow money; and for other purposes.	
Stornoway Trust Order Confirmation Act 1975	1975 c. viii	22 May 1975
An Act to confirm a Provisional Order under the Private Legislation Procedure (Scotland) Act 1936, relating to Stornoway Trust.
	Stornoway Trust Order 1975 Provisional Order to make provision for the amalgamation of the Stornoway Trust and the Lews Castle Trust to form one trust; to incorporate the trustees of the said trust; to make provision for the vesting of the trust property in the corporate body; to make provision with respect to the election of trustees; to amend the Stornoway Deed of Trust; and for other purposes.	
London Transport (Additional Powers) Act 1975 (repealed)	1975 c. ix	22 May 1975
An Act to confer further powers on the London Transport Executive in relation to manufacture, repair and supply; and for other purposes. (Repealed by London Regional Transport Act 1984)
United Dominions Trust Act 1975	1975 c. x	22 May 1975
An Act to provide for the transfer to United Dominions Trust Limited of the banking business of UDT Securities Limited and UDT Finance Limited; and for other purposes.
Merseyside Metropolitan Railway Act 1975	1975 c. xi	22 May 1975
An Act to empower the Merseyside Passenger Transport Executive and the British Railways Board to construct works and to acquire lands; and for other purposes.
Corn Exchange Act 1975	1975 c. xii	22 May 1975
An Act to provide for the alteration of the share capital, the extension of the objects and powers and otherwise to increase the powers of The Corn Exchange Company Limited; and for other purposes.
Fraserburgh Harbour Order Confirmation Act 1975 (repealed)	1975 c. xiii	3 July 1975
An Act to confirm a Provisional Order under the Private Legislation Procedure (Scotland) Act 1936, relating to Fraserburgh Harbour. (Repealed by Fraserburgh Harbour Revision (Constitution) Order 2001 (SSI 2001/457))
	Fraserburgh Harbour Order 1975 Provisional Order to authorise the Fraserburgh Harbour Commissioners to acquire lands and to carry out works for the improvement of Fraserburgh Harbour and to borrow money; and for other purposes.	
Friends' Provident Life Office Act 1975	1975 c. xiv	3 July 1975
An Act to provide for the control and management of the Friends' Provident Life Office; and for other purposes.
Sheffield City Council Act 1975 (repealed)	1975 c. xv	3 July 1975
An Act to confer further powers on the Council of the city of Sheffield in relation to private hire vehicles; and for other purposes. (Repealed by City of Sheffield (Local Act Repeal) Order 1978 (SI 1978/316))
Scottish Transport Group (Port Ellen Harbour) Order Confirmation Act 1975	1975 c. xvi	1 August 1975
An Act to confirm a Provisional Order under the Private Legislation Procedure (Scotland) Act 1936, relating to Scottish Transport Group (Port Ellen Harbour).
	Scottish Transport Group (Port Ellen Harbour) Order 1975 Provisional Order to confer powers on the Scottish Transport Group with respect to the harbour of Port Ellen; and for purposes connected therewith.	
Dundee Harbour Order Confirmation Act 1975	1975 c. xvii	1 August 1975
An Act to confirm a Provisional Order under the Private Legislation Procedure (Scotland) Act 1936, relating to Dundee Harbour.
	Dundee Harbour Order 1975 Provisional Order to make further provision as to the general duties and powers of the Dundee Harbour Trustees; to authorise the levying of certain charges at the harbour of Dundee; to increase the borrowing powers of the Trustees and to make provision for a reserve fund; and for other purposes.	
Dundee Port Authority Order Confirmation Act 1975	1975 c. xviii	1 August 1975
An Act to confirm a Provisional Order under the Private Legislation Procedure (Scotland) Act 1936, relating to Dundee Port Authority.
	Dundee Port Authority Order 1975 Provisional Order to reconstitute the Trustees of the harbour of Dundee and to change their name; and for other purposes.	
British Transport Docks Act 1975	1975 c. xix	1 August 1975
An Act to extend the time for the compulsory purchase of certain lands; and for other purposes.
Plymouth City Council Act 1975	1975 c. xx	1 August 1975
An Act to confer further powers on the Council of the city of Plymouth in relation to hackney carriages and private hire vehicles; and for other purposes.
Westminster Abbey Act 1975	1975 c. xxi	1 August 1975
An Act to provide for the pooling of investments and moneys of certain funds of or connected with Westminster Abbey; to make better provision for the investment of those funds; and for other purposes.
Dart Harbour and Navigation Authority Act 1975	1975 c. xxii	1 August 1975
An Act to constitute and incorporate the Dart Harbour and Navigation Authority and to amalgamate under the jurisdiction of that Authority the undertakings of the Dartmouth Harbour Commissioners and the River Dart Navigation Commissioners; to confer upon the Authority powers and duties in relation to the amalgamated undertakings; and for other purposes.
British Waterways Act 1975	1975 c. xxiii	1 August 1975
An Act to confer further powers on the British Waterways Board and make further provision for the control and regulation of the Board's waterways; and for other purposes.
McDermott Scotland Order Confirmation Act 1975 (repealed)	1975 c. xxiv	7 August 1975
An Act to confirm a Provisional Order under the Private Legislation Procedure (Scotland) Act 1936, relating to McDermott Scotland. (Repealed by Whiteness Marina Harbour Revision Order 2008 (SSI 2008/361) )
	McDermott Scotland Order 1975 Provisional Order to authorise Oceanic Contractors Incorporated to exercise harbour jurisdiction at Whiteness Head in the area of the Carse of Ardersier in the Highland Region and to construct works; and for other purposes.	
Lerwick Harbour (Miscellaneous Provisions) Order Confirmation Act 1975	1975 c. xxv	7 August 1975
An Act to confirm a Provisional Order under the Private Legislation Procedure (Scotland) Act 1936, relating to Lerwick Harbour (Miscellaneous Provisions).
	Lerwick Harbour (Miscellaneous Provisions) Order 1975 Provisional Order to amend certain provisions of the Lerwick Harbour Act 1877 (Note: Lerwick Harbour Improvements Act 1877 (40 & 41 Vict. c. cxciv)) and the Lerwick Harbour Order 1973; to make provision with respect to the application to the Trustees of the Port and Harbour of Lerwick of certain provisions of the Local Government (Scotland) Act 1973; (Note: Local Government (Scotland) Act 1973 (c. 65)) to extend the limits of the harbour and for other purposes.	
Greater Glasgow Passenger Transport Order Confirmation Act 1975	1975 c. xxvi	7 August 1975
An Act to confirm a Provisional Order under the Private Legislation Procedure (Scotland) Act 1936, relating to the Greater Glasgow Passenger Transport Executive.
	Greater Glasgow Passenger Transport Order 1975 Provisional Order to empower the Greater Glasgow Passenger Transport Executive to construct works and to acquire lands; and for other purposes.	
Greater London Council (Money) Act 1975	1975 c. xxvii	7 August 1975
An Act to regulate the expenditure on capital account and on lending to other persons by the Greater London Council during the financial period from 1st April 1975 to 30th September 1976; and for other purposes.
Milford Haven Conservancy Act 1975 (repealed)	1975 c. xxviii	7 August 1975
An Act to confer further powers and duties on the Milford Haven Conservancy Board; to amend the Milford Haven Conservancy Act 1958; (Note: Milford Haven Conservancy Act 1958 (6 & 7 Eliz. 2. c. 23)) and for other purposes. (Repealed by Milford Haven Conservancy Act 1983 (c. xix))
British Railways (No. 2) Act 1975	1975 c. xxix	7 August 1975
An Act to empower the British Railways Board to construct works and to acquire lands; to confer further powers on the Board and the Trinity House; and for other purposes.
Greater London Council (General Powers) Act 1975	1975 c. xxx	7 August 1975
An Act to confer further powers upon the Greater London Council and other authorities; and for other purposes.
London Transport Act 1975	1975 c. xxxi	7 August 1975
An Act to empower the London Transport Executive to construct works and to acquire lands; to extend the time for the compulsory purchase of certain lands; to confer further powers on the Executive; and for other purposes.
Port Askaig Pier Order Confirmation Act 1975	1975 c. xxxii	12 November 1975
An Act to confirm a Provisional Order under the Private Legislation Procedure (Scotland) Act 1936, relating to Port Askaig Pier.
	Port Askaig Pier Order 1975 Provisional Order to authorise the Strathclyde Regional Council to acquire lands and to carry out works for the improvement of Port Askaig Pier and to borrow money; and for other purposes.	
Mallaig Harbour Order Confirmation Act 1975	1975 c. xxxiii	12 November 1975
An Act to confirm a Provisional Order under the Private Legislation Procedure (Scotland) Act 1936, relating to Mallaig Harbour.
	Mallaig Harbour Order 1975 Provisional Order to authorise the Mallaig Harbour Authority to carry out works for the improvement of the harbour of Mallaig and to borrow money; and for other purposes.	
Royal College of Surgeons of Edinburgh Order Confirmation Act 1975	1975 c. xxxiv	12 November 1975
An Act to confirm a Provisional Order under the Private Legislation Procedure (Scotland) Act 1936, relating to the Royal College of Surgeons of Edinburgh.
	Royal College of Surgeons of Edinburgh Order 1975 Provisional Order to enable Her Majesty to grant a new Charter to the Royal College of Surgeons of Edinburgh; and for purposes in connection therewith.	
Brookwood Cemetery Act 1975	1975 c. xxxv	12 November 1975
An Act to empower Brookwood Cemetery Limited to dispose of certain lands belonging to the said Company not required for cemetery purposes free from restrictions; to confer powers on the Company with respect to agreements with local authorities and others; and for other purposes.
Shard Bridge Act 1975	1975 c. xxxvi	12 November 1975
An Act to amend and repeal certain provisions of the Shard Bridge Act 1862; to confer new powers on the Shard Bridge Company; and for other purposes.

== Personal act ==
Short title	Citation	Royal assent
Long title
James Hugh Maxwell (Naturalisation) Act 1975	1975 c. 1	3 July 1975
An Act to naturalise James Hugh Maxwell as a British subject and a citizen of the United Kingdom and Colonies.

== See also ==
- List of acts of the Parliament of the United Kingdom
