= Dangerous Drugs Act =

Dangerous Drugs Act may refer to:

- Dangerous Drugs Act 1920 (10 & 11 Geo. 5. c. 46), a United Kingdom law
- Dangerous Drugs Act 1925 (15 & 16 Geo. 5. c. 74), a United Kingdom law
- Dangerous Drugs Act 1951 (14 & 15 Geo. 6. c. 48), a United Kingdom law
- Dangerous Drugs Act 1952, a Malaysian law
- Dangerous Drugs Act 1965 (c. 15), a United Kingdom law
- Dangerous Drugs Act 1967 (c. 82), a United Kingdom law
- Comprehensive Dangerous Drugs Act of 2002 (Republic Act No. 9165), Philippines law
