= List of acts of the Parliament of the United Kingdom from 1965 =

This is a list of acts of the Parliament of the United Kingdom passed in 1965.

Acts passed since 1963 are cited by calendar year, as opposed to the convention used for earlier acts of citing the regnal year(s) in which the relevant parliamentary session was held. Each act passed in a respective year is given a chapter number (abbreviated "c."), denoted by Arabic numerals in the case of public general acts, lowercase Roman numerals in the case of local acts, or italicised Arabic numerals in the case of personal acts. These run as separate series.

130 acts of Parliament were passed in 1965: 83 public general acts and 47 local acts.

indicates that an act has been transcribed on Wikisource, indicates that an act is available to view at legislation.gov.uk, and indicates the location of the original act in the Parliamentary Archives.

== Public general acts ==
Short title	Citation	Royal assent
Long title
Consolidated Fund Act 1965 (repealed)	1965 c. 1	4 February 1965
An Act to apply a sum out of the Consolidated Fund to the service of the year ending on 31st March 1965. (Repealed by Statute Law (Repeals) Act 1971 (c. 52))
Administration of Justice Act 1965	1965 c. 2	23 March 1965
An Act to enable common investment funds to be established for the investment of moneys in certain courts in England, Wales and Northern Ireland and certain other moneys; to make fresh provision for dealing with funds in the Supreme Court of Judicature (Note: Although the term "Supreme Court of Judicature" was amended to "Senior Courts" in each place it occurs in the act by the Constitutional Reform Act 2005 (c. 4) on 1 October 2009, the long title was exempted from amendment.) in England and to amend the law concerning dealing with funds in county courts in England and Wales or in the Mayor's and City of London Court; to amend the law concerning giving security by way of making a deposit with the Accountant General of the Supreme Court of Judicature in England; to make miscellaneous amendments of the law relating to that court and to inferior courts in England and Wales; to amend section 8 of the Prosecution of Offences Act 1879; (Note: Prosecution of Offences Act 1879 (42 & 43 Vict. c. 22)) to enable benefits under section 10 of the Courts of Justice Concentration (Site) Act 1865 (Note: Courts of Justice Concentration (Site) Act 1865 (28 & 29 Vict. c. 49)) to be commuted into capital sums; to amend the War Pensions (Administrative Provisions) Act 1919; (Note: War Pensions (Administrative Provisions) Act 1919 (9 & 10 Geo. 5. c. 53)) to enlarge the legislative power of the Parliament of Northern Ireland and amend the Criminal Appeal (Northern Ireland) Act 1930; (Note: Criminal Appeal (Northern Ireland) Act 1930 (20 & 21 Geo. 5. c. 45)) to repeal certain obsolete, spent, unnecessary or superseded enactments; and for purposes connected with the matters aforesaid.
Remuneration of Teachers Act 1965	1965 c. 3	23 March 1965
An Act to make new provision for determining the remuneration of teachers; and for purposes connected therewith.
Science and Technology Act 1965	1965 c. 4	23 March 1965
An Act to make further provision with respect to the responsibility and powers in relation to scientific research and related matters of the Secretary of State, the Minister of Technology and certain chartered bodies and other organisations, and for purposes connected therewith.
Kenya Republic Act 1965	1965 c. 5	23 March 1965
An Act to make provision as to the operation of the law in relation to Kenya as a Republic within the Commonwealth.
Nuclear Installations (Amendment) Act 1965 (repealed)	1965 c. 6	23 March 1965
An Act to make new provision in place of or amend certain provisions of the Nuclear Installations (Licensing and Insurance) Act 1959 (Note: Nuclear Installations (Licensing and Insurance) Act 1959 (7 & 8 Eliz. 2. c. 46)) so as to give effect to certain international agreements; to make other amendments to that Act; and for connected purposes. (Repealed by Nuclear Installations Act 1965 (c. 57) and Electricity Act 1989 (c. 29))
Education (Scotland) Act 1965 (repealed)	1965 c. 7	23 March 1965
An Act to amend paragraph 20 of Schedule 3 to the Education (Scotland) Act 1962 (Note: Education (Scotland) Act 1962 (10 & 11 Eliz. 2. c. 47)) to enable provision to be made for the payment of pensions to the widows or other dependants of teachers who die without having completed ten years' service. (Repealed by Teachers Superannuation Act 1968 (c. 12))
Consolidated Fund (No. 2) Act 1965 (repealed)	1965 c. 8	29 March 1965
An Act to apply certain sums out of the Consolidated Fund to the service of the years ending on 31st March 1964, 1965 and 1966. (Repealed by Statute Law (Repeals) Act 1971 (c. 52))
Armed Forces (Housing Loans) Act 1965	1965 c. 9	29 March 1965
An Act to amend the Armed Forces (Housing Loans) Acts of 1949 (Note: Armed Forces (Housing Loans) Act 1949 (12, 13 & 14 Geo. 6. c. 77)) and 1958. (Note: Armed Forces (Housing Loans) Act 1958 (7 & 8 Eliz. 2. c. 1))
Superannuation (Amendment) Act 1965 (repealed)	1965 c. 10	29 March 1965
An Act to amend the law relating to the superannuation and other benefits payable to or in respect of civil servants, including members of Her Majesty's diplomatic service, and to provide for certain other matters connected with the establishment of that service, to amend the law relating to such benefits payable to or in respect of persons employed in more than one public office, to amend the provisions of the Administration of Justice (Pensions) Act 1950 (Note: Administration of Justice (Pensions) Act 1950 (14 & 15 Geo. 6. c. 11)) relating to pensions payable for children, and to authorise the winding up of the National Insurance (Existing Pensioners) Fund. (Repealed by Statute Law (Repeals) Act 1989 (c. 43))
Ministerial Salaries and Members' Pensions Act 1965 (repealed)	1965 c. 11	29 March 1965
An Act to prescribe new rates of salary for Ministers of the Crown, for the Leader of the Opposition in the House of Commons, and for Mr. Speaker; to authorise the payment of salary to the Leader of the Opposition in the House of Lords and the Chief Opposition Whips in both Houses; to establish a contributory pensions scheme for Members of the House of Commons; to make further provision with respect to the pensions of Prime Ministers; and for purposes connected with the matters aforesaid. (Repealed by Parliamentary and other Pensions Act 1972 (c. 48))
Industrial and Provident Societies Act 1965 or the Co-operative and Community Benefit Societies and Credit Unions Act 1965 (repealed)	1965 c. 12	2 June 1965
An Act to consolidate certain enactments relating to industrial and provident societies, being those enactments as they apply in Great Britain and the Channel Islands with corrections and improvements made under the Consolidation of Enactments (Procedure) Act 1949. (Note: Consolidation of Enactments (Procedure) Act 1949 (12, 13 & 14 Geo. 6. c. 33)) (Repealed by Co-operative and Community Benefit Societies Act 2014 (c. 14))
Rivers (Prevention of Pollution) (Scotland) Act 1965 (repealed)	1965 c. 13	2 June 1965
An Act to make further provision for maintaining or restoring the cleanliness of the rivers and other inland waters and of the tidal waters of Scotland; to amend the Rivers (Prevention of Pollution) (Scotland) Act 1951; and for purposes connected with the matters aforesaid. (Repealed by Water Environment (Consequential and Savings Provisions) (Scotland) Order 2006 (SSI 2006/181))
Cereals Marketing Act 1965 (repealed)	1965 c. 14	2 June 1965
An Act to provide for the establishment of a Home-Grown Cereals Authority, and to make provision as to the functions and finances of the Authority; and for purposes connected therewith. (Repealed by Agriculture and Horticulture Development Board Order 2008 (SI 2008/576))
Dangerous Drugs Act 1965 (repealed)	1965 c. 15	2 June 1965
An Act to consolidate the Dangerous Drugs Acts 1951 (Note: Dangerous Drugs Act 1951 (14 & 15 Geo. 6. c. 48)) and 1964. (Note: Dangerous Drugs Act 1964 (c. 36)) (Repealed by Misuse of Drugs Act 1971 (c. 38))
Airports Authority Act 1965 (repealed)	1965 c. 16	2 June 1965
An Act to provide for the establishment of a public authority with functions including the operation of aerodromes, for the transfer of certain aerodromes from the Minister of Aviation to the authority and for matters relating to the authority and its functions. (Repealed by Airports Authority Act 1975 (c. 78))
Museum of London Act 1965	1965 c. 17	2 June 1965
An Act to establish a Board of Governors of the Museum of London; to transfer to them the collections of the London Museum and of the Guildhall Museum and the benefit of certain funds; to define the functions of that Board, and to provide for purposes connected with the matters aforesaid.
War Damage Act 1965	1965 c. 18	2 June 1965
An Act to abolish rights at common law to compensation in respect of damage to, or destruction of, property effected by, or on the authority of, the Crown during, or in contemplation of the outbreak of, war.
Teaching Council (Scotland) Act 1965 (repealed)	1965 c. 19	2 June 1965
An Act to provide for the establishment in Scotland of a Teaching Council; to provide for the registration of teachers, for regulating their professional training and for cancelling registration in cases of misconduct; and for purposes connected with the matters aforesaid. (Repealed by Public Services Reform (General Teaching Council for Scotland) Order 2011 (SSI 2011/215))
Criminal Evidence Act 1965 (repealed)	1965 c. 20	2 June 1965
An Act to make certain trade or business records admissible as evidence in criminal proceedings. (Repealed by Prisoners and Criminal Proceedings (Scotland) Act 1993 (c. 9))
Development of Inventions Act 1965 (repealed)	1965 c. 21	2 June 1965
An Act to amend the Development of Inventions Acts 1948 to 1958. (Repealed by Development of Inventions Act 1967 (c. 32))
Law Commissions Act 1965	1965 c. 22	15 June 1965
An Act to provide for the constitution of Commissions for the reform of the law.
Appropriation Act 1965 (repealed)	1965 c. 23	5 August 1965
An Act to apply a sum out of the Consolidated Fund to the service of the year ending on 31st March 1966, and to appropriate the supplies granted in this Session of Parliament. (Repealed by Statute Law (Repeals) Act 1971 (c. 52))
Severn Bridge Tolls Act 1965	1965 c. 24	5 August 1965
An Act to empower the Minister of Transport to levy tolls in respect of the use of a new road which crosses the Rivers Severn and Wye; to enable that Minister, in relation to that new road, to impose prohibitions, restrictions and other requirements for the purpose of preventing obstruction and for the protection of property and otherwise; to provide for the extinguishment of any franchise to operate a ferry across the River Severn in the vicinity of the new road, and to enable compensation to be paid to persons operating any such ferry; and for purposes connected with the matters aforesaid.
Finance Act 1965	1965 c. 25	5 August 1965
An Act to grant certain duties, to alter other duties, and to amend the law relating to the National Debt and the Public Revenue, and to make further provision in connection with Finance.
Criminal Justice Act 1965 (repealed)	1965 c. 26	5 August 1965
An Act to make as regards England and Wales further provision for the continuation of criminal trials notwithstanding the death or discharge of a juror. (Repealed by Juries Act 1974 (c. 23))
Lost Property (Scotland) Act 1965 (repealed)	1965 c. 27	5 August 1965
An Act to extend the application of section 412 of the Burgh Police (Scotland) Act 1892 (Note: Burgh Police (Scotland) Act 1892 (55 & 56 Vict. c. 55)) to landward areas of counties in Scotland and to provide for the sale or disposal of lost and unclaimed perishable articles. (Repealed by Statute Law (Repeals) Act 1976 (c. 16))
Justices of the Peace Act 1965 (repealed)	1965 c. 28	5 August 1965
An Act to amend section 20 of the Justices of the Peace Act 1949, and for connected purposes. (Repealed by Justices of the Peace Act 1979 (c. 55))
Solicitors (Scotland) Act 1965 (repealed)	1965 c. 29	5 August 1965
An Act to amend the law relating to solicitors in Scotland, and for purposes connected therewith. (Repealed by Solicitors (Scotland) Act 1980 (c. 46))
Highways (Amendment) Act 1965 (repealed)	1965 c. 30	5 August 1965
An Act to amend the procedure for enforcing the duty imposed on highway authorities and other persons by section 129 of the Highways Act 1959. (Note: Highways Act 1959 (7 & 8 Eliz. 2. c. 25)) (Repealed by Highways Act 1980 (c. 66))
Solicitors Act 1965 (repealed)	1965 c. 31	5 August 1965
An Act to extend the powers of The Law Society in relation to property in the control or possession of certain solicitors and other persons, including the distribution of clients' money; to enable grants to be made out of the Compensation Fund established under the Solicitors Act 1957 (Note: Solicitors Act 1957 (5 & 6 Eliz. 2. c. 27)) in additional circumstances and to provide for an additional payment into that Fund by solicitors; to confer further powers upon The Law Society to make regulations with respect to the education and training of persons seeking admission as solicitors; to make provision with regard to interest on clients' money; to amend the provisions of the said Act of 1957 relating to the admission of overseas solicitors, the applying for and issue of practising certificates and the application of fees payable thereon, accountants' certificates, the employment by solicitors of certain persons, proceedings before the disciplinary committee and appeals therefrom, restoration to the roll, the authentication of documents and local law societies; to provide for the revision of certain fees payable to The Law Society and certain penalties and for the recovery of moneys in certain cases; and for purposes connected with the matters aforesaid. (Repealed by Solicitors Act 1974 (c. 47))
Administration of Estates (Small Payments) Act 1965	1965 c. 32	5 August 1965
An Act to provide for increasing the limits in enactments and instruments which allow property to be disposed of on death without probate or other proof of title, or in pursuance of a nomination made by the deceased; to extend certain of the said enactments relating to an intestate's property to cases where the deceased leaves a will; and for connected purposes.
Control of Office and Industrial Development Act 1965 (repealed)	1965 c. 33	5 August 1965
An Act to impose further restrictions (with retrospective effect, in the case of land in the metropolitan region) on the development of land in so far as any such development may relate to office premises; to provide, in relation to industrial development, for modifying the exemptions conferred in England and Wales by section 39 of the Town and Country Planning Act 1962 (Note: Town and Country Planning Act 1962 (10 & 11 Eliz. 2. c. 38)) and in Scotland by section 19 of the Local Employment Act 1960; (Note: Local Employment Act 1960 (8 & 9 Eliz. 2. c. 18)) and for purposes connected with the matters aforesaid. (Repealed for Scotland by Town and Country Planning (Scotland) Act 1972 (c. 52) and for England and Wales by Statute Law (Repeals) Act 1986 (c. 12))
British Nationality Act 1965 (repealed)	1965 c. 34	5 August 1965
An Act to provide for the acquisition of the status of British subject by alien women who have been married to persons being British subjects without citizenship by virtue of section 13 or 16 of the British Nationality Act 1948 (Note: British Nationality Act 1948 (11 & 12 Geo. 6. c. 56)) or British subjects by virtue of section 2 of that Act, and for purposes connected with the matter aforesaid. (Repealed by British Nationality Act 1981 (c. 61))
Shops (Early Closing Days) Act 1965 (repealed)	1965 c. 35	5 August 1965
An Act to provide for a shop's early closing day to be selected by its occupier; to abolish the power to change the closing time on early closing days and the power to extend early closing day requirements to exempted shops; to substitute the expression "early closing day" for the expression "weekly half-holiday" in the Shops Act 1950; (Note: Shops Act 1950 (14 Geo. 6. c. 28)) and for purposes connected with the matters aforesaid. (Repealed by Deregulation and Contracting Out Act 1994 (c. 40))
Gas Act 1965	1965 c. 36	5 August 1965
An Act to confer additional functions on the Gas Council and to make further provision as to the rating of the Gas Council and Area Gas Boards; to increase the number of members of the Gas Council; to regulate and facilitate the storage of gas by the Council and those Boards in underground strata, and to modify section 52 of the Gas Act 1948; (Note: Gas Act 1948 (11 & 12 Geo. 6. c. 67)) and for connected purposes.
Carriage of Goods by Road Act 1965	1965 c. 37	5 August 1965
An Act to give effect to the Convention on the Contract for the International Carriage of Goods by Road signed at Geneva on 19th May 1956; and for purposes connected therewith.
Overseas Development and Service Act 1965 (repealed)	1965 c. 38	5 August 1965
An Act to amend the Colonial Development and Welfare Act 1959 (Note: Colonial Development and Welfare Act 1959 (7 & 8 Eliz. 2. c. 71)) and to authorise the Minister of Overseas Development to meet expenses incurred in connection with the employment of persons in overseas territories, or in respect of compensation paid to persons who are or have been so employed. (Repealed by Overseas Development and Co-operation Act 1980 (c. 63))
Criminal Procedure (Scotland) Act 1965	1965 c. 39	5 August 1965
An Act to amend the law of Scotland in relation to admissions and agreements in respect of evidence in trials on indictment, and for purposes connected therewith.
Housing (Amendment) (Scotland) Act 1965 (repealed)	1965 c. 40	5 August 1965
An Act to increase the limit of the aggregate amount of advances which may be made to the Scottish Special Housing Association under proviso (i) to section 18(1) of the Housing (Scotland) Act 1962. (Note: Housing (Scotland) Act 1962 (10 & 11 Eliz. 2. c. 28)) (Repealed by Housing (Financial Provisions) (Scotland) Act 1968 (c. 31))
Local Government (Scotland) Act 1947 (Amendment) Act 1965	1965 c. 41	5 August 1965
An Act to restrict the right to vote conferred on ex-officio members of local authorities by the provisions of section 330 of the Local Government (Scotland) Act 1947. (Note: Local Government (Scotland) Act 1947 (10 & 11 Geo. 6. c. 43))
Public Health (Notification of Births) Act 1965 (repealed)	1965 c. 42	5 August 1965
An Act to amend the enactments relating to the notification of births to medical officers of health. (Repealed for England and Wales by National Health Service Act 1977 (c. 49) and for Scotland and Northern Ireland by Statute Law (Repeals) Act 1993 (c. 50))
Statutory Orders (Special Procedure) Act 1965	1965 c. 43	5 August 1965
An Act to amend the Statutory Orders (Special Procedure) Act 1945 (Note: Statutory Orders (Special Procedure) Act 1945 (9 & 10 Geo. 6. c. 18)) so far as it relates to petitions under that Act, and to extend the period for moving a resolution to annul an order to which that Act applies.
Firearms Act 1965 (repealed)	1965 c. 44	5 August 1965
An Act to amend the law relating to firearms, imitation firearms and ammunition; and for connected purposes. (Repealed by Firearms Act 1968 (c. 27))
Backing of Warrants (Republic of Ireland) Act 1965 (repealed)	1965 c. 45	5 August 1965
An Act to make fresh provision for the execution in the United Kingdom, the Channel Islands and the Isle of Man of warrants of arrest issued in the Republic of Ireland; and to amend sections 27 and 29 of the Petty Sessions (Ireland) Act 1851 (Note: Petty Sessions (Ireland) Act 1851 (14 & 15 Vict. c. 93)) with respect to the endorsement in Ireland of warrants to which those sections apply. (Repealed by Extradition Act 2003 (c. 41))
Highlands and Islands Development (Scotland) Act 1965 (repealed)	1965 c. 46	5 August 1965
An Act to make further provision for the economic and social development of the Highlands and Islands of Scotland, and for purposes connected therewith. (Repealed by Enterprise and New Towns (Scotland) Act 1990 (c. 35))
Merchant Shipping Act 1965 (repealed)	1965 c. 47	5 August 1965
An Act to amend the law relating to the measurement of the tonnage of merchant ships and the marking of load lines. (Repealed by Merchant Shipping Act 1995 (c. 21))
Trade Disputes Act 1965 (repealed)	1965 c. 48	5 August 1965
An Act to prevent actions founded on tort, or of reparation, being brought in respect of certain acts done in contemplation or furtherance of trade disputes. (Repealed by Industrial Relations Act 1971 (c. 72))
Registration of Births, Deaths and Marriages (Scotland) Act 1965	1965 c. 49	5 August 1965
An Act to make new provision as respects the registration of births, deaths and marriages in Scotland, and as respects the recording of changes of name or surname there, and for purposes connected therewith.
Monopolies and Mergers Act 1965	1965 c. 50	5 August 1965
An Act to make further provision for the constitution and proceedings of the Monopolies Commission, for the matters dealt with by the Monopolies and Restrictive Practices (Inquiry and Control) Act 1948 (Note: Monopolies and Restrictive Practices (Inquiry and Control) Act 1948 (11 & 12 Geo. 6. c. 66)) and related matters and for preventing or remedying mischiefs that may result from mergers of businesses or similar transactions, and for purposes connected therewith.
National Insurance Act 1965 (repealed)	1965 c. 51	5 August 1965
An Act to consolidate the National Insurance Acts 1946 to 1964, certain provisions made by statutory instrument thereunder, and certain related enactments. (Repealed by Social Security (Consequential Provisions) Act 1975 (c. 18))
National Insurance (Industrial Injuries) Act 1965 (repealed)	1965 c. 52	5 August 1965
An Act to consolidate the National Insurance (Industrial Injuries) Acts 1946 to 1964 and certain related enactments. (Repealed by Social Security (Consequential Provisions) Act 1975 (c. 18))
Family Allowances Act 1965 (repealed)	1965 c. 53	5 August 1965
An Act to consolidate the Family Allowances Acts 1945 to 1964 and certain related enactments. (Repealed for England and Wales and Scotland by Child Benefit Act 1975 (c. 61))
National Health Service Contributions Act 1965 (repealed)	1965 c. 54	5 August 1965
An Act to consolidate the National Health Service Contributions Acts 1957 (Note: National Health Service Contributions Act 1957 (5 & 6 Eliz. 2. c. 34)) and 1961 (Note: National Health Service Contributions Act 1961 (9 & 10 Eliz. 2. c. 13)) and certain related enactments. (Repealed by Social Security Act 1973 (c. 38))
Statute Law Revision (Consequential Repeals) Act 1965	1965 c. 55	5 August 1965
An Act to repeal certain enactments in consequence of the coming into force of the National Insurance Act 1965 (c. 51), (Note: National Insurance Act 1965) the National Insurance (Industrial Injuries) Act 1965, (Note: National Insurance (Industrial Injuries) Act 1965 (c. 52)) the Family Allowances Act 1965 (Note: Family Allowances Act 1965 (c. 53)) and the National Health Service Contributions Act 1965. (Note: National Health Service Contributions Act 1965 (c. 54))
Compulsory Purchase Act 1965	1965 c. 56	5 August 1965
An Act to consolidate the Lands Clauses Acts as applied by Part I of Schedule 2 to the Acquisition of Land (Authorisation Procedure) Act 1946, (Note: Acquisition of Land (Authorisation Procedure) Act 1946 (9 & 10 Geo. 6. c. 49)) and by certain other enactments, and to repeal certain provisions in the Lands Clauses Acts and related enactments which have ceased to have any effect.
Nuclear Installations Act 1965	1965 c. 57	5 August 1965
An Act to consolidate the Nuclear Installations Acts 1959 and 1965. (Note: Nuclear Installations Act 1965 (c. 57))
Ministerial Salaries Consolidation Act 1965 (repealed)	1965 c. 58	5 August 1965
An Act to consolidate the enactments relating to the salaries of Ministers, the pensions of Prime Ministers, the salaries of Opposition Leaders and Chief Whips and other matters connected therewith. (Repealed by Parliamentary and other Pensions Act 1972 (c. 48))
New Towns Act 1965 (repealed)	1965 c. 59	5 August 1965
An Act to consolidate certain enactments relating to new towns and to matters connected therewith, being (except in the case of section 1(1) of the New Towns Act 1964) (Note: New Towns Act 1964 (c. 8)) those enactments in their application to England and Wales; with corrections and improvements made under the Consolidation of Enactments (Procedure) Act 1949. (Repealed by New Towns Act 1981 (c. 64))
Gas (Borrowing Powers) Act 1965 (repealed)	1965 c. 60	5 August 1965
An Act to increase the amount which may be borrowed by the Gas Council and Area Boards under the Gas Act 1948. (Repealed by Gas and Electricity Act 1968 (c. 39))
Judges' Remuneration Act 1965	1965 c. 61	5 August 1965
An Act to increase the salaries attached to certain high judicial offices; to increase the rate of the Lord Chancellor's pension; to provide for the appointment of additional judges of the High Court in England; and for connected purposes.
Redundancy Payments Act 1965 (repealed)	1965 c. 62	5 August 1965
An Act to provide for the making by employers of payments to employees in respect of redundancy; to establish a Redundancy Fund and to require employers to pay contributions towards that fund and to enable sums to be paid into that fund out of the Consolidated Fund; to provide for payments to be made out of the Redundancy Fund; to amend the Contracts of Employment Act 1963; (Note: Contracts of Employment Act 1963 (c. 49)) to extend the jurisdiction of tribunals established under the Industrial Training Act 1964 (Note: Industrial Training Act 1964 (c. 16)) and to make further provision as to procedure in relation to such tribunals; to enable certain statutory provisions relating to compensation to be modified in consequence of the provision for payments in respect of redundancy; and for purposes connected with the matters aforesaid. (Repealed by Statute Law (Repeals) Act 1989 (c. 43))
Public Works Loans Act 1965	1965 c. 63	5 August 1965
An Act to make further provision with respect to loans out of the Local Loans Fund; and for connected purposes.
Commons Registration Act 1965	1965 c. 64	5 August 1965
An Act to provide for the registration of common land and of town or village greens; to amend the law as to prescriptive claims to rights of common; and for purposes connected therewith.
International Monetary Fund Act 1965 (repealed)	1965 c. 65	5 August 1965
An Act to enable effect to be given to proposed increases in the quotas of the International Monetary Fund. (Repealed by National Loans Act 1968 (c. 13))
Hire-Purchase Act 1965 (repealed)	1965 c. 66	5 August 1965
An Act to consolidate certain enactments relating to hire-purchase, credit-sale and conditional sale agreements in England and Wales; with corrections and improvements made under the Consolidation of Enactments (Procedure) Act 1949. (Repealed by Consumer Credit Act 1974 (c. 39))
Hire-Purchase (Scotland) Act 1965 (repealed)	1965 c. 67	5 August 1965
An Act to consolidate certain enactments relating to hire-purchase, credit-sale and conditional sale agreements in Scotland. (Repealed by Consumer Credit Act 1974 (c. 39))
Salmon and Freshwater Fisheries Act 1965 (repealed)	1965 c. 68	5 August 1965
An Act to repeal and re-enact with amendments section 9 of the Salmon and Freshwater Fisheries Act 1923. (Note: Salmon and Freshwater Fisheries Act 1923 (13 & 14 Geo. 5. c. 16)) (Repealed by Salmon and Freshwater Fisheries Act 1975 (c. 51))
Criminal Procedure (Attendance of Witnesses) Act 1965	1965 c. 69	5 August 1965
An Act to make new provision for securing the attendance of witnesses in criminal proceedings before courts of assize and quarter sessions; to abolish the binding over of prosecutors for the purpose of such proceedings; to restrict the issue of subpoenas for securing the attendance of witnesses before magistrates' courts; and for connected purposes.
Honourable Lady Hylton-Foster's Annuity Act 1965 (repealed)	1965 c. 70	8 November 1965
An Act to settle and secure an annuity upon Audrey Pellew Hylton-Foster, commonly known as the Honourable Lady Hylton-Foster, in consideration of the eminent services of her late husband, the Right Honourable Sir Harry Braustyn Hylton Hylton-Foster. (Repealed by Statute Law (Repeals) Act 2004 (c. 14))
Murder (Abolition of Death Penalty) Act 1965	1965 c. 71	8 November 1965
An Act to abolish capital punishment in the case of persons convicted in Great Britain of murder or convicted of murder or a corresponding offence by court-martial and, in connection therewith, to make further provision for the punishment of persons so convicted.
Matrimonial Causes Act 1965	1965 c. 72	8 November 1965
An Act to consolidate certain enactments relating to matrimonial causes, maintenance and declarations of legitimacy and British nationality, with corrections and improvements made under the Consolidation of Enactments (Procedure) Act 1949.
Race Relations Act 1965	1965 c. 73	8 November 1965
An Act to prohibit discrimination on racial grounds in places of public resort; to prevent the enforcement or imposition on racial grounds of restrictions on the transfer of tenancies; to penalise incitement to racial hatred; and to amend section 5 of the Public Order Act 1936. (Note: Public Order Act 1936 (1 Edw. 8 & 1 Geo. 6. c. 6))
Superannuation Act 1965	1965 c. 74	8 November 1965
An Act to consolidate the Superannuation Acts 1834 to 1965 and certain other enactments relating to the superannuation of civil servants and other persons employed in the civil service of the State.
Rent Act 1965 (repealed)	1965 c. 75	8 November 1965
An Act to restore the right to retain possession of certain dwellings; to make further provision with respect to security of tenure, rents and premiums; to restrict evictions without due process of law; and for purposes connected with those matters. (Repealed for England and Wales by Protection from Eviction Act 1977 (c. 43) and for Scotland by Rent (Scotland) Act 1984 (c. 58))
Southern Rhodesia Act 1965	1965 c. 76	16 November 1965
An Act to make further provision with respect to Southern Rhodesia.
Expiring Laws Continuance Act 1965 (repealed)	1965 c. 77	22 December 1965
An Act to continue certain expiring laws. (Repealed by Statute Law (Repeals) Act 1971 (c. 52))
Pensions (Increase) Act 1965 (repealed)	1965 c. 78	22 December 1965
An Act to make provision with respect to increases or supplements in respect of certain pensions. (Repealed by Pensions (Increase) Act 1971 (c. 56))
Workmen's Compensation and Benefit (Amendment) Act 1965 (repealed)	1965 c. 79	22 December 1965
An Act to amend the law with respect to the supplementation of workmen's compensation and the provision of other benefit in respect of employment before 5th July 1948. (Repealed by Industrial Injuries and Diseases (Old Cases) Act 1967 (c. 34))
Rural Water Supplies and Sewerage Act 1965 (repealed)	1965 c. 80	22 December 1965
An Act to increase the limit on the contributions out of moneys provided by Parliament which may be made under section 1 of the Rural Water Supplies and Sewerage Act 1944. (Note: Rural Water Supplies and Sewerage Act 1944 (7 & 8 Geo. 6. c. 26)) (Repealed by Rural Water Supplies and Sewerage Act 1971 (c. 49))
Housing (Slum Clearance Compensation) Act 1965 (repealed)	1965 c. 81	22 December 1965
An Act to amend the provisions of Part II of Schedule 2 to the Housing Act 1957 (Note: Housing Act 1957 (5 & 6 Eliz. 2. c. 56)) relating to private dwellings. (Repealed by Housing (Consequential Provisions) Act 1985 (c. 71))
Coal Industry Act 1965	1965 c. 82	22 December 1965
An Act to make provision with respect to borrowing by, and loans by the Minister of Power to, the National Coal Board; with respect to the capital reconstruction, and the application of certain funds, of that Board; for the making of grants with the object of accelerating the redeployment of the manpower resources of that Board and the elimination of uneconomic colliery capacity; with respect to pensions or compensation for certain persons who have been members of that Board; and for connected purposes.
Teachers' Superannuation Act 1965 (repealed)	1965 c. 83	22 December 1965
An Act to amend the law relating to the superannuation and other benefits payable to or in respect of teachers and certain other persons employed in connection with the provision of educational services, and for purposes connected therewith. (Repealed by Teachers' Superannuation Act 1967 (c. 12))

== Local acts ==
Short title	Citation	Royal assent
Long title
Welsh Shipping Agency Act 1965	1965 c. i	23 March 1965
An Act to authorise Welsh Shipping Agency Limited to construct works and to acquire lands; and for other purposes.
Glasgow Corporation Order Confirmation Act 1965	1965 c. ii	2 June 1965
An Act to confirm a Provisional Order under the Private Legislation Procedure (Scotland) Act 1936 (Note: Private Legislation Procedure (Scotland) Act 1936 (26 Geo. 5 & 1 Edw. 8. c. 52)) relating to Glasgow Corporation.
	Glasgow Corporation Order 1965 Provisional Order to enact provisions as to the rates to be paid in respect of partially occupied properties; to make provision as to the abandonment by the trustees of the Clyde Navigation when required by the Corporation of the city of Glasgow of certain ferries across the river Clyde in the said city; to confirm a deed relating to certain lands in the parish of Callander in the county of Perth; to make provision for the carrying into effect in relation to certain lands in the said city of the agreement scheduled to and confirmed by the Glasgow Corporation Order, 1936, and for other purposes.	
Barclays Bank D.C.O. Act 1965 (repealed)	1965 c. iii	2 June 1965
An Act to increase the maximum permitted capital of Barclays Bank D.C.O. and for other purposes. (Repealed by Barclays Bank International Act 1974 (c. ix))
Walton and Weybridge Urban District Council Act 1965 (repealed)	1965 c. iv	2 June 1965
An Act to confer powers on the urban district council of Walton and Weybridge in relation to the appropriation and use of certain land; and for purposes incidental thereto. (Repealed by Surrey Act 1985 (c. iii))
Saint Anne, Soho Act 1965	1965 c. v	2 June 1965
An Act to provide for the erection by the London Diocesan Fund of a new church on part of the site of the former church of Saint Anne, Soho, and the burial ground appurtenant thereto; to authorise the use for other purposes of the said site and lands; and for purposes incidental thereto.
Liverpool Exchange Act 1965 (repealed)	1965 c. vi	2 June 1965
An Act to relieve the Liverpool Exchange Company Limited of their statutory obligations to provide a news room; and for other purposes. (Repealed by Liverpool Exchange Act 1988 (c. ix))
Port of London Act 1965 (repealed)	1965 c. vii	2 June 1965
An Act to amend the Port of London Acts 1920 to 1964; and for other purposes. (Repealed by Port of London Act 1968 (c. xxxii))
Saint Mark, Camberwell Act 1965	1965 c. viii	2 June 1965
An Act to provide for the removal of certain restrictions attaching to land including the site of the church of Saint Mark, Camberwell, in the London borough of Southwark; to authorise the sale, leasing or other disposition of that land and the use thereof for other purposes; and for purposes incidental thereto.
Durham Markets Company Act 1965	1965 c. ix	2 June 1965
An Act to increase the capital and borrowing powers of the Durham Markets Company; to re-enact with amendments certain of the statutory powers relating to the stallages, rents and tolls which may be demanded by the Company; to confer further powers on the Company; and for other purposes.
Saint Mary, Alverstoke, Burial Ground Act 1965	1965 c. x	2 June 1965
An Act to vest in the Portsmouth Diocesan Board of Finance a burial ground of the Church of Saint Mary, Alverstoke, in the borough of Gosport; to provide for the removal of restrictions attaching to the said burial ground and for the management, administration, development and disposition thereof; to authorise the erection of buildings thereon and to make provision for the use thereof; and for other purposes.
Coatbridge Burgh Extension Order Confirmation Act 1965	1965 c. xi	5 August 1965
An Act to confirm a Provisional Order under the Private Legislation Procedure (Scotland) Act 1936 relating to Coatbridge Burgh Extension.
	Coatbridge Burgh Extension Order 1965 Provisional Order to extend the municipal and police boundaries of the burgh of Coatbridge in the county of Lanark; and for other purposes.	
Writers to the Signet Widows' Fund Order Confirmation Act 1965 (repealed)	1965 c. xii	5 August 1965
An Act to confirm a Provisional Order under the Private Legislation Procedure (Scotland) Act 1936, relating to the Writers to the Signet Widows' Fund. (Repealed by Statute Law (Repeals) Act 1998 (c. 43))
	Writers to the Signet Widows' Fund Order 1965 Provisional Order to make further provision in relation to the regulation and control of the Writers to the Signet Widows' Fund to amend the Writers to the Signet Widows' Fund Order, 1955, and for other purposes.	
Royal Four Towns Fishing Order Confirmation Act 1965	1965 c. xiii	5 August 1965
An Act to confirm a Provisional Order under the Private Legislation Procedure (Scotland) Act 1936 relating to the Royal Four Towns Fishing.
	Royal Four Towns Fishing Order 1965 Provisional Order to incorporate Commissioners of Fishing for the Royal Four Towns, and to confer powers on such Commissioners with respect to certain fishings in the River Annan, and for other purposes.	
British Waterways Order Confirmation Act 1965	1965 c. xiv	5 August 1965
An Act to confirm a Provisional Order under the Private Legislation Procedure (Scotland) Act 1936, relating to British Waterways.
	British Waterways Order 1965 Provisional Order to extinguish rights of navigation on the Union Canal and the obligations upon the British Waterways Board to keep that canal open and to maintain it for purposes of navigation; and for other purposes.	
Welsh Office Provisional Order Confirmation (Llanelly) Act 1965 (repealed)	1965 c. xv	5 August 1965
An Act to confirm a Provisional Order of the Secretary of State relating to the borough of Llanelly. (Repealed by Dyfed Act 1987 (c. xxiv))
	Llanelly Order 1965 Provisional Order partially repealing a Local Act. (Note: Llanelly Local Board Act 1888 (51 & 52 Vict. c. clxxv))	
Ministry of Housing and Local Government Provisional Order Confirmation (Melton Mowbray) Act 1965	1965 c. xvi	5 August 1965
An Act to confirm a Provisional Order relating to the urban district of Melton Mowbray.
	Melton Mowbray Order 1965 Provisional Order altering a Local Act (Note: Melton Mowbray Cattle Market, &c. Act 1869 (32 & 33 Vict. c. xxvii)) and Confirming Acts.	
Ministry of Housing and Local Government Provisional Order Confirmation (Newton-le-Willows) Act 1965	1965 c. xvii	5 August 1965
An Act to confirm a Provisional Order relating to the urban district of Newton-le-Willows.
	Newton-le-Willows Order 1965 Provisional Order amending a Local Act. (Note: Newton District Improvement Act 1855 (18 & 19 Vict. c. c))	
Ministry of Housing and Local Government Provisional Order Confirmation (Rotherham) Act 1965 (repealed)	1965 c. xviii	5 August 1965
An Act to confirm a Provisional Order relating to the county borough of Rotherham. (Repealed by Statute Law (Repeals) Act 1989 (c. 43))
	Rotherham Order 1965 Provisional Order amending a Local Act. (Note: Rotherham Corporation Act 1937 (1 Edw. 8 & 1 Geo. 6. c. lxxx))	
University of Leeds Act 1965	1965 c. xix	5 August 1965
An Act to transfer the Leeds General Cemetery to The University of Leeds, to make provision for the improvement and maintenance thereof by The University of Leeds as a garden and open space within the University precincts, to enact provisions with regard to The University of Leeds; and for other purposes.
Greater London Council (General Powers) Act 1965	1965 c. xx	5 August 1965
An Act to confer further powers on the Greater London Council; and for other purposes.
British Railways Act 1965	1965 c. xxi	5 August 1965
An Act to empower the British Railways Board to construct works and to acquire lands; to extend the time for the compulsory purchase of certain lands; to empower the Fishguard and Rosslare Railways and Harbours Company to construct works and to acquire lands; to confer further powers on the Board and the company; and for other purposes.
Birmingham Corporation Act 1965 (repealed)	1965 c. xxii	5 August 1965
An Act to make further provision for the registration of houses in the city of Birmingham let or intended to be let in lodgings or occupied or intended to be occupied by members of more than one family, to confer further powers upon the lord mayor, aldermen and citizens of that city; and for other purposes. (Repealed by West Midlands County Council Act 1980 (c. xi))
British Waterways Act 1965	1965 c. xxiii	5 August 1965
An Act to empower the British Waterways Board to construct works and to acquire lands; to relieve the Board from their obligation to maintain certain waterways for navigation and to extinguish rights of navigation thereon; to confer further powers on the Board; and for other purposes.
Gulf Oil Refining Act 1965	1965 c. xxiv	5 August 1965
An Act to empower Gulf Oil Refining Limited to construct works and to acquire lands; and for other purposes.
Greater London Council (Money) Act 1965	1965 c. xxv	5 August 1965
An Act to regulate the expenditure on capital account and on lending to other persons by the Greater London Council during the financial period from 1st April 1965 to 30th September 1966; and for other purposes.
Aberdare Markets and Town Hall Act 1965	1965 c. xxvi	5 August 1965
An Act to confer further powers upon the Aberdare Markets and Town Hall Company; and for other purposes.
Flintshire County Council (Higher Ferry Saltney Footbridge) Act 1965 (repealed)	1965 c. xxvii	5 August 1965
An Act to empower the Flintshire County Council to construct a footbridge over the river Dee; to authorise the discontinuance and abandonment of the ferry across that river commonly known as the Higher Ferry Saltney; and for other purposes. (Repealed by Clwyd County Council Act 1985 (c. xliv))
Crude Oil Terminals (Humber) Act 1965	1965 c. xxviii	5 August 1965
An Act to empower the Crude Oil Terminals (Humber) Limited to acquire lands and to construct works; and for other purposes.
Devon County Council Act 1965	1965 c. xxix	5 August 1965
An Act to alter the precepting powers of the North Devon Water Board and to confer further powers on the board; to confer further powers on the Devon County Council and on local and highway authorities in the administrative county of Devon in relation to highways and the local government, improvement, health and finances of the county; and for other purposes.
Poole Corporation Act 1965 (repealed)	1965 c. xxx	5 August 1965
An Act to confer further powers upon the mayor, aldermen and burgesses of the borough of Poole, to make further provision for the control of Poole Bridge and for the improvement, health, local government and finances of the borough; and for other purposes. (Repealed by Borough of Poole (Poole Harbour Opening Bridges) Order 2006 (SI 2006/2310))
Saint Laurence, Catford Act 1965	1965 c. xxxi	5 August 1965
An Act to provide for the demolition of the church of Saint Laurence, Catford, in the London borough of Lewisham and of the parsonage house and church hall adjacent thereto; to authorise the sale of the sites thereof and of lands appurtenant thereto and the use for other purposes of the said sites and lands; and for purposes incidental thereto.
Huddersfield Corporation Act 1965	1965 c. xxxii	5 August 1965
An Act to empower the mayor, aldermen and burgesses of the borough of Huddersfield to acquire lands, to construct works and to impound and abstract water; to provide for the making of agreements between the Minister of Transport and the Corporation with respect to the construction and use of works; and for other purposes.
Rochester Bridge Act 1965	1965 c. xxxiii	5 August 1965
An Act to empower the Wardens and Assistants of Rochester Bridge in the county of Kent to construct works and to acquire lands; and for other purposes.
Brighton Skydeck Act 1965	1965 c. xxxiv	5 August 1965
An Act to authorise Skydeck Brighton Limited to construct works and to acquire lands; and for other purposes.
Conway Corporation Act 1965	1965 c. xxxv	5 August 1965
An Act to provide for the transfer of the Conway Bridge to the mayor, aldermen and burgesses of the borough of Conway or the National Trust for places of Historic Interest or Natural Beauty or other body approved by the Minister of Public Building and Works and for the dissolution of the Conway Bridge Commissioners; to authorise the taking down and removal of the said bridge; to make further provision with regard to the health, local government, improvement and finances of the borough; and for other purposes.
Pembrokeshire County Council Act 1965	1965 c. xxxvi	5 August 1965
An Act to provide for the construction and maintenance of a bridge across the river Daucleddau with approach roads and other works, to confer powers on the Narberth Rural District Council with respect to Kingsmoor Common; and for other purposes.
Rochdale Canal Act 1965	1965 c. xxxvii	5 August 1965
An Act to authorise the closing for navigation of part of the Rochdale Canal; to make provision as to voting rights, the qualification of directors and the alteration of capital; and for other purposes.
Birkenhead Corporation (Mersey Tunnel Approaches) Act 1965	1965 c. xxxviii	5 August 1965
An Act to provide for the improvement of the approaches to the Mersey Tunnel in the county borough of Birkenhead by the construction of street works and otherwise; to authorise the mayor, aldermen and burgesses of the county borough to purchase lands compulsorily; to confer further powers on the said mayor, aldermen and burgesses; and for other purposes.
City of London (Various Powers) Act 1965	1965 c. xxxix	5 August 1965
An Act to make provision with respect to streets and street trading in the city of London; to confer further powers upon the Corporation of London; and for other purposes.
Mersey Tunnel (Liverpool/Wallasey) &c. Act 1965	1965 c. xl	5 August 1965
An Act to authorise the construction of a tunnel under the river Mersey between Liverpool and Wallasey, approaches to such tunnel and street works in connection therewith; to confer further powers on the lord mayor, aldermen and citizens of the city of Liverpool and the mayor, aldermen and burgesses of the county borough of Wallasey; to reconstitute the Mersey Tunnel Joint Committee; and for other purposes.
London Transport Act 1965	1965 c. xli	5 August 1965
An Act to empower the London Transport Board to construct works and to acquire lands, to extend the time for the compulsory purchase of certain lands, to confer further powers on the Board; and for other purposes.
Manchester Corporation Act 1965	1965 c. xlii	5 August 1965
An Act to confer further powers on the lord mayor, aldermen and citizens of the city of Manchester in relation to industry, lands, markets, water, public health, local government, finance and pensions; and for other purposes.
Corporation of the Trinity House of Leith Order Confirmation Act 1965	1965 c. xliii	22 December 1965
An Act to confirm a Provisional Order under the Private Legislation Procedure (Scotland) Act 1936, relating to the Corporation of the Trinity House of Leith.
	Corporation of the Trinity House of Leith Order 1965 Provisional Order to change the name of the Corporation of the Master and Assistants of the Trinity House of Leith to the Corporation of the Trinity House of Leith; to reconstitute and confer new powers upon the Corporation; and for other purposes.	
Clyde Navigation (Superannuation) Order Confirmation Act 1965	1965 c. xliv	22 December 1965
An Act to confirm a Provisional Order under the Private Legislation Procedure (Scotland) Act 1936, relating to Clyde Navigation (Superannuation).
	Clyde Navigation (Superannuation) Order 1965 Provisional Order to amend the provisions of the Clyde Navigation (Superannuation) Order, 1908, the Clyde Navigation Act, 1929, (Note: Clyde Navigation Act 1929 (20 & 21 Geo. 5. c. xx)) the Clyde Navigation (Superannuation) Order, 1949, the Clyde Navigation (Superannuation) Order, 1955, and the Clyde Navigation Order, 1964, relating to the superannuation fund for the officers and servants of the Trustees of the Clyde Navigation and for other purposes.	
Clyde Port Authority Order Confirmation Act 1965	1965 c. xlv	22 December 1965
An Act to confirm a Provisional Order under the Private Legislation Procedure (Scotland) Act 1936, relating to the Clyde Port Authority.
	Clyde Port Authority Order 1965 Provisional Order to incorporate the Clyde Port Authority; to transfer to that Authority the undertakings of the Trustees of the Clyde Navigation, the Trustees of the Port and Harbours of Greenock and the Trustees of the Clyde Lighthouses, to confer powers on that Authority and for other purposes.	
Glasgow Corporation (No. 2) Order Confirmation Act 1965	1965 c. xlvi	22 December 1965
An Act to confirm a Provisional Order under the Private Legislation Procedure (Scotland) Act 1936, relating to Glasgow Corporation.
	Glasgow Corporation (No. 2) Order 1965 Provisional Order to confer further powers on the Corporation of the city of Glasgow with respect to their tunnels under the river Clyde between Linthouse and Whiteinch; to extend the time for the acquisition of lands for the construction of certain sewers; to confer further powers on the Corporation with respect to the acquisition of lands, the investment of their superannuation fund, the administration of the city and for other purposes.	
Heriot-Watt College Order Confirmation Act 1965	1965 c. xlvii	22 December 1965
An Act to confirm a Provisional Order under the Private Legislation Procedure (Scotland) Act 1936, relating to Heriot-Watt College.
	Heriot-Watt College Order 1965 Provisional Order to make provision, in the event of Her Majesty granting a Royal Charter for the constitution and founding of a University in or in the vicinity of the city of Edinburgh, for the transfer to the said University of the superannuation fund of the Governors of Heriot-Watt College and as to the superannuation of certain officers and servants of the said Governors (including former officers and servants); as to legacies and other bequests in favour of the said Governors or the said College; and for purposes connected with the matters aforesaid.	

== See also ==
- List of acts of the Parliament of the United Kingdom
