= Contracts of Employment Act 1972 =

Act of the Parliament of the United Kingdom

Contracts of Employment Act 1972 (Note: Section 14(1).)
- Act of Parliament
- Parliament of the United Kingdom
- Long title: An Act to consolidate certain enactments relating to contracts of employment.
- Citation: 1972 c. 53
- Territorial extent: England and Wales; Scotland; (Note: Section 14(2).)

Dates
- Royal assent: 27 July 1972
- Commencement: 27 July 1972 (Note: The Acts of Parliament (Commencement) Act 1793.)
- Repealed: 1 November 1978
Other legislation
Amends	See § Repealed enactments
Repeals/revokes	See § Repealed enactments
Amended by	House of Commons (Administration) Act 1978
Repealed by	Employment Protection (Consolidation) Act 1978

Status: Repealed

Text of statute as originally enacted

The Contracts of Employment Act 1972 (c. 53) was an act of the Parliament of the United Kingdom that consolidated enactments relating to contracts of employment in Great Britain.

== Provisions ==
=== Repealed enactments ===
Section 13(1) of the act repealed 3 enactments, listed in schedule 3 to the act.

Citation	Short title	Extent of repeal
1963 c. 49	Contracts of Employment Act 1963	The whole act.
1965 c. 62	Redundancy Payments Act 1965	Sections 37 to 39. Section 48(7). In section 59(2), paragraphs (a) and (b) of the proviso.
1971 c. 72	Industrial Relations Act 1971	Sections 19 to 21. Schedule 2.

== Subsequent developments ==
The whole act was repealed by section 159(3) of, and schedule 17 to, the Employment Protection (Consolidation) Act 1978, which came into force on 1 November 1978.
