= Industrial Injuries and Diseases (Old Cases) Act 1967 =

Act of the Parliament of the United Kingdom

Industrial Injuries and Diseases (Old Cases) Act 1967 (Note: Section 16(1).)
- Act of Parliament
- Parliament of the United Kingdom
- Long title: An Act to consolidate certain enactments relating to workmen's compensation or other benefit in respect of employment before 5th July 1948.
- Citation: 1967 c. 34
- Territorial extent: England and Wales; Scotland; (Note: Section 16(2).)

Dates
- Royal assent: 12 June 1967
- Commencement: 22 June 1967 (Note: Section 16(3). The Industrial Injuries and Diseases (Old Cases) Act 1967 (Commencement) Order 1967 (SI 1967/921).)
- Repealed: 6 April 1975
Other legislation
Amends	See § Repealed enactments
Repeals/revokes	See § Repealed enactments
Amended by	National Insurance Act 1967; Statute Law (Repeals) Act 1973
Repealed by	Social Security (Consequential Provisions) Act 1975

Status: Repealed

Text of statute as originally enacted

The Industrial Injuries and Diseases (Old Cases) Act 1967 (c. 34) was an act of the Parliament of the United Kingdom that consolidated certain enactments relating to workmen's compensation or other benefit in respect of employment before 5 July 1948 in Great Britain.

== Provisions ==
=== Repealed enactments ===
Section 15(1) of the act repealed 12 enactments, listed in the schedule to the act.

Enactments repealed by section 15(1)
Citation	Short title	Extent of repeal
9 & 10 Geo. 6. c. 62	National Insurance (Industrial Injuries) Act 1946	Section 89, except subsection (1)(c).
9 & 10 Geo. 6. c. 62	National Insurance (Industrial Injuries) Act 1946	Schedule 9.
14 & 15 Geo. 6. c. 22	Workmen's Compensation (Supplementation) Act 1951	The whole act.
15 & 16 Geo. 6 & 1 Eliz. 2. c. 4	Pneumoconiosis and Byssinosis Benefit Act 1951	The whole act.
2 & 3 Eliz. 2. c. 16	Industrial Diseases (Benefit) Act 1954	The whole act.
5 & 6 Eliz. 2. c. 26	National Insurance Act 1957	Paragraph 3 of the Schedule.
6 & 7 Eliz. 2. c. 1	National Insurance (No. 2) Act 1957	Section 4(2).
10 & 11 Eliz. 2. c. 6	Family Allowances and National Insurance Act 1961	Sections 3(4) and 14(5).
1964 c. 96	National Insurance &c. Act 1964	Section 3(3).
1965 c. 52	National Insurance (Industrial Injuries) Act 1965	In section 61(1), the words "or section 89 of the Act of 1946".
1965 c. 79	Workmen's Compensation and Benefit (Amendment) Act 1965	The whole act.
1966 c. 6	National Insurance Act 1966	Section 6(4)(d).
1967 c. 25	National Insurance (Industrial Injuries) (Amendment) Act 1967	In section 1(1), the words "the following enactments, namely", paragraphs (b) and (c), and the word "each".
1967 c. 25	National Insurance (Industrial Injuries) (Amendment) Act 1967	Section 1(2) from "or, as" onwards.
1967 c. 25	National Insurance (Industrial Injuries) (Amendment) Act 1967	Section 1(3).
1967 c. 25	National Insurance (Industrial Injuries) (Amendment) Act 1967	In section 1(4), the words "or a scheme under the Supplementation Act or the Benefit Act", the words "or, as the case may be, that the scheme is" and the words from "or, as the case may be, section" onwards.
1967 c. 25	National Insurance (Industrial Injuries) (Amendment) Act 1967	Section 2 from "or under" onwards.
1967 c. 25	National Insurance (Industrial Injuries) (Amendment) Act 1967	Section 3(3)(b).
1967 c. 25	National Insurance (Industrial Injuries) (Amendment) Act 1967	In section 3(4) the words from "section 5(3)" to "Benefit Act".

== Subsequent developments ==
In section 13(1)(a) of the act , the words " or falling to be construed as a reference to " were repealed by section 1(1) of, and part XIII of schedule 1 to, the Statute Law (Repeals) Act 1973, which came into force on 18 July 1973.

The whole act was repealed by section 1(2) of, and schedule 1 to, the Social Security (Consequential Provisions) Act 1975, which came into force on 6 April 1975.
