= Workmen's Compensation (Supplementation) Act 1951 =

Act of the Parliament of the United Kingdom

- Act of Parliament
- Parliament of the United Kingdom
- Long title: An Act to provide for the payment of allowances out of the Industrial Injuries Fund with a view to supplementing workmen's compensation where the accident happened before nineteen twenty-four, and for purposes connected therewith.
- Citation: 14 & 15 Geo. 6. c. 22
- Territorial extent: United Kingdom

Dates
- Royal assent: 21 March 1951
- Commencement: 21 March 1951 (Note: The Acts of Parliament (Commencement) Act 1793.)
- Repealed: 22 June 1967 (Note: The Industrial Injuries and Diseases (Old Cases) Act 1967 (Commencement) Order 1967 (SI 1967/921).)

Other legislation
- Repealed by: Industrial Injuries and Diseases (Old Cases) Act 1967

Status: Repealed

Text of statute as originally enacted

The Workmen's Compensation (Supplementation) Act 1951 (14 & 15 Geo. 6. c. 22) was an act of the Parliament of the United Kingdom. It was passed during the Labour government of Clement Attlee. It tackled the problem of the "pre-1924" compensation cases by enabling supplementary weekly allowances to be paid to workmen who had suffered workplace injuries from before 1924 in order to bring their compensation broadly to the same level as that payable to "post-1923" men.

== Subsequent developments ==
The whole act was repealed by section 15(1) of, and the schedule to, the Industrial Injuries and Diseases (Old Cases) Act 1967, which came into force on 22 June 1967.
