= Teachers' Superannuation Act 1967 =

Act of the Parliament of the United Kingdom

Teachers' Superannuation Act 1967 (Note: Section 18(1).)
- Act of Parliament
- Parliament of the United Kingdom
- Long title: An Act to consolidate the enactments relating to the superannuation of teachers and certain other persons employed in connection with the provision of educational services.
- Citation: 1967 c. 12
- Territorial extent: England and Wales (Note: Section 18(3).)

Dates
- Royal assent: 22 March 1967
- Commencement: 22 March 1967 (section 18 and paragraph 7 of schedule 3) (Note: Section 18(2).); 1 April 1967 (rest of act) (Note: Section 18(2). The Teachers' Superannuation Regulations 1967 (SI 1967/489).)
- Repealed: 25 March 1972 (Note: The Superannuation Act 1972 (Commencement No. 1) Order 1972 (SI 1972/325).)

Other legislation
- Amends: See § Repealed enactments
- Repeals/revokes: See § Repealed enactments
- Repealed by: Superannuation Act 1972

Status: Repealed

Text of statute as originally enacted

The Teachers' Superannuation Act 1967 (c. 12) was an act of the Parliament of the United Kingdom that consolidated enactments related to the superannuation of teachers and certain other persons employed in connection with the provision of educational services in England and Wales.

== Provisions ==
=== Repealed enactments ===
Section 17(2) of the act repealed 4 enactments, listed in schedule 4 to the act.

Enactments repealed by section 17(2)
Citation	Short title	Extent of repeal
15 & 16 Geo. 5. c. 59	Teachers (Superannuation) Act 1925	The title. Section 9. In section 10, subsections (1) and (2). Section 15. Section 22. In section 23, subsections (1) and (4). Schedule 2.
8 & 9 Geo. 6. c. 14	Teachers (Superannuation) Act 1945	The title. In section 11, subsection (6). In section 14, subsections (1) and (4). Schedule 2, so far as it amends sections 9 and 10 of the Teachers (Superannuation) Act 1925.
4 & 5 Eliz. 2. c. 53	Teachers (Superannuation) Act 1956	The title. Section 1. In section 2, subsections (1) and (2). In section 3, subsections (1) to (3). Section 4. Section 26. Part III. Schedule 1, so far as not repealed by the Teachers' Superannuation Act 1965.
1965 c. 83	Teachers' Superannuation Act 1965	The whole act.

== Subsequent developments ==
The whole act was repealed by section 29(4) of, and schedule 8 to, the Superannuation Act 1972, which came into force on 25 March 1972.
