= Family Allowances Act 1965 =

Act of the Parliament of the United Kingdom

Family Allowances Act 1965 (Note: Section 25(1).)
- Act of Parliament
- Parliament of the United Kingdom
- Long title: An Act to consolidate the Family Allowances Acts 1945 to 1964 and certain related enactments.
- Citation: 1965 c. 53
- Territorial extent: England and Wales; Scotland; (Note: Section 25(2). Sections 23 and 24 also extended to Northern Ireland.)

Dates
- Royal assent: 5 August 1965
- Commencement: 6 September 1965 (Note: Section 25(3). The National Insurance Act 1965 (Commencement) Order 1965 (SI 1965/1650).)
- Repealed: 4 April 1977
Other legislation
Amended by	Social Work (Scotland) Act 1968; Social Security (Consequential Provisions) Act 1975
Repealed by	Child Benefit Act 1975
Relates to	National Insurance Act 1965; National Insurance (Industrial Injuries) Act 1965; National Health Service Contributions Act 1965; Statute Law Revision (Consequential Repeals) Act 1965; Social Security Act 1975; Social Security (Consequential Provisions) Act 1975

Status: Repealed

Text of statute as originally enacted

The Family Allowances Act 1965 (c. 53) was an act of the Parliament of the United Kingdom that consolidated enactments relating to family allowances in Great Britain.

The Family Allowances Acts 1945 to 1964 consolidated by this act were repealed by the Statute Law Revision (Consequential Repeals) Act 1965, which came into force on the same day as this act.

== Subsequent developments ==
The whole act was repealed by section 21(2) of, and schedule 5 to, the Child Benefit Act 1975, which came into force on 4 April 1977.
