= Supply of Goods (Implied Terms) Act 1973 =

Act of the Parliament of the United Kingdom

Supply of Goods (Implied Terms) Act 1973 (Note: Section 18(1).)
- Act of Parliament
- Parliament of the United Kingdom
- Long title: An Act to amend the law with respect to the terms to be implied in contracts of sale of goods and hire-purchase agreements and on the exchange of goods for trading stamps, and with respect to the terms of conditional sale agreements; and for connected purposes.
- Citation: 1973 c. 13
- Territorial extent: United Kingdom (Note: Section 17.)

Dates
- Royal assent: 18 April 1973
- Commencement: 18 May 1973 (Note: Section 18(3).)
Other legislation
Amends	Sale of Goods Act 1893; Trading Stamps Act 1964; Hire-Purchase Act 1965; Hire-Purchase (Scotland) Act 1965; Hire Purchase Act (Northern Ireland) 1966
Amended by	Northern Ireland Constitution Act 1973; Consumer Credit Act 1974; Unfair Contract Terms Act 1977; Sale of Goods Act 1979; Statute Law (Repeals) Act 1981; Supply of Goods and Services Act 1982; Sale and Supply of Goods Act 1994; Regulatory Reform (Trading Stamps) Order 2005; Law Reform (Miscellaneous Provisions) (Northern Ireland) Order 2005; Consumer Rights Act 2015

Status: Amended

Text of statute as originally enacted

Revised text of statute as amended

Text of the Supply of Goods (Implied Terms) Act 1973 as in force today (including any amendments) within the United Kingdom, from legislation.gov.uk.

The Supply of Goods (Implied Terms) Act 1973 (c. 13) is an act of the Parliament of the United Kingdom that provided implied terms in contracts for the supply of goods and for hire-purchase agreements, and limited the use of exclusion clauses. The result of a joint report by the England and Wales Law Commission and the Scottish Law Commission, First Report on Exemption Clauses, the act was granted royal assent on 18 April 1973 and came into force a month later. It met with a mixed reaction from academics, who praised the additional protection it offered while at the same time questioning whether it was enough; several aspects of the act's draftsmanship and implementation were also called into question. Much of the act was repealed by the Sale of Goods Act 1979, which included many of the 1973 act's provisions.

== Background ==
Under earlier contractual theory a contract was an "empty form" that the two parties, as equal partners, could add whatever (legally permissible) rights or obligations they saw fit to. Once a contract was signed, ways to get out of it were limited to proving that agreement was lacking for reason of duress, misrepresentation, or fraud. The general theory was freedom of contract; a contract can include almost any terms, as long as both parties agree to them.

In practice, this doctrine created problems. Firstly, while the idea that a person should be held to those terms he agrees to and signs works well with individually negotiated contracts, as in contracts between businesses, increasingly common "standard form" contracts – printed contracts drawn up in advance by one party, such as those used by banks, where the only options are to sign as-is or walk away. This seemed to be a violation of the idea that contracts should be negotiated between the parties; this is a particular problem where contract terms are standardized across an industry (that is, the customer can get no advantage by buying from a competitor).

Moreover, form contracts may include clauses placing severe legal constraints on the non-drafting party (exclusion clauses). These could make it very difficult to pursue legal action even when a consumer had very clearly been wronged. Although it had long been argued that "unfair" clauses should be struck down, the courts were obliged by the centuries-old doctrine of freedom of contract to uphold them.

In Karsales (Harrow) Ltd v Wallis [1956] 1 W.L.R. 936 the courts developed the doctrine of fundamental breach; if one party had breached the contract in such a way that, if there was no exclusion clause, it would void the contract, such a contract could be set aside. Although a step forward, this doctrine was problematic, as pointed out by Lord Reid in Suisse Atlantique Societe d'Armament SA v NV Rotterdamsche Kolen Centrale [1967] 1 AC 361; it failed to discriminate between exclusion clauses that were the result of unequal bargaining and those that were not. In 1970 the England and Wales Law Commission and the Scottish Law Commission produced their First Report on Exemption Clauses, which proposed to reform this area of law. The Supply of Goods (Implied Terms) Act 1973 was in part based on the report, but it went further in some respects. It was given royal assent on 18 April 1973, and came into force a month later.

== Act ==
The act extends the reach of implied conditions first laid out in the Sale of Goods Act 1893. Section 1 replaced section 12 of the 1893 act, containing three types of implied undertakings to title; a condition that the seller has the right to sell, or will when the property has passed to him, a warranty that the goods have no additional costs that the buyer has not been informed of, and a warranty of quiet possession. These provisions cannot be excluded, although if there is, in the original contract, a provision that the seller can only transfer what title he has, there is no condition that the seller has the right to sell. The act also regulated sale by description, where products are sold based on a description given of them. Section 2 provides that "a sale of goods shall not be prevented from being a sale by description by reason only that, being exposed for sale or hire, they are selected by the buyer". This is to ensure that a sale in a self-service store is considered sale by description, and that the sale is therefore covered by other provisions.

Section 3 covers the "merchantable quality" of goods. With the exception of defects that are pointed out to the consumer, or which the consumer should easily have been able to see, sellers are expected to provide goods of "merchantable quality". This is defined as goods "fit for the purpose or purposes for which goods of that kind are commonly bought as it is reasonable to expect having regard to any description applied to them, the price (if relevant) and all the other circumstances". Unlike the 1893 act, the goods must be fit for purpose only if sold "in the course of a business". Previously, those provisions did not extend to goods sold by an agent; under the new act all implied terms were extended to sales by agents, unless it was clear that the goods were not being sold in the course of a business.

The act is designed to prevent the avoidance of implied terms through exclusion clauses. It provides (in Section 4) that any attempt to exclude a seller in consumer sales from sections 2 and 3 is void. In non-consumer sales an exclusion clause is void "to the extent that it is shown that it would not be fair or reasonable to allow reliance on the term". The burden of proof in such situations is on the party seeking to avoid liability through the exclusion clause. For determining whether it is "fair or reasonable" to allow the exclusion clause, five tests are used;

1. whether the parties were of equal bargaining strength,
2. whether the buyer was induced to agree to the clause,
3. whether the buyer knew, or ought to have known of the exclusion clause,
4. where the liability is conditional, if the condition is reasonable and
5. whether the goods were supplied as part of a special order.

These basic tests were later extended into the Unfair Contract Terms Act 1977.

Hire-purchase agreements are also regulated by this act. The provisions are very similar to those for sale of goods agreements, with the section on exclusion clauses identical. Under the 1893 act, conditional sale agreements (where the buyer takes possession of the goods, but the seller retains the right to repossess them) were treated as hire-purchase agreements, despite being fundamentally sales. With the unification of provisions for hire-purchase and sale of goods agreements, conditional sale agreements are now treated as sales.

== Impact ==
Christopher Carr, an academic and practising lawyer, called the implementation of section 1 "slightly awkward", suggesting that in some ways it was more limited than the provisions contained in the Sale of Goods Act 1893 from the seller's point of view. Unlike with the 1893 act, a seller cannot exclude the provisions, and while the right to sell can be excluded it is not clear how this might be done. Turpin complimented the section on hire-purchase agreements, although noting some flaws in draftsmanship; he also questioned whether or not the protection given to consumers would be sufficient. Prior to the Unfair Contract Terms Act 1977, the Supply of Goods (Implied Terms) Act 1973 was one of the few limitations on clauses in consumer contracts. Most of it was eventually superseded by the Sale of Goods Act 1979, which included many of the act's provisions.

== Bibliography ==
- Beale, Hugh (1978). "Unfair Contract Terms Act 1977". Journal of Law and Society. 5 (1): 114–121. ISSN 1467-6478. JSTOR 1409853.
- Carr, Christopher (1973). "An Optimistic Look at the Contract Provisions of Unfair Contract Terms Act 1977". Modern Law Review. 36 (5): 703–706. ISSN 0026-7961. JSTOR 1095682.
- Diamond, Aubrey (1970). "The Law Commissions' First Report on Exemption Clauses". Modern Law Review. 33 (1): 77–80. doi:10.1111/j.1468-2230.1970.tb01254.x. ISSN 0026-7961. JSTOR 1094691.
- Turpin, Colin (1973). "The Unfair Contract Terms Act: Wider Still and Wider?". Cambridge Law Journal. 32 (2): 418–420. ISSN 0008-1973. JSTOR 4507707.
