= Lesney Products & Co v Nolan =

- Court: Court of Appeal
- Citations: [1976] EWCA Civ 8, [1977] ICR 235

Keywords
- Redundancy, dismissal

Lesney Products & Co v Nolan [1976] EWCA Civ 8 is a UK labour law case concerning redundancy.

== Facts ==
Lesney Products & Co removed its night shift and divided its day shift into two. The company still produced the same amount of products (even though demand had fallen) but it was no longer giving overtime to its workers. Employees who saw their wages drop by a third refused to work on the new day shift. They were dismissed and they claimed redundancy.

The Tribunal upheld the employees' claim.

== Judgment ==
Lord Denning MR said that the employees were not redundant, because the employer had a legitimate business reason for wishing to vary the contracts, and the employees' non-acceptance effectively amounted to a voluntary resignation.

This is a very difficult case. It arises under the Redundancy Payments Act 1965. The employers produce little model toys for children. They have factories in several places. This case concerns the factory in Lee Conservancy Road, Hackney…

The dismissal must be attributable to for employees " the fact that the requirements of that business/to carry out work of a particular kind ... have ceased or diminished", etc. In applying that principle, it is important that nothing should be done to impair the ability of employers to reorganise their work force and their times and conditions of work so as to improve efficiency. They may reorganise it so as to reduce overtime and thus to save themselves money, but that does not give the man a right to redundancy payment. Overtime might be reduced, for instance, by taking on more men: but that would not give the existing staff a right to redundancy payments. Also when overtime is reduced by a reorganisation of working hours, that does not give rise to a right to redundancy payment, so long as the work to be done is the same.

It seems to me that the problem in this case is whether this re-organisation - whereby the one long day shift plus overtime was altered into two day shifts for the machine setters - was done in the interests of efficiency or whether it was due to a drop in the amount of work required for the men employed in the factory. The employers gave evidence (which was not contradicted) that the amount of work coming into the factory and being done on the day shifts by all the direct operatives was just the same as before. There was no reduction in it. The night shift was done away with for want of work -and on that accord the night shift people would get redundancy payments. But the day shifts turned out the same amount of work by the same number of women operatives. So far as the machine setters were concerned, they did the same work for the day shifts as they did before. They saw that the machines were properly set and maintained, and turned out the toys as before. In these cases the re-organisation was not done because of less work but it was done in the interests of efficiency and to save the employers having to pay so much overtime.

It is shown by the evidence that the employers did not reduce the number of machine setters. They still wanted the whole of the 36. When some of them refused to come back, the employers needed others to replace the men. They put advertisements in the papers for them. So they wanted the same number of men.

No doubt the men at work would not get as much overtime as they had done under the previous system. But the company had a scheme for alleviating the position. The men got compensation in that they received the basic wage plus 171/2 per cent shift premium. It seems that on average a person who previously received £70 a week might now only be getting £54. So there was to that extent a saving in the money which the company spent on overtime.

The decisions of the tribunals were very carefully considered; but they do seem to have been led into error by asking whether there was "a redundancy situation" instead of looking at the words of the statute and asking whether the amount of work had ceased or diminished.

Stephenson LJ and Shaw LJ concurred.

== See also ==
- UK labour law
- Unfair dismissal
