= Burmah Oil Co Ltd v Lord Advocate =

1965 House of Lords case of constitutional importance

Burmah Oil Company Ltd v Lord Advocate
- Court: House of Lords
- Decided: 21 April 1964
- Citations: [1965] AC 75; [1964] 2 WLR 1231; [1964] 2 All ER 348; 1964 SC (HL) 117; 1964 SLT 218; [1964] 4 WLUK 46; (1964) 108 SJ 401
- Transcript: House of Lords judgment

Case history
- Appealed from: Outer House of the Court of Session
- Subsequent action: War Damage Act 1965

Court membership
- Judges sitting: Lord Reid; Viscount Radcliffe; Lord Hodson; Lord Pearce; Lord Upjohn

Keywords
- Compensation; Constitutional law; Royal prerogative

Burmah Oil Company Ltd v Lord Advocate [1965] AC 75, was a court case, raised in Scotland, and decided ultimately in the House of Lords. The case is an important decision in British constitutional law and had unusual legal repercussions at the time.

== Facts ==
This case concerned the destruction of oil fields in Burma belonging to the Burmah Oil Company by British forces during the Japanese invasion of Burma in 1942. The destruction was ordered in order to prevent the installations from falling into the hands of the advancing Imperial Japanese Army. Burmah Oil brought an action against the UK government, represented by the Lord Advocate.

In the Outer House of the Court of Session, Lord Kilbrandon found in favour of Burmah Oil. The Crown appealed, and the First Division of the Inner House of the Court of Session unanimously reversed the decision below. Burmah Oil then appealed to the House of Lords.

== Judgment ==
Five Lords of Appeal in Ordinary sitting in the House of Lords held by a 3–2 majority that although the damage was lawful, it was the equivalent of requisitioning the property. Any act of requisition was done for the good of the public, at the expense of the individual proprietor, and for that reason, the proprietor should be compensated from public funds. Viscount Radcliffe and Lord Hodson dissented.

== Significance ==
In the end, the result was frustrated by the passing of a retroactive Act of Parliament, the War Damage Act 1965, which retroactively exempts the Crown from liability in respect of damage to, or destruction of, property caused by acts lawfully done by the Crown during, or in contemplation of the outbreak of, a war in which it is engaged.

== See also ==
- UK company law
- UK public services law
