= Family Allowances Act 1945 =

Act of the Parliament of the United Kingdom

Family Allowances Act 1945 (Note: Section 29.)
- Act of Parliament
- Parliament of the United Kingdom
- Long title: An Act to provide for the payment of family allowances.
- Citation: 8 & 9 Geo. 6. c. 41
- Territorial extent: United Kingdom

Dates
- Royal assent: 15 June 1945
- Commencement: 6 August 1946 (Note: Section 28.)
- Repealed: 6 September 1965 (Note: The National Insurance Act 1965 (Commencement) Order 1965 (SI 1965/1650))
Other legislation
Amended by	Magistrates' Courts Act 1952
Repealed by	Statute Law Revision (Consequential Repeals) Act 1965

Status: Repealed

Text of statute as originally enacted

The Family Allowances Act 1945 (8 & 9 Geo. 6. c. 41) was an act of the Parliament of the United Kingdom. The act was the first law to provide child benefit in the United Kingdom. It was enacted on 15 June 1945 when the caretaker Conservative government was in office under Winston Churchill, but it did not come into effect until 6 August 1946 when the Labour government under Clement Attlee was in power. (Note: In his closing speech to Parliament, the King said that "legislation has been passed to provide for a scheme of family allowances, in which the families of serving men will be included".)

Family allowances had been one of the items proposed by the Beveridge Report in 1942. The Labour Party briefly debated pressing for allowances during the Second World War, but a party conference resolution to this end was opposed by the trades unions for fear that the amount paid would be taken into account in wage negotiations, leaving workers no better off.

As passed, the act empowered the Minister of National Insurance to pay an allowance of five shillings per week for each child in a family other than the eldest; later acts increased this sum. It was payable whilst the child was of school age, up to the age of eighteen, if apprenticed or in full-time school education.

== Subsequent developments ==
The whole act was repealed by section 1(1) of, and the schedule to, the Statute Law Revision (Consequential Repeals) Act 1965, which came into force on 6 September 1965.

== See also ==
- Child benefits in the United Kingdom
