= Contracts of Employment Act 1963 =

Act of the Parliament of the United Kingdom

Contracts of Employment Act 1963 (Note: Section 10(1).)
- Act of Parliament
- Parliament of the United Kingdom
- Long title: An Act to require a minimum period of notice to terminate the employment of those who have been employed for a qualifying period, to provide for matters connected with the giving of the notice, and to require employers to give written particulars of terms of employment.
- Citation: 1963 c. 49
- Introduced by: John Hare (Commons)
- Territorial extent: England and Wales; Scotland; (Note: Section 10(2).)

Dates
- Royal assent: 31 July 1963
- Commencement: 6 July 1964 (Note: Section 10(3). The Contracts of Employment Act 1963 (Commencement) Order 1963 (SI 1963/1916).)
- Repealed: 27 July 1972
Other legislation
Repealed by	Contracts of Employment Act 1972

Status: Repealed

Text of statute as originally enacted

The Contracts of Employment Act 1963 (c. 49) was an act of the Parliament of the United Kingdom which introduced the requirement to give reasonable notice before dismissal (now Employment Rights Act 1996 section 86) and written particulars of a contract of employment (now Employment Rights Act 1996 section 1). It is widely recognised as "the first modern employment protection statute".

== Legislative passage ==
=== First reading ===
For the first reading of the Contracts of Employment Bill, Hansard records the following.

‘Contracts of Employment. Bill to require a minimum period of notice to terminate the employment of those who have been employed for a qualifying period, to provide for matters connected with the giving of the notice and to require employers to give written particulars of terms of employment, presented by Mr. John Hare, supported by the Prime Minister, Mr R. A. Butler, Mr. Iain Macleod, Mr. Michael Noble, and the Attorney-General; read the First time; to be read a Second time Tomorrow and to be printed. [Bill 48].’

=== Second reading ===
The Second reading came in February. Minister of Labour, John Hare, stated in the government's introduction for the second reading,

"The Bill is a part of the Government’s plans to provide greater security for workers. This is a time when industry must be quick to adopt improved methods and exploit new techniques if we are to expand our production and maintain our competitive position… fear of change and what it can mean is a powerful incentive to resist change and slow it down by all possible means. But if we reduce that fear and give proper consideration and effective help, we can help, I think, to create an atmosphere in which the need for change is accepted and there is co-operation in creating an efficient and flexible economy.’

Responding to the argument of the British Employers' Confederation (the forerunner of the Confederation of British Industry (CBI)) that reasonable notice should be left to negotiation, he said he understood the view. "Voluntary methods are fine, but they are fine only if they are effective."

"I do not think that we should forget that progress by voluntary negotiation benefits, of course, the organised worker - the trade union member. But there are many millions of employees who are outside the trade unions, not only in industry but in commerce - workers in shops and offices. I submit that the rights of these people are just as important. The only way to secure the advance that is needed for everyone is to lay down minimum standards, as we are doing in the Bill. But I repeat that these are minimum standards. The object of the Bill is not only to bring everybody up to the minimum but also to encourage employers to improve on the minimum on a voluntary basis."

Responding to criticism of the Trades Union Congress, which was opposed to the idea that workers would have to give longer notice just like the employer, Mr Hare said,

"I think that it is right that if an obligation is imposed on one party to a contract there should be an obligation on the other party.

He said however the Government was open to the idea that unions and employers could contract out of the arrangements, and to consider whether the Bill could be made more flexible.

=== Purpose of notice and written statement ===
On the new right to notice before termination of employment, and the right to one's previous average pay in the period of notice, Mr Hare said,

"The purpose of this Clause is to prevent a worker having to face a serious drop in pay when he has to change jobs. This, as we know, is often a difficult and anxious time for a man to go through. It is surely right, then, that during notice, worry about pay should not be added to other worries. After all, the person we are concerned with here is the worker who has worked steadily for his employer for two years at least and often longer."

On the purpose of having a written record of one's terms, Mr Hare stated that,

"this is an important requirement. It gives the worker for the first time a right to a clear understanding of the terms upon which he is employed. He will know as an individual where he stands, and should any question arise over the terms on which he works he will have definite evidence which can be used in a court of law. Also, he has a right to have the terms of his contract which affect him most closely set down in black and white."

To sum up, Mr Hare commended the Bill by saying,

"It has been suggested that it will harm industrial relations. I entirely reject that view. It is really ostrich-like for people to pretend that all is well with our present arrangements for terminating employment. In firms in differing industries through the land long-service employees can be "chucked out" at an hour, a day, or a week's notice, however faithfully they may have served their employer. The Government, for the first time, are intervening in contracts between employers and workers, thus benefiting many millions of workers in factories, farms, offices and shops. For this reason, I commend the Bill to the House."

=== Third reading ===
The bill was read, with a few proposed amendments, for a third time by the House of Commons and passed on 1 May 1963.

== Provisions ==
In its final form, the act required a weekly hours threshold of 21 hours before an employee would fall within its protective sphere. According to William Whitlaw MP, the Parliamentary Secretary for the Ministry of Labour, that was intended to exclude "people with spare-time occupations and those who do weekend jobs" and cases in which "the employment relationship is not of substantial importance to the parties concerned". Those envisaged, somewhat insensitively, included twilight shift workers who were "nearly all women with domestic responsibilities". That threshold was carried into the Redundancy Payments Act 1965 and the Industrial Relations Act 1971.

However, for notice and terms of employment, the threshold was gradually lowered and then abolished after it was found incompatible with the Equal Treatment Directive, 76/207/EEC, by the House of Lords in R v. Secretary of State for Employment, ex parte Equal Opportunities Commission.

To get a written statement, it was necessary to wait for five weeks of employment.

Under the act, it was a criminal offence, punishable by fine, for the employer to refuse to give the requisite written statement. However, that was repealed by the Labour government in 1965.

== Subsequent developments ==
The whole act was repealed by section 13(1) of, and schedule 3 to, the Contracts of Employment Act 1972, which came into force on 27 July 1972.

== See also ==
- UK labour law
- Workmen's Compensation Act 1897
- Workmen's Compensation Act 1906
