= Statute Law Revision (Consequential Repeals) Act 1965 =

Act of the Parliament of the United Kingdom

Statute Law Revision (Consequential Repeals) Act 1965 (Note: Section 2(1).)
- Act of Parliament
- Parliament of the United Kingdom
- Long title: An Act to repeal certain enactments in consequence of the coming into force of the National Insurance Act 1965, the National Insurance (Industrial Injuries) Act 1965, the Family Allowances Act 1965 and the National Health Service Contributions Act 1965.
- Citation: 1965 c. 55
- Territorial extent: United Kingdom (Note: Section 2(2).)

Dates
- Royal assent: 5 August 1965
- Commencement: 6 September 1965 (Note: Section 2(3). The National Insurance Act 1965 (Commencement) Order 1965 (SI 1965/1650))
- Repealed: 1 October 1986 (Note: The Social Security Act 1986 (Commencement No. 1) Order 1986 (SI 1986/1609).)
Other legislation
Amends	See § Repealed enactments
Repeals/revokes	See § Repealed enactments
Amended by	Statute Law (Repeals) Act 1974
Repealed by	Social Security Act 1986
Relates to	National Insurance Act 1965; National Insurance (Industrial Injuries) Act 1965; Family Allowances Act 1965; National Health Service Contributions Act 1965; Repeal of Obsolete Statutes Act 1956; See Statute Law Revision Act

Status: Repealed

Text of statute as originally enacted

The Statute Law Revision (Consequential Repeals) Act 1965 (c. 55) was an act of the Parliament of the United Kingdom.

== Provisions ==
=== Repealed enactments ===
Section 1(1) of the act repealed 42 enactments, listed in the schedule to the act.

Citation	Short title	Extent of repeal
8 & 9 Geo. 6. c. 41	Family Allowances Act 1945	The whole act.
9 & 10 Geo. 6. c. 62	National Insurance (Industrial Injuries) Act 1946	The whole act except sections 6, 71, 89 and 90 and Schedule 9. In section 90, paragraphs (a) to (h).
9 & 10 Geo. 6. c. 67	National Insurance Act 1946	The whole act except sections 6(4), 55, 68, 70, 74 and 79 and Schedule 11. Section 70 so far as it applies to Great Britain. In section 79, paragraphs (a) to (i) and (k).
10 & 11 Geo. 6. c. 54	Electricity Act 1947	Section 54(6).
11 & 12 Geo. 6. c. 42	National Insurance (Industrial Injuries) Act 1948	The whole act.
11 & 12 Geo. 6. c. 43	Children Act 1948	Section 52.
11 & 12 Geo. 6. c. 67	Gas Act 1948	Section 58(6).
12, 13 & 14 Geo. 6. c. 39	Commonwealth Telegraphs Act 1949	Section 6(6).
12, 13 & 14 Geo. 6. c. 56	National Insurance Act 1949	The whole act.
14 & 15 Geo. 6. c. 11	Administration of Justice (Pensions) Act 1950	Section 1 so far as it relates to the National Insurance Commissioner and the Industrial Injuries Commissioner and their respective deputy Commissioners. In Schedule 2, the amendments to the National Insurance (Industrial Injuries) Act 1946 and the National Insurance Act 1946.
14 & 15 Geo. 6. c. 34	National Insurance Act 1951	The whole act.
15 & 16 Geo. 6 & 1 Eliz. 2. c. 29	Family Allowances and National Insurance Act 1952	The whole act.
1 & 2 Eliz. 2. c. 29	National Insurance Act 1953	The whole act.
1 & 2 Eliz. 2. c. 43	National Insurance (Industrial Injuries) Act 1953	The whole act.
3 & 4 Eliz. 2. c. 29	National Insurance Act 1955	The whole act.
4 & 5 Eliz. 2. c. 19	Friendly Societies Act 1955	Section 9(2) from " and shall " onwards.
4 & 5 Eliz. 2. c. 47	National Insurance Act 1956	The whole act.
4 & 5 Eliz. 2. c. 50	Family Allowances and National Insurance Act 1956	The whole act except section 5. Section 5(3)(b).
4 & 5 Eliz. 2. c. 53	Teachers (Superannuation) Act 1956	Section 24.
5 & 6 Eliz. 2. c. 20	House of Commons Disqualification Act 1957	In Part II of Schedule 1, and in the Part substituted therefor by Schedule 3, the entry " The Panel of Referees constituted for the purposes of section five of the Family Allowances Act 1945 ".
5 & 6 Eliz. 2. c. 26	National Insurance Act 1957	The whole act except section 7(2) and paragraphs 2 and 3 of the Schedule.
5 & 6 Eliz. 2. c. 29	Magistrates' Courts Act 1957	Section 1(4).
5 & 6 Eliz. 2. c. 34	National Health Service Contributions Act 1957	The whole act.
6 & 7 Eliz. 2. c. 1	National Insurance (No. 2) Act 1957	The whole act except sections 3, 4(2) and 8. In section 8(2), paragraphs (a) and (b) and the words from " and without " onwards. In section 8(3), the words from " in the Industrial " to " 1946, or ".
7 & 8 Eliz. 2. c. 5	Adoption Act 1958	Section 36(2)(b).
7 & 8 Eliz. 2. c. 18	Family Allowances and National Insurance Act 1959	The whole act.
7 & 8 Eliz. 2. c. 47	National Insurance Act 1959	The whole act.
8 & 9 Eliz. 2. c. 44	Finance Act 1960	Section 62.
9 & 10 Eliz. 2. c. 5	National Insurance Act 1960	The whole act.
9 & 10 Eliz. 2. c. 13	National Health Service Contributions Act 1961	The whole act.
9 & 10 Eliz. 2. c. 15	Post Office Act 1961	Section 19(2). In the Schedule, the entries relating to the Family Allowances Act 1945, the National Insurance (Industrial Injuries) Act 1946 and the National Insurance Act 1946.
9 & 10 Eliz. 2. c. 36	Finance Act 1961	Section 30. In Schedule 3, in paragraph 1 the words " or section thirty " and in paragraph 2(1) the words " and thirty ". Schedule 5.
9 & 10 Eliz. 2. c. 39	Criminal Justice Act 1961	In Schedule 4, the amendment to the Family Allowances Act 1945.
10 & 11 Eliz. 2. c. 6	Family Allowances and National Insurance Act 1961	The whole act except sections 1, 3(4) and 14(5) and Schedule 1. In section 3(4), the words from " by section eighty-two " to " 1953), or " and the words " regulations or ". In section 14(5), the words " of the Acts referred to in subsection (2) above or ", the word " other " and the words from " except " onwards.
10 & 11 Eliz. 2. c. 46	Transport Act 1962	Section 74(9) from the beginning to " but ".
10 & 11 Eliz. 2. c. 47	Education (Scotland) Act 1962	Section 105(8).
1963 c. 7	National Insurance Act 1963	The whole act except section 5.
1963 c. 37	Children and Young Persons Act 1963	In Schedule 3, paragraph 37.
1963 c. 39	Criminal Justice (Scotland) Act 1963	In Schedule 5, the amendment to the Family Allowances Act 1945.
1964 c. 10	Family Allowances and National Insurance Act 1964	The whole act except section 3(1) and (2).
1964 c. 29	Continental Shelf Act 1964	Section 10.
1964 c. 96	National Insurance &c. Act 1964	The whole act except section 3 and paragraph 18 of Schedule 5.

== Subsequent developments ==
Section 1(1) of, and the schedule to, the act were repealed by section 1 of, and part XI of the schedule to, the Statute Law (Repeals) Act 1974, which came into force on 27 June 1974.

The whole act was repealed by section 86(2) of, and schedule 11 to, the Social Security Act 1986, which came into force on 1 October 1986.

== See also ==
- Statute Law Revision Act

== Bibliography ==
- Halsbury's Statutes,
- John Burke (General editor). Current Law Statutes Annotated 1965. Sweet & Maxwell, Stevens & Sons. London. W Green & Son. Edinburgh. 1965.
- HC Deb vol 717, cols 639 to 640.
