= War Damage Act 1965 =

Act of the Parliament of the United Kingdom

War Damage Act 1965 (Note: Section 2.)
- Act of Parliament
- Parliament of the United Kingdom
- Long title: An Act to abolish rights at common law to compensation in respect of damage to, or destruction of, property effected by, or on the authority of, the Crown during, or in contemplation of the outbreak of, war.
- Citation: 1965 c. 18
- Introduced by: Niall MacDermot (Commons)
- Territorial extent: United Kingdom

Dates
- Royal assent: 2 June 1965
- Commencement: 2 June 1965 (Note: The Acts of Parliament (Commencement) Act 1793.)

Other legislation
- Amended by: Statute Law (Repeals) Act 1995

Status: Amended

Text of statute as originally enacted

Revised text of statute as amended

Text of the War Damage Act 1965 as in force today (including any amendments) within the United Kingdom, from legislation.gov.uk.

The War Damage Act 1965 (c. 18) is an act of the Parliament of the United Kingdom which exempts the Crown from liability in respect of damage to, or destruction of, property caused by acts lawfully done by the Crown during, or in contemplation of the outbreak of, a war in which it is engaged. Enacted in the aftermath of the prominent case Burmah Oil Co. v Lord Advocate, it is a rare piece of British legislation with retroactive effect.

== Provisions ==
The first clause of the act:

Abolition of rights at common law to compensation for certain damage to, or, destruction of, property.
No person shall be entitled at common law to receive from the Crown compensation in respect of damage to, or destruction of, property caused (whether before or after the passing of this Act, within or outside the United Kingdom) by acts lawfully done by, or on the authority of, the Crown during, or in contemplation of the outbreak of, a war in which the Sovereign was, or is, engaged.

A second clause was repealed in 1995. It read:

Where any proceedings to recover at common law compensation in respect of such damage or destruction have been instituted before the passing of this Act, the court shall, on the application of any party, forthwith set aside or dismiss the proceedings, subject only to the determination of any question arising as to costs or expenses.
