= National Health Service Contributions Act 1965 =

Act of the Parliament of the United Kingdom

National Health Service Contributions Act 1965 (Note: Section 9(1).)
- Act of Parliament
- Parliament of the United Kingdom
- Long title: An Act to consolidate the National Health Service Contributions Acts 1957 and 1961 and certain related enactments.
- Citation: 1965 c. 54
- Territorial extent: England and Wales; Scotland; Northern Ireland (sections 6–8).; (Note: Section 9(2))

Dates
- Royal assent: 5 August 1965
- Commencement: 6 September 1965 (Note: Section 9(3). The National Insurance Act 1965 (c. 51) came into force on such day as the Minister appointed by order under section 118(3) of that act.)
- Repealed: 6 April 1975
Other legislation
Repealed by	Social Security Act 1973
Relates to	National Insurance Act 1965; National Insurance (Industrial Injuries) Act 1965; Family Allowances Act 1965; Statute Law Revision (Consequential Repeals) Act 1965

Status: Repealed

Text of statute as originally enacted

The National Health Service Contributions Act 1965 (c. 54) was an act of the Parliament of the United Kingdom that consolidated enactments relating to National Health Service contributions.

The companion National Insurance Act 1965 National Insurance (Industrial Injuries) Act 1965 consolidated the corresponding legislation relating to National Insurance.

The National Insurance Acts 1946 to 1964 consolidated by this act were repealed by the Statute Law Revision (Consequential Repeals) Act 1965, which came into force on the same day as this act.

== Subsequent developments ==
The whole act was repealed by section 100(2)(b) of, and schedule 28 to, the Social Security Act 1973, which came into force on 6 April 1975.
