= Hire-Purchase (Scotland) Act 1965 =

Act of the Parliament of the United Kingdom

Hire-Purchase (Scotland) Act 1965 (Note: Section 58(1).)
- Act of Parliament
- Parliament of the United Kingdom
- Long title: An Act to consolidate certain enactments relating to hire-purchase, credit-sale and conditional sale agreements in Scotland.
- Citation: 1965 c. 67
- Territorial extent: Scotland (Note: Section 58(2).)

Dates
- Royal assent: 5 August 1965
- Commencement: 5 August 1965 (certain provisions) (Note: Section 57(2).); 1 October 1965 (rest of act) (Note: Section 57(1).)
- Repealed: 19 May 1985 (Note: The Consumer Credit Act 1974 (Commencement No. 8) Order 1983 (SI 1983/1551).)
Other legislation
Amends	See § Repealed enactments
Amended by	Supply of Goods (Implied Terms) Act 1973
Repealed by	Consumer Credit Act 1974
Relates to	Hire-Purchase Act 1965

Status: Repealed

Text of statute as originally enacted

The Hire-Purchase (Scotland) Act 1965 (c. 67) was an act of the Parliament of the United Kingdom that consolidated enactments relating to hire-purchase, credit-sale and conditional sale agreements in Scotland.

The Hire-Purchase Act 1965 and the Hire-Purchase Act (Northern Ireland) 1966 made equivalent provisions for England and Wales and Northern Ireland, respectively.

== Provisions ==
=== Repealed enactments ===
Section 55(5) of the act repealed 4 enactments, listed in schedule 6 to the act.

Enactments repealed by section 55(5)
Citation	Short title	Extent of repeal
22 & 23 Geo. 5. c. 38	Hire Purchase and Small Debt (Scotland) Act 1932	In section 11, the words "Hire Purchase and".
3 & 4 Geo. 6. c. 42	Law Reform (Miscellaneous Provisions) (Scotland) Act 1940	Section 4(3).
9 & 10 Eliz. 2. c. 40	Consumer Protection Act 1961	In section 5, the definition of "Act of 1932".
1964 c. 53	Hire-Purchase Act 1964	Part II. Sections 33, 34(2), 35(2), 37(3) and (4). Schedules 1, 2, 5 and 7.

== Subsequent developments ==
The whole act was repealed by section 192(3)(b) of, and part I of schedule 5 to, the Consumer Credit Act 1974, which came into force on 19 May 1985.
