= Hire-Purchase Act 1965 =

Act of the Parliament of the United Kingdom

Hire-Purchase Act 1965 (Note: Section 62(1).)
- Act of Parliament
- Parliament of the United Kingdom
- Long title: An Act to consolidate certain enactments relating to hire-purchase, credit-sale and conditional sale agreements in England and Wales; with corrections and improvements made under the Consolidation of Enactments (Procedure) Act 1949.
- Citation: 1965 c. 66
- Territorial extent: England and Wales (Note: Section 62(2).)

Dates
- Royal assent: 5 August 1965
- Commencement: 1 October 1965 (Note: Section 61(1).)
- Repealed: 19 May 1985 (Note: The Consumer Credit Act 1974 (Commencement No. 8) Order 1983 (SI 1983/1551).)
Other legislation
Amends	See § Repealed enactments
Repeals/revokes	See § Repealed enactments
Amended by	Supply of Goods (Implied Terms) Act 1973
Repealed by	Consumer Credit Act 1974
Relates to	Hire-Purchase (Scotland) Act 1965; [[Hire-Purchase Act (Northern Ireland) 1966]]

Status: Repealed

Text of statute as originally enacted

The Hire-Purchase Act 1965 (c. 66) was an act of the Parliament of the United Kingdom that consolidated enactments relating to hire-purchase, credit-sale and conditional sale agreements in England and Wales.

The Hire-Purchase (Scotland) Act 1965 and the Hire-Purchase Act (Northern Ireland) 1966 made equivalent provisions for Scotland and Northern Ireland, respectively.

== Provisions ==
=== Repealed enactments ===
Section 59 of the act repealed 3 enactments, listed in schedule 6 to the act.

Citation	Short title	Extent of repeal
1 & 2 Geo. 6. c. 53	Hire-Purchase Act 1938	The whole act.
2 & 3 Eliz. 2. c. 51	Hire-Purchase Act 1954	The whole act.
1964 c. 53	Hire-Purchase Act 1964	Part I. Sections 33, 34(2) and (3), 35(1), 37(2) and (4). Schedule 1. Schedule 4, except so much of it as relates to the Advertisements (Hire-Purchase) Act 1957. Schedules 5 and 6.

== Subsequent developments ==
The whole act was repealed by section 192(3)(b) of, and schedule 5 to, the Consumer Credit Act 1974, which came into operation on 19 May 1985.
