= Carriage of Goods by Road Act 1965 =

Act of the Parliament of the United Kingdom

Carriage of Goods by Road Act 1965 (Note: Section 14(1).)
- Act of Parliament
- Parliament of the United Kingdom
- Long title: An Act to give effect to the Convention on the Contract for the International Carriage of Goods by Road signed at Geneva on 19th May 1956; and for purposes connected therewith.
- Citation: 1965 c. 37
- Territorial extent: United Kingdom

Dates
- Royal assent: 5 August 1965
- Commencement: 5 June 1967 (Note: Section 14(4). The Carriage of Goods by Road Act 1965 (Commencement) Order 1967 (SI 1967/819).)

Other legislation
- Amended by: Northern Ireland Constitution Act 1973; Civil Liability (Contribution) Act 1978; Carriage by Air and Road Act 1979; International Transport Conventions Act 1983; Statute Law (Repeals) Act 1993; Arbitration Act 1996

Status: Amended

Text of statute as originally enacted

Revised text of statute as amended

Text of the Carriage of Goods by Road Act 1965 as in force today (including any amendments) within the United Kingdom, from legislation.gov.uk.

The Carriage of Goods by Road Act 1965 (c. 37) is an act of the Parliament of the United Kingdom in order to implement the Convention on the Contract for the International Carriage of Goods by Road of 1956 into British law. The act is often relied upon in cross-border litigation to give jurisdiction to the Courts of the United Kingdom in disputes related to road haulage.
