= National Insurance Act 1965 =

Act of the Parliament of the United Kingdom

National Insurance Act 1965 (Note: Section 118(1).)
- Act of Parliament
- Parliament of the United Kingdom
- Long title: An Act to consolidate the National Insurance Acts 1946 to 1964, certain provisions made by statutory instrument thereunder, and certain related enactments.
- Citation: 1965 c. 51
- Territorial extent: England and Wales; Scotland; Northern Ireland (sections 104, 109, 111 and 117); (Note: Section 118(2).)

Dates
- Royal assent: 5 August 1965
- Commencement: 6 September 1965 (Note: Section 118(3). The National Insurance Act 1965 (Commencement) Order 1965 (SI 1965/1650))
- Repealed: 6 April 1975
Other legislation
Amends	See § Revoked instruments
Amended by	National Insurance Act 1967; Social Security Amendment Act 1974
Repealed by	Social Security (Consequential Provisions) Act 1975
Relates to	National Insurance (Industrial Injuries) Act 1965; Family Allowances Act 1965; National Health Service Contributions Act 1965; Statute Law Revision (Consequential Repeals) Act 1965; Social Security Act 1975; Social Security (Consequential Provisions) Act 1975

Status: Repealed

Text of statute as originally enacted

Revised text of statute as amended

The National Insurance Act 1965 (c. 51) was an act of the Parliament of the United Kingdom that consolidated the National Insurance Acts 1946 to 1964 and certain related enactments, in their application to Great Britain.

The companion National Insurance (Industrial Injuries) Act 1965 consolidated the corresponding legislation relating to industrial injuries.

The National Insurance Acts 1946 to 1964 consolidated by this act were repealed by the Statute Law Revision (Consequential Repeals) Act 1965, which came into force on the same day as this act.

== Provisions ==
=== Revoked instruments ===
Section 116(1) of the act revoked 17 instruments, listed in the schedule 12 to the act.

Citation	Title	Extent of revocation
SI 1948/1041	National Insurance (Claims and Payments) Regulations 1948	In Schedule 2 (as included by virtue of the National Insurance (Claims and Payments) Amendment Regulations 1952 (SI 1952/1207)), paragraph 2 of Part II.
SI 1948/1144	National Insurance (Determination of Claims and Questions) Regulations 1948	Regulation 2, regulation 3(3) so far as it relates to the appointment of persons to hold inquiries and report thereon, and regulations 4(1), (2) and (4), 4(3) from the beginning to "High Court and", 5 to 11, 15, 16(5), (5A) and (5B), 18 and 23.
SI 1948/1274	National Insurance and Industrial Injuries (Collection of Contributions) Regulations 1948	Regulation 7.
SI 1948/1278	National Insurance (General Benefit) Regulations 1948	Regulation 8(3).
SI 1948/1417	National Insurance (Contributions) Regulations 1948	Regulation 19.
SI 1951/1208	National Insurance (Determination of Claims and Questions) Amendment Regulations 1951	The whole regulations.
SI 1954/189	National Insurance (Maternity Benefit and Miscellaneous Provisions) Regulations 1954	Regulations 12 and 19(3).
SI 1955/1788	National Insurance (Determination of Claims and Questions) Amendment Regulations 1955	The whole regulations.
SI 1957/578	National Insurance (Claims and Payments) Amendment Regulations 1957	Regulation 2(2).
SI 1957/1357	National Insurance (Claims and Payments) Amendment (No. 2) Regulations 1957	Regulation 3.
SI 1958/701	National Insurance (Determination of Claims and Questions) Amendment Regulations 1958	Regulation 3 and Schedule 1.
SI 1959/847	National Insurance (Contributions) Amendment Regulations 1959	Regulation 11.
SI 1959/848	National Insurance (Determination of Claims and Questions) Amendment Regulations 1959	Regulation 3.
SI 1959/1154	National Insurance (Determination of Claims and Questions) Amendment (No. 2) Regulations 1959	Regulations 3 to 6 and Schedules 1 to 3.
SI 1959/1157	Family Allowances (Determination of Claims and Questions) Regulations 1959	Regulations 2(2) and 3(1) and so much of the Schedule as reproduces any of the regulations revoked by virtue of paragraph 2 of the twelfth schedule to the act.
SI 1960/1210	National Insurance (Graduated Contributions and Non-participating Employments—Miscellaneous Provisions) Regulations 1960	Regulations 10 and 14(2).
SI 1961/557	National Insurance (Graduated Retirement Benefit and Consequential Provisions) Regulations 1961	In Schedule 2, paragraph 1 of Part II.

== Subsequent developments ==
The whole act was repealed by section 1(2) of, and part I of schedule 1 to, the Social Security (Consequential Provisions) Act 1975, which came into force on 6 April 1975.
