= Dangerous Drugs Act 1920 =

Act of the Parliament of the United Kingdom

Dangerous Drugs Act 1920 (Note: Section 17(1).)
- Act of Parliament
- Parliament of the United Kingdom
- Long title: An Act to regulate the Importation, Exportation, Manufacture, Sale and Use of Opium and other Dangerous Drugs.
- Citation: 10 & 11 Geo. 5. c. 46
- Territorial extent: United Kingdom

Dates
- Royal assent: 16 August 1920
- Commencement: 1 September 1920 (Note: Section 17(2).)
- Repealed: 1 January 1952
Other legislation
Amended by	Dangerous Drugs and Poisons (Amendment) Act 1923; Dangerous Drugs Act 1925; Dangerous Drugs Act 1932; Dangerous Drugs (Amendment) Act 1950
Repealed by	Dangerous Drugs Act 1951

Status: Repealed

Text of statute as originally enacted

The Dangerous Drugs Act 1920 (10 & 11 Geo. 5. c. 46) was an act of the Parliament of the United Kingdom which changed drug addiction, which up to then was treated within the medical profession as a disease, into a penal offence. The former was the view held by the then Assistant Under Secretary of State, Malcolm Delevingne.

The Home Office was charged with implementing the act. In January 1921 the Home Secretary gave 40 days' notice of his intention to issue controls over raw opium, morphine, cocaine, ecgonine and heroin.

The act also said that the export, import, sale, distribution or possession of barbiturates, had to be licensed or authorised by the Home Secretary. This proviso also applied to dilutions of cocaine and morphine, as defined in the lower limits set by the Hague Convention.

The Home Office, in consultation with the Ministry of Health, as a result of the act, produced a series of memoranda for doctors and dentists to explain the requirements of the act. These were known as DD 101's (Memoranda as to the Duties of Doctors and Dentists). These were distributed to doctors, although the memorandi never had any statutory power. One particular memorandum, in 1938, added, for the first time, that maintenance of addicts if only for the 'gratification of addiction is not regarded as a medical need'.

== Subsequent developments ==
The whole act was repealed by section 25(1) of, and the schedule to the Dangerous Drugs Act 1951 (14 & 15 Geo. 6. c. 48) which came into force on 1 January 1952.
