= Redundancy Payments Act 1965 =

Act of the Parliament of the United Kingdom

Redundancy Payments Act 1965 (Note: Section 59(1).)
- Act of Parliament
- Parliament of the United Kingdom
- Long title: An Act to provide for the making by employers of payments to employees in respect of redundancy; to establish a Redundancy Fund and to require employers to pay contributions towards that fund and to enable sums to be paid into that fund out of the Consolidated Fund; to provide for payments to be made out of the Redundancy Fund; to amend the Contracts of Employment Act 1963; to extend the jurisdiction of tribunals established under the Industrial Training Act 1964 and to make further provision as to procedure in relation to such tribunals; to enable certain statutory provisions relating to compensation to be modified in consequence of the provision for payments in respect of redundancy; and for purposes connected with the matters aforesaid.
- Citation: 1965 c. 62
- Territorial extent: England and Wales; Scotland; Northern Ireland (section 58); (Note: Section 59(3).)

Dates
- Royal assent: 5 August 1965
- Commencement: 5 August 1965 (Note: The Acts of Parliament (Commencement) Act 1793.)
- Repealed: 16 November 1989
Other legislation
Amended by	National Loans Act 1968; Contracts of Employment Act 1972
Repealed by	Statute Law (Repeals) Act 1989

Status: Repealed

Text of statute as originally enacted

The Redundancy Payments Act 1965 (c. 62) was an act of the Parliament of the United Kingdom that introduced into UK labour law the principle that after a qualifying period of work, people would have a right to a severance payment in the event of their jobs becoming economically unnecessary to the employer. The functions of the redundancy payment were to internalise the social cost of unemployment to the employer, make employers think more carefully before making people redundant, to compensate the employee for the loss of a job, and to provide a minimum sum of money for the employee in case future employment could not immediately be found. Together with the requirement of statutory minimum notice in the Contracts of Employment Act 1963, and the right to a fair dismissal first found from the Industrial Relations Act 1971, redundancy pay forms one of the three pillars of rights in dismissal.

The RPA 1965 was eventually codified in the Employment Protection (Consolidation) Act 1978, and its provisions are now updated and found in the Employment Rights Act 1996 section 135 ff.

== Subsequent developments ==
The whole act was repealed by section 1(1) of, and group 2 of part II of schedule 1 to, the Statute Law (Repeals) Act 1989, which came into force on 16 November 1989.

== See also ==
- Lesney Products & Co v Nolan [1977] ICR 235
- United Kingdom labour law

== Bibliography ==
- Harry Samuels and N Stewart-Pearson. Redundancy Payments: An Annotation and Guide to the Redundancy Payments Act 1965. Charles Knight & Co. 1965. Second Edition. 1970.
- Michael H Whincup. "The Redundancy Payments Act, 1965". Redundancy and the Law: A Short Guide to the Law on Dismissal with and without Notice, and Rights under the Redundancy Payments Act, 1965. Pergamon Press. First Edition. 1967. Section II. Pages 13 to 71.
- John Burke and Clifford Walsh (eds). "Redundancy Payments Act, 1965". Current Law Statutes Annotated 1965. Sweet & Maxwell. Stevens & Sons. London. W Green & Son. Edinburgh. 1965. Chapter 62. Google
- "The Redundancy Payments Act 1965". Halsbury's Statutes of England. Second Edition. Butterworths & Co (Publishers) Ltd. London. 1966. Volume 45: Continuation Volume 1965: . Page 288 et seq.
- Dorothy Knight. "Redundancy Payments Act, 1965". Contracts of Employment: including Redundancy Payments. Second Edition. Butterworths. London. 1966. Part 2. Paragraph 143 et seq at page 93 et seq.
- "The Redundancy Payments Act, 1965" (1965) Scottish TUC Bulletin. Scan of numbers 383 to 412
- R H Fryer, "The Myths of the Redundancy Payments Act" (1973) 2 Industrial Law Journal 1. Reprinted by University of Warwick. 1973.
- David Metcalf. "An Analysis of the Redundancy Payments Act". (1984) London School of Economics, Centre for Labour Economics. Working Paper No 606.
