= National Insurance (Industrial Injuries) Act 1965 =

Act of the Parliament of the United Kingdom

National Insurance (Industrial Injuries) Act 1965 (Note: Section 88(1).)
- Act of Parliament
- Parliament of the United Kingdom
- Long title: An Act to consolidate the National Insurance (Industrial Injuries) Acts 1946 to 1964 and certain related enactments.
- Citation: 1965 c. 52
- Territorial extent: England and Wales; Scotland; (Note: Section 88(2). Sections 83(5) and 87 also extended to Northern Ireland.)

Dates
- Royal assent: 5 August 1965
- Commencement: 6 September 1965 (Note: Section 88(3). The National Insurance Act 1965 (Commencement) Order 1965 (SI 1965/1650).)
- Repealed: 6 April 1975
Other legislation
Amended by	National Insurance Act 1967
Repealed by	Social Security (Consequential Provisions) Act 1975
Relates to	National Insurance Act 1965; Family Allowances Act 1965; National Health Service Contributions Act 1965; Statute Law Revision (Consequential Repeals) Act 1965

Status: Repealed

Text of statute as originally enacted

The National Insurance (Industrial Injuries) Act 1965 (c. 52) was an act of the Parliament of the United Kingdom that consolidated enactments relating to national insurance against industrial injuries in Great Britain.

The National Insurance Act 1965 consolidated the corresponding legislation not relating to industrial injuries.

The National Insurance (Industrial Injuries) Acts 1946 to 1964 consolidated by this act were repealed by the Statute Law Revision (Consequential Repeals) Act 1965, which came into force on the same day as this act.

== Provisions ==
The act was divided into six parts. Part I (sections 1 to 4) provided for insured persons and contributions, requiring all persons employed in insurable employment to be insured against personal injury caused by accident arising out of and in the course of such employment. Part II (sections 5 to 34) set out the scheme of benefit, comprising injury benefit, disablement benefit (with increases for unemployability, special hardship, constant attendance and hospital treatment), death benefit, and increases of benefit in respect of dependants. Part III (sections 35 to 55) governed the determination of questions and claims, including disablement questions decided by medical boards and medical appeal tribunals and other claims decided by insurance officers, local appeal tribunals or the Commissioner. Part IV (sections 56 to 58) extended the insurance scheme to prescribed diseases and injuries not caused by accidents. Part V (sections 59 to 70) dealt with finance, administration and legal proceedings. Part VI (sections 71 to 88) contained miscellaneous and general provisions, including special provisions for the Crown, mariners, police and other classes of persons.

The act had seven schedules, covering insurable and excepted employments, provisions as to contributions, rates and amounts of benefit, assessment of the extent of disablement, provisions limiting benefit payable in respect of any death, documents exempt from stamp duty, and the constitution of the joint authority.

== Subsequent developments ==
The whole act was repealed by section 1(2) of, and schedule 1 to, the Social Security (Consequential Provisions) Act 1975, which came into force on 6 April 1975.
