= Dangerous Drugs Act 1951 =

Act of the Parliament of the United Kingdom

Dangerous Drugs Act 1951 (Note: Section 26(1).)
- Act of Parliament
- Parliament of the United Kingdom
- Long title: An Act to consolidate the Dangerous Drugs Acts, 1920 to 1950, and section twenty-eight of the Pharmacy and Poisons Act, 1933.
- Citation: 14 & 15 Geo. 6. c. 48
- Territorial extent: United Kingdom

Dates
- Royal assent: 1 August 1951
- Commencement: 1 January 1952 (Note: Section 26(2).)
- Repealed: 2 June 1965
Other legislation
| Amends | See § Repealed enactments |
| Repeals/revokes | See § Repealed enactments |
| Amended by | Customs and Excise Act 1952; Statute Law Revision Act 1963; Dangerous Drugs Act 1964 |
| Repealed by | Dangerous Drugs Act 1965 |

Status: Repealed

Text of statute as originally enacted

The Dangerous Drugs Act 1951 (14 & 15 Geo. 6. c. 48) was an act of the Parliament of the United Kingdom that consolidated enactments relating to dangerous drugs in the United Kingdom.

== Provisions ==
=== Repealed enactments ===
Section 25(1) of the act repealed 6 enactments, listed in the schedule to the act.

| Citation | Short title | Extent of repeal |
|---|---|---|
| 10 & 11 Geo. 5. c. 46 | Dangerous Drugs Act 1920 | The whole act. |
| 13 & 14 Geo. 5. c. 5 | Dangerous Drugs and Poisons (Amendment) Act 1923 | The whole act. |
| 15 & 16 Geo. 5. c. 74 | Dangerous Drugs Act 1925 | The whole act. |
| 22 & 23 Geo. 5. c. 15 | Dangerous Drugs Act 1932 | The whole act. |
| 23 & 24 Geo. 5. c. 25 | Pharmacy and Poisons Act 1933 | Section twenty-eight. |
| 14 & 15 Geo. 6. c. 7 | Dangerous Drugs (Amendment) Act 1950 | The whole act. |

== Subsequent developments ==
The whole act was repealed by section 27(1) of the Dangerous Drugs Act 1965, which came into force on 2 June 1965.
