= Dangerous Drugs Act 1965 =

Act of the Parliament of the United Kingdom

Dangerous Drugs Act 1965 (Note: Section 28.)
- Act of Parliament
- Parliament of the United Kingdom
- Long title: An Act to consolidate the Dangerous Drugs Acts 1951 and 1964.
- Citation: 1965 c. 15
- Territorial extent: United Kingdom

Dates
- Royal assent: 2 June 1965
- Commencement: 2 June 1965 (Note: The Acts of Parliament (Commencement) Act 1793.)
- Repealed: 1 July 1973
Other legislation
Amends	See § Repealed enactments
Repeals/revokes	See § Repealed enactments
Repealed by	Misuse of Drugs Act 1971

Status: Repealed

Text of statute as originally enacted

The Dangerous Drugs Act 1965 (c. 15) was an act of the Parliament of the United Kingdom that consolidated enactments relating to dangerous drugs in the United Kingdom.

== Provisions ==
=== Repealed enactments ===
Section 27(1) of the act repealed 3 enactments, listed in that section.

Citation	Short title	Extent of repeal
14 & 15 Geo. 6. c. 48	Dangerous Drugs Act 1951	The whole act.
15 & 16 Geo. 6 & 1 Eliz. 2. c. 44	Customs and Excise Act 1952	Section 320(3).
1964 c. 36	Dangerous Drugs Act 1964	The whole act.

== Subsequent developments ==
The whole act was repealed by section 39(2) of, and schedule 6 to, the Misuse of Drugs Act 1971, which came into force on 1 July 1973.
