= Solicitors Act =

Stock short title used for UK legislation

Solicitors Act (with its variations) is a stock short title used in the United Kingdom for legislation relating to solicitors.

== List ==
- The Revenue Solicitors Act 1828 (9 Geo. 4. c. 25)
- The Solicitors Act 1837 (7 Will. 4 & 1 Vict. c. 56)
- The Treasury Solicitor Act 1876 (39 & 40 Vict. c. 18)
- The Solicitors (Ireland) Act 1898 (61 & 62 Vict. c. 17)
- The Colonial Solicitors Act 1900 (63 & 64 Vict. c. 14)
- The Solicitors Act 1922 (12 & 13 Geo. 5. c. 57)
- The Solicitors Act 1932 (22 & 23 Geo. 5. c. 37)
- The Solicitors Act 1934 (24 & 25 Geo. 5. c. 45)
- The Solicitors Act (Northern Ireland) 1938
- The Solicitors, Public Notaries, &c., Act 1949 (12, 13 & 14 Geo. 6. c. 21)
- The Solicitors Act 1957 (5 & 6 Eliz. 2. c. 27)
- The Solicitors Act 1965 (c. 31)
- The Solicitors (Amendment) Act 1974 (c. 26)
- The Solicitors Act 1974 (c. 47)
- The Solicitors (Scotland) Act 1933 (23 & 24 Geo. 5. c. 21)
- The Legal Aid and Solicitors (Scotland) Act 1949 (12, 13 & 14 Geo. 6. c. 63)
- The Solicitors (Scotland) Act 1958 (6 & 7 Eliz. 2. c. 28)
- The Solicitors (Scotland) Act 1965 (c. 29)
- The Solicitors (Scotland) Act 1976 (c. 6)
- The Solicitors (Scotland) Act 1980 (c. 46)
- The Solicitors (Scotland) Act 1988 (c. 42)

The Solicitors Acts 1839 to 1894 was the collective title of the following Acts:

- The Solicitors (Clerks) Act 1839 (2 & 3 Vict. c. 33)
- The Solicitors Act 1843 (6 & 7 Vict. c. 73)
- The Solicitors (Clerks) Act 1844 (7 & 8 Vict. c. 86)
- The Solicitors Act 1860 (23 & 24 Vict. c. 127)
- The Attorneys and Solicitors Act 1870 (33 & 34 Vict. c. 28)
- The Solicitors Act 1872 (35 & 36 Vict. c. 81)
- The Solicitors Act 1874 (37 & 38 Vict. c. 68)
- The Solicitors Act 1877 (40 & 41 Vict. c. 25)
- The Legal Practitioners Act 1877 (40 & 41 Vict. c. 62)
- The Solicitors Remuneration Act 1881 (44 & 45 Vict. c. 44)
- The Solicitors Act 1888 (51 & 52 Vict. c. 65)
- The Solicitors Act 1894 (57 & 58 Vict. c. 9)

The Solicitors (Ireland) Acts 1849 to 1881 was the collective title of the following Acts:

- The Solicitors (Ireland) Act 1849 (12 & 13 Vict. c. 53)
- The Solicitors Act 1851 (14 & 15 Vict. c. 88)
- The Attorneys and Solicitors Act (Ireland) 1866 (29 & 30 Vict. c. 84)
- The Attorneys and Solicitors Act 1870 (33 & 34 Vict. c. 28)
- The Solicitors Remuneration Act 1881 (44 & 45 Vict. c. 44)

== See also ==
- List of short titles
