= Solicitors, Public Notaries, &c. Act 1949 =

Act of the Parliament of the United Kingdom

Solicitors, Public Notaries, &c. Act 1949 (Note: Section 2(1).)
- Act of Parliament
- Parliament of the United Kingdom
- Long title: An Act to repeal the enactments requiring certain legal practitioners in Great Britain to take out stamped practising certificates, and to make consequential provision as to their right to practise and other matters.
- Citation: 12, 13 & 14 Geo. 6. c. 21
- Territorial extent: England and Wales; Scotland; (Note: Section 2(3).)

Dates
- Royal assent: 23 March 1949
- Commencement: 1 November 1949 (Note: Section 2(2).)
- Repealed: 1 May 1975 (Note: The Solicitors Acts 1974 (Commencement) Order 1975 (SI 1975/534).)
Other legislation
Amends	See § Repealed enactments
Repeals/revokes	See § Repealed enactments
Amended by	Statute Law (Repeals) Act 1974
Repealed by	Solicitors Act 1974

Status: Repealed

Text of statute as originally enacted

The Solicitors, Public Notaries, &c. Act 1949 (12, 13 & 14 Geo. 6. c. 21) was an act of the Parliament of the United Kingdom that repealed the enactments requiring certain legal practitioners in Great Britain to take out stamped practising certificates, and made consequential provision as to their right to practise and other matters.

== Provisions ==
=== Repealed enactments ===
Section 1(5) of the act repealed 9 enactments, listed in the second schedule to the act.

Enactments repealed by section 1(5)
Citation	Short title	Extent of repeal
23 & 24 Vict. c. 127	Solicitors Act 1860	Sections twenty-two and thirty-four.
33 & 34 Vict. c. 77	Juries Act 1870	In the Schedule, the words "certificated conveyancers and special pleaders".
54 & 55 Vict. c. 39	Stamp Act 1891	Sections forty-three and forty-five to forty-eight; in the First Schedule the heading which begins with the words "Certificate to be taken out yearly".
15 & 16 Geo. 5. c. 21	Land Registration Act 1925	In paragraph (vi) of subsection (1) of section one hundred and forty-four, the words "or certificated conveyancers".
22 & 23 Geo. 5. c. 37	Solicitors Act 1932	In paragraph (5) of section twenty, the words "or a practising certificated special pleader in England"; in section thirty-six, the words "subject to their certificates being duly stamped"; sections thirty-nine and forty; in section forty-one, subsections (2) to (4); in section forty-two, the words "and conveyancers" and the word "stamped"; in section forty-three, the words "duly stamped".
23 & 24 Geo. 5. c. 21	Solicitors (Scotland) Act 1933	Sections eight and forty-seven.
26 Geo. 5 & 1 Edw. 8. c. 35	Solicitors Act 1936	The Schedule so far as it amends section forty-seven of the Solicitors Act, 1932.
4 & 5 Geo. 6. c. 46	Solicitors Act 1941	In section five, in the new subsection (1) of section thirty-seven of the Solicitors Act, 1932, the words from "and (ii) at" to "signed" where next occurring and the words "and a duplicate"; in section ten, in the new section thirty-eight of the Solicitors Act, 1932, the words "duly stamped and" in paragraphs (a) and (d) of subsection (1); section thirteen; subsection (3) of section twenty-three; in Form B in the Second Schedule, the words "on this certificate being duly stamped as required by law" and the words from "Produced to duty"; so much of the Third Schedule as reproduces the following provisions of the Solicitors Act, 1932, namely, subsection (4) of section forty-one, subsection (1) of section forty-seven, section forty-eight and section forty-nine.
10 & 11 Geo. 6. c. 35	Finance Act 1947	Subsection (3) of section fifty-six.

== Subsequent developments ==
Section 1(1) and 1(5) of, in section 2(2), the proviso, and schedule 2 to, the act repealed by section 1 of, and part IV of the schedule to, the Statute Law (Repeals) Act 1974, which came into force on 27 June 1974.

The whole act was repealed by section 89 of, and schedule 4 to, the Solicitors Act 1974, which came into force on 1 May 1975.
