= County Courts Act 1934 =

Act of the Parliament of the United Kingdom

County Courts Act 1934 (Note: Section 193(1).)
- Act of Parliament
- Parliament of the United Kingdom
- Long title: An Act to consolidate certain enactments relating to County Courts.
- Citation: 24 & 25 Geo. 5. c. 53
- Territorial extent: England and Wales (Note: Section 193(2).)

Dates
- Royal assent: 31 July 1934
- Commencement: 1 January 1937 (Note: Section 193(3) provided that the act would come into operation on the first day on which all provisions of the County Courts (Amendment) Act 1934 (24 & 25 Geo. 5. c. 17) had been brought into operation by Orders in Council made under section 35(4) of that act. The County Courts Act 1934 (Date of Commencement) Order 1936 (SR&O 1936/694).)
- Repealed: 21 June 1981
Other legislation
Amends	See § Repealed enactments
Repeals/revokes	See § Repealed enactments
Amended by	Administration of Justice Act 1956; Solicitors Act 1957; County Courts Act 1959; Statute Law Revision Act 1963
Repealed by	Judicial Pensions Act 1981
Relates to	County Courts (Amendment) Act 1934

Status: Repealed

Text of statute as originally enacted

The County Courts Act 1934 (24 & 25 Geo. 5. c. 53) was an act of the Parliament of the United Kingdom that consolidated enactments relating to county courts in England and Wales.

== Provisions ==
=== Repealed enactments ===
Section 193(4) of the act repealed 21 enactments, listed in the fifth schedule to the act.

Citation	Short title	Extent of repeal
20 & 21 Vict. c. 77	Court of Probate Act 1857	Sections fifty-five, fifty-six and fifty-seven.
31 & 32 Vict. c. 71	County Courts Admiralty Jurisdiction Act 1868	The whole act.
32 & 33 Vict. c. 51	County Courts Admiralty Jurisdiction Amendment Act 1869	The whole act.
33 & 34 Vict. c. 15	County Court (Buildings) Act 1870	The whole act.
35 & 36 Vict. c. 51	Judges Salaries Act 1872	The whole act in so far as it relates to judges of county courts.
46 & 47 Vict. c. 52	Bankruptcy Act 1883	Sections forty-two, one hundred and twenty-two, and one hundred and twenty-seven; section one hundred and forty-five in so far as it relates to sales by a high bailiff or other officer of a county court.
51 & 52 Vict. c. 43	County Courts Act 1888	The whole act.
53 & 54 Vict. c. 71	Bankruptcy Act 1890	Section twelve in so far as it relates to sales by a high bailiff or other officer of a county court, and section twenty-eight.
3 Edw. 7. c. 42	County Courts Act 1903	The whole act.
3 & 4 Geo. 5. c. 34	Bankruptcy and Deeds of Arrangement Act 1913	Section fifteen in so far as it relates to sales by a high bailiff or other officer of a county court, and section eighteen.
9 & 10 Geo. 5. c. 70	County Court Judges (Retirement Pensions and Deputies) Act 1919	The whole act.
9 & 10 Geo. 5. c. 73	County Courts Act 1919	The whole act.
10 & 11 Geo. 5. c. cxxxiv	Mayor's and City of London Court Act 1920	Section nine.
10 & 11 Geo. 5. c. 81	Administration of Justice Act 1920	Subsection (2) of section three and section fifteen in so far as they relate to county courts.
14 & 15 Geo. 5. c. 17	County Courts Act 1924	Sections one and two; in subsection (1) of section three the words "in connection with any court such assistant registrars, clerks, bailiffs, ushers and messengers, and," the words "of the court or" and the word "respectively" in both places where that word occurs; subsections (2), (3), (4) and (5) of section three; subsections (3) and (4) of section four, and in subsection (5) the words "as they apply to registrars of county courts"; in subsection (5) of section five the words "a registrar, a high bailiff, or"; sections seven, eight and nine; in subsection (1) of section eleven the words from "and shall" to the end of the subsection; in subsection (2) of section eleven the definitions of "court," "registrar," "the principal Act," "solicitor" and "prescribed," and in the definition of "court service" the words "employment as an assistant registrar or as a clerk, bailiff, usher or messenger in the service of a court or," and the words "and includes employment in those capacities simultaneously"; subsections (3) and (5) of section eleven; paragraph 4 of the First Schedule; and the Second and Third Schedules.
15 & 16 Geo. 5. c. 28	Administration of Justice Act 1925	Section twenty.
15 & 16 Geo. 5. c. 49	Supreme Court of Judicature (Consolidation) Act 1925	Paragraph (k) of subsection (1) of section thirty-one; paragraphs (a) (b) and (c) of subsection (1) of section thirty-three and subsection (3) of that section; in section one hundred and fifty the words from "Provided that" to the end of the section; section two hundred and two in so far as it relates to county courts; sections two hundred and four and two hundred and five.
18 & 19 Geo. 5. c. 26	Administration of Justice Act 1928	Sections seventeen and eighteen; subsection (2) of section nineteen, and Part II of the First Schedule.
23 & 24 Geo. 5. c. 36	Administration of Justice (Miscellaneous Provisions) Act 1933	Subsections (2), (3) and (4) of section four.
24 & 25 Geo. 5. c. 17	County Courts (Amendment) Act 1934	The whole act.
24 & 25 Geo. 5. c. 40	Administration of Justice (Appeals) Act 1934	In subsection (1) of section two the words "Part I of", the words "and the enactments set out in the first column of Part II of the said Schedule" and the words "of those Parts"; subsection (2) of section two; Part I of the Schedule in so far as it relates to section twenty-six of the County Courts Admiralty Jurisdiction Act 1868, to section one hundred and twenty of the County Courts Act 1888, and to section fifteen of the County Courts (Amendment) Act 1934; and Parts II and III of the Schedule.

== Subsequent developments ==
The act was substantially repealed by section 204 of, and the third schedule to, the County Courts Act 1959 (7 & 8 Eliz. 2. c. 22), which came into operation on 1 October 1959, with the exception of sections nine, twenty-one and twenty-nine, section one hundred and ninety-one (so far as it relates to the definition of "Superannuation Acts"), section one hundred and ninety-three and the first schedule.

The whole act was repealed by section 36(2) of, and schedule 4 to, the Judicial Pensions Act 1981, which came into force on 21 June 1981.
