= County Courts Act 1888 =

Act of the Parliament of the United Kingdom

County Courts Act 1888 (Note: Section 1.)
- Act of Parliament
- Parliament of the United Kingdom
- Long title: An Act to consolidate and amend the County Courts Acts.
- Citation: 51 & 52 Vict. c. 43
- Introduced by: Hardinge Giffard, 1st Baron Halsbury (Lords)
- Territorial extent: England and Wales (Note: Section 3.)

Dates
- Royal assent: 13 August 1888
- Commencement: 1 January 1889 (Note: Section 2.)
- Repealed: 1 January 1937
Other legislation
Amends	See § Repealed enactments
Repeals/revokes	See § Repealed enactments
Amended by	Public Authorities Protection Act 1893; Forgery Act 1913
Repealed by	County Courts Act 1934

Status: Repealed

History of passage through Parliament

Records of Parliamentary debate relating to the statute from Hansard

Text of statute as originally enacted

The County Courts Act 1888 (51 & 52 Vict. c. 43) was an act of the Parliament of the United Kingdom that amended and consolidated the law relating to county courts in England and Wales.

== Passage ==
The County Courts Consolidation Bill had its first reading in the House of Lords on 10 February 1888, presented by the Lord Chancellor, Hardinge Giffard, 1st Baron Halsbury. The bill had its second reading in the House of Lords on 28 February 1888 and was committed to a committee of the whole house, which met on 6 March 1888, without amendments. The bill had its third reading in the House of Lords on 9 March 1888 and passed, without amendments.

The bill had its first reading in the House of Commons on 15 March 1888. The bill had its second reading in the House of Commons on 26 March 1888 and was committed to a committee of the whole house. The committee was discharged on 5 April 1888 and the bill was committed to the Standing Committee on Law, Courts of Justice, and Legal Procedure, which reported on 14 May 1888, with amendments and a change to the title of the bill to the County Courts Consolidation and Amendment Bill. The amended bill was re-committed to a committee of the whole house, which met and reported on 10 August 1888, with amendments. The amended bill had its third reading in the House of Commons on 10 August 1888 and passed, with amendments.

The amended bill was considered and agreed to by the House of Lords on 11 August 1888.

The bill was granted royal assent on 13 August 1888.

== Provisions ==
=== Repealed enactments ===
Section 188 of the act repealed 15 enactments, listed in the schedule to the act. Section 188 of the act also provided that the repeals would not affect any orders in council, appointments, anything done, rights, privileges, obligations or liabilities accrued or any legal proceedings done under the repealed enactments.

Citation	Short Title	Title	Extent of repeal
9 & 10 Vict. c. 95	County Courts Act 1846	An Act for the more easy Recovery of Small Debts and Demands in England.	The whole act.
12 & 13 Vict. c. 101	County Courts Act 1849	An Act to amend the Act for the more easy Recovery of Small Debts and Demands in England, and to abolish certain Inferior Courts of Record.	The whole act.
13 & 14 Vict. c. 61	County Courts Act 1850	An Act to extend the Act for the more easy Recovery of Small Debts and Demands in England.	The whole act.
15 & 16 Vict. c. 54	County Courts Act 1852	An Act further to facilitate and arrange Proceedings in the County Courts.	The whole act.
19 & 20 Vict. c. 108	County Courts Act 1856	An Act to amend the Acts relating to the County Courts.	The whole act.
20 & 21 Vict. c. 36	County Courts Act 1857	An Act to supply an omission in a schedule to the Act to amend the Acts relating to the County Courts.	The whole act.
21 & 22 Vict. c. 74	County Courts Act 1858	An Act for the Re-arrangement of the Districts of the County Courts among the Judges thereof.	The whole act.
22 Vict. c. 8	County Courts Westminster and Southwark Act 1859	An Act to repeal the thirty-second section of the Act for the more easy recovery of small debts and demands in England, and to make further provision in lieu thereof.	The whole act.
25 & 26 Vict. c. 99. s. 4	Bankruptcy Amendment Act 1862	An Act to amend the Bankruptcy Act, 1861.	Section 4.
28 & 29 Vict. c. 99	County Courts Act 1865	An Act to confer on the County Courts a limited Jurisdiction in Equity.	The whole act.
29 & 30 Vict. c. 14	County Courts Act 1866	An Act for the Abolition of the Offices of Treasurer and of High Bailiffs of County Courts as Vacancies shall occur, and to provide for the Payment of future Registrars of County Courts.	The whole act.
30 & 31 Vict. c. 142	County Courts Act 1867	An Act to amend the Acts relating to the Jurisdiction of the County Courts.	The whole act.
38 & 39 Vict. c. 50	County Courts Act 1875	An Act to amend the Acts relating to the County Courts.	The whole act.
45 & 46 Vict. c. 57	County Courts (Costs and Salaries) Act 1882	An Act to amend the law relating to Costs and Salaries in County Courts.	The whole act.
50 & 51 Vict. c. 3	County Courts (Expenses) Act 1887	An Act to amend the Acts relating to County Courts, so far as regards the payment of certain expenses connected with the County Courts.	The whole act.

== Subsequent developments ==
The act was described as a consolidation act.

Section 53 of the act was repealed by section 2 of, and the schedule to, the Public Authorities Protection Act 1893 (56 & 57 Vict. c. 61), which came into force on 1 January 1894.

The whole act was repealed by section 193(4) of, and the fifth schedule to, the County Courts Act 1934 (24 & 25 Geo. 5. c. 53), which came into force on 1 January 1937.
