= Solicitors Act 1957 =

Act of the Parliament of the United Kingdom

Solicitors Act 1957 (Note: Section 89(1).)
- Act of Parliament
- Parliament of the United Kingdom
- Long title: An Act to consolidate the Solicitors Acts, 1932 to 1956, and certain other enactments relating to solicitors, with corrections and improvements made under the Consolidation of Enactments (Procedure) Act, 1949.
- Citation: 5 & 6 Eliz. 2. c. 27
- Territorial extent: England and Wales (Note: Section 89(3)–(4).)

Dates
- Royal assent: 6 June 1957
- Commencement: 15 July 1957 (Note: Section 89(2).)
- Repealed: 1 May 1975

Other legislation
- Amends: See § Repealed enactments
- Repeals/revokes: See § Repealed enactments
- Amended by: Solicitors Act 1965; Justices of the Peace Act 1968; Statute Law (Repeals) Act 1969; Legal Aid Act 1974
- Repealed by: Solicitors Act 1974
- Relates to: Solicitors (Scotland) Act 1933

Status: Repealed

Text of statute as originally enacted

The Solicitors Act 1957 (5 & 6 Eliz. 2. c. 27) was an act of the Parliament of the United Kingdom that consolidated enactments relating to solicitors in England and Wales.

== Provisions ==
=== Repealed enactments ===
Section 88(1) of the act repealed 13 enactments, listed in the third schedule to the act.

Citation	Short title	Extent of repeal
15 & 16 Geo. 5. c. 49	Supreme Court of Judicature (Consolidation) Act 1925	Subsection (1) of section two hundred and fifteen.
22 & 23 Geo. 5. c. 37	Solicitors Act 1932	The whole act..
23 & 24 Geo. 5. c. 24	Solicitors Act 1933	The whole act..
24 & 25 Geo. 5. c. 45	Solicitors Act 1934	In section one, subsection (1), in subsection (2) the words from "in sections forty-five" to "1932 and", and subsection (3); in section two, in subsection (1) the words from "as it applies to England" to "to Scotland" and subsection (2).
24 & 25 Geo. 5. c. 53	County Courts Act 1934	Section one hundred and eighty-two from "and a" onwards; and section one hundred and eighty-four.
26 Geo. 5 & 1 Edw. 8. c. 35	Solicitors Act 1936	The whole act. except section fourteen.
2 & 3 Geo. 6. c. 110	Solicitors (Disciplinary Committee) Act 1939	The whole act..
4 & 5 Geo. 6. c. 46	Solicitors Act 1941	The whole act..
12, 13 & 14 Geo. 6. c. 21	Solicitors, Public Notaries, &c., Act 1949	Subsections (2) and (4) of section one and the First Schedule.
12, 13 & 14 Geo. 6. c. 101	Justices of the Peace Act 1949	Section seven.
14 & 15 Geo. 6. c. 6	Solicitors Act 1950	The whole act..
4 & 5 Eliz. 2. c. 8	County Courts Act 1955	Sub-paragraph (e) of paragraph 1 of the First Schedule.
4 & 5 Eliz. 2. c. 41	Solicitors (Amendment) Act 1956	The whole act. except subsection (4) of section two and paragraph 5 of the First Schedule.

== Subsequent developments ==
The whole act was repealed by section 89(2) of, and schedule 4 to, the Solicitors Act 1974, which came into force on 1 May 1975.
