= Solicitors Act 1843 =

Act of the Parliament of the United Kingdom

Solicitors Act 1843 (Note: The citation of this act by this short title was authorised by section 1 of, and the first schedule to, the Short Titles Act 1896. Due to the repeal of those provisions it is now authorised by section 19(2) of the Interpretation Act 1978.)
- Act of Parliament
- Parliament of the United Kingdom
- Long title: An Act for consolidating and amending several of the Laws relating to Attornies and Solicitors practising in England and Wales.
- Citation: 6 & 7 Vict. c. 73
- Territorial extent: England and Wales (Note: Section 1.)

Dates
- Royal assent: 22 August 1843
- Commencement: 22 August 1843
- Repealed: 1 October 1932
Other legislation
Amends	See § Repealed enactments
Repeals/revokes	See § Repealed enactments
Repealed by	Solicitors Act 1932
Relates to	Solicitors (Ireland) Act 1849; Repeal of Obsolete Statutes Act 1856; Promissory Oaths Act 1871; Statute Law Revision (Ireland) Act 1872; Statute Law Revision Act 1874; Statute Law Revision Act 1891

Status: Repealed

Text of statute as originally enacted

The Solicitors Act 1843 (6 & 7 Vict. c. 73) was an act of the Parliament of the United Kingdom that consolidated enactments relating to solicitors in England and Wales.

== Provisions ==
=== Repealed enactments ===
Section 1 of the act repealed 32 enactments, listed in the first part of the first schedule to the act. The second part of the first schedule to the act listed enactments explicitly not repealed by the act.

Citation	Short title	Long Title	Extent of repeal.
15 Edw. 2. c. 1	Statutum de Finibus et Attornatis	An Act concerning the Acknowledgment of Fines, and admitting Attornies.	So much as relates to regulating the Admission of Attornies.
4 Hen. 4. c. 18	Attorneys	An Act for regulating Attornies	The whole act.
4 Hen. 4. c. 19	Attorneys	An Act for providing that an Officer of a Lord of a Franchise shall be Attorney within the same.	The whole act.
1 Hen. 5. c. 4	Bailiffs of sheriffs, etc.	An Act as to Sheriffs, Bailiffs, &c.	So much as provides that no Under Sheriff shall be Attorney in the King's Courts during the Time he is in office.
18 Hen. 6. c. 9	Appearance of Plaintiffs	An Act touching filing Warrants of Attorney	The whole act.
33 Hen. 6. c. 7	Attorneys	An Act for regulating the Number of Attornies in Norfolk, Suffolk, and Norwich.	The whole act.
32 Hen. 8. c. 30	Mispleadings, Jeofails, etc. Act 1540	An Act concerning Mispleading, Jeofails, and	So much as relates to entering Warrants of Attorney.
18 Eliz. 1. c. 14	Jeofails Act 1575	An Act for Reformation of Jeofails	So much as relates to filing Warrants of Attorney. I.e., section 3.
3 Jas. 1. c. 7	Attorneys Act 1605	An Act to reform the Multitudes and Misdemeanors of Attornies and Solicitors at Law, and to avoid unnecessary Suits and Charges in Law.	The whole act.
4 & 5 Ann. c. 3 (Note: This is the citation in The Statutes of the Realm.)	Administration of Justice Act 1705	An Act for the Amendment of the Law, and the better Advancement of Justice.	So much as relates to the filing Warrants of Attorney.
2 Geo. 2. c. 23	Attorneys and Solicitors Act 1728	An Act for the better Regulation of Attornies and Solicitors.	The whole act.
5 Geo. 2. c. 18	Justices Qualification Act 1731	An Act for the further Qualification of Justices of the Peace.	So much as excludes Attornies and Solicitors from acting as Justices of the Peace.
6 Geo. 2. c. 27	Attorneys and Solicitors Act 1732	An Act to explain and amend an Act made in the Second Year of His present Majesty's Reign, intituled "An Act for the better Regulation of Attornies and Solicitors."	The whole act.
12 Geo. 2. c. 13	Price of Bread, etc. Act 1738	An Act for continuing an Act made in the Eighth Year of Her late Majesty Queen Anne, to regulate the Price and Assize of Bread; and for continuing, explaining, and amending the Act made in the Second Year of the Reign of His present Majesty, for the better Regulation of Attornies and Solicitors.	So much as relates to Attornies and Solicitors.
22 Geo. 2. c. 46	Continuance of Laws, etc. Act 1748	An Act to continue several Laws for preventing Exactions of the Occupiers of Locks and Weirs upon the River Thames Westward, and for ascertaining the Rates of Water Carriage upon the said River; and for continuing, explaining, and amending the several Laws for the better Regulation of Attornies and Solicitors, and for the regulating the Price and A-size of Bread, and for preventing the spreading of the Distemper amongst horned Cattle; and also for making further Regulations with respect to Attornies and Solicitors, and further preventing the spreading of the Distemper amongst horned Cattle, and for the more frequent Return of Writs in the Counties Palatine of Chester and Lancaster; and for ascertaining the Method of levying Writs of Execution against the Inhabitants of Hundreds; and for allowing Quakers to make Affirmation where an Oath is or shall be required.	So much as relates to Attornies and Solicitors.
23 Geo. 2. c. 26	Continuance of Laws, etc. Act 1749	An Act to continue several Laws for the better Regulation of Pilots, for the conducting of Ships and Vessels from Dover, Deal, and Isle of Thanet, up the River Thames and Medway; and for permitting Rum and Spirits of the British Sugar Plantations to be landed before the Duties of Excise are paid thereon; and to continue and amend an Act for the preventing Frauds in the Admeasurement of Coals in the City and Liberty of Westminster, and several Parishes near thereunto; and to continue several Laws for preventing Exactions of Occupiers of Locks and Weirs upon the River Thames Westward, and for ascertaining the Rates of Water Carriage upon the said River; and for the better regulating and Government of Seamen in the Merchant Service; and also to amend so much of an Act made in the First Year of the Reign of King George the First as relates to the better Preservation of Salmon in the River Ribble; and to regulate Fees in Trials at Assizes in Nisi Prius upon Records issuing out of the Office of Pleas of the Court of Exchequer; and for the apprehending of Persons in any County or Place upon Warrants granted by Justices of the Peace in any other County or Place; and to repeal so much of an Act made in the Twelfth Year of the Reign of King Charles the Second as relates to the Time during which the Office of the Excise is to be kept upon each Day, and to appoint for how long Time the same shall be kept open upon each Day for the future; and to prevent the stealing and destroying of Turnips; and to amend an Act made in the Second Year of His present Majesty, for the better Regulation of Attornies and Solicitors.	So much as relates to Attornies and Solicitors.
30 Geo. 2. c. 19	National Debt Act 1757	An Act for granting to His Majesty several Rates and Duties upon Indentures, Leases, Bonds, and other Deeds; and upon Newspapers, Advertisements, and Almanacks; and upon Licences for retailing Wine; and upon Coals exported to Foreign Parts; and for applying, from a certain Time, the Sums of Money arising from the Surplus of the Duties on Licences for retailing Spirituous Liquors; and for raising the Sum of Three Millions by Annuities, to be charged on the said Rates, Duties, and Sums of Money; and for making perpetual an Act made in the Second Year of the Reign of His present Majesty, intituled "An Act for the better Regulation of Attornies and Solicitors;" and for enlarging the Time for filing Affidavits of the Execution of Contracts of Clerks to Attornies and Solicitors, and also the Time for Payment of the Duties omitted to be paid for the Indentures and Contracts of Clerks and Apprentices.	So much as enacts that the said Act made in the Second Year of His said Majesty's Reign, intituled "An Act for the better Regulation of Attornies and Solicitors," should be continued and made perpetual.
37 Geo. 3. c. 90	Stamps (No. 2) Act 1797	An Act for granting to His Majesty certain Stamp Duties on the several Matters therein mentioned, and for better securing the Duties on Certificates to be taken out by Solicitors, Attornies, and others.	So much as renders every Person admitted an Attorney or Solicitor in any of the Courts therein mentioned or referred to, who shall neglect for One whole Year to obtain such Certificate as therein mentioned, incapable of practising, and directs that the Admission of such Person in any of the Courts shall be null and void; and so much as enacts that every Certificate to be obtained under the same Act shall be entered in One of the Courts in which the Person described therein shall be admitted, enrolled, sworn, or registered.
1 & 2 Geo. 4. c. 48	Solicitors (Ireland) Act 1821	An Act to amend the several Acts for the Regulation of Attornies and Solicitors.	The whole, except so far as the Attornies and Solicitors of Ireland are affected thereby.
3 Geo. 4. c. 16	Solicitors (Ireland) Act 1822	An Act to amend an Act made in the last Session of Parliament for amending the several Acts for the Regulation of Attornies and Solicitors.	The whole, except so far as the Attornies and Solicitors of Ireland are affected thereby.
1 & 2 Will. 4. c. 56	Bankruptcy Court (England) Act 1831	An Act to establish a Court of Bankruptcy	So much as relates to the Admission and practising of Attornies and Solicitors in the said Courts.
5 & 6 Will. 4. c. 11	Indemnity Act 1835	An Act to indemnify such Persons in the United Kingdom as have omitted to qualify themselves for Offices and Employments, and for extending the Time limited for those Purposes respectively until the Twenty-fifth Day of March One thousand eight hundred and thirty-six; to permit such Persons in Great Britain as have omitted to make and file Affidavits of the Execution of Indenture of Clerks to Attornies and Solicitors to make and file the same on or before the First Day of Hilary Term One thousand eight hundred and thirty-six; and to allow Persons to make and file such Affidavits although the Persons whom they served shall have neglected to take out their annual Certificates.	So much as relates to the Service of any Clerk and his Admission and Allowance as an Attorney or Solicitor, or as to striking any Person off the Roll.
6 & 7 Will. 4. c. 7.	Indemnity Act 1836	An Act to indemnify such Persons in the United Kingdom as have omitted to qualify themselves for Offices and Employments, and for extending the Time limited for those Purposes respectively until the Twenty-fifth Day of March One thousand eight hundred and thirty-seven; to permit such Persons in Great Britain as have omitted to make and file Affidavits of the Execution of Indentures of Clerks to Attornies and Solicitors to make and file the same on or before the First Day of Hilary Term One thousand eight hundred and thirty-seven; and to allow Persons to make and file such Affidavits although the Persons whom they served shall have neglected to take out their annual Certificates.	So much as relates to striking any Attorney or Solicitor off the Roll.
7 Will. 4 & 1 Vict. c. 56	Solicitors Act 1837	An Act for amending the several Acts for the Regulation of Attornies and Solicitors.	The whole act.
1 & 2 Vict. c. 45	Common Law Procedure Act 1838	An Act to extend the Jurisdiction of the Superior Courts of Common Law; to amend Chapter Fifty-six of the First Year of Her present Majesty's Reign, for regulating the Admission of Attornies; and to provide for the taking of Special Bail in the Absence of the Judges.	So much as relates to the Admission and practising of Attornies and Solicitors
7 Will. 4. c. 12	Indemnity Act 1837	An Act to indemnify, &c.	So much as relates to striking any Attorney or Solicitor off the Roll.
1 & 2 Vict. c. 16	Indemnity Act 1838	Ditto	So much as relates to striking any Attorney or Solicitor off the Roll.
2 & 3 Vict. c. 33	Solicitors (Clerks) Act 1839	Ditto	So much as relates to striking any Attorney or Solicitor off the Roll.
3 & 4 Vict. c. 16	Indemnity Act 1840	Ditto	So much as relates to striking any Attorney or Solicitor off the Roll.
4 & 5 Vict. c. 11	Indemnity Act 1841	Ditto	So much as relates to striking any Attorney or Solicitor off the Roll.
5 & 6 Vict.. c. 10	Indemnity Act 1842	Ditto	So much as relates to striking any Attorney or Solicitor off the Roll.
6 & 7 Vict. c. 9	Indemnity Act 1843	Ditto	So much as relates to striking any Attorney or Solicitor off the Roll.

== Subsequent developments ==
Due to the limited territorial extent of the act, several enactments were repealed for Ireland by subsequent statute law revision acts, including:

- The Repeal of Obsolete Statutes Act 1856 (19 & 20 Vict. c. 64)
- The Promissory Oaths Act 1871 (34 & 35 Vict. c. 48)
- The Statute Law Revision (Ireland) Act 1872 (35 & 36 Vict. c. 98)
- The Statute Law Revision Act 1874 (37 & 38 Vict. c. 35)
- The Statute Law Revision Act 1891 (54 & 55 Vict. c. 67)

The whole act was repealed by section 82(1) of, and the fourth schedule to, the Solicitors Act 1932 (22 & 23 Geo. 5. c. 37), which came into force on 1 October 1932.
