= Solicitors (Scotland) Act 1980 =

Act of the Parliament of the United Kingdom

Solicitors (Scotland) Act 1980 (Note: Section 67(1).)
- Act of Parliament
- Parliament of the United Kingdom
- Long title: An Act to consolidate certain enactments relating to solicitors and notaries public in Scotland.
- Citation: 1980 c. 46
- Territorial extent: Scotland (Note: Section 67(2).)

Dates
- Royal assent: 1 August 1980
- Commencement: 1 September 1980 (Note: Section 67(3).)

Other legislation
- Amends: See § Repealed enactments
- Repeals/revokes: See § Repealed enactments
- Amended by: Law Reform (Miscellaneous Provisions) (Scotland) Act 1980; Law Reform (Miscellaneous Provisions) (Scotland) Act 1985; Solicitors (Scotland) Act 1988; Law Reform (Miscellaneous Provisions) (Scotland) Act 1990; Requirements of Writing (Scotland) Act 1995; Criminal Procedure (Consequential Provisions) (Scotland) Act 1995; Scotland Act 1998 (Consequential Modifications) (No. 1) Order 1999; Scotland Act 1998 (Consequential Modifications) (No. 2) Order 1999; Adults with Incapacity (Scotland) Act 2000; European Communities (Lawyer's Practice) (Scotland) Regulations 2000; Public Appointments and Public Bodies etc. (Scotland) Act 2003; Council of the Law Society of Scotland Act 2003; Enterprise Act 2002 (Consequential and Supplemental Provisions) Order 2003; Solicitors (Scotland) Act 1980 (Foreign Lawyers and Multi-national Practices) Regulations 2004; Solicitors (Scotland) Act 1980 (Compensation for Inadequate Professional Services) Order 2004; Constitutional Reform Act 2005; Mental Health (Care and Treatment) (Scotland) Act 2003 (Modification of Enactments) Order 2005; Consumer Credit Act 2006; Employment Equality (Age) Regulations 2006; Legal Profession and Legal Aid (Scotland) Act 2007; Adult Support and Protection (Scotland) Act 2007; Legal Services Act 2007; Home Owner and Debtor Protection (Scotland) Act 2010; Legal Services (Scotland) Act 2010; Legal Profession and Legal Aid (Scotland) Act 2007 (Modification and Consequential Provisions) Order 2011; Treaty of Lisbon (Changes in Terminology) Order 2011; Legal Services (Scotland) Act 2010 (Ancillary Provision) Regulations 2012; Enterprise and Regulatory Reform Act 2013; Scottish Legal Complaints Commission (Modification of Duties and Powers) Regulations 2014; Money Laundering, Terrorist Financing and Transfer of Funds (Information on the Payer) Regulations 2017; Oversight of Professional Body Anti-Money Laundering and Counter Terrorist Financing Supervision Regulations 2017; Civil Litigation (Expenses and Group Proceedings) (Scotland) Act 2018; Money Laundering and Terrorist Financing (Miscellaneous Amendments) Regulations 2018; Services of Lawyers and Lawyer's Practice (EU Exit) (Scotland) (Amendment etc.) Regulations 2019; Economic Crime and Corporate Transparency Act 2023; Regulation of Legal Services (Scotland) Act 2025

Status: Amended

Text of statute as originally enacted

Revised text of statute as amended

Text of the Solicitors (Scotland) Act 1980 as in force today (including any amendments) within the United Kingdom, from legislation.gov.uk.

The Solicitors (Scotland) Act 1980 (c. 46) is an act of the Parliament of the United Kingdom that consolidated enactments relating to solicitors and notaries public in Scotland.

== Provisions ==
=== Repealed enactments ===
Section 66(2) of the act repealed 6 enactments, listed in schedule 7 to the act.

Enactments repealed by section 66(2)
Citation	Short title	Extent of repeal
23 & 24 Geo. 5. c. 21	Solicitors (Scotland) Act 1933	The whole act.
24 & 25 Geo. 5. c. 45	Solicitors Act 1934	The whole act.
12 & 13 Geo. 6. c. 63	Legal Aid and Solicitors (Scotland) Act 1949	Part II and Schedules 4 to 7 except section 25(1), (1A), (3), (4), (5).
6 & 7 Eliz. 2. c. 28	Solicitors (Scotland) Act 1958	The whole act.
1965 c. 29	Solicitors (Scotland) Act 1965	The whole act.
1976 c. 6	Solicitors (Scotland) Act 1976	The whole act except section 9.
