= Solicitors Act 1974 =

Act of the Parliament of the United Kingdom

Solicitors Act 1974 (Note: Section 90(1).)
- Act of Parliament
- Parliament of the United Kingdom
- Long title: An Act to consolidate the Solicitors Acts 1957 to 1974 and certain other enactments relating to solicitors.
- Citation: 1974 c. 47
- Introduced by: Lord Elwyn-Jones (Lords)
- Territorial extent: England and Wales; Scotland (in part); Northern Ireland (in part); (Note: Section 90(4).)

Dates
- Royal assent: 31 July 1974
- Commencement: 1 May 1975 (Note: Section 90(2). The Solicitors Acts 1974 (Commencement) Order 1975 (SI 1975/534).)

Other legislation
- Amends: Act of Settlement 1701; See § Repealed enactments
- Repeals/revokes: See § Repealed enactments
- Amended by: House of Commons Disqualification Act 1975; Interpretation Act 1978; Magistrates' Courts Act 1980; Forgery and Counterfeiting Act 1981; Senior Courts Act 1981; Criminal Justice Act 1982; Administration of Justice Act 1985; Building Societies Act 1986; Legal Aid Act 1988; Law of Property (Miscellaneous Provisions) Act 1989; Statute Law (Repeals) Act 1989; Government Trading Act 1990; Statute Law (Repeals) Act 1993; Courts and Legal Services Act 1990; Trade Marks Act 1994; Insurance Companies (Third Insurance Directives) Regulations 1994; Agricultural Tenancies Act 1995; Arbitration Act 1996; Justices of the Peace Act 1997; Building Societies Act 1997; Access to Justice Act 1999; Land Registration Act 2002; Courts Act 2003; Secretary of State for Constitutional Affairs Order 2003; European Communities (Services of Lawyers) (Amendment) Order 2004; European Communities (Lawyer's Practice) (Amendment) Regulations 2004; Constitutional Reform Act 2005; Mental Capacity Act 2005; Serious Organised Crime and Police Act 2005; Solicitors (Compensation for Inadequate Professional Services) Order 2005; Legal Services Act 2007; Legal Services Act 2007 (Registered European Lawyers) Order 2009; Companies Act 2006 (Consequential Amendments, Transitional Provisions and Savings) Order 2009; Postal Services Act 2011; Legal Aid, Sentencing and Punishment of Offenders Act 2012; Financial Services Act 2012; Tribunals, Courts and Enforcement Act 2007 (Consequential Amendments) Order 2012; Statute Law (Repeals) Act 2013; Crime and Courts Act 2013; Crime and Courts Act 2013 (Family Court: Consequential Provision) Order 2014; Legal Services Act 2007 (The Law Society) (Modification of Functions) Order 2015; Enterprise and Regulatory Reform Act 2013 (Consequential Amendments) (Bankruptcy) and the Small Business, Enterprise and Employment Act 2015 (Consequential Amendments) Regulations 2016; Insolvency (England and Wales) Rules 2016 (Consequential Amendments and Savings) Rules 2017; Courts and Tribunals (Judiciary and Functions of Staff) Act 2018; EEA Passport Rights (Amendment, etc., and Transitional Provisions) (EU Exit) Regulations 2018; Sentencing Act 2020; Criminal Justice Act 2003 (Commencement No. 33) and Sentencing Act 2020 (Commencement No. 2) Regulations 2022; Solicitors Act 1974 and Administration of Justice Act 1985 (Amendment) Order 2022; Economic Crime and Corporate Transparency Act 2023; Judicial Review and Courts Act 2022 (Magistrates' Court Sentencing Powers) Regulations 2023; Recognition of Professional Qualifications and Implementation of International Recognition Agreements (Amendment) (Extension to Switzerland etc.) Regulations 2024

Status: Amended

Text of statute as originally enacted

Revised text of statute as amended

Text of the Solicitors Act 1974 as in force today (including any amendments) within the United Kingdom, from legislation.gov.uk.

The Solicitors Act 1974 (c. 47) is an act of the Parliament of the United Kingdom governing the regulation and responsibilities of practicing solicitors, and the firms for whom they work, as well as stipulating under what circumstances one can practise as a solicitor. It also sets out the powers used by the solicitors governing body, the Solicitors Regulation Authority.

The act reserves certain activities for solicitors. Broadly, these include:

- Preparing and lodging certain documents concerning the conveyance or charging of land; Since repealed.
- Certain probate functions
- Undertaking litigation in open court

== Provisions ==
=== Repealed enactments ===
Section 89(2) of the act repealed 8 enactments, listed in schedule 4 to the act.

Enactments repealed by section 89(2)
Citation	Short title	Extent of repeal
12 & 13 Geo. 6. c. 21	Solicitors, Public Notaries, &c., Act 1949	The whole act.
5 & 6 Eliz. 2. c. 27	Solicitors Act 1957	The whole act.
1965 c. 31	Solicitors Act 1965	The whole act.
1969 c. 58	Administration of Justice Act 1969	In Schedule 1, the entry relating to the Solicitors Act 1957.
1973 c. 14	Costs in Criminal Cases Act 1973	In Schedule 1, paragraph 2.
1973 c. 15	Administration of Justice Act 1973	Section 4.
1973 c. 15	Administration of Justice Act 1973	In Schedule 1, paragraph 9(2).
1973 c. 62	Powers of Criminal Courts Act 1973	In Schedule 5, paragraph 9.
1974 c. 26	Solicitors (Amendment) Act 1974	The whole act.

== See also ==
- Solicitors Act
