= Solicitors Act 1932 =

Act of the Parliament of the United Kingdom

Solicitors Act 1932 (Note: Section 83(1).)
- Act of Parliament
- Parliament of the United Kingdom
- Long title: An Act to consolidate the Solicitors Acts, 1839 to 1928, and other enactments relating to solicitors of the Supreme Court.
- Citation: 22 & 23 Geo. 5. c. 37
- Territorial extent: England and Wales (Note: Section 83(3).)

Dates
- Royal assent: 12 July 1932
- Commencement: 1 October 1932 (Note: Section 83(2).)
- Repealed: 15 July 1957
Other legislation
Amends	See § Repealed enactments
Repeals/revokes	See § Repealed enactments
Amended by	Administration of Justice Act 1932; Solicitors Act 1933; Solicitors Act 1934; Solicitors Act 1936; Solicitors (Disciplinary Committee) Act 1939; Solicitors Act 1941; Solicitors, Public Notaries, &c. Act 1949; Justices of the Peace Act 1949; Solicitors Act 1950; Solicitors (Amendment) Act 1956
Repealed by	Solicitors Act 1957
Relates to	Solicitors (Scotland) Act 1933

Status: Repealed

Text of statute as originally enacted

The Solicitors Act 1932 (22 & 23 Geo. 5. c. 37) was an act of the Parliament of the United Kingdom that consolidated enactments relating to solicitors of the Supreme Court of Judicature.

The Solicitors (Scotland) Act 1933 (23 & 24 Geo. 5. c. 21) made equivalent provisions for Scotland.

== Provisions ==
=== Repealed enactments ===
Section 82(1) of the act repealed 27 enactments, listed in the fourth schedule to the act.

Citation	Short title	Extent of repeal
2 & 3 Vict. c. 33	Solicitors (Clerks) Act 1839	Section nine.
6 & 7 Vict. c. 73	Solicitors Act 1843	The whole act.
7 & 8 Vict. c. 86	Solicitors (Clerks) Act 1844	Section four.
23 & 24 Vict. c. 127	Solicitors Act 1860	The whole act, except:— (i) in section twenty-two, the words "Any List of Solicitors and Conveyancers purporting to be published by the Authority of the Commissioners of Inland Revenue, and to contain the Names of Solicitors and Conveyancers who have obtained stamped Certificates for the current Year on or before the First Day of January in the same Year, shall, until the contrary be made to appear, be Evidence in all Courts, and before all Justices of the Peace and others, that the Persons named therein as Conveyancers holding such Certificates as aforesaid for the current Year are Conveyancers holding such Certificates; and the Absence of the Name of any Person from such List shall, until the contrary be made to appear, be Evidence as aforesaid that such Person is not qualified to practice as a Conveyancer under a Certificate for the current Year; but in the case of any Person being a Conveyancer whose Name does not appear on such List, the Fact of his being so shall be proved in the Way in which it is now by Law required to be proved"; and (ii) Sections twenty-seven, thirty-four and thirty-five.
33 & 34 Vict. c. 28	Attorneys and Solicitors Act 1870	In section three, the words from the words following to “proctors and from the word Client to the end of the section. Sections four to eighteen.
35 & 36 Vict. c. 81	Attorney and Solicitors Act 1872	The whole act.
37 & 38 Vict. c. 68	Attorneys and Solicitors Act 1874	The whole act.
38 & 39 Vict. c. 79	Legal Practitioners Act 1875	The whole act.
40 & 41 Vict. c. 25	Solicitors Act 1877	The whole act.
40 & 41 Vict. c. 62	Legal Practitioners Act 1877	The whole act.
44 & 45 Vict. c. 44	Solicitors Remuneration Act 1881	The whole act.
51 & 52 Vict. c. 65	Solicitors Act 1888	The whole act.
54 & 55 Vict. c. 39	Stamp Act 1891	Section forty-four.
57 Vict. c. 9	Solicitors Act 1894	The whole act.
58 & 59 Vict. c. 25	Mortgagees Legal Costs Act 1895	The whole act.
62 & 63 Vict. c. 4	Solicitors Act 1899	The whole act.
62 & 63 Vict. c. 14	London Government Act 1899	Subsection (3) of section twenty-four.
63 & 64 Vict. c. 14	Colonial Solicitors Act 1900	The whole act.
6 Edw. 7. c. 16	Justices of the Peace Act 1906	In section three, from the word "but" to the end of the section.
6 Edw. 7. c. 24	Solicitors Act 1906	The whole act.
9 & 10 Geo. 5. c. 56	Solicitors Act 1919	The whole act.
9 & 10 Geo. 5. c. 71	Sex Disqualification (Removal) Act 1919	Section two.
11 & 12 Geo. 5. c. 32	Finance Act 1921	Section sixty.
12 & 13 Geo. 5. c. 57	Solicitors Act 1922	The whole act.
15 & 16 Geo. 5. c. 21	Land Registration Act 1925	Sections one hundred and eighteen and one hundred and forty-six.
15 & 16 Geo. 5. c. 49	Supreme Court of Judicature (Consolidation) Act 1925	Subsections (2) and (3) of section two hundred and fifteen. In subsection (1) of section two hundred and sixteen, the words from "and (b)" to "appointment."
18 & 19 Geo. 5. c. 22	Solicitors Act 1928	The whole act.

== Subsequent developments ==
The whole act was repealed by section 88(1) of, and the third schedule to, the Solicitors Act 1957 (5 & 6 Eliz. 2. c. 27), which came into operation on 15 July 1957.
