= List of acts of the Parliament of the United Kingdom from 1933 =

This is a complete list of acts of the Parliament of the United Kingdom for the year 1933.

Note that the first parliament of the United Kingdom was held in 1801; parliaments between 1707 and 1800 were either parliaments of Great Britain or of Ireland). For acts passed up until 1707, see the list of acts of the Parliament of England and the list of acts of the Parliament of Scotland. For acts passed from 1707 to 1800, see the list of acts of the Parliament of Great Britain. See also the list of acts of the Parliament of Ireland.

For acts of the devolved parliaments and assemblies in the United Kingdom, see the list of acts of the Scottish Parliament, the list of acts of the Northern Ireland Assembly, and the list of acts and measures of Senedd Cymru; see also the list of acts of the Parliament of Northern Ireland.

The number shown after each act's title is its chapter number. Acts passed before 1963 are cited using this number, preceded by the year(s) of the reign during which the relevant parliamentary session was held; thus the Union with Ireland Act 1800 is cited as "39 & 40 Geo. 3 c. 67", meaning the 67th act passed during the session that started in the 39th year of the reign of George III and which finished in the 40th year of that reign. Note that the modern convention is to use Arabic numerals in citations (thus "41 Geo. 3" rather than "41 Geo. III"). Acts of the last session of the Parliament of Great Britain and the first session of the Parliament of the United Kingdom are both cited as "41 Geo. 3". Acts passed from 1963 onwards are simply cited by calendar year and chapter number.

== 23 & 24 Geo. 5 ==
Continuing the second session of the 36th Parliament of the United Kingdom, which met from 22 November 1932 until 17 November 1933.

This session was also traditionally cited as 23 & 24 G. 5.

=== Public general acts ===
Short title	Citation	Royal assent
Long title
Consolidated Fund (No. 2) Act 1933 (repealed)	23 & 24 Geo. 5. c. 3	29 March 1933
An Act to apply certain sums out of the Consolidated Fund to the service of the years ending on the thirty-first day of March, one thousand nine hundred and thirty-two, one thousand nine hundred and thirty-three and one thousand nine hundred and thirty-four. (Repealed by Statute Law Revision Act 1950 (14 Geo. 6. c. 6))
Evidence (Foreign, Dominion and Colonial Documents) Act 1933	23 & 24 Geo. 5. c. 4	29 March 1933
An Act to make further and better provision with respect to the admissibility in evidence in the United Kingdom of entries contained in the public registers of other countries and with respect to the proof by means of duly authenticated official certificates of entries in such registers and in consular registers and of other matters.
Austrian Loan Guarantee Act 1933 (repealed)	23 & 24 Geo. 5. c. 5	29 March 1933
An Act to authorise the Treasury to guarantee a portion of a loan to be raised by the Government of Austria. (Repealed by Statute Law Revision Act 1959 (7 & 8 Eliz. 2. c. 68))
Visiting Forces (British Commonwealth) Act 1933	23 & 24 Geo. 5. c. 6	29 March 1933
An Act to make provision with respect to forces of His Majesty from other parts of the British Commonwealth when visiting the United Kingdom or a colony; with respect to the exercise of command and discipline when forces of His Majesty from different parts of the Commonwealth are serving together; with respect to the attachment of members of one such force to another such force, and with respect to deserters from such forces.
Indian Pay (Temporary Abatements) Act 1933 (repealed)	23 & 24 Geo. 5. c. 7	29 March 1933
An Act to extend the period in respect of which abatements from pay may be made under the Indian Pay (Temporary Abatements) Act, 1931, (Note: Indian Pay (Temporary Abatements) Act 1931 (22 & 23 Geo. 5. c. 7)) subject to a reduction in the percentage to which such abatements are limited. (Repealed by Statute Law Revision Act 1950 (14 Geo. 6. c. 6))
Local Government (General Exchequer Contributions) Act 1933 (repealed)	23 & 24 Geo. 5. c. 8	29 March 1933
An Act to determine in respect of the years in the second fixed grant period such of the amounts to be included in the General Exchequer Contribution for England and the General Exchequer Contribution for Scotland, and in the payments to be made out of the Road Fund towards the said contributions respectively, as require to be determined periodically by Parliament. (Repealed by Local Government Act 1948 (11 & 12 Geo. 6. c. 26))
Assurance Companies (Winding up) Act 1933 (repealed)	23 & 24 Geo. 5. c. 9	29 March 1933
An Act to provide for the winding up of insolvent assurance companies, and for purposes connected with the matter aforesaid. (Repealed by Insurance Companies Act 1958 (6 & 7 Eliz. 2. c. 72))
Russian Goods (Import Prohibition) Act 1933 (repealed)	23 & 24 Geo. 5. c. 10	13 April 1933
An Act to authorise the prohibition of the importation of Russian goods. (Repealed by Statute Law (Repeals) Act 1971 (c. 52))
Army and Air Force (Annual) Act 1933 (repealed)	23 & 24 Geo. 5. c. 11	13 April 1933
An Act to provide, during Twelve Months, for the Discipline and Regulation of the Army and the Air Force. (Repealed by Statute Law Revision Act 1950 (14 Geo. 6. c. 6) and Revision of the Army and Air Force Acts (Transitional Provisions) Act 1955 (3 & 4 Eliz. 2. c. 20))
Children and Young Persons Act 1933	23 & 24 Geo. 5. c. 12	13 April 1933
An Act to consolidate certain enactments relating to persons under the age of eighteen years.
Foreign Judgments (Reciprocal Enforcement) Act 1933	23 & 24 Geo. 5. c. 13	13 April 1933
An Act to make provision for the enforcement in the United Kingdom of judgments given in foreign countries which accord reciprocal treatment to judgments given in the United Kingdom, for facilitating the enforcement in foreign countries of judgments given in the United Kingdom, and for other purposes in connection with the matters aforesaid.
London Passenger Transport Act 1933	23 & 24 Geo. 5. c. 14	13 April 1933
An Act to provide for the establishment of a Passenger Transport Board for an area to be known as the London Passenger Transport Area, which shall comprise certain portions of the London Traffic Area and of the districts adjacent thereto, and for the transfer to that Board of various transport undertakings and interests; to make other provisions with respect to traffic in the said area; and for purposes connected with the matters aforesaid.
Housing (Financial Provisions) Act 1933 (repealed)	23 & 24 Geo. 5. c. 15	18 May 1933
An Act to bring to an end the power of the Minister of Health to grant subsidies under sections one and three of the Housing, &c. Act, 1923, (Note: Housing, &c. Act, 1923 (13 & 14 Geo. 5. c. 24)) and the Housing (Financial Provisions) Act, 1924, (Note: Housing (Financial Provisions) Act 1924 (14 & 15 Geo. 5. c. 35)) and to enable him to undertake to make contributions in certain cases towards losses sustained by authorities under guarantees given by them for facilitating the provision of houses to be let to the working classes. (Repealed by Housing Act 1936 (26 Geo. 5 & 1 Edw. 8. c. 51) and Statute Law Revision Act 1950 (14 Geo. 6. c. 6))
Housing (Financial Provisions) (Scotland) Act 1933 (repealed)	23 & 24 Geo. 5. c. 16	18 May 1933
An Act to provide for the reduction of the subsidies payable to local authorities in Scotland under section two of the Housing (Financial Provisions) Act, 1924, in certain cases, and in all other respects to bring to an end the power of the Department of Health for Scotland to grant subsidies under sections one and three of the Housing, &c. Act, 1923, and the said Act of 1924; to enable the said Department to undertake to make contributions in certain cases towards losses sustained by local authorities under guarantees given by them for facilitating the provision of houses to be let to the working classes; and for purposes connected with or incidental to the foresaid matters. (Repealed by Housing (Financial Provisions) (Scotland) Act 1972 (c. 46))
Protection of Animals (Cruelty to Dogs) Act 1933 (repealed)	23 & 24 Geo. 5. c. 17	18 May 1933
An Act to enable courts to disqualify for keeping dogs persons convicted of cruelty to them. (Repealed by Protection of Animals (Amendment) Act 1988 (c. 29))
Exchange Equalisation Account Act 1933 (repealed)	23 & 24 Geo. 5. c. 18	18 May 1933
An Act to increase to three hundred and fifty million pounds the aggregate amount which may be issued to the Exchange Equalisation Account out of the Consolidated Fund. (Repealed by Statute Law Revision Act 1950 (14 Geo. 6. c. 6))
Finance Act 1933	23 & 24 Geo. 5. c. 19	28 June 1933
An Act to grant certain duties of Customs and Inland Revenue (including Excise), to alter other duties, and to amend the law relating to Customs and Inland Revenue (including Excise) and the National Debt, and to make further provision in connection with finance.
False Oaths (Scotland) Act 1933 (repealed)	23 & 24 Geo. 5. c. 20	28 June 1933
An Act to consolidate and simplify the law of Scotland relating to false oaths, declarations, and statements. (Repealed by Criminal Justice and Licensing (Scotland) Act 2010 (asp 13))
Solicitors (Scotland) Act 1933 (repealed)	23 & 24 Geo. 5. c. 21	28 June 1933
An Act to consolidate and amend the law relating to Solicitors and Notaries Public in Scotland. (Repealed by Solicitors (Scotland) Act 1980 (c. 46))
Teachers (Superannuation) Act 1933 (repealed)	23 & 24 Geo. 5. c. 22	28 June 1933
An Act to amend section eleven of the Teachers (Superannuation) Act, 1925, (Note: Teachers (Superannuation) Act 1925 (15 & 16 Geo. 5. c. 59)) and paragraph (d) of subsection (1) of section four of the Education (Scotland) (Superannuation) Act, 1925. (Note: Education (Scotland) (Superannuation) Act 1925 (15 & 16 Geo. 5. c. 55)) (Repealed by Teachers (Superannuation) Act 1937 (1 Edw. 8 & 1 Geo. 6. c. 47), Education (Scotland) Act 1946 (9 & 10 Geo. 6. c. 72) and Statute Law Revision Act 1950 (14 Geo. 6. c. 6))
Government of India (Amendment) Act 1933 (repealed)	23 & 24 Geo. 5. c. 23	28 June 1933
An Act to amend the provisions of the Government of India Act (Note: Government of India Act 1915 (5 & 6 Geo. 5. c. 61)) relating to the extension of the duration of a Governor's Legislative Council. (Repealed by Government of India Act 1935 (26 Geo. 5 & 1 Edw. 8. c. 2))
Solicitors Act 1933 (repealed)	23 & 24 Geo. 5. c. 24	28 June 1933
An Act to amend the law relating to solicitors by providing for the making and enforcement of rules as to the keeping of accounts for clients' moneys and other matters of professional conduct. (Repealed by Solicitors Act 1957 (5 & 6 Eliz. 2. c. 27))
Pharmacy and Poisons Act 1933 (repealed)	23 & 24 Geo. 5. c. 25	28 June 1933
An Act to amend the law relating to Pharmacy and Poisons and for purposes consequential on such amendment. (Repealed by Statute Law Revision Act 1950 (14 Geo. 6. c. 6), Pharmacy Act 1954 (2 & 3 Eliz. 2. c. 61), Medicines Act 1968 (c. 67) and Poisons Act 1972 (c. 66))
Unemployment Insurance (Expiring Enactments) Act 1933 (repealed)	23 & 24 Geo. 5. c. 26	28 June 1933
An Act to continue in force for a further period the Unemployment Insurance Act, 1930, (Note: Unemployment Insurance Act 1930 (20 & 21 Geo. 5. c. 16)) and sections one and two of the Unemployment Insurance (No. 3) Act, 1931. (Note: Unemployment Insurance (No. 3) Act 1931 (21 & 22 Geo. 5. c. 36)) (Repealed by Unemployment Act 1934 (24 & 25 Geo. 5. c. 29))
Blind Voters Act 1933 (repealed)	23 & 24 Geo. 5. c. 27	18 July 1933
An Act to amend the Ballot Act, 1872, (Note: Ballot Act 1872 (35 & 36 Vict. c. 33)) so as to enable any blind voter at a poll regulated by that Act to avail himself of the assistance of a relative or friend, and for purposes connected with the matter aforesaid. (Repealed by Representation of the People Act 1949 (12, 13 & 14 Geo. 6. c. 68))
Municipal Corporations (Audit) Act 1933 (repealed)	23 & 24 Geo. 5. c. 28	18 July 1933
An Act to enable Municipal Corporations to provide for the audit of their accounts and of the accounts of their officers by district auditors or by other qualified accountants. (Repealed by Local Government Act 1933 (23 & 24 Geo. 5. c. 51))
Education (Necessity of Schools) Act 1933 (repealed)	23 & 24 Geo. 5. c. 29	18 July 1933
An Act to amend subsection (1) of section nineteen of the Education Act, 1921, (Note: Education Act 1921 (11 & 12 Geo. 5. c. 51)) and for purposes consequential on such amendment. (Repealed by Education Act 1944 (7 & 8 Geo. 6. c. 31))
Cotton Industry Act 1933 (repealed)	23 & 24 Geo. 5. c. 30	18 July 1933
An Act to amend and prolong the duration of the Cotton Industry Act, 1923. (Note: Cotton Industry Act 1923 (13 & 14 Geo. 5. c. 22)) (Repealed by Statute Law Revision Act 1950 (14 Geo. 6. c. 6))
Agricultural Marketing Act 1933 (repealed)	23 & 24 Geo. 5. c. 31	18 July 1933
An Act to provide for the better organisation and development of the agricultural industry and of industries connected therewith by regulating the importation and sale of agricultural products and the production of secondary agricultural products; to amend the law with respect to the marketing of agricultural products; and to make further provision in connection with the matters aforesaid. (Repealed by Agricultural Marketing Act 1958 (6 & 7 Eliz. 2. c. 47) and Weights and Measures Act 1963 (c. 31))
Rent and Mortgage Interest Restrictions (Amendment) Act 1933 (repealed)	23 & 24 Geo. 5. c. 32	18 July 1933
An Act to amend and continue the Rent and Mortgage Interest (Restrictions) Acts, 1920 to 1925. (Repealed for England and Wales by Rent Act 1968 (c. 23) and for Scotland by Rent (Scotland) Act 1971 (c. 28))
Metropolitan Police Act 1933 (repealed)	23 & 24 Geo. 5. c. 33	18 July 1933
An Act to amend the enactments relating to the metropolitan police force in regard to the number of assistant commissioners of police, the age of compulsory retirement, membership of the Police Federation and the appointment of constables for a fixed period of service; to adapt to the case of constables so appointed the enactments relating to police pensions and gratuities, National Health Insurance, and Widows', Orphans' and Old Age Contributory Pensions; and for purposes connected with the matters aforesaid. (Repealed by Drug Trafficking Offences Act 1986 (c. 32))
Appropriation Act 1933 (repealed)	23 & 24 Geo. 5. c. 34	28 July 1933
An Act to apply a sum out of the Consolidated Fund to the service of the year ending on the thirty-first day of March, one thousand nine hundred and thirty-four, and to appropriate the Supplies granted in this Session of Parliament. (Repealed by Statute Law Revision Act 1950 (14 Geo. 6. c. 6))
Trout (Scotland) Act 1933	23 & 24 Geo. 5. c. 35	28 July 1933
An Act to provide for the better protection of trout in Scotland, and for other purposes relating thereto.
Administration of Justice (Miscellaneous Provisions) Act 1933	23 & 24 Geo. 5. c. 36	28 July 1933
An Act to abolish grand juries and amend the law as to the presentment of indictments; to provide for the summary determination of questions as to liability for death duties; to make provision for alternative procedure for the recovery of Crown debts and to enable proceedings by the Crown to be instituted in county courts in appropriate cases; to amend the procedure as to certain prerogative writs and as to trials by jury in the High Court; to amend the law as to the payment of costs by and to the Crown; to provide for the further delegation of the jurisdiction of the Master in Lunacy; and for purposes connected with the matters aforesaid.
Private Legislation Procedure (Scotland) Act 1933 (repealed)	23 & 24 Geo. 5. c. 37	28 July 1933
An Act to improve and extend the procedure under the Private Legislation Procedure (Scotland) Act, 1899. (Note: Private Legislation Procedure (Scotland) Act 1899 (62 & 63 Vict. c. 47)) (Repealed by Private Legislation Procedure (Scotland) Act 1936 (26 Geo. 5 & 1 Edw. 8. c. 52))
Summary Jurisdiction (Appeals) Act 1933 (repealed)	23 & 24 Geo. 5. c. 38	28 July 1933
An Act to amend the law relating to appeals from courts of summary jurisdiction. (Repealed by Courts Act 1971 (c. 23))
Slaughter of Animals Act 1933 (repealed)	23 & 24 Geo. 5. c. 39	28 July 1933
An Act to provide for the humane and scientific slaughter of animals; and for purposes connected therewith. (Repealed by Slaughter of Animals Act 1958 (7 & 8 Eliz. 2. c. 8))
Isle of Man (Customs) Act 1933 (repealed)	23 & 24 Geo. 5. c. 40	28 July 1933
An Act to amend the law with respect to Customs, in the Isle of Man. (Repealed for the Isle of Man by Customs and Excise etc. Order 1976 (GC No 1/76))
Administration of Justice (Scotland) Act 1933	23 & 24 Geo. 5. c. 41	28 July 1933
An Act to amend the law of Scotland relating to the Court of Session and procedure therein, to the appointment of Officers in the said Court and the High Court of Justiciary, to criminal jury trials and to the Sheriffs and procedure in the Sheriff Court, and with regard to solicitors' fees; and for purposes connected therewith.
Service of Process (Justices) Act 1933 (repealed)	23 & 24 Geo. 5. c. 42	28 July 1933
An Act to make provision for the service by post of summonses issued by justices of the peace in England, to amend the law with respect to the mode of proving the service of process and other documents in proceedings before, and on appeal from, such justices, and for purposes connected with the matters aforesaid. (Repealed by Magistrates' Courts Act 1952 (15 & 16 Geo. 6 & 1 Eliz. 2. c. 55))
Local Government and other Officers Superannuation (Temporary Provisions) Act 1933 (repealed)	23 & 24 Geo. 5. c. 43	28 July 1933
An Act to make provision for certain deductions from remuneration to be disregarded in the computation of contributions, pensions and gratuities under enactments relating to the superannuation of persons employed, or paid, by local authorities and other public bodies; to give retrospective effect to such provision; and for purposes connected with the matters aforesaid. (Repealed by Statute Law (Repeals) Act 1989 (c. 43))
Church of Scotland (Property and Endowments) (Amendment) Act 1933	23 & 24 Geo. 5. c. 44	28 July 1933
An Act to amend the Church of Scotland (Property and Endowments) Act, 1925, (Note: Church of Scotland (Property and Endowments) Act 1925 (15 & 16 Geo. 5. c. 33)) to make further provision with regard to the properties and endowments of the Church of Scotland, and for purposes connected therewith.
Sea-Fishing Industry Act 1933 (repealed)	23 & 24 Geo. 5. c. 45	28 July 1933
An Act to provide for regulating the catching, landing, and sale of sea-fish, for the constitution of a Sea-fish Commission, and for purposes connected with the matters aforesaid. (Repealed by Sea Fisheries (Shellfish) Act 1967 (c. 83) and Sea Fish (Conservation) Act 1967 (c. 84))
Electricity (Supply) Act 1933 (repealed)	23 & 24 Geo. 5. c. 46	28 July 1933
An Act to amend section sixteen of the Electricity (Supply) Act, 1919, (Note: Electricity (Supply) Act 1919 (9 & 10 Geo. 5. c. 100)) and section twenty-one of the Electricity (Supply) Act, 1922. (Note: Electricity (Supply) Act 1922 (12 & 13 Geo. 5. c. 46)) (Repealed by Electricity Act 1947 (10 & 11 Geo. 6. c. 54))
Superannuation (Ecclesiastical Commissioners and Queen Anne's Bounty) Act 1933 (repealed)	23 & 24 Geo. 5. c. 47	17 November 1933
An Act to amend the Superannuation (Ecclesiastical Commissioners and Queen Anne's Bounty) Act, 1914. (Note: Superannuation (Ecclesiastical Commissioners and Queen Anne's Bounty) Act 1914 (4 & 5 Geo. 5. c. 5)) (Repealed by Statute Law (Repeals) Act 1971 (c. 52))
Expiring Laws Continuance Act 1933 (repealed)	23 & 24 Geo. 5. c. 48	17 November 1933
An Act to continue certain expiring laws. (Repealed by Dyestuffs (Import Regulation) Act 1934 (24 & 25 Geo. 5. c. 6) and Statute Law Revision Act 1950 (14 Geo. 6. c. 6))
British Nationality and Status of Aliens Act 1933 (repealed)	23 & 24 Geo. 5. c. 49	17 November 1933
An Act to amend the law relating to the national status of married women so far as is necessary for giving effect to a Convention on certain questions relating to the Conflict of Nationality Laws, signed on behalf of His Majesty at the Hague on the twelfth day of April, nineteen hundred and thirty, and for purposes incidental to the matter aforesaid. (Repealed by British Nationality Act 1948 (11 & 12 Geo. 6. c. 56))
Firearms and Imitation Firearms (Criminal Use) Act 1933 (repealed)	23 & 24 Geo. 5. c. 50	17 November 1933
An Act to impose penalties for the use, attempted use and possession of firearms and imitation firearms in certain cases, to amend certain provisions of the Larceny Act, 1916, (Note: Larceny Act 1916 (6 & 7 Geo. 5. c. 50)) relating to offensive weapons or instruments, and for purposes connected with the matters aforesaid. (Repealed by Firearms Act 1937 (1 Edw. 8 & 1 Geo. 6. c. 12))
Local Government Act 1933 (repealed)	23 & 24 Geo. 5. c. 51	17 November 1933
An Act to consolidate with amendments the enactments relating to authorities for the purposes of local government in England and Wales exclusive (except in relation to certain matters) of London. (Repealed by Local Government Act 1972 (c. 70) and Local Authorities (England) (Property etc.) Order 1973 (SI 1973/1861))
Protection of Birds Act 1933 (repealed)	23 & 24 Geo. 5. c. 52	17 November 1933
An Act to provide for the protection of birds of species resident in or visiting Great Britain in a wild state. (Repealed by Protection of Birds Act 1954 (2 & 3 Eliz. 2. c. 30))
Road and Rail Traffic Act 1933	23 & 24 Geo. 5. c. 53	17 November 1933
An Act to make provision for regulating the carriage of goods on roads by motor vehicles and for controlling the use of vehicles on certain roads; to amend certain provisions of the Road Traffic Act 1930; (Note: Road Traffic Act 1930 (20 & 21 Geo. 5. c. 43)) to amend the law relating to railways and to make provision for constituting a council to advise on questions in connection with the means of, and facilities for, transport; and for purposes connected with the matters aforesaid.

=== Local acts ===
Short title	Citation	Royal assent
Long title
Public Works Facilities Scheme (Torquay Corporation) Confirmation Act 1933	23 & 24 Geo. 5. c. ii	29 March 1933
An Act to confirm a Scheme made by the Minister of Health under the Public Works Facilities Act 1930 (Note: Public Works Facilities Act 1930 (20 & 21 Geo. 5. c. 50)) relating to the Torquay Corporation.
	Torquay Corporation (Water) Scheme 1933 Scheme under the Public Works Facilities Act 1930 empowering the mayor aldermen and burgesses of the borough of Torquay to construct waterworks and for other purposes.	
Ministry of Health Provisional Order Confirmation (Buckingham and Oxford) Act 1933	23 & 24 Geo. 5. c. iii	29 March 1933
An Act to confirm a Provisional Order of the Minister of Health relating to the counties of Buckingham and Oxford.
	Buckinghamshire and Oxfordshire Order 1932 (Note: Although passed in 1933, the short title is specified as the Buckinghamshire and Oxfordshire Order 1932.) Provisional Order made in pursuance of the Local Government Act 1888 (Note: Local Government Act 1888 (51 & 52 Vict. c. 41)) altering county boundaries.	
Ministry of Health Provisional Order Confirmation (Leek) Act 1933	23 & 24 Geo. 5. c. iv	29 March 1933
An Act to confirm a Provisional Order of the Minister of Health relating to the urban district of Leek.
	Leek Order 1932 (Note: Although passed in 1933, the short title is specified as the Leek Order 1932.) Provisional Order altering a local Act. (Note: Leek Urban District Council Water Act 1925 (15 & 16 Geo. 5. c. civ)))	
Ministry of Health Provisional Order Confirmation (Rugby Joint Hospital District) Act 1933 (repealed)	23 & 24 Geo. 5. c. v	29 March 1933
An Act to confirm a Provisional Order of the Minister of Health relating to the Rugby Joint Hospital District. (Repealed by Statute Law (Repeals) Act 1995 (c. 44))
	Rugby Joint Hospital District Order 1932 (Note: Although passed in 1933, the short title is specified as the Rugby Joint Hospital District Order 1932.) Provisional Order forming a united district under section 279 of the Public Health Act 1875. (Note: Public Health Act 1875 (38 & 39 Vict. c. 55))	
Ministry of Health Provisional Order Confirmation (Taunton and District Joint Hospital District) Act 1933	23 & 24 Geo. 5. c. vi	29 March 1933
An Act to confirm a Provisional Order of the Minister of Health relating to the Taunton and District Joint Hospital District.
	Taunton and District Joint Hospital Order 1932 (Note: Although passed in 1933, the short title is specified as the Taunton and District Joint Hospital Order 1932.) Provisional Order forming a united district under section 279 of the Public Health Act 1875.	
Ministry of Health Provisional Order Confirmation (Chester and Lancaster) Act 1933	23 & 24 Geo. 5. c. vii	29 March 1933
An Act to confirm a Provisional Order of the Minister of Health relating to counties of Chester and Lancaster.
	Chester and Lancaster Order 1932 (Note: Although passed in 1933, the short title is specified as the Chester and Lancaster Order 1932.) Provisional Order made in pursuance of the Local Government Act 1888 altering county boundaries.	
Ministry of Health Provisional Order Confirmation (Eton Joint Hospital District) Act 1933	23 & 24 Geo. 5. c. viii	29 March 1933
An Act to confirm a Provisional Order of the Minister of Health relating to the Eton Joint Hospital District.
	Eton Joint Hospital Order 1932 (Note: Although passed in 1933, the short title is specified as the Eton Joint Hospital Order 1932.) Provisional Order forming a united district under section 279 of the Public Health Act 1875.	
Preston Corporation Act 1933 (repealed)	23 & 24 Geo. 5. c. ix	29 March 1933
An Act to confer further powers upon the corporation of Preston with reference to their water undertaking and the finance of the borough and for other purposes. (Repealed by County of Lancaster Act 1984 (c. xxi))
Doncaster Area Drainage Act 1933	23 & 24 Geo. 5. c. x	13 April 1933
An Act to make provision for the better drainage of the Doncaster Drainage District, to provide for the dissolution of the Doncaster Drainage District Board and the transfer of certain property, rights, functions and liabilities of that Board to certain Catchment Boards, and for objects connected with the purposes aforesaid.
Ministry of Health Provisional Order Confirmation (Torquay) Act 1933	23 & 24 Geo. 5. c. xi	18 May 1933
An Act to confirm a Provisional Order of the Minister of Health relating to the borough of Torquay.
	Torquay Order 1933 Provisional Order amending certain local Acts and Provisional Orders.	
London and North Eastern Railway Act 1933	23 & 24 Geo. 5. c. xii	18 May 1933
An Act to empower the London and North Eastern Railway Company to acquire additional lands to extend the time for the compulsory purchase of certain lands and for other purposes.
Durham Corporation Act 1933 (repealed)	23 & 24 Geo. 5. c. xiii	18 May 1933
An Act to make further and better provision for the improvement health local government and finance of the city of Durham and Framwelgate and for other purposes. (Repealed by Durham City Council Act 1985 (c. xxix))
Jesus Hospital (Chipping Barnet) Scheme Charity Confirmation Act 1933 (repealed)	23 & 24 Geo. 5. c. xiv	28 June 1933
An Act to confirm a Scheme of the Charity Commissioners for the application or management of the Charity called Jesus Hospital in Chipping Barnet in the County of Hereford. (Repealed by Statute Law (Repeals) Act 2013 (c. 2))
	Scheme for the Application or Management of the Charity called Jesus Hospital in Chipping Barnet in the County of Hereford regulated by a scheme of the Charity Commissioners of the 15th May 1925 as varied by a scheme of the said Commissioners of the 27th May 1932.	
Victoria Infirmary of Glasgow Act 1888 (Amendment) Order Confirmation Act 1933	23 & 24 Geo. 5. c. xv	28 June 1933
An Act to confirm a Provisional Order under the Private Legislation Procedure (Scotland) Act 1899 (Note: Private Legislation Procedure (Scotland) Act 1899 (62 & 63 Vict. c. 47)) relating to the Victoria Infirmary of Glasgow.
	Victoria Infirmary of Glasgow Act 1888 (Amendment) Order 1933 Provisional Order to confer further powers on the Governors of the Victoria Infirmary of Glasgow to amend the provisions of the Victoria Infirmary of Glasgow Act 1888 (Note: Victoria Infirmary of Glasgow Act 1888 (51 & 52 Vict. c. xxxvi)) and for other purposes.	
Aberdeen Royal Infirmary and Mental Hospital Order Confirmation Act 1933	23 & 24 Geo. 5. c. xvi	28 June 1933
An Act to confirm a Provisional Order under the Private Legislation Procedure (Scotland) Act 1899 relating to the Aberdeen Royal Infirmary and Mental Hospital.
	Aberdeen Royal Infirmary and Mental Hospital Order 1933 Provisional Order to change the name of the Corporation of the Royal Infirmary and Lunatic Asylum of Aberdeen and of the Asylum; to confer further powers on the said Corporation and for other purposes.	
Ministry of Health Provisional Orders Confirmation (Hereford and West Kent Main Sewerage District) Act 1933	23 & 24 Geo. 5. c. xvii	28 June 1933
An Act to confirm certain Provisional Orders of the Minister of Health relating to the City of Hereford and the West Kent Main Sewerage District.
	Hereford Order 1933 Provisional Order altering the Hereford Improvement Act 1854. (Note: Hereford Improvement Act 1854 (17 & 18 Vict. c. xxxi))	
	West Kent Main Sewerage Order 1933 Provisional Order for altering certain local Acts and Confirming Acts.	
Ministry of Health Provisional Orders Confirmation (Tees Valley and West Monmouthshire Omnibus Board) Act 1933	23 & 24 Geo. 5. c. xviii	28 June 1933
An Act to confirm certain Provisional Orders of the Minister of Health relating to the Tees Valley Water Board and the West Monmouthshire Omnibus Board.
	Tees Valley Water Order 1933 Provisional Order altering a local Act. (Note: Tees Valley Water Act 1930 (20 & 21 Geo. 5. c. lxix))	
	West Monmouthshire Omnibus Order 1933 Provisional Order altering a local Act. (Note: Mynyddislwyn Urban District Council Act 1926 (16 & 17 Geo. 5. c. lxxv))	
Ministry of Health Provisional Order Confirmation (Sheffield) Act 1933 (repealed)	23 & 24 Geo. 5. c. xix	28 June 1933
An Act to confirm a Provisional Order of the Minister of Health relating to the City of Sheffield. (Repealed by Statute Law (Repeals) Act 1989 (c. 43))
	Sheffield (Water) Order 1933 Provisional Order amending certain Local Acts and Provisional Orders.	
Great Western Railway Act 1933	23 & 24 Geo. 5. c. xx	28 June 1933
An Act for conferring further powers upon the Great Western Railway Company and for other purposes.
Oxford Corporation Act 1933	23 & 24 Geo. 5. c. xxi	28 June 1933
An Act to confer further powers upon the mayor aldermen and citizens of Oxford with regard to their electricity undertaking to make further and better provision for the improvement health and local government of the city of Oxford and for other purposes.
Staffordshire and Worcestershire Canal Act 1933	23 & 24 Geo. 5. c. xxii	28 June 1933
An Act to confer further powers on and to change the name of the Company of Proprietors of the Staffordshire and Worcestershire Canal Navigation and for other purposes.
City of London (Various Powers) Act 1933	23 & 24 Geo. 5. c. xxiii	28 June 1933
An Act to confer further powers upon the Corporation of London in regard to certain open spaces to make further provision with respect to the Metropolitan Cattle Market and sanitary matters and for other purposes.
Lyme Regis District Water Act 1933	23 & 24 Geo. 5. c. xxiv	28 June 1933
An Act to incorporate and confer powers upon the Lyme Regis District Water Company to authorise them to construct waterworks and to supply water in Lyme Regis and the neighbourhood thereof and for other purposes.
Amersham, Beaconsfield and District Waterworks Act 1933	23 & 24 Geo. 5. c. xxv	28 June 1933
An Act to incorporate and confer powers on the Amersham Beaconsfield and District Water Company and for other purposes.
Dewsbury and Ossett Passenger Transport Act 1933 (repealed)	23 & 24 Geo. 5. c. xxvi	28 June 1933
An Act to make provision for the abandonment of the tramways in the boroughs of Dewsbury and Ossett worked by the National Electric Construction Company Limited to provide for the running of public service vehicles in substitution therefor and for other purposes. (Repealed by Yorkshire Woollen District Transport Act 1980 (c. xxv))
Norwich Corporation Act 1933 (repealed)	23 & 24 Geo. 5. c. xxvii	28 June 1933
An Act to alter the style and title of the corporation of the city of Norwich to make further provision with regard to the water and electricity undertakings of the lord mayor aldermen and citizens of the city and the health local government and improvement thereof and for other purposes. (Repealed by Norwich City Council Act 1984 (c. xxiii))
London County Council (General Powers) Act 1933	23 & 24 Geo. 5. c. xxviii	28 June 1933
An Act to confer further powers upon the London County Council and other authorities and for other purposes.
Provisional Orders (Marriages) Confirmation Act 1933 (repealed)	23 & 24 Geo. 5. c. xxix	18 July 1933
An Act to confirm certain Provisional Orders made by one of His Majesty's Principal Secretaries of State under the Marriages Validity (Provisional Orders) Acts 1905 (Note: Provisional Order (Marriages) Act 1905 (5 Edw. 7. c. 23)) and 1924. (Note: Marriages Validity (Provisional Orders) Act 1924 (14 & 15 Geo. 5. c. 20)) (Repealed by Statute Law (Repeals) Act 1977 (c. 18))
	Old Church of Saint Andrew Neasden Order	
	Old Church of Saint Paul Chingford Order	
	Roman Catholic Chapel of the Immaculate Conception and Saint Joseph Waltham Cross Order	
	Saint Christopher Norris Green Liverpool Order	
Leeds Corporation Tramways Order Confirmation Act 1933 (repealed)	23 & 24 Geo. 5. c. xxx	18 July 1933
An Act to confirm a Provisional Order made by the Minister of Transport under the Tramways Act 1870 (Note: Tramways Act 1870 (33 & 34 Vict. c. 78)) relating to Leeds Corporation Tramways. (Repealed by West Yorkshire Act 1980 (c. xiv))
	Leeds Corporation Tramways Order 1933 Order authorising the lord mayor aldermen and citizens of the city of Leeds to construct additional tramways in their city.	
Nottinghamshire and Derbyshire Traction Company (Trolley Vehicles) Order Confirmation Act 1933 (repealed)	23 & 24 Geo. 5. c. xxxi	18 July 1933
An Act to confirm a Provisional Order made by the Minister of Transport under the Tramways Act 1870 relating to the Nottinghamshire and Derbyshire Traction Company Trolley Vehicles. (Repealed by Statute Law (Repeals) Act 1995 (c. 44))
	Nottinghamshire and Derbyshire Traction Company (Trolley Vehicles) Order 1933 Order authorising the Nottinghamshire and Derbyshire Traction Company to use trolley vehicles upon certain routes in the counties of Nottingham and Derby.	
Ministry of Health Provisional Orders Confirmation (Bath and Bury and District Joint Water Board) Act 1933	23 & 24 Geo. 5. c. xxxii	18 July 1933
An Act to confirm certain provisional orders of the Minister of Health relating to the city of Bath and the district of the Bury and District Joint Water Board.
	Bath Order 1933 Provisional Order repealing in part a Local Act. (Note: Bath Corporation Act 1925 (15 & 16 Geo. 5. c. xciii))	
	Bury and District Joint Water Order 1933 Provisional Order for altering and amending the Bury and District Joint Water Board Act 1903. (Note: Bury and District Joint Water Board Act 1903 (3 Edw. 7. c. ccxxxiv))	
London, Midland and Scottish Railway Act 1933	23 & 24 Geo. 5. c. xxxiii	18 July 1933
An Act to empower the London Midland and Scottish Railway Company to acquire lands and for other purposes.
Frimley and Farnborough District Water Act 1933	23 & 24 Geo. 5. c. xxxiv	18 July 1933
An Act to provide for the transfer to the Frimley and Farnborough District Water Company of the undertaking of the Wokingham District Water Company Limited to confer further powers upon the Frimley and Farnborough District Water Company and for other purposes.
Colne Corporation Act 1933	23 & 24 Geo. 5. c. xxxv	18 July 1933
An Act to amend the provisions of the Colne and Marsden Local Board Act 1881 (Note: Colne and Marsden Local Board Act 1881 (44 & 45 Vict. c. lxxxiii)) with respect to compensation water to confer further powers upon the corporation of Colne with respect to their water gas and electricity undertakings to enact further provisions with respect to the transport services in the borough and elsewhere to make better provision for the health local government and finance of the borough and for other purposes.
Cancer Hospital (Free) Act 1933 (repealed)	23 & 24 Geo. 5. c. xxxvi	18 July 1933
An Act to enable the Cancer Hospital (Free) to make and accept charges for the accommodation and treatment of certain patients and for other purposes. (Repealed by Statute Law (Repeals) Act 2013 (c. 2))
Calvinistic Methodist or Presbyterian Church of Wales Act 1933	23 & 24 Geo. 5. c. xxxvii	18 July 1933
An Act to amend the constitution of the Calvinistic Methodist Church of Wales or Presbyterian Church of Wales and to enlarge the powers of the Church and the objects of the trusts upon which property is held for the benefit of the Church to constitute and incorporate a body of trustees for the Church to vest in that body as custodian trustee certain trust properties held for the benefit of the Church and to authorise the future grant or transfer of property to that body as custodian trustee to provide for the management and administration of the said properties by managing trustees to regulate the proceedings of the said body and the said managing trustees and for other purposes.
Torquay and Paignton Tramways (Abandonment) Act 1933	23 & 24 Geo. 5. c. xxxviii	18 July 1933
An Act to authorise the Torquay Tramways Company Limited to abandon their existing tramways and for other purposes.
Mersey Tunnel Act 1933	23 & 24 Geo. 5. c. xxxix	18 July 1933
An Act to confer further borrowing powers for the completion of the tunnel authorised by the Mersey Tunnel Acts 1925 to 1928 to increase the aggregate amount of the tolls which may be collected in respect of the use of the tunnel and to extend the period of collection and for other purposes.
Sidmouth Urban District Council Act 1933	23 & 24 Geo. 5. c. xl	18 July 1933
An Act to transfer to and vest in the Sidmouth Urban District Council the undertaking of the Sidmouth Water Company and to authorise that council to supply water and to construct further waterworks to confer further powers upon them in regard to their gas undertaking to make further and better provision with regard to the health local government and finance of the district and for other purposes.
Rugby Corporation Act 1933 (repealed)	23 & 24 Geo. 5. c. xli	18 July 1933
An Act to confer further powers on the Rugby Corporation in relation to their water and elecсtricity undertakings lands and other matters to make further and better provision for the improvement health and local government of the borough to make provision with regard to the audit of the accounts of the Corporation and their officers and for other purposes. (Repealed by Statute Law (Repeals) Act 1995 (c. 44))
Worksop Corporation Act 1933 (repealed)	23 & 24 Geo. 5. c. xlii	18 July 1933
An Act to confer further powers upon the mayor aldermen and burgesses of the borough of Worksop with regard to their electricity and water undertakings to make further and better provision for the improvement health local government and finance of the borough and for other purposes. (Repealed by Nottinghamshire County Council Act 1985 (c. xv))
Commercial Gas Act 1933 (repealed)	23 & 24 Geo. 5. c. xliii	18 July 1933
An Act to prohibit the making by housing authorities of conditions as to the form of light heat power or energy to be supplied or used in certain cases in the limits of supply of the Commercial Gas Company and for other purposes. (Repealed by Gas Act 1948 (11 & 12 Geo. 6. c. 67))
London Overground Wires, &c. Act 1933	23 & 24 Geo. 5. c. xliv	18 July 1933
An Act to repeal the London Overhead Wires Act 1891 (Note: London Overhead Wires Act 1891 (54 & 55 Vict. c. lxxvii)) and to make other provision for the control and regulation of overground wires and other apparatus in the administrative county of London.
Essex County Council Act 1933	23 & 24 Geo. 5. c. xlv	18 July 1933
An Act to provide for the protection and improvement of certain streams in the county of Essex to confer further powers on the Essex County Council and local authorities in relation to the health and local government and the preservation of the amenities of the county to enact provisions with respect to massage establishments employment agencies hairdressers' and barbers' premises places of public entertainment sale of coke town planning and roads to make provision for the finance of the county and for other purposes.
Dearne District Traction Act 1933 (repealed)	23 & 24 Geo. 5. c. xlvi	18 July 1933
An Act to provide for the abandonment of the railways constructed under the powers of the Dearne District Light Railways Orders 1915 to 1924 and the running by the Yorkshire Traction Company Limited of services of stage carriages in substitution thereof and for other purposes. (Repealed by Statute Law (Repeals) Act 1989 (c. 43))
Southern Railway Act 1933	23 & 24 Geo. 5. c. xlvii	18 July 1933
An Act to empower the Southern Railway Company to construct works and acquire lands to extend the time for the compulsory purchase of certain lands to empower the said company and the London Midland and Scottish Railway Company to construct certain works and for other purposes.
London County Council (Money) Act 1933 (repealed)	23 & 24 Geo. 5. c. xlviii	18 July 1933
An Act to regulate the expenditure on capital account and lending of money by the London County Council during the financial period from the first day of April one thousand nine hundred and thirty-three to the thirtieth day of September one thousand nine hundred and thirty-four and for other purposes. (Repealed by London County Council (Loans) Act 1955 (4 & 5 Eliz. 2. c. xxvi))
Dundee Harbour and Tay Ferries Order Confirmation Act 1933 (repealed)	23 & 24 Geo. 5. c. xlix	28 July 1933
An Act to confirm a Provisional Order under the Private Legislation Procedure (Scotland) Act 1899 relating to Dundee Harbour and Tay Ferries. (Repealed by Dundee Harbour and Tay Ferries Order Confirmation Act 1952 (15 & 16 Geo. 6 & 1 Eliz. 2. c. xx))
	Dundee Harbour and Tay Ferries Order 1933 Provisional Order to. authorise the Trustees of the harbour of Dundee to construct works to amend the provisions of the Dundee Harbour and Tay Ferries Acts 1911 to 1925 relating to tolls dues rates duties and charges to authorise the Trustees to borrow additional money and to create stock to confer further powers on the Trustees and for other purposes.	
Aberdeen Harbour (Rates) Order Confirmation Act 1933 (repealed)	23 & 24 Geo. 5. c. l	28 July 1933
An Act to confirm a Provisional Order under the Private Legislation Procedure (Scotland) Act 1899 relating to Aberdeen Harbour (Rates). (Repealed by Aberdeen Harbour Order Confirmation Act 1960 (9 & 10 Eliz. 2. c. i))
	Aberdeen Harbour (Rates) Order 1933 Provisional Order to amend the provisions of the Aberdeen Harbour Acts 1895 to 1932 relating to rates and for other purposes.	
Leith Harbour and Docks Order Confirmation Act 1933 (repealed)	23 & 24 Geo. 5. c. li	28 July 1933
An Act to confirm a Provisional Order under the Private Legislation Procedure (Scotland) Act 1899 relating to Leith Harbour and Docks. (Repealed by Statute Law (Repeals) Act 1986 (c. 12))
	Leith Harbour and Docks Order 1933 Provisional Order to authorise the Commissioners for the Harbour and Docks of Leith to borrow further money to authorise the Commissioners to borrow by way of temporary loan to extend the time for compulsory purchase of lands authorised by the Leith Harbour and Docks Act 1913 (Note: Leith Harbour and Docks Act 1913 (3 & 4 Geo. 5. c. lxxxvii)) the Leith Harbour and Docks Order 1919 and the Leith Harbour and Docks Order 1925 to make further provision with respect to rates and charges and for other purposes.	
Burghead Burgh and Harbour Order Confirmation Act 1933 (repealed)	23 & 24 Geo. 5. c. lii	28 July 1933
An Act to confirm a Provisional Order under the Private Legislation Procedure (Scotland) Act 1899 relating to Burghead Burgh and Harbour. (Repealed by Grampian Regional Council (Harbours) Order Confirmation Act 1987 (c. x))
	Burghead Burgh and Harbour Order 1933 Provisional Order for the transfer to the provost magistrates and councillors of the burgh of Burghead of the undertaking known as Burghead Harbour to confer powers on them with reference to the said harbour undertaking and the maintenance management and improvement thereof to make provision as to the таximиm dues'and rates leviable at the said harbour and for other purposes.	
Pier and Harbour Orders (Elgin and Lossiemouth and Southwold) Confirmation Act 1933	23 & 24 Geo. 5. c. liii	28 July 1933
An Act to confirm certain Provisional Orders made by the Minister of Transport under the General Pier and Harbour Act 1861 (Note: General Pier and Harbour Act 1861 (24 & 25 Vict. c. 45)) relating to Elgin and Lossiemouth and Southwold.
	Elgin and Lossiemouth Harbour Order 1933 Provisional Order to authorise the Elgin and Lossiemouth Harbour Company to levy and recover new and increased rates and charges and for other purposes.	
	Southwold Harbour Order 1933 Provisional Order to make further provision with respect to the Harbour of Southwold in the County of Suffolk and for other purposes.	
Grampian Electricity Supply Order Confirmation Act 1933 (repealed)	23 & 24 Geo. 5. c. liv	28 July 1933
An Act to confirm a Provisional Order under the Private Legislation Procedure (Scotland) Act 1899 relating to Grampian Electricity Supply. (Repealed by North of Scotland Electricity Order Confirmation Act 1958 (7 & 8 Eliz. 2. c. ii))
	Grampian Electricity Supply Order 1933 Provisional Order to extend the period for the compulsory purchase of lands for the purposes of the Grampian Electricity Supply Act 1922 (Note: Grampian Electricity Supply Act 1922 (12 & 13 Geo. 5. c. lxxix)) and for other purposes.	
London, Midland and Scottish Railway Order Confirmation Act 1933	23 & 24 Geo. 5. c. lv	28 July 1933
An Act to confirm a Provisional Order under the Private Legislation Procedure (Scotland) Act 1899 relating to the London Midland and Scottish Railway.
	London, Midland and Scottish Railway Order 1933 Provisional Order to make provision as to the rates dues and charges leviable at the harbours docks and piers of the London Midland and Scottish Railway Company in Scotland and for other purposes.	
London and North Eastern Railway Order Confirmation Act 1933	23 & 24 Geo. 5. c. lvi	28 July 1933
An Act to confirm a Provisional Order under the Private Legislation Procedure (Scotland) Act, 1899, relating to the London and North Eastern Railway
	London and North Eastern Railway Order 1933	
Ministry of Health Provisional Order Confirmation (Street) Act 1933	23 & 24 Geo. 5. c. lvii	28 July 1933
An Act to confirm a Provisional Order of the Minister of Health relating to the Urban District of Street.
	Street Order 1933	
Ministry of Health Provisional Order Confirmation (Wrexham and East Denbighshire Water) Act 1933	23 & 24 Geo. 5. c. lviii	28 July 1933
An Act to confirm a Provisional Order of the Minister of Health relating to the Wrexham and East Denbighshire Water Company.
	Wrexham and East Denbighshire Water Order 1933	
Ministry of Health Provisional Order Confirmation (Luton Water) Act 1933	23 & 24 Geo. 5. c. lix	28 July 1933
An Act to confirm a Provisional Order of the Minister of Health relating to the Luton Water Company.
	Luton Water Order 1933	
Ministry of Health Provisional Orders Confirmation (Maidstone and Stockton-on-Tees) Act 1933	23 & 24 Geo. 5. c. lx	28 July 1933
An Act to confirm certain Provisional Orders of the Minister of Health relating to Boroughs of Maidstone and Stockton-on-Tees.
	Maidstone Order 1933	
	Stockton-on-Tees Order 1933	
Ministry of Health Provisional Order Confirmation (Mid-Glamorgan Water Board) Act 1933	23 & 24 Geo. 5. c. lxi	28 July 1933
An Act to confirm a Provisional Order of the Minister of Health relating to the district of the Mid-Glamorgan Water Board.
	Mid-Glamorgan Water Order 1933	
Ministry of Health Provisional Order Confirmation (Chepping Wycombe) Act 1933	23 & 24 Geo. 5. c. lxii	28 July 1933
An Act to confirm a Provisional Order of the Minister of Health relating to the Borough of Chepping Wycombe.
	Chepping Wycombe Order 1933	
Ministry of Health Provisional Order Confirmation (South Somerset Joint Hospital District) Act 1933	23 & 24 Geo. 5. c. lxiii	28 July 1933
An Act to confirm a Provisional Order of the Minister of Health relating to the South Somerset Joint Hospital District.
	South Somerset Joint Hospital Order 1933	
Ministry of Health Provisional Order Confirmation (Wath, Swinton and District Joint Hospital District) Act 1933 (repealed)	23 & 24 Geo. 5. c. lxiv	28 July 1933
An Act to confirm a Provisional Order of the Minister of Health relating to the Wath, Swinton, and District Joint Hospital District. (Repealed by Statute Law (Repeals) Act 1989 (c. 43))
	Wath, Swinton, and District Joint Hospital Order 1933	
Ministry of Health Provisional Orders Confirmation (Ely, Holland and Norfolk) Act 1933	23 & 24 Geo. 5. c. lxv	28 July 1933
An Act to confirm certain Provisional Orders of the Minister of Health relating to the Counties of the Isle of Ely, the Parts of Holland, and Norfolk and the Borough of Wisbech.
	Isle of Ely and Norfolk Order 1933	
	Isle of Ely and Parts of Holland Order 1933	
Manchester Ship Canal Act 1933	23 & 24 Geo. 5. c. lxvi	28 July 1933
An Act to provide for the transfer to the Manchester Ship Canal Company of the undertaking of the De Trafford Light Railway Company; to confer further powers on the Manchester Ship Canal Company, and for other purposes.
Wimbledon Corporation Act 1933	23 & 24 Geo. 5. c. lxvii	28 July 1933
An Act to confer further powers on the Wimbledon Corporation in relation to their electricity and cemetery undertakings, lands, street trading, and other matters; to make further and better provision for the improvement, health, and local government of the borough; and for other purposes.
Barking Corporation Act 1933	23 & 24 Geo. 5. c. lxviii	28 July 1933
An Act to alter the boundaries of the borough of Barking; to confer further powers on the Barking Corporation in relation to their electricity and markets undertakings, lands, street trading, and other matters; to make further and better provision for the improvement, health, and local government of the borough, and for other purposes.
Rhondda Passenger Transport Act 1933 (repealed)	23 & 24 Geo. 5. c. lxix	28 July 1933
An Act to make provision as to the abandonment of the tramways of the Rhondda Urban District Council and the termination of the leases thereof to the Rhondda Tramways Company, Limited, and of certain agreements between the Council and the Company; to empower the Council to acquire part of the motor omnibus undertaking of the Company at the end of a term of years; and for other purposes. (Repealed by Mid Glamorgan County Council Act 1987 (c. vii))
Sheffield Extension Act 1933 (repealed)	23 & 24 Geo. 5. c. lxx	28 July 1933
An Act to extend the boundaries of the City of Sheffield, and for other purposes. (Repealed by Statute Law (Repeals) Act 1989 (c. 43))
Gas Light and Coke Company's Act 1933	23 & 24 Geo. 5. c. lxxi	28 July 1933
An Act to confer further powers upon the Gas Light and Coke Company; to prohibit the making by the authorities of districts in the area of supply of that Company of conditions as to the form of heat, light, power, or energy to be supplied or used in certain cases, and for other purposes.
Mablethorpe and Sutton Urban District Council Act 1933	23 & 24 Geo. 5. c. lxxii	28 July 1933
An Act to provide for the transfer to the Mablethorpe and Sutton Urban District Council of the undertaking of the Sutton-on-Sea and District Waterworks Company, Limited; to confer further powers on the Council in regard to their water undertaking; to authorise the Council to acquire certain lands; to make further provision for the health, local government and finance of the district of the Council, and for other purposes.
Bridlington Corporation Act 1933	23 & 24 Geo. 5. c. lxxiii	28 July 1933
An Act to extend the limits for the supply of water by the Bridlington Corporation; to confer further powers upon that Corporation with respect to their water, electricity, and other undertakings; to make better provision for the health, local government, and finance of the Borough, and for other purposes.
Dewsbury Corporation Act 1933	23 & 24 Geo. 5. c. lxxiv	28 July 1933
An Act to confer further powers upon the Mayor, Aldermen, and Burgesses of the County Borough of Dewsbury with regard to the acquisition, retention, development, and disposal of lands; the health, local government, and improvement of the Borough; the water, gas, and electricity undertakings of the Corporation; the regulation of stock; the carrying of receipts from all sources to the general rate fund of the Borough and the making of all payments out of that fund, and for other purposes.
St. Helens Corporation Act 1933	23 & 24 Geo. 5. c. lxxv	28 July 1933
An Act to extend the boundaries of the Borough of St. Helens; to confer further powers upon the Mayor, Aldermen, and Burgesses of the said Borough with regard to the acquisition, retention, development, and disposal of lands, the electricity and water undertakings of the Corporation, the health, local government, and improvement of the Borough, and for other purposes.
Manchester Royal Infirmary Act 1933	23 & 24 Geo. 5. c. lxxvi	28 July 1933
An Act to make provision with reference to the Manchester Royal Infirmary and for other purposes.
Kingston-upon-Hull Corporation Act 1933	23 & 24 Geo. 5. c. lxxvii	28 July 1933
An Act to authorise the Lord Mayor, Aldermen, Corporation and Citizens of the City and County of Kingston-upon-Hull to obtain a supply of water from Farndale and other sources in the North Riding of Yorkshire and to construct waterworks; to abandon certain waterworks authorised by the Kingston-upon-Hull Corporation Act, 1930; (Note: Kingston-upon-Hull Corporation Act 1930 (20 & 21 Geo. 5. c. clxxv)) to make further provision for the health, local government, and improvement of the City, and for other purposes.
Plympton St. Mary Rural District Council Act 1933	23 & 24 Geo. 5. c. lxxviii	28 July 1933
An Act to constitute the Rural District Council of Plympton St. Mary the harbour authority for the estuary and tidal waters of the River Yealm; to confer further powers upon the Council in respect of their water and electricity undertakings and in regard to moveable dwellings and camping grounds; and to make further and better provision for the health, local government, and finance of the district, and for other purposes.
Bootle Corporation Act 1933 (repealed)	23 & 24 Geo. 5. c. lxxix	28 July 1933
An Act to confer powers upon the Mayor, Aldermen, and Burgesses of the borough of Bootle with regard to the running of public service vehicles in the borough and neighbourhood and to make provision with regard to the abandonment and discontinuance of the tramways in the borough, and for other purposes. (Repealed by County of Merseyside Act 1980 (c.x))
Wigan Corporation Act 1933	23 & 24 Geo. 5. c. lxxx	28 July 1933
An Act to make further provision in regard to the road transport, gas and water undertakings of the Mayor, Aldermen, and Burgesses of the Borough of Wigan, and in regard to the health, local government, and improvement of that borough; to provide for the revision of the terms upon which the said Mayor, Aldermen, and Burgesses shall receive and dispose of the sewage from certain areas adjacent to the said borough; to provide for the application of the balance of certain moneys subscribed during the Great War for purposes connected with that war; and for other purposes.
Canterbury Extension Act 1933 (repealed)	23 & 24 Geo. 5. c. lxxxi	28 July 1933
An Act to extend the boundaries of the city of Canterbury and county of the same city; and for purposes incidental thereto. (Repealed by County of Kent Act 1981 (c. xviii))
Dover Harbour Act 1933 (repealed)	23 & 24 Geo. 5. c. lxxxii	28 July 1933
An Act to authorise the construction of certain new works for improving the harbour of Dover; to alter the constitution of the Dover Harbour Board; to empower the Dover Harbour Board to conduct a cross-channel service of vessels; and for other purposes. (Repealed by Dover Harbour Consolidation Act 1954 (2 & 3 Eliz. 2. c. iv))
Middlesbrough Corporation Act 1933	23 & 24 Geo. 5. c. lxxxiii	28 July 1933
An Act to consolidate, with amendments, the local Acts and Orders in force within the borough of Middlesbrough and relating to the several undertakings of the Middlesbrough Corporation; to confer further powers upon the Corporation in relation to those undertakings and other matters; to make better provision for the health, local government, improvement, and finance of the borough, and for other purposes.
Knutsford Light and Water Act 1933	23 & 24 Geo. 5. c. lxxxiv	28 July 1933
An Act to confer further powers upon the Knutsford Light and Water Company; to provide for the supply of water in bulk by the Manchester Corporation to that company; and for other purposes.
East Hull Gas Act 1933	23 & 24 Geo. 5. c. lxxxv	28 July 1933
An Act to consolidate (with amendments) the special Acts and the Orders relating to the East Hull Gas Company; to make new provisions as to the charges for the gas supplied by and the application of the profits of the Company; to authorise the Company to raise further capital; and for other purposes.
South Metropolitan Gas Act 1933	23 & 24 Geo. 5. c. lxxxvi	28 July 1933
An Act to amend the enactments relating to the issue of capital by the South Metropolitan Gas Company, and for other purposes.
Maldens and Coombe Urban District Council Act 1933	23 & 24 Geo. 5. c. lxxxvii	28 July 1933
An Act to authorise the acquisition and management by the Urban District Council of The Maidens and Coombe of certain lands now used as golf courses; to make special provision with regard to the repair of certain private roads and the recovery of an improvement rate from the occupiers of buildings in the neighbourhood; to confer further powers on the Council in relation to the improvement, health, and local government of their district, and for other purposes.
Adelphi Estate Act 1933	23 & 24 Geo. 5. c. lxxxviii	28 July 1933
An Act to repeal certain statutory restrictions upon the use of part of the Adelphi Estate; to authorise the widening of certain existing streets and the construction of new streets and the stopping up of an existing street on that Estate, and for other purposes.
Salford Corporation Act 1933	23 & 24 Geo. 5. c. lxxxix	28 July 1933
An Act to empower the Mayor, Aldermen, and Citizens of the City of Salford to execute street works and to acquire lands for those and other purposes; to confer powers upon them of running trolley vehicles; to make various provisions and to confer various powers with respect to the several undertakings of the Corporation, and in regard to the health and finance, and for the good government of the city; and for other purposes.
Samaritan Free Hospital for Women Act 1933 (repealed)	23 & 24 Geo. 5. c. xc	28 July 1933
AnAct to enable the Samaritan Free Hospital for Women to provide and equip additional accommodation and to make certain charges therefor, and for other purposes. (Repealed by Statute Law (Repeals) Act 2013 (c. 2))
Ministry of Health Provisional Order Confirmation (Warwick) Act 1933 (repealed)	23 & 24 Geo. 5. c. xci	17 November 1933
An Act to confirm a Provisional Order of the Minister of Health relating to the Borough of Warwick. (Repealed by Statute Law (Repeals) Act 1995 (c. 44))
	Warwick Order 1933	
Ministry of Health Provisional Order Confirmation (Wellington, Salop.) Act 1933	23 & 24 Geo. 5. c. xcii	17 November 1933
An Act to confirm a Provisional Order of the Minister of Health relating to the Urban District of Wellington, in the County of Salop.
	Wellington (Salop.) Order 1933	

=== Private acts ===
Short title	Citation	Royal assent
Long title
Grosvenor Estate Act 1933	23 & 24 Geo. 5. c. 1 Pr.	28 July 1933
An Act to vary the limitations and trusts of an indenture dated the fifteenth day of February one thousand nine hundred and one and executed by the Most Noble Hugh Richard Arthur Duke of Westminster D.S.O.

== 24 & 25 Geo. 5 ==
The third session of the 36th Parliament of the United Kingdom, which met from 21 November 1933 until 16 November 1934.

This session was also traditionally cited as 24 & 25 G. 5.

=== Public general acts ===
Short title	Citation	Royal assent
Long title
Agricultural Marketing (No. 2) Act 1933 (repealed)	24 & 25 Geo. 5. c. 1	21 December 1933
An Act to make further provision with respect to the financial powers of boards administering schemes under the Agricultural Marketing Act, 1931, (Note: Agricultural Marketing Act 1931 (21 & 22 Geo. 5. c. 42)) and with respect to the contents of such schemes; to extend the power to make loans to such boards under section thirteen of the said Act; and for purposes connected with the matters aforesaid. (Repealed by Agricultural Marketing Act 1958 (6 & 7 Eliz. 2. c. 47))
Newfoundland Act 1933 (repealed)	24 & 25 Geo. 5. c. 2	21 December 1933
An Act to empower His Majesty to issue Letters Patent making provision with respect to the administration of Newfoundland, to authorise the making out of public moneys of advances to the Government of Newfoundland and the guaranteeing by the Treasury of stock to be issued by that Government, and to amend the Colonial Development Act, 1929, (Note: Colonial Development Act 1929 (20 & 21 Geo. 5. c. 5)) in its application to Newfoundland. (Repealed by British North America Act 1949 (12, 13 & 14 Geo. 6. c. 22) and Statute Law (Repeals) Act 1969 (c. 52))

=== Local acts ===
Short title	Citation	Royal assent
Long title
Public Works Facilities Scheme (Witney Urban District Council) Confirmation Act 1933	24 & 25 Geo. 5. c. i	21 December 1933
An Act to confirm a Scheme made by the Minister of Health under the Public Works Facilities Act, 1930, (Note: Public Works Facilities Act 1930 (20 & 21 Geo. 5. c. 50)) relating to the Urban District Council of Witney.
	Witney Urban District Council (Waterworks) Scheme	
Public Works Facilities Scheme Thames Conservancy (River Improvement) Confirmation Act 1933	24 & 25 Geo. 5. c. ii	21 December 1933
An Act to confirm a Scheme made by the Minister of Transport under the Public Works Facilities Act, 1930, relating to the Conservators of the River Thames.
	Thames Conservancy (River Improvement) Scheme	
Greenock Corporation Order Confirmation Act 1933	24 & 25 Geo. 5. c. iii	21 December 1933
An Act to confirm a Provisional Order under the Private Legislation Procedure (Scotland) Acts, 1899 (Note: Private Legislation Procedure (Scotland) Act 1899 (62 & 63 Vict. c. 47)) and 1933, (Note: Private Legislation Procedure (Scotland) Act 1933 (23 & 24 Geo. 5. c. 37)) relating to Greenock Corporation.
	Greenock Corporation Order 1933	
Kirkcaldy Corporation Order Confirmation Act 1933 (repealed)	24 & 25 Geo. 5. c. iv	21 December 1933
An Act to confirm a Provisional Order under the Private Legislation Procedure (Scotland) Acts, 1899 and 1933, relating to Kirkcaldy Corporation. (Repealed by Kirkcaldy Corporation Order Confirmation Act 1939 (2 & 3 Geo. 6. c. vi))
	Kirkcaldy Corporation Order 1933	
Edinburgh Corporation Order Confirmation Act 1933	24 & 25 Geo. 5. c. v	21 December 1933
An Act to confirm a Provisional Order under the Private Legislation Procedure (Scotland) Acts, 1899 and 1933, relating to Edinburgh Corporation.
	Edinburgh Corporation Order 1933	
Ministry of Health Provisional Order Confirmation (Worthing) Act 1933	24 & 25 Geo. 5. c. vi	21 December 1933
An Act to confirm a Provisional Order of the Minister of Health relating to the Borough of Worthing.
	Worthing Order 1933	

== See also ==
- List of acts of the Parliament of the United Kingdom
