= Solicitors (Ireland) Act 1849 =

Act of the Parliament of the United Kingdom

Solicitors (Ireland) Act 1849 (Note: The citation of this act by this short title was authorised by section 1 of, and the first schedule to, the Short Titles Act 1896. Due to the repeal of those provisions it is now authorised by section 19(2) of the Interpretation Act 1978.)
- Act of Parliament
- Parliament of the United Kingdom
- Long title: An Act for consolidating and amending several of the Laws relating to Attornies and Solicitors in Ireland.
- Citation: 12 & 13 Vict. c. 53
- Territorial extent: United Kingdom

Dates
- Royal assent: 28 July 1849
- Commencement: 28 July 1849 (Note: The Acts of Parliament (Commencement) Act 1793.)
Other legislation
Amends	Relief of Mortgages Act 1733
Repeals/revokes	Attorneys and Solicitors (Ireland) Act 1821

Status: Current legislation

Text of statute as originally enacted

The Solicitors (Ireland) Act 1849 (12 & 13 Vict. c. 53) is an act of the Parliament of the United Kingdom that consolidated enactments relating to solicitors in Ireland.

== Provisions ==
Section 1 of the act repealed so much of the Relief of Mortgages Act 1733 (7 Geo. 2. c. 14 (I)) "as relates to the better regulating the Payment of the Fees of Attornies and Solicitors" and the whole of the Attorneys and Solicitors (Ireland) Act 1821 (1 & 2 Geo. 4. c. 17).

== Subsequent developments ==
As of 2025, the act remains in force in Northern Ireland.
