= Solicitors (Scotland) Act 1933 =

Act of the Parliament of the United Kingdom

Solicitors (Scotland) Act 1933 (Note: Section 52.)
- Act of Parliament
- Parliament of the United Kingdom
- Long title: An Act to consolidate and amend the law relating to Solicitors and Notaries Public in Scotland.
- Citation: 23 & 24 Geo. 5. c. 21
- Territorial extent: Scotland (Note: Section 52.)

Dates
- Royal assent: 28 June 1933
- Commencement: 28 June 1933 (Part I) and 1 March 1934 (remainder) (Note: Section 52.)
- Repealed: 1 September 1980
Other legislation
Amends	See § Repealed enactments
Repeals/revokes	See § Repealed enactments
Amended by	Administration of Justice (Scotland) Act 1933; Solicitors, Public Notaries, &c. Act 1949; Legal Aid and Solicitors (Scotland) Act 1949
Repealed by	Solicitors (Scotland) Act 1980
Relates to	Solicitors Act 1932

Status: Repealed

Text of statute as originally enacted

The Solicitors (Scotland) Act 1933 (23 & 24 Geo. 5. c. 21) was an act of the Parliament of the United Kingdom that consolidated enactments relating to solicitors and notaries public in Scotland.

The Solicitors Act 1932 (22 & 23 Geo. 5. c. 37) made equivalent provisions for England and Wales.

== Provisions ==
=== Repealed enactments ===
Section 51 of the act repealed 5 enactments, listed in the third schedule to the act.

Citation	Short title	Extent of repeal
36 & 37 Vict. c. 63	Law Agents (Scotland) Act 1873	The whole act.
54 & 55 Vict. c. 30	Law Agents and Notaries Public (Scotland) Act 1891	The whole act.
54 & 55 Vict. c. 39	Stamp Act 1891	Section forty-four.
59 & 60 Vict. c. 49	Law Agents (Scotland) Act Amendment Act 1896	The whole act.
11 & 12 Geo. 5. c. 32	Finance Act 1921	Section sixty.

== Subsequent developments ==
The whole act was repealed by section 66(2) of, and schedule 7 to, the Solicitors (Scotland) Act 1980 (c. 46), which came into operation on 1 September 1980.
