= List of acts of the Parliament of Great Britain from 1756 =

This is a complete list of acts of the Parliament of Great Britain for the year 1756.

For acts passed until 1707, see the list of acts of the Parliament of England and the list of acts of the Parliament of Scotland. See also the list of acts of the Parliament of Ireland.

For acts passed from 1801 onwards, see the list of acts of the Parliament of the United Kingdom. For acts of the devolved parliaments and assemblies in the United Kingdom, see the list of acts of the Scottish Parliament, the list of acts of the Northern Ireland Assembly, and the list of acts and measures of Senedd Cymru; see also the list of acts of the Parliament of Northern Ireland.

The number shown after each act's title is its chapter number. Acts are cited using this number, preceded by the year(s) of the reign during which the relevant parliamentary session was held; thus the Union with Ireland Act 1800 is cited as "39 & 40 Geo. 3. c. 67", meaning the 67th act passed during the session that started in the 39th year of the reign of George III and which finished in the 40th year of that reign. Note that the modern convention is to use Arabic numerals in citations (thus "41 Geo. 3" rather than "41 Geo. III"). Acts of the last session of the Parliament of Great Britain and the first session of the Parliament of the United Kingdom are both cited as "41 Geo. 3".

Acts passed by the Parliament of Great Britain did not have a short title; however, some of these acts have subsequently been given a short title by acts of the Parliament of the United Kingdom (such as the Short Titles Act 1896).

Before the Acts of Parliament (Commencement) Act 1793 came into force on 8 April 1793, acts passed by the Parliament of Great Britain were deemed to have come into effect on the first day of the session in which they were passed. Because of this, the years given in the list below may in fact be the year before a particular act was passed.

== 29 Geo. 2 ==
The third session of the 11th Parliament of Great Britain, which met from 13 November 1755 until 15 July 1756.

This session was also traditionally cited as 29 G. 2.

=== Public acts ===
Short title	Citation	Royal assent
Long title
Taxation Act 1756 (repealed)	29 Geo. 2. c. 1	10 December 1755
An Act for continuing and granting to His Majesty certain Duties upon Malt, Mum, Cyder, and Perry, for the Service of the Year One Thousand Seven Hundred and Fifty-six. (Repealed by Statute Law Revision Act 1867 (30 & 31 Vict. c. 59))
Land Tax Act 1756 (repealed)	29 Geo. 2. c. 2	23 December 1755
An Act for granting an Aid to His Majesty, by a Land Tax, to be raised in Great Britain, for the Service of the Year One Thousand Seven Hundred and Fifty-six; and for the Relief of the Inhabitants of the City and County of the City of Lincoln, in respect of Arrears of the Land Tax. (Repealed by Statute Law Revision Act 1867 (30 & 31 Vict. c. 59))
Mutiny Act 1756 (repealed)	29 Geo. 2. c. 3	23 December 1755
An Act for punishing Mutiny and Desertion; and for the better Payment of the Army and their Quarters. (Repealed by Statute Law Revision Act 1867 (30 & 31 Vict. c. 59))
Recruiting Act 1756 (repealed)	29 Geo. 2. c. 4	9 March 1756
An Act for the speedy and effectual Recruiting of His Majesty's Land Forces and Marines. (Repealed by Statute Law Revision Act 1867 (30 & 31 Vict. c. 59))
Commissions to Foreign Protestants Act 1756 (repealed)	29 Geo. 2. c. 5	9 March 1756
An Act to enable His Majesty to grant Commissions to a certain Number of Foreign Protestants, who have served Abroad as Officers or Engineers, to act and rank as Officers or Engineers in America only, under certain Restrictions and Qualifications. (Repealed by Statute Law Revision Act 1867 (30 & 31 Vict. c. 59))
Marine Mutiny Act 1756 (repealed)	29 Geo. 2. c. 6	9 March 1756
An Act for the Regulation of His Majesty's Marine Forces while on Shore. (Repealed by Statute Law Revision Act 1867 (30 & 31 Vict. c. 59))
National Debt Act 1756 (repealed)	29 Geo. 2. c. 7	9 March 1756
An Act for granting to His Majesty the Sum of Two Millions, to be raised by Way of Annuities and a Lottery, and charged on the Sinking Fund, redeemable by Parliament; and for extending to Ireland the Laws made in this Kingdom against private and unlawful Lotteries. (Repealed by Statute Law Revision Act 1870 (33 & 34 Vict. c. 69))
Quarantine Act 1756 (repealed)	29 Geo. 2. c. 8	9 March 1756
An Act to repeal a Clause in an Act made in the Twenty-sixth Year of His present Majesty, intituled, "An Act to oblige Ships more effectually to perform their Quarantine; and for the better preventing the Plague being brought from Foreign Parts into Great Britain or Ireland, or the Isles of Guernsey, Jersey, Alderney, Sark, or Man;" (Note: Quarantine Act 1753 (26 Geo. 2. c. 6)) whereby the stationing of Ships infected with the Plague to the Northward of Cape Finisterre is confined to the Harbour of New Grimsby, and removeable to no other Place; and for appointing a more safe and commodious Place instead thereof. (Repealed for England and Wales and Scotland by Quarantine Act 1800 (39 & 40 Geo. 3. c. 80) and for Northern Ireland by Statute Law Revision Act 1950 (14 Geo. 6. c. 6))
Bedford Level Act 1756	29 Geo. 2. c. 9	9 March 1756
An Act for establishing a Fund for Payment of the Bonds of the Governor, Bailiffs, and Commonalty, of the Company of the Conservators of the Great Level of the Fens, called Bedford Level; and for exchanging the present Bonds of the said Corporation for other Bonds payable out of the Revenues of the Middle and South Levels, Part of the said Great Level; and for enabling the said Corporation to borrow further Sums, for the Use of the said Great Level.
Poole Harbour Act 1756 (repealed)	29 Geo. 2. c. 10	15 April 1756
An Act for the better ascertaining, recovering, and collecting, certain Duties payable upon the Importation and Exportation of Goods and Merchandizes into or out of the Harbour of the Town and County of Poole, and also of the Ballast and Boomage Duties payable in Respect of Ships and Vessels coming into and going out of the said Harbour; and for the enlarging, better repairing, and keeping in Repair, the said Harbour, and the Quays and Wharfs; and for providing a proper Place for keeping Gunpowder in or near the said Town; and for establishing and regulating the Nightly Watch, and enlightening the Streets, in the said Town. (Repealed by Pier and Harbour Order Confirmation (No. 3) Act 1891 (54 & 55 Vict. c. clix), Poole Harbour Revision Order 2001 (SI 2001/2820) and Poole Harbour Revision Order 2012 (SI 2012/1777))
Navigation Act 1756 (repealed)	29 Geo. 2. c. 11	15 April 1756
An Act for the better Supply of Mariners and Seamen, to serve in His Majesty's Ships of War, and on Board Merchant Ships and other Trading Ships and Vessels. (Repealed by Statute Law Revision Act 1867 (30 & 31 Vict. c. 59))
Alehouses Act 1756 (repealed)	29 Geo. 2. c. 12	15 April 1756
An Act for granting to His Majesty a Duty upon Licenses for retailing Beer, Ale, and other Exciseable Liquors; and for establishing a Method of granting such Licenses in Scotland; and for allowing such Licenses to be granted at a Petty Session in England, in a certain Case therein mentioned. (Repealed by Statute Law Revision Act 1867 (30 & 31 Vict. c. 59))
Taxation (No. 2) Act 1756 (repealed)	29 Geo. 2. c. 13	15 April 1756
An Act for granting to His Majesty an additional Duty on Cards and Dice. (Repealed by Stamp Duties on Cards and Dice Act 1828 (9 Geo. 4. c. 18))
Taxation (No. 3) Act 1756 (repealed)	29 Geo. 2. c. 14	15 April 1756
An Act for granting to His Majesty several Rates and Duties, payable by all Persons and Bodies Politick or Corporate, having certain Quantities of Silver Plate. (Repealed by Taxation (No. 2) Act 1776 (17 Geo. 3. c. 39))
Exportation Act 1756 (repealed)	29 Geo. 2. c. 15	15 April 1756
An Act for granting a Bounty upon certain Species of British and Irish Linens exported; and taking off the Duties on the Importation of Foreign Raw Linen Yarns made of Flax. (Repealed by Customs Law Repeal Act 1825 (6 Geo. 4. c. 105))
Exportation (No. 2) Act 1756 (repealed)	29 Geo. 2. c. 16	15 April 1756
An Act to empower His Majesty to prohibit the Exportation of Saltpetre; and to enforce the Law for empowering His Majesty to prohibit the Exportation of Gunpowder, or any Sort of Arms and Ammunition; and also to empower His Majesty to restrain the carrying Coastwife of Saltpetre, Gunpowder, or any Sort of Arms or Ammunition. (Repealed by Customs Law Repeal Act 1825 (6 Geo. 4. c. 105))
Foreign Enlistment Act 1756 (repealed)	29 Geo. 2. c. 17	15 April 1756
An Act to prevent His Majesty's Subjects from serving as Officers under the French King; and for the better enforcing an Act passed in the Ninth Year of His present Majesty's Reign, (Note: Foreign Enlistment Act 1735 (9 Geo. 2. c. 30)) to prevent the enlisting His Majesty's Subjects to serve as Soldiers without His Majesty's License; and for obliging such of His Majesty's Subjects as shall accept Commissions in the Scotch Brigade, in the Service of The States General of the United Provinces, to take the Oaths of Allegiance and Abjuration. (Repealed by Foreign Enlistment Act 1819 (59 Geo. 3. c. 69))
Insolvent Debtors Relief Act 1756 (repealed)	29 Geo. 2. c. 18	15 April 1756
An Act to obviate a Doubt arisen on an Act made in the last Session of Parliament, intituled, "An Act for Relief of Insolvent Debtors," (Note: Insolvent Debtors Relief Act 1755 (28 Geo. 2. c. 13)) and for Relief of Sheriffs and Keepers of Prisons, in respect to Escapes of such Persons as were prevented by the said Doubt from being discharged under the said Act. (Repealed by Statute Law Revision Act 1867 (30 & 31 Vict. c. 59))
Juries Act 1756 (repealed)	29 Geo. 2. c. 19	15 April 1756
An Act to empower Judges of Courts of Record, in Cities and Towns Corporate, Liberties, and Franchises, to set Fines on Persons who shall be summoned to serve upon Juries in such Courts, and shall neglect to attend. (Repealed by Juries Act 1825 (6 Geo. 4. c. 50))
Little Cumbrae Lighthouse Act 1756 (repealed)	29 Geo. 2. c. 20	15 April 1756
An Act for erecting, maintaining, and supporting, a Light-house on the Island of Little Cumray in the County of Bute, at the Mouth of the River Clyde in North Britain; and for rendering the Navigation in the Frith and River of Clyde more safe and commodious. (Repealed by Clyde Lighthouses Consolidation Order Confirmation Act 1940 (3 & 4 Geo. 6. c. xlii))
Isle of Ely Drainage Act 1756	29 Geo. 2. c. 21	15 April 1756
An Act for embanking and preserving certain Fen Lands and Low Grounds, called The Washes, lying and being in the several Parishes of Sutton, Mepal, Witcham, Ely, Witchford, Wentworth, Coveney, and Downham in the Isle of Ely and County of Cambridge, and of Bluntisham with Earith in the County of Huntingdon.
Hundred Foot River and Ouse (Bedford Level) Act 1756	29 Geo. 2. c. 22	15 April 1756
An Act for draining and preserving certain Fen Lands in the Isle of Ely and County of Norfolk, lying between The Hundred Foot River and The Ouze, and bounded on the South by the Hard Lands of Mepal, Witcham, Wentworth, Witchford, Ely, Downham, and Littleport; and for empowering the Governor, Bailiffs, and Commonalty, of the Company of Conservators of the Great Level of the Fens, commonly called Bedford Level, to sell certain Lands, lying within the Limits aforesaid, commonly called Invested Lands.
Fisheries (Scotland) Act 1756 (repealed)	29 Geo. 2. c. 23	27 May 1756
An Act for encouraging the Fisheries in that Part of Great Britain called Scotland. (Repealed by Inshore Fishing (Scotland) Act 1984 (c. 26))
Supply Act 1756 (repealed)	29 Geo. 2. c. 24	27 May 1756
An Act for granting to His Majesty certain Sums out of the Sinking Fund; and applying certain Monies, remaining in the Exchequer, for the Service of the Year One Thousand Seven Hundred and Fifty-six. (Repealed by Statute Law Revision Act 1867 (30 & 31 Vict. c. 59))
Westminster Act 1756 (repealed)	29 Geo. 2. c. 25	27 May 1756
An Act for appointing a sufficient Number of Constables for the Service of the City and Liberty of Westminster; and to compel proper Persons to take upon them the Office of Jurymen, to present Nuisances and other Offences within the said City and Liberty. (Repealed by %[%[London Government (City of Westminster) Order in Council 1901]] (SR&O [[List of statutory rules and orders of the United Kingdom#19011901%]%]/1811))
Sugar Colonies, etc. Act 1756 (repealed)	29 Geo. 2. c. 26	27 May 1756
An Act for further continuing an Act of the Sixth Year of the Reign of His present Majesty, (Note: Trade of Sugar Colonies Act 1732 (6 Geo. 2. c. 13)) for securing and encouraging the Trade of His Majesty's Sugar Colonies in America; to indemnify Commissioners of the Land Tax for Counties at large, and Ridings, who have acted by virtue of Leasehold Estates; and to obviate a Doubt relating to the Qualification of Commissioners of the Land Tax for the City and Liberty of Westminster. (Repealed by Statute Law Revision Act 1867 (30 & 31 Vict. c. 59))
Navy Act 1756 (repealed)	29 Geo. 2. c. 27	27 May 1756
An Act for extending the Act of the Twenty-second Year of His present Majesty, (Note: Navy Act 1748 (22 Geo. 2. c. 33)) for amending, explaining, and reducing into One Act of Parliament, the Laws relating to the Government of His Majesty's Ships, Vessels, and Forces by Sea, to such Officers, Seamen, and others, as shall serve on Board His Majesty's Ships or Vessels employed upon the Lakes, Great Waters, or Rivers, in North America. (Repealed by Naval Discipline Act 1860 (23 & 24 Vict. c. 123))
Continuance of Laws Act 1756 (repealed)	29 Geo. 2. c. 28	27 May 1756
An Act for reviving and continuing an Act (Note: Insolvent Debtors Relief (No. 2) Act 1728 (2 Geo. 2. c. 22)) for the Relief of Debtors, with respect to the Imprisonment of their Persons; and for continuing an Act, made in the last Session of Parliament, (Note: Distemper Amongst Cattle Act 1755 (28 Geo. 2. c. 18)) to continue several Laws relating to the Distemper now raging among the Horned Cattle in this Kingdom. (Repealed by Statute Law Revision Act 1867 (30 & 31 Vict. c. 59))
Supply, etc. Act 1756 (repealed)	29 Geo. 2. c. 29	27 May 1756
An Act for enabling His Majesty to raise One Million, for the Purpose therein mentioned; and for the further appropriating the Supplies granted in this Session of Parliament. (Repealed by Statute Law Revision Act 1867 (30 & 31 Vict. c. 59))
Stealing of Lead, etc. Act 1756 (repealed)	29 Geo. 2. c. 30	27 May 1756
An Act for more effectually discouraging and preventing the stealing, and the buying and receiving of stolen, Lead, Iron, Copper, Brass, Bellmetal, and Solder; and for more effectually bringing the Offenders to Justice. (Repealed for England and Wales by Criminal Statutes Repeal Act 1827 (7 & 8 Geo. 4. c. 27) and for India by Criminal Law (India) Act 1828 (9 Geo. 4. c. 74))
Infants, Lunatics, etc. Act 1756 (repealed)	29 Geo. 2. c. 31	27 May 1756
An Act to enable Infants, Lunaticks, and Femmes Covert, to surrender Leases, in order to renew the same. (Repealed by Infants' Property Act 1830 (11 Geo. 4. & 1 Will. 4. c. 65))
Indemnity (No. 2) Act 1756 (repealed)	29 Geo. 2. c. 32	27 May 1756
An Act to indemnify Persons who have omitted to qualify themselves, according to the Directions of several Acts of Parliament, within the Times limited by such Acts respectively; and for allowing further Time for that Purpose; and concerning the Admissions of Officers and Members of Cities, Corporations, and Borough Towns, and the filing of Affidavits of Articles of Clerkship. (Repealed by Statute Law Revision Act 1867 (30 & 31 Vict. c. 59))
Woollen Manufacture Act 1756 (repealed)	29 Geo. 2. c. 33	27 May 1756
An Act to render more effectual an Act, passed in the Twelfth Year of the Reign of His late Majesty King George, (Note: Woollen Manufactures Act 1725 (12 Geo. 1. c. 34)) to prevent the unlawful Combination of Workmen employed in the Woollen Manufactures, and for better Payment of their Wages; and also an Act, passed in the Thirteenth Year of the Reign of His said late Majesty, (Note: Woollen Manufacture Act 1726 (13 Geo. 1. c. 23)) for the better Regulation of the Woollen Manufacture, and for preventing Disputes among the Persons concerned therein; and for limiting a Time for prosecuting for the Forfeiture appointed by the aforesaid Act, in case of the Payment of the Workmen's Wages in any other Manner than in Money. (Repealed by Statute Law Revision Act 1867 (30 & 31 Vict. c. 59))
Naval Prize, etc. Act 1756 (repealed)	29 Geo. 2. c. 34	27 May 1756
An Act for the Encouragement of Seamen; and the more speedy and effectual manning His Majesty's Navy. (Repealed by Naval Prize Acts Repeal Act 1864 (27 & 28 Vict. c. 23))
Recruiting, etc., America Act 1756 (repealed)	29 Geo. 2. c. 35	27 May 1756
An Act for the better recruiting of His Majesty's Forces on the Continent of America; and for the better Regulation of the Army, and preventing Desertion there. (Repealed by Statute Law Revision Act 1867 (30 & 31 Vict. c. 59))
Inclosure Act 1756 (repealed)	29 Geo. 2. c. 36	27 May 1756
An Act for enclosing, by the mutual Consent of the Lord and Tenants, Part of any Common, for the Purpose of planting or preserving Trees fit for Timber or Underwood; and for more effectually preventing the unlawful Destruction of Trees. (Repealed by Commons Act 1899 (62 & 63 Vict. c. 30))
Court Baron, Sheffield Act 1756 (repealed)	29 Geo. 2. c. 37	27 May 1756
An Act for regulating the Proceedings in Personal Actions in the Courts Baron of the Manors of Sheffield and Ecclesall, in the County of York. (Repealed by Sheffield and Ecclesall Courts Baron Act 1808 (48 Geo. 3. c. ciii))
Westminster Bridge Act 1756 (repealed)	29 Geo. 2. c. 38	27 May 1756
An Act to enable the Commissioners for building a Bridge cross the River Thames, from the City of Westminster, to the opposite Shore in the County of Surry, to purchase Houses and Grounds, and to widen the Ways, and make more safe and commodious the Streets, Avenues, and Passages, leading from Charing Cross to the Two Houses of Parliament, Westminster Hall, and the Courts of Justice there, and Westminster Bridge; and to enable a less Number of Commissioners to execute the several Acts relating to the said Bridge than at present are required by Law; and for Relief of George and James King, with regard to a Lease taken by their late Father from the said Commissioners. (Repealed by Westminster Bridge Act 1853 (16 & 17 Vict. c. 46))
Fish Act 1756 (repealed)	29 Geo. 2. c. 39	27 May 1756
An Act for explaining, amending, and rendering more effectual, an Act made in the Twenty-second Year of His present Majesty's Reign, (Note: Fish Market, Westminster Act 1748 (22 Geo. 2. c. 49)) intituled, "An Act for making a free Market for the Sale of Fish in the City of Westminster, and for preventing the forestalling and monopolizing of Fish; and for allowing the Sale of Fish under the Dimensions mentioned in a Clause contained in an Act of the First Year of His late Majesty's Reign, (Note: Fish Act 1714 (1 Geo. 1. St. 2. c. 18)) in case the same are taken with a Hook." (Repealed by Statute Law Revision Act 1867 (30 & 31 Vict. c. 59))
London Bridge Act 1756 or the London Bridge Improvement Act 1756	29 Geo. 2. c. 40	27 May 1756
An Act to improve, widen, and enlarge, the Passage over and through London Bridge.
Shoreditch to Stamford Hill Road Act 1756 (repealed)	29 Geo. 2. c. 41	23 December 1755
An Act for explaining and amending Two Acts of Parliament; one, made in the Eleventh Year of His present Majesty's Reign (Note: Shoreditch to Stamford Hill Road Act 1737 (11 Geo. 2. c. 29)) (for repairing the Road from Shoreditch Church, through Hackney, to Stanford Hill, and cross Cambridge Heath, over Bethnal Green, to the Turnpike at Mile End, in the County of Middlesex); and the other, made in the Twenty-sixth Year of His Majesty's Reign (Note: Shoreditch Road Act 1753 (26 Geo. 2. c. 55)) (for enlarging the Term and Powers granted by the said former Act); and for empowering the Trustees to erect and maintain Lamps, and keep a Guard, upon the said Roads, in the Night-time. (Repealed by Road from Shoreditch Church through Hackney Act 1821 (1 & 2 Geo. 4. c. cxii))
Saint Mary, Newington Butts, Churchyard Act 1756	29 Geo. 2. c. 42	23 December 1755
An Act for enlarging the Cemetery, or Churchyard, of the Parish of Saint Mary, Newington Butts, in the County of Surry.
Bethnal Green Road Act 1756 (repealed)	29 Geo. 2. c. 43	9 March 1756
An Act for making and widening a Road from the East Side of the Parish of Saint Mathew Bethnal Green, in the County of Middlesex, to the East End of Church Street in the said Parish; and to open a Way or Road into Shoreditch, and keeping the same in Repair. (Repealed by Statute Law (Repeals) Act 2013 (c. 2))
Old Street Road Act 1756 (repealed)	29 Geo. 2. c. 44	9 March 1756
An Act to enable the Trustees for repairing Old Street Road to repair, widen, and make; a Road from the Sign of The Red Lion on Windmill-hill, through Worship Street, to the Ditch Side next the East Side of Holy Well Mount, and through a certain Ground to the Sign of The London Apprentice, in the Parishes of Saint Luke and Saint Leonard Shoreditch, in the County of Middlesex; or to lay open, repair, and widen a Road, from the said Red Lion, through The Dog Bar, into The Old Street Road, in the said County. (Repealed by Metropolis Roads Act 1826 (7 Geo. 4. c. cxlii))
Wiltshire and Southampton Roads Act 1756 (repealed)	29 Geo. 2. c. 45	9 March 1756
An Act for repairing and widening the Roads leading from a Pond belonging to Henry Eyre Esquire, in the Parish of White Parish in the County of Wilts, to the Top of Dunwood Hill, and from thence, over Great-bridge and Middle-bridge, through Romseyinfra, to Hundred-bridge in the County of Southampton, and from thence to the County of the Town of Southampton. (Repealed by Whiteparish, Romsey and Southampton Turnpike Roads Act 1824 (5 Geo. 4. c. lxxxiii))
Stockbridge Roads Act 1756 (repealed)	29 Geo. 2. c. 46	9 March 1756
An Act for repairing and widening the High Roads from Basingstoke, through Popham Lane, Sutton, Scotney, and Stockbridge, in the County of Southampton, to a Place called Lodcomb Corner in the County of Wilts; and also for repairing and widening the Road from Spittlehouse, over Weyhill, to Mullen's Pond in the said County of Southampton. (Repealed by Basingstoke and Lobcombe Corner Road Act 1821 (1 & 2 Geo. 4. c. xxv) and Basingstoke, Stockbridge and Lobcomb Corner Turnpike Roads Act 1855 (18 & 19 Vict. c. civ))
Bristol Watch Act 1756 (repealed)	29 Geo. 2. c. 47	9 March 1756
An Act to explain, amend, and render more effectual, an Act made in the last Session of Parliament, intituled, "An Act for establishing, maintaining, and well-governing, a Nightly Watch within the City of Bristol." (Note: Bristol (Nightly Watch) Act 1755 (28 Geo. 2. c. 32)) (Repealed by Municipal Corporations Act 1835 (5 & 6 Will. 4. c. 76))
Derby Gaol Act 1756 (repealed)	29 Geo. 2. c. 48	9 March 1756
An Act for re-building the Common Gaol for the County of Derby, upon a Place called Nun's Green, in the Liberty of the Town of Derby; and for appointing a proper Place for the safe Custody of Prisoners till such new Gaol shall be compleated; and to empower the Justices of the Peace for the said County to pay the Rent reserved to the Corporation for the said Ground, out of the County Rates. (Repealed by Statute Law Revision Act 1948 (11 & 12 Geo. 6. c. 62))
Wincanton Roads Act 1756 (repealed)	29 Geo. 2. c. 49	9 March 1756
An Act for repairing and widening the Road from the Eighteen Mile Stone beyond Willoughby Hedge, through the Town of Mere, in the County of Wilts, and through Wincanton to Charlton Houthorn, and from thence to Milborn Port, and from Willoughby Hedge aforesaid to the West End of Long Lane in Kilmington, and from Wincanton aforesaid to the Sherborn Turnpike Cross Gate on Cattle Hill, and from Wincanton to Sparkford, in the County of Somerset. (Repealed by Wincanton Roads Act 1818 (58 Geo. 3. c. xlv) and Annual Turnpike Acts Continuance Act 1873 (36 & 37 Vict. c. 90))
Bruton Roads Act 1756 (repealed)	29 Geo. 2. c. 50	9 March 1756
An Act for repairing and widening several Roads leading from and near the Town of Brewton, in the County of Somerset. (Repealed by Wiltshire and Somerset Roads Act 1793 (33 Geo. 3. c. 155) and Roads to and through Frome Act 1831 (1 & 2 Will. 4. c. lxvi))
Gloucestershire Roads Act 1756 (repealed)	29 Geo. 2. c. 51	9 March 1756
An Act for repairing and widening the several Roads from the Town of Tewkesbury to Coscomb Gate, and from Isabel's Elm to the Top of Gotherington Hill, in the County of Gloucester; and from Tewkesbury to a Farm House called The Old Blue Bell, and to the Direction Post in the Parish of Ripple, and to Simmond's Ford Brook, and from Breedon to Eckingtonbridge, in the County of Worcester; and from Tewkesbury to Wainloads Bridge, and to the Road opposite to Elstone Church, and from the Market House in Cheltenham to the Turnpike Road from Burford to Gloucester, near a Tree called Pewsdon Ash, in the said County of Gloucester. (Repealed by Statute Law (Repeals) Act 2013 (c. 2))
Poole Roads Act 1756 (repealed)	29 Geo. 2. c. 52	9 March 1756
An Act for repairing and widening several Roads leading from a Gate called Poole Gate, in the Town and County of Poole. (Repealed by Poole Roads Act 1777 (17 Geo. 3. c. 104))
Saint Marylebone Watch Act 1756 (repealed)	29 Geo. 2. c. 53	9 March 1756
An Act for the better regulating the Nightly Watch and Beadles, and cleansing, enlightening, and paving, the Streets, Squares, Lanes, and other Passages, and repairing the Highways and Causeways, and regulating the Poor, within the Parish of Saint Mary le Bone, in the County of Middlesex. (Repealed by Marylebone Improvement Act 1768 (8 Geo. 3. c. 46))
Wiltshire and Dorset Roads Act 1756 (repealed)	29 Geo. 2. c. 54	9 March 1756
An Act for repairing and widening the Road from the Top of Harnham Hill, near the City of New Sarum, in the County of Wilts, through the Towns of Blandford Forum and Dorchester, to a certain Intrenchment on Askerwell Hill in the County of Dorset. (Repealed by Harnham Hill, Blandford and Dorchester Road Act 1828 (9 Geo. 4. c. xxi))
Exeter Roads Act 1756 (repealed)	29 Geo. 2. c. 55	9 March 1756
An Act to amend and render more effectual an Act passed in the Twenty-sixth Year of the Reign of His present Majesty, (Note: Exeter Roads Act 1753 (26 Geo. 2. c. 74)) for amending several Roads leading from the City of Exeter. (Repealed by Exeter Roads, etc. Act 1773 (13 Geo. 3. c. 109))
Gloucester and Wiltshire Roads Act 1756 (repealed)	29 Geo. 2. c. 56	9 March 1756
An Act for amending and keeping in Repair the Roads leading from Mead Brook, which divides the Parishes of Pucklechurch and Mangotsfield, in the County of Gloucester, to Christian Malford Bridge in the County of Wilts, and also from Pucklechurch aforesaid to certain Coal Mines in the said Parish. (Repealed by Pucklechurch or Lower District of Roads Act 1831 (1 Will. 4. c. lxii) and Draycot or Upper District Turnpike Road (Wiltshire) Act 1831 (1 Will. 4. c. lxiii))
Maryport Harbour Act 1756 (repealed)	29 Geo. 2. c. 57	9 March 1756
An Act for enlarging the Term and Powers granted by an Act passed in the Twenty-second Year of His present Majesty, (Note: Maryport Harbour Act 1748 (22 Geo. 2. c. 6)) for repairing, enlarging, and preserving, the Harbour of Ellenfoot, in the County of Cumberland. (Repealed by Maryport Harbour and Improvement Act 1833 (3 & 4 Will. 4. c. cxiii))
Gloucester Roads Act 1756 (repealed)	29 Geo. 2. c. 58	15 April 1756
An Act for repairing and widening the Roads leading from the City of Gloucester towards Cheltenham and Tewkesbury, in the County of Gloucester. (Repealed by Statute Law (Repeals) Act 2013 (c. 2))
Ludlow Roads Act 1756 (repealed)	29 Geo. 2. c. 59	15 April 1756
An Act for amending, widening, and keeping in Repair, several Roads leading from the Markethouse and elsewhere in the Town of Ludlow, in the County of Salop. (Repealed by Ludlow Roads Act 1820 (1 Geo. 4. c. xxxiii))
Much Wenlock Roads Act 1756 (repealed)	29 Geo. 2. c. 60	15 April 1756
An Act for amending, widening, and keeping in Repair, several Roads, leading from the Markethouse in the Town of Much Wenlock, in the County of Salop. (Repealed by Much Wenlock and Gleeton Hill and Cressage Roads Act 1820 (60 Geo. 3 & 1 Geo. 4. c. vi) and Annual Turnpike Acts Continuance Act 1867 (30 & 31 Vict. c. 121))
Shropshire Roads Act 1756 (repealed)	29 Geo. 2. c. 61	15 April 1756
An Act for repairing and widening the Roads from Coleham Bridge in Shrewsbury, to the Market Place in Church Stretton, and to the Top of Lythwood Hill, and from Pulley Common to the May Pole in Condover, and from Coleham Bridge to Longdon, in the County of Salop. (Repealed by Shrewsbury and Church Stretton Roads Act 1821 (1 & 2 Geo. 4. c. ci), Church Stretton and Longden Roads (Salop.) Act 1842 (5 & 6 Vict. c. lxxii) and Annual Turnpike Acts Continuance Act 1874 (37 & 38 Vict. c. 95))
Saint Peter's Westminster Act 1756	29 Geo. 2. c. 62	15 April 1756
An Act to enable the Dean and Chapter of the Collegiate Church of Saint Peter at Westminster, and their Successors, to make and grant unto James Mallors a Lease or Leases of certain Pieces of Ground, Messuages, Tenements, and Hereditaments, comprized within certain Limits, for a longer Term of Years than they are at present enabled to grant.
Saint Mary Abbotts, Kensington (Poor Relief) Act 1756 (repealed)	29 Geo. 2. c. 63	15 April 1756
An Act to empower the Churchwardens, Overseers of the Poor, and Vestry, of the Parish of Kensington, in the County of Middlesex, to make a Rate or Rates for the Relief of the Poor, and the better repairing of the Highways, and cleansing the Streets, within the said Parish. (Repealed by Local Government Board's Provisional Order Confirmation (Poor Law) (No. 7) Act 1888 (51 & 52 Vict. c. xciv))
Shropshire Roads (No. 2) Act 1756 (repealed)	29 Geo. 2. c. 64	15 April 1756
An Act for repairing and widening the Roads from the Town of Shrewsbury, to Preston Brockhurst, to Shawbury, and to Shreyhill, in the County of Salop. (Repealed by Road from Shrewsbury to Preston Brockhurst Act 1819 (59 Geo. 3. c. lxxxvi))
Hereford Roads Act 1756 (repealed)	29 Geo. 2. c. 65	15 April 1756
An Act for repairing and widening the Roads leading from the Town of Kington in the County of Hereford, through The Welsh Hall Lane, as far as the same County extends, and the several Roads leading from Kington aforesaid, to Brilley's Mountain, to Eardisley, to Almely, to Eckley's Green, to Eardisland, to Staple Bar, and to Milton House, in the said County of Hereford. (Repealed by Kington Roads (Herefordshire) Act 1842 (5 & 6 Vict. c. lxxvii))
Hinckley and Coventry Road Act 1756 (repealed)	29 Geo. 2. c. 66	15 April 1756
An Act for explaining, amending, and rendering more effectual, an Act passed in the Twenty-seventh Year of His present Majesty, (Note: Leicester and Warwick Roads Act 1754 (27 Geo. 2. c. 42)) for repairing and widening the Road from Leicester to Narborough, and from Leicester to Coventry, and from thence through Kenilworth (Note: Kenilworth, Warwickshire. 52°21′00″N 1°34′52″W) to Warwick, (Note: Warwick, Warwickshire. 52°17′01″N 1°34′50″W) and from thence to Halford Bridge, (Note: Halford Bridge takes the A429 Fosse Way across the River Soar south of Halford, Warwickshire. 52°06′21″N 1°37′23″W) and from Warwick to Stratford upon Avon, and from Coventry to Martyn's Gutter (Note: Martyn's Gutter is a stream, also known as Mardon Sich, which formed the boundary between the parishes of Stivichall and Stoneleigh. 52°22′45″N 1°30′56″W) leading towards Stoneleigh Town; and for supplying an Omission in an Act passed in the last Session of Parliament, (Note: Leicester Roads Act 1753 (26 Geo. 2. c. 46)) for repairing the Road from Leicester to Ashby de la Zouch in the County of Leicester, so far as the same relates to that Part of the said Road which leads from the Town of Hinkley in the County of Leicester to the Town of Nuneaton, and from thence, through the Parishes of Chilvers, Coton, and Bedworth, to Bishop's Gate (Note: Bishop's Gate was located at the northern end of Bishop Street, at the junction with King Street. It was demolished in 1764. 52°24′44″N 1°30′43″W) in the City of Coventry. (Repealed by Hinckley, Nuneaton and Coventry Road Act 1825 (6 Geo. 4. c. x))
Wiltshire Road Act 1756	29 Geo. 2. c. 67	15 April 1756
An Act for enlarging the Terms and Powers granted by several Acts of Parliament, for repairing the Highways between Sheppard Shord and The Devizes, and from Stert Stone in the Parish of Urshfont to Rowd Ford in the County of Wilts; and for changing and altering Part of the said Highways; and for repairing the Road from the Top of Red Hone to Stert Stone aforesaid.
Denbigh Roads Act 1756 (repealed)	29 Geo. 2. c. 68	15 April 1756
An Act for amending, widening, and keeping in Repair, the several Roads from the Town of Pool in the County of Montgomery, to Wrexham in the County of Denbigh, and also the Road from Knockin in the County of Salop to Llanrbaiader in Mochnant in the County of Denbigh. (Repealed by Montgomery Salop and Denbigh Roads Act 1788 (28 Geo. 3. c. 96))
River Nene Navigation Act 1756 (repealed)	29 Geo. 2. c. 69	15 April 1756
An Act for the explaining, amending, and rendering more effectual, Two several Acts of Parliament; One of them, passed in the Thirteenth Year of Her late Majesty Queen Anne, (Note: River Nene (Northampton to Peterborough) Navigation Act 1713 (13 Ann. c. 19)) for making the River Nine, or Nen, running from Northampton to Peterborough, navigable; and the other, made in the Eleventh Year of His late Majesty King George the First, (Note: River Nene (Norfolk) Navigation Act 1724 (11 Geo. 1. c. 19)) for making more effectual the said former Act. (Repealed by Nene Valley Drainage and Navigation Improvement Act 1852 (15 & 16 Vict. c. cxxviii))
Durham Roads Act 1756 (repealed)	29 Geo. 2. c. 70	15 April 1756
An Act for enlarging the Term and Powers granted by an Act passed in the Twenty-fourth Year of His present Majesty's Reign, (Note: Durham Roads Act 1750 (24 Geo. 2. c. 30)) for repairing the High Road leading from Darlington in the County of Durham, to West Auckland, and several other Roads in the said County therein mentioned; and for the effectual amending the same. (Repealed by Durham Roads Act 1795 (35 Geo. 3. c. 139))
Yorkshire Roads Act 1756 (repealed)	29 Geo. 2. c. 71	15 April 1756
An Act to explain and amend an Act passed in the Twenty-fifth Year of the Reign of His present Majesty, intituled, "An Act for repairing the Roads from the Town of Leeds, through Harwood, to the South West Corner of the Enclosures of Harrogate, and from thence in Two Branches, one through Ripley over Burage Green, and the other through Knaresborough and Boroughbridge to Ripon, and from thence to the First Rill of Water or Water-course on Hutton Moor in the County of York; and for repairing the Sloughs and Ruts on the said Moor." (Note: Yorkshire Roads (No. 3) Act 1751 (25 Geo. 2. c. 58)) (Repealed by Road from Leeds to Harrogate Act 1839 (2 & 3 Vict. c. xxxii))
Truro Roads Act 1756 (repealed)	29 Geo. 2. c. 72	15 April 1756
An Act for changing and altering Two several Roads, directed to be amended and widened by an Act made in the Twenty-seventh Year of the Reign of His present Majesty, (Note: Truro Roads Act 1754 (27 Geo. 2. c. 41)) for amending and widening several Roads leading from the Borough of Truro in the County of Cornwall. (Repealed by Truro Roads Act 1773 (13 Geo. 3. c. 112))
Hay Bridge Over Wye Act 1756	29 Geo. 2. c. 73	15 April 1756
An Act for building a Bridge across the River Wye, from the Town of Hay in the County of Brecon, to the opposite Shore in the County of Radnor.
Edinburgh Water Act 1756 (repealed)	29 Geo. 2. c. 74	15 April 1756
An Act for the better supplying the City of Edinburgh with fresh and wholesome Water. (Repealed by Edinburgh Corporation Order Confirmation Act 1958 (7 & 8 Eliz. 2. c. v))
Isle of Portland Church Act 1756	29 Geo. 2. c. 75	15 April 1756
An Act for completing and finishing a new Church, and laying out and enclosing a Cemetery thereto, in the Island of Portland.
Northamptonshire and Lincoln Roads Act 1756 (repealed)	29 Geo. 2. c. 76	15 April 1756
An Act for enlarging and altering the Term and Powers granted by an Act made in the Twenty-second Year of His present Majesty's Reign, (Note: Northamptonshire Roads Act 1748 (22 Geo. 2. c. 17)) for effectually amending and repairing the Road leading from Wandsford Bridge in the County of Northampton, to the Town and Borough of Stamford in the County of Lincoln; and for repairing the Road from the Borough of Stamford to Stapleford Bridge in the Parish of Ryehall in the County of Rutland, and from thence to Bourne in the County of Lincoln. (Repealed by Wansford Bridge and Bourn Road Act 1820 (1 Geo. 4. c. xxii))
Berkshire Roads Act 1756 (repealed)	29 Geo. 2. c. 77	15 April 1756
An Act for repairing and widening the Road from the Town of Farringdon in the County of Berks, to the Town of Cricklade, and from thence to the Town of Malmsbury, in the County of Wilts, and the Road from thence to join the Turnpike Road at Acton Turville in the County of Gloucester, and also the Road from Tetbury in the said County, through Malmsbury aforesaid, to Chippenham Bridge, (Note: The town bridge in Chippenham, Wiltshire. 51°27′33″N 2°07′01″W) and the Road from Sherston to join the Turnpike Road leading from Tetbury to Bath. (Repealed by Roads from Tetbury, Malmesbury, Farringdon and Sherstone Act 1798 (38 Geo. 3. c. lxvi))
Shrewsbury Improvement Act 1756 (repealed)	29 Geo. 2. c. 78	15 April 1756
An Act for the better paving and amending, cleansing, enlightening, and watching, the Streets, Highways, Lanes, and Passages, within the Town of Shrewsbury, in the County of Salop. (Repealed by Shrewsbury Improvement Act 1821 (1 & 2 Geo. 4. c. lviii))
Carlford, Suffolk (Poor Relief) Act 1756 (repealed)	29 Geo. 2. c. 79	15 April 1756
An Act for the better Relief and Employment of the Poor, in the Hundreds of Colneis and Carlford, in the County of Suffolk. (Repealed by Colneis and Carlford Hundreds, Suffolk Poor Relief Act 1790 (30 Geo. 3. c. 22))
Yorkshire and Durham Roads Act 1756 (repealed)	29 Geo. 2. c. 80	15 April 1756
An Act for enlarging the Term and Powers granted by an Act passed in the Twenty-first Year of the Reign of His present Majesty, (Note: Durham Roads Act 1747 (21 Geo. 2. c. 5)) for repairing the High Road from the Town of Bowes in the County of York, to Barnard Castle in the County of Durham, and from thence through Staindrop to Newgate in Bishop Auckland, and from Newgate along Gibb Chair to Gaundless Bridge, and from thence by Melderston Gill to the Turnpike Road near Sunderland Bridge in the County of Durham; and for making the same more effectual. (Repealed by Yorkshire and Durham Roads Act 1792 (32 Geo. 3. c. 135))
Berkshire Roads (No. 2) Act 1756 (repealed)	29 Geo. 2. c. 81	15 April 1756
An Act for amending and keeping in Repair the Roads leading from a Place called Fryer Bacon's Study to Chilton Pond, and from the Top of Hincksey Hill to Foxcombe Hill Gate, in the Road leading to Farringdon in the County of Berks. (Repealed by Abingdon and Chilton Pond Road Act 1841 (4 & 5 Vict. c. cxi) and Statute Law (Repeals) Act 2013 (c. 2))
Derby and Sheffield Roads Act 1756 (repealed)	29 Geo. 2. c. 82	15 April 1756
An Act for repairing and widening the Road from the White Stoop near the North End of the Town of Derby, through the Towns of Duffield and Chesterfield in the County of Derby, to the Town of Sheffield in the County of York, and from the said Town of Duffield to The Moot Hall in the Town of Wirksworth in the said County of Derby. (Repealed by Derby, Duffield, Wirksworth and Sheffield Turnpike Road Act 1851 (14 & 15 Vict. c. xxxvii))
Ripon and Pateley Bridge Road Act 1756 (repealed)	29 Geo. 2. c. 83	15 April 1756
An Act for repairing and widening the High Road from the Borough of Ripon, by Ingram Bank, to the Town of Pately Bridge, in the County of York. (Repealed by Ripon and Pateley Bridge Road Act 1821 (1 & 2 Geo. 4. c. xi) and Annual Turnpike Acts Continuance Act 1871 (34 & 35 Vict. c. 115))
Lincoln Roads Act 1756 (repealed)	29 Geo. 2. c. 84	15 April 1756
An Act for repairing and widening the Roads from the North End of Dunsby Lane to the South West Corner of Riseholm Hedge, and to Carholm Gate, Drinsey Nooke, and Dunham and Littleburgh Ferries, and from the North End of Waddington Field, and the Bridge over the River Witham at Bracebridge, to the City of Lincoln, and from the Gate at the Foot of Canwicke Hill to the Great Bar Gates of the said City; and for enforcing the Performance of Statute Work upon the Highways communicating with the said Roads, to a certain Distance from the said Roads. (Repealed by Lincoln Roads Act 1841 (4 & 5 Vict. c. cviii))
Lincoln and Peterborough Roads Act 1756 (repealed)	29 Geo. 2. c. 85	15 April 1756
An Act for repairing and widening the Roads leading from the East Side of Lincoln Heath to the City of Peterborough, and from the East End of Marham Lane to the Town of Walton, in the County of Northampton, and from the Town of Bourne to the Town of Colsterworth, and from Donington High Bridge to the Cross Post in the Parish of Hacconby, and from the East End of a Lane called Hale Drove, to and through the Town of Old Sleaford, to the End of Long Hedge in the Parish of Quarrington in the County of Lincoln. (Repealed by Lincoln Heath and Peterborough and Bourn and Spalding Roads Act 1822 (3 Geo. 4. c. lxvi))
Blackfriars Bridge Act 1756	29 Geo. 2. c. 86	27 May 1756
An Act for building a Bridge cross the River Thames, from Blackfryars in the City of London, to the opposite Side in the County of Surry.
Tower of London Act 1756 (repealed)	29 Geo. 2. c. 87	27 May 1756
An Act for regulating the Nightly Watch and Beadles, and better enlightening, paving, and cleansing, the Streets and other Passages, and repairing the Highways, within the Parishes of Saint John Wapping, Saint Paul Shadwell, the Hamlet of Ratcliffe, the Parish of Saint Ann in the County of Middlesex, and the Precinct of Well Close in the Liberty of The Tower of London. (Repealed by St. Paul Shadwell Poor Relief and Improvement Act 1810 (50 Geo. 3. c. ccviii))
Highgate and Hampstead Roads Act 1756 (repealed)	29 Geo. 2. c. 88	27 May 1756
An Act to enable the respective Trustees of the Turnpike Roads leading to Highgate Gatehouse and Hampstead, and from Saint Giles's Pound (Note: St Giles's Pound, at the corner of Oxford Street and Tottenham Court Road.) to Kilbourn Bridge, (Note: Kilburn Bridge was located where the Edgware Road (Kilburn High Road) crossed the River Westbourne. The river is now culverted. 51°32′08″N 0°11′25″W) in the County of Middlesex, to make a new Road, from the Great Northern Road at Islington, to the Edgeware Road near Paddington, and also from the North End of Portland Street, cross the Farthing Pye-house Fields, into the said new Road; and for enlarging the Terms and Powers granted by Two several Acts, for repairing the said Road from Saint Giles's Pound to Kilbourn Bridge. (Repealed by St. Pancras Improvement Act 1812 (52 Geo. 3. c. lxxiv) and Roads to Highgate House and Hampstead Act 1821 (1 & 2 Geo. 4. c. cx))
Church of Saint John, Wapping Act 1756	29 Geo. 2. c. 89	27 May 1756
An Act for re-building the Parish Church, and enlarging the Church-yard, of Saint John of Wapping, in the County of Middlesex.
York Buildings (Rates) Act 1756 (repealed)	29 Geo. 2. c. 90	27 May 1756
An Act to enable the Proprietors and Inhabitants of Houses in York Buildings, in the Parish of Saint Martin in the Fields, in the County of Middlesex, to make and levy a Rate on themselves, sufficient to answer the Expense of re-building or repairing of the Terrace-walk and Water-gate, and such other Part of the Premises adjoining to the River Thames, and belonging to the said Buildings, as shall be judged necessary; and for keeping the same in Repair for the future. (Repealed by Statute Law Revision Act 1948 (11 & 12 Geo. 6. c. 62))
Richmond to Lancaster Road Act 1756 (repealed)	29 Geo. 2. c. 91	27 May 1756
An Act for explaining and making more effectual an Act, passed in the Twenty-fourth Year of the Reign of His present Majesty, (Note: Richmond and Lancaster Road Act 1750 (24 Geo. 2. c. 17)) for repairing the Road leading from the East End of Brumpton High Lane in the County of York to the Town of Richmond, and from thence to and through the Towns of Aiskrigg and Ingleton in the said County, to the Town of Lancaster in the County of Lancaster; and also for repairing the Road leading from Richmond aforesaid, through Gilling, Melsonby, and Aldbrough, to Lucy otherwise Lousy Cross, and from Gilling, through Gilling Town Lane, to the Turnpike Road on Gatherly Moor. (Repealed by Richmond (Yorkshire), Lancaster, Lucy Cross and Gatherley Moor Roads Act 1817 (57 Geo. 3. c. xxvii))
Wiltshire, Dorset and Somerset Roads Act 1756 (repealed)	29 Geo. 2. c. 92	27 May 1756
An Act for explaining, amending, and making more effectual, an Act of Parliament made in the Twenty-sixth Year of the Reign of His present Majesty, intituled, "An Act for repairing and widening the Road from the Top of White Sheet Hill in the Parish of Donehead Saint Andrew in the County of Wilts, through the Towns of Shaftesbury, Milbourne Port, and Sherborne, in the Counties of Dorset and Somerset, to The Half-way House in the Parish of Nether otherwise Lower Compton, in the said County of Dorset, and several other Roads near the Towns of Shaftesbury and Sherborne aforesaid;" (Note: Wiltshire, Dorset and Somerset Roads Act 1753 (26 Geo. 2. c. 60)) and for repairing other Roads, adjoining to the Roads in the said former Act mentioned. (Repealed by %[%[Donhead St. Andrew and Nether Compton Road (Wiltshire) Act 1801]] ([[41 Geo. 3 (U.K.)41 Geo. 3%]%]. c. xxxviii))
Shrewsbury and Wrexham Road Act 1756 (repealed)	29 Geo. 2. c. 93	27 May 1756
An Act to enlarge the Term and Powers of an Act (Note: Shrewsbury and Wrexham Road Act 1751 (25 Geo. 2. c. 22)) for repairing the Road from Shrewsbury to Wrexham in the County of Denbigh; and to repair and widen several other Roads therein mentioned, and the Road from Wrexham to Chester, and from thence to Pen Fordd y Waen in the Parish of Whitford, and also the Road from Broughton to Mold, in the County of Flint. (Repealed by Shrewsbury to Wrexham Road Act 1813 (53 Geo. 3. c. cxxxii), Broughton and Mold Roads Act 1822 (3 Geo. 4. c. l), Road from Chester to Wrexham Act 1828 (9 Geo. 4. c. lxxvii) and Shrewsbury, Ellesmere and Wrexham Road Act 1838 (1 & 2 Vict. c. xvii))
Presteigne Road Act 1756 (repealed)	29 Geo. 2. c. 94	27 May 1756
An Act for amending, repairing, and widening, the Roads leading from The Ryeway in the Parish of Yarpole in the County of Hereford, to Presteigne in the County of Radnor, and from thence to Leintwardine, and from Presteigne aforesaid to the Top of Trap Hill, and from The Ryeway aforesaid, by The Maidenhead, to Wooferton in the County of Salop. (Repealed by Ryeway and Presteigne Roads Act 1822 (3 Geo. 4. c. xvi), South Wales Turnpike Trusts Act 1844 (7 & 8 Vict. c. 91) and Annual Turnpike Acts Continuance Act 1877 (40 & 41 Vict. c. 64))

=== Private acts ===
Short title	Citation	Royal assent
Long title
Fatio's Naturalization Act 1756	29 Geo. 2. c. 1 Pr.	23 December 1755
An Act for naturalizing John David Fatio.
Pedersen's Naturalization Act 1756	29 Geo. 2. c. 2 Pr.	23 December 1755
An Act for naturalizing Jens Pedersen.
Earl of Lincoln's Estate Act 1756	29 Geo. 2. c. 3 Pr.	9 March 1756
An Act for the Sale of several Lands in Bedford Level, the Estate of the Right Honourable Henry Earl of Lincoln Knight of the most Noble Order of the Garter and Katherine Countess of Lincoln his Wife; and for purchasing other Lands and Hereditaments, of as great or greater Value; and settling the said Lands so to be purchased to the same Uses as the said Lands to be sold are now settled; and for other Purposes therein mentioned.
Woollaston's Estate Act 1756	29 Geo. 2. c. 4 Pr.	9 March 1756
An Act for explaining and amending an Act made in the Twenty-seventh Year of His present Majesty's Reign, intituled, "An Act for vesting certain Estates of Sir Isaac Lawrence Woollaston Baronet, an Infant, situate in the Isle of Ely and Counties of Cambridge, Huntingdon, Lincoln, and Norfolk, in Trustees, to be sold or mortgaged, to raise Money for Payment of his Sisters Portions; and for other Purposes therein mentioned." (Note: Woollaston's Estate Act 1754 (27 Geo. 2. c. 28 Pr.))
Hanmer's Estate Act 1756	29 Geo. 2. c. 5 Pr.	9 March 1756
An Act for empowering Esther Hammer, an Infant, to settle her Estates, pursuant to Articles entered into in Consideration of a Marriage agreed upon between Asheton Curzon Esquire and the said Esther Hammer.
Walker's Estate Act 1756	29 Geo. 2. c. 6 Pr.	9 March 1756
An Act for vesting divers Lands and Hereditaments, in the Counties of Bucks and Berks, late the Estate of Thomas Walker Clerk, deceased, in Thomas Walker the Grandson, in Fee Simple, subject to the raising Portions for his Younger Brother and Sisters.
Radway Inclosure Act 1756	29 Geo. 2. c. 7 Pr.	9 March 1756
An Act for dividing and enclosing a certain Open and Common Field, called Radway Field, within the Township of Radway, in the County of Warwick.
Brancepeth Inclosure Act 1756	29 Geo. 2. c. 8 Pr.	9 March 1756
An Act for dividing and enclosing certain Wastes, or Common Grounds, in the Parish of Brancepeth, in the County of Durham.
Boughton and Pisford Inclosure Act 1756 (repealed)	29 Geo. 2. c. 9 Pr.	9 March 1756
An Act for dividing and enclosing the Common Fields, Common Pastures, Common Meadows, Common Grounds, and Waste Grounds, in the several Parishes of Boughton and Pisford, in the County of Northampton. (Repealed by Northampton Act 1988 (c. xxix))
Sutton upon the Forest (Yorkshire) inclosure and compensation to impropriator of rectory and vicar of Sutton in lieu of tithes.	29 Geo. 2. c. 10 Pr.	9 March 1756
An Act for dividing and enclosing several Fields, Meadows, and Commons, in the Township of Sutton upon the Forest, in the County of York; and for giving Compensations, in Lieu of Tithes, to the Impropriator of the Rectory, and the Vicar of Sutton aforesaid.
Mynors' Name Act 1756	29 Geo. 2. c. 11 Pr.	9 March 1756
An Act to enable Robert Mynors and his First and other Sons, and their Heirs Male, to take and use the Surname of Gouge, in pursuance of the Will of Nicholas Gouge, deceased.
Wiggett's Name Act 1756	29 Geo. 2. c. 12 Pr.	9 March 1756
An Act to enable William Wiggett Esquire, now called William Bulwer, and his Heirs, to take and use the Surname and Arms of Bulwer, pursuant to the Will of William Bulwer Esquire deceased.
Naturalization of Anthony Stemann, Peter Otte, Godfrey Molling, Christian Meyer, Henry Bielfield, John Blaquier and Matthew Lichigaray.	29 Geo. 2. c. 13 Pr.	9 March 1756
An Act for naturalizing Anthony Henry Stemann, Peter Otte, Godfrey Molling, Christian Meyer, Henry Bielfeld, John Peter Blaquiere, and Mathew Lichigaray.
Esternod's Naturalization Act 1756	29 Geo. 2. c. 14 Pr.	9 March 1756
An Act for naturalizing Jost David Esternod.
Duke of Marlborough's Estate Act 1756	29 Geo. 2. c. 15 Pr.	15 April 1756
An Act for providing a Maintenance for the Marquis of Blandford, during the Life of his Father the Duke of Marlborough; and for re-building the said Duke's House at Langley, in the County of Bucks; and for purchasing and making void divers Leases granted by the said Duke, in Trust for his Younger Children; and for other Purposes therein mentioned.
Enabling John Earl of Sandwich, George Earl of Cholmondeley and Wellbore Ellis to take in Great Britain the oath as Vice Treasurer and Receiver General, and Paymaster General of His Majesty's revenues in Ireland, and to qualify themselves for the enjoyment of the said offices.	29 Geo. 2. c. 16 Pr.	15 April 1756
An Act to enable John Earl of Sandwich, George Earl of Cholmondeley, and Wellbore Ellis Esquire, to take, in Great Britain, the Oath of Office, as Vice Treasurer and Receiver General and Paymaster General of all His Majesty's Revenues in the Kingdom of Ireland; and to qualify themselves for the Enjoyment of the said Offices.
Making exemplification of Earl of Burlington Cork's will evidence in all British and Irish courts.	29 Geo. 2. c. 17 Pr.	15 April 1756
An Act for making the Exemplification of the last Will of the Right Honourable Richard late Earl of Burlington and Corke, deceased, Evidence in all Courts of Law and Equity in Great Britain and Ireland.
Lord Vere's Estate Act 1756	29 Geo. 2. c. 18 Pr.	15 April 1756
An Act for vesting the Capital Messuage of Halsted, and divers Lands in Kent, Part of the settled Estate of Vere Lord Vere, in Trustees, to be conveyed to Robert Bagshaw Esquire, the Purchaser thereof, pursuant to Articles; and for settling another Estate, in the County of Middlesex, of greater Value, in Lieu thereof.
Lane's Estate Act 1756	29 Geo. 2. c. 19 Pr.	15 April 1756
An Act for raising Money, out of the Estates of Ralph Lane Esquire, deceased, in the Counties of Northampton and Cambridge, for discharging the Encumbrances affecting the same; and for applying Part of the Personal Estate of Elizabeth Lane his Wife, deceased, in the Purchase of the Cambridgeshire Estate, to be settled pursuant to her Will.
For vesting certain adjudications now vested in the Crown by the conviction or attainder of Alexander Mackenzie, in Hugh McLeod.	29 Geo. 2. c. 20 Pr.	15 April 1756
An Act for vesting certain Adjudications, now vested in the Crown by the Conviction or Attainder of Alexander Mackenzie of Fraserdale, in Hugh Macleod of Genics Esquire.
Parson's Estate Act 1756	29 Geo. 2. c. 21 Pr.	15 April 1756
An Act for vesting Part of the settled Estate of Thomas Parson Gentleman and Honour his Wife in Trustees, to be sold, for raising Portions for Younger Children; and for laying out the Surplus, if any, in the Purchase of other Lands, to be settled to the Uses of their Marriage Settlement.
Skrine's Estate Act 1756	29 Geo. 2. c. 22 Pr.	15 April 1756
An Act for vesting in Trustees certain Messuages, Lands, Tenements, and Farms, in the County of Surry, settled upon the Marriage of Richard Dickson Skrine Esquire with Elizabeth his now Wife, to be sold and conveyed pursuant to Articles; and for laying out the Purchase-money in other Lands and Tenements, to be settled to the Uses of their Marriage Settlement.
Broadhead's Estate Act 1756	29 Geo. 2. c. 23 Pr.	15 April 1756
An Act to enable Theodore Henry Broadhead, an Infant, to make Leases of the Estates given and devised to him by the Will of his Uncle Henry Broadhead Esquire, deceased.
Roper's Estate Act 1756	29 Geo. 2. c. 24 Pr.	15 April 1756
An Act for vesting the Estate of Trevor Charles Roper and Henry Roper, who are both Infants, in the County of Kent, in Trustees, to be sold; and for applying the Purchase-money for discharging Encumbrances affecting the same, under the Directions of the Court of Chancery.
Baugh's Estate Act 1756	29 Geo. 2. c. 25 Pr.	15 April 1756
An Act for selling the settled Estate of Thomas Folliot Baugh Esquire, in the County of Hereford; and for settling another Estate, of greater Value, to the Uses of his Grandfather's Will and his own Marriage Settlement respectively.
Katherine Hall Estate Act 1756	29 Geo. 2. c. 26 Pr.	15 April 1756
An Act for enabling the Master and Fellows of Katherine Hall, in the University of Cambridge, to purchase, settle, and dispose of, Tenements and Grounds, for the making and erecting an additional Building to their College, or Hall, for the Reception and Maintenance of Six Fellows and Ten Scholars, founded by the Will of Mary Ramsden, deceased; and for empowering any Corporation within the said University to sell and convey other Lands and Tenements, for that and other Purposes in the said Act mentioned.
Coryton's Estate Act 1756	29 Geo. 2. c. 27 Pr.	15 April 1756
An Act for enabling Ann Coryton, Elizabeth Goodall, and William Goodall, to make Leases of several Estates in the Counties of Cornwall and Devon, during the Minorities of John Coryton and others, the Infant Children of Peter Coryton Esquire, deceased.
Talbot's Estate Act 1756	29 Geo. 2. c. 28 Pr.	15 April 1756
An Act for vesting Part of the Estate of John Talbot the Younger Esquire, settled upon his Marriage, in Trustees, for raising a Sum of Money for discharging Debts and Encumbrances.
Exchange of lands in Steeple Aston (Oxfordshire) pursuant to an agreement between Brasenose College, John Eaton and Francis Page and also to give said Francis Page and others claiming under Sir Francis Page's will, power to make a jointure on any future wife.	29 Geo. 2. c. 29 Pr.	15 April 1756
An Act for confirming and establishing an Exchange of Tithes, Cottages, and Lands, for a Messuage, Farms, Lands, and Common of Pasture, in Steeple Aston, in the County of Oxford, pursuant to an Agreement between the Principal and Scholars of King's Hall and College of Brazen Nose in Oxford, John Eaton Clerk, and Francis Page Esquire; and also for giving Power to the said Francis Page and others, claiming under the Will of Sir Francis Page Knight; deceased, to make a Jointure on any Wife or Wives with whom they may intermarry.
Fleetwood's Estate Act 1756	29 Geo. 2. c. 30 Pr.	15 April 1756
An Act for Sale of the Manor and Capital Messuage of Tadworth, and divers Lands, Tenements, and Hereditaments, in the County of Surry, late the Estate of John Fleetwood Esquire, deceased; and purchasing another Estate; to be settled to the Uses in his Will.
Francke's Estate Act 1756	29 Geo. 2. c. 31 Pr.	15 April 1756
An Act for vesting the Estates of Evelyn Charles Francke and Edward Francke Esquires, in the County of Lancaster, in Trustees, to be sold, for discharging a Mortgage affecting the same; and for laying out the Surplus of the Money arising by such Sale in the Purchase of other Lands and Hereditaments, to be settled pursuant to the Wills of the said Evelyn Charles Francke and Edward Francke respectively.
Aubrey's Estate Act 1756	29 Geo. 2. c. 32 Pr.	15 April 1756
An Act for vesting the Estates of Richard Gough Awbrey Esquire, in the Counties of Brecon, Glamorgan, and Carmarthen, in Trustees, to raise Money to discharge several Encumbrances affecting the same; and for other Purposes therein mentioned.
Gregor's Estate Act 1756	29 Geo. 2. c. 33 Pr.	15 April 1756
An Act to empower Sir John Molesworth Baronet and Joseph Moyle Esquire, Two of the surviving Trustees in an Indenture dated the Twenty-fifth Day of December One Thousand Seven Hundred and Forty-three, to raise the several Sums in the said Indenture mentioned, or such of them as are still unsatisfied; and pay the same, as well as the rest of the Personal Estate of Hugh Gregor, deceased, to such Persons as Jane Gregor, and Infant, shall marry during her Infancy, with the Consent of the said surviving Trustees and of her Guardians.
Glover's Divorce Act 1756	29 Geo. 2. c. 34 Pr.	15 April 1756
An Act to dissolve the Marriage of Richard Glover with Hannah Nunn his now Wife; and to enable him to marry again; and for other Purposes therein mentioned.
Warthill (Yorkshire) inclosure and Holtby and Warthill tithes.	29 Geo. 2. c. 35 Pr.	15 April 1756
An Act for dividing and enclosing the undivided Parts of the several Common Fields in the Township of Warthill, in the County of York; and for giving Compensations to the Rector of Holtby in the same County, and the Vicar of Warthill aforesaid, in Lieu of Tithes and certain Ecclesiastical Dues.
Sow Inclosure Act 1756	29 Geo. 2. c. 36 Pr.	15 April 1756
An Act for enclosing and dividing the Common Fields, Common Pastures, Waste Grounds, and Commonable Lands, in the Manors and Parish of Sow in the County of Warwick, and County of the City of Coventry.
Ellell Inclosure Act 1756	29 Geo. 2. c. 37 Pr.	15 April 1756
An Act for enclosing divers Parcels of Waste Grounds, or Commons, in Ellell, in the County of Lancaster.
Tinwell Fields Inclosure Act 1756	29 Geo. 2. c. 38 Pr.	15 April 1756
An Act for enclosing and dividing Tinwell Fields, in the County of Rutland; and for settling a Stipend on the Rector, in Lieu of Glebe and Tithes.
Weston cum Membris and Sawley Inclosure Act 1756	29 Geo. 2. c. 39 Pr.	15 April 1756
An Act for dividing and enclosing a Common, or Moor, called Aston and Shardlow Moor, and several Common Fields, Meadows, Pastures, and Waste Grounds, lying within the Manor of Weston cum Membris, and Prebend of Sawley, in the County of Derby.
Clifton upon Dunsmore Inclosure Act 1756	29 Geo. 2. c. 40 Pr.	15 April 1756
An Act for dividing and enclosing the Common Fields, Common Pastures, Common Meadows, and Common Grounds, in Newton, in the Parish of Clifton upon Dunsmore, in the County of Warwick.
Riley's Name Act 1756	29 Geo. 2. c. 41 Pr.	15 April 1756
An Act for authorizing and empowering John Riley and his Issue to take and use the Surname of Wheelwright, instead of the Surname of Riley.
Leigh's Name Act 1756	29 Geo. 2. c. 42 Pr.	15 April 1756
An Act to enable James Leigh Esquire, now called James Perrot, and his Heirs, to take and use the Surname and Arms of Perrot, pursuant to the Will of Thomas Perrot Esquire, deceased.
Bonnet's Naturalization Act 1756	29 Geo. 2. c. 43 Pr.	15 April 1756
An Act for naturalizing Peter Bonnet.
Paul's Naturalization Act 1756	29 Geo. 2. c. 44 Pr.	15 April 1756
An Act for naturalizing John Daniel Paul.
Earl of Peterborough and Monmouth's Estate Act 1756	29 Geo. 2. c. 45 Pr.	27 May 1756
An Act for vesting the Manor of Dantsey and Hundred of Chippenham, and divers Messuages, Lands, Tenements, and Hereditaments, in the County of Wilts, late the Estates of Charles Earl of Peterborow and Monmouth, deceased, in Trustees, for raising a certain Sum of Money, for the Purposes therein mentioned.
Lord Cranstoun's Estate Act 1756	29 Geo. 2. c. 46 Pr.	27 May 1756
An Act for Sale of the Estate of James Lord Cranstoun, in the County of Northumberland, settled on his Marriage for the Benefit of Sophia Lady Cranstoun and their Issue, for raising Money, to discharge the Encumbrances affecting the same; and also towards disencumbering his Estate in Scotland, settled also for the Benefit of the said Lady Cranstoun and the Issue of that Marriage.
Executing contracts made by James Lord Blukeley in Ireland, in his lifetime, for sale of lands and tenements in Cheshire for payment of incumbrances.	29 Geo. 2. c. 47 Pr.	27 May 1756
An Act for carrying into Execution several Contracts, made by or on the Behalf of James late Lord Bulkeley in the Kingdom of Ireland, in his Lifetime, for the Sale of several Lands and Tenements in the County of Chester; and for applying the Purchase-money to discharge Encumbrances affecting the same.
Williams' Estate Act 1756	29 Geo. 2. c. 48 Pr.	27 May 1756
An Act for vesting the Manor of Northall, and divers Lands and Hereditaments, in the County of Middlesex, settled on the Marriage of Sir Hutchins Williams Baronet, and devised by the Will of William Peere Williams his Father, respectively, in Trustees, in order to be conveyed to Agatha Child Widow and her Heirs, pursuant to Articles of Agreement for that Purpose; and for laying out the Money arising by Sale of the Estate devised by the said Will in the Purchase of Lands, to be settled to the Uses of that Will; and for other Purposes therein mentioned.
Delaval's Estate Act 1756	29 Geo. 2. c. 49 Pr.	27 May 1756
An Act for vesting divers Manors, Lands, and Hereditaments, Part of the settled Estates of Francis Blake Delaval Esquire, in Trustees, for raising Money, to pay off and discharge several Debts and Encumbrances; and for other Purposes therein mentioned.
Mundy's Estate Act 1756	29 Geo. 2. c. 50 Pr.	27 May 1756
An Act for Sale of the settled Estate of Wrightson Mundy Esquire, in the County of Leicester, for discharging Encumbrances affecting the same, and also his unsettled Estate in the County of Derby; and for settling the Derbyshire Estate, so disencumbered, to the Uses therein mentioned.
Confirmation of a partition between John Leman and Elizabeth and John Newnham of estates in London, Middlesex and Huntingdonshire.	29 Geo. 2. c. 51 Pr.	27 May 1756
An Act for confirming a Partition between John Leman Esquire and Elizabeth Newnham and John Newnham Esquire, of several Estates in the City of London, and Counties of Middlesex and Huntingdon; and for vesting and settling the entire Premises, which, on such Partition, were allotted to the said John Leman and Elizabeth Newham and John Newnham, respectively, to the Uses therein mentioned.
Egleton Inclosure Act 1756	29 Geo. 2. c. 52 Pr.	27 May 1756
An Act for dividing the Common Fields of Egleton, alias Edgeton, in the County of Rutland.
Thornhaugh's Name Act 1756	29 Geo. 2. c. 53 Pr.	27 May 1756
An Act to enable John Thornaugh Esquire, now called John Hewett, and his Descendants, to take and use the Surname of Hewett, pursuant to the Will of Sir Thomas Hewett Knight, deceased.
Jabert's Naturalization Act 1756	29 Geo. 2. c. 54 Pr.	27 May 1756
An Act for naturalizing Francis Jalabert, an Infant under the Age of Eighteen Years.

=== Sources ===
- Pickering, Danby, ed. (1766). The Statutes at Large. Vol. 21: From the 26th to the 30th Year of King George II. Cambridge: Joseph Bentham. pp. 317–548 – via Internet Archive.
- Pickering, Danby, ed. (1766). The Statutes at Large. Vol. 21: From the 26th to the 30th Year of King George II. Cambridge: Joseph Bentham. pp. 317–548 – via Google Books.
- Pickering, Danby, ed. (1766). The Statutes at Large. Vol. 21: From the 26th to the 30th Year of King George II. Cambridge: Joseph Bentham – via Internet Archive.
- Journals of the House of Commons. Vol. 27. London: His Majesty's Stationery Office. 1803. pp. 297–620 – via Google Books.
- Chronological Table of and Index to the Statutes. Vol. 1: To the End of the Session 59 Vict. Sess. 2 (1895) (13th ed.). London: Her Majesty's Stationery Office. 1896. pp. 116–117 – via Google Books.

== See also ==
- List of acts of the Parliament of Great Britain
