= Continuance of Laws Act 1756 =

Act of the Parliament of Great Britain

- Act of Parliament
- Parliament of Great Britain
- Long title: An Act for reviving and continuing an Act for the Relief of Debtors, with respect to the Imprisonment of their Persons; and for continuing an Act, made in the last Session of Parliament, to continue several Laws relating to the Distemper now raging among the Horned Cattle in this Kingdom.
- Citation: 29 Geo. 2. c. 28
- Territorial extent: Great Britain

Dates
- Royal assent: 27 May 1756
- Commencement: 13 November 1755 (Note: Start of session.)
- Repealed: 15 July 1867
Other legislation
| Amends | See § Revived and continued enactments |
| Repealed by | Statute Law Revision Act 1867 |
| Relates to | See Expiring laws continuance acts |

Status: Repealed

Text of statute as originally enacted

The Continuance of Laws Act 1756 (29 Geo. 2. c. 28) was an act of the Parliament of Great Britain that revived and continued various older acts.

== Background ==
In the United Kingdom, acts of Parliament remain in force until expressly repealed. Many acts of parliament, however, contained time-limited sunset clauses, requiring legislation to revive enactments that had expired or to continue enactments that would otherwise expire.

== Provisions ==
=== Revived and continued enactments ===
Section 1 of the act revived and continued the Insolvent Debtors Relief (No. 2) Act 1728 (2 Geo. 2. c. 22), as amended by the Insolvent Debtors Relief Act 1729 (3 Geo. 2. c. 27) and amended and continued by the Set-off Act 1734 (8 Geo. 2. c. 24), as continued by the Continuance of Laws Act 1740 (14 Geo. 2. c. 34) and as continued by the Insolvent Debtors Relief, etc. Act 1747 (21 Geo. 2. c. 33), until 1 June 1759.

Section 2 of the act continued the Distemper Amongst Cattle Act 1755 (28 Geo. 2. c. 18) from the expiration of the act until the end of the next session of parliament after 29 September 1756.

== Subsequent developments ==
The Select Committee on Temporary Laws, Expired or Expiring, appointed in 1796, inspected and considered all temporary laws, observing irregularities in the construction of expiring laws continuance acts, making recommendations and emphasising the importance of the Committee for Expired and Expiring Laws.

The whole act was repealed by section 1 of, and the schedule to, the Statute Law Revision Act 1867 (30 & 31 Vict. c. 59), which came into force on 15 July 1867.
