= Continuance of Laws, etc. Act 1748 =

Act of the Parliament of Great Britain

- Act of Parliament
- Parliament of Great Britain
- Long title: An Act to continue several Laws, for preventing Exactions of the Occupiers of Locks and Wears upon the River Thames Westward, and for ascertaining the Rates of Water Carriage upon the said River, and for continuing, explaining, and amending, the several Laws for the better Regulation of Attornies and Solicitors, and for regulating the Price and Assize of Bread, and for preventing the spreading of the Distemper amongst the Horned Cattle, and also for making further Regulations with respect to Attornies and Solicitors, and for further preventing the spreading of the Distemper amongst the Horned Cattle, and for the more frequent Return of Writs in the Counties Palatine of Chester and Lancaster, and for ascertaining the Method of levying Writs of Execution against the Inhabitants of Hundreds, and for allowing Quakers to make Affirmation, in Cases where an Oath is or shall be required.
- Citation: 22 Geo. 2. c. 46
- Territorial extent: Great Britain

Dates
- Royal assent: 13 June 1749
- Commencement: 29 November 1748 (Note: Start of session.)
- Repealed: 21 August 1871
Other legislation
Amends	See § Continued Enactments
Amended by	Cattle Distemper, Vagrancy, Marshalsea Prison, etc. Act 1753; Solicitors Act 1843
Repealed by	Statute Law Revision Act 1871
Relates to	See Expiring laws continuance acts

Status: Repealed

Text of statute as originally enacted

The Continuance of Laws, etc. Act 1748 (22 Geo. 2. c. 46) was an act of the Parliament of Great Britain that continued various older acts.

== Background ==
In the United Kingdom, acts of Parliament remain in force until expressly repealed. Many acts of parliament, however, contained time-limited sunset clauses, requiring legislation to revive enactments that had expired or to continue enactments that would otherwise expire.

== Provisions ==
Section 1 of the act continued the Thames Navigation Act 1729 (3 Geo. 2 c. 11), as continued by the Continuance of Laws Act 1746 (20 Geo. 2. c. 47), from the expiration of the act until 1 June 1750.

Section 2 of the act continued the Attorneys and Solicitors Act 1728 (2 Geo. 2. c. 23) from the expiration of the act until the end of the next session of parliament after 24 June 1757.

Section 3 of the act provided that after 1 July 1, anyone bound by written contract to serve as a clerk to an attorney or solicitor must file a sworn affidavit within three months documenting the contract's execution, including names and addresses of all parties and the date, with the court where the attorney or solicitor is enrolled.

Section 4 of the act provided that after 1 July 1749, no person bound as a clerk to an attorney or solicitor would be admitted or enrolled as an attorney or solicitor in any court unless their proper affidavit, marked by the appropriate officer, was produced and openly read in court at the time of admission.

Section 5 of the act provided that specific officers were designated for filing clerk affidavits in each court: the Senior Clerk of the Petty Bag Office in Chancery, the Chief Clerk in King's Bench, the Clerk of Warrants in Common Pleas, the King's Remembrancer in Exchequer, the Chief Clerk in Duchy Chamber of Lancaster, the Prothonotaries in Counties Palatine, and the Prothonotaries in Welsh Courts of Great Sessions.

Section 6 of the act provided that court officers filing clerk affidavits must maintain a book recording the substance of each affidavit, including names and addresses of the attorney, solicitor, clerk, and affidavit maker, along with contract dates and filing dates, charging two shillings and six pence per filing, with these records available for public inspection without additional fees.

Section 7 of the act provided that after 1 July 1749, no attorney or solicitor shall take, have, or retain any clerk under written contract while they have discontinued or left off practice, or during any time when they are not actively practicing or carrying on business as an attorney or solicitor.

Section 8 of the act provided that after 1 July 1749, every person who became bound by written contract to serve as a clerk to an attorney or solicitor must, during the whole time and term specified in the contract, be actually employed by that attorney or solicitor (or their agents) in the proper business, practice, or employment of an attorney or solicitor.

Section 9 of the act provided that if an attorney or solicitor dies or discontinues practice before a clerk's term expires, or the contract is canceled, or the clerk is legally discharged, the clerk may enter into a new written contract with another practicing attorney or solicitor, and such continued service shall be deemed as effective as if served with the original attorney, provided proper affidavits are filed for the subsequent contracts.

Section 10 of the act provided that after 1 July 1749, any person bound as a clerk must, before being admitted as an attorney or solicitor, file an affidavit with the proper officer confirming they have actually and truly served and been employed by practicing attorneys or solicitors for the whole required term of five years, in accordance with the true intent and meaning of the act.

Section 11 of the act provided that provided that after 29 September any sworn attorney or solicitor who knowingly acted as agent for unqualified persons, permitted their name to be used for the profit of unqualified persons, or sent process to enable unqualified persons to practice, would, upon complaint and proof to the court, be struck off the roll and permanently disbarred, with the unqualified person potentially imprisoned for up to one year.

Section 12 of the act provided that after 29 September 29 no person would act as a solicitor, attorney, or agent at any General or Quarter Sessions unless properly admitted and enrolled as an attorney in a Westminster court under the previous act, with violators subject to a £50 penalty plus costs, and any admitted attorney allowing an unadmitted person to use their name would face the same penalty.

Section 13 of the act provided that nothing in the legislation would extend to deprive attorneys of the Duchy of Lancaster, the Courts of Great Sessions in Wales, or the Counties Palatine of Chester, Lancaster and Durham from acting within their respective jurisdictions.

Section 14 of the act provided that after 29 September 1749, no Clerk of the Peace, Under-Sheriff, or their deputies could act as solicitors, attorneys, or agents at any General or Quarter Sessions in the locations where they executed their official duties, with violators subject to a £50 penalty, to ensure impartial administration of justice.

Section 15 of the act provided that clerks whose attorneys died during their five-year term who continued serving with other attorneys without formal new articles could still be admitted as attorneys if they completed their full term before 25 March 1749, despite not strictly following previous requirements for new written agreements.

Section 16 of the act provided that sworn clerks in the Office of the Six Clerks of Chancery, or those who served under contract for at least three years with a sworn clerk and then acted as waiting clerks for the remainder of their five-year term, could be examined, sworn, and admitted as solicitors in courts of equity, despite contrary provisions in previous legislation.

Section 17 of the act provided that if a sworn clerk in the Six Clerks Office died, or the contract was mutually vacated, or the clerk was legally discharged before the five-year term concluded, the clerk could complete their service with another sworn clerk in the same office through a new written contract, with such combined service deemed as effective as if completed under the original contract.

Section 18 of the act provided that no sworn clerk in the Six Clerks Office shall have more than two clerks at one and the same time, including the clerk who shall be entered on the Roll kept by the Master of the Rolls or his Secretary for that purpose.

Section 19 of the act provided that the act's requirements would not apply to attorneys or clerks in Exchequer Court offices (King's Remembrancer, Treasurer's Remembrancer, Pipe, or Office of Pleas), who could continue to be taken, bound, approved, sworn, and admitted to practice as they were before the act, including practicing in other courts with written consent from a sworn attorney of those courts.

Section 20 of the act continued the Price and Assise of Bread Act 1709 (8 Ann. c. 19) (Note: This is the chapter in The Statutes of the Realm.), as continued by the Continuance of Laws, etc. Act 1714 (1 Geo. 1. St. 2. c. 26) and the Price of Bread, etc. Act 1738 (32 Geo. 2. c. 13), from the expiration of the act until the end of the next session of parliament after 24 June 1757.

Section 21 of the act provided that after 1 August 1749, every baker must imprint specific identifying letters on bread offered for sale - a large Roman "W" on white bread, "WH" on wheaten bread, and "H" on household bread, with violators forfeiting twenty shillings to the informer to help magistrates identify bread types when handling complaints.

Section 22 of the act provided that the bread-marking regulations would only apply to the types of bread specifically in the Price and Assise of Bread Act 1709 (8 Ann. c. 19) (Note: This is the chapter in The Statutes of the Realm.), as continued by the Continuance of Laws, etc. Act 1714 (1 Geo. 1. St. 2. c. 26).

Section 23 of the act continued the Distemper Amongst Cattle Act 1745 (19 Geo. 2. c. 5), as amended and continued by the Distemper Amongst Cattle Act 1746 (20 Geo. 2. c. 4) and continued by the Insolvent Debtors Relief, etc. Act 1747 (21 Geo. 2. c. 33), from the expiration of the acts until the end of the next session of parliament after 24 September 1749.

Section 24 of the act provided that tanners and leather processors must notify the local Excise Officer before bringing cattle hides into their workplaces, producing a certificate signed by justices or land commissioners specifying the hide's color and confirming the beast was found free from infection upon examination under oath, with violators forfeiting ten pounds for each offense to control the spread of cattle distemper.

Section 25 of the act provided that Excise Officers may enter tanneries, warehouses, and leather processing facilities at any time, day or night (with a constable at night), to search for hides brought in contrary to the act and examine any tanpit or place where hides might be concealed, with a £10 penalty for anyone obstructing these officers in the execution of their duties..

Section 26 of the act provided that to encourage cattle breeding following the mortality from distemper, the King could, with advice of the Privy Council, prohibit the killing or slaughtering of cow calves in specific counties and places for designated periods, with offenders forfeiting forty shillings for each violation, to be recovered as specified in previous legislation.

Section 27 of the act provided that after 1 July 1749, no person could sell cattle until they had owned them for at least forty days, requiring sellers to produce a certificate from the previous owner showing when they purchased the animals, with violators forfeiting ten pounds per animal unless they could swear the cattle had been their property for more than forty days, to prevent the spread of disease through quick trading of infected animals.

Section 28 of the act provided that after 1 July 1749, anyone who sold cattle and provided a false or untrue certificate regarding the time of sale, as well as anyone who knowingly accepted such a false certificate, would forfeit ten pounds per offense, to be adjudged, levied, and disposed of as directed in previous sections.

Section 29 of the act provided that after 1 July 1749, drovers finding sick cattle in their herds must immediately notify local officials (constable, headborough, or churchwarden) so the animals could be slaughtered and buried if deemed infected, with violators who concealed or drove away sick animals forfeiting ten pounds to the parish poor or facing six months imprisonment if unable to pay.

Section 30 of the act provided that the King's Order in Council from 22 March 1747, which established rules and regulations for preventing the spread of cattle distemper, would remain valid, along with any future amendments or variations made with Privy Council advice during the continuance of the former acts, with violators subject to the same penalties established in those acts.

Section 31 of the act provided that all powers and authorities given by the Council Order or any subsequent Orders to justices of the peace, magistrates, land tax commissioners, inspectors, and other appointed officers shall be duly executed and are established and declared to be as good and valid in law as if they were expressly enacted in the act.

Section 32 of the act provided that after 1 June 1749, anyone who intimidated, hindered, or prevented officials from executing the cattle disease regulations, or who entered into any combination or conspiracy against the Order in Council, would forfeit fifty pounds, recoverable in courts of record at Westminster, with the fine going to the person who brought the suit, in addition to penalties under previous legislation.

Section 33 of the act provided that any legal action against persons for acts done under this legislation must be commenced within six calendar months and in the county where the act occurred, with defendants allowed to plead the general issue and give special matter in evidence that they acted in pursuance of the law, with plaintiffs who failed to follow these requirements becoming nonsuited and liable for treble costs.

Section 34 of the act provided that no writ of execution against the inhabitants of any Hundred shall be levied on particular individuals, but the sheriff must obtain a certificate from two justices to be presented to justices of the peace, who would order a taxation on all inhabitants to satisfy the judgment and cover defence costs, with the money collected being paid to the sheriff for distribution without deductions.

Section 35 of the act provided that after 29 September 1749, all writs in the Chester and Lancashire County Palatine courts could be made returnable on the first Wednesday of each vacation month or at the next session of assizes, giving plaintiffs more frequent return options, with defendants required to file special bail or enter common appearance within eight days of return, and allowing plaintiffs to sue on bail bonds if defendants failed to appear.

Section 36 of the act provided that in all cases where an oath is required by any act of Parliament, the solemn affirmation or declaration of Quakers in the form prescribed in the Quakers Act 1721 (8 Geo. 1. c. 6) shall be allowed instead, with all persons authorised to administer oaths required to accept such affirmations, which would have the same legal force, with false affirmations subject to the same penalties as perjury.

Section 37 of the act provided that despite allowing Quaker affirmations in place of oaths, no Quaker shall be qualified or permitted to give evidence in criminal cases, serve on juries, or hold any office of profit in the government.

== Subsequent developments ==
So much of the act as related to attornies and solicitors was repealed by section 1 of, and the first part of the first schedule to, the Solicitors Act 1843 (6 & 7 Vict. c. 73).

The Select Committee on Temporary Laws, Expired or Expiring, appointed in 1796, inspected and considered all temporary laws, observing irregularities in the construction of expiring laws continuance acts, making recommendations and emphasising the importance of the Committee for Expired and Expiring Laws.

The whole act was repealed by section 1 of, and the schedule to, the Statute Law Revision Act 1871 (34 & 35 Vict. c. 116), which came into force on 21 August 1871.
