= Murrain =

Umbrella term for deadly disease, especially of livestock

The word "murrain" /ˈmʌrɪn/ (like an archaic use of the word "distemper") is an antiquated term covering various infectious diseases affecting cattle and sheep. The word originates from Middle English moreine or moryne, in parallel to Late Latin morina ("plague"), a probable derivative of Latin mori ("to die").

The word "murrain", much like the word "pestilence", did not refer to a specific disease but rather served as an umbrella term for what veterinary science now recognises as a number of different diseases with high morbidity and mortality, such as rinderpest, erysipelas, foot-and-mouth disease, anthrax, and streptococcus infections. Some of these livestock diseases can also affect humans. The term "murrain" also referred to an epidemic of such a disease.

There were major sheep- and cattle-murrains in Europe during the 14th century, which, combined with the Little Ice Age, resulted in the Great Famine of 1315–1317, weakening the population of Europe before the onset of the Black Death in 1348.

== Biblical references ==
The term murrain is also used in some Bible translations relating to the fifth plague brought upon Egypt.

Exodus 9:3: "Behold, the hand of the LORD is upon thy cattle which is in the field, upon the horses, upon the asses, upon the camels, upon the oxen, and upon the sheep: there shall be a very grievous murrain."

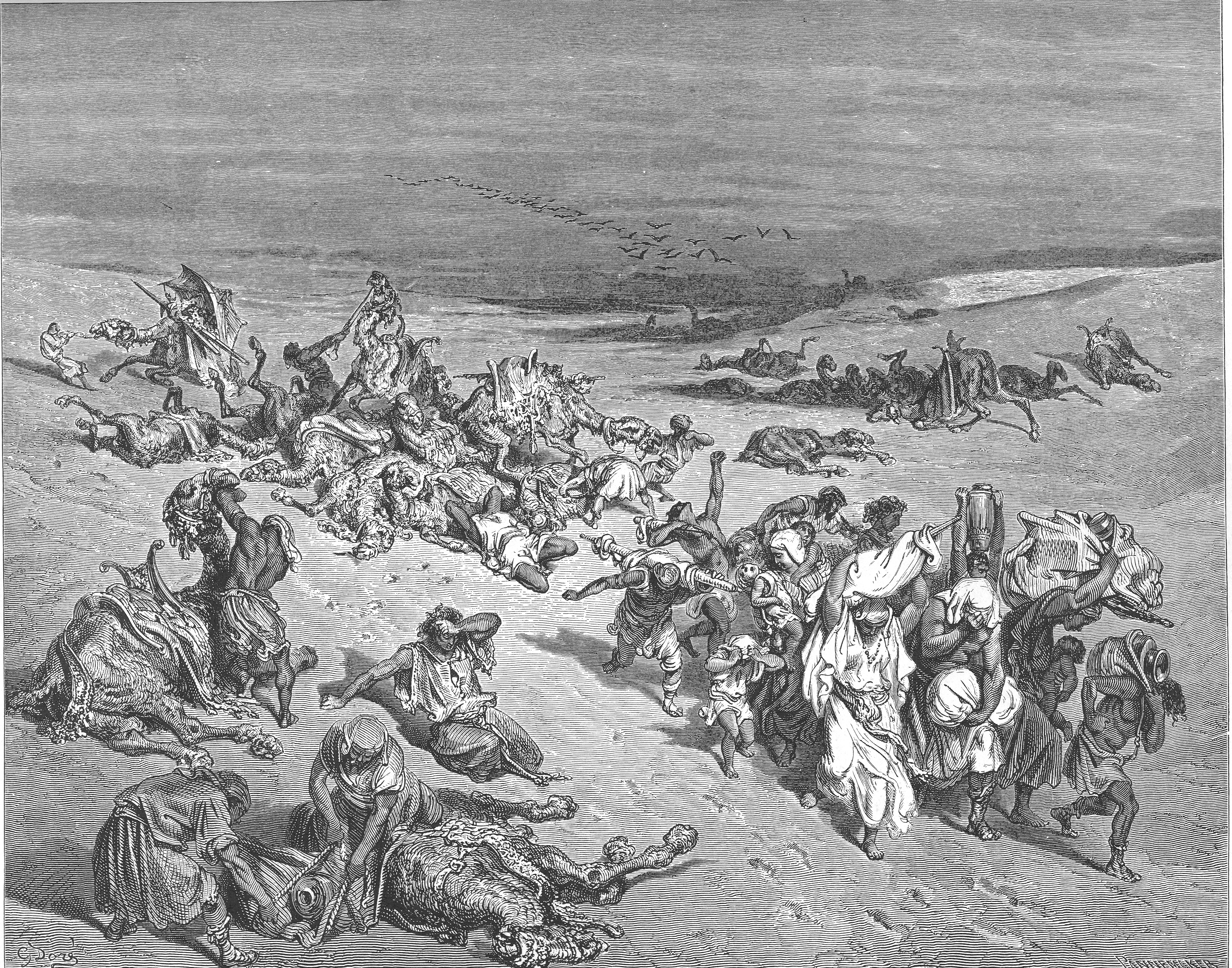
Gustave Doré's "The Murrain of Beasts" (or "The Fifth Plague: Livestock Disease"), one of his many illustrations for La Grande Bible de Tours (1866)

"Pestilence", which is mentioned 47 times in 46 verses of the Bible, can be translated "murrain" by Christian apologists. [Enhanced Strong's Lexicon]. see Psalms 91:3 KJV

The word in Hebrew is דֶּבֶר "dever" (Strong's #01698), derived from the primitive root "dabar" in the sense of "to destroy."

== Superstitions ==
In some parts of Scotland, force-fire was believed to cure it. In some remote regions of Cumbria, England, and the Isle of Man, murrain is still used as a term for a curse, specifically one placed upon land or livestock. It is believed that the medieval term has, by a process of syncreticism become synonymous with witchcraft. This usage inspired the ATV television play, Murrain, written by Manxman Nigel Kneale, which was broadcast on 27 July 1975 as part of the channel's Against the Crowd drama strand.

== Distemper among cattle in England, 1745–1757 ==
Distemper Amongst Cattle Act 1745
- Act of Parliament
- Parliament of Great Britain
- Long title: An Act to enable His Majesty to make Rules, Orders, and Regulations, more effectually to prevent the spreading of the Distemper which now rages amongst the Horned Cattle in this Kingdom.
- Citation: 19 Geo. 2. c. 5
- Territorial extent: Great Britain

Dates
- Royal assent: 13 February 1746
- Commencement: 17 October 1745 (Note: Start of session.)
- Repealed: 15 July 1867
Other legislation
Amended by	Distemper Amongst Cattle Act 1746; Insolvent Debtors Relief, etc. Act 1747; Continuance of Laws, etc. Act 1748; Distemper Amongst Cattle Act 1749; Distemper Amongst Cattle Act 1751; Distemper Amongst Cattle Act 1754; Distemper Amongst Cattle Act 1755; Cattle Distemper, Vagrancy, Marshalsea Prison, etc. Act 1753; Distemper Amongst Cattle Act 1757
Repealed by	Statute Law Revision Act 1867

Status: Repealed

Text of statute as originally enacted

Distemper Amongst Cattle Act 1746
- Act of Parliament
- Parliament of Great Britain
- Long title: An Act to continue, explain, and amend, an Act made in the last Session of Parliament, intituled, "An Act to enable His Majesty to make Rules, Orders, and Regulations, more effectually to prevent the spreading of the Distemper which now rages amongst the Horned Cattle in this Kingdom."
- Citation: 20 Geo. 2. c. 4
- Territorial extent: Great Britain

Dates
- Royal assent: 5 February 1747
- Commencement: 18 November 1746
- Repealed: 15 July 1867
Other legislation
Amends	Distemper Amongst Cattle Act 1745
Amended by	Insolvent Debtors Relief, etc. Act 1747; Continuance of Laws, etc. Act 1748; Distemper Amongst Cattle Act 1749; Distemper Amongst Cattle Act 1751; Cattle Distemper, Vagrancy, Marshalsea Prison, etc. Act 1753; Distemper Amongst Cattle Act 1754; Distemper Amongst Cattle Act 1755; Distemper Amongst Cattle Act 1757
Repealed by	Statute Law Revision Act 1867

Status: Repealed

Text of statute as originally enacted

Distemper Amongst Cattle Act 1749
- Act of Parliament
- Parliament of Great Britain
- Long title: An Act to continue several Laws, for preventing the spreading of the Distemper which now rages amongst the Horned Cattle, and for empowering His Majesty to prohibit the killing of Cow-Calves.
- Citation: 23 Geo. 2. c. 23
- Territorial extent: Great Britain

Dates
- Royal assent: 12 April 1750
- Commencement: 16 November 1749
- Repealed: 15 July 1867
Other legislation
Amends	Distemper Amongst Cattle Act 1745; Distemper Amongst Cattle Act 1746
Amended by	Distemper Amongst Cattle Act 1751; Cattle Distemper, Vagrancy, Marshalsea Prison, etc. Act 1753; Distemper Amongst Cattle Act 1754; Distemper Amongst Cattle Act 1755
Repealed by	Statute Law Revision Act 1867
Relates to	Insolvent Debtors Relief, etc. Act 1747; Continuance of Laws, etc. Act 1748; Distemper Amongst Cattle Act 1757

Status: Repealed

Text of statute as originally enacted

Distemper Amongst Cattle Act 1751
- Act of Parliament
- Parliament of Great Britain
- Long title: An Act to continue, explain, and amend, several Laws, more effectually to prevent the spreading of the Distemper which now rages amongst the Horned Cattle in this Kingdom.
- Citation: 25 Geo. 2. c. 31
- Territorial extent: Great Britain

Dates
- Royal assent: 26 March 1752
- Commencement: 14 November 1751
- Repealed: 15 July 1867
Other legislation
Amends	Distemper Amongst Cattle Act 1745; Distemper Amongst Cattle Act 1746; Distemper Amongst Cattle Act 1749
Amended by	Distemper Amongst Cattle Act 1754; Distemper Amongst Cattle Act 1755; Cattle Distemper, Vagrancy, Marshalsea Prison, etc. Act 1753; Distemper Amongst Cattle Act 1757
Repealed by	Statute Law Revision Act 1867
Relates to	Insolvent Debtors Relief, etc. Act 1747; Continuance of Laws, etc. Act 1748

Status: Repealed

Text of statute as originally enacted

Distemper Amongst Cattle Act 1754
- Act of Parliament
- Parliament of Great Britain
- Long title: An Act to continue several Laws, relating to the Distemper now raging among the Horned Cattle in this Kingdom.
- Citation: 27 Geo. 2. c. 14
- Territorial extent: Great Britain

Dates
- Royal assent: 6 April 1754
- Commencement: 15 November 1753
- Repealed: 15 July 1867
Other legislation
Amends	Distemper Amongst Cattle Act 1745; Distemper Amongst Cattle Act 1746; Distemper Amongst Cattle Act 1749; Distemper Amongst Cattle Act 1751
Amended by	Distemper Amongst Cattle Act 1755; Distemper Amongst Cattle Act 1757
Repealed by	Statute Law Revision Act 1867
Relates to	Insolvent Debtors Relief, etc. Act 1747; Continuance of Laws, etc. Act 1748; Cattle Distemper, Vagrancy, Marshalsea Prison, etc. Act 1753

Status: Repealed

Text of statute as originally enacted

Distemper Amongst Cattle Act 1755
- Act of Parliament
- Parliament of Great Britain
- Long title: An Act to continue several Laws relating to the Distemper now raging among the Horned Cattle in this Kingdom.
- Citation: 28 Geo. 2. c. 18
- Territorial extent: Great Britain

Dates
- Royal assent: 25 April 1755
- Commencement: 14 November 1754
- Repealed: 15 July 1867
Other legislation
Amends	Distemper Amongst Cattle Act 1745; Distemper Amongst Cattle Act 1746; Distemper Amongst Cattle Act 1749; Distemper Amongst Cattle Act 1751; Distemper Amongst Cattle Act 1754; Distemper Amongst Cattle Act 1757
Amended by	Continuance of Laws Act 1756; Distemper Amongst Cattle Act 1757
Repealed by	Statute Law Revision Act 1867
Relates to	Insolvent Debtors Relief, etc. Act 1747; Continuance of Laws, etc. Act 1748; Cattle Distemper, Vagrancy, Marshalsea Prison, etc. Act 1753

Status: Repealed

Text of statute as originally enacted

Distemper Amongst Cattle Act 1757
- Act of Parliament
- Parliament of Great Britain
- Long title: An Act more effectually to prevent the spreading of the Distemper now raging among the Horned Cattle in this Kingdom.
- Citation: 30 Geo. 2. c. 20
- Territorial extent: Great Britain

Dates
- Royal assent: 28 June 1757
- Commencement: 2 December 1756
- Repealed: 15 July 1867
Other legislation
Amends	Distemper Amongst Cattle Act 1745; Distemper Amongst Cattle Act 1746; Distemper Amongst Cattle Act 1749; Distemper Amongst Cattle Act 1751; Cattle Distemper, Vagrancy, Marshalsea Prison, etc. Act 1753; Distemper Amongst Cattle Act 1754; Distemper Amongst Cattle Act 1755
Repealed by	Statute Law Revision Act 1867
Relates to	Insolvent Debtors Relief, etc. Act 1747; Continuance of Laws, etc. Act 1748

Status: Repealed

Text of statute as originally enacted

In those years, acts of the Parliament of Great Britain were passed to "more effectually to prevent the spreading of distemper which now rages amongst the horned cattle in this kingdom".

For at least a dozen years, 1745-1757, a murrain made such tragic inroads upon the cattle of England that the virtual extinction of entire herds was frequently recorded. Within the period of greatest mortality, at least half a million cattle perished from the disease or were killed by official orders.

— The Cattle Distemper in Mid-Eighteenth-Century England, Charles F. Mullett, Department of History, University of Missouri
