= Legal age =

Legal age or codified age refers to age at which a person may legally engage in a certain activity, or purchase or possess a certain product or substance. Most frequently, this is the age of majority (also known as the "age of maturity"), the threshold of adulthood as recognized in law.

Other ages of legal significance include:

- Age of candidacy, the age at which a person can legally qualify to hold certain elected government offices
- Age of consent, the legal age for sexual activities, the age at which a person is considered to be legally competent to consent to sexual acts
- Age of criminal responsibility
- Driving age, the age at which a person is permitted by law to drive
- Gambling age, the age at which a person is permitted by law to gamble
- Legal drinking age, the age at which a person is permitted by law to consume alcoholic beverages
- Legal status of tattooing in European countries, includes the minimum legal age by European country in which a person can get a tattoo
- Legal status of tattooing in the United States, includes the minimum legal age by U.S. state in which a person can get a tattoo
- Legal working age, the age at which a person is allowed to work
- Legality of cannabis, includes the minimum legal age set in countries where cannabis is legal at which a person can purchase, use, and possess cannabis
- Marriageable age, the age at which a person is allowed to marry
- Regulation of electronic cigarettes, includes the minimum legal age set in some countries at which a person can purchase, use, and possess an electronic cigarette (Note: Vapes, vaporizers, vape pens, hookah pens, electronic cigarettes (e-cigarettes or e-cigs), and e-pipes are some of the many terms used to describe the generic term electronic nicotine delivery systems (ENDS).) and e-liquid
- Retirement age
- School leaving age
- Smoking age, the minimum legal age to purchase cigarettes
- Suitable age and discretion
- Voting age, the minimum legal age to be eligible to vote in a public election

== Handling of February 29 ==
If a legal age is to be attained by a person whose birthday is on February 29, the person may be deemed to reach the age by February 28 or March 1 on non-leap years depending on jurisdiction.

=== Australia ===
In Australia, the court has judged that a person whose birthday is on February 29 legally turns an adult on March 1, but not February 28.

=== Hong Kong ===
Section 5, Cap. 410 Age of Majority Ordinance specifies that where a person has been born on 29 February in a leap year, the relevant anniversary in any year other than a leap year shall be taken to be 1 March.

=== Taiwan ===
Article 121 in the Civil Code specifies that, "if there is no corresponding day in the last month, the period ends with the ending of the last day of the last month.", and article 124 specifies that "The age of a person is counted from his birthday." Therefore, if the birthday is on February 29, it falls on February 28 if the date February 29 doesn't exist in a particular year.

== Media ==
Certain classifications of media, such as films and video games, can require a minimum legal age for purchase.

== Miscellaneous ==
Certain items, which can include (but are not limited to): guns, fireworks, crossbows, knives, axes, blades, petrol, aerosol paint, solvents, lighter fuel, liqueur chocolates, and adult magazines, among others, can require a minimum legal age for purchase. This can also extend to the purchase of animals and the use of sunbeds.

== See also ==
- Adulting
- Coming of age
- List of countries by minimum driving age
