= London Transport Act 1969 =

- Act of Parliament
- Parliament of the United Kingdom
- Long title: An Act to empower the London Transport Board to construct works and to acquire lands; to extend the time for the compulsory purchase of certain lands; to confer further powers on the Board; and for other purposes.
- Citation: 1969 c. l
- Territorial extent: England and Wales

Dates
- Royal assent: 25 July 1969

Status: Current legislation

Text of statute as originally enacted

The London Transport Act 1969 (c. l) was a local act of the United Kingdom Parliament which concerned the London Transport Board. It was passed on the same day as the Transport (London) Act 1969, which provided for the abolition of the board and the transfer of its functions to London Transport Executive under the auspices of the Greater London Council.

== See also ==
- Transport Act 1968
