= List of age restrictions =

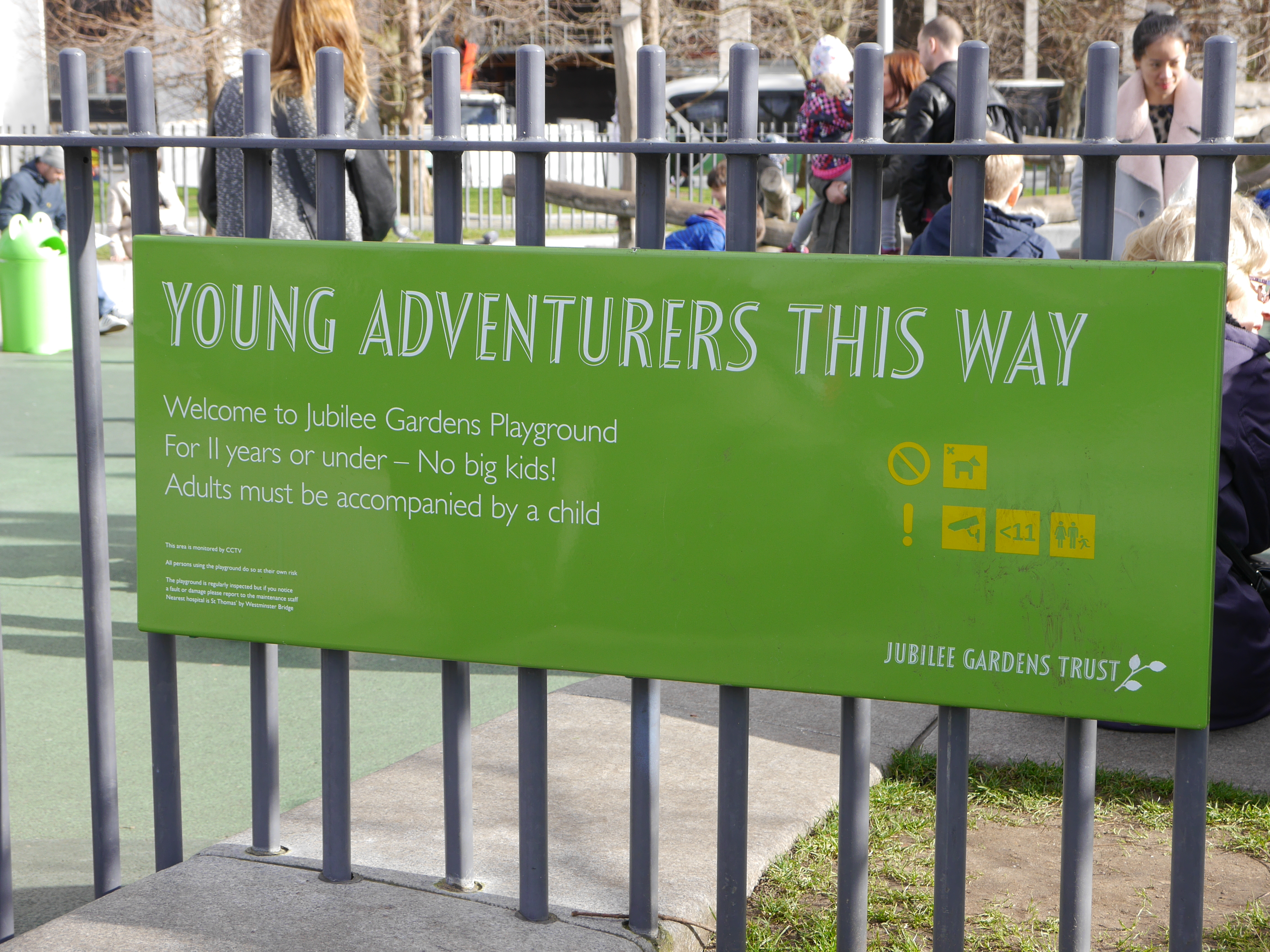
Sign at the entrance to the playground in Jubilee Gardens next to County Hall, London, noting that it is for people ages 11 and younger only and that adults must be accompanied by a child.

Age restrictions are laws, rules or recommendations which detail the given age a person must be in order to access something. Age limits often apply to minors (e.g., minimum age requirements to participate), people under/over the age of majority (e.g., minimum age thresholds to participate), or older adults (e.g., maximum age thresholds to participate)

== List ==
- Age of accountability
- Age of candidacy
- Age of consent
- Age of criminal responsibility
- Age of majority (sometimes referred to as the "minimum age")
- Age requirements in gymnastics
- Age segregation
- Aging out
- Defense of infancy
- Legal drinking age
- Legal smoking age
- Legal status of tattooing in European countries
- Legal status of tattooing in the United States
- Legal working age
- List of countries by minimum driving age
- List of enlistment age by country
- List of minimum driving ages
- Mandatory retirement
- Marriageable age
- Military-age male
- Military use of children
- Motion Picture Association film rating system
- Retirement age
- Social media age verification laws in the United States
- Social media age verification laws by country
- School-leaving age
- Voting age

== See also ==
- Adultism
- Ageism
- Age verification system
- Birthday
- Children's Online Privacy Protection Act
- Children's rights
- Driver's licenses in the United States
- Content rating
- Elder rights
- Infantilization
- Maximum age
- Old age and driving
- NSFW
- Regulation of electronic cigarettes
- Teenager (word)
- The "brain matures at 25" myth
- Youth rights
