= Adulting =

Internet neologism

Adulting is a neologism for growing up that became popular on English-speaking social media in the second half of the 2010s. American writer Kelly Williams Brown has been credited with coining the term. The term commonly refers to the tasks and activities necessary to live and function in mainstream civilized society, but are typically done only by adults due to pragmatic, financial, physical, or legal restrictions rooted in age. The primary use of the term is limited to living independently and maintaining a job; however, it also includes mundane tasks and chores.

== Examples ==
- Working and holding down a full-time employment job
- Paying yearly taxes
- Paying utility bills
- Shoveling snow
- Jury duty
- Paying monthly mortgage or rent for housing
- Driving/commuting
- Food and clothing
- Leisure and pleasure

== See also ==
- Legal age
- Life skills
