= List of acts of the Parliament of the United Kingdom from 1969 =

This is a list of acts of the Parliament of the United Kingdom passed in 1969.

Acts passed since 1963 are cited by calendar year, as opposed to the convention used for earlier acts of citing the regnal year(s) in which the relevant parliamentary session was held. Each act passed in a respective year is given a chapter number (abbreviated "c."), denoted by Arabic numerals in the case of public general acts, lowercase Roman numerals in the case of local acts, or italicised Arabic numerals in the case of personal acts. These run as separate series.

127 acts of Parliament were passed in 1969: 65 public general acts and 62 local acts.

indicates that an act has been transcribed on Wikisource, indicates that an act is available to view at legislation.gov.uk, and indicates the location of the original act in the Parliamentary Archives.

== Public general acts ==
Short title	Citation	Royal assent
Long title
Electricity (Scotland) Act 1969 (repealed)	1969 c. 1	30 January 1969
An Act to increase the statutory limits imposed on the amounts outstanding in respect of borrowings by the Scottish Electricity Boards and to amend the law with respect to the authentication of the seals of the said Boards. (Repealed by Electricity (Scotland) Act 1979 (c. 11))
Local Government Grants (Social Need) Act 1969	1969 c. 2	30 January 1969
An Act to authorise the payment to local authorities in Great Britain of grants towards expenditure incurred by reason of special social need in urban areas.
Consolidated Fund Act 1969 (repealed)	1969 c. 3	12 February 1969
An Act to apply a sum out of the Consolidated Fund to the service of the year ending on 31st March 1969. (Repealed by Statute Law (Repeals) Act 1971 (c. 52))
National Insurance &c. Act 1969	1969 c. 4	6 March 1969
An Act to postpone the coming into force of the provision made by section 3(1) of the National Insurance Act 1966 (Note: National Insurance Act 1966 (c. 6)) with respect to the entitlement of suspended workers to unemployment benefit; and to make further provision with respect to periods of limitation governing the payment of benefit under the enactments relating to social security.
New Towns Act 1969 (repealed)	1969 c. 5	6 March 1969
An Act to raise the limit on advances imposed by section 43 of the New Towns Act 1965, (Note: New Towns Act 1965 (c. 59)) as amended by subsequent enactments. (Repealed by New Towns Act 1971 (c. 81))
Shipbuilding Industry Act 1969 (repealed)	1969 c. 6	6 March 1969
An Act to amend section 7 of the Shipbuilding Industry Act 1967 (Note: Shipbuilding Industry Act 1967 (c. 40)) by increasing the amount up to which the Minister of Technology may assume liability by giving guarantees under the section. (Repealed by Shipbuilding Industry Act 1971 (c. 46))
Pensions (Increase) Act 1969 (repealed)	1969 c. 7	6 March 1969
An Act to provide for increases or supplements in respect of certain pensions. (Repealed by Pensions (Increase) Act 1971 (c. 56))
Redundancy Rebates Act 1969 (repealed)	1969 c. 8	6 March 1969
An Act to reduce the rebates payable under section 30 of the Redundancy Payments Act 1965. (Note: Redundancy Payments Act 1965 (c. 62)) (Repealed by Employment Protection (Consolidation) Act 1978 (c. 44))
Consolidated Fund (No. 2) Act 1969 (repealed)	1969 c. 9	27 March 1969
An Act to apply certain sums out of the Consolidated Fund to the service of the years ending on 31st March 1968, 1969 and 1970. (Repealed by Statute Law (Repeals) Act 1971 (c. 52))
Mines and Quarries (Tips) Act 1969	1969 c. 10	27 March 1969
An Act to make further provision in relation to tips associated with mines and quarries; to prevent disused tips constituting a danger to members of the public; and for purposes connected with those matters.
National Theatre Act 1969 (repealed)	1969 c. 11	27 March 1969
An Act to raise the limit imposed by section 1 of the National Theatre Act 1949 (Note: National Theatre Act 1949 (12, 13 & 14 Geo. 6. c. 16)) on the contributions which may be made under that section. (Repealed by National Theatre and Museum of London Act 1973 (c. 2))
Genocide Act 1969 (repealed)	1969 c. 12	27 March 1969
An Act to give effect to the Convention on the Prevention and Punishment of the Crime of Genocide. (Repealed by International Criminal Court Act 2001 (c. 17) and International Criminal Court (Scotland) Act 2001 (asp 13))
Licensing (Scotland) Act 1969	1969 c. 13	27 March 1969
An Act to amend the Licensing (Scotland) Act 1959 (Note: Licensing (Scotland) Act 1959 (7 & 8 Eliz. 2. c. 51)) so as to make provision for the establishment of licensing courts for new small burghs formed under section 133 of the Local Government (Scotland) Act 1947; (Note: Local Government (Scotland) Act 1947 (10 & 11 Geo. 6. c. 43)) and for purposes connected therewith.
Horserace Betting Levy Act 1969	1969 c. 14	27 March 1969
An Act to make further provision with respect to the contributions to be made, under Part I of the Betting, Gaming and Lotteries Act 1963, (Note: Betting, Gaming and Lotteries Act 1963 (c. 2)) by bookmakers and the Totalisator Board to the Horserace Betting Levy Board; and to amend section 24 of the said Act of 1963 with respect to the appointment and removal of members of the last-mentioned Board.
Representation of the People Act 1969 or the Sixth Reform Act (repealed)	1969 c. 15	17 April 1969
An Act to amend the law about the qualification of electors at elections to the Parliament of the United Kingdom or at local government elections in Great Britain, and the qualification for election to and membership of local authorities in England and Wales, about the conduct of and manner of voting at those elections and about candidates' election expenses thereat, and otherwise to make provision about matters incidental to those elections, and for purposes connected therewith. (Repealed by Representation of the People Act 1983 (c. 2))
Customs Duties (Dumping and Subsidies) Act 1969 (repealed)	1969 c. 16	24 April 1969
An Act to consolidate the Customs Duties (Dumping and Subsidies) Acts 1957 (Note: Customs Duties (Dumping and Subsidies) Act 1957 (5 & 6 Eliz. 2. c. 18)) and 1968 (Note: Customs Duties (Dumping and Subsidies) Amendment Act 1968 (c. 33)) and related enactments. (Repealed by Finance Act 1998 (c. 36))
Betting, Gaming and Lotteries (Amendment) Act 1969 (repealed)	1969 c. 17	16 May 1969
An Act to amend the provisions of the Betting, Gaming and Lotteries Act 1963 in relation to the maximum percentage which may be deducted by the operator from amounts staked on the totalisator. (Repealed by Deregulation (Greyhound Racing) Order 1995 (SI 1995/3231))
Nuclear Installations Act 1969 (repealed)	1969 c. 18	16 May 1969
An Act to make in the Nuclear Installations Act 1965 (Note: Nuclear Installations Act 1965 (c. 57)) certain amendments necessary to bring that Act into conformity with international agreements. (Repealed by Nuclear Installations (Liability for Damage) Order 2016 (SI 2016/562))
Decimal Currency Act 1969	1969 c. 19	16 May 1969
An Act to make further provision in connection with the introduction of a decimal currency, and to impose restrictions on the melting or breaking of metal coins.
Foreign Compensation Act 1969	1969 c. 20	16 May 1969
An Act to make provision with respect to certain property (including the proceeds thereof and any income or other property accruing therefrom) of persons formerly resident or carrying on business in Estonia, Latvia, Lithuania or a part of Czechoslovakia, Finland, Poland or Rumania which has been ceded to the Union of Soviet Socialist Republics, and to amend the Foreign Compensation Act 1950. (Note: Foreign Compensation Act 1950 (14 Geo. 6. c. 12))
Immigration Appeals Act 1969 (repealed)	1969 c. 21	16 May 1969
An Act to confer rights of appeal against the exercise by the Secretary of State and officers acting under his instructions of their powers in respect of the admission into and removal from the United Kingdom of persons to whom section 1 or 6 of the Commonwealth Immigrants Act 1962 (Note: Commonwealth Immigrants Act 1962 (10 & 11 Eliz. 2. c. 21)) applies, and to enable provision to be made by Order in Council for conferring corresponding rights of appeal on aliens; to enable deportation orders to be made without the recommendation of a court in the case of persons to whom the said section 6 applies who fail to comply with conditions subject to which they have been admitted into the United Kingdom; to make provision as respects the holding of entry certificates by certain persons to whom the said section 1 applies who seek admission into the United Kingdom; to make the owners or agents of ships and aircraft liable for certain expenses incurred in respect of persons to whom the said section 1 applies who are directed to be removed from the United Kingdom; and for purposes connected with the matters aforesaid. (Repealed by Immigration Act 1971 (c. 77))
Redundant Churches and other Religious Buildings Act 1969	1969 c. 22	16 May 1969
An Act to authorise the making of grants to the Redundant Churches Fund; to exclude section 40 of the Town and Country Planning Act 1968 (Note: Town and Country Planning Act 1968) in relation to the demolition, in certain cases, of redundant places of public worship; to provide for, and make provision in connection with, the transfer to the Minister of Housing and Local Government or the Secretary of State of certain such places; and to make other provision relating to the acquisition and maintenance by that Minister and the Secretary of State of redundant churches and other religious buildings.
Army Reserve Act 1969 (repealed)	1969 c. 23	16 May 1969
An Act to extend the period during which certain national servicemen or national service volunteers are liable to serve in the army reserve. (Repealed by Statute Law (Repeals) Act 1976 (c. 16))
Tattooing of Minors Act 1969	1969 c. 24	16 May 1969
An Act to prohibit the tattooing of persons under the age of eighteen years.
Public Health (Recurring Nuisances) Act 1969	1969 c. 25	25 June 1969
An Act to enable local authorities to deal more effectively with recurring nuisances.
Agriculture (Spring Traps) (Scotland) Act 1969 (repealed)	1969 c. 26	25 June 1969
An Act to make provision with respect to the termination of the power to authorise by order under section 50(4) of the Agriculture (Scotland) Act 1948 (Note: Agriculture (Scotland) Act 1948 (11 & 12 Geo. 6. c. 45)) the use of spring traps other than approved traps in Scotland. (Repealed by Statute Law (Repeals) Act 1975 (c. 10))
Vehicle and Driving Licences Act 1969	1969 c. 27	25 June 1969
An Act to make further provision, in relation to mechanically propelled vehicles, about the licensing, registration and marking of vehicles, the payment of excise duty, the licensing of drivers, offences and the provision of copies of test certificates; and for purposes connected with those matters.
Ponies Act 1969 (repealed)	1969 c. 28	25 June 1969
An Act to improve the conditions under which ponies are exported; to prohibit or restrict the export of certain ponies; and for purposes connected therewith. (Repealed by Animal Health Act 1981 (c. 22))
Tanzania Act 1969	1969 c. 29	25 June 1969
An Act to make provision for modifying the law in consequence of the union of Tanganyika and Zanzibar to form the United Republic of Tanganyika and Zanzibar as a republic within the Commonwealth and the subsequent adoption by that republic of the name of Tanzania; to make provision as to the operation of the Colonial and Other Territories (Divorce Jurisdiction) Acts 1926 to 1950 in relation to the courts of Tanganyika and of the united republic; and for purposes connected therewith.
Town and Country Planning (Scotland) Act 1969	1969 c. 30	25 June 1969
An Act to amend the law of Scotland relating to town and country planning, the compulsory acquisition of land and the disposal of land by public authorities; to make provision for Planning Inquiry Commissions; to make provision for grants for research relating to, and education with respect to, the planning and design of the physical environment; to extend the purposes for which Exchequer contributions may be made under the Housing and Town Development (Scotland) Act 1957; (Note: Housing and Town Development (Scotland) Act 1957 (5 & 6 Eliz. 2. c. 38)) and for connected purposes.
Appropriation Act 1969 (repealed)	1969 c. 31	25 July 1969
An Act to apply a sum out of the Consolidated Fund to the service of the year ending on 31st March 1970, and to appropriate the supplies granted in this Session of Parliament. (Repealed by Appropriation (No. 2) Act 1974 (c. 31))
Finance Act 1969	1969 c. 32	25 July 1969
An Act to grant certain duties, to alter other duties, and to amend the law relating to the National Debt and the Public Revenue, and to make further provision in connection with Finance.
Housing Act 1969	1969 c. 33	25 July 1969
An Act to make further provision for grants by local authorities and contributions out of moneys provided by Parliament towards the cost of providing dwellings by conversion or of improving dwellings and houses; to confer powers on local authorities to improve living conditions by improving the amenities of areas or of dwellings therein; to amend the law with regard to rents payable for certain dwellings in good repair and provided with certain amenities or improved with the assistance of local authorities; to make further provision with regard to houses in multiple occupation; to make further provision for payments in respect of unfit houses subject to compulsory purchase, clearance, demolition or closing orders; to alter the legal standard of fitness for human habitation and confer additional powers on local authorities to require the repair of houses; to amend the law relating to long tenancies and modify section 9(1) of the Leasehold Reform Act 1967; (Note: Leasehold Reform Act 1967 (c. 88)) to amend Part II of the Housing Subsidies Act 1967; (Note: Housing Subsidies Act 1967 (c. 29)) to amend section 46 of the Rent Act 1968; (Note: Rent Act 1968 (c. 23)) to increase the fine which may be imposed under section 170 of the Housing Act 1957; (Note: Housing Act 1957 (5 & 6 Eliz. 2. c. 56)) and for purposes connected with those matters.
Housing (Scotland) Act 1969 (repealed)	1969 c. 34	25 July 1969
An Act to prescribe a tolerable standard for houses and to make provision for the treatment of houses and areas, and for payments in respect of houses purchased or vacated, which do not meet that standard; to make new provision with respect to the repair of houses; to make further provision for grants by local authorities and contributions out of moneys provided by Parliament towards the cost of providing dwellings by conversion, or of improving dwellings; to amend the law with regard to rents payable for certain dwellings in good repair and provided with certain amenities or improved; to confer powers on local authorities in respect of the improvement of the amenities of residential areas; to provide that the replacement by a tenant of fixtures and fittings is to be disregarded in determining a fair rent under a regulated tenancy; to provide for the increase of rents of houses belonging to certain authorities without notice of removal; to amend section 160(1)(a) of the Housing (Scotland) Act 1966; (Note: Housing (Scotland) Act 1966 (c. 49)) to amend the meaning of "financial year" for the purposes of subsections (2) and (3) of section 2 of the Housing (Financial Provisions) (Scotland) Act 1968; (Note: Housing (Financial Provisions) (Scotland) Act 1968 (c. 31)) and for purposes connected with those matters. (Repealed by Housing (Scotland) Act 1987 (c. 26))
Transport (London) Act 1969	1969 c. 35	25 July 1969
An Act to make provision with respect to transport in and around Greater London and for connected purposes.
Overseas Resources Development Act 1969	1969 c. 36	25 July 1969
An Act to raise the limits imposed by the Overseas Resources Development Act 1959 (Note: Overseas Resources Development Act 1959 (7 & 8 Eliz. 2. c. 23)) on borrowings by the Commonwealth Development Corporation and on advances to the Corporation by the Minister of Overseas Development; to extend the area of operation of the Corporation; and for purposes connected with those matters.
Employer's Liability (Defective Equipment) Act 1969	1969 c. 37	25 July 1969
An Act to make further provision with respect to the liability of an employer for injury to his employee which is attributable to any defect in equipment provided by the employer for the purposes of the employer's business; and for purposes connected with the matter aforesaid.
Sharing of Church Buildings Act 1969	1969 c. 38	25 July 1969
An Act to provide for the sharing and using of church buildings by different Churches and for matters connected therewith.
Age of Majority (Scotland) Act 1969	1969 c. 39	25 July 1969
An Act to amend the law of Scotland relating to the age of majority; and for connected purposes.
Medical Act 1969 (repealed)	1969 c. 40	25 July 1969
An Act to amend the Medical Act 1956, (Note: Medical Act 1956 (4 & 5 Eliz. 2. c. 76)) and for connected purposes. (Repealed by Medical Act 1983 (c. 54))
National Mod (Scotland) Act 1969	1969 c. 41	25 July 1969
An Act to make further provision for contributions by local authorities in Scotland towards the expenses of the National Mod.
Architects Registration (Amendment) Act 1969 (repealed)	1969 c. 42	25 July 1969
An Act to amend section 14 of the Architects (Registration) Act 1931; (Note: Architects (Registration) Act 1931 (21 & 22 Geo. 5. c. 33)) to vary from time to time the proportion of the income of the Architects' Registration Council of the United Kingdom which has to be put into the fund maintained by the Council for the support of needy students of architecture; to widen the purposes of the fund; and for purposes connected therewith. (Repealed by Housing Grants, Construction and Regeneration Act 1996 (c. 53))
Air Corporations Act 1969 (repealed)	1969 c. 43	25 July 1969
An Act to make new provision in relation to the finances of the British European Airways Corporation; and to amend the provisions of the Air Corporations Act 1967 (Note: Air Corporations Act 1967 (c. 33)) relating to members of the corporations in order to prevent conflicts of interest. (Repealed by Statute Law (Repeals) Act 2004 (c. 14))
National Insurance Act 1969 (repealed)	1969 c. 44	25 July 1969
An Act to amend the provisions of the National Insurance Act 1965, (Note: National Insurance Act 1965 (c. 51)) the National Insurance (Industrial Injuries) Act 1965 (Note: National Insurance (Industrial Injuries) Act 1965 (c. 52)) and the Industrial Injuries and Diseases (Old Cases) Act 1967 (Note: Industrial Injuries and Diseases (Old Cases) Act 1967 (c. 34)) as to the rate or amount of contributions and benefit; to make further provision as to death grant under the National Insurance Act 1965, as to the assessment of disablement under the National Insurance (Industrial Injuries) Act 1965 and, for purposes of those and certain other Acts, as to the introduction of a decimal currency; to make temporary provision consequential on or related to the matters aforesaid; and for other purposes connected therewith. (Repealed by Statute Law (Repeals) Act 1978 (c. 45))
Iron and Steel Act 1969 (repealed)	1969 c. 45	25 July 1969
An Act to make new provision in relation to the finances of the British Steel Corporation and certain of their subsidiaries; to empower the Minister of Power to vest property, rights, liabilities or obligations of certain of that Corporation's subsidiaries in them and dissolve certain of their subsidiaries and, in that connection, to amend section 41 of the Iron and Steel Act 1949; (Note: Iron and Steel Act 1949 (12, 13 & 14 Geo. 6. c. 72)) to amend the enactments relating to corporation tax in their application, in certain circumstances, to that Corporation; to empower the Board of Trade to make to that Corporation grants comparable to certain of those that may be made under the Industrial Development Act 1966 (Note: Industrial Development Act 1966 (c. 34)) and the Ministry of Commerce for Northern Ireland to make to them grants comparable to certain of those that may be made under the Industrial Investment (General Assistance) Act (Northern Ireland) 1966; (Note: Industrial Investment (General Assistance) Act (Northern Ireland) 1966 (c. 41 (N.I.))) to alter that Corporation's financial year; and to make new provision with respect to the authentication of the fixing of their seal. (Repealed by Iron and Steel Act 1969 (c. 45) and Iron and Steel Act 1975 (c. 64))
Family Law Reform Act 1969	1969 c. 46	25 July 1969
An Act to amend the law relating to the age of majority, to persons who have not attained that age and to the time when a particular age is attained; to amend the law relating to the property rights of illegitimate children and of other persons whose relationship is traced through an illegitimate link; to make provision for the use of blood tests for the purpose of determining the paternity of any person in civil proceedings; to make provision with respect to the evidence required to rebut a presumption of legitimacy and illegitimacy; to make further provision, in connection with the registration of the birth of an illegitimate child, for entering the name of the father; and for connected purposes.
Nurses Act 1969	1969 c. 47	25 July 1969
An Act to amend the Nurses Act 1957 (Note: Nurses Act 1957 (5 & 6 Eliz. 2. c. 15)) and the Nurses (Scotland) Act 1951. (Note: Nurses (Scotland) Act 1951 (14 & 15 Geo. 6. c. 55))
Post Office Act 1969	1969 c. 48	25 July 1969
An Act to abolish the office of master of the Post Office, distribute the business conducted by the holder thereof amongst authorities constituted for the purpose and make provision consequential on the abolition of that office and the distribution of the business so conducted; to amend, replace or repeal certain provisions of the enactments relating to posts, telegraphs and savings banks; to amend the law relating to stamp duty; and to empower the Treasury to dispose of their interest in the shares of Cable and Wireless Limited. (Repealed for the Isle of Man by Statute Law (Repeals) Act 2004 (c. 14))
Education (Scotland) Act 1969 (repealed)	1969 c. 49	25 July 1969
An Act to amend the law relating to education in Scotland, and for connected purposes. (Repealed by Education (Scotland) Act 1980 (c. 44))
Trustee Savings Banks Act 1969 (repealed)	1969 c. 50	25 July 1969
An Act to consolidate the Trustee Savings Banks Acts 1954 to 1968, with amendments to give effect to recommendations of the Law Commission and the Scottish Law Commission. (Repealed by Trustee Savings Banks Act 1981 (c. 65))
Development of Tourism Act 1969	1969 c. 51	25 July 1969
An Act to provide for the establishment of a British Tourist Authority and Tourist Boards for England, Scotland and Wales with responsibility for promoting the development of tourism to and within Great Britain; to provide for the giving of financial assistance out of public funds for the provision of new hotels and the extension, alteration and improvement of existing hotels; to enable provision to be made for the registration of hotels and other establishments at which sleeping accommodation is provided by way of trade or business and for securing that the prices charged there for such accommodation are brought to the notice of persons seeking to avail themselves of it; and for connected purposes.
Statute Law (Repeals) Act 1969	1969 c. 52	22 October 1969
An Act to promote the reform of the statute law by the repeal, in accordance with recommendations of the Law Commission, of certain enactments which (except in so far as their effect is preserved) are no longer of practical utility, and by making other provision in connection with the repeal of those enactments.
Late Night Refreshment Houses Act 1969 (repealed)	1969 c. 53	22 October 1969
An Act to consolidate certain enactments relating to refreshment houses within the meaning of the Refreshment Houses Act 1860, (Note: Refreshment Houses Act 1860 (23 & 24 Vict. c. 27)) with corrections and improvements made under the Consolidation of Enactments (Procedure) Act 1949. (Note: Consolidation of Enactments (Procedure) Act 1949 (12, 13 & 14 Geo. 6. c. 33)) (Repealed by Licensing Act 2003 (c. 17))
Children and Young Persons Act 1969	1969 c. 54	22 October 1969
An Act to amend the law relating to children and young persons; and for purposes connected therewith.
Divorce Reform Act 1969 (repealed)	1969 c. 55	22 October 1969
An Act to amend the grounds for divorce and judicial separation; to facilitate reconciliation in matrimonial causes; and for purposes connected with the matters aforesaid. (Repealed by Matrimonial Causes Act 1973 (c. 18))
Auctions (Bidding Agreements) Act 1969	1969 c. 56	22 October 1969
An Act to amend the law with respect to proceedings for offences under the Auctions (Bidding Agreements) Act 1927; (Note: Auctions (Bidding Agreements) Act 1927 (17 & 18 Geo. 5. c. 12)) to make fresh provision as to the rights of a seller of goods by auction where an agreement subsists that a person or persons shall abstain from bidding for the goods; and for connected purposes.
Employers' Liability (Compulsory Insurance) Act 1969	1969 c. 57	22 October 1969
An Act to require employers to insure against their liability for personal injury to their employees; and for purposes connected with the matter aforesaid.
Administration of Justice Act 1969	1969 c. 58	22 October 1969
An Act to increase the jurisdiction of county courts and to amend the County Courts Act 1959; (Note: County Courts Act 1959 (7 & 8 Eliz. 2. c. 22)) to make further provision for appeals from the High Court (whether in England and Wales or in Northern Ireland) to the House of Lords; to enable wills and codicils to be made for mentally disordered persons; to make provision for interim payments to be made where proceedings are pending, and for conferring powers to be exercisable by the court before the commencement of an action, and to make further provision with respect to interest on damages; to enable any jurisdiction of the High Court to be assigned to two or more Divisions concurrently; to enable the Appeal Tribunals under the Patents Act 1949 (Note: Patents Act 1949 (12, 13 & 14 Geo. 6. c. 87)) and the Registered Designs Act 1949 (Note: Registered Designs Act 1949 (12, 13 & 14 Geo. 6. c. 88)) to consist of two or more judges; to change the title and qualification of clerks to registrars of the Chancery Division; to make further provision with respect to miscellaneous matters, that is to say, certain employments in the offices of the Supreme Court, records of grants of probate and grants of administration and the making of second and subsequent grants, admission as a public notary, pension rights and related matters in connection with certain judicial offices, and the stipend and fees of the Chancellor of the County Palatine of Durham; to extend the legislative power of the Parliament of Northern Ireland with respect to grand juries and indictments; and for purposes connected with the matters aforesaid.
Law of Property Act 1969	1969 c. 59	22 October 1969
An Act to amend Part II of the Landlord and Tenant Act 1954; (Note: Landlord and Tenant Act 1954 (2 & 3 Eliz. 2. c. 56)) to provide for the closing of the Yorkshire deeds registries; to amend the law relating to dispositions of estates and interests in land and to land charges; to make further provision as to the powers of the Lands Tribunal and court in relation to restrictive covenants affecting land; and for purposes connected with those matters.
Transport (London) Amendment Act 1969 (repealed)	1969 c. 60	11 December 1969
An Act to repeal certain provisions of section 19 of the Transport (London) Act 1969. (Note: Transport (London) Act 1969 (c. 35)) (Repealed by Statute Law (Repeals) Act 1976 (c. 16))
Expiring Laws Act 1969 (repealed)	1969 c. 61	11 December 1969
An Act to make permanent certain expiring laws and continue others. (Repealed for the United Kingdom by Statute Law (Repeals) Act 1975 (c. 10) and for the Isle of Man by Statute Law (Repeals) Act 2004 (c. 14))
Rent (Control of Increases) Act 1969 (repealed)	1969 c. 62	11 December 1969
An Act to limit increases in rents for local authority houses or payable under regulated tenancies. (Repealed by Statute Law (Repeals) Act 1976 (c. 16))
Police Act 1969 (repealed)	1969 c. 63	11 December 1969
An Act to enable assistance to be given to the Royal Ulster Constabulary by home police forces and empower the Parliament of Northern Ireland to enable assistance to be given to home police forces by the Royal Ulster Constabulary; to make provision in connection with the giving of assistance to home police forces by the Royal Ulster Constabulary; to establish a Police Council for the United Kingdom in place of the Police Council for Great Britain; and to enable certain police pensions regulations to be made with retrospective effect and alter the mode of exercising parliamentary control of the power to make them. (Repealed by Statute Law (Repeals) Act 2013 (c. 2))
Customs (Import Deposits) Act 1969 (repealed)	1969 c. 64	11 December 1969
An Act to extend for one year the period for which the duty imposed by the Customs (Import Deposits) Act 1968 (Note: Customs (Import Deposits) Act 1968 (c. 74)) may remain in force subject to the like exemptions and reliefs as were provided for by that Act, but to reduce the amount of that duty from fifty per cent. to forty per cent. of the value of the goods on which it is charged. (Repealed by Statute Law (Repeals) Act 1975 (c. 10))
Ulster Defence Regiment Act 1969 (repealed)	1969 c. 65	18 December 1969
An Act to establish the Ulster Defence Regiment and for purposes connected therewith. (Repealed by Reserve Forces Act 1980 (c. 9))

== Local acts ==
Short title	Citation	Royal assent
Long title
Saint Mary, Hornsey Act 1969	1969 c. i	30 January 1969
An Act to provide for the demolition of the church of Saint Mary, Hornsey, and for the erection of a new church in place thereof; to authorise the use for other purposes of parts of the site of the existing church and adjacent lands; and for purposes incidental thereto.
Covent Garden Market Act 1969	1969 c. ii	6 March 1969
An Act to confer further powers on the Covent Garden Market Authority; to amend the provisions of the Covent Garden Market Acts 1961 (Note: Covent Garden Market Act 1961 (9 & 10 Eliz. 2. c. 49)) and 1966; (Note: Covent Garden Market Act 1966 (c. i)) and for other purposes.
Derbyshire County Council Act 1969 (repealed)	1969 c. iii	27 March 1969
An Act to confer further powers on the Derbyshire County Council in relation to the finances of the county; and for other purposes. (Repealed by Derbyshire Act 1981 (c. xxxiv))
Tees and Hartlepool Port Authority Act 1969 (repealed)	1969 c. iv	27 March 1969
An Act to change the name of the Tees and Hartlepools Port Authority; to extend the time for the completion of certain works by the Authority; to confer further powers on the Authority; and for other purposes. (Repealed by Tees and Hartlepool Port Authority Scheme 1991 Confirmation Order 1991 (SI 1991/2908))
Derby Corporation Act 1969 (repealed)	1969 c. v	17 April 1969
An Act to confer further powers on the mayor, aldermen and burgesses of the borough of Derby in relation to the superannuation fund maintained by the council of that borough and in relation to the finances of that borough; and for other purposes. (Repealed by Derbyshire Act 1981 (c. xxxiv))
Bournemouth Corporation Act 1969 (repealed)	1969 c. vi	17 April 1969
An Act to make further provision for the investment of moneys forming part of the superannuation fund maintained by the mayor, aldermen and burgesses of the borough of Bournemouth; to confer further powers upon the said mayor, aldermen and burgesses with regard to finance; and for other purposes. (Repealed by Bournemouth Borough Council Act 1985 (c. v))
Coventry Corporation Act 1969 (repealed)	1969 c. vii	17 April 1969
An Act to confer powers upon the lord mayor, aldermen and citizens of the city of Coventry with regard to the raising of money by the issue of bills; and for other purposes. (Repealed by West Midlands County Council Act 1980 (c. xi))
Northampton County Council Act 1969	1969 c. viii	17 April 1969
An Act to make further provision for the investment of moneys forming part of the superannuation fund maintained by the Northampton County Council, to confer further powers upon that Council with regard to finance; and for other purposes.
Chelsea College, University of London Act 1969 (repealed)	1969 c. ix	17 April 1969
An Act to dissolve the Chelsea College of Science and Technology and to transfer all the rights, property and liabilities of that college to the Chelsea College, University of London; to provide for the pooling of investments and moneys of certain endowment funds of that College; and for other purposes. (Repealed by King's College London Act 1985 (c. xvi))
Glasgow Corporation (Superannuation &c.) Order Confirmation Act 1969	1969 c. x	24 April 1969
An Act to confirm a Provisional Order under the Private Legislation Procedure (Scotland) Act 1936, (Note: Private Legislation Procedure (Scotland) Act 1936 (26 Geo. 5 & 1 Edw. 8. c. 52)) relating to Glasgow Corporation (Superannuation &c.).
	Glasgow Corporation (Superannuation &c.) Order 1969 Provisional Order to extend the powers of the Corporation of the city of Glasgow with respect to the investment of their superannuation fund; to amend the Glasgow Corporation (No. 2) Order 1965; to confer power on the Corporation to facilitate the completion of title to certain lands compulsorily acquired; and for other purposes.	
Barnsley Corporation Act 1969	1969 c. xi	24 April 1969
An Act to make further provision with respect to the market undertaking of the mayor, aldermen and burgesses of the county borough of Barnsley; and for purposes connected therewith.
Foremen and Staff Mutual Benefit Society (Application of Rules) &c. Act 1969	1969 c. xii	16 May 1969
An Act to make provision with respect to the application of the rules of the Foremen and Staff Mutual Benefit Society, to make further provision with regard to the making of new rules; and for other purposes.
Barclays Bank Act 1969	1969 c. xiii	16 May 1969
An Act to carry into effect the transfer to Barclays Bank Limited of the undertaking of Martins Bank Limited; and for other purposes.
Teesside Corporation Act 1969 (repealed)	1969 c. xiv	16 May 1969
An Act to confer further powers on the mayor, aldermen and burgesses of the county borough of Teesside in relation to the finances of the county borough; and for other purposes. (Repealed by County of Cleveland Act 1987 (c. ix))
Phœnix Assurance Company Act 1969	1969 c. xv	16 May 1969
An Act to repeal the Phœnix Assurance Company's Act 1895; (Note: Phoenix Assurance Company's Act 1895 (58 & 59 Vict. c. lxxiii)) and for other purposes.
Ryde Corporation Act 1969 (repealed)	1969 c. xvi	16 May 1969
An Act to confer further powers on the mayor, aldermen and burgesses of the borough of Ryde in relation to the improvement, local government and finances of the borough; and for other purposes. (Repealed by Isle of Wight Act 1980 (c. xv))
Saint Mildred, Bread Street Act 1969	1969 c. xvii	16 May 1969
An Act to free land appurtenant to the former church of Saint Mildred, Bread Street, in the City of London, from the restrictions attaching to it as a disused burial ground in the City of London; to authorise the disposition thereof and the use thereof for other purposes; and for purposes incidental thereto.
Salisbury Railway and Market House Act 1969	1969 c. xviii	16 May 1969
An Act to confirm an agreement between the Salisbury Railway and Market House Company Limited in liquidation and the mayor, aldermen and citizens of the city of New Sarum for the sale of the Market House, Salisbury, and certain other property; to relieve the Company of its statutory obligations to provide a market; to provide for the repeal of the enactments relating to the Company; and for other purposes.
Aberdeen Corporation (Fish Market) Order Confirmation Act 1969	1969 c. xix	25 June 1969
An Act to confirm a Provisional Order under the Private Legislation Procedure (Scotland) Act 1936, relating to the Aberdeen Corporation (Fish Market).
	Aberdeen Corporation (Fish Market) Order 1969 Provisional Order to provide for the transfer of the fish market belonging to the Corporation of the City of Aberdeen to the Aberdeen Harbour Board; to confer powers on the said board with respect to the said fish market; and for purposes connected therewith.	
Edinburgh Trades Maiden Fund Order Confirmation Act 1969	1969 c. xx	25 June 1969
An Act to confirm a Provisional Order under the Private Legislation Procedure (Scotland) Act 1936, relating to the Edinburgh Trades Maiden Fund.
	Edinburgh Trades Maiden Fund Order 1969 Provisional Order to constitute a fund for the benefit of the daughters and granddaughters of craftsmen in Edinburgh and others; to confer further powers on the Governors of the Trades Maiden Hospital in Edinburgh; and for purposes connected therewith.	
Luton Corporation Act 1969 (repealed)	1969 c. xxi	25 June 1969
An Act to confer further powers upon the mayor, aldermen and burgesses of the county borough of Luton with regard to the finances of the borough; and for other purposes. (Repealed by Luton Borough Council Act 1985 (c. xi))
National Westminster Bank Act 1969	1969 c. xxii	25 June 1969
An Act to provide for the transfer to National Westminster Bank Limited of the undertakings of District Bank Limited, National Provincial Bank Limited and Westminster Bank Limited; and for other purposes incidental thereto and consequential thereon.
British Transport Docks Act 1969	1969 c. xxiii	25 June 1969
An Act to empower the British Transport Docks Board to construct works and to acquire lands; to extend the time for the compulsory purchase of certain lands; to confer further powers on the Board; and for other purposes.
Tweed Fisheries Act 1969 (repealed)	1969 c. xxiv	25 June 1969
An Act to amend the Tweed Fisheries Act 1857 (Note: Tweed Fisheries Act 1857 (20 & 21 Vict. c. cxlviii)) and the Tweed Fisheries Amendment Act 1859; (Note: Tweed Fisheries Amendment Act 1859 (22 & 23 Vict. c. lxx)) to apply certain provisions of those Acts to freshwater fish; and for other purposes. (Repealed by Scotland Act 1998 (River Tweed) Order 2006 (SI 2006/2913))
Lands Improvement Company's Amendment Act 1969	1969 c. xxv	25 June 1969
An Act to extend the powers of the Lands Improvement Company to advance money; to confer further powers on the Company with regard to finance and administration; and for other purposes.
Corn Exchange Act 1969 (repealed)	1969 c. xxvi	25 June 1969
An Act to increase the capital and borrowing powers of the Corn Exchange Company; to convert the existing capital stock into shares; to confer further powers on the Company; and for other purposes. (Repealed by Corn Exchange Act 1975 (c. xii))
Farmer & Company, Limited (Transfer of Registration) Act 1969	1969 c. xxvii	25 June 1969
An Act to make provision for the transfer to the State of New South Wales in the Commonwealth of Australia of the registered office of Farmer & Company, Limited; for the cesser of application to that company of provisions of the Companies Acts 1948 to 1967; and for other purposes incidental thereto.
Hardy Brothers, Limited (Transfer of Registration) Act 1969	1969 c. xxviii	25 June 1969
An Act to make provision for the transfer to the State of New South Wales in the Commonwealth of Australia of the registered office of Hardy Brothers, Limited; for the cesser of application to that company of provisions of the Companies Acts 1948 to 1967; and for other purposes incidental thereto.
Bristol Clifton and West of England Zoological Society Act 1969	1969 c. xxix	25 June 1969
An Act to increase the borrowing powers of the Bristol Clifton and West of England Zoological Society; and for other purposes.
Ministry of Housing and Local Government Provisional Order Confirmation (King's Lynn) Act 1969	1969 c. xxx	25 July 1969
An Act to confirm a Provisional Order of the Minister of Housing and Local Government relating to the borough of King's Lynn.
	King's Lynn Order 1969 Provisional Order amending a Local Act (Note: King's Lynn Waterworks and Borough Improvement Act 1859 (22 Vict. c. xxxii)) and a Confirming Act. (Note: Local Government Board's Provisional Orders Confirmation (Caistor Union, &c.) Act 1877 (40 & 41 Vict. c. ccxxvii))	
Clyde Port Authority Order Confirmation Act 1969	1969 c. xxxi	25 July 1969
An Act to confirm a Provisional Order under the Private Legislation Procedure (Scotland) Act 1936, relating to the Clyde Port Authority.
	Clyde Port Authority Order 1969 Provisional Order to confer further powers on the Clyde Port Authority and to amend and repeal provisions of the Clyde Port Authority Order 1965; and for other purposes.	
Dundee Corporation Order Confirmation Act 1969	1969 c. xxxii	25 July 1969
An Act to confirm a Provisional Order under the Private Legislation Procedure (Scotland) Act, 1936, relating to Dundee Corporation.
	Dundee Corporation Order 1969 Provisional Order to amend the Dundee Corporation (Consolidated Powers) Order, 1957, and to confer further powers on the Corporation of the city and royal burgh of Dundee in respect of the general administration of the said city and royal burgh and for other purposes.	
East Green, Aberdeen Order Confirmation Act 1969	1969 c. xxxiii	25 July 1969
An Act to confirm a Provisional Order under the Private Legislation Procedure (Scotland) Act 1936, relating to East Green, Aberdeen.
	East Green, Aberdeen Order 1969 Provisional Order to authorise Commercial Union Assurance Company Limited to construct buildings or structures bridging over East Green in the city and royal burgh of Aberdeen; and for other purposes.	
Forth Ports Authority Order Confirmation Act 1969	1969 c. xxxiv	25 July 1969
An Act to confirm a Provisional Order under the Private Legislation Procedure (Scotland) Act 1936, relating to the Forth Ports Authority.
	Forth Ports Authority Order 1969 Provisional Order to amend the Forth Harbour Reorganisation Scheme 1966; to confer further powers on the Forth Ports Authority; and for other purposes.	
Whitgift Charities Act 1969	1969 c. xxxv	25 July 1969
An Act to make further provision with regard to the Whitgift Almshouse Charity in the London Borough of Croydon; to confer further powers on the Governing body of the Whitgift Educational Foundation and to provide for the incorporation by statute of the said Governing body; and for other purposes.
Lever Park Act 1969	1969 c. xxxvi	25 July 1969
An Act to transfer to and vest in the county council of the administrative county of the county palatine of Lancaster certain land of the lord mayor, aldermen and citizens of the city of Liverpool forming part of Lever Park in the parish of Rivington in the rural district of Chorley; to provide for the extinguishment of public rights in, upon or over the same; to confer power upon the said lord mayor, aldermen and citizens to transfer Lever Park; and for other purposes.
Portsmouth Corporation Act 1969	1969 c. xxxvii	25 July 1969
An Act to make further provision for the local government and finances of the city of Portsmouth; and for other purposes.
York Corporation Act 1969	1969 c. xxxviii	25 July 1969
An Act to confer further powers upon the lord mayor, aldermen and citizens of the city and county of the city of York in relation to lands and streets; to make further provision in reference to the improvement, health, local government and finances of the city; and for other purposes.
City of London (Various Powers) Act 1969	1969 c. xxxix	25 July 1969
An Act to confer powers upon the Corporation of London with respect to the City of London Cemetery and Crematorium, the re-accommodation of the City of London School, the investment of the Corporation of London Charities Pool, the control of walkways; and for other purposes.
Witham Navigation Company Act 1969	1969 c. xl	25 July 1969
An Act to reorganise the capital structure of the Company of Proprietors of the Witham Navigation by reducing the nominal value of the shares and by creating and issuing to the Proprietors of the Company amounts of unsecured loan stock; to authorise the Company to dispose of their reversion to the lease of the Witham Navigation; to confer further powers on the Company; and for other purposes.
Greater London Council (Money) Act 1969	1969 c. xli	25 July 1969
An Act to regulate the expenditure on capital account and on lending to other persons by the Greater London Council during the financial period from 1st April 1969 to 30th September 1970; and for other purposes.
Saint Saviour, Paddington Act 1969	1969 c. xlii	25 July 1969
An Act to provide for the demolition of the church of Saint Saviour, Paddington and for the erection of a new church and other buildings; to authorise the use for other purposes of part of the site of the present church; and for purposes incidental thereto.
British Railways Act 1969	1969 c. xliii	25 July 1969
An Act to empower the British Railways Board to construct a work and to acquire lands; to extend the time for the compulsory purchase of certain lands; to confer further powers on the Board and C. A. E. C. Howard Limited; and for other purposes.
Kidderminster Corporation Act 1969	1969 c. xliv	25 July 1969
An Act to confer further powers on the mayor, aldermen and burgesses of the borough of Kidderminster; to make further provision with regard to the health, local government, improvement and finances of that borough; and for other purposes.
Saint Stephen, Clapham Park Act 1969	1969 c. xlv	25 July 1969
An Act to provide for the demolition of the church of Saint Stephen, Clapham Park, and for the provision of a new church and other buildings; to authorise the use for other purposes of the site of the present church; and for purposes incidental thereto.
Bedford Corporation Act 1969 (repealed)	1969 c. xlvi	25 July 1969
An Act to confer further powers upon the mayor, aldermen and burgesses of the borough of Bedford in relation to lands and streets; to make further provision with regard to the health, local government, welfare, improvement and finances of the borough; and for other purposes. (Repealed by Statute Law (Repeals) Act 1995 (c. 44))
Cardiff Corporation Act 1969	1969 c. xlvii	25 July 1969
An Act to empower the lord mayor, aldermen and citizens of the city of Cardiff to construct works and to make further provision with regard to the health, local government, welfare, improvement and finances of the city; and for other purposes.
Bradford Corporation Act 1969	1969 c. xlviii	25 July 1969
An Act to confer further powers on the lord mayor, aldermen and citizens of the city of Bradford, to make further provision with regard to the health, local government, welfare, improvement and finances of the city; and for other purposes.
Essex River and South Essex Water Act 1969	1969 c. xlix	25 July 1969
An Act to empower the Essex River Authority to construct a barrage across the estuary of the river Stour and other works; to empower the South Essex Waterworks Company to construct works and to abstract water from the river Stour; to empower the Essex River Authority and the South Essex Waterworks Company to acquire lands and rights; to confer further powers on the Essex River Authority and on the South Essex Waterworks Company; and for other purposes.
London Transport Act 1969	1969 c. l	25 July 1969
An Act to empower the London Transport Board to construct works and to acquire lands; to extend the time for the compulsory purchase of certain lands; to confer further powers on the Board; and for other purposes.
North East Lincolnshire Water Act 1969	1969 c. li	25 July 1969
An Act to make provision with respect to the supply by the North East Lincolnshire Water Board of water for non-domestic purposes in pursuance of agreements made under section 27 of the Water Act 1945; (Note: Water Act 1945 (8 & 9 Geo. 6. c. 42)) and for other purposes.
Greater London Council (General Powers) Act 1969	1969 c. lii	25 July 1969
An Act to confer further powers upon the Greater London Council and other authorities; and for other purposes.
Dudley Corporation Act 1969 (repealed)	1969 c. liii	22 October 1969
An Act to re-enact with amendments and to extend certain local enactments in force in the county borough of Dudley; to confer further powers upon the mayor, aldermen and burgesses of that borough; to make further provision in regard to the health, local government, improvement and finances of that borough; and for other purposes. (Repealed by West Midlands County Council Act 1980 (c. xi))
Warley Corporation Act 1969	1969 c. liv	22 October 1969
An Act to re-enact with amendments and to extend certain local enactments in force in the county borough of Warley; to confer further powers upon the mayor, aldermen and burgesses of that borough; to make further provision in regard to the health, local government, improvement and finances of that borough; and for other purposes.
Liverpool Corporation Act 1969	1969 c. lv	22 October 1969
An Act to confer further powers on the lord mayor, aldermen and citizens of the city of Liverpool in relation to walkways; to make further provision for the improvement, local government and finances of the city; and for other purposes.
Worcestershire County Council Act 1969	1969 c. lvi	22 October 1969
An Act to confer further powers on the Worcestershire County Council and on local authorities in the administrative county of Worcester in relation to lands, amenities and highways and the local government, improvement, health and educational services and finances of the county and of the boroughs and districts therein; to enable the Arley Ferry across the river Severn to be discontinued; and for other purposes.
Blackpool Corporation Act 1969 (repealed)	1969 c. lvii	22 October 1969
An Act to confer further powers upon the mayor, aldermen and burgesses of the borough of Blackpool, to make further provision for the improvement and local government of the borough; to enact provisions with regard to markets, finance and superannuation; and for other purposes. (Repealed by County of Lancashire Act 1984 (c. xxi))
Walsall Corporation Act 1969	1969 c. lviii	22 October 1969
An Act to re-enact with amendments and to extend certain local enactments in force in the county borough of Walsall; to make further provision for the health, local government, improvement and finances of that borough; to confer further powers upon the mayor, aldermen and burgesses of that borough; and for other purposes.
West Bromwich Corporation Act 1969	1969 c. lix	22 October 1969
An Act to re-enact with amendments and to extend certain local enactments in force in the county borough of West Bromwich; to make further provision for the health, local government, improvement and finances of that borough; to confer further powers upon the mayor, aldermen and burgesses of that borough; and for other purposes.
Wolverhampton Corporation Act 1969	1969 c. lx	22 October 1969
An Act to re-enact with amendments and to extend certain local enactments in force in the county borough of Wolverhampton; to make further provision for the health, local government, improvement and finances of that borough; to confer further powers upon the mayor, aldermen and burgesses of that borough; and for other purposes.
Glasgow Corporation Order Confirmation Act 1969	1969 c. lxi	11 December 1969
An Act to confirm a Provisional Order under the Private Legislation Procedure (Scotland) Act 1936, relating to Glasgow Corporation.
	Glasgow Corporation Order 1969 Provisional Order to make further provision for the policing of Glasgow Airport; to make further provision with respect to the finances and local government of the city of Glasgow; and for other purposes.	
Edinburgh Corporation Order Confirmation Act 1969 (repealed)	1969 c. lxii	11 December 1969
An Act to confirm a Provisional Order under the Private Legislation Procedure (Scotland) Act 1936, relating to Edinburgh Corporation. (Repealed by City of Edinburgh District Council Order Confirmation Act 1991 (c. xix))
	Edinburgh Corporation Order 1969 Provisional Order to confer powers on the Corporation of the city of Edinburgh with respect to the provision and sale of refreshments at their Meadowbank Sports Centre and other premises; to amend the Edinburgh Corporation Orders 1964 and 1967; and for other purposes.	

== See also ==
- List of acts of the Parliament of the United Kingdom
