= Corn Exchange, Salisbury =

Commercial building in Salisbury, Wiltshire, England

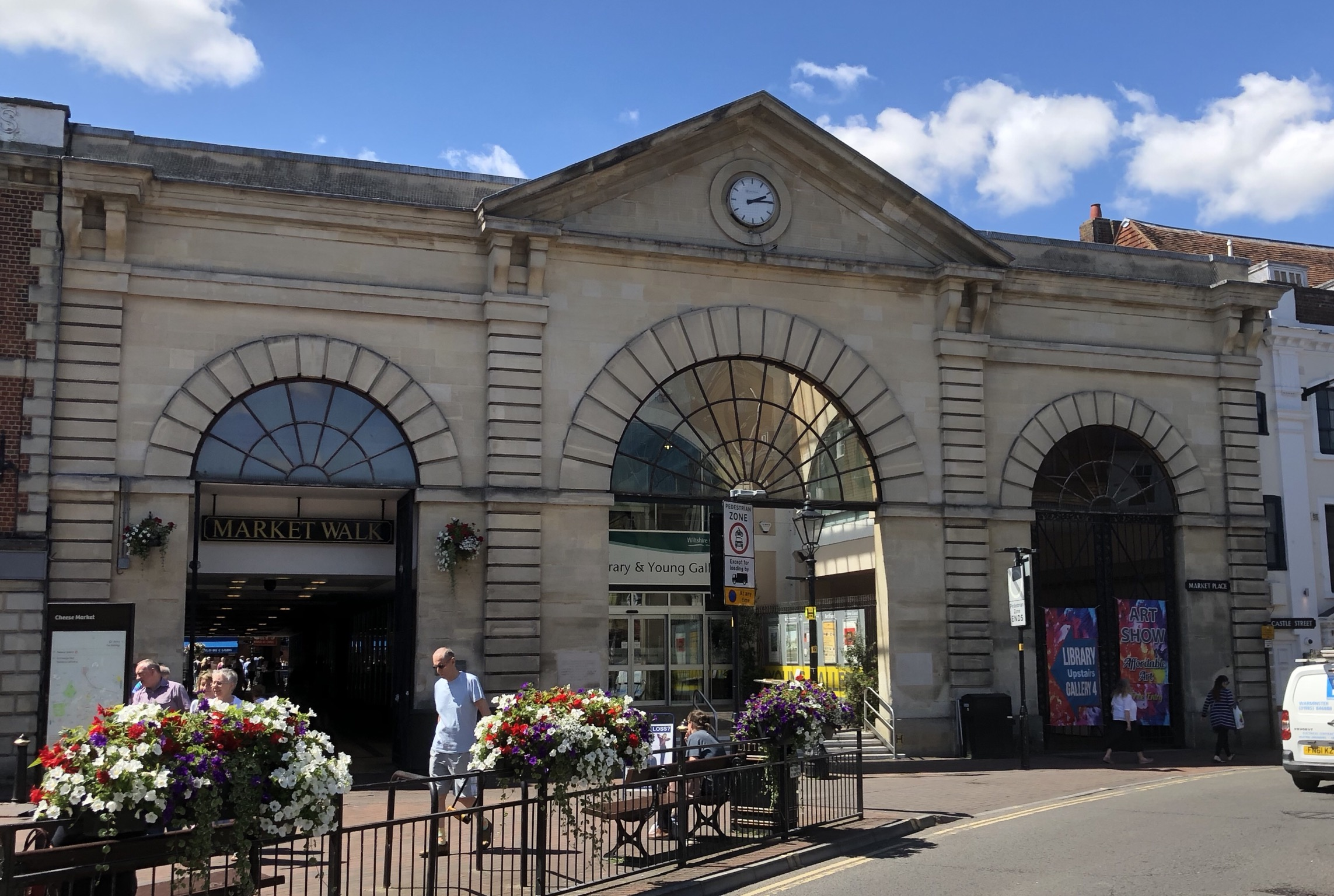
- Corn Exchange, Salisbury

- Shown in Wiltshire
- 51.0697°N 1.7968°W
- Location: Market Place, Salisbury

History
- Built: 1859

Site notes
- Architect: John Strapp
- Architectural style: Neoclassical style

Listed Building – Grade II
- Official name: The Market Hall
- Designated: 1 April 1970
- Reference no.: 1259888

The Corn Exchange, formerly the Market Hall, is a commercial building in the Market Place, Salisbury, Wiltshire, England. The structure, which accommodates a small shopping mall, a public library and an art gallery, is a Grade II listed building.

== History ==
Salisbury Railway and Market House Act 1856
- Act of Parliament
- Parliament of the United Kingdom
- Long title: An Act for incorporating the Salisbury Railway and Market House Company; for authorizing them to make and maintain a Railway and a Market House at Salisbury; and for other Purposes.
- Citation: 19 & 20 Vict. c. xciii

Dates
- Royal assent: 14 July 1856

Other legislation
- Repealed by: Salisbury Railway and Market House Act 1969

Status: Repealed

Salisbury Railway and Market House Company's Act 1864
- Act of Parliament
- Parliament of the United Kingdom
- Long title: An Act to amend "The Salisbury Railway and Market House Act, 1856;" and to enable the Company thereby incorporated to increase their Capital and for other Purposes.
- Citation: 27 & 28 Vict. c. xxi

Dates
- Royal assent: 13 May 1864

Other legislation
- Repealed by: Salisbury Railway and Market House Act 1969

Status: Repealed

In the mid-19th century, a group of local businessmen decided to form a private company, known as the "Salisbury Railway and Market House Company", to finance and commission a purpose-built market hall for the town. The site they chose, on the west side of the Market Place, had been occupied by the Maidenhead Inn, and was enclosed at the back by the River Avon. In order to maximise use of the market hall, they decided to build a branch railway line between Salisbury railway station and the market hall. The scheme was authorised by the Salisbury Railway and Market House Act 1856 (19 & 20 Vict. c. xciii).

The new building was designed by the chief engineer of the London and South Western Railway, John Strapp, in the neoclassical style, built in ashlar stone and was officially opened on 24 May 1859. The design involved a symmetrical main frontage of three bays facing onto the Market Place. The central bay featured a large round headed opening with voussoirs, flanked by banded pilasters supporting an entablature and a pediment with a clock in the tympanum. The outer bays contained slightly smaller openings with voussoirs and cast iron gates made by Hill & Smith, flanked by pilasters supporting an entablature, a cornice and a parapet. Internally, the principal room was the main hall.

The 1st Corps, Wiltshire Rifle Volunteer Corps, part of the Volunteer Force, used the market hall for drill practice after it was raised in 1860. The building was subsequently re-branded as the "Corn Exchange", although the use of the building as a corn exchange declined significantly in the wake of the Great Depression of British Agriculture in the late 19th century. The branch railway line was not affected by the nationalisation of British Railways in 1948, but was closed, following the implementation of the Beeching cuts, in 1964.

Salisbury Railway and Market House Act 1969
- Act of Parliament
- Parliament of the United Kingdom
- Long title: An Act to confirm an agreement between the Salisbury Railway and Market House Company Limited in liquidation and the mayor, aldermen and citizens of the city of New Sarum for the sale of the Market House, Salisbury, and certain other property; to relieve the Company of its statutory obligations to provide a market; to provide for the repeal of the enactments relating to the Company; and for other purposes.
- Citation: 1969 c. xviii

Dates
- Royal assent: 16 May 1969

Other legislation
- Repeals/revokes: Salisbury Railway and Market House Act 1856; Salisbury Railway and Market House Company's Act 1864

Status: Current legislation

Text of statute as originally enacted

The building continued to sell agricultural products, albeit in smaller volumes, until the site was sold to New Sarum City Council in 1969 by the Salisbury Railway and Market House Act 1969 (c. xviii), and then redeveloped in the early 1970s. The façade was retained and a small shopping mall known as the "Market Walk" was created through the left-hand opening. The central and right-hand bays were used to accommodate a public library and an art gallery, both of which relocated from buildings in Chipper Lane. The art gallery, known as the "Young Gallery", had been established to exhibit a collection of paintings assembled by a collector, Edwin Young, which had been donated to the city in 1912.

== See also ==
- Corn exchanges in England
