= Customs Duties (Dumping and Subsidies) Act 1969 =

Act of the Parliament of the United Kingdom

Customs Duties (Dumping and Subsidies) Act 1969 (Note: Section 19(1).)
- Act of Parliament
- Parliament of the United Kingdom
- Long title: An Act to consolidate the Customs Duties (Dumping and Subsidies) Acts 1957 and 1968 and related enactments.
- Citation: 1969 c. 16
- Territorial extent: United Kingdom (Note: Section 19(2).)

Dates
- Royal assent: 24 April 1969
- Commencement: 1 May 1969 (Note: Section 19(3).)
- Repealed: 31 July 1998

Other legislation
- Amends: See § Repealed enactments
- Repeals/revokes: See § Repealed enactments
- Repealed by: Finance Act 1998

Status: Repealed

Text of statute as originally enacted

Revised text of statute as amended

The Customs Duties (Dumping and Subsidies) Act 1969 (c. 16) was an act of the Parliament of the United Kingdom that consolidated enactments related to anti-dumping and countervailing customs duties in the United Kingdom.

== Provisions ==
=== Repealed enactments ===
Section 18(1) of the act repealed 3 enactments, listed in that section.

Citation	Short title	Description	Extent of repeal
5 & 6 Eliz. 2. c. 18	Customs Duties (Dumping and Subsidies) Act 1957	An Act to authorise the imposition of duties of customs where goods have been dumped or subsidised, and for connected purposes.	The whole act.
1968 c. 33	Customs Duties (Dumping and Subsidies) Amendment Act 1968	An Act to make further provision as regards the imposition of duties of customs where goods have been dumped or subsidised, and as regards duties so imposed.	The whole act.
6 & 7 Eliz. 2. c. 6	Import Duties Act 1958	An Act to confer new powers to impose duties of customs in place of the powers conferred by the Import Duties Act, 1932, and, in connection therewith, to repeal the duties of customs chargeable under or by virtue of that Act and of certain other enactments and make general provision for the purpose of customs duties as to Commonwealth preference and as to produce of the sea, and for purposes connected with the matters aforesaid.	Section 13(6).

== Subsequent developments ==
The whole act was repealed by section 154 of, and part V(4) of schedule 27 to, the Finance Act 1998, which came into force on 31 July 1998.
