= Tattooing of Minors Act 1969 =

Tattooing of Minors Act
- Act of Parliament
- Parliament of the United Kingdom
- Long title: An Act to prohibit the tattooing of persons under the age of eighteen years.
- Citation: 1969 c. 24
- Territorial extent: Great Britain

Dates
- Royal assent: 16 May 1969
- Commencement: 16 June 1969

Other legislation
- Relates to: Tattooing of Minors (Northern Ireland) Order 1979

Status: Current legislation

Text of statute as originally enacted

Revised text of statute as amended

The Tattooing of Minors Act 1969 (c. 24) is an act of Parliament of the Parliament of the United Kingdom. It gained Royal Assent on 16 May 1969, and is currently in force.

The Act made it an offence to tattoo a person under the age of eighteen, save for medical reasons.

The Act did not extend to Northern Ireland, though similar regulations were later instituted there by the Tattooing of Minors (Northern Ireland) Order 1979.

== See also ==
- Legal status of tattooing in European countries
