= Kelly Williams Brown =

American writer (born 1984)

- Born: August 6, 1984 (age 42); Covington, Louisiana, U.S.
- Education: Loyola University New Orleans
- Occupations: Writer; author

Kelly Williams Brown (born August 6, 1984, in Covington, Louisiana) is a New York Times-bestselling American writer and author. She is commonly credited with inventing the word "adulting", which refers to the small actions that together comprise maturity.

== Education and career ==
She graduated from Loyola University New Orleans with a degree in print journalism, then worked as a features writer and columnist for the Hattiesburg American in Hattiesburg, Mississippi; New Orleans CityBusiness and the Salem, Ore. Statesman Journal. Her first book, "Adulting: How to Become A Grown-Up in 468 Easy(ish) Steps", published in 2013 by Grand Central Publishing, was a New York Times-bestseller and developed into a sitcom with JJ Abrams' Bad Robot. After the option was picked up by Pacific Standard, Reese Witherspoon included it in her book club.

Her second book, Gracious: A Practical Primer on the Art of Charm, Tact and Unsinkable Strength was published in 2017 by Rodale Books.

Her third book, Easy Crafts for the Insane was published in 2022 by G.P. Putnam’s Sons.
