= Transport (London) Act 1969 =

Act of Parliament of the United Kingdom abolishishing the London Transport Board

Transport (London) Act 1969 (Note: Section 47(1).)
- Act of Parliament
- Parliament of the United Kingdom
- Long title: An Act to make provision with respect to transport in and around Greater London and for connected purposes.
- Citation: 1969 c. 35
- Territorial extent: England and Wales; Scotland (in part); Northern Ireland (in part); (Note: Section 47(3)–(4).)

Dates
- Royal assent: 25 July 1969
- Commencement: various (Note: Section 47(4).)
Other legislation
Amends	London Passenger Transport Act 1933; Transport Act 1962; London Government Act 1963
Amended by	Transport (London) Amendment Act 1969; Road Traffic Act 1972; House of Commons Disqualification Act 1975; Northern Ireland Assembly Disqualification Act 1975; Highways Act 1980; Public Passenger Vehicles Act 1981; Road Traffic Regulation Act 1984; London Regional Transport Act 1984; Local Government Act 1985

Status: Partially repealed

Text of statute as originally enacted

Revised text of statute as amended

Text of the Transport (London) Act 1969 as in force today (including any amendments) within the United Kingdom, from legislation.gov.uk.

The Transport (London) Act 1969 (c. 35) is an act of the Parliament of the United Kingdom concerning the administration of public transport in London.

== Provisions ==
The act abolished the London Transport Board.

Its main functions were transferred to a new London Transport Executive under the auspices of the Greater London Council.

The Country Bus and Coach Department was separated as London Country Bus Services, a subsidiary of the National Bus Company.

== Further developments ==
The act was amended after negotiations with the Greater London Council to enable the transfer of power. The transfer occurred in January 1970.

The Greater London Council attempted to significantly reduce fares under the act, but this was challenged in court.

== See also ==
- Transport Act 1968
