= Legal status of tattooing in the United States =

Minimum age to get a tattoo with consent from parent/guardian in the United States

In the United States of America there is no federal law regulating the practice of tattooing. However, all 50 states and the District of Columbia have statutory laws requiring a person receiving a tattoo be at least 18 years old. This is partially based on the legal principle that a minor cannot enter into a legal contract or otherwise render informed consent for a procedure. Most states permit a person under the age of 18 to receive a tattoo with permission of a parent or guardian, but some states prohibit tattooing under a certain age regardless of permission, with the exception of medical necessity (such as markings placed for radiation therapy).

In all jurisdictions, individual tattooers may also choose to place additional restrictions based on their own moral feelings, such as refusing any clients under a specific age even with parental consent, or limiting the type and/or location of where they are willing to tattoo (such as refusing any work around certain parts of the body). They may additionally refuse to perform specific artwork, including artwork they consider offensive, or refuse to work on a client they suspect may be intoxicated. Tattooers sometimes claim their personal business restrictions are a matter of law, even when it is not true, so as to avoid arguments with clients.

Legal restrictions on tattooing & body modification by state
State	Minimum age (with parent/guardian consent)	Form of parent/guardian consent	Notes and exceptions	Intoxicated/Impaired individuals	Area of law/type of penalty	Licensing and regulation	Relevant statute(s) and rules
Alabama	none specified	informed written consent, signed in presence of the artist/service provider or their agent	Ear piercing exempt from Alabama body art laws & rules.	cannot be tattooed, branded, or pierced	Violations of Alabama Tattoo & Body Piercing laws are a class c misdemeanor, punishable by a fine of up to $100 and/or up to 90 days imprisonment for each violation.	Alabama's Department of Public Health licenses Tattoo, body piercing, & body art facilities, and sets standards for their operation. Individual tattoo artists, piercers, etc. require a permit.	Ala. Code § 22-1-17A State Board of Health rules on Body Art Practices and Facilities.
Alaska	18 (piercing excepted)	parent/guardian must both give written consent and be present during the procedure	Minors may be pierced with parental consent	no restriction			Alaska Stat. § 08.13.217
Arizona	none specified	parent/guardian must be physically present	Minors can have their ears pierced with the written or verbal consent of a parent/guardian, can have procedures prescribed by a health care provider.	no restriction	Violations are a class 6 felony.	There are no health regulations for tattoo shops in Arizona.	Tattoos. Ariz. Rev. Stat. § 13-3721
Arkansas	18	Unlawful to perform on a person under eighteen years of age. Parents unable to give consent.	none specified	cannot be tattooed, branded, or pierced.			Ark. Stat. Ann. §§ 20-27-1501 et seq.
California	18 (piercing excepted)	parent/guardian must be present during procedure	Minors may have their ears pierced with parental consent. They may be pierced elsewhere with parental consent, but not on their genitals or nipples. Permanent cosmetics are permitted on nipples, when done by a cosmetic technician and with parental consent.	no restriction			Body Art. Cal. Health & Safety Code § 119300 to 119328 Cal. Penal Code 653
Colorado	none specified	parent/guardian must be present during procedure	Persons who are "noticeably impaired" cannot have body art procedures			Body Artists. Colo. Rev. Stat. § 25-4-2101 to 2103	
Connecticut	none specified	permission of parent or guardian	Minors may have their ears pierced without parental consent Tattooing may only be performed by physicians, or by registered nurses & technicians working under the supervision of a physician.	no restrictions			Conn. Gen. Stat. §19a-92a, Conn. Gen. Stat. §19a-92g
District of Columbia	18 (ear piercing excepted)	written consent (for ear piercing)	minors may have their ears pierced with written parental consent	no restrictions			Body Artists. DC Code § 47-2853.76d
Delaware	none specified	notarized written consent to the specific procedure	none specified	cannot be tattooed, branded, or body pierced			Del. Code Ann. Title 11, Ch 5 §1114(a) Del. Code Ann. Title 16, Ch 2 §122(3)(w)
Florida	16	Must be accompanied by parent or guardian who can show proof of guardianship, both parent and minor must present photo ID, and a consent form must be notarized.	for medical or dental purposes by a licensed physician or dentist	no restriction			Fla. Stat. § 381.00787 Fla. Stat. §381.0775 et seq. Fla. Stat. §381.075
Georgia	18 (body piercing excepted)	For body piercing: prior written consent of parent/guardian	Minors may have their ears pierced without parental consent Minors may be body pierced with written parental consent Physicians and Osteopaths or technicians working under their direct supervision can give minors tattoos or produce scars for "medical or cosmetic purposes." No one can be tattooed within an inch of their eye socket.	no restrictions			Ga. Code § 31-40-1 to 31-40-10 Ga. Code § 16-12-5 Ga. Code § 16-5-71.1
Hawaii	none specified	written consent of parent/guardian					Hawaii Rev. Stat. § 321-13 Hawaii Rev. Stat. § 321-379
Idaho	14	Written informed consent of parent/guardian, executed in the presence of the person performing the procedure, or their agent/employee.	Minors can have their ears pierced without parental consent. Piercing for medical procedures exempt.	no restrictions			Idaho Code § 18-1523 (2004)
Illinois	18 (body piercings excepted)	Written consent of parent/guardian (for body piercings)	Minors cannot be present in places where tattooing or body piercing is done except in the presence of a parent/guardian. Minors can have their ears pierced without parent/guardian consent.	no restrictions			Ill. Stat. 720 §5/12-10.1 Ill. Stat. 410 §54/1 t0 54/999
Indiana	none specified	Parent/guardian must both be present during the procedure and provide written permission.	Minors may have their ears pierced without parental consent.	no restrictions			Ind. Code Ann. §35-42-2-7 Ind. Code Ann. §16-19-3-4.1
Iowa	18	n/a - minors cannot be tattooed	Body piercing is not regulated by state law in Iowa, however county or city laws may regulate it.	no restrictions			Iowa Code §135.37 Iowa Code §135.37
Kansas	18	Parent/guardian must give written consent, written consent must be notarized, and the parent/guardian must be present during the procedure.	Minors may have their ears pierced	no restrictions			Kan. Stat. Ann. §65-1953 Kan. Stat. Ann. §65-1940 to 65-1954
Kentucky	none specified	Parent/guardian must give written, notarized consent.	none (ear piercing also requires written, notarized consent).				Ky. Rev. Stat. §211.760 Ky. Rev. Stat. §194A.050; 211.760 902 KAR 45.065
Louisiana	18	Parent or guardian must consent, and their presence during the procedure is required for tattoos, but not for body piercings.		no restrictions			La. Rev. Stat. Ann. §14:93.2 La. Rev. Stat. Ann. § 40:2831 et seq.
Maine	18 (piercings excepted)	For body piercings: prior legal consent of parent/guardian.	Maine law does not require parent/guardian consent for ear piercing	no restrictions			Me. Rev. Stat. Ann. Title 32 § 4201-4329
Maryland	none specified	written consent, which must be retained for 3 years.	Piercing of the ear lobe is exempt	no restriction	Health Department Regulations	A license is not required, but any person performing tattooing or piercing must comply with all the relevant health code regulations	COMAR 10.06.01.02 and 10.06.01.06
Massachusetts	18 (except body piercing other than genitalia)	For piercing of areas other than the genitalia, a parent may provide identification and sign the consent document.	Physicians performing for treatment reasons and ear piercing are exempt from regulation.	no restriction	County Health Department regulates body art, but all follow a model regulation set by the state.	Artists must have a permit, and establishments are subject to following specific health department regulations	Model Regulations for Body Art Establishments
Michigan	none specified	Written, informed consent of parent/guardian. Must be executed (signed) in the presences of the person performing the procedure, or their employee.		cannot be tattooed, branded, or body pierced.			Mich. Comp. Laws § 333.13101 to 333.13112
Minnesota	18 (piercings excepted)	For piercings: presence of parent/guardian and a consent form are both required.	Minors cannot be tattooed. They can be body pierced, but not in the nipples or genitals. Branding, scarification, suspension, subdermal implantation, microdermal, and tongue bifurcation are also prohibited for minors.	cannot have any body art procedures.			Minnesota Statutes 146B.07
Mississippi	18	n/a - minors cannot be tattooed	piercing also prohibited except for the outer perimeter or lobe of the ear.	no restriction			Miss.Code Ann. §73-61
Missouri	none specified	For both piercings and tattoos, parent/guardian must sign written consent in the presence of the person performing the procedure, or their employee.		cannot be tattooed, branded or body pierced.	violations are a misdemeanor, punishable with a fine of up to $500 (more for repeat offenses)	The state director of the division of professional registration licenses all body artists, and sets rules & regulations for the operation of body art establishments.	Mo. Rev. Stat. §324.520
Montana	none specified	Parent or guardian must give "explicit, in-person" consent. Montana administrative rules also require that the parent/guardian be present throughout the procedure.		cannot be tattooed or body pierced.	A person who tattoos or body pierces a minor without parent/guardian consent is guilty of Unlawful transactions with children, punishable by a fine of up to $500 or six months in county jail, or both. Other violations of Montana body art laws are a misdemeanor, with punishments ranging from a fine of $50–100 for a first offense to $300 and/or 90 days in county jail for third and subsequent offense.	Montana's Department of Health and Safety licenses and regulates body art establishments. Local health boards may establish their own licensing and regulatory schemes in lieu of the state department's.	Mont. Code Ann. §45-5-623 Mont. Code Ann. §50-48-101 to 110 Mont. Code Ann. §50-48-201 to 209
Nebraska	none specified	written consent, must be present during procedure	Piercing does not include the external parts of the ear	No restrictions			Nebraska Revised Statute 38-1008, 38-1009, 38-1010, 38-1011, 38-1060, 38-10,165
Nevada	n/a	n/a	Nevada state law does not regulate tattoos, piercings, or other body art. Regional health districts may regulate the practice. The southern Nevada Health District, for example, does not allow minors below the age of 14 to be tattooed, and requires a parent or guardian to provide written consent and be present during the procedure for 14- to 18-year-olds. The southern Nevada district also bans tattoos on those who are under the influence of drugs or alcohol.	Certain Nevada districts restrict tattooing and/or body piercing if intoxicated			n/a
New Hampshire	18 (piercings exempted)	For piercings: parent/guardian must both sign written consent and be present during the procedure.	Minors cannot be tattooed or branded. They may be pierced with parent/guardian consent. Minors may have their ears pierced without parent/guardian consent.	no restrictions			N.H. Rev. Stat. Ann. § 314
New Jersey	16	Parent/guardian must be present and sign written consent for ear piercings as well as for body piercing. Minors cannot have genital piercings even with parent/guardian consent.	no restrictions	no restrictions	no restrictions	N.J. Stat. Ann. §2C:40-21 N.J.A.C. 8:27-1 et seq. N.J. Stat. Ann. §26-1A-7	
New Mexico	none specified	Written consent and presence during the procedure.	Medical procedures by physicians and ear piercing are exempt	no restrictions	Administrative Regulations set by the Board of Barbers and Cosmetologists	All body artists are required to be licensed through the state, and are subject to regulations from the Board	Body Art Safe Practices Act. N.M. Stat. Ann. § 61-17B et seq., N.M. Administrative Code 16.36 et seq.
New York	18 (piercings excepted)	Minors cannot be tattooed even with parent/guardian consent. For piercings: parent/guardian must give written consent, signed in presence of the body artist or body art establishment owner.	Written parental consent is not required for ear piercings.	no restrictions			New York Public Health Law, Article 4-A N.Y. Public Health Law §460-466 N.Y. Penal Law § 260.21
North Carolina	18 (piercings excepted)	Minors cannot be tattooed, even with parent/guardian consent. "Prior consent" of parent/guardian is required for body piercings.	Minors may have their ears pierced without parental consent.	no restrictions			N.C. Gen. Stat. § 130A-283 N.C. Gen. Stat. § 14-400
North Dakota	none specified	Parent/guardian must be present during the procedure and give written consent.		cannot get tattoos or other body art			N.D. Code §23-01-35 N.D. Code §12.1-31-13
Ohio	none specified	Parent/guardian must both sign a consent form and "appear in person at the business at the time the procedure is performed."	none - parent/guardian consent and presence is also required for ear piercings.	no restrictions			Ohio Rev. Code Ann. §3730.01 to 3730.99
Oklahoma	18 (piercings excepted)	Minors cannot be tattooed, even with parent/guardian consent. For piercings: parent/guardian must both give written consent and be present during the procedure.	Ear piercing is not governed/restricted by Oklahoma law. Scleral tattooing is illegal.	cannot be tattooed.			Okla. Stat. Title 21 §842.1, 842.2, 842.3
Oregon	18 (piercings excepted)	For piercings: parent/guardian must give written consent and present proof of identity.	Minors can only be tattooed with the authorization of a physician. Scarification and dermal implants are prohibited Persons with sunburns or skin diseases or disorders cannot be tattooed or pierced. Minors cannot be pierced on the genitals or nipples, even with parent/guardian consent. Piercing on testes, deep shaft (corpus cavernosa), uvula, eyelids and sub-clavicle are all prohibited.	cannot be tattooed or pierced.	Violations of Oregon body art laws are a misdemeanor. Violations of Health Licensing Office rules are fined (various amounts).	Both body artists and body art establishments are licensed by the Oregon Health Licensing Office. With the assistance of a Board of Body Art practitioners, the Health Licensing Office also sets detailed rules and regulations for body art.	Or. Rev. Stat. § 690.350 et seq Or. Rev. Stat. § 690.401 to 410 Or. Rev. Stat. § 679.500 Health Licensing Office Rules, especially Divisions 900, 905, 915 & 920
Pennsylvania	none specified	parent/guardian must both give consent and be present during the procedure.		no restrictions			Pa. Cons. Stat. Title 18 § 6311
Rhode Island	18 (piercings excepted)	Minors cannot be tattooed. For piercings: parent/guardian must both give consent and be present for the procedure.		no restrictions	Tattooing a minor is a criminal offense (misdemeanor), maximum fine $300	Tattooing and body art are regulated by the department of health, artists must be registered.	RI Gen L § 23-1-39 RI Gen L § 11-9-15
South Carolina	18 (piercings excepted)	Minors cannot be tattooed. For piercings: parent/guardian must either give written, notarized consent or be present during the procedure.	Head, face, and neck tattoos are illegal.	cannot be tattooed or body pierced	Under the Health Code, persons violating restrictions on tattooing and body piercing are guilty of a misdemeanor. Upon conviction, they may be fined up to $2500 or imprisoned for a year, or both.	Tattoo and body piercing facilities are regulated by the Department of Health and Environmental Control. Tattoo facilities are licensed, body piercing facilities require a permit, and artists must be registered	S.C. Code § 44-32-10 to 44-32-120 S.C. Code § 44-34-10 to 44-34-110
South Dakota	none specified	Parent/guardian must sign a consent form.		cannot be tattooed or pierced	Tattooing a minor is a class 2 misdemeanor.	Tattooing and Body Piercing are governed by Department of Health rules. Municipalities may set stricter regulations, and have the authority to license body artists.	S.D. Codified Laws Ann. §26-10-19 S.D. Laws § 9-34-17
Tennessee	18 (piercings excepted)	For tattoos that cover an existing tattoo (see Notes & Exceptions): Parent/Guardian must be present during the procedure. For piercings: Parent/Guardian must give written consent, be present during the procedure.	Minors over the age of sixteen may be tattooed to cover up an existing tattoo, with parent/guardian consent.		Minors who lie about their age to be tattooed are guilty of a "delinquent act," are required to pay a fine of $50–$250 and serve at least 20 hours of community service. Tattooing a minor is a class a misdemeanor, breach of body piercing law is a class b misdemeanor.	Tattoo artists and body piercers are licensed by the state department of health, tattoo shops require a certificate from the local health department.	Tenn. Code §§ 62-38-201-310
Texas	18 (piercings excepted)	For body piercings and for covering existing tattoos (see Notes & Exceptions): Parent/guardian must be present during procedure, sign an affidavit	Ear piercing is exempt from body piercing statutes Minors may, with parent/guardian consent, be tattooed to cover up an existing tattoo that has offensive, gang-related, or drug-related content, or "other words, symbols, or markings that the person's parent or guardian considers would be in the best interest of the person to cover" Tongue splitting prohibited.	Cannot be tattooed or pierced.	Misrepresenting one's age to get a tattoo, or to get a piercing without parental consent, is a class B misdemeanor Violations of Texas tattooing & body piercing statute are a Class A misdemeanor, with each day of violation counting as a separate offense. Health Commissioner can impose a fine of up to $5000 on artists & shops for each violation	Tattoo artists and body piercers must be registered with the Texas Department of Health Tattoo and body piercing shops must be licensed	Texas Health and Safety Code Ann. §146
Utah	none specified	Parent/guardian must be present during the procedure, give written permission, and provide proof of identity.	Parental consent not required by law for ear piercing		Tattooing or body piercing a minor is a class b misdemeanor, shops can be fined up to $1000 for each violation.		Utah Code Ann. §76-10-2201
Vermont	none specified	Parent/guardian must provide written consent, signed in front of tattooist.	Parental consent not required by law for any form of piercing. Also excluded is ear lobe piercing with a piercing gun, ear lobe piercing of oneself, ear lobe piercing by a minor's parent/guardian, or ear lobe piercing by an adult's household member.	Cannot practice tattooing or body piercing.		Tattooists and body piercers must be licensed.	Vt. Stat. Ann. Title 26 §4101 to 4109 Vermont Administrative Rule 20-4-18.
Virginia	none specified	Parent/Guardian must be present during the procedure.	Virginia law does not limit minors' ability to have their ears pierced.		Tattooing or body piercing a minor is a class 1 misdemeanor	Tattoo artists and body piercers, as well as the operators of tattoo and body piercing establishments, are licensed by the state. Civic/local governments are empowered to regulate tattoo and body piercing establishments.	Va. Code §54.1-700 et seq. Va. Code §15.2-912 Va. Code § 18.2-371.3.
Washington	18 (piercings excepted)			cannot have tattoos, body piercings, or other body art.			Wash. Code §26.28.085 Wash. Code § 18.300 Wash. Code § 246-145-001 to 060 Wash. Code §70.54
West Virginia	none specified	parent/guardian must give written consent		All persons receiving a tattoo must attest they are not under the influence of drugs or alcohol.		Tattoo shop owners and body piercing studios must register with local board of health, and must be registered as a business with the state	W. Va. Code §16-37 W. Va. Code §16-38
Wisconsin	18	n/a (tattooing not permitted under 18)	Physicians in the course of professional practice are exempt	no restriction	Tattooing a minor or even offering to do so is subject to a fine of up to $200	Artists must be satisfy training requirements and obtain a license from the health department. Establishments are subject to inspection and licensing	Wisconsin Statutes & Annotations 948.70 and 252.235
Wyoming	none specified	Verbal consent, presence during procedure.	Procedures performed under the supervision of a licensed physician, and piercing of the ear, do not count as body art for this law.	no restriction	Misdemeanor criminal offense, punishable by fine and prison time		Wyoming Statute §14-3-107

== See also ==
- Legal status of tattooing in European countries
