= Legal status of tattooing in European countries =

Minimum age to get a tattoo in various European countries (2023): 18 years exclusively 18 years, from 16 years with authorisation 18 years, from 14–17 years (varies by region) with authorisation 18 years, no minimum age with authorisation 16 years exclusively No regulation No data

Legislation controlling tattooing varies among countries in Europe. In many countries there is no particular legislation. In countries that do have legal controls, they relate mainly to the minimum age of clients. Greece and Denmark impose further stipulations.

== Legal controls by European country ==
Country	Age (with authorisation)	Age (without authorisation)	Notes
Armenia	No legislation		
Austria	16	18	Parental consent can be written if under 18.
Belgium	16	18	Parents must be present to give consent for children.
Bulgaria	No legislation		
Croatia	16	18	Parents must be present to give consent for children.
Cyprus	16	18	
Czech Republic	No legislation		
Denmark	18		The Danish tattoo law was valid from 15 June 1966. It is unlawful to tattoo someone under the age of 18. In addition to this it is unlawful to tattoo someone on the head, neck and hands.
Estonia	18		In Estonia, providers of tattooing services are prohibited from offering these services to minors.
Finland	Unspecified age	18	Permit required for anyone under 18.
France	No legislation	18	Parental consent required for anyone under 18.
Germany	No legislation		
Greece	16	18	Greek tattoo law only covers tattoos and not permanent make-up. Other key provisions, in a non-exhaustive summary: Only tattoo people who are at least 18 years of age. People under the age of 18 may only be tattooed in the presence of a guardian who has given the required written consent.; Not advise on the customer's state of physical health or offer any medical opinion.; Not effect any medical procedure, be it on the recommendation, under the guidance or with the help of any form of medical specialist.; Not proceed in any manner whatsoever to remove a tattoo.
Guernsey	18		As in the UK, a person under 18 may not be tattooed except for medical reasons, per the Tattooing, Piercing, Acupuncture and Electrolysis (Guernsey and Alderney) Law, 2000. In practise the law is rarely enforced.
Hungary	No legislation		
Republic of Ireland	No legislation		16 is de facto with parents present throughout Ireland, but there is no legislation. From the age of 18 without parental authorisation.
Isle of Man	18		As in the UK, a person under 18 may not be tattooed except for medical reasons, per the Local Government (Miscellaneous Provisions) Act 1984.
Italy	No legislation		One must be over 18 years of age to get a tattoo freely without parental consent. Those over the age of 16 must have parental consent.
Jersey	16	18	Unlike in the UK, the Isle of Man or Guernsey, the minimum age to obtain a tattoo in Jersey is set at 16 (with parental consent), under the Piercing and Tattooing (Jersey) Law 2002 or 18+ without parental consent.
Latvia	18		
Lithuania	16	18	In Lithuania one can get a tattoo from the age of 16, or in the presence of a guardian or a parent who has given the required written consent if one is under this age.
Luxembourg	16	18	In Luxembourg, the legal age to obtain a tattoo is 16, with parental consent.
Malta	--	18	In Malta, it is no longer legal to get tattooed with the parents/guardians' consent. You can only get tattooed after your 18th birthday.
Netherlands	16		In the Netherlands, the age at which persons may decide for themselves to have a tattoo and piercing is 16 years. This age limit is suspended for earlobe piercing but pertains to all other areas. Informed consent forms, with information concerning health (including allergies) must be available and must be signed by the client. In the case of young adults under 16 years, a parent or guardian must sign. If they have signed but are not present with the client, the tattooist or piercer must verify their consent by telephone. Signed consent forms must be kept by the studio in a locked file for ten years.
Norway	No legislation		
Poland	16	18	
Portugal	16	18	
Romania	18		
Slovakia	16	18	
Slovenia	No legislation		
Spain	14–17	18	Age varies by region.
Sweden	No legislation	18	Sweden has no law regulating tattoos specifically but – according to the Swedish National Board of Health and Welfare – any minor has to have the permission of their legal guardian to get a tattoo. The restriction is based on an interpretation of the Children and Parents Code (Föräldrabalken).
United Kingdom	None	18	In the United Kingdom, tattoos are regulated by both the Tattooing of Minors Act 1969 and the Tattooing of Minors (Northern Ireland) Order 1979. The former applies to Great Britain and the latter applies to Northern Ireland. Both acts in principle define a minor (in relation to obtaining a tattoo) as any person under the age of 18. However, both acts allow for exceptions in which any person below the minimum age may obtain a tattoo for medical reasons, when performed by a duly qualified medical practitioner or by a person working under their direction.

== See also ==
- Legal status of tattooing in the United States
- Medical tattoo
