= List of acts of the Parliament of the United Kingdom from 1847 =

This is a complete list of acts of the Parliament of the United Kingdom for the year 1847.

Note that the first parliament of the United Kingdom was held in 1801; parliaments between 1707 and 1800 were either parliaments of Great Britain or of Ireland). For acts passed up until 1707, see the list of acts of the Parliament of England and the list of acts of the Parliament of Scotland. For acts passed from 1707 to 1800, see the list of acts of the Parliament of Great Britain. See also the list of acts of the Parliament of Ireland.

For acts of the devolved parliaments and assemblies in the United Kingdom, see the list of acts of the Scottish Parliament, the list of acts of the Northern Ireland Assembly, and the list of acts and measures of Senedd Cymru; see also the list of acts of the Parliament of Northern Ireland.

The number shown after each act's title is its chapter number. Acts passed before 1963 are cited using this number, preceded by the year(s) of the reign during which the relevant parliamentary session was held; thus the Union with Ireland Act 1800 is cited as "39 & 40 Geo. 3 c. 67", meaning the 67th act passed during the session that started in the 39th year of the reign of George III and which finished in the 40th year of that reign. Note that the modern convention is to use Arabic numerals in citations (thus "41 Geo. 3" rather than "41 Geo. III"). Acts of the last session of the Parliament of Great Britain and the first session of the Parliament of the United Kingdom are both cited as "41 Geo. 3".

Some of these acts have a short title. Some of these acts have never had a short title. Some of these acts have a short title given to them by later acts, such as by the Short Titles Act 1896.

== 10 & 11 Vict. ==
The seventh session of the 14th Parliament of the United Kingdom, which met from 19 January 1847 until 23 July 1847.

=== Public general acts ===
Short title	Citation	Royal assent
Long title
Corn Duties Act 1847 (repealed)	10 & 11 Vict. c. 1	26 January 1847
An Act to suspend, until the First Day of September One thousand eight hundred and forty-seven, the Duties on the Importation of Corn. (Repealed by Statute Law Revision Act 1875 (38 & 39 Vict. c. 66))
Importation Act 1847 (repealed)	10 & 11 Vict. c. 2	26 January 1847
An Act to allow, until the First Day of September One thousand eight hundred and forty-seven, the Importation of Corn from any Country in Foreign Ships. (Repealed by Statute Law Revision Act 1875 (38 & 39 Vict. c. 66))
Duties on Buckwheat, etc. Act 1847 (repealed)	10 & 11 Vict. c. 3	23 February 1847
An Act to suspend, until the First Day of September One thousand eight hundred and forty-seven, the Duties on the Importation of Buck Wheat, Buck Wheat Meal, Maize or Indian Corn, Indian Corn Meal, and Rice. (Repealed by Statute Law Revision Act 1875 (38 & 39 Vict. c. 66))
Chelsea Pensions (Abolition of Poundage) Act 1847 (repealed)	10 & 11 Vict. c. 4	23 February 1847
An Act for abolishing Poundage on Chelsea Pensions. (Repealed by Statute Law (Repeals) Act 1976 (c. 16))
Sugar in Brewing Act 1847 (repealed)	10 & 11 Vict. c. 5	23 February 1847
An Act to allow the Use of Sugar in the brewing of Beer. (Repealed by Inland Revenue Act 1880 (43 & 44 Vict. c. 20))
Distillation of Spirits from Sugar Act 1847 (repealed)	10 & 11 Vict. c. 6	23 February 1847
An Act to further encourage the Distillation of Spirits from Sugar in the United Kingdom. (Repealed by Distillation of Spirits from Sugar, etc. Act 1848 (11 & 12 Vict. c. 100) and Spirits Act 1860 (23 & 24 Vict. c. 114))
Temporary Relief Act 1847 or the Poor Relief (Ireland) Act 1847 (repealed)	10 & 11 Vict. c. 7	26 February 1847
An Act for the temporary Relief of destitute Persons in Ireland. (Repealed by Statute Law Revision Act 1875 (38 & 39 Vict. c. 66))
Supply Act 1847 (repealed)	10 & 11 Vict. c. 8	18 March 1847
An Act to apply the Sum of Eight Millions out of the Consolidated Fund to the Service of the Year One thousand eight hundred and forty-seven. (Repealed by Statute Law Revision Act 1875 (38 & 39 Vict. c. 66))
National Debt Act 1847 (repealed)	10 & 11 Vict. c. 9	18 March 1847
An Act for raising the Sum of Eight Millions by way of Annuities. (Repealed by Statute Law Revision Act 1870 (33 & 34 Vict. c. 69))
Poor Relief (Ireland) (No. 1) Act 1847 (repealed)	10 & 11 Vict. c. 10	18 March 1847
An Act to render valid certain Proceedings for the Relief of Distress in Ireland, by Employment of the labouring Poor, and to indemnify those who have acted in such Proceedings. (Repealed by Statute Law Revision Act 1875 (38 & 39 Vict. c. 66))
Public Money Drainage Act 1847 (repealed)	10 & 11 Vict. c. 11	30 March 1847
An Act to explain and amend the Act (Note: Public Money Drainage Act 1846 (9 & 10 Vict. c. 101)) authorizing the Advance of Money for the Improvement of Land by Drainage in Great Britain. (Repealed by Statute Law Revision Act 1958 (6 & 7 Eliz. 2. c. 46))
Mutiny Act 1847 (repealed)	10 & 11 Vict. c. 12	23 April 1847
An Act for punishing Mutiny and Desertion, and for the better Payment of the Army and their Quarters. (Repealed by Statute Law Revision Act 1875 (38 & 39 Vict. c. 66))
Marine Mutiny Act 1847 (repealed)	10 & 11 Vict. c. 13	23 April 1847
An Act for the Regulation of Her Majesty's Royal Marine Forces while on Shore. (Repealed by Statute Law Revision Act 1875 (38 & 39 Vict. c. 66))
Markets and Fairs Clauses Act 1847	10 & 11 Vict. c. 14	23 April 1847
An Act for consolidating in One Act certain Provisions usually contained in Acts for constructing or regulating Markets and Fairs.
Gasworks Clauses Act 1847 (repealed)	10 & 11 Vict. c. 15	23 April 1847
An Act for consolidating in one Act certain provisions usually contained in Acts authorizing the making of Gasworks for supplying towns with Gas. (Repealed for England and Wales and Scotland by Gas Act 1948 (11 & 12 Geo. 6. c. 67) and for Northern Ireland by Gas (Northern Ireland) Order 1977 (SI 1977/596 (N.I. 7)))
Commissioners Clauses Act 1847	10 & 11 Vict. c. 16	23 April 1847
An Act for consolidating in One Act certain Provisions usually contained in Acts with respect to the Constitution and Regulation of Bodies of Commissioners appointed for carrying on Undertakings of a public Nature.
Waterworks Clauses Act 1847 (repealed)	10 & 11 Vict. c. 17	23 April 1847
An Act for consolidating in one Act certain Provisions usually contained in Acts authorising the making of Waterworks for supplying Towns with Water. (Repealed for England and Wales by Water Act 1945 (8 & 9 Geo. 6. c. 42) and for Scotland by Water (Scotland) Act 1946 (9 & 10 Geo. 6. c. 42))
Indemnity Act 1847 (repealed)	10 & 11 Vict. c. 18	23 April 1847
An Act to indemnify such Persons in the United Kingdom as have omitted to qualify themselves for Offices and Employments, and to extend the Time limited for those Purposes respectively until the Twenty-fifth Day of March One thousand eight hundred and forty-eight. (Repealed by Promissory Oaths Act 1871 (34 & 35 Vict. c. 48))
Exchequer Bills Act 1847 (repealed)	10 & 11 Vict. c. 19	23 April 1847
An Act for raising the Sum of Eighteen millions three hundred and ten thousand seven hundred Pounds by Exchequer Bills, for the Service of the Year One thousand eight hundred and forty-seven. (Repealed by Statute Law Revision Act 1875 (38 & 39 Vict. c. 66))
General Register House, Edinburgh Act 1847 (repealed)	10 & 11 Vict. c. 20	23 April 1847
An Act to authorize the Application of certain Sums received on account of the Fees payable to the Office of Director in Chancery in Scotland towards the Payment of Debts incurred in completing the General Register House at Edinburgh. (Repealed by Statute Law Revision Act 1875 (38 & 39 Vict. c. 66))
Parliamentary Elections (Soldiers) Act 1847 (repealed)	10 & 11 Vict. c. 21	23 April 1847
An Act to regulate the Stations of Soldiers during Parliamentary Elections. (Repealed by Parliamentary Elections (Soldiers) Act 1919 (9 & 10 Geo. 5. c. 10))
Fever (Ireland) Act 1847 (repealed)	10 & 11 Vict. c. 22	27 April 1847
An Act to amend, and continue until the First Day of November One thousand eight hundred and forty-seven, and to the End of the then next Session of Parliament, an Act (Note: Fever (Ireland) Act 1846 (9 & 10 Vict. c. 6)) for making Provision for the Treatment of poor Persons afflicted with Fever in Ireland. (Repealed by Statute Law Revision Act 1875 (38 & 39 Vict. c. 66))
Customs Act 1847 (repealed)	10 & 11 Vict. c. 23	11 May 1847
An Act to alter certain Duties of Customs. (Repealed by Customs Consolidation Act 1853 (16 & 17 Vict. c. 107))
Portland Breakwater Act 1847	10 & 11 Vict. c. 24	11 May 1847
An Act to empower the Commissioners of Her Majesty's Woods to purchase Land for the Purposes of a Harbour of Refuge and Breakwater in the Isle of Portland in the County of Dorset.
Inclosures Act 1847	10 & 11 Vict. c. 25	11 May 1847
An Act to authorize the Inclosure of certain Lands, in pursuance of the Second Report of the Inclosure Commissioners for England and Wales.
Land for Prisons (Ireland) Act 1847 (repealed)	10 & 11 Vict. c. 26	11 May 1847
An Act for enabling the Commissioners of Public Works in Ireland to purchase Land for Prisons in Ireland. (Repealed by Statute Law Revision Act 1892 (55 & 56 Vict. c. 19))
Harbours, Docks, and Piers Clauses Act 1847 or the Harbours Clauses Act 1847	10 & 11 Vict. c. 27	11 May 1847
An Act for consolidating in One Act certain Provisions usually contained in Acts authorizing the making and improving of Harbours, Docks, and Piers.
County Buildings Act 1847 (repealed)	10 & 11 Vict. c. 28	8 June 1847
An Act to amend the Acts relating to County Buildings. (Repealed by Courts Act 1971 (c. 23))
Factories Act 1847 or the Factory Act 1847 or the Ten Hours Act (repealed)	10 & 11 Vict. c. 29	8 June 1847
An Act to limit the Hours of Labour of young Persons and Females in Factories. (Repealed by Factory Act 1874 (37 & 38 Vict. c. 44))
Naval Service of Boys Act 1847 (repealed)	10 & 11 Vict. c. 30	8 June 1847
An Act for extending the Period of Service of Boys in Her Majesty's Navy. (Repealed by Naval Enlistment Act 1853 (16 & 17 Vict. c. 69))
Poor Relief (Ireland) Act 1847 or the Irish Poor Law Extension Act 1847 or the Poor Law Amendment Act 1847 (repealed)	10 & 11 Vict. c. 31	8 June 1847
An Act to make further Provision for the Relief of the destitute Poor in Ireland. (Repealed by Statute Law Revision Act (Northern Ireland) 1954 (c. 35 (N.I.)) and Health and Personal Social Services (Northern Ireland) Order 1972 (SI 1972/1265 (N.I. 14)))
Landed Property Improvement (Ireland) Act 1847	10 & 11 Vict. c. 32	8 June 1847
An Act to facilitate the Improvement of Landed Property in Ireland.
Poor Removal Act 1847 (repealed)	10 & 11 Vict. c. 33	21 June 1847
An Act to amend the Laws relating to the Removal of poor Persons from England and Scotland. (Repealed for England and Wales and Scotland by National Assistance Act 1948 (11 & 12 Geo. 6. c. 29) and for Northern Ireland by Statute Law Revision Act (Northern Ireland) 1954 (c. 35 (N.I.)))
Towns Improvement Clauses Act 1847	10 & 11 Vict. c. 34	21 June 1847
An Act for consolidating in One Act certain Provisions usually contained in Acts for paving, draining, cleansing, lighting, and improving Towns.
Turnpike Roads (Ireland) Act 1847 (repealed)	10 & 11 Vict. c. 35	21 June 1847
An Act to continue until the Thirty-first Day of July One thousand eight hundred and forty-eight, and to the End of the then Session of Parliament, certain Acts for regulating Turnpike Roads in Ireland. (Repealed by Statute Law Revision Act 1875 (38 & 39 Vict. c. 66))
Subscriptions to Loan Act 1847 (repealed)	10 & 11 Vict. c. 36	21 June 1847
An Act for allowing the Subscriptions to the Loan of Eight Millions raised in the Year One thousand eight hundred and forty-seven to be paid up under Discount. (Repealed by Statute Law Revision Act 1875 (38 & 39 Vict. c. 66))
Time of Service in the Army Act 1847 (repealed)	10 & 11 Vict. c. 37	21 June 1847
An Act for limiting the Time of Service in the Army. (Repealed by Army Enlistment Act 1867 (30 & 31 Vict. c. 34) and Regulation of the Forces Act 1881 (44 & 45 Vict. c. 57))
Land Drainage Act 1847 (repealed)	10 & 11 Vict. c. 38	21 June 1847
An Act to facilitate the Drainage of Lands in England and Wales. (Repealed by Land Drainage Act 1930 (20 & 21 Geo. 5. c. 44))
Burgh Police, etc. (Scotland) Act 1847 or the General Police (Scotland) Act 1847 (repealed)	10 & 11 Vict. c. 39	21 June 1847
An Act to amend an Act (Note: Burgh Police (Scotland) Act 1833 (3 & 4 Will. 4. c. 46)) to enable Burghs in Scotland to establish a general System of Police, and another Act (Note: Parliamentary Burghs (Scotland) Act 1833 (3 & 4 Will. 4. c. 77)) for providing for the Appointment and Election of Magistrates and Councillors for certain Burghs and Towns of Scotland. (Repealed by Burgh Police (Scotland) Act 1892 (55 & 56 Vict. c. 55))
Lunatic Asylum (Ireland) Act 1847 (repealed)	10 & 11 Vict. c. 40	21 June 1847
An Act to continue until the Thirty-first Day of July One thousand eight hundred and forty-eight, and to the End of the then next Session of Parliament, an Act of the Fifth and Sixth Years of Her present Majesty, (Note: Private Lunatic Asylums (Ireland) Act 1842 (5 & 6 Vict. c. 123)) for amending the Law relative to private Lunatic Asylums in Ireland. (Repealed by Statute Law Revision Act 1875 (38 & 39 Vict. c. 66))
Soap Duties Allowances Act 1847 (repealed)	10 & 11 Vict. c. 41	25 June 1847
An Act to continue until the Thirty-first Day of July One thousand eight hundred and forty-eight, and to the End of the then next Session of Parliament, certain of the Allowances of the Duty of Excise on Soap used in Manufactures. (Repealed by Statute Law Revision Act 1875 (38 & 39 Vict. c. 66))
Railway Passenger Duty Act 1847 (repealed)	10 & 11 Vict. c. 42	25 June 1847
An Act to transfer the Collection and Management of the Duties in respect of Stage Carriages, Hackney Carriages, and Railway Passengers from the Commissioners of Stamps and Taxes to the Commissioners of Excise. (Repealed by Finance Act 1929 (19 & 20 Geo. 5. c. 21))
Lunatic Asylums Act 1847 (repealed)	10 & 11 Vict. c. 43	25 June 1847
An Act for the Amendment of the Laws relating to the Provision and Regulation of Lunatic Asylums for Counties and Boroughs in England. (Repealed by Lunatic Asylums Act 1853 (16 & 17 Vict. c. 97))
Government of Newfoundland Act 1847 (repealed)	10 & 11 Vict. c. 44	25 June 1847
An Act to render permanent certain Parts of the Act (Note: Newfoundland Act 1842 (5 & 6 Vict. c. 120)) for amending the Constitution of Newfoundland. (Repealed by Statute Law Revision Act 1875 (38 & 39 Vict. c. 66))
Prisoners Removal (Ireland) Act 1847 (repealed)	10 & 11 Vict. c. 45	25 June 1847
An Act to authorize for One Year, and to the End of the then next Session of Parliament, the Removal of Prisoners from the several Gaols in Ireland in Cases of epidemic Diseases. (Repealed by Statute Law Revision Act 1861 (24 & 25 Vict. c. 101))
Settled Land (Ireland) Act 1847	10 & 11 Vict. c. 46	25 June 1847
An Act to facilitate the temporary Investment of Trust Monies in the Improvement of Landed Property in Ireland.
Service of Heirs (Scotland) Act 1847 (repealed)	10 & 11 Vict. c. 47	25 June 1847
An Act to amend the Law and Practice in Scotland as to the Service of Heirs. (Repealed by Titles to Land Consolidation (Scotland) Act 1868 (31 & 32 Vict. c. 101))
Transference of Lands (Scotland) Act 1847 (repealed)	10 & 11 Vict. c. 48	25 June 1847
An Act to facilitate the Transference of Lands and other Heritages in Scotland not held in Burgage Tenure. (Repealed by Titles to Land Consolidation (Scotland) Act 1868 (31 & 32 Vict. c. 101))
Transference of Lands (Scotland) (No. 2) Act 1847 (repealed)	10 & 11 Vict. c. 49	25 June 1847
An Act to facilitate the Transference of Lands and other Heritages in Scotland held in Burgage Tenure. (Repealed by Titles to Land Consolidation (Scotland) Act 1868 (31 & 32 Vict. c. 101))
Heritable Securities (Scotland) Act 1847 (repealed)	10 & 11 Vict. c. 50	25 June 1847
An Act to facilitate the Constitution and Transmission of Heritable Securities for Debt in Scotland, and to render the same more effectual for the Recovery of Debts. (Repealed by Titles to Land Consolidation (Scotland) Act 1868 (31 & 32 Vict. c. 101))
Crown Charters (Scotland) Act 1847 (repealed)	10 & 11 Vict. c. 51	25 June 1847
An Act to amend the Practice in Scotland with regard to Crown Charters and Precepts from Chancery. (Repealed by Titles to Land Consolidation (Scotland) Act 1868 (31 & 32 Vict. c. 101))
Representative Peers (Scotland) Act 1847 (repealed)	10 & 11 Vict. c. 52	25 June 1847
An Act for the Correction of certain Abuses which have frequently prevailed at the Elections of Representative Peers for Scotland. (Repealed by Peerage Act 1963 (c. 48))
Loan Societies Act 1847 (repealed)	10 & 11 Vict. c. 53	25 June 1847
An Act to continue until the First Day of October One thousand eight hundred and forty-eight, and to the End of the then next Session of Parliament, an Act (Note: Loan Societies Act 1840 (3 & 4 Vict. c. 110)) to amend the Laws relating to Loan Societies. (Repealed by Statute Law Revision Act 1875 (38 & 39 Vict. c. 66))
Chelsea and Greenwich Out-pensioners Act 1847 (repealed)	10 & 11 Vict. c. 54	25 June 1847
An Act to amend the Acts for rendering effective the Service of the Chelsea and Greenwich Out-Pensioners. (Repealed by Reserve Force Act 1867 (30 & 31 Vict. c. 110))
Poor Relief (Ireland) (No. 3) Act 1847 (repealed)	10 & 11 Vict. c. 55	25 June 1847
An Act to authorize a further Advance of Money for the Relief of destitute Persons in Ireland. (Repealed by Statute Law Revision Act 1875 (38 & 39 Vict. c. 66))
Port Natal Act 1847 (repealed)	10 & 11 Vict. c. 56	25 June 1847
An Act to make legal the Collection of certain Duties at Port Natal. (Repealed by Statute Law Revision Act 1875 (38 & 39 Vict. c. 66))
Van Diemen's Land Company Act 1847 (repealed)	10 & 11 Vict. c. 57	25 June 1847
An Act to amend an Act passed in the Sixth Year of the Reign of His Majesty King George the Fourth, (Note: Van Diemen's Land Company Act 1825 (6 Geo. 4. c. 39)) for granting certain Powers and Authorities to the Van Diemen's Land Company. (Repealed by Van Diemen's Land Company Act 1979 (c. xi))
Marriages of Jews and Quakers Act 1847 or the Marriages Act 1847 (repealed)	10 & 11 Vict. c. 58	2 July 1847
An Act to remove Doubts as to Quakers and Jews Marriages solemnized before certain Periods. (Repealed by Statute Law (Repeals) Act 1977 (c. 18))
Naval Mutiny Act 1847 (repealed)	10 & 11 Vict. c. 59	2 July 1847
An Act for amending an Act, intituled, "An Act for amending, explaining, and reducing into One Act of Parliament the Laws relating to the Government of His Majesty's Ships, Vessels, and Forces by Sea." (Note: Navy Act 1748 (22 Geo. 2. c. 33)) (Repealed by Naval Discipline Act 1860 (23 & 24 Vict. c. 123))
Masters in Chancery Act 1847 (repealed)	10 & 11 Vict. c. 60	2 July 1847
An Act to abolish One of the Offices of Master in Ordinary of the High Court of Chancery. (Repealed by Statute Law Revision Act 1875 (38 & 39 Vict. c. 66))
Baths and Washhouses Act 1847 (repealed)	10 & 11 Vict. c. 61	2 July 1847
An Act to amend the Act (Note: Baths and Washhouses Act 1846 (9 & 10 Vict. c. 74)) for the Establishment of public Baths and Wash-houses. (Repealed by Public Health Act 1936 (26 Geo. 5 & 1 Edw. 8. c. 49), Public Health (London) Act 1936 (26 Geo. 5 & 1 Edw. 8. c. 50) and City of London (Various Powers) Act 1960 (8 & 9 Eliz. 2. c. xxxvi))
Naval Deserters Act 1847 (repealed)	10 & 11 Vict. c. 62	2 July 1847
An Act for the Establishment of Naval Prisons, and for the Prevention of Desertion from Her Majesty's Navy. (Repealed by Naval Discipline Act 1957 (5 & 6 Eliz. 2. c. 53))
Royal Marines Act 1847 (repealed)	10 & 11 Vict. c. 63	2 July 1847
An Act for limiting the Time of Service in the Royal Marines. (Repealed by Statute Law Revision Act 1875 (38 & 39 Vict. c. 66), Regulation of the Forces Act 1881 (44 & 45 Vict. c. 57) and Revision of the Army and Air Force Acts (Transitional Provisions) Act 1955 (3 & 4 Eliz. 2. c. 20))
Duties on Corn, etc. Act 1847 (repealed)	10 & 11 Vict. c. 64	9 July 1847
An Act to suspend until the First Day of March One thousand eight hundred and forty-eight the Duties on the Importation of Corn, Maize, Rice, Grain, Meal, Flour, Biscuit, and certain other similar Articles. (Repealed by Statute Law Revision Act 1875 (38 & 39 Vict. c. 66))
Cemeteries Clauses Act 1847	10 & 11 Vict. c. 65	9 July 1847
An Act for consolidating in One Act certain Provisions usually contained in Acts authorizing the making of Cemeteries.
Threatening Letters, etc. Act 1847 (repealed)	10 & 11 Vict. c. 66	9 July 1847
An Act for extending the Provisions of the Law respecting Threatening Letters and accusing Parties with a view to extort Money. (Repealed by Criminal Statutes Repeal Act 1861 (24 & 25 Vict. c. 95))
Transportation Act 1847 (repealed)	10 & 11 Vict. c. 67	9 July 1847
An Act to amend the Law as to the Custody of Offenders. (Repealed for England and Wales by Criminal Justice Act 1948 (11 & 12 Geo. 6. c. 58) and for Scotland by Criminal Justice (Scotland) Act 1949 (12, 13 & 14 Geo. 6. c. 94))
Militia Ballots Suspension Act 1847 (repealed)	10 & 11 Vict. c. 68	22 July 1847
An Act to suspend until the First Day of October One thousand eight hundred and forty-eight the making of Lists and the Ballots and Enrolments for the Militia of the United Kingdom. (Repealed by Statute Law Revision Act 1875 (38 & 39 Vict. c. 66))
House of Commons Costs Taxation Act 1847 (repealed)	10 & 11 Vict. c. 69	22 July 1847
An Act for the more effectual Taxation of Costs on Private Bills in the House of Commons. (Repealed by Parliamentary Costs Act 2006 (c. 37))
Print Works Act 1847 (repealed)	10 & 11 Vict. c. 70	22 July 1847
An Act to amend the Law as to the School Attendance of Children employed in Print Works. (Repealed by Factory and Workshop Act 1870 (33 & 34 Vict. c. 62))
Canada Civil List Act 1847 (repealed)	10 & 11 Vict. c. 71	22 July 1847
An Act to authorize Her Majesty to assent to a certain Bill of the Legislative Council and Assembly of the Province of Canada, for granting a Civil List to Her Majesty; and to repeal certain Parts of an Act for re-uniting the Provinces of Upper and Lower Canada, and for the Government of Canada. (Repealed by Statute Law Revision Act 1875 (38 & 39 Vict. c. 66))
South Wales Turnpike Roads Act 1847 (repealed)	10 & 11 Vict. c. 72	22 July 1847
An Act for the further Amendment of the Laws relating to Turnpike Roads in South Wales. (Repealed by Statute Law (Repeals) Act 1993 (c. 50))
Advances for Railways (Ireland) Act 1847 (repealed)	10 & 11 Vict. c. 73	22 July 1847
An Act to authorize the Advance of Money out of the Consolidated Fund for Loans towards defraying the Expence of making certain Railways in Ireland. (Repealed by Statute Law Revision Act 1875 (38 & 39 Vict. c. 66))
Shannon Navigation Act 1847 (repealed)	10 & 11 Vict. c. 74	22 July 1847
An Act to provide for the Repayment of Sums due by the County of the City of Limerick for Advances of public Money for the Improvement of the Navigation of the River Shannon. (Repealed by Statute Law Revision Act 1875 (38 & 39 Vict. c. 66))
Piers and Harbours (Ireland) Act 1847 (repealed)	10 & 11 Vict. c. 75	22 July 1847
An Act for the further Improvement of the Fishery Piers and Harbours of Ireland. (Repealed by Statute Law Revision Act 1875 (38 & 39 Vict. c. 66))
Holyhead Harbour Act 1847	10 & 11 Vict. c. 76	22 July 1847
An Act to empower the Commissioners of Her Majesty's Woods to purchase Lands for the Purpose of a Harbour of Refuge at or near Holyhead in the County of Anglesea.
Poor Rates Act 1847 (repealed)	10 & 11 Vict. c. 77	22 July 1847
An Act to continue until the First Day of October One thousand eight hundred and forty-eight, and to the End of the then next Session of Parliament, the Exemption of Inhabitants of Parishes, Townships, and Villages from Liability to be rated as such in respect of Stock in Trade or other Property to the Relief of the Poor. (Repealed by Statute Law Revision Act 1875 (38 & 39 Vict. c. 66))
Joint Stock Companies Act 1847 (repealed)	10 & 11 Vict. c. 78	22 July 1847
An Act to amend an Act for the Registration, Incorporation, and Regulation of Joint Stock Companies. (Repealed by Companies Act 1862 (25 & 26 Vict. c. 89))
Drainage (Ireland) Act 1847 (repealed)	10 & 11 Vict. c. 79	22 July 1847
An Act to continue for a limited Time the Provisions for summary Proceedings contained in an Act (Note: Drainage (Ireland) Act 1846 (9 & 10 Vict. c. 4)) of the last Session to amend the Acts for promoting the Drainage of Lands, and for other Purposes; and to amend the said Act. (Repealed by Erne Drainage and Development Act (Northern Ireland) 1950 (c. 15 (N.I.)))
Employment of Poor, etc. (Ireland) Act 1847 (repealed)	10 & 11 Vict. c. 80	22 July 1847
An Act to amend an Act (Note: Poor Employment (Ireland) Act 1846 (9 & 10 Vict. c. 107)) of the last Session, for facilitating the Employment of the labouring Poor in the distressed Districts in Ireland, so far as relates to Compensation for Damages. (Repealed by Statute Law Revision Act 1875 (38 & 39 Vict. c. 66))
Polling at Elections (Ireland) Act 1847 (repealed)	10 & 11 Vict. c. 81	22 July 1847
An Act to limit the Time for taking the Poll at Elections of Members to serve in Parliament for Counties of Cities, Counties of Towns, and Boroughs in Ireland. (Repealed by Parliamentary Elections (Ireland) Act 1850 (13 & 14 Vict. c. 68))
Juvenile Offenders Act 1847 (repealed)	10 & 11 Vict. c. 82	22 July 1847
An Act for the more speedy Trial and Punishment of Juvenile Offenders. (Repealed by Summary Jurisdiction Act 1879 (42 & 43 Vict. c. 49))
Aliens Act 1847 (repealed)	10 & 11 Vict. c. 83	22 July 1847
An Act for the Naturalization of Aliens. (Repealed by Naturalization Act 1870 (33 & 34 Vict. c. 14))
Vagrancy (Ireland) Act 1847	10 & 11 Vict. c. 84	22 July 1847
An Act to make Provision for the Punishment of Vagrants and Persons offending against the Laws in force for the Relief of the destitute Poor in Ireland.
Post Office (Duties) Act 1847 (repealed)	10 & 11 Vict. c. 85	22 July 1847
An Act for giving further Facilities for the Transmission of Letters by Post, and for the regulating the Duties of Postage thereon, and for other Purposes relating to the Post Office. (Repealed by Post Office Act 1953 (1 & 2 Eliz. 2. c. 36))
Importation Act 1847 (repealed)	10 & 11 Vict. c. 86	22 July 1847
An Act to allow until the First Day of March One thousand eight hundred and forty-eight the Importation of Corn, Maize, Bice, Grain, Potatoes, Meal, Flour, Biscuit, and certain other similar Articles, from any Country, in any Ships. (Repealed by Statute Law Revision Act 1875 (38 & 39 Vict. c. 66))
Employment of Poor Act 1847 (repealed)	10 & 11 Vict. c. 87	22 July 1847
An Act to facilitate the Recovery of Public Monies advanced for the Relief of Distress in Ireland by the Employment of the labouring Poor. (Repealed by Statute Law Revision Act 1875 (38 & 39 Vict. c. 66))
Militia Pay Act 1847 (repealed)	10 & 11 Vict. c. 88	22 July 1847
An Act to defray until the First Day of August One thousand eight hundred and forty-eight the Charge of the Pay, Clothing and contingent and other Expences of the Disembodied Militia in Great Britain and Ireland; to grant Allowances in certain Cases to Subaltern Officers, Adjutants, Paymasters, Quartermasters, Surgeons, Assistant Surgeons, Surgeons Mates, and Serjeant Majors of the Militia; and to authorize the Employment of the Non-commissioned Officers. (Repealed by Statute Law Revision Act 1875 (38 & 39 Vict. c. 66))
Town Police Clauses Act 1847	10 & 11 Vict. c. 89	22 July 1847
An Act for consolidating in One Act certain Provisions usually contained in Acts for regulating the Police of Towns.
Poor Relief (Ireland) (No. 2) Act 1847	10 & 11 Vict. c. 90	22 July 1847
An Act to provide for the Execution of the Laws for Relief of the Poor in Ireland.
Manufactures Improvement Fund (Scotland) Act 1847 (repealed)	10 & 11 Vict. c. 91	22 July 1847
An Act to increase the Number of Trustees for the Herring Fishery, and to direct the Application of the Funds granted for the Promotion of Manufactures and Improvements, in Scotland. (Repealed by National Galleries of Scotland Act 1906 (6 Edw. 7. c. 50))
Mussel Fisheries (Scotland) Act 1847	10 & 11 Vict. c. 92	22 July 1847
An Act for the Protection of Mussel Fisheries in Scotland.
Highway Rates Act 1847 (repealed)	10 & 11 Vict. c. 93	22 July 1847
An Act to continue until the First Day of October One thousand eight hundred and forty-eight, and to the End of the then next Session of Parliament, an Act (Note: Application of Highway Rates to Turnpikes Act 1841 (4 & 5 Vict. c. 59)) for authorizing the Application of Highway Bates to Turnpike Roads. (Repealed by Statute Law Revision Act 1875 (38 & 39 Vict. c. 66))
Canal (Carriers) Act 1847	10 & 11 Vict. c. 94	22 July 1847
An Act to amend an Act (Note: Canal Carriers Act 1845 (8 & 9 Vict. c. 42)) to enable Canal Companies to become Carriers upon their Canals.
Colonial Copyright Act 1847 (repealed)	10 & 11 Vict. c. 95	22 July 1847
An Act to amend the Law relating to the Protection in the Colonies of Works entitled to Copyright in the United Kingdom. (Repealed by Copyright Act 1911 (1 & 2 Geo. 5. c. 46))
Trustees Relief Act 1847 (repealed)	10 & 11 Vict. c. 96	22 July 1847
An Act for better securing Trust Funds, and for the Relief of Trustees. (Repealed by Trustee Act 1893 (56 & 57 Vict. c. 53))
Masters in Chancery (No. 2) Act 1847 (repealed)	10 & 11 Vict. c. 97	22 July 1847
An Act for the Discontinuance of the Attendance of the Masters in Ordinary of the High Court of Chancery in the Public Office, and for transferring the Business of such Public Office to the Affidavit Office in Chancery. (Repealed by Statute Law Revision Act 1875 (38 & 39 Vict. c. 66))
Ecclesiastical Jurisdiction Act 1847 (repealed)	10 & 11 Vict. c. 98	22 July 1847
An Act to amend the Law as to Ecclesiastical Jurisdiction in England. (Repealed by Church of England (Miscellaneous Provisions) Measure 1992 (No. 1))
Poor Relief (Ireland) (No. 4) Act 1847 (repealed)	10 & 11 Vict. c. 99	22 July 1847
An Act to authorize a further Advance of Money for the Relief of destitute Persons in Ireland. (Repealed by Statute Law Revision Act 1875 (38 & 39 Vict. c. 66))
Irish Constabulary Act 1847 (repealed)	10 & 11 Vict. c. 100	22 July 1847
An Act to regulate the Superannuation Allowances of the Constabulary Force in Ireland and the Dublin Metropolitan Police. (Repealed by Statute Law Revision Act 1875 (38 & 39 Vict. c. 66), Statute Law Revision Act 1894 (57 & 58 Vict. c. 56) and Statute Law Revision Act (Northern Ireland) 1954 (c. 35 (N.I.)))
Copyhold Commission Act 1847 (repealed)	10 & 11 Vict. c. 101	22 July 1847
An Act to continue the Copyhold Commission until the First Day of October One thousand eight hundred and fifty, and to the End of the then next Session of Parliament. (Repealed by Statute Law Revision Act 1875 (38 & 39 Vict. c. 66))
Bankruptcy, etc. Act 1847 (repealed)	10 & 11 Vict. c. 102	22 July 1847
An Act to abolish the Court of Review in Bankruptcy, and to make Alterations in the Jurisdiction of the Courts of Bankruptcy and Court for Relief of Insolvent Debtors. (Repealed by Bankruptcy Repeal and Insolvent Court Act 1869 (32 & 33 Vict. c. 83))
Passenger Act 1847 (repealed)	10 & 11 Vict. c. 103	22 July 1847
An Act to amend the Passengers Act, (Note: Passengers in Merchant Ships Act 1842 (5 & 6 Vict. c. 107)) and to make further Provision for the Carriage of Passengers by Sea. (Repealed by Passengers Act 1849 (12 & 13 Vict. c. 33))
Tithe Act 1847 (repealed)	10 & 11 Vict. c. 104	22 July 1847
An Act to explain the Acts for the Commutation of Tithes in England and Wales, and to continue the Officers appointed under the said Acts until the First Day of October One thousand eight hundred and fifty, and to the End of the then next Session of Parliament. (Repealed by Statute Law (Repeals) Act 1998 (c. 43))
Turnpike Acts (Great Britain) Act 1847 (repealed)	10 & 11 Vict. c. 105	22 July 1847
An Act to continue until the First Day of October One thousand eight hundred and forty-eight, and to the End of the then next Session of Parliament, certain Turnpike Acts. (Repealed by Statute Law Revision Act 1875 (38 & 39 Vict. c. 66))
Drainage, etc. (Ireland) Act 1847 (repealed)	10 & 11 Vict. c. 106	22 July 1847
An Act to provide additional Funds for Loans for Drainage and other Works of public Utility in Ireland, and to repeal an Act of the last Session, (Note: Public Works Advances (Ireland) Act 1846 (9 & 10 Vict. c. 109)) for authorizing a further Issue of Money in aid of Public Works of acknowledged Utility. (Repealed by Statute Law Revision Act 1875 (38 & 39 Vict. c. 66))
Appropriation Act 1847 (repealed)	10 & 11 Vict. c. 107	23 July 1847
An Act to apply a Sum out of the Consolidated Fund and certain other Sums, to the Service of the Year One thousand eight hundred and forty-seven; and to appropriate the Supplies granted in this Session of Parliament. (Repealed by Statute Law Revision Act 1875 (38 & 39 Vict. c. 66))
Ecclesiastical Commissioners Act 1847 or the Bishopric of Manchester Act 1847 (repealed)	10 & 11 Vict. c. 108	23 July 1847
An Act for establishing the Bishoprick of Manchester, and amending certain Acts relating to the Ecclesiastical Commissioners for England. (Repealed by Statute Law (Repeals) Act 1973 (c. 39))
Poor Law Board Act 1847 (repealed)	10 & 11 Vict. c. 109	23 July 1847
An Act for the Administration of the Laws for Relief of the Poor in England. (Repealed by Poor Law Act 1927 (17 & 18 Geo. 5. c. 14))
Poor Removal (No. 2) Act 1847 (repealed)	10 & 11 Vict. c. 110	23 July 1847
An Act to amend the Laws relating to the Removal of the Poor, until the First Day of October One thousand eight hundred and forty-eight. (Repealed by Statute Law Revision Act 1875 (38 & 39 Vict. c. 66))
Inclosure Act 1847	10 & 11 Vict. c. 111	23 July 1847
An Act to extend the Provisions of the Act (Note: Inclosure Act 1845 (8 & 9 Vict. c. 118)) for the Inclosure and Improvement of Commons.
New Zealand Act 1847 (repealed)	10 & 11 Vict. c. 112	23 July 1847
An Act to promote Colonization in New Zealand, and to authorize a Loan to the New Zealand Company. (Repealed by Statute Law Revision Act 1894 (57 & 58 Vict. c. 56))
Land Drainage (Scotland) Act 1847 (repealed)	10 & 11 Vict. c. 113	23 July 1847
An Act to facilitate the Drainage of Lands in Scotland. (Repealed by Land Drainage (Scotland) Act 1930 (20 & 21 Geo. 5. c. 20))
Leith Harbour and Docks Act 1847 (repealed)	10 & 11 Vict. c. 114	23 July 1847
An Act for improving the Harbour and Docks of Leith. (Repealed by Statute Law Revision Act 1894 (57 & 58 Vict. c. 56))
London Bridge Approaches Fund Act 1847	10 & 11 Vict. c. 115	23 July 1847
An Act to vary the Priorities of the Charges made on "The London Bridge Approaches Fund."

=== Local acts ===
Short title	Citation	Royal assent
Long title
General Life and Fire Assurance Company Act 1847	10 & 11 Vict. c. i	18 March 1847
An Act to change the Name of the Protestant Dissenters and General Life and Fire Insurance Company to the General Life and Fire Assurance Company, and to extend to the Company, by its new Name, the Powers of the Act (Note: Protestant Dissenters and General Life and Fire Insurance Company Act 1840 (3 & 4 Vict. c. xx)) enabling the Company to sue and be sued in the Name of the Chairman, Deputy Chairman, or any One of the Directors or of the Secretary of the Company.
Llynvi Iron Company Act 1847	10 & 11 Vict. c. ii	30 March 1847
An Act for regulating Proceedings by or against "The Llynvi Iron Company," and for granting certain Powers thereto.
Whiteburn and Kelso Road (Berwick) Act 1847	10 & 11 Vict. c. iii	30 March 1847
An Act for the continued Repair and Maintenance of the Road from or near Whiteburn in the County of Berwick to the Town of Kelso in the County of Roxburgh; and to authorize the Transfer of a Portion of the said Road to the Trustees of the Road from Lauder, to and through Kelso, to the Marchburn.
District Fire Insurance Company Act 1847	10 & 11 Vict. c. iv	23 April 1847
An Act for incorporating the District Fire Insurance Company of Birmingham, by the Name of "The District Fire Insurance Company"; for enabling the said Company to sue and be sued; and for other Purposes relating to the said Company.
Shipley Gas Light Act 1847 (repealed)	10 & 11 Vict. c. v	27 April 1847
An Act for lighting with Gas the Township of Shipley, the Village of Windhill, and the Neighbourhood thereof, in the West Riding of the County of York. (Repealed by Shipley Gaslight Act 1853 (16 & 17 Vict. c. xliii))
Pile Pier Act 1847 (repealed)	10 & 11 Vict. c. vi	11 May 1847
An Act for extending and enlarging a certain Pier in Pile Harbour in the Parish of Dalton-in-Furness in the County Palatine of Lancaster, and to alter the Act (Note: Pile Pier Act 1843 (6 & 7 Vict. c. xlii)) relating thereto. (Repealed by Furness Railway Act 1855 (18 & 19 Vict. c. clxxiii))
Ipswich Gas Act 1847	10 & 11 Vict. c. vii	11 May 1847
An Act to alter, amend and enlarge the Powers and Provisions of an Act passed in the Second Year of the Reign of His late Majesty King George the Fourth, intituled "An Act for lighting with Gas the Town and Borough of Ipswich in the County of Suffolk." (Note: Ipswich Gas Act 1821 (1 & 2 Geo. 4. c. lxxvi))
Cheltenham Waterworks Company Act 1847	10 & 11 Vict. c. viii	11 May 1847
An Act for authorizing the Cheltenham Waterworks Company to raise a further Sum of Money.
Newhaven Harbour and Ouse Lower Navigation Act 1847 or the Newhaven Harbour and Ouse Harbour Navigation Act 1847	10 & 11 Vict. c. ix	8 June 1847
An Act for more effectually maintaining the Harbour of Newhaven and the Navigation of the River Ouse between Newhaven and Lewes, and for draining the Low Lands lying in Lewes and Laughton Levels, all in the County of Sussex.
Ayrshire and Galloway (Smithstown and Dalmellington) Railway Act 1847	10 & 11 Vict. c. x	8 June 1847
An Act for making a Railway from Smithstown to Dalmellington in the County of Ayr.
Colchester, Stour Valley, Sudbury and Halstead Railway Act 1847	10 & 11 Vict. c. xi	8 June 1847
An Act to enable the Colchester, Stour Valley, Sudbury, and Halstead Railway Company to make an Extension of their Railway from Sudbury to Melford, Lavenham, and Clare, in the County of Suffolk.
Newmarket and Chesterford Railway (Bury Extension and Ely Branch) Act 1847 (repealed)	10 & 11 Vict. c. xii	8 June 1847
An Act to enable the Newmarket and Chesterford Railway Company to extend their Line of Railway to Bury Saint Edmunds, with a Branch to the City of Ely. (Repealed by Great Eastern Railway Act 1862 (25 & 26 Vict. c. ccxxiii))
Newmarket and Chesterford Railway Act 1847 (repealed)	10 & 11 Vict. c. xiii	8 June 1847
An Act for repealing certain Provisions of the Newmarket and Chesterford Railway Act, 1846. (Note: Newmarket and Chesterford Railway Act 1846 (9 & 10 Vict. c. clxxii)) (Repealed by Great Eastern Railway Act 1862 (25 & 26 Vict. c. ccxxiii))
Manchester Markets Act 1847 (repealed)	10 & 11 Vict. c. xiv	8 June 1847
An Act to amend some of the Provisions of the Manchester Markets Act, 1846. (Note: Manchester Market Act 1846 (9 & 10 Vict. c. ccxix)) (Repealed by Greater Manchester Act 1981 (c. ix))
Wolverhampton Gas Act 1847 (repealed)	10 & 11 Vict. c. xv	8 June 1847
An Act to enlarge the Powers of "The Wolverhampton Gaslight Company," and to authorize the Union of such Company with "The Wolverhampton New Gas Company." (Repealed by Wolverhampton Gas Act 1852 (15 & 16 Vict. c. iv))
Hartlepool West Harbour and Dock Act 1847	10 & 11 Vict. c. xvi	8 June 1847
An Act to enable the Hartlepool West Harbour and Dock Company to construct additional Docks; and for repealing an Act passed in the Seventh Year of the Reign of Her present Majesty, (Note: Hartlepool West Harbour and Dock Act 1844 (7 & 8 Vict. c. xxviii)) relating to the said Hartlepool West Harbour and Dock Company, and for granting new Powers and Provisions in lieu thereof.
Bolton Improvement Act 1847 (repealed)	10 & 11 Vict. c. xvii	8 June 1847
An Act to enable the Mayor, Aldermen, and Burgesses of the Borough of Bolton in the County of Lancaster to improve such Borough, and to take a Lease of and to purchase the Works of the Bolton Waterworks Company. (Repealed by Bolton Improvement Act 1854 (17 & 18 Vict. c. clix))
Colchester, Stour Valley, Sudbury and Halstead Railway (Extension) (Railway from Lavenham to Bury St. Edmunds) Act 1847	10 & 11 Vict. c. xviii	8 June 1847
An Act to enable the Colchester, Stour Valley, Sudbury, and Halstead Railway Company to make an Extension Railway from Lavenham to Bury Saint Edmunds in the County of Suffolk.
Eastern Union and Hadleigh Junction Railway Sale Act 1847	10 & 11 Vict. c. xix	8 June 1847
An Act for authorizing the Sale of the Eastern Union and Hadleigh Junction Railway to the Eastern Union Railway Company.
Newmarket and Chesterford (Thetford Extension) Railway Act 1847 (repealed)	10 & 11 Vict. c. xx	8 June 1847
An Act to enable the Newmarket and Chesterford Railway Company to extend their Line of Railway to Thetford in the County of Norfolk. (Repealed by Great Eastern Railway Act 1862 (25 & 26 Vict. c. ccxxiii))
Colchester, Stour Valley, Sudbury and Halstead Railway Lease Act 1847	10 & 11 Vict. c. xxi	8 June 1847
An Act to enable the Colchester, Stour Valley, Sudbury, and Halstead Railway Company to grant a Lease of their Undertaking to the Ipswich and Bury Saint Edmunds Railway Company.
Caledonian Railway (Motherwell Branch Extension) Act 1847	10 & 11 Vict. c. xxii	8 June 1847
An Act to enable the Caledonian Railway Company to make an Extension of the Motherwell Branch of the Clydesdale Junction Railway to Auchinheath Mineral Field, with Branches therefrom.
Caledonian Railway (Branches to Wilsontown, Fauldhouse, Biggar, and Broughton) Act 1847	10 & 11 Vict. c. xxiii	8 June 1847
An Act to enable the Caledonian Railway Company to make Branch Railways to Wilsontown, to Fauldhouse, and to Biggar and Broughton.
Caledonian Railway (Lesmahagow Branches) Act 1847	10 & 11 Vict. c. xxiv	8 June 1847
An Act to enable the Caledonian Railway Company to make Branches from the Clydesdale Junction Railway to the Douglas and Lesmahagow Mineral Fields, and to Strathavon.
Leith Harbour Act 1847 (repealed)	10 & 11 Vict. c. xxv	8 June 1847
An Act to abolish, reduce, equalize, and consolidate the Rates and Duties leviable at the Harbour and Docks of Leith. (Repealed by Leith Harbour and Docks Act 1875 (38 & 39 Vict. c. clx))
Rochdale Waterworks Act 1847	10 & 11 Vict. c. xxvi	8 June 1847
An Act for better supplying with Water the Inhabitants of the Town and Borough of Rochdale, and of several Townships and Places, all in the Parish of Rochdale in the County of Lancaster.
Bristol and Clifton Gaslight Act 1847	10 & 11 Vict. c. xxvii	8 June 1847
An Act for granting further Powers to the Bristol and Clifton Oil Gas Company.
Inverness Gas and Water Act 1847	10 & 11 Vict. c. xxviii	8 June 1847
An Act for better supplying with Gas and Water the Royal Burgh of Inverness, Suburbs, and Places adjacent.
Ryde Improvement Act 1847 (repealed)	10 & 11 Vict. c. xxix	8 June 1847
An Act for amending the Ryde Improvement Act. (Note: Ryde Improvement and Market Act 1829 (10 Geo. 4. c. xxxix)) (Repealed by Ryde Improvement Act 1854 (17 & 18 Vict. c. lxxxiii))
Wolverhampton Rates Act 1847 (repealed)	10 & 11 Vict. c. xxx	8 June 1847
An Act for better assessing the Poor Rates, Highway Rates, County and Police Rates, and other Parochial and Local Rates, on small Tenements in the several Townships of Wolverhampton, Bilston, Willenhall, and Wednesfield, in the County of Stafford. (Repealed by Wolverhampton Corporation Act 1926 (16 & 17 Geo. 5. c. cvi))
Shipowners' Towing Company Act 1847	10 & 11 Vict. c. xxxi	8 June 1847
An Act to enable the Shipowners Towing Company to sue and be sued.
Dunfermline and Cupar Court Houses Act 1847 (repealed)	10 & 11 Vict. c. xxxii	8 June 1847
An Act to alter and amend an Act, intituled "An Act for providing in or near the Burgh of Cupar more extensive Accommodation for holding the Courts and Meetings of the Sheriff, Justices of the Peace, and Commissioners of Supply of the County of Fife; and for the Custody of the Records of the said County;" (Note: Cupar Judicial Accommodation Act 1835 (5 & 6 Will. 4. c. lx)) and to authorize the Commissioners acting under the Authority of that Act to provide a Court House at Dunfermline for the Accommodation of the Courts of the Sheriff and Justices of the Peace in the Western District of the said County. (Repealed by Local Government (Scotland) Act 1889 (52 & 53 Vict. c. 50))
Kingston-upon-Thames Small Tenements Act 1847	10 & 11 Vict. c. xxxiii	8 June 1847
An Act for better assessing and collecting the Poor, Church, and Highway Rates within the Parish of Kingston-upon-Thames in the County of Surrey.
Scottish Union Insurance Company Act 1847 (repealed)	10 & 11 Vict. c. xxxiv	8 June 1847
An Act to enable the Scottish Union Insurance Company to purchase Annuities and invest Money on Securities in England and Ireland; and for other Purposes relating thereto. (Repealed by Statute Law (Repeals) Act 1998 (c. 43))
Scottish Equitable Life Assurance Society Act 1847 (repealed)	10 & 11 Vict. c. xxxv	8 June 1847
An Act for incorporating the Scottish Equitable Life Assurance Society, for confirming the Rules and Regulations thereof, for enabling the said Society to sue and be sued, to take and to hold Property; and for other Purposes relating thereto. (Repealed by Scottish Equitable Life Assurance Society Act 1902 (2 Edw. 7. c. xxxviii))
Claridge's Patent Asphalt Company Act 1847 or the Claridge's Patent Asphalte Company Act 1847	10 & 11 Vict. c. xxxvi	8 June 1847
An Act for regulating legal Proceedings by or against "Claridge's Patent Asphalte Company," and for granting certain Powers thereto.
Bridge House Estates Debt Act 1847	10 & 11 Vict. c. xxxvii	21 June 1847
An Act to enable the Mayor and Commonality and Citizens of the City of London to raise a Sum of Money for paying off the Monies now charged on the Bridge House Estates by Authority of Parliament, and to raise further Monies upon the Credit of the said Estates, and of their own Estates and Revenues, for effecting Public Works and Improvements in and near the said City.
Metropolitan Sewerage Manure Amendment Act 1847	10 & 11 Vict. c. xxxviii	21 June 1847
An Act for enabling the Metropolitan Sewerage Manure Company to alter the Line of their Works, and for other Purposes.
Aberdeen Harbour Amendment Act 1847	10 & 11 Vict. c. xxxix	21 June 1847
An Act to authorize the Purchase by the Aberdeen Railway Company of a Piece of Ground at the upper part of The Inches, and upper part of the Harbour of Aberdeen, now vested in the Aberdeen Harbour Commissioners, and to enable such Commissioners to make certain Alterations and New Works connected with such Works.
Runcorn Gas Act 1847 (repealed)	10 & 11 Vict. c. xl	21 June 1847
An Act for better lighting with Gas the Town of Runcorn, otherwise called Higher Runcorn and Lower Runcorn, and also certain Townships and Hamlets in the Vicinity. (Repealed by Cheshire County Council Act 1980 (c. xiii))
Bingley Gas Act 1847 (repealed)	10 & 11 Vict. c. xli	21 June 1847
An Act for lighting with Gas the Town and Neighbourhood of Bingley, in the West Riding of the County of York. (Repealed by West Yorkshire Act 1980 (c. xiv))
Alliance and Dublin Consumers Gas Act 1847 (repealed)	10 & 11 Vict. c. xlii	21 June 1847
An Act for rendering more efficient the Dublin Consumers Gas Company. (Repealed by Alliance and Dublin Gas Act 1866 (29 & 30 Vict. c. ccv))
Imperial Continental Gas Association Act 1847 (repealed)	10 & 11 Vict. c. xliii	21 June 1847
An Act for extending the Powers of the Imperial Continental Gas Association. (Repealed by Imperial Continental Gas Association Act 1853 (16 & 17 Vict. c. cxc))
Warrington Gas Act 1847 (repealed)	10 & 11 Vict. c. xliv	21 June 1847
An Act to amend and extend the Provisions of an Act passed in the Third year of the reign of King George the Fourth, intituled, "An Act for incorporating the Warrington Gas Light Company." (Note: Warrington Gas Act 1822 (3 Geo. 4. c. xxxv)) (Repealed by Cheshire County Council Act 1980 (c. xiii))
Sheffield Markets Act 1847 (repealed)	10 & 11 Vict. c. xlv	21 June 1847
An Act for removing the Market between King-street and Castle-street, in the Town of Sheffield, and for providing a new Market-place in lieu thereof, and for regulating and maintaining the Markets and Fairs of the said Town. (Repealed by Sheffield Corporation (Consolidation) Act 1918 (8 & 9 Geo. 5. c. lxi))
Elwell Rates Act 1847 (repealed)	10 & 11 Vict. c. xlvi	21 June 1847
An Act for better and more effectually ascertaining, assessing, collecting and levying the Poor Rate and all other Rates and Assessments in the Parish of Ewell, in the County of Surrey, and for the better Management of the Business and Affairs of the said Parish, and for other Purposes relating thereto. (Repealed by Statute Law (Repeals) Act 2008 (c. 12))
Plymouth and Tavistock Turnpike Roads Act 1847	10 & 11 Vict. c. xlvii	21 June 1847
An Act for repealing the Acts relating to the Roads leading from the Lower Market-house in Tavistock, to Old Town Gate, in the Borough of Plymouth, and from Manadon Gate to the Old Pound, near Devonport, in the County of Devon, and making other Provisions in lieu thereof.
Edinburgh Markets Act 1847 (repealed)	10 & 11 Vict. c. xlviii	21 June 1847
An Act to enlarge and improve the Meal, Corn and Grain Markets of the City of Edinburgh, and for other Purposes in relation thereto. (Repealed by Edinburgh Corporation Order Confirmation Act 1933 (24 & 25 Geo. 5. c. v))
Wakefield Borough Market Act 1847	10 & 11 Vict. c. xlix	21 June 1847
An Act for establishing a Market and Marketplace in the Town and Borough of Wakefield.
Waterford Road Act 1847	10 & 11 Vict. c. l	21 June 1847
An Act to repeal the Waterford Road Act. (Note: Cork and Waterford Roads Act 1830 (11 Geo. 4 & 1 Will. 4. c. cvii))
Glasgow and Shotts Road Act 1847	10 & 11 Vict. c. li	21 June 1847
An Act for the better Maintenance, Improvement and Repair of the Glasgow and Shotts Turnpike roads.
Belfast Harbour Act 1847	10 & 11 Vict. c. lii	21 June 1847
An Act for the Amendment of the Port and Harbour Acts of Belfast, for making further Improvements and New Works there, and for the Amendment of the Belfast and Cavehill Railway and Belfast Town Improvement Acts.
Commercial Gas Act 1847 (repealed)	10 & 11 Vict. c. liii	21 June 1847
An Act for incorporating the Commercial Gas Light and Coke Company. (Repealed by Commercial Gas Act 1852 (15 & 16 Vict. c. clv))
Darwen Waterworks and Reservoirs Act 1847 (repealed)	10 & 11 Vict. c. liv	21 June 1847
An Act for better supplying with Water the Town and Neighbourhood of Over Darwen, in the County Reservoirs of Lancaster, and for affording a more regular and constant Supply of Water to the Millowners and others on the River Darwen. (Repealed by Darwen Waterworks Act 1869 (32 & 33 Vict. c. xliii))
London Sewage Chemical Manure Act 1847	10 & 11 Vict. c. lv	21 June 1847
An Act to incorporate a Company by the name of the London Sewage Chemical Manure Company.
British American Land Company Act 1847	10 & 11 Vict. c. lvi	25 June 1847
An Act for amending an Act passed in the fourth year of the reign of his late Majesty King William the Fourth, intituled, "An Act for granting certain Powers to the British American Land Company," (Note: British American Land Company Act 1834 (4 & 5 Will. 4. c. xv)) and for granting further Powers to the said Company.
Windsor, Staines, and South-western Railway Act (No. 2) 1847 or the Windsor, Staines and South Western Railway (No. 2) Act 1847	10 & 11 Vict. c. lvii	25 June 1847
An Act for making a Railway from Staines to join the London and South-western Railway, near Farnborough, with a Branch to Chertsey.
Windsor, Staines, and South-western Railway Act (No. 1) 1847 or the Windsor, Staines and South Western Railway (No. 1) Act 1847	10 & 11 Vict. c. lviii	25 June 1847
An Act for making a Railway from Richmond to Windsor, with a Loop Line through Brentford and Hounslow.
Cork, Blackrock and Passage Railway, Extension to Monkstown and Amendment Act 1847	10 & 11 Vict. c. lix	25 June 1847
An Act to authorize an Extension of the Cork, Blackrock and Passage Railway to Monkstown, and to amend the Act (Note: Cork, Blackrock and Passage Railway Act 1846 (9 & 10 Vict. c. cxlviii)) relating thereto.
Wilts, Somerset and Weymouth Railway Deviation Act 1847	10 & 11 Vict. c. lx	25 June 1847
An Act to authorize certain Alterations of the Line of the Wilts, Somerset, and Weymouth Railway.
Waterford, Wexford and Wicklow Railway Act 1847	10 & 11 Vict. c. lxi	25 June 1847
An Act to authorize certain Alterations of the Line of the Waterford, Wexford and Wicklow Railway, and to amend the Act (Note: Waterford, Wexford, Wicklow and Dublin Railway Act 1846 (9 & 10 Vict. c. ccviii)) relating thereto.
Liskeard and Caradon Railway Amendment Act 1847	10 & 11 Vict. c. lxii	25 June 1847
An Act to enable the Liskeard and Caradon Railway Company to raise a further Sum of Money.
Killarney and Valencia Railway Act 1847	10 & 11 Vict. c. lxiii	25 June 1847
An Act for making a Railway from the Town of Killarney, in the County of Kerry, to the Harbour of Valencia, in the same County.
Norfolk Railway, Reedham and Diss Branches Act 1847 (repealed)	10 & 11 Vict. c. lxiv	25 June 1847
An Act to empower the Norfolk Railway Company to make a Railway from the Lowestoft Railway, near Reedham, to join the Norwich Extension of the Ipswich and Bury Saint Edmund's Railway, near Diss, with a Branch therefrom to Halesworth. (Repealed by Great Eastern Railway Act 1862 (25 & 26 Vict. c. ccxxiii))
Dundalk and Enniskillen Railway Act 1847	10 & 11 Vict. c. lxv	25 June 1847
An Act to alter and amend several of the Powers and Provisions of the Act (Note: Dundalk and Enniskillen Railway Act 1845 (8 & 9 Vict. c. xcvi)) relating to the Dundalk and Enniskillen Railway.
King's Norton, Northfield, Beoley, Edgbaston and Harborne Rates Act 1847 (repealed)	10 & 11 Vict. c. lxvi	25 June 1847
An Act for rating to the Relief of the Poor, and other Parochial and Local Rates, the Owners of certain Property within the Parishes of King's Norton, Northfield and Beoley, in the County of Worcester, Edgbaston, in the County of Warwick, and Harborne, in the County of Stafford, in lieu of the Occupiers thereof. (Repealed by Local Government Board's Provisional Order Confirmation (No. 13) Act 1891 (54 & 55 Vict. c. clxi))
Liverpool Gaslight Company Act 1847 (repealed)	10 & 11 Vict. c. lxvii	25 June 1847
An Act to repeal two several Acts relating to the Liverpool Gas Light Company, and to substitute other Provisions in lieu thereof, and to enable the said Company to raise a further Sum of Money. (Repealed by Liverpool United Gaslight Company's Act 1848 (11 & 12 Vict. c. xxxviii))
Weymouth and Melcombe Regis Harbour and Bridge Act 1847 (repealed)	10 & 11 Vict. c. lxviii	25 June 1847
An Act for reducing the Dues of the Harbour of the Borough and Town of Weymouth and Melcombe Regis, in the County of Dorset, and consolidating the Trusts created by the Acts relating to such Harbour and the Bridge of the said Borough, and for other Purposes. (Repealed by Weymouth and Melcombe Regis Bridge Act 1879 (42 & 43 Vict. c. xii))
Ross and Cromartyshire District Roads Act 1847 (repealed)	10 & 11 Vict. c. lxix	25 June 1847
An Act to amend certain Acts for making and maintaining Roads, and converting the Statute Labour in the Counties of Ross and Cromarty and Part of Nairn, locally situate in the County of Ross. (Repealed by Ross and Cromarty Roads Act 1866 (29 & 30 Vict. c. xxviii))
Westminster and Middlesex Sewers Act 1847	10 & 11 Vict. c. lxx	2 July 1847
An Act to explain and amend the Laws of Sewers relating to the City and Liberty of Westminster, and Part of Middlesex.
London (City) Small Debts Act 1847 (repealed)	10 & 11 Vict. c. lxxi	2 July 1847
An Act for the more easy Recovery of Small Debts and Demands within the City of London and the Liberties thereof. (Repealed by London (City) Small Debts Extension Act 1852 (15 & 16 Vict. c. lxxvii))
Cornwall Railway Amendment and Deviation Act 1847 (repealed)	10 & 11 Vict. c. lxxii	2 July 1847
An Act to authorize an Alteration in the Line of the Cornwall Railway and to amend the Act (Note: Cornwall Railway Act 1846 (9 & 10 Vict. c. cccxxxv)) relating thereto; and for other Purposes. (Repealed by Cornwall Railway Act 1861 (24 & 25 Vict. c. ccxv))
Transfer of the Earl of Ellesmere's Interest in the Manchester South Junction and Altrincham Railway Act 1847	10 & 11 Vict. c. lxxiii	2 July 1847
An Act to authorize the Right Honourable Francis Egerton Earl of Ellesmere to sell, and the London and North-western Railway Company to purchase, the Estate and Interest of the said Earl in the Manchester South Junction and Altrincham Railway.
Vale of Neath Railway Amendment Act 1847	10 & 11 Vict. c. lxxiv	2 July 1847
An Act for enabling the Vale of Neath Railway Company to construct certain new Lines of Railway in connexion with the Vale of Neath Railway; and for other Purposes.
General Terminus and Glasgow Harbour Railway (Branches) Act 1847	10 & 11 Vict. c. lxxv	2 July 1847
An Act to enable the General Terminus and Glasgow Harbour Railway Company to make Branch Railways to the Caledonian and other adjoining Railways, and to amend the Act (Note: General Terminus and Glasgow Harbour Railway Act 1846 (9 & 10 Vict. c. cxxx)) relating to such Railway.
Gloucester and Dean Forest Railway Dock Act 1847	10 & 11 Vict. c. lxxvi	2 July 1847
An Act to authorize the Gloucester and Dean Forest Railway Company to construct a Dock or Basin at Gloucester in connexion with the said Railway.
Dunfermline Waterworks Act 1847	10 & 11 Vict. c. lxxvii	2 July 1847
An Act for the better supplying the Town of Dunfermline and Places adjacent thereto with Water.
Ambergate, Nottingham and Boston and Eastern Junction Railway Amendment Act 1847	10 & 11 Vict. c. lxxviii	2 July 1847
An Act to enable the Ambergate, Nottingham, and Boston and Eastern Junction Railway Company to alter the line of their Railway, and to construct a Branch Railway therefrom into the Town of Nottingham.
Llynvi Valley Railway Extension Act 1847 (repealed)	10 & 11 Vict. c. lxxix	2 July 1847
An Act to enable the Llynvi Valley Railway Company to make an Extension of their Railway to Newcastle in the County of Glamorgan, and to amend the Act (Note: Llynvi Valley Railway Act 1846 (9 & 10 Vict. c. cccliii)) relating to their said Railway, to be called "The Llynvi Valley Railway Extension." (Repealed by Llynvi Valley Railway Act 1855 (18 & 19 Vict. c. l))
Shrewsbury and Birmingham Railway (Amendment and Branches) Act 1847	10 & 11 Vict. c. lxxx	2 July 1847
An Act to enable the Shrewsbury and Birmingham Railway Company to make Branch Railways to Madeley and Ironbridge; and for other Purposes.
Bristol and South Wales Junction Railway and Aust Ferry Act 1847 (repealed)	10 & 11 Vict. c. lxxxi	2 July 1847
An Act to enable the Bristol and South Wales Junction Railway Company to improve and maintain the Aust or Old Passage Ferry across the River Severn. (Repealed by Statute Law (Repeals) Act 2013 (c. 2))
Caledonian Railway (Garnkirk Station) Act 1847	10 & 11 Vict. c. lxxxii	2 July 1847
An Act to enable the Caledonian Railway Company to make a Branch Railway from the Glasgow, Garnkirk, and Coatbridge Railway to Glasgow, and to enlarge the Station in that City.
Caledonian and Dumbartonshire Junction Railway (Deviation and Branches) Act 1847	10 & 11 Vict. c. lxxxiii	2 July 1847
An Act to enable the Caledonian and Dumbartonshire Junction Railway Company to make certain Deviations and Branches.
British Commercial Insurance Company Act 1847	10 & 11 Vict. c. lxxxiv	2 July 1847
An Act to repeal An Act of the Second Year of His late Majesty King William the Fourth, intituled "An Act to enable the British Commercial Insurance Company to sue and be sued in the Name of One of the Directors or of the Secretary for the Time being of the Company, and to enable the said Company to sue and be sued in the Name of One of their Directors or of their Secretary for the Time being." (Note: British Commercial Insurance Company Act 1832 (2 & 3 Will. 4. c. xxxviii))
Newry and Enniskillen Railway Amendment Act 1847 (repealed)	10 & 11 Vict. c. lxxxv	2 July 1847
An Act to alter and amend the Newry and Enniskillen Railway Act, 1845. (Note: Newry and Enniskillen Railway Act 1845 (8 & 9 Vict. c. cxxix)) (Repealed by Newry and Enniskillen Railway Amendment and Extension Act 1857 (20 & 21 Vict. c. clvi))
Newport, Abergavenny and Hereford Railway (Deviations) Act 1847	10 & 11 Vict. c. lxxxvi	2 July 1847
An Act for amending the Newport, Abergavenny, and Hereford Railway Act, 1846, (Note: Newport, Abergavenny and Hereford Railway Act 1846 (9 & 10 Vict. c. ccciii)) and to authorize Deviations from the Line of the said Railway, and for making Branches and Extensions therefrom.
Herne Bay and Canterbury Junction Railway Act 1847	10 & 11 Vict. c. lxxxvii	2 July 1847
An Act for making a Railway from Herne Bay to a Junction with the Canterbury and Whitstable Railway, to be called "The Herne Bay and Canterbury Junction Railway."
London and South Western Railway (Widening and York Road Station Enlargement) Act 1847	10 & 11 Vict. c. lxxxviii	2 July 1847
An Act to enable the London and South-western Railway Company to widen and improve the London and South-western Railway from the Junction thereof with the Richmond Railway to the Terminus at Nine Elms, and to enable them to enlarge their intended Station at the York Road, Lambeth.
Dundee and Perth Railway (Alteration and Extension) Act 1847	10 & 11 Vict. c. lxxxix	2 July 1847
An Act to enable the Dundee and Perth Railway Company to alter and extend their Line near to Perth, and to make Branches therefrom to Inchture, Polgavie, and Inchmichael.
Glasgow, Barrhead and Neilston Direct Railway (Amendment and Deviation) Act 1847	10 & 11 Vict. c. xc	2 July 1847
An Act to enable the Glasgow, Barrhead, and Neilston Direct Railway Company to alter a Portion of their Line; and for other Purposes relating thereto.
Great Western Railway (West London Widening and Branches) Act 1847	10 & 11 Vict. c. xci	2 July 1847
An Act for making Branch Railways from the Great Western Railway and from Hammersmith to join the West London Railway, for widening a Portion of the West London Railway, and for extending the same so as to join the London and South-western Railway in the Parish of Saint Mary Lambeth in the County of Surrey.
Eastern Counties Railway (Maldon, Witham, and Braintree) Act 1847 (repealed)	10 & 11 Vict. c. xcii	2 July 1847
An Act to authorize the Purchase by the Eastern Counties Railway Company of the Maldon, Witham, and Braintree Railway. (Repealed by Great Eastern Railway Act 1862 (25 & 26 Vict. c. ccxxiii))
Great Southern and Western Railway (Ireland) Extension, Portarlington to Tullamore Act 1847	10 & 11 Vict. c. xciii	2 July 1847
An Act to enable the Great Southern and Western Railway Company to make a Railway from Portarlington to Tullamore.
Norfolk Railway (Diss Branch Railway) Act 1847 (repealed)	10 & 11 Vict. c. xciv	2 July 1847
An Act to empower the Norfolk Railway Company to make a Railway from Wymondham to Diss. (Repealed by Great Eastern Railway Act 1862 (25 & 26 Vict. c. ccxxiii))
Glasgow, Barrhead and Neilston Direct Railway Act 1847	10 & 11 Vict. c. xcv	2 July 1847
An Act to authorize the Purchase of the Glasgow Southern Terminal Railway by the Glasgow, Barrhead, and Neilston Direct Railway Company, and to amend the Acts relating to the said Company.
Southampton and Dorchester Railway (Lymington and Eling Branches) Act 1847	10 & 11 Vict. c. xcvi	2 July 1847
An Act for making an Alteration in the Line of the Southampton and Dorchester Railway, and Branches therefrom to Lymington and Eling; and for other Purposes.
Southampton and Dorchester Railway (Weymouth Branch) Act 1847	10 & 11 Vict. c. xcvii	2 July 1847
An Act for making a Branch Railway from the Southampton and Dorchester Railway at Moreton to Weymouth, and for other Purposes.
Lowestoft Railway Alteration Act 1847	10 & 11 Vict. c. xcviii	2 July 1847
An Act to authorize an Alteration in the Line of the Lowestoft Railway, and to amend the Act (Note: Lowestoft Railway and Harbour Act 1845 (8 & 9 Vict. c. xlv)) relating to the Lowestoft Railway and Harbour Company.
Norfolk Railway (Yarmouth Extension) Act 1847	10 & 11 Vict. c. xcix	2 July 1847
An Act to enable the Norfolk Railway Company to extend their Railway to the Town of Great Yarmouth; and for other Purposes.
Dublin and Drogheda Railway (Navan to Kells Branch) Act 1847	10 & 11 Vict. c. c	2 July 1847
An Act to enable the Dublin and Drogheda Railway Company to make a Railway from the Navan Branch of the Dublin and Belfast Junction Railway in the County of Meath to the Town of Kells in the same County.
Swansea Valley Railway Act 1847	10 & 11 Vict. c. ci	2 July 1847
An Act for making a Railway from Abercrave Farm in the Parish of Ystradgunlais in the County of Brecon to Swansea in the County of Glamorgan, with Branches, to be called "The Swansea Valley Railway."
Manchester and Lincoln Union Railway (Deviation) Act 1847 (repealed)	10 & 11 Vict. c. cii	2 July 1847
An Act to authorize a Deviation in the Line of the Manchester and Lincoln Union Railway. (Repealed by Manchester, Sheffield and Lincolnshire Railway Act 1849 (12 & 13 Vict. c. lxxxi))
Manchester and Leeds Railway (No. 2) Act 1847	10 & 11 Vict. c. ciii	2 July 1847
An Act to enable the Manchester and Leeds Railway Company to make an Extension of the Holmfirth Branch of the Huddersfield and Sheffield Junction Railway.
South Eastern Railway (No. 2) Act 1847	10 & 11 Vict. c. civ	2 July 1847
An Act to enable the South-eastern Railway Company to make a Railway to connect the London and Greenwich Railway and the North Kent Line of the South-eastern Railway with the Bricklayers Arms Branch Railway.
Liverpool, Crosby and Southport Railway Act 1847	10 & 11 Vict. c. cv	2 July 1847
An Act for making a Railway from the Liverpool and Bury Railway near Liverpool, through Crosby, to the Town of Southport, to be called "The Liverpool, Crosby, and Southport Railway."
Dundee and Newtyle Railway (Widening, Altering and Improving) Act 1847	10 & 11 Vict. c. cvi	2 July 1847
An Act for widening, altering, and improving the Dundee and Newtyle Railway.
London and North Western Railway (Newport Pagnell, Olney and Wellingborough Branch) Act 1847	10 & 11 Vict. c. cvii	2 July 1847
An Act to empower the London and North-western Railway Company to make a Railway from the London and North-western Railway near Bletchley to Newport Pagnel, Olney, and Wellingborough.
North Staffordshire Railway Act 1847	10 & 11 Vict. c. cviii	2 July 1847
An Act to consolidate and amend the Acts relating to the North Staffordshire Railway Company, and to authorize certain Alterations of and the Formation of certain Branches and additional Works in connexion with their Undertaking.
South Wales Railway Amendment Act 1847	10 & 11 Vict. c. cix	2 July 1847
An Act for making certain new Lines of Railway in connexion with the South Wales Railway, and certain Alterations in the Line of the said Railway; and for other Purposes.
Derbyshire, Staffordshire and Worcestershire Junction Railway Act 1847 (repealed)	10 & 11 Vict. c. cx	2 July 1847
An Act to authorize the Construction of a Railway from Cannock in the County of Stafford to Uttoxeter in the same County, to join the North Staffordshire Railway Potteries Line, by a Company to be called "The Derbyshire, Staffordshire, and Worcestershire Junction Railway Company." (Repealed by Cannock Mineral Railway Act 1855 (18 & 19 Vict. c. cxciv))
Dublin and Belfast Junction Railway Amendment Act 1847	10 & 11 Vict. c. cxi	2 July 1847
An Act to authorize the Sale to the Dublin and Drogheda Railway Company of the Navan Branch of the Dublin and Belfast Junction Railway, and to enable the Dublin and Drogheda, the Dublin and Belfast Junction Railway Company with a Branch from Drogheda to Navan, the Ulster, and the Dundalk and Enniskillen Railway Companies, or any of them to amalgamate with one another.
Boston, Stamford and Birmingham Railway (Peterborough and Thorney Line) Act 1847	10 & 11 Vict. c. cxii	2 July 1847
An Act to empower the Boston, Stamford, and Birmingham Railway Company to make a Railway from the Syston and Peterborough Railway at or near Peterborough to the Stamford and Wisbech Line of the Boston, Stamford, and Birmingham Railway in the Parish of Thorney and Isle of Ely.
East Lincolnshire Railway (Louth Navigation Purchase) Act 1847	10 & 11 Vict. c. cxiii	2 July 1847
An Act to authorize the East Lincolnshire Railway Company to purchase an existing Lease of the Louth Navigation.
Coventry and Nuneaton Railway Act 1847	10 & 11 Vict. c. cxiv	2 July 1847
An Act to empower the London and North-western Railway Company to admit certain Parties as Shareholders in their Undertaking for making a Railway from Coventry to Nuneaton in the County of Warwick; and for other Purposes.
London and South Western Railway (Andover and Southampton Junction Railway) Act 1847	10 & 11 Vict. c. cxv	2 July 1847
An Act to enable the London and South-western Railway Company to make Railways from Andover to join their Salisbury Branch Railway at Michaelmarsh, and from the same Branch at Romsey to join the Southampton and Dorchester Railway at Redbridge, all in the County of Southampton, to be called "The Andover and Southampton Junction Railway."
Manchester, Sheffield and Lincolnshire Railway (Bugsworth Branch and Amendment of Acts) Act 1847 (repealed)	10 & 11 Vict. c. cxvi	2 July 1847
An Act for enabling the Manchester, Sheffield, and Lincolnshire Railway Company to make a Railway at Bugsworth, and for amending the Acts relating thereto. (Repealed by Manchester, Sheffield and Lincolnshire Railway Act 1849 (12 & 13 Vict. c. lxxxi))
York and Newcastle Railway (Wearmouth and Dock Enlargement Act) Act 1847	10 & 11 Vict. c. cxvii	2 July 1847
An Act for the Enlargement of the Wearmouth Dock, and the Construction of New Works in connexion therewith; and for other Purposes relating thereto.
London and North Western Railway (Atherstone and Whitacre Branch) Act 1847	10 & 11 Vict. c. cxviii	2 July 1847
An Act to empower the London and North-western Railway Company to make a Branch Railway from the London and North-western Railway near Atherstone to the Midland Railway at Whitacre in the County of Warwick.
Glasgow, Kilmarnock and Ardrossan Railway (Amendment, Deviations and Branches) Act 1847	10 & 11 Vict. c. cxix	2 July 1847
An Act to enable the Glasgow, Kilmarnock, and Ardrossan Railway Company to make certain Branch Railways, and to make certain Deviations from the Line and Levels of the said Railway; and to amend the Act (Note: Glasgow, Kilmarnock and Ardrossan Railway Act 1846 (9 & 10 Vict. c. clix)) relating to the said Railway.
Birmingham, Wolverhampton and Stour Valley Railway (No. 1) (Smethwick Deviation) Act 1847 or the Birmingham, Wolverhampton, and Stour Valley Railway Act 1847 (No. 1.) Smethwick Deviation	10 & 11 Vict. c. cxx	2 July 1847
An Act to authorize a certain Alteration in the Line of the Birmingham, Wolverhampton, and Stour Valley Railway, and to amend the Act (Note: Birmingham, Wolverhampton and Stour Valley Railway (Birmingham, Wolverhampton and Dudley Lines) Act 1846 (9 & 10 Vict. c. cccxxviii)) relating thereto; and for other Purposes.
Shropshire Union Railways and Canal Lease Act 1847	10 & 11 Vict. c. cxxi	2 July 1847
An Act to authorize a Lease of the Undertaking of the Shropshire Union Railways and Canal Company to the London and North-western Railway Company.
Midland Railway (Leicester and Swannington Railway Amendment) Act 1847	10 & 11 Vict. c. cxxii	2 July 1847
An Act to enable the Midland Railway Company to alter the Line of the Leicester and Swannington Railway, and to make certain Branches therefrom; and for other Purposes.
Swansea Dock Act 1847	10 & 11 Vict. c. cxxiii	2 July 1847
An Act for constructing and maintaining Docks and other Works at or near the South Side of the Town of Swansea in the Town and Franchise of Swansea in the County of Glamorgan.
Croydon Commercial Gas and Coke Act 1847 (repealed)	10 & 11 Vict. c. cxxiv	2 July 1847
An Act for lighting with Gas the Town of Croydon and its Vicinity in the County of Surrey. (Repealed by Croydon Gas Act 1866 (29 & 30 Vict. c. xvi))
East Lincolnshire Railway (Branch to Great Grimsby and Sheffield Junction Railway at Grimsby) Act 1847	10 & 11 Vict. c. cxxv	2 July 1847
An Act to amend the East Lincolnshire Railway Act, 1846, (Note: East Lincolnshire Railway Act 1846 (9 & 10 Vict. c. lxxxviii)) and to authorize the Construction of a Branch Railway to join the Great Grimsby and Sheffield Junction Railway near Grimsby.
Falmouth Waterworks Act 1847 (repealed)	10 & 11 Vict. c. cxxvi	2 July 1847
An Act to construct Waterworks for supplying with Water the Town of Falmouth and certain Parishes adjacent thereto in the County of Cornwall. (Repealed by Falmouth Waterworks Act 1862 (25 & 26 Vict. c. xxxiii))
Macduff Harbour Improvement Act 1847 (repealed)	10 & 11 Vict. c. cxxvii	2 July 1847
An Act for improving and maintaining the Harbour of Macduff in the County of Banff. (Repealed by Grampian Regional Council (Harbours) Order Confirmation Act 1987 (c. x))
Warkworth Harbour Act 1847	10 & 11 Vict. c. cxxviii	2 July 1847
An Act to repeal the Acts relating to Warkworth Harbour in the County of Northumberland, and to make other Provisions in lieu thereof.
Bristol Improvement Act 1847	10 & 11 Vict. c. cxxix	2 July 1847
An Act for extending and enlarging the Provisions of the Act (Note: Bristol Improvement Act 1840 (3 & 4 Vict. c. lxxvii)) for regulating Buildings and Party Walls within the City and County of Bristol, and for forming certain Streets, and for widening other Streets within the same.
Midland Great Western Railway of Ireland (Newcastle, Anniskinnan and Baltrasna Deviations) Act 1847 (repealed)	10 & 11 Vict. c. cxxx	2 July 1847
An Act to enable the Midland Great Western Railway of Ireland Company to make certain Deviations in the authorized Line of the said Railway; and to amend the Acts relating thereto. (Repealed by Statute Law (Repeals) Act 2013 (c. 2))
Westminster Improvement Act 1847	10 & 11 Vict. c. cxxxi	9 July 1847
An Act to amend and enlarge the Powers and Provisions of the Westminster Improvement Act, 1845, (Note: Westminster Improvement Act 1845 (8 & 9 Vict. c. clxxviii)) and to authorize the Application of certain Rates in aid of the Improvements.
London and North Western Railway (St. Alban's, Luton and Dunstable Branch) Act 1847	10 & 11 Vict. c. cxxxii	9 July 1847
An Act to empower the London and North-western Railway Company to make a Railway from the London and North-western Railway near Watford to St. Albans, Luton, and Dunstable.
York, Newcastle and Berwick Railways Act 1847	10 & 11 Vict. c. cxxxiii	9 July 1847
An Act to authorize the Consolidation into One Undertaking of the York and Newcastle and the Newcastle and Berwick Railways.
York and Newcastle Railway (Pelaw and other Branches) Act 1847	10 & 11 Vict. c. cxxxiv	9 July 1847
An Act for enabling the York and Newcastle Railway Company to make certain Branch Railways in the Counties of Durham and York; and for other Purposes.
Midland Railways (Extension to Hitchin, Northampton and Huntingdon Railway) Act 1847 (repealed)	10 & 11 Vict. c. cxxxv	9 July 1847
An Act to enable the Midland Railway Company to make a Railway from near Leicester, vid Bedford, to Hitchin and to Northampton and Huntingdon, with Branches; to enlarge the Leicester Station of the Midland Railway; and for other Purposes. (Repealed by Midland Railway (Leicester and Hitchin) Act 1853 (16 & 17 Vict. c. cviii))
North British Railway Act 1847 (repealed)	10 & 11 Vict. c. cxxxvi	9 July 1847
An Act to empower the North British Railway Company to extend the Haddington Branch of the North British Railway, to make certain Alterations in the Hawick and Kelso Branches of the same Railway, and for other Purposes. (Repealed by North British Railway Consolidation Act 1858 (21 & 22 Vict. c. cix))
Ipswich and Bury Railway (Woodbridge Extension) Act 1847 (repealed)	10 & 11 Vict. c. cxxxvii	9 July 1847
An Act to amend the Acts relating to the Ipswich and Bury Saint Edmunds Railway Company, and to enable the Company to construct a Railway from the Ipswich and Bury Saint Edmunds Railway near Ipswich to Woodbridge. (Repealed by Great Eastern Railway Act 1862 (25 & 26 Vict. c. ccxxiii))
Manchester, Sheffield and Lincolnshire Railway (Wragby Branch) Act 1847 (repealed)	10 & 11 Vict. c. cxxxviii	9 July 1847
An Act to enable the Manchester, Sheffield, and Lincolnshire Railway Company to make a Branch Railway from the Market Rasen and Lincoln Line of their Railway in the Parish of Stainton-by-Langworth to the Town of Wragby in the County of Lincoln. (Repealed by Manchester, Sheffield and Lincolnshire Railway Act 1849 (12 & 13 Vict. c. lxxxi))
Birmingham and Lichfield Railway Act 1847	10 & 11 Vict. c. cxxxix	9 July 1847
An Act for enabling the London and North-western Railway Company to make a Railway from Birmingham to Lichfield, and for amending the former Acts relating to the said Company.
York and North Midland Railway (Harrogate Station) Act 1847	10 & 11 Vict. c. cxl	9 July 1847
An Act for enabling the York and North Midland Railway Company to extend the Line of their Harrogate Branch Railway, and make a Station at Harrogate.
York and North Midland Railway (Knottingley Branch) Act 1847	10 & 11 Vict. c. cxli	9 July 1847
An Act for enabling the York and North Midland Railway Company to make a Railway from their Line at Burton Salmon to Knottingley, with a Branch therefrom; and for other Purposes.
Aberdeen Railway (Brechin Branch Deviation) Act 1847	10 & 11 Vict. c. cxlii	9 July 1847
An Act to enable the Aberdeen Railway Company in part to alter their Branch Railway to Brechin.
Great Northern Railway (Deviation near Doncaster) Act 1847	10 & 11 Vict. c. cxliii	9 July 1847
An Act to enable the Great Northern Railway Company to alter the Line of their Railway near Doncaster.
Shrewsbury and Chester Railway Act 1847	10 & 11 Vict. c. cxliv	9 July 1847
An Act to authorize the Shrewsbury and Chester Railway Company to make certain Branches, and to pro vide Station Room and other Conveniences in the City of Chester, and to raise additional Capital for these Purposes; and for amending the former Acts relating to the said Company.
London and South-western Railway Company's Portsmouth Extensions and Godalming Deviation Act 1847 or the London and South Western Railway (Portsmouth Extension and Godalming Deviation) Act 1847	10 & 11 Vict. c. cxlv	9 July 1847
An Act for enabling the London and South-western Railway Company to make Extensions of the Guildford Extension and Portsmouth and Fareham Railway near Portsmouth, and a Deviation in the authorized Line thereof near Godalming.
Great Northern Railway (Deviations between Grantham and York) Act 1847	10 & 11 Vict. c. cxlvi	9 July 1847
An Act to enable the Great Northern Railway Company to make certain Alterations in the Line of their Railway as already authorized between Grantham and York.
Chester and Holyhead Railway (Chester Extension and Amendment) Act 1847	10 & 11 Vict. c. cxlvii	9 July 1847
An Act to authorize an Extension of and the Construction of a Station in connexion with the Chester and Holyhead Railway at Chester and for other Purposes.
Great Northern Railway Company's Purchase Act 1847	10 & 11 Vict. c. cxlviii	9 July 1847
An Act to enable the Great Northern Railway Company to take a Lease of or to purchase the East Lincolnshire Railway, and the Boston, Stamford, and Birmingham Railway.
Birmingham, Wolverhampton and Dudley Railway Amendment Act 1847	10 & 11 Vict. c. cxlix	9 July 1847
An Act for enabling the Birmingham, Wolverhampton, and Dudley Railway Company to purchase Lands for additional Station Room at Birmingham, and for authorizing the Sale of the Undertaking of the said Company to the Great Western Railway Company.
Midland Railway (Masbrough and Normanton Stations Enlargement) Act 1847	10 & 11 Vict. c. cl	9 July 1847
An Act to enable the Midland Railway Company to enlarge their Stations at Masbrough and Normanton respectively, and to construct additional Sidings or Branch Railways.
Edinburgh, Leith and Granton Railway (Leith Extension) Act 1847	10 & 11 Vict. c. cli	9 July 1847
An Act to enable the Edinburgh, Leith, and Granton Railway Company to make a Branch Railway to the Upper Drawbridge in the Town of Leith.
Edinburgh, Leith and Granton Railway (Leith and Granton Junction) Act 1847	10 & 11 Vict. c. clii	9 July 1847
An Act to enable the Edinburgh, Leith, and Granton Railway Company to make a Branch Railway from Bonnington to Trinity Villa; to acquire certain Pieces of Land; and to shut up and use certain Roads or Streets for the Purposes of the said Railway.
Portadown and Dungannon Railway Act 1847	10 & 11 Vict. c. cliii	9 July 1847
An Act for making a Railway from Portadown in the County of Armagh to Dungannon in the County of Tyrone, to be called "The Portadown and Dungannon Railway."
Cheltenham and Oxford Railway Act 1847	10 & 11 Vict. c. cliv	9 July 1847
An Act for making a Railway from the Great Western Railway at Cheltenham to join the Oxford and Rugby Railway near Oxford, with a Branch therefrom; and for other Purposes.
Boston, Stamford and Birmingham Railway (Sutton Railway and Harbour) Act 1847	10 & 11 Vict. c. clv	9 July 1847
An Act to empower the Boston, Stamford, and Birmingham Railway Company to make a Railway from Wisbech to Sutton Bridge, with a Branch to Sutton Saint Mary, and to improve the Harbour at Sutton Bridge.
Eastern Counties Railway (North Woolwich) Act 1847	10 & 11 Vict. c. clvi	9 July 1847
An Act to authorize the Purchase by the Eastern Counties Railway Company of the North Woolwich Railway and the Lease of the Pepper Warehouses and Wharfs of the East and West India Dock Company.
Eastern Counties Railway Act 1847	10 & 11 Vict. c. clvii	9 July 1847
An Act to enable the Eastern Counties Railway Company to enlarge their London and Stratford Stations; and to amend some of the Provisions of the Acts relating to the Eastern Counties Railway Company.
Eastern Counties (Cambridge to Bedford Railway) Act 1847 (repealed)	10 & 11 Vict. c. clviii	9 July 1847
An Act to enable the Eastern Counties Railway Company to make a Railway from the Eastern Counties Railway near Cambridge to the Bedford and Bletchley Railway at or near Bedford, with Branches. (Repealed by Great Eastern Railway Act 1862 (25 & 26 Vict. c. ccxxiii))
London and North Western Railway Act 1847	10 & 11 Vict. c. clix	9 July 1847
An Act to incorporate the Huddersfield and Manchester Railway and Canal Company and the Leeds, Dewsbury, and Manchester Railway Company with the London and North-western Railway Company.
Dublin, Dundrum and Rathfarnham Railway, St. Stephens Green Extension Act 1847 (repealed)	10 & 11 Vict. c. clx	9 July 1847
An Act to enlarge the Powers of the Dublin, Dundrum, and Rathfarnham Railway Act, 1846, (Note: Dublin, Dundrum, and Rathfarnham Railway Act 1846 (9 & 10 Vict. c. cxcix)) and to enable the Company to make an Extension to Stephen's Green. (Repealed by Dublin and Wicklow Railway Amendment Act 1857 (20 & 21 Vict. c. xxix))
Huddersfield and Manchester Railway (Deviations and Alterations in Oldham Branch) Act 1847	10 & 11 Vict. c. clxi	9 July 1847
An Act for enabling the Huddersfield and Manchester Railway and Canal Company to alter a Portion of the Line of their Oldham Branch; and for other Purposes.
Mold Railway Act 1847	10 & 11 Vict. c. clxii	9 July 1847
An Act for making a Railway from Mold in the County of Flint to join the Chester and Holyhead Railway in the Parish of Hawarden in the same County, with Branches, to be called "The Mold Railway."
Manchester and Leeds Railway Act (No. 3) 1847 or the Lancashire and Yorkshire Railway Act 1847	10 & 11 Vict. c. clxiii	9 July 1847
An Act to enable the Manchester and Leeds Company to make certain Branches, Extensions, and other Works, and to alter the Name of the Company.
Blackburn, Darwen and Bolton Railway Amendment Act 1847	10 & 11 Vict. c. clxiv	9 July 1847
An Act for enabling the Blackburn, Darwen, and Bolton Railway Company to make certain Alterations in the Line of their Railway in the Parishes of Blackburn and Bolton-in-the-Moors; and for amending the Acts relating thereto.
Manchester, Sheffield and Lincolnshire Railways (Thurgoland Coal Branch) Act 1847 (repealed)	10 & 11 Vict. c. clxv	9 July 1847
An Act for enabling the Manchester, Sheffield, and Lincolnshire Railway Company to make a Coal Branch from their Thurgoland Station to the Township of Stainborough. (Repealed by Manchester, Sheffield and Lincolnshire Railway Act 1849 (12 & 13 Vict. c. lxxxi))
Manchester and Leeds Railway Act (No. 1) 1847 or the Lancashire and Yorkshire Railway Act 1847	10 & 11 Vict. c. clxvi	9 July 1847
An Act to enable the Manchester and Leeds Railway Company to alter the Line and Levels of the Brighouse Branch of the West Riding Union Railways, and to make a new Line into Leeds.
Direct London and Portsmouth Railway Act 1847	10 & 11 Vict. c. clxvii	9 July 1847
An Act to enable the Direct London and Portsmouth Railway Company to make an Approach to the Town of Dorking, and a Deviation in the Line and certain Alterations in the Levels of their Railway and in the Croydon and Epsom Railway.
Glasgow, Paisley and Greenock Railway Act 1847	10 & 11 Vict. c. clxviii	9 July 1847
An Act to enable the Glasgow, Paisley, and Greenock Railway Company to make a certain Branch Railway to the Caledonian Railway at Glasgow, and to divert Part of the Glasgow, Paisley, and Ardrossan Canal.
Caledonian and Glasgow, Paisley and Greenock Railways Amalgamation Act 1847	10 & 11 Vict. c. clxix	9 July 1847
An Act to amalgamate the Glasgow, Paisley, and Greenock Railway with the Caledonian Railway, and to authorize the raising of additional Money by the said last-mentioned Company.
Lynn and Ely Railway (Deviation and Lynn Dock) Act 1847 (repealed)	10 & 11 Vict. c. clxx	9 July 1847
An Act for making a Deviation in the Line of the Lynn and Ely Railway, and for forming Docks within the Borough of King's Lynn. (Repealed by Great Eastern Railway Act 1862 (25 & 26 Vict. c. ccxxiii))
Lynn and Ely Railway (Lynn and Wormegay Navigation) Act 1847 (repealed)	10 & 11 Vict. c. clxxi	9 July 1847
An Act to enable the Lynn and Ely Railway Company to make a Navigation from Lynn to Wormegay, all in the County of Norfolk. (Repealed by Great Eastern Railway Act 1862 (25 & 26 Vict. c. ccxxiii))
Caledonian Railway (Dumfrieshire and Cumberland Branches) Act 1847	10 & 11 Vict. c. clxxii	9 July 1847
An Act to enable the Caledonian Railway Company to make certain Branch Railways in the Counties of Dumfries and Cumberland.
East Lothian Central Railway Act 1847	10 & 11 Vict. c. clxxiii	9 July 1847
An Act for making a Railway from the North British Railway at East Linton to Ormiston, to be called "The East Lothian Central Railway."
Eastern Union Railway Act 1847	10 & 11 Vict. c. clxxiv	9 July 1847
An Act to amalgamate the Eastern Union and Ipswich and Bury Saint Edmunds Railway Companies.
Chard Railway Act 1847	10 & 11 Vict. c. clxxv	9 July 1847
An Act to enable the Chard Canal and Railway Company to extend their Railway from Ilminster to Chard, all in the County of Somerset.
Midland Great Western Railway of Ireland (Athlone to Galway Extension) Act 1847 (repealed)	10 & 11 Vict. c. clxxvi	9 July 1847
An Act to enable the Midland Great Western Railway of Ireland Company to make a Railway from Athlone to Galway. (Repealed by Statute Law (Repeals) Act 2013 (c. 2))
Newport, Abergavenny and Hereford Railway (Extension to Taff Vale Railway) Act 1847	10 & 11 Vict. c. clxxvii	9 July 1847
An Act to enable the Newport, Abergavenny, and Hereford Railway Company to extend their Railway from the Neighbourhood of Pontipool to the Taff Vale Railway.
Northampton and Banbury Railway Act 1847	10 & 11 Vict. c. clxxviii	9 July 1847
An Act for making a Railway from the Northampton and Peterborough Branch of the London and North-western Railway to the Town of Banbury, to be called "The Northampton and Banbury Railway;" and for other Purposes.
Swansea and Amman Junction Railway Act 1847	10 & 11 Vict. c. clxxix	9 July 1847
An Act for making a Railway from the Swansea Vale Railway at Ynisymond in the Parish of Cadoxton to Nantmelyn in the Parish of Llangefelach, both in the County of Glamorgan, with Branches.
Dublin and Drogheda Railway (Purchase of Navan Branch) Act 1847	10 & 11 Vict. c. clxxx	9 July 1847
An Act to authorize the Purchase by the Dublin and Drogheda Railway Company of the Navan Branch of the Dublin and Belfast Junction Railway, and to authorize the Dublin and Drogheda, the Dublin and Belfast Junction Railway, with a Branch from Drogheda to Navan, the Ulster, and the Dundalk and Enniskillen Railway Companies, or any of them to amalgamate with one another.
Glasgow, Dumfries and Carlisle Railway Amendment (No. 1) Act 1847 (repealed)	10 & 11 Vict. c. clxxxi	9 July 1847
An Act to amend some of the Provisions of the Glasgow, Dumfries, and Carlisle Railway Act, 1846. (Note: Glasgow, Dumfries, and Carlisle Railway Act 1846 (9 & 10 Vict. c. ccclxxii)) (Repealed by Glasgow and South Western Railway Consolidation Act 1855 (18 & 19 Vict. c. xcvii))
Glasgow, Dumfries and Carlisle Railway Amendment (No. 2) Act 1847 (repealed)	10 & 11 Vict. c. clxxxii	9 July 1847
An Act to amend the Act (Note: Glasgow, Dumfries, and Carlisle Railway Act 1846 (9 & 10 Vict. c. ccclxxii)) relating to the Glasgow, Dumfries, and Carlisle Railway Company, and to authorize the Company to make a Branch Railway to Kirkcudbright, with diverging Lines therefrom; and for other purposes. (Repealed by Glasgow and South Western Railway Consolidation Act 1855 (18 & 19 Vict. c. xcvii))
Glasgow and South Western Railway Incorporation Act 1847 (repealed)	10 & 11 Vict. c. clxxxiii	9 July 1847
An Act to amend the Acts and alter the Terms of Amalgamation of the Glasgow, Dumfries, and Carlisle Railway Company, and of the Glasgow, Paisley, Kilmarnock, and Ayr Railway Company. (Repealed by Glasgow and South Western Railway Consolidation Act 1855 (18 & 19 Vict. c. xcvii))
Glasgow, Paisley, Kilmarnock and Ayr Railway and Glasgow and Belfast Union Railway Amendment and Branches (No. 1) Act 1847 (repealed)	10 & 11 Vict. c. clxxxiv	9 July 1847
An Act to enable the Glasgow, Paisley, Kilmarnock, and Ayr Railway Company to make certain Branch Railways in the County of Ayr, and to alter the Line of the Glasgow and Belfast Union Railway; and for other Purposes. (Repealed by Glasgow and South Western Railway Consolidation Act 1855 (18 & 19 Vict. c. xcvii))
Glasgow, Paisley, Kilmarnock and Ayr Railway Amendment and Branches (No. 2) Act 1847 (repealed)	10 & 11 Vict. c. clxxxv	9 July 1847
An Act to authorize the Construction of certain Branch Railways in the County of Ayr in connexion with the Glasgow, Paisley, Kilmarnock, and Ayr Railway; and for other Purposes. (Repealed by Glasgow and South Western Railway Consolidation Act 1855 (18 & 19 Vict. c. xcvii))
Glasgow, Paisley, Kilmarnock and Ayr Railway Amendment (No. 4) Act 1847 (repealed)	10 & 11 Vict. c. clxxxvi	9 July 1847
An Act to amend the Acts relating to the Glasgow, Paisley, Kilmarnock, and Ayr Railway, and to provide additional Station Accommodation; and for other Purposes. (Repealed by Glasgow and South Western Railway Consolidation Act 1855 (18 & 19 Vict. c. xcvii))
Parkgate Railway Act 1847	10 & 11 Vict. c. clxxxvii	9 July 1847
An Act for making a Railway from Parkgate in the Parish of Great Neston in the County of Chester to join the Chester and Birkenhead Railway in the Parish of Bebbington in the same County.
Portobello and Wolverhampton Railway Act 1847	10 & 11 Vict. c. clxxxviii	9 July 1847
An Act for enabling the London and North-western Railway Company to make a Branch Line of Railway from Portobello to Wolverhampton; and for other Purposes.
South Staffordshire Railway Act 1847	10 & 11 Vict. c. clxxxix	9 July 1847
An Act to empower the South Staffordshire Railway Company to make divers Branch Railways; and for other Purposes.
Manchester, Sheffield and Lincolnshire Railways, and Manchester and Lincoln Union Railway and Chesterfield and Gainsborough Canal Amalgamation Act 1847 (repealed)	10 & 11 Vict. c. cxc	9 July 1847
An Act to incorporate the Manchester and Lincoln Railway and Chesterfield and Gainsborough Canal Company with the Manchester, Sheffield, and Lincolnshire Railway Company. (Repealed by Manchester, Sheffield and Lincolnshire Railway Act 1849 (12 & 13 Vict. c. lxxxi))
Midland Railway (Mansfield and Pinxton Branch) Act 1847	10 & 11 Vict. c. cxci	9 July 1847
An Act to enable the Midland Railway Company to purchase the Mansfield and Pinxton Railway, and to alter the same, and to make a Railway from the Erewash Valley Railway to the Nottingham and Mansfield Railway, with Branches to Mansfield, and also to the Alfreton Ironworks.
Edinburgh and Northern Railway (Burntisland Pier and Ferry) Act 1847 or the Burntisland Pier and Ferry Act 1847	10 & 11 Vict. c. cxcii	9 July 1847
An Act to vest in the Edinburgh and Northern Railway Company the Undertaking of the Low-water Pier at Burntisland, and of the Ferry between the same and Granton, and to enable the said Company to extend and improve the said Pier.
Boston, Stamford and Birmingham Railway (Branch to Wisbech Harbour and Wisbech Harbour Improvement) Act 1847	10 & 11 Vict. c. cxciii	9 July 1847
An Act to empower the Boston, Stamford, and Birmingham Railway Company to make a Branch Railway from the Stamford and Wisbech Line of the Boston, Stamford, and Birmingham Railway at Wisbech to Wisbech Harbour, and to construct certain Works at Wisbech Harbour.
Cork and Bandon Railway (Extension, Deviation and Amendment) Act 1847 (repealed)	10 & 11 Vict. c. cxciv	9 July 1847
An Act to authorize an Alteration in the Line of the Cork and Bandon Railway, and an Extension thereof into the City of Cork; and to amend the Act (Note: Cork and Bandon Railway Act 1845 (8 & 9 Vict. c. cxxii)) relating to the said Railway. (Repealed by Cork and Bandon Railway Act 1853 (16 & 17 Vict. c. ccii))
Great North of Scotland Railway Act 1847 (repealed)	10 & 11 Vict. c. cxcv	9 July 1847
An Act to consolidate the Aberdeen and Great North Scotland Railway Companies. (Repealed by Aberdeen Railway Act 1850 (13 & 14 Vict. c. lxxviii))
Sandwich Haven Improvement and Regulation Act 1847	10 & 11 Vict. c. cxcvi	9 July 1847
An Act for improving regulating and maintaining the Haven of Sandwich in the County of Kent.
Wisbech Harbour Act 1847 (repealed)	10 & 11 Vict. c. cxcvii	9 July 1847
An Act to enable the Mayor, Aldermen, and Burgesses of the Borough of Wisbech, as Guardians of the Port and Harbour of Wisbech, to raise a sum of Money; and for other Purposes. (Repealed by Wisbech Port Act 1855 (18 & 19 Vict. c. clx))
Limerick Docks and Harbour Improvement Amendment Act 1847	10 & 11 Vict. c. cxcviii	9 July 1847
An Act for amending Two Acts of Parliament, passed respectively in the Fourth Year of the Reign of His late Majesty King George the Fourth (Note: Limerick Bridge and Floating Dock Act 1823 (4 Geo. 4. c. xciv)) and the Fourth and Fifth Years of the Reign of His late Majesty King William the Fourth, (Note: Limerick Bridge Act 1834 (4 & 5 Will. 4. c. lxxxiv)) for erecting a Bridge across the River Shannon, and a Floating Dock and other Works for the Improvement of the Port of Limerick.
Wakefield Gas Act 1847 (repealed)	10 & 11 Vict. c. cxcix	9 July 1847
An Act for better supplying with Gas the Parish and Neighbourhood of Wakefield in the West Riding of the County of York. (Repealed by West Yorkshire Act 1980 (c. xiv))
Port of London (Legal Quays) Act 1846 Continuance Act 1847 (repealed)	10 & 11 Vict. c. cc	9 July 1847
An Act for making perpetual the Provisions of an Act passed in the last Session of Parliament, intituled "An Act for the Regulation of the Legal Quays within the Port of London." (Note: Port of London (Legal Quays) Act 1846 (9 & 10 Vict. c. cccxcix)) (Repealed by Statute Law (Repeals) Act 1993 (c. 50))
Ashton-under-Lyne Gas Act 1847	10 & 11 Vict. c. cci	9 July 1847
An Act for better supplying with Gas the Town of Ashton-under-Lyne in the County Palatine of Lancaster, and the Neighbourhood thereof.
Edinburgh Water Company's Act 1847 (repealed)	10 & 11 Vict. c. ccii	9 July 1847
An Act for better supplying with Water the City of Edinburgh and Places adjacent. (Repealed by Edinburgh Corporation Order Confirmation Act 1958 (7 & 8 Eliz. 2. c. v))
Manchester Corporation Waterworks Act 1847	10 & 11 Vict. c. cciii	9 July 1847
An Act to enable the Mayor, Aldermen, and Burgesses of the Borough of Manchester in the County of Lancaster to construct Waterworks for supplying the said Borough and several Places on the Line of the said intended Works with Water; and for other Purposes.
Staffordshire Potteries Waterworks Act 1847 (repealed)	10 & 11 Vict. c. cciv	9 July 1847
An Act for supplying with Water certain Parts of Staffordshire Potteries and the Town of Newcastle-under-Lyme and several Townships and Places adjoining or near thereto. (Repealed by Staffordshire Potteries Waterworks Consolidation and Extension Act 1853 (16 & 17 Vict. c. cxcviii))
Lendal Bridge and York Improvement Act 1847 (repealed)	10 & 11 Vict. c. ccv	9 July 1847
An Act for building a Bridge across the River Ouse in the City of York, with Approaches thereto, and for widening, altering, and improving certain Streets or Thoroughfares within the said City; and for other Purposes. (Repealed by York Corporation Act 1969 (c. xxxviii))
Norwich Small Tenements Act 1847	10 & 11 Vict. c. ccvi	9 July 1847
An Act for the more effectually assessing, collecting and levying the Poor and other Rates in the City and County of the City of Norwich, and Liberties of the same.
Kilmarnock Police and Improvement Act 1847	10 & 11 Vict. c. ccvii	9 July 1847
An Act for amending the Acts relating to the Police and Improvement of the Burgh of Kilmarnock; and for other Purposes in relation thereto.
Inverness Burgh Act 1847	10 & 11 Vict. c. ccviii	9 July 1847
An Act for extending the Municipal Boundaries of the Burgh of Inverness; establishing a general System of Police therein, and regulating the Petty Customs; and for other Purposes relating to the said Burgh.
Inverness Harbour Act 1847	10 & 11 Vict. c. ccix	9 July 1847
An Act for deepening, enlarging, improving, and maintaining the Port and Harbour of Inverness, and the Navigation of the River Ness, and the Quays and Piers and other Works connected therewith; for regulating the Anchorage and Shore Dues of the said Port and Harbour; and for other Purposes relating thereto.
Leeds and Thirsk Railway (Crimple Deviation and Carlton Junction) Act 1847	10 & 11 Vict. c. ccx	9 July 1847
An Act for enabling the Leeds and Thirsk Railway Company to deviate the Main Line of their Railway in Crimple Valley, to alter the proposed Junction with the York and Newcastle Railway, and to divert the Leeds, Wortley, and Stanningley Turnpike Road.
Lincoln's Inn Rates Act 1847 (repealed)	10 & 11 Vict. c. ccxi	9 July 1847
An Act to confirm an Agreement between the Treasurer and Masters of the Bench of the Honourable Society of Lincoln's Inn in the County of Middlesex and the joint Vestry of the joint Parishes of Saint Giles-in-the-Fields and Saint George Bloomsbury in the same County and the Rector and Vestry of the separate Parish of Saint Giles-in-the-Fields. (Repealed by London County (Borough of Holborn) (Lincoln's Inn) Order 1901 (SR&O 1901/262))
Landowners Drainage and Inclosure Company Act 1847	10 & 11 Vict. c. ccxii	9 July 1847
An Act for incorporating the Landowners Drainage and Inclosure Company, and for enabling the Owners of settled Estates, drained, irrigated, inclosed, and improved by the said Company, to charge the same for the Purposes of such Drainage, Inclosure, and Improvement.
Ayrshire Roads Act 1847	10 & 11 Vict. c. ccxiii	9 July 1847
An Act for repairing and keeping in repair the Turnpike Roads in the County of Ayr; for making and maintaining new Roads, and altering and improving existing Roads; for rendering Turnpike certain Parish Roads; and for regulating the Statute Labour and Bridge Money in the said County.
Midland Railway Act 1847	10 & 11 Vict. c. ccxiv	22 July 1847
An Act to empower the Midland Railway Company to extend the Line of their Nottingham and Lincoln Railway at Lincoln, and to make a Branch Railway to their Lincoln Station.
Midland Railway (Syston and Peterborough Deviations and Manton Approach) Act 1847	10 & 11 Vict. c. ccxv	22 July 1847
An Act to authorize certain Deviations in the Line of the Syston and Peterborough Branch of the Midland Railway, and the Formation of a Road or Approach to the intended Manton Station thereof.
York and North Midland Railway (Canals Purchase) Act 1847	10 & 11 Vict. c. ccxvi	22 July 1847
An Act to authorize the Purchase by the York and North Midland Railway Company of the Interests of the Shareholders in the Market Weighton Canal, and the Purchase of the Canal communicating therewith called Sir Edward Vavasour's Canal, of the Pocklington Canal, and of the Leven Canal, all in the East Riding of the County of York.
Surrey and Kent Drainage (East Moulsey to Ravensbourne) Act 1847	10 & 11 Vict. c. ccxvii	22 July 1847
An Act to facilitate the effectual Drainage of certain Districts within the Commission of Sewers for the Limits extending from East Moulsey in Surrey to Ravensbourne in Kent.
York and North Midland Railway (Hull Station) Act 1847	10 & 11 Vict. c. ccxviii	22 July 1847
An Act for enabling the York and North Midland Railway Company to make a Station at Hull, and certain Branch Railways connected with their Railways and the said Station; and for other Purposes.
York and North Midland Railway (Boroughbridge and Knaresborough Extension) Act 1847	10 & 11 Vict. c. ccxix	22 July 1847
An Act for enabling the York and North Midland Railway Company to make a Railway from their Church Fenton and Harrogate Branch to Knaresborough and Boroughbridge.
Edinburgh and Northern Railway (Dunfermline Branch Deviation and Extension, &c.) Act 1847	10 & 11 Vict. c. ccxx	22 July 1847
An Act to enable the Edinburgh and Northern Railway Company to make a Deviation and Extension of their Branch Railway to Dunfermline, to make another Railway from their Strathearn Deviation Railway to the Scottish Central Railway, and to make an Alteration in the Manner of constructing the said Branch and Strathearn Deviation across certain Roads.
Manchester and Southport Railway Act 1847	10 & 11 Vict. c. ccxxi	22 July 1847
An Act for making a Railway from Southport through Wigan to Pendleton near Manchester, with several Branches, to be called "The Manchester and Southport Railway."
Birkenhead, Lancashire and Cheshire Junction Railway and Chester and Birkenhead Railway Amalgamation Act 1847 (repealed)	10 & 11 Vict. c. ccxxii	22 July 1847
An Act to incorporate the Chester and Birkenhead Railway with the Birkenhead, Lancashire, and Cheshire Junction Railway. (Repealed by Birkenhead, Lancashire and Cheshire Junction Railway Act 1852 (15 & 16 Vict. c. clxvii))
Birkenhead, Lancashire and Cheshire Junction Railway (Deviation of Main Line, &c.) Act 1847 (repealed)	10 & 11 Vict. c. ccxxiii	22 July 1847
An Act for enabling the Birkenhead, Lancashire, and Cheshire Junction Railway Company to make a Deviation in the Chester Branch of their Railway; and for other Purposes. (Repealed by Birkenhead, Lancashire and Cheshire Junction Railway Act 1852 (15 & 16 Vict. c. clxvii))
East of Fife Railway (Markinch Deviation) Act 1847 (repealed)	10 & 11 Vict. c. ccxxiv	22 July 1847
An Act to enable the East of Fife Railway Company to make a Deviation in their Main Line, and to improve the Junction with the Edinburgh and Northern Railway near Markinch. (Repealed by East of Fife Railway Dissolution Act 1850 (13 & 14 Vict. c. xcvii))
Eastern Union and Harwich Railway and Pier Act 1847 (repealed)	10 & 11 Vict. c. ccxxv	22 July 1847
An Act to empower the Eastern Union Railway Company to make a Railway from the Eastern Union Railway at Manningtree to Harwich, with Branches thereout; and for other Purposes. (Repealed by Great Eastern Railway Act 1862 (25 & 26 Vict. c. ccxxiii))
Great Western Railway (Amendment and Extensions) Act 1847	10 & 11 Vict. c. ccxxvi	22 July 1847
An Act for making Branch Railways from the Great Western Railway to Henby and to Radstock; to widen certain Portions of the Great Western Railway; to enable the Great Western Railway Company to purchase or amalgamate with the Birmingham, Wolverhampton, and Dudley Railway, and to purchase the Wycombe and Great Western and Uxbridge Railways; and for other Purposes.
Liverpool, Manchester and Newcastle-upon-Tyne Junction Railway Amendment Act 1847	10 & 11 Vict. c. ccxxvii	22 July 1847
An Act to authorize certain Alterations in the Line of the Liverpool, Manchester, and Newcastle-upon-Tyne Junction Railway; and for other Purposes.
Lime Street (Liverpool) and Crewe Stations Extensions Act 1847	10 & 11 Vict. c. ccxxviii	22 July 1847
An Act to empower the London and North-western Railway Company to enlarge their Stations at Liverpool and Crewe; and for other Purposes.
Paisley and Renfrew Railway (Sale and Improvement) Act 1847	10 & 11 Vict. c. ccxxix	22 July 1847
An Act to authorize the Sale of the Paisley and Renfrew Railway to the Glasgow, Paisley, Kilmarnock, and Ayr Railway Company, and the Improvement of the said Railway by that Company.
South Eastern Railway Act 1847	10 & 11 Vict. c. ccxxx	22 July 1847
An Act to enable the South-eastern Railway Company further to widen the London and Greenwich Railway, and to enlarge their London Bridge Station.
Waterford and Limerick Railway Amendment Act 1847	10 & 11 Vict. c. ccxxxi	22 July 1847
An Act to authorize certain Alterations in the Line of the Waterford and Limerick Railway; and to amend the Act (Note: Waterford and Limerick Railway Act 1845 (8 & 9 Vict. c. cxxxi)) relating thereto; and for other Purposes.
Oldham Alliance Railway Act 1847	10 & 11 Vict. c. ccxxxii	22 July 1847
An Act for making certain Lines of Railway in the County of Lancaster, to be called "The Oldham Alliance Railway."
Manchester and Birmingham and North Staffordshire Junction Railway Act 1847	10 & 11 Vict. c. ccxxxiii	22 July 1847
An Act for making a Railway and Branch Railways in the County of Chester, to be called "The Manchester and Birmingham and North Staffordshire Junction Railway."
Glasgow, Paisley, Kilmarnock and Ayr Railway and Ayrshire and Bridge of Weir Railway Amendment and Branches (No. 3) Act 1847 (repealed)	10 & 11 Vict. c. ccxxxiv	22 July 1847
An Act to enable the Glasgow, Paisley, Kilmarnock and Ayr Railway Company to make certain Branch Railways in the County of Renfrew; and for other Purposes. (Repealed by Glasgow and South Western Railway Consolidation Act 1855 (18 & 19 Vict. c. xcvii))
Eastern Counties (Wisbech to Spalding) Railway Act 1847 (repealed)	10 & 11 Vict. c. ccxxxv	22 July 1847
An Act to enable the Eastern Counties Railway Company to make a Railway from Wisbech to Spalding. (Repealed by Great Eastern Railway Act 1862 (25 & 26 Vict. c. ccxxiii))
Buckinghamshire Railway Act 1847	10 & 11 Vict. c. ccxxxvi	22 July 1847
An Act to authorize the Consolidation into One Undertaking of the Oxford and Bletchley Junction Railway Company and the Buckingham and Brackley Junction Railway Company, and to enable the Company so to be consolidated to make Extension Lines to Banbury and Aylesbury, and an Alteration of the Line into the City of Oxford.
Caledonian Railway (Edinburgh Station and Branches) Act 1847	10 & 11 Vict. c. ccxxxvii	22 July 1847
An Act to enable the Caledonian Railway Company to extend their Station in Edinburgh, and to make Branch Railways to Granton and to the Edinburgh and Glasgow Railway.
Chester and Holyhead Railway (Holyhead Extension and Amendment) Act 1847	10 & 11 Vict. c. ccxxxviii	22 July 1847
An Act to enable the Chester and Holyhead Railway Company to extend their Line of Railway to the proposed new Harbour at Holyhead, and to contribute towards the Expense of constructing the said Harbour.
Edinburgh and Northern Railway Company and Edinburgh, Leith and Granton Railway Company Amalgamation Act 1847	10 & 11 Vict. c. ccxxxix	22 July 1847
An Act to incorporate the Edinburgh, Leith, and Granton Railway Company with the Edinburgh and Northern Railway Company.
Liverpool, Manchester and Newcastle-upon-Tyne Junction Railway (Burnley Branch) Act 1847	10 & 11 Vict. c. ccxl	22 July 1847
An Act to enable the Liverpool, Manchester, and Newcastle-upon-Tyne Junction Railway Company to make a Railway from the Burnley Branch of the Manchester and Leeds Railway in the Township of Habergham Eaves in the Parish of Whalley in the County of Lancaster to the East Lancashire Railway in the same Township; and for other Purposes.
Reading, Guildford and Reigate Railway Amendment Act 1847	10 & 11 Vict. c. ccxli	22 July 1847
An Act to authorize a certain Alteration in the Line of the Reading, Guildford, and Reigate Railway, and to amend the Act (Note: Reading, Guildford and Reigate Railway Act 1846 (9 & 10 Vict. c. clxxi)) relating thereto.
South Devon Railway (Extensions and Amendment) Act 1847	10 & 11 Vict. c. ccxlii	22 July 1847
An Act to enable the South Devon Railway Company to extend the Line of the South Devon Railway to Torquay and to Brixham; and for other Purposes.
Exeter and Exmouth Railway Act 1847	10 & 11 Vict. c. ccxliii	22 July 1847
An Act to amend the Exeter and Exmouth Railway Act, 1846, (Note: Exeter and Exmouth Railway Act 1846 (9 & 10 Vict. c. cxxix)) and to enable the London and South-western Railway Company to subscribe towards, lease, or purchase the said Railway.
Brighton and Chichester (Portsmouth Extension) and London and South Western Railways Act 1847	10 & 11 Vict. c. ccxliv	22 July 1847
An Act for authorizing the Sale of Part of the Brighton and Chichester (Portsmouth Extension) Railway to the London and South-western and the London, Brighton, and South Coast Railway Companies, and the Use by the last-mentioned Company of Part (Wandsworth to London) of the London and South-western Railway.
Glasgow, Airdrie and Monklands Junction Railway (Cowlairs Branch) Act 1847	10 & 11 Vict. c. ccxlv	22 July 1847
An Act for making a Branch Railway from the Glasgow, Airdrie, and Monklands Junction Railway at or near Whitevale Street, Glasgow, to the Edinburgh and Glasgow Railway at or near Cowlairs; and to amend the Acts relating to such Railways.
Edinburgh and Bathgate Railway (Deviation and Amendment) Act 1847	10 & 11 Vict. c. ccxlvi	22 July 1847
An Act to enable the Edinburgh and Bathgate Railway Company to deviate a Portion of their Main Line, and for other Purposes.
Manchester, Buxton, Matlock and Midlands Junction Railway Act 1847	10 & 11 Vict. c. ccxlvii	22 July 1847
An Act to make certain Deviations in the authorized Line of the "Manchester, Buxton, Matlock, and Midlands Junction Railway," and to amend the Act (Note: Manchester, Buxton, Matlock and Midlands Junction Railway Act 1846 (9 & 10 Vict. c. cxcii)) relating thereto.
Royston and Hitchin Railway Amendment Act 1847	10 & 11 Vict. c. ccxlviii	22 July 1847
An Act to enable the Royston and Hitchin Railway Company to lease or sell their Line, and to authorize the said Company to enter into Contracts and complete Arrangements with the Great Northern Railway Company.
London and South Western Railway Amendment Act 1847	10 & 11 Vict. c. ccxlix	22 July 1847
An Act to amend the Acts relating to the London and South-western Railway.
Bathwick Church and Workhouse Act 1847 or the Bathwick Church Act 1847	10 & 11 Vict. c. ccl	22 July 1847
An Act to repeal an Act passed in the Fifty-fifth Year of His late Majesty King George the Third, (Note: Bathwick Parish Church and Workhouse Act 1815 (55 Geo. 3. c. xcvi)) for building a new Church and also a Workhouse in the Parish of Bathwick in the County of Somerset, and another Act passed in the Fifty-seventh Year of His said late Majesty (Note: Bathwick Parish Church and Workhouse Act 1817 (57 Geo. 3. c. xix)) to amend the said Act, and to provide for the future Administration and Exercise of the Trusts and Powers thereby respectively created.
Lytham Improvement Act 1847 (repealed)	10 & 11 Vict. c. ccli	22 July 1847
An Act for paving, lighting, watching, draining, cleansing, regulating, and otherwise improving the Town of Lytham in the County Palatine of Lancaster, for supplying the Inhabitants thereof with Water, and for establishing and regulating a Market and Market Places therein. (Repealed by Lytham St. Anne's Corporation Act 1923 (13 & 14 Geo. 5. c. lxxxvi))
Tunstall Improvement Act 1847 (repealed)	10 & 11 Vict. c. cclii	22 July 1847
An Act for paving, lighting, watching, cleansing, and otherwise improving the Town and Neighbourhood of Tunstall in the County of Stafford, and for improving and regulating the Market Place and Markets therein. (Repealed by Local Government Board's Provisional Order Confirmation (No. 3) Act 1908 (8 Edw. 7. c. clxiv))
Rathmines Improvement Act 1847	10 & 11 Vict. c. ccliii	22 July 1847
An Act for better paving, cleansing, draining, regulating, lighting, and improving the District of Rathmines, Mount Pleasant, Ranelagh, Cullenswood, Milltown, Rathgar, and Haroldscross, and such other Portions of the Parish of Saint Peter within the Barony of Uppercross in the County of Dublin, and for otherwise promoting the Health and Convenience of the Inhabitants.
Belfast Improvement Act 1847	10 & 11 Vict. c. ccliv	22 July 1847
An Act for the further Improvement of the Borough of Belfast.
Blackburn Improvement Act 1847 (repealed)	10 & 11 Vict. c. cclv	22 July 1847
An Act for improving the Streets and public Places, and erecting a Town Hall, and improving the Markets, in the Township of Blackburn in the County Palatine of Lancaster. (Repealed by Blackburn Improvement Act 1854 (17 & 18 Vict. c. clxxxiii))
Saint Ives (Hunts) Improvement Act 1847 or the St. Ives (Huntingdonshire) Improvement Act 1847	10 & 11 Vict. c. cclvi	22 July 1847
An Act for paving, lighting, watching, draining, cleansing, and improving the Town of Saint Ives and the Neighbourhood thereof in the County of Huntingdon.
Portsmouth Improvement Act 1847 (repealed)	10 & 11 Vict. c. cclvii	22 July 1847
An Act for paving, lighting, cleansing, watering, regulating, and otherwise improving the Town of Portsmouth in the County of Southampton, and for removing and preventing Nuisances and Annoyances therein. (Repealed by Portsmouth Corporation Act 1920 (10 & 11 Geo. 5. c. lxviii))
Bingley Improvement Act 1847 (repealed)	10 & 11 Vict. c. cclviii	22 July 1847
An Act for lighting, paving, cleansing, sewering, draining, regulating, and improving the Town and Neighbourhood of Bingley in the West Riding of the County of York, and for other Purposes connected therewith. (Repealed by West Yorkshire Act 1980 (c. xiv))
Wexford Free Bridge Act 1847	10 & 11 Vict. c. cclix	22 July 1847
An Act for constructing and maintaining a Bridge across the River Slaney near the Town of Wexford, with Approaches, and for taking down the present Bridge there.
Swansea Harbour Amendment Act 1847 (repealed)	10 & 11 Vict. c. cclx	22 July 1847
An Act to amend the several Acts relating to Swansea Harbour. (Repealed by Swansea Harbour Act 1854 (17 & 18 Vict. c. cxxvi))
Liverpool Corporation Waterworks Act 1847	10 & 11 Vict. c. cclxi	22 July 1847
An Act for better supplying with Water the Borough of Liverpool and the Neighbourhood thereof, and for authorizing the Mayor, Aldermen, and Burgesses of the said Borough to purchase the Liverpool and Harrington Waterworks and Liverpool Waterworks.
Leeds Waterworks Act 1847	10 & 11 Vict. c. cclxii	22 July 1847
An Act for better supplying with Water the Inhabitants of the Town and Neighbourhood of Leeds in the County of York.
Tyne Docks Act 1847 (repealed)	10 & 11 Vict. c. cclxiii	22 July 1847
An Act for making Docks at Jarrow Slake in the River Tyne. (Repealed by Jarrow Dock and Railway Act 1854 (17 & 18 Vict. c. clxiv))
Birkenhead Docks Act 1847 (repealed)	10 & 11 Vict. c. cclxiv	22 July 1847
An Act to authorize the Birkenhead Dock Commissioners to construct an additional Dock and other Works at Birkenhead in the County of Chester, and for other Purposes. (Repealed by Mersey Dock Acts Consolidation Act 1858 (21 & 22 Vict. c. xcii))
Birkenhead Docks (Wallasey Pool) Act 1847 (repealed)	10 & 11 Vict. c. cclxv	22 July 1847
An Act to alter and amend the Acts relating to the Birkenhead Commissioners Docks, and to make further Provision with respect to the Construction of the Sea or Wharf Walls along Wallasey Pool; and for other Purposes. (Repealed by Mersey Dock Acts Consolidation Act 1858 (21 & 22 Vict. c. xcii))
Leominster Canal Sale Act 1847	10 & 11 Vict. c. cclxvi	22 July 1847
An Act for authorizing the sale of the Leominster Canal, and other Property of the Company of Proprietors of the Leominster Canal Navigation, and for winding up and adjusting the Concerns of the same Company.
Lincolnshire Drainage Act 1847	10 & 11 Vict. c. cclxvii	22 July 1847
An Act for the better Drainage of Lands called Crowland Washes and Fodder Lots, Cowbit Wash, and Deeping Fen Wash, in the several Parishes of Crowland, Spalding, and Pinchbeck, the Hamlets of Cowbit and Peakhill, and the extra-parochial Place or Lands called Deeping Fen, or Deeping Fen Welland Washes, all in the County of Lincoln.
Liverpool and London Fire and Life Insurance Company Act 1847 (repealed)	10 & 11 Vict. c. cclxviii	22 July 1847
An Act to change the Name of the Liverpool Fire and Life Insurance Company, and for other Purposes relating thereto. (Repealed by Liverpool and London and Globe Insurance Company's Act 1904 (4 Edw. 7. c. xxxiv))
National Mercantile Life Assurance Society Act 1847	10 & 11 Vict. c. cclxix	22 July 1847
An Act to enable the National Mercantile Life Assurance Society to sue and be sued in the Name of a Nominal Party, and for other Purposes relating to the said Company.
Coventry, Nuneaton, Birmingham and Leicester Railway Act 1847	10 & 11 Vict. c. cclxx	22 July 1847
An Act to enable the Coventry, Nuneaton, Birmingham, and Leicester Railway Company to sell and transfer their Railway, Works, and Interests to the London and North-western, Midland Railway Companies, or either of them; and for other Purposes.
Saint Helen's Canal and Railway Act 1847 or the St. Helens Canal and Railway Act 1847	10 & 11 Vict. c. cclxxi	22 July 1847
An Act to enable the Saint Helen's Canal and Railway Company to make Branch Railways to Warrington and to Blackbrook, and to make certain Alterations in their Railway, and also to take a Lease of the Rainford Branch of the London and North-western Railway.
Great Northern Railway (Hertford, Hatfield and St. Albans Branch) Act 1847	10 & 11 Vict. c. cclxxii	22 July 1847
An Act to enable the Great Northern Railway Company to make a Railway from St. Alban's to the Great Northern Railway at Hatfield, and thence to the Town of Hertford.
Taw Vale Railway and Dock Act 1847	10 & 11 Vict. c. cclxxiii	22 July 1847
An Act for making a Deviation in the Line of the Taw Vale Railway, for making Branches therefrom to the Towns of Bideford and South Moulton, for enlarging the Dock, and for amending the Acts relating thereto.
Edinburgh and Northern Railway (Improvement of the Ferry between Ferry-Port-on-Craig and the North Shore of the River Tay) Act 1847	10 & 11 Vict. c. cclxxiv	22 July 1847
An Act to enable the Edinburgh and Northern Railway Company to improve the Ferry between Ferry-Port-on-Craig and the North Shore of the River Tay.
East Anglian Railways Act 1847 (repealed)	10 & 11 Vict. c. cclxxv	22 July 1847
An Act for consolidating the Lynn and Ely, the Ely and Huntingdon, and the Lynn and Dereham Railway Companies into One Company, to be called "The East Anglian Railways Company." (Repealed by Great Eastern Railway Act 1862 (25 & 26 Vict. c. ccxxiii))
London Bridge Railway Termini General Enlargement Act 1847	10 & 11 Vict. c. cclxxvi	22 July 1847
An Act for enlarging the present Station of the London, Brighton, and South Coast Railway Company at or near London Bridge, and for the Division of the present Station between the London, Brighton, and South Coast and the South-eastern Railway Companies, for the separate Accommodation of the Traffic of such Two Railway Companies.
Edinburgh and Northern Railway (St. Andrews and Newburgh Harbour Branches and Road Crossings, Newport Railway Extension) Act 1847	10 & 11 Vict. c. cclxxvii	22 July 1847
An Act to enable the Edinburgh and Northern Rail way Company to construct Branch Railways to Saint Andrew's and Newburgh Harbour, and to divert and alter the Levels of certain Turnpike Roads in the Line of the Newport Railway Extension.
London and North Western Railway, Branch from Kenilworth to Berkswell, and Leamington to Coventry Railway Enlargement Act 1847	10 & 11 Vict. c. cclxxviii	22 July 1847
An Act to empower the London and North-western Railway Company to make a certain Branch Railway from Kenilworth to Berkswell, and to widen the line from Leamington to Coventry, all in the County of Warwick; and for other Purposes.
Manchester, Sheffield and Lincolnshire Railway Act 1847	10 & 11 Vict. c. cclxxix	22 July 1847
An Act to enable the Manchester, Sheffield, and Lincolnshire Railway Company to sell the Water not required for their Canals called the Peak Forest Canal and Macclesfield Canal, and to make additional Works in connexion with such Canals.
London (City) Improvement Act 1847	10 & 11 Vict. c. cclxxx	22 July 1847
An Act for widening and improving Cannon Street, and for making a new Street from the West End of Cannon Street to Queen Street, and for widening and improving Queen Street, and for effecting other Improvements in the City of London.
Colchester Town, Port and Navigation Act 1847 (repealed)	10 & 11 Vict. c. cclxxxi	22 July 1847
An Act to amend an Act for improving the Navigation from the Hythe at Colchester to Wivenhoe in the County of Essex, and for better paving, lighting, and improving the Town of Colchester; and for making a new Channel and deepening the river Colne from Wivenhoe to Lamb's Hard leading towards the Sea. (Repealed by Colchester Borough Council Act 2001 (c. ii))
Leicester Waterworks Act 1847	10 & 11 Vict. c. cclxxxii	22 July 1847
An Act for better supplying with Water the Inhabitants of the Borough of Leicester, and certain Parishes and Places adjacent thereto, in the County of Leicester.
Kingston-upon-Hull Dock Act 1847	10 & 11 Vict. c. cclxxxiii	22 July 1847
An Act for removing Doubts as to the Purchase of Lands by the Dock Company at Kingston-upon-Hull in certain Cases.
Stockport Improvement Act 1847	10 & 11 Vict. c. cclxxxiv	22 July 1847
An Act to purchase and define the Manorial and Market Rights of Stockport, to establish public Parks, to purchase or lease Waterworks, to build Bridges, and to make other Communications within the Borough of Stockport.
Wolverhampton General Cemetery Act 1847	10 & 11 Vict. c. cclxxxv	22 July 1847
An Act for establishing a general Cemetery at Wolverhampton in the County of Stafford, and for making certain direct Roads and Approaches to the said Cemetery from the Town of Wolverhampton and the Neighbourhood thereof.
Great Northern Railway (Sutton Branch) Act 1847	10 & 11 Vict. c. cclxxxvi	22 July 1847
An Act to enable the Great Northern Railway Company to make a Branch Railway near Sutton in Lincolnshire.
Great Northern Railway (Deviations between London and Grantham) Act 1847	10 & 11 Vict. c. cclxxxvii	22 July 1847
An Act to enable the Great Northern Railway Company to make certain Alterations in the Line and Levels of their Railway between London and the Neighbourhood of Grantham.
East Lancashire Railway (Deviations and Rawtenstall Coal Branch) Act 1847	10 & 11 Vict. c. cclxxxviii	22 July 1847
An Act to enable the East Lancashire Railway Company to alter the Line and Levels of their Railway, and to make a Branch Railway therefrom; and for other Purposes relating thereto.
East Lancashire Railway (Preston Extension) Act 1847	10 & 11 Vict. c. cclxxxix	22 July 1847
An Act to enable the East Lancashire Railway Company to extend the Liverpool, Ormskirk, and Preston, and the Blackburn and Preston Lines of their Railway, into Preston; and for other Purposes relating thereto.
Northern Counties Union Railway Deviation Act 1847	10 & 11 Vict. c. ccxc	22 July 1847
An Act to enable the Northern Counties Union Railway Company to make certain Alterations in their Railway in the Parishes of Aysgarth and Wensley in the North Riding of the County of York.
South Yorkshire, Doncaster and Goole Railway Act 1847	10 & 11 Vict. c. ccxci	22 July 1847
An Act for making several Lines of Railway between Penistone, Barnsley, Elsecar, and Doncaster, in the West Riding of Yorkshire, to be called "The South Yorkshire, Doncaster, and Goole Railway;" and for authorizing the Purchase of Part of the Sheffield, Rotherham, Barnsley, Wakefield, Huddersfield, and Goole Railway, and of the Dun Navigation and Dearne and Dove Canal.
Wear Valley Railway Act 1847	10 & 11 Vict. c. ccxcii	22 July 1847
An Act for enabling the Wear Valley Railway Company to purchase or lease the Bishop Auckland and Weardale Railway, the Wear and Derwent Railway, the Weardale Extension Railway, and the Shildon Tunnel, and to raise an additional Sum of Money; and for other Purposes.
Newbury Cemetery Act 1847 (repealed)	10 & 11 Vict. c. ccxciii	22 July 1847
An Act for establishing a general Cemetery for the Interment of the Dead in the Parish of Newbury near the Town of Newbury in the County of Berks. (Repealed by Newbury Corporation Act 1953 (1 & 2 Eliz. 2. c. xiii))
Widnes and Prescot Brook Colliery Branches Act 1847	10 & 11 Vict. c. ccxciv	22 July 1847
An Act to empower the London and North-western Railway Company to make divers Branch Railways in the County of Lancaster; and for other Purposes.
Llynvi Valley Railway Act 1847 (repealed)	10 & 11 Vict. c. ccxcv	22 July 1847
An Act for the Consolidation of the Duffryn Llynvi and Porth Cawl Railway Company with the Llynvi Valley Railway Company. (Repealed by Llynvi Valley Railway Act 1855 (18 & 19 Vict. c. l))
Timber Preserving Company's Act 1847	10 & 11 Vict. c. ccxcvi	22 July 1847
An Act for forming and regulating "The Timber Preserving Company;" and to enable the said Company to purchase and work certain Letters Patent.
Sutton Harbour Act 1847	10 & 11 Vict. c. ccxcvii	23 July 1847
An Act for improving and regulating the Harbour of Sutton Pool within the Port of Plymouth in the County of Devon.

=== Private acts ===
Short title	Citation	Royal assent
Long title
McLeod's (Dalkeith Glebe) Estate Act 1847	10 & 11 Vict. c. 1 Pr.	8 June 1847
An Act to enable the Minister of the Parish of Dalkeith, in the County of Edinburgh, to feu his Glebe Lands, lying in the said Parish.
Cleveland Square, Saint James, Westminster Improvement (Archbishop of York's Estate) Act 1847	10 & 11 Vict. c. 2 Pr.	8 June 1847
An Act to empower the Devisees of the Most noble Francis Duke of Bridgewater, deceased, to appropriate to Building Purposes a Portion of Cleveland-square, in the Parish of Saint James, Westminster, and to improve the Approaches thereto.
Doddington Rectory Division Act 1847	10 & 11 Vict. c. 3 Pr.	8 June 1847
An Act to divide the Parish and Rectory of Doddington, otherwise Dornington, into three separate and distinct Parishes and Rectories, and to endow the same out of the Revenues of that Rectory, and to make Provision for the further Division of such Rectories and Parishes, and for other Purposes connected therewith.
Terrington Inclosure Act 1847	10 & 11 Vict. c. 4 Pr.	21 June 1847
An Act for dividing, allotting and inclosing certain Open Marshes and Waste Lands in the Township of Terrington, in the County of Norfolk.
Wyndham's Estate Act 1847	10 & 11 Vict. c. 5 Pr.	2 July 1847
An Act for facilitating the Proof of the Will of the Right honourable George Obrien late Earl of Egrenzont and Baron of Cockermouth, in certain Actions in Ireland.
Long's Estate Act 1847	10 & 11 Vict. c. 6 Pr.	2 July 1847
An Act for exchanging Freehold Estates belonging to Robert Kellett Long, Esquire, for Freehold Estates settled by the Will of Robert Churchman Long, deceased, and for authorizing the leasing of the settled Estates.
Poyntzfield's Estate Act 1847	10 & 11 Vict. c. 7 Pr.	2 July 1847
An Act for exchanging certain detached Portions situate in the County of Sutherland, of the entailed Estate of Poyntzfield, belonging to Sir George Gun Munro, Knight, for the Lands of Udale, situate in the County of Cronzarty, belonging to James Matheson, Esquire, contiguous to the said Estate of Poyntzfield, and for securing the Purchase of other Lands to be entailed, and to form, along with the said Lands of Udale, Parts of the said entailed Estate of Poyntzfield.
Horne's (Ferguson's) Estate Act 1847	10 & 11 Vict. c. 8 Pr.	2 July 1847
An Act to rectify an Error in an Act of the last Session, intituled, "An Act to enable the Trustees appointed by Mrs. Jane Ferguson, deceased, to sell the Lands of Laverocklaw, and also certain Subjects situate in the Village of Ormiston, vested in them in Trust, and to apply the Price to be obtained, and certain Trust Monies in their hands, in the Purchase of other Lands for the Purposes of the said Trust." (Note: Horne's (Ferguson's) Estate Act 1846 (9 & 10 Vict. c. 33 Pr.))
Hodgson Hinde's Estate Act 1847	10 & 11 Vict. c. 9 Pr.	2 July 1847
An Act for exchanging Hereditaments subject to Uses declared by the Will of Anthony Compton, Esquire, deceased, for Hereditaments belonging to the Right honourable Henry Earl Grey, for selling and exchanging other Hereditaments subject to the same Uses, and for investing the Net Proceeds to arise from such Sales and Exchanges in the Purchase of other Hereditaments to be settled to the same Uses, and to authorize the granting of Leases of Part of the Hereditaments subject to the Uses of the said Will.
Legh's Estate Act 1847	10 & 11 Vict. c. 10 Pr.	2 July 1847
An Act to enable Edward Legh, and Mary Anne, his Wife, and others, to make and authorize Sales, Exchanges, and also Building and other Leases of Estates at Newington, otherwise Newington Lucies, and Lewisham respectively, in the County of Kent, and for other Purposes.
Duke of Richmond's Estate Act 1847	10 & 11 Vict. c. 11 Pr.	22 July 1847
An Act to enable Charles Gordon, Duke of Richmond and Lennox, to borrow a certain Sum of Money upon the Security of his entailed Estates, for repayment to him of a Portion of the Monies laid out by him in the Improvement of these Estates.
Earl of Devon's Estate Act 1847	10 & 11 Vict. c. 12 Pr.	22 July 1847
An Act for enabling certain Estates in Ireland of the Right honourable William Earl of Devon, deceased, to be sold, and the Proceeds arising therefrom, after payment of certain Charges and Incumbrances, to be applied in payment or towards reduction of the Charges and Incumbrances affecting the Family and other Estates in England, late of the said Earl of Devon, and for authorizing the raising by Mortgage of the Estates in Ireland, until sold, of a limited Sum of Money, to be applied under the Direction of the High Court of Chancery in England, in or towards permanently improving the said Estates in Ireland, and for making Provision for the Liquidation and Payment of the principal Monies and Interest, and for other Purposes.
Earl of Dudley's Estate Act 1847	10 & 11 Vict. c. 13 Pr.	22 July 1847
An Act for enabling the Sale and Conveyance of certain Cottages, Gardens and other improved Lands comprised in the Will of the Right honourable John William, Earl of Dudley, deceased, and for laying out the Sale Monies in the Purchase of Estates to be settled to the Uses of the said Will, and for other Purposes.
Earl of Strathmore's Estate Act 1847 (repealed)	10 & 11 Vict. c. 14 Pr.	22 July 1847
An Act for authorizing the Sale and Exchange of certain Lands, Collieries, Hereditaments and Mining Stock, forming Part of the Estate of John Bowes, late Earl of Strathmore, and for enabling the Trustees to shift the Charges affecting the Inheritance of the same Lands and Hereditaments, and for other Purposes. (Repealed by Earl of Strathmore's Estate Act 1850 (13 & 14 Vict. c. 18 Pr.))
Huggens's College, Northfleet Act 1847	10 & 11 Vict. c. 15 Pr.	22 July 1847
An Act to incorporate the President and Trustees of Huygens' College at Northfleet, in the County of Kent, and to enable them the better to carry on the charitable Designs of the said College.
Dollar Institution Act 1847	10 & 11 Vict. c. 16 Pr.	22 July 1847
An Act to increase the Number of Trustees for the Management of the Dollar Institution, or John McNabb's School, and to incorporate the Trustees.
Goddard's Estate Act 1847	10 & 11 Vict. c. 17 Pr.	22 July 1847
An Act for enabling Conveyances to be made of the Estate and Interest of Elizabeth Goddard (who is of unsound Mind), in Lands and Tenements, a Partition or Division whereof is directed by a Decree of the High Court of Chancery, made in a Cause "Whitmore v. Goddard."
Hylton's Estate Act 1847	10 & 11 Vict. c. 18 Pr.	22 July 1847
An Act to authorize the Sale of an Estate called Morrant's Court, otherwise Morant's Court, otherwise Madam's Court, in the County of Kent, late the Property of John Fry, Esquire, deceased, and for applying the Monies to arise oy such Sale in Payment of Incumbrances affecting the said Estate, and for investing the Residue of such Monies for the Benefit of the Parties beneficially interested in the said Estate.
Paterson's Estate Act 1847	10 & 11 Vict. c. 19 Pr.	22 July 1847
An Act for exonerating the Trustees of the deceased George Paterson, of Castle Handy, Esquire, the Elder, of their Expenditure in making Improvements upon the Entailed Estates left by him, for enabling them to acquire certain Lands contiguous thereto, and to grant Feus, and for certain other Purposes.
Dundas's Estate Act 1847	10 & 11 Vict. c. 20 Pr.	22 July 1847
An Act for authorizing the Sale of so much of the entailed Lands and Estates of Dundas, in the County of Linlithgow, belonging to James Dundas, Esquire, as may be required to pay the Debts affecting or that may be made to affect the said Estates, and for enabling the said James Dundas to borrow Money upon the Security of the said Lands and Estates, fur Repayment of a Portion of the Monies laid out in the Improvement of the said Lands and Estates, and in building a Mansion-House and Offices for the same.
Oldmixon's (or Lyon's) Estate Act 1847	10 & 11 Vict. c. 21 Pr.	22 July 1847
An Act for authorizing the granting of a New Lease of certain Coal Mines and Hereditaments, in the County of Durham, late the Estate of John Lyon, Esquire, deceased.
Gillespie's Estate Act 1847	10 & 11 Vict. c. 22 Pr.	22 July 1847
An Act to vest in Trustees certain Lands in the Vicinity of Glasgow which belonged to the late Colin Gillespie, for the Purpose of selling a Portion thereof to pay off the Debt affecting the same, and of partitioning and fencing out the Remainder for the Benefit of his Heirs.
Newbart (or Gravenor's) Estate Act 1847	10 & 11 Vict. c. 23 Pr.	22 July 1847
An Act for extending the Time for enrolling (pursuant to the Statute 3 and 4 Will. 4., cap. 74,) (Note: Fines and Recoveries Act 1833 (3 & 4 Will. 4. c. 74)) a Deed executed in the Colony of New South Wales, for the purpose of enlarging a Base Fee in Hereditaments at Messingham, in the County of Lincoln, into an Estate in Fee Simple.
Company of Proprietors of Northam Bridge and Roads Act 1847 (repealed)	10 & 11 Vict. c. 24 Pr.	22 July 1847
An Act for vesting in the Company of Proprietors of Northam Bridge and Roads certain Lands in the Town and County of Southampton, and in the County of Southampton, and for empowering them to sell the same. (Repealed by Southampton Corporation Act 1928 (18 & 19 Geo. 5. c. cviii))
Sir Henry Willoughby Rooke's Estate Act 1847	10 & 11 Vict. c. 25 Pr.	22 July 1847
An Act for enabling the Trustees of the Will of George Charles Rooke, Esquire, deceased, to carry into effect a Contract for the Purchase of the Life Estate and Interest of Hannah Rooke, Widow, in the Real and Personal Estates of the said George Charles Rooke, respectively devised and bequeathed by his Will, and for raising Money for that Purpose, and for Payment of the Debts of the said George Charles Rooke, and of the Legacies and Arrears of Annuities bequeathed by his said Will, and for other Purposes incidental thereto.
Penson's Estate Act 1847	10 & 11 Vict. c. 26 Pr.	22 July 1847
An Act for enabling Leases, Sales and Partitions to be made of certain Estates in the County Palatine of Lancaster, heretofore belonging to John Penson, and Molly, his Wife.
Leeds Free Grammar School Estate Act 1847	10 & 11 Vict. c. 27 Pr.	22 July 1847
An Act to enable the Trustees of a Charity called the Leeds Free Grammar School to sell Parts of the Trust Estates belonging to the said Charity, and to purchase other Lands for the Uses and Purposes of the said Charity, and for other Purposes.
Westminster Abbey Estate Act 1847	10 & 11 Vict. c. 28 Pr.	22 July 1847
An Act to empower the Dean and Chapter of Westminster to sell and exchange certain Lands and Hereditaments in the Parishes of Paddington and Saint George, Hanover-square, in the County of Middlesex, and to lay out the Monies to arise from such Sale in the Purchase of other Lands and Hereditaments, and for other Purposes.
Lord Macdonald and Bosville's Estate Act 1847	10 & 11 Vict. c. 29 Pr.	22 July 1847
An Act to vest certain Estates in the County of York, in England, in Alexander William Robert Bosville and Godfrey Wentworth Bayard Bosville, and in Skye and North Uist in Scotland, in the Right honourable Godfrey William Wentworth Lord Macdonald, and to enable the said Lord Macdonald to sell Part of the said Estates in Scotland for the Payment of Debts, and for other Purposes.
Pickernell's Estate Act 1847	10 & 11 Vict. c. 30 Pr.	22 July 1847
An Act for authorizing the Sale to the Right honourable William Baron Ward of certain Freehold and Copyhold Hereditaments, in the County of Worcester, devised by the Will of Thomas Pickernell, Esquire, deceased, and for directing the Investment of the Purchase-Money in other Hereditaments to be settled in like manner.
Mansell's Estate Act 1847	10 & 11 Vict. c. 31 Pr.	22 July 1847
An Act for authorizing Leases to be granted for quarrying and mining Purposes of certain Estates in the Isle of Purbeck, in the County of Dorset, subject to the Uses of the Will of Maria Sophia Richards, Spinster, deceased.
Tunstall Market Company (Dissolution) Act 1847 (repealed)	10 & 11 Vict. c. 32 Pr.	22 July 1847
An Act for enabling the Tunstall Market Company to sell their Estate, and wind-up their Concerns, and for dissolving the Company. (Repealed by Staffordshire Act 1983 (c. xviii))
Sir John St. Aubyn's Estate Act 1847	10 & 11 Vict. c. 33 Pr.	22 July 1847
An Act to enable the Trustees and Executors of the Will and Codicil of Sir John Saint Aubyn, Baronet, deceased, to raise a Sum of Money towards the Liquidation of his Debts by Mortgage of his Devised Estates in the County of Devon, instead of selling certain Leasehold Hereditaments in the County of Cornwall, and to enable the said Trustees to convey the Reversion in Fee Simple in the same Hereditaments vested in them for that Purpose, under the Will of the Reverend John Molesworth Saint Aubyn, deceased, to the Uses of the said Will and Codicil of the said Sir John Saint Aubyn, so as to convert such Leaseholds into a Fee Simple Estate in Possession, and for other Purposes.
Holy Jesus Hospital, Newcastle-upon-Tyne Act 1847 or the Holy Jesus Hospital Act 1847 (repealed)	10 & 11 Vict. c. 34 Pr.	23 July 1847
An Act for the better Support, and better Regulation of the Hospital of the Holy Jesus, founded in the Manors, in the Town and County of Newcastle-upon-Tyne, at the Costs and Charges of the Mayor and Burgesses of the Town of Newcastle-upon-Tyne, in the County of the Town of Newcastle-upon-Tyne aforesaid, and for confirming Sales and other Dispositions made of Estates formerly part of the Possessions of the said Hospital, and for other Purposes; and for repealing an Act of the last Session of Parliament (Note: Jesus Hospital (Newcastle) Estate Act 1846 (9 & 10 Vict. c. 39 Pr.)) for the same Purposes. (Repealed by Statute Law (Repeals) Act 2013 (c. 2))
Passingham's Estate Act 1847	10 & 11 Vict. c. 35 Pr.	23 July 1847
An Act to authorize the Construction of a Canal on the Estates devised by the Will of the late Mr. Jonathan Passingham, for the Transport of Bricks manufactured on such Estates, and to enable the Trustees of the Will to complete the Purchase of an adjoining Estate contracted for by them, and for other Purposes.
Martin's Divorce Act 1847 (Note: This act was not printed by the Queen's Printer.)	10 & 11 Vict. c. 36 Pr.	8 June 1847
An Act to dissolve the Marriage of Robert Montgomery Martin, Esquire, with Jane Avis Frances Martin, his now Wife, and to enable him to marry again, and for other Purposes therein mentioned.
Townshend Peerage Act 1847	10 & 11 Vict. c. 37 Pr.	25 June 1847
An Act to extend the Relief given by an Act of the sixth and seventh years of the reign of Her present Majesty, intituled, "An Act to declare that certain Persons therein mentioned are not Children of the Most honourable George Ferrars Marquess Townshend." (Note: Townshend Peerage Act 1843 (6 & 7 Vict. c. 35 Pr.))
Brooks's Divorce Act 1847	10 & 11 Vict. c. 38 Pr.	22 July 1847
An Act to dissolve the Marriage of Thomas Brooks with Mary, his now Wife, and to enable him to marry again, and for other Purposes.

=== Sources ===
- A Collection of the Public General Statutes passed in the Tenth and Eleventh Year of the Reign of Her Majesty Queen Victoria, 1847. London: Eyre and Spottiswoode. 1847 – via Internet Archive.
- A Collection of the Public General Statutes passed in the Tenth and Eleventh Year of the Reign of Her Majesty Queen Victoria, 1847. London: Eyre and Spottiswoode. 1847 – via Google Books.
- A Compendious Abstract of the Public General Acts of the United Kingdom of Great Britain and Ireland: 10 Victoriae—1847. Vol. 25. London: E. B. Ince. 1847 – via Google Books.
- Journals of the House of Commons (PDF). Vol. 102 – via parliament.uk.

== 11 & 12 Vict. ==
The first session of the 15th Parliament of the United Kingdom, which met from 18 November 1847 until 5 September 1848.

=== Public general acts ===
Short title	Citation	Royal assent
Long title
Public Works (Ireland) Act 1848 (repealed)	11 & 12 Vict. c. 1	20 December 1847
An Act to facilitate the Completion, in certain Cases, of Public Works in Ireland. (Repealed by Statute Law Revision Act 1875 (38 & 39 Vict. c. 66))
Prevention of Crime (Ireland) Act 1848 (repealed)	11 & 12 Vict. c. 2	20 December 1847
An Act for the better Prevention of Crime and Outrage in certain Parts of Ireland until the First Day of December One thousand eight hundred and forty-nine, and to the End of the then next Session of Parliament. (Repealed by Statute Law Revision Act 1891 (54 & 55 Vict. c. 67))
Railways Act 1848 (repealed)	11 & 12 Vict. c. 3	20 December 1847
An Act to give further Time for making certain Railways. (Repealed by Statute Law Revision Act 1875 (38 & 39 Vict. c. 66))

=== Sources ===
- A Collection of the Public General Statutes Passed in the Eleventh and Twelfth Years of the Reign of Her Majesty Queen Victoria, 1847-8. London: Eyre & Spottiswoode. 1848 – via Internet Archive.
- A Collection of the Public General Statutes Passed in the Eleventh and Twelfth Years of the Reign of Her Majesty Queen Victoria. London: Eyre & Spottiswoode. 1848 – via Google Books.
- Journals of the House of Commons (PDF). Vol. 102 – via parliament.uk.

== See also ==
- List of acts of the Parliament of the United Kingdom
