= Maryport =

Town in Cumbria, England

Coordinates: 54.7128°N 3.4926°W

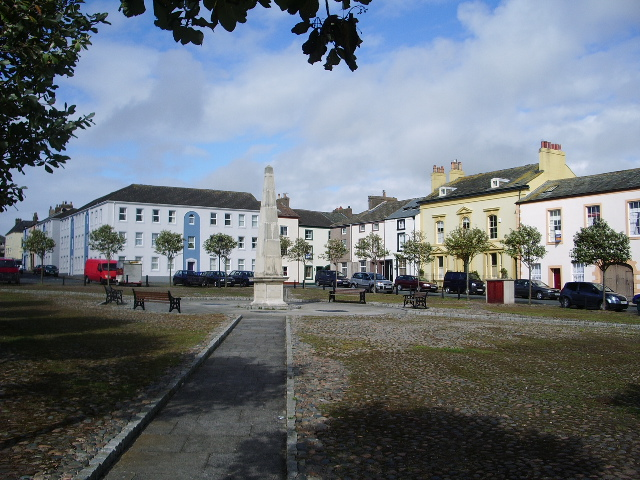
- Fleming Square, Maryport

- Location within Cumbria
- Population: 10,865 (Parish, 2021); 8,525 (Built up area, 2021)
- OS grid reference: NY038363
- Civil parish: Maryport
- Unitary authority: Cumberland
- Ceremonial county: Cumbria
- Region: North West
- Country: England
- Sovereign state: United Kingdom
- Post town: MARYPORT
- Postcode district: CA15
- Dialling code: 01900
- Police: Cumbria
- Fire: Cumbria
- Ambulance: North West
- UK Parliament: Penrith and Solway

Maryport is a town and civil parish in the Cumberland district of Cumbria, England. The town is on the coast of the Solway Firth and lies at the northern end of the former Cumberland Coalfield. Maryport lies approximately 5 miles (8 km) north-west of the Lake District National Park. It includes the site of the Roman settlement of Alauna. The modern town was developed from the mid-18th century around a new harbour built at the mouth of the River Ellen. The parish also includes the village of Flimby. At the 2021 census, the built-up area had a population of 8,525, while the parish had a population of 10,865.

== Location ==
Maryport is located on the A596 road 6 miles (10 km) north of Workington, 21.1 miles (34 km) west of Keswick and 26 miles (42 km) south-west of Carlisle. Silloth is 12.6 miles (20 km) to the north on the B5300 coast road, which passes through the villages of Allonby, Mawbray, Beckfoot and Blitterlees.

It is one of the southernmost towns on the Solway Firth, where the River Ellen skirts the grounds of Netherhall School before flowing through Maryport into the Solway Firth.

Maryport railway station is on the Cumbrian Coast Line.

== History ==
=== Prehistoric times ===
Evidence for Final Palaeolithic and Mesolithic occupation was found at Netherhall Road. This was the first located archaeological evidence of tuff exploitation in the Lake District.

=== Roman and medieval times ===
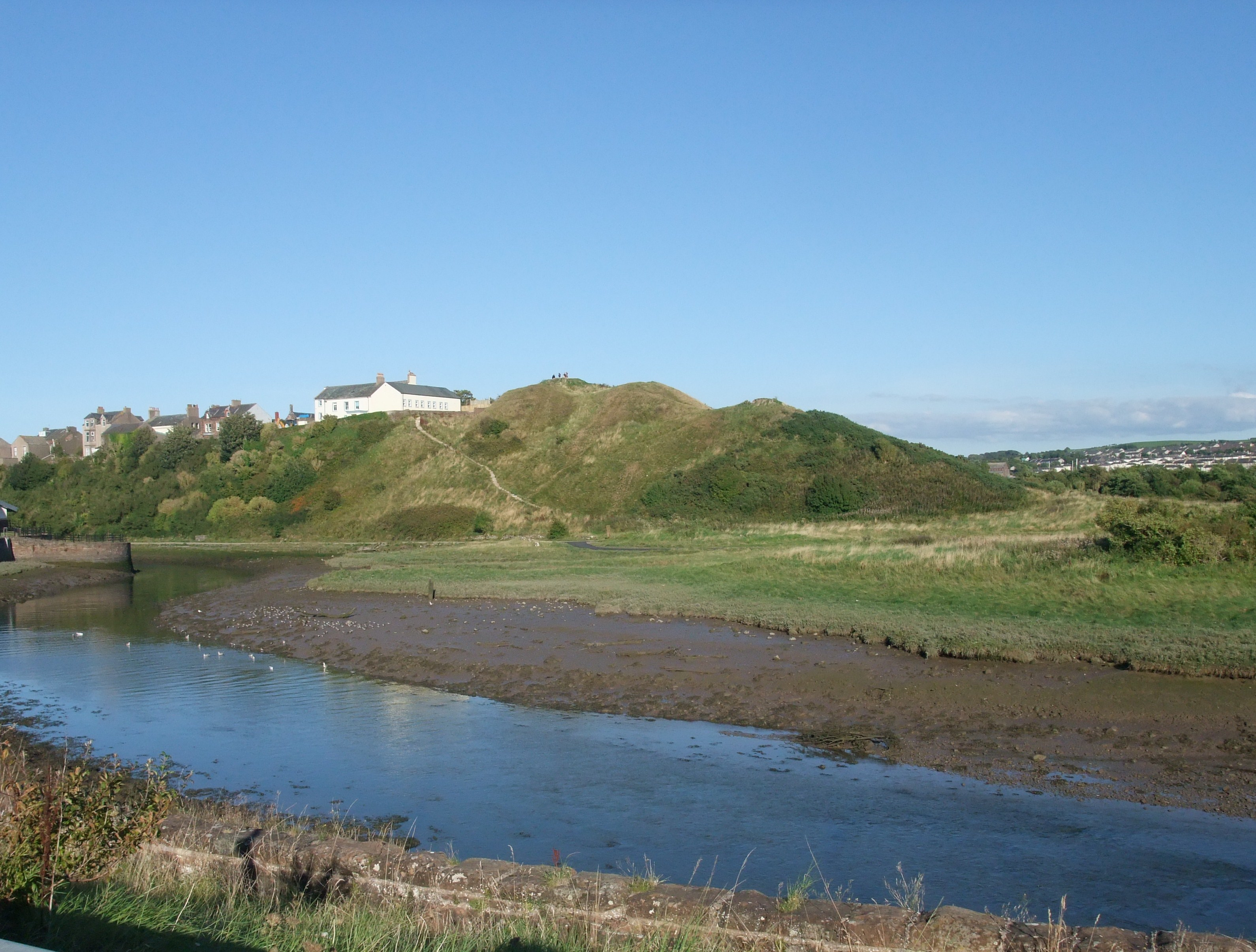
Maryport Castle Hill

The town was established around 122 AD as one of several Roman localities called Alauna. It was a command and supply base for the coastal defences at the western extremity of Hadrian's Wall. The town contains substantial remains of the Roman fort, which was the last in a series that stretched southwards along the coast from the wall to prevent it being avoided by crossing the Solway Firth. Geomagnetic surveys have revealed a large Roman town surrounding the fort. A Romano-British (native) settlement located directly beside the fort may even have supplied the fort with food, possibly in exchange for goods like pottery.

The Senhouse Roman Museum adjoins the site of Alauna, and has a replica wooden watch-tower overlooking the fort and the sea. The museum houses a large collection of Roman altar stones found at the site.

On Castle Hill are the earthworks and buried remains of a 12th-century motte-and-bailey castle. On the summit are the foundations of a World War II gun emplacement.

To the north are the ruins of Netherhall Estate. The only remains of this once grand manor are stables and a 14th-century pele tower, largely built of dressed Roman stones presumably from Alauna Roman fort nearby. The tower was formerly part of a large house of later date which was demolished in 1979 following a fire.

=== Georgian times ===
Maryport Harbour Act 1748
- Act of Parliament
- Parliament of Great Britain
- Long title: An Act for repairing, enlarging, and preserving, the Harbour of Ellenfoot, in the County of Cumberland.
- Citation: 22 Geo. 2. c. 6
- Territorial extent: Great Britain

Dates
- Royal assent: 22 March 1749
- Commencement: 25 March 1749 (Note: Section 1.)
- Expired: 25 March 1770
- Repealed: 24 July 1833
Other legislation
Amended by	Maryport Harbour Act 1756; Maryport Harbour Act 1791; Maryport Harbour Act 1812
Repealed by	Maryport Harbour and Improvement Act 1833

Status: Repealed

Text of statute as originally enacted

Maryport Harbour Act 1756
- Act of Parliament
- Parliament of Great Britain
- Long title: An Act for enlarging the Term and Powers granted by an Act passed in the Twenty-second Year of His present Majesty, for repairing, enlarging, and preserving, the Harbour of Ellenfoot, in the County of Cumberland.
- Citation: 29 Geo. 2. c. 57
- Territorial extent: Great Britain

Dates
- Royal assent: 9 March 1756
- Commencement: 13 November 1755 (Note: Start of session.)
- Repealed: 24 July 1833
Other legislation
Amends	Maryport Harbour Act 1748
Amended by	Maryport Harbour Act 1791; Maryport Harbour Act 1812
Repealed by	Maryport Harbour and Improvement Act 1833

Status: Repealed

Text of statute as originally enacted

Maryport Harbour Act 1791
- Act of Parliament
- Parliament of Great Britain
- Long title: An Act for enlarging the Term and Powers of two Acts, made one in the Twenty-second, and the other in the Twenty-ninth Year of the Reign of King George the Second, for repairing, enlarging, and preserving the Harbour of Mary Port, in the County of Cumberland.
- Citation: 31 Geo. 3. c. 23
- Territorial extent: Great Britain

Dates
- Royal assent: 11 April 1791
- Commencement: 10 August 1790
- Repealed: 24 July 1833
Other legislation
Amends	Maryport Harbour Act 1748; Maryport Harbour Act 1756
Amended by	Maryport Harbour Act 1812
Repealed by	Maryport Harbour and Improvement Act 1833

Status: Repealed

Text of statute as originally enacted

Maryport Harbour Act 1812
- Act of Parliament
- Parliament of the United Kingdom
- Long title: An Act for enlarging the Term and Powers of Three Acts of His late and present Majesty, for repairing the Harbour of Maryport in the County of Cumberland.
- Citation: 52 Geo. 3. c. xv
- Territorial extent: United Kingdom

Dates
- Royal assent: 20 March 1812
- Commencement: 20 March 1812 (Note: Section 9.)
- Repealed: 24 July 1833
Other legislation
Amends	Maryport Harbour Act 1748; Maryport Harbour Act 1756; Maryport Harbour Act 1791
Repealed by	Maryport Harbour and Improvement Act 1833

Status: Repealed

Text of statute as originally enacted

Maryport Harbour and Improvement Act 1833
- Act of Parliament
- Parliament of the United Kingdom
- Long title: An Act for better preserving the Harbour of Maryport, and for lighting and otherwise improving the Township of Maryport in the County of Cumberland.
- Citation: 3 & 4 Will. 4. c. cxiii
- Territorial extent: United Kingdom

Dates
- Royal assent: 24 July 1833
- Commencement: 24 July 1833 (Note: The Acts of Parliament (Commencement) Act 1793.)
- Repealed: 14 August 1866
Other legislation
Repeals/revokes	Maryport Harbour Act 1748; Maryport Harbour Act 1756; Maryport Harbour Act 1791; Maryport Harbour Act 1812
Repealed by	Maryport Improvement and Harbour Act 1866

Status: Repealed

Text of statute as originally enacted

The area was historically called Ellenfoot (meaning [settlement] at the foot of the river Ellen) but the name was changed by Humphrey Senhouse as he began developing the port and new town, following the example of Whitehaven. In 1749 an act of Parliament, the Maryport Harbour Act 1748 (22 Geo. 2. c. 6), was passed to allow the creation of the present town. Humphrey Senhouse named the new town after his wife Mary. The Senhouse family were landowners in the area and responsible for the development of the town and excavation of its Roman past. The family also had interests in the West Indies. In 1770, Humphrey Senhouse's son, William, was appointed Surveyor General of Customs in Barbados where he purchased a sugar plantation and managed another for Sir James Lowther of Whitehaven. William's brother, Joseph, had a coffee plantation in Dominica. Both men were considerable slave-owners.

It was during this period that the town's lighthouse was built.

=== Victorian times ===
Maryport Improvement and Harbour Act 1866
- Act of Parliament
- Parliament of the United Kingdom
- Long title: An Act for defining and extending the Powers of the Trustees of the District and Harbour of Maryport in the County of Cumberland; and for enabling them to improve the Streets and Buildings within the District, and to sewer and drain the same; to establish Waterworks, Gasworks, and Police; and for other Purposes.
- Citation: 29 & 30 Vict. c. ccxlv
- Territorial extent: United Kingdom

Dates
- Royal assent: 23 July 1866
- Commencement: 14 August 1866 (Note: Section 3. Fourth Tuesday following the passing of the act/)
Other legislation
Repeals/revokes	Maryport Harbour and Improvement Act 1833
Amended by	Maryport District and Harbour Act 1868; Maryport Improvement Act 1878; Maryport Harbour Act 1903; Maryport Harbour Act 1939; Cumbria Act 1982; Maryport Harbour Revision Order 2007
Relates to	Lands Clauses Consolidation Act 1845; Commissioners Clauses Act 1847; Land Clauses Consolidation Acts Amendment Act 1860; Maryport Harbour Act 1894

Status: Amended

Text of statute as originally enacted

Maryport Harbour Act 1894
- Act of Parliament
- Parliament of the United Kingdom
- Long title: An Act to incorporate Commissioners and to transfer to and vest in them the Harbour Undertaking of the Trustees for the District and Harbour of Maryport to alter the constitution of such Trustees and for other purposes.
- Citation: 57 & 58 Vict. c. cvi
- Territorial extent: United Kingdom

Dates
- Royal assent: 20 July 1894
- Commencement: 20 July 1894
Other legislation
Amends	Maryport District and Harbour Act 1868; Maryport Improvement (Harbour) Act 1879
Amended by	Maryport Harbour Act 1903; Maryport Harbour Act 1939
Relates to	Commissioners Clauses Act 1847; Maryport Improvement and Harbour Act 1866; Maryport Improvement (Harbour) Act 1882; Maryport Improvement (Harbour) Act 1884

Status: Amended

Text of statute as originally enacted

The town quickly developed as an industrial centre throughout the 19th century. An iron foundry opened and the port developed as did shipyards, such as Wood's yard and Ritson's yard, which was famous for launching ships broadside into the River Ellen because it was not wide enough to allow ships to be launched the usual way.

The Maryport and Carlisle Railway, opened in the 1840s, with George Stephenson as its engineer, made the transport of coal much easier. Large new mines were sunk in the Aspatria area and almost all their production passed through the port. In 1846, 213,152 tons of coal were shipped from Maryport and by 1857 this had risen to more than 340,000 tons. Much of the coal produced in the area was turned into coke for the local iron and steel industry. By 1890, the Allerdale Coal Company had thirty Beehive coke ovens working on its site at Buckhill, Broughton Moor.

In 1874, the owners announced a cut of 10% in the miners' wages. A strike began in the Aspatria pits and then the owners made a further cut of 15%. By December, the strike had spread to the whole area with 2,000 men involved. The strike lasted until March 1875. There was violence when some 'blacklegs' were assaulted and many colliers left the area to seek work elsewhere. In 1894, John Osmaston who operated the Dearham Colliery became insolvent and the bank took over his pits. Two groups of local miners formed co-operatives and leased the mines at Crosshow and Townhead from the Lowthers. They found it impossible to compete with the other wealthy coal-owners in a tight market and also had serious problems with drainage. This unique experiment ended in 1903 when both companies went into liquidation.

=== Modern times ===
Maryport Harbour Act 1903
- Act of Parliament
- Parliament of the United Kingdom
- Long title: An Act to incorporate a Company and authorise them to acquire the undertaking of the Commissioners for the harbour of Maryport and to construct a dock railways and works at and near Maryport and for other purposes.
- Citation: 3 Edw. 7. c. ccxii
- Territorial extent: United Kingdom

Dates
- Royal assent: 11 August 1903
- Commencement: 11 August 1903
- Repealed: 29 December 2007
Other legislation
Amends	Maryport Improvement and Harbour Act 1866; Maryport Harbour Act 1894
Repealed by	Maryport Harbour Revision Order 2007
Relates to	Lands Clauses Consolidation Act 1845; Companies Clauses Consolidation Act 1845; Railways Clauses Consolidation Act 1845; Harbours, Docks and Piers Clauses Act 1847; Land Clauses Consolidation Acts Amendment Act 1860; Railways Clauses Act 1863

Status: Repealed

Text of statute as originally enacted

Maryport Harbour Act 1939
- Act of Parliament
- Parliament of the United Kingdom
- Long title: An Act to make provision in regard to the finance of the commissioners for the Harbour of Maryport and for other purposes.
- Citation: 2 & 3 Geo. 6. c. xii
- Territorial extent: United Kingdom

Dates
- Royal assent: 27 March 1939
- Repealed: 29 December 2007
Other legislation
Amends	Maryport Improvement and Harbour Act 1866; Maryport District and Harbour Act 1868; Maryport Improvement (Harbour) Act 1879; Maryport Improvement (Harbour) Act 1882; Maryport Harbour Act 1894; Pier and Harbour Order (Maryport) Confirmation Act 1936
Amended by	Maryport Harbour Revision Order 2007

Status: Amended

Text of statute as originally enacted

Maryport Harbour Revision Order 2007 (Note: Section 1(1).)
- Statutory Instrument
- Parliament of the United Kingdom
- Citation: SI 2007/3463
- Territorial extent: United Kingdom

Dates
- Made: 6 December 2007
- Commencement: 29 December 2007 (Note: Section 1(2).)
Other legislation
Amends	Maryport Improvement and Harbour Act 1866; Maryport Harbour Act 1903; Maryport Harbour Act 1939
Repeals/revokes	Maryport Improvement (Harbour) Act 1879; Maryport Improvement (Harbour) Act 1882; Maryport Improvement (Harbour) Act 1884; Maryport Harbour Act 1903; Maryport Railways and Docks Act 1906; Pier and Harbour Order (Maryport) Confirmation Act 1936
Made under	Harbours Act 1964
Relates to	Harbours, Docks, and Piers Clauses Act 1847

Status: Current legislation

Text of statute as originally enacted

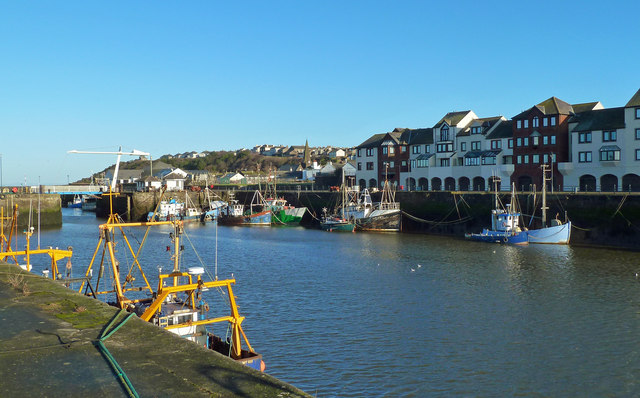
Maryport Harbour

During the early years of the 20th century, trade in the docks remained steady but was badly affected by the 1926 General Strike. Then, in 1927, a new deep-water dock was opened in Workington. Previously, the Workington Iron and Steel works had imported much of their raw material through Maryport but all of this trade was immediately transferred to the new facility. The local Solway Blast Furnaces also closed.

Maryport became a ghost town. The government declared West Cumberland a ‘Special Area' but, by 1933, 57.3% of the town's insured workforce was unemployed. 1,684 men were out of work. Maryport was “for the most part, living on public funds”. In 1936 twenty unemployed men marched from Maryport to join the Jarrow Crusade to London. Known as the Maryport Marchers, they were joined by two marchers from Cleator Moor and two marchers from Frizington. The Maryport Marchers Council organised this.

Despite a minor boom during the Second World War, when coal from North East England was diverted to the port, Maryport never recovered. The docks were closed to cargo ships in the 1960s. The last deep pit in the area, at Risehow, closed in 1966.

Today, after a series of major regeneration projects such as the yacht marina in the local harbour, prospects for the town are starting to look better. It is expected that tourism will play a major role in the future of the town.

In October 2018, it was announced that the Netherhall School community swimming pool was to close.

== Maryport Lighthouse ==
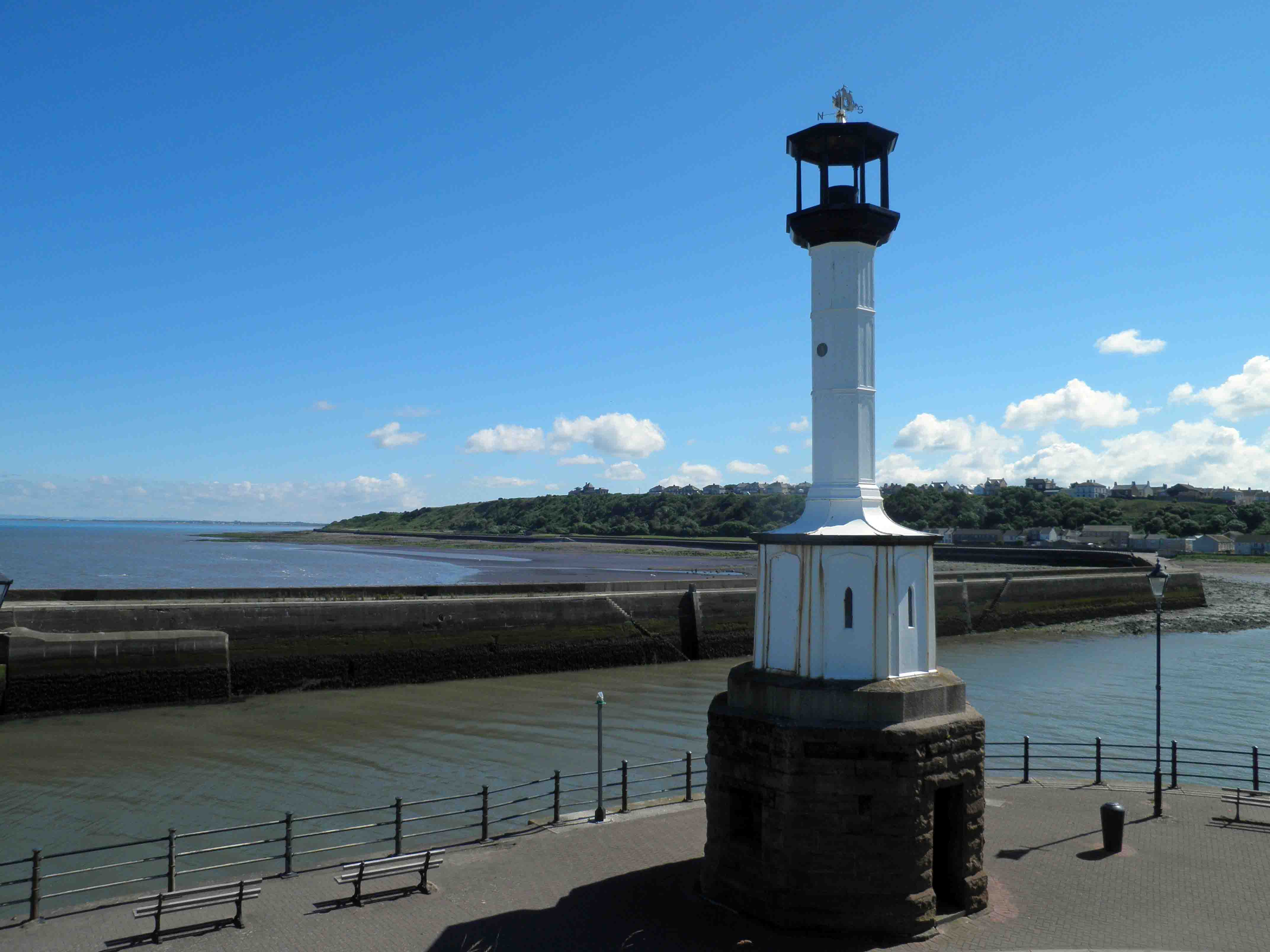
Old Maryport Lighthouse, built 1846

The town has a small lighthouse, formerly run by Trinity House, the general lighthouse authority for England. It is a Grade II listed building.

A new lighthouse was built at the end of the pier in 1996. In 2010 Trinity House transferred responsibility for the new light to the Maryport Harbour Authority. The old lighthouse was restored and repainted in 2017 as part of a government-funded initiative for the refurbishment of seaside towns.

== Governance ==
There are two tiers of local government covering Maryport, at parish (town) and unitary authority level: Maryport Town Council and Cumberland Council. The town council is based at the Town Hall at the corner of Senhouse Street and High Street, a Georgian building which was originally a bank. Cumberland Council also has an office in the Town Hall.

For national elections, Maryport forms part of the Penrith and Solway constituency, which has been represented by Markus Campbell-Savours of the Labour Party since the 2024 general election.

=== Administrative history ===
Maryport historically formed part of the manor of Ellenborough, which straddled the parishes of Crosscanonby and Dearham in the historic county of Cumberland. The part of Ellenborough manor in Crosscanonby parish (north of the River Ellen) was known as the township of Netherhall, and the part of Ellenborough manor in Dearham parish (south of the Ellen) formed a joint township with the neighbouring manor of Ewanrigg. The township of Ellenborough and Ewanrigg became a separate civil parish from Dearham in 1866.

In 1833, a body of improvement commissioners was established to administer Maryport. The commissioners' area as created in 1833 was described as the "township of Maryport", but it was subsequently held that this wording was incorrect as there was no township called Maryport. It was therefore unclear whether the commissioners' powers extended over just the township of Netherhall, which contained the main part of the town, or the whole manor of Ellenborough. The ambiguity was resolved in 1866 when the Maryport commissioners' district was redefined by reference to a new boundary, which covered most of the township of Netherhall and a small part of the township of Ellenborough and Ewanrigg on the south bank of the Ellen. In 1894, the district was extended to cover the whole of the townships of Netherhall (which was made a separate civil parish from Crosscanonby at the same time) and Ellenborough and Ewanrigg. The extension coincided with such improvement commissioners' districts being reconstituted as urban districts under the Local Government Act 1894.

From 1894 until 1929 the urban district of Maryport comprised two civil parishes: Netherhall, and Ellenborough and Ewanrigg. As urban parishes they did not have parish councils of their own, but were governed directly by Maryport Urban District Council. The two parishes were merged into a single civil parish of Maryport matching the urban district in 1929. The urban district was enlarged in 1934 to take in the neighbouring parish of Flimby to the south, and from 1934 until 1974 the urban district comprised the two urban parishes of Maryport and Flimby.

Maryport Urban District was abolished in 1974. The area became part of the borough of Allerdale in the new county of Cumbria. A successor parish of Maryport was created covering the former urban district, with its parish council taking the name Maryport Town Council. Allerdale was abolished in 2023 when the new Cumberland Council was created, also taking over the functions of the abolished Cumbria County Council in the area.

== Economy ==
The economy of the area and the emergence of the industrial capacity of the town itself developed largely because of mining and sea trade, but these industries have since declined and the town now relies on tourism as the basis of its economy. There is an aquarium, Maryport Maritime Museum (housed in a former pub on the harbour, and established as a museum in 1975) and a Roman museum. The last houses numerous Roman artefacts, most notably a series of altars to Jupiter Optimus Maximus, which were excavated in the vicinity of the Roman fort. In July 2008, a new tourism venue, the Wave Centre, opened its doors. The Wave Centre is a theatre and conference facility, an interactive heritage exhibition on the local history of Maryport, the Tourist Information Centre for Maryport and a gift shop and bistro.

The town has two industrial estates, the Glasson Industrial Estate and the Solway Industrial Estate, which are home to many small local businesses. It was formerly home to a factory belonging to the Bata company which closed in the early 1980s.

== Demography ==
The population in 1841 was 5,311. At the 2021 census, the population of the parish was 10,865, and the population of the built up area was 8,525. The population of the parish in 2011 had been 11,262.

== Culture ==
The town is a major name on the blues music scene, holding the "Maryport Blues Festival" every summer. This has previously attracted names such as Jools Holland, Dionne Warwick, Elkie Brooks, Buddy Guy, Jethro Tull, Van Morrison, Robert Cray and Chuck Berry. The three-day event usually takes place on the last weekend of July, attracting both local and international artists. The 2018 Maryport Blues Festival was cancelled.

Maryport also holds the annual Taste of The Sea food festival where visitors can enjoy food from all over Cumbria, such as Rum Butter and Kendal Mint Cake.

The town has a Scout Group (2nd Maryport) that has been in the town for over 70 years and incorporates most sections within the Scouting Movement. The group was visited by the Bishop of Carlisle to mark the centenary of Scouting in 2008.

The town also has a Girl Guiding Group, a Young Archaeology Society, and a local wildlife conservation society.

Maryport Golf Club, a 18-hole course, was formed on 21 January 1905.

== Media ==
Local news and television programmes are provided by BBC North East and Cumbria and ITV Border. Television signals are received from the Caldbeck TV transmitter.

Local radio stations are BBC Radio Cumbria and Greatest Hits Radio Cumbria & South West Scotland.

The town is served by the local newspaper, Times & Star.

== Education ==
Maryport has five local primary schools, and one secondary school, Netherhall School.

== Transport ==
=== Train ===
The town has 1 railway station on the Cumbrian Coast Line. The station has services to either Carlisle or Whitehaven. As of March 2026, there is an hourly train in each direction. The railway line is run by the Class 156.

=== Bus ===
Bus services from the town run to Workington, Whitehaven, Carlisle and Wigton.

== Sport ==
The opening stage of the Tour of Britain Women's cycle race passed through Maryport in 2026.

== Notable people ==
- Dan Bewley, speedway rider
- Taylor Charters, footballer
- Fletcher Christian, mutineer on HMS Bounty
- Douglas Clark, rugby league player
- Jack Connor, footballer
- Kyle Dempsey, footballer
- Bunty Gunn, (born 1933, television presenter).
- William Harrison Merchant Navy Officer, and first Captain of Brunel's SS Great Eastern
- Mark Heron, musician
- Dick Huddart, rugby league player
- Thomas Henry Ismay, founder of the White Star Line shipping company
- Ricky Lightfoot, world champion trail runner
- James Lomas, rugby league player
- Seán Milroy, Irish revolutionary and politician
- Brandon Moore, rugby league player
- Glenn Murray, footballer
- Tee Ritson, rugby league player
- Edward Benn Smith, recipient of the Victoria Cross
- Tom Smith, footballer
- Ike Southward, rugby league player
- George Tosh, engineer and metallurgist

== See also ==
- Listed buildings in Maryport
