= Railways Clauses Consolidation (Scotland) Act 1845 =

Act of the Parliament of the United Kingdom

Railways Clauses Consolidation (Scotland) Act 1845 (Note: Section 4.)
- Act of Parliament
- Parliament of the United Kingdom
- Long title: An Act for consolidating in One Act certain Provisions usually inserted in Acts authorizing the making of Railways in Scotland.
- Citation: 8 & 9 Vict. c. 33
- Territorial extent: Scotland (Note: Section 1.)

Dates
- Royal assent: 8 May 1845
- Commencement: 8 May 1845 (Note: Section 1.)
Other legislation
Amended by	Statute Law Revision Act 1875; Statute Law Revision Act 1891; Statute Law Revision Act 1892; Road and Rail Traffic Act 1933; Roads (Scotland) Act 1984; Railways Act 1921; Mines (Working Facilities and Support) Act 1923; National Assistance (Adaptation of Enactments) Regulations 1952; Transport Charges &c. (Miscellaneous Provisions) Act 1954; Clean Air Act 1956; Statute Law Revision Act 1959; Transport Act 1962; Transfer of Functions (Shipping and Construction of Ships) Order 1965; Land Compensation (Scotland) Act 1973; Criminal Procedure (Scotland) Act 1975; Criminal Justice (Scotland) Act 1980; Statute Law (Repeals) Act 1981; Statute Law (Repeals) Act 1986; Transport and Works Act 1992; Statute Law (Repeals) Act 1993; Railways Act 1993 (Consequential Modifications) Order 1994; Debt Arrangement and Attachment (Scotland) Act 2002
Relates to	Companies Clauses Consolidation Act 1845; Companies Clauses Consolidation (Scotland) Act 1845; Lands Clauses Consolidation Act 1845; Lands Clauses Consolidation (Scotland) Act 1845; Railways Clauses Consolidation Act 1845; Markets and Fairs Clauses Act 1847; Gasworks Clauses Act 1847; Commissioners Clauses Act 1847; Waterworks Clauses Act 1847; Railways Clauses Act 1863; Waterworks Clauses Act 1863; Companies Clauses Act 1863

Status: Amended

Text of statute as originally enacted

Text of the Railways Clauses Consolidation (Scotland) Act 1845 as in force today (including any amendments) within the United Kingdom, from legislation.gov.uk.

The Railways Clauses Consolidation (Scotland) Act 1845 (8 & 9 Vict. c. 33) is an act of the Parliament of the United Kingdom that standardised provisions and definitions relating to railway companies in Scotland.

The act may be referred to or incorporated by anyone constructing a railway, including proposing to extend heritage railways.

The Railways Clauses Consolidation Act 1845 (8 & 9 Vict. c. 20) made similar provisions for England and Wales and Ireland.

As of 2026, the act remains in force in the United Kingdom.

== Subsequent developments ==
The following provisions were repealed by section 2 of, and the second schedule to, the Statute Law Revision Act 1959 (7 & 8 Eliz. 2. c. 68), which came into force on 29 July 1959.

- In section 79, the words from " and to make such reasonable charges " onwards.
- Sections 84-86.
- In section 88, the words from the beginning to " maintained and " and the words " board or ".
- In section 89, the words " by notice to be annexed to the list of tolls ".

Section 131 of the act was repealed by section 1(1) of, and group 5 of part I of schedule 1 to, the Statute Law (Repeals) Act 1986, which came into force on 2 May 1986.
