= Towns Improvement Clauses Act 1847 =

Act of the Parliament of the United Kingdom

Towns Improvement Clauses Act 1847 (Note: Section 4.)
- Act of Parliament
- Parliament of the United Kingdom
- Long title: An Act for consolidating in One Act certain Provisions usually contained in Acts for paving, draining, cleansing, lighting, and improving Towns.
- Citation: 10 & 11 Vict. c. 34
- Territorial extent: United Kingdom

Dates
- Royal assent: 21 June 1847
- Commencement: 21 June 1847 (Note: The Acts of Parliament (Commencement) Act 1793.)

Other legislation
- Amended by: Statute Law Revision Act 1891; Perjury Act 1911; Rating and Valuation Act 1925; Local Government Act 1933; Justices of the Peace Act 1949; Clean Air Act 1956; Highways Act 1959; Courts Act 1971; Statute Law (Repeals) Act 1975; Statute Law (Repeals) Act 1981; Statute Law (Repeals) Act 1993
- Relates to: Markets and Fairs Clauses Act 1847; Gasworks Clauses Act 1847; Commissioners Clauses Act 1847; Waterworks Clauses Act 1847; Harbours, Docks, and Piers Clauses Act 1847; Cemeteries Clauses Act 1847; Town Police Clauses Act 1847

Status: Amended

Text of statute as originally enacted

Revised text of statute as amended

Text of the Towns Improvement Clauses Act 1847 as in force today (including any amendments) within the United Kingdom, from legislation.gov.uk.

The Towns Improvement Clauses Act 1847 (10 & 11 Vict. c. 34) is an act of the Parliament of the United Kingdom that standardised provisions and definitions relating to the development and improvement of urban infrastructure in towns in the United Kingdom..

The act is the first act of Parliament to have been given a short title.

As of 2026, the act remains in force in the United Kingdom.

== Subsequent developments ==
Sections 200–208 of the act, including those sections as incorporated in any other act, were repealed by section 1(1) of, and part VIII of the schedule to, the Statute Law (Repeals) Act 1975, which came into force on 13 March 1975.
