= Cemeteries Clauses Act 1847 =

Act of the Parliament of the United Kingdom

Cemeteries Clauses Act 1847 (Note: Section 4.)
- Act of Parliament
- Parliament of the United Kingdom
- Long title: An Act for consolidating in One Act certain Provisions usually contained in Acts authorizing the making of Cemeteries.
- Citation: 10 & 11 Vict. c. 65
- Territorial extent: United Kingdom

Dates
- Royal assent: 9 July 1847
- Commencement: 9 July 1847 (Note: The Acts of Parliament (Commencement) Act 1793.)
Other legislation
Amended by	Statute Law Revision Act 1875; Statute Law Revision Act 1894; Perjury Act 1911; Justices of the Peace Act 1949; Criminal Damage Act 1971; Local Government Act 1972; Statute Law Revision (Northern Ireland) Act 1980; Statute Law (Repeals) Act 1981; Statute Law (Repeals) Act 1993; Law Reform (Miscellaneous Provisions) (Northern Ireland) Order 2005
Relates to	Markets and Fairs Clauses Act 1847; Gasworks Clauses Act 1847; Commissioners Clauses Act 1847; Waterworks Clauses Act 1847; Harbours, Docks, and Piers Clauses Act 1847; Towns Improvement Clauses Act 1847; Town Police Clauses Act 1847

Status: Amended

Text of statute as originally enacted

Revised text of statute as amended

Text of the Cemeteries Clauses Act 1847 as in force today (including any amendments) within the United Kingdom, from legislation.gov.uk.

The Cemeteries Clauses Act 1847 (10 & 11 Vict. c. 65) is an act of the Parliament of the United Kingdom that consolidated the law concerning the management and regulation of public cemeteries in the United Kingdom.

As of 2025, the act remains in force in the United Kingdom.

== Section 10 – Cemetery not to be within a certain distance of houses ==
Section 10 of the act was repealed by section 272(1) of, and Schedule 30 to, the Local Government Act 1972.

== Section 58 – Penalty for damaging the cemetery ==
Section 58 of the act was repealed by section 11(8) of, and Part II of the schedule to, the Criminal Damage Act 1971.

== Section 59 – Penalty on persons committing nuisances in the cemetery ==
Proposal for repeal

In 1985, the Law Commission said that this offence was no longer used and recommended that it be repealed.

== Section 65 – Persons giving false evidence liable to penalties of perjury ==
This section was repealed, so far as it applied to England, by section 17 of, and the Schedule to the Perjury Act 1911.

== Subsequent developments ==
Section 63 and 69 of the act was repealed by section 1 of, and the schedule to, the Statute Law Revision Act 1875 (38 & 39 Vict. c. 66), which came into force on 11 August 1875.

Section 61 of the act was repealed by section 1 of, and the first schedule to, the Statute Law Revision Act 1891 (54 & 55 Vict. c. 67), which came into force on 5 August 1891.

Section 31 of the act and section 55 of the act from “and if any” onwards were repealed by section 1(1) of, and part VI of schedule 1 to, the Statute Law (Repeals) Act 1993, which came into force on 5 November 1993.

== See also ==
- Halsbury's Statutes
