= Lands Clauses Consolidation (Scotland) Act 1845 =

Act of the Parliament of the United Kingdom

Lands Clauses Consolidation (Scotland) Act 1845 (Note: Section 4.)
- Act of Parliament
- Parliament of the United Kingdom
- Long title: An Act for consolidating in one Act certain provisions usually inserted in Acts authorizing the taking of lands for undertakings of a public nature in Scotland.
- Citation: 8 & 9 Vict. c. 19
- Territorial extent: Scotland (Note: Section 1.)

Dates
- Royal assent: 8 May 1845
- Commencement: 8 May 1845 (Note: Section 1.)
Other legislation
Amended by	Lands Clauses Consolidation Acts Amendment Act 1860; Lands Clauses Consolidation Act 1869; Statute Law Revision Act 1875; Lands Clauses (Umpire) Act 1883; Lands Clauses (Taxation of Costs) Act 1895; National Assistance Act 1948; Statute Law (Repeals) Act 1981; Age of Legal Capacity (Scotland) Act 1991; Statute Law (Repeals) Act 1986; Statute Law (Repeals) Act 1993; Abolition of Feudal Tenure etc. (Scotland) Act 2000
Relates to	Companies Clauses Consolidation Act 1845; Companies Clauses Consolidation (Scotland) Act 1845; Lands Clauses Consolidation Act 1845; Railways Clauses Consolidation Act 1845; Railways Clauses Consolidation (Scotland) Act 1845; Markets and Fairs Clauses Act 1847; Gasworks Clauses Act 1847; Commissioners Clauses Act 1847; Waterworks Clauses Act 1847; Railways Clauses Act 1863; Waterworks Clauses Act 1863; Companies Clauses Act 1863

Status: Amended

Text of statute as originally enacted

Revised text of statute as amended

Text of the Lands Clauses Consolidation (Scotland) Act 1845 as in force today (including any amendments) within the United Kingdom, from legislation.gov.uk.

The Lands Clauses Consolidation (Scotland) Act 1845 (8 & 9 Vict. c. 19) is an act of the Parliament of the United Kingdom that standardised provisions and definitions relating to the purchase of land by the government in Scotland.

The act was passed to standardise how the government acquires private land for public projects and to ensure fair compensation for property owners.

The Lands Clauses Consolidation Act 1845 (8 & 9 Vict. c. 18) made similar provisions for England and Wales and Ireland.

As of 2025, the act remains in force in the United Kingdom.

== Subsequent developments ==
The act was amended by the Lands Clauses Consolidation Acts Amendment Act 1860 (23 & 24 Vict. c. 106), which allowed the Secretary of State for Defence to compulsory purchase land sought under the Defence Act 1842 (5 & 6 Vict. c. 94).

The act was further amended by the Lands Clauses Consolidation Act 1869 (32 & 33 Vict. c. 18), the Lands Clauses (Umpire) Act 1883 (46 & 47 Vict. c. 15) and the Lands Clauses (Taxation of Costs) Act 1895 (58 & 59 Vict. c. 11).

Section 132 of the act was repealed by section 1(1) of, and group 1 of part I of schedule 1 to, the Statute Law (Repeals) Act 1986, which came into force on 2 May 1986. Section 129 of the act was repealed by section 1(1) of, and group 5 of part I of schedule 1 to, the 1986 act.

== Criticism ==
The Committee on Acquisition of Land Committee (1917–1919) chaired by Lord Justice Scott gave the following opinion on the act:

We are of opinion that the Lands Clauses Acts are out of date, and fail to give effect to the requirements of the community of today, and therefore that they should be repealed and replaced by a fresh code.

The act has received subsequent criticism by the Scottish Law Commission in their Discussion Papers in Compulsory Purchase (2014, SLC DP No: 159). In this discussion paper, the SLC has advocated the repeal of the 1845 act and replacement with modern legislation.
