= Town Police Clauses Act 1847 =

Act of the Parliament of the United Kingdom

Town Police Clauses Act 1847 (Note: Section 4.)
- Act of Parliament
- Parliament of the United Kingdom
- Long title: An Act for consolidating in One Act certain Provisions usually contained in Acts for regulating the Police of Towns.
- Citation: 10 & 11 Vict. c. 89
- Territorial extent: England and Wales; Ireland; (Note: Section 1.)

Dates
- Royal assent: 22 July 1847
- Commencement: 22 July 1847 (Note: The Acts of Parliament (Commencement) Act 1793.)
Other legislation
Amended by	Statute Law Revision Act 1875; Town Police Clauses Act 1889; Statute Law Revision Act 1891; Police Act 1893; Statute Law Revision Act 1894; Perjury Act 1911; Road Traffic Act 1930; Fire Brigades Act 1938; Perjury (Northern Ireland) Act 1946; Magistrates’ Courts Act 1952; Licensing Act 1953; Penalties for Drunkenness Act 1962; Police Act 1964; Criminal Justice Act 1967; Courts Act 1971; Statute Law (Repeals) Act 1973; Statute Law (Repeals) Act 1975; Local Government (Miscellaneous Provisions) Act 1976; Criminal Law Act 1977; Statute Law Revision (Northern Ireland) Act 1980; Local Government, Planning and Land Act 1980; Statute Law (Repeals) Act 1981; Indecent Displays (Control) Act 1981; Transport Act 1981; Criminal Justice Act 1982; Police and Criminal Evidence Act 1984; Transport Act 1985; Protection of Animals (Amendment) Act 1988; Statute Law (Repeals) Act 1989; Statute Law (Repeals) Act 1993; Police Act 1996; Greater London Authority Act 1999; Sexual Offences Act 2003; Animal Welfare Act 2006; Equality Act 2010; Deregulation Act 2015; Justice Act (N.I.) 2015
Relates to	Markets and Fairs Clauses Act 1847; Gasworks Clauses Act 1847; Commissioners Clauses Act 1847; Waterworks Clauses Act 1847; Harbours, Docks, and Piers Clauses Act 1847; Towns Improvement Clauses Act 1847; Cemeteries Clauses Act 1847

Status: Partially repealed

Text of statute as originally enacted

Revised text of statute as amended

Text of the Town Police Clauses Act 1847 as in force today (including any amendments) within the United Kingdom, from legislation.gov.uk.

The Town Police Clauses Act 1847 (10 & 11 Vict. c. 89) is an act of the Parliament of the United Kingdom. The statute remains in force in both the United Kingdom (except Scotland) and the Republic of Ireland, and is frequently used by local councils to close roads to allow public events such as processions or street parties to take place.

The act is also used to regulate the local hackney carriage, taxi and private-hire trade in many areas. It deals with a range of street obstructions and nuisances, for example, it makes it illegal to perform certain actions in a public street or other thoroughfare, such as hanging washing, beating carpets, and flying kites, although many of those clauses were repealed for England and Wales in 2015.

Historically, it was highly significant legislating against indecent exposure, indecent acts, obscene publications, and prostitution.

== Background ==
In 1847, the House of Commons Select Committee on Private Bills presented a report. In 1842 to 1843, the average number of private bills passed was 161, rising to an average of 347 from 1845 to 1846. By 21 July 1847, the House of Commons, 490 petitions for private bills were received that year. Already in place, resulting from early reports by the select committee, new mechanisms were in place to deal more efficiently with private bills.

Noting was that much of the business the House of Commons was dealing with were numerous private bills, which due to the clauses they contained, were essentially public bills. Drawing up private bills to deal with public functions had consequences. The select committee wrote:

... some varying or interfering with the general statute or common law of the country; some, though ordinary in their nature, yet of a perplexing and needless diversity in form; and, finally, some so contradictory and mutually discordant as to render their enforcement impossible, and to make the law doubtful and embarrassing even to those who are professionally versed in it

To provide uniformity in legislation in different geographical areas, to reduce the number of private bills about public functions, and to reduce expense, the select committee proposed eight public acts, each dealing with a different topic:

- Markets and fairs
- Gasworks
- Public commissioners
- Waterworks
- Harbour, docks and piers
- Town improvements
- Cemeteries
- Police

The police legislation was enacted as the Town Police Clauses Act 1847.

== Original purposes of the act ==
The original act covered six areas,

- Police regulations and administration
- Obstructions and nuisances, including several significant offences about indecent exposure, indecent acts, and obscene publications
- Fires and administration of fire fighting
- Regulating places of public resort, for example, coffee shops and refreshment house used as meeting places for thieves and prostitutes, places for bear baiting and cock fighting
- Public bathing
- Hackney carriages

== Subsequent developments ==
Section 22 of the act, including that section as incorporated in any other act, was repealed by section 1(1) of, and part VI of schedule 1 to, the Statute Law (Repeals) Act 1973, which came into force on 18 July 1973.

Sections 69 and 73 of the act, as they apply to England and Wales, including those sections as incorporated in any other act, and sections 70 and 71 of the act, including those sections as incorporated in any other act, were repealed by section 1(1) of, and part VIII of the schedule to, the Statute Law (Repeals) Act 1975, which came into force on 13 March 1975.

Sections 77 and 78 of the act were repealed for England and Wales by section 1(1) of, and part X of schedule 1 to, the Statute Law (Repeals) Act 1989, which came into force on 16 November 1989.

== Provisions still in force ==
Many clauses of the act are still in force; these are provisions dealing with

- Preventing obstructions during street processions
- Prohibiting stage carriages from diverting from a prescribed route
- Powers enabling the building of pounds for stray animals
- Impounding stray cattle, selling them, and unlawfully releasing them from a pound
- A significant number of nuisances and obstructions to the highway
- Violent and indecent behaviour in a police station
- Accidentally allowing chimney fires
- Keeping places for animal fighting, baiting, or worrying them, for example bear baiting and cock fighting
- Hackney carriages

The act is still relevant to policing the highway. Many offences in the act relating to nuisance and obstruction in the street, and the act is also a means of regulating road closures for special events.

The law controls the use of fireworks, and the wanton discharge of firearms in the street. A significant role is the licensing of hackney carriages. It also prohibits the wanton furious driving of a horse and carriage in the street. A role of the act is to regulate peoples' behaviour. It remains an offence to be disorderly or insulting in a police station.

Until 2003, the act was one piece of legislation against prostitution in a range of premises, including hotels. Although superseded by other laws a conviction for indecency, deriving from the act, is on a list of offences which can be used to identify those who present a risk, or potential risk, to children.

== See also ==
- Local board of health
