= Railways Clauses Consolidation Act 1845 =

Act of the Parliament of the United Kingdom

Railways Clauses Consolidation Act 1845 (Note: Section 4)
- Act of Parliament
- Parliament of the United Kingdom
- Long title: An Act for consolidating in One Act certain Provisions usually inserted in Acts authorizing the making of Railways.
- Citation: 8 & 9 Vict. c. 20
- Territorial extent: England and Wales; Ireland; (Note: Section 164)

Dates
- Royal assent: 8 May 1845
- Commencement: 8 May 1845 (Note: Section 1)
Other legislation
Amended by	Statute Law Revision Act 1875; Statute Law Revision Act 1891; Statute Law Revision Act 1892; Perjury Act 1911; Railways Act 1921; Mines (Working Facilities and Support) Act 1923; Supreme Court of Judicature (Consolidation) Act 1925; Road and Rail Traffic Act 1933; Justices of the Peace Act 1949; Transport Charges &c. (Miscellaneous Provisions) Act 1954; Clean Air Act 1956; Statute Law Revision Act 1959; Statute Law Revision Act 1960; Transport Act 1962; Compulsory Purchase Act 1965; Transfer of Functions (Shipping and Construction of Ships) Order 1965; Courts Act 1971; Criminal Damage Act 1971; Local Government Act 1972; Statute Law (Repeals) Act 1976; Criminal Law Act 1977; Statute Law Revision (Northern Ireland) Act 1980; Statute Law (Repeals) Act 1981; Criminal Justice Act 1982; Road Traffic, Transport and Roads (Northern Ireland) Order 1984; Statute Law (Repeals) Act 1986; Transport and Works Act 1992; Statute Law (Repeals) Act 1993; Railways Act 1993 (Consequential Modifications) Order 1994; Courts Act 2003; Serious Organised Crime and Police Act 2005; Police and Criminal Evidence (Amendment) (Northern Ireland) Order 2007; Transfer of Tribunal Functions (Lands Tribunal and Miscellaneous Amendments) Order 2009; Justice Act (Northern Ireland) 2015
Relates to	Companies Clauses Consolidation Act 1845; Companies Clauses Consolidation (Scotland) Act 1845; Lands Clauses Consolidation Act 1845; Lands Clauses Consolidation (Scotland) Act 1845; Railways Clauses Consolidation (Scotland) Act 1845; Markets and Fairs Clauses Act 1847; Gasworks Clauses Act 1847; Commissioners Clauses Act 1847; Waterworks Clauses Act 1847; Railways Clauses Act 1863; Waterworks Clauses Act 1863; Companies Clauses Act 1863

Status: Amended

Text of statute as originally enacted

Revised text of statute as amended

Text of the Railways Clauses Consolidation Act 1845 as in force today (including any amendments) within the United Kingdom, from legislation.gov.uk.

The Railways Clauses Consolidation Act 1845 (8 & 9 Vict. c. 20) is an act of the Parliament of the United Kingdom that standardised provisions and definitions relating to railway companies in England and Wales and Ireland.

The act may be referred to or incorporated by anyone constructing a railway, including proposing to extend heritage railways.

The Railways Clauses Consolidation (Scotland) Act 1845 (8 & 9 Vict. c. 33) made similar provisions for Scotland.

As of 2026, the act remains in force in the United Kingdom.

== Subsequent developments ==
The following provisions were repealed by section 2 of, and the second schedule to, the Statute Law Revision Act 1959 (7 & 8 Eliz. 2. c. 68), which came into force on 29 July 1959.

- In section 86, the words from " and to make such reasonable charges " onwards.
- Sections 91-93.
- In section 95, the words from the beginning to " maintained and " and the words " board or ".
- In section 96, the words " by notice to be annexed to the list of tolls ".

Sections 25–29, 63 and 64 of the act were repealed by section 1(1) of, and the schedule to, the Statute Law Revision Act 1960 (8 & 9 Eliz. 2. c. 56), which came into force on 29 July 1960.

Section 156 of the act, including that section as incorporated in any other act, was repealed by section 1(1) of, and part XIX of schedule 1 to, the Statute Law (Repeals) Act 1976, which came into force on 27 May 1976.

Section 139 of the act was repealed by section 1(1) of, and group 5 of part I of schedule 1 to, the Statute Law (Repeals) Act 1986, which came into force on 2 May 1986.
