= Compulsory purchase laws in Scotland =

Compulsory purchase are powers to obtain land in Scotland that were traditionally available to certain public bodies in Scots law. Scots law classifies compulsory purchase as an involuntary transfer of land, as the owner of the corporeal heritable property (land) does not consent to the transfer of ownership.

Compulsory purchase powers are similar, but not identical, to other jurisdictions who share similar concepts and similar terms. In contrast to other jurisdictions, compulsory purchase powers can be exercised by non-public bodies under the Land Reform (Scotland) Act 2003.

== History ==
The development of powers of compulsory purchase in Scotland originated in the railway mania of the Victorian period within the United Kingdom of Great Britain and Ireland (1801-1921). Historically, where the United Kingdom government wished to acquire land without the consent of an owner in Scotland, a private bill had to be introduced into the United Kingdom parliament. This bill had to outline the area of land (commonly the extent of the railway track itself) expressly sought and provided a power of compulsory purchase to the constructing entity. An example of this private bill is the construction of the Edinburgh-Glasgow railway line under the Edinburgh and Glasgow Railway Act 1838 (1 & 2 Vict. c. lviii). This method of compulsory purchase was viewed as a repetitive and time-consuming process and the United Kingdom parliament enacted the Lands Clauses Consolidation (Scotland) Act 1845 (8 & 9 Vict. c. 19), which introduced a standard form process of compulsory purchase into Scots law.

Subsequent legislation has been introduced to amend and supplement the 1845 act, leading to criticism that the current legislative framework for compulsory purchase powers are complex and confusing.

== Current Legislation ==
=== Lands Clauses Consolidation (Scotland) Act 1845 ===
The Lands Clauses Consolidation (Scotland) Act 1845 (8 & 9 Vict. c. 19) operates by the Parliament of the United Kingdom passing a special act authorising the construction project. The special act would signal Parliament's approval to a specific project requiring compulsory purchase. The detailed procedural provisions for the compulsory purchase itself are carried out by incorporating the 1845 act into a subsequent local act. Therefore, the 1845 act provides a common framework upon which compulsory purchase procedures are obtained.

Despite criticism by the Committee on Acquisition of Land (1917–1919) chaired by Lord Justice Scott and the Scottish Law Commission in 2014, which advocated for the repeal and replacement of the act with modern regislation, the 1845 act has not been repealed and replaced by the Scottish Parliament.

=== Railways Clauses Consolidation Act 1845 ===
The Railways Clauses Consolidation Act 1845 (8 & 9 Vict. c. 20) and the Railways Clauses Consolidation (Scotland) Act 1845 (8 & 9 Vict. c. 33) were enacted two months after the Lands Clauses Consolidation (Scotland) Act 1845. The acts regulate the compulsory purchase of land in relation to railway construction. The acts also introduced special provisions for mineral (mining) rights known informally as the Mining Code.

=== Lands Clauses Consolidation Acts Amendment Act 1860 ===
Lands Clauses Consolidation Acts Amendment Act 1860 (Note: Section 8.)
- Act of Parliament
- Parliament of the United Kingdom
- Long title: An Act to amend the Lands Clauses Consolidation Acts, 1845, in regard to sales and compensation for land by way of a rentcharge, annual feu duty or ground annual, and to enable Her Majesty’s Principal Secretary of State for the War Department to avail himself of the powers and provisions contained in the same Acts.
- Citation: 23 & 24 Vict. c. 106
- Territorial extent: United Kingdom

Dates
- Royal assent: 20 August 1860
- Commencement: 20 August 1860 (Note: The Acts of Parliament (Commencement) Act 1793.)
Other legislation
Amends	Lands Clauses Consolidation Act 1845
Amended by	Statute Law Revision Act 1875; Municipal Corporations Act 1882; Statute Law Revision Act 1892; Abolition of Feudal Tenure etc. (Scotland) Act 2000

Status: Amended

Text of statute as originally enacted

Revised text of statute as amended

Text of the Land Clauses Consolidation Acts Amendment Act 1860 as in force today (including any amendments) within the United Kingdom, from legislation.gov.uk.

The Lands Clauses Consolidation Acts Amendment Act 1860 (23 & 24 Vict. c. 106) allows the Secretary of State for Defence to use the Lands Clauses Consolidation (Scotland) Act 1845 to compulsory purchase land sought under the Defence Act 1842. The act also amended the Lands Clauses Consolidation (Scotland) Act 1845.

=== Acquisition of Land (Authorisation Procedure) (Scotland) Act 1947 ===
Acquisition of Land (Authorisation Procedure) (Scotland) Act 1947 (Note: Section 9(1).)
- Act of Parliament
- Parliament of the United Kingdom
- Long title: An Act to re-enact in the form in which they apply to Scotland the provisions of the Acquisition of Land (Authorisation Procedure) Act, 1946.
- Citation: 10 & 11 Geo. 6. c. 42
- Territorial extent: Scotland (Note: Section 9(2).)

Dates
- Royal assent: 31 July 1947
- Commencement: 31 July 1947 (Note: The Acts of Parliament (Commencement) Act 1793.)
Other legislation
Amended by	Town and Country Planning (Scotland) Act 1947; Statute Law Revision Act 1953; Statute Law (Repeals) Act 1973; Ancient Monuments and Archaeological Areas Act 1979; Coal Industry Act 1994; Postal Services Act 2011

Status: Amended

Text of statute as originally enacted

Revised text of statute as amended

Text of the Acquisition of Land (Authorisation Procedure) (Scotland) Act 1947 as in force today (including any amendments) within the United Kingdom, from legislation.gov.uk.

The Acquisition of Land (Authorisation Procedure) (Scotland) Act 1947 (10 & 11 Geo. 6. c. 42) is the main statute currently dealing with the procedural provisions of the compulsory purchase order process.

The 1947 act lays out the processes that must be followed for compulsory purchases authorised by other statutes, including the 1845 act. A range of other statutes empower public bodies such as the Scottish Government, the United Kingdom government and its agencies, and local authorities in Scotland.

=== Lands Tribunal Act 1949 ===
The Lands Tribunal Act 1949 (12, 13 & 14 Geo. 6. c. 42) establishes the Lands Tribunal for Scotland (LTS). The Land Tribunal deals with a wide range of land related disputes, including disputes regarding compensation payable to landowners subject to compulsory purchases.

=== Land Compensation (Scotland) Act 1963 ===
The Land Compensation (Scotland) Act 1963 (c. 51) is the current statutory framework for compensation of land. These provisions replace those found in the Acquisition of Land (Assessment of Compensation) Act 1919. Section 12 of the 1963 act sets out the rules in which compensation must be assessed. There are special provisions for certain types of land. Further provisions for compensation are found in the Land Compensation (Scotland) Act 1973.

=== Town and Country Planning (Scotland) Act 1997 ===
The Town and Country Planning (Scotland) Act 1997 (c. 8) is one of the main statutes dealing with planning law in Scotland. Under part VIII, the 1997 act allows land to be compulsory or voluntarily purchased for planning purposes. The procedure for any compulsory purchase acquisition is dealt with by the Acquisition of Land (Authorisation Procedure) (Scotland) Act 1947. The 1997 act also regulates General Vesting Declarations, discussed below.

== Compulsory purchase process by public body ==
As discussed above, the main acts regulating the procedure for compulsory purchase are the Acquisition of Land (Authorisation Procedure) (Scotland) Act 1947. Alternatively, the processes of the Lands Clauses Consolidation (Scotland) Act 1845 may be used instead.

=== Exceptions to normal procedure ===
Certain exceptions to the normal procedures are provided for certain land by the following acts:

- Local acts may provide for certain local authorities to be able to compulsory purchase land with processes specified by that local act.
- The Opencast Coal Act 1958 provides specific procedures for compulsory purchase of opencast coal mines.
- The Burial Grounds (Scotland) Act 1855 provides specific procedures for compulsory purchase of burial grounds in Scotland.
- The Allotments (Scotland) Acts 1892 and the Land Settlement (Scotland) Act 1919 provides procedures for the compulsory purchase of land for use as allotments gardening. The 1892 act provides a duty on local authorities to acquire land for allotments upon written demand of at least six residents.
- The Forestry Act 1967 (c. 10) provides specific procedures for the Forestry and Land Scotland's powers to compulsory purchase land for use for forestry.
- Numerous other legislation also regulates compulsory purchase in a wide range of other types of land use and by a wide range of public bodies. A comprehensive list is available to view online in Scottish Law Commission, Discussion Paper of Compulsory Purchase (2014, SLC DP No: 159), Appendix B. It is anticipated that any further reform in this area will consolidate the vast complex range of procedures laid out in numerous statutes.

=== Stage one - Identifying and surveying land ===
The acquiring authority should seek to listen to the people affected at every stage of the process. Scottish Government recommends that the acquiring authority should consider appointing a specified case manager to whom people have direct, easy and face to face access.

if no voluntary agreement is reached, the acquiring authority can identify land it wishes to compulsory purchase under powers given to it by statute, see above. Ultimate permission for the purchase is given by authorisation by the confirming authority, usually the Scottish Ministers (or the UK Government if undertaken by an authority under reserved powers). Thus, acquiring authorities cannot unilaterally utilise their compulsory purchase powers. However, where land has been identified for compulsory purchase, under the Lands Clauses Consolidation (Scotland) Act 1845, the acquiring authority has a power to enter the land for purposes of surveying, probing or boring. However, the acquiring authority must give at least 3 days, but not more than 14 days, notice to the current owner of the land.

=== Stage two - Drafting of compulsory purchase order ===
In order to create a compulsory transfer of ownership to the acquiring authority, the acquiring authority must prepare a prescribed legal document known as a compulsory purchase order often shortened to 'CPO'. The compulsory purchase order must be in a manner prescribed under the Compulsory Purchase of Land (Scotland) Regulations 2003 (SSI 2003/446). The CPO must include a map, or a reference to a map, in order to delineate the land sought. The CPO must then be submitted for confirmation by the Scottish Ministers (for devolved acquiring authorities) or relevant UK Government minister (reserved acquiring authorities).

==== Public advertisement ====
Once the compulsory purchase order has been drafted, the acquiring authority must place a notice in at least one or more local newspapers for a period of two successive weeks to allow residents to have sufficient notice of the compulsory purchase plans. The notice must inform the newspaper reader expressly the following:

- that the draft compulsory purchase order is about to be submitted for confirmation.
- the purpose for which the land is required, and
- A description of the land sought under the CPO, and
- Naming a place within the locality where a copy of the order and the map referred to therein may be inspected, and
- specifying the time (not being less than twenty-one days from the first publication of the notice) within which and the manner in which objections to the order can be made.

==== Notification to owners ====
The acquiring authority must also serve on the following individuals a notice of the draft compulsory purchase order and the closing date for objections to the CPO:

- every owner, lessee and occupier (except tenants for a month or any period less than month) of any land comprised in the CPO.
- Any the holder of any personal real burden affecting that land if registration of the conveyance in implement of the order would vary or extinguish the title condition in question;
- the owner of any land which is a benefited property of a title condition, or encumberance, of land sought under the CPO.
- the owners' association of a development within the land sought under the CPO.

If any of these individuals cannot be identified and contacted, special procedures by way of public advertisement will apply. The Scottish Government recommends acquiring authorities also send a copy of the Guide to compulsory purchase and compensation' for this purpose.

==== Objections ====
A minimum statutory period of 21 days applies for any objections to be made to the draft compulsory purchase order. If any objection is made to the confirming authority, the confirming authority must send the objections to the acquiring authority for their comments. If the objections are not withdrawn, the acquiring authority can negotiate with the objectors. If there is no resolution, the Scottish Government may hold a public local inquiry. This is done by way of referral of the draft CPO to the Planning and Environmental Appeals Divisions (DPEA) of the Scottish Government.

==== Public local inquiry ====
Where an objection is not withdraw, a public local inquiry will be held by the Scottish Government's Planning and Environmental Appeals Division (DPEA). In practice, the DPEA will appoint a Reporter to hold the inquiry rather than chaired by Scottish Ministers. Where an inquiry is held, the DPEA Reporter must inform all objectors and publishes a notice in local newspapers that an inquiry is to be held and the date/location of such inquiry. The DPEA Reporter will listen to the objections made and any response from the acquiring authority. The DPEA Reporter has the power to require attendance of witnesses. Any individual who fails to attend or give evidence to the public local inquiry at the request of the DPEA Reporter is guilty of a criminal offence. After the inquiry concludes, the DPEA Reporter will produce a report, including recommendations for approval, modification or rejection of the draft CPO.

==== Confirmation ====
If no objections are made, or the DPEA recommends approval of the draft compulsory purchase order, the Scottish Government, or other confirming authority, can confirm the draft CPO if satisfied all notices (above) have been validly served. The Scottish Government may impose such modifications on the compulsory purchase order as it thinks fit when approving it. Following the issuance of confirmation, the acquiring authority must re-notify all previously notified individuals and publicly advertise the confirmation.

==== Revocation of confirmation ====
It is not possible for confirmation by the Scottish Government to be revoked. The Scottish Law Commission that without revocation of an abandoned compulsory purchase order, owners of land may struggle to sell their house as the CPO will normally appear through buyer's due diligence.

=== Stage Three: conveyancing ===
After the confirmation of the Compulsory Purchase Order, ownership of the land must still be transferred through a conveyance. There are two forms of conveyance available, (1) by transfer under a schedule conveyance disposition and (2) by transfer under a General Vesting Declaration.

==== (1) Schedule conveyance ====
A schedule conveyance is a voluntary transfer in which the owner signs a special form of deed, a schedule conveyance disposition. The prescribed form for this deed is found in the Lands Clauses Consolidation (Scotland) Act 1845. In order to initiate this process, the acquiring authority must issue a notice to treat with the owner.

==== Notice to treat ====
A notice to treat is a formal notice sent to the owner] of the land, and other parties with similar rights. The notice to treat must contain an adequate description of the land covered by the proposed conveyance. Failure to do so may result in the notice to treat being invalid.

Service of a notice to treat had historically been taken to create a binding contract, obliging the owner to sign the schedule conveyance deed to transfer ownership. However, modern analysis now distinguishes Notice to Treats from contracts:

"The essence of a contract of sale is that all the terms and conditions are set out and are made the subject of a binding agreement, whereas in the case of compulsory purchase, while a notice to treat obliges an acquiring authority to purchase the land from the person to whom notice has been given, many of the details at that stage remain unsettled"

The service of a notice to treat obliges the acquiring authority to go through with the compulsory purchase and obliges the landowners to set out their claims for compensation and an obligation to sign the disposition. A notice to treat ceases to have effect after three years or shorter where (a) a General Vesting Declaration is issued, (b) the acquiring authority has taken possession of the land, or (c) the level of compensation payable is referred to the Land Tribunal for Scotland.

==== Notice of entry ====
Where a notice to treat has been served, the acquiring authority can additionally serve a notice of entry giving the landowner at least 14 days notice that upon expiration of the notice period, the acquiring authority will enter and take possession of the land. However, ownership (title) of the land itself will not vest until compensation has been determined and paid to the current owner.

==== Schedule conveyance disposition ====
The transfer of the land sought under the Notice to Treat is carried out via a schedule conveyance disposition. This deed is authorised by the Lands Clauses Consolidation (Scotland) Act 1845. This must be signed by the current owner and registered in the Land Register of Scotland. Where an owner refuses to sign this deed, a General Vesting Declaration may be used instead. An example disposition can be found on the Registers of Scotland website:

"Statutory style of Schedule A conveyance I (design) in consideration of the sum of paid to me [or, as the case may be, into the Bank (or to A.B. of _, and C.D. of _, two trustees appointed to receive the same)], pursuant to an Act passed, &c., intituled, &c., by the [here name the company], incorporated by the said Act, do hereby sell, alienate, dispone, convey, assign, and make over, from me, my heirs and successors, to the said company, their successors and assignees, for ever, according to the true intent and meaning of the said Act, all [describing the premises to be conveyed], together with all rights and pertinents thereto belonging, and all such right, title, and interest in and to the same as I and my foresaids are or shall become possessed of, or are by the said Act empowered to convey. [Here insert the conditions (if any) of the conveyance...."

Upon registration of the deed in the Land Register, ownership will transfer to the acquiring authority.

==== (2) General vesting declarations ====
Another form of transfer of ownership is the use of General Vesting Declarations (GVD) following the confirmation of a compulsory purchase order. GVDs are regulated by the Town and Country Planning (Scotland) Act 1997. Unlike a schedule conveyance, a GVD does not require any written consent of the current landowner.

===== Executing a General Vesting Declaration (GVD) =====
A GVD can be issued by the acquiring authority following the completion of a compulsory purchase order.

====== Pre-GVD requirements ======
Before issuing the GVD, the acquiring authority must have provided at least two months notice to the owner that they intend to issue a GVD.

====== Execution of GVD ======
The GVD must be made in a prescribed form and it must have at least 28 days minimum period before the vesting taking effect. However, the current prescribed form of GVDs is contained within the Compulsory Purchase of Land (Scotland) Regulations 2003 (SSI 2003/446). An example GVD can be found on the Registers of Scotland website:

"We (name of acquiring authority) in exercise of the powers conferred by section 195 of the Town and Country Planning (Scotland) Act 1997 and the authorisation given to us by the (title of the order) Compulsory Purchase Order 20 , ) [recorded in the Division of the General Register of Sasines applicable to the County of on (insert date of recording)] [registered in the Land Register of Scotland under title number(s) (insert title number/s) ] HEREBY DECLARE that the land described in the [First (only required if there is a Second schedule for burdens etc being preserved)] Schedule hereto, together with the right to enter upon and take possession of the same shall vest in us on (e) being the end of a period which meets the requirements of paragraph 1 as read with paragraph 4 of Schedule 15 to the Town and Country Planning (Scotland) Act 1997. (f) [Registration of the general vesting declaration [shall not extinguish the real burdens or servitudes] [shall not disapply the development management scheme] described in the Second Schedule hereto [but shall vary the real burdens and servitudes as specified in that Schedule] [shall extinguish all rights to enforce such real burdens or servitudes other than the rights of those benefited proprietors and holders of personal real burdens specified in that Schedule] [shall extinguish the real burdens and servitudes described in the Second Schedule hereto only in relation to those parts of the burdened property specified in that Schedule].]"

When a GVD has been issued, the acquiring authority must again send notice to all owners and occupiers (excluding short lease tenants) affected by the GVD in a prescribed form. Again, this form is found within the Compulsory Purchase of Land (Scotland) Regulations 2003.

====== Transfer of ownership ======
Following expiration of the notice period specified in the GVD, ownership and possession of the property is able to be acquired by the acquiring authority. However, the acquiring authority must register the GVD in the land's Title Sheet in the Land Register of Scotland in order to validly transfer ownership.

=== Stage Four: Compensation ===
Compensation is payable to the landowner who has involuntarily lost land through compulsory purchase. This follows a longstanding principle of Scots law, and other legal systems of the home nations, that the state must compensate for seizures of property.

==== History of compensation ====
Historically, a royal prerogative allowed the Crown to acquire land. However, as Lord Atkinson notes in Attorney-General v De Keyser's Royal Hotel Limited:

“The conclusion, as I understand it, is this: that it does not appear that the Crown has ever taken... the land of the subject without paying for it, and that there is no trace of the Crown having, even in the times of the Stuarts, exercised or asserted the power or right to do so by virtue of the Royal Prerogative."

In Scots law, the case of Burmah Oil Company (Burma Trading) v The Lord Advocate also made reference to a right to compensation payable to unlawful deprivations. In this case, a company registered in Scotland owned oil installations in Burma (today Myanmar). During the Second World War, Burma had been invaded by the Empire of Japan in 1942. The British Government, which the Lord Advocate then acted as legal officer in Scotland for, had authorised the destruction of the company's oil installations as a consequence. The company sought financial compensation for their property's destruction. In the House of Lords, the law lords held that"

"there is no general rule that the prerogative can be exercised, even in time of war or imminent danger, by taking or destroying property without making payment for it"

==== Rules ====
In present times, the introduction of the Human Rights Act 1998 also includes protections to owners under Article 1 of Protocol 1 to the Convention for compensation. The current rules for compensation payable under compulsory purchase are largely found in the Land Compensation (Scotland) Act 1963. A full discussion of the rules for compensation in Scottish compulsory purchase can be found in Part 3 of the Scottish Law Commission's Discussion Paper of Compulsory Purchase (2014, SLC DP No: 159), available to view for free online.

== Human rights considerations ==
As the United Kingdom is a signatory of the European Convention of Human Rights (ECHR), and have introduced the ECHR into UK law under the Human Rights Act 1998. Under Article 1 of Protocol 1 to the Convention:

"Every natural or legal person is entitled to the peaceful enjoyment of his possessions. No one shall be deprived of his possessions except in the public interest and subject to the conditions provided for by law and by the general principles of international law. The preceding provisions shall not, however, in any way impair the right of a State to enforce such laws as it deems necessary to control the use of property in accordance with the general interest or to secure the payment of taxes or other contributions or penalties."

Therefore, landowners in Scotland are protected under the right to property from compulsory purchase of land except in accordance with the law. Where the state does exercise compulsory purchase, compensation must be paid. The exercise of compulsory purchase powers are also subject to UK administrative law.

A full discussion of human rights considerations in Scottish compulsory purchase can be found in Chapter 3 of the Scottish Law Commission's Discussion Paper of Compulsory Purchase (2014, SLC DP No: 159), available online.

== Reform ==
On 17 December 2014, the Scottish Law Commission (SLC) published a Discussion Paper, Discussion Paper of Compulsory Purchase (2014, SLC DP No: 159), on reform of the law of compulsory purchase. This was welcomed by the legal profession and other compulsory purchase practitioners who had argued that the current legislative framework is outdated. The discussion paper's view on the current law of compulsory purchase runs to 322 pages, but is succinctly summarised in the SLC's news release:

"The essential problem is that the law on compulsory purchase is largely set out in legislation passed between the middle of the nineteenth century and the middle of the twentieth century. It is accordingly largely out of date. This Discussion Paper sets out the current law on the matter, and asks questions about how it could be improved. It also deals with the question of compensation, with a view to ensuring that the owner of property receives proper recompense for his or her loss. The Paper suggests that there should be a new statute setting out the law so that everyone involved – public authorities, practitioners and landowners – can see clearly how the system works."

The Discussion Paper can be viewed on the Scottish Law Commission's website. Following its publication, the Scottish Law Commission opened a consultation on its proposals for reform, closing on 19 June 2015. The responses to this consultation were collated and compiled into a report, which was submitted to the Scottish Government on 22 September 2016. As of 2020, no further action has been taken by the Scottish Government.

== Compulsory purchases powers held by non-public bodies ==
Under legislation mainly delivered under the Scottish Government's land reform policies, certain rights to compulsory purchase land have been granted to non-public bodies. These include:

=== Crofters ===
Under the Crofters (Scotland) Act 1993, a crofter can apply to the Land Court of Scotland for an order authorising acquisition of the land he/she crofts.

=== Community bodies ===
Under the Land Reform (Scotland) Act 2003, community bodies have powers of compulsory purchase over the following land:

- Crofting communities have the right to compulsory acquire eligible crofting land under Part 3 of the Land Reform (Scotland) Act 2003.
- Community bodies have the right to compulsory acquire abandoned, neglected or detrimental land under Part 3A of the Land Reform (Scotland) Act 2003.
