= Waterworks Clauses Act 1863 =

Act of the Parliament of the United Kingdom

Waterworks Clauses Act 1863 (Note: Section 1.)
- Act of Parliament
- Parliament of the United Kingdom
- Long title: An Act for consolidating in One Act certain Provisions frequently inserted in Acts relating to Waterworks
- Citation: 26 & 27 Vict. c. 93
- Territorial extent: United Kingdom (Note: Section 11 applies the provisions relating to the security of reservoirs to England and Ireland, and to Scotland subject to variations.)

Dates
- Royal assent: 28 July 1863
- Commencement: 28 July 1863 (Note: Section 2.)
- Repealed: 1 October 1945: England and Wales; 16 May 1946: Scotland
Other legislation
Amends	Waterworks Clauses Act 1847
Repealed by	Water Act 1945: England and Wales; Water (Scotland) Act 1946: Scotland
Relates to	Companies Clauses Consolidation Act 1845; Companies Clauses Consolidation (Scotland) Act 1845; Lands Clauses Consolidation Act 1845; Lands Clauses Consolidation (Scotland) Act 1845; Railways Clauses Consolidation Act 1845; Railways Clauses Consolidation (Scotland) Act 1845; Markets and Fairs Clauses Act 1847; Gasworks Clauses Act 1847; Commissioners Clauses Act 1847; Waterworks Clauses Act 1847; Harbours, Docks and Piers Clauses Act 1847; Railways Clauses Act 1863; Companies Clauses Act 1863

Status: Repealed

Text of statute as originally enacted

The Waterworks Clauses Act 1863 (26 & 27 Vict. c. 93) was an act of the Parliament of the United Kingdom that consolidated into one act further provisions commonly inserted into local and special Acts authorising the construction of waterworks. Its provisions dealt with the security of reservoirs, the supply of water, the protection of water from waste and misuse, and the recovery of water rates.

The Railways Clauses Act 1863 (26 & 27 Vict. c. 92) and the Companies Clauses Act 1863 (c. 118) were passed in the same parliamentary session.

== Subsequent developments ==
The whole act was repealed for England and Wales by section 62 of, and the fifth schedule to, the Water Act 1945 (8 & 9 Geo. 6. c. 42), which came into force on 1 October 1945.

The whole act was repealed for Scotland by section 87 of, and the fifth schedule to, the Water (Scotland) Act 1946 (9 & 10 Geo. 6. c. 42), which came into force on 16 May 1946.
