= Waterworks Clauses Act 1847 =

Act of the Parliament of the United Kingdom

Waterworks Clauses Act 1847 (Note: Section 4.)
- Act of Parliament
- Parliament of the United Kingdom
- Long title: An Act for consolidating in one Act certain Provisions usually contained in Acts authorising the making of Waterworks for supplying Towns with Water.
- Citation: 10 & 11 Vict. c. 17
- Territorial extent: United Kingdom

Dates
- Royal assent: 23 April 1847
- Commencement: 23 April 1847 (Note: Section 1.)
- Repealed: England and Wales: 1 October 1945; Scotland: 16 May 1946
Other legislation
Amended by	Waterworks Clauses Act 1863; Perjury Act 1911; False Oaths (Scotland) Act 1933
Repealed by	England and Wales: Water Act 1945; Scotland: Water (Scotland) Act 1946
Relates to	Companies Clauses Consolidation Act 1845; Companies Clauses Consolidation (Scotland) Act 1845; Lands Clauses Consolidation Act 1845; Lands Clauses Consolidation (Scotland) Act 1845; Railways Clauses Consolidation Act 1845; Railways Clauses Consolidation (Scotland) Act 1845; Markets and Fairs Clauses Act 1847; Gasworks Clauses Act 1847; Commissioners Clauses Act 1847; Harbours, Docks and Piers Clauses Act 1847; Towns Improvement Clauses Act 1847; Cemeteries Clauses Act 1847; Town Police Clauses Act 1847Railways Clauses Act 1863; Waterworks Clauses Act 1863; Companies Clauses Act 1863

Status: Repealed

Text of statute as originally enacted

The Waterworks Clauses Act 1847 (10 & 11 Vict. c. 17) was an act of the Parliament of the United Kingdom that consolidated, in a single model act, the clauses commonly included in local acts of Parliament authorising the construction of waterworks for supplying towns with water.

== Subsequent developments ==
Sections 86 and 94, and sections 55 and 59 so far as they related to special acts with which the Waterworks Clauses Act 1863 was incorporated, were repealed by section 1 of, and the schedule to, the Statute Law Revision Act 1875 (38 & 39 Vict. c. 66), which came into force on 11 August 1875.

Section 84 of the act was repealed by the Statute Law Revision Act 1894 (57 & 58 Vict. c. 56), which came into force on 25 August 1894.

The whole act was repealed for England and Wales by section 62 of, and the fifth schedule to, the Water Act 1945 (8 & 9 Geo. 6. c. 42), which came into force on 1 October 1945. The whole act was repealed, for Scotland, by section 87 of, and the fifth schedule to, the Water (Scotland) Act 1946 (9 & 10 Geo. 6. c. 42), which came into force on 16 May 1946.

The whole act was repealed for the Republic of Ireland by sections 3 and 4(1) of, and schedule 1 to, the Water Services Act 2007.
