= Gasworks Clauses Act 1847 =

Act of the Parliament of the United Kingdom

Gasworks Clauses Act 1847 (Note: Section 4.)
- Act of Parliament
- Parliament of the United Kingdom
- Long title: An Act for consolidating in one Act certain provisions usually contained in Acts authorizing the making of Gasworks for supplying towns with Gas.
- Citation: 10 & 11 Vict. c. 15
- Territorial extent: United Kingdom

Dates
- Royal assent: 23 April 1847
- Commencement: 28 July 1863 (Note: Section 1.)
- Repealed: England and Wales and Scotland: 1 May 1949 (Note: The Gas (Vesting Date) Order 1949 (SI 1949/392).); Northern Ireland: 13 April 1977
Other legislation
Amended by	Gasworks Clauses Act 1871; Statute Law Revision Act 1875; Perjury Act 1911; Gas Undertakings Act 1929
Repealed by	England and Wales and Scotland: Gas Act 1948; Northern Ireland: Gas (Northern Ireland) Order 1977
Relates to	Companies Clauses Consolidation Act 1845; Companies Clauses Consolidation (Scotland) Act 1845; Lands Clauses Consolidation Act 1845; Lands Clauses Consolidation (Scotland) Act 1845; Railways Clauses Consolidation Act 1845; Railways Clauses Consolidation (Scotland) Act 1845; Markets and Fairs Clauses Act 1847; Commissioners Clauses Act 1847; Waterworks Clauses Act 1847; Harbours, Docks and Piers Clauses Act 1847; Towns Improvement Clauses Act 1847; Cemeteries Clauses Act 1847; Town Police Clauses Act 1847Railways Clauses Act 1863; Waterworks Clauses Act 1863; Companies Clauses Act 1863; Gasworks Clauses Act 1871

Status: Repealed

Text of statute as originally enacted

The Gasworks Clauses Act 1847 (10 & 11 Vict. c. 15) was an act of the Parliament of the United Kingdom which consolidated the law concerning the authorisation of gasworks in the United Kingdom.

== Background ==
A plethora of acts of Parliament concerning gasworks had been enacted since the start of commercial operations in the 1800s and 1810s.

In 1847 a government commission was established to examine the system of gas supply. It concluded that there was seldom a benefit to the consumer of limited competition between undertakings.

A bill was introduced to consolidate provisions of all previous related acts into a single overarching act and to enact the recommendations of the commission.

== Provisions ==
The act limited company dividends to ten percent and codified the rights and obligations of gas undertakings and regulated dividends and prices.

The act comprises 50 sections:

- Section 1: Incorporation with special Act. Gasworks authorised by any Act of Parliament
- Section 2: Interpretation. Acts authorising the construction of gasworks.
- Section 3: Interpretations. Definitions.
- Section 4: Short title of this Act.
- Section 5: Incorporation of parts of this Act with other Acts.
- Section 6: Power break up streets, etc. under superintendence, and to open drains, and to lay pipes, make sewers, erect lamps, etc.
- Section 7: Undertakers not to enter on private land without consent.
- Section 8: Notice to be served on persons having control, etc. before breaking up streets or opening drains.
- Section 9: Streets or drains not to be broken up except under superintendence of persons having control of the same.
- Section 10: Streets, etc. broken up to be reinstated without delay. Roads, etc. to be fenced and lighted while opened; and to be kept in repair for a certain time afterwards.
- Section 11: Penalty for delay in reinstating streets, etc.
- Section 12: In case of delay, persons having control of streets, etc. may reinstate them.
- Section 13: Power of the undertakers to contract for lighting buildings, streets, etc.
- Section 14: Power to undertakers to let meters and fittings. Meters, etc. not liable to distraint for rent, ec.
- Section 15: Undertakers may enter buildings for ascertaining quantities of gas consumed. Penalty for obstructing them.
- Section 16: If rent is not paid, gas may be cut off, and rent and expenses recovered.
- Section 17: Power to take away pipes, etc. when supply of gas discontinued. Undue use of gas.
- Section 18: Penalty for fraudulently using the gas of the undertakers.
- Section 19: Penalty for wilfully removing or damaging pipes, etc.
- Section 20: Satisfaction for accidentally damaging pipes, etc.
- Section 21: Penalty on undertakers allowing washings, etc. produced in making gas to flow into streams, reservoirs, etc.
- Section 22: Penalty to be sued for in superior court within six months.
- Section 23: Daily penalty during the continuance of the offence.
- Section 24: Daily penalty during escape of gas after notice.
- Section 25: Penalty for fouling water by gas.
- Section 26: Power to open ground and examine gas pipes, to ascertain whether water is fouled by gas. Ground, etc. to be reinstated.
- Section 27: Expenses to abide result of examination.
- Section 28: How expenses shall be ascertained and recovered.
- Section 29: Nothing to exempt undertakers from being indicted for a nuisance.
- Section 30: Profits of the undertakers limited.
- Section 31: If profits exceed the amount limited, excess to be invested and form a reserved fund.
- Section 32: Reserved fund not to be resorted to meet an extraordinary claim, except on certificate.
- Section 33: When fund amounts to prescribed sum, interest to be applied to purposes of the undertaking.
- Section 34: If profits are less than the prescribed rate, deficiency may be supplied from the reserved fund.
- Section 35: If profits are more than the amount prescribed, rateable reduction to be made in the price of gas.
- Section 36: Court may order petitioner to pay costs of groundless petition.
- Section 37: Penalty on undertakers for refusing to produce books, vouchers, etc.
- Section 38: Annual account to be made up by undertakers.
- Section 39: Recovery of damages.
- Section 40: Railways Clauses Acts, as to damages, etc. to be incorporated with this and the special Act.
- Section 41: repealed by Statute Law Revision Act 1875 (38 & 39 Vict. c. 66)
- Section 42: Acts which may be done by one magistrate.
- Section 43: Penalties, etc. within metropolitan police district.
- Section 44: Persons giving false evidence liable to penalties of perjury.
- Section 45: Copies of special Act. Parliamentary Documents Deposit Act 1837 (7 Will. 4 & 1 Vict. c. 83)
- Section 46: Penalty on undertakers failing to keep or deposit such copies.
- Section 47: Saving as to Metropolitan Paving Act 1817 (57 Geo. 3. c. xxix), etc.
- Section 48: Saving as to rights of the crown.
- Section 49: Saving as to future Acts.
- Section 50: repealed by Statute Law Revision Act 1875 (38 & 39 Vict. c. 66)

== Subsequent developments ==
The act was amended by the Gasworks Clauses Act 1871 (34 & 35 Vict. c. 41)

The whole act was repealed for England and Wales and Scotland by section 76 of, and the fourth schedule to, the Gas Act 1948 (11 & 12 Geo. 6. c. 67), which came into force on 1 May 1949. The 1948 act nationalised the British gas industry.

The whole act was repealed for Northern Ireland by article 30(2) of, and part II of schedule 3 to, the Gas (Northern Ireland) Order 1977, which came into force on 13 April 1977.

== See also ==
- Oil and gas industry in the United Kingdom
