= Lands Clauses Consolidation Act 1845 =

Act of the Parliament of the United Kingdom

Lands Clauses Consolidation Act 1845 (Note: Section 4.)
- Act of Parliament
- Parliament of the United Kingdom
- Long title: An Act for consolidating in one Act certain provisions usually inserted in Acts authorizing the taking of lands for undertakings of a public nature.
- Citation: 8 & 9 Vict. c. 18
- Territorial extent: England and Wales; Ireland; (Note: Section 164.)

Dates
- Royal assent: 8 May 1845
- Commencement: 8 May 1845 (Note: Section 1.)
Other legislation
Amended by	Railways Act (Ireland) 1851; Lands Clauses Consolidation Acts Amendment Act 1860; Lands Clauses Consolidation Act 1869; Statute Law Revision Act 1875; Lands Clauses (Umpire) Act 1883; Lands Clauses (Taxation of Costs) Act 1895; Perjury Act 1911; Administration of Justice Act 1965; Compulsory Purchase Act 1965; Statute Law (Repeals) Act 1974; Statute Law Revision (Northern Ireland) Act 1980; Statute Law (Repeals) Act 1981; Statute Law (Repeals) Act 1993; Law Reform (Miscellaneous Provisions) (Northern Ireland) Order 2005
Relates to	Companies Clauses Consolidation Act 1845; Companies Clauses Consolidation (Scotland) Act 1845; Lands Clauses Consolidation (Scotland) Act 1845; Railways Clauses Consolidation Act 1845; Railways Clauses Consolidation (Scotland) Act 1845; Markets and Fairs Clauses Act 1847; Gasworks Clauses Act 1847; Commissioners Clauses Act 1847; Waterworks Clauses Act 1847; Railways Clauses Act 1863; Waterworks Clauses Act 1863; Companies Clauses Act 1863

Status: Amended

Text of statute as originally enacted

Revised text of statute as amended

Text of the Lands Clauses Consolidation Act 1845 as in force today (including any amendments) within the United Kingdom, from legislation.gov.uk.

The Lands Clauses Consolidation Act 1845 (8 & 9 Vict. c. 18) is an act of the Parliament of the United Kingdom that standardised provisions and definitions relating to the purchase of land by the government in England and Wales and Ireland.

The act was passed to standardise how the government acquires private land for public projects and to ensure fair compensation for property owners.

The Land Clauses Consolidation (Scotland) Act 1845 (8 & 9 Vict. c. 19) made similar provisions for Scotland.

As of 2026, the act remains in force in the United Kingdom.

== Subsequent developments ==
The following enactments were repealed by section 1 of, and part III of the schedule to, the Statute Law (Repeals) Act 1974, which came into force on 27 June 1974.

- Sections 59 and 60.
- In section 61, the words from the beginning to " annexed to ", the word " and " (following the word " surveyor "), the words " together therewith " and the words " and other documents ".
- Sections 135 and 140.

The act was amended by the Lands Clauses Consolidation Acts Amendment Act 1860 (23 & 24 Vict. c. 106), which allowed the Secretary of State for Defence to compulsory purchase land sought under the Defence Act 1842 (5 & 6 Vict. c. 94).

The act was further amended by the Lands Clauses Consolidation Act 1869 (32 & 33 Vict. c. 18), the Lands Clauses (Umpire) Act 1883 (46 & 47 Vict. c. 15) and the Lands Clauses (Taxation of Costs) Act 1895 (58 & 59 Vict. c. 11).

== Criticism ==
The Committee on Acquisition of Land Committee (1917–1919) chaired by Lord Justice Scott gave the following opinion on the act:

We are of opinion that the Lands Clauses Acts are out of date, and fail to give effect to the requirements of the community of today, and therefore that they should be repealed and replaced by a fresh code.
