= Markets and Fairs Clauses Act 1847 =

Act of the Parliament of the United Kingdom

Markets and Fairs Clauses Act 1847 (Note: Section 4.)
- Act of Parliament
- Parliament of the United Kingdom
- Long title: An Act for consolidating in One Act certain Provisions usually contained in Acts for constructing or regulating Markets and Fairs.
- Citation: 10 & 11 Vict. c. 14
- Territorial extent: United Kingdom

Dates
- Royal assent: 23 April 1847
- Commencement: 23 April 1847 (Note: Section 1.)
Other legislation
Amended by	Statute Law Revision Act 1875; Perjury Act 1911; False Oaths (Scotland) Act 1933; Justices of the Peace Act 1949; Statute Law Revision (Northern Ireland) Act 1980; Statute Law (Repeals) Act 1981; Statute Law (Repeals) Act 1993
Relates to	Companies Clauses Consolidation Act 1845; Companies Clauses Consolidation (Scotland) Act 1845; Lands Clauses Consolidation Act 1845; Lands Clauses Consolidation (Scotland) Act 1845; Railways Clauses Consolidation Act 1845; Railways Clauses Consolidation (Scotland) Act 1845; Gasworks Clauses Act 1847; Commissioners Clauses Act 1847; Waterworks Clauses Act 1847; Harbours, Docks and Piers Clauses Act 1847; Towns Improvement Clauses Act 1847; Cemeteries Clauses Act 1847; Town Police Clauses Act 1847; Fairs and Markets Act 1850; Railways Clauses Act 1863; Waterworks Clauses Act 1863; Companies Clauses Act 1863

Status: Amended

Text of statute as originally enacted

Revised text of statute as amended

Text of the Markets and Fairs Clauses Act 1847 as in force today (including any amendments) within the United Kingdom, from legislation.gov.uk.

The Markets and Fairs Clauses Act 1847 (10 & 11 Vict. c. 14) is an act of the Parliament of the United Kingdom that standardised provisions and definitions relating to markets and fairs in the United Kingdom.

When markets are created by statute, they typically incorporate section 13 of the act which makes it an offence to sell goods normally traded in the market (with certain exceptions). These monopolistic protections are exclusively available to legally established markets.

The Gasworks Clauses Act 1847 (10 & 11 Vict. c. 15), the Commissioners Clauses Act 1847 (c. 16) and the Waterworks Clauses Act 1847 (c. 17) passed at the same time as the act, standardised provisions and definitions relating to gasworks, commissioners and waterworks companies in the United Kingdom, respectively.

As of 2026, the act remains in force in the United Kingdom.

== Subsequent developments ==
Section 43 of the act from “provided that” onwards was repealed by section 1(1) of, and group 3 of part I of schedule 1 to, the Statute Law (Repeals) Act 1993, which came into force on 5 November 1993.

Section 15 and 20 of the act were repealed by section 1(1) of, and group 3 of part II of schedule 1 to, the Statute Law (Repeals) Act 1993, which came into force on 5 November 1993.
