= Gasworks Clauses Act 1871 =

Act of the Parliament of the United Kingdom

Gasworks Clauses Act 1871 (Note: Section 2.)
- Act of Parliament
- Parliament of the United Kingdom
- Long title: An Act to amend the Gasworks Clauses Act, 1847.
- Citation: 34 & 35 Vict. c. 41
- Territorial extent: United Kingdom

Dates
- Royal assent: 13 July 1871
- Commencement: 13 July 1871 (Note: The Acts of Parliament (Commencement) Act 1793.)
- Repealed: England and Wales and Scotland: 1 May 1949 (Note: The Gas (Vesting Date) Order 1949 (SI 1949/392).); Northern Ireland: 13 April 1977
Other legislation
Amends	Gasworks Clauses Act 1847
Amended by	Gas Undertakings Act 1934
Repealed by	England and Wales and Scotland: Water Act 1945, Water (Scotland) Act 1946 and Gas Act 1948; Northern Ireland: Gas (Northern Ireland) Order 1977

Status: Repealed

Text of statute as originally enacted

The Gasworks Clauses Act 1871 (34 & 35 Vict. c. 41) was an act of the Parliament of the United Kingdom which amended the law concerning the authorisation and operation of gasworks, including the keeping and publication of accounts, and testing of gas.

== Background ==
The Gasworks Clauses Act 1847(10 & 11 Vict. c. 15) had codified the rights and obligations of gas undertakings and regulated dividends and prices. The 1871 act obliged gas undertakings publish formal accounts. It also specified arrangements for the testing of gas.

== Provisions ==
The act comprised 46 sections in 9 parts plus 2 schedules.

- Section 1: Construction.
- Section 2: Short title.
- Section 3: Application of Act.
- Section 4: Interpretation.

General Provisions.

- Section 5: Prohibition against erecting gasworks elsewhere than on lands specified in special Act.
- Section 6: Sale of superfluous lands.
- Section 7: Receipts of guardians, etc. to be sufficient discharge.
- Section 8: For appointment of receiver.
- Section 9: Undertakers not exempted from indictment.
- Section 10: Power to take easements, etc. by agreement.

Supply of Gas to Owners and Occupiers of Premises.

- Section 11: Undertakers to furnish sufficient supply of gas to owners and occupiers within the limits of the special Act.
- Section 12: Quality of gas.
- Section 13: Undertakers may require consumers to use meters.
- Section 14: Undertakers to supply meters.
- Section 15: Meters not to be connected or disconnected without notice.
- Section 16: Nature and amount of security.
- Section 17: Consumer to keep his meter in proper order.
- Section 18: Power to Undertakers to let meters.
- Section 19: Undertakers to keep meter let for hire in repair.
- Section 20: Register of gas meters to be prima facie evidence.
- Section 21: Power to enter buildings for ascertaining quantities of gas consumed.
- Section 22: Power to remove meter and fittings.
- Section 23: Recovery of charges for gas.

Supply of gas to Local Authorities.

- Section 24: Supply and price of gas to public lamps.
- Section 25: As to consumption of gas supplied to the public lamps.
- Section 26: Governors for street lamps.
- Section 27: Settlement of differences by arbitration.

Testing of Gas.

- Section 28: Testing place.
- Section 29: Appointment and powers of gas examiners.
- Section 30: Two justices may appoint gas examiner.
- Section 31: Representation of Undertakers.
- Section 32: Mode of testing. In accordance with Part II of the Schedule A of this Act.
- Section 33: Report of gas examiner.
- Section 34: Access to testing place.

Accounts.

- Section 35: Accounts, etc.

Penalties.

- Section 36: Penalty for failure to supply gas. Penalties not cumulative.
- Section 37: Cost of experiment to be paid according to event.
- Section 38: Penalty for injuring meters.

Recovery of Gas Rents.

- Section 39: Incoming tenants not liable to pay arrears of gas rents, etc.
- Section 40: Recovery of rents, etc.
- Section 41: Recovery of sums due to Undertakers.

Legal Proceedings.

- Section 42: Contents of summons or warrant.
- Section 43: Warrant of distress shall include costs.
- Section 44: Summary proceedings.
- Section 45: Service of notices by Undertakers.
- Section 46: Liability to gas rent not to disqualify justices from acting.

Schedule A.

- Part I Regulations in respect of testing apparatus.
- Part II Rules as to mode of testing gas.
  - I Mode of testing for illuminating power.
  - II Mode of testing.

Schedule B. Form of Annual Accounts.

- A – Statement of Share Capital,
- B – Statement of Loan Capital,
- C – Capital Account,
- D – Revenue Account,
- E – Profit and Loss Account (net revenue),
- F – Reserved Fund Account,
- G – Statement of Coals,
- H – Statement of Residual Products,
- I – General Balance Sheet,

== Subsequent developments ==
The whole act was repealed for England and Wales and Scotland by section 76 of, and the fourth schedule to, the Gas Act 1948 (11 & 12 Geo. 6. c. 67), which came into force on 1 May 1949. The 1948 act nationalised the British gas industry.

The whole act was repealed for Northern Ireland by article 30(2) of, and part II of schedule 3 to, the Gas (Northern Ireland) Order 1977, which came into force on 13 April 1977.

== See also ==
- Oil and gas industry in the United Kingdom
