= Law Reform (Miscellaneous Provisions) (Northern Ireland) Order 2005 =

Order in Council for Northern Ireland

Law Reform (Miscellaneous Provisions) (Northern Ireland) Order 2005 (Note: Article 1(1).)
- Statutory Instrument
- Parliament of the United Kingdom
- Citation: SI 2005/1452 (N.I. 7)
- Territorial extent: Northern Ireland

Dates
- Made: 7 June 2005
- Commencement: 14 June 2005 (Part I) (Note: Article 1(3).); 7 July 2005 (Part IV and Articles 22 and 23) (Note: Article 1(4).); 15 November 2005 (Articles 3 to 15, 20 and 21, Schedule 1, and Article 24 and Schedule 2, except so far as they repeal the Colonial Solicitors Act 1900 and Article 5(5) of the Solicitors (Northern Ireland) Order 1976) (Note: Article 1(2). The Law Reform (Miscellaneous Provisions) (2005 Order) (Commencement and Transitional Saving) Order (Northern Ireland) 2005 (SR 2005/494 (C. 34)), article 2(1).); 1 February 2006 (Article 19, and the repeals of the Colonial Solicitors Act 1900 and Article 5(5) of the Solicitors (Northern Ireland) Order 1976) (Note: Article 1(2). The Law Reform (Miscellaneous Provisions) (2005 Order) (Commencement and Transitional Saving) Order (Northern Ireland) 2005 (SR 2005/494 (C. 34)), article 2(2).)

Other legislation
- Amends: Companies Clauses Consolidation Act 1845; Lands Clauses Consolidation Act 1845; Commissioners Clauses Act 1847; Cemeteries Clauses Act 1847; Literary and Scientific Institutions Act 1854; Open Spaces Act 1906; Pig Production Development Act (Northern Ireland) 1964; Fisheries Act (Northern Ireland) 1966; Industrial and Provident Societies Act (Northern Ireland) 1969; Census Act (Northern Ireland) 1969; Powers of Attorney Act (Northern Ireland) 1971; Local Government Act (Northern Ireland) 1972; Health and Personal Social Services (Northern Ireland) Order 1972; Enterprise Ulster (Northern Ireland) Order 1973; Solicitors (Northern Ireland) Order 1976; Consumer Transactions (Restrictions on Statements) Order 1976; Health and Safety at Work (Northern Ireland) Order 1978; Administration of Estates (Northern Ireland) Order 1979; Housing (Northern Ireland) Order 1981; Supply of Goods and Services Act 1982; Probation Board (Northern Ireland) Order 1982; General Consumer Council (Northern Ireland) Order 1984; Mental Health (Northern Ireland) Order 1986; Insolvency (Northern Ireland) Order 1989; Laganside Development (Northern Ireland) Order 1989; Limitation (Northern Ireland) Order 1989; Health and Personal Social Services (Special Agencies) (Northern Ireland) Order 1990Tourism (Northern Ireland) Order 1992; Industrial Relations (Northern Ireland) Order 1992; Damages Act 1996; Family Homes and Domestic Violence (Northern Ireland) Order 1998; Industrial Development Act (Northern Ireland) 2002; See § Repealed enactments
- Repeals/revokes: See § Repealed enactments
- Made under: Northern Ireland Act 2000
- Amended by: Companies Act 2006; Companies Act 2006 (Consequential Amendments, Transitional Provisions and Savings) Order 2009

Status: Amended

Text of statute as originally enacted

Revised text of statute as amended

Text of the Law Reform (Miscellaneous Provisions) (Northern Ireland) Order 2005 as in force today (including any amendments) within the United Kingdom, from legislation.gov.uk.

The Law Reform (Miscellaneous Provisions) (Northern Ireland) Order 2005 (SI 2005/1452 (N.I. 7)) is an Order in Council which reformed several unconnected areas of the law of Northern Ireland.

The order was made by the Queen in Council on 7 June 2005, in exercise of the powers conferred by paragraph 1(1) of the schedule to the Northern Ireland Act 2000, a draft of the Order having been approved by resolution of each House of Parliament.

== Provisions ==
Schedule 1 to the order made a series of consequential amendments to earlier enactments requiring instruments to be executed "under seal", replacing that requirement with a requirement that the instrument be executed as a deed, in consequence of the reforms made by Part II.

Part II simplified the formalities for the execution of deeds and other instruments by individuals, and abolished the rule in Pigot's Case and the rule in Bain v Fothergill. Part III amended the Family Homes and Domestic Violence (Northern Ireland) Order 1998, including extending the definition of "cohabitees" to include same-sex couples. Part IV abolished the presumption of advancement and the common law duty of a husband to maintain his wife, and abolished the rule whereby savings from a housekeeping allowance paid by a husband to a wife belonged to the husband. Part V repealed the Colonial Solicitors Act 1900 and the Trading Stamps Act (Northern Ireland) 1965, and made related amendments.

=== Repealed enactments ===
Article 24 of the Order repealed 15 enactments, listed in schedule 2 to the order.

Citation	Short title	Extent of repeal
63 & 64 Vict. c. 14	Colonial Solicitors Act 1900	The whole act.
1965 c. 6 (N.I.)	Trading Stamps Act (Northern Ireland) 1965	The whole act.
1969 c. 19	Decimal Currency Act 1969	In Schedule 2, paragraph 24.
1971 c. 33 (N.I.)	Powers of Attorney Act (Northern Ireland) 1971	In section 1, subsection (2). In section 7, in subsection (2), the words "and, in the case of a deed, by affixing his own seal".
1973 c. 13	Supply of Goods (Implied Terms) Act 1973	Section 16.
1974 c. 39	Consumer Credit Act 1974	In Part II of Schedule 4, paragraphs 43 to 45.
SI 1976/582 (N.I. 12)	Solicitors (Northern Ireland) Order 1976	In Article 5, paragraph 5(5).
1977 c. 50	Unfair Contract Terms Act 1977	Section 7(5).
1982 c. 29	Supply of Goods and Services Act 1982	In section 1, subsection (2)(c). In section 6, subsection (2). In section 6, in subsection (3), the words "(subject to subsection (2) above)". In section 18(1), the definitions of "redemption" and "trading stamps".
SI 1986/1032 (N.I. 6)	Companies (Northern Ireland) Order 1986	Article 262(3)(c) and the preceding "or".
SI 1986/1035 (N.I. 9)	Companies Consolidation (Consequential Provisions) (Northern Ireland) Order 1986	In Part I of Schedule 1, the amendment to the Trading Stamps Act (Northern Ireland) 1965.
1987 c. 43	Consumer Protection Act 1987	In section 46, in subsection (1), in paragraph (d), the words "(including trading stamps)".
SI 1989/2405 (N.I. 19)	Insolvency (Northern Ireland) Order 1989	In Schedule 2, in paragraph 8, the words from "and for that purpose" to the end.
1994 c. 35	Sale and Supply of Goods Act 1994	In Schedule 2, paragraph 2.
SI 1998/1071 (N.I. 6)	Family Homes and Domestic Violence (Northern Ireland) Order 1998	Article 19.
