= Companies Clauses Consolidation Act 1845 =

Act of the Parliament of the United Kingdom

Companies Clauses Consolidation Act 1845 (Note: Section 4.)
- Act of Parliament
- Parliament of the United Kingdom
- Long title: An Act for consolidating in One Act certain Provisions usually inserted in Acts with respect to the Constitution of Companies incorporated for carrying on Undertakings of a public Nature.
- Citation: 8 & 9 Vict. c. 16
- Territorial extent: England and Wales; Ireland; (Note: Section 163.)

Dates
- Royal assent: 8 May 1845
- Commencement: 8 May 1845 (Note: Section 1.)
Other legislation
Amended by	Companies Clauses Consolidation Act 1888; Courts Act 1971; Statute Law (Repeals) Act 1976; Statute Law Revision (Northern Ireland) Act 1980; Statute Law (Repeals) Act 1981; Statute Law (Repeals) Act 1986; Statute Law (Repeals) Act 1993; Statute Law (Repeals) Act 2004; Law Reform (Miscellaneous Provisions) (Northern Ireland) Order 2005
Relates to	Joint Stock Companies Act 1844; Companies Clauses Consolidation (Scotland) Act 1845; Lands Clauses Consolidation Act 1845; Lands Clauses Consolidation (Scotland) Act 1845; Railways Clauses Consolidation Act 1845; Railways Clauses Consolidation (Scotland) Act 1845; Markets and Fairs Clauses Act 1847; Gasworks Clauses Act 1847; Commissioners Clauses Act 1847; Waterworks Clauses Act 1847; Railways Clauses Act 1863; Waterworks Clauses Act 1863; Companies Clauses Act 1863

Status: Amended

Text of statute as originally enacted

Revised text of statute as amended

Text of the Companies Clauses Consolidation Act 1845 as in force today (including any amendments) within the United Kingdom, from legislation.gov.uk.

The Companies Clauses Consolidation Act 1845 (8 & 9 Vict. c. 16) is an act of the Parliament of the United Kingdom that standardised provisions and definitions relating to joint stock companies in England and Wales and Ireland.

The act also prescribed the governance and shareholder protection rules that had to be included in future statutory incorporations.

The Companies Clauses Consolidation (Scotland) Act 1845 (8 & 9 Vict. c. 17) made similar provisions for Scotland.

As of 2026, the act remains in force in the United Kingdom.

== Subsequent developments ==
Section 158 of the act, including that section as incorporated in any other act, was repealed by section 1(1) of, and part XIX of schedule 1 to, the Statute Law (Repeals) Act 1976, which came into force on 27 May 1976.

Section 143 of the act was repealed by section 1(1) of, and group 1 of part I of schedule 1 to, the Statute Law (Repeals) Act 1986, which came into force on 2 May 1986.

Section 126 of the act was repealed by section 1(1) of, and group 3 of part I of schedule 1 to, the Statute Law (Repeals) Act 1993, which came into force on 5 November 1993.
