= False Oaths (Scotland) Act 1933 =

Act of the Parliament of the United Kingdom

False Oaths (Scotland) Act 1933 (Note: Section 9.)
- Act of Parliament
- Parliament of the United Kingdom
- Long title: An Act to consolidate and simplify the law of Scotland relating to false oaths, declarations, and statements.
- Citation: 23 & 24 Geo. 5. c. 20
- Territorial extent: United Kingdom

Dates
- Royal assent: 28 June 1933
- Commencement: 28 June 1933 (Note: The Acts of Parliament (Commencement) Act 1793.)
- Repealed: 28 March 2011 (Note: The Criminal Justice and Licensing (Scotland) Act 2010 (Commencement No. 8, Transitional and Savings Provisions) Order 2011.)
Other legislation
Amends	See § Repealed enactments
Repeals/revokes	See § Repealed enactments
Amended by	Criminal Justice (Scotland) Act 1949; Statute Law Revision Act 1950; Criminal Procedure (Scotland) Act 1975; Evidence (Proceedings in Other Jurisdictions) Act 1975; Administration of Justice Act 1977
Repealed by	Criminal Justice and Licensing (Scotland) Act 2010
Relates to	Criminal Law (Consolidation) (Scotland) Act 1995

Status: Repealed

Text of statute as originally enacted

Revised text of statute as amended

The False Oaths (Scotland) Act 1933 (23 & 24 Geo. 5. c. 20) was an act of the Parliament of the United Kingdom that consolidated enactments related to false oaths, declarations, and statements in Scotland.

== Provisions ==
=== Repealed enactments ===
Section 8 of the act repealed 59 enactments, listed in the schedule to the act, so far as they applied to Scotland.

Citation	Short title	Extent of repeal
42 Geo. 3. c. 116	Land Tax Redemption Act 1802	Section one hundred and ninety-three
48 Geo. 3. c. 110	Herring Fishery (Scotland) Act 1808	Section forty-nine from "and if any person" to the end of the section
54 Geo. 3. c. 159	Harbours Act 1814	Section twenty-five
7 & 8 Geo. 4. c. 53	Excise Management Act 1827	Section thirty-one
9 Geo. 4. c. 29	Circuit Courts (Scotland) Act 1828	Section thirteen from "and if any Quaker making such affirmation" to "perjury are liable"
11 Geo. 4. & 1 Will. 4. c. 54	Fisheries (Scotland) Act 1830	Section three from "and if any person" to the end of the section
2 & 3 Will. 4. c. 53	Army Prize Money Act 1832	Section forty-five. Section forty-nine from "or shall knowingly take a false oath" to "other military service"
3 & 4 Will. 4. c. 49	Quakers and Moravians Act 1833	Section one from "and if any such person" to "notwithstanding"
5 & 6 Will. 4. c. 62	Statutory Declarations Act 1835	Section five. Section twelve from "and all and every" to the end. Section eighteen from "and if any declaration" to the end. Section twenty-one
1 & 2 Vict. c. 77	Quakers and Moravians Act 1838	Section one from "and if any such person" to "are or shall be subject"
1 & 2 Vict. c. 105	Oaths Act 1838	In section one, the word "either" and the words "or a witness or a deponent" and from "every such person" to the end
3 & 4 Vict. c. 18	Tobacco Act 1840	Section ten from "and if such declaration" to the end of the section
3 & 4 Vict. c. 97	Railway Regulation Act 1840	Section four
10 & 11 Vict. c. 14	Markets and Fairs Clauses Act 1847	Section fifty-seven
10 & 11 Vict. c. 15	Gas Works Clauses Act 1847	Section forty-four
10 & 11 Vict. c. 16	Commissioners Clauses Act 1847	Sections thirteen and one hundred and eight
10 & 11 Vict. c. 17	Waterworks Clauses Act 1847	Section eighty-nine
10 & 11 Vict. c. 27	Harbours Docks and Piers Clauses Act 1847	Section ninety-six
11 & 12 Vict. c. 36	Entail (Scotland) Act 1848	Section six from "and any person who" to the end of the section
15 & 16 Vict. c. 56	Pharmacy Act 1852	Section sixteen from "shall wilfully" to "under this Act or"
15 & 16 Vict. c. 57	Election Commissioners Act 1852	Section thirteen
17 & 18 Vict. c. 80	Registration of Births, Deaths and Marriages (Scotland) Act 1854	Section sixty. Section sixty-two, from "or shall wilfully insert" to "any false certificate" and from "or shall certify" to "part thereof"
19 & 20 Vict. c. 113	Foreign Tribunals Evidence Act 1856	Section three from "and if upon such oath" to the end of the section
21 & 22 Vict. c. 90	Medical Act 1858	Section thirty-nine
22 Vict. c. 20	Evidence by Commission Act 1859	Section two
26 & 27 Vict. c. 87	Trustee Savings Banks Act 1863	Section forty-nine from "and if upon such oath" to the end of the section
27 & 28 Vict. c. 114	Improvement of Land Act 1864	Section five
29 & 30 Vict. c. 62	Crown Lands Act 1866	Section twenty-nine
29 & 30 Vict. c. 108	Railway Companies Securities Act 1866	In section seventeen the words "on conviction thereof on indictment to fine or imprisonment or" so far as relates to indictable offences under section sixteen
31 & 32 Vict. c. 24	Capital Punishment Amendment Act 1868	Section nine
31 & 32 Vict. c. 45	Sea Fisheries Act 1868	Section thirty-two from "and any person who wilfully" to "guilty of perjury"
31 & 32 Vict. c. 119	Regulation of Railways Act 1868	In section eight from "any person who" to "perjury"
31 & 32 Vict. c. 121	Pharmacy Act 1868	Section fourteen from "and any person who shall" to "assisting him therein"
34 & 35 Vict. c. 36	Pensions Commutation Act 1871	In section nine, the words "shall be deemed to be guilty of a misdemeanour and" and "and to be imprisoned for any term not exceeding two years with or without hard labour"
34 & 35 Vict. c. 78	Regulation of Railways Act 1871	In section ten the words "on conviction thereof on indictment to fine and imprisonment or"
35 & 36 Vict. c. 93	Pawnbrokers Act 1872	Section twenty-nine from "If any person makes a declaration" to the end
36 & 37 Vict. c. 60	Extradition Act 1873	Section five from "Every person who" to "perjury"
38 & 39 Vict. c. 89	Public Works Loans Act 1875	Section forty-four from "who when examined" to "false evidence or"
39 & 40 Vict. c. 36	Customs Consolidation Act 1876	Section thirty-six from "and any witness" to "penalties thereof"
41 & 42 Vict. c. 33	Dentists Act 1878	Section thirty-five
44 & 45 Vict. c. 62	Veterinary Surgeons Act 1881	Section eleven
46 & 47 Vict. c. 51	Corrupt and Illegal Practices Prevention Act 1883	In section thirty-three, subsection (7), from "and on conviction" to "perjury"
50 & 51 Vict. c. 28	Merchandise Marks Act 1887	In section eight, subsection (3), the words "on conviction on indictment to the penalties of perjury and"
50 & 51 Vict. c. 47	Trustee Savings Banks Act 1887	Subsection (5) of section two
51 & 52 Vict. c. 46	Oaths Act 1888	Section one from "and if any person" to the end of the section
52 & 53 Vict. c. 10	Commissioners for Oaths Act 1889	Section seven
54 & 55 Vict. c. 70	Markets and Fairs (Weighing of Cattle) Act 1891	In section three the words "false or"
59 & 60 Vict. c. 25	Friendly Societies Act 1896	In section eighty-seven the words "false or"
60 & 61 Vict. c. 38	Public Health (Scotland) Act 1897	Section ten from "if any person" to "penalties thereof; and"
62 & 63 Vict. c. 23	Anchors and Chain Cables Act 1899	In section thirteen the words "or (iii) make any false statement in a certificate of proof"
2 Edw. 7. c. 8	Cremation Act 1902	In section eight, subsection (2), the words "declaration or"
6 Edw. 7. c. 40	Marriage with Foreigners Act 1906	Subsection (2) of section one
7 Edw. 7. c. 24	Limited Partnerships Act 1907	Section twelve
9 Edw. 7. c. 49	Assurance Companies Act 1909	In section twenty-four the words "on conviction on indictment to fine and imprisonment or"
5 & 6 Geo. 5. c. 91	Midwives (Scotland) Act 1915	Section nineteen
8 & 9 Geo. 5. c. 40	Income Tax Act 1918	Section two hundred and twenty-eight
13 & 14 Geo. 5. c. 10	Agricultural Holdings (Scotland) Act 1923	Subsection (4) of section sixteen
19 & 20 Geo. 5. c. 23	Companies Act 1929	Section three hundred and sixty-three
19 & 20 Geo. 5. c. 29	Government Annuities Act 1929	Subsection (4) of section thirty-two, subsections (3) and (4) of section sixty-two

== Subsequent developments ==
The offences that were previously contained in the act were consolidated into the Criminal Law (Consolidation) (Scotland) Act 1995.

The whole act was repealed by section 206(1) of, and paragraph 3 of schedule 7 to, the Criminal Justice and Licensing (Scotland) Act 2010 (asp 13), which came into force on 28 March 2011.
