= Gas (Northern Ireland) Order 1977 =

Order in Council for Northern Ireland

Gas (Northern Ireland) Order 1977 (Note: Article 1.)
- Statutory Instrument
- Citation: SI 1977/596 (N.I. 7)
- Territorial extent: Northern Ireland

Dates
- Made: 30 March 1977
- Commencement: 13 April 1977 (Note: Article 1.)
- Revoked: 10 June 1996 (Note: The Gas (1996 Order) (Commencement) Order (Northern Ireland) 1996 (SR 1996/216 (C. 8)).)
Other legislation
Amends	Public Utilities (Emergency Powers) Act (Northern Ireland) 1972; Electricity and Gas Undertakings (Financial Provisions) (Northern Ireland) Order 1977; See § Repealed enactments
Repeals/revokes	See § Repealed enactments
Amended by	Gas (Amendment) (Northern Ireland) Order 1984; Companies Consolidation (Consequential Provisions) (Northern Ireland) Order 1986; Companies (No. 2) (Northern Ireland) Order 1990; Street Works (Northern Ireland) Order 1995
Revoked by	Gas (Northern Ireland) Order 1996

Status: Repealed

Text of statute as originally enacted

The Gas (Northern Ireland) Order 1977 (SI 1977/596 (N.I. 7)) was an Order in Council made under the Northern Ireland Act 1974 that consolidated and amended enactments relating to the supply of gas in Northern Ireland.

== Provisions ==
=== Repealed enactments ===
Article 30(2) and (3) of the order repealed 13 enactments and 2 instruments, listed in parts I and II of schedule 3 to the order, respectively. Article 30(2) also provided that, where a local enactment incorporated any provisions of the Gasworks Clauses Act 1847 (10 & 11 Vict. c. 15) or the Gasworks Clauses Act 1871 (34 & 35 Vict. c. 41), or contained provisions substantially corresponding to them, those provisions ceased to have effect.

==== Part I: Repeals ====
Part I — Repeals
Citation	Short title	Extent of repeal
10 & 11 Vict. c. 15	Gasworks Clauses Act 1847	The whole act.
22 & 23 Vict. c. 66	Sale of Gas Act 1859	The whole act.
23 & 24 Vict. c. 146	Sale of Gas Act 1860	The whole act.
34 & 35 Vict. c. 41	Gasworks Clauses Act 1871	The whole act.
41 & 42 Vict. c. 49	Weights and Measures Act 1878	Sections 37, 41 and 66.
52 & 53 Vict. c. 21	Weights and Measures Act 1889	The whole act.
10 & 11 Geo. 5. c. 28	Gas Regulation Act 1920	The whole act.
1923 c. 24 (N.I.)	Electricity and Gas (Expenses) Act (Northern Ireland) 1923	The whole act.
1939 c. 38 (N.I.)	Gas Undertakings Act (Northern Ireland) 1939	The whole act.
1967 c. 29 (N.I.)	Increase of Fines Act (Northern Ireland) 1967	In part I of the schedule all the entries relating to— The Gasworks Clauses Act 1847; The Sale of Gas Act 1859; The Gasworks Clauses Act 1871; The Gas Regulation Act 1920.
1971 c. 19 (N.I.)	Gas Act (Northern Ireland) 1971	The whole act.
1972 c. 5 (N.I.)	Water Act (Northern Ireland) 1972	Section 11(1)(a).
SI 1977/427 (N.I. 3)	Electricity and Gas Undertakings (Financial Provisions) (Northern Ireland) Order 1977	In Article 4 the words "a gas undertaking or", "gas or", "the gas undertaking or, as the case may be," "gas or, as the case may be,".

==== Part II: Revocations ====
Part II — Revocations
Citation	Title	Extent of revocation
SR&O 1922/183	Government of Ireland (Adaptation of Enactments) (No. 3) Order 1922	Part III.
SR&O 1923/803	Government of Ireland (Miscellaneous Adaptations) (Northern Ireland) Order 1923	Article 4.

== Subsequent developments ==
The whole order was repealed by Article 71(4) of, and schedule 8 to, the Gas (Northern Ireland) Order 1996, which came into operation on 10 June 1996. Pending the coming into operation of the Street Works (Northern Ireland) Order 1995, the Gas (1996 Order) (Commencement) Order (Northern Ireland) 1996 provided for paragraphs 1(4) to (12) and 31 of schedule 1 to the 1977 order to continue to have effect, with modifications, for the purposes of paragraph 2 of schedule 3 to the 1996 order.
