= Railways Clauses Act 1863 =

Act of the Parliament of the United Kingdom

Railways Clauses Act 1863 (Note: Section 1.)
- Act of Parliament
- Parliament of the United Kingdom
- Long title: An Act for consolidating in One Act certain Provisions frequently inserted in Acts relating to Railways.
- Citation: 26 & 27 Vict. c. 92
- Territorial extent: United Kingdom

Dates
- Royal assent: 28 July 1863
- Commencement: 28 July 1863 (Note: The Acts of Parliament (Commencement) Act 1793.)
Other legislation
Amended by	Railways Act 1921; Transport Charges &c. (Miscellaneous Provisions) Act 1954; Transport Act 1962; Statute Law Revision Act 1966; Criminal Procedure (Scotland) Act 1975; Criminal Law Act 1977; Tribunals, Courts and Enforcement Act 2007
Relates to	Companies Clauses Consolidation Act 1845; Companies Clauses Consolidation (Scotland) Act 1845; Lands Clauses Consolidation Act 1845; Lands Clauses Consolidation (Scotland) Act 1845; Railways Clauses Consolidation Act 1845; Railways Clauses Consolidation (Scotland) Act 1845; Markets and Fairs Clauses Act 1847; Gasworks Clauses Act 1847; Commissioners Clauses Act 1847; Waterworks Clauses Act 1847; Waterworks Clauses Act 1863; Companies Clauses Act 1863

Status: Amended

Text of statute as originally enacted

Revised text of statute as amended

Text of the Railways Clauses Act 1863 as in force today (including any amendments) within the United Kingdom, from legislation.gov.uk.

The Railways Clauses Act 1863 (26 & 27 Vict. c. 92) is an act of the Parliament of the United Kingdom that standardised provisions and definitions relating to railways in the United Kingdom.

The Waterworks Clauses Act 1863 (26 & 27 Vict. c. 93) and the Companies Clauses Act 1863 (c. 118), passed at the same time as the act, standardised provisions and definitions relating to waterworks companies and companies in the United Kingdom.

As of 2026, the act remains in force in the United Kingdom.

== Background ==
The Railways Clauses Consolidation Act 1845 (8 & 9 Vict. c. 20) and the Railways Clauses Consolidation (Scotland) Act 1845 (c. 33) standardised provisions and definitions relating to railway companies in England and Wales and Ireland and Scotland, respectively.
