= Transport and Works Act 1992 =

Act of the Parliament of the United Kingdom

Transport and Works Act 1992 (Note: Section 72.)
- Act of Parliament
- Parliament of the United Kingdom
- Long title: An Act to provide for the making of orders relating to, or to matters ancillary to, the construction or operation of railways, tramways, trolley vehicle systems, other guided transport systems and inland waterways, and orders relating to, or to matters ancillary to, works interfering with rights of navigation; to make further provision in relation to railways, tramways, trolley vehicle systems and other guided transport systems; to amend certain enactments relating to harbours; and for connected purposes.
- Citation: 1992 c. 42
- Territorial extent: England and Wales; Scotland; (Note: Section 71.)

Dates
- Royal assent: 16 March 1992
- Commencement: various (Note: Section 70(1).)

Other legislation
- Amends: Railways Clauses Consolidation Act 1845; Railways Clauses Consolidation (Scotland) Act 1845; Railways Act 1921; Supply Powers Act 1975; Public Passenger Vehicles Act 1981; Channel Tunnel Act 1987
- Repeals/revokes: General Pier and Harbour Act 1861; General Pier and Harbour Act 1861, Amendment Act 1862; Military Tramways Act 1887; Notice of Accidents Act 1894; Railways (Electrical Power) Act 1903; Notice of Accidents Act 1906; Fishery Harbours Act 1915; Public Service Vehicles (Arrest of Offenders) Act 1975
- Amended by: Private Hire (London) Act 1998; Countryside and Rights of Way Act 2000; Statute Law (Repeals) Act 2004; Planning and Infrastructure Act 2025

Status: Amended

Text of statute as originally enacted

Revised text of statute as amended

Text of the Transport and Works Act 1992 as in force today (including any amendments) within the United Kingdom, from legislation.gov.uk.

The Transport and Works Act 1992 (c. 42) (TWA) is an act of the Parliament of the United Kingdom that was enacted to provide a system by which the construction of rail transport, tramway, inland waterway and harbour infrastructure could proceed in the UK by order of the Secretary of State for Transport rather than, as before, on the passing of a private bill.

Permissions granted under the TWA are issued in the form of a Transport and Works Act Order, often abbreviated to TWAO.

== Background ==
The TWA was introduced as a response to criticism by members of Parliament of the private-bill-based approach to the approval of transport infrastructure projects in the UK. Private bills were, from the nineteenth century onwards, the only way to gain authorisation for such infrastructure. However, work associated with the drafting and sponsorship of such bills was viewed by a Joint Committee on Private Bill Procedure, set up in 1987, as unduly onerous for parliamentary representatives. The provisions of the TWA mirrored and augmented the development of the UK planning system in the twentieth century, which provided an alternative route for authorisation of certain planning matters.
