= Water Act 1945 =

Act of the Parliament of the United Kingdom

Water Act 1945 (Note: Section 63(1).)
- Act of Parliament
- Parliament of the United Kingdom
- Long title: An Act to make provision for the conservation and use of water resources and for water supplies and for purposes connected therewith.
- Citation: 8 & 9 Geo. 6. c. 42
- Territorial extent: England and Wales (Note: Section 63(2).)

Dates
- Royal assent: 15 June 1945
- Commencement: 1 October 1945 (Note: Section 63(3).)
Other legislation
Amends	Public Health Act 1936
Repeals/revokes	Waterworks Clauses Act 1847; Waterworks Clauses Act 1863
Amended by	Water Act 1948; Water Resources Act 1963; London Government Act 1963; Science and Technology Act 1965; Compulsory Purchase Act 1965; New Towns Act 1965; Theft Act 1968; Building Act 1984; Water Act 1989; Water Consolidation (Consequential Provisions) Act 1991

Status: Partially repealed

Text of statute as originally enacted

Revised text of statute as amended

Text of the Water Act 1945 as in force today (including any amendments) within the United Kingdom, from legislation.gov.uk.

The Water Act 1945 (8 & 9 Geo. 6. c. 42) is an act of the Parliament of the United Kingdom, introduced by the coalition government and intended to expand and support the national water supply in England and Wales. It marked the beginning of a national water supply policy, required water suppliers to supply water to non-domestic customers for the first time, and introduced the concept of abstraction licensing.

== Background ==
The supply of water for domestic users in England and Wales was originally part of a concern for public health. As urban populations grew in the early nineteenth century, water was provided either by local authorities or by private companies, each of which obtained its powers from Parliament by obtaining local acts. The scope of these acts varied considerably, and an attempt was made to provide some uniformity by the passing of the Waterworks Clauses Act 1847 (26 & 27 Vict. c. 93) and the Waterworks Clauses Act 1863 (26 & 27 Vict. c. 93). These provided general guidelines for new local acts, which were expected to be based upon the guidelines. Further legislation to define how domestic water supply undertakings should operate was enshrined in the Public Health Act 1875 (38 & 39 Vict. c. 55) and the Public Health Act 1936.

As urban populations grew, so did the demands for water, and the statutory providers sought sources of water outside of their local area, often in more remote upland regions. Each such development required its own act of Parliament, and the intentions of one statutory supplier often conflicted with local interests in the upland region, or with those of similar statutory suppliers also wanting to develop resources in the same region. Parliament considered each case in isolation, but there was no regional planning to consider the wider implications of any one scheme. There had been calls for a more structured approach to planning in 1869, when the Duke of Richmond had chaired the Royal Commission on Water Supply, and there were further calls in 1920, when the Board of Trade Water Power Resources Committee advocated a Water Commission for England and Wales, but nothing materialised. A little progress was made in 1924, when regional advisory water committees were set up, as a joint venture between the Ministry of Health and existing statutory suppliers. Their function was to co-ordinate schemes for water supply, which might involve more than one supplier. Government involvement in water supply was, however, limited to the supply of water for domestic consumption only.

== Scope ==
The act marked the beginning of a national water supply policy. It recognised the need for central government to supervise the statutory suppliers of water, and to be involved in the difficult issues of water supply. It also broke away from a concern purely for domestic water supply. For the first time, water suppliers were also required to supply water to non-domestic users. Although not fully defined in this act, it also marked the start of abstraction licensing, with powers to control new requests to abstract groundwater from aquifers in designated conservation areas.

Consisting of 65 sections, the act was organised into five parts, covering central and local planning, local organisation of water supplies, conservation and protection of water resources, powers and duties of local authorities and local undertakers, with the final part covering a number of general sections. This part also included five schedules, of which the fourth contained amendments to the Public Health Act 1936, and the fifth contained details of previous legislation which was repealed by the act.

It gave the Minister of Housing and Local Government the responsibility "to promote the conservation and proper use of water resources and the provision of water supplies in England and Wales and to secure the effective execution by water undertakers, under his control and direction, of a national policy relating to water." Thus the Minister had functions relating to the conservation of water for supply. This was to be achieved through abstraction licensing and ensuring that sources used for water supply did not become polluted. The other main ministerial function was the supervision of the companies providing a public water supply, and the rationalisation of the areas which they covered. Despite the mention of a national policy, the act contained little to achieve one, although the amalgamation of water supply undertakers was one strategy that the minister was given.

One significant benefit of the act was its impact on groundwater. The need to understand its behaviour had been outlined in a White Paper entitled "A National Water Policy" published in 1944, and the act required anyone constructing a well to inform the Department of Scientific and Industrial Research of their drilling and testing operations. Those abstracting water were required to keep proper records of the volumes of water taken.

In 1945, there were over 1,000 water suppliers in England and Wales, with 26 supplying half the volume of water used. Another 97 supplied a further quarter, and the remainder was split between 900 small undertakings. The act did not extend as far as allowing the nationalisation of these water suppliers, but it did give the minister power to order individual suppliers to amalgamate.

== Bibliography ==
- Labour Party Research Department (1950). "chapter 17". Facts and Figures for Socialists, 1951. London.
- Lees, M L (October 1985). "Inland Water Surveying in the United Kingdom" (PDF). Institute of Hydrology. Archived (PDF) from the original on 6 August 2020.
- Ofwat (2006). "The Development of the Water Industry in England and Wales" (PDF). OFWAT. Archived from the original (PDF) on 4 June 2015.
- Porter, Elizabeth (1978). Water Management in England and Wales. Cambridge University Press. ISBN 978-0-521-21865-8.
