= Railway Companies Meetings Act 1869 =

Act of the Parliament of the United Kingdom

Railway Companies Meetings Act 1869 (Note: Section 2.)
- Act of Parliament
- Parliament of the United Kingdom
- Long title: An Act to repeal so much of The Regulation of Railways Act, 1868 as relates to the approval by meetings of incorporated railway companies of bills and certificates for conferring further powers on those companies.
- Citation: 32 & 33 Vict. c. 6
- Territorial extent: United Kingdom

Dates
- Royal assent: 19 April 1869
- Commencement: 19 April 1869 (Note: The Acts of Parliament (Commencement) Act 1793.)
- Repealed: 25 August 1883
Other legislation
Amends	Regulation of Railways Act 1868
Repealed by	Statute Law Revision Act 1883

Status: Repealed

Text of statute as originally enacted

The Railway Companies Meetings Act 1869 (32 & 33 Vict. c. 6) was an act of the Parliament of the United Kingdom.

It repealed section 35 of the Regulation of Railways Act 1868 (31 & 32 Vict. c. 119), which related "to meetings of incorporated railway companies and the approval by such meetings of bills and certificates for conferring additional powers on those companies", with regard to any bill put before Parliament, or any application for a certificate made by a company, after 1 February 1869.

== Subsequent developments ==
The whole act was repealed by section 1 of, and the schedule to, the Statute Law Revision Act 1883 (46 & 47 Vict. c. 39), which came into force on 25 August 1883.

== Bibliography ==
- The practical statutes of the session 1869 (32 & 33 Victoria). William Paterson, 1869.
