= Harbours, Docks and Piers Clauses Act 1847 =

Act of the Parliament of the United Kingdom

Harbours, Docks and Piers Clauses Act 1847 (Note: Section 3.)
- Act of Parliament
- Parliament of the United Kingdom
- Long title: An Act for consolidating in One Act certain Provisions usually contained in Acts authorizing the making and improving of Harbours, Docks, and Piers.
- Citation: 10 & 11 Vict. c. 27
- Territorial extent: United Kingdom

Dates
- Royal assent: 11 May 1847
- Commencement: 11 May 1847 (Note: The Acts of Parliament (Commencement) Act 1793.)
Other legislation
Amended by	Crown Lands Act 1851; Statute Law Revision Act 1875; Crown Lands Act 1885; Statute Law Revision Act 1891; Statute Law Revision Act 1893; Statute Law Revision Act 1894; Perjury Act 1911; Forestry (Transfer of Woods) Act 1923; Supreme Court of Judicature (Consolidation) Act 1925; Harbours, Piers and Ferries (Scotland) Act 1937; Justices of the Peace Act 1949; Customs and Excise Act 1952; Crown Estate Act 1956; Crown Estate Act 1961; Harbours Act 1964; Compulsory Purchase Act 1965; Decimal Currency Act 1969; Post Office Act 1969; Courts Act 1971; Sheriff Courts (Scotland) Act 1971; Criminal Procedure (Scotland) Act 1975; Local Government (Scotland) Act 1973; Criminal Law Act 1977; Statute Law Revision (Northern Ireland) Act 1980; Statute Law (Repeals) Act 1981; Criminal Justice Act 1982; Debtors (Scotland) Act 1987; Statute Law (Repeals) Act 1993; Local Government etc. (Scotland) Act 1994; Commissioners for Revenue and Customs Act 2005; Bankruptcy and Diligence etc. (Scotland) Act 2007; Justice Act (Northern Ireland) 2015
Relates to	Markets and Fairs Clauses Act 1847; Gasworks Clauses Act 1847

Status: Amended

Text of statute as originally enacted

Revised text of statute as amended

Text of the Harbours, Docks and Piers Clauses Act 1847 as in force today (including any amendments) within the United Kingdom, from legislation.gov.uk.

The Harbours, Docks and Piers Clauses Act 1847 (10 & 11 Vict. c. 27) is an act of the Parliament of the United Kingdom which governs harbours, docks and piers.

== Port police ==
The act allows two justices of the peace to swear in port police officers as "special constables" with jurisdiction within the limits of the harbour, dock, pier and premises of the port company, and within one mile of the same. Two justices may also dismiss such a constable. The act uses the term 'special constable'; at the time this act was passed 'special constable' meant any constable who was not a member of a territorial police force.

Officers of approved port police forces were issued with the faithful service medal after the qualifying period of service.

== Subsequent developments ==
Section 84 of the act from “provided that” onwards was repealed by section 1(1) of, and group 3 of part I of schedule 1 to, the Statute Law (Repeals) Act 1993, which came into force on 5 November 1993.

== See also ==
- List of port police forces of the United Kingdom
