= Companies Clauses Act 1863 =

Act of the Parliament of the United Kingdom

Companies Clauses Act 1863 (Note: Section 1.)
- Act of Parliament
- Parliament of the United Kingdom
- Long title: An Act for consolidating in One Act certain Provisions frequently inserted in Acts relating to the Constitution and Management of Companies incorporated for carrying on Undertakings of a public Nature.
- Citation: 26 & 27 Vict. c. 118
- Territorial extent: United Kingdom

Dates
- Royal assent: 28 July 1863
- Commencement: 28 July 1863 (Note: The Acts of Parliament (Commencement) Act 1793.)
Other legislation
Amends	See § Repealed enactments
Repeals/revokes	See § Repealed enactments
Amended by	Statute Law (Repeals) Act 1993
Relates to	Companies Clauses Consolidation Act 1845; Companies Clauses Consolidation (Scotland) Act 1845; Railways Clauses Act 1863; Waterworks Clauses Act 1863

Status: Amended

Text of statute as originally enacted

Revised text of statute as amended

Text of the Companies Clauses Act 1863 as in force today (including any amendments) within the United Kingdom, from legislation.gov.uk.

The Companies Clauses Act 1863 (26 & 27 Vict. c. 118) is an act of the Parliament of the United Kingdom that standardised provisions and definitions relating to companies in the United Kingdom.

The Railways Clauses Act 1863 (26 & 27 Vict. c. 92) and the Waterworks Clauses Act 1863 (c. 93) were passed at the same time as the act.

As of 2026, the act remains in force in the United Kingdom.

== Background ==
The Companies Clauses Consolidation Act 1845 (8 & 9 Vict. c. 16) and the Companies Clauses Consolidation (Scotland) Act 1845 (c. 17) standardised provisions and definitions relating to companies in England and Wales and Ireland and Scotland, respectively.

== Subsequent developments ==
Section 2 of the act was repealed by section 1(1) of, and group 1 of part V of schedule 1 to, the Statute Law (Repeals) Act 1993, which came into force on 5 November 1993.
