= Commissioners Clauses Act 1847 =

Act of the Parliament of the United Kingdom

Commissioners Clauses Act 1847 (Note: Section 4.)
- Act of Parliament
- Parliament of the United Kingdom
- Long title: An Act for consolidating in One Act certain Provisions usually contained in Acts with respect to the Constitution and Regulation of Bodies of Commissioners appointed for carrying on Undertakings of a public Nature.
- Citation: 10 & 11 Vict. c. 16
- Territorial extent: United Kingdom

Dates
- Royal assent: 23 April 1847
- Commencement: 23 April 1847 (Note: The Acts of Parliament (Commencement) Act 1793.)
Other legislation
Amended by	Statute Law Revision Act 1891; Perjury Act 1911; False Oaths (Scotland) Act 1933; Justices of the Peace Act 1949; Common Informers Act 1951; Theft Act 1968; Courts Act 1971; Statute Law Revision (Northern Ireland) Act 1980; Statute Law (Repeals) Act 1981; Statute Law (Repeals) Act 1993; Law Reform (Miscellaneous Provisions) (Northern Ireland) Order 2005; Postal Services Act 2011
Relates to	Markets and Fairs Clauses Act 1847; Gasworks Clauses Act 1847; Waterworks Clauses Act 1847; Harbours, Docks, and Piers Clauses Act 1847; Towns Improvement Clauses Act 1847; Cemeteries Clauses Act 1847; Town Police Clauses Act 1847

Status: Amended

Text of statute as originally enacted

Revised text of statute as amended

Text of the Commissioners Clauses Act 1847 as in force today (including any amendments) within the United Kingdom, from legislation.gov.uk.

The Commissioners Clauses Act 1847 (10 & 11 Vict. c. 16) is an act of the Parliament of the United Kingdom that standardised provisions and definitions relating to commissioners in the United Kingdom.

The Markets and Fairs Clauses Act 1847 (10 & 11 Vict. c. 14), the Gasworks Clauses Act 1847 (c. 15), and the Waterworks Clauses Act 1847 (17) passed at the same time as the act, standardised provisions and definitions relating to markets and fairs, gasworks and waterworks companies in the United Kingdom, respectively.

As of 2026, the act remains in force in the United Kingdom.

== Subsequent developments ==
Section 11 and 98 of the act were repealed by section 1(1) of, and groups 1 and 3 of part I of schedule 1 to, the Statute Law (Repeals) Act 1993, which came into force on 5 November 1993.
