= Statute Law Revision (Northern Ireland) Act 1980 =

Act of the Parliament of the United Kingdom

Statute Law Revision (Northern Ireland) Act 1980 (Note: Section 2(1).)
- Act of Parliament
- Parliament of the United Kingdom
- Long title: An Act to revise the statute law of Northern Ireland by repealing obsolete, spent, unnecessary or superseded enactments.
- Citation: 1980 c. 59
- Territorial extent: Northern Ireland (Note: Section 2(2).)

Dates
- Royal assent: 13 November 1980
- Commencement: 13 November 1980 (Note: Section 4(b) of the Interpretation Act 1978.)
- Repealed: 19 November 1998
Other legislation
Repealed by	Statute Law (Repeals) Act 1998
Relates to	Repeal of Obsolete Statutes Act 1856; See Statute Law Revision Act

Status: Repealed

Text of statute as originally enacted

The Statute Law Revision (Northern Ireland) Act 1980 (c. 59) was an act of the Parliament of the United Kingdom.

== Provisions ==
=== Repealed enactments ===
Section 1 of the act repealed 167 enactments and revoked 26 instruments, listed in parts I to XIV of the schedule to the act.

==== Part I: Administration of Justice ====
Part I — Administration of Justice
Citation	Short title	Extent of repeal
21 & 22 Geo. 3. c. 11 (I)	Habeas Corpus Act (Ireland) 1781	In section 1, the words " or lord keeper of the great seal of Ireland for the time being ". In section 2, the words " or lord keeper " (wherever occurring) and the words " lord keeper ".
41 Geo. 3. c. 90	Crown Debts Act 1801	In section 5, the words " lord keeper, or lords commissioners for the custody of the great seal of Ireland " and " lord keeper, or lords commissioners of the great seal of Ireland ". In section 6, the words " lord keeper, or lords commissioners for the custody of the great seal of Ireland for the time being respectively " and " or them respectively ".
43 Geo. 3. c. 143	Public Officers Protection (Ireland) Act 1803	In section 6, the words from " and if the verdict " onwards.
53 Geo. 3. c. 107	Endowed Schools (Ireland) Act 1813	In section 16, the words " or to the commissioners for the custody of the great seal of Ireland for the time being " and " or to the commissioners for the custody of the great seal ", the words " or commissioners for the custody of the great seal " (wherever occurring), the words " or the commissioners for the custody of the great seal ", the words " or them " (after the words " in Ireland of private foundation, as to him "), and the words " or commissioners for the custody of the great seal, and they are hereby empowered " and " or their ".
11 Geo. 4 & 1 Will. 4. c. 65	Infants' Property Act 1830	In section 31, the words " or of sane mind ". In section 35, the words " or lord chancellor, intrusted as aforesaid " and " or lord chancellor ".
11 Geo. 4 & 1 Will. 4. c. 68	Carriers Act 1830	Section 10.
3 & 4 Will. 4. c. 41	Judicial Committee Act 1833	Sections 10 to 12.
4 & 5 Will. 4. c. 92	Fines and Recoveries (Ireland) Act 1834	In section 31, the words from " or the lord keeper " to " for the time being " (in the second place where they occur). In section 46, the words from " lord keeper " (in the first place where they occur) to " person or persons " (in the first place where they occur) and the words " lord keeper, or lords commissioners, or person or persons so " (wherever occurring). In section 47, the words from " lord keeper " to " person or persons ".
5 & 6 Will. 4. c. 55	Sheriffs (Ireland) Act 1835	Schedule 1.
6 & 7 Will. 4. c. 13	Constabulary (Ireland) Act 1836	In section 50, the words " plead the general issue and ", " who shall try the said issue " and " and such constable shall recover his costs of suit ".
1 & 2 Vict. c. 28	Bread (Ireland) Act 1838	In section 15, the words " or magistrates, justice or justices of the peace ".
8 & 9 Vict. c. 16	Companies Clauses Consolidation Act 1845	In section 3, the definition of " county " and in the definition of " justice " the words " county, city, borough, liberty or other ". In section 144, the words from " or more " to " service of the summons ", the words " or such two justices, as the case may be, " and the words from " and for that purpose " onwards.
8 & 9 Vict. c. 18	Lands Clauses Consolidation Act 1845	In section 3, the definition of " county " and in the definition of " justices " the words " county, city, liberty or " and the words " county, city, borough, liberty or " (wherever occurring).
8 & 9 Vict. c. 20	Railways Clauses Consolidation Act 1845	In section 3, the definition of " county " and in the definition of " justice " the words " county, city, borough, liberty or " (wherever occurring). In section 142, the words from " or more " to " service of the summons ", the words " or such two justices, as the case may be, " and the words from " and for that purpose " onwards.
10 & 11 Vict. c. 14	Markets and Fairs Clauses Act 1847	In section 3, the definitions of " county " and " quarter sessions ".
10 & 11 Vict. c. 16	Commissioners Clauses Act 1847	In section 3, the definitions of " county " and " quarter sessions " and in the definition of " justice " the words from " and where any matter " onwards.
10 & 11 Vict. c. 27	Harbours, Docks, and Piers Clauses Act 1847	In section 3, the definitions of " county " and " quarter sessions ".
10 & 11 Vict. c. 65	Cemeteries Clauses Act 1847	In section 3, the definitions of " county " and " quarter sessions ".
10 & 11 Vict. c. 89	Town Police Clauses Act 1847	In section 3, the definitions of " county " and " quarter sessions " and in the definition of " justice " the words " county, city, borough, liberty or other " and the words from " and where any matter " onwards.
14 & 15 Vict. c. 90	Fines (Ireland) Act 1851	In section 18, the definition of " county ".
17 & 18 Vict. c. 17	Boundary Survey (Ireland) Act 1854	In section 9, the words from " of the peace " (in the second place where they occur) onwards. In section 16, the words from " and where " to " separate county ".
17 & 18 Vict. c. 103	Towns Improvement (Ireland) Act 1854	In section 41, the words from " for the division or place " (in the first place where they occur) onwards.
20 & 21 Vict. c. 83	Obscene Publications Act 1857	In section 1, the words " or any two justices in petty sessions for the district ", the words " or justices " (in the last three places where they occur) and the words " or they " (wherever occurring). In section 4, the words from " for the county " to " so acted " and from " and entering " to " think proper ".
23 & 24 Vict. c. 154	Landlord and Tenant Law Amendment Act, Ireland, 1860	In section 1, the definition of " county ". Sections 61 and 62.
25 & 26 Vict. c. 114	Poaching Prevention Act 1862	In section 1, in the definitions of " justice " and " justices " the words " of or " and " county, riding, division, liberty, city, borough, or ".
26 & 27 Vict. c. 112	Telegraph Act 1863	In section 3, the definition of " two justices ".
33 & 34 Vict. c. 46	Landlord and Tenant (Ireland) Act 1870	In section 70, the definition of " county ".
44 & 45 Vict. c. 49	Land Law (Ireland) Act 1881	In section 57, the definition of " County ".
1 Edw. 8 & 1 Geo. 6. c. 8 (N.I.)	Arbitration Act (Northern Ireland) 1937	Section 25.
1954 c. 11 (N.I.)	Common Informers Act (Northern Ireland) 1954	In the Schedule, the entries relating to the Linen (Trade Marks) Act 1744, the Collection of Revenue Act (Ireland) 1795, the Plate Assay (Ireland) Act 1807, the Ecclesiastical Proctors (Ireland) Act 1814, the Bankers (Ireland) Act 1825, the Registry of Deeds (Ireland) Act 1832, the Linen Manufactures (Ireland) Act 1835, the Private Lunatic Asylums (Ireland) Act 1842, the Civil Bill Courts (Ireland) Act 1851, the Civil Bill Courts Procedure Amendment Act (Ireland) 1864 and the County Officers and Courts (Ireland) Act 1877.
1970 c. 16 (N.I.)	Maintenance and Affiliation Orders Act (Northern Ireland) 1970	Section 1(1) and (3). The Schedule.

==== Part II: Appeals ====
Part II — Appeals
Citation	Short title	Extent of repeal
57 Geo. 3. c. 108	Tolls (Ireland) Act 1817	Section 6.
1 & 2 Vict. c. 56	Poor Relief (Ireland) Act 1838	Sections 106, 107, 109 and 112.
8 & 9 Vict. c. 20	Railways Clauses Consolidation Act 1845	Section 60.
12 & 13 Vict. c. 104	Poor Relief (Ireland) Act 1849	The whole act, so far as unrepealed.
63 & 64 Vict. c. 27	Railway Employment (Prevention of Accidents) Act 1900	Section 11(2).
6 Edw. 7. c. 34	Prevention of Corruption Act 1906	Section 2(6).
6 Edw. 7. c. 43	Street Betting Act 1906	Section 4.
7 Edw. 7. c. 53	Public Health Acts Amendment Act 1907	Section 7(1)(c).
8 Edw. 7. c. 24	Summary Jurisdiction (Ireland) Act 1908	Section 5.
9 Edw. 7. c. 12	Marine Insurance (Gambling Policies) Act 1909	Section 1(7).
23 & 24 Geo. 5. c. 6 (N.I.)	Stormont Regulation and Government Property Act (Northern Ireland) 1933	In section 3(1), the words from " and a person " onwards.
1946 c. 7 (N.I.)	Shops Act (Northern Ireland) 1946	In section 9(12), the words from " and the appellant " onwards. Section 37(5).
1958 c. 13 (N.I.)	Diseases of Animals Act (Northern Ireland) 1958	Section 49.

==== Part III: Constitutional ====
Part III — Constitutional
Citation	Short title	Extent of repeal
6 Anne c. 8 (I)	Privilege of Parliament Act (Ireland) 1707	Sections 2 and 5.
10 & 11 Vict. c. 32	Landed Property Improvement (Ireland) Act 1847	In section 3, the words from " and shall " onwards.
31 & 32 Vict. c. 72	Promissory Oaths Act 1868	In section 8, the words from " in the case of the Clerical " to " therein referred to " and the words " each of ". In section 9, the words " and the Clerical Subscription Act 1865 ". In section 12, paragraph 2. In section 14, in paragraph 1, the words " The Clerical Subscription Act 1865 or ".
12 Geo. 5. c. 6 (N.I.)	Ministries of Northern Ireland Act (Northern Ireland) 1921	In the Schedule, the entries in column (2) relating to the Ministry of Home Affairs.
1944 c. 14 (N.I.)	Ministries Act (Northern Ireland) 1944	Section 2.
1955 c. 28 (N.I.)	Ministerial and Other Offices Act (Northern Ireland) 1955	The whole act, so far as unrepealed.
SI 1972/1999 (N.I. 22)	Local Government &c. (Northern Ireland) Order 1972	Article 2(5).
SI 1973/1086 (N.I. 14)	Salaries (Comptroller and Auditor-General and Others) (Northern Ireland) Order 1973	Article 3.

==== Part IV: Criminal Justice ====
Part IV — Criminal Justice
Citation	Short title	Extent of repeal
7 Will. 3. c. 17 (I)	Sunday Observance Act (Ireland) 1695	In section 3, the words " officer or officers " (in the first place where they occur), the words from " of the county " to " administer ", the words " or chief officer or officers ", the words from " or churchwardens " to " such offence shall be committed " and the words from " and to levy " to " raised thereby ".
6 Anne c. 17 (I)	Lotteries Act (Ireland) 1707	In section 2, the words " two justices of the peace, or chief " and " of any city or town corporate, where the offence shall be committed, ", the words " justices of the peace, or chief " (in the second place where they occur), the words " and required to summon the party complained of, and " and the words from " and by warrant " to " so offending ".
26 Geo. 3. c. 24 (I)	Forcible Entry Act (Ireland) 1786	In section 64, the words from " and be transported " to " Europe " and the words from " in like manner " onwards. In section 65, the words " presented or " (wherever occurring) and " presentment or " (wherever occurring), the words " or clerk of the peace respectively ", " or general quarter sessions " and " presentments or ", the words from " or other chief governor " to " for the time being ", the words " and transported as in cases of felony ", the words from " in like manner " (in the first place where they occur) to " realm " and the words from " in like manner " (in the second place where they occur) onwards. In section 66, the words " presented or " and the words from " and that the justices " onwards.
57 Geo. 3. c. 108	Tolls (Ireland) Act 1817	In section 5, the words from " of the county " onwards.
60 Geo. 3 & 1 Geo. 4. c. 1	Unlawful Drilling Act 1819	In section 2, the words from " and it shall be lawful " onwards.
4 Geo. 4. c. 48	Judgment of Death Act 1823	The whole act.
7 Geo. 4. c. 16	Chelsea and Kilmainham Hospitals Act 1826	In section 35, the words from " and in all indictments " (in the first place where they occur) onwards.
6 & 7 Will. 4. c. 116	Grand Jury (Ireland) Act 1836	Sections 169 and 170.
1 & 2 Vict. c. 28	Bread (Ireland) Act 1838	In section 13, the words from " of the city " to " shall be committed ".
1 & 2 Vict. c. 56	Poor Relief (Ireland) Act 1838	Sections 103 and 105.
3 & 4 Vict. c. 97	Railway Regulation Act 1840	In section 13, the words from " and in default " onwards. In section 16, the words from " and in default " onwards.
8 & 9 Vict. c. 16	Companies Clauses Consolidation Act 1845	In section 142, the words from " and if the amount " onwards. Section 150. In section 154, the words from " and on nonpayment " onwards. Section 155.
8 & 9 Vict. c. 18	Lands Clauses Consolidation Act 1845	Section 138.
8 & 9 Vict. c. 20	Railways Clauses Consolidation Act 1845	In section 140, the words from " and if the amount " onwards. Section 148. Section 153.
10 & 11 Vict. c. 16	Commissioners Clauses Act 1847	In section 64, the words from " and in every " onwards.
14 & 15 Vict. c. 92	Summary Jurisdiction (Ireland) Act 1851	Section 21. In section 25, the definition of " county surveyor ".
16 & 17 Vict. c. 119	Betting Act 1853	Sections 8 and 15.
17 & 18 Vict. c. 103	Towns Improvement (Ireland) Act 1854	In section 90, the words from " and if the sums adjudged " (in the first place where they occur) to " making the adjudication " (in the first place where they occur) and the words from " and if the sums adjudged " (in the second place where they occur) onwards. Section 91. Schedule (C).
1945 c. 15 (N.I.)	Criminal Justice Act (Northern Ireland) 1945	Section 30. In section 45(1), the definitions of " quarter sessions " and " statutory period ".
1967 c. 18 (N.I.)	Criminal Law Act (Northern Ireland) 1967	In Schedule 1, paragraph 5.
1968 c. 10 (N.I.)	Costs in Criminal Cases Act (Northern Ireland) 1968	In section 10(1), in the definition of " constable ", the words from " and includes " onwards.
1968 c. 29 (N.I.)	Treatment of Offenders Act (Northern Ireland) 1968	Section 13(6). Section 14(1) and (2).
1969 c. 15 (N.I.)	Grand Jury (Abolition) Act (Northern Ireland) 1969	Section 1(1) to (4).
1970 c. 4 (N.I.)	Public Order (Amendment) Act (Northern Ireland) 1970	In section 1(2), the words from the beginning to " and, accordingly, ". Section 2(2).
1971 c. 12 (N.I.)	Public Order (Amendment) Act (Northern Ireland) 1971	In section 1, the words from the beginning to " and, accordingly, ".

==== Part V: Dissolved Bodies ====
Part V — Dissolved Bodies
Citation	Short title	Extent of repeal
1970 c. 11 (N.I.)	Nurses and Midwives Act (Northern Ireland) 1970	Section 2(1).
SI 1972/1265 (N.I. 14)	Health and Personal Social Services (Northern Ireland) Order 1972	Articles 73(2) and 74.
SI 1973/601 (N.I. 9)	Fire Services (Northern Ireland) Order 1973	Article 4(5).
SI 1973/961 (N.I. 12)	Recreation and Youth Service (Northern Ireland) Order 1973	Article 8.
SI 1973/2161 (N.I. 24)	Ministries (Northern Ireland) Order 1973	Article 4.
SI 1974/2144 (N.I. 7)	Youth Employment Service (Northern Ireland) Order 1974	Article 3.

==== Part VI: Educational Endowments ====
Part VI — Educational Endowments
Citation	Short title	Extent of repeal
48 & 49 Vict. c. 78	Educational Endowments (Ireland) Act 1885	In section 1, the definitions of " The Lord Lieutenant in Council " and " The Commissioners ". Sections 4 and 5. In section 6, the words " the Commissioner shall have power to prepare drafts of ", " which schemes " and " as the Commissioners shall think fit ". In section 7, the words " to the Commissioners ". In section 8, in paragraph (1) the words " in the opinion of the Commissioners "; in paragraph (2) the words " in the opinion of the Commissioners " and " according to the average of such number of years as the Commissioners shall determine "; in paragraph (4) the words " by the Commissioners "; paragraph (5) and the words from " Subject to the foregoing " onwards. In section 9, the words " to the Commissioners " and the words from " The Commissioners, with " onwards. In section 11, the words " In framing " and " the Commissioners ". In section 12, the words " with the written consent of the Commissioners, or ". In section 13, the words " In framing ", " it " and " be the duty of the Commissioners ", the word " to " (in the third place where it occurs), the word " in " (before " every scheme ") and the word " they ". In section 14, the words " In framing ", " the Commissioners " and " as the Commissioners shall determine ". In section 16, the words " In ", " the Commissioners " and " to the Commissioners ". In section 18, the word " In " and the words " the Commissioners " (where they first occur). Sections 19 to 25 and 27. In section 28, the words from the beginning to " Act, and ". Sections 30 to 36 and 38.

==== Part VII: Elections ====
Part VII — Elections
Citation	Short title	Extent of repeal
1962 c. 14 (N.I.)	Electoral Law Act (Northern Ireland) 1962	Section 10. Section 11(8). Sections 12 and 13. Section 15(4). Section 21(2). In section 22(1), the words " other than the university constituency ". In Schedule 3, in Rule 1(1), proceeding 2. Schedule 4. In Schedule 9, in Rule 33(2), the words " or paragraph (2) of Rule 4 ". In Schedule 10, Forms 1 and 6 and 7 to 11.
1968 c. 20 (N.I.)	Electoral Law Act (Northern Ireland) 1968	Section 1. In section 3, the words from the beginning to " accordingly ". In section 4, in subsection (1), the words from " and shall not affect " onwards; and subsection (2). Section 5. Section 7(1) and (2). Section 8. Schedule 2, except the amendments of section 6(1) of the Electoral Law Act (Northern Ireland) 1962, the first amendment of section 29(1)(a) of that Act and the amendment of paragraph 22(2)(b) of Schedule 3 to that Act. Schedule 4.
1969 c. 26 (N.I.)	Electoral Law Act (Northern Ireland) 1969	In section 1, the words from the beginning to " accordingly ". Section 3. In section 5, the words from the beginning to " accordingly ". Section 6. Schedule 2.
1971 c. 4 (N.I.)	Electoral Law Act (Northern Ireland) 1971	Section 1. Section 2(1)(a), (b), (e) and (f). Sections 3 and 4. Section 5(3). The Schedule.
SI 1972/1264 (N.I. 13)	Electoral Law (Northern Ireland) Order 1972	In Article 3(1), the words from the beginning to " accordingly ". In Article 4, paragraphs (1) to (7), in paragraph (8), the words from the beginning to " and accordingly " and paragraphs (9) to (12). Article 18. Schedule 3.
SI 1973/740 (N.I. 11)	Electoral Law (Northern Ireland) Order 1973	The whole order.

==== Part VIII: Employment ====
Part VIII — Employment
Citation	Short title	Extent of repeal
40 & 41 Vict. c. 49	General Prisons (Ireland) Act 1877	The whole act, so far as unrepealed.
1949 c. 2 (N.I.)	Agriculture Act (Northern Ireland) 1949	Sections 33 to 37. Schedule 2.
1954 c. 35 (N.I.)	Statute Law Revision Act (Northern Ireland) 1954	In the Schedule, in Part I, the entries relating to the General Prisons (Ireland) Act.
1956 c. 4 (N.I.)	Malone and Whiteabbey Training Schools Act (Northern Ireland) 1956	Section 11.
1967 c. 13 (N.I.)	Ulster Folk Museum (Amendment) Act (Northern Ireland) 1967	Sections 5 and 6.
1968 c. 14 (N.I.)	Ulster College Act (Northern Ireland) 1968	Section 7(2). Section 11(4). In section 12(1), the definitions of " rebate " and " redundancy payment ".
1969 c. 13 (N.I.)	Fire Services Act (Northern Ireland) 1969	Section 16A. Section 16B(2) to (7).
1970 c. 11 (N.I.)	Nurses and Midwives Act (Northern Ireland) 1970	Section 3(1) and (2).
SI 1974/2144 (N.I. 7)	Youth Employment Service (Northern Ireland) Order 1974	Article 4(1) to (5) and (7).

==== Part IX: Expenses ====
Part IX — Expenses
Citation	Short title	Extent of repeal
12 & 13 Geo. 5. c. 12 (N.I.)	Live Stock Breeding Act (Northern Ireland) 1922	Section 11(1).
2 & 3 Geo. 6. c. 32 (N.I.)	Housing (Emergency Powers) Act (Northern Ireland) 1939	In section 3(2), the words from the beginning to " Parliament, and ".
4 & 5 Geo. 6. c. 9 (N.I.)	Prevention of Fraud (Investments) Act (Northern Ireland) 1940	In section 20, the words from the beginning to " Parliament; and ".
1945 c. 6 (N.I.)	Disabled Persons (Employment) Act (Northern Ireland) 1945	Section 5. Section 15(6). In section 18(2), the words from " and the expenses " onwards.
1946 c. 18 (N.I.)	Loans Guarantee and Borrowing Regulation Act (Northern Ireland) 1946	Section 5.
1950 c. 31 (N.I.)	Milk Act (Northern Ireland) 1950	Section 11.
1952 c. 3 (N.I.)	Development of Tourist Traffic (Amendment) Act (Northern Ireland) 1952	Section 11.
1952 c. 7 (N.I.)	Administrative and Financial Provisions Act (Northern Ireland) 1952	Section 9.
1953 c. 21 (N.I.)	Slaughter-houses Act (Northern Ireland) 1953	In section 10, the words from the beginning to " Parliament, and ".
1953 c. 33 (N.I.)	Control of Fertilisers Act (Northern Ireland) 1953	Section 6.
1956 c. 4 (N.I.)	Malone and Whiteabbey Training Schools Act (Northern Ireland) 1956	Section 13.
1956 c. 17 (N.I.)	Administrative and Financial Provisions Act (Northern Ireland) 1956	Section 14(2).
1957 c. 27 (N.I.)	Marketing of Eggs Act (Northern Ireland) 1957	In section 19(2), the words from " and all " onwards.
1960 c. 4 (N.I.)	Disabled Persons (Employment) Act (Northern Ireland) 1960	Section 5.
1967 c. 15 (N.I.)	Agriculture (Miscellaneous Provisions) Act (Northern Ireland) 1967	Section 18.
1968 c. 8 (N.I.)	Public Expenditure and Receipts Act (Northern Ireland) 1968	Section 4(2).
1971 c. 9 (N.I.)	Local Government (Boundaries) Act (Northern Ireland) 1971	Sections 5 and 6.
1971 c. 10 (N.I.)	Resettlement Services Act (Northern Ireland) 1971	Section 3.
1972 c. 3 (N.I.)	Housing on Farms Act (Northern Ireland) 1972	Section 10(2).
1972 c. 9 (N.I.)	Local Government Act (Northern Ireland) 1972	Section 144.
SI 1972/1264 (N.I. 13)	Electoral Law (Northern Ireland) Order 1972	Article 17.
SI 1972/1999 (N.I. 22)	Local Government &c. (Northern Ireland) Order 1972	Article 10(2).
SI 1973/1086 (N.I. 14)	Salaries (Comptroller and Auditor-General and Others) (Northern Ireland) Order 1973	Article 5.

==== Part X: Finance ====
Part X — Finance
Citation	Short title	Extent of repeal
8 & 9 Vict. c. 37	Bankers (Ireland) Act 1845	Section 9.
15 & 16 Geo. 5. c. 30 (N.I.)	Finance Act (Northern Ireland) 1925	Section 3.
18 & 19 Geo. 5. c. 15	Bankers (Northern Ireland) Act 1928	In section 1(1), the proviso.
1948 c. 15 (N.I.)	Finance Act (Northern Ireland) 1948	Section 5(1).
1949 c. 15 (N.I.)	Finance Act (Northern Ireland) 1949	Section 8(2). In Schedule 2, Part II.
1967 c. 16 (N.I.)	Capital Grants to Industry (Amendment) Act (Northern Ireland) 1967	The whole act.
1970 c. 21 (N.I.)	Finance Act (Northern Ireland) 1970	In Schedule 2, paragraphs 1(1) and (2) and 2(2).
SI 1973/414 (N.I. 5)	Financial Provisions (Northern Ireland) Order 1973	Article 5.
SI 1973/416 (N.I. 7)	Museums (Northern Ireland) Order 1973	Article 5.
SI 1975/1307 (N.I. 12)	Diseases of Animals (Amendment) (Northern Ireland) Order 1975	Article 7.

==== Part XI: Gaming ====
Part XI — Gaming
Citation	Short title	Extent of repeal
12 Geo. 2. c. 28	Gaming Act 1738	The whole act, so far as unrepealed.
13 Geo. 2. c. 19	Gaming Act 1739	The whole act.
13 Geo. 2. c. 8 (I)	Gaming Act (Ireland) 1739	Sections 5, 10, 14 and 15.

==== Part XII: Local Government ====
Part XII — Local Government
Citation	Short title	Extent of repeal
21 & 22 Geo. 3. c. 11 (I)	Habeas Corpus Act (Ireland) 1781	In section 8, the words " any common workhouse or ".
1 & 2 Vict. c. 56	Poor Relief (Ireland) Act 1838	Schedule 1.
8 Edw. 7. c. 24	Summary Jurisdiction (Ireland) Act 1908	In section 1(2), the words from " or the relieving officer " onwards. In section 2(2), the words from " or the relieving officer " onwards. Section 11.
1967 c. 34 (N.I.)	Housing Act (Northern Ireland) 1967	Section 19.
1971 c. 16 (N.I.)	Housing Act (Northern Ireland) 1971	Section 50.
1972 c. 9 (N.I.)	Local Government Act (Northern Ireland) 1972	Section 139. In Schedule 2, paragraph 1(4) and (5).
SI 1973/70 (N.I. 2)	Water and Sewerage Services (Northern Ireland) Order 1973	Article 59.
SI 1973/601 (N.I. 9)	Fire Services (Northern Ireland) Order 1973	Article 4(1)(a). Article 8(2). Articles 11 and 12. Schedule 2.

==== Part XIII: Property ====
Part XIII — Property
Citation	Short title	Extent of repeal
11 Geo. 4 & 1 Will. 4. c. 65	Infants' Property Act 1830	In section 2, the words " the East India Company, South Sea Company, or ". In section 12, the words " or a feme covert ", and " and for such feme covert, or any person on her behalf " and the words " or feme covert " (wherever occurring). In section 14, the words from " and as to leases " onwards. In section 21, the words from " if such renewal shall be made by a feme covert " to " for her benefit ". In section 31, the word " unmarried " and the words from " and every such surrender " onwards.
33 & 34 Vict. c. 46	Landlord and Tenant (Ireland) Act 1870	Part III. In the Schedule, the table for redemption of annuities or rent charges.
5 & 6 Geo. 6. c. 13 (N.I.)	Clogher Valley Railway and Roads Act (Northern Ireland) 1941	The whole act, so far as unrepealed.
1954 c. 1 (N.I.)	Inland Navigation Act (Northern Ireland) 1954	In section 1, in subsection (1) the words from " and the Lagan Navigation Company " onwards; in subsection (2), the words from " the Ministry shall " onwards and subsection (4). Section 10(1) and (2). Schedule 1.
1955 c. 19 (N.I.)	Finance (Miscellaneous Provisions) Act (Northern Ireland) 1955	Section 24.
1957 c. 23 (N.I.)	King George VI Memorial Youth Council Act (Northern Ireland) 1957	Section 3(1), (2) and (3)(b). Schedule 2.
1961 c. 13 (N.I.)	Museum Act (Northern Ireland) 1961	In section 4, subsections (2) and (3); in subsection (4), the words " After the execution of the vesting agreement " and " (other than sub-section (3) and the Second Schedule) " and subsection (5). Sections 5 and 7(1)(a). Schedule 2.
1967 c. 13 (N.I.)	Ulster Folk Museum (Amendment) Act (Northern Ireland) 1967	In section 1, subsections (2) and (3); in subsection (4), the words " After the execution of the vesting agreement " and " (other than subsection (3) and the Schedule) " and subsection (5). Section 2. The Schedule.
1968 c. 14 (N.I.)	Ulster College Act (Northern Ireland) 1968	Section 2(2) to (5). Section 3. Schedules 1 and 2.
1969 c. 37 (N.I.)	Belfast (Kinnegar Works) Act (Northern Ireland) 1969	The whole act.
1970 c. 15 (N.I.)	Magee University College Londonderry Act (Northern Ireland) 1970	In section 1(2), the words from " thereby " onwards. Schedules 1 and 2.
SI 1972/1263 (N.I. 12)	Education and Libraries (Northern Ireland) Order 1972	Article 97.
SI 1972/1265 (N.I. 14)	Health and Personal Social Services (Northern Ireland) Order 1972	Article 75(1) and (3). Article 79(1). Article 80(1). Article 81(1). Article 82(1).
SI 1973/416 (N.I. 7)	Museums (Northern Ireland) Order 1973	Article 7(2) and (4)(a).
SI 1973/601 (N.I. 9)	Fire Services (Northern Ireland) Order 1973	In Article 4(2), the words from the beginning to " as from the appointed day ".
SI 1974/2144 (N.I. 7)	Youth Employment Service (Northern Ireland) Order 1974	Article 6(1).
SI 1975/417 (N.I. 2)	Community Relations (Amendment) (Northern Ireland) Order 1975	Article 3(2).

==== Part XIV: Miscellaneous ====
Part XIV — Miscellaneous
Citation	Short title	Extent of repeal
10 Geo. 4. c. 7	Roman Catholic Relief Act 1829	Section 15. In section 16, the words from " to enable any persons " to " foundation ", the word " or " (before the words " to repeal, abrogate ") and the words from " Provided also, that nothing herein " onwards. Section 17. In section 18, the words " or the lord lieutenant of Ireland ", the word " United " and the words " and Ireland ".
21 & 22 Vict. c. 49	Jews Relief Act 1858	In section 4, the words from the beginning to " for the time being; and " and the words " or the Lord Lieutenant of Ireland ".
32 & 33 Vict. c. 42	Irish Church Act 1869	Sections 7, 8, 11, 12, 23 and 25 to 28. In section 30, the words from the beginning to " same body; and ". In section 34(1), the words " or any right to mines or quarries in any land " and " or right ". Sections 34(3) and (5), 35 to 37, 48 and 49. In section 52, the words " land or ". Sections 54 and 56 to 65.
34 & 35 Vict. c. 24	Irish Presbyterian Church Act 1871	Sections 4 to 8. In section 9, the words from the beginning to " been satisfied " and the word " thenceforth ". In section 10, the words from " subject " to " aforesaid ". In section 13, the words " notwithstanding the Statutes of Mortmain ". Section 32.
44 & 45 Vict. c. 71	Irish Church Act Amendment Act 1881	The whole act.
57 & 58 Vict. c. 10	Trustee Act 1893 Amendment Act 1894	The whole act, so far as unrepealed.
59 & 60 Vict. c. 54	Public Health (Ireland) Act 1896	Section 28. Section 33(2).
63 & 64 Vict. c. 63	Local Government (Ireland) Act 1900	The whole act, so far as unrepealed.
1 & 2 Geo. 5. c. 52	Rag Flock Act 1911	In section 1(2), the words from " and the Rules " onwards.
3 & 4 Geo. 5. c. 17	Fabrics (Misdescription) Act 1913	In section 2, the words from " and the Rules " onwards.
13 & 14 Geo. 5. c. 33 (N.I.)	Workmen's Compensation Act (Northern Ireland) 1923	The whole act, so far as unrepealed.
23 & 24 Geo. 5. c. 28 (N.I.)	Finance Act (Northern Ireland) 1933	Section 6(1).
2 & 3 Geo. 6. c. 35 (N.I.)	Agricultural Returns Act (Northern Ireland) 1939	Section 3(2) and (3).
1944 c. 14 (N.I.)	Ministries Act (Northern Ireland) 1944	Section 4(4).
1946 c. 5 (N.I.)	Summary Jurisdiction (Miscellaneous Provisions) Act (Northern Ireland) 1946	In section 3, subsection (3) and in subsection (4), the words from " and that Act " onwards.
1946 c. 18 (N.I.)	Loans Guarantee and Borrowing Regulation Act (Northern Ireland) 1946	Section 3(2).
1947 c. 8 (N.I.)	Small Dwellings Acquisition Act (Northern Ireland) 1947	Section 1(3).
1947 c. 24 (N.I.)	Safeguarding of Employment Act (Northern Ireland) 1947	Section 7(3).
1949 c. 2 (N.I.)	Agriculture Act (Northern Ireland) 1949	Section 39(4)(c).
1950 c. 11 (N.I.)	Civil Defence Act (Northern Ireland) 1950	Section 7(1)(b).
1952 c. 5 (N.I.)	Foyle Fisheries Act (Northern Ireland) 1952	In section 13(3), the words from " shall be printed " to " 1925, and ".
1964 c. 1 (N.I.)	Limitation Act (Northern Ireland) 1964	The whole act, so far as unrepealed.
1964 c. 11 (N.I.)	Industrial Advice and Enterprise Act (Northern Ireland) 1964	In section 1, the words " Subject to the provisions of this Part " and the words from " may make " onwards. Sections 2, 3, 5, 6, 7, 13(1)(a), 16(b)(i) and 19. In section 21, the definitions of " consultant " and " industrial advice grant ".
1967 c. 10 (N.I.)	Industrial Advice and Enterprise (Amendment) Act (Northern Ireland) 1967	The whole act.
1968 c. 12 (N.I.)	Poultry Improvement Act (Northern Ireland) 1968	Section 15(2) and (3).
1968 c. 31 (N.I.)	Fisheries (Amendment) Act (Northern Ireland) 1968	Section 1(2). In section 5, in each of subsections (2) to (7) and (9) and (10), the words from the beginning to " and accordingly ". In section 6(1), the words from the beginning to " and accordingly ". Section 9(2). Schedule 3.
1968 c. 34 (N.I.)	Children and Young Persons Act (Northern Ireland) 1968	Section 38(3) and (4).
1969 c. 19 (N.I.)	National Insurance &c. (No. 2) Act (Northern Ireland) 1969	The whole act, so far as unrepealed.
1970 c. 11 (N.I.)	Nurses and Midwives Act (Northern Ireland) 1970	In Schedule 1, in paragraph 1, in sub-paragraph (1)(b), the words from " in the first instance " to " thereafter ", in sub-paragraph (3), the word " first " and the words " shall hold office for a term of five years and those thereafter appointed ", sub-paragraph (4), in sub-paragraph (5), the words from the beginning to " thereafter " and in sub-paragraph (7), the words from " first appointed " to " thereafter appointed ".
1970 c. 15 (N.I.)	Magee University College Londonderry Act (Northern Ireland) 1970	Section 4(1) and (2)(a). Section 5.
1970 c. 23 (N.I.)	Industrial Advice (Amendment) Act (Northern Ireland) 1970	In section 1, in subsection (1) the words " Parts I and III of " and the words from " shall be " onwards; subsection (2); in subsection (3) the words from " and the " to " 1967 " and the words from " (which " onwards and subsection (4). Sections 2 and 3(2). The Schedule, except the amendment of section 15(1) of, and paragraph (c) of the amendment of section 21 of, the Industrial Advice and Enterprise Act (Northern Ireland) 1964.
SI 1973/69 (N.I. 1)	Drainage (Northern Ireland) Order 1973	Article 3(2) and (3).
SI 1973/600 (N.I. 8)	Births, Deaths and Marriages Registration (Northern Ireland) Order 1973	Article 9. Article 10(2) to (5). Schedule 3.

== Subsequent developments ==
The whole act was repealed by section 1(1) of, and group 1 of part IX of schedule 1 to, the Statute Law (Repeals) Act 1998, which came into force on 19 November 1998.

== See also ==
- Statute Law Revision Act

== Bibliography ==
- HL Deb vol 406, cols 12 to 13, vol 410, cols 1601 to 1602, HC Deb vol 991, cols 862 to 868
