= List of acts of the Parliament of Northern Ireland from 1971 =

This is a list of acts of the Parliament of Northern Ireland from 1971.

From 1922 onwards, the short titles for these acts were distinguished from those passed by the Westminster parliament by the insertion of the bracketed words "Northern Ireland" between the word "act" and the year. Thus the Police Act (Northern Ireland) 1970 was an act passed by the Parliament of Northern Ireland, whereas the Police (Northern Ireland) Act 1998 was passed at Westminster.

As with UK legislation, Northern Ireland's acts of Parliament were traditionally cited using the regnal year(s) of the parliamentary session in which they became law, though in 1954 this was retrospectively changed to calendar years beginning with 1943. Note that by convention "(N.I.)" is also added after the chapter number so as to avoid confusion with Westminster legislation.

== 1971 ==
=== Public acts ===
Short title, or popular name	Citation	Royal assent
Long title
Health Services Act (Northern Ireland) 1971 (repealed)	1971 c. 1 (N.I.)	16 February 1971
(Repealed by Health and Personal Social Services (Northern Ireland) Order 1972 (SI 1972/1265)
Welfare Services Act (Northern Ireland) 1971	1971 c. 2 (N.I.)	16 February 1971
An Act to consolidate certain enactments relating to welfare services.
Statistics of Trade (Amendment) Act (Northern Ireland) 1971	1971 c. 3 (N.I.)	16 February 1971
Electoral Law Act (Northern Ireland) 1971	1971 c. 4 (N.I.)	25 February 1971
An Act to advance the date for the extension of the local government franchise; to provide for annual registers of parliamentary and local electors; to postpone triennial elections for local authorities; and to alter the method of filling casual vacancies in local authorities other than county boroughs and boroughs; and for purposes connected with those matters or any of them.
Housing Executive Act (Northern Ireland) 1971	1971 c. 5 (N.I.)	25 February 1971
An Act to establish a Northern Ireland Housing Executive and Northern Ireland Housing Council, and to make further provisions with respect to housing.
Financial Provisions Act (Northern Ireland) 1971	1971 c. 6 (N.I.)	18 March 1971
An Act to increase the limits on sums which may be issued out of the Consolidated Fund for certain purposes, on outstanding Government loans, on sums payable in grants for hotels, guest houses and boarding houses and on sums payable to the Trustees of the Ulster Folk Museum; (Note: Ulster Folk Museum.) to establish an Exchequer Accrued Interest Fund; to amend certain provisions of the Government Loans Act (Northern Ireland) 1957; (Note: Government Loans Act (Northern Ireland) 1957 (c. 10 (N.I.))) to withdraw the payments additional to refund of selective employment tax which are made under section 1(1)(a) to (d) of the Selective Employment Payments Act (Northern Ireland) 1966; (Note: Selective Employment Payments Act (Northern Ireland) 1966 (c. 32 (N.I.))) and for purposes connected with those matters.
Leasehold (Enlargement and Extension) Act (Northern Ireland) 1971	1971 c. 7 (N.I.)	18 March 1971
An Act to enable lessees of certain premises held on long leases to purchase the fee simple interest in the land, to enable grantees of certain fee farm grants to redeem their fee farm rents, to enable such lessees to obtain an extension of their leases, and for matters connected with those matters.
Family Income Supplements Act (Northern Ireland) 1971	1971 c. 8 (N.I.)	23 March 1971
Local Government (Boundaries) Act (Northern Ireland) 1971 (repealed)	1971 c. 9 (N.I.)	23 March 1971
An Act to provide that Northern Ireland shall be divided into twenty-six local government districts and that each of those districts shall be divided into wards; to appoint a Commissioner to make recommendations regarding the boundaries and names of those districts and wards and the number of wards in each district; and for purposes connected therewith. (Repealed by Local Government (Boundaries) Act (Northern Ireland) 2008 (c. 7 (N.I.)))
Resettlement Services Act (Northern Ireland) 1971	1971 c. 10 (N.I.)	23 March 1971
An Act to enable the provision of services and assistance for purposes of resettlement.
Consolidated Fund Act (Northern Ireland) 1971	1971 c. 11 (N.I.)	25 March 1971
Public Order (Amendment) Act (Northern Ireland) 1971 (repealed)	1971 c. 12 (N.I.)	1 April 1971
(Repealed by Public Order (Northern Ireland) Order 1981 (SI 1981/609))
Licensing Act (Northern Ireland) 1971 (repealed)	1971 c. 13 (N.I.)	27 April 1971
(Repealed by Licensing (Northern Ireland) Order 1990 (SI 1990/594))
Transport (Amendment) Act (Northern Ireland) 1971	1971 c. 14 (N.I.)	20 May 1971
An Act to authorise the payment of grants to the Northern Ireland Transport Holding Company to enable it to discharge its obligations to pay pensions and compensation to former employees of the Ulster Transport Authority; to enable further provision to be made for securing the future payment of pensions to such employees; and to provide for the charging of loans and liabilities under guarantees on the undertaking and revenues of the Holding Company.
Aerodromes Act (Northern Ireland) 1971 (repealed)	1971 c. 15 (N.I.)	20 May 1971
(Repealed by Airports (Northern Ireland) Order 1994 (SI 1994/426)
Housing Act (Northern Ireland) 1971	1971 c. 16 (N.I.)	8 June 1971
Historic Monuments Act (Northern Ireland) 1971 (repealed)	1971 c. 17 (N.I.)	8 June 1971
(Repealed by Historic Monuments and Archaeological Objects (Northern Ireland) Order 1995 (SI 1995/1625)
Indecent Advertisements (Amendment) Act (Northern Ireland) 1971	1971 c. 18 (N.I.)	8 June 1971
An Act to amend the Indecent Advertisements Act 1889. (Note: Indecent Advertisements Act 1889 (52 & 53 Vict. c. 18))
Gas Act (Northern Ireland) 1971	1971 c. 19 (N.I.)	8 June 1971
Education (Amendment) Act (Northern Ireland) 1971 (repealed)	1971 c. 20 (N.I.)	8 June 1971
(Repealed by Education and Libraries (Northern Ireland) Order 1972 (SI 1972/1263)
Social Services (Parity) Act (Northern Ireland) 1971	1971 c. 21 (N.I.)	8 June 1971
An Act to make provision for maintaining certain social services generally in parity with Great Britain and for connected purposes.
Industries Development Act (Northern Ireland) 1971	1971 c. 22 (N.I.)	15 June 1971
Planning and Land Compensation Act (Northern Ireland) 1971	1971 c. 23 (N.I.)	15 June 1971
An Act to make further provision in relation to the acquisition of land by public authorities in certain circumstances and as to the assumptions to be made in assessing compensation for the compulsory acquisition of land; to amend the Planning Acts (Northern Ireland) 1944 (Note: Planning (Interim Development) Act (Northern Ireland) 1944 (c. 3 (N.I.))) and 1965 (Note: Land Development Values (Compensation) Act (Northern Ireland) 1965 (c. 23 (N.I.))) and to make other provision with respect to planning matters.
Proceedings Against Estates Act (Northern Ireland) 1971	1971 c. 24 (N.I.)	15 June 1971
Firearms (Amendment) Act (Northern Ireland) 1971	1971 c. 25 (N.I.)	15 June 1971
Appropriation Act (Northern Ireland) 1971	1971 c. 26 (N.I.)	15 June 1971
Finance Act (Northern Ireland) 1971	1971 c. 27 (N.I.)	15 June 1971
An Act to amend the law relating to estate duty, stamp duties and certain duties of excise (including excise duties on mechanically-propelled vehicles and gaming machine licences); to confirm and give effect to an agreement between the Ministry of Finance and the Treasury of the United Kingdom relating to health services; and to make further provision in connection with finance.
Social Security Act (Northern Ireland) 1971	1971 c. 28 (N.I.)	17 August 1971
Local Bodies (Emergency Powers) Act (Northern Ireland) 1971	1971 c. 29 (N.I.)	12 October 1971
Payments for Debt (Emergency Provisions) Act (Northern Ireland) 1971	1971 c. 30 (N.I.)	14 October 1971
Administration of Estates Act (Northern Ireland) 1971	1971 c. 31 (N.I.)	7 December 1971
An Act to amend the law with respect to the grant of administration by the High Court and resealing by that Court of administration granted outside the United Kingdom and to exempt from stamp duty guarantees given under the law so amended; to make provision with respect to the duties and rights of personal representatives; to amend the law relating to the protection of persons acting on probate or administration; and for related purposes.
Nursing Homes and Nursing Agencies Act (Northern Ireland) 1971	1971 c. 32 (N.I.)	7 December 1971
Powers of Attorney Act (Northern Ireland) 1971	1971 c. 33 (N.I.)	7 December 1971
An Act to make new provision in relation to powers of attorney and the delegation by trustees of their trusts, powers and discretions.
Industrial Investment (Amendment) Act (Northern Ireland) 1971	1971 c. 34 (N.I.)	7 December 1971
Pensions (Increase) Act (Northern Ireland) 1971	1971 c. 35 (N.I.)	7 December 1971
An Act to replace the Pensions (Increase) Acts (Northern Ireland) 1920 to 1969 and make further provision for increases to be paid on certain pensions and related benefits.
Civil Evidence Act (Northern Ireland) 1971	1971 c. 36 (N.I.)	16 December 1971
An Act to amend the law of evidence in relation to civil proceedings, and in respect of the privilege against self-incrimination to make corresponding amendments in relation to statutory powers of inspection or investigation.
Criminal Procedure (Majority Verdicts) Act (Northern Ireland) 1971	1971 c. 37 (N.I.)	16 December 1971
An Act to enable juries in criminal proceedings to reach a verdict by a majority of their members.
Criminal Injuries to Property (Compensation) Act (Northern Ireland) 1971	1971 c. 38 (N.I.)	16 December 1971
Appropriation (No. 2) Act (Northern Ireland) 1971	1971 c. 39 (N.I.)	16 December 1971

=== Local acts ===
Short title, or popular name	Citation	Royal assent
Long title
Allied Irish Banks Act (Northern Ireland) 1971	1971 c. i (N.I.)	8 July 1971

== See also ==
- List of acts of the Northern Ireland Assembly
- List of orders in Council for Northern Ireland

== Sources ==
- The Statute Law Database has the revised statutes of Northern Ireland (incorporating changes made by legislation up to 31 December 2005) and the acts made since that date.
- The Belfast Gazette: Archive
