= List of acts of the Parliament of Northern Ireland from 1970 =

This is a list of acts of the Parliament of Northern Ireland from 1970.

The short titles for these acts were distinguished from those passed by the Westminster parliament by the insertion of the bracketed words "Northern Ireland" between the word "act" and the year. Thus the Police Act (Northern Ireland) 1970 was an act passed by the Parliament of Northern Ireland, whereas the Police (Northern Ireland) Act 1998 was passed at Westminster.

Note that by convention "(N.I.)" is also added after the chapter number so as to avoid confusion with Westminster legislation.

== 1970 ==
=== Public acts ===
Short title, or popular name	Citation	Royal assent
Long title
Harbours Act (Northern Ireland) 1970	1970 c. 1 (N.I.)	5 February 1970
An Act to make further provision with respect to harbours.
Road Traffic Act (Northern Ireland) 1970	1970 c. 2 (N.I.)	5 February 1970
Egg Packing Industry (Reorganisation) Act (Northern Ireland) 1970	1970 c. 3 (N.I.)	5 February 1970
Public Order (Amendment) Act (Northern Ireland) 1970	1970 c. 4 (N.I.)	5 February 1970
An Act to make further provision for the maintenance of public order and the prevention of disturbance of lawful public processions and public meetings; to prohibit the wearing of uniforms in connection with political objects and the maintenance by private persons of associations of a military or similar character; to prohibit the carrying of offensive weapons in public places without lawful authority or reasonable excuse; and for purposes connected with those matters.
Valuation (Amendment) Act (Northern Ireland) 1970	1970 c. 5 (N.I.)	5 February 1970
Education (Examinations) Act (Northern Ireland) 1970 (repealed)	1970 c. 6 (N.I.)	5 February 1970
(Repealed by Education and Libraries (Northern Ireland) Order 1972 (SI 1972/1263)
Lough Neagh Drainage (Amendment) Act (Northern Ireland) 1970	1970 c. 7 (N.I.)	5 February 1970
An Act to make further provision with respect to the levels of Lough Neagh.
Consolidated Fund Act (Northern Ireland) 1970	1970 c. 8 (N.I.)	24 March 1970
Police Act (Northern Ireland) 1970 (repealed)	1970 c. 9 (N.I.)	26 March 1970
An Act to provide for the establishment and functions of a Police Authority for Northern Ireland, of a Police Association for Northern Ireland and of a Police Advisory Board for Northern Ireland; to make provision in connection with the giving of assistance to the police force in Northern Ireland by other United Kingdom police forces; to enable assistance to be given to other United Kingdom police forces by the police force in Northern Ireland; to make provision in relation to a Police Council for the United Kingdom; to make further or other provision in relation to the police force in Northern Ireland; and for purposes connected with any of those matters. (Repealed by Police (Northern Ireland) Act 1998 (c. 32)
Explosives Act (Northern Ireland) 1970	1970 c. 10 (N.I.)	19 May 1970
An Act to make further provision with respect to the regulation of explosives and fireworks and for related purposes.
Nurses and Midwives Act (Northern Ireland) 1970	1970 c. 11 (N.I.)	19 May 1970
Payment of Wages Act (Northern Ireland) 1970 (repealed)	1970 c. 12 (N.I.)	19 May 1970
(Repealed by Wages (Northern Ireland) Order 1988 (SI 1988/796))
Social Need (Grants) Act (Northern Ireland) 1970	1970 c. 13 (N.I.)	9 June 1970
Transport (Aerodromes) Act (Northern Ireland) 1970	1970 c. 14 (N.I.)	9 June 1970
Magee University College Londonderry Act (Northern Ireland) 1970	1970 c. 15 (N.I.)	9 June 1970
An Act to provide for the transfer of certain property from the Trustees of Magee University College Londonderry to the New University of Ulster, and for the amount payable in respect of that transfer; to enable those Trustees to deal with the contents of the buildings so transferred; to set out the duties of those Trustees, and to confer jurisdiction on the High Court to deal with certain property; to authorise the making of regulations for compensation, in certain circumstances, for members of the academic staff and other employees of that College; to give that University the option to purchase the premises of the Magee Theological College Londonderry; to authorise those Trustees to convey the Peace Thanksgiving Hostel, and to transfer the Peace Thanksgiving Fund, to the Trustees of the Presbyterian Church in Ireland; and for purposes connected therewith.
Maintenance and Affiliation Orders Act (Northern Ireland) 1970	1970 c. 16 (N.I.)	23 June 1970
An Act to remove limits on maintenance orders in courts of summary jurisdiction; to extend the time limit for complaints on the ground of adultery; and to provide for the return of certain moneys paid to collecting officers.
Health Service Contributions Act (Northern Ireland) 1970 (repealed)	1970 c. 17 (N.I.)	23 June 1970
(Repealed by Social Security Act 1973 (c. 38))
Land Registration Act (Northern Ireland) 1970	1970 c. 18 (N.I.)	23 June 1970
An Act to revise the law relating to the registration of the title to land; to extend the compulsory registration of the title to land; to repeal and re-enact with certain amendments the law relating to the registration of statutory charges; and for matters connected therewith.
Industrial Investment (Amendment) Act (Northern Ireland) 1970	1970 c. 19 (N.I.)	9 July 1970
Agriculture (Miscellaneous Provisions) Act (Northern Ireland) 1970	1970 c. 20 (N.I.)	9 July 1970
An Act to enable provision to be made for agricultural training; to amend or repeal certain enactments relating to noxious weeds, diseases of bees and animals, agricultural marketing, seeds and loans for agricultural and fishery development; to make further provision in connection with the dehorning of cattle; and for purposes connected with the matters aforesaid.
Finance Act (Northern Ireland) 1970	1970 c. 21 (N.I.)	9 July 1970
An Act to amend the law relating to estate duty, stamp duties and certain duties of excise (including excise duties on mechanically-propelled vehicles, general betting, bookmaking office licences and gaming machine licences); to make further provision with respect to payments under the Selective Employment Payments Act (Northern Ireland) 1966; (Note: Selective Employment Payments Act (Northern Ireland) 1966 (c. 32 (N.I.))) and to make further provision in connection with finance.
Criminal Justice (Temporary Provisions) Act (Northern Ireland) 1970 (repealed)	1970 c. 22 (N.I.)	1 July 1970
An Act to provide for the imposition of minimum sentences of imprisonment on persons convicted of certain offences committed during the period of the present emergency; and for related purposes. (Repealed by Northern Ireland (Emergency Provisions) Act 1973 (c. 53)
Industrial Advice (Amendment) Act (Northern Ireland) 1970	1970 c. 23 (N.I.)	9 July 1970
Prevention of Incitement to Hatred Act (Northern Ireland) 1970 (repealed)	1970 c. 24 (N.I.)	2 July 1970
An Act to impose penalties for incitement to hatred and for the circulation of certain false statements or false reports; and for purposes connected therewith. (Repealed by Public Order (Northern Ireland) Order 1981 (SI 1981/609))
Registration of Deeds Act (Northern Ireland) 1970	1970 c. 25 (N.I.)	9 July 1970
An Act to consolidate certain enactments relating to the registration of documents in the Registry of Deeds.
Criminal Injuries (Amendment) Act (Northern Ireland) 1970	1970 c. 26 (N.I.)	9 July 1970
Appropriation Act (Northern Ireland) 1970	1970 c. 27 (N.I.)	9 July 1970
National Insurance Act (Northern Ireland) 1970 or the National Insurance (Old Persons' and Widows' Pensions and Attendance Allowance) Act (Northern Ireland) 1970 (repealed)	1970 c. 28 (N.I.)	3 November 1970
(Repealed by Social Security Act 1973 (c. 38))
Electricity (Borrowing Powers) Act (Northern Ireland) 1970 (repealed)	1970 c. 29 (N.I.)	13 November 1970
(Repealed by Electricity Supply (Northern Ireland) Order 1972 (SI 1972/1072)
Printed Documents Act (Northern Ireland) 1970	1970 c. 30 (N.I.)	17 December 1970
An Act to make provision for obtaining information with respect to the printing of certain documents and for related purposes.
Friendly Societies Act (Northern Ireland) 1970	1970 c. 31 (N.I.)	17 December 1970
Equal Pay Act (Northern Ireland) 1970	1970 c. 32 (N.I.)	17 December 1970
An Act to prevent discrimination, as regards terms and conditions of employment, between men and women.
Criminal Justice (Temporary Provisions) (Amendment) Act (Northern Ireland) 1970 (repealed)	1970 c. 33 (N.I.)	17 December 1970
(Repealed by Northern Ireland (Emergency Provisions) Act 1973 (c. 53)

=== Local acts ===
Short title, or popular name	Citation	Royal assent
Long title
Londonderry Corporation Act (Northern Ireland) 1970	1970 c. i (N.I.)	5 February 1970
Northern Bank Act (Northern Ireland) 1970	1970 c. ii (N.I.)	9 June 1970

== See also ==
- List of acts of the Parliament of Northern Ireland
- List of acts of the Northern Ireland Assembly
- List of orders in Council for Northern Ireland

== Sources ==
- The Statute Law Database has the revised statutes of Northern Ireland (incorporating changes made by legislation up to 31 December 2005) and the Acts made since that date.
- The Belfast Gazette: Archive
