= List of acts of the Parliament of Northern Ireland from 1972 =

This is a list of acts of the Parliament of Northern Ireland from 1972.

From 1922 onwards, the short titles for acts of the Parliament of Northern Ireland were distinguished from those passed by the Westminster parliament by the insertion of the bracketed words "Northern Ireland" between the word "act" and the year. Thus the Police Act (Northern Ireland) 1970 was an act passed by the Parliament of Northern Ireland, whereas the Police (Northern Ireland) Act 1998 was passed at Westminster.

As with UK legislation, Northern Ireland's acts of Parliament were traditionally cited using the regnal year(s) of the parliamentary session in which they became law, though in 1954 this was retrospectively changed to calendar years beginning with 1943. Note that by convention "(N.I.)" is also added after the chapter number so as to avoid confusion with Westminster legislation.

== 1972 ==
=== Public acts ===
Short title, or popular name	Citation	Royal assent
Long title
Road Races (Amendment) Act (Northern Ireland) 1972 (repealed)	1972 c. 1 (N.I.)	
(Repealed by Road Races (Northern Ireland) Order 1977 (SI 1977/2155)
Public Utilities (Emergency Powers) Act (Northern Ireland) 1972	1972 c. 2 (N.I.)	8 February 1972
An Act to confer powers on certain undertakers to enter upon, and to carry out works on, land in cases of emergency; and for purposes connected therewith.
Housing on Farms Act (Northern Ireland) 1972	1972 c. 3 (N.I.)	8 February 1972
An Act to consolidate the Housing on Farms Act (Northern Ireland) 1950 (Note: Housing on Farms Act (Northern Ireland) 1950 (c. 21 (N.I.))) and certain other enactments.
Fish Industry Act (Northern Ireland) 1972	1972 c. 4 (N.I.)	22 February 1972
An Act to make provision for financial aid towards expenditure for purposes of the fish industry, to enable the investment of public money in the fish industry and for purposes connected therewith.
Water Act (Northern Ireland) 1972 (repealed)	1972 c. 5 (N.I.)	22 February 1972
(Repealed by Water (Northern Ireland) Order 1999 (SI 1999/662))
Evidence of Alibi Act (Northern Ireland) 1972	1972 c. 6 (N.I.)	22 February 1972
An Act to amend the law relating to the giving in criminal proceedings of evidence in support of alibis; and for connected purposes.
Welfare of Animals Act (Northern Ireland) 1972 (repealed)	1972 c. 7 (N.I.)	23 March 1972
An Act to make provision with respect to the welfare of livestock on agricultural land; to regulate the keeping of petshops, animal boarding, riding and zoological establishments; and to consolidate with amendments certain enactments relating to the protection of animals from unnecessary suffering and for purposes connected therewith. (Repealed by Welfare of Animals Act (Northern Ireland) 2011 (c. 16 (N.I.))
Rating and Valuation Act (Northern Ireland) 1972	1972 c. 8 (N.I.)	23 March 1972
Local Government Act (Northern Ireland) 1972	1972 c. 9 (N.I.)	23 March 1972
An Act to provide for the constitution of district councils to administer local government districts, for the regulation of such councils and for certain of their functions; to abolish existing local government areas and existing local authorities, with certain exceptions, and to enable provision to be made for the transfer of the functions, assets and liabilities of such authorities; and for connected purposes.
Vehicles (Excise) Act (Northern Ireland) 1972	1972 c. 10 (N.I.)	28 March 1972
Miscellaneous Transferred Excise Duties Act (Northern Ireland) 1972 (repealed)	1972 c. 11 (N.I.)	23 March 1972
An Act to consolidate various enactments relating to certain transferred excise duties and for purposes connected therewith. Repealed by Wildlife and Natural Environment Act (Northern Ireland) 2011 (c. 15 (N.I.))
Commission on Sales of Land Act (Northern Ireland) 1972	1972 c. 12 (N.I.)	23 March 1972
National Insurance Regulations (Validation) Act (Northern Ireland) 1972 (repealed)	1972 c. 13 (N.I.)	28 March 1972
(Repealed by Social Security Act 1973 (c. 38))
Consolidated Fund Act (Northern Ireland) 1972	1972 c. 14 (N.I.)	23 March 1972
Agriculture (Abolition of County Committees) Act (Northern Ireland) 1972	1972 c. 15 (N.I.)	28 March 1972
An Act to provide for the abolition of county committees of agriculture established under the Agriculture Act (Northern Ireland) 1949, and for purposes connected therewith.

The Parliament of Northern Ireland was dissolved on 28 March 1972, and abolished on 30 March 1972.

== See also ==
- List of acts of the Northern Ireland Assembly
- List of orders in Council for Northern Ireland

== Sources ==
- The Statute Law Database has the revised statutes of Northern Ireland (incorporating changes made by legislation up to 31 December 2005) and the Acts made since that date.
- The Belfast Gazette: Archive
