= List of orders in Council for Northern Ireland =

This is a list of orders in Council for Northern Ireland which are primary legislation for the region in the absence of a devolved legislature, and also for those powers not devolved to the Northern Ireland Assembly. The statutory instruments containing the legislation are numbered in the main UK series (SI number) with a sub-series ((N.I. number) denoting their position in the Northern Ireland legislation for the year.

== 1972–1979 ==
=== 1972 ===
Title	Citation	Date made
Prosecution of Offences (Northern Ireland) Order 1972	SI 1972/538 (N.I. 1)	30 March 1972
Appropriation (Northern Ireland) Order 1972	SI 1972/671 (N.I. 2)	28 April 1972
Explosives (Northern Ireland) Order 1972	SI 1972/730 (N.I. 3)	11 May 1972
Northern Ireland Finance Corporation (Northern Ireland) Order 1972	SI 1972/731 (N.I. 4)	11 May 1972
County Courts (Additional Sittings) (Northern Ireland) Order 1972	SI 1972/965 (N.I. 5)	28 June 1972
Employer's Liability (Defective Equipment and Compulsory Insurance) (Northern Ireland) Order 1972	SI 1972/963 (N.I. 6)	28 June 1972
Exported Animals (Compensation) (Northern Ireland) Order 1972	SI 1972/964 (N.I. 7)	28 June 1972
Appropriation (No. 2) (Northern Ireland) Order 1972	SI 1972/1071 (N.I. 8)	19 July 1972
Electricity Supply (Northern Ireland) Order 1972	SI 1972/1072 (N.I. 9)	19 July 1972
Superannuation (Northern Ireland) Order 1972	SI 1972/1073 (N.I. 10)	19 July 1972
Finance (Northern Ireland) Order 1972	SI 1972/1100 (N.I. 11)	26 July 1972
Education and Libraries (Northern Ireland) Order 1972	SI 1972/1263 (N.I. 12)	26 July 1972
Electoral Law (Northern Ireland) Order 1972	SI 1972/1264 (N.I. 13)	14 August 1972
Health and Personal Social Services (Northern Ireland) Order 1972	SI 1972/1265 (N.I. 14)	14 August 1972
Detention of Terrorists (Northern Ireland) Order 1972	SI 1972/1632 (N.I. 15)	1 November 1972
Rates (Northern Ireland) Order 1972	SI 1972/1633 (N.I. 16)	1 November 1972
Planning (Northern Ireland) Order 1972	SI 1972/1634 (N.I. 17)	1 November 1972
Appropriation (No. 3) (Northern Ireland) Order 1972	SI 1972/1812 (N.I. 18)	28 November 1972
Building Regulations (Northern Ireland) Order 1972	SI 1972/1996 (N.I. 19)	20 December 1972
Development of Tourist Traffic (Northern Ireland) Order 1972	SI 1972/1997 (N.I. 20)	20 December 1972
Local Government (Postponement of Elections and Reorganisation) (Northern Ireland) Order 1972	SI 1972/1998 (N.I. 21)	20 December 1972
Local Government &c. (Northern Ireland) Order 1972	SI 1972/1999 (N.I. 22)	20 December 1972

=== 1973 ===
Title	Citation	Date made
Drainage (Northern Ireland) Order 1973	SI 1973/69 (N.I. 1)	19 January 1973
Water and Sewerage Services (Northern Ireland) Order 1973	SI 1973/70 (N.I. 2	19 January 1973
Northern Ireland (Border Poll) Order 1973	SI 1973/97 (N.I. 3)	24 January 1973
Appropriation (Northern Ireland) Order 1973	SI 1973/414 (N.I. 4)	8 March 1973
Financial Provisions (Northern Ireland) Order 1973	SI 1973/414 (N.I. 5)	8 March 1973
Firearms (Amendment) (Northern Ireland) Order 1973	SI 1973/415 (N.I. 6)	8 March 1973
Museums (Northern Ireland) Order 1973	SI 1973/416 (N.I. 7)	8 March 1973
Births, Deaths and Marriages Registration (Northern Ireland) Order 1973	SI 1973/600 (N.I. 8)	29 March 1973
Fire Services (Northern Ireland) Order 1973	SI 1973/601 (N.I. 9)	12 March 1973
Oaths and Declarations (Repeals) (Northern Ireland) Order 1973	SI 1973/603 (N.I. 10)	29 March 1973
Electoral Law (Northern Ireland) Order 1973	SI 1973/740 (N.I. 11)	13 April 1973
Recreation and Youth Service (Northern Ireland) Order 1973	SI 1973/961 (N.I. 12)	24 May 1973
Superannuation (Northern Ireland) Order 1973	SI 1973/962 (N.I. 13)	24 May 1973
Salaries (Comptroller and Auditor-General and Others) (Northern Ireland) Order 1973	SI 1973/1086 (N.I. 14)	20 June 1973
Appropriation (No. 2) (Northern Ireland) Order 1973	SI 1973/1228 (N.I. 16)	16 July 1973
Enterprise Ulster (Northern Ireland) Order 1973	SI 1973/1228 (N.I. 16)	16 July 1973
Road Traffic (Amendment) (Northern Ireland) Order 1973	SI 1973/1323 (N.I. 18)	25 July 197
Finance (Miscellaneous Provisions) (Northern Ireland) Order 1973	SI 1973/1323 (N.I. 18)	25 July 1973
Mr. Speaker Neill's Retirement (Northern Ireland) Order 1973	SI 1973/1323 (N.I. 18)	27 July 1973
Pig Production Development (Amendment) (Northern Ireland) Order 1973	SI 1973/1322 (N.I. 20)	27 July 1974
Land Acquisition and Compensation (Northern Ireland) Order 1973	SI 1973/1896 (N.I. 21)	13 November 1974
Appropriation (No. 3) (Northern Ireland) Order 1973	1973 (N.I. 23)	12 December 1973
Ministries (Northern Ireland) Order 1973	SI 1973/2161 (N.I. 24)	19 December 1973

=== 1974 ===
Title	Citation	Date made
Appropriation (Northern Ireland) Order 1974	SI 1974/1266 (N.I. 1)	25 July 1974
Pensions (Increase) (Northern Ireland) Order 1974	SI 1974/1267 (N.I. 2)	25 July 1974
Social Security (Consequences of Emergency) (Northern Ireland) Order 1974	SI 1974/1268 (N.I. 3)	25 July 1974
Financial Provisions (Northern Ireland) Order 1974	SI 1974/2141 (N.I. 4)	18 December 1974
Appropriation (No. 2) (Northern Ireland) Order 1974	SI 1974/2142 (N.I. 5)	18 December 1974
Juries (Northern Ireland) Order 1974	SI 1974/2143 (N.I. 6)	18 December 1974
Youth Employment Service (Northern Ireland) Order 1974	SI 1974/2144 (N.I. 7)	18 December 1974

=== 1975 ===
Title	Citation	Date made
Appropriation (Northern Ireland) Order 1975	SI 1975/416 (N.I. 1)	18 March 1975
Community Relations (Amendment) (Northern Ireland) Order 1975	SI 1975/417 (N.I. 2)	18 March 1975
Diseases of Animals (Northern Ireland) Order 1975	SI 1975/418 (N.I. 3)	18 March 1975
Selective Employment Premium (Northern Ireland) Order 1975	SI 1975/424 (N.I. 4	18 March 1975
Shipbuilding Industry (Northern Ireland) Order 1975	SI 1975/814 (N.I. 5)	14 May 1975
Recreation (Northern Ireland) Order 1975	SI 1975/424 (N.I. 6)	14 May 1975
Administration of Justice (Northern Ireland) Order 1975	SI 1975/816 (N.I. 7)	14 May 1975
Agriculture (Miscellaneous Provisions) (Northern Ireland) Order 1975	SI 1975/1038 (N.I. 8)	25 June 1975
Defective Premises (Northern Ireland) Order 1975	SI 1975/1039 (N.I. 9)	25 June 1975
Roads (Northern Ireland) Order 1975	SI 1975/1040 (N.I. 10)	25 June 1975
Appropriation (No. 2) (Northern Ireland) Order 1975	SI 1975/1212 (N.I. 11)	23 July 1975
Diseases of Animals (Amendment) (Northern Ireland) Order 1975	SI 1975/1307 (N.I. 12)	6 August 1975
Local Government (Reduction of General Grant) (Northern Ireland) Order 1975	SI 1975/1308 (N.I. 13)	6 August 1975
Shipbuilding Industry (No. 2) (Northern Ireland) Order 1975	SI 1975/1309 (N.I. 14)	6 August 1975
Social Security Pensions (Northern Ireland) Order 1975	SI 1975/1503 (N.I. 15)	17 September 1975
Child Benefit (Northern Ireland) Order 1975	SI 1975/1504 (N.I. 16)	17 September 1975
Artificial Reproduction of Animals (Northern Ireland) Order 1975	SI 1975/1834 (N.I. 17)	12 November 1975
Appropriation (No. 3) (Northern Ireland) Order 1975	SI 1975/2176 (N.I. 18)	19 December 1975
Bann Reservoir Company (Northern Ireland) Order 1975	SI 1975/2177 (N.I. 19)	19 December 1975
Firearms (Amendment) (Northern Ireland) Order 1975	SI 1975/2178 (N.I. 20)	19 December 1975
Rates (Northern Ireland) Order 1975	SI 1975/2179 (N.I. 21)	19 December 1975

=== 1976 ===
Title	Citation	Date made
Unsolicited Goods and Services (Northern Ireland) Order 1976	SI 1976/57 (N.I. 1)	19 January 1976
Education (Northern Ireland) Order 1976	SI 1976/58 (N.I. 2)	19 January 1976
Insurance Companies (Northern Ireland) Order 1976	SI 1976/59 (N.I. 3)	19 January 1976
Treatment of Offenders (Northern Ireland) Order 1976	SI 1976/226 (N.I. 4)	18 February 1976
Appropriation (Northern Ireland) Order 1976	SI 1976/423 (N.I. 5)	17 March 1976
Department of Housing, Local Government and Planning (Dissolution) (Northern Ireland) Order 1976	SI 1976/424 (N.I. 6)	17 March 1976
Industrial and Provident Societies (Amendment) (Northern Ireland) Order 1976	SI 1976/425 (N.I. 7)	17 March 1976
Members' Pensions (Northern Ireland) Order 1976	SI 1976/426 (N.I. 8)	17 March 1976
Social Security and Family Allowances (Northern Ireland) Order 1976	SI 1976/427 (N.I. 9)	17 March 1976
Industries Development (Northern Ireland) Order 1976	SI 1976/580 (N.I. 10)	12 April 1976
Road Traffic (Drivers' Ages and Hours of Work) (Northern Ireland) Order 1976	SI 1976/581 (N.I. 11)	12 April 1976
Solicitors (Northern Ireland) Order 1976	SI 1976/582 (N.I. 12)	12 April 1976
Animals (Northern Ireland) Order 1976	SI 1976/1040 (N.I. 13)	12 April 1976
Births and Deaths Registration (Northern Ireland) Order 1976	SI 1976/1041 (N.I. 14)	12 April 1976
Sex Discrimination (Northern Ireland) Order 1976	SI 1976/1042 (N.I. 15)	2 July 1976
Industrial Relations (Northern Ireland) Order 1976	SI 1976/1043 (N.I. 16)	2 July 1976
Horse Racing and Betting (Northern Ireland) Order 1976	SI 1976/1157 (N.I. 17)	23 July 1976
Limitation (Northern Ireland) Order 1976	SI 1976/1158 (N.I. 18)	23 July 1976
Appropriation (No. 2) (Northern Ireland) Order 1976	SI 1976/1210)	30 July 1976
Department of the Civil Service (Northern Ireland) Order 1976	SI 1976/1211 (N.I. 20)	30 July 1976
Financial Provisions (Northern Ireland) Order 1976	SI 1976/1212 (N.I. 21)	30 July 1976
Pharmacy (Northern Ireland) Order 1976	SI 1976/1213 (N.I. 22)	30 July 1976
Poisons (Northern Ireland) Order 1976	SI 1976/1214 (N.I. 23)	30 July 1976
Firearms (Amendment) (Northern Ireland) Order 1976	SI 1976/1215 (N.I. 24)	30 July 1976
Housing (Northern Ireland) Order 1976	SI 1976/1780 (N.I. 25)	27 October 1976
Supplementary Benefits (Amendment) (Northern Ireland) Order 1976	SI 1976/1781 (N.I. 26)	27 October 1976
Appropriation (No. 3) (Northern Ireland) Order 1976	SI 1976/2146 (N.I. 27)	27 October 1976
Industrial Relations (No. 2) (Northern Ireland) Order 1976	SI 1976/2147 (N.I. 28)	27 October 1976

=== 1977 ===
Title	Citation	Date made
Noxious Weeds (Northern Ireland) Order 1977	SI 1977/52 (N.I. 1)	17 January 1977
Police (Northern Ireland) Order 1977	SI 1977/53 (N.I. 2)	17 January 1977
Electricity and Gas Undertakings (Financial Provisions) (Northern Ireland) Order 1977	SI 1977/427 (N.I. 3)	21 December 1977
Criminal Damage (Northern Ireland) Order 1977	SI 1977/426 (N.I. 4)	9 March 1977
Appropriation (Northern Ireland) Order 1977	SI 1977/594 (N.I. 5)	30 March 1977
Consumer Protection and Advice (Northern Ireland) Order 1977	SI 1977/595 (N.I. 6)	30 March 1977
Gas (Northern Ireland) Order 1977	SI 1977/596 (N.I. 7)	30 March 1977
Housing Finance (Northern Ireland) Order 1977	SI 1977/597 (N.I. 8)	30 March 1977
Rates Amendment (Northern Ireland) Order 1977	SI 1977/598 (N.I. 9)	30 March 1977
Transport (Northern Ireland) Order 1977	SI 1977/599 (N.I. 10)	30 March 1977
Social Security (Miscellaneous Provisions) (Northern Ireland) Order 1977	SI 1977/610 (N.I. 11)	30 March 1977
Agriculture (Miscellaneous Provisions) (Northern Ireland) Order 1977	SI 1977/1245 (N.I. 12)	26 July 1977
Appropriation (No. 2) (Northern Ireland) Order 1977	SI 1977/1246 (N.I. 13)	26 July 1977
Criminal Damage (Compensation) (Northern Ireland) Order 1977	SI 1977/1247 (N.I. 14)	26 July 1977
Criminal Injuries (Compensation) (Northern Ireland) Order 1977	SI 1977/1248 (N.I. 15)	26 July 1977
Criminal Law (Amendment) (Northern Ireland) Order 1977	SI 1977/1249 (N.I. 16)	26 July 1977
Family Law Reform (Northern Ireland) Order 1977	SI 1977/1250 (N.I. 17)	26 July 1977
Fatal Accidents (Northern Ireland) Order 1977	SI 1977/1251 (N.I. 18)	26 July 1977
Legal Aid, Advice and Assistance (Northern Ireland) Order 1977	SI 1977/1252 (N.I. 19)	26 July 1977
Preferential Payments in Insolvency (Northern Ireland) Order 1977	SI 1977/1253 (N.I. 20)	26 July 1977
Stock Exchange (Completion of Bargains) (Northern Ireland) Order 1977	SI 1977/1254 (N.I. 21)	26 July 1977
Agricultural Wages (Regulation) (Northern Ireland) Order 1977	SI 1977/2151 (N.I. 22)	21 December 1977
Appropriation (No. 3) (Northern Ireland) Order 1977	SI 1977/2152 (N.I. 23)	21 December 1977
Development of Tourist Traffic (Northern Ireland) Order 1977	SI 1977/2153 (N.I. 24)	21 December 1977
Electricity Service (Finance) (Northern Ireland) Order 1977	SI 1977/2154 (N.I. 24)	21 December 1977
Road Races (Northern Ireland) Order 1977	SI 1977/2155 (N.I. 25)	21 December 1977
Supplementary Benefits (Northern Ireland) Order 1977	SI 1977/2156 (N.I. 27)	21 December 1977
Rates (Northern Ireland) Order 1977	SI 1977/2157 (N.I. 28)	21 December 1977

=== 1978 ===
Title	Citation	Date made
Appropriation (Northern Ireland) Order 1978	SI 1978/456 (N.I. 1)	21 March 1978
Housing (Northern Ireland) Order 1978	SI 1978/457 (N.I. 2)	21 March 1978
Industries Development (Northern Ireland) Order 1978	SI 1978/457 (N.I. 3)	21 March 1978
Property (Northern Ireland) Order 1978	SI 1978/459 (N.I. 4)	21 March 1978
Sexual Offences (Northern Ireland) Order 1978	SI 1978/460 (N.I. 5)	21 March 1978
Appropriation (No. 2) (Northern Ireland) Order 1978	SI 1978/1036 (N.I. 6)	25 July 1978
Appropriation (No. 3) (Northern Ireland) Order 1978	SI 1978/1037 (N.I. 7)	25 July 1978
Building Regulations (Northern Ireland) Order 1978	SI 1978/1038 (N.I. 8)	25 July 1978
Health and Safety at Work (Northern Ireland) Order 1978	SI 1978/1039 (N.I. 9)	25 July 1978
Education (Northern Ireland) Order 1978	SI 1978/1040 (N.I. 10)	25 July 1978
Financial Provisions (Northern Ireland) Order 1978	SI 1978/1041 (N.I. 11)	25 July 1978
Companies (Northern Ireland) Order 1978	SI 1978/1042 (N.I. 12)	25 July 1978
Home Purchase Assistance (Northern Ireland) Order 1978	SI 1978/1043 (N.I. 13)	25 July 1978
Licensing (Northern Ireland) Order 1978	SI 1978/1044 (N.I. 14)	25 July 1978
Matrimonial Causes (Northern Ireland) Order 1978	SI 1978/1045 (N.I. 15)	25 July 1978
Payments for Debt (Amendment) (Northern Ireland) Order 1978	SI 1978/1046 (N.I. 16)	25 July 1978
Protection of Children (Northern Ireland) Order 1978	SI 1978/1047 (N.I. 17)	25 July 1978
Planning (Amendment) (Northern Ireland) Order 1978	SI 1978/1048 (N.I. 18)	25 July 1978
Pollution Control and Local Government (Northern Ireland) Order 1978	SI 1978/1049 (N.I. 19)	25 July 1978
Rent (Northern Ireland) Order 1978	SI 1978/1050 (N.I. 20)	25 July 1978
Roads and Road Traffic (Northern Ireland) Order 1978	SI 1978/1051 (N.I. 21)	25 July 1978
Homes Insulation (Northern Ireland) Order 1978	SI 1978/1406 (N.I. 22)	25 July 1978
Theft (Northern Ireland) Order 1978	SI 1978/1407 (N.I. 23)	25 July 1978
Remand (Temporary Provisions) (Northern Ireland) Order 1978	SI 1978/1407 (N.I. 24)	25 July 1978
Appropriation (No. 4) (Northern Ireland) Order 1978	SI 1978/1906 (N.I. 25)	20 December 1978
Health and Personal Social Services (Northern Ireland) Order 1978	SI 1978/1907 (N.I. 26)	20 December 1978
Rehabilitation of Offenders (Northern Ireland) Order 1978	SI 1978/1908 (N.I. 27)	20 December 1978
Shops (Northern Ireland) Order 1978	SI 1978/1909 (N.I. 27)	20 December 1978

=== 1979 ===
Title	Citation	Date made
Aircraft and Shipbuilding Industries (Northern Ireland) Order 1979	SI 1979/294 (N.I. 1)	14 March 1979
Appropriation (Northern Ireland) Order 1979	SI 1979/295 (N.I. 1)	14 March 1979
Judgments Enforcement and Debts Recovery (Northern Ireland) Order 1979	SI 1979/296 (N.I. 3)	14 March 1979
Rates Amendment (Northern Ireland) Order 1979	SI 1979/297 (N.I. 4)	14 March 1979
Social Security (Northern Ireland) Order 1979	SI 1979/396 (N.I. 5)	30 March 1979
Appropriation (No. 2) (Northern Ireland) Order 1979	SI 1979/922 (N.I. 5)	26 July 1979
Firearms (Amendment) (Northern Ireland) Order 1979	SI 1979/923 (N.I. 6)	26 July 1979
Inheritance (Provision for Family and Dependants) (Northern Ireland) Order 1979	SI 1979/924 (N.I. 8)	26 July 1979
Pneumoconiosis, etc., (Workers' Compensation) (Northern Ireland) Order 1979	SI 1979/925 (N.I. 9)	26 July 1979
Tattooing of Minors (Northern Ireland) Order 1979	SI 1979/926 (N.I. 10)	3 December 1979
Legal Aid, Advice and Assistance (Northern Ireland) Order 1979	SI 1979/1572)	3 December 1979
Statutory Rules (Northern Ireland) Order 1979	SI 1979/1573 (N.I. 12)	3 December 1979
Industrial Assurance (Northern Ireland) Order 1979	SI 1979/1574 (N.I. 13)	3 December 1979
Administration of Estates (Northern Ireland) Order 1979	SI 1979/1575 (N.I. 14)	3 December 1979
Appropriation (No. 3) (Northern Ireland) Order 1979	SI 1979/1708 (N.I. 14)	19 December 1979
Building Regulations (Northern Ireland) Order 1979	SI 1979/1709 (N.I. 16)	19 December 1979
Control of Food Premises (Northern Ireland) Order 1979	SI 1979/1709 (N.I. 16)	19 December 1979
Mineral Exploration (Northern Ireland) Order 1979	SI 1979/1713 (N.I. 18)	19 December 1979
Perjury (Northern Ireland) Order 1979	SI 1979/1714 (N.I. 19)	19 December 1979

== 1980–1989 ==
=== 1980 ===
Title	Citation	Date made
Theatres (Northern Ireland) Order 1980	SI 1980/190 (N.I. 1)	13 February 1980
Appropriation (Northern Ireland) Order 1980	SI 1980/396 (N.I. 2)	19 March 1980
County Courts (Northern Ireland) Order 1980	SI 1980/397 (N.I. 3)	19 March 1980
Bankruptcy Amendment (Northern Ireland) Order 1980	SI 1980/561 (N.I. 4)	21 April 1980
Domestic Proceedings (Northern Ireland) Order 1980	SI 1980/563 (N.I. 5)	21 April 1980
Criminal Justice (Northern Ireland) Order 1980	SI 1980/704 (N.I. 6)	21 May 1980
Bees (Northern Ireland) Order 1980	SI 1980/869 (N.I. 7)	21 May 1980
Social Security (Northern Ireland) Order 1980	SI 1980/870 (N.I. 8)	21 May 1980
Appropriation (No. 2) (Northern Ireland) Order 1980	SI 1980/1083 (N.I. 9)	28 July 1980
Treatment of Offenders (Northern Ireland) Order 1980	SI 1980/1084 (N.I. 10)	28 July 1980
Roads (Northern Ireland) Order 1980	SI 1980/1085 (N.I. 11)	28 July 1980
Private Streets (Northern Ireland) Order 1980	SI 1980/1086 (N.I. 12)	28 July 1980
Social Security (No. 2) (Northern Ireland) Order 1980	SI 1980/1087 (N.I. 13)	28 July 1980
Remand (Temporary Provisions) (Northern Ireland) Order 1980	SI 1980/1626 (N.I. 14)	29 October 1980
Appropriation (No. 3) (Northern Ireland) Order 1980	SI 1980/1957 (N.I. 15)	17 December 1980
Education (Northern Ireland) Order 1980	SI 1980/1958 (N.I. 16)	17 December 1980
Financial Provisions (Northern Ireland) Order 1980	SI 1980/1959 (N.I. 17)	17 December 1980

=== 1981 ===
Title	Citation	Date made
Road Traffic (Northern Ireland) Order 1981	SI 1981/154 (N.I. 1)	10 February 1981
Firearms (Northern Ireland) Order 1981	SI 1981/155 (N.I. 2)	10 February 1981
Housing (Northern Ireland) Order 1981	SI 1981/156 (N.I. 3)	10 February 1981
Clean Air (Northern Ireland) Order 1981	SI 1981/158 (N.I. 4)	10 February 1981
Leasehold (Enlargement and Extension) Amendment (Northern Ireland) Order 1981	SI 1981/159 (N.I. 5)	18 February 1981
Judgments Enforcement (Northern Ireland) Order 1981	SI 1981/226 (N.I. 6)	18 February 1981
Fisheries Amendment (Northern Ireland) Order 1981	SI 1981/227 (N.I. 7)	18 February 1981
Legal Aid, Advice and Assistance (Northern Ireland) Order 1981	SI 1981/228 (N.I. 8)	18 February 1981
Social Security (Contributions) (Northern Ireland) Order 1981	SI 1981/230 (N.I. 9)	18 February 1981
Weights and Measures (Northern Ireland) Order 1981	SI 1981/231 (N.I. 10)	18 February 1981
Agricultural Trust (Abolition) (Northern Ireland) Order 1981	SI 1981/435 (N.I. 11)	18 March 1981
Appropriation (Northern Ireland) Order 1981	SI 1981/436 (N.I. 12)	18 March 1981
Local Government, Planning and Land (Northern Ireland) Order 1981	SI 1981/437 (N.I. 13)	18 March 1981
Museums (Northern Ireland) Order 1981	SI 1981/438 (N.I. 14)	18 March 1981
Enterprise Zones (Northern Ireland) Order 1981	SI 1981/607 (N.I. 15)	13 April 1981
Planning Blight (Compensation) (Northern Ireland) Order 1981	SI 1981/608 (N.I. 16)	13 April 1981
Public Order (Northern Ireland) Order 1981	SI 1981/609 (N.I. 17)	13 April 1981
Queen's University (Northern Ireland) Order 1981	SI 1981/610 (N.I. 18)	13 April 1981
Companies (Northern Ireland) Order 1981	SI 1981/838 (N.I. 19)	10 June 1981
Employment (Miscellaneous Provisions) (Northern Ireland) Order 1981	SI 1981/839 (N.I. 20)	10 June 1981
Appropriation (No. 2) (Northern Ireland) Order 1981	SI 1981/1114 (N.I. 21)	31 July 1981
Diseases of Animals (Northern Ireland) Order 1981	SI 1981/1115 (N.I. 22)	31 July 1981
Industrial Investment (Amendment) (Northern Ireland) Order 1981	SI 1981/1116 (N.I. 23)	31 July 1981
Road Traffic (Car-Sharing Arrangements) (Northern Ireland) Order 1981	SI 1981/1117 (N.I. 24)	31 July 1981
Social Security (Northern Ireland) Order 1981	SI 1981/1118 (N.I. 25)	31 July 1981
Magistrates' Courts (Northern Ireland) Order 1981	SI 1981/1675 (N.I. 26)	24 November 1981
Remand (Temporary Provisions) (Northern Ireland) Order 1981	SI 1981/1799 (N.I. 27)	31 July 1981
Appropriation (No. 3) (Northern Ireland) Order 1981	SI 1981/1813 (N.I. 28)	16 December 1981

=== 1982 ===
Title	Citation	Date made
Electricity Service (Finance) (Northern Ireland) Order 1982	SI 1982/155 (N.I. 1)	10 February 1982
Rates Amendment (Northern Ireland) Order 1982	SI 1982/156 (N.I. 2)	10 February 1982
Road Traffic (Seatbelts) (Northern Ireland) Order 1982	SI 1982/157 (N.I. 3)	10 February 1982
Social Security (contributions) (Northern Ireland) Order 1982	SI 1982/158 (N.I. 4)	10 February 1982
Appropriation (Northern Ireland) Order 1982	SI 1982/337 (N.I. 5)	10 March 1982
Departments (Northern Ireland) Order 1982	SI 1982/338 (N.I. 6)	10 March 1982
Limitation Amendment (Northern Ireland) Order 1982	SI 1982/339 (N.I. 7)	10 March 1982
Industrial Relations (Northern Ireland) Order 1982	SI 1982/528 (N.I. 8)	7 April 1982
Land Compensation (Northern Ireland) Order 1982	SI 1982/712 (N.I. 9)	18 May 1982
Probation Board (Northern Ireland) Order 1982	SI 1982/713 (N.I. 10)	18 May 1982
Departments (No. 2) (Northern Ireland) Order 1982	SI 1982/846 (N.I. 11)	23 June 1982
Agricultural Marketing (Northern Ireland) Order 1982	SI 1982/1080 (N.I. 12)	30 July 1982
Appropriation (No. 2) (Northern Ireland) Order 1982	SI 1982/1081 (N.I. 13)	30 July 1982
Forfeiture (Northern Ireland) Order 1982	SI 1982/1082 (N.I. 14)	30 July 1982
Industrial Development (Northern Ireland) Order 1982	SI 1982/1083 (N.I. 15)	30 July 1982
Social Security (Northern Ireland) Order 1982	SI 1982/1084 (N.I. 16)	30 July 1982
Companies (Northern Ireland) Order 1982	SI 1982/1534 (N.I. 17)	27 October 1982
Disabled Persons (Northern Ireland) Order 1982	SI 1982/1535 (N.I. 18)	27 October 1982
Homosexual Offences (Northern Ireland) Order 1982	SI 1982/1536 (N.I. 19)	27 October 1982
Planning (Amendment) (Northern Ireland) Order 1982	SI 1982/1537 (N.I. 20)	27 October 1982
Appropriation (No. 3) (Northern Ireland) Order 1982	SI 1982/1831 (N.I. 21)	22 December 1982
Criminal Injuries (Compensation) Amendment (Northern Ireland) Order 1982	SI 1982/1833 (N.I. 22)	22 December 1982
Wages Councils (Northern Ireland) Order 1982	SI 1982/1840 (N.I. 23)	22 December 1982

=== 1983 ===
Title	Citation	Date made
Financial Provisions (Northern Ireland) Order 1983	SI 1983/147 (N.I. 1)	11 February 1983
Milk (Northern Ireland) Order 1983	SI 1983/148 (N.I. 2)	11 February 1983
Road Traffic (Seatbelts) (Northern Ireland) Order 1983	SI 1983/149 (N.I. 3)	11 February 1983
Quarries (Northern Ireland) Order 1983	SI 1983/150 (N.I. 4)	11 February 1983
Appropriation (Northern Ireland) Order 1983	SI 1983/419 (N.I. 5)	16 March 1983
Licensing (International Airports) (Northern Ireland) Order 1983	SI 1983/419 (N.I. 5)	16 March 1983
Rates (Amendment) (Northern Ireland) Order 1983	SI 1983/421 (N.I. 7)	16 March 1983
Dogs (Northern Ireland) Order 1983	SI 1983/764 (N.I. 8)	18 May 1983
Property (Discharge of Mortgage by Receipt) (Northern Ireland) Order 1983	SI 1983/766 (N.I. 9)	18 May 1983
Rates (Amendment No. 2) (Northern Ireland) Order 1983	SI 1983/767 (N.I. 10)	18 May 1983
Appropriation (No. 2) (Northern Ireland) Order 1983	SI 1983/1117 (N.I. 11)	27 July 1983
Companies (Beneficial Interests) (Northern Ireland) Order 1983	SI 1983/1119 (N.I. 12)	27 July 1983
Criminal Attempts and Conspiracy (Northern Ireland) Order 1983	SI 1983/1120 (N.I. 13)	27 July 1983
Housing Benefits (Northern Ireland) Order 1983	SI 1983/1121 (N.I. 14)	27 July 1983
Housing (Northern Ireland) Order 1983	SI 1983/1118 (N.I. 15)	27 July 1983
Social Security Adjudications (Northern Ireland) Order 1983	SI 1983/1524 (N.I. 17)	19 October 1983
Access to the Countryside (Northern Ireland) Order 1983	SI 1983/1895 (N.I. 18)	21 December 1983
Appropriation (No. 3) (Northern Ireland) Order 1983	SI 1983/1896 (N.I. 19)	21 December 1983
Firearms (Northern Ireland) Order 1983	SI 1983/1899 (N.I. 20)	21 December 1983
Fisheries (Amendment) (Northern Ireland) Order 1983	SI 1983/1900 (N.I. 21)	21 December 1983
Judgments Enforcement (Attachment of Debts) (Northern Ireland) Order 1983	SI 1983/1904 (N.I. 22)	21 December 1983

=== 1984 ===
Title	Citation	Date made
Appropriation (Northern Ireland) Order 1984	SI 1984/359 (N.I. 1)	14 March 1984
Agriculture (Miscellaneous Provisions) (Northern Ireland) Order 1984	SI 1984/702 (N.I. 2)	18 May 1984
Fines and Penalties (Northern Ireland) Order 1984	SI 1984/703 (N.I. 3)	18 May 1984
Gas (Amendment) (Northern Ireland) Order 1984	SI 1984/704 (N.I. 4)	18 May 1984
Appropriation (No. 2) (Northern Ireland) Order 1984	SI 1984/858 (N.I. 5)	25 June 1984
Education (Northern Ireland) Order 1984	SI 1984/1156 (N.I. 6)	31 July 1984
Financial Provisions (Northern Ireland) Order 1984	SI 1984/1157 (N.I. 7)	31 July 1984
Health and Social Security (Northern Ireland) Order 1984	SI 1984/1158 (N.I. 8)	31 July 1984
Industrial Training (Northern Ireland) Order 1984	SI 1984/1159 (N.I. 9)	31 July 1984
University of Ulster (Northern Ireland) Order 1984	SI 1984/1167 (N.I. 10)	31 July 1984
Fire Services (Northern Ireland) Order 1984	SI 1984/1821 (N.I. 11)	22 November 1984
General Consumer Council (Northern Ireland) Order 1984	SI 1984/1822 (N.I. 12)	22 November 1984
Appropriation (No. 3) (Northern Ireland) Order 1984	SI 1984/1984 (N.I. 13)	19 December 1984
Family Law (Miscellaneous Provisions) (Northern Ireland) Order 1984	SI 1984/1984 (N.I. 14)	19 December 1984
Road Traffic, Transport and Roads (Northern Ireland) Order 1984	SI 1984/1986 (N.I. 15)	19 December 1984

=== 1985 ===
Title	Citation	Date made
Nature Conservation and Amenity Lands (Northern Ireland) Order 1985	SI 1985/170 (N.I. 1)	13 February 1985
Wildlife (Northern Ireland) Order 1985	SI 1985/171 (N.I. 2)	13 February 1985
Appropriation (Northern Ireland) Order 1985	SI 1985/452 (N.I. 3)	20 March 1985
Friendly Societies (Northern Ireland) Order 1985	SI 1985/453 (N.I. 4)	20 March 1985
Foreign Limitation Periods (Northern Ireland) Order 1985	SI 1985/754 (N.I. 5)	15 May 1985
Road Traffic (Type Approval) (Northern Ireland) Order 1985	SI 1985/755 (N.I. 6)	15 May 1985
Water and Sewerage Services (Amendment) (Northern Ireland) Order 1985	SI 1985/756 (N.I. 7)	15 May 1985
Appropriation (No. 2) (Northern Ireland) Order 1985	SI 1985/757 (N.I. 8)	25 June 1985
Milk (Cessation of Production) (Northern Ireland) Order 1985	SI 1985/958 (N.I. 9)	25 June 1985
Rent (Amendment) (Northern Ireland) Order 1985	SI 1985/959 (N.I. 10)	25 June 1985
Betting, Gaming, Lotteries and Amusements (Northern Ireland) Order 1985	SI 1985/1204 (N.I. 11)	31 July 1985
Credit Unions (Northern Ireland) Order 1985	SI 1985/1205 (N.I. 12)	31 July 1985
Historic Churches (Northern Ireland) Order 1985	SI 1985/1206 (N.I. 13)	31 July 1985
Gas (Northern Ireland) Order 1985	SI 1985/1207 (N.I. 14)	31 July 1985
Local Government (Miscellaneous Provisions) (Northern Ireland) Order 1985	SI 1985/1208 (N.I. 15)	31 July 1985
Social Security (Northern Ireland) Order 1985	SI 1985/1209 (N.I. 16)	31 July 1985
Child Abduction (Northern Ireland) Order 1985	SI 1985/1638 (N.I. 17)	30 October 1985
Sex Discrimination (Amendment) (Northern Ireland) Order 1985	SI 1985/1641 (N.I. 18)	30 October 1985
Nursing Homes and Nursing Agencies (Northern Ireland) Order 1985	SI 1985/1775 (N.I. 19)	18 November 1985

=== 1986 ===
Title	Citation	Date made
Local Government (Temporary Provisions) (Northern Ireland) Order 1986	SI 1986/221 (N.I. 1)	12 February 1986
Appropriation (Northern Ireland) Order 1986	SI 1986/593 (N.I. 2)	26 March 1986
Education and Libraries (Northern Ireland) Order 1986	SI 1986/594 (N.I. 3)	26 March 1986
Mental Health (Northern Ireland) Order 1986	SI 1986/595 (N.I. 4)	26 March 1986
Commission on Disposals of Land (Northern Ireland) Order 1986	SI 1986/767 (N.I. 5)	26 March 1986
Companies (Northern Ireland) Order 1986	SI 1986/1032 (N.I. 6)	23 June 1986
Business Names (Northern Ireland) Order 1986	SI 1986/1033 (N.I. 7)	8 July 1986
Company Securities (Insider Dealing) (Northern Ireland) Order 1986	SI 1986/1034 (N.I. 8)	8 July 1986
Companies Consolidation (Consequential Provisions) (Northern Ireland) Order 1986	SI 1986/1035 (N.I. 9)	8 July 1986
Appropriation (No. 2) (Northern Ireland) Order 1986	SI 1986/1037 (N.I. 10)	8 July 1986
Judgments Enforcement (Amendment) (Northern Ireland) Order 1986	SI 1986/1166 (N.I. 11)	8 July 1986
Legal Advice and Assistance (Amendment) (Northern Ireland) Order 1986	SI 1986/1167 (N.I. 12)	8 July 1986
Housing (Northern Ireland) Order 1986	SI 1986/1301 (N.I. 13)	25 July 1986
Social Need (Northern Ireland) Order 1986	SI 1986/1302 (N.I. 14)	25 July 1986
Criminal Justice (Northern Ireland) Order 1986	SI 1986/1883 (N.I. 15)	5 November 1986
Redundancy Rebates (Northern Ireland) Order 1986	SI 1986/1886 (N.I. 16)	5 November 1986
Road Races (Northern Ireland) Order 1986	SI 1986/1887 (N.I. 17)	5 November 1986
Social Security (Northern Ireland) Order 1986	SI 1986/1888 (N.I. 18)	5 November 1986
Financial Provisions (Northern Ireland) Order 1986	SI 1986/2021 (N.I. 19)	25 November 1986
Health and Personal Social Services (Amendment) (Northern Ireland) Order 1986	SI 1986/2023 (N.I. 20)	25 November 1986
Rates (Amendment) (Northern Ireland) Order 1986	SI 1986/2024 (N.I. 21)	25 November 1986
Appropriation (No. 3) (Northern Ireland) Order 1986	SI 1986/2227 (N.I. 22)	25 November 1986
Enterprise Ulster (Continuation of Functions) (Northern Ireland) Order 1986	SI 1986/2228 (N.I. 23)	25 November 1986
Health and Personal Social Services and Public Health (Northern Ireland) Order 1986	SI 1986/2229 (N.I. 24)	25 November 1986
Recreation and Youth Service (Northern Ireland) Order 1986	SI 1986/2232 (N.I. 25)	16 December 1986

=== 1987 ===
Title	Citation	Date made
Agriculture and Fisheries (Financial Assistance) (Northern Ireland) Order 1987	SI 1987/166 (N.I. 1)	10 February 1987
Education (Northern Ireland) Order 1987	SI 1987/167 (N.I. 2)	10 February 1987
Agriculture (Environmental Areas) (Northern Ireland) Order 1987	SI 1987/458 (N.I. 3)	10 February 1987
Appropriation (Northern Ireland) Order 1987	SI 1987/459 (N.I. 4)	18 March 1987
Audit (Northern Ireland) Order 1987	SI 1987/460 (N.I. 5)	18 March 1987
Education (Corporal Punishment) (Northern Ireland) Order 1987	SI 1987/461 (N.I. 6)	18 March 1987
Public Order (Northern Ireland) Order 1987	SI 1987/463 (N.I. 7)	18 March 1987
Social Fund (Maternity and Funeral Expenses) (Northern Ireland) Order 1987	SI 1987/464 (N.I. 8)	18 March 1987
Industrial Relations (Northern Ireland) Order 1987	SI 1987/936 (N.I. 9)	18 May 1987
Police (Northern Ireland) Order 1986	SI 1987/938 (N.I. 10)	18 May 1987
Appropriation (No. 2) (Northern Ireland) Order 1987	SI 1987/1274 (N.I. 11)	21 July 1987
Electricity Supply (Amendment) (Northern Ireland) Order 1987	SI 1987/1275 (N.I. 12)	21 July 1987
Licensing (Northern Ireland) Order 1987	SI 1987/1277 (N.I. 13)	21 July 1987
Registration of Clubs (Northern Ireland) Order 1987	SI 1987/1278 (N.I. 14)	21 July 1987
Occupiers' Liability (Northern Ireland) Order 1987	SI 1987/1280 (N.I. 15)	21 July 1987
Enduring Powers of Attorney (Northern Ireland) Order 1987	SI 1987/1627 (N.I. 16)	15 September 1987
Limitation (Amendment) (Northern Ireland) Order 1987	SI 1987/1629 (N.I. 17)	15 September 1987
AIDS (Control) (Northern Ireland) Order 1987	SI 1987/1832 (N.I. 18)	21 October 1987
Charities (Northern Ireland) Order 1987	SI 1987/2048 (N.I. 19)	26 November 1987
Consumer Protection (Northern Ireland) Order 1987	SI 1987/2049 (N.I. 20)	26 November 1987
Water (Fluoridation) (Northern Ireland) Order 1987	SI 1987/2052 (N.I. 21)	26 November 1987
Adoption (Northern Ireland) Order 1987	SI 1987/2203 (N.I. 22)	18 December 1987
Appropriation (No. 3) (Northern Ireland) Order 1987	SI 1987/2204 (N.I. 23)	18 December 1987

=== 1988 ===
Title	Citation	Date made
Appropriation (Northern Ireland) Order 1988	SI 1988/592 (N.I. 1)	23 March 1988
Social Security (Northern Ireland) Order 1988	SI 1988/594 (N.I. 2)	23 March 1988
Statistics of Trade and Employment (Northern Ireland) Order 1988	SI 1988/595 (N.I. 3)	23 March 1988
Criminal Injuries (Compensation) (Northern Ireland) Order 1988	SI 1988/793 (N.I. 4)	27 April 1988
Crossbows (Northern Ireland) Order 1988	SI 1988/794 (N.I. 5)	27 April 1988
General Assistance Grants (Abolition)(Northern Ireland) Order 1988	SI 1988/795 (N.I. 6)	27 April 1988
Wages (Northern Ireland) Order 1988	SI 1988/796 (N.I. 7)	27 April 1988
Fees &c (Northern Ireland) Order 1988	SI 1988/929 (N.I. 8)	25 May 1988
Minors' Contracts (Northern Ireland) Order 1988	SI 1988/930 (N.I. 9)	25 May 1988
Employment and Training (Amendment)(Northern Ireland) Order 1988	SI 1988/1087 (N.I. 10)	22 June 1988
Appropriation (No. 2) (Northern Ireland) Order 1988	SI 1988/1301 (N.I. 11)	26 July 1988
Farm Businesses (Northern Ireland) Order 1988	SI 1988/1302 (N.I. 12)	26 July 1988
Sex Discrimination (Northern Ireland) Order 1988	SI 1988/1303 (N.I. 13)	26 July 1988
Corneal Tissue (Northern Ireland) Order 1988	SI 1988/1844 (N.I. 14)	26 October 1988
Criminal Justice (Firearms)(Northern Ireland) Order 1988	SI 1988/1845 (N.I. 15	26 October 1988
Criminal Justice (Serious Fraud)(Northern Ireland) Order 1988	SI 1988/1846 (N.I. 16)	26 October 1988
Criminal Justice (Evidence, Etc.) (Northern Ireland) Order 1988	SI 1988/1847 (N.I. 17)	26 October 1988
Malicious Communications (Northern Ireland) Order 1988	SI 1988/1849 (N.I. 18)	26 October 1988
Scotch Whisky (Northern Ireland) Order 1988	SI 1988/1852 (N.I. 19)	26 October 1988
Criminal Evidence (Northern Ireland) Order 1988	SI 1988/1987 (N.I. 20)	14 November 1988
Education (Academic Tenure)(Northern Ireland) Order 1988	SI 1988/1988 (N.I. 21)	14 November 1988
Education (Unrecognised Degrees)(Northern Ireland) Order 1988	SI 1988/1989 (N.I. 22)	14 November 1988
Housing (Northern Ireland) Order 1988	SI 1988/1990 (N.I. 23)	14 November 1988
Health and Medicines (Northern Ireland) Order 1988	SI 1988/2249 (N.I. 24)	21 December 1988

=== 1989 ===
Title	Citation	Date made
Appropriation (Northern Ireland) Order 1989	SI 1989/484 (N.I. 1)	15 March 1989
Laganside Development (Northern Ireland) Order 1989	SI 1989/490 (N.I. 2)	15 March 1989
Nature Conservation and Amenity Lands (Amendment) (Northern Ireland) Order 1989	SI 1989/492 (N.I. 3)	15 March 1989
Matrimonial and Family Proceedings (Northern Ireland) Order 1989	SI 1989/677 (N.I. 4)	18 April 1989
Motor Vehicles (Wearing of Rear Seat Belts by Children) (Northern Ireland) Order 1989	SI 1989/680 (N.I. 5)	18 April 1989
Food (Northern Ireland) Order 1989	SI 1989/846 (N.I. 6)	16 May 1989
Financial Provisions (Northern Ireland) Order 1989	SI 1989/984 (N.I. 7)	13 June 1989
Appropriation (No. 2) (Northern Ireland) Order 1989	SI 1989/1336 (N.I. 8)	2 August 1989
Appropriation (No. 3) (Northern Ireland) Order 1989	SI 1989/1337 (N.I. 9)	2 August 1989
Firearms (Amendment) (Northern Ireland) Order 1989	SI 1989/1338 (N.I. 10)	2 August 1989
Limitation (Northern Ireland) Order 1989	SI 1989/1339 (N.I. 11)	2 August 1989
Police and Criminal Evidence (Northern Ireland) Order 1989	SI 1989/1341 (N.I. 12)	2 August 1989
Social Security (Northern Ireland) Order 1989	SI 1989/1342 (N.I. 13)	2 August 1989
Solicitors (Amendment) (Northern Ireland) Order 1989	SI 1989/1343 (N.I. 14)	2 August 1989
Treatment of Offenders (Northern Ireland) Order 1989	SI 1989/1344 (N.I. 15)	2 August 1989
Licensing and Clubs (Amendment) (Northern Ireland) Order 1989	SI 1989/1999 (N.I. 16)	1 November 1989
Appropriation (No. 4) (Northern Ireland) Order 1989	SI 1989/2402 (N.I. 17)	19 December 1989
Companies (Northern Ireland) Order 1989	SI 1989/2404 (N.I. 18)	19 December 1989
Insolvency (Northern Ireland) Order 1989	SI 1989/2405 (N.I. 19)	19 December 1989
Education Reform (Northern Ireland) Order 1989	SI 1989/2406 (N.I. 20)	19 December 1989
Human Organ Transplants (Northern Ireland) Order 1989	SI 1989/2408 (N.I. 21)	19 December 1989
Youth Service (Northern Ireland) Order 1989	SI 1989/2413 (N.I. 22)	19 December 1989

== 1990–1999 ==
=== 1990 ===
Title	Citation	Date made
Electricity Supply (Amendment) (Northern Ireland) Order 1990	SI 1990/245 (N.I. 1)	14 February 1990
Employment (Miscellaneous Provisions) (Northern Ireland) Order 1990	SI 1990/246 (N.I. 2)	14 February 1990
Health and Personal Social Services (Special Agencies)(Northern Ireland) Order 1990	SI 1990/247 (N.I. 3)	14 February 1990
Appropriation (Northern Ireland) Order 1990	SI 1990/592 (N.I. 4)	14 March 1990
Companies (Northern Ireland) Order 1990	SI 1990/593 (N.I. 5)	14 March 1990
Licensing (Northern Ireland) Order 1990	SI 1990/594 (N.I. 6)	14 March 1990
Transport (Amendment) (Northern Ireland) Order 1990	SI 1990/994 (N.I. 7)	14 March 1990
Industrial Training (Northern Ireland) Order 1990	SI 1990/1200 (N.I. 8)	7 June 1990
Appropriation (No. 2) (Northern Ireland) Order 1990	SI 1990/1305 (N.I. 9)	26 June 1990
Companies (No. 2) (Northern Ireland) Order 1990	SI 1990/1504 (N.I. 10)	24 July 1990
Education (Student Loans) (Northern Ireland) Order 1990	SI 1990/1506 (N.I. 11)	24 July 1990
Horse Racing (Northern Ireland) Order 1990	SI 1990/1508 (N.I. 12)	24 July 1990
Pensions (Miscellaneous Provisions) (Northern Ireland) Order 1990	SI 1990/1509 (N.I. 13)	24 July 1990
Planning and Building Regulations (Amendment) (Northern Ireland) Order 1990	SI 1990/1510 (N.I. 14)	24 July 1990
Social Security (Northern Ireland) Order 1990	SI 1990/1511 (N.I. 15)	24 July 1990
Horses (Protective Headgear for Young Riders) (Northern Ireland) Order 1990	SI 1990/2294 (N.I. 16)	24 July 1990
Criminal Justice (Confiscation) (Northern Ireland) Order 1990	SI 1990/2588 (N.I. 17)	19 December 1990

=== 1991 ===
Title	Citation	Date made
Health and Personal Social Services (Northern Ireland) Order 1991	SI 1991/194 (N.I. 1)	5 February 1991
Redundancy Fund (Abolition) (Northern Ireland) Order 1991	SI 1991/196 (N.I. 2)	5 February 1991
Road Traffic (Amendment) (Northern Ireland) Order 1991	SI 1991/197 (N.I. 3)	5 February 1991
Appropriation (Northern Ireland) Order 1991	SI 1991/759 (N.I. 4)	20 March 1991
Census (Confidentiality) (Northern Ireland) Order 1991	SI 1991/760 (N.I. 5)	20 March 1991
Financial Provisions (Northern Ireland) Order 1991	SI 1991/761 (N.I. 6)	20 March 1991
Food Safety (Northern Ireland) Order 1991	SI 1991/762 (N.I. 7)	20 March 1991
Repayment of Fees and Charges (Northern Ireland) Order 1991	SI 1991/764 (N.I. 8)	20 March 1991
Statutory Sick Pay (Northern Ireland) Order 1991	SI 1991/765 (N.I. 9)	20 March 1991
Dangerous Vessels (Northern Ireland) Order 1991	SI 1991/1219 (N.I. 10)	21 May 1991
Planning (Northern Ireland) Order 1991	SI 1991/1220 (N.I. 11)	21 May 1991
Cinemas (Northern Ireland) Order 1991	SI 1991/1462 (N.I. 12)	26 June 1991
Fisheries (Amendment) (Northern Ireland) Order 1991	SI 1991/1466 (N.I. 13)	26 June 1991
Access to Personal Files and Medical Reports (Northern Ireland) Order 1991	SI 1991/1707 (N.I. 14)	26 June 1991
Appropriation (No. 2) (Northern Ireland) Order 1991	SI 1991/1708 (N.I. 15)	24 July 1991
Criminal Justice (Northern Ireland) Order 1991	SI 1991/1711 (N.I. 16)	24 July 1991
Disability Living Allowance and Disability Working Allowance (Northern Ireland) Order 1991	SI 1991/1712 (N.I. 17)	24 July 1991
Fair Employment (Amendment) (Northern Ireland) Order 1991	SI 1991/1713 (N.I. 18)	24 July 1991
Genetically Modified Organisms (Northern Ireland) Order 1991	SI 1991/1714 (N.I. 19)	24 July 1991
Statistics (Confidentiality) (Northern Ireland) Order 1991	SI 1991/1721 (N.I. 20)	24 July 1991
Dangerous Dogs (Northern Ireland) Order 1991	SI 1991/2292 (N.I. 21)	16 October 1991
Social Security (Contributions) (Northern Ireland) Order 1991	SI 1991/2294 (N.I. 22)	16 October 1991
Child Support (Northern Ireland) Order 1991	SI 1991/2628 (N.I. 23)	19 November 1991
Judicial Pensions (Northern Ireland) Order 1991	SI 1991/2631 (N.I. 24)	19 November 1991
Children and Young Persons (Protection from Tobacco) (Northern Ireland) Order 1991	SI 1991/2872 (N.I. 25)	19 December 1991

=== 1992 ===
Title	Citation	Date made
Electricity (Northern Ireland) Order 1992	SI 1992/231 (N.I. 1)	11 February 1992
Radioactive Material (Road Transport) (Northern Ireland) Order 1992	SI 1992/234 (N.I. 2)	11 February 1992
Tourism (Northern Ireland) Order 1992	SI 1992/235 (N.I. 3)	11 February 1992
Appropriation (Northern Ireland) Order 1992	SI 1992/805 (N.I. 4)	16 March 1992
Industrial Relations (Northern Ireland) Order 1992	SI 1992/807 (N.I. 5)	16 March 1992
Local Government (Miscellaneous Provisions) (Northern Ireland) Order 1992	SI 1992/810 (N.I. 6)	16 March 1992
Registration (Land and Deeds) (Northern Ireland) Order 1992	SI 1992/811 (N.I. 7)	16 March 1992
Home Loss Payments (Northern Ireland) Order 1992	SI 1992/1307 (N.I. 8)	4 June 1992
Social Security (Mortgage Interest Payments) (Northern Ireland) Order 1992	SI 1992/1309 (N.I. 9)	4 June 1992
Still-Birth (Definition) (Northern Ireland) Order 1992	SI 1992/1310 (N.I. 10)	4 June 1992
Anatomy (Northern Ireland) Order 1992	SI 1992/1718 (N.I. 11)	4 June 1992
Appropriation (No. 2) (Northern Ireland) Order 1992	SI 1992/1719 (N.I. 12)	15 July 1992
Competition and Service (Electricity) (Northern Ireland) Order 1992	SI 1992/1720 (N.I. 13)	15 July 1992
Firearms (Amendment) (Northern Ireland) Order 1992	SI 1992/1723 (N.I. 14)	15 July 1992
Housing (Northern Ireland) Order 1992	SI 1992/1725 (N.I. 15)	15 July 1992
Licensing (Validation) (Northern Ireland) Order 1992	SI 1992/1726 (N.I. 16)	15 July 1992
Offshore, and Pipelines, Safety (Northern Ireland) Order 1992	SI 1992/1728 (N.I. 17)	15 July 1992
Pharmaceutical Services (Northern Ireland) Order 1992	SI 1992/2671 (N.I. 18)	28 October 1992
Private Streets (Amendment) (Northern Ireland) Order 1992	SI 1992/3203 (N.I. 19)	17 December 1992
Registered Homes (Northern Ireland) Order 1992	SI 1992/3204 (N.I. 20)	17 December 1992

=== 1993 ===
Title	Citation	Date made
Aircraft and Shipbuilding Industries (Repeals) (Northern Ireland) Order 1993	SI 1993/225 (N.I. 1)	9 February 1993
Social Security (Northern Ireland) Order 1993	SI 1993/592 (N.I. 2)	9 February 1993
Appropriation (Northern Ireland) Order 1993	SI 1993/600 (N.I. 3)	10 March 1993
Access to Health Records (Northern Ireland) Order 1993	SI 1993/1250 (N.I. 4)	12 May 1993
Financial Provisions (Northern Ireland) Order 1993	SI 1993/1252 (N.I. 5)	12 May 1993
Family Law (Northern Ireland) Order 1993	SI 1993/1576 (N.I. 6)	23 June 1993
Fire Services (Amendment) (Northern Ireland) Order 1993	SI 1993/1578 (N.I. 7)	23 June 1993
Social Security (Amendment) (Northern Ireland) Order 1993	SI 1993/1579 (N.I. 8)	23 June 1993
Appropriation (No. 2) (Northern Ireland) Order 1993	SI 1993/1788 (N.I. 9)	20 July 1993
Agriculture (Northern Ireland) Order 1993	SI 1993/2665 (N.I. 10)	27 October 1993
Industrial Relations (Northern Ireland) Order 1993	SI 1993/2668 (N.I. 11)	27 October 1993
Education and Libraries (Northern Ireland) Order 1993	SI 1993/2810 (N.I. 12)	16 November 1993
Criminal Justice (Confiscation) (Northern Ireland) Order 1993	SI 1993/3146 (N.I. 13)	16 December 1993
Environment and Safety Information (Northern Ireland) Order 1993	SI 1993/3159 (N.I. 14)	16 December 1993
Roads (Northern Ireland) Order 1993	SI 1993/3160 (N.I. 15)	16 December 1993
Water and Sewerage Services (Amendment) (Northern Ireland) Order 1993	SI 1993/3165 (N.I. 16)	16 December 1993

=== 1994 ===
Title	Citation	Date made
Airports (Northern Ireland) Order 1994	SI 1994/426 (N.I. 1)	24 February 1994
Health and Personal Social Services (Northern Ireland) Order 1994	SI 1994/429 (N.I. 2)	24 February 1994
Appropriation (Northern Ireland) Order 1994	SI 1994/762 (N.I. 3)	15 March 1994
Social Security (Contributions) (Northern Ireland) Order 1994	SI 1994/765 (N.I. 4)	15 March 1994
Statutory Sick Pay (Northern Ireland) Order 1994	SI 1994/766 (N.I. 5)	15 March 1994
Agriculture (Miscellaneous Provisions) (Northern Ireland) Order 1994	SI 1994/1891 (N.I. 6)	19 July 1994
Appropriation (No. 2) (Northern Ireland) Order 1994	SI 1994/1892 (N.I. 7)	19 July 1994
Betting and Lotteries (Northern Ireland) Order 1994	SI 1994/1893 (N.I. 8)	19 July 1994
Civil Service (Management Functions) (Northern Ireland) Order 1994	SI 1994/1894 (N.I. 9)	19 July 1994
Litter (Northern Ireland) Order 1994	SI 1994/1896 (N.I. 10)	19 July 1994
Rates (Amendment) (Northern Ireland) Order 1994	SI 1994/1897 (N.I. 11)	19 July 1994
Social Security (Incapacity for Work) (Northern Ireland) Order 1994	SI 1994/1898 (N.I. 12)	19 July 1994
Wills and Administration Proceedings (Northern Ireland) Order 1994	SI 1994/1899 (N.I. 13)	19 July 1994
Remand (Temporary Provisions) (Northern Ireland) Order 1994	SI 1994/1993 (N.I. 14)	27 July 1994
Criminal Justice (Northern Ireland) Order 1994	SI 1994/2795 (N.I. 15)	2 November 1994
Ports (Northern Ireland) Order 1994	SI 1994/2809 (N.I. 16)	2 November 1994
Firearms (Amendment) (Northern Ireland) Order 1994	SI 1994/3204 (N.I. 17)	14 December 1994

=== 1995 ===
Title	Citation	Date made
Appropriation (Northern Ireland) Order 1995	SI 1995/754 (N.I. 1)	15 March 1995
Children (Northern Ireland) Order 1995	SI 1995/755 (N.I. 2)	15 March 1995
Children's Evidence (Northern Ireland) Order 1995	SI 1995/757 (N.I. 3)	15 March 1995
Fair Employment (Amendment) (Northern Ireland) Order 1995	SI 1995/758 (N.I. 4)	15 March 1995
Local Government (Miscellaneous Provisions) (Northern Ireland) Order 1995	SI 1995/759 (N.I. 5)	15 March 1995
Wildlife (Amendment) (Northern Ireland) Order 1995	SI 1995/761 (N.I. 6)	15 March 1995
Armagh Observatory and Planetarium (Northern Ireland) Order 1995	SI 1995/1622 (N.I. 7)	28 June 1995
Arts Council (Northern Ireland) Order 1995	SI 1995/1623 (N.I. 8)	28 June 1995
Historic Monuments and Archaeological Objects (Northern Ireland) Order 1995	SI 1995/1625 (N.I. 9)	28 June 1995
Ports (Amendment) (Northern Ireland) Order 1995	SI 1995/1627 (N.I. 10)	28 June 1995
Appropriation (No. 2) (Northern Ireland) Order 1995	SI 1995/1969 (N.I. 11)	26 July 1995
Trade Union and Labour Relations (Northern Ireland) Order 1995	SI 1995/1980 (N.I. 12)	26 July 1995
Child Support (Northern Ireland) Order 1995	SI 1995/2702 (N.I. 13)	18 October 1995
Health and Personal Social Services (Amendment) (Northern Ireland) Order 1995	SI 1995/2704 (N.I. 14)	18 October 1995
Jobseekers (Northern Ireland) Order 1995	SI 1995/2705 (N.I. 15)	18t October 1995
Financial Provisions (Northern Ireland) Order 1995	SI 1995/2991 (N.I. 16)	23 November 1995
Police (Amendment) (Northern Ireland) Order 1995	SI 1995/2993 (N.I. 17)	23 November 1995
Road Traffic (Northern Ireland) Order 1995	SI 1995/2994 (N.I. 18)	23 November 1995
Street Works (Northern Ireland) Order 1995	SI 1995/3210 (N.I. 19)	13 December 1995
Polygamous Marriages (Northern Ireland) Order 1995	SI 1995/3211 (N.I. 20)	13 December 1995
Agriculture (Conservation Grants) (Northern Ireland) Order 1995	SI 1995/3212 (N.I. 21)	13 December 1995
Pensions (Northern Ireland) Order 1995	SI 1995/3213 (N.I. 22)	13 December 1995

=== 1996 ===
Title	Citation	Date made
Education (Northern Ireland) Order 1996	SI 1996/274 (N.I. 1)	14 February 1996
Gas (Northern Ireland) Order 1996	SI 1996/275 (N.I. 2)	14 February 1996
County Courts (Amendment) (Northern Ireland) Order 1996	SI 1996/277 (N.I. 3)	14 February 1996
Appropriation (Northern Ireland) Order 1996	SI 1996/721 (N.I. 4)	13 March 1996
Business Tenancies (Northern Ireland) Order 1996	SI 1996/725 (N.I. 5)	13 March 1996
Juries (Northern Ireland) Order 1996	SI 1996/1141 (N.I. 6)	24 April 1996
Commissioner for Complaints (Northern Ireland) Order 1996	SI 1996/1297 (N.I. 7)	15 May 1996
Ombudsman (Northern Ireland) Order 1996	SI 1996/1298 (N.I. 8)	15 May 1996
Proceeds of Crime (Northern Ireland) Order 1996	SI 1996/1299 (N.I. 9)	15 May 1996
Road Traffic Offenders (Northern Ireland) Order 1996	SI 1996/1320 (N.I. 10)	15 May 1996
Deregulation and Contracting Out (Northern Ireland) Order 1996	SI 1996/1632 (N.I. 11)	26 June 1996
Food Safety (Amendment) (Northern Ireland) Order 1996	SI 1996/1633 (N.I. 12)	26 June 1996
Health and Personal Social Services (Residual Liabilities) (Northern Ireland) Order 1996	SI 1996/1636 (N.I. 13)	26 June 1996
Appropriation (No. 2) (Northern Ireland) Order 1996	SI 1996/1917 (N.I. 14)	23 July 1996
Education (Student Loans) (Northern Ireland) Order 1996	SI 1996/1918 (N.I. 15)	23 July 1996
Employment Rights (Northern Ireland) Order 1996	SI 1996/1919 (N.I. 16)	23 July 1996
Explosives (Amendment) (Northern Ireland) Order 1996	SI 1996/1920 (N.I. 17)	23 July 1996
Industrial Tribunals (Northern Ireland) Order 1996	SI 1996/1921 (N.I. 18)	23 July 1996
Personal Social Services (Direct Payments) (Northern Ireland) Order 1996	SI 1996/1923 (N.I. 19)	23 July 1996
Housing Benefit (Payment to Third Parties) (Northern Ireland) Order 1996	SI 1996/2597 (N.I. 20)	15 October 1996
Domestic Energy Efficiency Schemes (Northern Ireland) Order 1996	SI 1996/2879 (N.I. 21)	19 November 1996
Licensing (Northern Ireland) Order 1996	SI 1996/3158 (N.I. 22)	19 December 1996
Registration of Clubs (Northern Ireland) Order 1996	SI 1996/3159 (N.I. 23)	19 December 1996
Criminal Justice (Northern Ireland) Order 1996	SI 1996/3160 (N.I. 24)	19 December 1996
Rates (Amendment) (Northern Ireland) Order 1996	SI 1996/3162 (N.I. 25)	19 December 1996
Succession (Northern Ireland) Order 1996	SI 1996/3163 (N.I. 26)	19 December 1996

=== 1997 ===
Title	Citation	Date made
Construction Contracts (Northern Ireland) Order 1997	SI 1997/274 (N.I. 1)	12 February 1997
Road Traffic Regulation (Northern Ireland) Order 1997	SI 1997/276 (N.I. 2)	12 February 1997
Theft (Amendment) (Northern Ireland) Order 1997	SI 1997/277 (N.I. 3)	12 February 1997
Appropriation (Northern Ireland) Order 1997	SI 1997/865 (N.I. 4)	19 March 1997
Education (Northern Ireland) Order 1997	SI 1997/866 (N.I. 5)	19 March 1997
Race Relations (Northern Ireland) Order 1997	SI 1997/869 (N.I. 6)	19 March 1997
Health Services (Primary Care) (Northern Ireland) Order 1997	SI 1997/1177 (N.I. 7)	8 April 1997
Property (Northern Ireland) Order 1997	SI 1997/1179 (N.I. 8)	8 April 1997
Protection from Harassment (Northern Ireland) Order 1997	SI 1997/1180 (N.I. 9)	8 April 1997
Public Order (Amendment) (Northern Ireland) Order 1997	SI 1997/1181 (N.I. 10)	8 April 1997
Social Security Administration (Fraud) (Northern Ireland) Order 1997	SI 1997/1182 (N.I. 11)	8 April 1997
Social Security (Recovery of Benefits) (Northern Ireland) Order 1997	SI 1997/1183 (N.I. 12)	8 April 1997
Appropriation (No. 2) (Northern Ireland) Order 1997	SI 1997/1754 (N.I. 13)	22 July 1997
Commissioner for Complaints (Amendment) (Northern Ireland) Order 1997	SI 1997/1758 (N.I. 14)	22 July 1997
Further Education (Northern Ireland) Order 1997	SI 1997/1772 (N.I. 15)	22 July 1997
Police (Health and Safety) (Northern Ireland) Order 1997	SI 1997/1774 (N.I. 16)	22 July 1997
Health and Personal Social Services (Private Finance) (Northern Ireland) Order 1997	SI 1997/2597 (N.I. 17)	30 October 1997
Industrial Pollution Control (Northern Ireland) Order 1997	SI 1997/2777 (N.I. 18)	26 November 1997
Waste and Contaminated Land (Northern Ireland) Order 1997	SI 1997/2778 (N.I. 19)	26 November 1997
Shops (Sunday Trading &c.) (Northern Ireland) Order 1997	SI 1997/2779 (N.I. 20)	26 November 1997
Civil Evidence (Northern Ireland) Order 1997	SI 1997/2983 (N.I. 21)	17 December 1997
Deregulation (Northern Ireland) Order 1997	SI 1997/2984 (N.I. 22)	17 December 1997

=== 1998 ===
Title	Citation	Date made
Education (Student Loans) (Northern Ireland) Order 1998	SI 1998/258 (N.I. 1)	11 February 1998
Museums and Galleries (Northern Ireland) Order 1998	SI 1998/261 (N.I. 2)	11 February 1998
Appropriation (Northern Ireland) Order 1998	SI 1998/747 (N.I. 3)	18 March 1998
Financial Provisions (Northern Ireland) Order 1998	SI 1998/749 (N.I. 4)	18 March 1998
Activity Centres (Young Persons' Safety) (Northern Ireland) Order 1998	SI 1998/1069 (N.I. 5)	22 April 1998
Family Homes and Domestic Violence (Northern Ireland) Order 1998	SI 1998/1071 (N.I. 6)	22 April 1998
Road Traffic (New Drivers) (Northern Ireland) Order 1998	SI 1998/1074 (N.I. 7)	22 April 1998
Employment Rights (Dispute Resolution) (Northern Ireland) Order 1998	SI 1998/1265 (N.I. 8)	19 May 1998
Criminal Justice (Children) (Northern Ireland) Order 1998	SI 1998/1504 (N.I. 9)	24 June 1998
Social Security (Northern Ireland) Order 1998	SI 1998/1506 (N.I. 10)	24 June 1998
Fire Services (Amendment) (Northern Ireland) Order 1998	SI 1998/1549 (N.I. 11)	24 June 1998
Appropriation (No. 2) (Northern Ireland) Order 1998	SI 1998/1758 (N.I. 12)	21 July 1998
Education (Northern Ireland) Order 1998	SI 1998/1759 (N.I. 13)	21 July 1998
Education (Student Support) (Northern Ireland) Order 1998	SI 1998/1760 (N.I. 14)	21 July 1998
Employment Rights (Time off for Study or Training) (Northern Ireland) Order 1998	SI 1998/1761 (N.I. 15)	21 July 1998
Producer Responsibility Obligations (Northern Ireland) Order 1998	SI 1998/1762 (N.I. 16)	21 July 1998
Public Interest Disclosure (Northern Ireland) Order 1998	SI 1998/1763 (N.I. 17)	21 July 1998
Health and Safety at Work (Amendment) (Northern Ireland) Order 1998	SI 1998/2795 (N.I. 18)	17 November 1998
Local Government (Amendment) (Northern Ireland) Order 1998	SI 1998/2796 (N.I. 19)	17 November 1998
Criminal Justice (Northern Ireland) Order 1998	SI 1998/2839 (N.I. 20)	17 November 1998
Fair Employment and Treatment (Northern Ireland) Order 1998	SI 1998/3162 (N.I. 21)	16 December 1998
Rates (Amendment) (Northern Ireland) Order 1998	SI 1998/3164 (N.I. 22)	16 December 1998

=== 1999 ===
Title	Citation	Date made
Departments (Northern Ireland) Order 1999	SI 1999/283 (N.I. 1)	10 February 1999
Appropriation (Northern Ireland) Order 1999	SI 1999/658 (N.I. 2)	10 March 1999
Energy Efficiency (Northern Ireland) Order 1999	SI 1999/659 (N.I. 3)	10 March 1999
Strategic Planning (Northern Ireland) Order 1999	SI 1999/660 (N.I. 4)	10 March 1999
Trade Union Subscription Deductions (Northern Ireland) Order 1999	SI 1999/661 (N.I. 5)	10 March 1999
Water (Northern Ireland) Order 1999	SI 1999/662 (N.I. 6)	10 March 1999
Appropriation (No. 2) (Northern Ireland) Order 1999	SI 1999/1742 (N.I. 7)	22 June 1999
Criminal Evidence (Northern Ireland) Order 1999	SI 1999/2789 (N.I. 8)	12 October 1999
Employment Relations (Northern Ireland) Order 1999	SI 1999/2790 (N.I. 9)	12 October 1999
Licensing and Registered Clubs (Northern Ireland) Order 1999	SI 1999/3144 (N.I. 10)	24 November 1999
Welfare Reform and Pensions (Northern Ireland) Order 1999	SI 1999/3147 (N.I. 11)	24 November 1999

== 2000–present ==
=== 2000 ===
Title	Citation	Date made
Appropriation (Northern Ireland) Order 2000	SI 2000/742 (N.I. 1)	15 March 2000
Equality (Disability, etc.) (Northern Ireland) Order 2000	SI 2000/1110 (N.I. 2)	19 May 2000
Flags (Northern Ireland) Order 2000	SI 2000/1347 (N.I. 3)	17 May 2000

=== 2001 ===
Title	Citation	Date made
Financial Investigations (Northern Ireland) Order 2001	SI 2001/1866 (N.I. 1)	14 May 2001
Life Sentences (Northern Ireland) Order 2001	SI 2001/2564 (N.I. 2)	18 July 2001
Police (Northern Ireland) Order 2001	SI 2001/2513 (N.I. 3)	18 July 2001

=== 2002 ===
Title	Citation	Date made
Criminal Injuries Compensation (Northern Ireland) Order 2002	SI 2002/796 (N.I. 1)	26 March 2002
Employment (Northern Ireland) Order 2002	SI 2002/2836 (N.I. 2)	20 November 2002
Local Government (Miscellaneous Provisions) (Northern Ireland) Order 2002	SI 2002/3149 (N.I. 3)	17 December 2002
Company Directors Disqualification (Northern Ireland) Order 2002	SI 2002/3150 (N.I. 4)	17 December 2002
Fur Farming (Prohibition) (Northern Ireland) Order 2002	SI 2002/3151 (N.I. 5)	17 December 2002
Insolvency (Northern Ireland) Order 2002	SI 2002/3152 (N.I. 6)	17 December 2002
Environment (Northern Ireland) Order 2002	SI 2002/3153 (N.I. 7)	17 December 2002
Housing Support Services (Northern Ireland) Order 2002	SI 2002/3154 (N.I. 8)	17 December 2002
Harbours (Northern Ireland) Order 2002	SI 2002/3155 (N.I. 9)	17 December 2002

=== 2003 ===
Title	Citation	Date made
Strategic Investment and Regeneration of Sites (Northern Ireland) Order 2003	SI 2003/410 (N.I. 1)	27 February 2003
Housing (Northern Ireland) Order 2003	SI 2003/412 (N.I. 2)	27 February 2003
Marriage (Northern Ireland) Order 2003	SI 2003/413 (N.I. 3)	27 February 2003
Protection of Children and Vulnerable Adults (Northern Ireland) Order 2003	SI 2003/417 (N.I. 4)	27 February 2003
Audit and Accountability (Northern Ireland) Order 2003	SI 2003/418 (N.I. 5)	27 February 2003
Energy (Northern Ireland) Order 2003	SI 2003/419 (N.I. 6)	27 February 2003
Budget (Northern Ireland) Order 2003	SI 2003/420 (N.I. 7)	27 February 2003
Planning (Amendment) (Northern Ireland) Order 2003	SI 2003/430 (N.I. 8)	27 February 2003
Health and Personal Social Services (Quality, Improvement and Regulation) (Northern Ireland) Order 2003	SI 2003/431 (N.I. 9)	27 February 2003
Access to Justice (Northern Ireland) Order 2003	SI 2003/435 (N.I. 10)	27 February 2003
Commissioner for Children and Young People (Northern Ireland) Order 2003	SI 2003/439 (N.I. 11)	27 February 2003
Education and Libraries (Northern Ireland) Order 2003	SI 2003/424 (N.I. 12)	27 February 2003
Criminal Justice (Northern Ireland) Order 2003	SI 2003/1247 (N.I. 13)	8 May 2003
Budget (No.2) (Northern Ireland) Order 2003	SI 2003/1885 (N.I. 14)	17 July 2003
Employment (Northern Ireland) Order 2003	SI 2003/2902 (N.I. 15)	13 November 2003
Road Traffic (Driving Disqualifications) (Northern Ireland) Order 2003	SI 2003/2903 (N.I. 16)	13 November 2003
Partnership etc. (Removal of Twenty Member Limit) (Northern Ireland) Order 2003	SI 2003/2904 (N.I. 17)	13 November 2003
Criminal Justice (No. 2) (Northern Ireland) Order 2003	SI 2003/3194 (N.I. 18)	10 December 2003
Food Benefit Schemes (Northern Ireland) Order 2003	SI 2003/3202 (N.I. 19)	10 December 2003

=== 2004 ===
Title	Citation	Date made
Betting and Gaming (Northern Ireland) Order 2004	SI 2004/310 (N.I. 1)	11 February 2004
Primary Medical Services (Northern Ireland) Order 2004	SI 2004/311 (N.I. 2)	11 February 2004
Firearms (Northern Ireland) Order 2004	SI 2004/702 (N.I. 3)	10 March 2004
Rates (Amendment) (Northern Ireland) Order 2004	SI 2004/703 (N.I. 4)	10 March 2004
Prison (Amendment) (Northern Ireland) Order 2004	SI 2004/704 (N.I. 5)	10 March 2004
Budget (Northern Ireland) Order 2004	SI 2004/707 (N.I. 6)	10 March 2004
Agricultural Statistics (Northern Ireland) Order 2004	SI 2004/1109 (N.I. 7)	14 April 2004
Mental Health (Amendment) (Northern Ireland) Order 2004	SI 2004/1272 (N.I. 8)	6 May 2004
Criminal Justice (Northern Ireland) Order 2004	SI 2004/1500 (N.I. 9)	27 July 2004
Criminal Justice (Evidence) (Northern Ireland) Order 2004	SI 2004/1501 (N.I. 10)	10 June 2004
Age-Related Payments (Northern Ireland) Order 2004	SI 2004/1987 (N.I. 11)	27 July 2004
Anti-social Behaviour (Northern Ireland) Order 2004	SI 2004/1988 (N.I. 12)	27 July 2004
Solicitors (Amendment) (Northern Ireland) Order 2004	SI 2004/1989 (N.I. 13)	27 July 2004
Vehicle Testing (Temporary Exemptions) (Northern Ireland) Order 2004	SI 2004/1990 (N.I. 14)	27 July 2004
Criminal Justice (No. 2) (Northern Ireland) Order 2004	SI 2004/1991 (N.I. 15)	27 July 2004
Dangerous Wild Animals (Northern Ireland) Order 2004	SI 2004/1993 (N.I. 16)	27 July 2004
Licensing (Indoor Arena) (Northern Ireland) Order 2004	SI 2004/1994 (N.I. 17)	27 July 2004
Budget (No. 2) (Northern Ireland) Order 2004	SI 2004/1996 (N.I. 18)	27 July 2004
Employment Relations (Northern Ireland) Order 2004	SI 2004/3078 (N.I. 19)	17 November 2004
Roads (Amendment) (Northern Ireland) Order 2004	SI 2004/3079 (N.I. 20)	17 November 2004
Financial Assistance for Young Farmers (Northern Ireland) Order 2004	SI 2004/3080 (N.I. 21)	16 December 2004
Financial Provisions (Northern Ireland) Order 2004	SI 2004/3326 (N.I. 22)	16 December 2004
Agriculture (Northern Ireland) Order 2004	SI 2004/3327 (N.I. 23)	16 December 2004

=== 2005 ===
Title	Citation	Date made
Pensions (Northern Ireland) Order 2005	SI 2005/255 (N.I. 1)	9 February 2005
Public Processions (Amendment) (Northern Ireland) Order 2005	SI 2005/857 (N.I. 2)	22 March 2005
Budget (Northern Ireland) Order 2005	SI 2005/860 (N.I. 3)	22 March 2005
District Policing Partnerships (Northern Ireland) Order 2005	SI 2005/861 (N.I. 4)	22 March 2005
Higher Education (Northern Ireland) Order 2005	SI 2005/1116 (N.I. 5)	6 April 2005
Special Educational Needs and Disability (Northern Ireland) Order 2005	SI 2005/1117 (N.I. 6)	6 April 2005
Law Reform (Miscellaneous Provisions) (Northern Ireland) Order 2005	SI 2005/1452 (N.I. 7)	7 June 2005
Drainage (Amendment) (Northern Ireland) Order 2005	SI 2005/1453 (N.I. 8)	7 June 2005
Company Directors Disqualification (Amendment) (Northern Ireland) Order 2005	SI 2005/1454 (N.I. 9)	7 June 2005
Insolvency (Northern Ireland) Order 2005	SI 2005/1455 (N.I. 10)	7 June 2005
Unauthorised Encampments (Northern Ireland) Order 2005	SI 2005/1961 (N.I. 11)	19 July 2005
Budget (No. 2) (Northern Ireland) Order 2005	SI 2005/1962 (N.I. 12)	19 July 2005
Colleges of Education (Northern Ireland) Order 2005	SI 2005/1963 (N.I. 13)	19 July 2005
Traffic Management (Northern Ireland) Order 2005	SI 2005/1964 (N.I. 14)	19 July 2005
Criminal Justice (Northern Ireland) Order 2005	SI 2005/1965 (N.I. 15)	19 July 2005
Firearms (Amendment) (Northern Ireland) Order 2005	SI 2005/1966 (N.I. 16)	19 July 2005
Companies (Audit, Investigations and Community Enterprise) (Northern Ireland) Order 2005	SI 2005/1967 (N.I. 17)	19 July 2005
Local Government (Northern Ireland) Order 2005	SI 2005/1968 (N.I. 18)	19 July 2005
Legal Aid (Northern Ireland) Order 2005	SI 2005/3423 (N.I. 19)	14 December 2005
Employment (Miscellaneous Provisions) (Northern Ireland) Order 2005	SI 2005/3424 (N.I. 20)	14 December 2005

=== 2006 ===
Title	Citation	Date made
Disability Discrimination (Northern Ireland) Order 2006	SI 2006/312 (N.I. 1)	14 February 2006
Safety of Sports Grounds (Northern Ireland) Order 2006	SI 2006/313 (N.I. 2)	14 February 2006
Industrial and Provident Societies (Northern Ireland) Order 2006	SI 2006/314 (N.I. 3)	14 February 2006
Rates (Capital Values, etc.) (Northern Ireland) Order 2006	SI 2006/611 (N.I. 4)	8 March 2006
Stormont Estate (Northern Ireland) Order 2006	SI 2006/612 (N.I. 5)	8 March 2006
Budget (Northern Ireland) Order 2006	SI 2006/613 (N.I. 6)	8 March 2006
Planning Reform (Northern Ireland) Order 2006	SI 2006/1252 (N.I. 7)	9 May 2006
Local Government (Boundaries) (Northern Ireland) Order 2006	SI 2006/1253 (N.I. 8)	9 May 2006
Fire and Rescue Services (Northern Ireland) Order 2006	SI 2006/1254 (N.I. 9)	7 June 2006
Private Tenancies (Northern Ireland) Order 2006	SI 2006/1459 (N.I. 10)	7 June 2006
Education (Northern Ireland) Order 2006	SI 2006/1915 (N.I. 11)	19 July 2006
Budget (No. 2) (Northern Ireland) Order 2006	SI 2006/1916 (N.I. 12)	19 July 2006
Recovery of Health Services Charges (Northern Ireland) Order 2006	SI 2006/1944 (N.I. 13)	19 July 2006
Law Reform (Miscellaneous Provisions) (Northern Ireland) Order 2006	SI 2006/1945 (N.I. 14)	19 July 2006
Water and Sewerage Services (Miscellaneous Provisions) (Northern Ireland) Order 2006	SI 2006/1946 (N.I. 15)	19 July 2006
Work and Families (Northern Ireland) Order 2006	SI 2006/1947 (N.I. 16)	19 July 2006
Victims and Survivors (Northern Ireland) Order 2006	SI 2006/2953 (N.I. 17)	14 November 2006
Rates (Amendment) (Northern Ireland) Order 2006	SI 2006/2954 (N.I. 18)	14 November 2006
Electricity Consents (Planning) (Northern Ireland) Order 2006	SI 2006/2955 (N.I. 19)	14 November 2006
Smoking (Northern Ireland) Order 2006	SI 2006/2957 (N.I. 20)	14 November 2006
Water and Sewerage Services (Northern Ireland) Order 2006	SI 2006/3336 (N.I. 21)	14 December 2006
Housing (Amendment) (Northern Ireland) Order 2006	SI 2006/3337 (N.I. 22)	14 December 2006

=== 2007 ===
Title	Citation	Date made
Street Works (Amendment) (Northern Ireland) Order 2007	SI 2007/287 (N.I. 1)	7 February 2007
Police and Criminal Evidence (Amendment) (Northern Ireland) Order 2007	SI 2007/288 (N.I. 2)	6 March 2007
Waste (Amendment) (Northern Ireland) Order 2007	SI 2007/611 (N.I. 3)	6 March 2007
District Electoral Areas Commissioner (Northern Ireland)(Amendment) Order 2007	SI 2007/612 (N.I. 4)	6 March 2007
Northern Ireland Policing Board (Northern Ireland) Order 2007	SI 2007/911 (N.I. 5)	21 March 2007
Policing (Miscellaneous Provisions) (Northern Ireland) Order 2007	SI 2007/912 (N.I. 6)	21 March 2007
Electricity (Single Wholesale Market) (Northern Ireland) Order 2007	SI 2007/913 (N.I. 7)	21 March 2007
Budget (Northern Ireland) Order 2007	SI 2007/914 (N.I. 8)	21 March 2007
Foyle and Carlingford Fisheries (Northern Ireland) Order 2007	SI 2007/915 (N.I. 9)	21 March 2007
Road Traffic (Northern Ireland) Order 2007	SI 2007/916 (N.I. 10)	21 March 2007
Safeguarding Vulnerable Groups (Northern Ireland) Order 2007	SI 2007/1351 (N.I. 11)	2 May 2007

=== 2008 ===
Title	Citation	Date made
Criminal Justice (Northern Ireland) Order 2008	SI 2008/1216 (N.I. 1)	7 May 2008
Sexual Offences (Northern Ireland) Order 2008	SI 2008/1769 (N.I. 2)	9 July 2008

=== 2009 ===
Title	Citation	Date made
Criminal Damage (Compensation) (Amendment) (Northern Ireland) Order 2009	SI 2009/884 (N.I. 1)	8 April 2009
Private Security Industry Act 2001 (Amendment) (Northern Ireland) Order 2009	SI 2009/3017 (N.I. 2)	17 November 2009

=== 2015 ===
Title	Citation	Date made
Welfare Reform (Northern Ireland) Order 2015	SI 2015/2006 (N.I. 1)	9 December 2015

=== 2016 ===
Title	Citation	Date made
Welfare Reform and Work (Northern Ireland) Order 2016	SI 2016/999 (N.I. 1)	12 October 2016
