= List of statutory instruments of the United Kingdom, 1972 =

This is an incomplete list of statutory instruments of the United Kingdom in 1972.

== Statutory instruments ==
=== 1-999 ===
- Raising of the School Leaving Age (Scotland) Regulations 1972 (SI 1972/59)
- Aerodromes (Designation) (Facilities for Consultation) Order 1972 (SI 1972/107)
- International Hydrographic Organisation (Immunities and Privileges) Order 1972 (SI 1972/119)
- International Tin Council (Immunities and Privileges) Order 1972 (SI 1972/120)
- Civil Aviation (Air Travel Organisers' Licensing) Regulations 1972 (SI 1972/223)
- County Court Funds (Amendment) Rules 1972 (SI 1972/334)
- Cornish Hush Mine (Storage Battery Locomotives) Special Regulations 1972 (SI 1972/348)
- Beckermet Mine (Storage Battery Locomotives) Special Regulations 1972 (SI 1972/396)
- Raising of the School Leaving Age Order 1972 (SI 1972/444)
- Burtree Pasture Mine (Storage Battery Locomotives) Special Regulations 1972 (SI 1972/483)
- Staffordshire Potteries Water Board (Leek Urban) Order 1972 (SI 1972/525)
- Prosecution of Offences (Northern Ireland) Order 1972 (SI 1972/538) (N.I. 1)
- Savings Certificates Regulations (SI 1972/614)
- Hovercraft (General) Order 1972 (SI 1972/674)
- Explosives (Northern Ireland) Order 1972 (SI 1972/730) (N.I. 3)
- Rickmansworth and Uxbridge Valley Water (Third Schedule) Order 1972 (SI 1972/752)
- National Savings Bank Regulations 1972 (SI 1972/764)
- Premium Savings Banks Regulations 1972 (SI 1972/765)
- Mid Southern Water Order 1972 (SI 1972/878)
- Highly Flammable Liquids and Liquefied Petroleum Gases Regulations 1972 (SI 1972/917)
- Merchant Shipping (Crew Agreements, Lists of Crew and Discharge of Seamen) Regulations 1972 (SI 1972/918)
- Merchant Shipping (Crew Arrangements, Lists of Crew and Discharge of Seamen) (Fishing Vessels) Regulations 1972 (SI 1972/919)
- Greater London (Electoral Areas) Order 1972 (SI 1972/924)
- Acquisition of Land (Rate of Interest after Entry)Regulations 1972 (SI 1972/949)
- Employer's Liability (Defective Equipment and Compulsory Insurance) (Northern Ireland) Order 1972 (SI 1972/963) (N.I. 6)
- Exported Animals (Compensation) (Northern Ireland) Order 1972 (SI 1972/964) (N.I. 7)

=== 1000-1999 ===
- Electricity Supply (Northern Ireland) Order 1972 (SI 1972/1072)
- Superannuation (Northern Ireland) Order 1972 (SI 1972/1073) (N.I. 10)
- Finance (Northern Ireland) Order 1972 (SI 1972/1100) (N.I. 11)
- Acquisition of Land (Rate of Interest after Entry) (No 2) Regulations 1972 (SI 1972/1126)
- Value Added Tax (General) Regulation 1972 (SI 1972/1147)
- Input Tax (Exceptions) (No. 1) Order 1972 (SI 1972/1165)
- Input Tax (Exceptions) (No. 2) Order 1972 (SI 1972/1166)
- Input Tax (Exceptions) (No. 3) Order 1972 (SI 1972/1167)
- Value Added Tax (Treatment of Transactions No. 1) Order 1972 (SI 1972/1170)
- Haile Moor Mine (Storage Battery Locomotives) Special Regulations 1972 (SI 1972/1235)
- Carrock Fell Mine (Storage Battery Locomotives) Special Regulations 1972 (SI 1972/1236)
- Electoral Law (Northern Ireland) Order 1972 (SI 1972/1264) (N.I. 13)
- Health and Personal Social Services (Northern Ireland) Order 1972 (SI 1972/1265) (N.I. 14)
- Heathrow Airport-London Noise Insulation Grants Scheme 1972 (SI 1972/1291)
- Merchant Shipping (Seamen's Documents) Regulations 1972 (SI 1972/1295)
- Pensions Increase (Annual Review) Order 1972 (SI 1972/1298)
- Prince of Wales Mine (Storage Battery Locomotives) Special Regulations 1972 (SI 1972/1393)
- Austria (Extradition) (Extension) Order 1972 (SI 1972/1581)
- European Communities (Enforcement of Judgements) Order 1972 (SI 1972/1590)
- Immigration (Control of Entry through the Republic of Ireland) Order 1972 (SI 1972/1610)
- Planning (Northern Ireland) Order 1972 (SI 1972/1634) (N.I. 17)
- Police Pensions (Amendment) Regulations 1972 (SI 1972/1642)
- Immigration (Ports of Entry) Order 1972 (SI 1972/1668)
- Criminal Appeal (References to European Court) Rules 1972 (SI 1972/1786)
- Merchant Shipping (Load Lines) (Particulars of Depth of Loading) Regulations 1972 (SI 1972/1841)
- Merchant Shipping (Provisions and Water) Regulations 1972 (SI 1972/1871)
- Merchant Shipping (Provisions and Water) (Fishing Vessels) Regulations 1972 (SI 1972/1872)
- Teachers (Colleges of Education) (Scotland) Amendment Regulations 1972 (SI 1972/1891)
- Local Government (Postponement of Elections and Reorganisation) (Northern Ireland) Order 1972 (SI 1972/1998) (N.I. 21)
- Local Government &c. (Northern Ireland) Order 1972 (SI 1972/1999) (N.I. 22)

=== 2000-2999 ===
- English Non-metropolitan Districts (Definition) Order 1972 (SI 1972/2039)

== See also ==
- List of statutory instruments of the United Kingdom
