= Consumer Credit Act =

Consumer Credit Act may refer to:

- Consumer Credit Act 1974, UK
- Consumer Credit Act 2006, UK
- Consumer Credit Protection Act of 1968, U.S.
