= List of acts of the Parliament of Northern Ireland, 1960–1969 =

This is a list of acts of the Parliament of Northern Ireland from 1960 to 1969.

From 1922 onwards, the short titles for these acts were distinguished from those passed by the Westminster parliament by the insertion of the bracketed words "Northern Ireland" between the word "act" and the year. Thus the Police Act (Northern Ireland) 1970 was an act passed by the Parliament of Northern Ireland, whereas the Police (Northern Ireland) Act 1998 was passed at Westminster.

Note that by convention "(N.I.)" is also added after the chapter number so as to avoid confusion with Westminster legislation.

== 1960 ==
Short title, or popular name	Citation	Royal assent
Long title
Consolidated Fund Act (Northern Ireland) 1960	1960 c. 1 (N.I.)	24 March 1960
Resident Magistrates' Pensions Act (Northern Ireland) 1960	1960 c. 2 (N.I.)	31 May 1960
An Act to amend the law relating to pension and superannuation benefits payable to, or in respect of service as, a resident magistrate and for purposes connected therewith.
Attempted Rape, etc., Act (Northern Ireland) 1960	1960 c. 3 (N.I.)	31 May 1960
An Act to authorise increased sentences for attempted rape or assault with intent to rape.
Disabled Persons (Employment) Act (Northern Ireland) 1960	1960 c. 4 (N.I.)	21 June 1960
Appropriation Act (Northern Ireland) 1960 (repealed)	1960 c. 5 (N.I.)	26 July 1960
(Repealed by Statute Law Revision (Northern Ireland) Act 1973 (c. 55)
Dogs Act (Northern Ireland) 1960	1960 c. 6 (N.I.)	26 July 1960
Finance Act (Northern Ireland) 1960	1960 c. 7 (N.I.)	26 July 1960
Census Act (Northern Ireland) 1960	1960 c. 8 (N.I.)	26 July 1960
Education (Amendment) Act (Northern Ireland) 1960 (repealed)	1960 c. 9 (N.I.)	26 July 1960
An Act to amend section thirty-six of the Education Act (Northern Ireland), 1923, (Note: Education Act (Northern Ireland) 1923 (13 & 14 Geo. 5. c. 21 (N.I.))) and section twenty-three of the Children and Young Persons Act (Northern Ireland), 1950; (Note: Children and Young Persons Act (Northern Ireland) 1950 (c. 5 (N.I.))) to amend sections eight, thirty-seven and eighty-six of the Education Act (Northern Ireland), 1947; (Note: Education Act (Northern Ireland) 1947 (c. 3 (N.I.))) to make further provision with respect to examinations and further education; and for purposes connected with the matters aforesaid. (Repealed by Education and Libraries (Northern Ireland) Order 1972 (SI 1972/1263)
Capital Grants to Industry (Amendment) Act (Northern Ireland) 1960	1960 c. 10 (N.I.)	26 July 1960
Transport (Borrowing Powers) Act (Northern Ireland) 1960	1960 c. 11 (N.I.)	26 July 1960
An Act to extend the borrowing powers of the Ulster Transport Authority; and for purposes connected therewith.
Exchequer and Audit (Amendment) Act (Northern Ireland) 1960	1960 c. 12 (N.I.)	20 December 1960
Appropriation (No. 2) Act (Northern Ireland) 1960 (repealed)	1960 c. 13 (N.I.)	20 December 1960
(Repealed by Statute Law Revision (Northern Ireland) Act 1973 (c. 55)
Expiring Laws Continuance Act (Northern Ireland) 1960 (repealed)	1960 c. 14 (N.I.)	20 December 1960
(Repealed by Statute Law Revision (Northern Ireland) Act 1973 (c. 55)
Inheritance (Family Provision) Act (Northern Ireland) 1960	1960 c. 15 (N.I.)	20 December 1960
An Act to amend the law relating to dispositions of estates of deceased persons; and for purposes connected therewith.
Business Tenancies (Extension of Temporary Provisions) Act (Northern Ireland) 1960	1960 c. 16 (N.I.)	20 December 1960
Drainage (Border Schemes) Act (Northern Ireland) 1960 (repealed)	1960 c. 17 (N.I.)	20 December 1960
(Repealed by Drainage (Northern Ireland) Order 1973 (SI 1973/69)
Registration of Still-Births Act (Northern Ireland) 1960	1960 c. 18 (N.I.)	20 December 1960
Agriculture (Miscellaneous Provisions) Act (Northern Ireland) 1960	1960 c. 19 (N.I.)	20 December 1960
Mortmain (Repeals) Act (Northern Ireland) 1960	1960 c. 20 (N.I.)	20 December 1960
An Act to repeal the enactments relating to mortmain.
Public Health Inspectors Act (Northern Ireland) 1960	1960 c. 21 (N.I.)	20 December 1960
Companies Act (Northern Ireland) 1960	1960 c. 22 (N.I.)	20 December 1960
An Act to re-enact with amendments the Companies Act (Northern Ireland), 1932, (Note: Companies Act (Northern Ireland) 1932 (22 & 23 Geo. 5. c. 7 (N.I.))) and for purposes connected with that matter.
Litter Act (Northern Ireland) 1960	1960 c. 23 (N.I.)	20 December 1960
National Insurance Act (Northern Ireland) 1960	1960 c. 24 (N.I.)	20 December 1960

== 1961 ==
=== Public acts ===
Short title, or popular name	Citation	Royal assent
Long title
Consolidated Fund Act (Northern Ireland) 1961	1961 c. 1 (N.I.)	28 March 1961
Loans ('Belfast' Air Freighter) Act (Northern Ireland) 1961 (repealed)	1961 c. 2 (N.I.)	28 March 1961
An Act to enable the Ministry of Commerce to make loans and to give guarantees to facilitate the production in Northern Ireland of the Belfast Air Freighter aircraft. (Repealed by Aid to Aircraft Industry Act (Northern Ireland) 1963 (c. 16 (N.I.))
Health Service Contributions Act (Northern Ireland) 1961	1961 c. 3 (N.I.)	13 June 1961
Electoral Registers Act (Northern Ireland) 1961	1961 c. 4 (N.I.)	13 June 1961
Legitimacy Act (Northern Ireland) 1961	1961 c. 5 (N.I.)	4 July 1961
An Act to amend the Legitimacy Act (Northern Ireland), 1928, (Note: Legitimacy Act (Northern Ireland) 1928 (18 & 19 Geo. 5. c. 5 (N.I.)) to legitimate the children of certain void marriages, and to provide for the revocation of adoption orders in cases of legitimation and for purposes connected with the matters aforesaid.
Appropriation Act (Northern Ireland) 1961	1961 c. 6 (N.I.)	4 July 1961
Welfare Services (Amendment) Act (Northern Ireland) 1961	1961 c. 7 (N.I.)	11 July 1961
Youth Employment Service Act (Northern Ireland) 1961	1961 c. 8 (N.I.)	11 July 1961
An Act to make provision for the establishment and functions of a Youth Employment Service in Northern Ireland; to provide for the appointment of officers and other staff; to require employers to give notice to the Service of vacancies; to make provision as to the duties and powers of the Service in relation to persons under the age of eighteen years and for purposes connected therewith.
Protection of Animals Act (Northern Ireland) 1961	1961 c. 9 (N.I.)	11 July 1961
Finance Act (Northern Ireland) 1961	1961 c. 10 (N.I.)	11 July 1961
An Act to amend the law relating to estate duty, stamp duties and certain duties of excise (including duties on mechanically-propelled vehicles, entertainments duty and pool betting duty); to impose an excise duty on certain advertisements inserted for payment in television programmes; to provide for the making of certain payments from the Terminable Revenues Sinking Fund to the Exchequer; and to make further provision in connection with finance.
Charitable Trustees (Incorporation) Act (Northern Ireland) 1961	1961 c. 11 (N.I.)	11 July 1961
Housing Act (Northern Ireland) 1961	1961 c. 12 (N.I.)	28 November 1961
An Act to make further provision with respect to housing (including slum clearance, housing on farms and rent restriction) and for purposes connected therewith.
Museum Act (Northern Ireland) 1961	1961 c. 13 (N.I.)	28 November 1961
An Act to provide for the establishment of a museum for Northern Ireland and for other purposes connected therewith.
Nurses and Midwives (Amendment) Act (Northern Ireland) 1961	1961 c. 14 (N.I.)	19 December 1961
Mental Health Act (Northern Ireland) 1961	1961 c. 15 (N.I.)	19 December 1961
Expiring Laws Continuance Act (Northern Ireland) 1961	1961 c. 16 (N.I.)	19 December 1961
Aid to Industry Act (Northern Ireland) 1961	1961 c. 17 (N.I.)	19 December 1961
Rights of Light Act (Northern Ireland) 1961	1961 c. 18 (N.I.)	19 December 1961
An Act to amend the law relating to rights of light, and for purposes connected with that matter.

=== Local acts ===
Short title, or popular name	Citation	Royal assent
Long title
Bann Reservoir Company Act (Northern Ireland) 1961	1961 c. i (N.I.)	4 July 1961
An Act to provide for the regulation and control of the water supplied to the City of Londonderry from the Faughan and Bann rivers, and for purposes connected therewith.
Belfast Corporation (General Powers) Act (Northern Ireland) 1961	1961 c. ii (N.I.)	4 July 1961
An Act to confer upon the Lord Mayor, Aldermen and Citizens of the City of Belfast additional powers and enact additional provisions with reference to their several undertakings and to matters relating to the health improvement and finances of the city; and for other purposes.
Belfast Harbour Act (Northern Ireland) 1961	1961 c. i (N.I.)	4 July 1961
An Act to consolidate and amend the enactments relating to the Belfast Harbour Commissioners and the harbour of Belfast, and for purposes consequential on or connected with the consolidation and amendment aforesaid.

== 1962 ==
=== Public acts ===
Short title, or popular name	Citation	Royal assent
Long title
Electricity (Borrowing Powers) Act (Northern Ireland) 1962	1962 c. 1 (N.I.)	30 January 1962
Youth Welfare, Physical Training and Recreation Act (Northern Ireland) 1962	1962 c. 2 (N.I.)	30 January 1962
Appropriation Act (Northern Ireland) 1962 (repealed)	1962 c. 3 (N.I.)	30 January 1962
(Repealed by Statute Law Revision (Northern Ireland) Act 1973 (c. 55)
Rating and Valuation (Amendment) Act (Northern Ireland) 1962	1962 c. 4 (N.I.)	30 January 1962
Foyle Fisheries (Amendment) Act (Northern Ireland) 1962	1962 c. 5 (N.I.)	13 February 1962
An Act to amend the Foyle Fisheries Act (Northern Ireland), 1952. (Note: Foyle Fisheries Act (Northern Ireland) 1952 (c. 5 (N.I.)))
Capital Grants to Industry (Amendment) Act (Northern Ireland) 1962	1962 c. 6 (N.I.)	13 February 1962
Administrative and Financial Provisions Act (Northern Ireland) 1962	1962 c. 7 (N.I.)	13 February 1962
An Act to amend section one of the Ulster Land Fund Act (Northern Ireland), 1949; (Note: Ulster Land Fund Act (Northern Ireland) 1949 (c. 16 (N.I.))) to amend section sixteen of the Exchequer and Financial Provisions Act (Northern Ireland), 1950; (Note: Exchequer and Financial Provisions Act (Northern Ireland) 1950 (c. 3 (N.I.))) to make schemes under section three of the Development Loans Act (Northern Ireland), 1945, (Note: Development Loans Act (Northern Ireland) 1945 (c. 20 (N.I.)) and section forty-two of the Teachers (Superannuation) Act (Northern Ireland), 1950, (Note: Teachers (Superannuation) Act (Northern Ireland) 1950 (c. 33 (N.I.))) statutory rules; to make certain pool betting activities lawful; to amend the Food and Drugs Act (Northern Ireland), 1958, (Note: Food and Drugs Act (Northern Ireland) 1958 (c. 27 (N.I.))) in relation to the sampling of milk and to legal proceedings and evidence; to authorise increases in certain charges upon the Consolidated Fund; to authorise an increase in the sums which may be issued out of the Government Loans Fund; to make provision with respect to the cost incurred by local authorities in repairing certain houses; to amend the Fifth Schedule to the Roads Act (Northern Ireland), 1948; (Note: Roads Act (Northern Ireland) 1948 (c. 28 (N.I.))) to authorise the retrospective operation of certain subordinate instruments; and for purposes connected with those matters.
Transport (Finance) Act (Northern Ireland) 1962	1962 c. 8 (N.I.)	13 February 1962
An Act to make provision for the discharge of certain liabilities of, and for the payment of certain grants to, the Ulster Transport Authority; to amend the law relating to the general duties and borrowing powers of the Ulster Transport Authority; and for purposes connected with those matters.
Family Allowances and National Insurance and Assistance Act (Northern Ireland) 1962	1962 c. 9 (N.I.)	
Trustee (Amendment) Act (Northern Ireland) 1962	1962 c. 10 (N.I.)	20 February 1962
Education (Amendment) Act (Northern Ireland) 1962 (repealed)	1962 c. 11 (N.I.)	20 February 1962
An Act to amend the provisions of the Education Act (Northern Ireland), 1947, (Note: Education Act (Northern Ireland) 1947 (c. 3 (N.I.))) relating to the notification of children and young persons requiring further care or supervision and to the medical inspection of pupils at grant-aided schools; to amend that Act so as to require the medical examination and classification of children unsuitable for education; to provide for the payment of grants to local education authorities in respect of university scholarships; and for purposes connected with those matters. (Repealed by Education and Libraries (Northern Ireland) Order 1972 (SI 1972/1263)
Public Health and Local Government (Miscellaneous Provisions) Act (Northern Ireland) 1962	1962 c. 12 (N.I.)	20 February 1962
An Act to make certain amendments to the law relating to public health and local government; and for purposes connected therewith.
Agricultural Produce (Meat Regulation and Pig Industry) Act (Northern Ireland) 1962 (repealed)	1962 c. 13 (N.I.)	29 March 1962
An Act to consolidate with amendments certain enactments relating to the sending of meat, bacon and dead rabbits from Northern Ireland, the licensing of bacon curers and the regulation of the production of pig products and for purposes connected with those matters. (Repealed by Fresh Meat (Hygiene and Inspection) Regulations (Northern Ireland) 1997 (SI 1997/493))
Electoral Law Act (Northern Ireland) 1962	1962 c. 14 (N.I.)	29 March 1962
An Act to consolidate with amendments certain enactments relating to parliamentary and local government elections, corrupt and illegal practices and election petitions.
Appropriation (No. 2) Act (Northern Ireland) 1962	1962 c. 15 (N.I.)	29 March 1962
Appropriation (No. 3) Act (Northern Ireland) 1962	1962 c. 16 (N.I.)	10 May 1963
Finance Act (Northern Ireland) 1962	1962 c. 17 (N.I.)	20 December 1962
An Act to amend the law relating to estate duty, stamp duties, excise duties on mechanically-propelled vehicles and certain other excise duties and licences, and to make further provision in connection with finance.
Land Registry (Miscellaneous Provisions) Act (Northern Ireland) 1962	1962 c. 18 (N.I.)	20 December 1962
Human Tissue Act (Northern Ireland) 1962 (repealed)	1962 c. 19 (N.I.)	20 December 1962
An Act to make provision with respect to the use of parts of bodies of deceased persons for therapeutic purposes and purposes of medical education and research and with respect to the circumstances in which post-mortem examinations may be carried out; and to permit the cremation of bodies removed for anatomical examination. (Repealed by Human Tissues Act 2004 (c. 30))
Business Tenancies (Extension of Temporary Provisions) Act (Northern Ireland) 1962	1962 c. 20 (N.I.)	20 December 1962

=== Local acts ===
Short title, or popular name	Citation	Royal assent
Long title
Ministry of Health and Local Government (Provisional Order Confirmation (Bangor Borough Extension) Act (Northern Ireland) 1962	1962 c. i (N.I.)	13 February 1962
An Act to confirm a Provisional Order of the Ministry of Health and Local Government relating to the extension of the Borough of Bangor.
Ministry of Health and Local Government Provisional Order Confirmation (Coleraine Borough Extension) Act (Northern Ireland) 1962	1962 c. ii (N.I.)	20 December 1962
An Act to confirm a Provisional Order of the Ministry of Health and Local Government relating to the extension of the Borough of Coleraine.

== 1963 ==
Short title, or popular name	Citation	Royal assent
Long title
Appropriation Act (Northern Ireland) 1963	1963 c. 1 (N.I.)	29 January 1963
Terms and Conditions of Employment Act (Northern Ireland) 1963	1963 c. 2 (N.I.)	29 January 1963
Pensions (Increase) Act (Northern Ireland) 1963	1963 c. 3 (N.I.)	29 January 1963
Development of Tourist Traffic (Amendment) Act (Northern Ireland) 1963	1963 c. 4 (N.I.)	29 January 1963
Recorded Delivery Service Act (Northern Ireland) 1963	1963 c. 5 (N.I.)	26 February 1963
An Act to authorise the sending by the recorded delivery service of certain documents and other things required or authorised to be sent by registered post; to authorise notices under the Eviction (Ireland) Act 1848 (Note: Eviction (Ireland) Act 1848 (11 & 12 Vict. c. 47)) to be sent by the recorded delivery service; and for purposes connected with those matters.
Constabulary Act (Northern Ireland) 1963	1963 c. 6 (N.I.)	26 February 1963
Teachers (Superannuation) (Amendment) Act (Northern Ireland) 1963 (repealed)	1963 c. 7 (N.I.)	26 February 1963
(Repealed by Superannuation (Northern Ireland) Order 1972 (SI 1972/1073)
Licensing Act (Northern Ireland) 1963	1963 c. 8 (N.I.)	5 March 1963
National Insurance Act (Northern Ireland) 1963	1963 c. 9 (N.I.)	5 March 1963
Industrial and Provident Societies Act (Northern Ireland) 1963	1963 c. 10 (N.I.)	15 March 1963
Milk (Amendment) Act (Northern Ireland) 1963	1963 c. 11 (N.I.)	15 March 1963
Special Roads Act (Northern Ireland) 1963	1963 c. 12 (N.I.)	26 March 1963
Consolidated Fund Act (Northern Ireland) 1963	1963 c. 13 (N.I.)	26 March 1963
Workmen's Compensation (Supplementation) Act (Northern Ireland) 1963	1963 c. 14 (N.I.)	21 May 1963
Agricultural Marketing (Amendment) Act (Northern Ireland) 1963	1963 c. 15 (N.I.)	7 June 1963
Aid to Aircraft Industry Act (Northern Ireland) 1963	1963 c. 16 (N.I.)	9 July 1963
Caravans Act (Northern Ireland) 1963	1963 c. 17 (N.I.)	9 July 1963
An Act to make provision for the licensing and control of caravan sites; to authorise local authorities to provide and operate caravan sites, and for purposes connected with those matters.
Transport (Finance) (Amendment) Act (Northern Ireland) 1963	1963 c. 18 (N.I.)	9 July 1963
An Act to make further provision with respect to payments to the Ulster Transport Authority under section 4 of the Transport (Finance) Act (Northern Ireland) 1962.
Appropriation (No. 2) Act (Northern Ireland) 1963	1963 c. 19 (N.I.)	9 July 1963
Health Services (Amendment) Act (Northern Ireland) 1963	1963 c. 20 (N.I.)	9 July 1963
Summary Jurisdiction (Appeals from Borstal Training Orders) Act (Northern Ireland) 1963	1963 c. 21 (N.I.)	9 July 1963
Finance Act (Northern Ireland) 1963	1963 c. 22 (N.I.)	9 July 1963
An Act to amend the law relating to estate duty, stamp duties and certain excise duties and excise licences; and to make further provision in connection with finance.
Bankruptcy (Amendment) Act (Northern Ireland) 1963 (repealed)	1963 c. 23 (N.I.)	9 July 1963
(Repealed by Insolvency (Northern Ireland) Order 1989 (SI 1989/2405)
Stock Transfer Act (Northern Ireland) 1963	1963 c. 24 (N.I.)	15 October 1963
An Act to amend the law with respect to the transfer of securities.
Companies (Amendment) Act (Northern Ireland) 1963	1963 c. 25 (N.I.)	15 October 1963
Housing Act (Northern Ireland) 1963	1963 c. 26 (N.I.)	15 October 1963
An Act to make further provision with respect to housing (including provision for the giving of further financial assistance for the improvement of housing and provision for the abatement of overcrowding in, and the management of, houses in multiple occupation); to amend the Housing of the Working Classes Act 1885; (Note: Housing of the Working Classes Act 1885 (48 & 49 Vict. c. 72)) and for purposes connected with any of those matters.
Education (Amendment) Act (Northern Ireland) 1963 (repealed)	1963 c. 27 (N.I.)	15 October 1963
An Act to alter the procedure for the appointment to a county school of certain teachers serving in any other county school; to provide for the employment of teachers upon approved terms and conditions for certain pupils requiring special educational treatment; to extend the provision of free board and lodging to certain pupils requiring such treatment; to make further provision regarding the enforcement of school attendance; to amend the law relating to schemes, which may be framed by local education authorities for assisting in the prevention of accidents to children proceeding to and from any grant-aided school; to remove certain disqualifications for being a teacher; to give certain powers of entry on land; to repeal spent and unnecessary provisions of the Education Acts (Northern Ireland) 1947 to 1962; and for purposes connected with the matters aforesaid. (Repealed by Education and Libraries (Northern Ireland) Order 1972 (SI 1972/1263)
Fire Services (Amendment) Act (Northern Ireland) 1963	1963 c. 28 (N.I.)	15 October 1963
Expiring Laws Continuance Act (Northern Ireland) 1963	1963 c. 29 (N.I.)	19 December 1963
Vaccination (Repeals) Act (Northern Ireland) 1963	1963 c. 30 (N.I.)	19 December 1963

== 1964 ==
Short title, or popular name	Citation	Royal assent
Long title
Limitation Act (Northern Ireland) 1964	1964 c. 1 (N.I.)	14 February 1964
An Act to amend the law relating to the limitation of actions, and for purposes connected therewith.
Appropriation Act (Northern Ireland) 1964	1964 c. 2 (N.I.)	14 February 1964
County Court Appeals Act (Northern Ireland) 1964	1964 c. 3 (N.I.)	18 February 1964
Aid to Industry (Amendment) Act (Northern Ireland) 1964	1964 c. 4 (N.I.)	18 February 1964
Occasional Licences (Amendment) Act (Northern Ireland) 1964	1964 c. 5 (N.I.)	3 March 1964
Administrative and Financial Provisions Act (Northern Ireland) 1964	1964 c. 6 (N.I.)	3 March 1964
An Act to authorise increases in certain charges upon the Consolidated Fund; to make further provision as to the salary of the Comptroller and Auditor-General; to empower the making of regulations with respect to certain securities; to authorise the erection of signs in relation to ancient monuments; to extend the purposes for which agricultural development loans may be made; to amend section 28 of and Schedule 2 to the National Assistance Act (Northern Ireland) 1948; (Note: National Assistance Act (Northern Ireland) 1948 (c. 13 (N.I.))) to extend the purposes for which grants may be made to welfare authorities; to amend section 2 of the Youth Welfare, Physical Training and Recreation Act (Northern Ireland) 1962; (Note: Youth Welfare, Physical Training and Recreation Act (Northern Ireland) 1962 (c. 2 (N.I.))) to amend section 16 of the Administrative and Financial Provisions Act (Northern Ireland) 1962; (Note: Administrative and Financial Provisions Act (Northern Ireland) 1962 (c. 7 (N.I.))) and for purposes connected with those matters.
Criminal Injuries (Amendment) Act (Northern Ireland) 1964	1964 c. 7 (N.I.)	3 March 1964
Marketing of Potatoes Act (Northern Ireland) 1964	1964 c. 8 (N.I.)	10 March 1964
An Act to make provision for ensuring that potatoes are not sent out of Northern Ireland except in compliance with proper standards of quality and subject to inspection; for that purpose to provide for the licensing of persons engaged in the marketing out of Northern Ireland of potatoes; to enable standards of quality for potatoes marketed in Northern Ireland to be prescribed; and to make provision connected with such matters.
Family Allowances and National Insurance Act (Northern Ireland) 1964	1964 c. 9 (N.I.)	10 March 1964
Consolidated Fund Act (Northern Ireland) 1964	1964 c. 10 (N.I.)	18 March 1964
Industrial Advice and Enterprise Act (Northern Ireland) 1964	1964 c. 11 (N.I.)	18 March 1964
Ministerial and Other Offices Act (Northern Ireland) 1964 (repealed)	1964 c. 12 (N.I.)	18 March 1964
(Repealed by Northern Ireland (Modification of Enactments—No. 1) Order 1973 (SI 1973/2163))
Agricultural Marketing Act (Northern Ireland) 1964	1964 c. 13 (N.I.)	5 May 1964
An Act to consolidate the Agricultural Marketing Act (Northern Ireland) 1933 to 1963.
Local Government (Members and Officers)	1964 c. 14 (N.I.)	19 May 1964
Building Societies Act (Northern Ireland) 1964	1964 c. 15 (N.I.)	2 June 1964
Clean Air Act (Northern Ireland) 1964	1964 c. 16 (N.I.)	9 June 1964
Ulster Folk Museum (Financial Provisions) Act (Northern Ireland) 1964	1964 c. 17 (N.I.)	30 June 1964
Industrial Training Act (Northern Ireland) 1964	1964 c. 18 (N.I.)	30 June 1964
Appropriation (No. 2) Act (Northern Ireland) 1964	1964 c. 19 (N.I.)	7 July 1964
Road Traffic Act (Northern Ireland) 1964	1964 c. 20 (N.I.)	7 July 1964
Magistrates' Courts Act (Northern Ireland) 1964	1964 c. 21 (N.I.)	7 July 1964
An Act to amend and consolidate the law relating to the offices of justice of the peace, resident magistrate and clerk of petty sessions, the jurisdiction of, and the practice and procedure before, magistrates' courts, and to matters connected therewith.
Protection of Depositors Act (Northern Ireland) 1964	1964 c. 22 (N.I.)	7 July 1964
Law Reform (Husband and Wife) Act (Northern Ireland) 1964	1964 c. 23 (N.I.)	7 July 1964
An Act to amend the law as to actions in tort between husband and wife; to extend the powers of the court under section 17 of the Married Women's Property Act 1882; (Note: Married Women's Property Act 1882 (45 & 46 Vict. c. 75)) to make provision with respect to certain contracts of insurance and other contracts for the benefit of a spouse or child and with respect to criminal proceedings by or against a spouse; and for purposes connected with matters aforesaid.
Finance Act (Northern Ireland) 1964	1964 c. 24 (N.I.)	7 July 1964
An Act to amend the law relating to stamp duties; to abolish the television advertisement duty; to amend the law relating to certain excise duties (including duties on mechanically-propelled vehicles and pool betting duty); and to make further provision in connection with finance.
Pig Production Development Act (Northern Ireland) 1964 (repealed)	1964 c. 25 (N.I.)	7 July 1964
An Act to establish a Pig Production Development Committee and a Pig Production Development Fund; to make provision with respect to services and facilities intended to benefit persons engaged in the production of pigs or to increase, encourage or make more profitable the production of pigs or to secure improvements in the quality of pigs; for the purpose of meeting costs incurred in connection with the provision of services and facilities as aforesaid, to provide for the imposition and payment by certain persons of a levy in respect of pigs sold to the Pigs Marketing Board, in respect of certain pigs sold to other persons and in respect of pigs exported from Northern Ireland; and for purposes connected with those matters. (Repealed by Public Authorities (Reform) Act (Northern Ireland) 2009 (c. 3 (N.I.)))
Housing (Miscellaneous Provisions) Act (Northern Ireland) 1964	1964 c. 26 (N.I.)	13 October 1964
An Act to amend and extend certain enactments relating to housing (including housing on farms), and for purposes connected therewith.
Private Streets Act (Northern Ireland) 1964	1964 c. 27 (N.I.)	13 October 1964
An Act to consolidate the Public Health Acts (Northern Ireland) 1890 to 1962 and certain other enactments relating to private streets in Northern Ireland; and to make new provision for the matters to which the said enactments relate.
Petroleum (Production) Act (Northern Ireland) 1964	1964 c. 28 (N.I.)	13 October 1964
An Act to vest in the Ministry of Commerce the property in undeveloped petroleum in Northern Ireland; to make provision with respect to searching and boring for and getting petroleum; and for purposes connected with the matters aforesaid.
Lands Tribunal and Compensation Act (Northern Ireland) 1964	1964 c. 29 (N.I.)	20 October 1964
An Act to establish a Lands Tribunal to determine certain questions relating to compensation for the compulsory acquisition of land and to other matters including appeals against valuations for rating purposes; to amend the Acquisition of Land (Assessment of Compensation) Act 1919; (Note: Acquisition of Land (Assessment of Compensation) Act 1919 (9 & 10 Geo. 5. c. 57)) to make further provision with respect to the assessment and payment of compensation in respect of the compulsory acquisition of land or depreciation in the value of land; and for purposes connected with any of those matters.
County Courts (Amendment) Act (Northern Ireland) 1964	1964 c. 30 (N.I.)	20 October 1964
Drainage Act (Northern Ireland) 1964 (repealed)	1964 c. 31 (N.I.)	20 October 1964
(Repealed by Drainage (Northern Ireland) Order 1973 (SI 1973/69)
Preferential Payments (Bankruptcies and Arrangements) Act (Northern Ireland) 1964	1964 c. 32 (N.I.)	20 October 1964
Charities Act (Northern Ireland) 1964 (repealed)	1964 c. 33 (N.I.)	20 October 1964
An Act to replace, with new provisions, certain existing enactments relating to charities; to make further provision with respect to gifts to charity and gifts for mixed charitable and non-charitable purposes; and for purposes connected with those matters. (Repealed by Charities Act (Northern Ireland) 2008 (c. 12 (N.I.)))
Emergency Powers (Amendment) Act (Northern Ireland) 1964 (repealed)	1964 c. 34 (N.I.)	17 December 1964
An Act to amend the Emergency Powers Act (Northern Ireland) 1926. (Note: Emergency Powers Act (Northern Ireland) 1926 (16 & 17 Geo. 5. c. 8 (N.I.))) (Repealed by Civil Contingencies Act 2004 (c. 36))
Expiring Laws Continuance Act (Northern Ireland) 1964	1964 c. 35 (N.I.)	17 December 1964
Business Tenancies Act (Northern Ireland) 1964 (repealed)	1964 c. 36 (N.I.)	17 December 1964
An Act to provide security of tenure for certain tenants occupying premises for business, professional or certain other purposes by enabling them to obtain new tenancies in certain cases or in certain circumstances to obtain compensation; to make provision for the payment of compensation in respect of certain improvements to such premises; and for purposes connected therewith. (Repealed by Business Tenancies (Northern Ireland) Order 1996 (SI 1996/725))
National Insurance &c. Act (Northern Ireland) 1964	1964 c. 37 (N.I.)	17 December 1964

== 1965 ==
=== Public acts ===
Short title, or popular name	Citation	Royal assent
Long title
Consolidated Fund Act (Northern Ireland) 1965	1965 c. 1 (N.I.)	2 February 1965
Trade Union (Amalgamations, etc.) Act (Northern Ireland) 1965	1965 c. 2 (N.I.)	16 February 1965
Agriculture (Miscellaneous Provisions) Act (Northern Ireland) 1965	1965 c. 3 (N.I.)	2 March 1965
An Act to make further provision with respect to licences for wholesale dealing in and permits for the export of poultry, the cold and chemical storage of eggs, the fees for licences for wholesale dealing in eggs, returns as to agricultural land, agricultural development loans and the manufacture of dairy ice-cream; to amend the Diseases of Animals Act (Northern Ireland) 1958; (Note: Diseases of Animals Act (Northern Ireland) 1958 (c. 13 (N.I.))) to extend the regulation of the sending of meat, bacon and dead rabbits out of Northern Ireland; to prohibit the sale or sending out of Northern Ireland of horned cattle; and for purposes connected with the matters aforesaid.
Museum (Amendment) Act (Northern Ireland) 1965	1965 c. 4 (N.I.)	16 March 1965
Census Act (Northern Ireland) 1965	1965 c. 5 (N.I.)	23 March 1965
Trading Stamps Act (Northern Ireland) 1965 (repealed)	1965 c. 6 (N.I.)	23 March 1965
An Act to make provision with respect to trading stamps, including provision for regulating the issue, use and redemption of trading stamps; to provide for regulating the business of issuing and redeeming trading stamps; and for purposes connected with the matters aforesaid. (Repealed by Law Reform (Miscellaneous Provisions) (Northern Ireland) Order 2005 (SI 2005/1452))
Aid to Aircraft Industry (Amendment)	1965 c. 7 (N.I.)	23 March 1965
Legal Aid and Advice Act (Northern Ireland) 1965	1965 c. 8 (N.I.)	31 March 1965
Consolidated Fund (No. 2) Act (Northern Ireland) 1965	1965 c. 9 (N.I.)	31 March 1965
Amenity Lands Act (Northern Ireland) 1965	1965 c. 10 (N.I.)	31 March 1965
Driving of Invalid Carriages Act (Northern Ireland) 1965	1965 c. 11 (N.I.)	31 March 1965
Administrative and Financial Provisions Act (Northern Ireland) 1965	1965 c. 12 (N.I.)	13 April 1965
An Act to authorise increases in certain charges upon the Consolidated Fund; to increase the limits on the aggregate of certain grants for hotels, guest houses and boarding houses, on the aggregate of the sums which may be issued by way of Government Loans and on the amounts of certain pensions and gratuities which may be granted for meritorious public services; to make further provision with respect to the declarations required to be subscribed before payments are made for certain civil or police non-effective services; to make provision for future increases in the salary of the Comptroller and Auditor-General; to authorise the payment to the holders of Ministerial offices and to the Attorney-General of gratuities and allowances in respect of injuries incurred or diseases contracted in the discharge of their duties; to substitute the payment of fees for the payment of stamp duty in respect of certain certificates of registration issued by the Northern Ireland Tourist Board; to amend section 16 of the Administrative and Financial Provisions Act (Northern Ireland) 1962; (Note: Administrative and Financial Provisions Act (Northern Ireland) 1962 (c. 7 (N.I.))) to amend references in certain enactments to section 2(2) of the Northern Ireland (Miscellaneous Provisions) Act 1928; (Note: Northern Ireland (Miscellaneous Provisions) Act 1928 (18 & 19 Geo. 5. c. 24)) and for purposes connected with any of those matters.
New Towns Act (Northern Ireland) 1965	1965 c. 13 (N.I.)	24 June 1965
An Act to make provision for the creation of new towns, for the exercise by new town commissions of certain functions in relation to such towns, for the expansion or development of existing towns, and for purposes related to those matters.
Consumer Protection Act (Northern Ireland) 1965	1965 c. 14 (N.I.)	8 July 1965
Criminal Evidence Act (Northern Ireland) 1965	1965 c. 15 (N.I.)	8 July 1965
Finance Act (Northern Ireland) 1965	1965 c. 16 (N.I.)	8 July 1965
An Act to amend the law relating to estate duty, stamp duties and excise duties on mechanically-propelled vehicles, and to make further provision in connection with finance.
Appropriation Act (Northern Ireland) 1965	1965 c. 17 (N.I.)	8 July 1965
Ministerial Salaries and Members' Pensions Act (Northern Ireland) 1965 (repealed)	1965 c. 18 (N.I.)	19 October 1965
An Act to amend enactments relating to the salaries payable to the Speaker of the Senate, the Speaker of the House of Commons, the holders of Ministerial offices and the Attorney General; to establish a contributory pensions scheme for Members of the House of Commons; to provide for the payment of pensions to persons who have been Prime Minister; to amend the Ministerial Offices [...] (Repealed by Northern Ireland Act 1998 (c. 47)
Contracts of Employment and Redundancy Payments Act (Northern Ireland) 1965	1965 c. 19 (N.I.)	19 October 1965
Factories Act (Northern Ireland) 1965	1965 c. 20 (N.I.)	4 November 1965
An Act to consolidate the Factories Acts (Northern Ireland) 1938 to 1959, and certain other enactments relating to the safety, health and welfare of employed persons.
Slaughter-Houses Act (Northern Ireland) 1965	1965 c. 21 (N.I.)	4 November 1965
Seeds Act (Northern Ireland) 1965	1965 c. 22 (N.I.)	4 November 1965
An Act to confer power to regulate, and to amend in other respects the law relating to, transactions in seeds and seed potatoes; to make further provision for the testing of seeds and seed potatoes; and for connected purposes.
Land Development Values (Compensation) Act (Northern Ireland) 1965	1965 c. 23 (N.I.)	4 November 1965
An Act to make fresh provision in relation to the payment of compensation in respect of planning decisions and orders revoking or modifying the grant of planning permission; to authorise the recovery of planning compensation on the initiation of certain subsequent development; to make further provision in relation to applications for planning permission; and for purposes connected with those matters.

=== Public acts ===
Short title, or popular name	Citation	Royal assent
Long title
Foyle College (Amendment) Act (Northern Ireland) 1965 (repealed)	1965 c. i (N.I.)	8 July 1965
(Repealed by Foyle and Londonderry College Act 1976 (c. xviii)

== 1966 ==
=== Public acts ===
Short title, or popular name	Citation	Royal assent
Long title
Rating and Valuation (Amendment) Act (Northern Ireland) 1966	1966 c. 1 (N.I.)	1 March 1966
Perpetuities Act (Northern Ireland) 1966	1966 c. 2 (N.I.)	24 March 1966
An Act to amend the law relating to the avoidance of future interests in property on grounds of remoteness and certain matters connected therewith.
Transport Act (Northern Ireland) 1966 (repealed)	1966 c. 3 (N.I.)	24 March 1966
An Act to establish a system of licensing for the use of motor vehicles to carry goods for reward; to relieve the Ulster Transport Authority of any duty to provide a transport service for the carriage of goods by road or rail; to alter the jurisdiction of the Transport Tribunal; to increase the amount of certain grants payable to the Ulster Transport Authority; and otherwise to amend the law relating to transport. (Repealed by Statute Law Revision (Northern Ireland) Act 1973 (c. 55)
New Universities (Acquisition of Land) Act (Northern Ireland) 1966	1966 c. 4 (N.I.)	24 March 1966
An Act to authorise local authorities to assist in the establishment of new universities by acquiring land for presentation to such universities, and by making payments towards the expenditure incurred in such acquisitions; and for connected purposes.
Pensions (Increase) Act (Northern Ireland) 1966	1966 c. 5 (N.I.)	24 March 1966
National Insurance Act (Northern Ireland) 1966	1966 c. 6 (N.I.)	24 March 1966
An Act to consolidate the National Insurance Acts (Northern Ireland) 1946 to 1964, certain provisions made by regulations thereunder and certain related enactments.
Health Service Contributions Act (Northern Ireland) 1966 (repealed)	1966 c. 7 (N.I.)	24 March 1966
(Repealed by Social Security Act 1973 (c. 38))
Family Allowances Act (Northern Ireland) 1966	1966 c. 8 (N.I.)	24 March 1966
National Insurance (Industrial Injuries) Act (Northern Ireland) 1966	1966 c. 9 (N.I.)	24 March 1966
An Act to consolidate the National Insurance (Industrial Injuries) Acts (Northern Ireland) 1946 to 1964 and certain related enactments.
Statute Law Revision (Consequential Repeals) Act (Northern Ireland) 1966 (repealed)	1966 c. 10 (N.I.)	
(Repealed by Statute Law Revision (Northern Ireland) Act 1973 (c. 55)
Roads (Liability of Road Authorities for Neglect) Act (Northern Ireland) 1966	1966 c. 11 (N.I.)	24 March 1966
An Act to impose a duty on highway authorities to maintain highways, to provide for the recovery of damages in respect of death or personal injury caused by a breach of that duty, and to make provision for other matters relating to highways and their maintenance.
Consolidated Fund Act (Northern Ireland) 1966 (repealed)	1966 c. 12 (N.I.)	24 March 1966
(Repealed by Statute Law Revision (Northern Ireland) Act 1973 (c. 55)
Hire Purchase (Amendment) Act (Northern Ireland) 1966	1966 c. 13 (N.I.)	10 May 1966
Workmen's Compensation (Supplementation) Act (Northern Ireland) 1966	1966 c. 14 (N.I.)	10 May 1966
Horticulture Act (Northern Ireland) 1966	1966 c. 15 (N.I.)	24 May 1966
An Act to make provision with respect to the grading, packing, transporting and processing of horticultural produce; to regulate and control the sending of horticultural produce out of Northern Ireland; and for purposes connected with those matters.
National Insurance (No. 2) Act (Northern Ireland) 1966	1966 c. 16 (N.I.)	24 May 1966
Fisheries Act (Northern Ireland) 1966	1966 c. 17 (N.I.)	21 June 1966
An Act to extend the functions of the Ministry of Agriculture in relation to fisheries and to make provision for the development and improvement of fisheries by, or with the assistance of, that Ministry; to establish the Fisheries Conservancy Board for Northern Ireland, and to define their functions; to provide for the transfer to that Board of the property, rights and liabilities of, and to dissolve, the existing boards of conservators; to consolidate with amendments the Fisheries Acts (Northern Ireland) 1842 to 1954 and certain other enactments relating to fisheries; otherwise to amend the law with respect to fisheries; and for purposes connected with those matters.
Education (Amendment) Act (Northern Ireland) 1966 (repealed)	1966 c. 18 (N.I.)	21 June 1966
An Act to make provision for payments to a local education authority in respect of a college of further education, and to the managers of voluntary schools in respect of redundancy payments made by them; to amend the Education Act (Northern Ireland), 1947, (Note: Education Act (Northern Ireland) 1947 (c. 3 (N.I.))) as to the appointment of teachers in certain county primary and intermediate schools, the making of contributions to the cost of the medical inspection and treatment of certain pupils, the provision of clothing for pupils, safety-measures in relation to pupils, and school leaving dates; to alter references to the areas of local education authorities in relation to the management of certain schools and institutions and for purposes connected with those matters. (Repealed by Education and Libraries (Northern Ireland) Order 1972 (SI 1972/1263)
Appropriation Act (Northern Ireland) 1966 (repealed)	1966 c. 19 (N.I.)	
(Repealed by Statute Law Revision (Northern Ireland) Act 1973 (c. 55)
Criminal Justice Act (Northern Ireland) 1966	1966 c. 20 (N.I.)	7 July 1966
An Act to make certain provision with respect to responsibility for offences and with respect to homicide and suicide; to provide for an appeal to the Court of Criminal Appeal against a verdict of not guilty on the ground of insanity and to empower that Court to order a new trial; and for purposes connected with the matters aforesaid or any of them.
Finance Act (Northern Ireland) 1966	1966 c. 21 (N.I.)	7 July 1966
An Act to amend the law relating to estate duty, stamp duties, excise duties on mechanically-propelled vehicles and certain other excise duties; to impose an excise duty on certain bets and to require, and impose an excise duty on, licences in respect of gaming machines; to provide for the payment of grants to operators of bus services towards the defrayal of customs or excise duty charged on fuel used in operating such services; to provide for the payment of grants to housing associations for affording relief from income tax, profits tax and corporation tax payable by such associations; and to make further provision in connection with finance.
Capital Grants to Industry (Amendment) Act (Northern Ireland) 1966	1966 c. 22 (N.I.)	7 July 1966
Diseases of Animals (Amendment) Act (Northern Ireland) 1966	1966 c. 23 (N.I.)	7 July 1966
Registration of Clubs Act (Northern Ireland) 1966	1966 c. 24 (N.I.)	7 July 1966
Selective Employment Refunds (Records etc.) Act (Northern Ireland) 1966	1966 c. 25 (N.I.)	7 July 1966
Office and Shop Premises Act (Northern Ireland) 1966 (repealed)	1966 c. 26 (N.I.)	7 July 1966
An Act to make provision for securing the health, safety and welfare of persons employed to work in office or shop premises; and for connected purposes. (Repealed by Health and Safety at Work (Northern Ireland) Order 1978 (SI 1978/1039))
Superannuation (Amendment) Act (Northern Ireland) 1966	1966 c. 27 (N.I.)	7 July 1966
An Act to amend the law relating to superannuation and other benefits payable to or in respect of civil servants and relating to such benefits payable to or in respect of persons employed in more than one public office; to amend the provisions of the Judicial Pensions Act (Northern Ireland) 1951, (Note: Judicial Pensions Act (Northern Ireland) 1951 (c. 20 (N.I.))) the County Courts Act (Northern Ireland) 1959 (Note: County Courts Act (Northern Ireland) 1959 (c. 25 (N.I.))) and the Resident Magistrates' Pensions Act (Northern Ireland) 1960 (Note: Resident Magistrates' Pensions Act (Northern Ireland) 1960 (c. 2 (N.I.))) relating to pensions payable to children; to apply certain provisions of the Superannuation Act (Northern Ireland) 1949 (Note: Superannuation Act (Northern Ireland) 1949 (c. 13 (N.I.))) to clerks of the Crown and peace; and for purposes connected with the matters aforesaid.
Supplementary Benefits &c. Act (Northern Ireland) 1966	1966 c. 28 (N.I.)	9 August 1966
Matrimonial Causes (Reports) Act (Northern Ireland) 1966	1966 c. 29 (N.I.)	3 November 1966
An Act to regulate the publication of reports of certain classes of judicial proceedings.
Shipbuilding Industry (Loans) Act (Northern Ireland) 1966	1966 c. 30 (N.I.)	3 November 1966
Inalienable Lands Act (Northern Ireland) 1966 (repealed)	1966 c. 31 (N.I.)	3 November 1966
An Act to authorise the acquisition of land for certain purposes notwithstanding any enactment (including a local or private Act) providing that the land shall be inalienable and to make provision for the disposal of such land by charities; and for purposes connected therewith. (Repealed by Water and Sewerage Services (Northern Ireland) Order 2006 (SI 2006/3336)
Selective Employment Payments Act (Northern Ireland) 1966	1966 c. 32 (N.I.)	15 November 1966
Electricity (Borrowing Powers) Act (Northern Ireland) 1966	1966 c. 33 (N.I.)	3 November 1966
Tourist Traffic (Amendment) Act (Northern Ireland) 1966	1966 c. 34 (N.I.)	15 November 1966
Maintenance and Affiliation Orders Act (Northern Ireland) 1966	1966 c. 35 (N.I.)	15 November 1966
An Act to remove restrictions on certain orders which may be made by courts of summary jurisdiction; to extend the periods for which payments may be continued under certain orders; to extend the powers of courts to make orders in respect of children in connection with certain proceedings; to make provision for the registration in the High Court or a court of summary jurisdiction of maintenance and affiliation orders and with respect to the enforcement and variation of orders so registered; and otherwise to make further provision with respect to certain orders; and for purposes connected with the matters aforesaid.
Industries Development Act (Northern Ireland) 1966	1966 c. 36 (N.I.)	22 November 1966
Appropriation (No. 2) Act (Northern Ireland) 1966	1966 c. 37 (N.I.)	22 November 1966
Local Government Act (Northern Ireland) 1966	1966 c. 38 (N.I.)	22 November 1966
An Act to make further provision respecting local government areas and functions, including provision with regard to rating, water supplies and sewerage, the purchase and appropriation of land for local government purposes, and provision regarding local government contracts and superannuation; to amend the law with respect to the payment of certain grants by and to local authorities and with respect to certain matters of local government administration; to amend section 34 of and Schedule 4 to the New Towns Act (Northern Ireland) 1965; (Note: New Towns Act (Northern Ireland) 1965 (c. 13 (N.I.))) and for purposes connected with the matters aforesaid.
Expiring Laws Continuance Act (Northern Ireland) 1966 (repealed)	1966 c. 39 (N.I.)	6 December 1966
(Repealed by Statute Law Revision (Northern Ireland) Act 1973 (c. 55)
Agricultural Loans Act (Northern Ireland) 1966	1966 c. 40 (N.I.)	6 December 1966
Industrial Investment (General Assistance) Act (Northern Ireland) 1966	1966 c. 41 (N.I.)	6 December 1966
Hire-Purchase Act (Northern Ireland) 1966	1966 c. 42 (N.I.)	6 December 1966
An Act to consolidate certain enactments relating to hire-purchase, credit-sale and conditional sale agreements, to information to be included in advertisements displayed or issued in connection with hire-purchase or credit-sale and to dispositions of motor vehicles which have been let or agreed to be sold by way of hire-purchase or conditional sale.
Agricultural Trust Act (Northern Ireland) 1966	1966 c. 43 (N.I.)	6 December 1966

=== Local acts ===
Short title, or popular name	Citation	Royal assent
Long title
The Institute of Chartered Accountants in Ireland (Charter Amendment) Act (Northern Ireland) 1966	1966 c. i (N.I.)	21 June 1966
Ministry of Development Provisional Order Confirmation (Bangor Borough Extension) Act (Northern Ireland) 1966	1966 c. ii (N.I.)	6 December 1966

== 1967 ==
=== Public acts ===
{{Act-Row
(Repealed by Statute Law Revision (Northern Ireland) Act 1980 (c. 59) |shorttitle = Health Services (Amendment) Act (Northern Ireland) 1967 |citation = 1967 c. 9 (N.I.) |royalassent = 23 May 1967 |longtitle =
(Repealed by Mental Health (Northern Ireland) Order 1986 (SI 1986/595) }}

Short title, or popular name	Citation	Royal assent
Long title
Financial Provisions Act (Northern Ireland) 1967	1967 c. 1 (N.I.)	28 February 1967
Local Government Finance Act (Northern Ireland) 1967	1967 c. 2 (N.I.)	28 February 1967
Teachers Superannuation (Amendment) Act (Northern Ireland) 1967 (repealed)	1967 c. 3 (N.I.)	21 March 1967
(Repealed by Superannuation (Northern Ireland) Order 1972 (SI 1972/1073)
Consolidated Fund Act (Northern Ireland) 1967	1967 c. 4 (N.I.)	21 March 1967
Administration of Estates (Small Payments) Act (Northern Ireland) 1967	1967 c. 5 (N.I.)	21 March 1967
An Act to provide for increasing the limits in transferred provisions which allow property to be disposed of on death without probate or other proof of title, or in pursuance of a nomination made by the deceased; to extend certain of the said provisions relating to an intestate's property to cases where the deceased leaves a will; and for connected purposes.
Weights and Measures Act (Northern Ireland) 1967	1967 c. 6 (N.I.)	25 April 1967
An Act to make amended provision with respect to weights and measures and for connected purposes.
Diseases of Fish Act (Northern Ireland) 1967 (repealed)	1967 c. 7 (N.I.)	23 May 1967
An Act to make provision respecting diseases of fish. (Repealed by Aquatic Animal Health Regulations (Northern Ireland) 2009 (SR(NI) 2009/129))
Fishing Vessels (Grants) Act (Northern Ireland) 1967	1967 c. 8 (N.I.)	23 May 1967
An Act to make provision for financial aid towards expenditure in relation to fishing vessels and for purposes connected therewith.
Industrial Advice and Enterprise (Amendment) Act (Northern Ireland) 1967 (repealed)	1967 c. 10 (N.I.)	6 June 1967
(Repealed by Statute Law Revision (Northern Ireland) Act 1980 (c. 59)
Electricity (Supply) Act (Northern Ireland) 1967 (repealed)	1967 c. 11 (N.I.)	6 June 1967
(Repealed by Electricity Supply (Northern Ireland) Order 1972 (SI 1972/1072)
Pharmacy Act (Northern Ireland) 1967	1967 c. 12 (N.I.)	27 June 1967
Ulster Folk Museum (Amendment) Act (Northern Ireland) 1967	1967 c. 13 (N.I.)	27 June 1967
Misrepresentation Act (Northern Ireland) 1967	1967 c. 14 (N.I.)	27 June 1967
An Act to amend the law relating to innocent misrepresentations and to amend sections 11 and 35 of the Sale of Goods Act 1893. (Note: Sale of Goods Act 1893 (56 & 57 Vict. c. 71))
Agriculture (Miscellaneous Provisions) Act (Northern Ireland) 1967	1967 c. 15 (N.I.)	27 June 1967
An Act to amend the law with respect to the valuation of agricultural property for the purposes of rates; to amend or repeal certain enactments relating to live stock breeding, agricultural workers' wages and holidays, scutch mills and flax, the production and sale of milk and milk products, the marketing of agricultural produce and the drainage of land; and for purposes connected with certain of the matters aforesaid.
Capital Grants to Industry Act (Northern Ireland) 1967 (repealed)	1967 c. 16 (N.I.)	6 July 1967
(Repealed by Statute Law Revision (Northern Ireland) Act 1980 (c. 59)
Road Races (Amendment) Act (Northern Ireland) 1967 (repealed)	1967 c. 17 (N.I.)	6 July 1967
(Repealed by Road Races (Northern Ireland) Order 1977 (SI 1977/2155)
Criminal Law Act (Northern Ireland) 1967	1967 c. 18 (N.I.)	1 August 1967
An Act to abolish the division of crimes into felonies and misdemeanours, to amend and simplify the law in respect of matters arising from or related to that division or the abolition of it, to make further provision with respect to criminal proceedings and offences; and for purposes connected with any of those matters.
Appropriation Act (Northern Ireland) 1967	1967 c. 19 (N.I.)	6 July 1967
Finance Act (Northern Ireland) 1967	1967 c. 20 (N.I.)	1 August 1967
An Act to amend the law relating to estate duty, stamp duties and excise duties on mechanically-propelled vehicles; to abolish mineral rights duties, certain excise licences for the sale of intoxicating liquor by retail and excise licences authorising the supply of intoxicating liquor in the premises of registered clubs and to make further provision consequential on the abolition of those licences; to provide for relief from selective employment tax by way of payments to certain employers; to increase the grants payable to operators of bus services towards the defrayal of customs and excise duty charged on fuel used in operating such services; to make further provision with respect to sums recoverable under section 26 of the Supplementary Benefits &c. Act (Northern Ireland) 1966 (Note: Supplementary Benefits &c. Act (Northern Ireland) 1966 (c. 28 (N.I.))) by the Ministry of Health and Social Services; and to make further provision in connection with finance.
Livestock Marketing Commission Act (Northern Ireland) 1967	1967 c. 21 (N.I.)	1 August 1967
An Act to establish a Livestock Marketing Commission for the benefit of the livestock and livestock products industries in Northern Ireland.
National Insurance Act (Northern Ireland) 1967	1967 c. 22 (N.I.)	1 August 1967
Selective Employment Payments (Amendment) Act (Northern Ireland) 1967	1967 c. 23 (N.I.)	1 August 1967
Superannuation Act (Northern Ireland) 1967	1967 c. 24 (N.I.)	28 November 1967
An Act to consolidate the Superannuation Acts (Northern Ireland) 1921 to 1966, the enactments thereby applied to the civil service of Northern Ireland and certain other enactments relating to the superannuation of civil servants and other persons employed in the civil service of Northern Ireland.
Births and Deaths Registration Act (Northern Ireland) 1967	1967 c. 25 (N.I.)	28 November 1967
Appropriation (No. 2) Act (Northern Ireland) 1967	1967 c. 26 (N.I.)	28 November 1967
Registration of Clubs Act (Northern Ireland) 1967 (repealed)	1967 c. 27 (N.I.)	14 December 1967
(Repealed by Registration of Clubs (Northern Ireland) Order 1987 (SI 1987/1278))
Plant Health Act (Northern Ireland) 1967	1967 c. 28 (N.I.)	14 December 1967
An Act to consolidate the Destructive Insects and Pests Acts (Northern Ireland) 1877 to 1934.
Increase of Fines Act (Northern Ireland) 1967	1967 c. 29 (N.I.)	14 December 1967
An Act to provide for the increase and varying of certain pecuniary penalties and for matters connected therewith.
Registration of Deeds (Amendment) Act (Northern Ireland) 1967	1967 c. 30 (N.I.)	14 December 1967
Building Societies Act (Northern Ireland) 1967	1967 c. 31 (N.I.)	14 December 1967
Marriage (Registration of Buildings) Act (Northern Ireland) 1967 (repealed)	1967 c. 32 (N.I.)	14 December 1967
(Repealed by Marriage (Northern Ireland) Order 2003 (SI 2003/413)
Expiring Laws Continuance Act (Northern Ireland) 1967 (repealed)	1967 c. 33 (N.I.)	14 December 1967
(Repealed by Statute Law Revision (Northern Ireland) Act 1976 (c. 12)
Housing Act (Northern Ireland) 1967	1967 c. 34 (N.I.)	14 December 1967
Adoption Act (Northern Ireland) 1967	1967 c. 35 (N.I.)	14 December 1967
An Act to consolidate with amendments the enactments relating to the adoption of infants; to extend the power of the court to make adoption orders; to provide further for the protection of infants awaiting adoption; to provide for effect to be given to certain adoption orders made outside Northern Ireland; to facilitate the proof of adoption orders made in different parts of the United Kingdom; and for purposes connected with the matters aforesaid.
Public Health Act (Northern Ireland) 1967	1967 c. 36 (N.I.)	14 December 1967
An Act to consolidate with amendments the enactments relating to the notification and prevention of certain infectious diseases and to amend certain enactments relating to public health.
Transport Act (Northern Ireland) 1967	1967 c. 37 (N.I.)	14 December 1967
An Act to make further provision for the re-organisation of public transport and otherwise to amend the law relating to transport; and for purposes connected therewith.
Road Traffic Act (Northern Ireland) 1967	1967 c. 38 (N.I.)	14 December 1967

=== Local acts ===
Short title, or popular name	Citation	Royal assent
Long title
Belfast Harbour Act (Northern Ireland) 1967	1967 c. i (N.I.)	27 June 1967
Down County Council (Strangford Lough Ferry) Act (Northern Ireland) 1967 (repealed)	1967 c. ii (N.I.)	14 December 1967
An Act to authorise the County Council of the County of Down to provide and maintain a ferry across Strangford Lough between the townlands of Portaferry and Strangford and to make provision with respect to the taking of tolls for the use of the said ferry. (Repealed by Roads (Northern Ireland) Order 1993 (SI 1993/3160))

== 1968 ==
Short title, or popular name	Citation	Royal assent
Long title
Family Allowances and National Insurance Act (Northern Ireland) 1968	1968 c. 1 (N.I.)	22 February 1968
An Act to increase family allowances under the Family Allowances Act (Northern Ireland) 1966 (Note: Family Allowances Act (Northern Ireland) 1966 (c. 8 (N.I.))) and make related adjustments of certain benefits under the National Insurance Act (Northern Ireland) 1966 (Note: National Insurance Act (Northern Ireland) 1966 (c. 6 (N.I.))) or the National Insurance (Industrial Injuries) Act (Northern Ireland) 1966, (Note: National Insurance (Industrial Injuries) Act (Northern Ireland) 1966 (c. 9 (N.I.))) to make further provision as to the time at which a person ceases to be a child within the meaning of those Acts, and for purposes connected therewith.
Education (Amendment) Act (Northern Ireland) 1968 (repealed)	1968 c. 2 (N.I.)	26 March 1968
(Repealed by Education and Libraries (Northern Ireland) Order 1972 (SI 1972/1263)
Consolidated Fund Act (Northern Ireland) 1968	1968 c. 3 (N.I.)	26 March 1968
Business Tenancies (Amendment) Act (Northern Ireland) 1968 (repealed)	1968 c. 4 (N.I.)	26 March 1968
(Repealed by Business Tenancies (Northern Ireland) Order 1996 (SI 1996/725))
Wild Birds Protection Act (Northern Ireland) 1968	1968 c. 5 (N.I.)	26 March 1968
Insurance Companies Act (Northern Ireland) 1968	1968 c. 6 (N.I.)	4 April 1968
An Act to amend and consolidate the Assurance Companies Acts (Northern Ireland) 1909 to 1947 and otherwise to amend the law relating to insurance companies and to the carrying on of insurance business.
Malone and Whiteabbey Training Schools Act (Northern Ireland) 1968	1968 c. 7 (N.I.)	4 April 1968
An Act to relieve the Ministry of Home Affairs from an obligation imposed on it under the Malone Training School Act (Northern Ireland) 1926; (Note: Malone Training School Act (Northern Ireland) 1926 (16 & 17 Geo. 5. c. 22 (N.I.))) to change the name of a body established under the Malone and Whiteabbey Training Schools Act (Northern Ireland) 1956 (Note: Malone and Whiteabbey Training Schools Act (Northern Ireland) 1956 (c. 4 (N.I.))) and to alter the membership of that body.
Public Expenditure and Receipts Act (Northern Ireland) 1968	1968 c. 8 (N.I.)	23 April 1968
An Act to increase contributions payable under the National Insurance Act (Northern Ireland) 1966 and the Health Service Contributions Act (Northern Ireland) 1966, and to strengthen the provisions of the former Act as to enforcement; to restrict the enactments providing for the supply of milk to school children; to provide compensation for civil defence employees in connection with the reduction of activities under section 2 or 3 of the Civil Defence Act (Northern Ireland) 1950; (Note: Civil Defence Act (Northern Ireland) 1950 (c. 11 (N.I.))) to provide for increasing, or for abolishing in the interests of economy, certain fees and other payments; and for purposes connected therewith.
Livestock (Protection from Dogs) Act (Northern Ireland) 1968	1968 c. 9 (N.I.)	11 June 1968
Costs in Criminal Cases Act (Northern Ireland) 1968	1968 c. 10 (N.I.)	11 June 1968
An Act to provide for the payment of costs in certain criminal proceedings; to repeal certain obsolete or unnecessary enactments; and for matters connected therewith.
Criminal Injuries to Persons (Compensation) Act (Northern Ireland) 1968	1968 c. 11 (N.I.)	11 June 1968
Poultry Improvement Act (Northern Ireland) 1968	1968 c. 12 (N.I.)	11 June 1968
An Act to enable provision to be made for the assistance or improvement of the poultry industry; to secure improvements in the produce of establishments for the breeding, hatching or rearing of poultry by making fresh provision for the regulation of such establishments; to authorise schemes for the testing of poultry; and for purposes connected with those matters.
Youth Employment Service (Amendment) Act (Northern Ireland) 1968	1968 c. 13 (N.I.)	4 July 1968
Ulster College Act (Northern Ireland) 1968	1968 c. 14 (N.I.)	4 July 1968
Appropriation Act (Northern Ireland) 1968	1968 c. 15 (N.I.)	4 July 1968
Family Allowances and National Insurance (No. 2) Act (Northern Ireland) 1968	1968 c. 16 (N.I.)	4 July 1968
Finance Act (Northern Ireland) 1968	1968 c. 17 (N.I.)	4 July 1968
An Act to amend the law relating to estate duty, stamp duty and certain duties of excise (including excise duties on mechanically-propelled vehicles and on pool and general betting); to provide for relief from selective employment tax by way of further and increased payments to certain employers; to confirm and give effect to an agreement between the Ministry of Finance and the Treasury of the United Kingdom relating to certain social and allied services; and to make further provision in connection with finance.
Tourist Traffic (Amendment) Act (Northern Ireland) 1968	1968 c. 18 (N.I.)	4 July 1968
Road Traffic Act (Northern Ireland) 1968	1968 c. 19 (N.I.)	24 September 1968
Electoral Law Act (Northern Ireland) 1968	1968 c. 20 (N.I.)	28 November 1968
An Act to abolish the university constituency for the purposes of elections to the Parliament of Northern Ireland; to create four new constituencies and alter the areas of other constituencies; to abolish the occupation of business premises as a qualification for electors at such elections; to enable the age at which persons qualify to be registered as parliamentary electors to be altered; to establish a permanent Boundary Commission and to provide for the review of the distribution of seats at such elections; and for purposes connected with the matters aforesaid or any of them.
Development Loans (Agriculture and Fisheries) Act (Northern Ireland) 1968 (repealed)	1968 c. 21 (N.I.)	28 November 1968
An Act to consolidate the enactments relating to Government loans for agricultural and fishery development. (Repealed by Financial Provisions Act (Northern Ireland) 2014 (c. 6 (N.I.)))
Appropriation (No. 2) Act (Northern Ireland) 1968	1968 c. 22 (N.I.)	28 November 1968
Expiring Laws Continuance Act (Northern Ireland) 1968 (repealed)	1968 c. 23 (N.I.)	
(Repealed by Statute Law Revision (Northern Ireland) Act 1976 (c. 12)
Legislative Procedure Act (Northern Ireland) 1968	1968 c. 24 (N.I.)	12 December 1968
An Act to make further provision with respect to the recital of consents required for the purposes of certain enactments, and with respect to the laying, and the period of laying, of subordinate legislation before Parliament; and for purposes connected therewith.
Financial Provisions Act (Northern Ireland) 1968	1968 c. 25 (N.I.)	12 December 1968
An Act to provide for the variation or abolition of certain fees and other payments; to increase the limits on sums which may be issued out of the Consolidated Fund for certain purposes, on outstanding advances out of that Fund in connection with the Northern Ireland Redundancy Fund and on outstanding Government loans; to authorise the issue of a sum to the Ulster Land Fund; to amend provisions relating to grants in the Fire Services (Amendment) Act (Northern Ireland) 1950 (Note: Fire Services (Amendment) Act (Northern Ireland) 1950 (c. 4 (N.I.))) and provisions relating to advances in the New Towns Act (Northern Ireland) 1965; (Note: New Towns Act (Northern Ireland) 1965 (c. 13 (N.I.))) and for purposes connected with those matters.
Welfare Foods Act (Northern Ireland) 1968	1968 c. 26 (N.I.)	12 December 1968
Firearms (Amendment) Act (Northern Ireland) 1968	1968 c. 27 (N.I.)	12 December 1968
An Act to amend the law relating to the possession and use of firearms, the granting of firearm certificates and permits and the registation of firearms dealers; to provide for the registration of premises occupied by firearms dealers for the purposes of their business, to amend and extend the Firearms Act 1920; and for purposes connected therewith.
Criminal Justice (Miscellaneous Provisions) Act (Northern Ireland) 1968	1968 c. 28 (N.I.)	12 December 1968
An Act to amend the law and practice relating to certain proceedings in criminal courts, including the law relating to evidence in such proceedings; to amend the criminal law in certain respects; to alter the penalties which may be imposed for certain offences; to do away with certain offences together with the torts of maintenance and champerty; to repeal certain obsolete or unnecessary enactments; and for connected purposes.
Treatment of Offenders Act (Northern Ireland) 1968	1968 c. 29 (N.I.)	12 December 1968
An Act to amend the law with respect to the treatment of offenders; and for purposes connected with the matters aforesaid.
Local Government and Roads Act (Northern Ireland) 1968	1968 c. 30 (N.I.)	12 December 1968
An Act to confer on local authorities power to acquire land and to make loans for certain purposes; to confer powers on road authorities; to amend the Roads Act (Northern Ireland) 1948; and for purposes connected with those matters.
Fisheries (Amendment) Act (Northern Ireland) 1968	1968 c. 31 (N.I.)	12 December 1968
An Act to amend the Fisheries Act (Northern Ireland) 1966 (Note: Fisheries Act (Northern Ireland) 1966 (c. 17 (N.I.))) and the Foyle Fisheries Act (Northern Ireland) 1952. (Note: Foyle Fisheries Act (Northern Ireland) 1952 (c. 5 (N.I.)))
Criminal Procedure (Commitment for Trial) Act (Northern Ireland) 1968 or the Criminal Justice (Commitment for Trial) Act (Northern Ireland) 1968	1968 c. 32 (N.I.)	12 December 1968
New Towns (Amendment) Act (Northern Ireland) 1968	1968 c. 33 (N.I.)	12 December 1968
An Act to amend the New Towns Act (Northern Ireland) 1965 and for purposes connected with that matter.
Children and Young Persons Act (Northern Ireland) 1968	1968 c. 34 (N.I.)	12 December 1968
An Act to re-enact with amendments the Children and Young Persons Act (Northern Ireland) 1950, (Note: Children and Young Persons Act (Northern Ireland) 1950 (c. 5 (N.I.))) and for purposes connected with that matter.

== 1969 ==
=== Public acts ===
Short title, or popular name	Citation	Royal assent
Long title
Consolidated Fund Act (Northern Ireland) 1969	1969 c. 1 (N.I.)	27 March 1969
Aircraft Industry (Loans) Act (Northern Ireland) 1969	1969 c. 2 (N.I.)	3 April 1969
National Insurance &c. Act (Northern Ireland) 1969 (repealed)	1969 c. 3 (N.I.)	3 April 1969
(Repealed by Social Security Act 1973 (c. 38))
Redundancy Rebates Act (Northern Ireland) 1969	1969 c. 4 (N.I.)	3 April 1969
An Act to provide for the making of rebates to employers in respect of redundancy payments; and to make further provision with respect to redundancy payments.
Pensions (Increase) Act (Northern Ireland) 1969	1969 c. 5 (N.I.)	3 June 1969
An Act to provide for the increase of certain pensions and other benefits in Northern Ireland.
Mines Act (Northern Ireland) 1969	1969 c. 6 (N.I.)	24 June 1969
An Act to make fresh provision with respect to the management and control of mines and for securing the safety, health and welfare of persons employed thereat; to regulate the employment thereat of women and of young persons and certain other persons under the age of twenty-one years; to enable certain tips to be regulated and to require the fencing of abandoned and disused mines; to amend the Quarries Act (Northern Ireland) 1927; (Note: Quarries Act (Northern Ireland) 1927 (17 & 18 Geo. 5. c. 19 (N.I.))) and for purposes connected with the matters aforesaid.
Superannuation (Miscellaneous Provisions) Act (Northern Ireland) 1969	1969 c. 7 (N.I.)	24 June 1969
An Act to amend the law relating to the superannuation and other benefits payable to or in respect of persons who have held certain offices or have been in certain employment; and for purposes in connection with that matter.
Census Act (Northern Ireland) 1969	1969 c. 8 (N.I.)	24 June 1969
An Act to make provision for the taking from time to time of a census for Northern Ireland and for otherwise collecting statistical information.
Livestock Marketing Commission (Amendment) Act (Northern Ireland) 1969	1969 c. 9 (N.I.)	24 June 1969
An Act to amend the Livestock Marketing Commission Act (Northern Ireland) 1967. (Note: Livestock Marketing Commission Act (Northern Ireland) 1967 (c. 21 (N.I.)))
Parliamentary Commissioner Act (Northern Ireland) 1969	1969 c. 10 (N.I.)	24 June 1969
An Act to make provision for the appointment and functions of a Parliamentary Commissioner for the investigation of administrative action taken on behalf of the Crown in right of Her Majesty's Government in Northern Ireland, and for purposes connected therewith.
Mr. Speaker Stronge's Retirement Act (Northern Ireland) 1969	1969 c. 11 (N.I.)	3 July 1969
An Act to make provision for the retirement of Mr. Speaker Stronge, and for purposes connected therewith.
Firearms Act (Northern Ireland) 1969	1969 c. 12 (N.I.)	10 July 1969
Fire Services Act (Northern Ireland) 1969	1969 c. 13 (N.I.)	3 July 1969
Motor Vehicles and Refuse (Disposal) Act (Northern Ireland) 1969	1969 c. 14 (N.I.)	10 July 1969
Grand Jury (Abolition) Act (Northern Ireland) 1969	1969 c. 15 (N.I.)	31 July 1969
An Act to abolish grand juries and make provision as to the presentment of indictments; and for purposes connected therewith.
Theft Act (Northern Ireland) 1969	1969 c. 16 (N.I.)	10 July 1969
An Act to revise the law of Northern Ireland as to theft and similar or associated offences; and for purposes connected therewith.
Appropriation Act (Northern Ireland) 1969	1969 c. 17 (N.I.)	10 July 1969
Finance Act (Northern Ireland) 1969	1969 c. 18 (N.I.)	31 July 1969
An Act to grant certain duties, to alter other duties, and to amend the law relating to the public revenue and the national debt; and for purposes connected with finance.
National Insurance &c. (No. 2) Act (Northern Ireland) 1969 (repealed)	1969 c. 19 (N.I.)	31 July 1969
An Act to make provision for the purpose of increasing certain rates of national insurance benefits and for purposes connected therewith. (Repealed by Statute Law Revision (Northern Ireland) Act 1980 (c. 59)
Ministry of Community Relations Act (Northern Ireland) 1969	1969 c. 20 (N.I.)	28 October 1969
An Act to establish a Ministry of Community Relations and to define its functions.
Criminal Injuries (Continuance of Temporary Provisions) Act (Northern Ireland) 1969	1969 c. 21 (N.I.)	11 November 1969
An Act to continue for a limited period certain temporary provisions of the Criminal Injuries to Persons (Compensation) Act (Northern Ireland) 1968. (Note: Criminal Injuries to Persons (Compensation) Act (Northern Ireland) 1968 (c. 11 (N.I.)))
Adoption (Hague Convention) Act (Northern Ireland) 1969	1969 c. 22 (N.I.)	11 November 1969
An Act to make provision for extending the powers of the court to make orders with respect to the adoption of children; for enabling effect to be given in Northern Ireland to adoptions effected in other countries and to determinations of authorities in other countries with respect to adoptions; and for purposes connected with the matters aforesaid.
Community Relations Act (Northern Ireland) 1969	1969 c. 23 (N.I.)	11 November 1969
An Act to provide for the appointment and functions of a Commission to foster harmonious relations throughout the community and for purposes connected therewith.
Industrial and Provident Societies Act (Northern Ireland) 1969 or the Co-operative and Community Benefit Societies Act (Northern Ireland) 1969	1969 c. 24 (N.I.)	25 November 1969
An Act to consolidate with amendments the provisions of certain enactments relating to industrial and provident societies and to apply those provisions with modifications to credit unions.
Commissioner for Complaints Act (Northern Ireland) 1969	1969 c. 25 (N.I.)	25 November 1969
An Act to make provision for the appointment and functions of a Commissioner to investigate complaints alleged to arise from administrative acts for which certain local or public bodies are responsible and for purposes connected therewith.
Electoral Law Act (Northern Ireland) 1969	1969 c. 26 (N.I.)	25 November 1969
An Act to extend the local government franchise; to lower the age at which persons may be registered as electors and vote at parliamentary and local government elections; to postpone triennial elections; to alter the years in which registers of parliamentary and local electors are published and in which polling station schemes are prepared; and for purposes connected with the matters aforesaid or any of them.
Moneylenders (Amendment) Act (Northern Ireland) 1969 (repealed)	1969 c. 27 (N.I.)	25 November 1969
An Act to amend the law relating to moneylenders; and for purposes connected with the subject matter of that law. (Repealed by Consumer Credit Act 1974 (c. 39)
Age of Majority Act (Northern Ireland) 1969	1969 c. 28 (N.I.)	3 December 1969
An Act to amend the law relating to the age of majority, to persons who have not attained that age and to the time when a particular age is attained; and for connected purposes.
Protection of the Person and Property Act (Northern Ireland) 1969	1969 c. 29 (N.I.)	3 December 1969
An Act to protect the person and property by penalising certain acts of intimidation and the making or possession or use of certain devices containing an inflammable liquid or substance; to provide for the summary trial of certain offences under the Malicious Damage Act 1861; (Note: Malicious Damage Act 1861 (24 & 25 Vict. c. 97)) and for related purposes.
Judgments (Enforcement) Act (Northern Ireland) 1969	1969 c. 30 (N.I.)	18 December 1969
An Act to make provision for the enforcement of judgments in Northern Ireland.
Appropriation (No. 2) Act (Northern Ireland) 1969	1969 c. 31 (N.I.)	9 December 1969
	1969 c. 32 (N.I.)	
Marketing of Eggs (Amendment) Act (Northern Ireland) 1969	1969 c. 33 (N.I.)	18 December 1969
An Act to make further provision with respect to eggs; and for purposes connected with that matter.
Local Government Act (Northern Ireland) 1969	1969 c. 34 (N.I.)	18 December 1969
Mineral Development Act (Northern Ireland) 1969	1969 c. 35 (N.I.)	18 December 1969
An Act to facilitate the discovery and working of minerals, with certain exceptions, and for connected purposes.
Health Services (Amendment) Act (Northern Ireland) 1969 (repealed)	1969 c. 36 (N.I.)	18 December 1969
(Repealed by Health and Personal Social Services (Northern Ireland) Order 1972 (SI 1972/1265)
Belfast (Kinnegar Works) Act (Northern Ireland) 1969 (repealed)	1969 c. 37 (N.I.)	18 December 1969
An Act to provide for the compulsory acquisition of land at Kinnegar for the purposes of the Belfast Corporation and for purposes connected with that matter. (Repealed by Statute Law Revision (Northern Ireland) Act 1980 (c. 59)
Family Provision Act (Northern Ireland) 1969	1969 c. 38 (N.I.)	18 December 1969
An Act to amend the Administration of Estates Act (Northern Ireland) 1955 (Note: Administration of Estates Act (Northern Ireland) 1955 (c. 24 (N.I.))) and the Inheritance (Family Provision) Act (Northern Ireland) 1960, (Note: Inheritance (Family Provision) Act (Northern Ireland) 1960 (c. 15 (N.I.))) and for purposes connected therewith.
Horse Breeding (Repeal) Act (Northern Ireland) 1969	1969 c. 39 (N.I.)	18 December 1969
An Act to repeal the Horse Breeding Act 1958 (Note: Horse Breeding Act 1958 (6 & 7 Eliz. 2. c. 43)) in its application to Northern Ireland and to abolish the powers of the Ministry of Agriculture to make schemes for the improvement of horse breeding.

=== Local acts ===
Short title, or popular name	Citation	Royal assent
Long title
Governor and Company of the Bank of Ireland and Subsidiaries (Transfer of Business and Accounts) Act (Northern Ireland) 1969 or the Bank of Ireland and Subsidiaries Act 1969	1969 c. i (N.I.)	3 June 1969
An Act to make provision for the transfer to Bank of Ireland (a company incorporated under the Companies Act 1963 (Note: Companies Act 1963 (No. 33 (RoI))) of the Republic of Ireland) of the undertaking of the Governor and Company of the Bank of Ireland; and for other purposes incidental thereto and consequential thereon.

== See also ==
- List of acts of the Northern Ireland Assembly
- List of orders in Council for Northern Ireland

== Sources ==
- The Statute Law Database has the revised statutes of Northern Ireland (incorporating changes made by legislation up to 31 December 2005) and the Acts made since that date.
- The Belfast Gazette: Archive
