= Pawnbrokers Act 1872 =

Act of the Parliament of the United Kingdom

Pawnbrokers Act 1872 (Note: Section 1.)
- Act of Parliament
- Parliament of the United Kingdom
- Long title: An Act for consolidating, with Amendments, the Acts relating to Pawnbrokers in Great Britain.
- Citation: 35 & 36 Vict. c. 93
- Territorial extent: England and Wales; Scotland; (Note: Section 2.)

Dates
- Royal assent: 10 August 1872
- Commencement: 31 December 1872 (Note: Section 3.)
- Repealed: 19 May 1985 (Note: The Consumer Credit Act 1974 (Commencement No. 8) Order 1983 (SI 1983/1551).)
Other legislation
| Amends | See § Repealed enactments |
| Repeals/revokes | See § Repealed enactments |
| Amended by | Children Act 1908; Perjury Act 1911; False Oaths (Scotland) Act 1933; Justices of the Peace Act 1949; Customs and Excise Act 1952; Criminal Law Act 1967 |
| Repealed by | Consumer Credit Act 1974 |

Status: Repealed

Text of statute as originally enacted

The Pawnbrokers Act 1872 (35 & 36 Vict. c. 93) was an act of the Parliament of the United Kingdom that repealed, altered and consolidated all previous legislation relating pawnbroking in Great Britain.

== Provisions ==
Based on an Irish law passed by Parliament, it removed restrictions and reduced the licence fee in London from £15 to the £7 10s paid in the provinces. According to the act (which does not affect loans above £10),

- A pledge is redeemable within one year, with a seven-day grace period.
- Pledges pawned for 10s or less and not redeemed in time become the property of the pawnbroker.
- Pledges above 10s are redeemable until sale, which must be by public auction.
- In addition to one halfpenny for the pawn ticket (sometimes not charged for very small pawns), the pawnbroker is entitled to charge interest one halfpenny per month on every 2s (or part of 2s) lent if the loan is under £2 and on every 2s 6d if the loan is above £2.
- Special contracts may be made for loans over £2, at a rate of interest agreed on between lender and borrower.
- The following are summary offences:
  - Unlawful pawning of goods not the property of the pawner.
  - Taking an article from a person under age twelve or intoxicated.
  - Taking linen, apparel or unfinished goods or materials.
- A new pawnbroker must produce a magistrate's certificate to be licensed.
- A licence cannot be refused if the applicant presents sufficient evidence of good character.
- The word "pawnbroker" must be inscribed in large letters over the shop door.

Provisions in the act safeguard the interests of borrowers whose unredeemed pledges are sold. Sales (by auction) take place only on the first Monday of January, April, July and October, and on the following days if needed.

=== Repealed enactments ===
Section 4 of the act repealed 11 enactments, listed in the first schedule to the act "as far as the same regulate the business of pawnbroking in Great Britain, or otherwise affect Pawnbrokers in Great Britain in relation to loans made by them on pledges pawned with them, and to those pledges, and to the pawning, redemption, and sale thereof, and to transactions and matters connected therewith".

| Citation | Short title | Long title | Extent of repeal |
|---|---|---|---|
| 1 Jas. 1. c. 21 (Note: This is the citation in The Statutes of the Realm) | Act Against Brokers 1603 | An Acte againste Brokers. | The whole act. |
| 25 Geo. 3. c. 48 | Pawnbrokers Act 1785 | An Act for granting to His Majesty certain Stamp Duties on Licences to be taken out by persons using or exercising the trade or business of Pawnbroker. | The whole act. |
| 39 & 40 Geo. 3. c. 99 | Pawnbrokers Act 1800 | An Act for better regulating the business of Pawnbrokers. | The whole act. |
| 55 Geo. 3. c. 184 | Stamp Act 1815 | An Act for repealing the Stamp Duties on deeds, law proceedings, and other written or printed instruments, and the Duties on fire insurances and on legacies and successions to personal estate upon intestacies now payable in Great Britain, and for granting other Duties in lieu thereof. | As far as the Act relates to licences to Pawnbrokers. |
| 9 Geo. 4. c. 49 | Stamp Duties Act 1828 | An Act to amend the laws in force relating to the Stamp Duties on sea insurances, on articles of clerk- ship, on certificates of writers to the signet, and of conveyancers and others, on licences to dealers in gold and silver plate, and pawnbrokers, on drafts on bankers, and on licences for stage coaches in Great Britain, and on receipts in Ireland. | Section twelve as far as the same relates to Pawnbrokers licences. |
| 9 & 10 Vict.c . 98 | Pawnbrokers Act 1846 | An Act to amend the law for regulating the hours of receiving and delivering goods and chattels as pawns in Pawnbrokers shops. | The whole act. |
| 17 & 18 Vict. c. 90 | Usury Laws Repeal Act 1854 | An Act to repeal the laws relating to usury and to the enrolment of Annuities. | Section four as far as that section provides that all laws touching and concerning Pawnbrokers shall remain in full force and effect to all intents and purposes whatsoever as if that Act had not been passed. |
| 19 & 20 Vict. c. 27 | Pawnbrokers Act 1856 | An Act to amend the Acts relating to Pawnbrokers. | The whole act. |
| 22 & 23 Vict. c. 14 | Pawnbrokers Act 1859 | An Act to amend an Act of the thirty-ninth and fortieth years of King George the Third, for better regulating the business of Pawnbrokers. | The whole act. |
| 23 & 24 Vict. c. 21 | Pawnbrokers Act 1860 | An Act to amend the Act for better regulating the business ofPawnbrokers. | The whole act. |
| 27 & 28 Vict. c. 56 | Revenue (No. 2) Act 1864 | An Act for granting to Her Majesty certain Stamp Duties, and to amend the laws relating to the Inland Revenue. | Section six as far as the same relates to Pawnbrokers licences. |

== Subsequent developments ==
The qualified terms of the repeal "as to Pawnbrokers in Great Britain" meant that several acts were subsequently repealed by subsequent statute law revision acts, including the

- Statute Law Revision Act 1861 (24 & 25 Vict. c. 101)

Section 48 of the act was repealed for England and Wales by section 10(2) of, and part III of schedule 3 to, the Criminal Law Act 1967, which came into force on 1 January 1968.

The whole act was repealed by section 192(3)(b) of, and part I of schedule 5 to, the Consumer Credit Act 1974, which came into force on 19 May 1985.

Article 5 of, and part I of schedule 3 to, the Consumer Credit Act 1974 (Commencement No. 2) Order 1977 (SI 1977/325) provided that the following provisions of the act would be repealed on 1 August 1977.

- Sections 37 to 44 and schedule 6.
- In section 52, the words “or by the refusal of a certificate for a licence”.

Article 5 of, and part I of the schedule to, the Consumer Credit Act 1974 (Commencement No. 6) Order 1980 (SI 1980/50) provided that section 13 of the act would be repealed on 6 October 1980.

Article 5 of, and part I of schedule 2 to, the Consumer Credit Act 1974 (Commencement No. 8) Order 1983 (SI 1983/1551) provided that the whole act, so far as unrepealed, would be repealed on 19 May 1985.
