= Consumer Credit Act 1974 =

Act of the Parliament of the United Kingdom

Consumer Credit Act 1974 (Note: Section 193(1).)
- Act of Parliament
- Parliament of the United Kingdom
- Long title: An Act to establish for the protection of consumers a new system, administered by the Director General of Fair Trading, of licensing and other control of traders concerned with the provision of credit, or the supply of goods on hire or hire-purchase, and their transactions, in place of the present enactments regulating moneylenders, pawnbrokers and hire-purchase traders and their transactions; and for related matters.
- Citation: 1974 c. 39
- Introduced by: Geoffrey Howe (Commons)
- Territorial extent: England and Wales; Scotland; Northern Ireland; (Note: Section 193(2).)

Dates
- Royal assent: 31 July 1974
- Commencement: 31 July 1974, 19 May 1985 (Note: Section 192.)
Other legislation
Amends	Statutory Declarations Act 1835; Metropolitan Police Act 1839; Bills of Sale Act (1878) Amendment Act 1882; Local Government Act 1894; Administration of Estates Act 1925; Children and Young Persons (Scotland) Act 1937; Law Reform (Miscellaneous Provisions) (Scotland) Act 1940; Supply of Goods (Implied Terms) Act 1973
Repeals/revokes	Charitable Pawn Offices (Ireland) Act 1842; Pawnbrokers Act 1872; Money-lenders Act 1900; Moneylenders Act 1927; Money lenders Act (Northern Ireland) 1933; Pawnbrokers Act (Northern Ireland) 1954; Pawnbrokers Act 1960; Hire-Purchase Act 1965; Hire-Purchase (Scotland) Act 1965; Advertisements (Hire-Purchase) Act 1967; Moneylenders (Amendment) Act (Northern Ireland) 1969
Amended by	Sale of Goods Act 1979; Industrial Development Act 1982; Housing (Consequential Provisions) Act 1985; Statute Law (Repeals) Act 1986; Building Societies Act 1986; Debtors (Scotland) Act 1987; Income and Corporation Taxes Act 1988; Age of Legal Capacity (Scotland) Act 1991; Tribunals and Inquiries Act 1992; Clean Air Act 1993; Statute Law (Repeals) Act 1993; Coal Industry Act 1994; Vehicle Excise and Registration Act 1994; Land Registration Act 2002; Enterprise Act 2002; Mental Capacity Act 2005; Law Reform (Miscellaneous Provisions) (Northern Ireland) Order 2005; Consumer Credit Act 2006; Charities Act 2011; Financial Services and Markets Act 2000 (Regulated Activities) (Amendment) (No. 2) Order 2013; Sentencing Act 2020
Relates to	Law of Property Act 1925

Status: Amended

Text of statute as originally enacted

Text of the Consumer Credit Act 1974 as in force today (including any amendments) within the United Kingdom, from legislation.gov.uk.

The Consumer Credit Act 1974 (c. 39) is an act of the Parliament of the United Kingdom that significantly reformed the law relating to consumer credit within the United Kingdom. The act remains in force, albeit heavily amended and partially replaced.

Prior to the act, legislation covering consumer credit was slapdash and focused on particular areas rather than consumer credit as a whole, such as moneylenders and hire-purchase agreements. Following the report of the Crowther Committee in 1971 it was decided that wide-ranging reform of consumer credit law was needed, and a bill to do this was introduced to Parliament. Despite its progress through Parliament being disrupted by a general election, the bill passed quickly through the legislative process thanks to support from both the government and the opposition, coming into law on 31 July 1974.

The act introduced new protection for consumers and new regulation for bodies trading in consumer credit and related industries. Such traders were required to have full licenses, originally issued by the Office of Fair Trading, which may be suspended or revoked in the event of irregularities. The act also regulates what may be taken as security, limits the ways in which credit organisations can advertise and gives the County Court the ability to intercede in the case of unfair or unjust credit agreements. It also gives additional rights to the debtor, including certain limited rights to cancel concluded agreements.

The act has seen multiple amendments, both small and large. The Consumer Credit Act 2006 (an amending act) inserted many further provisions, which sought to further strengthen protection for consumers. The Financial Services and Markets Act 2000 represented a more comprehensive overhaul of all financial regulation. An amending order made under that act in 2013 removed large swathes of the Consumer Credit Act. Part 1 was repealed in its entirety, with oversight transferred from the Office of Fair Trading (now abolished) to the Financial Conduct Authority. Many substantive regulations were also removed, but in many cases these were (broadly speaking) restated in the Regulated Activities Order.

== Background ==
=== Early evolution of consumer protection ===
Consumer credit regulation was ignored by both Parliament and the courts for over 800 years, with the judges and Members of Parliament taking the attitude that there was no reason to interfere with fairly concluded contracts. The first piece of legislation to deal with consumer credit was the Bills of Sale Act 1854 (17 & 18 Vict. c. 36), which required bills of sale to be registered. This allowed the courts to intervene for the first time, since an unregistered bill of sale was void and could not be claimed by creditors. This act was followed by the Bills of Sale Act 1878 (41 & 42 Vict. c. 31) and the Bills of Sale Act (1878) Amendment Act 1882 (45 & 46 Vict. c. 43), which provided limited protection for debtors. Outside of these acts, however, little was done between 1854 and 1900, and moneylenders used this to their advantage, sometimes abusively; the report of the House of Commons Select Committee on Money-Lending in 1898 included testimony from one moneylender who admitted he charged 3,000% interest, while another had worked under 34 different aliases to avoid having notoriety associated with his name.

As a result of this report the Moneylenders Act 1900 was passed, which required registration for moneylenders and allowed the courts to dissolve "unfair" moneylending agreements. This act had two main weaknesses, however; firstly, many of the debtors who would like to sue their moneylender to have the agreement cancelled were by definition poor, and could not afford legal representation. Secondly, the act only focused on specific types of lenders; lending by a single moneylender was covered, lending by a bank was not. A second Moneylenders Act, the Moneylenders Act 1927 was passed, which required licensing as well as registration and forbade moneylenders from employing agents, canvasses or sending out unsolicited advertisements. Unfortunately the 1900 and 1927 acts also covered commercial transactions, and since people lending money in a commercial area were not excluded as banks were, a slight infraction could make a loan completely irrecoverable. This was partially solved with the passing of the Companies Act 1967, which allowed the Board of Trade to give individual moneylenders licenses saying that they were acting as banks, not moneylenders.

As a result of the restrictions on business caused by the Moneylenders Act 1927, the idea of hire-purchase developed. These were first regulated by the Hire-Purchase and Small Debt (Scotland) Act 1932, which only covered Scotland; England and Wales was first covered by the Hire-Purchase Act 1938, later amended by the Hire-Purchase Act 1954 and the Hire-Purchase Act 1964. The 1965 act applied to all hire-purchase agreements worth less than £2,000 and when the hirer and buyer was not a corporation.

=== Crowther Committee ===
In 1965, the Crowther Committee was established to look at the state of consumer credit law in the United Kingdom. Chaired by Lord Crowther, the committee began sitting in December that year and eventually extended their review to cover consumer credit generally rather than just the bills of sale and moneylending they had initially been concerned with, and their report was finally published in March 1971. The report discussed the economical, social and legal aspects of consumer credit, and concluded that the existing law was so confused and unsatisfactory that it was not worth amending. Instead, it recommended the complete repeal of all existing legislation and its replacement with two new acts: a Lending and Security Act, which would regulate legitimate business transactions, and a Consumer Sale and Loan Act which would regulate consumer credit and establish a licensed system for its use.

The reaction to the report from consumer and business organisations was overwhelmingly positive, but the government initially did nothing, since the Department of Trade and Industry wanted time to work out the particular details of any acts. Their hand was eventually forced by Baroness Phillips a year later, who initiated a debate in the House of Lords on the matter. The government's official statement was that they were willing to accept almost all the recommendations made about consumer credit, they did not wish to legislate on lending and securities. In February 1973, they created a voluntary code which they expected those lending to observe. The code set out guidelines for loaning money to individuals and disclosing the cost of the loan.

In September 1973, the government issued a white paper titled Reform of the Law on Consumer Credit in which they indicated they were planning to implement almost all of the Crowther Committee's consumer credit recommendations. The only real differences were an increase in the limits for financial protection from £2,000 to £5,000 (due to the drop in value of money), and stronger protection for hirers under hire-purchase agreements.

== Passage through Parliament ==
The act was first introduced to Parliament as the Consumer Credit Bill at the beginning of November 1973, and initially ran to 96 pages. It was given its second reading on 14 November, and was welcomed by both the government and opposition. By February 1974, it had passed through the committee stage, but its progress was cut short by a general election in the same month. Thanks to the support of the opposition to the original bill, this did not make a significant impact, and the new administration immediately reintroduced the bill in the House of Lords. It was passed on 31 July 1974, and immediately received royal assent. The final version of the act contained 193 sections and five schedules, much larger than the original 96 pages.

== Provisions ==
The act as passed was divided into 12 sections, and was "designed to provide a comprehensive code regulating the consumer credit and consumer hire and almost every aspect of a credit granting operation".

=== Part I: Director General of Fair Trading ===
The office of Director General of Fair Trading was created by the Fair Trading Act 1973, with the director general appointed by the government for a five-year term. Consumer credit was not originally part of his duties (although the scope of his role did contain some elements of consumer credit) and the Crowther Committee had recommended the creation of a separate Consumer Credit Commissioner, something included in the original bill. When the bill was resurrected after the February 1974 general election, however, it was decided that the duties should instead be given to the Office of Fair Trading, and for this purpose a separate division (the Division of Consumer Credit) was set up within the OFT.

Section 1 of the act gave the Director General of Fair Trading the duties of administering the licensing system set up by the act, supervising the working and enforcement of the Act and any regulations made by it and, if appropriate, enforce the act and regulations himself. The DGFT was also tasked with advising the government about social and commercial developments within the United Kingdom, and any actions taken to enforce the act and its orders and regulations. Section 4 of the act required him to disseminate any appropriate information and advice about consumer credit to the people of the United Kingdom. This allowed him to educate the public about consumer credit, and was intended to be conducted through organisations such as the Citizens Advice Bureau. The director general's duties under this act overlap slightly with those given by the Fair Trading Act, but were still an expansion over his original role. The director general was tasked with issuing licenses, and under section 35 of the act, the director general was required to maintain a register containing all appropriate information related to licenses and applications for licenses. The register was created on 2 February 1976, and was kept at Chancery House in London. The Enterprise Act 2002 formally substituted the Office of Fair Trading for the Director General of Fair Trading for the purposes of this Act.

=== Part II: Credit agreements, hire agreements and linked transactions ===
Part II contains definitions for many types of agreements covered by the act. There are three main types of agreement; regulated consumer credit agreements, regulated consumer hire agreements and partially regulated agreements.

==== Regulated agreements ====
A regulated consumer credit agreement is defined as an agreement between two parties, one of whom (the debtor) is an individual, and the other of whom (the creditor) is "any other person", in which the creditor provides the debtor with credit not exceeding £5,000 (this figure was subsequently increased to £25,000 and under the Consumer Credit Act 2006 there is no upper limit). An exception to this definition is so-called "exempt agreements", which are agreements made where the creditor is a land improvement company, a charity, a friendly society, a trade union, an insurance company or "a body corporate named or specifically referred to in any public general Act".

A regulated consumer hire agreement is defined as an agreement between two bodies, one of whom (the hirer) is an individual, and the other of whom, (the owner) is a person, by which goods are loaned to the hirer for use without an option to purchase. The agreement must be "capable of subsisting" for longer than three months, not require the hirer to make payments of more than £5,000 total and not be an "exempt agreement". "Goods" are defined as chattels personal, with "capable of subsisting" simply meaning that the agreement does not restrict the time limit of use to less than three months. The agreement does not have to exceed three months, but the option to do so must be given by one party.

An "individual" (i.e., a debtor enjoying the protections of the act) is defined so as to include unincorporated associations and small partnerships. Lending to a corporation of any sort (including a "corporation sole") is unaffected. Registered societies are corporate bodies, but trade unions and many friendly societies are unincorporated, and thus qualify. By contrast, the definition of "person" (i.e., a creditor) includes both individuals and incorporated bodies.

The definition of "agreement" is given as any discussion which produces a legal relationship; a contract]. As such the decision of courts as to whether an agreement constituted an "agreement" under the act rests with English common law, and thus is not discussed within the act. In many cases this is largely academic, however, since unless one party tries to contest the existence of a contract, any agreement can proceed regardless of its validity under English contract law.

==== Partially regulated agreements ====
Partially regulated agreements are those consumer hire or consumer credit agreements which are not an exempt agreement but are exempt from certain provisions of the act. What these provisions are depends on the type of agreement; small agreements, non-commercial agreements and contracts with a foreign element.

Small agreements are defined in section 17 of the act as regulated consumer credit agreements where the credit does not exceed £30 and regulated consumer hire agreements which do not require the hirer to pay more than £30 in fees. This does not include hire-purchase or conditional sale agreements, which do not qualify regardless of the size of credit, secure transactions and transactions where the parties have attempted to break up a transaction into multiple smaller ones worth under £30 to avoid regulation. Small agreements are exempt from almost all of part V of the act, although they remain controlled by part IV.

The act is primarily aimed at commercial and professional traders, and as a result excludes non-commercial agreements. Non-commercial agreements are defined by the act as agreements where neither the creditor nor debtor are providing the transaction for business purposes in any way. Non-commercial agreements are exempt from part V of the act.

Contracts with a foreign element would not normally be mentioned in acts of Parliament, which are deliberately constructed to avoid giving the law extraterritorial effect. In this case, however, the act contains provisions for contracts with a foreign element, which due to the nature of commerce are common (a credit card issued in the United Kingdom, for example, which is used on holiday in France). As a result, section 16(5) specifically excludes contracts "having a connection with a country outside the United Kingdom" from the act.

=== Part III: Licensing of credit and hire businesses ===
The previous acts on commercial credit provided no mechanism to regulate and enforce the rules, and the Consumer Credit Act's licensing system was the first major regulatory process within British consumer credit law. Licences are required to carry out a consumer credit or consumer hire business, with exceptions for local authorities and corporate bodies specified by an act of Parliament. Part III of the act was repealed in 2013, and since then these licences have been the responsibility of the Financial Conduct Authority. The policy of the act continues, however, with the substance of Part III now taken into the Regulated Activities Order.

==== Types of licence ====
There were two types of licence given – group licences and standard licences.

Group licences were issued by the Director General of Fair Trading to cover a group of people in those activities described in the licence. Group licences could be issued following an application, or simply voluntarily by the Director. Holders of a group licence do not have to apply individually and are not vetted individually, and holding a group licence does not prevent members from also applying for a standard licence. The group licences are intended for cases where individual screening is not in the public interest; for example, when bodies are so large and established that their reputation is without question and individual screening would take too much time. Bodies currently holding group licences include the Law Society of England and Wales and the Law Society of Northern Ireland, both professional associations of solicitors. The Director had the ability to exclude named individuals from group licences to prevent obvious abuse.

Standard licences were licences issued by the Director General to an individual. These could only be provided following an application, not at the Director General's discretion like a group licence, and covered certain activities in a fixed period. Initially there was no obligation to issue licences, but an amendment to the bill in Parliament means that the Director General is required to issue a licence on the application of any person, providing that person is a fit person to engage in such activities and the name he applies to be licensed under is not misleading or undesirable. The licence allows an individual or a partnership to trade under those names listed on the licence, and is divided into seven categories:

- Category A: Consumer credit business
- Category B: Consumer hire business
- Category C: Credit brokerage
- Category D: Debt-adjusting and counselling
- Category E: Debt-collecting
- Category F: Credit reference agencies

Holders of a licence were obliged to inform the Director General when there is a change made within the office of a corporate licensee, an unincorporated body or a partnership. This must be done within 21 days of the change occurring. Details of new licences were published in the Consumer Credit Bulletin, the weekly journal of the Office of Fair Trading. A licence lasted for three years beginning with the date specified on the licence, not the date of its issue. A person who engages in activities that require a licence when he does not have one commits a criminal offence. In addition, those agreements he makes are considered unenforceable unless the Director General directly intercedes. (This function is now performed by the court, on application.)

A licence could be terminated on the death of the licensee, the licensee becoming bankrupt, the licensee becoming a patient under the Mental Health Act 1959, a bankruptcy deal under the Bankruptcy Act 1914 in which the licence is given to a trustee or a deal under the Deeds of Arrangement Act 1914 in which the licensee's licence is handed to a trustee. Such provisions covered both individual, unincorporated bodies and partnerships who are licence holders. These provisions did not cover corporate bodies, because following consultations the government became aware that the liquidation and winding-up of a corporate body would pose problems with licensing, largely because the body continues to trade through a liquidator.

=== Part IV: Seeking business ===
The act specifically controls the way in which traders and companies seek business. Prior to this individual aspects had been controlled — advertisement by moneylenders had been strictly regulated since the Moneylenders Act 1927 — but no other aspects of consumer credit were regulated at all. While this was acceptable for large and respectable institutions, the evolution of less reputable trading organisations necessitated some kind of regulation, and the Consumer Credit Act was the first statute to provide such controls for consumer credit organisations. It covers three main areas: advertising, canvassing and quotations and the display of information. No regulations have yet been made on quotations or the display of information.

==== Advertising ====
The advertising provisions apply to any advertisement published for the business carried out by the advertiser which indicates he is willing to provide credit or provide goods to be hired. "advertisement" is taken to mean any form of advertisement, including a publication, television or radio broadcast, the display of signs, labels or goods, the distribution of samples, circulars, catalogues or price lists or the exhibition of picture, models or films, or in "any other way". Previous legislation such as the Advertisements (Hire-Purchase) Act 1967 limited the definition of advertisement to visual advertisements and excluded oral communications and radio broadcasts, which are included by the act. The test of whether an oral communication counts as an "advertisement" is whether or not the communication is made for drawing attention to the advertiser's business or for answering a specific enquiry without promoting the business. In R. v Delmayne [1970] 2 QB 170 the High Court of Justice decided that even replying to an enquiry can amount to an advertisement if framed in such a way that it is calculated to attract business.

Part IV only applies to "public" advertising published to promote a business — as such circulars given to employees advertising such terms would not be considered "advertisements". Advertisements are not regulated by the act if the advertiser is not involved in a consumer credit business, consumer hire business or a business in which he provides credit to individuals.

Under part IV, the Secretary of State can make regulations limiting the form and content of advertisements covered by the act. The regulations can also specifically include certain terms or facts, and failing to follow them constitutes an offence. The intent of these regulations is to ensure that no advertisement contains misleading information, that advertisements provide the reader with a "reasonable picture" of the terms and conditions and that the reader is aware that the availability and terms of credit may be affected by factors such as the age and employment of the applicant.

==== Canvassing ====
The Crowther Committee recommended that doorstep canvassing for loans should be completely prohibited. The original provisions in the bill were indeed extremely stringent, and caused potential problems for other businesses, but were significantly amended and now only affect the canvassing they were intended to prevent. Canvassing is defined as a situation in which an individual (the canvasser) solicits the entry of another individual (the consumer) into an agreement based on his oral representations during a visit by the canvasser to "any place" for the purpose of making such representations. Exceptions to "any place" are places where business is carried out, either permanently or temporarily, by the creditor, owner, supplier, canvasser, employer of the canvasser or the consumer. There is no requirement that the oral solicitations take place in person - they can come over the telephone, or be trying to induce another individual to convince the consumer into entering an agreement.

=== Part V: Entry into credit or hire agreements ===
Part V of the act deals with four elements of entering into a credit or hire agreement; pre-contract disclosure, the formalities of entry into a regulated agreement, cancellation of a regulated agreement and its consequences and withdrawal from a prospective regulated agreement and its consequences. In some cases, specific information must be disclosed before a contract is made, with the standard provision that contracts where this is not followed are unenforceable without an order from the courts.

==== Formalities ====
There are certain formalities for entry into a regulated agreement, mostly based on the documentation that must be provided. Under section 60, the Secretary of State is required to make certain regulations covering the format that contracts must take. These regulations must ensure that the debtor is made aware of the rights and/or duties conferred on him by the agreement, the amount and rate of the total charge for credit, the protection and remedies available to him and "any other matters which, in the opinion of the secretary of state, it is desirable for him to know about in connection with the agreement". The act allows the Director General of Fair Trading to waive certain requirements if it appears, on the application of a consumer credit business, that to enforce them would be impracticable.

Section 61 lays out the formalities required for a regulated agreement. The terms must be found in a signed and legible document, a copy of the unsigned agreement must be supplied to the debtor or hirer, a copy of the signed document must be supplied to the debtor or hirer and a notice advising the debtor or hirer of his rights of cancellation must be included with the signed and unsigned copies. The "signed and legible document" is described in section 61 as a document which contains all the prescribed terms, other than implied terms, and is, when presented to the debtor or hirer for signature, in such a state that all its terms are legible. Such a document must be in the form "prescribed by regulations".

Consumer Credit (Agreements) Regulations 1983
- Statutory Instrument
- Parliament of the United Kingdom
- Citation: SI 1983/1553

Dates
- Made: 24 October 1983
- Laid before Parliament: 3 November 1983
- Commencement: 19 May 1985
Other legislation
Made under	Consumer Credit Act 1974

Text of statute as originally enacted

The regulations in question are the Consumer Credit (Agreements) Regulations 1983 (SI 1983/1553)). These regulations laid down specific rules regarding certain "prescribed terms". For example, a regulated credit agreement had to contain prescribed information about the amount of credit, the length of any fixed term loan, the amount of monthly repayments and so on. If a lender failed to comply with the prescribed regulations then the agreement would not be "properly executed" under section 61 and could then be challenged as "irredeemably unenforceable" under section 127.

==== Withdrawals ====
Part V contains several provisions relating to the cancellation of a regulated agreement and the withdrawal from a prospective regulated agreement. These are similar to those found in the Hire-Purchase Act 1965, but cover all consumer credit and consumer hire agreements rather than the hire-purchase and instalment sale agreements previously covered. The withdrawal from a prospective agreement is found primarily at common law; a party may withdraw from a prospective agreement at any point before it becomes a contract without obligations. He can withdraw the prospective agreement by notice to the other party, with the act allowing the creditor to use credit brokers as agents for this purpose.

The right to cancel a confirmed agreement was introduced by the Hire-Purchase Act 1964, mainly to frustrate doorstep salesmen who would take advantage of an unsuspecting person and force them to sign up to an agreement, normally with misrepresentations. In the Consumer Credit Act, the right of cancellation is covered in section 67, which allows the debtor or hirer the right to cancel an agreement if there were false oral representations made to the debtor by somebody acting for the creditor. The cancellation may be enacted by serving a notice of writing given to the creditor or an agent of the creditor within six days of the agreement being made.

=== Part VI: Matters arising during currency of credit or hire agreements ===
Section 75 protects consumers who use a credit card to pay for goods valued between £100 and £30,000 where the goods are not delivered or do not match the description given of the goods, or where the condition or functionality of the goods has been misrepresented. This section provides for credit card issuers to be jointly and severally liable along with the supplier for compliance with the contract of supply.

Consumer Credit (Increase of Monetary Limits) Order 1983
- Statutory Instrument
- Parliament of the United Kingdom
- Citation: SI 1983/1878

Dates
- Made: 16 December 1983
- Commencement: 1 January 1984; 20 May 1985
Other legislation
Made under	Consumer Credit Act 1974

Text of statute as originally enacted

Originally this provision applied to payments for goods valued between £30 and £10,000. The limits were increased under the Consumer Credit (Increase of Monetary Limits) Order 1983 (SI 1983/1878), effective from 1 January 1984 (for the lower limit increase to £100) and 20 May 1985 (for the upper limit increase to £30,000).

=== Part VIII: Security ===
The act was the first attempt by the Government of the United Kingdom to provide coherent rules relating to the taking of securities when dealing with consumer credit. Other than the Bills of Sale Acts there had been little law on securities before this, apart from a few provisions in the Hire-Purchase Acts. The Consumer Credit Act devoted an entire part of the act to security, mostly between debtor and creditor, with third-party rights and regulations mostly governed by common law. The act provides the form of securities, requires certain information and documents to be supplied, controls the enforcement of securities and provides certain circumstances in which securities can be considered void.

"Security" is defined by the act to mean any form of mortgage, bond, indemnity, guarantee or other right provided by the debtor as "security" to the consumer credit or hire-purchase agreement being conducted with the creditor. This covers both "real" securities such as mortgages and personal securities such as bonds. The only requirement is that the security must be given at the request of the debtor. Any security must be expressed in writing, and in some cases are part of the original hire agreement. This is distinct from previous law, which required a written note of the agreement but allowed the agreement to be conducted orally.

Certain other formalities must be observed; under section 105, a security is not considered properly executed unless a document is signed on or on behalf of the debtor. This document must conform to certain regulations; the terms must be legible when it is presented to be signed, it must give all the terms and conditions other than implied terms, a copy must also be presented and if the security is provided before the regulated agreement is made, a copy of the security agreement must be given to the debtor within seven days of the regulated agreement being made. If the formalities are not complied with the security agreement becomes unenforceable without a court order. The act does not provide for any civil or criminal sanctions for creditors who enforce the agreement without a court order, however, but it may lead to the revocation or suspension of the creditor's license.

=== Part IX: Judicial control ===
Part IX (sections 127-144) gives the courts wide powers to re-open credit deals deemed extortionate, and gives them control over regulated agreements. Section 189 establishes that "courts" means the County Court in England and Wales: all problems are to be brought to the County Court, although certain situations relating to extortionate credit agreements can be sent to the High Court. In Scotland "court" means the sheriff court, and in Northern Ireland, either the High Court or the county court.

==== Orders ====
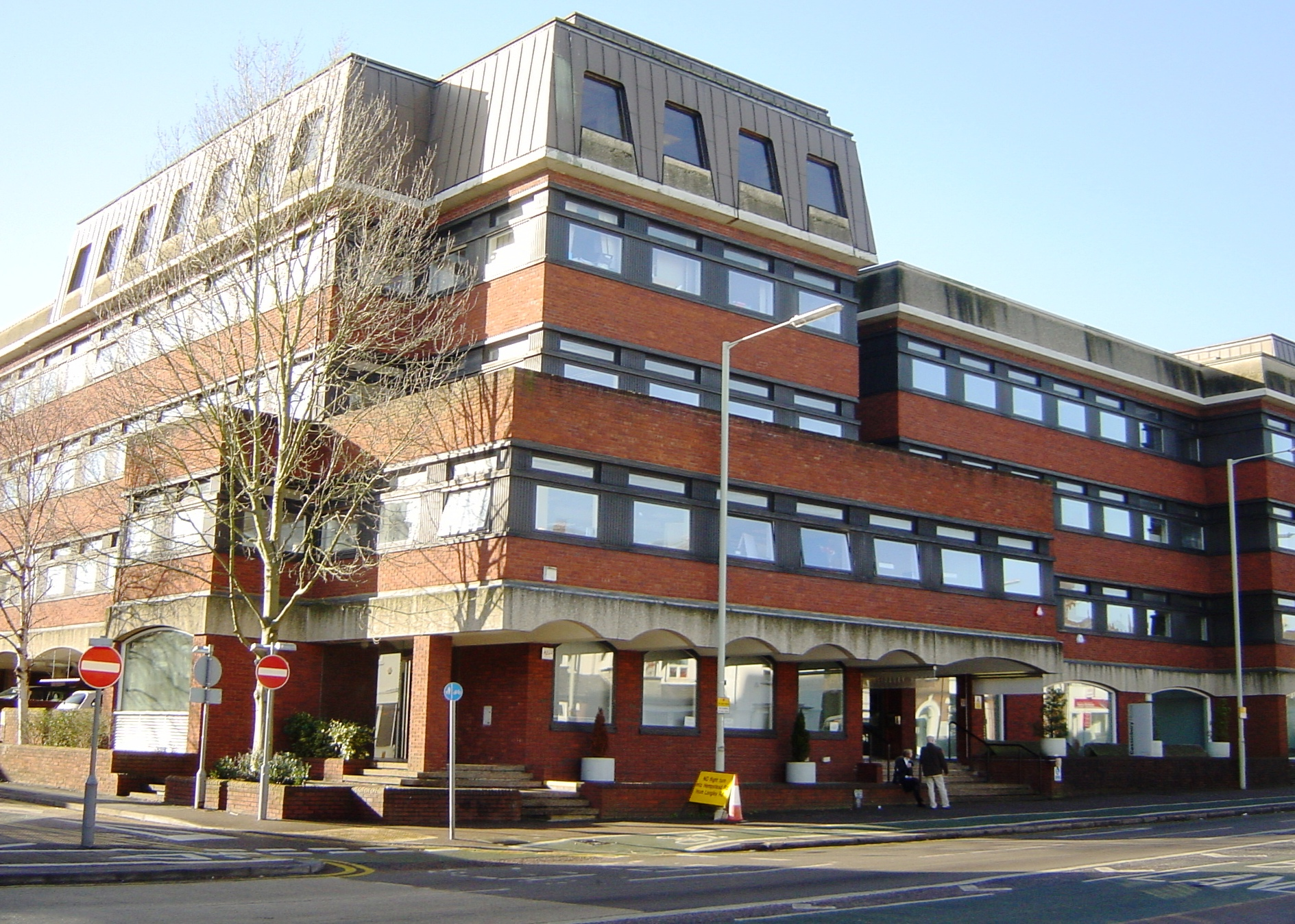
The County Court at Watford: the County Court deals with the majority of judicial actions brought under the act.

The courts are allowed to issue enforcement orders for cases where the contract has been infringed upon, except in situations where the contract has not been signed or the terms are not set out in the contract, in which case they are permanently unenforceable. The courts are also prohibited from making enforcement orders where the owner or creditor did not give a copy of the agreement to the debtor or hirer before the contract commenced. Other than this the court is obliged to issue such orders. There are also situations in which orders can be made even when there has been no infringement. These are when the debtor or hirer has died, to recover protected goods without the consent of a debtor and to enforce a land mortgage.

The courts can also make "time orders" providing for either payment by the debtor of any sum owed to the creditor, remedying any breach of the agreement by the debtor other than non-payment of money or both. These orders are made at the discretion of the courts after an application for an enforcement order. The time orders can also cover statutory bailment in the case of hire-order or hire-purchase agreements. If the court feels that the property in dispute or acting as security is at risk of damage or deprecation, they can give protection orders preventing the use of the property. This re-enacts section 35 of the Hire-Purchase Act 1965, which was repealed by the Consumer Credit Act.

Other orders are "special orders", covered by section 133 of the act. There are two types; return orders and transfer orders. Return orders are orders from the court requiring the return of goods covered by the agreement to the creditor. These orders may be immediate or subject to a delay, and may give the debtor the option to pay the goods value to the creditor if he does not return the goods in time. Transfer orders are orders transferring the creditor's ownership of certain goods to the debtor, ordering the payment of the rest of the goods to the creditor. This can only be done if the debtor pays an amount of money equal or more than one third of the value of the returned goods.

==== Credit bargains ====
The courts have long held equitable jurisdiction to set aside "harsh and unconscionable bargains", but prior to the Consumer Credit Act this was mainly used in cases where uninformed tradespeople have been selling goods at a loss, and was rarely used in the 20th century. The Moneylenders Act 1900 allowed the court to re-open a moneylending transaction if there was evidence that interest rates were "harsh and unconscionable or otherwise such that a court of equity would give relief", unless the moneylender could justify the rates. It was rarely used in the field of consumer credit because it was limited to those sorts of consumer transactions covered by the Moneylenders Act, and did not cover hire-purchase agreements or instalment sale agreements or loan transactions from people who were not moneylenders, such as banks.

The Consumer Credit Act provided guidelines for courts in determining whether a credit bargain is extortionate and extends the court's jurisdiction in this area to cover all credit agreements. If the court does believe the bargain was extortionate, it can re-open the agreement and examine the terms of it. If they decide it is indeed extortionate, they can set aside the remaining money owed, order the creditor to give money to the debtor, alter the terms of the agreement or order the return of any security. This only covers consumer credit agreements, not hire agreements.

=== Part X: Ancillary credit businesses ===
==== Definitions ====
An ancillary credit business is defined in section 145 of the act as any business that works in credit brokerage, debt adjusting, debt collecting, debt counselling or as a credit reference agency.

Credit brokers are people involved in negotiating deals between potential debtors looking for credit and creditors, normally in exchange for a commission. Under the act, "credit broker" includes not only mortgage brokers and loan brokers but also car dealers, shops that introduce customers to financial houses for hire-purchase agreements and solicitors who negotiate advances for non-corporate clients. An exception to this is if introductions and negotiations are not made in the individual's capacity as an employee of a business.

Debt adjusting is when a company or individual negotiates with the creditor or owner in an agreement on behalf of the debtor to change the terms for the discharge of the debt, takes over the debt in exchange for payment by the debtor or engages in "any similar activity concerned with the liquidation of a debt". This is again a wide area; the base definition covers, for example, solicitors and accountants who act as negotiators for clients who owe money to a third party. There are certain exceptions; a solicitor negotiating for the settlement of his client's debts is not considered to be working as a debt adjuster thanks to section 146 of the act, which excludes "a solicitor engaging in contentious business" as defined in the Solicitors Act 1957.

Debt counselling is the giving of advice to debtors or hirers about the liquidation of debts under consumer credit or consumer hire agreements. This covers any debt counsellor, regardless of if it is free legal advice; as a result the Citizens Advice Bureau, for example, is considered a debt counsellor, although its advisers are covered by a group license. Debt collectors are covered by similar provisions, and are defined as anybody who takes steps to "procure payment of debts due" under consumer credit agreements and consumer hire agreements. Those who "purchase" debts and attempt to collect on them are covered by this definition.

Exceptions for these definitions are provided under section 146 if the credit broker, debt adjuster, debt counsellor or debt collector is the creditor or owner under the credit agreement, the supplier under the agreement, a credit broker who has acquired the business of the supplier or somebody expressly excluded from certain definitions, such as a solicitor. The provisions for suppliers only come into effect when the credit is a loan, so that the supplier and creditor are different people. The exceptions do not include people who "buy" the roles above by purchasing the debts, such as professional debt buyers or financial houses.

Credit reference agencies are covered separately from other ancillary credit businesses, and are defined in section 148 as individuals or companies which carry on a business "comprising the furnishing of persons with information relevant to the financial standard of individuals, being information collected by the agency for that purpose". This definition was the subject of much academic debate, because the holding of the license for a credit reference agency involves a duty to supply information on credit status which the company might prefer to keep confidential. There are exceptions; the information must be collected for the purpose of giving it to others, so the fact that a bank, for example, has that information, does not mean they need to obtain a license as a credit reference agency.

==== Licensing and other matters ====
Part III of the act applies directly to ancillary credit businesses, who must obtain a license. As with standard credit agreements, agreements made by an unlicensed ancillary trader are only enforceable against the other party if the Director General of Fair Trading issues an order which applies to the agreement. Under section 149, creditors have an onus to make sure that the credit brokers they obtain business from are duly licensed. Again, if the broker is unlicensed, the agreement between the debtor and creditor is only enforceable when the Director General makes an order saying so. These provisions came into effect on 1 July 1978.

Part IV of the act also applies to ancillary credit businesses in relation to advertising, canvassing and quotations, as well as ways in which business can be sought. The act also limited the brokerage fees that credit brokers can charge. Under section 155, if the brokerage work does not lead to the client entering into an agreement with a creditor within six months of the work, the entire fee (minus the sum of £1) is refundable to the client. The Director General at the time indicated that those businesses which flouted Section 155 would be refused a license. These provisions came into force on 1 April 1977.

=== Repealed enactments ===
Section 192(3)(b) of the act repealed 59 enactments, listed in parts I and II of schedule 5 to the act.

==== Part I: United Kingdom ====
Part I — United Kingdom
Citation	Short title	Extent of repeal
5 & 6 Will. 4. c. 62	Statutory Declarations Act 1835	Section 12.
2 & 3 Vict. c. 47	Metropolitan Police Act 1839	Section 50.
2 & 3 Vict. c. 71	Police Courts (Metropolis) Act 1839	In section 27 the words " pawned, pledged " and the words " or of any person who shall have advanced money upon the credit of such-goods ". In section 28 the words " pawned, pledged or " (in each place).
35 & 36 Vict. c. 93	Pawnbrokers Act 1872	The whole act.
38 & 39 Vict. c. 25	Public Stores Act 1875	In section 9 the words " or a pawnbroker" and " or to pawnbrokers ".
54 & 55 Vict. c. 50	Commissioners for Oaths Act 1891	In section 1, the words " or the Pawnbrokers Act 1872".
55 & 56 Vict. c. 4	Betting and Loans (Infants) Act 1892	Sections 2 to 4. Section 6, except as far as it extends to Northern Ireland. In section 7, the definitions of " indictment" and " summary conviction ".
55 & 56 Vict. c. 55	Burgh Police (Scotland) Act 1892	In section 453, the words " and all offences committed against the provisions of the Pawnbrokers Act 1872,".
56 & 57 Vict. c. 71	Sale of Goods Act 1893	Section 14(6).
56 & 57 Vict. c. 73	Local Government Act 1894	Section 27(1)(b).
60 & 61 Vict. c. 30	Police (Property) Act 1897	In section 1(1), the words " or section thirty-four of the Pawnbrokers Act 1872 ".
63 & 64 Vict. c. 51	Moneylenders Act 1900	The whole act.
8 Edw. 7. c. 53	Law of Distress Amendment Act 1908	In section 4(1) the words " bill of sale, hire purchase agreement or ".
17 & 18 Geo. 5. c. 21	Moneylenders Act 1927	The whole act.
23 & 24 Geo. 5. c. 12	Children and Young Persons Act 1933	Section 8.
1 Edw. 8 & 1 Geo. 6. c. 37	Children and Young Persons (Scotland) Act 1937	Section 19.
2 & 3 Geo. 6. c. 75	Compensation (Defence) Act 1939	In section 18(1) the words from " the expression ' hire purchase agreement' " to " omitted ".
2 & 3 Geo. 6. c. 102	Liability for War Damage (Miscellaneous Provisions) Act 1939	Sections 4 and 6(b).
3 & 4 Geo. 6. c. 42	Law Reform (Miscellaneous Provisions) (Scotland) Act 1940	In section 4(2), paragraphs (b) and (c).
8 & 9 Geo. 6. c. 16	Limitation (Enemies and War Prisoners) Act 1945	In section 2, the words " subsection (1) of section thirteen of the Moneylenders Act 1927 ". In section 4, the words " subsection (1) of section thirteen of the Moneylenders Act 1927".
11 & 12 Geo. 6. c. 38	Companies Act 1948	Section 201(2)(c).
12 & 13 Geo. 6. c. 47	Finance Act 1949	In section 15, subsections (1) to (3) and (6) to (8A).
15 & 16 Geo. 6 & 1 Eliz. 2. c. 44	Customs and Excise Act 1952	In section 313(1) the words " or section fifteen of the Finance Act 1949 ".
4 & 5 Eliz. 2. c. 68	Restrictive Trade Practices Act 1956	Section 26(4) from " and for the reference to a hire-purchase agreement' " onwards. Section 26(5).
8 & 9 Eliz. 2. c. 24	Pawnbrokers Act 1960	The whole act.
9 & 10 Eliz. 2. c. 36	Finance Act 1961	Section 11(1) from " or section 15 of the Finance Act 1949 " onwards.
1964 c. 42	Administration of Justice Act 1964	Section 9(3)(b).
1964 c. 53	Hire-Purchase Act 1964	The whole act, except Part III and section 37.
1964 c. 60	Emergency Laws (Re-enactments and Repeals) Act 1964	Section 1(4).
1964 c. 71	Trading Stamps Act 1964	In section 10(1) the definition of " purchase ".
1965 c. 66	Hire-Purchase Act 1965	The whole act.
1965 c. 67	Hire-Purchase (Scotland) Act 1965	The whole act.
1966 c. 42	Local Government Act 1966	In Schedule 3, Part II, the entries relating to section 37 of the Pawnbrokers Act 1872 and section 1(1) of the Moneylenders Act 1927.
1966 c. 51	Local Government (Scotland) Act 1966	In Schedule 4, Part II, the entries relating to section 37 of the Pawnbrokers Act 1872 and section 1(1) of the Moneylenders Act 1927.
1967 c. 42	Advertisements (Hire-Purchase) Act 1967	The whole act.
1967 c. 81	Companies Act 1967	Sections 123 to 125.
1968 c. 60	Theft Act 1968	In Schedule 2, Part III, the entry relating to the Pawnbrokers Act 1872.
1969 c. 19	Decimal Currency Act 1969	In Schedule 2, paragraph 2.
1969 c. 48	Post Office Act 1969	In Schedule 4, paragraph 31.
1971 c. 23	Courts Act 1971	In Schedule 9, Part I, the entries relating to the Pawnbrokers Act 1872 and the Moneylenders Act 1927.
1972 c. 70	Local Government Act 1972	Section 213(1)(a) and (b) and (3).
1973 c. 65	Local Government (Scotland) Act 1973	In Schedule 27, paragraph 96. In Schedule 29, the entry relating to the Finance Act 1949.

==== Part II: Northern Ireland ====
Part II — Northern Ireland
Citation	Short title	Extent of repeal
5 & 6 Vict. c. 75	Charitable Pawn Offices (Ireland) Act 1842	The whole act.
1933 c. 23 (N.I.)	Moneylenders Act (Northern Ireland) 1933	The whole act.
1939 c. 36 (N.I.)	Liability for War Damage (Miscellaneous Provisions) Act (Northern Ireland) 1939	In section 5(1) the definition of " hire-purchase agreement".
1949 c. 2 (N.I.)	Agriculture Act (Northern Ireland) 1949	Section 7(2).
1954 c. 30 (N.I.)	Pawnbrokers Act (Northern Ireland) 1954	The whole act.
1957 c. 19 (N.I.)	Betting and Lotteries Act (Northern Ireland) 1957	Section 3(1)(j).
1960 c. 22 (N.I.)	Companies Act (Northern Ireland) 1960	Section 192(3)(c).
1965 c. 6 (N.I.)	Trading Stamps Act (Northern Ireland) 1965	In section 9 the definition of " purchase ".
1966 c. 42 (N.I.)	Hire-Purchase Act (Northern Ireland) 1966	The whole act except Part VI and section 68.
1967 c. 29 (N.I.)	Increase of Fines Act (Northern Ireland) 1967	In Part I of the Schedule the entries relating to the Moneylenders Act (Northern Ireland) 1933.
1968 c. 28 (N.I.)	Criminal Justice (Miscellaneous Provisions) Act (Northern Ireland) 1968	In Schedule 2 the entry relating to the Moneylenders Act (Northern Ireland) 1933.
1969 c. 16 (N.I.)	Theft Act (Northern Ireland) 1969	In Schedule 2 the entry relating to the Pawnbrokers Act (Northern Ireland) 1954.
1969 c. 24 (N.I.)	Industrial and Provident Societies Act (Northern Ireland) 1969	Section 96.
1969 c. 27 (N.I.)	Moneylenders (Amendment) Act (Northern Ireland) 1969	The whole act.
1969 c. 30 (N.I.)	Judgments (Enforcement) Act (Northern Ireland) 1969	In Schedule 4 the amendments of the Hire-Purchase Act (Northern Ireland) 1966.
1971 c. 13 (N.I.)	Licensing Act (Northern Ireland) 1971	Section 2(5)(b).
1972 c. 11 (N.I.)	Miscellaneous Transferred Excise Duties Act (Northern Ireland) 1972	Parts VI and VII. In Schedule 4 the entry relating to the Pawnbrokers Act (Northern Ireland) 1954.

== Implementation of the act ==
Consumer Credit Act 1974 (Commencement No. 8) Order 1983 (Note: Section 1(1).)
- Statutory Instrument
- Parliament of the United Kingdom
- Citation: SI 1983/1551
- Territorial extent: United Kingdom

Dates
- Made: 24 October 1983
- Commencement: 19 May 1985 (Note: Section 2.)
Other legislation
Made under	Consumer Credit Act 1974

Status: Current legislation

Text of statute as originally enacted

Text of the Consumer Credit Act 1974 (Commencement No. 8) Order 1983 as in force today (including any amendments) within the United Kingdom, from legislation.gov.uk.

Some elements of the act came into force on 31 July 1974, the day it was passed, but many were left to be brought in later at the discretion of the government. This process was "painfully slow", with almost nothing apart from the licensing system being active in 1979. Section 141, which requires enforcement actions of a regulated credit or linked transaction to be pursued in the county court, came into force on 19 May 1985 through the statutory instrument Consumer Credit Act 1974 (Commencement No. 8) Order 1983 (SI 1983/1551). The act repealed the Hire-Purchase Act 1965, the Advertisements (Hire Purchase) Act 1967, the Moneylenders Act 1900, the Moneylenders Act 1927, the Pawnbrokers Act 1872 and the Pawnbrokers Act 1960. The act was influential outside the United Kingdom, and was studied in both the United States and the Commonwealth of Nations. It formed the basis of a 1979 Directive on Consumer Credit of the European Union.

The act did not go to the full extent suggested by the Crowther Committee's report, with protection only being available for consumers, not for the credit industry.

The act was widely supported by all sides of the political spectrum, and by academia. Arthur Rogerson compared it to the Law of Property Act 1925 (15 & 16 Geo. 5. c. 20) in that, like the 1925 act, it "represents fundamental rethinking of an area of great economic significance, which has resulted in the sweeping away of a chaos of obsolete rules, and the substitution for them of a simpler and better enforced body of law".

== Reform ==
In 2022 the UK government announced its intention to reform the Consumer Credit Act of1974. Following a strategy consultation in December 2022 and a response in 2023, HM Treasury published an initial phase consultation on 19 May 2025 dealing with the Act's information requirements, sanctions and criminal offences. Subsequently on the 18th of May 2026, HM Treasury published a policy statement confirming its intention to repeal the majority of the remaining provisions of the Act and to recast them where appropriate, in rules made by the Financial Conduct Authority.

== See also ==
- Banking in the United Kingdom
- Consumer Credit Act 2006
- Credit risk
- History of banking in the United Kingdom
- Director General of Fair Trading v First National Bank plc [2001] UKHL 52
- Wilson v First County Trust Ltd (No 2)

== Bibliography ==
Primary sources

- "Consumer Credit Act 1974 (current version)". UK Statute Law Database.
- "Consumer Credit Act 1974 (original version)" (PDF). Office of Public Sector Information. 1974. Archived from the original (PDF) on 6 February 2009.
- "Enterprise Act 2002 (original version)" (PDF). Office of Public Sector Information. 2002.

Secondary sources

- Goode, R. M. (1979). Consumer Credit Act: A Students Guide. Butterworths. ISBN 0-406-21165-5.
- Keenan, Denis; Riches, Sarah (2005). Business law. Pearson Illustrated. ISBN 0-582-89397-6.
- Rogerson, Arthur (1975). "The Consumer Credit Act 1974". Modern Law Review. 38 (4). Blackwell. ISSN 0026-7961.
