= Statute Law Revision (Northern Ireland) Act 1976 =

Act of the Parliament of the United Kingdom

Statute Law Revision (Northern Ireland) Act 1976 (Note: Section 2(1).)
- Act of Parliament
- Parliament of the United Kingdom
- Long title: An Act to revise the statute law of Northern Ireland by repealing obsolete, spent, unnecessary or superseded enactments.
- Citation: 1976 c. 12
- Territorial extent: Northern Ireland (Note: Section 2(2).)

Dates
- Royal assent: 13 April 1976
- Commencement: 13 April 1976 (Note: The Acts of Parliament (Commencement) Act 1793.)
- Repealed: 19 November 1998
Other legislation
Repealed by	Statute Law (Repeals) Act 1998
Relates to	Repeal of Obsolete Statutes Act 1856; See Statute Law Revision Act

Status: Repealed

Text of statute as originally enacted

The Statute Law Revision (Northern Ireland) Act 1976 (c. 12) was an act of the Parliament of the United Kingdom.

== Subsequent developments ==
The whole act was repealed by section 1(1) of, and group 1 of part IX of schedule 1 to, the Statute Law (Repeals) Act 1998, which came into force on 19 November 1998.

== See also ==
- Statute Law Revision Act

== Bibliography ==
- The Public General Acts and General Synod Measures 1976. HMSO. London. 1977. Part I. Page 105.
- HL Deb vol 366, cols 391 and 818 to 819, vol 367, col 634, vol 368, cols 1412 to 1413, vol 369, cols 11 and 990, HC Deb vol 908, cols 204 to 205 and 745 to 746.
