= List of statutory instruments of the United Kingdom, 1983 =

This is an incomplete list of statutory instruments of the United Kingdom in 1983.

== Statutory instruments ==
=== 1-499 ===
==== 1–99 ====
- Avon and Somerset (Areas) Order 1983 (SI 1983/84)
- Boothferry (Parishes) Order 1983 (SI 1983/96)

==== 100–199 ====
- Child Benefit (Interim Payments) Regulations 1983 (SI 1983/104)
- Borough of Neath (Electoral Arrangements) Order 1983 (SI 1983/116)
- District of Radnor (Electoral Arrangements) Order 1983 (SI 1983/121)
- Borough of Islwyn (Electoral Arrangements) Order 1983 (SI 1983/122)
- Merthyr Tydfil (Communities) Order 1983 (SI 1983/124)
- Lotteries (Gaming Board Fees) Order 1983 (SI 1983/126)
- Landlord and Tenant Act 1954, Part II (Notices) Regulations 1983 (SI 1983/133)
- Pneumoconiosis, Byssinosis and Miscellaneous Diseases Benefit Scheme 1983 (SI 1983/136)
- The Knowsley (Parishes) Order 1983 S.I. 1983/138
- Financial Provisions (Northern Ireland) Order 1983 (SI 1983/147) (N.I. 1)
- Quarries (Northern Ireland) Order 1983 (SI 1983/150) (N.I. 4)
- Representation of the People Act 1983 (Commencement) Order 1983 (SI 1983/153)
- Newport (Communities) Order 1983 (SI 1983/154)
- Selby (Parishes) Order 1983 (SI 1983/167)
- Parish of Feckenham Order 1983 (SI 1983/192)

==== 200–299 ====
- Swansea (Communities) Order 1983 (SI 1983/206)
- Borough of Merthyr Tydfil (Electoral Arrangements) Order 1983 (SI 1983/209)
- Crown Roads (Royal Parks) (Application of Road Traffic Enactments) (Amendment) Order 1983 (SI 1983/217)
- Borough of Newport (Electoral Arrangements) Order 1983 S.I. 1983/237
- Third Country Fishing (Enforcement) Order 1983 S.I. 1983/258
- Aberconwy (Communities) Order 1983 S.I. 1983/269
- West Somerset (Parishes) Order 1983 S.I. 1983/288
- Supreme Court Funds (Amendment) Rules 1983 S.I. 1983/290
- County Court Funds (Amendment) Rules 1983 (SI 1983/291)
- Seeds (National Lists of Varieties) (Fees) (Amendment) Regulations 1983 (SI 1983/293)
- Local Government (Prescribed Expenditure) Regulations 1983 (SI 1983/296)

==== 300–399 ====
- National Health Service (Charges for Drugs and Appliances) Amendment Regulations 1983 (SI 1983/306)
- National Health Service (General Medical and Pharmaceutical Services) Amendment Regulations 1983 (SI 1983/313)
- National Health Service (Regional and District Health Authorities: Membership and Procedure) Regulations 1983 (SI 1983/315)
- South Derbyshire (Parishes) Order 1983 (SI 1983/329)
- Colwyn (Communities) Order 1983 (SI 1983/331)
- Income Tax (Interest Relief) (Housing Associations) Regulations 1983 (SI 1983/368)
- Statutory Sick Pay (Compensation of Employers) and Miscellaneous Provisions Regulations 1983 (SI 1983/376)
- City of Swansea (Electoral Arrangements) Order 1983 (SI 1983/381)

==== 400–499 ====
- Easington (Parishes) Order 1983 (SI 1983/412)
- Parliamentary Constituencies (England) Order 1983 (SI 1983/417)
- Rates (Amendment) (Northern Ireland) Order 1983 (SI 1983/421) (N.I. 7)
- Parliamentary Constituencies (Scotland) Order 1983 (SI 1983/422)
- Sedgefield (Parishes) Order 1983 (SI 1983/433)
- West Derbyshire (Parishes) Order 1983 (SI 1983/434)
- Borough of Colwyn (Electoral Arrangements) Order 1983 (SI 1983/447)
- Borough of Cynon Valley (Electoral Arrangements) Order 1983 (SI 1983/448)
- Restormel (Parishes) Order 1983 (SI 1983/460)
- British Fishing Boats Order 1983 (SI 1983/482)

== 501–600 ==
- Central and Strathclyde Regions and Stirling District (Croftamie) (Electoral Arrangements) Amendment Order 1983 (SI 1983/535)
- Civil Aviation Authority Regulations 1983 (SI 1986/550)

== 601–700 ==
- Nurses, Midwives and Health Visitors (Parts of the Register) Order 1983 S.I. 1983/667
- Local Government (Direct Labour Organisations) (Competition) Regulations 1983 S.I. 1983/685
- Personal Injuries (Civilians) Scheme 1983 S.I. 1983/686

== 701–800 ==
- Fresh Meat Export (Hygiene and Inspection) (Scotland) Amendment Regulations 1983 S.I. 1983/703
- The Civil Courts Order 1983 S.I. 1983/713
- Third Country Fishing (Enforcement) (No. 2) Order 1983 S.I. 1983/720
- Dogs (Northern Ireland) Order 1983 S.I. 1983/764 (N.I. 8)
- Property (Discharge of Mortgage by Receipt) (Northern Ireland) Order 1983 S.I. 1983/766 (N.I. 9)
- Rates (Amendment No. 2) (Northern Ireland) Order 1983 S.I. 1983/767 (N.I. 10)

== 801–900 ==
- Merchant Shipping (Medical Examination) Regulations 1983 S.I. 1983/808
- The County of Gloucestershire (Electoral Arrangements) Order 1983 S.I. 1983/829
- The County of Dorset (Electoral Arrangements) Order 1983 S.I. 1983/830
- The County of Oxfordshire (Electoral Arrangements) Order 1983 S.I. 1983/842
- Teachers (Compensation) (Advanced Further Education) Regulations 1983 S.I. 1983/856
- Nurses, Midwives and Health Visitors Rules 1983 S.I. 1983/873
- Naval, Military and Air Forces etc. (Disablement and Death) Service Pensions Order 1983 S.I. 1983/883
- Mental Health (Hospital Guardianship and Consent to Treatment) Regulations 1983 S.I. 1983/893

== 901–1000 ==
- Act of Adjournal (Criminal Legal Aid Fees Amendment) 1983 S.I. 1983/972
- The Kilmarnock and Loudoun District (Electoral Arrangements) Order 1983 S.I. 1983/989
- Police Pensions (Amendment) Regulations 1983 S.I. 1983/996
- Supplementary Benefit (Miscellaneous Amendments) Regulations 1983 S.I. 1983/1000

== 1001–1100 ==
- Public Trustee (Amendment) Rules 1983 (SI 1983/1050))
- Scottish Land Court (Fees) Amendment Rules 1983 (SI 1983/1058)
- The Clydebank District (Electoral Arrangements) Order 1983 (SI 1983/1059)

== 1101–1200 ==
- Merchant Shipping (Prevention of Oil Pollution) Order 1983 S.I. 1983/1106
- Criminal Attempts and Conspiracy (Northern Ireland) Order 1983 S.I. 1983/1118 (N.I. 13)
- Housing (Northern Ireland) Order 1983 S.I. 1983/1120 (N.I. 15)
- Classification and Labelling of Explosives Regulations 1983 S.I. 1983/1140
- Community Meetings (Polls) (Amendment) Rules 1983 S.I. 1983/1151
- The Clydesdale District (Electoral Arrangements) Order 1983 S.I. 1983/1197
- The Argyll and Bute District (Electoral Arrangements) Order 1983 S.I. 1983/1198

== 1201–1300 ==
- Sea Fish Licensing Order 1983 S.I. 1983/1206
- Medicines (Products Other Than Veterinary Drugs) (Prescription Only) Order 1983 S.I. 1983/1212
- Pensions Increase (Review) Order 1983 S.I. 1983/1264

== 1301–1400 ==
- The West Dorset (Parishes) Order 1983 S.I. 1983/1330
- The Allerdale and Carlisle (Areas) Order 1983 S.I. 1983/1339
- The Motherwell District (Electoral Arrangements) Order 1983 S.I. 1983/1347
- The East Hampshire and Havant (Areas) Order 1983 S.I. 1983/1376
- Measuring Equipment (Liquid Fuel delivered from Road Tankers) Regulations 1983 S.I. 1983/1390
- Merchant Shipping (Prevention of Oil Pollution) Regulations 1983 S.I. 1983/1398
- Supplementary Benefit (Requirements) Regulations 1983 S.I. 1983/1399

== 1401–1500 ==
- Explosives and Related Matters (Fees) Regulations 1983 S.I. 1983/1450
- Legal Advice and Representation (Duty Solicitor) (Remuneration) Regulations 1983 S.I. 1983/1451
- Remuneration of Teachers (Primary and Secondary Education) Order 1983 S.I. 1983/1463
- The Strathkelvin District (Electoral Arrangements) Order 1983 S.I. 1983/1489
- Seeds (National Lists of Varieties) (Fees) (Amendment No. 2) Regulations 1983 S.I. 1983/1500

== 1501–1600 ==
- North East of Birmingham–Nottingham Trunk Road, The Birmingham–Nottingham Route (Appleby Magna to Kegworth Section and Slip Roads) No. 2 Order 1983 (SI 1983/1528)
- County of Buckinghamshire (Electoral Arrangements) Order 1983 (SI 1983/1529)
- Rhondda (Communities) Order 1983 (SI 1983/1530)
- East Cambridgeshire (Parishes) Order 1983 (SI 1983/1531)
- Rugby (Parishes) Order 1983 (SI 1983/1532)
- Wyre Forest (Parishes) Order 1983 (SI 1983/1533)
- Consumer Credit Act 1974 (Commencement No. 8) Order 1983 (SI 1983/1551)
- Consumer Credit (Agreements to enter Prospective Agreements) (Exemptions) Regulations 1983 (SI 1983/1552)
- Consumer Credit (Agreements) Regulations 1983 (SI 1983/1553)
- Dumbarton District (Electoral Arrangements) Order 1983 (SI 1983/1574)
- Town and Country Planning (Structure and Local Plans) (Scotland) Regulations 1983 (SI 1983/1590) (S. 149)
- Social Security (Unemployment, Sickness and Invalidity Benefit) Regulations 1983 (SI 1983/1598)

== 1601–1700 ==
- Town and Country Planning (Use Classes) (Scotland) Amendment Order 1983 S.I. 1983/1619
- Petroleum (Regulation) Acts 1928 and 1936 (Fees) Regulations 1983 S.I. 1983/1640
- Asbestos (Licensing) Regulations 1983 S.I. 1983/1649
- Weights and Measures (Local and Working Standard Capacity Measures) Regulations 1983 S.I. 1983/1654
- The North Kesteven and West Lindsey (Areas) Order 1983 S.I. 1983/1664
- Town and Country Planning (Fees for Applications and Deemed Applications) Regulations 1983 S.I. 1983/1674

== 1701–1800 ==
- The County of Hereford and Worcester (Electoral Arrangements) Order 1983 (SI 1983/1723)
- Accounts and Audit Regulations 1983 (SI 1983/1761)
- Building Societies (Accounts and Annual Return) Regulations 1983 (SI 1983/1768)
- The Ynys Mon-Isle of Anglesey (Communities) Order 1983 (SI 1983/1788)

== 1801–1900 ==
- Insurance Companies (Accounts and Statements) Regulations 1983 (SI 1983/1811)
- The Corby (Parishes) Order 1983 (SI 1983/1839)
- The Hertsmere (Parishes) Order 1983 (SI 1983/1840)
- The Bracknell (Parishes) Order 1983 (SI 1983/1843)
- The Purbeck (Parishes) Order 1983 (SI 1983/1844)
- The Newark (Parishes) Order 1983 (SI 1983/1847)
- The Lewes (Parishes) Order 1983 (SI 1983/1867)
- The Parish of Morpeth Order 1983 (SI 1983/1868)
- The Forest Heath (Parishes) Order 1983 (SI 1983/1869)
- The Teignbridge (Parishes) Order 1983 (SI 1983/1870)
- The Boston (Parishes) Order 1983 (SI 1983/1873)
- The North West Leicestershire (Parishes) Order 1983 (SI 1983/1874)
- Consumer Credit (Increase of Monetary Limits) Order 1983 (SI 1983/1878)
- Access to the Countryside (Northern Ireland) Order 1983 (SI 1983/1895) (N.I. 18)
- Firearms (Northern Ireland) Order 1983 (SI 1983/1899) (N.I. 20)
- Fisheries (Amendment) (Northern Ireland) Order 1983 (SI 1983/1900) (N.I. 21)

== 1901–2000 ==
- Judgments Enforcement (Attachment of Debts) (Northern Ireland) Order 1983 (SI 1983/1904) (N.I. 22)
- Maidstone and Swale (Areas) Order 1983 (SI 1983/1936)
- Holderness (Parishes) Order 1983 (SI 1983/1937)
- Brentwood (Parishes) Order 1983 (SI 1983/1941)
- Gloucestershire Warwickshire Light Railway Order 1983 (SI 1983/1955)
- Adoption Agencies Regulations 1983 (SI 1983/1964)

== See also ==
- List of statutory instruments of the United Kingdom
