= Consumer Credit Act 2006 =

Act of the Parliament of the United Kingdom

Consumer Credit Act 2006 (Note: Section 71(1).)
- Act of Parliament
- Parliament of the United Kingdom
- Long title: An Act to amend the Consumer Credit Act 1974; to extend the ombudsman scheme under the Financial Services and Markets Act 2000 to cover licensees under the Consumer Credit Act 1974; and for connected purposes.
- Citation: 2006 c. 14
- Territorial extent: United Kingdom (Note: Section 71(3).)

Dates
- Royal assent: 30 March 2006
- Commencement: Various (Note: Section 71(2).)
Other legislation
Amends	Consumer Credit Act 1974
Relates to	Financial Services and Markets Act 2000

Status: Amended

History of passage through Parliament

Text of statute as originally enacted

Revised text of statute as amended

The Consumer Credit Act 2006 (c. 14) is an act of the Parliament of the United Kingdom intended to increase consumer protection when borrowing money.

== Purpose ==
The 2006 act had four main purposes:

- to improve the rights of consumers and to provide consumers with redress
- to strengthen regulation of consumer credit businesses
- to extend the coverage of regulation to all forms of consumer credit agreements
- to provide debtors with additional post-contractual information

== Provisions ==
The main provisions of the act are to extend the scope of the Consumer Credit Act 1974, to create an ombudsman scheme, and to increase the powers of the Office of Fair Trading in relation to consumer credit, including consumer credit agreements (CCA), and similar borrowing facilities. In addition, it permits borrowers to challenge unfair debtor-creditor relationships in court.

=== Consumer Credit Act 1974 ===
The 2006 act brings two further types of agreement under the scope of the 1974 act:

- Consumer agreements above £25,000, to reflect growing levels of consumer borrowing and debt;
- In section 1, to include small, one-man businesses and partnerships of up to three people.

=== Ombudsman scheme ===
The 2006 act gives consumers the option of using the Financial Ombudsman Service if they are unhappy with their lender's dispute resolution service, whether the lender consents or not. Complaints may also be raised against other types of credit related companies, such as debt-collection agencies.

=== Office of Fair Trading ===
The 2006 act empowers the Office of Fair Trading (OFT) to investigate applicants for consumer credit licences, to impose conditions on licences. The act also imposes civil penalties of up to £50,000 on companies, or £5,000 on individuals, failing to comply with its conditions. Appeal is to the First-tier Tribunal (formerly the Consumer Credit Appeals Tribunal) and thence, with leave, to the Upper Tribunal.

=== Section 71 - Short title, commencement and extent ===
The following orders have been made under section 71(2):

- The Consumer Credit Act 2006 (Commencement No. 1) Order 2006 (S.I. 2006/1508 (C. 52))
- The Consumer Credit Act 2006 (Commencement No. 2 and Transitional Provisions and Savings) Order 2007 (S.I. 2007/123 (C. 6))
- The Consumer Credit Act 2006 (Commencement No. 2 and Transitional Provisions and Savings) (Amendment) Order 2007 (S.I. 2007/387 (C. 14))
- The Consumer Credit Act 2006 (Commencement No. 3) Order 2007 (S.I. 2007/3300 (C. 136))
- The Consumer Credit Act 2006 (Commencement No. 4 and Transitional Provisions) Order 2008 (S.I. 2008/831 (C. 40))
- The Consumer Credit Act 2006 (Commencement No. 4 and Transitional Provisions) (Amendment) Order 2008 (S.I. 2008/2444 (C. 105))

== See also ==
- Credit risk
- Trade Practices Act 1974 (Australia)
- Halsbury's Statutes
