= Palmer v Simmonds =

- Citation: (1854) 2 Drew 221

Keywords
- Trusts, certainty

Palmer v Simmonds (1854) 2 Drew 221 is an English trusts law case, concerning the certainty of subject matter to create a trust. Its outcome may have become outdated by the more recent judgments in In re Roberts and Re Golay's Will Trusts.

== Facts ==
- Henrietta Rosco's will gave her residuary estate to Thomas Harrison, with the expression of confidence that if he died without issue, he would leave the bulk of her estate to William Fountain Simmonds, James Simmonds, Thomas Elrington Simmonds, and Henrietta Rosco Markham equally. - Harrison died without issue, and the question arose whether a precatory trust was created in favor of the four individuals.

== Judgment ==
The court held that the use of the word "bulk" in the will did not create a trust because it was an uncertain term, and the testatrix had not designated a clear and certain part of her estate as the subject of the trust.

== See also ==
- English trust law
