= Boyce v Boyce =

- Court: Court of Chancery
- Citation: (1849) 60 ER 959, (1849) 16 Sim 476

Keywords
- Trusts

Boyce v Boyce (1849) 60 ER 959 is an English trusts law case, concerning the certainty of subject matter. Its outcome may have become outdated by the more recent judgments in In re Roberts and Re Golay's Will Trusts.

== Facts ==
The testator left four houses on trust for his daughters, under the condition that his daughter Maria would choose the one she wanted, and the remaining three would then go to his other daughter Charlotte. Maria died before her father, and it was unknown which house she would have chosen.

== Judgment ==
In the Court of Chancery, the Vice Chancellor, held the trust failed because it was uncertain which house Maria would have chosen, and which would go to Charlotte.

== See also ==
- English trust law
