= Minshull v Minshull =

English trusts law case

- Court: Court of Chancery
- Citation: (1737) 26 ER 260

Case opinions
- Lord Hardwicke LC

Keywords
- Wills, devises, certainty, construction

Minshull v Minshull (1737) 26 ER 260 is an English trusts law case, concerning the principle of certainty for a will, known then as a "devise".

== Facts ==
Richard Lester wrote a testament to devise a house to the eldest son of his nephew, Randal Minshull, and in default other male heirs (the eldest was another Randal, the second John). It said:

I give and devise the house, &c., to Randal Minshull, eldest son of my nephew Randal Minshull, and the first heirs males of his body lawfully begotten, and the heirs males of his body, and in default of such issue, I give, &c., to the second son of the said Randal Minshull, and the heirs males of his body and their issues; remainder over, &c.

There was also a provision that whoever inherited should pay other brothers and sisters £20 a piece. Randal died without children. It passed to John, who gave the property to his youngest son, instead of his eldest son. The question was whether this was allowed, or the will had meant the second son of the second Randall Minshull (i.e. not Richard Lester's nephew, but Richard Lester's nephew's son). Those potential inheritors were claiming for rents.

== Judgment ==
Lord Hardwicke LC held that the will was valid, and on the true construction, the property was to pass to John's sons.

This case will depend on the words of the will with regard to the person intended by the testator, by the name of Randal, and the legal operation of the words made use of; and a Court never construes a devise void, unless it is so absolutely dark, that they cannot find out the testator's meaning.

The provision for the payment of the legacies (by the person to whom the estate should come) to his brothers and sisters, and to John, &c., is, as has been insisted on for the plaintiff, a very strong expression of the intent of the party; for as here is a specification of the children, it must mean the brothers and sisters of Randal Minshull, the eldest son of Randal Minshull the nephew, and could never intend to mean every taker. For, supposing the words to mean the second son of the devisee, as there is plainly an estate-tail created prior to any interest he can claim (whether the words first heirs-male are construed words of limitation or purchase), an estate which may continue for a great number of years, in all probability, without any failure of issue, it would be a most absurd thing to charge a person, at so great a distance from the estate, with the payment of money to persons then in being, whom the testator could hardly suppose would be living at the time of the title accruing to such second son. On the other hand there is nothing extraordinary in charging Randal the first devisee, or upon a supposition of his death without issue, in the life-time of John, in charging John with the payment of those sums, which raises a very strong presumption, that John was the person intended to take under the limitation to the second son of Randal.

It has been objected against this construction, that John will then be devisee of the estate, and entitled to the £20 likewise, which the testator could never intend; but the words must be taken reddendo singula singulis, and John to have the £20 only in case of the first devisee's right taking effect in possession, and the determination of the preceding estates then in being at the time of making the will. It is much more natural likewise that the testator, when he was making a disposition of his whole estate, having a nephew who had two sons, should settle it successively on both the sons, than stop at the first, without extending the entail, or disposing of the reversion.

Whether the first devisee was tenant for life, or in tail, is a question proper to be considered, and the determination of that point will certainly give great light into this matter, and clear the way towards the construction of the will on the other point, in the manner it has been insisted on.

I am of opinion that the words of limitation superadded here to the preceding words of limitation, will certainly not of themselves, make the first words of purchase, but the subsequent ought to be rejected as redundant and superfluous.

In Archer's case (1 Co. 66 b), an estate was limited to Robert Archer, the first taker, expressly for life, to which great regard is always had in determining whether an estate for life, or in tail, passes. 2dly, In that case it was to the next heir male of Robert only, not heirs as here; nor will the subsequent words of limitation affect the legal operation of the preceding words in any case of this kind, unless the word heir is made use of in the singular number, or there is an express estate for life limited to the first taker. It is true, in Shelley's case (1 Co. 93 b, and 95 b), Anderson, Chief Justice, puts this case. "If there be a limitation to the use of a man for life, and after his decease to the use of his heirs, and of their heirs-female of their bodies"; in this case, these words (his heirs) are words of purchase and not of limitation, for then the subsequent words (and of their heirs-female of their bodies) would be void. That appears to be a case only put by Anderson, and no resolution of that kind; but besides these the subsequent words vary essentially the preceding limitations, and alter the course of succession and enjoyment of the estate.

There are subsequent words of limitation annexed likewise to the devise to the second son, which shews the testator had no intention they should operate in destruction of the former words. No stress at all is to be laid on the word first; there are many authorities for that purpose, and the case of Dubber v. Trollop is a very strong one; there the word heir too was used, not heirs. The word first means only that they should take in succession, according to priority of birth and seniority of age, and is unnecessarily providing for what the law itself does.

Decreed for the plaintiff. (Decreed that the premises were devised in remainder to John Minshull, the second son of Randal Minshull the father, which John was father of the now plaintiff. Reg. Lib. B. 1737, fo. 144).

== Significance ==
- Robinson v Robinson (1756) 96 ER 999, Lord Mansfield took over the case upon Ryder CJ's death, and held a will valid, "to effectuate the manifest general intent of the testator". It appeared that Ryder CJ was tending the opposite way, remarking "The general question is on the will, which is so dark, and obscure, that I defy any one, lawyer, or not, to say, with any certainty, what the testator intended."
- Doe d. Winter v Perratt (1843) 9 Cl&F 606, 689, Lord Brougham said: 'The difficulty must be so great that it amounts to an impossibility, the doubt so grave that there is not even an inclination of the scales one way'
- In re Roberts (1881) 19 ChD 520, 529, Sir George Jessel MR said that the court would not hold a will void for uncertainty 'unless it is utterly impossible to put a meaning upon it. The duty of the court is to put a fair meaning on the terms used, and not, as was said in one case, to repose on the easy pillow of saying that the whole is void for uncertainty'
- Fawcett Properties Ltd v Buckingham County Council [1961] AC 636
- Re Tuck's Settlement Trusts [1977] EWCA Civ 11

== See also ==
- English trust law
