= Housing Act 1957 =

Act of the Parliament of the United Kingdom

Housing Act 1957 (Note: Section 193(1).)
- Act of Parliament
- Parliament of the United Kingdom
- Long title: An Act to consolidate the enactments relating to housing with the exception of certain provisions relating to financial matters.
- Citation: 5 & 6 Eliz. 2. c. 56
- Territorial extent: England and Wales (Note: Section 193(3).)

Dates
- Royal assent: 31 July 1957
- Commencement: 1 September 1957 (Note: Section 193(2).)
- Repealed: 1 April 1986
Other legislation
| Amends | See § Repealed enactments |
| Repeals/revokes | See § Repealed enactments |
| Amended by | County Courts Act 1959; Highways Act 1959; Charities Act 1960; Land Compensation Act 1961; Landlord and Tenant Act 1962; London Government Act 1963; Public Works Loans Act 1964; Industrial and Provident Societies Act 1965; Compulsory Purchase Act 1965; Rent Act 1965; Rent Act 1968; Wild Creatures and Forest Laws Act 1971; Gas Act 1972; Housing Rents and Subsidies Act 1975; Statute Law (Repeals) Act 1977; Statute Law (Repeals) Act 1978; Acquisition of Land Act 1981 |
| Repealed by | Housing (Consequential Provisions) Act 1985 |
| Relates to | Housing (Financial Provisions) Act 1958 |

Status: Repealed

Text of statute as originally enacted

The Housing Act 1957 (5 & 6 Eliz. 2. c. 56) was an act of the Parliament of the United Kingdom that consolidated enactments relating to housing in England and Wales.

== Provisions ==
=== Repealed enactments ===
Section 191(1) of the act repealed 18 enactments, listed in the eleventh schedule to the act.

| Citation | Short title | Extent of repeal |
|---|---|---|
| 14 & 15 Geo. 5. c. 35 | Housing (Financial Provisions) Act 1924 | In section fourteen, subsection (1). |
| 21 & 22 Geo. 5. c. 39 | Housing (Rural Authorities) Act 1931 | Sections two and three. |
| 25 & 26 Geo. 5. c. 40 | Housing Act 1935 | Section sixty-two. |
| 26 Geo. 5 & 1 Edw. 8. c. 51 | Housing Act 1936 | Parts I to IV. In Part V— Sections seventy-one to eighty-five. Section eighty-six except so far as it relates to exchequer contributions. Sections eighty-seven and eighty-eight. In section eighty-nine, subsection (1) and in subsection (2) the words from the beginning to the words " think proper ". Section ninety-three. In section ninety-four, subsections (1), (2), (5) and (6). Section ninety-five to the end of Part V. In Part VI— Sections one hundred and sixteen to one hundred and eighteen. Section one hundred and nineteen except as applied by section forty-seven of the Housing Act, 1949. Sections one hundred and twenty and one hundred and twenty-one. Sections one hundred and twenty-two to one hundred and twenty-four except as applied by section forty-seven of the Housing Act, 1949. Sections one hundred and twenty-six and one hundred and twenty-seven. In Part VII— Sections one hundred and thirty-five to one hundred and fifty-two. Sections one hundred and fifty-four to one hundred and sixty-eight. Section one hundred and seventy-five. In section one hundred and seventy-eight, subsection (2). Section one hundred and seventy-nine. Section one hundred and eighty-one to the end of Part VII. In Part VIII— Section one hundred and eighty-seven. The First, Second, Third, Fourth and Fifth Schedules. The Ninth Schedule. The Eleventh Schedule. |
| 1 & 2 Geo. 6. c. 16 | Housing (Financial Provisions) Act 1938 | In section two, subsection (2). |
| 8 & 9 Geo. 6. c. 18 | Local Authorities Loans Act 1945 | In section six, paragraph (c). |
| 9 & 10 Geo. 6. c. 48 | Housing (Financial and Miscellaneous Provisions) Act 1946 | In section nineteen, subsections (1) and (2). Section twenty-two. |
| 9 & 10 Geo. 6. c. 49 | Acquisition of Land (Authorisation Procedure) Act 1946 | In section one, paragraph (b) of subsection (4). In Part I of the Second Schedule the words "in the case of a purchase under the Housing Act, 1936, and " and the word " other " in sub-paragraph (b) of paragraph 2. In the Fourth Schedule the amendments of the Housing Act, 1936. |
| 12, 13 & 14 Geo. 6. c. 60 | Housing Act 1949 | Sections two and three. Sections six to fourteen. In section thirty-one, subsections (1) and (2). |
| 15 & 16 Geo. 6 & 1 Eliz. 2. c. 17 | Industrial and Provident Societies Act 1952 | In section one, in subsection (1), paragraph (d). |
| 15 & 16 Geo. 6 & 1 Eliz. 2. c. 53 | Housing Act 1952 | In section three, subsections (1), (2), (3) and (4). Sections four and five. |
| 1 & 2 Eliz. 2. c. 26 | Local Government (Miscellaneous Provisions) Act 1953 | Sections ten and eleven. |
| 1 & 2 Eliz. 2. c. xliii | London County Council (General Powers) Act 1953 | Section forty. |
| 2 & 3 Eliz. 2. c. 8 | Electoral Registers Act 1953 | In the list at the end of the Schedule the words "the Housing Act, 1936". |
| 2 & 3 Eliz. 2. c. 53 | Housing Repairs and Rents Act 1954 | Section one. In section two, subsections (1), (2), (4) and (5) and, except so far as it amends section seven of that Act, subsection (3). Sections three to six. Section nine except as applied by paragraph 11 of the Second Schedule to the Housing Act, 1949. Sections ten to fourteen. Sections twenty and twenty-one. In section twenty-two, subsections (2) and (3). In section thirty-three, subsection (7). In section fifty, in subsection (2), paragraphs (a) and (b). The First Schedule. |
| 4 & 5 Eliz. 2. c. 33 | Housing Subsidies Act 1956 | In section twelve, subsection (5). In the First Schedule, paragraph 9 so far as it amends subsection (1) of section nineteen of the Housing (Financial and Miscellaneous Provisions) Act, 1946. |
| 4 & 5 Eliz. 2. c. 57 | Slum Clearance (Compensation) Act 1956 | Section one as it applies to a house purchased compulsorily under the powers contained in this Act, and in subsection (1) the words from " or vacated " to " closing order" and the words " or, as the case may be, vacated ", in subsection (2) the words " or in pursuance of a clearance order, demolition order or closing order " and the words from " and, in the case " to the end of the subsection, in subsection (3) the words " or, as the case may be, vacated ", in subsection (4) the words " or, as the case may be, vacated ", paragraph (b) and the words " in either case ". Section two as it applies to a house purchased compulsorily under the powers contained in this Act, and in subsection (1) the words " or vacated in pursuance of a clearance order or demolition order ". Section three. In section four, subsection (1), and in subsection (2), the definitions of "clearance order", " closing order ", " demolition order ", and in the definition of " material period " paragraphs (a), (c), (d) and (e) and in paragraph (b) the words from " a house authorised " to " so fit, or ". In section six, in subsection (1), the words from " and shall " to the end of the subsection. |
| 5 & 6 Eliz. 2. c. 25 | Rent Act 1957 | In the Sixth Schedule, paragraph 22. |

== Subsequent developments ==
The whole act was repealed by section 3(1) of, and schedule 1 to, the Housing (Consequential Provisions) Act 1985, which came into force on 1 April 1986.
