= Public housing in the United Kingdom =

British government and local authority housing programmes

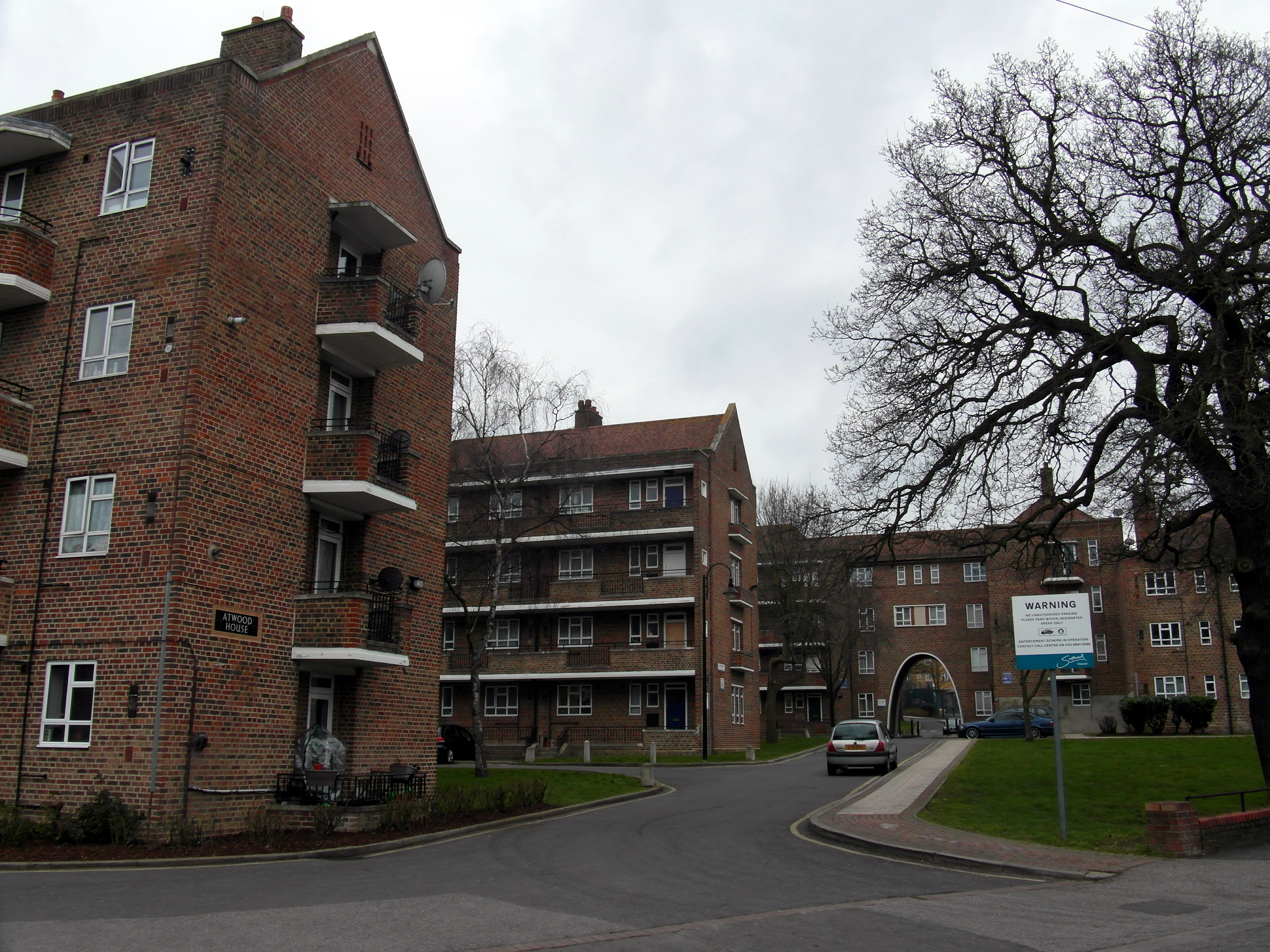
- Public housing on Kingswood Estate built by the London County Council in the post-war period

General information
- Location: United Kingdom
- Population: 17% of UK population (2024)

Construction
- Constructed: 1919–present

Other information
- Famous residents: Bob Crow; Eddie Dempsey; David Olusoga

Public housing in the United Kingdom, also known as council housing or social housing, provided the majority of rented accommodation until 2011, when the number of households in private rental housing surpassed the number in social housing. Dwellings built for public or social housing use are built by or for local authorities and known as council houses. Since the 1980s, non-profit housing associations (HA) became more important and subsequently the term "social housing" became widely used — as technically, council housing only refers to properties owned by a local authority — as this embraces both council and HA properties, though the terms are largely used interchangeably.

Before 1865, housing for the poor was provided solely by the private sector. Council houses were then built on council estates — known as schemes in Scotland — where other amenities, like schools and shops, were often also provided. From the 1950s, alongside large developments of terraced and semi-detached housing, blocks of low-rise of flats and maisonettes were widely built. By the 1960s, the emphasis on construction changed to high-rise tower blocks, which carried on to a much lesser degree in the early 1970s. The 1970s saw a switch back to houses, these mainly being detached and semi-detached, as the large-scale council housing expansion came to a halt by the 1980s.

Council houses and flats were often built in mixed estates as part of the transfer to public sector redevelopment following the slum clearances of the private rented back-to-backs of the inner city, along with the large number of overspill estates vastly expanding the outskirts of all cities into the surrounding rural countryside. Council housing was core to the three waves of development in 20th-century of the new town movement of urbanisation — with places such as:

- in the first wave:
  - Cumbernauld, Dunbartonshire
  - Harlow, Essex
  - Hemel Hempstead, Hertfordshire
- in the second wave:
  - Craigavon, County Armagh
  - Livingston, West Lothian
  - Redditch, Worcestershire
- with the third wave developing:
  - Milton Keynes, Buckinghamshire
  - Telford, Shropshire
  - Warrington, Cheshire

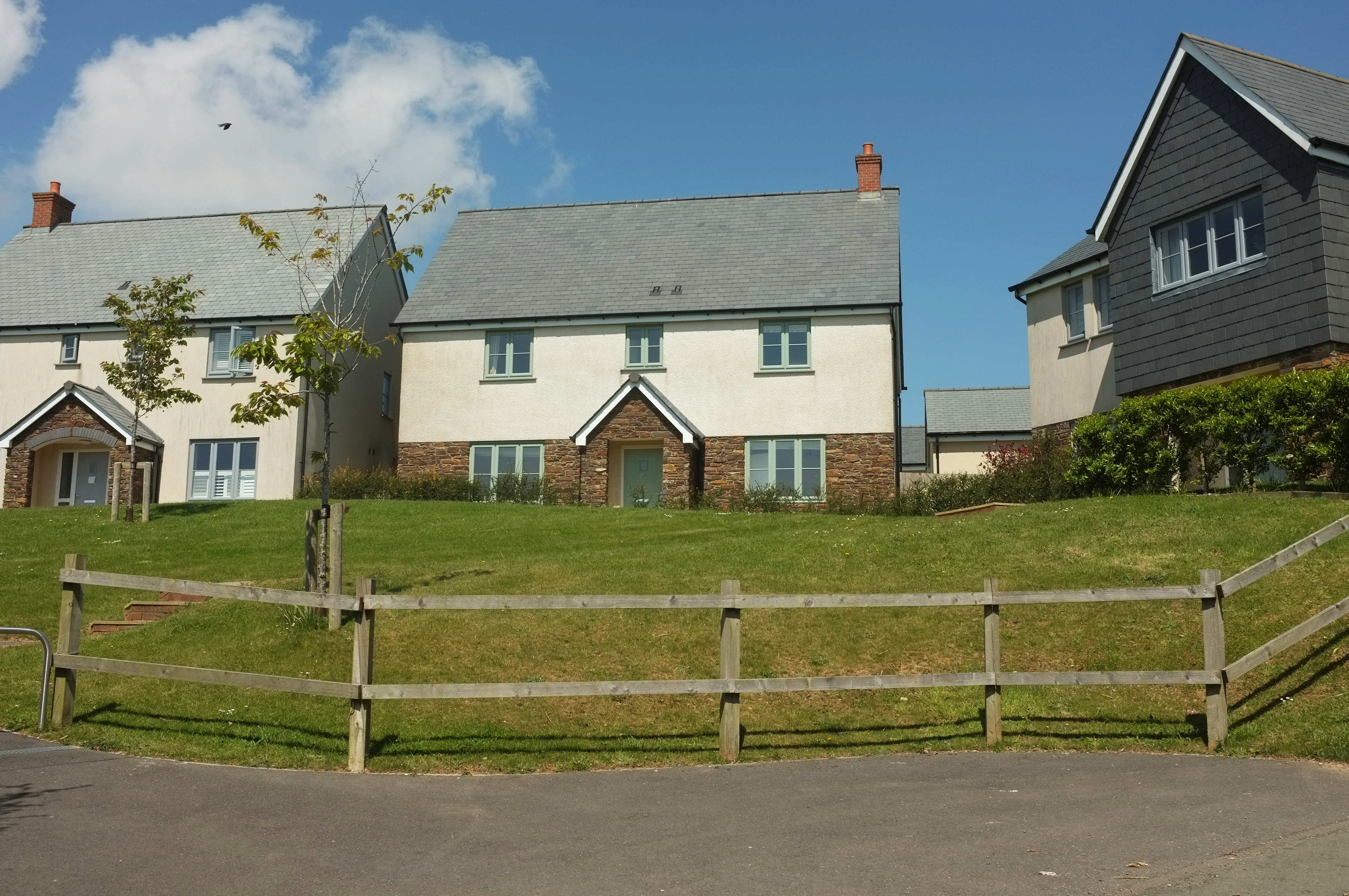
Modern public houses in Loddiswell

Council homes were built to supply uncrowded, well-built homes on secure tenancies at reasonable rents to primarily working-class people. Council housing in the mid-20th century included many large suburban council estates, featuring terraced and semi-detached houses, where other amenities like schools and shops were often also provided. By the late 1970s, almost a third of UK households lived in social housing.

Since 1980 council housing stock has been sold to private occupiers under the Right to Buy legislation, and new social housing has mainly been developed and managed by housing associations. A substantial part of the UK population still lives in council housing; in 2024, about 17% of UK households. Approximately 55% of the country's social housing stock is owned by local authorities. Increasingly the stock is managed on a day-to-day basis by arms-length management organisations rather than directly by the authority, and by housing associations. Both Scotland and Wales have since scrapped their Right to Buy policies.

== History ==
Public housing became needed to provide "homes fit for heroes" in 1919, then to enable slum clearance. Standards were set to ensure high-quality homes, with the 'garden suburb' model predominating, with its emphasis on low density housing with domestic gardens and lots of green space. Aneurin Bevan, a Labour politician, passionately believed that council houses should be provided for all, while the Conservative politician Harold Macmillan saw council housing "as a stepping stone to home ownership". The Conservative government of Margaret Thatcher introduced Right to Buy in 1979, with the millionth council house being sold within seven years. By 2024, over 2 million council homes had been sold under the scheme in England alone, with receipts totalling over £50 billion. In time, the transfer of public housing stock to private ownership reached the point where councils had to rent back their own houses to house the homeless.

=== Before council housing ===
Even in the stable medieval model of landowner and peasant, where estate workers lived at the landowner's whim in a tied cottage, the aged and infirm needed provision from their former employer, the church or the state.

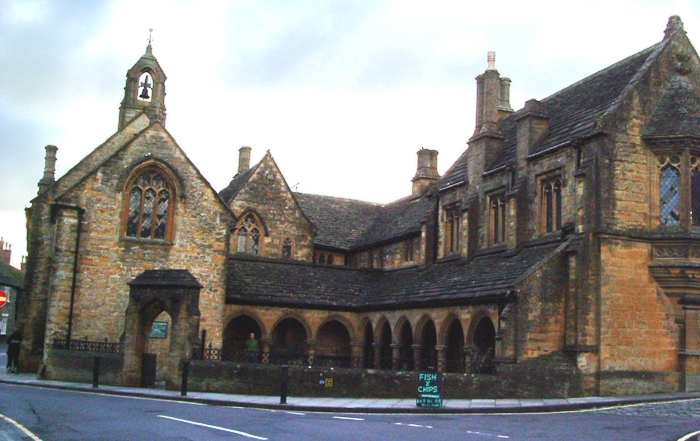
The Almshouse at Sherborne, Dorset

==== Almshouses ====
The documented history of social housing in Britain starts with almshouses, which were established from the 10th century, to provide a place of residence for "poor, old and distressed folk". The first recorded almshouse was founded in York by King Æthelstan; the oldest still in existence is the Hospital of St. Cross in Winchester, dating to c. 1133.

==== Workhouses ====
The public workhouse was the final fallback solution for the destitute. Rural poverty had been greatly increased by the inclosure acts leaving many in need of assistance. This was divided into outside relief, or handouts to keep the family together, and inside relief, which meant submitting to the workhouse. The workhouse provided for two groups of people – the transient population roaming the country looking for seasonal work, and the long-term residents. The two were kept separate where possible. The long-term residents included single elderly men incapable of further labour, and young women with their children—often women who had been abandoned by their husbands, single mothers and servant-girls who had been dismissed from residential positions.

==== Migration to the city ====
The pressure for decent housing was increased by overcrowding in the large cities during the Industrial Revolution of the 19th century; many social commentators (such as Octavia Hill) reported on the squalor, sickness and immorality that arose. Some industrialists and independent organisations provided housing in tenement blocks, while some philanthropist factory owners built entire villages for their workers, such as Saltaire (1853), Bournville (1879) and Port Sunlight (1888).

=== Council-built housing ===
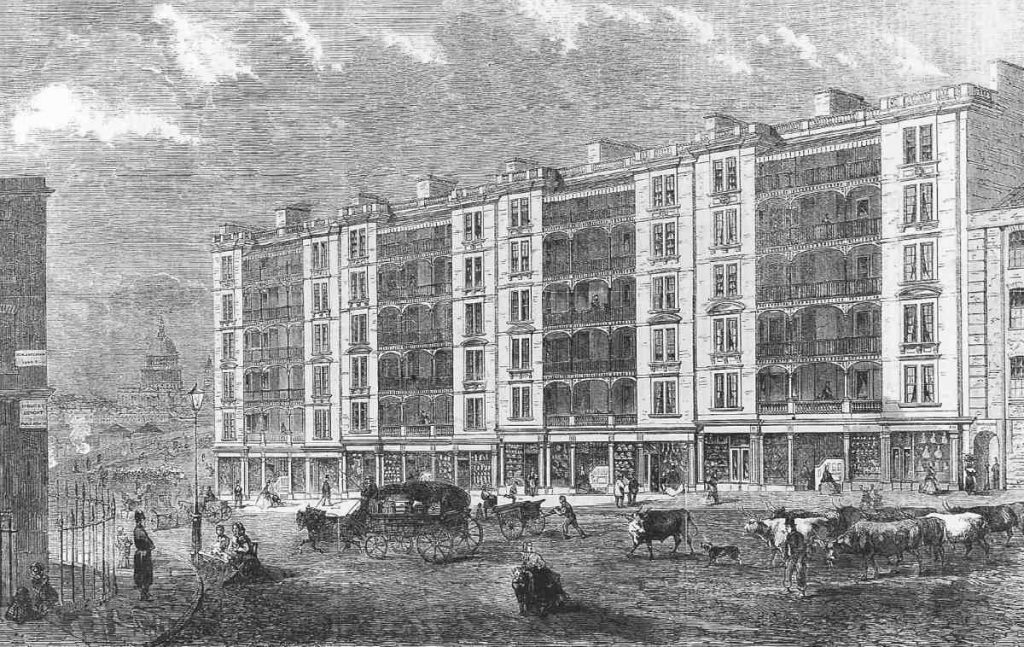
Corporation Buildings, Farringdon Road in 1865

The City of London Corporation built tenements in Farringdon Road in 1865, but this was an isolated instance. The first council to build housing as an integrated policy was Liverpool Corporation, starting with St Martin's Cottages in Ashfield Street, Vauxhall, completed in 1869. The Corporation then built Victoria Square Dwellings, opened by Home Secretary Sir Richard Cross in 1885.

That year, a royal commission was held, as the state had taken an interest in housing and housing policy. This led to the Housing of the Working Classes Act 1890 (53 & 54 Vict. c. 70), which encouraged the London authority to improve the housing in their areas. It also gave them the power to acquire land and to build tenements and houses (cottages). As a consequence, London County Council opened the Boundary Estate in 1900, a 'block dwelling estate' of tenements in Tower Hamlets. The Housing of the Working Classes Act 1900 extended these power to all local councils, which then began building tenements and houses.

=== Homes fit for heroes – interwar policy ===
In 1912, Raymond Unwin published a pamphlet Nothing gained by Overcrowding. He worked on the influential Tudor Walters Report of 1918, which recommended housing in short terraces, spaced 70 feet (21 m) apart at a density of 12 per acre (30/ha). The First World War indirectly provided a new impetus, when the poor physical health and condition of many urban recruits to the army was noted with alarm. This led to a campaign under the slogan "Homes fit for heroes". In 1919, the Government first required councils to provide housing, built to the Tudor Walters standards, under the Housing, Town Planning, &c. Act 1919 (9 & 10 Geo. 5. c. 35) (the Addison Act), helping them to do so through the provision of subsidies. The war had caused house building costs to rise enormously: Sir Ernest Simon reported to the Manchester Housing Committee in 1910 that "houses that had cost £250 to build pre war were then costing £1,250, so the economic rent was 30/- a week but had to be let at 12/6d".

The provision of local authority housing varied throughout the UK; in the period 1919–39 67% of the houses built in Scotland were in the public sector, compared to 26% in England.

==== LCC cottage estates ====
London County Council embraced these freedoms and planned eight 'cottage estates' in the peripheries of London: Becontree, St Helier, Downham for example; seven further followed including Bellingham. Many houses were built over the next few years in 'cottage estates'. Houses were built on green field land on the peripheries of the urban area.

==== Subsidies for private provision ====
Housing, &c. Act 1923 (Note: Section 24(1).)
- Act of Parliament
- Parliament of the United Kingdom
- Long title: An Act to amend the enactments relating to the Housing of the Working Classes (including the amendment and revocation of building byelaws), Town Planning and the Acquisition of Small Dwellings.
- Citation: 13 & 14 Geo. 5. c. 24
- Territorial extent: England and Wales; Scotland; (Note: Section 24(2).)

Dates
- Royal assent: 31 July 1923
- Commencement: 31 July 1923 (Note: The Acts of Parliament (Commencement) Act 1793.)
- Repealed: Scotland: 21 May 1981; England and Wales: 1 April 1986
Other legislation
| Amends | Housing, Town Planning, etc. Act 1909; Housing Act 1921 |
| Amended by | Housing (Financial Provisions) Act 1924; Housing Act 1925; Housing (Scotland) Act 1925; Town Planning Act 1925; Town Planning (Scotland) Act 1925; Housing Act 1930; Housing (Scotland) Act 1930; Local Government Act 1933; Housing Act 1935; Local Government (Scotland) Act 1947; Housing (Financial Provisions) Act 1958 |
| Repealed by | Scotland: Statute Law (Repeals) Act 1981; England and Wales:Housing (Consequential Provisions) Act 1985 |

Status: Repealed

Text of statute as originally enacted

The Addison Act provided subsidies solely to local authorities and not to private builders. After the Geddes Axe advocated economies in social spending, the Housing, &c. Act 1923 (13 & 14 Geo. 5. c. 24) (the Chamberlain Act) stopped subsidies going to council houses but extended the subsidies to private builders. Following the line of the railways, predominantly private estates were built on cheap agricultural land; building houses that the professional classes with an income of £300–500 a year were able to afford. These pattern-book houses, put up speculatively by companies such as Wimpey, Costain, Laing and Taylor Woodrow, were mocked by Osbert Lancaster as "By-pass Variegated". Large council estates following the line of the radial roads. This marked a further movement out of the city, first by the middle classes and then the blue-collar workers, leaving just the poorest layer of society living in the urban area.

The first Labour government was returned in 1924. The Housing (Financial Provisions) Act 1924 (Wheatley Act) restored subsidies to municipal housing but at a lower level, it failed to make any provision for lower paid, who were living in the worse conditions, and could not afford to pay the higher rents of the new houses, or travel to or from them to work. They continued in substandard housing circling the urban core; in Manchester, for example, this 'slum belt' was about half a mile wide.

=== Statutory slum clearance plans ===
While new council housing had been built, little had been done to resolve the problem of inner-city slums, which could also be found in many smaller towns. This was to change with the Housing Act 1930 (Greenwood Act), which required councils to prepare slum clearance plans, and some progress was made before the Second World War intervened.

=== Post-war reconstruction phase ===
During the Second World War almost four million British homes were destroyed or damaged, and afterwards there was a major boom in council house construction. The bomb damage from the war only worsened the condition of Britain's housing stock, which was in poor condition before its outbreak. Before the war many social housing projects, such as the Quarry Hill Flats in Leeds were built. However, the bomb damage meant that much greater progress had to be made with slum clearance projects. In heavily bombed cities like London, Coventry and Kingston upon Hull, the redevelopment schemes were often larger and more radical.

In the immediate post-war years, and well into the 1950s, council house provision was shaped by the New Towns Act 1946 (9 & 10 Geo. 6. c. 68) and the Town and Country Planning Act 1947 of the 1945–51 Labour government. Simultaneously, this government introduced housing legislation that removed explicit references to housing for the working class and introduced the concept of "general needs" construction (i.e., that council housing should aim to fill the needs of a wide range of society). In particular, Aneurin Bevan, the Minister for Health and Housing, promoted a vision of new estates where "the working man, the doctor and the clergyman will live in close proximity to each other".

While a number of large cities tentatively erected their first high-rise developments (e.g., Aston Cross in Birmingham, Churchill Gardens in Westminster), in England and Wales homes were typically semi-detached or in small terraces. A three-bedroom semi-detached council house was typically built on a square grid 21 feet (6.4 m) on the side, with a maximum density of houses of no more than 12 per acre (30/ha), that is to say around 337 square metres (403 sq yd) per house. As a result, most houses had generous space around them. The new towns and many existing towns had countless estates built to this basic model. In Scotland, the tradition of tenement living meant that most homes of this period were built in low-rise (3–4) storey blocks of flats.

For many working-class people, this housing model provided their first experience of private indoor toilets, private bathrooms and hot running water, as well as gardens and electric lighting. For tenants in England and Wales it also usually provided the first experience of private garden space (usually front and rear). The quality of these houses, and in particular the existence of small gardens in England and Wales, compared very favourably with social housing being built on the European continent in this period.

=== Focusing on a new urban vision ===
The 1951 Conservative government began to re-direct the building programme back from "general needs" towards "welfare accommodation for low income earners" The principal focus was on inner-city slum clearance, completing the job that was started in the 1930s. Harold Macmillan's task, as Minister for Housing, was to deliver 300,000 houses a year. These were 700 square feet (65 m^{2}), 20% smaller than a Tudor Walters Bevan house, usually built as a two-bedroom terrace called "The Peoples House". From 1956, with the Housing Subsidy Act 1956 the government subsidy was restricted to only new houses built to replace those removed by slum clearance, and more money was given to tower blocks higher than six stories. With this subsidy, neighbourhoods throughout the country were demolished and rebuilt as mixed estates with low and high-rise building. At the same time the rising influence of modernist architecture, the development of new cheaper construction techniques, such as system building (a form of prefabrication), and a growing desire by many towns and cities to retain population (and thus rental income and local rates) within their own boundaries (rather than "export" people to New Towns and "out of boundary" peripheral estates) led to this model being adopted; abandoned inner-city areas were demolished, and estates of high-rise apartments blocks proliferated on vacant sites. Whole working class communities were scattered, and the tenants either relocated themselves to neighbouring overcrowded properties or became isolated away from friends in flats and houses, on estates without infrastructure or a bus-route.

Glasgow led the way and others followed. Tower blocks became the preferred model. The councils visited Marseille and saw the results of Charles Édouard Jenneret's (Le Corbusier's) vision. The argument was advanced that more generously sized dwellings could be provided this way, that communities could be re-housed close to existing employment opportunities and there would be far less disruption to local shopping and leisure patterns. During the 1950s and 1960s, the number of high-rise dwellings rose significantly. In 1953, just 23% of public-sector approvals were for flats, with only 3% high-rise (defined as blocks of six stories or more). By 1966, however, high-rise housing accounted for 26% of all homes started. A National Dwelling and Housing Survey carried out in 1977 also found higher levels of housing satisfaction amongst owner occupiers than council housing tenants. The survey found that 90% of owner occupiers were "satisfied" or "very satisfied" with their accommodation and only 4% "dissatisfied" or "very dissatisfied", while for council tenants the equivalent figures were 74% and 14%, respectively.

Subsequent research at the London School of Economics has tried to cast doubt on claims that only high rise developments could accommodate the population density required for these policies.

The post-war governments considered the provision of as much new housing as possible to be a major part of post-war policy, and provided subsidies for local authorities to build such housing. The Conservatives competed with Labour for the popular vote over who could build more houses, abandoning Bevan's principle that numbers weren't enough – that the homes had to be spacious and well built, too.

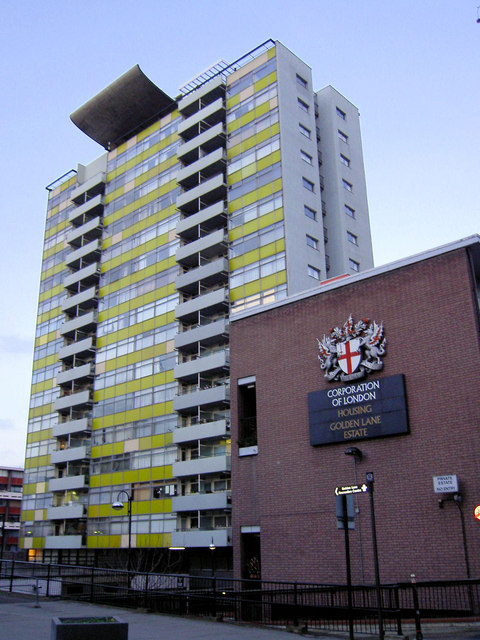
Great Arthur House, at the centre of the Golden Lane Estate, was the tallest residential building in Britain at the time of its construction.

The use of system building methods was later seen as possibly being a short-sighted, false economy, as many of the later houses are in a poor state of repair or have been demolished. On many estates, older council houses, with their largely superior build quality, have outlived them – more incredibly, they have even been outlasted by a large percentage of Edwardian and late Victorian private houses.

A number of types of system building used in flats have serious flaws. They were initially very popular with tenants due to their generous space standards, and with councillors and housing officials due to their speed of construction – but have suffered problems, especially poor protection from damp and weather ingress, as well as other design defects and poor management. Also, studies such as Family and Kinship in East London found that people moving to such estates lost their old social networks and failed to develop new ones. As noted by one study:

"There was, however, one way in which slum clearance rather than enhancing housing standards actually threatened to reduce them: the building by experimented prefabricated methods, of large impersonal estates of high-rise buildings, lacking many of the amenities common in similar developments on the continent."

The last major push in council home provision was made under the Wilson government of 1964. The energetic Minister of Housing Richard Crossman accepted the truth that the provision rate was too slow and instructed authorities to exercise their compulsory purchase powers and construct large overspill estates. In Birmingham he forced the building of Castle Vale and the 15,590 dwelling Chelmsley Wood estate, Solihull.

=== Right to buy ===
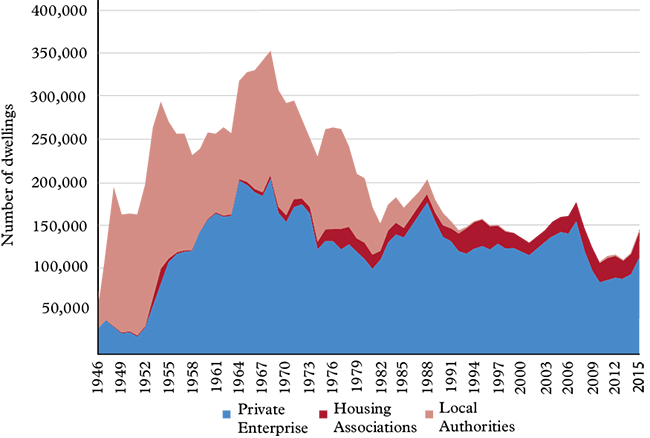
Permanent dwellings completed in England by tenure type, showing the effect of the 1980 Housing Act in curtailing council house construction and reducing total new build numbers

Laws restricted councils' investment in housing, preventing them subsidising it from local taxes, but more importantly, council tenants were given the Right to Buy in the Housing Act 1980 offering a discount price on their council house. Proposed as policy by Prime Minister Margaret Thatcher and carried out under the remit of Secretary of State for the Environment Michael Heseltine, the Right To Buy scheme allowed tenants to buy their home with a discount of 33–50% off the market value, depending on the time they had lived there. Councils were prevented from reinvesting the proceeds of these sales in new housing, and the total available stock, particularly of more desirable homes, declined.

The policy resulted in a selective uptake, with middle-aged and married skilled workers with mature children being the most likely to purchase their homes. In effect, those in extreme poverty did not have the option to avail the offer, exacerbating the social and economic inequalities prevalent in the sector. Furthermore, the price of private increased due to the rent deregulation policies that were implemented simultaneously. This made it increasingly difficult for those excluded from the policy to afford alternatives, leaving them with the least desirable residual sector of social housing. Over time, changes were made to the Right to Buy policy, especially for specific regions but overall, the policy reinforced the stigmatized position of public/social housing as a 'last resort', moving away from the previous welfare-statist ideals.

The "right to buy" was popular with many former Labour voters and, although the Labour government of Tony Blair tightened the rules (reducing the maximum discount in areas of most housing need), it did not end the right-to-buy. Labour did relax the policy forbidding reinvestment of sales proceeds.

Following its election in 2015, the Conservative government has announced proposals to extend the Right to Buy to housing association tenants.

While social housing is being sold off under right to buy, new social homes are not being built to replace it and waiting lists for social housing have become very long, up to 18 years. Over a million people are on the social housing waiting list and a quarter of people on social housing waiting lists have been there for 5 years or more. The number of social homes is at a record low, over 100,000 households were on council waiting lists for over 10 years. Council houses sold under right to buy are typically sold at half market value, some of the money from the sale has to go to the Treasury. Councils can replace only one in three of homes sold under right to buy. It is felt that the loss of social homes to local councils has meant an increase in the use of temporary accommodation types, a form of emergency accommodation expected to cost councils £4bn by 2029/30.

=== Stock transfer ===
The Housing Acts of 1985 and 1988 facilitated the transfer of council housing to not-for-profit housing associations. The 1988 Act redefined housing associations as non-public bodies, permitting access to private finance, which was a strong motivation for transfer as public sector borrowing had been severely constrained. These housing associations were also the providers of most new public-sector housing. By 2003 36.5% of the social rented housing stock was held by housing associations. In some council areas referendums on changing ownership were won by opponents of government policy, preventing transfers to housing associations.

The Wakefield district council found itself unable to maintain its supply of council housing and transferred it all to a housing association, in 2004; this represented the second largest stock transfer in British history. Housing rented from the council accounted for about 28% of the district and around 40% of the actual city of Wakefield.

Many districts of the country have less than 10% of housing rented from the council; the national average stood at 14%.

=== Renewal and regeneration ===
On 16 May 1968, the problems associated with tower blocks were brought into sharp focus after the partial collapse of Ronan Point, a system-built tower block in Newham, east London, as a consequence of a gas explosion. A similar incident caused significant damage to one side of a block in Manchester. Although these incidents were due to a series of failures (not least being the illegal connection of gas cookers by unqualified friends of tenants), subsequently all system-built tower blocks were usually built with "all electric" heating, to prevent the occurrence of such an explosion.

The same year Manchester started the construction of the Hulme Crescents. Thirteen tower blocks connected by aerial walkways and the four long curving south facing blocks of flats and maisonettes connected by walkways and bridges. Five thousand homes were constructed in eight years. Three thousand of these were the deck access flats, almost immediately the constructional problems became apparent: they leaked, ducting failed and they were too expensive to heat. A child died falling from a deck and by 1975, and they were declared unsuitable for families with children, the elderly and the disabled. In 1975, 96.3% of the residents wanted to leave. 643 families petitioned to be rehoused. They were demolished between 1991 and 1994.

Proportion of houses and flats built by local authorities and New Towns in England and Wales, 1960–80 (a)

| Year | Houses (%) | Flats (b) 2–4-storey (%) | Flats 5–14-storey | Flats 15-storey and over | Total flats |
|---|---|---|---|---|---|
| 1960 | 52.8 | 33.0 | 11.1 | 3.1 | 47.2 |
| 1961 | 51.3 | 32.2 | 12.7 | 3.8 | 48.7 |
| 1962 | 50.1 | 32.6 | 12.3 | 5.0 | 49.9 |
| 1963 | 46.9 | 31.2 | 12.9 | 9.0 | 53.1 |
| 1964 | 44.8 | 31.0 | 12.2 | 12.0 | 55.2 |
| 1965 | 48.3 | 30.2 | 10.9 | 10.6 | 51.7 |
| 1966 | 47.5 | 26.8 | 15.3 | 10.4 | 52.5 |
| 1967 | 50.0 | 27.0 | 13.3 | 9.7 | 50.0 |
| 1968 | 49.3 | 30.8 | 14.0 | 5.9 | 50.7 |
| 1969 | 50.5 | 35.9 | 9.8 | 3.8 | 49.4 |
| 1970 | 51.5 | 38.6 | 8.2 | 1.7 | 48.5 |
| 1971 | 50.0 | 41.4 | 6.7 | 1.9 | 50.0 |
| 1972 | 48.5 | 44.1 | 6.1 | 1.3 | 51.5 |
| 1973 | 54.9 | 41.7 | 2.9 | 0.5 | 45.1 |
| 1974 | 55.9 | 41.6 | 2.4 | 0.1 | 44.1 |
| 1975 | 60.7 | 38.1 | 1.2 | – | 39.3 |
| 1976 | 57.3 | 40.9 | 1.6 | 0.2 | 42.7 |
| 1977 | 54.6 | 44.1 | 1.3 | – | 45.4 |
| 1978 | 55.2 | 42.2 | 2.6 | – | 44.8 |
| 1979 | 54.3 | 44.2 | 1.5 | – | 45.7 |
| 1980 | 50.2 | 49.4 | 0.5 | – | 49.8 |

Notes:
(a) Tenders approved.
(b) Including maisonettes.

While some tower blocks have been demolished, many that occupy convenient city centre sites (such as The Sentinels in Birmingham, Trellick Tower and Great Arthur House on the Golden Lane Estate in London) remain extremely popular with residents and have even been subject to an element of gentrification, caused by the onward sale of leases purchased by original tenants under the right to buy scheme to more affluent purchasers.

In 1988, the Conservative government of Margaret Thatcher set up the first of six housing action trusts designed to regenerate some of Britain's most deprived council housing areas, which involved refurbishment or demolition of council properties in these areas, as well as improved community facilities and scope for new private and social housing developments. The North Hull HAT was set up to regenerate a large area of predominantly interwar council housing in the north of Hull, Humberside. Liverpool HAT covered 67 of the worst tower blocks on Merseyside; 54 of these blocks were demolished and replaced by new public or private sector housing developments, while the remaining 13 blocks were refurbished. Stonebridge HAT in Harlesden, London, was the final HAT to cease to exist when it was wound up in 2007, mostly covering an area of council housing built during the 1960s and 1970s. Waltham Forest HAT in South London covered several council estates, mostly built during the 1960s, and lasted until 2002, with the final phase of the regeneration being completed several years later by English Partnerships. Tower Hamlets HAT involved the regeneration of three council estates, mostly consisting of flats, in East London. Perhaps the most notable HAT was the one founded in 1993 to regenerate the Castle Vale estate in Birmingham, which had been built in the 1960s. The original master plan for the redevelopment of Castle Vale saw 17 out of 34 tower blocks on the estate earmarked for demolition, as well as 24 of the estate's 27 maisonette blocks, but by the time of the HAT's demise in 2005 all but two of the 34 tower blocks had been demolished, as well as all of the maisonette blocks and more than 100 bungalows. Community facilities on the estate were also improved, and the main shopping centre was completely redeveloped.

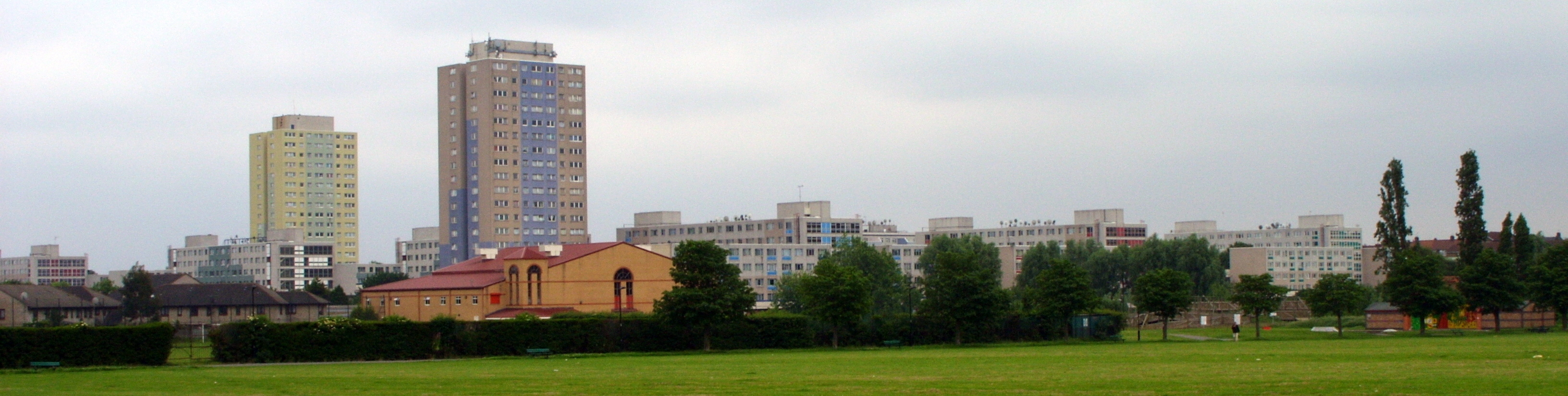
Broadwater Farm in Haringey, north London

One of the most ambitious post-war council housing developments, the complex of estates at Broadwater Farm (shown above), became a national symbol of perceived failures in the council housing system following the Broadwater Farm riot in 1985. Since then, Broadwater Farm has been the focus of an intense regeneration programme, resulting in a dramatic drop in crime on the estate.

In London, many council estates are being demolished and replaced with luxury housing, resulting in a net loss of social housing. Campaigners fear almost 8,000 homes could be lost during the decade following 2018. Among estates for regeneration, over 80 will be partly or completely demolished.

=== Financialization ===
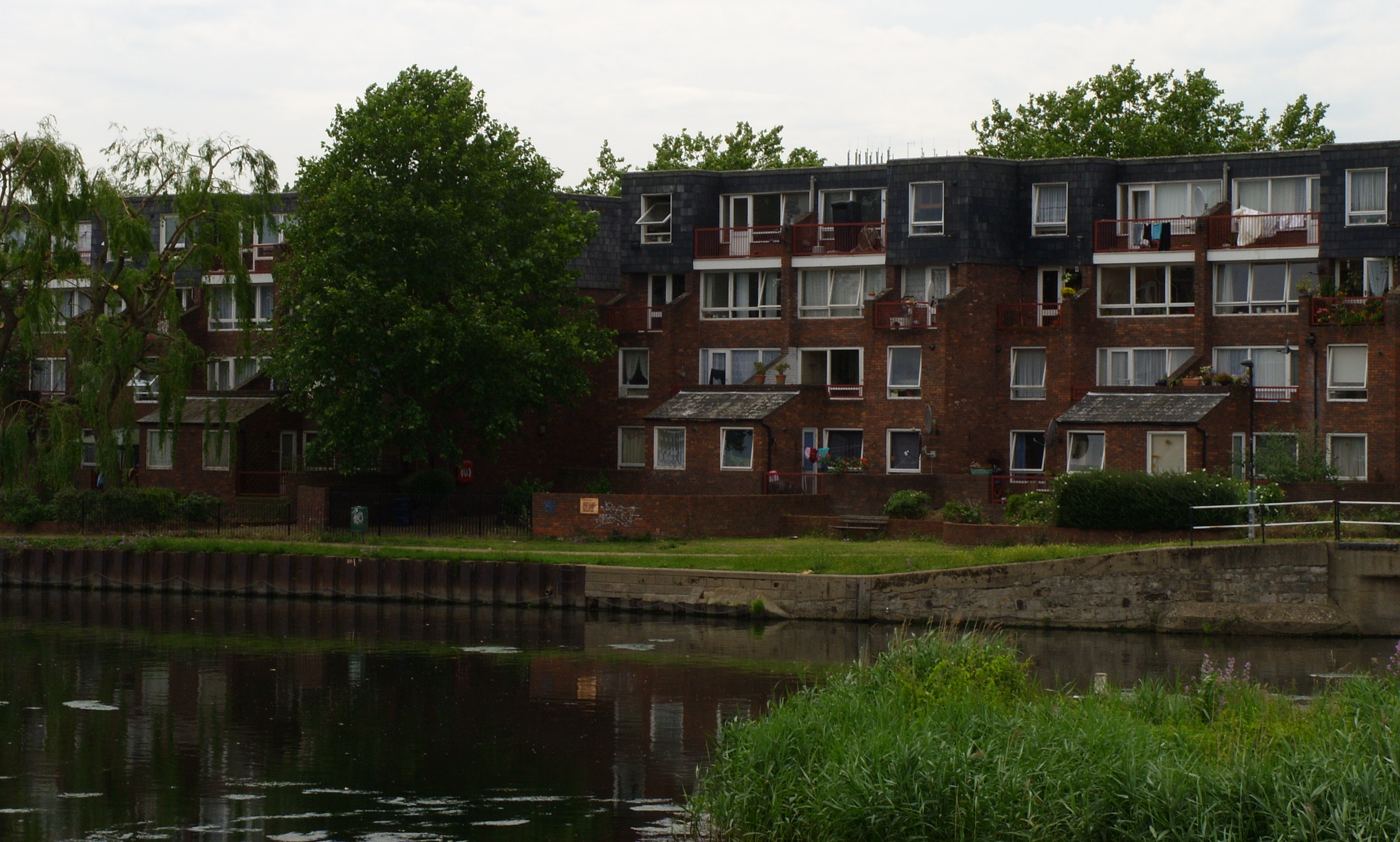
1970s council housing in Haringey, north London

In recent years, the financialization of housing in the UK has contributed to issues in the public housing sector. Under the wider neoliberal agenda, the deregulation of mortgage finance and the liberalisation of credit was implemented, creating systemic risks as 'sub-prime borrowers' bought homes with loans they could not realistically pay back. In the U.K, financialization became increasingly prominent after the 1990s as securitization and foreign finance were introduced in the housing sector. One of the key mechanisms of financialization was securitization, which allowed investors' mortgages to be sold as packages in the market, encouraging the imperative of profitability. Housing associations, which previously relied on government grants and private donations, could now access capital markets and sell bonds. However, this led to a shift in their focus from providing affordable homes to generating returns for investors. Financialization also led to an increase in buy-to-let mortgages, resulting in higher private tenancy levels and rising costs.

== Council housing estates ==
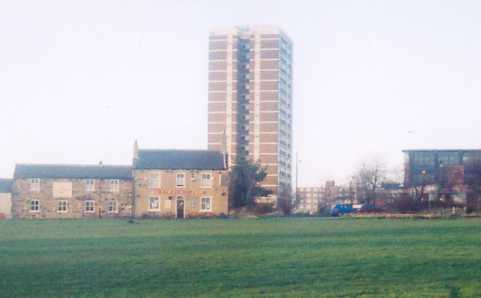
Seacroft, east Leeds

Governmental initiatives have heavily influenced the architectural design and character of council estates. After the Great War, there was a public call for 'homes fit for heroes' that led to the Addison Act where mixed-tenure estates were built with generously proportioned semi-detached houses designed, albeit only affordable by the most prosperous workers. In the 1930s, the intents changed with the push to eliminate inner city slums of the back-to-back housing. Aneurin Bevan's new towns and estates planned to the Tudor Walters standards were designed to be the pinnacle of housing to which all classes would aspire. This gradually changed through the 1950s and 1960s, partly due to the increase in private housebuilding under Harold Macmillan, as well as due to dropping standards, especially with the adoption of system-building by many local authorities across the UK in the 1960s. Nonetheless, space standards in council homes (based on those prescribed by the Parker-Morris Report) remained above those of many privately built dwellings at the time.

The earliest council estates were built within the borough boundaries on low value land that was walking distance from the places of employment. When that was exhausted, peripheral estates were built on the edge of the town. Residents needed to commute by public transport or bicycle, as almost none of the people living in these areas had cars until well after World War II. Even before 1939, it was recognised that the favoured 'garden suburb' model of development, with low density housing on the edges of cities produced problems of social alienation, lack of amenities and often higher shopping and transport costs.

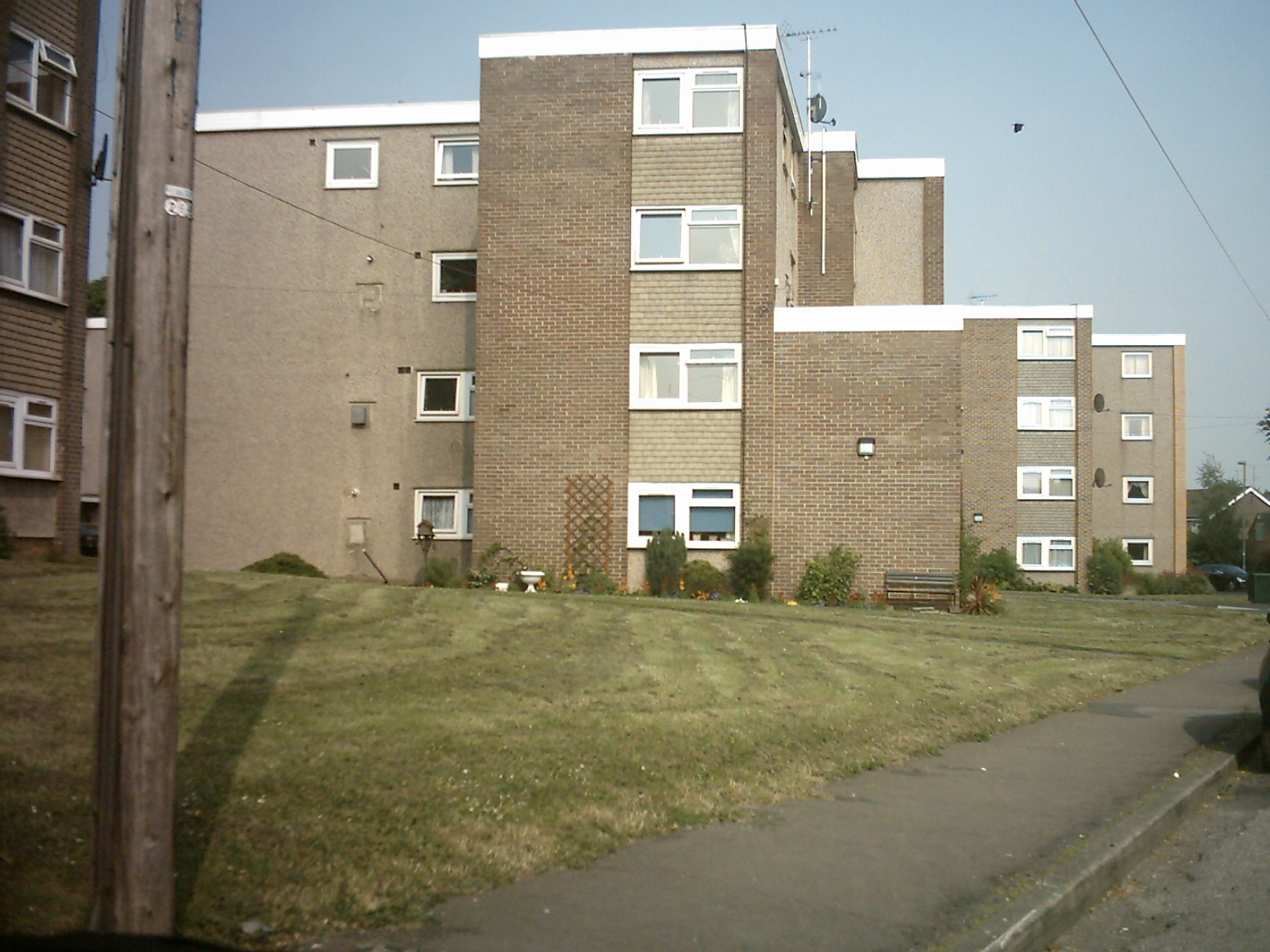
York Place Flats, a medium rise development of council flats in Wetherby, West Yorkshire

Councils bought vacant land in neighbouring boroughs to build overspill estates. In Greater Manchester, this included Wythenshawe in 1930 and then Hattersley in the 1960s. Later, infill estates were created on small pieces of brown field land that had been vacated by contracting heavy industry.

Some pit villages, such as Grimethorpe in Yorkshire, are almost entirely composed of original council housing. Leeds has Seacroft – the 'town within the city'. Sheffield boasts the award-winning Park Hill. Both Seacroft and Park Hill are now undergoing major redevelopment. In Tyneside, large council estates include Byker and Walker in Newcastle, Felling in Gateshead and Meadow Well in North Tyneside, the site of violent civil disorder in 1991. Meadow Well has been largely redeveloped since this unrest, with most of the old housing having been demolished.

=== Estate design ===
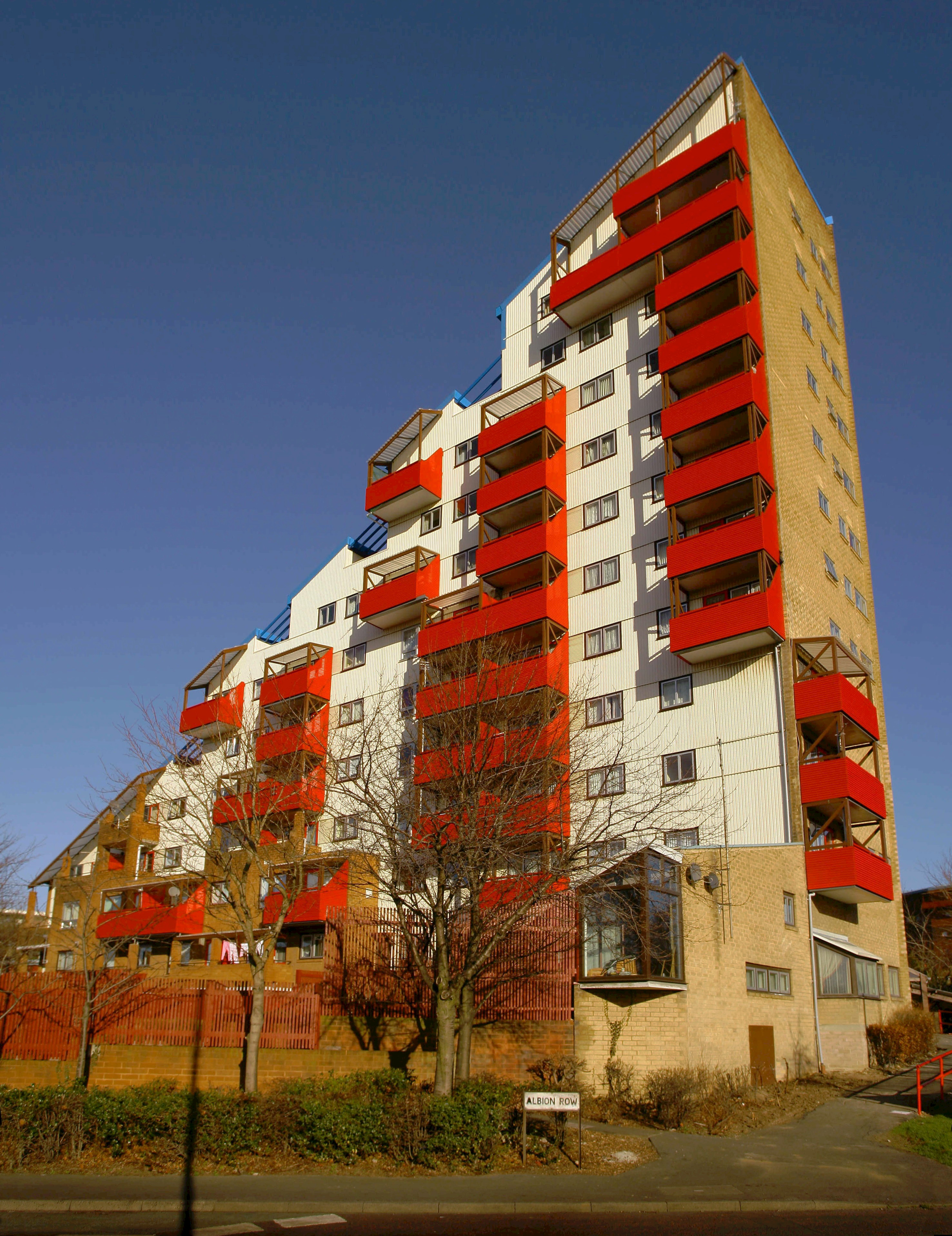
Tom Collins House, Byker Wall Estate, Newcastle Upon Tyne

The very earliest council estates were in London, as they were permitted to finance houses ten years before non-metropolitan areas and these were 'block estates' that is estates of tenement blocks, or in modern terminology estates of low or medium rise flats. The first was the Boundary Estate. The alternative was the 'cottage estate' trialled at Totterdown Fields, which emulated garden city principles, though this was hampered until the Hampstead Garden Suburb Act 1906 and the Housing, Town Planning, &c. Act 1909, removed some of the restrictions imposed by the 1875s byelaws. The Progress Estate, Well Hall Road, had an open spaced layout that gave a pleasant environment to residents.

The Tudor Walters Report was adopted and council estates opened up. They were designed to Radburn principles with wide feeder roads joining short cul-de-sacs. Houses were separated by at least 70 feet (21 m) from the facing houses. The former gridiron street pattern was deprecated.

The Housing, Town Planning, &c. Act 1919 (also known as the Addison Act after Minister of Health, Dr Christopher Addison, the-then Minister for Housing), and the resulting wave of mass council housing in the early 1920s was among the first generation of houses in the country to feature electricity, running water, bathrooms, indoor toilets and front/rear gardens. However, some council houses were still being built with outdoor toilets, attached to the house, until well into the 1930s. Some of the earliest council houses did not feature an actual bathroom; the bath could often be found in the kitchen with a design that allowed it to double as a work surface. These new houses had two, three, four or five bedrooms, and generously sized back gardens intended for vegetable growing. At the best they were built at a density of houses of 12 per acre (30/ha). However, later in the 20th century these houses were modernised to feature modern bathrooms and indoor toilets.

The Housing (Financial Provisions) Act 1924 (Wheatley Act), reduced the expected standard in a council built house. Under the Addison Act a house would be 1,000 square feet (93 m^{2}) but after 1924 it would be 620 square feet (58 m^{2}). Flats and bungalows were first built by local councils during the interwar years, but in relatively low volumes. Most interwar council houses were built on completely new estates.

The Housing Act 1930 encouraged further mass slum clearance. There was a cut in funding and the housing density on the peripheral estates was increased; leading to a poorer build quality. The former tenants of the inner city properties, were displaced far from their workplaces unable to afford the higher rents (though reduced from the 1919 levels) or the cost of transport. Although the standard of housing improved, stable communities were broken up, and with it, support networks.

=== System build estates ===
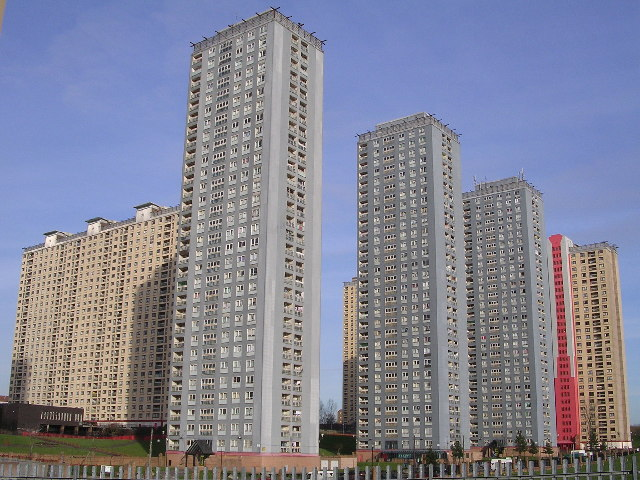
Glasgow's Red Road flats

It was not until the 1950s that mixed estates of multi-storey flats and houses became a common sight. Until then it was rare to see blocks of flats that were more than three or four storeys high. An early and famous development of council flats was at Quarry Hill in Leeds. Modelled on Karl-Marx-Hof flats in Vienna, the complex was built by Leeds City Council. At the time they were considered revolutionary: each flat had a motorised rubbish chute leading to a central incinerator. The complex had its own offices, shops and gasworks. The 1970s sitcom Queenie's Castle was filmed there. Long-term problems with the steel-frame structure led to demolition, beginning in 1978 and there is now no evidence of their existence. Though not in UK, the Oliver Bond flats in Dublin, Ireland were built in 1936 and have a similar design to many of the council estates in the UK today. The Red Road flats in Glasgow were once the tallest residential buildings in Europe.

By the 1990s, many multi-storey flats and low-rise flats and maisonettes (mostly built in the 1950s and 1960s) were being demolished, due to their deteriorating condition, structural problems and a difficulty in finding new tenants when these properties became empty.

One notable regeneration programme featuring tower blocks was that of the Castle Vale estate in Birmingham, built between 1964 and 1969 to rehouse families from inner city 'slums' in areas including Aston and Nechells. 32 of the estate's 34 tower blocks were cleared between 1995 and 2004, with the remaining two being refurbished and re-opened as "vertical warden-controlled schemes". All of the estate's 27 maisonette blocks were also cleared, as were more than 100 bungalows. The remaining low-rise stock, however, was retained. The two remaining tower blocks were comprehensively refurbished. The sites of the demolished flats have been replaced by both private and social housing in low-rise redevelopments.

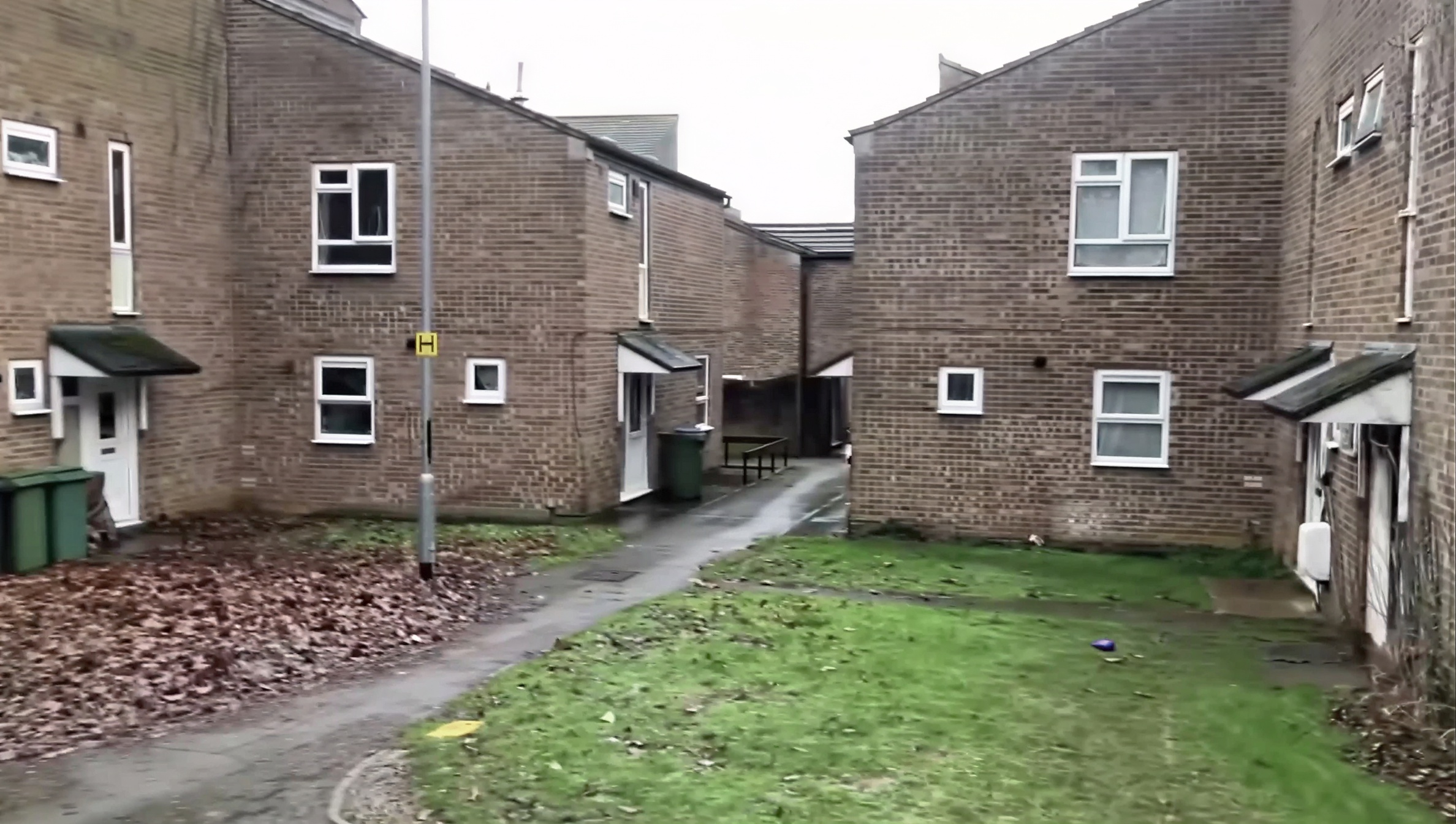
Low-rise dwellings in Hemmingwell, Wellingborough

The mood had changed and new council garden estates were built. These consist of low rise dwellings, mainly houses with gardens. The high residential density, equivalent to a tower block, is achieved by pedestrianisation of the estate, which allowed the dwellings to be very close together, separated by pathways not 11-metre (36 ft) -wide roads. The resident's car park is next to the service road. Front doors open onto pedestrian areas, which thus provide safe play areas for children. An early late 1960s example of this design is Cressingham Gardens. This estate has been popular with its residents, and they have resisted all attempts to be resettled.

=== Largest estates ===
Becontree in Dagenham is the largest area of council housing in the UK with a population of over 100,000. It forms the bulk of a town. It was built during the 1920s and early 1930s. Otherwise, the largest estates are Wythenshawe in the south of Manchester and Bransholme in the north-east of Hull.

In Scotland, Glasgow has the highest proportion of social housing. The largest estates include Drumchapel, Easterhouse, Castlemilk and Pollok. In Edinburgh there are several smaller peripheral estates such as Craigmillar, Wester Hailes and Sighthill. The large council estates in Wales include Caia Park in Wrexham, Bettws in Newport and Ely in Cardiff.

== Demographics ==
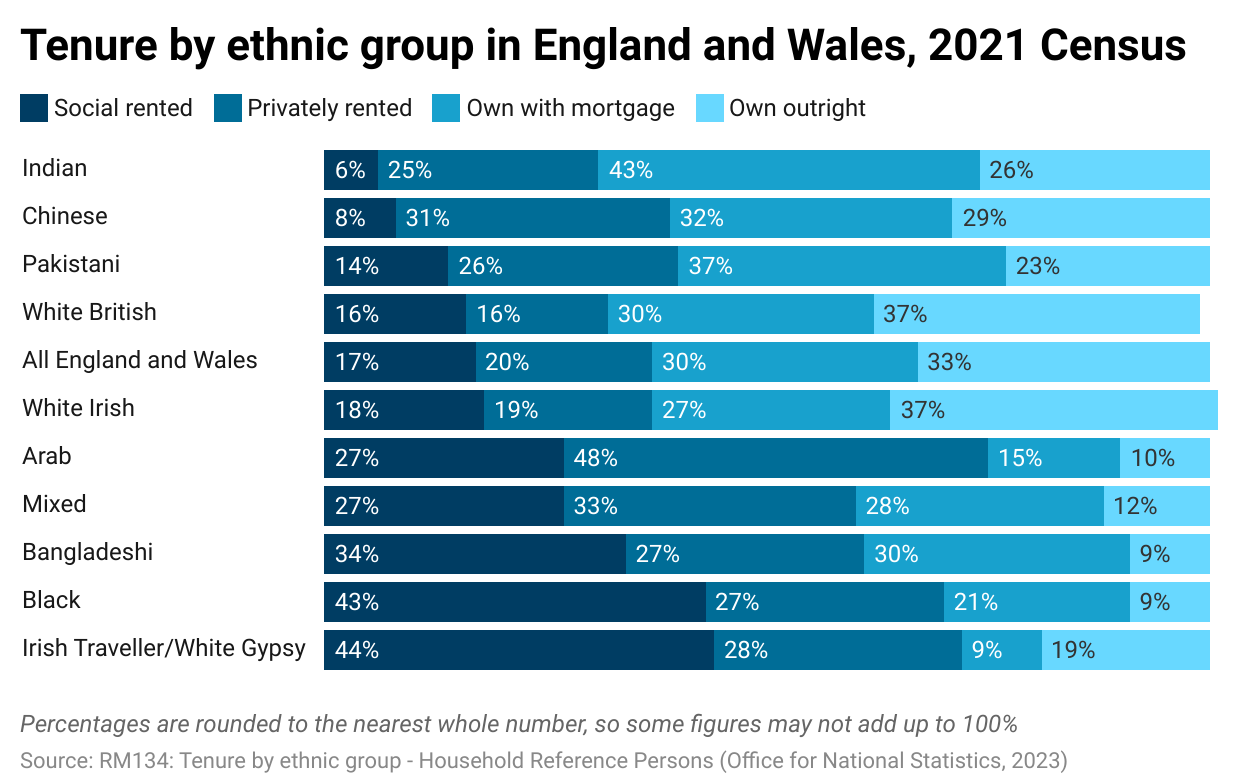
Tenure by ethnic group in England and Wales, 2021 census

The 2021 United Kingdom census for England and Wales recorded 4.2 million people, or 17.1% of the population, residing in either a housing association or local council housing. This was a slight increase from the 4.1 million figure (17.6%) recorded in the 2011 census. 23.1% of the population in Greater London reside in social housing – the highest proportion out of all regions in England.

=== Ethnicity ===
Occupation of social housing varied significantly between different ethnic groups, with the Black population near three times as likely to live in social housing as the White British population. The breakdown by ethnic groups according to the census was:

Tenure by ethnicity in England and Wales
| Ethnic group | Social rented | Privately rented | Own with mortgage | Own outright |
|---|---|---|---|---|
| Indian | 6% | 25% | 43% | 26% |
| Chinese | 8% | 31% | 32% | 29% |
| Pakistani | 14% | 26% | 37% | 23% |
| White British | 16% | 16% | 30% | 37% |
| All England and Wales | 17% | 20% | 30% | 33% |
| White Irish | 18% | 19% | 27% | 37% |
| Arab | 27% | 48% | 15% | 10% |
| Mixed | 27% | 33% | 28% | 12% |
| Bangladeshi | 34% | 27% | 30% | 9% |
| Black | 43% | 27% | 21% | 9% |
| Irish Traveller/White Gypsy | 44% | 28% | 9% | 19% |

=== Religion ===
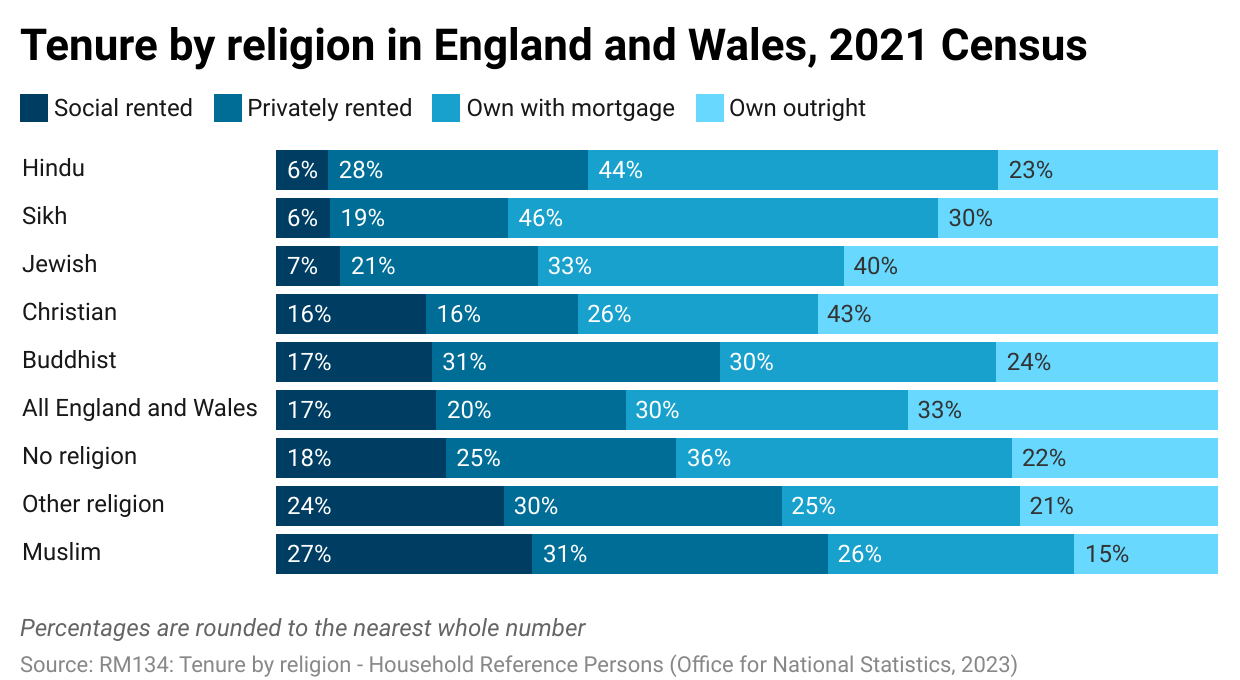
Tenure by religion in England and Wales, 2021 census

Similar disparity exists between different religious groups, with people who identified as Muslim having the highest percentage living in social housing - 10 percentage higher than the overall population. The breakdown by religious groups according to the census was:

Tenure by religion in England and Wales
| Religious group | Social rented | Privately rented | Own with mortgage | Own outright |
|---|---|---|---|---|
| Hindu | 6% | 28% | 44% | 23% |
| Sikh | 6% | 19% | 46% | 30% |
| Jewish | 7% | 21% | 33% | 40% |
| Christian | 16% | 16% | 26% | 43% |
| Buddhist | 17% | 31% | 30% | 24% |
| All England and Wales | 17% | 20% | 30% | 33% |
| No religion | 18% | 25% | 36% | 22% |
| Other religion | 24% | 29% | 25% | 21% |
| Muslim | 27% | 31% | 26% | 15% |

== Domestic violence ==
The Housing Act 1996 imposes a duty on local housing authorities in England to rehouse victims of domestic violence. The authority simply needs a 'reason to believe' that the person is homeless for them to be eligible for assistance, and that they are in priority need of accommodation. Failure in this duty has led to cases of victims returning to their abuser.

== Law ==
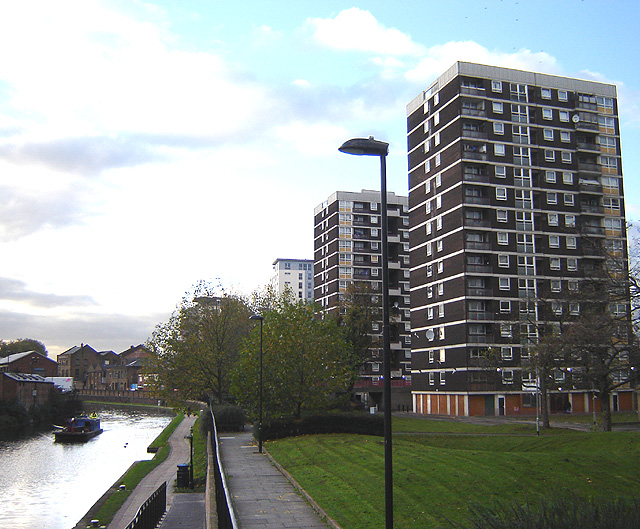
De Beauvoir Estate, De Beauvoir Town, east London

The legal status and management of council houses, and the social housing sector, has been subject to lobbying and change in recent years. Local authorities now have new legal powers to enable them to deal with anti-social behaviour and the misuse of council houses by organised gangs or anti-social tenants. An example is when a gang uses social housing as a "crack house". Anti-social behaviour orders (ASBOs) were created by the Crime and Disorder Act 1998, and ASBIs were created by amendments to the Housing Act 1996, enacted by the Anti-social Behaviour Act 2003. Tony Blair launched the Respect Agenda in 2005, aimed at instilling core values in the tenants of council houses. Recently bodies such as the Social Housing Law Association have been formed to discuss the impact of legislation in the social housing sector and to provide training and lobbying facilities for those who work in that area.

== Historical statistics on housing construction ==
Dwellings completed by local authorities, New Towns, and Scottish Housing Association, 1945–80 (thousands)

| Year | England and Wales | Scotland and Northern Ireland |
|---|---|---|
| 1945–50 (annual average) | 96.3 | 14.3 |
| 1951–55 (annual average) | 188.1 | 30.9 |
| 1956–60 (annual average) | 124.4 | 25.9 |
| 1961 | 98.5 | 20.1 |
| 1962 | 111.7 | 19.0 |
| 1963 | 102.4 | 21.6 |
| 1964 | 126.1 | 29.5 |
| 1965 | 140.9 | 27.6 |
| 1966 | 142.4 | 28.2 |
| 1967 | 159.3 | 34.0 |
| 1968 | 148.0 | 33.3 |
| 1969 | 139.9 | 34.3 |
| 1970 | 134.9 | 34.4 |
| 1971 | 117.2 | 28.6 |
| 1972 | 93.6 | 19.6 |
| 1973 | 79.3 | 17.3 |
| 1974 | 99.4 | 16.2 |
| 1975 | 122.9 | 22.8 |
| 1976 | 124.2 | 21.2 |
| 1977 | 121.2 | 14.3 |
| 1978 | 96.8 | 9.9 |
| 1979 | 75.0 | 7.9 |
| 1980 | 77.1 | 7.0 |

Proportion of houses and flats built by local authorities and New Towns in Scotland and Scottish Special Housing Association, 1960–80 (a)

| Year | Houses (%) | Flats (b) 2–4-storey (%) | Flats 5-storey and over | Maisonettes | Total flats |
|---|---|---|---|---|---|
| 1960 | 46.7 | 34.4 | 12.1 | 6.8 | 53.3 |
| 1961 | 52.5 | 31.4 | 7.3 | 8.9 | 47.5 |
| 1962 | 38.2 | 30.8 | 13.2 | 17.7 | 61.8 |
| 1963 | 40.9 | 25.0 | 22.2 | 11.9 | 59.1 |
| 1964 | 38.6 | 26.5 | 24.6 | 10.4 | 61.4 |
| 1965 | 35.2 | 21.0 | 28.7 | 15.1 | 64.8 |
| 1966 | 41.9 | 25.1 | 25.1 | 7.9 | 58.1 |
| 1967 | 46.6 | 24.8 | 28.6 | | 53.4 |
| 1968 | 59.1 | 28.2 | 12.7 | | 40.9 |
| 1969 | 57.2 | 25.6 | 17.2 | | 42.8 |
| 1970 | 52.8 | 25.4 | 21.8 | | 47.2 |
| 1971 | 61.9 | 23.3 | 14.8 | | 38.1 |
| 1972 | 67.2 | 24.9 | 7.9 | | 32.8 |
| 1973 | 81.9 | 13.4 | 4.7 | | 18.1 |
| 1974 | 86.6 | 11.7 | 1.7 | | 13.4 |
| 1975 | 77.0 | 17.6 | 5.4 | | 23.0 |
| 1976 | 84.1 | 13.7 | 2.2 | | 15.9 |
| 1977 | 79.0 | 20.7 | 0.3 | | 21.0 |
| 1978 | 82.2 | 16.5 | 1.3 | | 17.8 |
| 1979 | 75.6 | 24.4 | | | 24.4 |
| 1980 | 77.7 | 22.3 | | | 22.3 |

Notes:
(a) Tenders approved.
(b) Including maisonettes, which are not shown separately from 1967.

=== Analysis of housing built by year and government ===
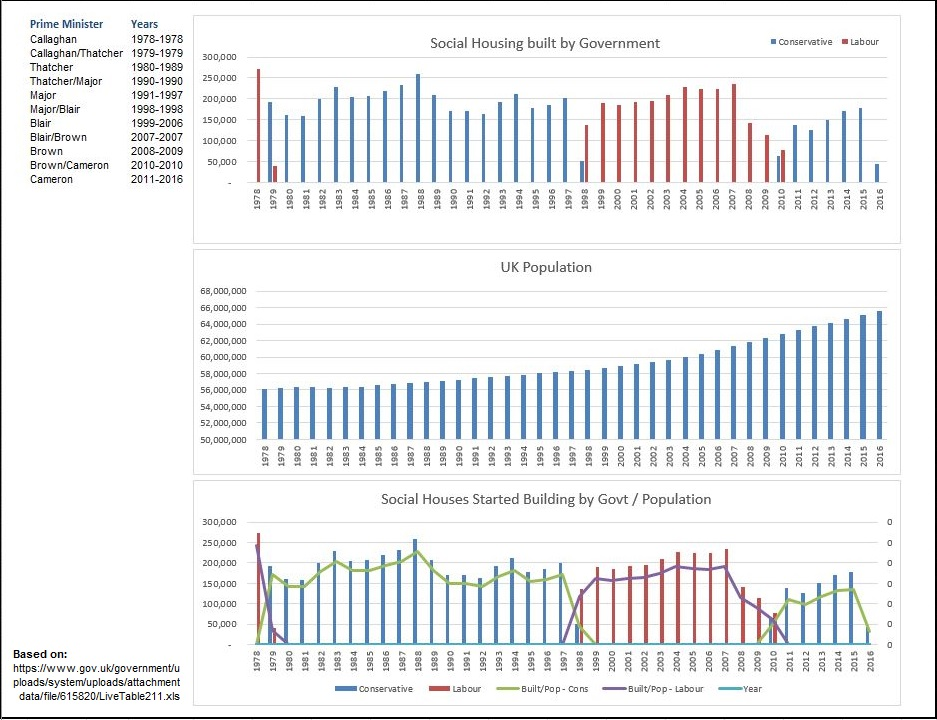
Analysis of UK house building by government and Prime Minister 1978–2016 (partial data)

Different British governments oversaw the vision, regulations and overall budget for social housing. Between 1978 and 2016, the amount of social housing started to be built failed to keep up with population growth from 2008 onwards.

In 2011, almost 40,000 English socially rented homes were built, but by 2017, just 5,900 social housing homes were completed, which is the smallest proportion of overall house building since records began. In 2018, government funding for social housing is widely considered insufficient, with it promising in response to build just 2,500 social homes per year. Most newly built homes will be too expensive for the poorest people. In 2019 in England official figures demonstrated that only 37,825 new homes were built for letting at discounted rents though the national housing waiting list is over 1.1 million households. London and some other local authorities in the home counties are moving people out, away from their work and their social networks due to the lack of available social housing and limited room for expansion.

== The public housing debate ==
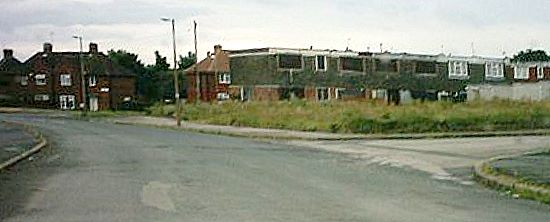
PRC housing in Seacroft, Leeds awaiting demolition and replacement

The public debate around housing can be understood as the debate between housing as a commodity versus as a right. In the immediate aftermath of both World War I and more particularly World War II, reconstruction was required to improve the housing stock destroyed in the violence and consequently, the attitude towards housing sector in those periods was more rights-based. There was a widespread public clamour for 'homes fit for heroes'. As a result, the initial years of the public housing sector witnessed an engaged role of the state, with legislation establishing an inclusive, affordable housing sector for the majority working classes. However, as a consequence of the post-war era of investment that encouraged home-ownership, housing increasingly became commodified. A housing sector that treats housing as a commodity implies that it is subject to market forces and can be bought and sold in accordance with demand and supply.

This debate on the provision is politically polarised, as can be seen in the large number of acts of Parliament referred to in previous sections. The political left viewed council estates as a great achievement, while the political right have worked to curb their spread. In 1945, the newly elected Labour government established a raft of social reforms in the issues of health, education, welfare, and housing with a massive drive to build a large swathes of diverse housing available to all with these owned and controlled by local authorities. In 1951, the new Conservative government changed the reason for their existence to being basic housing only for the most needy from being affordable homes for all. This change of focus resulted in the breaking up the social mix by grouping dysfunctional families together.

The movement from a close urban society with multiple emotional and practical support mechanisms to new out-of-town estates with few informal facilities has been recognised since the 1930s. Again, when residence is restricted to the poor and dysfunctional, the effect is greater. Council estates have been blamed for creating isolated communities and fostering there a mentality where residents have low aspirations.

Thereafter, council estates were often stereotyped as 'problem places', where social difficulties like crime and welfare dependency are expected. Estates with particularly marked economic and social deprivation are derogated as sink estates. Council house residents have been stereotyped as an underclass, whereas in reality, these residents are ethnically and culturally diverse. Suggestions for crime prevention include:

With reference to housing layouts, the regeneration of large housing estates should incorporate measures such as diversification of tenure, the creation of smaller community areas, the provision of facilities for the young and proposals to create a more attractive environment, since it has been shown that packages of such measures are successful in reducing crime.

Social policy economists, such as Culyer and Barr, have been critical of the role that council housing plays in attempts to help the poor. One large criticism is that it hurts labour mobility with its system of allocating housing to those in the local area. Working-class people thus face a disincentive for moving across district lines, where they would be further down the waiting list for council housing in the new districts.

Problems have been seen in those who regard stable homes as a family's right see public housing differently from those who see it as welfare. They are comfortable that council housing was generally typified by unimaginatively designed houses with generously sized rooms. (Note: Council housing was generally typified by unimaginatively designed houses with generously sized rooms when compared to houses at the bottom end of the private sector, particularly those built in the 1970s after the Parker Morris standards were introduced.) The estates typically had restrictions that prevented tenants personalising their houses, down to specifying the colour of the frontdoors, and the immediate area outside.

The system favours those who have already secured tenancy, even when they are no longer in dire need. The combination of security of tenure and subsidised rent gives little incentive to tenants to downsize from family accommodation after their children have moved out. Meanwhile, those who are on the waiting list are often in much greater need of this welfare, yet they cannot have it; once a council house has been granted to a tenant, they cannot be evicted except for deliberate non-payment of rent, recurrent anti-social behaviour, or if serious criminal offences are committed at the premises. Recent policy decisions to reduce the supply of public housing have exacerbated this problem. In the early 2010s, the government sought to redress this shortage and encourage movement of tenants by imposing a bedroom tax, where tenants deemed to have more bedrooms than the household need were denied full welfare benefits to cover the cost.

The truth is that council housing is a living tomb. You dare not give the house up because you might never get another, but staying is to be trapped in a ghetto of both place and mind. … The people in them need to have better training and more incentives to work. And council estates need to be less cut off from the rest of the economy and society. (Will Hutton, 2007)

== See also ==
- Dispossession: The Great Social Housing Swindle – documentary film discussing social policy towards public housing in the UK
- List of large council estates in the UK
- List of existing model dwellings
- Housing in the United Kingdom
- Public housing

== Bibliography ==
- Allen, Chris (2009). "Anti-Social Housing: 'Right to Buy' and Thatcher's Legacy". Walls come tumbling down. The Institute of Applied Social Sciences University of Birmingham.
- Burnett, John (1986). A social history of housing : 1815–1985 (2nd e. ed.). New York: Methuen. ISBN 0416367801.
- Calow, Dennis (2007). Home Sweet Home: A century of Leicester housing 1814–1914. Leicester: University of Leicester:Special collections online.
- Gimson, Andrew (17 October 2013). "How Macmillan built 300,000 houses a year". Conservative Home.
- Hanley, Lynsey (2012). Estates : an intimate history (New ed.). Granta: Granta. ISBN 9781847087027.
- Hollow, Matthew (2011). "Suburban Ideals on England's Interwar Council Estates".
- Meek, James (2014). "Where shall we live". London Review of Books. 36 (1): 7–16.
- Panagidis; Savva (2015). "Entry #411:Southwyck Open House". Designing the Urban Common. Theatrum Mundi.
- Parkinson-Bailey, John J. (2000). Manchester: an Architectural History. Manchester: Manchester University Press. ISBN 0-7190-5606-3.
- "Council Housing". Living Heritage-Improving towns. UK Parliament.
- "New Towns". Living Heritage-Improving towns. UK Parliament.
- de Pennington, Joanne (2011). "Beneath the Surface: A Country of Two Nations". BBC History.
- "Case Studies – Progress Estate". Ideal Homes.
- Rubinstein, Antonia; Andrews, Andy; Schweitzer, Pam (1991). Just like the country (PDF). Vol. 1. Age Exchange – via Reminiscence Theatre Archive.
- ——; ——; —— (1991). Just like the country part 2 (PDF). Vol. 2. Age Exchange – via Reminiscence Theatre Archive.
- Walker Morris: Press Release (2005). "Wakefield housing initiative England's largest". Walker Morris. Archived from the original on 11 December 2015.
- "History of Council Housing". University of the West of England. 2008.
- Yelling, J.A. (1995). "Banishing London's slums: The interwar cottage estates" (PDF). Transactions. 46. London and Middlesex Archeological Society: 167–173.
