= Fawcett Properties Ltd v Buckingham CC =

Fawcett Properties Ltd v Buckinghamshire CC
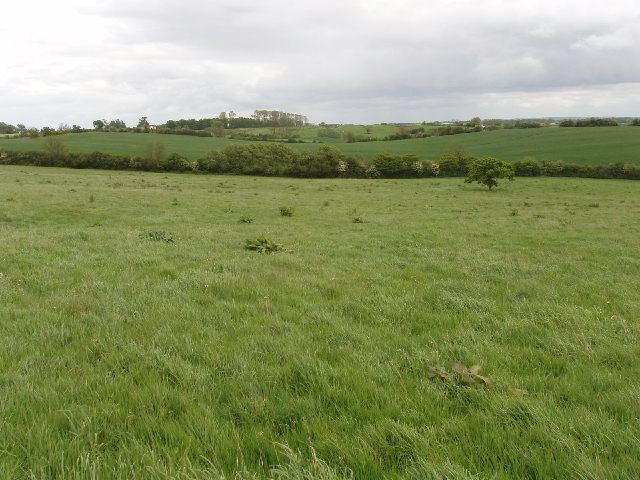
- Court: House of Lords
- Full case name: Fawcett Properties Ltd v Buckinghamshire County Council
- Decided: 26 Oct 1960
- Citations: [1960] 3 WLR 831 [1960] 3 All ER 503; 59 LGR 69; HL(E) [1961] AC 636

Case history
- Prior actions: Chancery Division of High Court before Mr Justice Roxburgh; Court of Appeal

Keywords
- Planning, certainty

Fawcett Properties Ltd v Buckingham County Council [1960] has become a leading case in planning law and concerned agricultural conditions of use. It is also relevant for its tests on finding certainty versus uncertainty of policy, contract or other concepts rendering them void. It has been applied in English trusts law which has long held a cy-près doctrine, expressed in pre 1649-Law French meaning "there nearly" that is perfecting concepts or a purpose for funds which is tantamount to a legitimate interest or concern and intended to take clear effect.

== Legal context ==
The law of planning permissions, integral to urban planning, sits at the crossroads of land law and public law. Specifically it combines the laws enabling and interpreting development and commercial interests with public interest laws such as in social welfare, food resource sustainability, quality/aesthetic consistency of housing and pollution mitigation. The case stressed the legitimate goal of protection of the Metropolitan Green Belt in primary legislation and similar restrictions crop up in rural zoned land use areas outside of Local Plan development zones, in UK planning practical policy. The case upheld the ability of local planning authorities (LPAs) to impose restrictions which will only allow development in sensitive parts of their areas where meeting a pressing agricultural need to house the family of an agricultural/forestry worker, provided it has balanced such policies against those enabling developments to, if fully developed, meet the local housing needs assessment. The cases recognises that greenfield sites are cheaper to develop and have more aesthetic qualities than many brownfield (urban) sites however many LPAs will choose to make any development on such land a narrow exception not a norm.

== Facts ==
Buckingham County Council gave permission for cottages to be built in an urban green belt, on the condition that ‘occupation of the houses shall be limited to persons whose employment.... is... in agriculture... or in forestry or in an industry mainly dependent upon agriculture’, as defined by the Town and Country Planning Act 1947 section 119. Fawcett Properties Ltd argued this condition was void.

== Judgment ==
The House of Lords held that the condition was valid because it followed the policy of keeping the green belt for agricultural population, similarly defined in the Housing Act 1936 section 115. The definition could not, without overwhelming evidence, be held void for uncertainty.

In the course of his judgment, Lord Denning reasoned:

Lastly, when he came to his reply on uncertainty, Mr. Megarry mentioned the contract cases such as In re Vince [1892] 2 Q.B. 478; 8 T.L.R. 334; 67 L.T. 70, C.A. But here again he got nowhere: because in cases of contract, as of wills, the courts do not hold the terms void for uncertainty unless it is utterly impossible to put a meaning upon them. The duty of the court is to put a fair meaning on the terms used, and not, as was said in one case, to repose on the easy pillow of saying that the whole is void for uncertainty: see Doe d. Winter v Perratt (1843) 6 M&G 314, 361, HL by Lord Brougham, In re Roberts (1881) 19 Ch.D. 520, 529, C.A. by Jessel M.R. Reverting now to the examples given by Mr. Megarry, all of these were, it seemed to me, examples of ambiguity or absurdity and not of uncertainty, or at any rate, not of such uncertainty as makes a condition void. For I am of opinion that a planning condition is only void for uncertainty if it can be given no meaning or no sensible or ascertainable meaning, and not merely because it is ambiguous or leads to absurd results. It is the daily task of the courts to resolve ambiguities of language and to choose between them; and to construe words so as to avoid absurdities or to put up with them. and this applies to conditions in planning permissions as well as to other documents. If you should take any of Mr. Megarry's examples the courts, I am sure, could say whether the case came within the condition or not. They would not have to give up the task in despair.

== Applied in ==
- Trump International Golf Club Scotland Ltd v The Scottish Ministers [2015] UKSC 74, Supreme Court (Scotland) (SC S)
- Percy v Hall [1997] QB 924, CA
- Newbury District Council v Secretary of State for the Environment (1977) 75 LGR 608, DC (Divisional Court)
- City of London Corporation v Secretary of State for the Environment (1971) 71 LGR 28
- East Suffolk County Council v Secretary of State for the Environment (1972) 70 LGR 595, DC
- Hall & Co Ltd v Shoreham-by-Sea Urban District Council [1964] 1 WLR 240 and (1963) 61 LGR 508, CA including Obiter dictum/Opinion of Lord Denning

== Considered in ==
- Newbury District Council v Secretary of State for the Environment [1978] 1 WLR 1241, CA
- Kingsway Investments (Kent) Ltd v Kent County Council [1969] 2 QB 332, CA
- Mixnams Properties Ltd v Chertsey Urban District Council [1964] 1 QB 214, CA
- Wilson v West Sussex County Council [1963] 2 QB 764, CA

== See also ==
- English trust law
- Pyx Granite Co Ltd v Ministry of Housing and Local Government [1960] AC 260, per Lord Denning
- In re Roberts, Sir George Jessel MR
