= Housing (Financial Provisions) Act 1924 =

Act of the Parliament of the United Kingdom

Housing (Financial Provisions) Act 1924 (Note: Section 17(1).)
- Act of Parliament
- Parliament of the United Kingdom
- Long title: An act to amend the financial provisions of the Housing &c. act, 1923 and for other purposes incidental thereto or connected therewith.
- Citation: 14 & 15 Geo. 5. c. 35
- Territorial extent: England and Wales; Scotland; (Note: Section 17(4).)

Dates
- Royal assent: 7 August 1924
- Commencement: 7 August 1924 (Note: The Acts of Parliament (Commencement) Act 1793.)
- Repealed: 21 May 1981
Other legislation
Amends	Housing, &c. Act 1923
Amended by	Housing Act 1925; Housing (Scotland) Act 1925; Housing Act 1930; Housing (Scotland) Act 1930; Housing (Rural Authorities) Act 1931; Housing Act 1935; Housing Act 1936; Housing (Scotland) Act 1950; Rent Act 1957; Housing Act 1957; Housing (Financial Provisions) Act 1958
Repealed by	Statute Law (Repeals) Act 1981

Status: Repealed

Text of statute as originally enacted

The Housing (Financial Provisions) Act 1924 (14 & 15 Geo. 5. c. 35) was an act of the Parliament of the United Kingdom.

The act built upon the previous Housing, Town Planning, &c. Act 1919, by increasing government subsidies to be paid to local authorities to build municipal housing for rent for low paid workers from £6 to £9. It also extended the time over which the subsidy was paid from 20 to 40 years.

The act was introduced by the first Labour government, and was known as the Wheatley Housing Act after John Wheatley, the minister who introduced it.

The Prime Minister Ramsay MacDonald dubbed the act 'our most important legislative item'. This measure went some way towards rectifying the problem of the housing shortage, caused by the disruption of the building trade during the First World War and the inability of working-class tenants to rent decent, affordable housing. Wheatley was able to provide public housing to council tenants, as against the previous government's commitment to privatisation. This landmark act subsidised the construction of 521,700 rented homes at controlled rents by 1933, when the subsidy for encouraging local authority housing construction was abolished.

According to one historical study, Wheatley’s houses had “slightly larger dimensions than Chamberlain’s,” (Note: The Conservative Neville Chamberlain who, as Minister of Health 1924-29 and Chancellor of the Exchequer 1931-37, was responsible for much housebuilding in the interwar period) and were also the first to be “equipped compulsorily with a bathroom instead of a bath” in the scullery.

== Subsequent developments ==
The whole act was repealed by section 1(1) of, and part VI of schedule 1 to, the Statute Law (Repeals) Act 1981, which came into force on 21 May 1981.

== Bibliography ==
- Modern Britain: Life and Work through Two Centuries of Change by T.K. Derry and T.L. Jarman
