= Housing (Financial Provisions) Act 1933 =

Act of the Parliament of the United Kingdom

Housing (Financial Provisions) Act 1933 (Note: Section 3(1).)
- Act of Parliament
- Parliament of the United Kingdom
- Long title: An Act to bring to an end the power of the Minister of Health to grant subsidies under sections one and three of the Housing, &c. Act, 1923, and the Housing (Financial Provisions) Act, 1924, and to enable him to undertake to make contributions in certain cases towards losses sustained by authorities under guarantees given by them for facilitating the provision of houses to be let to the working classes.
- Citation: 23 & 24 Geo. 5. c. 15
- Territorial extent: England and Wales (Note: Section 3(2).)

Dates
- Royal assent: 18 May 1933
- Commencement: 18 May 1933 (Note: The Acts of Parliament (Commencement) Act 1793.)
- Repealed: 23 May 1950
Other legislation
Repealed by	Housing Act 1936; Statute Law Revision Act 1950
Relates to	Housing (Financial Provisions) (Scotland) Act 1933

Status: Repealed

Text of statute as originally enacted

The Housing (Financial Provisions) Act 1933 (23 & 24 Geo. 5. c. 15) was an act of the Parliament of the United Kingdom. The act extended to England and Wales; a similar Housing (Financial Provisions) (Scotland) Act 1933 (23 & 24 Geo. 5. c. 16) covered Scotland.

The act ended subsidies to local authorities for building housing, except for slum clearance which was supported by the Housing Act 1930 (20 & 21 Geo. 5. c. 39) (Greenwood Act).

== Subsequent developments ==
The whole act, so far as unrepealed, was repealed by section 1(1) of, and the first schedule to, the Statute Law Revision Act 1950 (14 Geo. 6. c. 6), which came into force on 23 May 1950.

== Bibliography ==
- "Housing Subsidies and the Housing (Financial Provisions) Act 1933 – Pre-War-Housing".
