= Housing, Town Planning, &c. Act 1919 =

Act of the Parliament of the United Kingdom

Housing, Town Planning, &c. Act 1919 (Note: Section 52(2).)
- Act of Parliament
- Parliament of the United Kingdom
- Long title: An Act to amend the enactments relating to the Housing of the Working Classes, Town Planning, and the acquisition of small dwellings.
- Citation: 9 & 10 Geo. 5. c. 35
- Territorial extent: England & Wales (Note: Section 51.)

Dates
- Royal assent: 31 July 1919
- Commencement: 31 July 1919 (Note: The Acts of Parliament (Commencement) Act 1793.)
- Repealed: 1 April 1986
Other legislation
Amends	Housing of the Working Classes Act 1890; Housing of the Working Classes Act 1900; Housing of the Working Classes Act 1903; Housing, Town Planning, &c. Act 1909
Amended by	Housing, &c. Act 1923; Town Planning Act 1925; Town Planning (Scotland) Act 1925; Housing Act 1936; Statute Law (Repeals) Act 1977; Statute Law (Repeals) Act 1981
Repealed by	Housing (Consequential Provisions) Act 1985

Status: Repealed

Text of statute as originally enacted

The Housing, Town Planning, &c. Act 1919 (9 & 10 Geo. 5. c. 35) was an act of the Parliament of the United Kingdom. It was also known as the Addison Act after Minister of Health, Christopher Addison, who was Minister for Housing. The act was passed to allow the building of new houses after the First World War, and marked the start of a long 20th-century tradition of state-owned housing in planned council estates. A separate act was passed for Scotland.

== Background ==
The 1919 act followed on from the Housing, Town Planning, &c. Act 1909 (9 Edw. 7. c. 44) and the 1917 Tudor Walters Committee Report into the provision of housing in the United Kingdom; the latter commissioned by Parliament with a view to postwar construction. In part, it was a response to the shocking lack of fitness amongst many recruits during World War I, which was attributed to poor living conditions. That belief summed up in a housing poster of the period that "you cannot expect to get an A1 population out of C3 homes", in reference to the period's military fitness classifications.

== Terms ==
It provided subsidies to local authorities and aimed to help finance the construction of 500,000 houses within three years.

Section 41(1) provided that the London County Council could build houses outside the County of London. The provision was used to build 'out-county' estates, such as Becontree.

== Results ==
Not all of the funding was ultimately made available, as the subsidies were scrapped in 1922 under the Geddes Axe austerity programme. Only 213,000 homes were built under the 1919 act scheme. The first to be completed were at Milton Green in Weston-super-Mare.

== Subsequent developments ==
Part I of the act repealed by section 1(1) of, and part XI of schedule 1 to, the Statute Law (Repeals) Act 1977, which came into force on 16 June 1977.

Section 52(2) of the act was repealed by section 1(1) of, and part VI of schedule 1 to, the Statute Law (Repeals) Act 1981, which came into force on 21 May 1981.

The whole act was repealed by section 3(1) of, and schedule 1 to, the Housing (Consequential Provisions) Act 1985, which came into force on 1 April 1986.

== See also ==
- English land law
- Boot house
- Housing (Financial Provisions) Act 1924
