= Housing Act 1930 =

Act of the Parliament of the United Kingdom

Housing Act 1930 (Note: Section 65(1).)
- Act of Parliament
- Parliament of the United Kingdom
- Long title: An Act to make further and better provision with respect to the clearance or improvement of unhealthy areas, the repair or demolition of insanitary houses and the housing of persons of the working classes; to amend the Housing Act, 1925, the Housing, etc., Act, 1923, the Housing (Financial Provisions) Act, 1924, and the other enactments relating to housing subsidies; and for purposes connected with the matters aforesaid.
- Citation: 20 & 21 Geo. 5. c. 39
- Territorial extent: England and Wales (Note: Section 65(3).)

Dates
- Royal assent: 1 August 1930
- Commencement: 15 August 1930 (Note: Section 65(1).)
- Repealed: 21 May 1981
Other legislation
Amends	Housing, &c. Act 1923; Housing (Financial Provisions) Act 1924; Housing Act 1925
Amended by	Local Government Act 1933; Housing Act 1935; Housing Act 1936; Housing (Financial Provisions) Act 1958
Repealed by	Statute Law (Repeals) Act 1981

Status: Repealed

Text of statute as originally enacted

The Housing Act 1930 (20 & 21 Geo. 5. c. 39), also known as the Greenwood Act, was an act of the Parliament of the United Kingdom. It encouraged mass slum clearance and councils to set to work to demolish poor quality housing and replace it with new build. Subsidies for general housing, were given, these were calculated on the number of people rehoused not the number of properties demolished. "Back-to-back" housing had finally ended.

== Context ==
This was an act of the MacDonald minority government. The minister to steer it through the house was Arthur Greenwood.

== Subsequent developments ==
The whole act, except subsection 26(5) and sections 27, 43, 44, 46, 64 and 65, were repealed by section 190 of, and the twelfth schedule to, Housing Act 1936 (26 Geo. 5 & 1 Edw. 8. c. 51), which came into force on 1 January 1937.

Section 27 and 43–46 of the act were repealed by section 59 of, and the sixth schedule to, the Housing (Financial Provisions) Act 1958 (6 & 7 Eliz. 2. c. 42), which came into force on 23 October 1958.

The whole act was repealed by section 1(1) of, and part VI of schedule 1 to, the Statute Law (Repeals) Act 1981, which came into force on 21 May 1981.
