= Housing Act 1949 =

Act of the Parliament of the United Kingdom

Housing Act 1949 (Note: Section 51(1).)
- Act of Parliament
- Parliament of the United Kingdom
- Long title: An Act to amend the Housing Act, 1936; to promote the improvement of housing accommodation by authorising the making of contributions out of the Exchequer and of grants by local authorities; to amend the Housing (Financial and Miscellaneous Provisions) Act, 1946, with respect to the amounts of contributions payable thereunder out of the Exchequer, and certain other enactments relating to the making of contributions out of the Exchequer in respect of the provision of housing accommodation; to authorise the making out of the Exchequer of contributions in respect of the provision of hostels and of grants in respect of building experiments; to extend and amend other enactments relating to housing and domestic water supply; and for purposes connected with the matters aforesaid.
- Citation: 12, 13 & 14 Geo. 6. c. 60
- Territorial extent: England and Wales; Northern Ireland (section 43); (Note: Section 51(2).)

Dates
- Royal assent: 30 July 1949
- Commencement: 30 July 1949 (Note: The Acts of Parliament (Commencement) Act 1793.)
Other legislation
| Amends | Housing Act 1936; Housing Act 1937; Housing (Financial Provisions) Act 1938; Housing (Temporary Accommodation) Act 1944; Building Materials and Housing Act 1945; Housing (Financial and Miscellaneous Provisions) Act 1946; Water Act 1948 |
| Amended by | Rent Act 1957; Housing Act 1957; Housing (Financial Provisions) Act 1958; Statute Law (Repeals) Act 1981; Housing (Consequential Provisions) Act 1985; Water Act 1989 |

Status: Partially repealed

Text of statute as originally enacted

The Housing Act 1949 (12, 13 & 14 Geo. 6. c. 60) is an act of the Parliament of the United Kingdom which enabled local authorities to acquire homes for improvement or conversion with 75% Exchequer grants. It also bestowed upon local authorities a wide range of useful powers, such as to provide restaurants or canteens and laundry facilities for tenants of municipal flats and housing estates, and to sell furniture to them. The legislation also removed the restriction imposed upon local authorities by previous pieces of housing legislation which limited them to providing housing for working-class people only. The aim of this change was to allow local authorities to develop mixed estates of houses of more varied types and sizes, thereby attracting all income groups. In addition, housing improvement grants for private landlords and owner-occupiers were introduced under the Act. According to Norman Ginsburg, this piece of legislation was the first example of a "welfarist" policy in respect of owner-occupiers, as local authorities were to direct these grants towards bringing properties up to a sixteen-point standard.

== Subsequent developments ==
Sections 5 and 43, in section 50(1), all the definitions except that of "house", in section 51(1), the words from "and the Housing Acts" onwards, and in section 51(2), the words from "except" to "thereof", were repealed by section 1(1) of, and part X of schedule 1 to, the Statute Law (Repeals) Act 1981, which came into force on 21 May 1981.

Sections 44 and 50 of the act were repealed by section 3(1) of, and schedule 1 to, the Housing (Consequential Provisions) Act 1985, which came into force on 1 April 1986.

== See also ==
- Welfare state
- National Insurance Act 1911
