= Housing (Financial and Miscellaneous Provisions) Act 1946 =

Act of the Parliament of the United Kingdom

Housing (Financial and Miscellaneous Provisions) Act 1946 (Note: Section 26(1).)
- Act of Parliament
- Parliament of the United Kingdom
- Long title: An Act to make fresh arrangements for the making of contributions grants and loans in connection with the provision of housing accommodation; to provide for matters subordinate to that purpose; to amend the enactments which relate to the making of contributions in respect of housing accommodation; to amend the law relating to the housing accounts of local authorities; and to facilitate the provision of housing accommodation in the Isles of Scilly.
- Citation: 9 & 10 Geo. 6. c. 48
- Territorial extent: England and Wales (Note: Section 26(2).)

Dates
- Royal assent: 18 April 1946
- Commencement: 18 April 1946 (Note: The Acts of Parliament (Commencement) Act 1793.)
- Repealed: 27 July 1972
Other legislation
Amends	Town Development Act 1952
Amended by	Local Government Act 1948; Housing Act 1949; Rent Act 1957; Housing Act 1957; Housing (Financial Provisions) Act 1958
Repealed by	Housing Finance Act 1972

Status: Repealed

Text of statute as originally enacted

The Housing (Financial and Miscellaneous Provisions) Act 1946 (9 & 10 Geo. 6. c. 48) was an act of the Parliament of the United Kingdom that provided large subsidies for the construction of council housing. This resulted in the completion of over 800,000 local authority houses by 1951.

== Subsequent developments ==
The whole act was repealed by section 108(4) of, and schedule 11 to, the Housing Finance Act 1972, which came into force on 27 July 1972.

== See also ==
- Housing and Local Government (Miscellaneous Provisions) Act (Northern Ireland) 1946, 1946 Chapter 4

== Bibliography ==
- Capitalism and public policy in the UK by Tom Burden and Mike Campbell
