= Housing (Consequential Provisions) Act 1985 =

Act of the Parliament of the United Kingdom

Housing (Consequential Provisions) Act 1985 (Note: Section 6(1).)
- Act of Parliament
- Parliament of the United Kingdom
- Long title: An Act to make provision for repeals, consequential amendments, transitional matters and savings in connection with the consolidation of enactments in the Housing Act 1985, the Housing Associations Act 1985 and the Landlord and Tenant Act 1985.
- Citation: 1985 c. 71
- Territorial extent: England and Wales; Scotland; Northern Ireland; (Note: Section 6(3)–(5).)

Dates
- Royal assent: 30 October 1985
- Commencement: 1 April 1986 (Note: Section 6(2).)

Other legislation
- Amends: See § Repealed enactments
- Repeals/revokes: See § Repealed enactments
- Amended by: Airports Act 1986; Building Societies Act 1986; Housing (Scotland) Act 1987; Income and Corporation Taxes Act 1988; Capital Allowances Act 1990; Planning (Consequential Provisions) Act 1990; Taxation of Chargeable Gains Act 1992; Statute Law (Repeals) Act 1993; Employment Tribunals Act 1996; Employment Rights Act 1996; National Health Service (Consequential Provisions) Act 2006; Co-operative and Community Benefit Societies Act 2014
- Relates to: Housing Act 1985; Housing Associations Act 1985; Landlord and Tenant Act 1985

Status: Partially repealed

Text of statute as originally enacted

Revised text of statute as amended

Text of the Housing (Consequential Provisions) Act 1985 as in force today (including any amendments) within the United Kingdom, from legislation.gov.uk.

The Housing (Consequential Provisions) Act 1985 (c. 71) is an act of the Parliament of the United Kingdom that made provision for repeals, consequential amendments, transitional matters and savings in connection with the consolidation of enactments in the Housing Act 1985, the Housing Associations Act 1985 and the Landlord and Tenant Act 1985.

== Provisions ==
=== Repealed enactments ===
Section 3(1) of the act repealed 101 enactments, listed in parts I, II and III of the first schedule to the act, which applied to England and Wales, Scotland and Northern Ireland, respectively.

Part I - England and Wales
Citation	Short title	Extent of repeal
62 & 63 Vict. c. 44	Small Dwellings Acquisition Act 1899	The whole act.
4 & 5 Geo. 5. c. 31	Housing Act 1914	The whole act.
9 & 10 Geo. 5. c. 35	Housing, Town Planning, &c. Act 1919	The whole act, so far as unrepealed.
13 & 14 Geo. 5. c. 24	Housing, &c. Act 1923	The whole act, so far as unrepealed.
15 & 16 Geo. 5. c. 5	Law of Property (Amendment) Act 1924	In paragraph 5 of Schedule 9, the words "The Small Dwellings Acquisition Act 1899 and other".
25 & 26 Geo. 5. c. 40	Housing Act 1935	The whole act, so far as unrepealed.
26 Geo. 5. & 1 Edw. 8. c. 49	Public Health Act 1936	Part IX.
12 & 13 Geo. 6. c. 60	Housing Act 1949	Sections 44 and 50.
5 & 6 Eliz. 2. c. 56	Housing Act 1957	The whole act.
6 & 7 Eliz. 2. c. 42	Housing (Financial Provisions) Act 1958	The whole act.
7 & 8 Eliz. 2. c. 33	House Purchase and Housing Act 1959	The whole act.
7 & 8 Eliz. 2. c. 34	Housing (Underground Rooms) Act 1959	The whole act.
7 & 8 Eliz. 2. c. 53	Town and Country Planning Act 1959	Section 26(5)(a). Section 58(4). In Schedule 7, the amendments of the Housing Act 1957.
9 & 10 Eliz. 2. c. 33	Land Compensation Act 1961	Section 8(7)(d). In Schedule 4, paragraphs 9 and 10.
9 & 10 Eliz. 2. c. 62	Trustee Investments Act 1961	In Schedule 4, paragraph 6.
9 & 10 Eliz. 2. c. 65	Housing Act 1961	The whole act.
10 & 11 Eliz. 2. c. 50	Landlord and Tenant Act 1962	The whole act.
1963 c. 33	London Government Act 1963	Section 21. Schedule 8.
1964 c. 56	Housing Act 1964	Parts I and IV. Sections 96, 102, 103 and 106. In section 108—(a) subsection (1)(a); (b) in subsection (4) the words "subject to the following subsection"; (c) subsection (5). Schedules 1 to 4.
1965 c. 25	Finance Act 1965	Section 93.
1965 c. 56	Compulsory Purchase Act 1965	In section 4, the words from "For the purposes" to the end. In section 11(2), the second paragraph. Sections 34 and 35. In Schedule 7, the entry relating to the Housing Act 1957.
1965 c. 81	Housing (Slum Clearance Compensation) Act 1965	The whole act.
1967 c. 29	Housing Subsidies Act 1967	The whole act.
1967 c. 88	Leasehold Reform Act 1967	In section 30(7)(b), the words from "including" to "1961". In Schedule 5, paragraph 8(4).
1968 c. 13	National Loans Act 1968	In section 6(1), the references to section 92(2) of the Housing Act 1935 and section 7(2)(a) of the Housing Act 1961. In Schedule 1, the entries relating to the Housing (Financial Provisions) Act 1958, the House Purchase and Housing Act 1959 and the Housing Act 1961.
1968 c. 42	Prices and Incomes Act 1968	The whole act so far as unrepealed.
1969 c. 33	Housing Act 1969	Parts II, IV and V. Sections 70 to 72, 75, 84 to 90. In section 91—(a) subsections (2) to (4); (b) in subsection (5) the words "except sections 78 and 79". Schedules 4 to 9.
1970 c. 42	Local Authority Social Services Act 1970	In Schedule 1, the entry relating to section 9(1)(b) of the Housing (Homeless Persons) Act 1977.
1971 c. 23	Courts Act 1971	In Schedule 9, the entry relating to s.14(5) of the Housing Act 1957.
1971 c. 76	Housing Act 1971	The whole act.
1971 c. 78	Town and Country Planning Act 1971	In Schedule 23—(a) in Part I, the entry relating to the London Government Act 1963; (b) in Part II, the amendment of section 21(4)(a)(i) of the London Government Act 1963 and the entry relating to the Housing Act 1969.
1972 c. 11	Superannuation Act 1972	In Schedule 6, paragraph 47.
1972 c. 47	Housing Finance Act 1972	The whole act.
1972 c. 70	Local Government Act 1972	In section 131(2), paragraphs (i), (jj) and (l). Sections 193 and 194. In Schedule 13, paragraph 21(6). Schedule 22.
1972 c. 71	Criminal Justice Act 1972	Section 32.
1973 c. 5	Housing (Amendment) Act 1973	The whole act.
1973 c. 26	Land Compensation Act 1973	In section 37(2), the words from "In this subsection" to the end. In section 39, subsections (5) and (8A). In section 73(4), the words "paragraph 2 of".
1974 c. 7	Local Government Act 1974	Section 1(5)(c). Section 37.
1974 c. 39	Consumer Credit Act 1974	In Schedule 4, paragraph 18.
1974 c. 44	Housing Act 1974	Part I, except section 11. Parts II to VIII. Sections 105 to 117, 121 to 130. In section 131—(a) subsection (2); (b) in subsection (5), the words from the beginning to "VIII and", from "105" to "110 to" and "124, 125 and 126". Schedules 1 to 7 and 9 to 12. In Schedule 13, paragraphs 3 to 11, 19 to 21, 24, 30 to 32, 35, 36 and 40(6). Schedules 14 and 15.
1974 c. 49	Insurance Companies Act 1974	In Schedule 1, the entry relating to the Housing Subsidies Act 1967.
1975 c. 6	Housing Rents and Subsidies Act 1975	The whole act.
1975 c. 18	Social Security (Consequential Provisions) Act 1975	In Schedule 2, paragraph 49.
1975 c. 45	Finance (No. 2) Act 1975	In section 69(3)(e), the words "housing society". In section 71(3), the words from "'housing society'" to "1964".
1975 c. 55	Statutory Corporations (Financial Provisions) Act 1975	In Schedule 4, paragraph 8.
1975 c. 67	Housing Finance (Special Provisions) Act 1975	The whole act.
1975 c. 72	Children Act 1975	In Schedule 3, paragraphs 15, 66 and 83.
1975 c. 76	Local Land Charges Act 1975	In Schedule 1, the entries relating to the Housing Act 1961 and the Housing Act 1974.
1976 c. 57	Local Government (Miscellaneous Provisions) Act 1976	Sections 9 and 10.
1976 c. 75	Development of Rural Wales Act 1976	In Schedule 3, paragraph 30(4). In Schedule 7, paragraphs 8, 9, and 12 to 15.
1976 c. 80	Rent (Agriculture) Act 1976	In Schedule 8, paragraphs 4 to 6, 9 to 11 and 27 to 31.
1977 c. 42	Rent Act 1977	Section 118. Section 145. In section 149(1)(a)(iii), the words ", and section 136". In Schedule 23, paragraphs 22 to 28, 31 to 36, 47, 48, 55, 59 to 66, 69 and 70.
1977 c. 48	Housing (Homeless Persons) Act 1977	The whole act.
1978 c. 27	Home Purchase Assistance and Housing Corporation Guarantee Act 1978	The whole act.
1978 c. 44	Employment Protection (Consolidation) Act 1978	In Schedule 16, paragraph 31.
1978 c. 48	Homes Insulation Act 1978	The whole act.
1979 c. 37	Banking Act 1979	In Schedule 6, Part I, paragraph 11.
1980 c. 9	Reserve Forces Act 1980	In Schedule 9, paragraph 13.
1980 c. 43	Magistrates' Courts Act 1980	In Schedule 1, paragraph 25. In Schedule 7, paragraph 22.
1980 c. 48	Finance Act 1980	In section 97(3), paragraph (g).
1980 c. 51	Housing Act 1980	Part I. Section 80. In section 81(1), the words "secure tenancies,". In section 83, the words "a secure tenant," and "for the purposes of Chapter II of Part I of this Act or, as the case may be,". In section 85(1), the words "in Chapter II of Part I of this Act or" and "that Chapter or, as the case may be,". Section 87. Parts V to VIII. Sections 134 to 137, 139, 144 to 147 and 149. In section 150, the definitions of "the 1957 Act", "the 1969 Act", "the 1972 Act", "the 1974 Act", "the 1975 Act" and "the 1984 Act". In section 151(1), the words "22(1), 33(2),", "or paragraph 11 of Schedule 3" and "8(5),". Section 151(4). Section 153(1) and (2). In section 153(3) the words from "90 to" to "137 to". Section 154(2). Schedules 1 to 4A. In Schedule 10, paragraph 1(3). Schedules 11 to 13, 16 to 20, 23 and 24. In Schedule 25, paragraphs 7 to 9, 11 to 13, 18 to 31, 34, 62, 69, 71, 74 and 76.
1980 c. 65	Local Government, Planning and Land Act 1980	In section 47—(a) in subsection (4)(b) the words "6(2) and (3) and"; (b) subsection (4)(c); (c) subsection (6)(b). Section 54(5)(b) and (6)(c). Section 68(3) and (6). Section 156(1) and (2). In section 159(1)(b), the words "or IX (common lodging houses)". In Schedule 6, paragraphs 7 to 9 and 17 to 20. In Schedule 27, paragraph 14. In Schedule 33, paragraphs 6 and 8.
1981 c. 54	Supreme Court Act 1981	In Schedule 5, the amendment of the Small Dwellings Acquisition Act 1899.
1981 c. 64	New Towns Act 1981	Section 50(4) to (6) and (8). Section 80(4)(a). In Schedule 10, paragraph 3(3)(d). In Schedule 11, paragraphs 9 and 10. In Schedule 12, paragraphs 7, 8, 13, 14, 25 and 27(a), (d).
1981 c. 65	Trustee Savings Banks Act 1981	In Schedule 6, the entry relating to the Home Purchase Assistance and Housing Corporation Guarantee Act 1978.
1981 c. 67	Acquisition of Land Act 1981	In Schedule 4—(a) in the Table in paragraph 1, the entries relating to the Housing Act 1957, the Housing Act 1969 and the Housing Act 1974; (b) paragraph 10; (c) in paragraph 14(7), the reference to section 34(1) of the Compulsory Purchase Act 1965.
1982 c. 24	Social Security and Housing Benefits Act 1982	In section 35(1), in the definition of "Housing Revenue Account rebate", the words "(within the meaning of the Housing Finance Act 1972)". In Schedule 4, paragraph 6(2) to (4).
1982 c. 39	Finance Act 1982	Section 153(3).
1982 c. 48	Criminal Justice Act 1982	In Schedule 3, the entries relating to provisions of the Housing Act 1957, the Landlord and Tenant Act 1962 and the Housing Act 1980.
1982 c. 50	Insurance Companies Act 1982	In Schedule 5, paragraph 4.
1983 c. 29	Miscellaneous Financial Provisions Act 1983	In Schedule 2, the entry relating to the Housing Act 1974.
1984 c. 12	Telecommunications Act 1984	In Schedule 4, paragraph 35.
1984 c. 22	Public Health (Control of Disease) Act 1984	In Schedule 2, paragraph 2.
1984 c. 28	County Courts Act 1984	In Schedule 2, paragraphs 27 and 28.
1984 c. 29	Housing and Building Control Act 1984	Sections 1 to 38. Schedules 1 to 7. In Schedule 11, paragraphs 1 to 3, and 6 to 34.
1984 c. 50	Housing Defects Act 1984	The whole act.
1984 c. 55	Building Act 1984	Section 89(2). In Schedule 5, in paragraph 2, the words "and the Housing Act 1957". In Schedule 6, paragraph 6.
1985 c. 9	Companies Consolidation (Consequential Provisions) Act 1985	In Schedule 2, the entries relating to the Housing Act 1964, the Housing Subsidies Act 1967, the Housing Act 1974, the Housing Act 1980 and the Housing and Building Control Act 1984.
1985 c. 51	Local Government Act 1985	In Schedule 8, paragraphs 12(1) and (3) to (5) and 14(3). In Schedule 13, in paragraph 21, the words "and section 80(1)(c) of the Housing Act 1980". In Schedule 14, paragraphs 58(a) to (d) and (f) to (h), 64 and 65.

Part II - Scotland
Citation	Short title	Extent of repeal
7 & 8 Eliz. 2. c. 33	House Purchase and Housing Act 1959	Section 1.
1964 c. 56	Housing Act 1964	Part I.
1965 c. 25	Finance Act 1965	Section 93.
1966 c. 49	Housing (Scotland) Act 1966	In section 1, the words "section 152 of this Act and". Section 152. Section 156. Section 158.
1968 c. 31	Housing (Financial Provisions) (Scotland) Act 1968	Sections 23 and 24.
1972 c. 11	Superannuation Act 1972	In Schedule 6, paragraph 47.
1972 c. 46	Housing (Financial Provisions) (Scotland) Act 1972	Sections 51 to 59.
1972 c. 47	Housing Finance Act 1972	Section 77(2).
1973 c. 65	Local Government (Scotland) Act 1973	In Schedule 12, paragraphs 4 and 10.
1974 c. 44	Housing Act 1974	Part I, except section 11. Part II, except section 18(2) to (6) and Schedule 3. Part III. In Schedule 13, paragraphs 21 and 23(2) to (4). In Schedule 14, paragraphs 1, 2 and 6.
1975 c. 28	Housing Rents and Subsidies (Scotland) Act 1975	Section 12. In Schedule 3, paragraphs 12 and 13.
1975 c. 45	Finance (No. 2) Act 1975	In section 69(3)(e), the words "housing society". In section 71(3), the words from "'housing society'" to "1964".
1977 c. 48	Housing (Homeless Persons) Act 1977	In section 6—(a) in subsection (1)(a), the words "Part V of the Housing Act 1957 or"; (b) in subsection (2), the words "section 113(2) of the Housing Act 1957 or". Section 7(11)(a). In section 10, the words "section 111 of the Housing Act 1957 or". In section 13—(a) in subsections (2), (3), (5) and (6), the words "or the Greater London Council"; (b) in subsection (4) the words "nor the Greater London Council"; (c) in subsections (5) and (7) the words "as the case may be"; (d) in subsection (10) the words "the Housing Finance Act 1972 and". In section 19(1)—(a) in the definition of "development corporation", paragraph (a); (b) in the definition of "housing authority" the words from "as respects England and Wales" to "Scotland"; (c) in the definition of "relevant authority", paragraphs (b) and (d); (d) the definition of "social services authority". Section 20(2). In section 21—(a) in subsection (2), the words from the beginning to "Scotland"; (b) in subsection (3), the words from "(a) in England" to "in Scotland".
1978 c. 14	Housing (Financial Provisions) (Scotland) Act 1978	In Schedule 2, paragraph 3.
1978 c. 27	Home Purchase Assistance and Housing Corporation Guarantee Act 1978	Sections 4 and 5. Section 6(2).
1978 c. 48	Homes Insulation Act 1978	In section 1(8)—(a) paragraphs (a) and (b); (b) in paragraph (c), the words "in Scotland". Section 3.
1980 c. 51	Housing Act 1980	Part VIII. In Schedule 16, Part II. In Schedule 17, paragraphs 1, 2 and 3. Schedule 18. In Schedule 25—(a) in paragraph 11 the words from "and in paragraph 3(2)(a)" to the end; (b) paragraphs 12, 13, 24, 25 and 70.
1980 c. 52	Tenants' Rights, &c. (Scotland) Act 1980	Section 9. In section 31—(a) in subsection (1) the words "or the Housing Corporation" and "or, as the case may be, the Housing Corporation"; (b) in subsection (2) the words "or, as the case may be, the Housing Corporation"; (c) in subsection (4) the words "with the Housing Corporation and".

Part III - Northern Ireland
Citation	Short title	Extent of repeal
1975 c. 45	Finance (No. 2) Act 1975	In section 69(3)(e), the words "housing society". In section 71(3), the words from "'housing society'" to "1964".
1978 c. 27	Home Purchase Assistance and Housing Corporation Guarantee Act 1978	Section 4. Section 6(3).
1978 c. 48	Homes Insulation Act 1978	Section 3.
1980 c. 51	Housing Act 1980	Section 111(8). Sections 152(1), 153 and 155. In Schedule 25, paragraphs 11, 12, 18 and 19.

== Subsequent developments ==
Several paragraphs of Schedule 2, which made consequential amendments to other legislation in connection with the consolidation, have been repealed by subsequent acts. The Building Societies Act 1986 repealed paragraphs 5 and 6. The Housing (Scotland) Act 1987 repealed paragraphs 10, 16, 17, 37, 39, 40, 42 and 45, which related to Scottish provisions. The Income and Corporation Taxes Act 1988 repealed paragraphs 18, 28 and 31. The Planning (Consequential Provisions) Act 1990 repealed paragraph 22 and part of paragraph 24. The Coal Mining Subsidence Act 1991 repealed paragraph 2. Various further paragraphs have been repealed by subsequent legislation, including the Co-operative and Community Benefit Societies Act 2014, which repealed paragraph 8.
