= Housing (Financial Provisions) Act 1958 =

Act of the Parliament of the United Kingdom

Housing (Financial Provisions) Act 1958 (Note: Section 61(1).)
- Act of Parliament
- Parliament of the United Kingdom
- Long title: An Act to consolidate certain enactments relating to the giving of financial assistance for the provision of housing accommodation and to other financial matters.
- Citation: 6 & 7 Eliz. 2. c. 42
- Territorial extent: England and Wales (Note: Section 61(2).)

Dates
- Royal assent: 23 July 1958
- Commencement: 23 October 1958 (Note: Section 61(3).)
- Repealed: 1 April 1986
Other legislation
Amends	See § Repealed enactments
Repeals/revokes	See § Repealed enactments
Amended by	New Towns Act 1959; London Government Act 1963; Public Works Loans Act 1964; Housing Subsidies Act 1967; National Loans Act 1968; Rent Act 1968; Statute Law (Repeals) Act 1981
Repealed by	Housing (Consequential Provisions) Act 1985

Status: Repealed

Text of statute as originally enacted

The Housing (Financial Provisions) Act 1958 (6 & 7 Eliz. 2. c. 42) was an act of the Parliament of the United Kingdom that consolidated enactments relating to financial assistance for the provision of housing accommodation in England and Wales.

== Provisions ==
=== Repealed enactments ===
Section 59 of the act repealed 20 enactments, listed in the sixth schedule to the act.

Citation	Short title	Extent of repeal
13 & 14 Geo. 5. c. 24	Housing, &c. Act 1923	Section one. Sections three and four.
14 & 15 Geo. 5. c. 35	Housing (Financial Provisions) Act 1924	Sections one to eleven. Section fourteen. In section fifteen the words "under this Act and". The First Schedule. In the Second Schedule the amendment of section one of the Housing, &c. Act, 1923.
20 & 21 Geo. 5. c. 6	Housing (Revision of Contributions) Act 1929	The whole act.
20 & 21 Geo. 5. c. 39	Housing Act 1930	Section twenty-seven. Sections forty-three to forty-six.
21 & 22 Geo. 5. c. 39	Housing (Rural Authorities) Act 1931	Section one. In section five the words "the Minister of Health and" and the words "the Minister or, as the case may be,".
26 Geo. 5 & 1 Edw. 8. c. 51	Housing Act 1936	The whole act.
1 & 2 Geo. 6. c. 16	Housing (Financial Provisions) Act 1938	The whole act.
2 & 3 Geo. 6. c. 31	Civil Defence Act 1939	Section thirty-four.
2 & 3 Geo. 6. c. 40	London Government Act 1939	In section one hundred and twenty-six, in subsection (6) the words "section one hundred and thirty-three of the Housing Act, 1936, and by ".
7 & 8 Geo. 6. c. 33	Housing (Temporary Provisions) Act 1944	The whole act.
9 & 10 Geo. 6. c. 48	Housing (Financial and Miscellaneous Provisions) Act 1946	Sections one to thirteen. Sections fifteen to twenty-four. In section twenty-six, in subsection (1) the words from "and the Housing Acts" to the end of the subsection. The First Schedule. In the Second Schedule each entry except that relating to the Housing (Rural Workers) Act, 1926. The Third Schedule.
9 & 10 Geo. 6. c. 68	New Towns Act 1946	Section eight. In section twenty-four, paragraph (5).
11 & 12 Geo. 6. c. 26	Local Government Act 1948	In section one hundred and twenty-six, subsection (3) and paragraph (6) of subsection (4).
12, 13 & 14 Geo. 6. c. 60	Housing Act 1949	Section one. Section four. In section five, subsections (1), (2), (3) and (5). Parts II and III. Sections forty-seven to forty-nine. In section fifty-one, subsections (3) and (4). The Schedules.
15 & 16 Geo. 6 & 1 Eliz. 2. c. 53	Housing Act 1952	The whole act.
2 & 3 Eliz. 2. c. 53	Housing Repairs and Rents Act 1954	Part I, except section nineteen and subsection (1) of section twenty-two.
3 & 4 Eliz. 2. c. 24	Requisitioned Houses and Housing (Amendment) Act 1955	Section twelve.
4 & 5 Eliz. 2. c. 33	Housing Subsidies Act 1956	Sections one to eight. In section ten, subsection (1). In section eleven, subsection (1) and in subsection (2) all the definitions save those of "development corporation", "dwelling", "local authority" and "the Minister". In section twelve, subsections (2) and (4). In the First Schedule, paragraphs 1 to 12. The Second and Third Schedules.
5 & 6 Eliz. 2. c. 25	Rent Act 1957	In the Sixth Schedule, paragraphs 11, 13 and 14.
SI 1956/2015	Housing Subsidies Order 1956	The whole Order.

== Subsequent developments ==
Sections 19 to 22 and certain other provisions of the act were repealed by the Housing Subsidies Act 1967 (c. 29).

The whole act was repealed by section 3(1) of, and schedule 1 to, the Housing (Consequential Provisions) Act 1985, which came into force on 1 April 1986.
