= Housing Act 1936 =

Act of the Parliament of the United Kingdom

Housing Act 1936 (Note: Section 191(1).)
- Act of Parliament
- Parliament of the United Kingdom
- Long title: An Act to consolidate the Housing Acts, 1925 to 1935, and certain other enactments relating to housing.
- Citation: 26 Geo. 5 & 1 Edw. 8. c. 51
- Territorial extent: England and Wales (Note: Section 191(3).)

Dates
- Royal assent: 31 July 1936
- Commencement: 1 January 1937 (Note: Section 191(2).)
- Repealed: 23 October 1958
Other legislation
Amends	See § Repealed enactments
Repeals/revokes	See § Repealed enactments
Amended by	Public Works Loans (No. 2) Act 1946; Town and Country Planning Act 1947; Local Government Act 1948; Housing Act 1949; Licensing Act 1953; Housing Act 1957
Repealed by	Housing (Financial Provisions) Act 1958

Status: Repealed

Text of statute as originally enacted

The Housing Act 1936 (26 Geo. 5 & 1 Edw. 8. c. 51) was an act of the Parliament of the United Kingdom that consolidated enactments relating to housing in England and Wales.

== Provisions ==
=== Repealed enactments ===
Section 190 of the act repealed 12 enactments, listed in the twelfth schedule to the act.

Citation	Short title	Extent of repeal
9 Edw. 7. c. 44	Housing, Town Planning, &c. Act 1909	In section seventy-one the words "and the housing of the working classes" in both places where those words occur.
9 & 10 Geo. 5. c. 35	Housing, Town Planning, &c. Act 1919	Subsection (4) of section twenty-four and section thirty-six.
14 & 15 Geo. 5. c. 35	Housing (Financial Provisions) Act 1924	Section eight.
15 & 16 Geo. 5. c. 14	Housing Act 1925	The whole act.
16 & 17 Geo. 5. c. xcviii	London County Council (General Powers) Act 1926	Section thirty-eight.
17 & 18 Geo. 5. c. xxii	London County Council (General Powers) Act 1927	Section sixty.
18 & 19 Geo. 5. c. lxxvii	London County Council (General Powers) Act 1928	Section fifty-four.
19 & 20 Geo. 5. c. lxxxvii	London County Council (General Powers) Act 1929	Section fifty-six.
20 & 21 Geo. 5. c. 39	Housing Act 1930	The whole act, except subsection (5) of section twenty-six and sections twenty-seven, forty-three, forty-four, forty-six, sixty-four and sixty-five.
22 & 23 Geo. 5. c. lxx	London County Council (General Powers) Act 1932	Section thirteen.
23 & 24 Geo. 5. c. 15	Housing (Financial Provisions) Act 1933	Section two.
25 & 26 Geo. 5. c. 40	Housing Act 1935	The whole act, except subsection (6) of section twenty-seven, sections thirty-seven to thirty-nine, subsection (2) of section sixty-two, and sections ninety-two and one hundred.

== Subsequent developments ==
Parts I to IV of the act, together with substantial portions of Parts V, VI, VII and VIII, were repealed by section 191 of, and the eleventh schedule to, the Housing Act 1957 (5 & 6 Eliz. 2. c. 56), which came into force on 1 September 1957.

The whole act was repealed by section 59 of, and the sixth schedule to, the Housing (Financial Provisions) Act 1958 (6 & 7 Eliz. 2. c. 42), which came into force on 23 October 1958.
