= Re Golay's Will Trusts =

Re Golay’s Will Trusts
- Court: High Court
- Citation: [1965] 1 WLR 969

Keywords
- Trusts

Re Golay’s Will Trusts [1965] 1 WLR 969 is an English trusts law case, concerning the requirement of subject matter to be sufficiently certain.

== Facts ==
Adrian Golay wrote a will saying that he wanted Mrs Bridgewater ‘to enjoy one of my flats during her lifetime and to receive a reasonable income from my other properties …’ The will was challenged and it was questioned whether the clause was certain enough to be enforced, because it was not clear which flat, or what income would be reasonable.

== Judgment ==
Ungoed-Thomas J held the trust was sufficiently certain.

The court is constantly involved in making such objective assessments of what is reasonable and it is not to be deterred from doing so because subjective influences can never be wholly excluded. In my view the testator intended by ‘reasonable income’ the yardstick which the court could and would apply in quantifying the amount so that the direction in the will is not in my view defeated by uncertainty.

== See also ==
- English trust law
