= Housing Act 1935 =

Act of the Parliament of the United Kingdom

Housing Act 1935 (Note: Section 100(1).)
- Act of Parliament
- Parliament of the United Kingdom
- Long title: An Act to make further and better provision for the abatement and prevention of overcrowding, the re-development of urban areas in connection with the provision of housing accommodation therein, and the reconditioning of buildings, to make provision for the establishment of a housing advisory committee and of commissions for the management of local authorities' houses, to amend the enactments relating to the housing operations of public utility societies and other bodies, to provide for the consolidation of housing accounts, to amend the enactments relating to housing; and for purposes connected with the matters aforesaid.
- Citation: 25 & 26 Geo. 5. c. 40
- Territorial extent: England and Wales (Note: Section 100(4).)

Dates
- Royal assent: 2 August 1935
- Commencement: 2 August 1935 (Note: The Acts of Parliament (Commencement) Act 1793.)
- Repealed: 1 April 1986
Other legislation
Amends	Housing Act 1921
Amended by	Housing Act 1936; Housing Act 1957; National Loans Act 1968; Statute Law (Repeals) Act 1981
Repealed by	Housing (Consequential Provisions) Act 1985

Status: Repealed

Text of statute as originally enacted

The Housing Act 1935 (25 & 26 Geo. 5. c. 40) was an act of the Parliament of the United Kingdom. It required every local authority to submit a programme of building and demolition aimed at eliminating slums from their area.

== Subsequent developments ==
The whole act, except subsection (6) of section 27, sections 37–39, subsection 62(2), and sections 92 and 100, were repealed by section 190 of, and the twelfth schedule to, Housing Act 1936 (26 Geo. 5 & 1 Edw. 8. c. 51), which came into force on 1 January 1937.

Section 92(1), in section 100(1), the words from "and the Act of 1925" onwards, and section 100(2) of the act were repealed by section 1(1) of, and part VI of schedule 1 to, the Statute Law (Repeals) Act 1981, which came into force on 21 May 1981.

The whole act was repealed by section 3(1) of, and part I of the schedule 1 to, the Housing (Consequential Provisions) Act 1985, which came into force on 1 April 1986.
