= Repington v Roberts-Gawen =

- Court: Court of Appeal
- Full case name: Repington v Roberts-Gawen or In re Roberts
- Citation: (1881-82) LR 19 Ch D 520

Keywords
- Trust, formation

Repington v Roberts-Gawen (1881–82) LR 19 Ch D 520 is a leading English trust law case, concerning the requirement of intention to create a trust, and the requisite level of certainty in the beneficiaries.

== Facts ==
Miss Roberts’ will said her bank annuities worth £8753, 5 shillings were to go on trust, “for life unto any immediate or direct descendants of my said brother or nephew who shall bear the name of Roberts-Gawen only, and from and after his or her decease, or in case of failure of any such immediate or direct descendant of my said brother or nephew who shall bear the name of Roberts-Gawen only,” upon trust for certain specified charitable societies. That was her brother’s new last name, who had an insane son and a daughter. The daughter had adopted her husband's name, and together they had a son (Miss Roberts' grand-nephew). By royal licence the grand-nephew assumed the name Roberts-Gawen. Then there were no other descendants. The question was whether the grand-nephew could inherit, given that the family name had changed.

== Judgment ==
=== High Court ===
Hall VC held that the trust under the will was invalid. The trusts for subsequent life interests of the brother were void for remoteness. The grand-nephew appealed.

It is extremely difficult to say what was the meaning and intention of this testatrix in framing this very singular will, and very difficult to determine whether she intended a single enjoyment, a collective enjoyment, or a successive enjoyment on the part of the persons who are to take under this disposition.

[...]

The difficulty of determining the true construction of these dispositions favours the conclusion that upon the whole this is a case in which the limitations were not intended to be confined to one particular taker, but were intended to include a series of persons taking as “descendants” in the ordinary sense of the word, that is to say, singly and separately and successively according to the ordinary mode of limitation or descent of a landed property. All these are however questions of immense difficulty, so that I am not at all sure, notwithstanding my disinclination to hold the gift void for uncertainty, that such might not be the true result in this particular case.

[...]

It therefore appears to me that the claim of the charities under the gift over fails on every ground, and that the claim of the first Defendant, Charles G. Roberts-Gawen, fails also. The result is that the £7800 New £3 per Cents passed, subject to the life interests of Admiral Roberts-Gawen and his son therein, under the residuary gift in the will of the testatrix, to her brother Admiral Gawen, and subsequently under the residuary gift in the admiral's will.

=== Court of Appeal ===
The Court of Appeal held the trust was not void but was instead limited because each descendant had a gift for life. Lord Jessel MR said the following.

It is one of the class of cases in which the persuasion of my own mind has always been that the testatrix had no particular intention as to the point in question, her mind not having been directed to it. In such a case, when we talk of the intention of a testator or testatrix, what we really mean is the fair interpretation to be given to the words used. There is some ground for the Vice-Chancellor's saying, “I am not at all sure, notwithstanding my disinclination to hold the gift void for uncertainty, that such might not be the true result in this particular case.” But the modern doctrine is not to hold a will void for uncertainty unless it is utterly impossible to put a meaning upon it. The duty of the Court is to put a fair meaning on the terms used, and not, as was said in one case, to repose on the easy pillow of saying that the whole is void for uncertainty.

== See also ==
- English trust law
