= Landlord =

Owner of a rented building, land or real estate

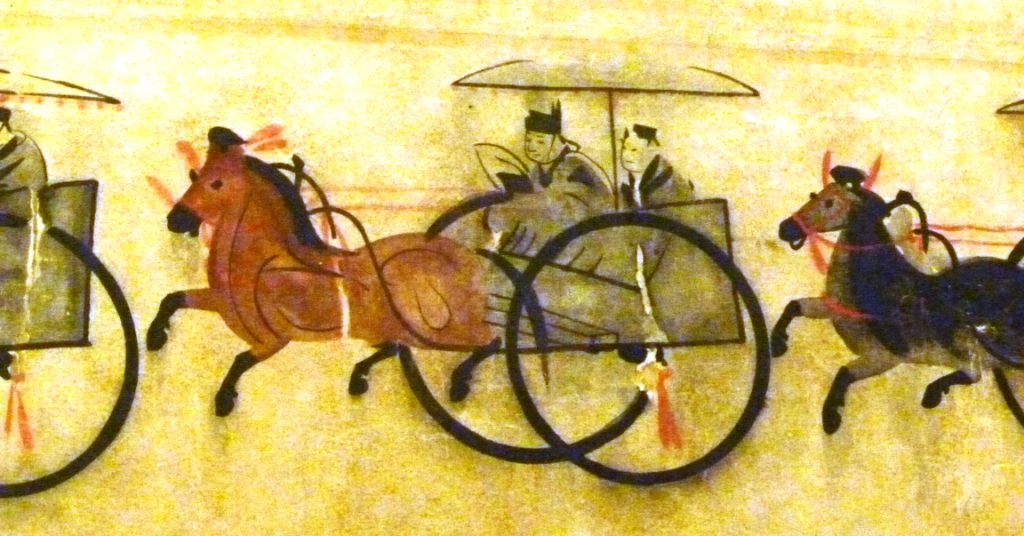
Powerful landlord in chariot, Eastern Han 25–220 CE. Hebei, China

A landlord is the owner of property such as a farm, house, apartment, condominium, land, or real estate that is rented or leased to an individual or business, known as a tenant (also called a lessee or renter). The term landlord applies when a juristic person occupies this position. Alternative terms include lessor and owner. For female property owners, the term landlady may be used. In the United Kingdom, the manager of a pub, officially a licensed victualler, is also referred to as the landlord/landlady. In political economy, landlord specifically refers to someone who owns natural resources (such as land, excluding buildings) from which they derive rent, a form of passive income.

== History ==
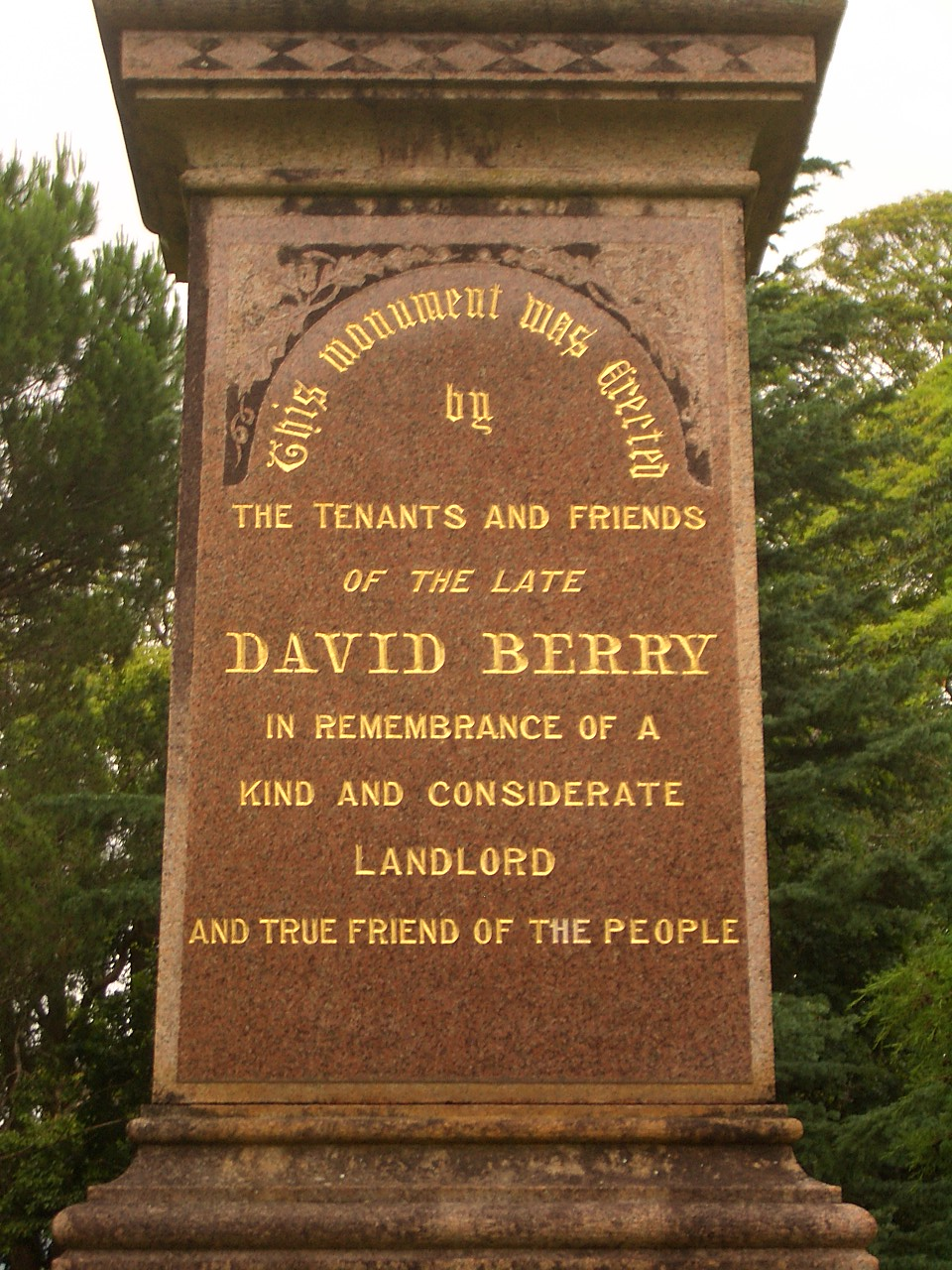
David Berry owned much of what is now known as his namesake town of Berry.

The concept of a landlord can be traced to the feudal system of manoralism (seignorialism), where landed estates were owned by Lords of the Manor (mesne lords). These lords were typically members of the lower nobility who later formed the rank of knights during the high medieval period. They held their fiefs through subinfeudation, though in some cases land was directly subject to members of higher nobility, such as the royal domain owned directly by a king, or the Holy Roman Empire's imperial villages which were directly subject to the emperor. This medieval system evolved from the villas and latifundia (large, peasant-worked farmsteads) of the Roman Empire. In modern times, the term "landlord" refers to a property owner who charges rent to a tenant.

== Owner and tenant responsibilities ==
A rental agreement, or lease, is the contract that defines the terms of a rental arrangement. These terms include the rental price, penalties for late payments, the duration of the rental or lease, and the notice period required before either party can cancel the agreement. Generally, responsibilities are divided as follows: homeowners handle repairs and property maintenance, while tenants keep the property clean and safe.

Many property owners hire property management companies to manage rental details. These companies typically advertise the property, show it to potential tenants, negotiate and prepare written leases or licence agreements, collect rent, and perform necessary repairs.

=== United States ===
In the United States, residential landlord-tenant disputes are primarily governed by state law rather than federal law, particularly regarding property and contracts. State laws, and sometimes city or county laws, establish the requirements for eviction. Generally, landlords can only evict tenants before a lease expires for specific legally valid reasons, though they can typically end the rental relationship without giving a reason when the lease term concludes. Some jurisdictions have enacted rent control or rent regulation laws that limit how much landlords can charge. There is also an implied warranty of habitability that requires landlords to maintain safe, decent, and habitable housing with basic safety features like smoke detectors and secure doors. Most common disputes arise from either the landlord failing to provide services or the tenant failing to pay rent—with service issues sometimes leading to payment problems. As typically explained in the lease, withholding rent constitutes justifiable grounds for eviction. City ordinances can also influence rental policies, such as the increasing adoption of source-of-income anti-discrimination rules. Tenants unions can also affect housing policy through political organization.

=== Canada ===
In Canada, residential homeowner–tenant disputes are primarily governed by provincial law regarding property and contracts. Provincial law sets the requirements for eviction of a tenant. Generally, there are a limited number of reasons for which a landlord can evict a tenant. Some provinces have laws establishing the maximum rent a landlord can charge, known as rent control, or rent regulation, and related eviction. There is also an implied warranty of habitability, whereby a landlord must maintain safe, decent and habitable housing, meeting minimum safety requirements.

=== United Kingdom ===
==== Residential rental market (tenancies) ====
Private sector renting is largely governed by many of the Landlord and Tenant Acts, in particular the Landlord and Tenant Act 1985 which sets bare minimum standards in tenants' rights against their landlords. Another key statute is the Housing Act 2004. Rents can be freely increased at the end of a usual six-month duration, on proper notice given to the tenant. A Possession Order under the most common type, the assured shorthold tenancy (AST) is usually obtainable after eight weeks/two months of unpaid rent, and at the court's discretion after serving the tenant with a Section 8 notice (under the Housing Act 1988 as amended) for a lesser period for all assured tenancies, and on other grounds which defer to the landlord's ownership of the property. If the tenancy is an AST then any possession order will not take effect until six months has passed into the initial tenancy.

The Renters' Rights Act 2025, which comes into force on 1 May 2026, abolishes Section 21 'no-fault' evictions in England and converts all new assured shorthold tenancies to periodic assured tenancies. Landlords must instead rely on expanded Section 8 grounds, which require a specific reason for possession such as rent arrears, antisocial behaviour, or the landlord wishing to sell or move into the property.

A tenancy of someone who has been in occupation since before 15 January 1989 usually, if not a shorthold from the outset following their inception from 1980 onwards, may be a "regulated tenancy" with many more rights, especially under the Rent Act 1977 and Protection from Eviction Act 1977, introduced by the Third Wilson ministry.

Each house in multiple occupation, a unit the law does not regard it as a single household having more than three tenants, is subject to enhanced regulations including the Housing Act 2004. A council-issued licence to be a landlord of such a unit is always required in some local authorities (in others, limited to the larger statutory examples).

==== Residential leasehold ====
Tenancies lasting more than a couple of years are typically called leases and tend to be extensive; any lease exceeding seven years must be registered as a new leasehold estate. These arrangements follow fewer of the above rules and, in longer examples, are deliberately more similar to full ownership than conventional tenancies. They rarely require substantial ground rent.

Current law doesn't regulate significant break/resale charges or prevent leasehold house sales; following widespread consultation in the 2010s, certain reforms are being drafted. Generally, legislation allows lessees (tenants) to join together to gain the Right to Manage and the right to purchase the landlord's interest (collective enfranchisement). Individually, tenants can extend their leases for a new, smaller sum ("premium"), which typically won't be demanded or recommended every 15–35 years if the tenants have enfranchised. Notice requirements and forms tend to be strictly enforced.

In smaller properties, tenants may qualify for individual enfranchisement based on a simple mathematical division of the building. Statute law from 1925 implies into nearly all leases (tenancies at low rent with an initial large sum or "premium") that they can be sold (assigned) by the lessee; this reduces any restrictions to ones where the landlord may apply "reasonable" vetting standards without causing significant delays. This is commonly known as the "statutory qualified covenant on assignment/alienation."

In the diminishing area of social housing, tenants can exceptionally acquire the Right to Buy over time, which provides a fixed discount on the market price of the home.

==== Commercial (business) leases and tenancies ====
For commercial properties, much of the law regarding disputes and basic responsibilities stems from freedom of contract principles in the common law, including implied terms from precedent decisions in wide-ranging case law, such as the meaning of "good and substantial repair." Implied principles include "non-derogation from grant" and "quiet enjoyment."

All business tenants (lessees) must decide whether to contract in or outside of Part II of the Landlord and Tenant Act 1954, which provides "business security of tenure." If not specifically excluded, it generally applies by default. This "security of tenure" is expressly subject to common reasons and associated mechanisms for a landlord to reclaim the premises.

When a landlord sells a block where a qualifying tenant occupies more than 50%, the tenant should receive the right of first refusal to buy the block at the asking price. As in most jurisdictions, the law strictly enforces lease terms regarding unlawful subletting and assignment, potentially resulting in financial and property loss if violated.

Unlike residential tenancies, failure to pay a commercial rent demand can result in direct landlord repossession ("peaceable re-entry") through a commercial landlord's right to use "self-help" evictions. The practice of taking a tenant's goods without a court-issued warrant (flowing from a court order or outstanding tax demand) (distress) has been banned.

=== Mexico ===
In Mexico, landlord-tenant relationships are governed primarily by state-specific Civil Codes, resulting in variations in property regulations across the country. Mexican property laws tend to favor tenants, making evictions notably difficult for landlords upon lease expiration. If a landlord does not provide timely notice before the lease termination, the lease may automatically transition into an indefinite-term agreement, complicating eviction procedures further.

Security deposits in Mexico are generally negotiable between landlords and tenants without a legally mandated maximum, though it is common practice for landlords to request a deposit equivalent to one month's rent. Rent increases are regulated in certain jurisdictions, often restricted to no more than 85% of the increase in the general minimum wage for the region or based on a consumer price index agreed upon by both parties.

Eviction procedures in Mexico are strictly regulated, requiring judicial intervention that can involve significant time, effort, and legal expenses for landlords. If a tenant refuses to vacate following an eviction order, landlords may need judicial support, including police assistance, to enforce the eviction. The eviction process duration can vary significantly, often lasting several weeks or longer if tenants file appeals or request extensions.

== Criticism of landlords ==
=== Land ownership ===
The concept of land ownership is not universal. Many Native American tribes did not view land as a commodity whereas many Europeans colonists did. Ownership of land in the pre-colonial Americas varied from group to group, but many Native American societies had communal and individual land.

Some European scholars were also skeptical of land ownership, such as Adam Smith and Henry George. Smith said about landlords, "As soon as the land of any country has all become private property, the landlords—like all other men—love to reap where they never sowed, and demand a rent even for their land’s natural product." George believed land belonged to everyone and supported a public tax on economic rent, which he believed would be so profitable that all other taxes would be abolished.

=== Monopolies ===
Another common criticism of landlords is the tendency for monopolization. Without regulation, corporations are able to use their purchasing power to buy up housing stock. In a single Atlanta zip code, up to 90% of the houses sold between January 2011 and June 2012 were purchased by instituitional investors. Corporate landlords are able to buy foreclosed houses and rent the house back to the original owner. Another form of corporate monopolization and housing are company towns, where one corporation owns the vast majority of housing and businesses. Since these corporations employ most of the residents of the town, they are able to raise rent and lower wages during a recession.

=== Slum landlord ===
Renters (tenants or other licensees) at the lowest end of the payment scale may be in social or economic difficulty and suffer significant social stigma as a consequence. Due to lack of alternative options, such renters are often the victims of unscrupulous owners of unsafe and decrepit properties who neglect their responsibility to maintain the property.

The terms "slumlord", "slum landlord", or "ghetto landlord" is used to describe landlords of large numbers of such properties, often holding a virtual local monopoly. Public improvement or major private investment can improve such areas. In extreme situations, government compulsory purchase powers in many countries enable slum clearance to replace or renovate the worst of neighbourhoods.

Rent Gouging

Rent gouging refers to the practice of raising rent prices too high or to an unconscionable level. In response, some states and municipalities have passed legislation capping the amount landlords can increase the rent, also known as rent regulation.

== Accidental landlord ==
The term 'accidental landlord' is used for landlords who do not initially intend to become a landlord but have a spare property (from inheriting it, moving in with a partner, or unable to sell when moving), and then choose to lease the property instead of selling it.

== Rental investment and basis ==
Rental properties can be paid for by the tenant on whatever basis is agreed upon between the landlord and the tenant (more frequently than weekly or less than yearly is almost unheard of), which is always included in the lease agreement (preferably for both sides in writing). It should be one of the primary factors a tenant considers before moving in.

=== Incentives and conflicts ===
The incentive is to obtain a good rental yield (profit) and prospect of property price inflation. The landlord profit motive conflicts with the locally varying rights of tenants, maintenance and administrative duties of landlords, and keynote risks (tenant disputes, damage, neglect, loss of rent, insurance unavailability/disputes, economic slump, increased rate of interest on any mortgage, and negative equity or loss of investment). Net income (yield) and capital growth from letting (renting out) particularly in leveraged buy to let, is subject to idiosyncratic risk, which is considered objectively intensified for a highly leveraged investor limited to a small number of similar profile homes, of narrow rental market appeal in areas lacking economic resilience.

=== Security for rent and extra fees ===
Landlords or their agents commonly collect security deposits from tenants, and in some jurisdictions may also charge move-in or administration fees. The amount of the security deposit can significantly impact a tenant's decision to rent a property; a high deposit acts as a barrier to entry, while a lower deposit makes a property more attractive in competitive rental markets. Security deposits are rarely negotiated during pre-tenancy discussions. By law, security deposits are typically intended to cover unpaid rent, property damage, or cleaning/repair costs that result from the tenant's occupancy.

In certain jurisdictions, traditional security deposits or certain fees may be prohibited by law. Alternative approaches include landlords incorporating potential losses into the monthly rent or using regulated bond systems where a specified sum is held by an authorized third party (such as licensed real estate agents) rather than the landlord directly. By law, security deposits are typically intended to cover unpaid rent, property damage, or cleaning/repair costs that result from the tenant's occupancy.

== Licensed victualler ==
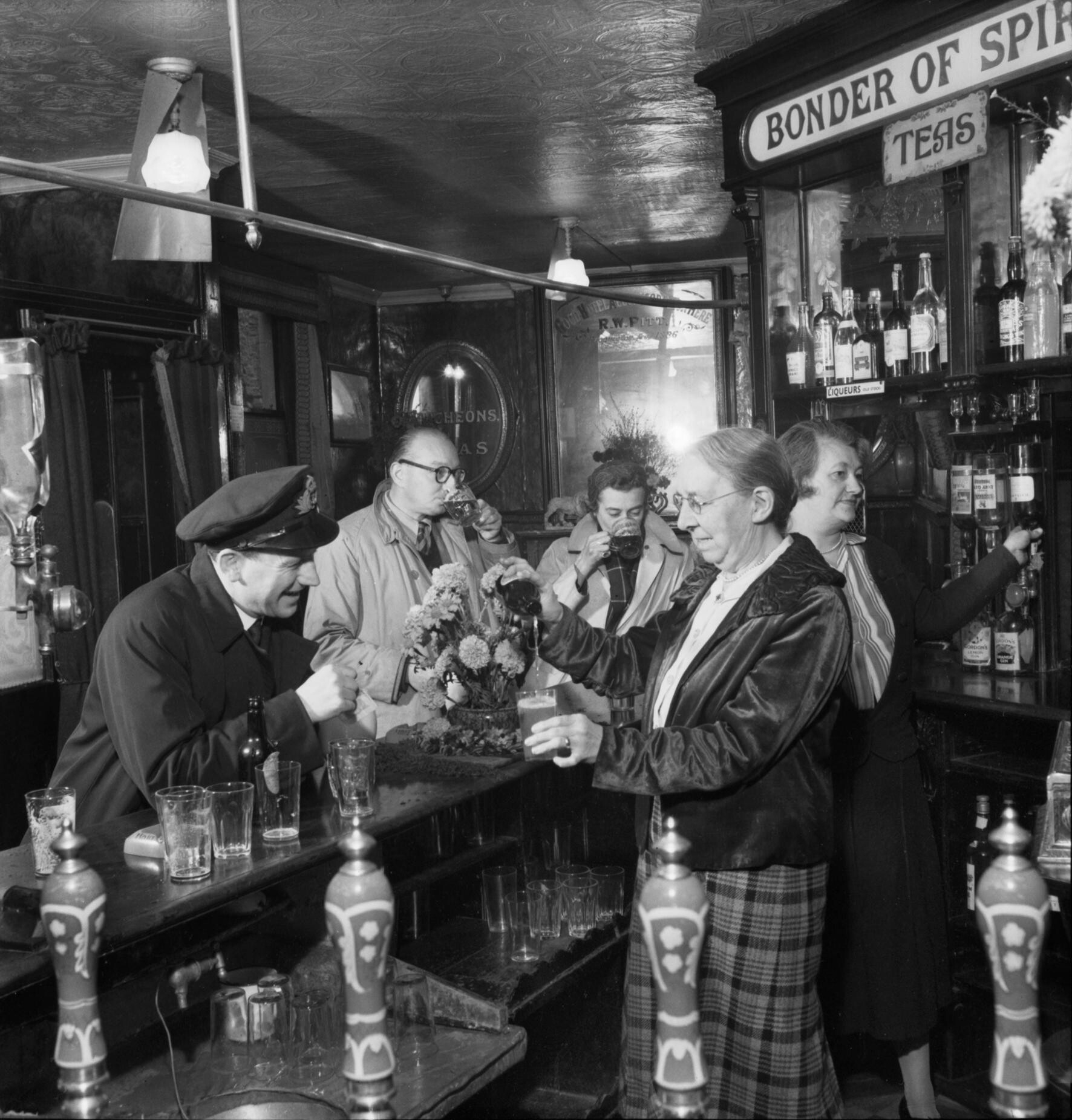
A landlady pouring a beer, Brighton, 1944

In the United Kingdom the owner and/or manager of a pub (public house) is usually called the "landlord/landlady" or "publican", the latter properly the appellation of a Roman public contractor or tax farmer. In more formal situations, the term used is licensed victualler or simply "licensee".

The Licensed Trade Charity, formed in 2004 from the merger of the Society of Licensed Victuallers and Licensed Victualler's National Homes, exists to serve the retirement needs of Britain's pub landlords. The charity also runs three private schools in Ascot and Reading in Berkshire and Sayers Common in Sussex. As well as having normal full fee paying students, Licensed Victuallers' School in Ascot provides discounted education prices for the children of landlords and others in the catering industry.

== Landlord associations ==
There are significant associations of landlords in various countries. These associations/societies provide support for their members in facing a range of issues by providing a means of mutual support, and also lobby relevant authorities and parliament with regard to the details and implementation of residential and some commercial tenancy legislation.

=== Australia ===
Numerous landlord associations exist in Australia. These associations should be distinguished from the class of property owner associations representing the 'big end of town' — the owners of major buildings and very large residential housing complexes, such as the Property Council of Australia.

- Property Owners Association of Australia (POAA)
- Property Owners Association of Victoria (POAVIC)
- POAQ – Property Owners Association of Queensland
- Property Owners Association of NSW
- Property Owners Association of Western Australia
- Landlords Association of South Australia

=== United Kingdom ===
National Residential Landlords Association (NRLA) has now formed from a merger of the two following organisations as of 31/3/2020:

- Residential Landlords Association (RLA)
- National Landlords Association (NLA)

== See also ==
- Parasitism
- Causes of income inequality in the United States
- Economic rent
- Films about landlords
- Owning class
- Rentier capitalism
- Rent-seeking
- Rent strike
- Slumlord
- Social parasitism (offense)
- Tenement (law)
- Usury

=== Related occupations ===
- Building superintendent
- Landowner
- Property manager
- Property Management
