= Rent regulation in England and Wales =

Rent regulation in England and Wales is the part of English land law that creates rights and obligations for tenants and landlords.

The main areas of regulation concern:

- the mechanisms for regulating prices (historically called "rent control"). Since the Housing Act 1980 (c. 51), prices are generally left for landlords to fix except in the "affordable" sector where councils and housing associations manage around 4.4 million homes which are subject to rent regulation.
- the reasons that a person can be evicted. Since the Housing Act 1996 (c. 52), most tenancies can be terminated on their expiry for any reason.
- the obligations to repair and maintain the property, under the Landlord and Tenant Act 1985 (c. 70).

In general, people renting homes or real property may agree with a landlord to any contract terms they like, but some rights and duties are made compulsory. Historically, the United Kingdom sought to ensure fair rents, prevent evictions without a fair reason, and placed obligations on landlords to properly maintain premises. Such regulation seeks to redress the inequality of bargaining power between landlords and tenants in a market where there is unlimited freedom of contract. Most rights for tenants were abolished by the Housing Act 1980 (c. 51) and in subsequent legislation through the 1980s. The remaining legislation is found in the Landlord and Tenant Act 1954 (2 & 3 Eliz. 2. c. 56), which gives rights to business tenants, and the Landlord and Tenant Act 1985 (c. 70) which gives some rights, although fewer, to people renting for the purpose of a home.

== History ==
"As soon as the land of any country has all become private property, the landlords, like all other men, love to reap where they never sowed, and demand a rent even for its natural produce. The wood of the forest, the grass of the field, and all the natural fruits of the earth, which, when land was in common, cost the labourer only the trouble of gathering them, come, even to him, to have an additional price fixed upon them. He must then pay for the licence to gather them; and must give up to the landlord a portion of what his labour either collects or produces. This portion, or, what comes to the same thing, the price of this portion, constitutes the rent of land ...."

— Adam Smith, The Wealth of Nations (1776) Book I, ch 6

Before the 20th century, and during the industrial revolution, the regulation of the rental property relationship was largely left to the market. The first major regulation was introduced by the Rents and Mortgage Interest Restriction Act 1915 (5 & 6 Geo. 5. c. 97), largely as a consequence of rent strikes in Glasgow.

== Regulation ==
=== Tenancy contract ===
- Marchant v Charters [1977] 1 WLR 1181, Lord Denning MR, a person has a lease when the occupant had a ‘stake in the room or did he have only permission for himself personally to occupy’ it?
- Johnson v Moreton [1980] AC 37, 66, Lord Simon, ‘There was one economic and social relationship where it was claimed that there were palpably lacking the prerequisites for the beneficent operation of laisser-faire – that of landlord and tenant. The market was limited and sluggish: the supply of land could not expand immediately and flexibly in response to demand, and even humble dwellings took more time to erect than those in want of them could spare. Generally, a man became a tenant rather than an owner-occupier because his circumstances compelled him to live hand-to-mouth; the landlord’s purse was generally longer and his command of knowledge and counsel far greater than the tenant’s. In short, it was held, the constriction of the market and the inequality of bargaining power enabled the landlord to dictate contractual terms which did not necessarily operate to the general benefit of society. It was to counteract this descried constriction of the market and to redress this descried inequality of bargaining power that the law – specifically, in the shape of legislation – came to intervene repeatedly to modify freedom of contract between landlord and tenant.’
- Bankway Properties Ltd v Pensfold-Dunsford [2001] 1 WLR 1369, Arden LJ, [42]-[44]

=== Right to repairs ===
- Bruton v London & Quadrant Housing Trust [1999] UKHL 26
- Landlord and Tenant Act 1985 (c. 70)

=== Security of tenure ===
Security of tenure exists for business tenancies under the Landlord and Tenant Act 1954 (2 & 3 Eliz. 2. c. 56). It was abolished for most residential properties by the Housing Act 1988 (c. 50). However, it remains for some people who live in council houses.

- Protection from Eviction Act 1977 (c. 43)
- Assured tenancy
- Assured shorthold tenancy

=== Rental price controls ===
The Rent Act 1977 (c. 42) was the last piece of legislation in England and Wales to place limits on how much landlords could raise prices for residential homes. It was substantially repealed by the Housing Act 1988 (c. 50).

=== Regulators and ombudsmen ===
- The Property Ombudsman

== See also ==
- English land law
- Rent regulation
- Vernon v Bethell (1762) 28 ER 838
- Rent-seeking
- Land tenure in England
