= Section 21 notice =

Legal term in England and Wales

In England and Wales, a section 21 notice, also known as a section 21 notice of possession or a section 21 eviction, was a notice under section 21 of the Housing Act 1988, that a landlord had to give to their tenant to begin the process to take possession of a property let on an assured shorthold tenancy without providing a reason for wishing to take possession. The expiry of a section 21 notice did not bring a tenancy to its end. The tenancy would only be ended by a landlord obtaining an order for possession from a court, and then having that order executed (Note: 1988 c. 50 s. 5(1)(a)) by a County Court bailiff or High Court enforcement officer. The Renters' Rights Act 2025 abolished section 21 notices when it came into force on 1 May 2026.

Such an order for possession could not be made to take effect earlier than six months from the beginning of the first tenancy unless the tenancy was a demoted assured shorthold tenancy. (Note: 1988 c. 50 s. 21(5) & (5A)) If the court was satisfied that a landlord is entitled to possession, it would have had to make an order for possession, for a date no later than 14 days after the making of the order unless exceptional hardship would be caused to the tenant in which case possession may be postponed to a date no later than six weeks after the making of the order. (Note: 1980 c. 51 s. 89) (Note: 1988 c. 50 s. 9(6)) The court had no power to grant any adjournment or stay of execution from enforcement unless the tenant had a disability discrimination, public law or human rights defence, or the case was pending an appeal. (Note: [2008] EWHC 1688 (QB))

Where a landlord was seeking possession on the basis of a section 21 notice where the tenancy was, or where there were successive tenancies on the same terms as, the original tenancy comprised in a written tenancy agreement, the landlord could bring a claim for possession under the accelerated procedure if no other claims were being made at the same time. Unlike a standard possession claim, the accelerated possession version was decided by a judge on paper without a hearing unless the paperwork did not appear to be in order, or the tenant raised an important issue in defence. The mean time between claim for possession under the accelerated procedure being issued at court and eviction in 2019 was 27.4 weeks, with a median of 18.7 weeks.

Ministry of Justice statistics for July to September 2025 showed landlord possession claims fell 8% year-on-year to 23,327, while repossessions by county court bailiffs rose 9% to 7,641. The median time from claim to repossession increased to 27.4 weeks, up from 24.4 weeks in the same period of 2024. London accounted for 33% of all landlord claims and orders. Ministry of Justice data from early 2026 showed significant regional variation in possession claim wait times. Courts in London and Birmingham averaged 16 weeks from claim to hearing, while courts in areas such as Blackpool averaged 6 weeks.

Before its abolition, Section 21 evictions were the recorded cause for people being at risk of homelessness in 26,660 cases, and the risk of a Section 21 notice was listed as a cause of housing instability by the Centre for Homelessness Impact report Tackling Tenancy Insecurity in the Private Rented Sector.

== Background ==
Security of tenure was first given to tenants of certain dwellings in 1915 by the Increase of Rent and Mortgage Interest (War Restrictions) Act 1915 as a result of housing shortage caused by World War I. Regulations on security were variously widened and tightened over the years. The Rent Act 1977 and the Protection from Eviction Act 1977 consolidated existing legislations and is still in force as of 2019. Tenants of regulated tenancies under the Rent Act 1977 cannot be evicted by their landlord without one of the grounds under Schedule 15 of the Act being satisfied. Notably, grounds for possession resulting from tenant's rent arrears is only a discretionary ground, meaning the court will only grant an order for possession if it considers it reasonable to do so. (Note: 1977 c. 42 s. 98(1))

The Housing Act 1988 introduced assured tenancies and assured shorthold tenancies from 15 January 1989, the latter being a subset of the former. Like regulated tenancies under the Rent Act 1977, tenants of non-shorthold assured tenancies cannot be evicted without one of the grounds specified under the Act being satisfied, though there is now a mandatory ground for possession for rent arrears. Landlords of tenants with an assured shorthold tenancies however can apply for an order for possession from the court without specifying any reason so long as sufficient notices have been given to their tenants in accordance with section 21 of the 1988 Act. Assured shorthold became the default type of private residential tenancies from the commencement of section 96 of the Housing Act 1996 on 28 February 1997. (Note: 1996 c. 52 s. 96)

== Requirements ==
Section 21 of the 1988 Act provided two different mechanisms under which a landlord can give notice to obtain possession of their property. In either case, since the coming into force of the 1996 Act, the notice had to be in writing. (Note: 1996 c. 52 s. 98) An agent of the landlord could give the notice on behalf of the landlord. Where there are joint landlords, the notice may be given by any one of them. Where the occupier tenant holds a sub-tenancy, a superior landlord could not give a valid notice at a time when they are not the direct landlord of the occupier even if the mesne tenancy will have ended by the time the notice expire thus making the sub-tenant a direct tenant of the superior landlord. (Note: [2018] EWCA Civ 2414) If the notice was served by a company, then it had to be signed or otherwise executed in accordance with the Companies Act 2006.

=== Subsection (1)(b) ===
Under subsection (1)(b), the tenant had to be given at least two months' notice that the landlord requires possession of the property. Where the tenancy agreement contained a break clause which allows for the tenancy to be determined before the expiry of the fixed term period, a notice under section 21(1)(b) may be sufficient to determine the tenancy under the break clause. (Note: CA 15 July 1996) The legislation did not specify whether the notice may expire before the end of the fixed term in the absence of a break clause, and no clear precedent was established on the topic.

Until the Court of Appeal judgment in Spencer v Taylor, (Note: [2013] EWCA Civ 1600) it was generally thought that a notice could only be given under subsection (1)(b) during a fixed term tenancy. The judgment clarified that a notice may also be given under the subsection during a statutory periodic tenancy that arise pursuant to section 5 of the 1988 Act on the coming to an end of a fixed term tenancy. (Note: EWCA Civ 1600 (2013) ¶ 20)

==== Private registered provider of social housing ====
If the landlord was a private registered provider of social housing, and the tenancy was for a fixed term of at least two years granted on or after 1 April 2012, (Note: 2011 c. 20 s. 164(2)) (Note: 2012 No. 628 (C. 14) art. 6) then the landlord must have previously given a notice of at least six months that the landlord does not propose to grant the tenant another tenancy on the expiry of the current tenancy, and informing the tenant of how to obtain help or advice about the notice and outlining any obligations the landlord has to provide help or advice. (Note: 1988 c. 50 s. 21(1A) & (1B))

=== Subsection (4)(a) ===
Under subsection (4)(a), the length of the notice had to be at least two months. The notice had to state that possession of the property is required by virtue of section 21 of the 1988 Act, on a date after which possession is required. The date must be the last day of a period of the tenancy, and cannot be earlier than the earliest day an equivalent common law tenancy may be bought to an end by a notice to quit given on the same date.

A notice stating that possession is required on a specific date rather than after the specified date was invalid. (Note: EWCA Civ 407 (2006) ¶ 7) The notice did not have to state an actual calendar date. It was sufficient for the notice to be worded with a formula which enables the tenant to work out when the notice expires. (Note: CA 28 HLR 877 (1996)) Such a formula could be on its own, or used alongside a specific date as a saving formula in case the specific date is not valid. In the latter case, the notice is valid even if the notice give two different dates so long as one of the date is specified as a fall back in case the other date is invalid. (Note: EWCA Civ 1600 (2013) ¶ 24)

=== COVID-19 ===
As a result of the COVID-19 pandemic, the minimum length of notice was temporarily raised from two to three months under section 81 of the Coronavirus Act 2020 for all notices served between 26 March 2020 initially to 30 September 2020. Following a decision by the Master of the Rolls with agreement of the Lord Chancellor, additional restriction came in on 27 March 2020 suspending all new and ongoing housing possession action nationally for 90 days.

On 5 June 2020, Secretary of State for Housing, Communities and Local Government Robert Jenrick announced via Twitter that suspension of eviction was to be extended for a further two months. The announced extension was given effect through the Civil Procedure (Amendment No. 2) (Coronavirus) Rules 2020 which continued all new and existing stays until 23 August 2020. Following the direction of the Lord Chancellor on 20 August 2020, the suspension was further extended another four weeks to 20 September 2020.

The Welsh Government further increased the minimum length of notice for properties in Wales to six months from 24 July 2020. On 28 August 2020, the Coronavirus Act 2020 (Residential Tenancies: Protection from Eviction) (Amendment) (England) Regulations 2020 was laid before parliament raising the minimum length of notice in England also to six months. This change went into effect the following day, to end 31 March 2021. The end date of the temporary extension in Wales was later extended to 31 March 2021 to match.

== Property licensing ==
No section 21 notice could be given if the landlord is required to obtain a licence, whether under a mandatory or additional licensing scheme for a house in multiple occupation or a selective licensing scheme for a designated area, while the property is unlicensed and an application for a licence is not pending. (Note: 2004 c. 34 s. 75 & 98)

== Tenancy deposit ==
The Housing Act 2004 introduced requirements on how a landlord must deal with any tenancy deposit taken in relation to the tenancy. A landlord may only require the payment of money as deposit. (Note: 2004 c. 34 s. 213(7)) No section 21 notice may be given while any property other than money is being held as deposit. (Note: 2004 c. 34 s. 215(3))

No section 21 notice could be given while a deposit is held that is not protected in accordance with an authorised tenancy deposit scheme. (Note: 2004 c. 34 s. 215(1)) For a deposit that was taken between 6 April 2007 and 5 April 2012, the deposit was required to be protected within 14 days beginning with the date on which it was received. The Localism Act 2011 increased the time limit to 30 days (Note: 2011 c. 20 s. 184(2)) starting from 6 April 2012. (Note: 2012 No. 628 (C. 14) art. 8) Additionally, the Localism Act 2011 (Commencement No. 4 and Transitional, Transitory and Saving Provisions) Order 2012 provided for a 30 days amnesty period for existing deposit to be protected if a landlord was not already in compliance. (Note: 2012 No. 628 (C. 14) art. 16)

As well as protecting the deposit, the landlord had to also give information as prescribed by the Housing (Tenancy Deposits) (Prescribed Information) Order 2007 to the tenant and anyone who paid the deposit on behalf of the tenant before a section 21 notice may be given. This information must be given by the landlord. It was not enough for the landlord to show that a tenant are able to obtain the information by their own enquiries. (Note: EWCA Civ 1789 (2012) ¶ 39)

For a deposit that was received from 6 April 2007, if the deposit was not protected in accordance with an authorised scheme by the required time limit, then the landlord had to first return the deposit in full to the tenant or with such deductions as are agreed between them before the landlord may give a section 21 notice. Alternatively, a section 21 notice may be given if the tenant or the person who paid the deposit on behalf of the tenant has made an application to the county court against the landlord for a penalty under section 214(1) of the 2004 Act, and the claim has been determined by the court, withdrawn or settled. (Note: 2004 c. 34 s. 215(2A))

The requirements to protect the deposit and giving of information applied afresh for every tenancy. Where there are successive tenancies between the same landlord and tenant, the deposit was deemed to have been returned by the landlord to the tenant at the end of the old tenancy and the tenant immediately paying the deposit to the landlord for the new tenancy. (Note: EWCA Civ 669 (2013) ¶ 36) From 26 March 2015, if the successive tenancies were for the same or substantially the same property, a landlord was deemed to have complied with the requirements if at the start of a new tenancy the deposit continued to be held in accordance with the same authorised scheme as when the requirements were last complied with by the landlord. (Note: 2004 c. 34 s. 215B)

== England ==
=== Deregulation Act 2015 ===
The Deregulation Act 2015 introduced a number of changes imposing new obligations on landlords, failure to comply with which renders any section 21 notices served to be invalid. On commencement, these changes applied to all tenancies which began from 1 October 2015, other than statutory periodic tenancies that came into being pursuant to section 5 of the 1988 Act on or after that date on the coming to an end of a tenancy that was granted before that date. All the changes apart from the requirement for landlords to provide prescribed information applied to all tenancies from 1 October 2018. (Note: 2015 c. 20 s. 41) (Note: 2015 No. 994 (C. 69) art. 11)

==== Retaliatory eviction ====
A landlord was prohibited from giving a section 21 notice for six months if they are given an improvement notices under section 11 or 12 of the 2004 Act relating to hazards by the local housing authority, or a notice under section 40(7) of the 2004 Act after taking emergency remedial action. (Note: 2015 c. 20 s. 33(1))

Where a section 21 notice had already been given, and before the notice was given, the tenant made a complaint in writing to the landlord regarding the condition of the property and the landlord did not provide an adequate response or gave the notice following the complaint, the tenant then made a complaint to the local housing authority about the same or substantially the same subject as the original complaint to the landlord, and the authority then served an improvement or emergency remedial action notice on the landlord in response, the section 21 was rendered invalid. (Note: 2015 c. 20 s. 33(2))

A landlord was exempted from this section if the condition that gave rise to the notice by the authority was due to a failure by the tenant to use the property in a tenant-like manner, or at the time of the notice the property was genuinely on the market for sale, or if the landlord was a private registered provider of social housing, or the section 21 notice was given as a result of a mortgagee exercising a power of sale on the mortgagor after a default. (Note: 2015 c. 20 s. 34)

==== Time limits ====
The requirement for a notice under subsection 4(a) to expire on the last day of a period of the tenancy was removed. (Note: 2015 c. 20 s. 35)

No section 21 notice could be given by a landlord in the first four months of a tenancy. Where there were successive tenancies between the same landlord and tenant for the same or substantially the same property, this prohibition ran from when the original tenancy began. The prohibition did not apply to a statutory periodic tenancy. (Note: 2015 c. 20 s. 36)

A section 21 notice would have only been valid for six months from the notice being given. An exception was where a notice has been given under subsection (4)(a), and the length of the notice was required to be longer than two months under subsection (4)(b), in which case proceedings for an order for possession may not have been begun after four months from when the notice expired. (Note: 2015 c. 20 s. 36) Between 29 August 2020 and 31 March 2021, where the minimum notice period was increased to six months due to the COVID-19 pandemic, the period where the notice remains valid was increased to ten months from the notice being given. (Note: 2020 No. 914 reg. 3(7)(b))

==== Prescribed form ====
The Secretary of State could prescribe the form which Section 21 notices must be given. (Note: 2015 c. 20 s. 37) The required form was prescribed as Form 6A as originally laid out in the Assured Shorthold Tenancy Notices and Prescribed Requirements (England) (Amendment) Regulations 2015. This form replaced the form originally prescribed under the Assured Shorthold Tenancy Notices and Prescribed Requirements (England) Regulations 2015 before it came into effect, as a result of the original containing a significant error regarding how long a notice is valid for.

There was disagreement as to whether the prescribed form was required for tenancies granted before 1 October 2015 and associated statutory periodic tenancies. (Note: 2015 No. 1646 reg. 1) If the requirement applied to the older tenancies, then it came into effect on 1 July 2018. (Note: 2015 No. 994 (C. 69) art. 10) An updated Form 6A was prescribed on 1 June 2019 to coincide with the commencement of the Tenant Fees Act 2019. (Note: 2019 No. 915 reg. 2) Without the restriction to its application that was present in the first 2015 Regulations, (Note: 2019 No. 915 reg. 1) there are no questions as to its applicability to existing older tenancies.

A modified Form 6A was published on the government's website on 26 March 2020 to reflect the longer notice period required under the Coronavirus Act. Since the modified form was not set by either primary or secondary legislation, but simply modified and published on the government's website, it is debatable whether the form as available on the government's website is valid or not, without relying on arguments that the form as published is substantially to the same effect (Note: 2015 No. 620 reg. 2) as that prescribed following authorities from Ravenseft Properties Ltd v Hall. (Note: [2001] EWCA Civ 2034)

==== Prescribed legal requirements ====
No section 21 notice could be given by a landlord while the landlord is in breach of a prescribed requirement relating to the condition of the property, health and safety of the occupiers, and the energy performance of the property. (Note: 2015 c. 20 s. 38) Two requirements were prescribed under this section (Note: 2015 No. 1646 reg. 2) for tenancies which began from 1 October 2015, other than statutory periodic tenancies that were excluded.

The first was the requirement under regulation 6(5) of the Energy Performance of Buildings (England and Wales) Regulations 2012 whereby a landlord has to provide an energy performance certificate to the person who ultimately becomes the tenant. (Note: 2012 No. 3118 reg. 6(5))

Government guidelines published by the Department for Communities and Local Government (as it then was) in December 2017 suggested that an energy performance certificate was not required to be given where the tenancy is for an individual room as the tenancy would not be for a building or a building unit designed or altered for separate use. It was unclear if lack of an energy performance certificate in such a tenancy would invalidate a section 21 notice.

The second was the requirements under regulation 36 of the Gas Safety (Installation and Use) Regulations 1998. These require a landlord of any property with any relevant gas fitting or flue serving such fitting to give a copy of the most recent gas safety certificate to new tenant before they occupy the property, (Note: 1998 No. 2451 reg. 36(6)(b)) and for a copy of new gas safety certificate to be given to each existing tenant. (Note: 2015 No. 1646 reg. 2(2)) (Note: 1998 No. 2451 reg. 36(6)(a)) Where the tenant's right to occupy the property is for a period of at most 28 days or there is no relevant gas appliance in any room occupied by the tenant, the landlord may choose instead to display the certificate in a prominent position in the property alongside a statement that the tenant is entitled to request their own copy of the certificate. (Note: 1998 No. 2451 reg. 36(7))

The Court of Appeal in Trecarrel House Limited v Rouncefield (Note: [2020] EWCA Civ 760) overturned lower court's judgments that a breach of the requirement to give or display the most recent gas safety certificate to new tenant before their occupation cannot be rectified. Arguments similar to that from Kaur v Griffith (Note: County Court at Bromley 25 July 2019) that even if the gas safety certificate was provided, a valid section 21 notice could not be given if the most recent associated gas safety check was conducted too long after the previous check was also rejected. The facts of the case and wording of the judgments however leaves open the possibility that a lack of a valid gas safety certificate at the time when the tenant first went into occupation under the tenancy remains an irremediable breach. The solicitor instructed by the tenant in Trecarrel House Limited v Rouncefield confirmed on Twitter that the tenant was seeking leave to appeal to the Supreme Court.

==== Prescribed information ====
A landlord, other than a private registered provider of social housing, is required to give to the tenant the "How to rent: the checklist for renting in England" guide published by the Department for Communities and Local Government. The version given must be the version that has effect for the time being. The guide must be given in hard copy unless the tenant has agreed that the landlord may give the tenant notices and other documents given under or in connection with the tenancy by email, (Note: 2015 No. 1646 reg. 3) in which case it can be sent as an email attachment. Where the tenancy is a replacement tenancy, it is not necessary for the landlord to give the guide again unless a new version has been published since the last time the landlord provided the guide under an earlier tenancy. There is no requirement for the landlord to provide further copies of the guide during a tenancy when new versions are published.

There is no case law as to whether the version provided must be the version current at the time the tenancy started, or at the time it is given.

On 26 June 2018, the Ministry of Housing, Communities and Local Government published a new version of the guide with the title "How to... Rent A guide for current and prospective tenants in the private rented sector in England". With its different subtitle to that prescribed under the 2015 regulations, it is unclear if this version has any legal effect. A new version of the guide with corrected subtitle was published on 9 July 2018. Similarly, with the 2015 regulations specific reference to the Department for Communities and Local Government, it is unclear if any of the guides published by the Ministry of Housing, Communities and Local Government since its renaming in January 2018 has any validity.

==== Repayment of prepaid rent ====
Where the tenancy was bought to an end before the end of a period of the tenancy as a result of the service of a section 21 notice, and the tenant had paid rent in advance for that period, the tenant was entitled to a repayment of rent paid for days where they were not in occupation. (Note: 2015 c. 20 s. 40)

=== Tenant Fees Act 2019 ===
The Tenant Fees Act 2019 introduced a ban on landlords and letting agents charging tenants, someone acting on behalf of the tenant, or the tenant's guarantor most kind of fees in connection with their tenancy, a cap on the amount allowed for a tenancy deposit, and rules on the treating of holding deposit. It came into force for new tenancies on 1 June 2019, (Note: 2019 No. 857 (C. 20) reg. 3) and existing tenancies a year later. (Note: 2019 c. 4 s. 30)

If the landlord has required and accepted a prohibited payment from a relevant person, or fails to handle a holding deposit in accordance with the legislation, then no section 21 notice could be given by the landlord until the prohibited payment or holding deposit have been repaid to the person who made the payment. Alternatively, the landlord had to first obtain the consent of the relevant person to apply any prohibited payment or holding deposit which had not been repaid towards the payment of rent or tenancy deposit. (Note: 2019 c. 4 s. 17)

== Wales ==
=== Rent Smart Wales ===
The Housing (Wales) Act 2014 introduced mandatory registration for all landlords and their properties. From 23 November 2016, if the landlord is not registered or a self-managing landlord is not licensed, no section 21 notice may be given.

== See also ==
- Section 8 notice – the alternative procedure, by which one or more of its specific grounds for possession are relied on.

== Notes and references ==
=== Case citations ===
- Citation format: year of decision; abbreviated title of the court/reporter; the decision or page number

=== Bibliography ===
General

- UK Parliament. Increase of Rent and Mortgage Interest (War Restrictions) Act 1915.
- "Rent Act 1977", legislation.gov.uk, The National Archives, 1977 c. 42
- "Protection from Eviction Act 1977", legislation.gov.uk, The National Archives, 1977 c. 43
- "Housing Act 1980", legislation.gov.uk, The National Archives, 1980 c. 51
- "Housing Act 1988", legislation.gov.uk, The National Archives, 1988 c. 50
- "Housing Act 1996", legislation.gov.uk, The National Archives, 1996 c. 52
- "The Gas Safety (Installation and Use) Regulations 1998", legislation.gov.uk, The National Archives, SI 1998/2451
- "Housing Act 2004", legislation.gov.uk, The National Archives, 2004 c. 34
- "Companies Act 2006", legislation.gov.uk, The National Archives, 2006 c. 46
- "The Housing (Tenancy Deposits) (Prescribed Information) Order 2007", legislation.gov.uk, The National Archives, SI 2007/797
- "Localism Act 2011", legislation.gov.uk, The National Archives, 2011 c. 20
- "The Localism Act 2011 (Commencement No. 4 and Transitional, Transitory and Saving Provisions) Order 2012", legislation.gov.uk, The National Archives, SI 2012/628
- "The Energy Performance of Buildings (England and Wales) Regulations 2012", legislation.gov.uk, The National Archives, SI 2012/3118
- Senedd Cymru – Welsh Parliament. Housing (Wales) Act 2014 as amended (see also enacted form), from legislation.gov.uk.
- "Deregulation Act 2015", legislation.gov.uk, The National Archives, 2015 c. 20
- "The Assured Tenancies and Agricultural Occupancies (Forms) (England) Regulations 2015", legislation.gov.uk, The National Archives, SI 2015/620
- "The Deregulation Act 2015 (Commencement No. 1 and Transitional and Saving Provisions) Order 2015", legislation.gov.uk, The National Archives, SI 2015/994
- "The Assured Shorthold Tenancy Notices and Prescribed Requirements (England) Regulations 2015", legislation.gov.uk, The National Archives, SI 2015/1646
- "The Assured Shorthold Tenancy Notices and Prescribed Requirements (England) (Amendment) Regulations 2015", legislation.gov.uk, The National Archives, SI 2015/1725
- "Tenant Fees Act 2019", legislation.gov.uk, The National Archives, 2019 c. 4
- "The Tenant Fees Act 2019 (Commencement No. 3) Regulations 2019", legislation.gov.uk, The National Archives, SI 2019/857
- "The Assured Tenancies and Agricultural Occupancies (Forms) (England) (Amendment) Regulations 2019", legislation.gov.uk, The National Archives, SI 2019/915
- "Coronavirus Act 2020", legislation.gov.uk, The National Archives, 2020 c. 7
- "The Civil Procedure (Amendment No. 2) (Coronavirus) Rules 2020", legislation.gov.uk, The National Archives, SI 2020/582
- Senedd Cymru – Welsh Parliament. The Coronavirus Act 2020 (Assured Tenancies and Assured Shorthold Tenancies, Extension of Notice Periods) (Amendment) (Wales) Regulations 2020 as made, from legislation.gov.uk.
- "The Civil Procedure (Amendment No. 5) (Coronavirus) Rules 2020", legislation.gov.uk, The National Archives, SI 2020/889
- "The Coronavirus Act 2020 (Residential Tenancies: Protection from Eviction) (Amendment) (England) Regulations 2020", legislation.gov.uk, The National Archives, SI 2020/914
- "The Assured Tenancies and Agricultural Occupancies (Forms) (England) (Amendment) and Suspension (Coronavirus) Regulations 2020", legislation.gov.uk, The National Archives, SI 2020/924
- Senedd Cymru – Welsh Parliament. The Coronavirus Act 2020 (Residential Tenancies: Protection from Eviction) (Wales) Regulations 2020 as made, from legislation.gov.uk.
- Fawaz v Aylward & Another, CA 15 July 1996, Court of Appeal
- Lower Street Properties Ltd v Jones [1996] 28 HLR 877, Court of Appeal
- Ravenseft Properties Ltd v Hall [2001] EWCA Civ 2034 (19 December 2001), Court of Appeal
- Notting Hill Housing Trust v Roomus [2006] EWCA Civ 407 (29 March 2006), Court of Appeal
- Admiral Taverns (Cygnet) Ltd v Daniel & Anor. [2008] EWHC 1688 (QB) (21 July 2008), High Court of Justice (Queen's Bench Division)
- Ayannuga v Swindells [2012] EWCA Civ 1789 (6 November 2012), Court of Appeal
- Superstrike Ltd v Rodrigues [2013] EWCA Civ 669 (14 June 2013), Court of Appeal
- Spencer v Taylor [2013] EWCA Civ 1600 (20 November 2013), Court of Appeal
- Barrow & Another v Kazim & Others [2018] EWCA Civ 2414 (31 October 2018), Court of Appeal
- Trecarrell House Ltd v Rouncefield [2020] EWCA Civ 760 (18 June 2020), Court of Appeal

Specific
