= Demoted tenancy =

English law

A demoted tenancy is, in English law, a type of tenancy created by a court when a housing association get a demotion order from a court. It is typically created when an assured tenant or secure tenant engages in anti-social behaviour. The creation of the demoted tenancy is an alternative to eviction and makes a tenant easier to evict in the future. The Housing Act 1985 established demoted tenancy, and the Housing Act 1996 expanded on it.

In 2024, the UK government introduced legislation to abolish demoted tenancies, but it did not pass into law due to the early general election.

== Demotion order ==
A social landlord can apply to their county court for a demotion order. This is often done when tenants or their visitors engage in repeated anti-social behavior, break terms of the tenancy agreement, or use premises for unlawful purposes.

Demotion orders expire after twelve months.

The landlord must provide assured tenants at least two weeks notice, and must provide secure tenants at least four weeks notice on a special form; however, the court can waive notice requirements when it is 'just and equitable' to do so.

== Effects ==
Demoted tenants lose their rights as assured or secure tenants, and have the same rights as assured shorthold tenants. Demoted tenants lose the Right to Buy and time spent as a demoted tenant does not count towards the three year qualifying period for the right to buy.

Possession orders are more likely to be granted while demoted tenancy is present, making eviction much easier for landlords.

If demoted tenants follow the terms of the tenancy agreement, they are automatically given assured tenancy after the twelve months.
