= Succession rights in the United Kingdom (housing law) =

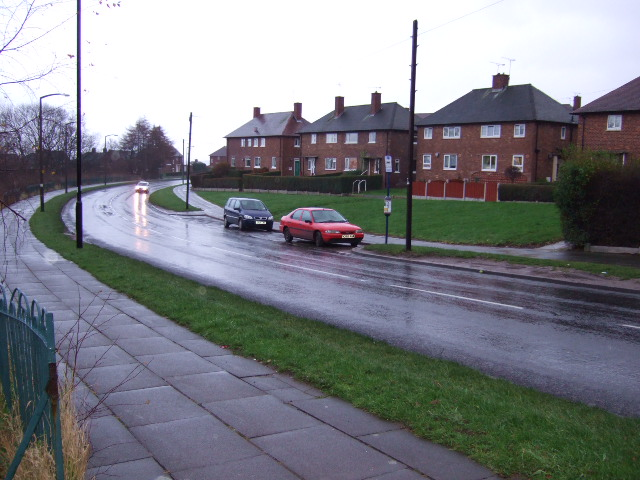
Succession rights concern the ability of tenants to pass on a tenancy when they die

Succession rights in the United Kingdom is an area of housing law concerning the ability to pass on their tenancy when they die something known as a succession.

== Council properties ==
A council house can only have one succession unless a tenancy document grants more. If an inherited council house is too large for an individual's needs, then a tenant can also be evicted for under-occupation, although the council would have to provide suitable alternative accommodation. The right of succession was granted by the Housing Act 1985. The Localism Act 2011 amended the succession rights of tenancies created after this date and limits them to the spouse or partner of the deceased.

== Housing association properties ==
Whether or not a housing association tenant has a right to succession depends upon the type of tenancy they hold, be it an assured tenancy, an assured shorthold tenancy or a secure tenancy.

== Housing and Planning Bill ==
The Housing and Planning Bill proposes that secure council tenancies will be replaced by tenancies lasting between two and five years. Under the proposals family members will not inherit a lifetime tenancy.

== See also ==
- Under-occupation penalty
- Assignment (housing law)
