= Short assured tenancy =

Type of tenancy in Scotland

A short assured tenancy is a type of tenancy in Scotland that was introduced by the Housing (Scotland) Act 1988. A short assured tenancy gives landlords some protection and freedom of action when letting their properties. Short assured tenancies have become the norm within the residential letting industry in Scotland. The equivalent legislation in England and Wales is assured shorthold tenancy. Following the enactment of the Private Housing (Tenancies) (Scotland) Act 2016, it is no longer possible to create a short assured tenancy, instead a private residential tenancy must be entered into; with greater protections for the tenant such as security of tenure.

== Minimum criteria ==
For a tenancy to be considered a short assured tenancy, the premises must be a separate dwelling and the tenant must occupy it as their main home. A prescribed notice (form AT5) has to be served prior to the start of the tenancy, confirming that the tenancy will be a 'short assured tenancy' and not an 'assured tenancy'. The duration of the tenancy must be at least six months and it must not be included in one of the following categories:

- Company lets
- Holiday lets
- Lettings where the landlord resides at the premises
- Very low rent tenancies (less than £6 per week)
- Agricultural tenancies
- Tenancies covered by the Rent (Scotland) Act 1984.

== Main characteristics of a short assured tenancy ==
For a short assured tenancy a formal notice (AT5) must be served prior to the start of the tenancy and the tenant is only given limited security of tenure. The landlord can seek possession of the premises on a number of grounds established in the Housing (Scotland) Act 1988, and once the agreement reached its end (the 'ish' date). The minimum length of the initial SaT tenancy is six months. If the initial term is less than six months or an AT5 is not served prior to the tenancy then regardless of the paperwork it will actually be an Assured Tenancy..
