= Warren v Keen =

English landlord-tenant case

- Court: Court of Appeal
- Decided: 9 October 1953
- Citations: [1953] EWCA Civ 1, [1954] 1 QB 15, [1953] 3 WLR 702, [1954] QB 15, [1953] 2 All ER 1118

Case opinions
- Decision by: Lord Somervell, Lord Denning and Lord Romer

Warren v Keen is an English Landlord–tenant law case concerning the obligations of both parties. It is still good law and is well known for Lord Denning's ruling on a tenant's duty to use the let property in a tenant-like manner.

== Facts ==
A property was damaged after pipes froze, and the landlord sought to hold the tenant responsible for dilapidations.

== Judgment ==
The Court below found for the landlord. The Court of Appeal overturned this and found for the tenant.

=== Tenant-like manner ===
Lord Denning's words on using the property in a tenant-like manner, often quoted, were as follows:

But what does it mean, "to use the premises in a tenant-like manner"? It can, I think, best be shown by some illustrations. The tenant must take proper care of the place. He must, if he is going away for the winter, turn off the water and empty the boiler. He must clean the chimneys, when necessary, and also the windows. He must mend the electric light when it fuses. He must unstop the sink when it is blocked by his waste. In short, he must do the little jobs about the place which a reasonable tenant would do. In addition, he must, of course, not damage the house, wilfully or negligently; and he must see that his family and guests do not damage it; and if they do, he must repair it. But apart from such things, if the house falls into disrepair through fair wear and tear or lapse of time or for any reason not caused by him, then the tenant is not liable to repair it.

In England & Wales, where a tenant is not keeping the property in a tenant-like manner, the landlord may serve a Notice of Eviction under Section 8 of the Housing Act 1988, pleading ground 12.
