= House in multiple occupation =

Dwelling with two or more tenancies

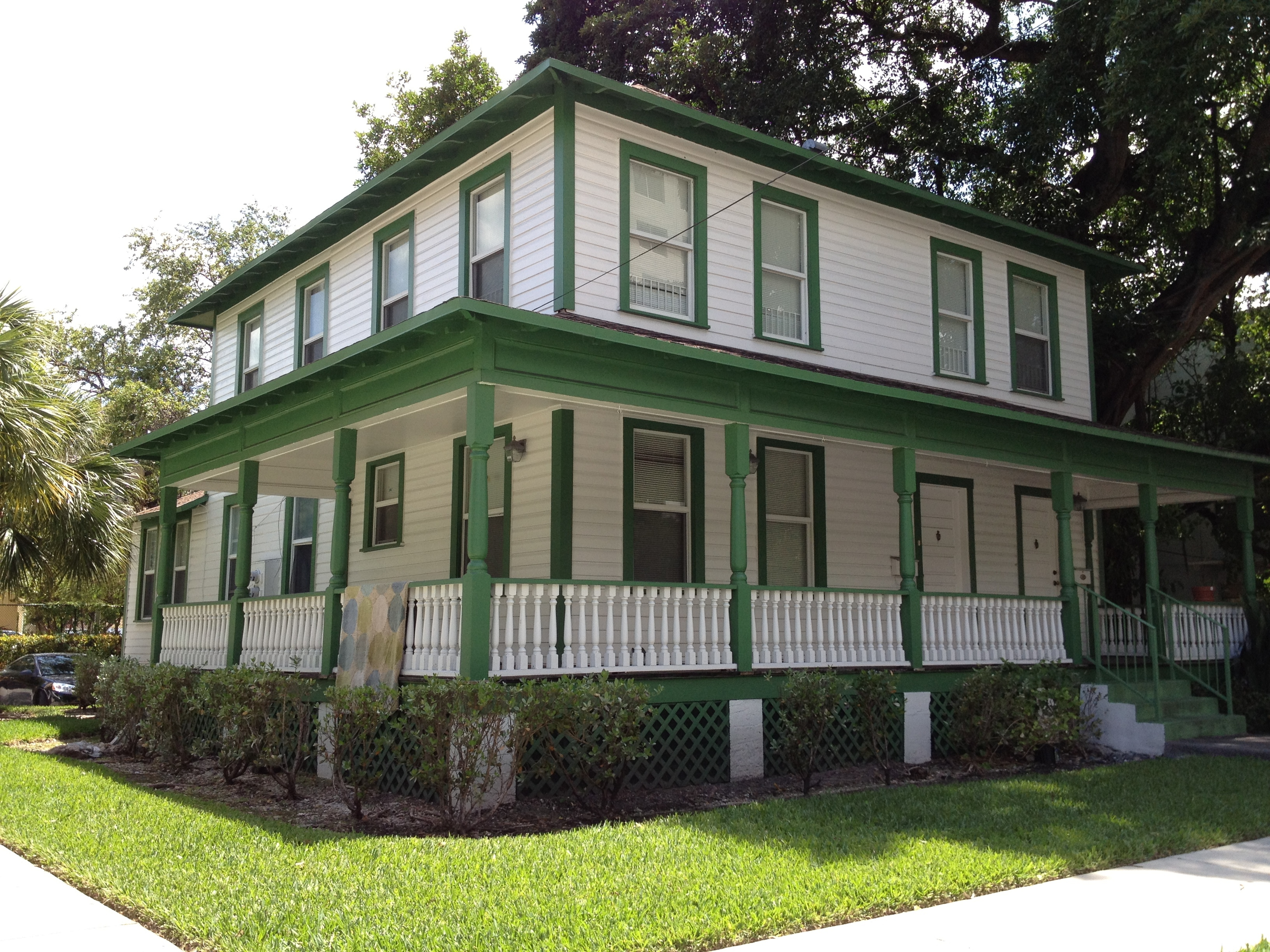
A rooming house in the Lummus Park Historic District in Miami

A house in multiple occupation (HMO), or a rooming house, is a residential property occupied by more than one household which have shared 'common areas'. In the United Kingdom, this is called a 'house of multiple occupation', in North America it is a 'rooming house'.

Most such homes have been subdivided from larger houses, designed for and occupied by one family.

Some housing legislation makes a distinction between buildings occupied mainly on long leases and those where the majority of the occupants are short-term tenants. The legislation has its origins in fire safety legislation, following a series of publicised, preventable deaths in overcrowded buildings.

== Design ==
A multiple occupancy house typically has a bathroom which is shared by all tenants. Some may also have a common kitchen, whereas others provide kitchenettes for each occupant. Contractually speaking, common areas may also include stairwells, gardens and landings. Houses may be divided up into self-contained flats, bed-sitting rooms or simple lodgings.

== History ==
=== Canada ===
A study of rooming houses in Ottawa, Ontario, in 2016 found that "many units are in very poor condition", with issues such as mould, cockroaches, bedbugs, and broken locks. An article about Montreal rooming houses stated that the units often contain bedbugs and "faulty plumbing".

Rooming houses tend to be located in places close to access, amenities and markets. Specialist builders are inclined to build up to nine high-standard, low-maintenance micro apartments, where once a single occupant would have returned just one rental.

In one Ottawa study, more than 50% of the occupants in rooming houses were found to have mental health diagnoses. A 1998 study of Toronto rooming house residents found that they had poorer health than the general population and low incomes.

A study of 295 residents from 171 rooming houses in Toronto found that "residents aged 35 years and older had significantly poorer health status than their counterparts in the Canadian general population" and the residents had a "high prevalence of ill health", with the worst-off residents (from a health perspective) living in the poorest-maintained and most substandard rooming houses.

An article about rooming houses in Montreal stated that rooming houses are the "last stop before the street" for low-income people at risk of homelessness.

=== United Kingdom ===
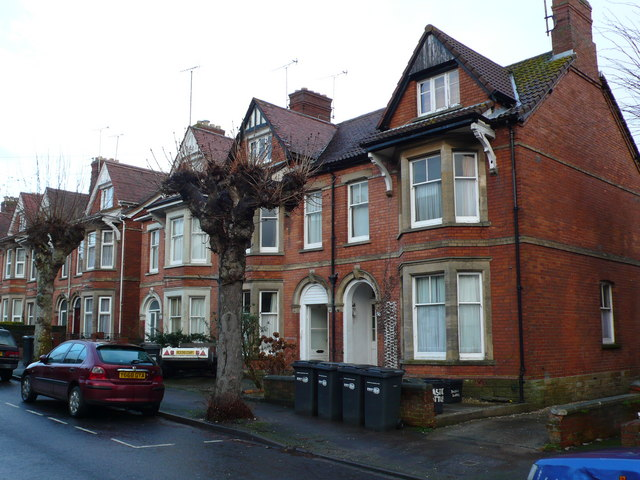
Houses in Yeovil, some of which have multiple occupants

In the United Kingdom, after a series of deaths in overcrowded houses, legislation was introduced ensuring they have a higher standing of fire-proofing to be legally compliant. According to the Campaign for Bedsit Rights, three people a week died in fires in houses in multiple occupation between 1985 and 1991.

Multiple occupancy dwellings were principally defined by the Housing Act 1985, as being "...a house which is occupied by persons who do not form a single household". The Local Government and Housing Act 1989 expanded the definition to include any part of a building which:

1. "would not [ordinarily] be regarded as a house" and
2. "was originally constructed or subsequently adapted for occupation by a single household"

Both the 1985 and the 1989 Acts were superseded by the Housing Act 2004, which established a more complete and complex definition and also introduced the requirement for some multiple tenant houses to be subject to mandatory licensing (see below).

The Housing Act 1985 was a consolidating act. The definition of HMO in section 345 HA85 was from section 129(1) of the Housing Act 1974.

The Housing Act 2004 introduced mandatory licensing for large HMOs which were defined in the act as properties with five or more tenants forming more than one household sharing facilities such as kitchen, bathroom and/or toilets over three or more floors.

On 1 October 2018, the Licensing of Houses in Multiple Occupation (Prescribed Description) (England) Order 2018 amended the large HMO definition in the 2004 Act by abolishing the "3 or more floors" requirement. Nevertheless, purpose-built flats in a block of three or more such flats were excluded from the amended classification.

Apart from the statutory definition of HMOs requiring a mandatory licence, local authorities have the power to introduce approved licensing schemes which include smaller HMOs as licensable. Typically these are for three or more tenants forming more than one household.

==== Section 257 HMOs ====
The Housing Act 2004 (HA) introduced a classification of HMO under section 257 of that Act which includes self-contained flats in a converted block, where:

- the conversion did not comply with 1991 building regulations
- less than two-thirds of the self-contained flats are owner-occupied

This classification helps bring buildings with inadequate fire and safety regulations under the control of local authority (LA) inspection regimes. Section 257 HMOs are often expressly included in LA additional licensing schemes for HMOs.

==== Council Tax ====
The Council Tax (Liability for Owners) Regulations 1992 provide a different definition of HMO that is used solely for determining Council Tax liability. Typically, the landlord is required to pay Council Tax on behalf of tenants.

HMO schemes have been subsequently introduced to other parts of the UK, though the legal definition of what constitutes an HMO varies between Scotland, Northern Ireland, England, and Wales.

Generally, in the United Kingdom, an HMO has the following characteristics:

- at least three tenants live there, forming more than one household and
- toilet, bathroom or kitchen facilities are shared between tenants.

Definitions of what constitutes an HMO and a household are set out in the law for each legal jurisdiction.

==== England and Wales ====
A home is a large HMO if all of the following apply:

- at least five tenants live there, forming more than one household
- toilet, bathroom or kitchen facilities are shared between tenants

Before 1 October 2018, there was an additional criterion that the building was three or more storeys. Landlords of large HMOs must apply for a licence and must comply with certain standards and obligations.

HMOs do not need to be licensed if they are managed or owned by a housing association or co-operative, a council, a further education institute or student housing provider, a health service or a police or fire authority.

Where an Article 4 direction has been applied by a local authority, planning permission is required for the change of use of a dwelling house to HMO accommodation in the area designated. This is usually to protect the housing mix in particular areas of a city; for example in Newcastle upon Tyne article 4 directives have come into force in parts of Heaton, Jesmond, South Gosforth, Sandyford and Spital Tongues.

===== Local authorities =====
In England and Wales, local authorities manage and enforce the licensing of HMOs.

Depending on the region of the authority, they have some or all of the following powers, to vary:

- the minimum size of a property requiring a licence
- the licence fee and
- the conditions of the licence.

===== Penalties in England and Wales =====
Failure to apply for or comply with the terms of a licence for an HMO constitutes a criminal offence. Tenants may be able to recover up to 12 months' rent from an unlicensed HMO landlord. Since the Housing and Planning Act 2016 (HaPA), tenants can make a Rent Repayment Order (RRO) application directly against the landlord and without waiting for the council to prosecute first (the situation under the Housing Act 2004 (HA)). Some tenants have been successful in recovering rent from landlords of unlicensed HMOs.

==== Northern Ireland ====
Northern Ireland is a separate legal jurisdiction within the UK and all HMOs must be registered and must comply with certain standards and obligations. In Northern Ireland a property is an HMO if three or more people live in it, these people form at least three separate families or households and at least one person is paying some form of rent to live in the property. New regulations came in to force in April 2019 and a new licensing scheme managed by local councils has replaced the centralised registration scheme. Landlords must pass a fit and proper persons test; fixed penalties have been introduced HMO managers have to adhere to a Code of Practice.

==== Scotland ====
Multiple tenant house licensing was first introduced in Scotland in 2000. To be granted a licence under the scheme, properties must meet certain standards, such as presence of smoke detectors and fire doors. These provisions were included in response to a fatal fire at a student flat in Glasgow, which had no working smoke detectors, and metal bars preventing escape through a window.

Scotland is a separate legal jurisdiction within the UK, and all HMOs must be registered and must comply with certain standards and obligations. An HMO in Scotland is a property that is shared by three or more tenants who are not members of the same family or household. The landlord must be "a fit and proper person" and there are annual inspections to check the property (2006 Act). Hostels and halls of residence for students or nurses are considered to be HMOs in Scotland and the Scottish Government is considering extending the definition of an HMO. At the end of March 2019, there were over 15,600 licences in force and 87% of them were accounted for by the four major cities and the Fife local authority (Aberdeen, Dundee, Edinburgh and Glasgow). Edinburgh accounts for almost two-fifths of Scotland's HMO licences due to its higher rents, large student population, tourist lets and young professionals sharing.

== Cost for tenants ==
Shared house living spaces are often smaller but typically cheaper than a one-bedroom flat. Tenancy agreements often include most utility bills with the rent, because it is difficult for landlords to apportion the cost of bills to each tenant fairly and it is also more appealing to potential tenants.

== Rooming house investment ==
Shared houses are popular with buy-to-let investors because, it is believed, they have higher income-generating potential than ordinary or 'vanilla' buy-to-let properties. By splitting single properties into multiple bedsits that are each let out on separate tenancy agreements, landlords can also reduce their exposure to loss of earnings through rental arrears or voids. While HMOs may generate higher income, HMO investments, at least in heavily regulated Scotland, entail significantly higher initial costs if compared with regular buy-to-let properties due to significant costs of licensing, safety checks and certificates, fireproofing, alarms, joinery and other required remedials.

=== Controversy ===
Whilst some argue that investment is necessitated by insufficient housing supply others claim that it is exploiting it.

Although shared accommodation can improve affordability and community engagement, critics argue that it may accelerate gentrification or reduce access to long-term tenancies. Some cities such as Barcelona and Berlin have introduced regulations defining minimum unit sizes and tenancy protections to prevent speculative use. Proponents contend that with proper regulation, co-living can help cities repurpose underused buildings and provide flexible accommodation for transient workers, students, and newcomers.

=== Finance ===
Due to the additional legal requirements placed upon HMO landlords, many buy-to-let mortgage lenders refuse to finance HMO properties. This has led to the emergence of a specialised HMO mortgage market, catered for by a smaller subset of lenders. Because the choice of products is narrower, HMO mortgage borrowers are often subject to stricter criteria. Often they need larger cash deposits, as the average loan-to-value ratio is slightly lower than for an ordinary buy-to-let mortgage, while the minimum property value tends to be higher. Borrowers who are financing unlicensed HMOs may also be required to prove that their local authority has no intention to license the property in the future. It is also common for HMO mortgage lenders to levy stipulations on various aspects of the property, including the number of rooms permitted, the type of tenancy agreement and the type of locks installed on internal and external doors.

== See also ==
- Hostels
- Group home, rooming or boarding house style accommodations for adults with special needs or children whose families can no longer handle them
- Student accommodation
