= Starter tenancy =

A Starter tenancy is a type of tenancy in England which are offered by some housing associations. They are trial tenancies and tenants are easier to evict during this period.

== See also ==
- Demoted tenancy
