= Non-secure tenancy =

A non-secure tenancy is a type of tenancy in England and Wales under Part VII of the Housing Act 1996. They are usually granted where a Council has a duty to a homeless person.

== See also ==
- Secure tenancy
