= Property retailer =

In the U.K., a property retailer is an organisation marketing property for sale, but not offering Estate Agency services. Property Retailers are usually online based. Estate Agents in the UK are regulated by the Office of Fair Trading/The Property Ombudsman, and there is also legislation relating to property descriptions and procedures which must be adhered to. Estate Agent services include fielding enquiries on behalf of sellers, arranging appointments and viewings, and handling negotiations. There are now many property websites offering a service by charging a one-off fee.
