= Right to Buy =

Home ownership policy active in England and Northern Ireland

The Right to Buy scheme is a policy in the United Kingdom, with the exception of Scotland since 1 August 2016 and Wales from 26 January 2019, which gives secure tenants of councils and some housing associations the legal right to buy, at a large discount, the council house they are living in. There is also a Right to Acquire for assured tenants of housing association dwellings built with public subsidy after 1997, at a smaller discount. By 1997, over 1,700,000 dwellings in the UK had been sold under the scheme since its introduction in 1980, with the scheme being cited as one of the major factors in the drastic reduction in the amount of social housing in the UK, which has fallen from nearly 6.5 million units in 1979 to roughly 2 million units in 2017, while also being credited as the main driver of the 15% rise in home ownership, which rose from 55% of householders in 1979 to a peak of 71% in 2003; this figure has declined in England since the late 2000s to 63% in 2017.

Right to Buy is the jurisdiction of the Minister of State for Housing. Critics claim that the policy compounded a housing shortage for people of low income, initiated a national house price bubble, and led ultimately to what is commonly recognised as the displacement and gentrification of traditional communities.

== History ==
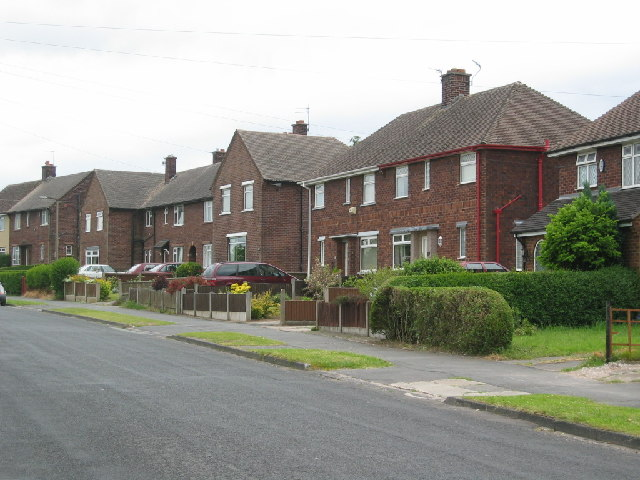
Council-type housing stock in Weaverham, now mostly owner-occupied

Local authorities have had the ability to sell council houses to their tenants since the Housing Act 1936. Many were sold under the discretionary powers of Housing Act 1957 (S104)(1). Sales under this act contained a pre-emptive clause requiring the tenant/buyer to offer the Council first refusal within five years of purchase. Any sale within five years of purchase was restricted to the acquisition value plus the value of any improvements. but until the early 1970s such sales were limited: between 1957 and 1964, some 16,000 council houses were sold in England. The Labour Party initially proposed the idea of the right of tenants to own the house they live in, in their manifesto for the 1959 general election, which they lost. In 1968, a circular was issued limiting sales in cities but was withdrawn by an incoming Conservative government in 1970.

In the meantime, council house sales to tenants began to increase. Some 7,000 were sold to their tenants during 1970; this soared to more than 45,000 in 1972.

=== Thatcher policies ===
After Margaret Thatcher became Prime Minister in May 1979, the legislation to implement the Right to Buy was passed in the Housing Act 1980. Michael Heseltine, in his role as Secretary of State for the Environment, was in charge of implementing the legislation. Some 6,000,000 people were affected; about one in three actually purchased their housing unit. Heseltine noted that "no single piece of legislation has enabled the transfer of so much capital wealth from the state to the people". He said the right to buy had two main objectives: to give people what they wanted and to reverse the trend of ever-increasing dominance of the state over the life of the individual.

He said: "There is in this country a deeply ingrained desire for home ownership. The Government believe that this spirit should be fostered. It reflects the wishes of the people, ensures the wide spread of wealth through society, encourages a personal desire to improve and modernise one's own home, enables parents to accrue wealth for their children and stimulates the attitudes of independence and self-reliance that are the bedrock of a free society."

The sale price of a council house was based on its market valuation, discounted initially by between 33% and 50% (up to 70% for council flats), which was said to reflect the rents paid by tenants and also to encourage take-up; the maximum discount was raised to 60% in 1984 and 70% in 1986. By 1988, the average discount that had by then actually been given was 44%. The local authority was obliged to offer a mortgage with no deposit. The discount depended on how long tenants had been living in the house, with the proviso that if they subsequently sold their house within a minimum period they would have to pay back a proportion of the discount. The policy became one of the major points of Thatcherism.

The policy proved immediately popular. Some local Labour-controlled councils were opposed, but the legislation prevented them from blocking purchases and enabled them to redeem debt. Sales were much higher in the south and east of England than in inner London and northern England. Sales were restricted to general-needs housing; adapted properties and those built specifically for older people were exempted from the scheme.

Half the proceeds of the sales were paid to the local authorities, but the government restricted authorities' use of most of the money to reducing their debt until it was cleared rather than spending it on building more homes. The effect was to reduce the council housing stock, especially in areas where property prices were high, such as London and the south-east of England.

In 1982, 200,000 council houses were sold to their tenants. By 1987, more than 1,000,000 council houses in the UK had been sold to their tenants, although the number of council houses purchased by tenants declined during the 1990s.

The Labour Party was initially against the sales and pledged to oppose them at the 1983 general election but dropped its official opposition to the scheme in 1985. However, at the 1987 general election, the Conservative government claimed to voters that a Labour government would still abolish the scheme.

When Labour returned to power at the 1997 general election, it reduced the discount available to tenants in local authorities which had severe pressure on their housing stock; this included almost the whole of London.

== Right to Buy rules after 2005 ==
The Right to Buy rules were changed in 2005. Five years' tenancy was now required for new tenants to qualify, and properties purchased after January 2005 could no longer immediately be placed on the open market should the owner decide to sell. Such owners now had to approach their previous landlord (council or housing association) and offer them the right of first refusal. If the previous landlord was no longer in existence, for example in cases where the former landlord was a registered social landlord that has ceased business, then the property had to first be offered to the local housing authority.

The time in which a Right to Buy conveyance should take place was reduced from 12 months to 3 months. The Financial Conduct Authority (FCA) now governed and regulated most types of mortgage selling.

The FCA's governance of Right to Buy purchases was partly to solve the widespread problem of Right to Buy mis-selling from brokers and solicitors alike. They all had their own agendas, and many were charging excessive fees that were then taken out of their client's discount. The above actions that have been taken coupled with the end of the boom period seem to have brought this problem under control.

In 2009, the Localis think tank suggested, as part of a review of principles for social housing reform, that the right to buy should be extended into equity slivers, which could be part-earned through being a good tenant.

The qualifying period changed from 5 years to 3 years in 2018.

== Recent changes ==
At the 2011 Conservative Party Conference, David Cameron proposed to increase Right to Buy discounts in order to revitalise the housing market and generate receipts which could be spent on new housing. Social housing professionals expressed concerns over the proposal.

As of 2 April 2012, the Right to Buy discount was increased to a maximum of £75,000 or 60% of the house value (70% for a flat) depending on which is lower. In March 2013, the maximum discount in London was increased to £100,000. The maximum right to buy discount increases each financial year in line with CPI as at the previous September.

The aim of the scheme is, for every additional home sold, a new home will be built for 'affordable rent' at up to 80% of market rent, aimed at maintaining the level of affordable housing while also increasing the number of properties available for those on the waiting list. The five year tenancy criterion will remain, and should the property be sold within the first five years of the original sale, part or all of the discount will be required to be paid back.

The Housing and Planning Act 2016 extended right-to-buy to housing association tenants.

Since 21 November 2024 the maximum discount available has been significantly reduced. It varies depending on region, with some local authorities also subject to specific rules, but the maximum discount on applications after 21 November 2024 is the lower of 70% of the value of the property or £38,000. This maximum applies to two London local authorities, LB Barking & Dagenham and LB Havering and several local authorities in the South East region but elsewhere in London the maximum discount is £16,000.

In 2024-25, Right to Buy sales in England totalled over 4,000, continuing to reduce the social housing stock despite pressure on councils to retain affordable homes for those on waiting lists.

=== Scotland ===
In July 2013, the Scottish Government confirmed that Right to Buy would be abolished in Scotland from 2017. It was in the end abolished as a part of the Housing (Scotland) Act 2014 from 1 August 2016.

=== Wales ===
In the summer of 2017, the Welsh Government proposed a law to abolish Right to Buy in Wales. The Abolition of the Right to Buy and Associated Rights (Wales) Act 2018 was passed by the National Assembly in December 2017, and the scheme ended on 26 January 2019.

== Criticisms ==
The Right to Buy scheme has been criticised for the following reasons:

- Speculating investors were able to buy up council properties through deferred transaction agreements, hastening the rise in property costs;
- Commercially and socially valuable council assets were sold at below their market value or replacement cost, which can be seen to be an imprudent waste of public money;
- The remaining stock of council housing was concentrated in undesirable areas with little employment opportunity, further isolating and stigmatising the tenants.

A report published in January 2013 by London Assembly member Tom Copley, From Right to Buy to Buy to Let, showed that 36% of homes sold under Right to Buy in London (52,000 homes) were being rented by councils from private landlords, leading to criticisms that the scheme "represents incredibly poor value for money to taxpayers" since it "helped to fuel the increase in the housing benefit bill, heaped more pressure on local authority waiting lists and led to more Londoners being forced into the under-regulated private rented sector". A survey in 2013 showed around one third of Right to Buy houses were now owned by private landlords, while the son of the late Ian Gow (Thatcher's housing minister) owned some 40 houses.

In 2015, Alan Murie concluded that "the proposed extension of right-to-buy could not easily be reconciled with the independence and charitable status of housing associations" and that "extending the right-to-buy to housing association tenants revived a previous Parliamentary debate and raised questions about the legal position of charities and the risks faced by housing associations and their funders".

A 2017 BBC survey of council areas where waiting lists were rising showed the councils had bought back houses they had been forced to sell, sometimes at many times the original price. Housing charities criticised the lack of investment in affordable housing.

== See also ==
- Help to Buy
- The Housing Question
