= Accelerated possession procedure =

In England and Wales the accelerated possession procedure is a method by which a landlord can obtain an order for possession against an Assured Shorthold Tenant following the service of a section 21 notice. The landlord must use a form called N5B.

The procedure is governed by Part 55 Civil Procedure Rules 1998.
