= The Housing Question =

1872 essay by Friedrich Engels

"The Housing Question" is a series of articles by Friedrich Engels originally published in Der Volksstaat in 1872, and later collected into a pamphlet. In it he criticizes an anarchist Proudhonist program of the Right to Buy, which he characterizes as "Petty Bourgeois Socialism", and also the liberal bourgeois philanthropic answer to housing issues of Emil Sax. He argues that neither fundamentally affect the root cause of housing problems.

== Content and analysis ==
Engels wrote:

The expansion of the big modern cities gives the land in certain sections of them, particularly in those which are centrally situated, an artificial, often economically increasing, value; the buildings erected in those areas depress this value . . . because they no longer correspond to the changed circumstances. . . . The result is that the workers are forced out of the center of the town, toward the outskirts.

Jacobin wrote that this resonates with current developments where inner city buildings are threatened with demolition.

== See also ==
- Right to Buy
