= Renters' Rights Act 2025 =

UK housing rental legislation

Renters' Rights Act 2025 (Note: Section 149.)
- Act of Parliament
- Parliament of the United Kingdom
- Long title: An Act to make provision changing the law about rented homes, including provision abolishing fixed term assured tenancies and assured shorthold tenancies; imposing obligations on landlords and others in relation to rented homes and temporary and supported accommodation; and for connected purposes.
- Citation: 2025 c. 26
- Introduced by: Angela Rayner, Secretary of State for Housing, Communities and Local Government (Commons); Baroness Taylor of Stevenage (Lords)
- Territorial extent: England and Wales; Scotland; (Note: Section 144.)

Dates
- Royal assent: 27 October 2025
- Commencement: Various (Note: Section 145.)
Other legislation
Amends	Reserve and Auxiliary Forces (Protection of Civil Interests) Act 1951; Land Compensation Act 1973; Greater London Council (General Powers) Act 1973; Local Government Act 1974; Rent Act 1977; Protection from Eviction Act 1977; Rent (Scotland) Act 1984; Housing Act 1985; Landlord and Tenant Act 1985; Agricultural Holdings Act 1986; Housing (Scotland) Act 1988; Housing Act 1988; Local Government and Housing Act 1989; Local Government Finance Act 1992; Housing Act 1996; Government of Wales Act 1998; Capital Allowances Act 2001; Criminal Justice and Police Act 2001; Homelessness Act 2002; Police Reform Act 2002; Finance Act 2003; Anti-social Behaviour Act 2003; Housing Act 2004; Public Services Ombudsman (Wales) Act 2005; Regulatory Enforcement and Sanctions Act 2008; Housing and Regeneration Act 2008; Localism Act 2011; Charities Act 2011; Housing (Wales) Act 2014; Consumer Rights Act 2015; Deregulation Act 2015; Renting Homes (Wales) Act 2016; Immigration Act 2016; Private Housing (Tenancies) (Scotland) Act 2016; Housing and Planning Act 2016; Finance Act 2019; Renting Homes (Fees, Discrimination etc.) (Wales) Act 2019; Tenant Fees Act 2019; Renting Homes (Model Written Statements of Contract) (Wales) Regulations 2022; Building Safety Act 2022; Renting Homes (Rent Determination) (Converted Contracts) (Wales) Regulations 2022; Leasehold and Freehold Reform Act 2024

Status: Current legislation

History of passage through Parliament

Text of statute as originally enacted

Revised text of statute as amended

The Renters' Rights Act 2025 (c. 26) is an act of the Parliament of the United Kingdom designed to improve the rights of people renting a home in England.

It has been called a "key plank of the government's housing reforms".

== Background ==
The Renters (Reform) Bill 2023 proposed by the previous Conservative government did not pass before the 2024 United Kingdom general election. Instead, the new Labour government proposed its own Renters' Rights Bill in September 2024 with certain additional rights, reflecting intentions expressed in the Labour Party's 2024 manifesto.

== Provision examples ==
Sections 1 to 3 ends "assured shorthold tenancies" and require that assured tenancies are periodic with rent payable each month - described in the act as assured periodic tenancies.

Sections 4 to 6 narrow the grounds for eviction and possession by a landlord, and require four months' notice before any eviction for sale of a property, housing a family member, or moving back in.

Sections 7 to 9 enable a tenant to challenge increases of rent. At least two months notice must be given before raising rent at the end of any contract.

Section 10 enable tenants the right to request permission to keep a pet, and landlords may only refuse if they have a good reason.

Sections 32 to 54 prohibit discrimination against tenants based on them having children, or being on benefits.

Sections 56 and 57 (Chapter 6) require the rent to be stated and aims to avoid rental bidding. Landlords cannot take higher rent than advertised, also if offered by a tenant.

Section 98 and Schedule 4 provide for a new "decent homes standard". The standard reflects three criteria: the condition of the property, provisions for tenants' safety and comfort, and the provision of adequate heating and cooling facilities.

== Significance ==
The act's aim is to "dampen rent rises", after in the year to July 2024, "average private-sector rents in England increased 8.6%, while in London that figure was 9.7%". Recent figures from the online estate portal Rightmove suggest that "there are now 17 households bidding for each advertised rental property".

== Timeline ==
The act received royal assent on 27 October 2025.

Ministry of Justice data showed landlord possession claims declining ahead of the act's implementation, falling 11% year-on-year to 21,458 in the final quarter of 2025. However, repossessions by county court bailiffs increased 3% over the same period, with median claim-to-repossession timelines at 27 weeks. Accelerated claims - used for Section 21 evictions - fell 17% year-on-year.

Implementation is expected in stages throughout 2026. Section 21 abolition took effect from 1 May 2026, when the first phase of the act came into force, with the private rented sector database and Decent Homes Standard following later in the year.

Bristol City Council became one of the first local authorities to consult on penalty levels under the act in February 2026, seeking tenant input on fine scales for areas where councils have discretion.

A Freedom of Information investigation in March 2026 found significant variation in council preparedness for enforcing the act. Of 20 major councils surveyed, only five - Liverpool, Sheffield, Newcastle, Bristol and Brighton and Hove - confirmed operational readiness for the 1 May 2026 commencement date. Four councils admitted their enforcement plans remained incomplete, while seven failed to respond within the statutory deadline. Liverpool allocated 34 full-time equivalent enforcement staff, while Bristol budgeted for two.

== See also ==
- English land law
- Eviction in England
- UK enterprise law
