= Section 8 notice =

In England and Wales, a Section 8 notice, also known as a Section 8 notice to quit or Form 3, is a notice required to be given in England and Wales by the landlord to the tenant of an assured periodic tenancy (or assured tenancy) when wishing to obtain a possession order from the court, thereby ending the tenancy, for a reason based on a circumstance entitling the landlord to possession under the grounds pleaded. "Section 8" refers to that section of the Housing Act 1988, as amended by the Housing Act 1996 and the Renters' Rights Act 2025.

== Overview ==
A Section 8 notice cites one or more of 17 'grounds', which are detailed in legislation. Several of the grounds have multiple elements. The landlord can seek to regain possession of the property before or after the fixed term of the tenancy comes to an end based only on these grounds. When the landlord serves the tenant with the Section 8 notice, they have to state the grounds by which they are seeking possession of the property, using the precise wording specified in schedule 2 of the Housing Act 1988 and the reasons for relying on these grounds. The notice must be in the prescribed form for a Section 8 notice.

== How the Section 8 notice is served ==
Once the Section 8 notice has been filled out, it must be sent to all of the tenants living at the address.

It is customary to allow a minimum of two working days for the Section 8 notice to arrive at the address of the tenant. The Section 8 notice expires two weeks or two, or more months after this date, depending on which of the grounds have been cited. It is only once the Section 8 notice has expired, and the issue has not been resolved, that the landlord can apply for a possession order from the County Court.

== The possession order ==
Once the Section 8 notice period has expired, the landlord can apply to the court for a hearing to get a possession order using the forms N119 and N5 and by paying the court fees.

The landlord is then given a date to attend court, the first hearing, and must attend on this date. If the tenant has not filed a defence or does not attend court to challenge the claim, the court may make a possession order at the first hearing. If the tenant does defend the claim, the court will usually issue directions at the first hearing and adjourn the claim until a further hearing when the case will be heard in full. If the possession order is granted, then it usually takes effect fourteen days after it has been issued, although in some cases this may be extended to six weeks where it is deemed that the tenant will face serious hardship as a result of the repossession.

== Notice Periods ==
When the Section 8 notice is served, the landlord must base the decision to apply for a possession order on one or more of 17 grounds. The court will then decide upon whether to grant a possession order based on these grounds.

The minimum amount of notice that must be given to the tenant differs depending on the grounds. For grounds 1, 1A, 1B, 2, 2ZA, 2ZB, 2ZC, 2ZD, 4A, 6, 6A, and 6B, four months' notice or more must be given. For grounds 5, 5A, 5B, 5C, 5D, 5H, 7 and 9, the minimum is two months' notice. For grounds 5E, 5F, 5G, 8, 10, 11, 18, four weeks' notice is the minimum and for grounds 4, 7B, 12, 13, 14ZA, 14A, 15 and 17, two weeks' notice is required. In the case of ground 7A or 14, proceedings can be started immediately after serving the notice.

During the COVID-19 pandemic in 2020 most of the periods of notice were extended significantly in order to reduce the number of people potentially being made homeless in a period of crisis. With exceptions for significant rent owed and anti-social behaviour, most periods of notice were set to be six months.

Grounds 1 to 8 are mandatory, meaning if the landlord can prove to the court that they apply then the court must grant the possession order. The other grounds are all discretionary.

=== Mandatory grounds for possession ===
==== Ground 1: landlord taking property as their own home ====
Used when the landlord or a member of their immediate family wishes to live in the property as a permanent home. It is usually only permitted when the landlord has previously lived in it as their main home.

Evidence of this will usually be required, together with evidence that the landlord intends to leave their current home.

==== Ground 1B: landlord wishing to enter into a Rent-to-Buy agreement for the property ====
Ground 1 and 1A cannot be served during the first 12 months of a tenancy.

==== Ground 2: mortgage repossession ====
Used when the property is subject to a mortgage that existed before the start of the tenancy, and the lender wants to repossess the property.

==== Ground 3: holiday let ====
Used when the tenancy is for a period of a maximum of eight months and the property was occupied as a holiday let within the period of twelve months prior to the start of the tenancy. Written notice must be given before or at the start of the tenancy that possession might be recovered based on this ground.

==== Ground 4: property tied to an educational institution ====
Used when the tenancy is for a period of no more than twelve months and the property belongs to an educational institution. Written notice must be given before or at the start of the tenancy that possession might be recovered based on this ground.

==== Ground 5: housing provided for a purpose that has ended ====
Used when the property is being used by a minister of religion, agricultural worker, policeman or someone being homed by the state and the tenant no longer meets the criteria for such housing or it is required for another person.

==== Ground 6: refurbishment ====
Used when the landlord wants to reconstruct, demolish or carry out works on part or all of the property which cannot go ahead with the tenant there, perhaps because the tenant will not allow access. If this ground is used, the landlord has to pay reasonable removal costs.

==== Ground 7: death of the tenant ====
Used when the previous tenant has deceased and the tenancy has passed to a new tenant but the new tenant does not have the right to carry on with the tenancy. Proceedings must be brought within twelve months following the death of the tenant, or within twelve months of the landlord becoming aware of the death of the tenant.

==== Ground 7A: conviction for serious offence ====
Used when

- the tenant is convicted of a serious offence, or breaches a civil injunction or criminal behaviour injunction under the Anti-social Behaviour, Crime and Policing Act 2014, within the dwelling, against another tenant, or against the landlord or his agent; or
- the dwelling is subject to a closure order under the 2014 Act due to nuisance or disorder; or
- the tenant is convicted of an offence of breaching an abatement notice (a notice by the local authority requiring them to cease causing a nuisance that falls within their enforcement authority) or of causing a statutory nuisance.

"Serious offence" means one listed in schedule 2A of the Housing Act 1985 that is triable in the Crown Court, including a variety of violent, sexual and drug offences, some serious offences against property (e.g. burglary), and modern slavery offences.

==== Ground 7B: service on landlord of notice by Secretary of State in respect of illegal immigrants ====
Used when the tenant is not legally permitted to occupy the dwelling due to their immigration status, and the government (usually the Home Office) has given the landlord notice to this effect.

==== Ground 8: rent arrears ====
Used when a certain amount of the rent is owed on the date that the Section 8 notice is served and on the date of the hearing. Where rent is due weekly or fortnightly, at least thirteen weeks' rent must be in arrears. Where rent is due monthly, at least three months' rent must be in arrears. Where rent is due quarterly, at least a quarter's rent must be in arrears by more than three months. Where rent is due yearly, at least three months' rent must be in arrears by more than three months.

=== Discretionary grounds ===
==== Ground 9: alternative accommodation ====
This ground states that alternative accommodation will be available for the tenant in the case that the possession order is made and that the landlord has to pay reasonable removal expenses.

==== Ground 10: rent arrears ====
Used when any amount of rent due is unpaid on the date that the Section 8 notice is served and is still unpaid on the date that proceedings begin.

==== Ground 11: regular failure to pay rent ====
Used when the tenant has failed on a regular basis to pay the rent. Rent does not have to be in arrears on the date that the Section 8 notice is served.

==== Ground 12: breach of tenancy agreement ====
Used when there has been a breach of any term of the tenancy agreement.

==== Ground 13: neglect of property ====
Used when the property has been neglected by the tenant, sub-tenant or someone living in the property with the tenant who the tenant has not removed and as a result the condition of the property has deteriorated.

==== Ground 14: anti-social behaviour ====
Used when the tenant has caused problems with neighbours, visitors or anyone else; has used the property for illegal or immoral purposes and received a conviction for this; or has received a conviction for an indictable offence in or near the property.

==== Ground 14a: domestic violence ====
Used when the property is occupied by a couple and one member of the couple has left due to violence or threats from the other partner towards the partner who has left or a member of their family who was residing in the property. This ground only applies to property which is owned by a charitable housing trust or registered social landlord.

==== Ground 15: poor treatment of furnishings ====
Used when the furniture in the property has been treated badly by the tenant or by someone residing in the property who the tenant has not removed.

==== Ground 16: tied to employment ====
Used when the tenant was employed by the landlord of the property and has now left the landlord's employment.

==== Ground 17: false statements ====
The tenant is the person, or one of the persons, to whom the tenancy was granted and the landlord was induced to grant the tenancy by a false statement made knowingly or recklessly by—

(a) the tenant, or
(b) a person acting at the tenant's instigation
