= Buy to let =

Property transaction in the UK

Buy to let is a British phrase meaning the purchase of a property specifically to let out, that is to rent it out. A buy-to-let mortgage is a mortgage loan specifically designed for this purpose. Buy-to-let properties are usually residential but the term includes student property investments and hotel room investments.

== History ==
Before the 1980s few people became private landlords. Buying a property to rent was seen as the preserve of professional landlords and people rich enough to pay cash, or who had large deposits that enabled them to obtain commercial mortgages. The modern 'buy-to-let' mortgage was not available and the possibility of buying property to fund a retirement income did not occur to most people. There was no infrastructure of loans, advice, or information.

The critical change came with the Housing Act 1988 when the assured shorthold tenancy came into being. This gave potential landlords and lenders the confidence that tenants would only live in the property for a fixed period.

After the late 1990s buy-to-let grew strongly. According to the Council of Mortgage Lenders, lenders advanced more than 1.7 million buy-to-let loans between 1999 and 2015. The private rented sector more than doubled in size. Buy-to-let mortgage balances outstanding grew to more than £200 billion.

== Benefits and risk ==
As for all property rental, the benefits for a buy-to-let landlord can include a stable income from rental receipts and an accumulation of wealth if house prices go up. Rising house prices in the UK have made buy-to-let a popular way to invest. The main risk involves leveraged speculation, where the landlord takes a loan to buy the property with the expectation that the house can be sold later for a higher price, or that rental income will meet or exceed the cost of the loan. If the landlord cannot meet their mortgage repayments, the lender will seek to repossess the property and sell it to recover the loan. If prices have fallen, leveraging could leave the landlord in negative equity.

Further risks are substantial changes in Government policy (see the section below).

== Yields ==
Research by Paragon Bank in August 2025 found that 87% of landlords reported making a profit, with 21% describing this as a 'large' profit and 66% a 'small' profit. Only 5% reported any form of loss. However, the National Residential Landlords Association reported that average net profits dropped below 4% in early 2025, the lowest since 2007.

The average gross rental yield in the UK stood at approximately 6% to 7% in late 2025, according to data from the Global Property Guide.

== Buy-to-let mortgages ==
Buy-to-let mortgage is a mortgage arrangement in which an investor borrows money to purchase property in the private rented sector in order to let it out to tenants. Buy-to-let mortgages have been on offer in the UK since 1996.

Lenders calculate how much they are willing to lend using a different formula than for an owner-occupied property. They tend to look at the expected monthly rental income to determine the maximum loan available. Depending on the lender, borrowers might also be allowed to include their own personal income in the calculation of the maximum amount that they can borrow. First-time landlords might also be required to have a separate annual income of at least £25,000. For an owner-occupied property, the calculation is typically a multiple of the owner's annual income.

The most common type of buy-to-let mortgage is an interest only option. The interest rate on the mortgage can be fixed or variable. Fixed rates means that the payments would not fluctuate, and variable rates means that the payments may go up or down in line with the Bank of England base rate. The interest rates and fees that are offered on BTL mortgages are, on average, slightly higher than those for an owner-occupied mortgage. This is due to the perception amongst banks and other lending institutions that BTL mortgages represent a greater risk than residential owner-occupier mortgages.

Many people may not be able to qualify for a buy-to-let mortgage. Criteria for acceptance can include deposit amounts, credit rating, and more.

In the late 1990s and during the early part of the 21st century, this type of investment became popular and helped drive house prices dramatically upwards.

== Landlord management practices ==
Research into self-managing landlords published in November 2025 found that 92.5% still relied on informal communication methods such as phone calls, text messages and email to manage property repairs, with only 7.5% using formal maintenance or ticketing software.

The same survey found that 41.5% of landlords identified upcoming regulation and compliance requirements as their main concern for the following 12 months, while 35.8% said they were not fully confident in maintaining an auditable repair trail. Around a third of landlords reported handling maintenance queries outside normal business hours.

== Changes in Government policy ==
=== Tenant protection ===
The government has taken steps to protect tenants over recent years, including compulsory third party deposit protection schemes and compulsory licensing of homes in multiple occupation (HMOs).

The Renters' Rights Act 2025, which received Royal Assent on 27 October 2025, abolished Section 21 'no-fault' evictions in the private rented sector.

A Freedom of Information investigation published in April 2026 found uneven local authority preparedness ahead of the Act's commencement, with only six of 20 surveyed councils confirming that they were ready to enforce the new regime from 1 May 2026.

The market view is that the Act will reduce the supply of available properties and drive up rental prices.

As of December 2025, the average UK house price reached £270,000, with the market showing regional variation - London fell 1% while the North East rose 4.6%.

=== Tax treatment ===
Until 2015, Government policy in respect of buy-to-let had been relatively benign, but this changed in the Budgets and Autumn Statement of 2015. Four major steps were taken to reduce the attractiveness of the investment:

1. Restriction of tax relief on mortgage finance costs to basic rate tax only.
2. Removal of 10% 'wear and tear' allowance.
3. Introduction of additional 3% Stamp duty surcharge.
4. Accelerated payment schedule for Capital Gains Tax due.

These measures collectively increased the cost of acquiring, holding, and disposing of buy-to-let properties. The mortgage interest restriction (known as Section 24) particularly affected higher-rate taxpayers, who could previously deduct the full cost of mortgage interest from rental income before calculating tax. The 3% stamp duty surcharge added thousands of pounds to purchase costs, while the loss of the wear and tear allowance required landlords to evidence actual expenditure rather than claim a flat-rate deduction.

(The changes around tax relief on mortgage finance costs referred to above mean landlords can deduct only the equivalent of basic rate relief on their tax return, which can cause their personal taxation to be pushed into a higher income tax band even if they are not receiving sufficient income to justify it under other circumstances.)

=== Enhanced tax collection measures ===
The government has also taken steps to improve tax collection from BTL landlords over recent years, measures include:

- Giving HMRC access to third party deposit protection schemes (see above).
- Mandatory reporting of landlord details by estate agents to HMRC.
- Giving HMRC access to licence details of homes in multiple occupation (see above).
- Dedicated HMRC tax taskforces deployed to hunt down tax-evading landlords.

HMRC data for January 2026 showed Capital Gains Tax receipts of £16.985 billion, a 69% increase on the previous year. The surge was attributed partly to landlords disposing of assets ahead of Budget changes in October 2024, which raised CGT rates on residential property gains.

Stamp Duty Land Tax receipts reached £15.4 billion in the 12 months to January 2026, an 18% year-on-year increase.

Analysis of HMRC and Companies House data for 2025 showed a record 66,587 new buy-to-let companies were formed during the year, while full-year Capital Gains Tax receipts reached £20.6 billion – a 44 percent increase – as landlords continued to exit personal ownership in favour of limited company structures. The nil-rate threshold has remained frozen at £125,000 since 2014 while average UK house prices rose to £270,000 by December 2025, bringing more transactions into taxable bands.

=== Limited company ownership ===
The use of special purpose vehicles (SPVs) for buy-to-let investment has grown significantly since changes to mortgage interest tax relief were introduced in 2017. By 2025, 43% of mortgaged buy-to-let house purchases were made through limited companies, up from 35% in 2024 and just 7.5% in 2018. In 2025, 49,029 new companies were incorporated specifically for buying and selling real estate, bringing the total number of active businesses in this category to 274,315.

A 2026 survey found that 29% of landlords hold properties exclusively through limited companies, while 65% have created at least one SPV. The trend is particularly pronounced among younger landlords, with 57% of properties held by landlords aged 25–34 being in limited company structures.

=== Prudential Regulation Authority changes to buy-to-let lending criteria ===
The Prudential Regulation Authority regulates a large number, but not all, buy-to-let lenders

Phase I

In September 2016, the PRA announced a deadline of January 1, 2017, for lenders to put in place recommended new minimum underwriting standards for buy-to-let applications.

The PRA stated that the determination of affordability should incorporate an Interest coverage ratio (ICR) calculation, which it defined as: “the ratio of the expected monthly rental income from the buy-to-let property to the monthly interest payments which take into account likely future interest rate increases.”

At the time of its Supervisory Statement SS 13/16, in September 2016, the mortgage industry standard for setting the minimum ICR threshold was 125%. Subsequently, the majority of lenders set a minimum ICR threshold of 145%.

The PRA guidelines went further, recommending that lenders assess a borrower’s ability to keep up monthly mortgage payments if rates went up in the future, suggesting that firms should apply an assumed minimum borrower interest rate of 5.5%.

Phase II

Lenders who fell under the PRA rules, had to interpret a second set of changes and implement these by September 30, 2017. Under the second phase of PRA Rules, the underwriting process applied by lenders became much stricter, particularly for buy-to-let landlords owning four or more properties, labelled ‘portfolio landlords’.

In the Supervisory Statement (SS13/16), the PRA stated:

“The PRA expects firms to recognise that existing experience and skills acquired in buy-to-let lending do not automatically translate into equivalent skills when assessing portfolio landlords. Lending to portfolio landlords is inherently more complex given the quantum of debt in aggregate, the cash flows and costs arising from multiple tenancies and potential risks of property and/or geographical concentrations.”

With the PRA changes, lenders now had to look in much more depth at the borrower’s finances. However, lender interpretation of the new rules varied greatly; with some lenders opting to no longer offer buy-to-let products to portfolio landlords, while others adopted differing approaches to underwriting to this demographic. Portfolio landlords must now submit significantly more information about their existing properties, rental income and business plans than were required prior to this change.

== Buy-to-leave ==
In the UK, particularly in London, there is a phenomenon known as 'buy-to-leave' where investors buy properties and leave them empty in order to benefit from rising house prices without the hassle of having to deal with tenants. Nationally 'buy-to-leave' accounts for a small percentage of vacant properties according to the charity Empty Homes, but Kensington and Chelsea council estimated in 2015 that as many as one in four houses in certain parts of their neighbourhood are affected, driving up prices while restricting the number of households that actually live there. Overall long-term empty houses account for 2% of properties in Kensington and Chelsea. In north London, Camden council managed to reduce the number of empty homes by charging a surcharge of 50% on council tax on homes left empty for more than two years.

Some politicians have blamed overseas investors for buying homes and leaving them empty, but research has found that only 2% of overseas buyers of newly built London property would use the property as a second home, with 65% instead intending to rent them out, and 33% buying them as homes for children attending university in London.

As of 2016 prime central London house prices began falling, reducing the attractiveness of "buy to leave".

== See also ==
- Build to rent
- Remortgage
