= Housing Act 2004 =

Act of the Parliament of the United Kingdom

Housing Act 2004 (Note: Section 270(1).)
- Act of Parliament
- Parliament of the United Kingdom
- Long title: An Act to make provision about housing conditions; to regulate houses in multiple occupation and certain other residential accommodation; to make provision for home information packs in connection with the sale of residential properties; to make provision about secure tenants and the right to buy; to make provision about mobile homes and the accommodation needs of gypsies and travellers; to make other provision about housing; and for connected purposes.
- Citation: 2004 c. 34
- Territorial extent: England and Wales, except that section 270 extends to the United Kingdom and that any amendment or repeal made by this act, other than an amendment or repeal in the Mobile Homes Act 1983 or the Crime and Disorder Act 1998, has the same extent as the enactment to which it relates. (Note: Section 270(11)–(13).)

Dates
- Royal assent: 18 November 2004
- Commencement: Various (Note: Section 270(3)–(10).)
Other legislation
Amends	Housing Associations Act 1985; Airports Act 1986; Water Industry Act 1991; Health Service Commissioners Act 1993; Gas Act 1995
Amended by	National Health Service (Consequential Provisions) Act 2006; Localism Act 2011; Co-operative and Community Benefit Societies Act 2014; Sentencing Act 2020; Renters' Rights Act 2025

Status: Amended

Text of statute as originally enacted

Revised text of statute as amended

The Housing Act 2004 (c. 34) is an act of the Parliament of the United Kingdom.

== Provisions ==
The act introduced Home Information Packs, commonly known as "home sellers' packs", which have since been abandoned.

It also significantly extends the regulation of houses in multiple occupation by requiring some HMOs to be licensed by local authorities. The act provides the legal framework for tenancy deposit schemes, which are intended to ensure good practice regarding deposits in assured shorthold tenancies and make dispute resolution relating to them easier.

The act introduced the Housing health and safety rating system (HHSRS). This made the owners or landlords of buildings responsible for assessing risks to health and safety, and removing these. In the assessment of Stuart Hodkinson, 'While appearing stronger on paper, the new laws have in practice served to reduce hugely the enforcement powers available to regulatory bodies. The HHSRS effectively abolished the previous minimum legal fitness standard for rented housing in England, replacing a black-and-white "pass/fail" approach with a more flexible set of standards not always backed by statutory obligation and open to greater interpretation by landlords and local authority enforcement teams, based on the assessment of risks'.

== See also ==
- Empty dwelling management orders, created by the act
