= Secure tenancy =

Type of tenancy in the United Kingdom

A secure tenancy is a type of tenancy in England and Wales created by the Housing Act 1980. Most tenancies started before 15 January 1989 are likely to be secure. The secure tenancy was replaced on 15 January 1989 for new tenancies by an assured tenancy, with weaker protection, by the Housing Act 1988.
