= The Property Ombudsman =

British ombudsman for property disputes

The Property Ombudsman Scheme
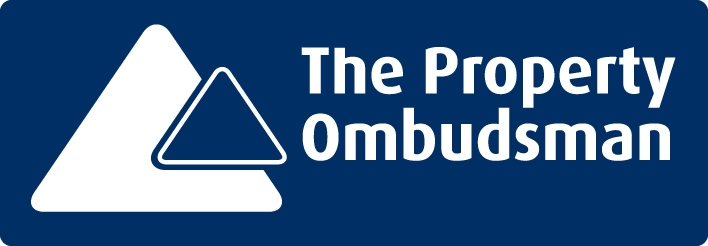
- Formation: Operational:1990 Underpinned by Statute: Estate Agency: December 21, 2007 Letting Agency and property management Agents: October 1, 2014
- Type: Ombudsman
- Headquarters: Salisbury
- Location: United Kingdom
- The Property Ombudsman: Lesley Horton
- Website: www.tpos.co.uk

The Property Ombudsman (TPO) scheme is an ombudsman in the United Kingdom. It has been providing consumers and property agents with an alternative dispute resolution service since 1990.

The scheme was underpinned by statute in 2007 (estate agents) and 2014 (letting and managing agents) and approved by the UK government to help consumers settle their disputes with property businesses such as estate agents, letting agents and property management agents.

== Overview ==
The Property Ombudsman scheme can look at complaints made by consumers against agents registered with the scheme. This may include complaints about poor or incompetent service, including for example: communication and record keeping, marketing and advertising, complaints handling, instructions, terms of business, commission and termination, fees, referencing and inventories.

Before the Ombudsman can look at a complaint against a property business, the consumer must first give the business the opportunity to consider the complaint and attempt to resolve matters. If the business completes its complaints procedure or eight weeks have passed since the initial complaint was made to them, the consumer can take their complaint to the Ombudsman.

The organisation is headquartered in Salisbury.

== Processes ==
The Ombudsman reaches a decision on complaints based on the evidence presented, legal principles, the relevant TPO Code of Practice and what is fair and reasonable in the circumstances.

Where a property business does not subscribe to a TPO Code of Practice, the Ombudsman will make a decision based on best practice, legal principles and what is fair and reasonable.

== Funding ==
The Property Ombudsman is a not-for-profit ombudsman scheme, funded through membership and case fees. The income pays for the administration and functioning of the scheme. This model allows TPO to provide a free service to consumers, at no cost to the UK taxpayer.

== Impartiality ==
The Property Ombudsman publishes an annual report which outlines the proportion of total cases supported. In 2023, 61% of sales cases and 68% of lettings cases were supported in favour of consumers.

The Ombudsman is approved by Government, Trading Standards, the Chartered Trading Standards Institute and the Ombudsman Association as an impartial, unbiased and independent body, though decisions will inevitably be criticised by those parties who have lost.

== Status of ombudsman decisions ==
In 2023, TPO received 57,635 enquiries and accepted 5,644 disputes for investigation.

Annual awards worth £1.52m were granted to consumers.

Nearly half of all complaints received by TPO were resolved before an ombudsman decision was required. 83% of cases resolved by formal decision were found in favour of the consumer. The ombudsman's decision is the final stage of The Property Ombudsman's process. If the consumer accepts the ombudsman's proposed decision then this becomes a final decision and will be in full and final settlement of the dispute. Should the consumer not accept the proposed decision they have the choice to make a representation or choose to reject the decision. If the consumer does not accept the ombudsman's decision their legal rights are not affected and are free to pursue the complaint through the courts.

== Accountability ==
The Property Ombudsman's board has four main roles:

- Appoint the ombudsman
- Set the terms of reference for The Property Ombudsman scheme
- Ensure the ombudsman's independence
- Approve the ombudsman's budget

The Property Ombudsman has an independent reviewer who can consider complaints regarding the service provided by TPO. Raj Tutt is the current independent reviewer.

Satisfaction surveys are conducted for both consumers and property agents; these are conducted on a regular on-going basis and focus on two main factors: Service and Decision/Resolution Satisfaction.

== Ombudsman ==
- David Quayle, 1990 – 1999
- Stephen Car-Smith, 1999 - 2006
- Christopher Hamer, 2006 - 2015
- Katrine Sporle, 2015 – 2020
- Rebecca Marsh, 2020 - 2025
- Lesley Horton, 2025 - present

== Governance structure ==
In 2018 TPO changed its governance structure from a separate council and board to a unitary board. The unitary board is chaired by Baroness Diana Warwick who was previously chair of the TPO council.

== Approvals ==
The Property Ombudsman has a number of different approvals it needs to report to either annually or bi-annually. These are:

Function	Scope	Scheme or regulations
National Trading Standards Estate Agency Team (NTSEAT)	Estate Agents	OFT Approval of estate agents redress schemes (April 2008)
National Trading Standards Estate Agency Team (NTSEAT)	Estate Agents	The Alternative Dispute Resolution for Consumer Disputes (Competent Authorities and Information) Regulations 2015
Ministry of Housing, Communities, and Local Government	Letting and Management Agents	The Redress Scheme for Lettings Agency work and Property Management, Conditions for approval - Final December 2013.
Chartered Trading Standards Institute	All Jurisdictions (excluding estate agents)	The Alternative Dispute Resolution for Consumer Disputes (Competent Authorities and Information) Regulations 2015
Ombudsman Association	All jurisdictions	Ombudsman Association Rules
Chartered Trading Standards Institute	Codes of Practice (Estate and Letting Agents)	Consumer Codes Approval Scheme – Core Criteria and Guidance
