= Assured tenancy =

Type of housing tenancy in the United Kingdom

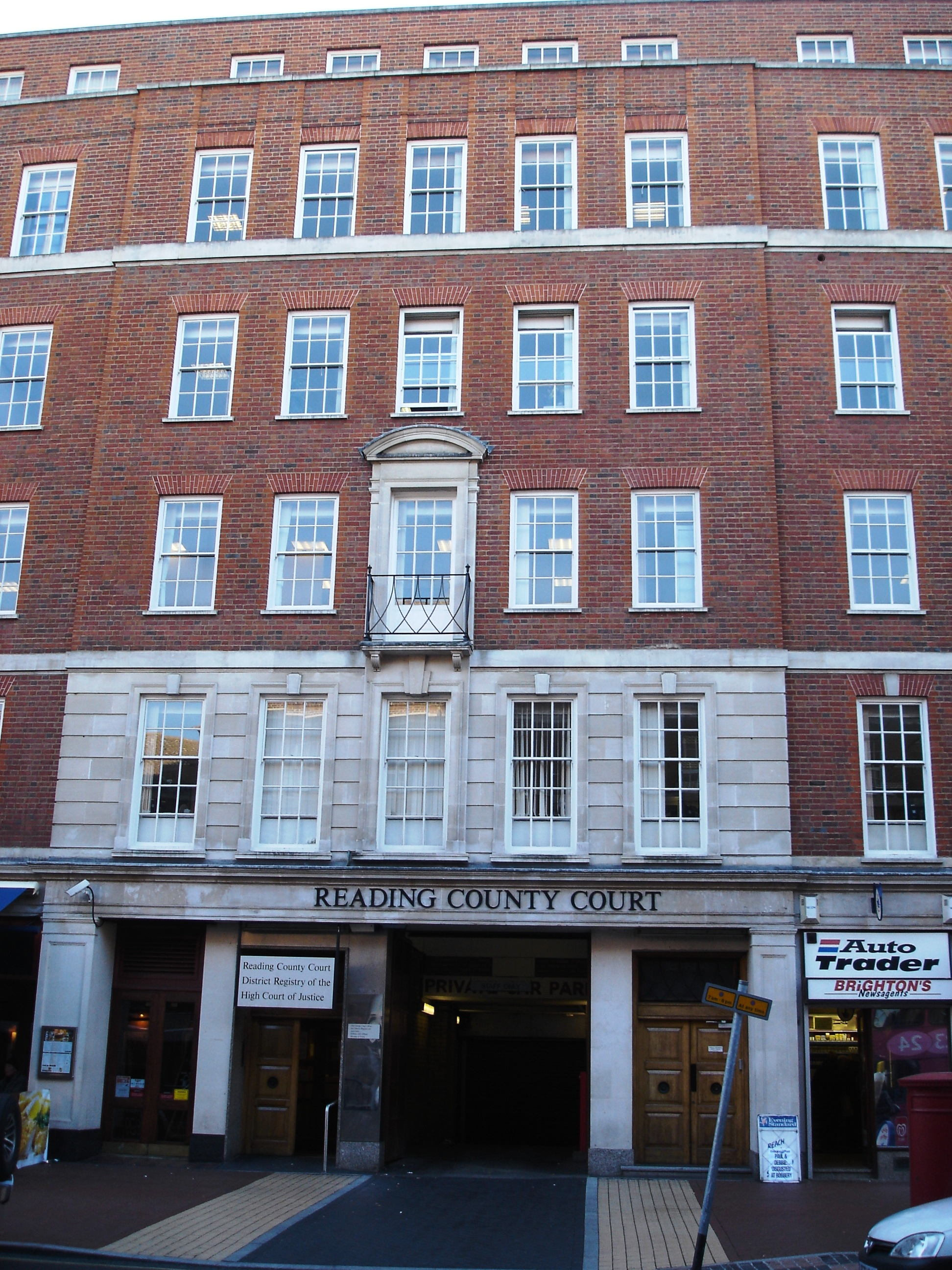
Reading County Court. An assured tenancy that is not shorthold provides the tenant with the option of holding over at its end, implying a statutory periodic tenancy, which calls on the landlord to obtain an order for possession to evict if the landlord has a valid statutory ground.

An assured tenancy is a legal category of residential tenancy to an individual (or individuals jointly) in English land law. Statute affords a tenant under an assured tenancy a degree of security of tenure. A tenant under an assured tenancy may not be evicted without a reasonable ground in the Housing Act 1988 and, where periodic (Note: As opposed to fixed term; and without any specified end date, but not a statutory periodic tenancy which is the relationship imputed (implied) after a fixed term tenancy has ended (see tenancy at will)) changes in rent are potentially subject to a challenge before a rent assessment committee.

Assured tenancies were introduced by the Housing Act 1988 that applies to tenancies entered from its commencement date or those assured tenancies it converted from the Housing Act 1980. The Act replaced most of the greater rent protection under the Rent Act 1977 and in rarer cases, other Rent Acts. (Note: The Rent Act 1977 was enacted under the Labour Government 1974–1979 and provided more extensive, administratively burdensome rental assessments.) However, since 28 February 1997, all new residential tenancies with three exceptions are deemed to be assured shorthold tenancies. These exceptions are those excluded by notice before or after the tenancy, those specifying it is not a shorthold, and lettings to existing assured tenants.

The assured tenancy replaced the secure tenancy, with greater tenant protections, introduced by the Housing Act 1980.

== Non-assured (or assured shorthold) tenancies ==
=== Tenancies entered into before the commencement of the 1988 Act on 15 January 1989 ===
An exception to this are assured tenancies which are converted from being regulated by the Housing Act 1980 (except if granted by approved bodies under ss56-68 of the Housing Act 1980 before 15 January 1989, and before that date the tenant made an application to the court under section 24 of the Landlord and Tenant Act 1954 (for the grant of a new tenancy), and on 15 January 1989 the 1980 Act tenancy is continuing by virtue of that section or of any provision of Part IV of the said Act of 1954.)

=== Tenancies not of a separate dwelling house ===
The term seemingly denoting "home", dwelling house, has been held to apply widely by the Courts, to exclude only businesses and highly indistinct factual arrangements of accommodation within a house or a flat (where the home is shared in an esoteric manner and no particular tenant or set of joint tenants can be said to be entitled exclusively the whole of any one part and anti-exclusion case law does not operate); flats and single rooms are included within the definition of a separate dwelling house as are converted barns, windmills etc.

=== High-value properties ===
Because domestic rates were abolished a distinction exists between tenancies granted before 1 April 1990 and those from that date. Before this a dwelling house (see above) tenancy with a rateable value of £750 (£1,500 in Greater London) (payable per year) cannot be an assured tenancy. From this date if the rent is more than £100,000 per year (£8,333.33 per month) it cannot be an assured tenancy.

=== Tenancies at a low rent ===
Similar for those tenancies before that date, if rent is less than two-thirds of the rateable value, or if after that date it does not exceed £250 per year (£1,000 per year in Greater London) it cannot be an assured tenancy.

=== Tenancies for agriculture, agricultural holdings, persons with Temporary Protection, under arrangements made for asylum seekers and their dependents, and family intervention tenancies ===
These detailed areas include a tenancy under which agricultural land, exceeding two acres, is let together with the dwelling-house.

=== Business tenancies ===
To be exact this excludes tenancies to which part II of the Landlord and Tenant Act 1954 applies. Tenancies eligible to be protected business tenancies (contracted out business tenancies) or partly let for business use are ineligible to be assured tenancies.

=== Educational body lettings to students ===
This does not apply to tenancies involving landlords other than the specified universities and colleges.

=== Holiday lettings ===
A letting for this purpose cannot be assured.

=== By live-in landlords ===
This applies where the landlord lives in another part of the same building in which the let accommodation is situated.

=== Crown, local authority and housing association lettings ===
Although these are excluded, lettings by local authorities and housing association may have other protections, such as secure tenancies under the Housing Act 1985.

=== In occupation as the principal home of the tenant ===
It is possible for a person to have more than one "home" in which case it is a legal question of fact as to whether a home is the principal home. Although this provision stipulates "occupation" this need not be continuous, if a mere temporary absence this will still be capable of being an assured tenancy.

=== If-and-so-long-as ===
Whether a tenancy is assured can vary depending on circumstances after the tenancy commencement. It may be that the tenant has not by eviction ceased to live in a tenancy in which case they are no longer occupying the dwelling as their principal home. Here the tenant thus loses security of tenure.

== Security of tenure ==
Tenancies that are "assured" are indefinite tenancies and do not have a term that is fixed. "Assured shorthold tenancies" unlike "assured" tenancies are for a fixed date term. Assured tenancies are rarely used by private residential landlords, however, they are commonly used by councils and housing associations.

If the tenancy is periodic, it will only come to an end either by an order of the court or by surrender by the tenant.

If the tenancy is a fixed-term tenancy, it may be ended either by the effluxion of time (Note: Contrast fixed-term non-contracted-out (notice-excluded and declared receipt of tenant acknowledged) Business Tenancies under Part II of the Landlord and Tenant Act 1954) automatically expiring, with no need to serve any notice, at the end of the fixed term or, if the tenancy agreement gives the landlord a power to end the tenancy, by the landlord exercising that power. If a fixed-term assured tenancy comes to an end in one of these ways but occupation continues, known as holding over, a periodic assured tenancy will from that event be created, known as a statutory periodic tenancy. Security of tenure remains.

In order to regain possession, the landlord may do so only on one of a number of statutory grounds, which are set out in Schedule 2 of the Housing Act 1988. To obtain an order for possession, the landlord must serve a section 8 notice on the tenant, setting out the ground or grounds that are relied on and then, after a period of time that varies depending on the grounds chosen, apply to the court for possession.

Unlawful eviction of a tenant is a criminal offence (under s1 of the Protection from Eviction Act 1977) unless the landlord reasonably believed the tenant was no longer in the premises, is sharing living accommodation with the tenant or is letting the property for holiday purposes.

== Increases of rent ==
Rent without specific provision under an assured, periodic tenancy cannot be increased within 52 weeks of commencement, and unless a statutory (implied) periodic tenancy, this may only be increased upon the service of a section 13 notice in the appropriate form for England or for Wales, however as with general contract law a historic lease amendment or new lease neglecting such a notice before such an increase accepted by the tenant will be deemed to have supervened, preventing the tenant from relying on an earlier contract in not serving a section 13 notice.

Naturally where fixed term and not periodic, and where a rent review clause exists in the periodic tenancy, contractual arrangements also avoid the need for the section 13 notice. The section 13 notice gives the right to the tenant to challenge the rent set under section 14 before a rent assessment committee where it is unreasonable that the market would charge such a rent, disregarding improvements performed by the tenant to the property where they were not obliged to carry these out.

== Comparison with assured shorthold tenancies ==
From 28 February 1997 most tenancies are deemed to be assured shorthold tenancies (ASTs) under which the landlord has an absolute right to possession where having served a notice on the tenant, before this date they had to be accompanied by a prescribed warning, fixed term, and for at least six months.

The only aspect of a shorthold which allows the tenant some control over the tenancy is the right of the tenant to refer the rent initially payable to a rent assessment committee, however it can reduce the rent only if it is "significantly higher" than the rents under other comparable assured shortholds. In this unusual scenario, the landlord can serve a notice before or after the tenancy has begun stating it is not to be a shorthold, where no rent assessment application has been made. In other regards, except security of tenure, as a subset of assured tenancies these follow the definition requirements of an assured tenancies.

== See also ==
- Assured shorthold tenancy
- Short assured tenancy (Scotland)
- English land law
- Rent regulation in England and Wales
