= Housing Act 1980 =

Act of the Parliament of the United Kingdom

Housing Act 1980 (Note: Section 155(1).)
- Act of Parliament
- Parliament of the United Kingdom
- Long title: An Act to give security of tenure, and the right to buy their homes, to tenants of local authorities and other bodies; to make other provision with respect to those and other tenants; to amend the law about housing finance in the public sector; to make other provision with respect to housing; to restrict the discretion of the court in making orders for possession of land; and for connected purposes.
- Citation: 1980 c. 51
- Territorial extent: England and Wales; Scotland (in part); Northern Ireland (in part); (Note: Section 155(2)–(3).)

Dates
- Royal assent: 8 August 1980
- Commencement: various (Note: Section 153.)
- Repealed: Scotland: 15 August 1987
Other legislation
Amends	Landlord and Tenant Act 1927; Rent Act 1977; Protection from Eviction Act 1977
Amended by	Senior Courts Act 1981; Matrimonial Homes Act 1983; Housing (Consequential Provisions) Act 1985; Commonhold and Leasehold Reform Act 2002
Repealed by	Scotland: Housing (Scotland) Act 1987

Status: Partially repealed

Text of statute as originally enacted

Text of the Housing Act 1980 as in force today (including any amendments) within the United Kingdom, from legislation.gov.uk.

Housing Act 1980

The Housing Act 1980 (c. 51) is an act of the Parliament of the United Kingdom that gave five million council house tenants in England and Wales the Right to Buy their house from their local authority. The Act came into force on 3 October 1980 and is seen as a defining policy of Thatcherism. In Scotland the Right to Buy was provided by the Tenants' Rights, Etc. (Scotland) Act 1980 and for Northern Ireland it was left to the Housing Executive.

== Background ==
Since the Housing and Town Planning Act 1919 the number of council houses had steadily risen for over fifty years and council tenants could only buy their home with the permission of their local authority. The Conservative party under Margaret Thatcher had promised in their manifesto for the general election of 1979 to give council house tenants the 'legal right to buy their homes'.

== Housing Act 1980 ==
The Housing Act 1980 came under Michael Heseltine's remit as he was Environment Secretary at the time. On proposing the bill to Parliament in 1979 Heseltine said it "lays the foundations for one of the most important social revolutions of this century". Gerald Kaufman, then in the Labour Party Shadow Cabinet and a former Environment Minister himself, said the Act would "not provide a single new home and [would] deprive many homeless people or families living in tower blocks from getting suitable accommodation".

The Labour Party was vehemently opposed to the Act but by the general election of 1987 had dropped its opposition to the Right to Buy. (Note: "For council tenants, we will maintain the right to buy. Local authorities, at present limited by the Tories in using the receipts from council house sales, will be required to use these proceeds to invest in new housing. For the millions who choose to remain council tenants, we will give a legal right to be consulted about rents, charges, repair and improvement programmes." Labour Manifesto 1987: Real Choice in Housing)

The Act allowed tenants who had lived in their homes for at least three years to buy at 33% discount of the market price and 44% for a flat. If one was a tenant for over 20 years they got a 50% discount. Those not allowed to buy were tenants of charitable housing associations.

However, many of the houses sold were built in the 1950s and 1960s, they were of poor quality and are today referred to as non-traditional housing, many had serious structural defects and were designated defective, the passing of the Housing Defects Act 1984 was required to allow for grants to be given to unsuspecting buyers, and to implement a cut off date for the issue of such grants.

As a result of increased building costs a further Housing Act 1988 was passed to limit the amount of money payable, and move some types of non-traditional housing into different categories, for different levels of grant.

Mortgage-interest tax relief was also in operation and the Act provided the right to a mortgage from the local authority. The Housing Act 1980 introduced the concept known as a 'secure tenancy' which restricted local authorities power to recover possession from their tenants. The Secretary of State had reserve powers to intervene with local authorities if they did not comply with the Act.

The Housing Act 1980 also gave those who paid a £100 deposit the right to buy their home at a fixed price in a period of two years after paying the deposit. If the tenant was to sell the home they bought under the Act within five years of purchasing it they would have to share the capital gain between themselves and the local authority.

== Right to Buy: Cost–benefit analysis ==
=== Growth in home ownership ===
Home ownership grew from 55% of the population in 1980 to 64% in 1987. By the time Margaret Thatcher left office in 1990 it was 67%. 1.5 million council houses were sold by 1990, by 1995 it was 2.1 million and as a result of the Right to Buy the Treasury received £28 billion. Proponents of the Right to Buy argue that it gave working-class council tenants opportunities to get on the property ladder which they would not otherwise had had without the Act. However, by 2021–23, home ownership had declined from a high of 70.9% in 2003 back to 65%.

=== One third of ex-council homes owned by wealthy landlords ===
Tony Belton, a Labour councillor in South West London claimed that, "Speculators have made millions out of exploiting public assets." In March 2013 the Daily Mirror reported that Charles Gow, the son of Mrs. Thatcher’s housing minister, Ian Gow, bought 40 of the 120 former council flats in one housing project in Roehampton, in South West London.

=== Rents soared in investor-owned ex-council flats ===
By 2013, some tenants who had purchased their council flats, sold them later to speculators, investors or property companies. By 2013, a one-bedroom council flat that sold for £50,000 in the early 1990s, for example, had a market price of £250,000. A tight housing market led to increased rent as construction of new homes decreased.

== Subsequent developments ==
The whole act was repealed for Scotland by section 339(3) of, and schedule 24 to, the Housing (Scotland) Act 1987, which came into force on 15 August 1987.

== See also ==
- Right to Buy
- Margaret Thatcher
