= Housing Act 1985 =

Act of the Parliament of the United Kingdom

Housing Act 1985 (Note: Section 625(1).)
- Act of Parliament
- Parliament of the United Kingdom
- Long title: An Act to consolidate the Housing Acts (except those provisions consolidated in the Housing Associations Act 1985 and the Landlord and Tenant Act 1985), and certain related provisions, with amendments to give effect to recommendations of the Law Commission.
- Citation: 1985 c. 68
- Territorial extent: England and Wales (Note: Section 625(3).)

Dates
- Royal assent: 30 October 1985
- Commencement: 1 April 1986 (Note: Section 625(2).)

Other legislation
- Amends: Restrictive Trade Practices Act 1976
- Amended by: Agricultural Holdings Act 1986; Building Societies Act 1986; Coal Industry Act 1987; Housing (Scotland) Act 1987; Landlord and Tenant Act 1987; Planning (Consequential Provisions) Act 1990; Statute Law (Repeals) Act 1993; Coal Industry Act 1994; Statute Law (Repeals) Act 1998; Countryside and Rights of Way Act 2000; Land Registration Act 2002; Commonhold and Leasehold Reform Act 2002; Charities Act 2011; Policing and Crime Act 2017; Digital Economy Act 2017; Sentencing Act 2020; Domestic Abuse Act 2021; Leasehold Reform (Ground Rent) Act 2022; Renters' Rights Act 2025
- Relates to: Housing Associations Act 1985; Landlord and Tenant Act 1985; Housing (Consequential Provisions) Act 1985

Status: Amended

Text of statute as originally enacted

Revised text of statute as amended

Text of the Housing Act 1985 as in force today (including any amendments) within the United Kingdom, from legislation.gov.uk.

The Housing Act 1985 (c. 68) is an act of the Parliament of the United Kingdom. The act introduced laws relating to the succession of council houses. It also facilitated the transfer of council housing to not-for-profit housing associations.

== Selected contents ==
=== Power to acquire land and buildings ===
Section 17 authorises local housing authorities to acquire land and buildings for housing construction and for housing use.

Cornwall Council argued in 2012, unsuccessfully, that the words "at a reasonable price" were implied by the wording of this section. The Council wanted to annul certain leases entered into by two predecessor local authorities because they considered the costs excessive and not to have been agreed by reference to local market rents, but the Court of Appeal said that such words or legal intent were not implied by the act.

=== Overcrowding ===
Sections 324-326 replicate part 10 of the Housing Act 1935, referring to a "room standard" (section 325) and a "space standard" (section 326) as means by which to control "statutory overcrowding". A breach of these standards is a criminal offence.

Table 1 maximum people per allowed room
No. of rooms	No. of people
1	2
2	3
3	5
4	7 1/2
5 or more	2 for each room

Table 2 Minimum room size per person
Floor area of room	No. of people
110 sq. ft. (10.22m^{2})	2
90 ‒ 110 sq. ft. (8.36 ‒ 10.22m^{2})	1 1/2
70 ‒ 90 sq. ft. (6.5 ‒ 8.36m^{2})	1
50 ‒ 70 sq. ft. (4.65 ‒ 6.5m^{2})	1/2

A child under 10 is counted as one half of a person.

=== Section 610 ===
Section 610 provides a power for the County Court to vary the terms of a lease or a restrictive covenant to allow for conversion of a single dwelling into two or more dwellings, where either the lease or the restrictive covenant would prohibit such a conversion. The power can be exercised where local housing need and demand has changed since the dwelling was built, or where planning permission for the conversion has been granted, and after consultation with "any person interested" in the matter. The use of this mechanism to facilitate change in residential property usage offers an alternative to the use of section 84 of the Law of Property Act 1925, which (in its amended form) provides for circumstances in which the Lands Tribunal can discharge or revise a restrictive covenant. The use of section 610 was reviewed in the Appeal Court case of Lawntown v Camenzuli in 2007, where Lord Justice Richards noted that there had been relatively few reported legal cases where interpretation of the section had been raised.

== See also ==
- English land law
- Housing Act 1980
- Public housing in the United Kingdom § Stock transfer

== Bibliography ==
- Park, Julia. "One hundred years of space standards" (PDF). Housing Space Standards.
