= Assured shorthold tenancy =

Default legal category

The assured shorthold tenancy (AST) was the default legal category of residential tenancy in England and Wales from the 1990s to the 2020s.

It was a form of assured tenancy with limited security of tenure, which was introduced by the Housing Act 1988 (Note: Commenced 15 January 1989) and saw an important default provision and a widening of its definition made by the Housing Act 1996. (Note: Commenced 28 February 1997) Since 28 February 1997 in respect of accommodation to new tenants who are new to their landlords, the assured shorthold tenancy became the most common form of arrangement that involves a private residential landlord. The equivalent in Scotland is short assured tenancy.

Assured shorthold tenancies in Wales were replaced with occupation contracts in 2022, under the Renting Homes (Wales) Act 2016, and in England were converted to assured periodic tenancies on 1 May 2026, except for those under possession proceedings.

== Requirements ==
The tenancy must have met the basic requirements of an assured tenancy (excluding the security of tenure effects) and all of the following:

1. Any of the following:
  1. The tenancy started between 15 January 1989 and 27 January 1997 (inclusive) and was accompanied by a prescribed warning, was for a fixed term, and for at least six months
  2. The tenancy started at or after 28 February 1997
2. The tenancy is not excluded by a notice stating it is not a shorthold tenancy before or after the tenancy
3. The tenancy does not specify within it that it is not a shorthold tenancy
4. The tenancy is not a letting to an existing assured tenant of the landlord's, whether for the same premises or not (and whether to that tenant alone or part of a group) (Note: Anti-avoidance provision to prevent continuing secured tenants from losing their security of tenure)

== Security of tenure ==
The landlord had the right to terminate:

- by using a Section 21 notice, which in practice results in a minimum notice period of two months. Since the Housing Act 1996, there is no minimum length for which an assured shorthold tenancy may be granted and a Section 21 notice can be served at any time. The exception being to tenancies in England that began on or after 1 October 2015; where a Section 21 notice cannot be served for the first four months of the tenancy. However, when court proceedings are based on the Section 21 notice the court cannot order the tenant to give up possession earlier than six months from the beginning of the tenancy. Where one assured shorthold tenancy follows another, the tenant is protected for only 6 months from the beginning of the first tenancy under which the premises were occupied. A Section 21 notice may not be issued unless the tenancy deposit registration requirements were met within 30 days of the deposit payment.
- At any time on any of the ordinary assured grounds should this be satisfied using a Section 8 notice under the Housing Act 1988. In most cases, if a Section 8 notice is served 14 days' notice must be given in order for the notice to be valid.

In 2023, the Conservative Government introduced the Renters' Reform Bill to abolish Section 21 no-fault evictions and improve tenants’ rights across England and Wales. A new Renters' Rights Bill for England was introduced by the Labour Government in 2024 with similar aims. The Renters' Rights Act 2025 received Royal Assent on 27 October 2025. When it comes into force, the Act will abolish assured shorthold tenancies entirely. All existing ASTs will convert to periodic assured tenancies, meaning tenants can remain indefinitely unless the landlord uses one of the reformed Section 8 grounds for possession. The Act also abolishes Section 21 'no-fault' evictions, introduces a new Decent Homes Standard for the private rented sector, and limits rent increases to once per year.

== Comparison with assured tenancy ==
The only potential landlord's disadvantage of the assured shorthold tenancy was the right of the tenant to refer the rent initially payable to a rent assessment committee; which is now called the First-tier Tribunal (Property Chamber – Residential Property). However, it can reduce the rent only if it is "significantly higher" than the rents under any other comparable AST. In this unusual scenario in which the landlord has been able to agree a rent substantially higher than market comparables of the same kind of accommodation, the landlord can serve a Section 21 notice before or after the tenancy has begun stating it is not to be an assured shorthold tenancy, where no rent assessment application has been made. In other regards, except security of tenure, as a subset of assured tenancies, ASTs follow the definition requirements of assured tenancies, e.g. which includes maximum and minimum rent levels to exclude the most unusual extremes.

== See also ==
- Buy to let

== Notes and references ==
Notes
