= Protection from Eviction Act 1977 =

Act of the Parliament of the United Kingdom

Protection from Eviction Act 1977 (Note: Section 13(1).)
- Act of Parliament
- Parliament of the United Kingdom
- Long title: An Act to consolidate section 16 of the Rent Act 1957 and Part III of the Rent Act 1965, and related enactments.
- Citation: 1977 c. 43
- Territorial extent: England and Wales (Note: Section 13(3).)

Dates
- Royal assent: 29 July 1977
- Commencement: 29 August 1977 (Note: Section 13(2).)

Other legislation
- Amends: Reserve and Auxiliary Forces (Protection of Civil Interests) Act 1951; Rent Act 1957; Caravan Sites Act 1968; See § Repealed enactments
- Repeals/revokes: See § Repealed enactments
- Amended by: Criminal Law Act 1977; Magistrates' Courts Act 1980; Housing Act 1980; Criminal Justice Act 1982; County Courts Act 1984; Agricultural Holdings Act 1986; Housing Act 1988; Local Government and Housing Act 1989; Local Government (Wales) Act 1994; Agricultural Tenancies Act 1995; Housing Act 1996 (Consequential Provisions) Order 1996; Government of Wales Act 1998; Immigration and Asylum Act 1999; Civil Partnership Act 2004; Immigration, Asylum and Nationality Act 2006; Housing and Regeneration Act 2008; Local Democracy, Economic Development and Construction Act 2009; Housing and Regeneration Act 2008 (Consequential Provisions) Order 2010; Localism Act 2011; Crime and Courts Act 2013; Transfer of Tribunal Functions Order 2013; Immigration Act 2016; Policing and Crime Act 2017; Immigration, Nationality and Asylum (EU Exit) Regulations 2019; Renting Homes (Wales) Act 2016 (Consequential Amendments) Regulations 2022; Levelling-up and Regeneration Act 2023; Renters' Rights Act 2025
- Relates to: Rent Act 1977

Status: Amended

Text of statute as originally enacted

Revised text of statute as amended

Text of the Protection from Eviction Act 1977 as in force today (including any amendments) within the United Kingdom, from legislation.gov.uk.

The Protection from Eviction Act 1977 (c. 43) is an act of the Parliament of the United Kingdom protecting people renting accommodation from losing their homes without the involvement of a court.

== Provisions ==
The act aims to protect tenants from being ejected from their homes by landlords unless a court order exists. Lodgers however can be evicted without a court order.

Section 3 states that no tenant can be forcibly evicted without a court order. The purpose of this section was to prevent aggressive landlords from becoming violent.

Section 3A states that there are a number of exclusions. These are primarily when a landlord resides in the same property as the tenant, or the accommodation falls within the definition of a hostel or hotel.

Section 5 states that everyone classified as having a lease or a licence, must be given four weeks' notice before they are evicted. Any "notice to quit" has no effect before this time unless there has been a breach of the license conditions. The license should state the minimum period in cases of breach, but this is commonly only 7 days notice by the licensor.

=== Repealed enactments ===
Section 12(3) of the act repealed 8 enactments, listed in schedule 3 to the act.

Enactments repealed by section 12(3)
Citation	Short title	Extent of repeal
5 & 6 Eliz. 2. c. 25	Rent Act 1957	Section 16.
1965 c. 75	Rent Act 1965	The whole act, so far as unrepealed.
1968 c. 23	Rent Act 1968	In section 108(2), the words "or under Part III of the Rent Act 1965".
1968 c. 23	Rent Act 1968	In section 109(3), the words "or Part III of the Rent Act 1965 (protection against harassment)".
1968 c. 23	Rent Act 1968	In Schedule 15, the entries relating to sections 32 and 34 of the Rent Act 1965.
1970 c. 40	Agriculture Act 1970	Section 99.
1972 c. 47	Housing Finance Act 1972	In Schedule 9, paragraph 12(2) and in paragraph 12(3) the words "or to Part III of the Rent Act 1965".
1972 c. 71	Criminal Justice Act 1972	Section 30.
1974 c. 44	Housing Act 1974	Section 123.
1976 c. 80	Rent (Agriculture) Act 1976	In Schedule 8, paragraphs 13, 14 and 15.

== Failure to respect the act ==
Police have frequently failed to intervene when tenants were forceably removed from their homes without a court order or when tenants' property was removed from their homes and locks changed without a court order. Shelter maintain that in 2016 nearly 50,000 tenants had their belongings removed, and the locks changed by landlords. Over 200,000 tenants were harassed by their landlord and some 600,000 had their landlord enter their home without permission. Police wrongly believe these are civil matters and police need better training in the law. Eviction of tenants (but not licensees) without a court order is a criminal offence under section 1 of the Protection from Eviction Act 1977.

== See also ==
- English land law
- English property law
- Landlord and Tenant Act 1985
