= Housing Act 1988 =

Act of the Parliament of the United Kingdom

Housing Act 1988 (Note: Section 141(1).)
- Act of Parliament
- Parliament of the United Kingdom
- Long title: An Act to make further provision with respect to dwelling-houses let on tenancies or occupied under licences; to amend the Rent Act 1977 and the Rent (Agriculture) Act 1976; to establish a body, Housing for Wales, having functions relating to housing associations; to amend the Housing Associations Act 1985 and to repeal and re-enact with amendments certain provisions of Part II of that Act; to make provision for the establishment of housing action trusts for areas designated by the Secretary of State; to confer on persons approved for the purpose the right to acquire from public sector landlords certain dwelling-houses occupied by secure tenants; to make further provision about rent officers, the administration of housing benefit and rent allowance subsidy, the right to buy, repair notices and certain disposals of land and the application of capital money arising thereon; to make provision consequential upon the Housing (Scotland) Act 1988; and for connected purposes.
- Citation: 1988 c. 50
- Territorial extent: England and Wales; Scotland; (Note: Section 141(5)–(6).)

Dates
- Royal assent: 15 November 1988
- Commencement: various (Note: Section 141(2)–(4).)
Other legislation
Amends	Reserve and Auxiliary Forces (Protection of Civil Interests) Act 1951; Rent Act 1977; Protection from Eviction Act 1977; County Courts Act 1984; Housing Associations Act 1985; Housing Act 1985; Access to Personal Files Act 1987; Housing (Scotland) Act 1988
Amended by	Planning (Consequential Provisions) Act 1990; Social Security (Consequential Provisions) Act 1992; Coal Industry Act 1994; Drug Trafficking Act 1994; Employment Tribunals Act 1996; Employment Rights Act 1996; Trusts of Land and Appointment of Trustees Act 1996; Housing Act 1996; Justices of the Peace Act 1997; Government of Wales Act 1998; Statute Law (Repeals) Act 1998; Land Registration Act 2002; Statute Law (Repeals) Act 2004; Housing and Regeneration Act 2008; Postal Services Act 2011; Policing and Crime Act 2017; Sentencing Act 2020; Renters' Rights Act 2025

Status: Amended

Text of statute as originally enacted

Revised text of statute as amended

Text of the Housing Act 1988 as in force today (including any amendments) within the United Kingdom, from legislation.gov.uk.

The Housing Act 1988 (c. 50) is an act of the Parliament of the United Kingdom. It governs the law between landlords and tenants. The act introduced the concepts of assured tenancy and assured shorthold tenancy. It also facilitated the transfer of council housing to not-for-profit housing associations, which was then carried out partly through the system of Large Scale Voluntary Transfer. Section 21 of the Act, which allowed landlords to recover possession without stating a reason, was abolished on 1 May 2026 under the Renters' Rights Act 2025.

== History ==
Under the system of protected and statutory tenancies, tenants had the right to stay in a landlord's property almost indefinitely and pass the tenancy down to relatives. The difficulties landlords could face in trying to regain possession of their property created disincentives to owners' letting properties, which along with the fact that most council houses had been sold caused a housing shortage.

In 1979, a Conservative government headed by Margaret Thatcher was elected. Thatcher sought to revamp the rented sector. At the time of the Housing Act 1988's enactment, the private rented sector accounted for less than 8 percent of homes in Britain, down from 76 percent in 1918, while social housing was about 30 percent.

The Department of the Environment's 1987 white paper Housing: the Government's Proposals set out goals of reversing the decline in rented housing and improving its quality; giving council tenants the right to transfer to other landlords if they so desired; targeting money more accurately on the most acute problems; and encouraging the growth of home ownership. According to the white paper, public housing authorities had failed to adequately accommodate the wishes of tenants, causing resentment and lack of tenant commitment to their homes; the government sought to alleviate this by giving tenants greater consumer choice, which would be accomplished by offering a variety of forms of ownership and management. Council tenants would be given the right to buy, and private landlords' rights would be strengthened.

Specifically, under the new law, in contrast to the old fair rents system, landlords were allowed to charge whatever they liked, with only two exceptions. Rent could be challenged by assured shorthold tenants during the first six months of the tenancy, if a tenant believed his rent was more than the current market rent for his property, in which case he could refer the rent to the Rent Assessment Panel for review. However, few would want to do this, given landlords' right to give a section 21 notice and end the tenancy. Tenants could also challenge the rent upon service of an annual notice to increase rent at the end of the fixed term; but landlords could avoid this by increasing the rent via a renewal tenancy agreement.

The Housing Act also provided for two types of tenancy, the "assured" tenancy and the "assured shorthold tenancy". The latter is preferred by most private sector landlords, as it gives them the right to end the tenancy at any time after service of a section 21 notice. However, the Renters' Rights Act 2025 will abolish Section 21 evictions from 1 May 2026. Typically, in a situation where there is a private landlord and a tenancy that began on or after 28 February 1997, and in which the house or flat is let as separate accommodation and is the tenant's main home, the property is being let on an assured shorthold tenancy.

== Contents ==
The Housing Act 1988 dramatically changed three main areas of English property law in particular, namely: rent regulation, succession and security of tenure. The Housing Act 1988 significantly reduced rent regulation, giving landlords the opportunity to charge whatever they liked for a property (something that is still the case today, despite growing calls from some for the return of rent controls of some description). The change also meant that the only party with the right to challenge the prices set by landlords are their tenants. There are only certain circumstances in which tenants may challenge the rent, which are during the first six months of an assured shorthold tenancy or upon service of a notice to increase rent, which can be used by landlords on an annual basis to raise the rent after the fixed term has come to an end.

Tenants who believe their rent is higher than the current market value can, in the first six months of an assured shorthold tenancy, refer their case to a rent assessment panel (an independent decision-making body sometimes known as a rent assessment committee or rent assessment tribunal) for review. Most tenants, however, are unlikely to take this step in light of the power of the landlord to end the tenancy in accordance with section 21 of the Housing Act 1988. What’s more, landlords now have the ability to increase rents without using the notice procedure, opting instead to do so via a ‘renewal’ tenancy agreement. The changes to rent regulation mean that tenants’ rights to challenge landlords over rent – outlined above – have less sway over landlords and are, as a result, used less frequently. The amendments made as part of the Housing Act, and the rebalancing of power this caused, are one of the major reasons rental prices have grown so rapidly since the late 1980s.

As a result of the Housing Act 1988, the rules regarding succession became similar to those under the Rent Act, whereby only a spouse can inherit rental rights. The changes to the succession laws directly impact very few landlords – mostly because assured tenancies, which state that only a spouse can inherit rental rights, are uncommon in the private rental sector. Under assured shorthold tenancies, which also came into force in the late 1980s and now make up most tenancies in the private rental sector, there are no rights of succession. In other words, if the tenant dies, the spouse or other beneficiary has no right to remain in the property. With this type of tenancy, succession rights have become irrelevant precisely because the landlord now has the power to serve a section 21 notice to evict the tenant through the courts.

== See also ==
- English land law
- Housing Act 1985
- Public housing in the United Kingdom § Stock transfer
