= History of rent control in England and Wales =

The history of rent control in England and Wales is a part of English land law concerning the development of rent regulation in England and Wales. Controlling the prices that landlords could make their tenants pay formed the main element of rent regulation, and was in place from 1915 until its abolition (excluding some council houses) by the Housing Act 1988.

There have been significant changes in attitudes and legislation toward the right to housing in mainland Britain. Concepts, such as rent control, 'security of tenure', statutory tenancy, regulated tenancy, fair rent, rent officer, Rent Officer Service and assured tenancy were introduced in the twentieth century, and have developed in the years since. It concerns the intervention of public law rights in private relations between landlord and tenant, and was put in place to counteract the inequality of bargaining power between landlords and tenants.

== 1915 to 1939 ==
Rent control and security of tenure were first introduced on 23 December 1915 with the Increase of Rent and Mortgage Interest (War Restrictions) Act 1915 (5 & 6 Geo. 5. c. 97) and were intended to be temporary measures (due to expire six months after the end of the First World War) to deal with excessive increases in rents caused by the wartime housing shortage due to the cessation of building.

The act attempted to remedy this evil by restricting the right of landlords to eject their tenants and prevented them from raising the rent except for limited purposes. At the same time, in fairness to the landlords, mortgagees of houses controlled by the act were prevented from increasing the rate of interest and restricted in their rights to enforce the security. This was the first comprehensive European enactment controlling rent; since then many other acts have been passed in Great Britain, and of course, in other European countries.

Before the Increase of Rent and Mortgage Interest (War Restrictions) Act 1915, the relationship between landlord and tenant had been purely contractual; at the expiration or termination of the contract, the landlord could recover possession.

=== Scope of control ===
The new form of control was relatively simple and inflexible. The act applied to separate dwellings with rateable values or standard rents not exceeding £35 in London, £30 in Scotland and £26 elsewhere.

Specifically excluded were:

- dwellings let with land other than a garden or let with other premises;
- lettings at a rent of less than two-thirds the rateable value;
- lettings where the rent included payment for board, attendance or furniture.

==== Standard rent ====
The controlled rent was known as the standard rent. It was the rent of a letting on 3 August 1914; or, where there was no letting on that date, the rent the dwelling had last been let for before that date; or, in the case of a first letting after 3 August 1914, the rent at which it was first let.

==== Security of tenure ====
Under the provisions of the act, a tenant who paid the rent and observed other conditions of the tenancy, could only be evicted if the landlord could satisfy the courts on certain grounds specified in the act.

These were:

- that the tenant had committed waste or caused nuisance or annoyance to neighbours; or,
- that the premises were reasonably required by the landlord for his own occupation, or that of an employee.

In addition, the courts could grant possession on any other ground it considered satisfactory.

==== Premiums ====
After 25 November 1915, premiums were not allowed to be paid by a tenant on the grant, renewal or continuance of any tenancy. Any amount paid was recoverable unless it was made payable by an agreement entered into before 4 August 1914. (Leases for 21 years or more were later excluded by the Courts (Emergency Powers) Act 1917).

==== Rates ====
The Statement of Rates Act 1919 (9 & 10 Geo. 5. c. 31) required any owner in England and Wales who received rent that included rates to show the amount in the rent book. The equivalent Scottish act was the House-Letting and Rating (Scotland) Act 1920 (10 & 11 Geo. 5. c. 8).

Further extensions and amendments to the Increase of Rent and Mortgage Interest (War Restrictions) Act 1915 were made the Courts (Emergency Powers) Act 1917 (7 & 8 Geo. 5. c. 25), the Increase of Rent, &c. (Amendment) Act 1918 (8 & 9 Geo. 5. c. 7), the Increase of Rent and Mortgage Interest (Restrictions) Act 1919 (9 & 10 Geo. 5. c. 7) and the Increase of Rent, &c. (Amendment) Act 1919 (9 & 10 Geo. 5. c. 90). Control was exempted from houses built alter 2 April 1919 or in process of construction at that date.

Rent control and security of tenure hardly proved to be such temporary measures as had been originally intended.

=== Full control 1920 to 1923 ===
Following the report of the Salisbury Committee into the continuing deterioration in the housing supply, the Increase of Rent and Mortgage Interest (Restrictions) Act 1920 (10 & 11 Geo. 5. c. 17) was passed, which consolidated and amended the earlier legislation. Most of the provisions were intended to be for a period of three years but they were successively extended and amended.

Any remaining provisions were repealed and consolidated by the Rent Act 1968 and in Scotland by the Rent (Scotland) Act 1971. The 1920 act is still the foundation of the modern law; most concepts of the Rent Acts are derived from it. It is suggested as a first source of reference for any original concepts which are not included in this brief summary.

==== Scope of control ====
The standard rent and rateable value limits were increased to £105 in London, £90 in Scotland and £78 elsewhere, and so applied to the great majority of let houses in the country. The concept of "statutory tenant" was introduced in this act. Premises used for business, trade or professional purposes, or for the public service were brought within the act for one year (with slightly different percentage increases to those outlined below for dwellings). New dwellings continued to be excluded from control.

The Increase of Rent and Mortgage Interest (Restrictions) Act 1920 did not apply to houses erected, or in the course of erection, on 2 April 1919, nor to those that at that date or later were being reconstructed into two or more separate and self-contained flats or tenements.

A measure of control was introduced for the first time to a furnished letting of a dwelling covered by the act. This control related to abnormal or excessive profits. In the latter case, the landlord was liable to a fine of up to £100.

==== Standard rent ====
The Increase of Rent and Mortgage Interest (Restrictions) Act 1920 allowed increases in rent of up to 40% and in mortgage interest of 1% (up to a maximum of six and one half per cent). The 40% was made up of two elements. An increase of 15% was allowed, to compensate the landlord for the fall in the value of money during the Great War. A further increase in rent of 25% was allowed to cover expenditure on repairs where the landlord did the repairs. This latter increase could not be levied on tenants of unfit dwellings or dwellings in disrepair. In fact, it could be levied but the tenant (or the sanitary authority) could go to court to have it suspended until the repairs had been carried out.

Increases were also permitted, as a percentage of the relevant expenditure, following improvement or structural alteration. A tenant of a furnished dwelling was able to go to a county court (in Scotland a sheriff court) for an order to freeze the rent at a specified level and for repayment of any rent already paid in excess of that level.

==== Premiums ====
The act now made it a penal offence, liable to a fine of £100, to require a premium, but reduced the length of excluded tenancies from 21 years or more to 14 years or more.

==== Security of tenure ====
Distress (in Scotland "diligence") could only be levied with consent of the court. Possession could be recovered if the court saw fit on a certain number of grounds, which were widened. The court lost its powers to grant possession on some unspecified but less satisfactory grounds.

==== Succession ====
There was a right of succession by the tenant's widow if she was residing with him at his death or a member of the tenant's family who had been residing with the tenant at the time of his death. A requirement for six months' residence except for a widow was introduced by the Rent and Mortgage Interest Restrictions (Amendment) Act 1933.

=== Gradual decontrol 1923 to 1933 ===
Following the report of the Onslow Committee, the Rent and Mortgage Interest Restrictions Act 1923 (13 & 14 Geo. 5. c. 32) became the first measure to reverse the machinery of control.

==== Scope of decontrol ====
Premises came out of protection when tenants died or moved away. Sitting tenants remained controlled. The acts ceased to apply to premises for which a lease or tenancy of not less than two years' duration was granted to a sitting tenant. It extended the grounds for recovery of possession.

==== Furnished tenancies ====
As has been said earlier, the Increase of Rent and Mortgage Interest (War Restrictions) Act 1915 had disapplied the act where board, attendance, or furniture was provided. The Rent and Mortgage Interest Restrictions Act 1923 now quantified the amount of attendance or provided furniture so that only substantial provision in rental terms would take the letting out of control. In other words, the value of attendance (personal services provided to the tenant) or the value of the furniture had to form a substantial part of the rental value.

Subsequent legislation made minor amendments to previous enactments, and the Expiring Laws Continuance Acts 1927-1932 ensured continuity of the Rent Acts until 1933.

== Gradual decontrol 1933 ==
The recommendations of the Marley Committee in 1931 were implemented in the Rent and Mortgage Interest Restrictions (Amendment) Act 1933 (23 & 24 Geo. 5. c. 32).

They had reported that the gradual decontrol inaugurated by the Rent and Mortgage Interest Restrictions Act 1923 had worked satisfactorily with regard to the medium-sized houses, but too slowly to the largest and too quickly to the smallest. So the 1933 act divided the dwellings the acts applied to into three categories.

=== Scope of decontrol ===
The larger houses became decontrolled where both the annual recoverable rent and the rateable value exceeded £45 in London and Scotland and £35 elsewhere.

The middle group comprised all existing controlled houses where the rateable value exceeded £20 in London £25 and 5 shillings in Scotland and £13 elsewhere. These became subject to decontrol by the Rent and Mortgage Interest Restrictions Act 1923 when the landlord obtained vacant possession or granted a new minimum period two-year lease or tenancy.

The remaining controlled houses, the smallest houses, were those with rateable values not exceeding £20/£25.25/£13 as above. These could not become decontrolled piecemeal but were to remain controlled until the Rent Acts expired. If a house within these rateable value limits had become decontrolled under the Rent and Mortgage Interest Restrictions Act 1923 it was not automatically brought back into control by the Rent and Mortgage Interest Restrictions (Amendment) Act 1933. It could remain decontrolled provided the landlord registered it as decontrolled within three months of the enactment of the 1933 act.

Rents could be increased by a percentage of the relevant expenditure to reflect the provision of additional or improved fixtures or fittings made after enactment of the 1933 act.

A tenant of a dwelling that had become decontrolled by this act had to be served one month's notice that the possession would be required on the date specified in the notice unless a new tenancy had been negotiated before the notice ran out.

=== Succession ===
As has been mentioned above, the right of succession granted in the Increase of Rent and Mortgage Interest (Restrictions) Act 1920 now required six months' residence except for a widow. A widower could also succeed to the tenancy as a member of his deceased wife's family provided that the six months' test was satisfied.

=== Suitable alternative accommodation ===
The act also added new grounds for recovery of possession by a landlord (e.g. suitable alternative accommodation being available now became a sufficient ground for the recovery of possession).

A second attempt (the first had been made in the Increase of Rent, &c. (Amendment) Act 1919) was made to prevent a tenant from charging an excessive rent on sub-letting part of the premises. Matters were certainly becoming more complicated.

=== More decontrol 1938 ===
After yet another report, this one by Viscount Ridley's Committee, the Increase of Rent and Mortgage Interest (Restrictions) Act 1938 (1 & 2 Geo. 6. c. 26) was introduced.

==== Scope of decontrol ====
The 1938 act automatically decontrolled all the more valuable houses in the middle value band (i.e., houses that exceeded £35 in London and Scotland and £20 elsewhere) and prevented any further creeping decontrol (introduced by the Rent and Mortgage Interest Restrictions Act 1923) of the lower range of houses in the middle-value band).

The 1938 act did not reintroduce control of a house in the middle-value band that the Rent and Mortgage Interest Restrictions (Amendment) Act 1933 had decontrolled, but the landlord had to get it registered as decontrolled within three months.

Failure on the part of the landlord to meet the three-month deadline meant that the houses were deemed to be still controlled, unless the courts excused his failure to do so within one year from the passing of the act.

For the first time, in defining the application of the act, there was no reference to rent limits. Because rateable values were now the sole criterion for the continued applicability of the acts, the result was decontrol of a large number of houses where the recoverable rent would have kept them in control.

== 1939 to 1945 ==
=== Full control again 1939 to 1945 ===
Just when it must have seemed that the end of control was in sight, the threat of war revived fears of the excessive rent increases that led to the initial introduction of control in 1915, the Rent and Mortgage Interest Restrictions Act 1939 was introduced.

=== Scope of control ===
All dwellings not already subject to control, and with rateable values that did not exceed £100 in London, £90 in Scotland and £75 elsewhere were brought back into control.

It also brought to an end the creeping decontrol under the Rent and Mortgage Interest Restrictions (Amendment) Act 1933 (whereby the landlord had been able to obtain vacant possession or decontrol had come about by the grant of a two-year lease or tenancy). The form of control introduced for the newly controlled dwellings differed from that previously in existence and they became "new control" and "old control" respectively. The distinction is no longer of importance, now that "control" has been replaced by "regulation". For the first time local authority dwellings were excluded from control.

Like its First World War predecessor, the Second World War legislation was only intended to continue in force "the principal Acts" until six months after the emergency ended. These were the Rent and Mortgage Interest Restrictions Acts 1920 - 1938 and were due to expire in 1942. The Order in Council that should have declared the end of the emergency was never made, and the acts, as amended, continued in force until 1968 (1971 in Scotland).

== 1945 to 1957 ==
=== The post-war period ===
In the aftermath of wartime bomb damage, shortage of materials and building restrictions, the increased demand for homes from those returning from the conflict resulted in housing shortages that continued into the next decade. No attempt was made to introduce any form of rent decontrol.

The Building Materials and Housing Act 1945, which was passed on 20 December 1945, limited selling and letting prices for certain houses.

The act increased the amount of loan Treasury could raise under the Housing (Temporary Accommodation) Act 1944 to £200 million. Local authorities were enabled to grant loans to acquire or construct homes costing up to £1,500 each.

==== Permitted rent ====
A house or a flat constructed under building licence under the Defence Regulations made under the Emergency Powers (Defence) Acts 1939-1945 could be subject to a condition limiting the price for sale or rent (the "permitted rent").

The 1945 act imposed a time limit of four years (subsequently raised in 1949 to eight years) during which a breach of the limit rendered the transgressor liable to a fine up to the aggregate of:-

a) the financial gain from the offence;
b) a fine of £100; or
c) imprisonment for up to three months, or to both a fine and imprisonment.

==== Furnished lettings ====
A second committee set up in 1943 under Viscount Ridley to review the working of the rent restriction acts formed a very favourable opinion of the Rent of Furnished Houses Control (Scotland) Act 1943 and recommended that England and Wales should follow suit. The Furnished Houses (Rent Control) Act 1946 established a separate system of protection—modelled on Scottish legislation that involved rent tribunals setting reasonable rents—for contracts referred to them for furnished lettings. Previously these had not been subject to any effective control under the Rent Acts.

==== Scope of control ====
Initially, the 1943 and 1946 acts applied, irrespective of the dwelling's rateable value or the rent. ln England and Wales, local authorities were required to keep registers of the rents so determined (registers were maintained by the tribunals themselves in Scotland).

This system was quite separate from the general rules as to control under the principal acts.

==== Furniture ====
The rent had to include payment for the use of furniture or for services (which included attendance and any other privilege such as the right to a cycle storage space). The provision of board (but only if it formed a substantial part of the rent) took the letting outside the jurisdiction of the Rent Tribunal.

Both the 1943 and 1946 acts were temporary measures but were continued in force by successive Expiring Laws Continuation Acts. In 1974 the 1946 act principles were re-deployed as the method of protecting the tenants of resident landlords. Both survive in the Rent Act 1977 and the Rent Act (Scotland) Act 1984.

==== Reasonable rents ====
The Landlord and Tenant (Rent Control) Act 1949 cured a number of defects in earlier acts and empowered rent tribunals to determine, upon application to them by either the landlord or the tenant, a reasonable rent for any dwelling-house to which the Rent Acts applied, which was first let after 1 September 1939. The rent so determined became the standard rent.

==== Security of tenure ====
This act gave rent tribunals the power to suspend the operation of a notice to quit for a successive periods of up to three months at a time. It also debarred an application to a rent tribunal for an extension of security of tenure for a furnished letting where the tribunal, on an earlier reference, had given less than the maximum statutory period of security.

==== Premiums ====
The 1949 act also extended to all tenancies of dwelling-houses to which the Rent Acts applied, the penalties relating to the payment of premiums, and hidden premiums in consideration of leases of up to fourteen years

==== Shared accommodation ====
It applied the provisions of the 1943 and 1946 Acts to contracts, for both furnished and unfurnished lettings, under which the tenant shared some living accommodation with the landlord. Where the tenant shared some living accommodation with persons other than the landlord, it applied the Rent Acts to the contract.

=== 1951 to 1956 ===
The Reserve and Auxiliary Forces (Protection of Civil Interests) Act 1951 (14 & 15 Geo. 6. c. 65) conferred on servicemen the same protection as that provided under the Rent Acts in cases where their tenancies were not already within those acts.

Incidentally, this act has been amended on several successive occasions whenever there has been an amendment to the protection given by the Rent Acts to ensure that servicemen would have a rented home to return to.

The Crown Lessees (Protection of Sub-Tenants) Act 1952 brought within the Rent Acts tenants, lessees and mortgagors of Crown property, except where the Crown was the immediate landlord, lessor or mortgagee.

The Accommodation Agencies Act 1953 prohibited the taking of money from a prospective tenant simply by registering his name and requirements and prevented the making of charges simply for supplying the addresses of accommodation available to let. Local authorities in England and Wales were given power to prosecute in the magistrates' court.

The Housing Repairs and Rents Act 1954 (2 & 3 Eliz. 2. c. 53) sought to encourage landlords to repair controlled houses by allowing a "repairs increase" in the rent for houses brought into, and maintained in, good repair. It also sought to encourage the building and conversion of houses for letting to tenants by excluding from control all dwelling-houses built after 30 August 1954 and all separate, self-contained dwellings produced by conversion after that date, except in cases that had attracted improvement grants.

Rent tribunals were empowered to fix, upon application, an appropriate increase in the rent for increases in the cost of providing services in pre-1939 act controlled tenancies.

All tenancies owned by local authorities, development corporations and housing associations and trusts were excluded from the application of the Rent Acts.

The passing on to the tenant of rates increases and limited increases in rent attributable to improvements or structural alterations carried out by the landlord to a dwelling had been permitted since the inception of the Rent Acts. The 1954 act permitted specified increases for dwelling-houses that were kept in good repair by the landlord, but limited the total rent recoverable to twice the gross value of the dwelling-house.

It removed the ban on premiums in the case of the assignment of leases granted for periods exceeding 21 years, it relaxed the rules if a premium was paid on the grant, continuance, renewal or assignment of a tenancy if it consisted of reasonable expenditure on alterations or improvements, or a reasonable amount for goodwill.

==== Extension and release ====
Part l of the Landlord and Tenant Act 1954 extended Rent Act protection to tenants under long leases at low rents, and to the sub-tenants of tenants under such leases, by providing a procedure that converted those tenants into statutory tenants on the expiry of their tenancies.

The Requisitioned Houses and Housing (Amendment) Act 1955 released from requisition those houses where the licensed occupier was accepted by the owner as a statutory tenant. The owner of the house was compensated for giving up the right to possession.

Passed only after several particularly severe smoke-polluted fogs (called "smog") in London and the industrial towns had caused health problems, the Clean Air Act 1956 (which applied north and south of the border) reimbursed expenditure spent on the adaptation of fireplaces to burn smokeless fuel. The work counted as an improvement for rent increase purposes under the Rent Act 1957 (5 & 6 Eliz. 2. c. 25). Eight per cent of the cost (net of any reimbursement) could be added to the rent.

== Decontrol 1957 to 1965 ==
Rent Act 1957 (Note: Section 27(1).)
- Act of Parliament
- Parliament of the United Kingdom
- Long title: An Act to amend the Rent and Mortgage Interest Restrictions Acts, 1920 to 1939, the Rent of Furnished Houses Control (Scotland) Act, 1943, the Furnished Houses (Rent Control) Act, 1946, the Housing (Repairs and Rents) (Scotland) Act, 1954, and certain other enactments relating to the control of rents and the right to retain possession of houses; to provide a minimum length for notice to terminate residential lettings; and for purposes connected with the matters aforesaid.
- Citation: 5 & 6 Eliz. 2. c. 25
- Territorial extent: England and Wales; Scotland; (Note: Section 27(4).)

Dates
- Royal assent: 6 June 1957
- Commencement: 6 July 1957 (Note: Section 27(2).)
- Repealed: Scotland: 12 August 1971

Other legislation
- Amends: Increase of Rent and Mortgage Interest (Restrictions) Act 1920; Rent and Mortgage Interest Restrictions Act 1923; Housing (Financial Provisions) Act 1924; Landlord and Tenant Act 1927; Rent and Mortgage Interest Restrictions (Amendment) Act 1933; Housing (Financial Provisions) Act 1938; Increase of Rent and Mortgage Interest (Restrictions) Act 1938; Housing (Rural Workers) Amendment Act 1938; Rent and Mortgage Interest Restrictions Act 1939; Rent of Furnished Houses Control (Scotland) Act 1943; Furnished Houses (Rent Control) Act 1946; Housing (Financial and Miscellaneous Provisions) Act 1946; Landlord and Tenant (Rent Control) Act 1949; Housing Act 1949; Landlord and Tenant (Rent Control) Act 1949; Finance Act 1949; Housing Act 1949; Reserve and Auxiliary Forces (Protection of Civil Interests) Act 1951; Crown Lessees (Protection of Sub Tenants) Act 1952; Housing Act 1952; Housing Repairs and Rents Act 1954; Housing (Repairs and Rents) (Scotland) Act 1954; Landlord and Tenant Act 1954; Requisitioned Houses and Housing (Amendment) Act 1955; Rating and Valuation (Miscellaneous Provisions) Act 1955
- Repeals/revokes: Rent Restrictions (Notices of Increase) Act 1923
- Amended by: Housing Act 1957; Housing (Financial Provisions) Act 1958; Landlord and Tenant Act 1962; London Government Act 1963; Rent Act 1965; Housing (Scotland) Act 1966; Leasehold Reform Act 1967; Rent Act 1968; Housing (Financial Provisions) (Scotland) Act 1968; Protection from Eviction Act 1977
- Repealed by: Scotland: Rent (Scotland) Act 1971

Status: Partially repealed

Text of statute as originally enacted

Revised text of statute as amended

Text of the Rent Act 1957 as in force today (including any amendments) within the United Kingdom, from legislation.gov.uk.

The new Conservative government passed the Rent Act 1957 (5 & 6 Eliz. 2. c. 25) which decontrolled all the more valuable houses and reintroduced a system of gradual decontrol in a revised form. It also transformed the method of fixing the maximum rent payable by tenants by introducing a formula based upon rateable value.

Coming into effect on 6 July, the Rent Act 1957 immediately decontrolled all dwelling houses and all contracts for furnished lettings of dwelling houses, with rateable values on 7 November 1956 exceeding £40 in the Metropolitan Police District or the City of London and Scotland, and £30 elsewhere in England and Wales; and tenancies granted for a period exceeding 21 years.

No new tenancies were to be subject to control, whatever the rateable value of the premises, unless granted to a tenant who was immediately before its creation a controlled tenant of the same premises or premises that included them.

Premiums and payments of rent in advance were forbidden to be charged to tenants of premises that had become decontrolled by the act for a period of three years from the commencement of the act. A minimum of four weeks' notice to quit was introduced and the act enabled the exchange of controlled tenancies by agreement of all parties concerned, without loss of security or rent control, The act used the word "exchange" although "transfer" would have been more apt.

The "standard rent" was replaced with a new "rent limit" calculated by multiplying the 1956 gross value by a factor determined according to the repairing liabilities of the parties. For instance, where the landlord was responsible for all repairs and external decoration, (the tenant being responsible for internal decoration only) the 1956 gross value would be multiplied by two to produce the annual rent limit. Other multipliers were to be used for different repairing and decorating liabilities.

The "rent limit" could be increased for rates borne by the landlord and by a reasonable charge for the provision of any furniture or services. The limit was subject to periodic adjustment to take account of changes in the amount of the rates, changes in the provision of furniture or services and for improvements.

It could be reduced when the dwelling fell into disrepair. Eight per cent of the net cost of any improvement (i.e. after deducting the amount of any grant received by the landlord) for works completed after 5 July 1957 could be added to the rent.

The act gave the minister power for future rent control by order requiring the affirmative resolution of each House of Parliament.

In the late 1950s and early 1960s there were many newspaper reports of landlords victimising their (controlled) tenants to force them out of their homes. The new word "Rachmanism" (after Peter Rachman, a property owner who was alleged to be responsible for many of these cruel activities) was introduced into the language.

=== Suspension of possession orders ===
The Landlord and Tenant (Temporary Provisions) Act 1958 prohibited the recovery of possession except by legal proceedings of certain dwelling houses released from control by section 11(1) of the Rent Act 1957. It also suspended for a limited period the execution of any order made for possession for those still remaining in their homes on 1 August 1958, by postponing the effect of any earlier order for possession. It regulated the rent payable pending recovery of possession (to twice the 1956 gross value, plus rates, and for services and furniture unless the contractual rent previously payable was higher). It made it an offence to recover possession other than by proceedings in court and to withhold services or furniture to which the tenant was entitled.

Certain grounds were provided whereby a landlord could try to satisfy the court that an order for possession should subsequently be granted.

=== Excessive payments for furniture ===
The Landlord and Tenant (Furniture and Fittings) Act 1959, which came into force on 29 July 1959 prohibited landlords from requiring excessive payments for furniture, fittings, and other articles as a condition of the grant, renewal, continuance, or assignment of tenancies of dwellings. Such payments were an attempt to find a way round the prohibition to require a premium in the Landlord and Tenant (Rent Control) Act 1949.

=== Powers of inspection ===
Offenders attempting to obtain from prospective tenants excessive amounts for furniture and fittings were liable to be punished by a fine not exceeding £100. Local authorities were given powers to inspect dwellings where they suspected an offence had been committed.

Private street works made under the Highways Act 1959 (7 & 8 Eliz. 2. c. 25), which updated earlier provisions in the Public Health Act 1875 and the Private Streets Works Act 1892 counted as improvements. Their net cost were included in the calculation of rent increases.

=== Repairing liabilities in short leases ===
The effect of the neglect of repairing liabilities during and after the Second World War faced many tenants on short leases with huge bills for dilapidations to make good dwellings which had been originally let in a poor state of repair. Such tenants did not at that time have sufficient security of tenure to enable them to reap the benefit from carrying out major repairs.

Under the Housing Act 1961 (see particularly sections 32 and 33) where a tenancy of a dwelling house for less than seven years was granted after 24 October 1961, the landlord was required by an implied covenant to keep in repair the structure and interior (including drains, gutters and external pipes) and to keep in repair and proper working order the installations in the house for the supply of water, gas and electricity, for sanitation, and for space heating and heating water. This applied whatever the rent or the rateable value. The act included a provision to prohibit the backdating of a lease. The term of years counted from the date of lease signing.

The 1961 act increased the percentage addition to the rent for the net cost of improvement works carried out after 24 November 1961, from eight per cent (as it had been in the Rent Act 1957) to twelve and one half per cent.

=== Weekly rent books ===
The Landlord and Tenant Act 1962 (10 & 11 Eliz. 2. c. 50) required landlords to provide rent books for tenancies when rent was payable weekly (except where board represented a substantial part of the rent). This act had a more general application than the 1938 act, and consolidated certain requirements from the 1933 act and the Rent Act 1957. Information to include was prescribed, and the tenant was given the right to obtain information, particularly when the landlord was a company. The penalty for an offence was a fine not exceeding £50 (or £100 for a second conviction).

The Housing Act 1964 set up the Housing Corporation to assist housing associations to provide housing accommodation in England, Wales and Scotland. It authorised the Scottish Special Housing Association to act on behalf of the Housing Corporation in Scotland.

=== Standard amenities and grants ===
The 1964 Act conferred on local authorities the duty to compel the improvement of dwellings that were without standard amenities and amended improvement grant legislation to provide improvement grants and standard grants. The standard amenities were:

- a fixed bath or shower in a bathroom with a supply of hot and cold water;
- a wash hand basin with a supply of hot and cold water;
- a hot and cold water supply to a sink;
- a water closet; and
- satisfactory facilities for storing food.

=== Protection from eviction ===
The Protection from Eviction Act 1964 of 17 December 1964 was an interim measure intended to run to the end of 1965 and then expire. This to give time for an overhaul of the legislation.

It restricted the eviction of residential occupiers from their homes. Widows and widowers and members of the family living with the residential occupier at the date of death were also covered. Agricultural service occupiers were treated as tenants for 1964 act purposes.

It became unlawful to evict other than by proceedings in a county court or to withdraw or withhold services or furniture. On summary conviction, the offender was liable to a fine of £100 or six months' imprisonment, or both.

These new offences of illegal eviction and harassment were soon to be absorbed into the Rent Act 1965 and eventually to be transferred into the Protection from Eviction Act 1977.

The courts could suspend recent possession orders, could suspend the execution of an order for possession for up to twelve months and could impose certain conditions and terms.

There were a few exceptions (e.g., tenancies the following acts applied to: Small Landholders (Scotland) Acts 1886-1931, Tenancy of Shops (Scotland) Act 1949 (12, 13 & 14 Geo. 6. c. 25), Agricultural Holdings (Scotland) Act 1949 (12, 13 & 14 Geo. 6. c. 75), Crofters (Scotland) Acts 1955-1961). Nothing affected the operation of the Small Tenements Recovery Act 1838 (1 & 2 Vict. c. 74) (which included brothels and premises acquired for defence purposes) or the Pluralities Act 1838 (1 & 2 Vict. c. 106) or the Lecturers and Parish Clerks Act 1844 (7 & 8 Vict. c. 59) (ecclesiastical property).)

It postponed until the end of March 1966 the decontrol of dwellings requisitioned during the war.

== Rent regulation 1965 to 1989 ==
=== A new rent system 1965 to 1971 ===
The Labour Government elected in 1964 had pledged to repeal the Rent Act 1957. It was clearly impossible to re-impose rent control in a simple way. A Committee on Housing in Greater London under the chairmanship of Sir Milner Holland, QC, reported in March 1965. They found that there was "an acute shortage of rented housing in London and many difficulties and hardships arising from it". This was not a situation peculiar to London. They observed that neither rigid control nor piecemeal and haphazard decontrol could relieve the situation and that any new system of control (or regulation) should provide that rents in future should be subject to periodic review.

In this situation and in these circumstances came a new piece of legislation that was a major turning point. Richard Crossman, Lord Goodman, who became President of the Institute of Rent Officers and others claimed paternity rights.

The Rent Act 1965 (c. 75) introduced the Rent Officer Service. The Ministry of Housing and Local Government, which later became part of the Department of the Environment, and then Department of the Environment, Transport and the Regions, was responsible for setting up the administrative arrangements and the appointment of the first Rent Officers, in England and Wales. Appointments were made by the "proper officer" a designated official in each local authority (usually the chief executive or senior legal executive of the county council or of each London borough who was responsible for providing accommodation, for supervision and disciplinary matters. The service was funded from central government by grant claims.

In practice these matters were delegated to a Senior Rent Officer in each of the seventy-seven original registration area offices. Decisions made by individual rent officers were considered as to be made independently. The system was devised so that Rent Officer's decisions could not be influenced by local or central government. Administrative staff were appointed who were employed by the local authority.

The first rent officer appointments were made in the City of Westminster where rent officers appointed in other registration areas were trained. Early appointments were made from the legal profession, from the Inland Revenue valuation office, former estate agents, property managers, and retired ex-military and retired ex-policemen. The first rent registration was made on a flat above a fishmongers shop in Paddington Street, Marylebone, London W1.

The Institute of Rent Officers (IRO) was formed to promote a professional approach and to carry out education and training. The Journal of the Institute of Rent Officers JIRO was published quarterly to encourage discussion of procedures, valuation practice and to provide information about new legislation and "case law" arising from legal decisions in the Courts relating to landlord and tenant matters.

The Educational Trust of the Institute of Rent Officers published guides and a brown-coloured Manual of Rent Regulation which provided practitioners with annotated amendments as complete reprinted pages to residential landlord and tenant legislation in loose-leaf form. This important and prompt updating service incorporated the many amendments noted in this guide. The brown manual could often be seen on the bench of high court judges and in the hands of solicitors and barristers representing landlords and tenants in the courts.

=== Scope of regulation ===
Rent Act 1965 (Note: Section 53(1).)
- Act of Parliament
- Parliament of the United Kingdom
- Long title: An Act to restore the right to retain possession of certain dwellings; to make further provision with respect to security of tenure, rents and premiums; to restrict evictions without due process of law; and for purposes connected with those matters.
- Citation: 1965 c. 75
- Territorial extent: England and Wales; Scotland; (Note: Section 53(3)–(4).)

Dates
- Royal assent: 8 November 1965
- Commencement: 8 November 1965 (part II); 8 December 1965; (Note: Section 53(2).)
- Repealed: England and Wales: 29 August 1977; Scotland: 31 January 1985

Other legislation
- Amends: School Sites Act 1841; Inclosure Act 1845; Inclosure Act 1852; Defence Act 1859; Small Dwellings Acquisition Act 1899; Increase of Rent and Mortgage Interest (Restrictions) Act 1920; Small Holdings and Allotments Act 1926; Rent and Mortgage Interest Restrictions (Amendment) Act 1933; Increase of Rent and Mortgage Interest (Restrictions) Act 1938; Rent and Mortgage Interest Restrictions Act 1939; Rent of Furnished Houses Control (Scotland) Act 1943; Furnished Houses (Rent Control) Act 1946; Landlord and Tenant (Rent Control) Act 1949; Legal Aid and Advice Act 1949; Civil Aviation Act 1949; Reserve and Auxiliary Forces (Protection of Civil Interests) Act 1951; Housing Repairs and Rents Act 1954; Housing (Repairs and Rents) (Scotland) Act 1954; Rent Act 1957; Housing Act 1957; County Courts Act 1959; House Purchase and Housing Act 1959; Housing (Scotland) Act 1962; Town and Country Planning Act 1962; Housing Act 1964; Protection from Eviction Act 1964; New Towns Act 1965
- Repeals/revokes: Small Tenements Recovery Act 1838
- Amended by: Leasehold Reform Act 1967; Rent Act 1968; Rent (Scotland) Act 1971; Fire Precautions Act 1971; Statute Law (Repeals) Act 1975
- Repealed by: England and Wales: Protection from Eviction Act 1977; Scotland: Rent (Scotland) Act 1984

Status: Repealed

Text of statute as originally enacted

The Rent Act 1965 (c. 75) brought within protection most houses that were decontrolled by the Rent Act 1957, and newer houses that had never been controlled (i.e., newly erected or produced by conversion after 30 August 1954). It gave security to tenancies of most dwelling houses with rateable values of up to £400 in Greater London and £200 elsewhere not already controlled. The Rent Act 1965 cleverly began by stating that a tenancy under which a dwelling house (which could be a house or part of a house) was let as a separate dwelling was a protected tenancy.

There were certain exceptions (which were modified and added to in subsequent legislation). References are those in Part I of the later consolidated Rent Act 1977:

- Section 4 Dwelling-houses above certain rateable values
- Section 5 Tenancies at low rents
- Section 5A Certain shared ownership leases
- Section 6 Dwelling-houses let with land other than the site of the house
- Section 7 Dwelling-houses bona-fide let at a rent that includes board (a meal or meals)and/or attendance (services personal to the tenant) where the value to the tenant forms a substantial part of the rent
- Section 8 Lettings to students pursuing a course of studies
- Section 9 Where a dwelling-house was let for the purpose of a holiday
- Section 10 Agricultural tenancies
- Section 11 Licensed premises
- Section 12 Where the landlord was resident in the same house
- Section 13 Where the interest of the landlord belonged to Her Majesty in the right of the Crown
- Section 14 Local authority tenancies
- Section 15 Housing association tenancies
- Section 16 Housing co-operative tenancies
- Section 22 Tenants sharing accommodation with persons other than the landlord
- Section 24 Premises with a business use

The Rent Act 1965 introduced three major innovations. Firstly, except for furnished lettings, it was the first time that a new long-term flexible approach had been brought to the old problem of rent control. It substituted the rent-fixing formula of earlier legislation with independent rent regulation by rent officers. This introduced the normal valuation principles into the assessment of a fair rent (section 68 in the Rent Act 1965 and section 70 in the consolidated Rent Act 1977) by requiring that regard should specifically be had to the age, character, locality and state of repair of the dwelling. Personal circumstances were to be disregarded as were improvements carried out voluntarily by, and any disrepair or defects attributable to, the tenant or a predecessor in title. A most fundamental concept was introduced whereby it had to be assumed that the number of persons seeking to become tenants of similar dwelling houses in the locality on the terms (other than those relating to rent) of the regulated tenancy was not substantially greater than the number of such dwelling-houses in the locality that were available for letting on such terms. This requirement to assume a roughly balanced market was described by commentators as the "scarcity factor", (words that did not appear in the act). There was an automatic rent review (but only if applied for) at three-yearly intervals (reduced to two-yearly intervals in the Housing Act 1980).

Secondly, it instituted rent registration, schemes for the appointment of rent officers and a nationwide Rent Officer Service. Rent officers were required, in accordance with specified procedures, upon application to determine and register fair rents. Objections to the rents determined by rent officers by either landlords or tenants were to be passed to a network of rent assessment committees with appellate jurisdiction. Rent officers appointed as "statutory officers" therefore had a quasi-judicial function. As a tribunal of first instance they had the same duty as the former furnished rent tribunals to determine their own jurisdiction to act upon an application. Appeals against such decisions as to jurisdiction were to be considered by a county court.

Thirdly, the act made it an offence for any person unlawfully (i.e. without a court order) to evict a tenant or to harass with the intention of persuading the tenant to move out or to forego any rights in respect of the premises. The offences applied irrespective of the dwelling's rateable value and service occupiers and other licensees whose licence was still in existence were also protected.

The percentage increase of the net cost to be added to the rent for improvements carried out after 8 December 1965 and after the rent had been agreed, was twelve and one half per cent.

The right of succession to a statutory tenancy was extended to enable the tenancy to be transmitted to a second successor on the same rules applicable to the transmission on the death of the original tenant or of the first successor.

The Rent Act 1965 also raised to £400 in Greater London and £200 elsewhere the rateable value limits of furnished houses within the jurisdiction of rent tribunals and extended the maximum period by which they could delay the operation of a notice to quit to six months. The presidents of rent assessment panels in England and Wales were empowered to make appointments to Rent Tribunals in their areas.

The Rent Act 1965 provided for the conversion of statutory tenancies subsisting under the provisions of the Requisitioned Houses and Housing (Amendment) Act 1955 by extending its time limit for this purpose. This finally tidied up one of the remaining consequences of the wartime emergency. The Airports Authority Act 1965 added the net cost of soundproofing works to the list of improvements that could increase rents.

The Agriculture Act 1967 (c. 22) contained provisions relating to the letting and recovery of farm houses that became redundant following the amalgamation of farms under that act.

The Leasehold Reform Act 1967 (c. 88) brought back into the acts long tenancies (a tenancy granted for a term of years certain exceeding twenty-one years) (other than those at a low rent), but unintentionally applied to them the Rent Act inhibitions upon premiums.

The Caravan Sites Act 1968 (c. 52) made it unlawful, without the sanction of the courts, to deprive a person who occupied a caravan as a residence, whether owned or rented, on a caravan pitch that was protected (one that required a site licence under the Caravan Sites and Control of Development Act 1960). The Caravan Sites Act 1968 gave courts the power to suspend possession orders up to twelve months and protected caravan occupiers against harassment. Local authorities had power to prosecute. Harassment and illegal eviction was punishable by a fine of £100 for the first offence and £500 and six months imprisonment (or both) for a second offence.

With the exception of section 16 of the Rent Act 1957 (notices to quit) and part III of the Rent Act 1965 (illegal eviction and harassment), the Rent Act 1968 consolidated all the earlier Rent Acts; the Furnished Houses (Rent Control) Act 1946, the Landlord and Tenant (Rent Control) Act 1949, part II of the Housing Repairs and Rents Act 1954 and other related enactments (some twenty-four in all), without rationalising or simplifying them.

The Rent Act 1965 had previously provided the power by ministerial order for the progressive conversion of existing controlled tenancies to regulated tenancies. This power was never exercised and the Housing Act 1969 introduced a phased programme of conversion, determined by rateable values, and the qualification certificate procedure outlined below, for those controlled tenancies in good repair and equipped with standard amenities.

Grants became available to provide dwellings by conversion or for improvements of existing dwellings and there were special grants for houses in multiple occupation. Grants to provide standard amenities were specified (e.g. £30 for a bath or shower; £50 for a water closet and £30 for a hot and cold water supply at a sink) The term "improvements" included the replacement of an existing fixture or fitting.

Qualification certificates could be issued by a local authority for premises that had all the standard amenities and were in good repair. A certificate of fair rent issued by the Rent Officer stated what the fair rent would be once any missing standard amenities had been provided. A fair rent could then be determined (the application was supported by the certificate of fair rent) but the increase in rent was phased over a period of four years (two years if the work had been aided by an improvement grant). Amount attributable to services Rent Officers had previously informally shown an amount for the value of services on the register. The 1969 act required there to be a note on the rent register of the amount attributable to the provision of services (but not if the charge for the services was variable). A note was now also required of the increase over the amount for services in the previous rent (which could be calculated by apportionment if necessary). This amount affected the phasing calculation.

The act introduced a new definition of a house in multiple occupation (HMO) and provided for registers and orders applying a management code. Powers were given to local authorities to close an HMO (or part of it) if it was not possible to provide a fire escape. It introduced the possibility of control orders to be followed by compulsory purchase orders. Directions were made to avoid or reduce overcrowding.

In determining whether a long tenancy was a tenancy at a low rent, the sums payable by the tenant in respect of rates, services, repairs, maintenance or insurance now had to be disregarded.

The act removed most of the unintended consequences of the Leasehold Reform Act 1967 in respect of premiums and the price to be paid for enfranchisement. Increased rents registered between 10 July 1968 and 31 December 1969 were liable to phasing under the Prices and Incomes Regulations 1968 (which only applied until the end of 1969). When those regulations expired, the Rent (Control of Increases) Act 1969 (which only applied to the end of 1971) introduced phasing of rent increases generally speaking over three equal annual increments.

Improvements to the security of tenure available to occupants of agricultural tied cottages were made by the Agriculture Act 1970 (c. 40). It amended section 33 of the Rent Act 1965 to ensure that, subject to conditions, the tenant of a tied cottage, or his widow, would automatically get at least six months' security of tenure alter the employment ended. This act extended the provisions of the Agriculture Act 1967 (c. 22) to all redundant farm houses and not only just those redundant due to amalgamation of farms under the 1967 act.

The Fire Precautions Act 1971 (c. 40) made amendments to the Rent Act 1968 and arrangements to amend the Rent (Scotland) Act 1971. Where a dwelling was subject to a controlled or a regulated tenancy and the dwelling was issued with a fire certificate, the amount of the expenditure (or a proportion of it approved by a county court) incurred in fire precautions work was to be considered as an improvement in an application for a certificate of fair rent. A county court could, upon application, determine an increase in the rent of controlled or regulated tenancies due to the cost of carrying out fire precaution works.

=== Adjustments in 1971 to 1977 ===
A review under the chairmanship of Hugh Francis QC was commissioned in October 1969 to review the operation of rent regulation under the Rent Acts, especially in large centres of population where accommodation was scarce, and to consider the relationship between the furnished and unfurnished codes.

Its conclusion, published on 2 March 1971, was that rent regulation was working well. The report made 36 recommendations, four of which were enacted in the Housing Finance Act 1972, an act that in its time had a minor claim to fame—57 committee sittings taking an exceptional 248 hours of debate in the House of Commons.

The 1972 act introduced many new concepts:

- Rent rebates were to be provided for all local authority tenants. Each local authority had to introduce a model scheme. Rent allowances were to be provided for private tenants whether protected or statutory. These were to be administered by the local housing authority and details of the availability of these allowances had to be entered in rent books.

Previously, rent rebates had been introduced on a discretionary basis (in Scotland by the Housing (Scotland) Act 1966), which had led to haphazard, piecemeal and inconsistent implementation.

- There was also a requirement for more general publicity. Private landlords had to tell existing and new tenants about the availability of rent allowances.
- Remaining controlled tenancies could be converted by stages. The conversion machinery introduced by the Housing Act 1969 had enabled controlled tenancies to be converted unto regulated tenancies where the property was in, or was improved into, the required standard. The process was speeded up by the 1972 act, which provided for automatic conversion of all remaining controlled tenancies, whether or not they met the 1969 act criteria, by stages (intended to be completed in two years) according to the property's rateable value. The earlier qualification certificate procedure was not being implemented as intended. Some over zealous local authorities had been misinterpreting what constituted "good repair" and it would have taken several years to complete the intended progress.
- Local authorities were given powers to apply to the Rent Officer to consider whether a rent should be registered in respect of any regulated tenancy. The Rent Officer had to be satisfied that the highest rent payable under the tenancy agreement exceeded a fair rent before he could proceed to register a rent.
- Landlords and tenants were given the right (subject to certain conditions) to apply, jointly, for cancellation of a registered rent. Such an application could only be entertained by a Rent Officer after the expiry of the (then) three-year registration period. The cancellation was only to be permitted of the Rent Officer considered that the agreed rent did not exceed a fair rent.
- It introduced the right to apply three months before the expiry of a previously controlled tenancy for consideration of a fair rent. This enabled the standard administrative procedures to be completed in time so that the Rent Officer's decision could be expected to coincide with the expiry of the previous registration.
- It unfroze the contractual rent limit, which had previously been fixed until the registration of a fair rent (some of which could have been set in 1965).
- Provision was made for landlords and tenants of regulated tenancies for which no fair rent had been registered, to agree (using a special written agreement) rent increases without reference to the Rent Officer and without losing their rights to make some future application for a fair rent to be determined. But if the rent agreement was the first to take effect after the controlled tenancy had been converted into a regulated tenancy by the 1972 act, the agreement had to be lodged with the Rent Officer who would only allow the agreement to have effect if the agreed rent did not exceed a fair rent.
- Changes were made to statutory succession. Until this act, a new tenancy granted to a first or second statutory success or had created new succession rights. From 27 August 1972, a new tenancy granted by succession to a person who was a statutory tenant by succession did not create any new succession rights. Another of the recommendations of the Francis Committee, to increase the maximum penalties for harassment and unlawful eviction, was included in the Criminal Justice Act 1972.

The Housing Finance Act 1972 also brought fundamental changes to rent legislation. It became the duty of every local authority and new town corporation to determine a fair rent (on the same basis and definition as a fair rent for regulated tenancies) for every one of their housing revenue account dwellings. This was to be done by making provisional assessments of fair rents for their properties. These assessments had to be submitted to a rent scrutiny board that could confirm them or substitute different rents. These provisions were repealed in 1976. Dwellings owned by housing associations and housing trusts (usually charities), which were registered with the Housing Corporation (but not those that were registered societies under the Industrial and Provident Societies Act 1965) were brought within the fair rent system. From 1 January 1973, their rents were to be determined by Rent Officers and registered in a separate part of the Rent Register. New subsidies were introduced for housing associations and housing trusts registered with the Housing Corporation.

For the first time, tenants were entitled to information about the cost of services provided by landlords when the cost exceeded £80. Local authorities, other public sector landlords (including housing associations) and management companies run by their tenants were excepted. A failure to provide information became a criminal offence.

The Rent Assessment Committee (England and Wales) Regulations 1971 was the first of many statutory instruments that regulated procedures to follow when dealing with appeals against rent officer decisions.

=== Rents frozen 1972 ===
Orders made under the Counter Inflation (Temporary Provisions) Act 1972 froze rents at their level on 6 November 1972 (as well as prices and wages) as part of the government's counter inflation measures. The freeze lasted initially for 90 days and was extended to 150 days by a later Order. Conversions from controlled to regulated tenancies (and in general, increases in rents of housing association tenancies) were postponed until the end of the standstill period.

The freeze applied to all private residential tenancies including those with rateable values above the Rent Act limits.

The Counter-Inflation Act 1973 imposed a further freeze from March 1974 (until March 1975 in England and Wales) (until May 1975 in Scotland).

The Furnished Lettings (Rent Allowances) Act 1973 extended the rent allowance scheme to furnished lettings (those contracts within Part VI of the Rent Act 1968) and for certain housing authority furnished lettings, except where the landlord was the Crown or where substantial board was provided.

=== Rateable value limits 1973 ===
Owing to the increased pressure of demand for housing resulting in increased house prices by a continuing trend during 1971 and 1972, a Conservative government used the Counter-Inflation Act 1973 to extend the scope of Rent Act protection of higher-rated accommodation on 23 March 1973. The rateable value limits were raised from £400 to £600 in London and from £200 to £400 elsewhere for those properties appearing in the 1963 valuation list. Those limits were raised to £1,500 in London and to £750 elsewhere from 1 April 1973 to take account of the revised valuation list that took effect on that date. It was estimated that this brought a further 16,000 tenancies into protection. Luxury blocks of flats with extensive porterage and services were swept into control and even in Central London only a few very large individual houses in Regent's Park were found to be outside the scope of Rent Act protection.

The rateable value limits for Rent Act protection were not changed for Scotland.

=== Assimilation of furnished tenancies 1974 ===
Three important acts were passed in the next two years. The Rent Act 1974 brought full protection to those existing furnished lettings where the landlord was not resident in the same premises. Previously they had had only limited protection under the 1943, 1946 and 1949 acts. The concept of "resident landlord" was entirely new. For all new tenancies created on or after 14 August 1974, whether furnished or unfurnished, the factor to decide their protection was to be the residency or non-residency of the landlord.

The Housing Act 1974 gave many private tenants the right to additional information as to the identity of their landlord, and there was also a new duty to inform a tenant of a dwelling of the assignment of a landlord's interest. It extended the right to information about service charges and introduced the right to challenge them. The form and content of certain notices to quit was to be prescribed by regulations to be made by the Secretary of State and the improvement grant system was re-vamped. Housing action areas, general improvement areas and priority neighbourhoods were introduced.

Grants for the provision of standard amenities, improvements (which were compulsory in some cases) and for the repair of dwellings were introduced. The act also extended the powers of the Housing Corporation with regard to housing associations and amended the system of providing financial assistance to them.

=== Phasing 1975 ===
Housing Rents and Subsidies Act 1975 (Note: Section 17(1).)
- Act of Parliament
- Parliament of the United Kingdom
- Long title: An Act to repeal certain provisions of the Housing Finance Act 1972; to make further provision as to rents; to introduce new housing subsidies for local authorities and new town corporations and abolish certain existing subsidies; to render certain housing associations whose rules restrict membership to tenants or prospective tenants and preclude the grant or assignment of tenancies to persons other than members eligible for housing association grant and revenue deficit grant under the Housing Act 1974; to make minor amendments of certain enactments relating to housing; and for connected purposes.
- Citation: 1975 c. 6
- Territorial extent: England and Wales; Isles of Scilly (in part); (Note: Section 17(9)–(10).)

Dates
- Royal assent: 25 February 1975
- Commencement: 25 February 1975 (Note: The Acts of Parliament (Commencement) Act 1793.)
- Repealed: 1 April 1986

Other legislation
- Amends: Housing Act 1957; Chronically Sick and Disabled Persons Act 1970; Housing Finance Act 1972; Furnished Lettings (Rent Allowances) Act 1973; Housing Act 1974
- Repeals/revokes: Counter-Inflation (Private Sector Residential Rents) (England and Wales) Order 1974; Counter-Inflation (Private Sector Residential Rents) (England and Wales) No. 2 Order 1974
- Amended by: Rent Act 1977
- Repealed by: Housing (Consequential Provisions) Act 1985

Status: Repealed

Text of statute as originally enacted

The Housing Rents and Subsidies Act 1975 repealed the provisions of the Housing Finance Act 1972 in relation to public sector dwellings and by and large gave local authorities a free hand in determining their rent policies. The gradual decontrol process based on rateable values was stopped, and a system of phased rent increases was introduced for all tenancies. Apart from the temporary provisions in the counter-inflation legislation in 1972 and 1973, mentioned earlier, there had been previously no phasing of increases of rent following re-registration of a fair rent.

These phasing arrangements required a careful scrutiny of the cost of providing services and assessment of the value of services. The Social Security (Consequential Provisions) Act 1992 required the amount attributable to services to be noted on the Rent Register to assist the assessment of housing benefit.

New amenities or improvements to a locality that were not provided at the landlords expense were to be disregarded in determination of a fair rent—and by a very late amendment, any deterioration in a locality that was not the fault of the landlord were to be disregarded. Semantics came into the valuation process. Fortunately these disregards were subsequently repealed.

=== Agricultural workers protected 1976 ===
Some agricultural workers, forestry workers and members of their families had enjoyed security of occupation under the Rent Acts. The Rent (Agriculture) Act 1976 conferred on occupiers of "tied cottages" protection similar to that enjoyed by Rent Act statutory tenants. Rents became eligible for registration under the fair rent system and such decisions kept in a separate part of the Rent Register.

=== The great consolidation 1977 ===
In 1977 previous legislation (except the Rent (Agriculture) Act 1976 was consolidated into the Rent Act 1977 (which embodied the "temporary" counter inflation device of phasing) and the Protection from Eviction Act 1977 (which contained special provisions in respect of agricultural workers) consolidated the provisions of previous Rent Acts (chiefly the acts of 1957 and 1965), which protected all residential occupiers from eviction without due process of law.

=== Definitions ===
"Sitting tenant" is not used in the legislation but is in general use to mean anyone who has a tenancy protected by legislation. These are usually considered to be long term tenants. A "fair rent" is a rent registered under the Rent Act 1977. A "controlled tenancy" is a tenancy created before 1957. A "Regulated tenancy" is one created after 1965 that is regulated now by the Rent Act 1977 and for which a rent can be registered by the rent officer (sometimes called a "Fair Rent Officer"). A "protected tenant" is someone who has a tenancy protected by the Rent Acts. This can either be a "Contractual tenancy" during the term of a lease (contract) or tenancy agreement. When this contract expires the tenancy becomes a "statutory tenancy" in which the tenant "holds over" under the protection of the statutes (Rent Acts) on the same terms as the original contract (in so far as they are not overtaken by statute). It might be obvious but it is worth just repeating that a protected tenant with security of tenure is not much use if the rent cannot be controlled. A fair rent is not much use unless the tenant has protection from eviction.

=== 1980 to 1989 ===
The Housing Act 1980 made various amendments to the Rent Act 1977 that changed procedures for rent registration. The rent registration review period was reduced from three to two years. The periods of phasing of increases were consequently quickened. Following the referral of a decision to a Rent Assessment Committee the two-year period was made to run from the date of their decision rather than the original effective date. Registered rents were made effective from the date of registration rather than the date of the application. In those cases when the registration was made before the expiration of the two-year period, the registration took effect from the day following the expiry of the two-year period. The act made changes to the procedures for the need for Rent Officers to call consultations in certain circumstances. The act also made changes to the requirements necessary before a registration could be cancelled. The original registration had to be at least two years old. The landlord alone could make an application if the premises were no longer let on a regulated tenancy.

A new mandatory ground for possession (Case 20) was introduced for lettings by servicemen. Changes were made to the mandatory grounds for possession for lettings by former owner occupiers and those who own homes intended for retirement, which covered circumstances that could not have been foreseen at the time of the letting.

Rent Tribunals were abolished. Their functions, except for the power to grant security of tenure, were transferred to rent assessment committees. A more limited discretion to award security of tenure (a maximum of three months) was given to the county court, as part of the possession order proceedings.

Any remaining controlled tenancies were converted to regulated tenancies.

New protected shorthold tenancies were created that protected during the contractual term of a short fixed-term letting. A rent had to be registered at the time the tenancy was granted or a certificate of fair rent obtained before then and a registration made within twenty-eight days of the commencement of the tenancy. This requirement was removed for all registration areas outside Greater London by the Protected Shorthold Tenancies (Rent Registration) Order 1981 (SI 1981/1578) and for registration areas in Greater London by a similar order in 1987.

Assured tenancies were created that gave certain approved bodies the right to create assured tenancies of new dwellings outside Rent Act protection at market rents. These tenancies were subject to the provisions of Part II of the Landlord and Tenant Act 1954.

Additional protection was given to council tenants and many housing association tenants, who were to be known as secure tenants.

Council tenants were granted the right to buy their homes.

Personal representatives of deceased resident landlords were given a period of two years (instead of the one year under the 1974 act) during which they had freedom to evict. The act qualified the description of accommodations so that a tenancy of part of a flat in a purpose-built block occupied by a resident landlord could not be subject to a protected tenancy, an unintended effect of the wording in the Rent Act 1974.

Housing Associations registered under the Industrial and Provident Societies Act 1965 might now be registered with the Housing Corporation even if their objectives were to acquire, repair, improve or convert houses for eventual disposal by sale as well as by lease.

Prior to the 1980 act, housing associations had to keep their houses available for letting and were therefore prohibited from selling them. Housing associations were now enabled to build or to improve property or to put existing properties up for sale into shared ownership.

Protection could now extend to previously protected tenancies—those that belonged to Her Majesty in right of the Crown, if managed by the Crown Estate Commissioners (largely in the right of the Duchy of Lancaster, tenancies that belong to the Duchy of Cornwall), statutory tenancies under the Rent (Agriculture) Act 1976 and long leaseholds at low rents (Part I Landlord and Tenant Act 1954). (Tenants of the Crown direct and of government departments (which includes tenants of a Health Service Body) remain outside protection).

Shared ownership leases were not to be treated as long tenancies at a low rent for the purposes of the Leasehold Reform Act 1967. Rent Officers were asked to determine fair rents on a non-statutory basis for shared ownership properties. Initial enthusiasm was tempered when questions of some difficulty arose in the assessment of a fair rent relating to equity stakes and premiums. These were dealt with later in the Housing and Planning Act 1986.

The Matrimonial Homes Act 1983 consolidated certain enactments relating to the rights of a husband or wife to occupy a dwelling house that had been a matrimonial home. Occupation by one spouse was to be treated as occupation by the other spouse. The act provided for the transfer of certain tenancies on divorce.

The Domestic Violence and Matrimonial Proceedings Act 1976 made provision for varying rights of occupation where both spouses (and a man and woman living together as man and wife) had rights in the matrimonial home. The 1976 act and the 1983 acts were further developed by the Matrimonial and Family Proceedings Act 1984, which also gave powers to the court in relation to the transfer of certain tenancies upon a decree of divorce, of nullity of marriage or of judicial separation.

The Mobile Homes Act 1983 replaced sections 1 to 6 of the Mobile Homes Act 1976. It introduced important new rules about security of tenure to owners of residential mobile home sites and to those who owned the mobile home and rented a pitch from the site owner (including local authorities but not traveller sites). It exempted those who rent the mobile home from the site owner and those who only use it for holiday purposes.

It also dealt with sales and gifts of mobile homes, inheritance and change of site ownership, pitch fees, other terms of agreements and provided machinery for dealing with disputes.

The Rent (Amendment) Act 1985 reversed the decision in Pocock v. Steel (1985 CA), which decided that an owner-occupier had to live in the house immediately before each and every letting to be able to obtain a mandatory order for possession. Words were inserted so that if it had "at any time" before the letting been occupied as the owner-occupier's residence, the Rent Act 1977 and the Rent (Scotland) Act 1984 applied. This restored the original intention that had been destroyed by redrafting in the consolidation in 1968. This act (apart from emergency legislation) broke all speed records in its passage through the parliamentary timetables.

=== Three main acts in 1985 ===
On 30 October 1985 there was a burst of general tidying up and consolidation with the publication of four acts. The Housing (Consequential Provisions) Act 1985 (c. 71) repealed 80 parts of acts or whole acts relating to England and Wales, 18 relating to Scotland and 4 to Northern Ireland (from the Brine Pumping (Compensation for Subsidence) Act 1891 (54 & 55 Vict. c. 40) to acts only just passed in 1985).

The Landlord and Tenant Act 1985 (c. 70) consolidated certain provisions relating to the law of landlord and tenant formerly found in the Housing Acts, Rent Acts and various other places. As such it created no new law. It incorporated sections as follows:

- Information to be given to a tenant (e.g. landlord's identity etc.).
- Provision of rent books (information to be contained and offences).
- Implied terms as to fitness for human habitation.
- Repairing obligations.
- Reasonableness of service charges.
- Leasehold Valuation Tribunals jurisdiction in certain cases to be exercisable by rent assessment committees.

The Housing Act 1985 (c. 68) consolidated certain provisions of the Housing Acts relating to housing associations and made some amendments to give effect to recommendations of the Law Commission and of the Scottish Law Commission. Its main headings were:

- The regulation of Housing Associations
- Housing association finance
- The Housing Corporation

The Housing Act 1985 consolidated the Housing Acts (except the Landlord and Tenant Act 1985 (c. 70) and the Housing Associations Act 1985 (c. 69)) and certain related provisions, with amendments intended to implement the recommendations of the Law Commission. This mammoth initiative reduced the principal acts relating to private lettings to the Rent Act 1977, the Landlord and Tenant Act 1985 and the Housing Associations Act 1985. However, it was not to be very long before further amendments were needed.

The Housing and Planning Act 1986 required that lawful premiums (paid in respect of some shared ownership leases, certain long tenancies (s. 127 Rent Act 1977) should be taken into account in the determination of a fair rent. Certain shared ownership leases were excluded from the operation of the Rent Act 1977, the Rent (Agriculture) Act 1976 and part I of the Leasehold Reform Act 1967.

Until the mid-1970s mortgages were largely unavailable for the purchase of flats (or large deposits were required with repayments at a high rate of interest). Large numbers of blocks of flats had been built in the 1930s usually on a leasehold basis for 99 years. Individual flats could only be sold on long leases for the remaining sixty or so years. Building societies did not consider this to be sufficient security for a mortgage. Once building societies changed their policies to offer 75% or sometimes larger mortgages at the same rates as paid for those for house purchases, landlords were able to sell flats as they became vacant on long leaseholds. Leases in older blocks with less than twenty years to run were almost impossible to sell. Landlords also began to offer long leases to sitting tenants sometimes at considerable discounts to open-market values. Now people rushed to get on the property ladder as house and flat prices rose as demand was stimulated. Investors from the Middle East after civil strife in Lebanon bought up many blocks of flats and moved to the UK.

Unfortunately for the new flat owners, they inherited responsibilities in their new long leases that required them to contribute to the cost of the repair and replacement. Much of the equipment had been installed in the 1930s when the blocks built (lifts, central heating and hot water boilers, roofs and windows) which had been neglected in low rent times. Residents' associations were few and it took almost ten years before legislation was introduce to control exploitation by landlords and managing agents (whose fees calculated on the total cost of new work often at inflated cost also had to be paid by residents).

The Nugee Committee (under the chairmanship of Edward Nugee QC), which commenced work in February 1984, finally reported in February 1986 on the management of privately owned blocks of flats. The Landlord and Tenant Act 1987 implemented the main recommendations and contained certain other measures relating to the rights of tenants of such flats and other dwellings. Various parts of the act came into force on dates between February 1988 and April 1989.

- Certain qualifying tenants were given the right of first refusal to purchase their landlord's interest on a relevant disposal.
- There was provision for the court to appoint managers to assume responsibility for the management of the premises containing flats where the landlord was in breach of any obligation owed to a tenant.
- Certain qualifying tenants were given the right to acquire their landlord's interest without his consent by making application to the county court.
- Any party to a long lease was given the right to make an application to the county court for an order varying the terms of the lease.
- Substantial changes were made to the service charge provisions in the Landlord and Tenant Act 1985. Service charges were to be held in trust, tenants were to be given additional rights as to insurance and recognized tenants' associations were to be consulted about managing agents.
- A residential tenant's right to information about the landlord was extended. The Rent (Relief from Phasing) Order 1987 removed the requirement to phase the increase in registered rents under the Rent Act I977 and for statutory tenancies under the Rent (Agriculture) Act 1976 but did not alter the phasing arrangements for housing association tenancies. They followed suit sometime later. However, increases in rent for first registrations of old decontrolled tenancies still remained subject to phasing.

== De-regulation 1989 ==
=== Freedom of contract ===
From 15 January 1989 two systems were intended to operate side by side: one under the Rent Act 1977 and the other under the Housing Act 1988 depending upon whether the tenancy commenced before or after that date.

==== Assured tenancies ====
For all new tenancies, with a few exceptions, this new act introduced:

- assured periodic tenancies and provisions for the determination of their rents by rent assessment committees;
- assured shorthold tenancies and provisions for the reference of excessive rents to rent assessment committees; and
- assured agricultural occupancies

==== Stronger penalties ====
It strengthened the penalties for harassment and unlawful eviction by a system of damages by making amendments to the Protection from Eviction Act 1977. In an obscure comer (Schedule I7 "Minor and consequential amendments") it removed the final remaining provision for the phasing of increases of rent - for housing association tenants.

==== Succession and other changes ====
The right to succession of statutory tenants was restricted, provision was made for the transfer of public sector tenancies to certain private sector landlords, Housing for Wales was established having functions relating to housing associations. The act set up housing action trusts, made amendments to the right to buy, and provisions as to repair notices.

In Schedule 2 Part I there were mandatory grounds in which a court must order possession of an assured tenancy and other grounds in Part II in which a court may order possession. The Ground 8 of Part I dealt with the amount of arrears at the date of the court hearing. The amounts were reduced in the Housing Act 1996.

=== Housing benefit subsidy 1988 ===
But besides introducing changes that, in the long term, affected the future of the rent officer's role, the Housing Act 1988 created important new additional functions relating to the assessment of housing benefit subsidy.

Previously, housing benefit had been administered by local authorities. There was strong evidence nationally of substantial fraudulent collusion between landlords and tenants when their tenants were claiming housing benefit. The resulting higher rents were also having an effect to increase open market rent levels for those not claiming housing benefit. Many millions of pounds of benefit subsidy were saved in the first year alone of Rent Officer intervention. Although rent officers, to cut costs, were discouraged from inspecting premises before making a valuation, inspections were made whenever resources were available and certainly where the property was unknown to them or where the amount of rent being paid seemed unreasonable for the known accommodation. Many fraudulent claims were discovered as a result of these inspections.

The Secretary of State was given powers to require rent officers to carry out these functions by statutory instrument. These have proved much easier to produce and amend to promote efficient working arrangements (rather than the longer timetable required to produce acts of Parliament).

The original order and an amendment were made in 1989. The main order was the Rent Officers (Additional Functions) Order 1990 (SI 1990/428), which established procedures by which a rent officer, upon receipt of an application from a local authority, was required to determine whether the rent payable under an assured tenancy by a housing benefit claimant, was significantly above the market rent. The availability of housing benefit was to be disregarded and an informal definition was to ask what rent someone not claiming housing benefit would be willing to pay from their own pocket for the accommodation. Tight timetables to be achieved in returning decisions (within four days or seven days where an inspection was necessary) so as not to create delays in payment of benefit during this additional process.

The rent officer was also required to determine whether the dwelling exceeded the size criteria set out in the order, which included consideration of the size of the household and the ages of its members. If the dwelling did exceed the criteria, the rent officer must determine a rent that accords with the size criteria for the occupiers.

There were provisions for a re-determination at the request of the local authority. The matter was to be dealt with by a maximum of two rent officers from adjoining registration areas who were to be advised by a rent officer from the original registration area (but not the person who made the original decision).

Further amendments were introduced by the Rent Officer (Additional Functions) (Amendment) Orders of 1991, 1993, 1994 and 1995 amongst which there was a requirement to decide whether the rent payable was exceptionally high for the size of that accommodation in that locality. If it was, then the rent officer was required to determine a market rent that was not exceptionally high for a similar sized property.

When services are performed or facilities provided or rights made available to the tenant the rent officer was initially required to make a separate determination of that part of the rent attributable to those services. Later this was changed so that it was not required to distinguish the amounts for furniture, meals or fuel charges.

=== House renovation grants 1989 ===
Grants for the repair and improvement of residential premises were amongst many other provisions in the Local Government and Housing Act 1989. These new renovation grants were also available for common parts of buildings; for the provision for facilities for the disabled; for the improvement or repair of (and conversion of houses into) houses in multiple occupation; and minor works such as thermal insulation.

Local authorities were given the opportunity to seek and act upon the advice of Rent Officers about the amount of the rent payable and of any increase in the rent payable, if the premises were already let. If unlet, advice could be sought and acted upon, of the amount of rent that might reasonably be expected to be obtained when the premises were let on an assured tenancy. Amendment was made to the Housing Act 1988 to include these additional functions for Rent Officers. A Statutory instrument later established the required procedures. Local authorities were empowered to seek the advice of rent officers for information to facilitate the calculation of grant payable. In respect of Scotland, there were further provisions in relation to the phasing progression to the registered rent for houses let by housing associations or Scottish Homes.

Long standing, low rent tenancies entered into after section 186 of the act came into force were to become assured tenancies when those long tenancies came to an end. The Rent Officer (Additional Functions) (No. 2) Order 1990 (SI 1990/1068) required rent officers to give advice (within 45 days of the application) about the rent increases which might reasonably be expected when the renovation works were completed.

From 4 January 1991, the Secretary of State for Wales exercised powers conferred by the Local Government and Housing Act 1989, and extended by the Welsh Language Act 1967, to prescribe certain forms for house renovation grants that could be submitted in the Welsh language, by statutory instrument, the Housing Renovation etc. Grant (Prescribed Forms and Particulars) Welsh Forms and Particulars) Regulations 1991 (SI 1991/80). There were further amendments in 1992 and 1994.

=== Council tax 1993 ===
The Local Government Finance (Housing) (Consequential Amendments) Order 1993 (SI 1993/1120) introduced an amendment to section 70 of the Rent Act 1977 so that the registered rent should take into account any sums payable by the tenant to the landlord in respect of council tax. Certain definitions were introduced by the Council Tax (Liability for Owners) Regulations 1992 (SI 1992/551) and subsequently amended by statutory instrument.

On 10 June 1993, the Secretary of State for Wales in exercise of powers under the Rent Act 1977 extended by the Welsh Language Act 1967, by the Rent Act 1977 (Forms etc.) (Welsh Forms and Particulars) Regulations 1993 (SI 1993/1511), made regulations that prescribed Welsh versions of the forms, which may be used in place of the English versions.

=== Enfranchisement 1993 ===
The Leasehold Reform, Housing and Urban Development Act 1993 amongst many other provisions conferred rights to collective enfranchisement and lease renewal on tenants of flats and enfranchisement by tenants of houses. Decisions were to be made by leasehold valuation tribunals. Provision was made for auditing the management and service charges claimed for residential property and to promote codes of good management practice.

The Family Law Act 1996 (which made provision with respect to divorce and separation and legal aid in connection with mediation in disputes relating to family matters) included legislation dealing with the right of occupation of certain domestic premises and the transfer of tenancies between spouses and persons who have lived together as husband and wife.

The Housing Act 1996 included provisions about the social rented sector; houses in multiple occupation; the administration of housing benefit, the conduct of tenants, the allocation of housing by local housing authorities and homelessness.

A landlord may not now exercise a right of re-entry or forfeiture for failure to pay a service charge unless it has been agreed by the tenant or has been the subject of a determination by a court or appeal tribunal. New rules were made about the determination of reasonableness of service charges and the rights upon application by a tenants' association to appoint a surveyor to advise on service charges, amending the Landlord and Tenant Act 1985. The power to appoint of a manager of property was transferred from the courts to a leasehold valuation tribunal by amendments to the Landlord and Tenant Act 1987.

Section 122 enabled the Secretary of State by making a statutory order (to be made by statutory instrument) to require Rent Officers to carry out specified functions in connection with housing benefit and rent allowance subsidy. It enabled a prospective landlord to apply to the Rent Officer for a determination for the purposes of any application for housing benefit made by a tenant of a dwelling that the landlord proposes to let.

A local authority or a housing action trust were given the right to elect to operate an introductory tenancy regime. Introductory tenancies (and licences to occupy) were to be granted to tenants for a trial period. There were provisions for succession to introductory tenancies after the death of the tenant to the tenant's spouse or a member of his family who had resided with the tenant in the previous twelve months.

Chapter III gave power to the High Court or a county court on application by a local authority to grant injunctions against anti-social behaviour and gave the power of arrest for breach of injunctions. Some of the provisions of this act came into force on royal assent, some two months later and some on a day in the future to be appointed by order of the Secretary of State. Some provisions additionally applied to the Isles of Scilly, Northern Island and Scotland but not all.

The Housing Grants, Construction and Regeneration Act 1996 made provision for renovation grants and other assistance for housing purposes for the improvement or repair of dwellings, houses in multiple occupation or the common parts of buildings containing one or more flats. It incorporated disabled facilities grants for the provision of facilities for a disabled person. Buildings had to be more than ten years old.

There were to be grants and other assistance for regeneration and development and in connection with clearance areas, home energy efficiency schemes. Grants were to be made available to home owners where the occupiers were entitled to social benefits and home repair assistance for mobile home or houseboat owners. Rent Officers continued to give advice to local authorities as they had done previously in the administration of house renovation grants. This statutory function ceased in 2000.

== Maximum Fair Rent Order ==
The Rents Act (Maximum Fair Rent) Order 1999 (SI 1999/6) came into force on 1 February 1999. The rent officer continued to determine a fair rent as previously but was then required to calculate by a formula the maximum rent payable if this was lower than the fair rent. The formula required a comparison between the retail price index at the date of the previous registration and the retail price index for the month immediately preceding the new determination of a fair rent. There was an addition of 0.075 for the first registration after this new order came into force and 0.05 for every subsequent registration. Variable service charges were not included in the calculation of the formula.

The Maximum Fair Rent did not apply where there had been a change in the condition of the dwelling house of the common parts as a result of repairs or improvements carried out by the landlord if the new rent determined as a result of these repairs or improvements exceeded the previous registered rent by at least 15%. The Maximum Fair Rent was to be recalculated if the rent registered by the Rent Officer upon an application made on or after 1 February 1999, was referred to a rent assessment committee. The Retail Prices Index used by rent officers and rent assessment committees is the monthly United Kingdom Index of Retail Prices (for all items), which is calculated by the Office for National Statistics.

The Rent Officer Service through the Institute of Rent Officers had been consulted in the past about legislative changes and procedures. Suggestions were made through annual reports most of which were eventually incorporated into legislation. One such recommendation was the creation of a nation service either as an executive agency or as a non-departmental public body (NDPB).

The Rent Officer Service was established as the Rent Service as an executive agency of the Department of the Environment, Transport and the Regions on 1 October 1999. Significant opportunities for service improvements were able to be made in line with the government's modernising objectives. The Rent Service became a single, national service with local delivery, building on existing experience to secure better performance and improved customer service. The new organisation focused on faster processing of cases and consistency in valuation practice and decision making. New information technology systems were introduced and greater openness and accountability was promoted whilst maintaining impartiality in valuations.

As no new protected tenancies had been created after 15 January 1989 after the Housing Act 1988 fewer applications for fair rents were received in most areas of the country except in central London. There had however been a substantial increase in housing benefit valuations, and on 1 April 2004 the Rent Service was transferred to the Department for Work and Pensions DWP), which was the government department responsible for housing benefit legislation.

A major change to the valuation process for housing benefit was the Local Housing Allowance (LHA) a flat rate allowance paid to housing benefit claimants, which was introduced on 7 April 2008 as part of the welfare reform programme. It applies to private sector tenants who make a new claim for housing benefit or those claiming housing benefit who change address. It will also apply to tenants claiming housing benefit who move from the social sector into private sector accommodation. LHA is a standard allowance based on the number of bedrooms: shared room (room in a shared property); one bedroom, two bedrooms, three bedrooms, four bedrooms and five bedrooms, in an area known as a Broad Rental Market Area (BRMA). It is the median rent of private sector lettings for that size of accommodation in the BRMA.

The BRMA is a geographical area where a person could reasonably be expected to live, taking into account access to facilities and services for the purpose of health, education, recreation, personal banking and shopping. The distance of travel to and from those facilities by public and private transport is taken into account and local authorities are consulted when BRMA are reviewed. BRMA boundaries do not have to match the boundaries of a local authority and often fall across more than one local authority area.

The key to the success of this LHA is the regular review of the BRMA across England by the rent officers and the extensive development of lettings information now held by the Rent Service. BRMA decisions and LHA levels are published monthly on a new web portal. The published data includes full details and rationales for the BRMA and the list of rents gathered for each property size in that BRMA. On 1 April 2009 the residual functions of the Rent Service were transferred to become a part of the Valuation Office Agency.

Changes to the local housing allowance were announced in the June 2010 budget. The first changes are planned to come into effect between April 2011 and October 2011. The VOA rent officers now provide the BRMA and lettings data on a new facility for London.

== Case law regarding rent control ==
In 1999, the House of Lords found in Fitzpatrick v Sterling Housing Association Ltd that a protected tenancy could be passed on to a gay cohabiting partner (before the availability of either civil partnerships or same-sex marriage) as the couple could be considered a "family" under the Rent Act 1977.

== See also ==
- English land law
- English trusts law
- Land tenure in England
