= Increase of Rent and Mortgage Interest (Restrictions) Act 1920 =

Act of the Parliament of the United Kingdom

Increase of Rent and Mortgage Interest (Restrictions) Act 1920 (Note: Section 19(1).)
- Act of Parliament
- Parliament of the United Kingdom
- Long title: An Act to consolidate and amend the Law with respect to the increase of rent and recovery of possession of premises in certain cases, and the increase of the rate of interest on, and the calling in of securities on such premises, and for purposes in connection therewith.
- Citation: 10 & 11 Geo. 5. c. 17
- Territorial extent: United Kingdom

Dates
- Royal assent: 2 July 1920
- Commencement: 2 July 1920 (Note: The Acts of Parliament (Commencement) Act 1793.)
- Repealed: England and Wales: 8 June 1968; Scotland: 12 August 1971; Northern Ireland: 1 October 1978 (Note: The Rent (1978 Order) (Commencement) Order (Northern Ireland) 1978 (SI 1978/1050).)
Other legislation
| Amends | See § Repealed enactments |
| Repeals/revokes | See § Repealed enactments |
| Amended by | Increase of Rent and Mortgage Interest Restrictions (Continuance) Act 1923; Rent and Mortgage Interest Restrictions Act 1923; Prevention of Eviction Act 1924; Rent and Mortgage Interest (Restrictions Continuation) Act 1925; Rating and Valuation Act 1925; Rent and Mortgage Interest Restrictions (Amendment) Act 1933; Increase of Rent and Mortgage Interest (Restrictions) Act 1935; Increase of Rent and Mortgage Interest (Restrictions) Act 1938; Rent and Mortgage Interest Restrictions Act 1939; Landlord and Tenant (Rent Control) Act 1949; Crown Lessees (Protection of Sub-Tenants) Act 1952; Administration of Justice Act 1956; Rent Act 1957; Rent Act 1965 |
| Repealed by | England and Wales: Rent Act 1968; Scotland: Rent (Scotland) Act 1971; Northern Ireland: Rent (Northern Ireland) Order 1978 |
| Relates to | Furnished Houses (Rent Control) Act 1946; Landlord and Tenant (Furniture and Fittings) Act 1959 |

Status: Repealed

Text of statute as originally enacted

The Increase of Rent and Mortgage Interest (Restrictions) Act 1920 (10 & 11 Geo. 5. c. 17) was an act of the Parliament of the United Kingdom that consolidated and amended enactments relating to the increase of rent and the rate of interest on mortgages on residential premises in the United Kingdom.

== Provisions ==
=== Repealed enactments ===
Section 19(3) of the act repealed 4 enactments, listed in the second schedule to the act.

| Citation | Short title | Extent of repeal |
|---|---|---|
| 5 & 6 Geo. 5. c. 97 | Increase of Rent and Mortgage Interest (War Restrictions) Act 1915 | The whole act. |
| 7 & 8 Geo. 5. c. 25 | Courts (Emergency Powers) Act 1917 | Ss. 4, 5 and 7. |
| 9 & 10 Geo. 5. c. 7 | Increase of Rent and Mortgage Interest (Restrictions) Act 1919 | The whole act. |
| 9 & 10 Geo. 5. c. 90 | Increase of Rent, &c. (Amendment) Act 1919 | The whole act. |

== Subsequent developments ==
The whole act was repealed for England and Wales by section 117(5) of, and schedule 17 to, the Rent Act 1968 (c. 23), which came into force on 8 June 1968.

The whole act was repealed for Scotland by section 135(5) of, and schedule 20 to, the Rent (Scotland) Act 1971 (c. 28), which came into force on 12 August 1971.

The whole act was repealed for Northern Ireland by Rent (Northern Ireland) Order 1978 (SI 1978/1050), which came into force on 1 October 1978.
