= Leasehold valuation tribunal =

Leasehold Valuation Tribunal (LVT)

A leasehold valuation tribunal (LVT) was a statutory tribunal in England which determined various types of landlord and tenant dispute involving residential property in the private sector. An LVT consisted of a panel of three; one with a background in property law (generally a solicitor); one with a background in property valuation generally a qualified surveyor; and a layman, although some decisions of an LVT were decided by a single member. LVTs were non-departmental public bodies.

The leasehold valuation tribunals were abolished under the Transfer of Tribunal Functions Order 2013 and their functions were transferred to the Property Chamber of the newly created First-tier Tribunal with effect from 1 July 2013.

== Jurisdiction ==
Leasehold valuation tribunals had a number of jurisdictions including:

- Determining the price to be paid by tenants compulsorily acquiring either the freehold of houses or lease extensions of flats or collectively exercising the right to purchase the freehold of a collection of flats
- Determination of whether a service charge is payable
- Granting dispensations to landlords from compliance with statutory consultation with respect to service charges
- On a tenant's application, preventing the landlord from treating costs of proceedings as relevant costs (i.e. from adding them to the tenant's service charge bill)
- The appointment of managers and receivers for flats improperly managed
- Determining whether a leaseholder is in breach of a term of their lease other than one to pay rent or a service or administration charge for the purposes of permitting the landlord to take steps to forfeit the lease
- Variation of long leases of flats

== History ==
Initially created by the Housing Act 1980 which transferred jurisdiction from the Lands Tribunal (a superior tribunal of England and Wales), functions were expanded by the Leasehold Reform, Housing and Urban Development Act 1993 and the Commonhold and Leasehold Reform Act 2002.

=== Lease extension ===
One of the earliest functions of the LVT was to determine disputes concerning the extension of leases.

One of the drawbacks of owning a flat on a long lease is that it reduces in value over time. The less time is left on the lease, the less valuable the property becomes. Because of this, the law (the Leasehold Reform Housing and Urban Development Act 1993) gives the leaseholder the right to extend their lease once they have owned it for two years.

Historically, when a lease ran out the property held thereunder would revert to the possession of the landlord/freeholder. In this case, the job of the leasehold valuation tribunal was to hear evidence from both sides as to what the long leasehold value of such a property would be and to determine what proportions of the value of the said property should rightfully be ascribed to leaseholder and the freeholder under the legislation. Generally, such evidence was given by an expert witness for each side who will argue that a particular value is more applicable based on an analysis of recent sales of comparable properties around the date that the Leasehold Notice was served.

In many parts of the UK there are substantial freeholders who historically have owned and continue to own large land holdings, and this ownership has been and continues to be passed under leased ownership to sub-landlords and leaseholders; this system was particularly suitable when areas of London were initially built on greenfield land, and later in the period immediately after the Second World War, when considerable renovation and rebuilding was urgently required, the estates were able to effectively subcontract redevelopment to sub-landlords, known as head-lessors.

The most notable London estates are those of the Crown Estate, the Duke of Westminster, Earl Cadogan, and Lord Howard de Walden; with the changes in legislation these freeholders are now obliged to sell lease extensions under the various Acts of Parliament which have been passed at prices agreed by negotiation or determined by a leasehold valuation tribunal. Appeals against decisions of a leasehold valuation tribunal are made to the Lands Tribunal.

== Composition ==
Tribunals technically comprised members drawn from one of the five rent assessment panels of England, constituted under schedule 10 of the Rent Act 1977. Such members also sat on rent assessment committees which determined Fair Rents under s. 70 of the Rent Act 1977, rent tribunals under the same Act which determined rents payable under Restricted Contracts (room lettings) and residential property tribunals which were created by the Housing Act 2004.

A legally qualified chairman sitting with a Chartered Surveyor and a lay member usually constituted the tribunal. However, a small number of chairmen were chartered surveyors and a small number of members of other professions were appointed to sit. Chairmen were appointed by the Lord Chancellor and other members by the Secretary of State.

== In Wales ==
Leasehold Valuation Tribunals still exist in Wales as a sitting of the Residential Property Tribunal Wales. They hear disputes regarding leaseholds, including service charges, enfranchisement, and recognition of tenants' associations.
