= Housing (Financial Provisions) (Scotland) Act 1968 =

Act of the Parliament of the United Kingdom

Housing (Financial Provisions) (Scotland) Act 1968 (Note: Section 71(1).)
- Act of Parliament
- Parliament of the United Kingdom
- Long title: An Act to consolidate certain enactments relating to the giving of financial assistance towards the provision or improvement of housing accommodation in Scotland, and to other financial matters connected therewith.
- Citation: 1968 c. 31
- Territorial extent: Scotland (Note: Section 71(3).)

Dates
- Royal assent: 30 May 1968
- Commencement: 30 August 1968 (Note: Section 71(2).)

Other legislation
- Amends: See § Repealed enactments
- Repeals/revokes: See § Repealed enactments
- Amended by: Housing (Scotland) Act 1969; Statute Law (Repeals) Act 1974; Housing (Scotland) Act 1974; Statute Law (Repeals) Act 1981; Housing (Scotland) Act 1987

Status: Partially repealed

Text of statute as originally enacted

Revised text of statute as amended

Text of the Housing (Financial Provisions) (Scotland) Act 1968 as in force today (including any amendments) within the United Kingdom, from legislation.gov.uk.

The Housing (Financial Provisions) (Scotland) Act 1968 (c. 31) is an act of the Parliament of the United Kingdom that consolidated enactments relating to financial assistance towards the provision or improvement of housing accommodation in Scotland.

== Provisions ==
=== Repealed enactments ===
Section 70(1) of the act repealed 12 enactments, listed in the schedule 10 to the act.

Citation	Short title	Extent of repeal
14 Geo. 6. c. 34	Housing (Scotland) Act 1950	Section 1. Section 75. Sections 77 and 78. Sections 89 and 90. Section 92. Section 109. Sections 111 to 119. Section 122. In section 123, the words from "or arrangements" to "Part of this Act". In section 126, subsections (1), (3) and (4). In section 127, subsections (3) and (4). In section 128, subsections (2) and (3). Section 130. Section 132. Sections 137 to 142. Sections 167 and 168. Sections 174 to 176. Sections 182 and 183. Schedule 6. Schedule 8. Schedule 10.
15 & 16 Geo. 6 & 1 Eliz. 2. c. 63	Housing (Scotland) Act 1952	In section 1, subsection (4). Sections 3 and 4. Sections 6 and 7. In section 9, subsections (1) and (2), in subsection (3) the words "and subsection (6) of section one hundred and eleven of the principal Act" and the words "and, in the case of the said subsection (6), section three of this Act", subsections (4) and (6).
2 & 3 Eliz. 2. c. 50	Housing (Repairs and Rents) (Scotland) Act 1954	Section 4. Sections 9 to 11. In section 43, the words "or section one hundred and sixteen or section one hundred and seventy of the Housing (Scotland) Act 1950".
3 & 4 Eliz. 2. c. 21	Crofters (Scotland) Act 1955	In section 22(8), the words "and subsection (6) of section one hundred and eleven" and the words "and subsection (5) of section three of the Housing (Scotland) Act 1952".
5 & 6 Eliz. 2. c. 25	Rent Act 1957	In section 10(2), paragraph (d).
5 & 6 Eliz. 2. c. 38	Housing and Town Development (Scotland) Act 1957	Section 4. In section 5, subsection (1). Section 21. In section 27(1), the words "or in Part I of the Housing (Repairs and Rents) (Scotland) Act 1954". In Schedule 1, paragraphs 5, 6, 8 and 10 to 12.
7 & 8 Eliz. 2. c. 33	House Purchase and Housing Act 1959	In section 3, in subsection (1) the words "and paragraph (b) of subsection (3) of section seventy-five of the Act of 1950", and in subsection (2) the words "and of the said section seventy-five" and the words "which or of". Sections 19 and 20. Sections 22 to 24. In section 25, the words "and section one hundred and ten of the Act of 1950 (which makes similar provision as respects Scotland)". In section 29, in subsection (1) in the definition of "improvement grant" the words "or under section one hundred and eleven of the Act of 1950", and in subsection (2) the words "and, in Scotland, section 5 of the Housing (Scotland) Act 1966". In section 31(1), the words from "and the Act of 1950" to the end. In section 32(4), the words "and Part II of the First Schedule thereto". In Schedule 1, Part II.
10 & 11 Eliz. 2. c. 28	Housing (Scotland) Act 1962	Section 8. Sections 11 to 13. Section 15. In section 16, the words "and section one hundred and eighteen of the Act of 1950 (which relates to the increase of rent under Part VII of that Act in certain cases)". Sections 17 and 18. In section 19, subsection (1). In section 32(1), paragraph (b) and the words "or, as the case may be, by whom it may be occupied". In Schedule 4, paragraph 4, in paragraph 6 the words from "and Part I of the Sixth Schedule" to the end, paragraphs 32 to 34 and paragraph 36.
1964 c. 56	Housing Act 1964	In section 11, subsection (2). Sections 45 to 49. Section 55. Sections 61 and 62. In section 63, subsection (2). In section 92, subsection (7), and, in subsection (10), paragraph (h). Section 96. In section 97, subsection (2). Section 99. Section 101(2). Section 103.
1965 c. 40	Housing (Amendment) (Scotland) Act 1965	The whole act.
1966 c. 49	Housing (Scotland) Act 1966	In section 86(7), the words "transitional and other supplementary provisions, including". In section 208(1), the definition of "Exchequer contribution". In Schedule 9, the amendment of sections 137 and 138 of the Housing (Scotland) Act 1950 and the amendment of section 29(2) of the House Purchase and Housing Act 1959.
1967 c. 20	Housing (Financial Provisions, Etc.) (Scotland) Act 1967	In section 1, subsections (1) to (3). Sections 2 to 10. In section 11, in subsection (1) the words "The provisions of this section shall have effect with respect to annual contributions, and", and subsections (2) to (6). Sections 12 to 15. In section 16, subsection (2). In section 17, in subsection (1) the definitions of "approved house", "authorised arrangements made with a local authority" and "relevant financial year", and subsection (2). In section 21(1), the words from "so however" to the end. Schedules 1 and 2. Schedule 4. In Schedule 5, paragraphs 5, 7 to 9, 12 and 13.

== Subsequent developments ==
The greater part of the act was repealed by section 339(3) of, and schedule 24 to, the Housing (Scotland) Act 1987 (c. 26), which came into force on 15 August 1987, with the exception of sections 20, 67 and 71 of the act.
