= RPTS =

RPTS can mean:

- Reformed Presbyterian Theological Seminary
- Republican Party of Labour and Justice, or Respublikanskaya partiya truda i spravedlivosti
- Residential Property Tribunal Service
- Russian Orthodox Church (РПЦ)
