= Rent control in Scotland =

Rent control in Scotland is based upon the statutory codes relating to private sector residential tenancies. Although not strictly within the private sector, tenancies granted by housing associations, etc., are dealt with as far as is appropriate in this context. Controlling prices, along with security of tenure and oversight by an independent regulator or the courts, is a part of rent regulation.

Regarding Rent Act 1977 legislation, when the legislation deals solely with the law applicable to private sector residential tenancies, the act usually covers, mutatis mutantis, both Scotland and England and Wales; but when the legislation also covers other matters, it is more customary for separate parallel acts to be promoted. Examples of the first category are all the pre-1939 war Acts and the Rent Act 1957, Rent Act 1965, and Rent Act 1974; and of the second, the Housing Act 1980, in Scotland this is the Tenant's Rights Etc. (Scotland) Act 1980; and the Housing Act 1988, in Scotland this is the Housing (Scotland) Act 1988.

In September 2022, the Sturgeon government capped rent rises to 3% and enacted an eviction moratorium in response to the cost-of-living crisis. In February 2024, Living Rent sent an open letter to Humza Yousaf arguing that the removal of protections would have "disastrous consequences" and that renters had been "pushed to the edge". The measures ended on 31 March 2024.

== See also ==
- Tenancy deposit schemes (Scotland)
