= Landlord and Tenant (Rent Control) Act 1949 =

Act of the Parliament of the United Kingdom

Landlord and Tenant (Rent Control) Act 1949 (Note: Section 18(1).)
- Act of Parliament
- Parliament of the United Kingdom
- Long title: An Act to provide in certain cases for the determination by a Tribunal of standard rents for the purposes of the Rent and Mortgage Interest Restrictions Acts, 1920 to 1939; further to restrict the requiring of premiums in connection with tenancies to which those Acts apply; to make further provision for the purposes of those Acts where the tenant shares part of his accommodation with his landlord or other persons or sublets part of his dwelling-house furnished; to amend the Rent of Furnished Houses Control (Scotland) Act, 1943, and the Furnished Houses (Rent Control) Act, 1946, as respects security of tenure and the requiring of premiums and as respects the districts for which Tribunals are constituted; to make certain minor amendments of the said Acts in so far as they apply to Scotland; and for purposes connected with the matters aforesaid.
- Citation: 12, 13 & 14 Geo. 6. c. 40
- Territorial extent: England and Wales; Scotland; (Note: Section 18(3).)

Dates
- Royal assent: 2 June 1949
- Commencement: 2 June 1949 (Note: The Acts of Parliament (Commencement) Act 1793.)
- Repealed: England and Wales: 8 June 1968; Scotland: 12 August 1971
Other legislation
Amends	Rent of Furnished Houses Control (Scotland) Act 1943; Furnished Houses (Rent Control) Act 1946
Amended by	Rent Act 1957; Rent Act 1965
Repealed by	England and Wales: Rent Act 1968; Scotland: Rent (Scotland) Act 1971

Status: Repealed

Text of statute as originally enacted

The Landlord and Tenant (Rent Control) Act 1949 (12, 13 & 14 Geo. 6. c. 40) was an act of the Parliament of the United Kingdom, intended to control excessive rents being charged by landlords. It extended the provisions of the Furnished Houses (Rent Control) Act 1946 (9 & 10 Geo. 6. c. 34).

The major new provisions of the act were:

- The protection of the Rent Restriction Acts was given to both landlords and tenants sharing certain types of accommodation.
- Rent tribunals were given the power to extend the security of lease given to tenants indefinitely, in three-month periods, and to review lettings made for the first time since September 1939.
- Tribunals could now review the premiums paid for accommodation as well as the rent itself, and payments for furniture and other articles. Excess premiums could be recoverable by a reduction in rent.

== Subsequent developments ==
The whole act was repealed for England and Wales by section 117(5) of, and schedule 17 to, the Rent Act 1968 (c. 23), which came into force on 8 June 1968.

The whole act was repealed for Scotland by section 135(5) of, and schedule 20 to, the Rent (Scotland) Act 1971 (c. 28), which came into force on 12 August 1971.

== See also ==
- Rent regulation
- English land law

== Bibliography ==
- Facts and Figures for Socialists, 1951, chapter 27. Labour Party Research Department, London, 1950
