= Rent (Scotland) Act 1971 =

Act of the Parliament of the United Kingdom

Rent (Scotland) Act 1971 (Note: Section 136(1).)
- Act of Parliament
- Parliament of the United Kingdom
- Long title: An Act to consolidate in relation to Scotland the Rent and Mortgage Interest Restrictions Acts 1920 to 1939, the Rent of Furnished Houses Control (Scotland) Act 1943, The Landlord and Tenant (Rent Control) Act 1949, Part II of the Housing (Repairs and Rents) (Scotland) Act 1954, the Rent Act 1957, the Rent Act 1965 (except Part III thereof), Part IV of the Housing (Scotland) Act 1969 and other related enactments.
- Citation: 1971 c. 28
- Territorial extent: Scotland (Note: Section 136(3).)

Dates
- Royal assent: 12 May 1971
- Commencement: 12 August 1971 (Note: Section 136(2).)
Other legislation
Amends	See § Repealed enactments
Repeals/revokes	See § Repealed enactments
Amended by	Fire Precautions Act 1971; Tribunals and Inquiries Act 1971; Rent Act 1974; Rent (Scotland) Act 1984
Relates to	Rent Act 1968

Status: Partially repealed

Text of statute as originally enacted

Revised text of statute as amended

Text of the Rent (Scotland) Act 1971 as in force today (including any amendments) within the United Kingdom, from legislation.gov.uk.

The Rent (Scotland) Act 1971 (c. 28) is an act of the Parliament of the United Kingdom that consolidated enactments related to rent control in Scotland.

The Rent Act 1968 made similar provisions for England and Wales.

== Provisions ==
=== Repealed enactments ===
Section 135(5) of the act repealed 28 enactments, listed in schedule 20 to the act.

Enactments repealed by section 135(5)
Citation	Short title	Extent of repeal
10 & 11 Geo. 5. c. 17	Increase of Rent and Mortgage Interest (Restrictions) Act 1920	The whole act.
13 & 14 Geo. 5. c. 13	Rent Restrictions (Notices of Increase) Act 1923	The whole act.
13 & 14 Geo. 5. c. 32	Rent and Mortgage Interest Restrictions Act 1923	The whole act.
14 & 15 Geo. 5. c. 18	Prevention of Eviction Act 1924	The whole act.
15 & 16 Geo. 5. c. 32	Rent and Mortgage Interest (Restrictions Continuation) Act 1925	The whole act.
23 & 24 Geo. 5. c. 32	Rent and Mortgage Interest Restrictions (Amendment) Act 1933	The whole act.
25 & 26 Geo. 5. c. 13	Increase of Rent and Mortgage Interest (Restrictions) Act 1935	The whole act.
1 & 2 Geo. 6. c. 26	Increase of Rent and Mortgage Interest (Restrictions) Act 1938	The whole act.
2 & 3 Geo. 6. c. 71	Rent and Mortgage Interest Restrictions Act 1939	The whole act.
6 & 7 Geo. 6. c. 44	Rent of Furnished Houses Control (Scotland) Act 1943	The whole act.
12 & 13 Geo. 6. c. 40	Landlord and Tenant (Rent Control) Act 1949	The whole act.
14 Geo. 6. c. 34	Housing (Scotland) Act 1950	Sections 120 and 125.
14 & 15 Geo. 6. c. 65	Reserve and Auxiliary Forces (Protection of Civil Interests) Act 1951	In section 15, subsection (5). In section 19, subsections (3), (4) and (6). In section 64(1), the definition beginning "Rent Restrictions Acts".
15 & 16 Geo. 6 & 1 Eliz. 2. c. 40	Crown Lessees (Protection of Sub-Tenants) Act 1952	The whole act.
1 & 2 Eliz. 2. c. 47	Emergency Laws (Miscellaneous Provisions) Act 1953	In Schedule 1, paragraph 4.
2 & 3 Eliz. 2. c. 50	Housing (Repairs and Rents) (Scotland) Act 1954	Part II.
4 & 5 Eliz. 2. c. 60	Valuation and Rating (Scotland) Act 1956	Section 41. Schedules 1 to 3. In Schedule 3, paragraphs 6 to 8.
5 & 6 Eliz. 2. c. 25	Rent Act 1957	The whole act.
7 & 8 Eliz. 2. c. 64	Landlord and Tenant (Furniture and Fittings) Act 1959	The whole act.
10 & 11 Eliz. 2. c. 28	Housing (Scotland) Act 1962	Section 16.
1964 c. 56	Housing Act 1964	Section 3(9). Section 107(c).
1964 c. 97	Protection from Eviction Act 1964	Section 5.
1965 c. 75	Rent Act 1965	Parts I, II and IV. Sections 43 and 46. Section 47(1) and (2). Sections 50 to 52. Schedules 1 to 7.
1966 c. 49	Housing (Scotland) Act 1966	In section 208(1), the definition of "the Rent Acts".
1967 c. 20	Housing (Financial Provisions &c.) (Scotland) Act 1967	Section 19.
1967 c. 22	Agriculture Act 1967	Section 38.
1969 c. 34	Housing (Scotland) Act 1969	Sections 44 to 57. Section 61. Schedules 3 and 4. In Schedule 6, the entry relating to the Housing (Repairs and Rents) (Scotland) Act 1954.
1970 c. 40	Agriculture Act 1970	Section 101.

== Subsequent developments ==
The whole act, except part II of Schedule 18, was repealed by section 117(3) of, and schedule 10 to, the Rent (Scotland) Act 1984, which came into force on 31 January 1985.
