= Residential Property Tribunal Service =

Former property tribunals administration service

The Residential Property Tribunal Service (or RPTS) was an administrative organisation which provided support for three statutory tribunals and five regional rent assessment panels in England, all of which make decisions on residential property matters.

Its tribunals were replaced by the First-tier Tribunal from 1 July 2013, by the Transfer of Tribunal Functions Order 2013. As such the RPTS's functions passed to His Majesty's Courts and Tribunals Service.

The tribunals which formed part of the RPTS are:

- Rent assessment committees
- Leasehold valuation tribunals
- Residential property tribunals

== Senior presidents ==
The RPTS was led by a senior president:

- 2008-2013: Siobhan McGrath (became president of the FtT Property Chamber)
