= Furnished Houses (Rent Control) Act 1946 =

Act of the Parliament of the United Kingdom

Furnished Houses (Rent Control) Act 1946 (Note: Section 13(1).)
- Act of Parliament
- Parliament of the United Kingdom
- Long title: An Act to make provision with respect to the rent of houses or parts thereof let at a rent which includes payment for the use of furniture or for services.
- Citation: 9 & 10 Geo. 6. c. 34
- Territorial extent: England and Wales (Note: Section 13(2).)

Dates
- Royal assent: 26 March 1946
- Commencement: 26 March 1946 (Note: The Acts of Parliament (Commencement) Act 1793.)
- Expired: 31 December 1947 (Note: Section 13(3).)
- Repealed: 8 June 1968
Other legislation
Amended by	Landlord and Tenant (Rent Control) Act 1949; Crown Lessees (Protection of Sub-Tenants) Act 1952; Rent Act 1957; Rent Act 1965
Repealed by	Rent Act 1968

Status: Repealed

Text of statute as originally enacted

The Furnished Houses (Rent Control) Act 1946 (9 & 10 Geo. 6. c. 34) was an act of the Parliament of the United Kingdom that set up rent tribunals to control rents in the private sector and regulated renting prices. Following the Second World War, the practice of limiting rent prices had been introduced due to the scarcity of rented property, which made it a "seller's market".

The act was intended to stop the high prices in furnished properties being rented out; as they were furnished, they were not covered by previous Rent Acts. It was given royal assent on 26 March 1946. The act was heavily influenced by the Ridley Committee, established to investigate rent control methods, which reported in 1945.

== Subsequent developments ==
The act set up rent assessment committees, which were given to districts following a consultation with the Minister of Health or his representative. Upon these tribunals being established in a district, they set a fixed maximum of rent for furnished dwellings, making it illegal for the landlord to charge more. The tribunals were criticised for their slow pace and for failing to charge landlords for previous exorbitant rent prices, and the act was repealed by section 117 of the Rent Act 1968.

The whole act was repealed by section 117(5) of, and schedule 17 to, the Rent Act 1968 (c. 23), which came into force on 8 June 1968.

== See also ==
- English land law
- Rent regulation

== Bibliography ==
- Francis, Martin (1997). Ideas and policies under labour, 1945–1951: building a new Britain. Manchester University Press. ISBN 0-7190-4833-8.
- Gower, L.C.B. (July 1946). "Furnished Houses (Rent Control) Act, 1946". Modern Law Review. 9 (2). Blackwell Publishing: 169–172. ISSN 0026-7961. JSTOR 1090567.
- Pollard, David; Parpworth, Neil; Hughes, David (2007). Constitutional and administrative law: text with materials (4th ed.). Oxford University Press. ISBN 978-0-19-928637-9.
