= Housing (Scotland) Act 1950 =

Act of the Parliament of the United Kingdom

Housing (Scotland) Act 1950 (Note: Section 188(1).)
- Act of Parliament
- Parliament of the United Kingdom
- Long title: An Act to consolidate the Housing (Scotland) Acts, 1925 to 1949, and certain other enactments relating to housing in Scotland.
- Citation: 14 Geo. 6. c. 34
- Territorial extent: Scotland (Note: Section 188(3).)

Dates
- Royal assent: 26 October 1950
- Commencement: 1 January 1951 (Note: Section 188(2).)
- Repealed: 15 August 1987
Other legislation
| Amends | See § Repealed enactments |
| Repeals/revokes | See § Repealed enactments |
| Amended by | Requisitioned Houses and Housing (Amendment) Act 1955; Statute Law Revision Act 1963; Industrial and Provident Societies Act 1965; Law Reform (Miscellaneous Provisions) (Scotland) Act 1966; Housing (Scotland) Act 1966; National Loans Act 1968; Housing (Financial Provisions) (Scotland) Act 1968; Rent (Scotland) Act 1971; Statute Law (Repeals) Act 1981 |
| Repealed by | Housing (Scotland) Act 1987 |

Status: Repealed

Text of statute as originally enacted

The Housing (Scotland) Act 1950 (14 Geo. 6. c. 34) was an act of the Parliament of the United Kingdom that consolidated enactments relating to housing in Scotland.

== Provisions ==
=== Repealed enactments ===
Section 187 of the act repealed 16 enactments, listed in parts I and II of the thirteenth schedule to the act.

Part I - as from commencement of the act
| Citation | Short title | Extent of repeal |
|---|---|---|
| 14 & 15 Geo. 5. c. 35 | Housing (Financial Provisions) Act 1924 | Section eight. |
| 15 & 16 Geo. 5. c. 15 | Housing (Scotland) Act 1925 | The whole act. |
| 20 & 21 Geo. 5. c. 40 | Housing (Scotland) Act 1930 | The whole act except paragraph (iv) of subsection (1) and subsection (3) of section seven, sections twenty-three and twenty-four, section forty-six, section forty-nine so far as relating to the unrepealed provisions of the Act, subsection (3) of section fifty and the Fifth Schedule so far as relating to the Housing, &c. Act 1923, and the Housing (Financial Provisions) Act 1924, and section fifty-two. |
| 25 & 26 Geo. 5. c. 44 | Housing (Scotland) Act 1935 | The whole act except sections thirty to thirty-two, sections thirty-four to thirty-six, section eighty-three, subsection (1) of section eighty-six so far as relating to the unrepealed provisions of the Act, section eighty-seven and the Fifth Schedule so far as relating to section twenty-three of the Housing (Scotland) Act 1930, and section eighty-nine. |
| 1 & 2 Geo. 6. c. 38 | Housing (Agricultural Population) (Scotland) Act 1938 | The whole act except sections one and two, section twenty-one so far as relating to the said sections one and two, section twenty-two and the Second Schedule. |
| 2 & 3 Geo. 6. c. 3 | Housing (Financial Provisions) (Scotland) Act 1938 | Sections four and six. |
| 6 & 7 Geo. 6. c. 22 | Housing (Agricultural Population) (Scotland) Act 1943 | The whole act. |
| 7 & 8 Geo. 6. c. 39 | Housing (Scotland) Act 1944 | The whole act. |
| 8 & 9 Geo. 6. c. 18 | Local Authorities Loans Act 1945 | Section six so far as relating to section seventy-two of the Housing (Scotland) Act 1925. |
| 9 & 10 Geo. 6. c. 54 | Housing (Financial Provisions) (Scotland) Act 1946 | The whole act except sections fifteen and twenty. |
| 9 & 10 Geo. 6. c. 68 | New Towns Act 1946 | Section eight, and subsection (10) of section twenty-five. |
| 10 & 11 Geo. 6. c. 43 | Local Government (Scotland) Act 1947 | Section two hundred and ninety-three. |
| 11 & 12 Geo. 6. c. 45 | Agriculture (Scotland) Act 1948 | Section seventy-eight. |
| 12 & 13 Geo. 6. c. 61 | Housing (Scotland) Act 1949 | The whole act except sections thirty-eight to forty, and subsections (1) and (2) of section forty-nine. |

Part II - as from the appointed day
| Citation | Short title | Extent of repeal |
|---|---|---|
| 3 Edw. 7. c. 33 | Burgh Police (Scotland) Act 1903 | Sections sixty-seven and sixty-eight. |
| 20 & 21 Geo. 5. c. 40 | Housing (Scotland) Act 1930 | In section seven, in subsection (1), paragraph (iv), and subsection (3). |

== Subsequent developments ==
Sections 76, 83 and 173, In section 184(1), all the definitions except those of "development corporation", "Highlands and Islands", "house", "housing association" and "land"; and section 184(3), sections 186(2) and 187 of, and schedules 9 and 13, to the act were repealed by section 1(1) of, and part X of schedule 1 to, the Statute Law (Repeals) Act 1981, which came into force on 21 May 1981.

The whole act was repealed by section 339 of, and schedule 24 to, the Housing (Scotland) Act 1987 (c. 26), which came into force on 15 August 1987.
