= Housing (Scotland) Act 1987 =

Act of the Parliament of the United Kingdom

Housing (Scotland) Act 1987 (Note: Section 340(1).)
- Act of Parliament
- Parliament of the United Kingdom
- Long title: An Act to consolidate with amendments to give effect to recommendations of the Scottish Law Commission, certain enactments relating to housing in Scotland.
- Citation: 1987 c. 26
- Territorial extent: Scotland (Note: Section 340(3).)

Dates
- Royal assent: 15 May 1987
- Commencement: 15 August 1987 (Note: Section 340(2).)
Other legislation
Amends	Airports Act 1986; See § Repealed enactments
Repeals/revokes	See § Repealed enactments
Amended by	Agricultural Holdings (Scotland) Act 1991; Clean Air Act 1993; Employment Tribunals Act 1996; Employment Rights Act 1996; Planning (Consequential Provisions) (Scotland) Act 1997; Crime and Disorder Act 1998; Abolition of Feudal Tenure etc. (Scotland) Act 2000; Postal Services Act 2011; Co-operative and Community Benefit Societies Act 2014

Status: Amended

Text of statute as originally enacted

Revised text of statute as amended

Text of the Housing (Scotland) Act 1987 as in force today (including any amendments) within the United Kingdom, from legislation.gov.uk.

The Housing (Scotland) Act 1987 (c. 26) is an act of the Parliament of the United Kingdom that consolidated enactments relating to housing in Scotland.

== Provisions ==
=== Repealed enactments ===
Section 339(3) of the act repealed 43 enactments, listed in schedule 24 to the act.

Citation	Short title	Extent of repeal
4 & 5 Geo. 5. c. 31	Housing Act 1914	The whole act.
14 Geo. 6. c. 34	Housing (Scotland) Act 1950	The whole act.
2 & 3 Eliz. 2. c. 50	Housing (Repairs and Rents) (Scotland) Act 1954	The whole act.
7 & 8 Eliz. 2. c. 33	House Purchase and Housing Act 1959	The whole act.
10 & 11 Eliz. 2. c. 28	Housing (Scotland) Act 1962	The whole act.
1964 c. 56	Housing Act 1964	Section 101.
1966 c. 49	Housing (Scotland) Act 1966	The whole act.
1967 c. 20	Housing (Financial Provisions, Etc.) (Scotland) Act 1967	The whole act.
1968 c. 16	New Towns (Scotland) Act 1968	Section 6(6).
1968 c. 31	Housing (Financial Provisions) (Scotland) Act 1968	The whole act, except sections 20, 67 and 71.
1969 c. 34	Housing (Scotland) Act 1969	The whole act.
1970 c. 44	Chronically Sick and Disabled Persons Act 1970	Section 3(1), (2).
1971 c. 76	Housing Act 1971	The whole act.
1972 c. 46	Housing (Financial Provisions) (Scotland) Act 1972	The whole act, except sections 69, 78 and 81 and in Schedule 9, paragraph 31.
1973 c. 5	Housing (Amendment) Act 1973	The whole act.
1973 c. 65	Local Government (Scotland) Act 1973	Section 131(2), in Schedule 9, paragraph 73, in Schedule 12 paragraphs 1, 2, 5, 6 to 19 and 21 to 24.
1974 c. 44	Housing Act 1974	The whole act, except sections 11, 18(2)–(6), 129, 130 and 131, Schedule 3 Part III, and Schedule 13 paragraphs 42 to 46.
1974 c. 45	Housing (Scotland) Act 1974	The whole act.
1975 c. 21	Criminal Procedure (Scotland) Act 1975	In Schedules 7C and 7D, the entries relating to the Housing (Scotland) Act 1966.
1975 c. 28	Housing Rents and Subsidies (Scotland) Act 1975	The whole act, except paragraphs 9 and 10 of Schedule 3.
1975 c. 30	Local Government (Scotland) Act 1975	In Schedule 3, paragraph 27; in paragraph 31 in the definition of "security" the words from "a local bond" to "enactment or".
1977 c. 48	Housing (Homeless Persons) Act 1977	The whole act.
1978 c. 14	Housing (Financial Provisions) (Scotland) Act 1978	The whole act, except paragraphs 12 to 14 and 39 of Schedule 2.
1978 c. 27	Home Purchase Assistance and Housing Corporation Guarantee Act 1978	The whole act.
1978 c. 48	Homes Insulation Act 1978	The whole act.
1979 c. 33	Land Registration (Scotland) Act 1979	In Schedule 2, paragraphs 5 and 6.
1980 c. 51	Housing Act 1980	The whole act.
1980 c. 52	Tenants' Rights, Etc. (Scotland) Act 1980	Parts I to III and Part V except section 74; Part VI except section 86; Schedules A1 and 1 to 4.
1980 c. 61	Tenants' Rights, Etc. (Scotland) Amendment Act 1980	The whole act.
1981 c. 23	Local Government (Miscellaneous Provisions) (Scotland) Act 1981	Sections 21 to 23, 34 and 35; in Schedule 2, paragraphs 11, 15, 35 and 36; in Schedule 3, paragraphs 8, 9, 10, 29 to 31 and 40 to 46.
1981 c. 72	Housing (Amendment) (Scotland) Act 1981	The whole act.
1982 c. 43	Local Government and Planning (Scotland) Act 1982	Sections 51 to 55; in Schedule 3 paragraphs 29 to 33 and 39 to 40.
1982 c. 45	Civic Government (Scotland) Act 1982	In Schedule 3, paragraph 4.
1984 c. 12	Telecommunications Act 1984	In Schedule 4, paragraph 45.
1984 c. 18	Tenants' Rights, Etc. (Scotland) Amendment Act 1984	The whole act.
1984 c. 31	Rating and Valuation Amendment (Scotland) Act 1984	Section 8.
1984 c. 50	Housing Defects Act 1984	The whole act.
1984 c. 58	Rent (Scotland) Act 1984	In section 5(2)(b) and in section 63(4)(g), the words "or any authorised society within the meaning of the Housing Act 1914"; in section 59, the words from "except that" to the end.
1985 c. 68	Housing Act 1985	In section 187, in the definition of "long tenancy", paragraph (b).
1985 c. 71	Housing (Consequential Provisions) Act 1985	In Schedule 2, paragraphs 10, 16, 17, 37, 39, 40, 42 and 45.
1986 c. 65	Housing (Scotland) Act 1986	Sections 1 to 12 and 18 and 21, Schedule 1, Schedule 2, paragraph 2.
1986 c. 63	Housing and Planning Act 1986	Section 3; in Schedule 5, paragraphs 14 and 17.
1986 c. 53	Building Societies Act 1986	In Schedule 18, paragraph 12.
