= Rent assessment committee =

A rent assessment committee is a tribunal in England and Wales set up under the Rent Acts whose main task is to assess fair and market rents of properties referred to it. There is a statutory right of appeal to the High Court of England and Wales and thence to the Court of Appeal.

On the formation of the Residential Property Tribunal Service as a result of the Housing Act 2004 the rent assessment committees became part of that body for administrative purposes, and is therefore now called the First-tier Tribunal (Property Chamber - Residential Property).

== Jurisdiction ==
The First Tier Tribunal (Property Chamber - Residential Property) has the following jurisdictions:

- cancellation of a registered rent (s. 81A Rent Act 1977)
- determination of the terms of a statutory periodic assured tenancy (s. 6 Housing Act 1988)
- determination of a market rent for an assured tenancy (s. 22 Housing Act 1988)
- questions concerning purchase notices
- questions concerning acquisition orders

== Membership ==
The First Tier Tribunal (Property Chamber - Residential Property) normally consists of two or three persons from the local Rent Assessment Panel selected by the president (or in their absence a vice-president) of the Panel. At least one member, who will chair the First Tier Tribunal (Property Chamber - Residential Property), must be a president or vice-president of the panel or a lawyer appointed by the Lord Chancellor.

The president or vice-president of a panel may direct that certain cases, or classes of cases, may be heard by a single chairman sitting alone and any application to cancel a registered rent because the property is no longer subject to a restricted contract will be heard by a single chairman.

== Appeals ==
An appeal may be made, usually on a point of law only, to the High Court of England and Wales. The First Tier Tribunal (Property Chamber - Residential Property) may also be required to sign and state a case for the opinion of the High Court. There is an approved procedure for such an appeal. Appeals on points of law are made to the Administrative Court of the High Court using a Part 8 Claim Form with the appropriate fee. Appeals may also be made on procedural irregularities by way of judicial review. A further appeal may then be made to the Court of Appeal of England and Wales.

== Procedure ==
Rent Assessment Committees (England and Wales) Regulations 1971
- Statutory Instrument
- Parliament of the United Kingdom
- Citation: SI 1971/1065

Dates
- Made: 29 June 1971
- Laid before Parliament: 7 July 1971
- Commencement: 2 August 1971

Other legislation
- Made under: Rent Act 1968; Housing Act 1969; Rent (Control of Increases) Act 1969

Status: Amended

Text of the Rent Assessment Committees (England and Wales) Regulations 1971 as in force today (including any amendments) within the United Kingdom, from legislation.gov.uk.

Procedure is informal and there are few procedural rules. The procedure is governed by the Rent Assessment Committees (England and Wales) Regulations 1971 (SI 1971/1065), which has been amended a number of times since.

The first stage will be for the First Tier Tribunal (Property Chamber – Residential Property), to establish whether it has jurisdiction in the matter. This will often be done by administrative staff. In cases where the administrative staff do not believe that they have jurisdiction they will refer the matter to the RAC to determine this point. The First Tier Tribunal (Property Chamber - Residential Property) will accept representations either on paper or in person.

Assuming that the committee accepts that it has the necessary jurisdiction to make a decision it will set down the matter for a hearing. Any of the involved parties can ask that the RAC hears evidence at the hearing to support their case although they are required to do so at least 28 days before the hearing date itself.

In cases where the First Tier Tribunal (Property Chamber - Residential Property) is being asked to decide on a market rent, and in other cases where it seems appropriate, the committee members will seek to visit the property in question. They will usually do this on the morning of the day scheduled for the hearing.

== In Wales ==
Rent assessment committees still exist in Wales, as part of the Residential Property Tribunal Wales. It consists of two or three tribunal members, and operates under the provisions of the Rent Act 1977, hearing appeals from a landlord or tenant on the decisions of the local council rent officer on whether the rent charged is fair.
