= Increase of Rent and Mortgage Interest (War Restrictions) Act 1915 =

Act of the Parliament of the United Kingdom

- Act of Parliament
- Parliament of the United Kingdom
- Long title: An Act to restrict, in connection with the present War, the Increase of the Rent of Small Dwelling-houses and the Increase of the Rate of Interest on, and the Calling in of, Securities on such Dwelling-houses.
- Citation: 5 & 6 Geo. 5. c. 97
- Territorial extent: United Kingdom

Dates
- Royal assent: 23 December 1915
- Commencement: 4 August 1914 (Note: Start of the war.)
- Repealed: 2 July 1920
Other legislation
Repealed by	Increase of Rent and Mortgage Interest (Restrictions) Act 1920

Status: Repealed

The Increase of Rent and Mortgage Interest (War Restrictions) Act 1915 (5 & 6 Geo. 5. c. 97), also known as the Rent Restrictions Act, was an act of the Parliament of the United Kingdom which restricted increases in rent and the rate of mortgage interest during World War I. The act was in place on 25 November 1915 with its restrictions retrospectively in place from 4 August 1914.

The act was, in part, a result of a rent strike which had taken place in Glasgow between 1914–15 as landlords sought to capitalise on the large influx of people into Glasgow that the promise of war and munitions work had brought into Glasgow. At its peak the rent strike involved as many as 20,000 people with its influence extending to other working-class communities in the UK. The crisis of the rent strike was brought to a head when Mr Nicholson, a factor in the Partick area of the city, sought the prosecution of eighteen strikers in the small debt court. On 17 November 1915, thousands of shipyard workers came out on strike and alongside what had become known as "Mrs Barbour's Army" descended on the court in Brunswick Place, Glasgow. Despite the possibility of further industrial unrest disrupting the supply of war munitions, the factor insisted on pursuing the case. Only when it was revealed that David Lloyd George had telephoned Nicholson's solicitor urging the legal action to wait on the findings of a parliamentary commission of inquiry was the prosecution dropped. Within a month of the court case the Rent Restrictions Act was in place, and was designed to stop landlords from profiteering during the war years when housing demand was high and supply was low.

The act was divided into five sections:

1. Restrictions on raising rent or rate of mortgage interest
2. Interpretation and application
3. Rules as to procedure
4. Application to Scotland and Ireland
5. Short title and duration

The act was initially intended as a temporary measure lasting during the continuance of the war and for a period of until six months after the end of the war. although certain sections were not actually repealed until 1989 when rents were deregulated during the third term of Margaret Thatcher's Conservative government.

== Subsequent developments ==
The whole act was repealed by section 19(3) of, and the second schedule to, the Increase of Rent and Mortgage Interest (Restrictions) Act 1920 (10 & 11 Geo. 5. c. 17), which came into force on 2 July 1920.
