= Rent Act 1968 =

Act of the Parliament of the United Kingdom

Rent Act 1968 (Note: Section 118(1).)
- Act of Parliament
- Parliament of the United Kingdom
- Long title: An Act to consolidate the Rent and Mortgage Interest Restrictions Acts 1920 to 1939, the Furnished Houses (Rent Control) Act 1946, the Landlord and Tenant (Rent Control) Act 1949, Part II of the Housing Repairs and Rents Act 1954, the Rent Act 1957 (except section 16 thereof), the Rent Act 1965 (except Part III thereof) and other related enactments.
- Citation: 1968 c. 23
- Territorial extent: England and Wales (Note: Section 118(3).)

Dates
- Royal assent: 8 May 1968
- Commencement: 8 June 1968 (Note: Section 118(2).)
- Repealed: 29 August 1977
Other legislation
Amends	See § Repealed enactments
Repeals/revokes	See § Repealed enactments
Amended by	Fire Precautions Act 1971; Tribunals and Inquiries Act 1971; Housing Finance Act 1972; Rent Act 1974; Agricultural Holdings (Notices to Quit) Act 1977; Protection from Eviction Act 1977
Repealed by	Rent Act 1977
Relates to	Rent (Scotland) Act 1971

Status: Repealed

Text of statute as originally enacted

The Rent Act 1968 (c. 23) was an act of the Parliament of the United Kingdom that consolidated enactments relating to rent control in England and Wales.

The Rent (Scotland) Act 1971 made similar provisions for Scotland.

== Provisions ==
=== Repealed enactments ===
Section 117(5) of the act repealed 32 enactments, listed in schedule 17 to the act.

Enactments repealed by section 117(5)
Citation	Short title	Extent of repeal
10 & 11 Geo. 5. c. 17	Increase of Rent and Mortgage Interest (Restrictions) Act 1920	The whole act.
13 & 14 Geo. 5. c. 32	Rent and Mortgage Interest Restrictions Act 1923	The whole act.
14 & 15 Geo. 5. c. 18	Prevention of Eviction Act 1924	The whole act.
15 & 16 Geo. 5. c. 32	Rent and Mortgage Interest (Restrictions Continuation) Act 1925	The whole act.
23 & 24 Geo. 5. c. 32	Rent and Mortgage Interest Restrictions (Amendment) Act 1933	The whole act.
25 & 26 Geo. 5. c. 13	Increase of Rent and Mortgage Interest (Restrictions) Act 1935	The whole act.
1 & 2 Geo. 6. c. 26	Increase of Rent and Mortgage Interest (Restrictions) Act 1938	The whole act.
2 & 3 Geo. 6. c. 71	Rent and Mortgage Interest Restrictions Act 1939	The whole act.
9 & 10 Geo. 6. c. 34	Furnished Houses (Rent Control) Act 1946	The whole act.
11 & 12 Geo. 6. c. 63	Agricultural Holdings Act 1948	In Schedule 7, paragraph 1.
12 & 13 Geo. 6. c. 40	Landlord and Tenant (Rent Control) Act 1949	The whole act.
14 & 15 Geo. 6. c. 65	Reserve and Auxiliary Forces (Protection of Civil Interests) Act 1951	In section 19, subsections (4) and (6). In section 64(1), the definition beginning "Rent Restrictions Acts".
15 & 16 Geo. 6 & 1 Eliz. 2. c. 40	Crown Lessees (Protection of Sub-Tenants) Act 1952	The whole act.
1 & 2 Eliz. 2. c. 47	Emergency Laws (Miscellaneous Provisions) Act 1953	In Schedule 1, paragraph 4
2 & 3 Eliz. 2. c. 53	Housing Repairs and Rents Act 1954	Part II. Schedule 4.
2 & 3 Eliz. 2. c. 56	Landlord and Tenant Act 1954	Section 15.
3 & 4 Eliz. 2. c. 24	Requisitioned Houses and Housing (Amendment) Act 1955	In section 4, subsection (4). Section 5. In section 18(1), the definition beginning "the Rent Acts" and the definition of "statutory successor".
5 & 6 Eliz. 2. c. 25	Rent Act 1957	Sections 1 to 15. Sections 17 to 26. In section 27, subsections (2) to (4). Schedules 1 to 8.
5 & 6 Eliz. 2. c. 56	Housing Act 1957	Section 84. In section 189(1) the definition of "the Rent Acts". In Schedule 10, the entries relating to the Housing Repairs and Rents Act 1954 and the Rent Act 1957.
6 & 7 Eliz. 2. c. 42	Housing (Financial Provisions) Act 1958	Section 40.
7 & 8 Eliz. 2. c. 22	County Courts Act 1959	In section 109, in subsection (4), the words from "or if possession" to the end of the subsection.
7 & 8 Eliz. 2. c. 33	House Purchase and Housing Act 1959	Section 27.
7 & 8 Eliz. 2. c. 62	New Towns Act 1959	In section 4, in subsection (5), the words from the beginning to "and accordingly", and subsection (6).
7 & 8 Eliz. 2. c. 64	Landlord and Tenant (Furniture and Fittings) Act 1959	The whole act.
8 & 9 Eliz. 2. c. 58	Charities Act 1960	In Schedule 6, the entry relating to the Housing Repairs and Rents Act 1954.
9 & 10 Eliz. 2. c. 65	Housing Act 1961	Section 29.
1963 c. 33	London Government Act 1963	In Schedule 17, paragraphs 16 and 19.
1964 c. 56	Housing Act 1964	Section 3(9). Section 35.
1964 c. 97	Protection from Eviction Act 1964	Section 5.
1965 c. 75	Rent Act 1965	Parts I, II and IV. Sections 43 and 46. In section 47, subsection (1), except the definitions of "agricultural holding" and "the Minister", and subsection (2). Section 50. In section 52, subsection (2). In section 53, subsections (2) and (3). Schedules 1 to 5. Schedule 6, except paragraphs 1, 2 and 10. In Schedule 7, Part I and the entry in Part II relating to the Increase of Rent and Mortgage Interest (Restrictions) Act 1920.
1967 c. 22	Agriculture Act 1967	Section 38.
1967 c. 88	Leasehold Reform Act 1967	In section 37(1), paragraph (c). In section 39(1), paragraphs (a), (b)(i) and (c). In Schedule 5, paragraph 9.

== Subsequent developments ==
The whole act was repealed by section 155(5) of, and schedule 25 to, the Rent Act 1977, which came into force on 29 August 1977.
