= Housing (Scotland) Act 1966 =

Act of the Parliament of the United Kingdom

Housing (Scotland) Act 1966 (Note: Section 213(1).)
- Act of Parliament
- Parliament of the United Kingdom
- Long title: An Act to consolidate certain enactments relating to housing in Scotland, with the exception of certain provisions relating to financial matters.
- Citation: 1966 c. 49
- Territorial extent: Scotland (Note: Section 213(3).)

Dates
- Royal assent: 21 December 1966
- Commencement: 1 April 1967 (Note: Section 213(2).)
- Repealed: 15 August 1987
Other legislation
Amends	See § Repealed enactments
Repeals/revokes	See § Repealed enactments
Amended by	Rent (Scotland) Act 1971; Statute Law (Repeals) Act 1974; Statute Law (Repeals) Act 1981
Repealed by	Housing (Scotland) Act 1987

Status: Repealed

Text of statute as originally enacted

The Housing (Scotland) Act 1966 (c. 49) was an act of the Parliament of the United Kingdom that consolidated certain enactments relating to housing in Scotland, with the exception of certain provisions relating to financial matters.

== Provisions ==
=== Repealed enactments ===
Section 212 of the act repealed 13 enactments, listed in parts I and II of the tenth schedule to the act.

Part I – Enactments repealed as from the commencement of this Act
Citation	Short title	Extent of repeal
14 Geo. 6. c. 34	Housing (Scotland) Act 1950	Sections 2 to 4. Sections 6 to 22. Sections 24 to 73. In section 74, the words "may in giving consent impose such conditions, and". Sections 79 to 82. In section 83, the words from "and accordingly" to the end of the section. In section 121, subsections (1) and (2). Section 131. In section 132, the words "V and" and the words "and section one hundred and thirty-one". Sections 133 and 134. Section 136. Sections 143 and 144. Sections 146 to 166. Sections 169 to 172. Section 177. Section 181. Section 185. In section 186, subsections (3) and (5). In section 187(1), the words from "and in the case" to "Part IV of this Act". Schedules 1 to 3. In Schedule 4, paragraphs 1, 2, 4, 5 and 6. Schedule 5. Schedules 11 and 12. In Schedule 13, Part II.
15 & 16 Geo. 6 & 1 Eliz. 2. c. 63	Housing (Scotland) Act 1952	In section 2, subsection (2). Section 8. In section 9, subsection (5).
2 & 3 Eliz. 2. c. 50	Housing (Repairs and Rents) (Scotland) Act 1954	Sections 1 to 3. Sections 6 to 8. In section 11, subsections (2) and (3). Section 13. In section 14, subsection (3). In section 15, subsection (2) and, in subsection (3), paragraph (5). In section 41(1), the words "subsection (1) of section seven". In section 44(3), the words "subsection (6) of section six of this Act, and to".
2 & 3 Eliz. 2. c. 73	Town and Country Planning (Scotland) Act 1954	Section 39.
5 & 6 Eliz. 2. c. 25	Rent Act 1957	In section 11, subsection (6).
5 & 6 Eliz. 2. c. 38	Housing and Town Development (Scotland) Act 1957	Section 20. Section 22. In Schedule 1, paragraphs 1 and 7.
7 & 8 Eliz. 2. c. 70	Town and Country Planning (Scotland) Act 1959	In section 27, paragraph (a) of subsection (5).
9 & 10 Eliz. 2. c. 65	Housing Act 1961	Sections 12 to 19. Sections 21 to 23. Section 28.
10 & 11 Eliz. 2. c. 28	Housing (Scotland) Act 1962	In section 14, subsection (1). Sections 21 to 31. Section 33. In section 34, subsections (2) and (3). In section 35(1), the words "in the case of those in Part II, modifications relating to houses unfit for human habitation". In Schedule 4, paragraphs 1, 9 to 25, 27 to 30 and 35.
1964 c. 56	Housing Act 1964	Sections 13 to 19. Sections 22 to 28. Section 31. Sections 33 and 34. Section 36. Sections 38 to 44. Sections 58 and 59. Sections 64 to 84. Sections 86 to 91. In section 99, subsections (1) to (3) and subsections (5) and (6). Section 102. Section 103, except subsection (1). In section 107, paragraphs (d), (e) and (f). Schedules 3 and 4. In Schedule 5, the amendment of the Housing (Scotland) Act 1950.
1965 c. 67	Hire-Purchase (Scotland) Act 1965	In Schedule 5, the amendment of the Housing (Scotland) Act 1950.

Part II – Enactments repealed as from the appointed day
Citation	Short title	Extent of repeal
3 Edw. 7. c. 33	Burgh Police (Scotland) Act 1903	Sections 67 and 68.
20 & 21 Geo. 5. c. 40	Housing (Scotland) Act 1930	In section 7, in subsection (1), paragraph (iv), and subsection (3).

== Subsequent developments ==
Section 209 of the act was repealed by section 1(1) of, and part VI of schedule 1 to, the Statute Law (Repeals) Act 1981, which came into force on 21 May 1981.

The whole act was repealed by section 339(3) of, and schedule 24 to, the Housing (Scotland) Act 1987, which came into force on 15 August 1987.
