= Housing and Planning Act 1986 =

Act of the Parliament of the United Kingdom

Housing and Planning Act 1986 (Note: Section 59.)
- Act of Parliament
- Parliament of the United Kingdom
- Long title: An Act to make further provision with respect to housing, planning and local inquiries; to provide financial assistance for the regeneration of urban areas; and for connected purposes.
- Citation: 1986 c. 63
- Territorial extent: England and Wales; Scotland; Northern Ireland; (Note: Section 58.)

Dates
- Royal assent: 7 November 1986
- Commencement: various (Note: Section 57.)
Other legislation
Amends	Rent Act 1977; National Heritage Act 1983; Landlord and Tenant Act 1985
Amended by	Housing (Scotland) Act 1987; Planning (Consequential Provisions) Act 1990; Water Consolidation (Consequential Provisions) Act 1991; Radioactive Substances Act 1993; Planning (Consequential Provisions) (Scotland) Act 1997; Statute Law (Repeals) Act 2008

Status: Amended

Text of statute as originally enacted

Revised text of statute as amended

Text of the Housing and Planning Act 1986 as in force today (including any amendments) within the United Kingdom, from legislation.gov.uk.

The Housing and Planning Act 1986 (c. 63) is an act of the Parliament of the United Kingdom. It gave councils the option of transferring their housing stock to another landlord, such as a registered social landlord (RSL).
