= Housing Act 1969 =

Act of the Parliament of the United Kingdom

Housing Act 1969 (Note: Section 91(1).)
- Act of Parliament
- Parliament of the United Kingdom
- Long title: An Act to make further provision for grants by local authorities and contributions out of moneys provided by Parliament towards the cost of providing dwellings by conversion or of improving dwellings and houses; to confer powers on local authorities to improve living conditions by improving the amenities of areas or of dwellings therein; to amend the law with regard to rents payable for certain dwellings in good repair and provided with certain amenities or improved with the assistance of local authorities; to make further provision with regard to houses in multiple occupation; to make further provision for payments in respect of unfit houses subject to compulsory purchase, clearance, demolition or closing orders; to alter the legal standard of fitness for human habitation and confer additional powers on local authorities to require the repair of houses.
- Citation: 1969 c. 33
- Territorial extent: England and Wales (Note: Section 91(5)–(6).)

Dates
- Royal assent: 25 July 1969
- Commencement: 25 September 1969 (Note: Section 91(4).)

Other legislation
- Amends: Housing Act 1957
- Amended by: Town and Country Planning Act 1971; Housing Act 1974; Rent Act 1977; Statute Law (Repeals) Act 1981; Acquisition of Land Act 1981; Housing (Consequential Provisions) Act 1985

Status: Amended

Text of statute as originally enacted

Revised text of statute as amended

Text of the Housing Act 1969 as in force today (including any amendments) within the United Kingdom, from legislation.gov.uk.

The Housing Act 1969 (c. 33) is an act of the Parliament of the United Kingdom that provided grants to home owners and landlords to improve the quality of their housing and to help finance local authorities to improve the quality of housing stock under their control.

== Background ==
The act gained royal assent in July 1969 and commencing on 25 August 1969. The legislation established the concept of General Improvement Areas which could be declared in regions of derelict or run-down housing to allow for regeneration as opposed to demolition and slum clearance. The act raised the maximum amount available from improvement grants, from £500 (equivalent to £7,265 in 2025) to £1200 (equivalent to £17,436 in 2025) for each property conversion of three or more storeys, or 20% less for any other types of improvement, although the amount was flexible at the discretion of local authorities. A previous condition that restricted owners from selling homes improved with grant funding was removed under the act, with no evidence suggesting that this had created any problems when reported in May 1970. Other previous restrictions, such as a proportion of a grant needing to be repaid if a house was sold for owner-occupation within three years was also removed in the act.

The act made it difficult for local authorities to delay undertaking renewal actions and placed a duty upon them to review the conditions of housing in their districts, with grants available for aesthetic improvements such as to encourage tree planting. In reaction to the act, councils in cities including London, Glasgow and Leeds started to prepare proposals for regenerating run-down housing. Of particular note was Liverpool City Council's response to the act, which invited the housing charity Shelter to rehabilitate run-down housing in the Granby ward of Toxteth. At this time, just 17% of houses in the area where owner-occupied and many where privately owned and rented, often with multiple occupation.

Under part III of the act, landlords were able to obtain a qualification certificate from the local authority for the purposes of obtaining a "fair rent" on properties improved sufficiently enough that they were fit for habitation and in good repair for their age. The act superseded the Housing Subsidies Act 1967, which provided housing associations a contribution towards the cost of acquiring homes to be improved.

== Operation ==
Pamphlets advising people how to modernise their home were distributed in the months following the act becoming legal, totaling 300,000 copies by November 1969. During the first three months of the act's operation, the value of grants paid for improvement and conversion to owners, associations and landlords was £3.4M (equivalent to £49,402,078 in 2025), although this figure included grants approved under previous legislation. From September 1969 to February 1970, there was a 5,515 increase in grants approved in England and Wales compared to the same period 12 months prior, with an increase of 5,866 grants to private owners, although there were also 351 fewer grants to authorities.

By March 1970, 28 authorities had declared general improvement areas that involved 31 different schemes, which had increased to 40 authorities declaring 49 improvement areas by May 1970. Around a year later in February 1971, 115 improvement areas had been declared in England and Wales by 87 local authorities.

== Bibliography ==
- Towers, Graham (2003). Building Democracy. Routledge. ISBN 9781135370749.
