= Rent Act 1977 =

Act of the Parliament of the United Kingdom

Rent Act 1977 (Note: Section 156(1).)
- Act of Parliament
- Parliament of the United Kingdom
- Long title: An Act to consolidate the Rent Act 1968, Parts III, IV and VIII of the Housing Finance Act 1972, the Rent Act 1974, sections 7 to 10 of the Housing Rents and Subsidies Act 1975, and certain related enactments, with amendments to give effect to recommendations of the Law Commission.
- Citation: 1977 c. 42
- Territorial extent: England and Wales (Note: Section 156(3).)

Dates
- Royal assent: 29 July 1977
- Commencement: 29 August 1977 (Note: Section 156(2).)

Other legislation
- Amends: Pensions (Increase) Act 1971; Housing Finance Act 1972; Rent Act 1974; Housing Rents and Subsidies Act 1975; See § Repealed enactments
- Repeals/revokes: See § Repealed enactments
- Amended by: Interpretation Act 1978; Statute Law (Repeals) Act 1978; Housing Act 1980; Local Government, Planning and Land Act 1980; Regulated Tenancies (Procedure) Regulations 1980; Matrimonial Homes and Property Act 1981; Acquisition of Land Act 1981; New Towns Act 1981; Rent Assessment Committees (England and Wales) (Amendment) Regulations 1981; Social Security and Housing Benefits Act 1982; Criminal Justice Act 1982; Matrimonial Homes Act 1983; County Courts Act 1984; Rent (Amendment) Act 1985; Local Government Act 1985; Housing (Consequential Provisions) Act 1985; Housing and Planning Act 1986; Rent (Relief from Phasing) Order 1987; Norfolk and Suffolk Broads Act 1988; Education Reform Act 1988; Housing Act 1988; References to Rating (Housing) Regulations 1990; Social Security (Consequential Provisions) Act 1992; Leasehold Reform, Housing and Urban Development Act 1993; Pension Schemes Act 1993; Local Government Finance (Housing) (Consequential Amendments) Order 1993; Local Government (Wales) Act 1994; Agricultural Tenancies Act 1995; Environment Act 1995; Local Government Changes (Rent Act) Regulations 1995; Trusts of Land and Appointment of Trustees Act 1996; Housing Act 1996 (Consequential Provisions) Order 1996; Government of Wales Act 1998; Administration of the Rent Officer Service (England) Order 1999; Government of Wales Act 1998 (Housing) (Amendments) Order 1999; Criminal Justice and Police Act 2001; Land Registration Act 2002; Licensing Act 2003; Civil Partnership Act 2004; Regulatory Reform (Fire Safety) Order 2005; Regulatory Reform (Fire Safety) Subordinate Provisions Order 2006; Tribunals, Courts and Enforcement Act 2007; Local Government and Public Involvement in Health Act 2007; Housing and Regeneration Act 2008; Transfer of Functions (Administration of Rent Officer Service in England) Order 2008; Local Democracy, Economic Development and Construction Act 2009; Housing and Regeneration Act 2008 (Consequential Provisions) Order 2010; Police Reform and Social Responsibility Act 2011; Localism Act 2011; Charities (Pre-consolidation Amendments) Order 2011; Crime and Courts Act 2013; Transfer of Tribunal Functions Order 2013; Universal Credit (Consequential, Supplementary, Incidental and Miscellaneous Provisions) Regulations 2013; Marriage (Same Sex Couples) Act 2013 (Consequential and Contrary Provisions and Scotland) Order 2014; Deregulation Act 2015; Policing and Crime Act 2017; Wales Act 2017; Civil Partnership (Opposite-sex Couples) Regulations 2019; Immigration and Social Security Co-ordination (EU Withdrawal) Act 2020 (Consequential, Saving, Transitional and Transitory Provisions) (EU Exit) Regulations 2020; Renting Homes (Wales) Act 2016 (Saving and Transitional Provisions) Regulations 2022; Levelling-up and Regeneration Act 2023; Renting Homes (Wales) Act 2016 (Consequential Amendments) Regulations 2023; Renters' Rights Act 2025; Legislation (Procedure, Publication and Repeals) (Wales) Act 2025
- Relates to: Protection from Eviction Act 1977

Status: Amended

Text of statute as originally enacted

Revised text of statute as amended

Text of the Rent Act 1977 as in force today (including any amendments) within the United Kingdom, from legislation.gov.uk.

The Rent Act 1977 (c. 42) is an act of the Parliament of the United Kingdom. The act introduced the protected tenancy in England and Wales.

The organization setting the rent, the Valuation Office Agency, was known as the "Rent Office".

== Provisions ==
=== Repealed enactments ===
Section 155(5) of the act repealed 23 enactments, listed in schedule 25 to the act.

Enactments repealed by section 155(5)
| Citation | Short title | Extent of repeal |
|---|---|---|
| 2 & 3 Eliz. 2. c. 56 | Landlord and Tenant Act 1954 | In section 22(1), from " Act of 1920" to "Acts, 1920 to 1938 ". |
| 7 & 8 Eliz. 2. c. 33 | House Purchase and Housing Act 1959 | In section 29(1), the definition of " controlled tenancy ". |
| 1968 c. 23 | Rent Act 1968 | The whole act. |
| 1969 c. 33 | Housing Act 1969 | In section 40(2)(a) the words " Part III ". |
| 1969 c. 33 | Housing Act 1969 | Section 80. |
| 1969 c. 33 | Housing Act 1969 | Section 81. |
| 1969 c. 33 | Housing Act 1969 | Section 83. |
| 1969 c. 33 | Housing Act 1969 | Schedule 7. |
| 1969 c. 33 | Housing Act 1969 | In Schedule 8, paragraphs 32 and 33. |
| 1969 c. 33 | Housing Act 1969 | In Schedule 9, paragraphs 3 to 5. |
| 1969 c. 62 | Rent (Control of Increases) Act 1969 | Section 5. |
| 1969 c. 62 | Rent (Control of Increases) Act 1969 | Section 6. |
| 1970 c. 31 | Administration of Justice Act 1970 | Section 47. |
| 1970 c. 40 | Agriculture Act 1970 | Section 100. |
| 1971 c. 40 | Fire Precautions Act 1971 | In the Schedule, Part I. |
| 1971 c. 62 | Tribunals and Inquiries Act 1971 | In Schedule 3, the entry relating to the Rent Act 1968. |
| 1972 c. 11 | Superannuation Act 1972 | In Schedule 6, paragraph 71. |
| 1972 c. 47 | Housing Finance Act 1972 | Sections 27 to 34. |
| 1972 c. 47 | Housing Finance Act 1972 | Sections 37 to 39. |
| 1972 c. 47 | Housing Finance Act 1972 | Sections 41 to 48. |
| 1972 c. 47 | Housing Finance Act 1972 | Sections 81 to 88. |
| 1972 c. 47 | Housing Finance Act 1972 | In section 103, in subsection (3), paragraphs (a) and (b) and in paragraph (d) the words from " section 7" to " cost of repairs)". |
| 1972 c. 47 | Housing Finance Act 1972 | Schedule 5. |
| 1972 c. 47 | Housing Finance Act 1972 | Schedule 6. |
| 1972 c. 47 | Housing Finance Act 1972 | In Schedule 9, paragraphs 10 to 13, 16 and 17. |
| 1972 c. 47 | Housing Finance Act 1972 | In Schedule 10, paragraph 7. |
| 1972 c. 62 | Agriculture (Miscellaneous Provisions) Act 1972 | In section 24, from the beginning to " 1968 and " and the words " case 14 or as the case may be ". |
| 1972 c. 70 | Local Government Act 1972 | Section 205. |
| 1973 c. 9 | Counter-Inflation Act 1973 | Section 14. |
| 1973 c. 9 | Counter-Inflation Act 1973 | In Schedule 4, paragraph 11(2). |
| 1973 c. 9 | Counter-Inflation Act 1973 | Schedule 5. |
| 1973 c. 26 | Land Compensation Act 1973 | Section 20(11). |
| 1974 c. 44 | Housing Act 1974 | In section 18, in subsection (1), the words from " subsection (5) " to " or in " and from "or paragraph 23" to "1975", in subsection (2), the words from "Part VIII" to "applies, or", the words " the Rent Act 1968 or of" and the words "the Rent Act 1968 or". |
| 1974 c. 44 | Housing Act 1974 | In section 49(2), paragraph (c) and the word " or" immediately preceding it. |
| 1974 c. 44 | Housing Act 1974 | In Schedule 3, in paragraph 1(1)(b), the words from " section 5(5)" to "or of", in paragraph 1(3)(c) the words " the Rent Act 1968, or to ", in paragraph 3(1) the words "of the Rent Act 1968 or of", in paragraph 4(3) the words from "section 113" to " in Scotland ", and Part II. |
| 1974 c. 44 | Housing Act 1974 | In Schedule 13, paragraphs 16, 17, 25 to 29, 33, 34 and 37. |
| 1974 c. 44 | Housing Act 1974 | In Schedule 14, paragraph 4. |
| 1974 c. 44 | Housing Act 1974 | In Schedule 15, in the entry relating to the Rent Act 1968, the words " and Schedule 2 ". |
| 1974 c. 51 | Rent Act 1974 | Section 1(4)(c). |
| 1974 c. 51 | Rent Act 1974 | In section 2, in subsection (3), the words "paragraph 1 or, as the case may require,", and from the beginning of subsection (4) to " this Act and ". |
| 1974 c. 51 | Rent Act 1974 | In section 3, subsection (1) and from the beginning of subsection (3) to " 1968 and ". |
| 1974 c. 51 | Rent Act 1974 | Section 4(1) and (2). |
| 1974 c. 51 | Rent Act 1974 | In section 5, from the beginning of subsection (2) to " may require" and, in subsection (3), the words from " section 45(1)(b) " to " may require ". |
| 1974 c. 51 | Rent Act 1974 | Sections 6, 7 and 8. |
| 1974 c. 51 | Rent Act 1974 | In section 13, in subsection (1), the words from " subsection (2) " to " may require " and in subsection (2)(a) the words " 18(2) or, as the case may require,". |
| 1974 c. 51 | Rent Act 1974 | Section 14(1) and (2). |
| 1974 c. 51 | Rent Act 1974 | In section 15, in subsection (1), the words from " a Part VI" to " may require" (in the definition of furnished letting), the words from " in relation", where they first occur, to " to Scotland" (in the definition of the Rent Act) and the words from " Part VI " to " may require " (in the definition of the relevant Part of the Rent Act) and, in subsection (2), the words from " section 113(1) " to " may require ". |
| 1974 c. 51 | Rent Act 1974 | Section 17(2) and (4). |
| 1974 c. 51 | Rent Act 1974 | In Schedule 1, paragraph 4(2), in paragraph 5(1) the words from " Case 10 " to " case may be ", in paragraph 5(2) the words from " section 79 " to " case may be", and paragraphs 8 to 16. |
| 1974 c. 51 | Rent Act 1974 | In Schedule 2, paragraphs 1, 3 and 4. |
| 1975 c. 6 | Housing Rents and Subsidies Act 1975 | Sections 7 to 10. |
| 1975 c. 6 | Housing Rents and Subsidies Act 1975 | In section 16(1), the definitions of " contractual period", " notice of increase ", " registered", "regulated tenancy" and " statutory period ". |
| 1975 c. 6 | Housing Rents and Subsidies Act 1975 | Schedules 2 to 4. |
| 1975 c. 6 | Housing Rents and Subsidies Act 1975 | In Schedule 5, paragraphs 1 and 2. |
| 1975 c. 18 | Social Security (Consequential Provisions) Act 1975 | In Schedule 2, paragraph 34. |
| 1975 c. 60 | Social Security Pensions Act 1975 | In Schedule 4, paragraph 11. |
| 1975 c. 78 | Airports Authority Act 1975 | In Schedule 5, in Part II, paragraph 1. |
| 1976 c. 76 | Development of Rural Wales Act 1976 | In Schedule 7, paragraph 6. |
| 1976 c. 80 | Rent (Agriculture) Act 1976 | Section 40(4). |
| 1976 c. 80 | Rent (Agriculture) Act 1976 | In Schedule 8, paragraphs 19 to 26, 32 and 33. |

== See also ==
- Rent regulation
- English land law
