= List of acts of the Parliament of Northern Ireland, 1950–1959 =

This is a list of acts of the Parliament of Northern Ireland, from its first session in 1921 to suspension in 1972.

From 1922 onwards, the short titles for these acts were distinguished from those passed by the Westminster parliament by the insertion of the bracketed words "Northern Ireland" between the word "act" and the year. Thus the Police Act (Northern Ireland) 1970 was an act passed by the Parliament of Northern Ireland, whereas the Police (Northern Ireland) Act 1998 was passed at Westminster.

As with UK legislation, Northern Ireland's acts of Parliament were traditionally cited using the regnal year(s) of the parliamentary session in which they became law, though in 1954 this was retrospectively changed to calendar years beginning with 1943. Note that by convention "(N.I.)" is also added after the chapter number so as to avoid confusion with Westminster legislation.

== 1950 ==
=== Public acts ===
| Short title, or popular name | Citation | Royal assent |
Long title
| Education (Miscellaneous Provisions) Act (Northern Ireland) 1950 (repealed) | 1950 c. 1 (N.I.) | 14 February 1950 |
(Repealed by Education and Libraries (Northern Ireland) Order 1972 (SI 1972/1263)
| Sale of Ice-Cream (Amendment) Act (Northern Ireland) 1950 | 1950 c. 2 (N.I.) | 14 February 1950 |
| Exchequer and Financial Provisions Act (Northern Ireland) 1950 | 1950 c. 3 (N.I.) | 14 February 1950 |
An Act to amend the law with respect to the Exchequer and Consolidated Fund of Northern Ireland; to make further provision with regard to public accounts and the receipt, issue, borrowing, investment, and funding of public moneys; and for purposes connected therewith.
| Fire Services (Amendment) Act (Northern Ireland) 1950 | 1950 c. 4 (N.I.) | 14 February 1950 |
| Children and Young Persons Act (Northern Ireland) 1950 | 1950 c. 5 (N.I.) | 14 February 1950 |
An Act to repeal and re-enact with amendments certain enactments relating to children and young persons, to make further and better provision with respect to children and young persons, and for purposes connected with the matters aforesaid.
| Adoption of Children Act (Northern Ireland) 1950 | 1950 c. 6 (N.I.) | 14 February 1950 |
| Probation Act (Northern Ireland) 1950 | 1950 c. 7 (N.I.) | 14 February 1950 |
| Consolidated Fund Act (Northern Ireland) 1950 | 1950 c. 8 (N.I.) | 31 March 1950 |
| Health Services Acts Amendment Act (Northern Ireland) 1950 | 1950 c. 9 (N.I.) | 25 April 1950 |
| Local Government (Superannuation) Act (Northern Ireland) 1950 | 1950 c. 10 (N.I.) | 4 May 1950 |
An Act to provide for the establishment of the Northern Ireland Local Government Officers' Superannuation Committee; to empower the Ministry of Health and Local Government to make provision, by regulations to be administered by the said Committee, for the grant of superannuation benefits to or in respect of officers of local authorities and certain other bodies; to repeal, with certain savings, the existing law relating to the superannuation of officers of local authorities; and for purposes connected with the matters aforesaid.
| Civil Defence Act (Northern Ireland) 1950 (repealed) | 1950 c. 11 (N.I.) | 30 May 1950 |
(Repealed by Civil Contingencies Act 2004 (c. 36))
| Statutory Rules (Period of Laying) Act (Northern Ireland) 1950 | 1950 c. 12 (N.I.) | 30 May 1950 |
| Control of Greyhounds etc. Act (Northern Ireland) 1950 | 1950 c. 13 (N.I.) | 27 June 1950 |
An Act to provide for the muzzling and control of greyhounds in public places; to restrict the number of greyhounds which may be exercised or led by any one person in a public place; and for purposes connected with the matters aforesaid.
| Appropriation Act (Northern Ireland) 1950 | 1950 c. 14 (N.I.) | 27 June 1950 |
| Erne Drainage and Development Act (Northern Ireland) 1950 (repealed) | 1950 c. 15 (N.I.) | 27 June 1950 |
(Repealed by Drainage (Northern Ireland) Order 1973 (SI 1973/69)
| Finance Act (Northern Ireland) 1950 | 1950 c. 16 (N.I.) | 27 June 1950 |
| Road Races Act (Northern Ireland) 1950 (repealed) | 1950 c. 17 (N.I.) | 27 June 1950 |
(Repealed by Road Races (Northern Ireland) Order 1977 (SI 1977/2155)
| Poultry Hatcheries Act (Northern Ireland) 1950 | 1950 c. 18 (N.I.) | 25 July 1950 |
| Local Government (Finance) (Miscellaneous Provisions) Act (Northern Ireland) 1950 | 1950 c. 19 (N.I.) | 25 July 1950 |
| Education (Extension of Benefits) Act (Northern Ireland) 1950 (repealed) | 1950 c. 20 (N.I.) | 25 July 1950 |
An Act to extend certain benefits which, under the Education Act (Northern Ireland), 1947, (Note: Education Act (Northern Ireland) 1947 (c. 3 (N.I.))) may be provided for pupils undergoing further education; to make provision for the grant of certain scholarships under section seventy-six of that Act without regard to the means of the parents of pupils concerned; and for purposes connected with those matters. (Repealed by Education and Libraries (Northern Ireland) Order 1972 (SI 1972/1263)
| Housing on Farms Act (Northern Ireland) 1950 | 1950 c. 21 (N.I.) | 25 July 1950 |
| Local Government (Superannuation) (Amendment) Act (Northern Ireland) 1950 | 1950 c. 22 (N.I.) | 25 July 1950 |
| Health Services (Temporary Provisions) Act (Northern Ireland) 1950 | 1950 c. 23 (N.I.) | 25 July 1950 |
| Company Law Amendment Act (Northern Ireland) 1950 | 1950 c. 24 (N.I.) | 28 November 1950 |
| Ryegrass Seed (Temporary Provisions) (Extension) Act (Northern Ireland) 1950 | 1950 c. 25 (N.I.) | 28 November 1950 |
| Wild Birds Protection Act (Northern Ireland) 1950 | 1950 c. 26 (N.I.) | 28 November 1950 |
| Industries Development Act (Northern Ireland) 1950 | 1950 c. 27 (N.I.) | 21 December 1950 |
| Appropriation (No. 2) Act (Northern Ireland) 1950 | 1950 c. 28 (N.I.) | 21 December 1950 |
| Employment and Training Act (Northern Ireland) 1950 | 1950 c. 29 (N.I.) | 21 December 1950 |
An Act to make provision with respect to employment and the training of persons for employment; and for purposes connected therewith.
| Expiring Laws Continuance Act (Northern Ireland) 1950 | 1950 c. 30 (N.I.) | 21 December 1950 |
| Milk Act (Northern Ireland) 1950 | 1950 c. 31 (N.I.) | 21 December 1950 |
| Finance (No. 2) Act (Northern Ireland) 1950 | 1950 c. 32 (N.I.) | 21 December 1950 |
An Act to alter the excise duties on licences for certain mechanically propelled vehicles; to amend the law with respect to those duties; to amend the Finance (Entertainments Duty) Act (Northern Ireland), 1949, (Note: Finance (Entertainments Duty) Act (Northern Ireland) 1949 (c. 23 (N.I.))) with respect to certain penalties which may be imposed thereunder; and to exempt from stamp duties transfers of certain stocks the payment of principal and interest on which has been guaranteed by the Ministry of Finance.
| Teachers (Superannuation) Act (Northern Ireland) 1950 (repealed) | 1950 c. 33 (N.I.) | 21 December 1950 |
(Repealed by Superannuation (Northern Ireland) Order 1972 (SI 1972/1073)

=== Local acts ===
| Short title, or popular name | Citation | Royal assent |
Long title
| Ministry of Health and Local Government Provisional Order Confirmation (Bangor Borough Extension) Act (Northern Ireland) 1950 | 1950 c. i (N.I.) | 10 January 1950 |
| Ministry of Health and Local Government Provisional Order Confirmation (Newtownards Borough Extension) Act (Northern Ireland) 1950 | 1950 c. ii (N.I.) | 10 January 1950 |
| Belfast Corporation (Connswater Improvement, etc.) Act (Northern Ireland) 1950 | 1950 c. iii (N.I.) | 28 November 1950 |
| Belfast Harbour Act (Northern Ireland) 1950 | 1950 c. iv (N.I.) | 28 November 1950 |

== 1951 ==
=== Public acts ===
| Short title, or popular name | Citation | Royal assent |
Long title
| Short Titles Act (Northern Ireland) 1951 | 1951 c. 1 (N.I.) | 23 January 1951 |
An Act to confer short titles on certain Acts of the Irish Parliament and to facilitate the citation of enactments by short titles.
| Re-equipment of Industry Act (Northern Ireland) 1951 | 1951 c. 2 (N.I.) | 23 January 1951 |
| Statutory Charges Register Act (Northern Ireland) 1951 | 1951 c. 3 (N.I.) | 23 January 1951 |
| Game Law Amendment Act (Northern Ireland) 1951 | 1951 c. 4 (N.I.) | 23 January 1951 |
An Act to amend the Game Preservation Act (Northern Ireland), 1928; (Note: Game Preservation Act (Northern Ireland) 1928 (18 & 19 Geo. 5. c. 25 (N.I.))) to repeal certain enactments, including certain enactments of the Irish Parliament, relating to the preservation of game; and for purposes connected with those matters.
| Administrative and Financial Provisions Act (Northern Ireland) 1951 | 1951 c. 5 (N.I.) | 23 January 1951 |
| Census Act (Northern Ireland) 1951 | 1951 c. 6 (N.I.) | 23 January 1951 |
| Law Reform (Miscellaneous Provisions) Act (Northern Ireland) 1951 | 1951 c. 7 (N.I.) | 13 February 1951 |
| Electricity (Supply) (Amendment) Act (Northern Ireland) 1951 (repealed) | 1951 c. 8 (N.I.) | 29 March 1951 |
(Repealed by Electricity Supply (Northern Ireland) Order 1972 (SI 1972/1072)
| Local Government (Superannuation) (Amendment) Act (Northern Ireland) 1951 (repealed) | 1951 c. 9 (N.I.) | 29 March 1951 |
(Repealed by Superannuation (Northern Ireland) Order 1972 (SI 1972/1073)
| Education (Amendment) Act (Northern Ireland) 1951 (repealed) | 1951 c. 10 (N.I.) | 29 March 1951 |
An Act to make provision with respect to the powers of the Ministry of Education to make grants towards certain National Insurance contributions; to amend sections two, five, fifty-one, fifty-three, sixty-eight, eighty-one, ninety-five, one hundred and six and one hundred and nine of, and the Sixth Schedule to, the Education Act (Northern Ireland), 1947; (Note: Education Act (Northern Ireland) 1947 (c. 3 (N.I.))) to provide for the transfer of certain schools and institutions; to repeal certain enactments relating to education; and for purposes connected with the matters aforesaid. (Repealed by Education and Libraries (Northern Ireland) Order 1972 (SI 1972/1263)
| Consolidated Fund Act (Northern Ireland) 1951 (repealed) | 1951 c. 11 (N.I.) | 29 March 1951 |
(Repealed by Statute Law Revision (Northern Ireland) Act 1973 (c. 55))
| Finance Act 1948 (Amendment) Act (Northern Ireland) 1951 | 1951 c. 12 (N.I.) | 22 May 1951 |
| Housing Act (Northern Ireland) 1951 | 1951 c. 13 (N.I.) | 19 June 1951 |
An Act to amend certain enactments and to repeal other enactments relating to housing; to alter the law with respect to financial assistance to persons providing housing accommodation; and for purposes connected with the matters aforesaid.
| Appropriation Act (Northern Ireland) 1951 (repealed) | 1951 c. 14 (N.I.) | 19 June 1951 |
(Repealed by Statute Law Revision (Northern Ireland) Act 1973 (c. 55))
| National Assistance (Amendment) Act (Northern Ireland) 1951 | 1951 c. 15 (N.I.) | 24 July 1951 |
| Workmens' Compensation (Supplementation) Act (Northern Ireland) 1951 | 1951 c. 16 (N.I.) | 24 July 1951 |
| Finance Act (Northern Ireland) 1951 | 1951 c. 17 (N.I.) | 23 August 1951 |
| National Insurance Act (Northern Ireland) 1951 | 1951 c. 18 (N.I.) | 23 August 1951 |
| Public Order Act (Northern Ireland) 1951 (repealed) | 1951 c. 19 (N.I.) | 23 August 1951 |
An Act to make certain provision with respect to the maintenance of public order and the prevention of disturbance of public meetings, and for purposes connected with the matters aforesaid. (Repealed by Public Order (Northern Ireland) Order 1981 (SI 1981/609))
| Judicial Pensions Act (Northern Ireland) 1951 | 1951 c. 20 (N.I.) | 23 August 1951 |
An Act to amend the law relating to the pensions and other benefits payable to and in respect of certain persons who administer justice, and for purposes connected therewith.
| Health Services (Hospitals Endowments) Act (Northern Ireland) 1951 | 1951 c. 21 (N.I.) | 23 August 1951 |
| Transport (Special Inquiries) Act (Northern Ireland) 1951 | 1951 c. 22 (N.I.) | 23 August 1951 |
An Act to make provision with respect to the holding of certain inquiries by the Transport Tribunal for Northern Ireland.
| Rent Restriction Law (Amendment) Act (Northern Ireland) 1951 | 1951 c. 23 (N.I.) | 23 August 1951 |
| Criminal Procedure Act (Northern Ireland) 1951 (repealed) | 1951 c. 24 (N.I.) | 20 December 1951 |
(Repealed by Statute Law Revision (Northern Ireland) Act 1973 (c. 55))
| Age of Marriage Act (Northern Ireland) 1951 | 1951 c. 25 (N.I.) | 20 December 1951 |
An Act to make void marriages between persons either of whom is under the age of sixteen.
| Appropriation (No. 2) Act (Northern Ireland) 1951 (repealed) | 1951 c. 26 (N.I.) | 20 December 1951 |
(Repealed by Statute Law Revision (Northern Ireland) Act 1973 (c. 55))
| Expiring Laws Continuance Act (Northern Ireland) 1951 (repealed) | 1951 c. 27 (N.I.) | 20 December 1951 |
(Repealed by Statute Law Revision (Northern Ireland) Act 1973 (c. 55))
| Superannuation (Miscellaneous Provisions) Act (Northern Ireland) 1951 | 1951 c. 28 (N.I.) | 20 December 1951 |
An Act to amend the law relating to the superannuation of teachers and the law relating to pensions and other similar payments to be made to and in respect of persons who have been in certain employment; to make further provision with respect to the superannuation of civil servants; and for purposes connected with the matters aforesaid.
| Fishing Licences (Londonderry District) Act (Northern Ireland) 1951 | 1951 c. 29 (N.I.) | 20 December 1951 |
| Exported Animals (Compensation) Act (Northern Ireland) 1951 | 1951 c. 30 (N.I.) | 20 December 1951 |

=== Local acts ===
| Short title, or popular name | Citation | Royal assent |
Long title
| Pier and Harbour Order (Londonderry) Confirmation Act (Northern Ireland) 1951 | 1951 c. i (N.I.) | 23 August 1951 |
| Newry Urban District Council and Newry Port and Harbour Trust Act (Northern Ireland) 1951 | 1951 c. ii (N.I.) | 23 August 1951 |
| Presbyterian Widows' Fund Association Act (Northern Ireland) 1951 | 1951 c. iii (N.I.) | 20 December 1951 |

== 1952 ==
| Short title, or popular name | Citation | Royal assent |
Long title
| Statute Law Revision Act (Northern Ireland) 1952 | 1952 c. 1 (N.I.) | 11 February 1952 |
An Act to authorise and facilitate the publication of a revised edition of the statutes affecting Northern Ireland, and to promote further the revision of the statute law by repealing enactments which have ceased to be in force or have become unnecessary, and for purposes connected with those matters.
| Business Tenancies (Temporary Provisions) Act (Northern Ireland) 1952 | 1952 c. 2 (N.I.) | 11 February 1952 |
| Development of Tourist Traffic (Amendment) Act (Northern Ireland) 1952 | 1952 c. 3 (N.I.) | 11 February 1952 |
| Consolidated Fund Act (Northern Ireland) 1952 | 1952 c. 4 (N.I.) | 25 March 1952 |
| Foyle Fisheries Act (Northern Ireland) 1952 | 1952 c. 5 (N.I.) | 25 March 1952 |
An Act to authorise the making of a certain agreement with respect to fishing rights in the tidal waters of the Lough and River Foyle and its tributaries, to provide for the management, conservation, protection and improvement of the fisheries in the Foyle Area, to establish a Foyle Fisheries Commission and to define its functions, to dissolve the board of conservators for the Londonderry district, and to provide for other matters (including the charging of fees on certain fishing licences) connected with the matters aforesaid.
| House to House Charitable Collections Act (Northern Ireland) 1952 (repealed) | 1952 c. 6 (N.I.) | 6 May 1952 |
An Act to provide for the regulation of house to house collections for charitable purposes; and for matters connected therewith. (Repealed by Charities Act (Northern Ireland) 2008 (c. 12 (N.I.)))
| Administrative and Financial Provisions Act (Northern Ireland) 1952 | 1952 c. 7 (N.I.) | 27 May 1952 |
An Act to amend the law with respect to certain administrative and financial matters and for purposes connected therewith.
| County Court Judges' Salaries Act (Northern Ireland) 1952 | 1952 c. 8 (N.I.) | 27 May 1952 |
| Appropriation Act (Northern Ireland) Act 1952 (repealed) | 1952 c. 9 (N.I.) | 3 June 1952 |
(Repealed by Statute Law Revision (Northern Ireland) Act 1973 (c. 55))
| National Assistance (Amendment) Act (Northern Ireland) Act 1952 | 1952 c. 10 (N.I.) | 3 June 1952 |
| Health Services (Administrative Provisions) Act (Northern Ireland) Act 1952 | 1952 c. 11 (N.I.) | 10 June 1952 |
| Protection of Animals Act (Northern Ireland) 1952 | 1952 c. 12 (N.I.) | 1 July 1952 |
| Finance Act (Northern Ireland) 1952 | 1952 c. 13 (N.I.) | 1 July 1952 |
An Act to amend the law relating to certain existing duties; to impose a duty of excise on football betting; and to make further provision with regard to certain duties, funds and contributions and otherwise in connection with finance.
| Family Allowance and National Insurance Act (Northern Ireland) 1952 | 1952 c. 14 (N.I.) | 1 July 1952 |
| Ministerial Offices Act (Northern Ireland) 1952 (repealed) | 1952 c. 15 (N.I.) | |
An Act to make provision for the membership of the Northern Ireland Parliament and the exercise of powers and functions of the Cabinet in relation to Northern Ireland. (Repealed by Northern Ireland Act 1998 (c. 47)
| Drainage Act (Northern Ireland) 1952 (repealed) | 1952 c. 16 (N.I.) | |
An Act to consolidate certain enactments relating to the drainage of land in Northern Ireland. (Repealed by Drainage (Northern Ireland) Order 1973 (SI 1973/69)
| Education (Miscellaneous Provisions) Act (Northern Ireland) 1952 (repealed) | 1952 c. 17 (N.I.) | 3 July 1952 |
An Act to amend sections fifty-one and one hundred and ten of the Education Act (Northern Ireland), 1947; (Note: Education Act (Northern Ireland) 1947 (c. 3 (N.I.))) to provide for the making of contracts for certain types of building; to enable the Ministry of Education to give effect to the report of a committee appointed to consider teachers' salaries; and for purposes connected with the matters aforesaid. (Repealed by Education and Libraries (Northern Ireland) Order 1972 (SI 1972/1263)
| Flax Act (Northern Ireland) 1952 | 1952 c. 18 (N.I.) | |
An Act to amend the law relating to the growing of flax and the sale of flax and flax seed in Northern Ireland.
| Married Women (Restraint Upon Anticipation) Act (Northern Ireland) 1952 | 1952 c. 19 (N.I.) | 6 November 1952 |
An Act to render inoperative any restriction upon anticipation or alienation attached to the enjoyment of property by a woman.
| Appropriation (No. 2) Act (Northern Ireland) 1952 (repealed) | 1952 c. 20 (N.I.) | 18 November 1952 |
(Repealed by Statute Law Revision (Northern Ireland) Act 1973 (c. 55))
| Industrial and Provident Societies Act (Northern Ireland) 1952 | 1952 c. 21 (N.I.) | 9 December 1952 |
An Act to consolidate the Industrial and Provident Societies Acts 1893 to 1953.
| Queen's University of Belfast (Trusts) Act (Northern Ireland) 1952 | 1952 c. 22 (N.I.) | 9 December 1952 |
An Act to make provision with respect to trust property held by or on behalf of, or for purposes connected with, the Queen's University of Belfast.
| Corneal Grafting Act (Northern Ireland) 1952 | 1952 c. 23 (N.I.) | 9 December 1952 |
An Act to make provision for the use of parts of the eyes of deceased persons for the restoration of sight.
| Exported Animals (Compensation) Act (Northern Ireland) 1952 | 1952 c. 24 (N.I.) | 9 December 1952 |
An Act to consolidate the enactments relating to the establishment, maintenance and management of a fund for the payment of compensation to the owners of certain live stock exported from Northern Ireland and slaughtered or detained under the authority of law at a port in Great Britain in consequence of an outbreak, or suspected outbreak or apprehended danger, of foot and mouth disease, and to the investigation and determination of claims for such compensation.
| Pensions (Increase) Act (Northern Ireland) 1952 | 1952 c. 25 (N.I.) | 9 December 1952 |
| Expiring Laws Continuance Act (Northern Ireland) 1952 (repealed) | 1952 c. 26 (N.I.) | 30 December 1952 |
An Act to continue certain expiring laws in Northern Ireland. (Repealed by Statute Law Revision (Northern Ireland) Act 1973 (c. 55))

== 1953 ==
=== Public acts ===
| Short title, or popular name | Citation | Royal assent |
Long title
| Statute Law Revision Act (Northern Ireland) 1953 | 1953 c. 1 (N.I.) | 17 February 1953 |
An Act to repeal certain enactments which have ceased to be in force or have become unnecessary, to amend the short title of 2 Anne c.5 (Ir.), (Note: Treason Act (Ireland) 1703 (2 Anne c. 5 (I))) and for purposes connected with the matters aforesaid.
| Forestry Act (Northern Ireland) 1953 (repealed) | 1953 c. 2 (N.I.) | 17 February 1953 |
An Act for the advancement of forestry and for purposes connected with that matter. (Repealed by Forestry Act (Northern Ireland) 2010 (c. 10 (N.I.)))
| Summary Jurisdiction Act (Northern Ireland) 1953 | 1953 c. 3 (N.I.) | 17 February 1953 |
An Act to provide for the making of summary jurisdiction rules; to extend the jurisdiction and powers of, and to amend the law relating to, courts of summary jurisdiction and justices out of petty sessions; and otherwise to make provision with respect to summary procedure and offences.
| Heating Appliances (Fireguards) Act (Northern Ireland) 1953 | 1953 c. 4 (N.I.) | 17 February 1953 |
| Repeal of Unnecessary Laws Act (Northern Ireland) 1953 | 1953 c. 5 (N.I.) | 17 February 1953 |
An Act to repeal certain enactments and to make provision for certain matters arising out of such repeal.
| Health Services Act (Northern Ireland) 1953 | 1953 c. 6 (N.I.) | 17 February 1953 |
| Transport Tribunal (First Chairman) (Amendment) Act (Northern Ireland) 1953 | 1953 c. 7 (N.I.) | 17 February 1953 |
An Act to extend the term of office of the first Chairman of the Transport Tribunal for Northern Ireland, and for purposes related to such extension.
| Re-equipment of Industry (Amendment) Act (Northern Ireland) 1953 | 1953 c. 8 (N.I.) | 17 February 1953 |
| Consolidated Fund Act (Northern Ireland) 1953 (repealed) | 1953 c. 9 (N.I.) | 26 March 1953 |
(Repealed by Statute Law Revision (Northern Ireland) Act 1973 (c. 55))
| Valuation Acts Amendment Act (Northern Ireland) 1953 (repealed) | 1953 c. 10 (N.I.) | 31 March 1953 |
(Repealed by Rates (Northern Ireland) Order 1972 (SI 1972/1633)
| Education (Amendment) Act (Northern Ireland) 1953 (repealed) | 1953 c. 11 (N.I.) | 31 March 1953 |
An Act to amend sections seventy-five and one hundred and nine of the Education Act (Northern Ireland), 1947; (Note: Education Act (Northern Ireland) 1947 (c. 3 (N.I.))) to repeal the Prevention of Cruelty to Children Act, 1904; (Note: Prevention of Cruelty to Children Act 1904 (4 Edw. 7. c. 15)) and for related purposes. (Repealed by Education and Libraries (Northern Ireland) Order 1972 (SI 1972/1263)
| Local Offices (Extension) Act (Northern Ireland) 1953 | 1953 c. 12 (N.I.) | 21 April 1953 |
| Public Works &c Loans Act (Northern Ireland) 1953 | 1953 c. 13 (N.I.) | 28 April 1953 |
| Criminal Justice Act (Northern Ireland) 1953 | 1953 c. 14 (N.I.) | 5 May 1953 |
An Act to abolish penal servitude, hard labour and prison divisions and to make further provision for dealing with offenders and for the administration of criminal justice; to amend the law relating to certain criminal offences; to confer powers on courts of quarter sessions with respect to the adjournment of criminal and other appeals pending in such courts; and for purposes connected with the aforesaid matters or any of them.
| Electricity (Supply) (Amendment) Act (Northern Ireland) 1953 (repealed) | 1953 c. 15 (N.I.) | 19 May 1953 |
(Repealed by Electricity Supply (Northern Ireland) Order 1972 (SI 1972/1072)
| Diseases of Animals Acts (Amendment) Act (Northern Ireland) 1953 | 1953 c. 16 (N.I.) | 19 May 1953 |
| Industries Development (Amendment) Act (Northern Ireland) 1953 | 1953 c. 17 (N.I.) | 19 May 1953 |
| Prison Act (Northern Ireland) 1953 or the Prisons Act (Northern Ireland) 1953 | 1953 c. 18 (N.I.) | 19 May 1953 |
An Act to repeal and re-enact with amendments certain enactments relating to the confinement and treatment of prisoners, the administration of prisons, and offences arising in connection therewith; and for purposes connected with the matters aforesaid.
| Juries Act (Northern Ireland) 1953 | 1953 c. 19 (N.I.) | 19 May 1953 |
| Appropriation Act (Northern Ireland) 1953 (repealed) | 1953 c. 20 (N.I.) | 19 May 1953 |
(Repealed by Statute Law Revision (Northern Ireland) Act 1973 (c. 55))
| Slaughter-Houses Act (Northern Ireland) 1953 | 1953 c. 21 (N.I.) | 7 July 1953 |
An Act to amend the law with respect to slaughter-houses, and for purposes connected with that matter.
| Flax (Temporary Provisions) Act (Northern Ireland) 1953 | 1953 c. 22 (N.I.) | 7 July 1953 |
| Finance Act (Northern Ireland) 1953 | 1953 c. 23 (N.I.) | 7 July 1953 |
| Miscellaneous Transferred Excise Duties Act (Northern Ireland) 1953 | 1953 c. 24 (N.I.) | 7 July 1953 |
| Great Northern Railway Act (Northern Ireland) 1953 | 1953 c. 25 (N.I.) | 7 July 1953 |
An Act to give effect to arrangements for the future operation of the undertaking of the Great Northern Railway Company (Ireland) and to provide for matters connected therewith. (An equivalent Act of the Oireachtas was also made.)
| Housing (Extension of Powers) Act (Northern Ireland) 1953 | 1953 c. 26 (N.I.) | 7 July 1953 |
| National Insurance Act (Northern Ireland) 1953 | 1953 c. 27 (N.I.) | 7 July 1953 |
| Aid to Industry Act (Northern Ireland) 1953 | 1953 c. 28 (N.I.) | 7 July 1953 |
| Electoral Law Amendment Act (Northern Ireland) 1953 | 1953 c. 29 (N.I.) | 29 September 1953 |
| National Insurance (Industrial Injuries) Act (Northern Ireland) 1953 | 1953 c. 30 (N.I.) | |
| Appropriation (No. 2) Act (Northern Ireland) 1953 (repealed) | 1953 c. 31 (N.I.) | 15 December 1953 |
(Repealed by Statute Law Revision (Northern Ireland) Act 1973 (c. 55))
| Fire Services (Amendment) Act (Northern Ireland) 1953 | 1953 c. 32 (N.I.) | 15 December 1953 |
| Control of Fertilizers Act (Northern Ireland) 1953 | 1953 c. 33 (N.I.) | 15 December 1953 |
| Expiring Laws Continuance Act (Northern Ireland) 1953 (repealed) | 1953 c. 34 (N.I.) | 15 December 1953 |
(Repealed by Statute Law Revision (Northern Ireland) Act 1973 (c. 55))

=== Local acts ===
| Short title, or popular name | Citation | Royal assent |
Long title
| Magee University College, Londonderry Act (Northern Ireland) 1953 | 1953 c. i (N.I.) | 7 July 1953 |
An Act to make provision for the dissolution of the body corporate known as Magee University College, and for the transfer of its property and liabilities to the Ministry of Education for the purpose of enabling the said Ministry to make such provisions as it thinks fit for the continuation of university education in Londonderry; and for purposes connected with the matters aforesaid.

== 1954 ==
| Short title, or popular name | Citation | Royal assent |
Long title
| Inland Navigation Act (Northern Ireland) 1954 | 1954 c. 1 (N.I.) | 2 March 1954 |
An Act to authorise the making of certain agreements transferring to the Ministry of Commerce the undertakings of the Lagan Navigation Company and the Upper Bann Navigation Trustees, to empower the said Ministry and the Ministry of Finance to exercise certain functions in relation to those undertakings and for purposes connected with the matters aforesaid.
| Electricity (Essential Supplies) Act (Northern Ireland) 1954 (repealed) | 1954 c. 2 (N.I.) | 2 March 1954 |
(Repealed by Electricity Supply (Northern Ireland) Order 1972 (SI 1972/1072)
| Finance (Miscellaneous Provisions) Act (Northern Ireland) 1954 | 1954 c. 3 (N.I.) | 9 March 1954 |
An Act to extend the power to accept property in satisfaction of death duties; to provide for certain exemptions from stamp duties and to make certain amendments to the law with respect to mechanically-propelled vehicles; and to make further provision in connection with finance.
| General Dealers (Amendment) Act (Northern Ireland) 1954 | 1954 c. 4 (N.I.) | 9 March 1954 |
An Act to exclude from the operation of the General Dealers (Ireland) Act, 1903, (Note: General Dealers (Ireland) Act 1903 (3 Edw. 7. c. 44)) transactions respecting iron.
| Agriculture (Poisonous Substances) Act (Northern Ireland) 1954 (repealed) | 1954 c. 5 (N.I.) | 23 March 1954 |
An Act to provide for the protection of employees against risks of poisoning by certain substances used in agriculture. (Repealed by Health and Safety at Work (Northern Ireland) Order 1978 (SI 1978/1039))
| Welfare Services Act (Northern Ireland) 1954 | 1954 c. 6 (N.I.) | 23 March 1954 |
| Consolidated Fund Act (Northern Ireland) 1954 (repealed) | 1954 c. 7 (N.I.) | 23 March 1954 |
(Repealed by Statute Law Revision (Northern Ireland) Act 1973 (c. 55))
| Excise (Amendment) Act (Northern Ireland) 1954 | 1954 c. 8 (N.I.) | 23 March 1954 |
| Administration of Justice Act (Northern Ireland) 1954 | 1954 c. 9 (N.I.) | 30 March 1954 |
An Act to make provision with respect to certain courthouses and courtrooms, including provision for the future maintenance and custody thereof; to provide that certain expenses shall be defrayed wholly out of voted moneys and to wind-up the Dogs Act Account and the Petty Sessions Clerks (Northern Ireland) Fund; to require certain fines to be paid into the Exchequer; to make further provision with respect to costs and expenses payable in connection with court proceedings; to alter the law regarding certain resident magistrates and officials and to make further amendments relating to the administration of justice.
| Flags and Emblems (Display) Act (Northern Ireland) 1954 (repealed) | 1954 c. 10 (N.I.) | 6 April 1954 |
An Act to make provision with respect to the display of certain flags and emblems. (Repealed by Public Order (Northern Ireland) Order 1987 (SI 1987/463)
| Common Informers Act (Northern Ireland) 1954 | 1954 c. 11 (N.I.) | 13 May 1954 |
An Act to abolish the common informer procedure.
| Fisheries (Salmon Rod Licences) Act (Northern Ireland) 1954 | 1954 c. 12 (N.I.) | 13 May 1954 |
| Housing (Permitted Price) Act (Northern Ireland) 1954 | 1954 c. 13 (N.I.) | 13 May 1954 |
| Flax Act (Northern Ireland) 1954 | 1954 c. 14 (N.I.) | 15 June 1954 |
| Capital Grants to Industry Act (Northern Ireland) 1954 | 1954 c. 15 (N.I.) | 15 June 1954 |
| Rents Tribunals (Extension of Jurisdiction) Act (Northern Ireland) 1954 | 1954 c. 16 (N.I.) | 15 June 1954 |
| Vehicles (Excise) Act (Northern Ireland) 1954 | 1954 c. 17 (N.I.) | 15 June 1954 |
| Marketing of Pigs (Amendment) Act (Northern Ireland) 1954 | 1954 c. 18 (N.I.) | 15 June 1954 |
| Pensions (Increase) Act (Northern Ireland) 1954 | 1954 c. 19 (N.I.) | 15 June 1954 |
| Wills (Amendment) Act (Northern Ireland) 1954 | 1954 c. 20 (N.I.) | 22 June 1954 |
| Marriages Act (Northern Ireland) 1954 (repealed) | 1954 c. 21 (N.I.) | 22 June 1954 |
(Repealed by Marriage (Northern Ireland) Order 2003 (SI 2003/413)
| Appropriation Act (Northern Ireland) 1954 (repealed) | 1954 c. 22 (N.I.) | 22 June 1954 |
(Repealed by Statute Law Revision (Northern Ireland) Act 1973 (c. 55))
| Finance Act (Northern Ireland) 1954 | 1954 c. 23 (N.I.) | 29 October 1954 |
An Act to amend the law relating to estate duty, stamp duties and entertainments duty, and to make further provision in connection with finance.
| Appropriation (No. 2) Act (Northern Ireland) 1954 (repealed) | 1954 c. 24 (N.I.) | 29 October 1954 |
(Repealed by Statute Law Revision (Northern Ireland) Act 1973 (c. 55))
| Expiring Laws Continuance Act (Northern Ireland) 1954 (repealed) | 1954 c. 25 (N.I.) | 2 December 1954 |
(Repealed by Statute Law Revision (Northern Ireland) Act 1973 (c. 55))
| Law Reform (Miscellaneous Provisions) Act (Northern Ireland) 1954 | 1954 c. 26 (N.I.) | 2 December 1954 |
| Charitable Trusts (Validation) Act (Northern Ireland) 1954 | 1954 c. 27 (N.I.) | 2 December 1954 |
An Act to validate and restrict to charitable objects, certain instruments taking effect before the sixteenth day of December, nineteen hundred and fifty-two, and providing for property to be held or applied for objects partly but not exclusively charitable.
| Vaughan's Charity (Administration) Act (Northern Ireland) 1954 | 1954 c. 28 (N.I.) | 2 December 1954 |
An Act to confirm and give effect to a Scheme for the future administration and control of the charity known as the Vaughan Agricultural Institute; and for purposes connected therewith.
| Higher Technological Studies Act (Northern Ireland) 1954 | 1954 c. 29 (N.I.) | 21 December 1954 |
| Pawnbrokers Act (Northern Ireland) 1954 (repealed) | 1954 c. 30 (N.I.) | 21 December 1954 |
(Repealed by Consumer Credit Act 1974 (c. 39)
| Agriculture (Temporary Assistance) Act (Northern Ireland) 1954 | 1954 c. 31 (N.I.) | 21 December 1954 |
An Act to authorise the making of schemes for giving financial assistance to the agricultural industry in Northern Ireland; and for purposes connected therewith.
| Health Services (Terms of Office) (Extension) Act (Northern Ireland) 1954 | 1954 c. 32 (N.I.) | 21 December 1954 |
| Interpretation Act (Northern Ireland) 1954 | 1954 c. 33 (N.I.) | 21 December 1954 |
An Act to make provision with respect to the operation, interpretation and citation of Acts of the Parliament of Northern Ireland and of instruments made thereunder.
| Valuation Acts Amendment Act (Northern Ireland) 1954 (repealed) | 1954 c. 34 (N.I.) | 21 December 1954 |
(Repealed by Rates (Northern Ireland) Order 1972 (SI 1972/1633)
| Statute Law Revision Act (Northern Ireland) 1954 | 1954 c. 35 (N.I.) | 21 December 1954 |
An Act to repeal certain enactments which have ceased to be in force or have become unnecessary; and for purposes connected with the matters aforesaid.
| Business Tenancies (Extension of Temporary Provisions) Act (Northern Ireland) 1954 | 1954 c. 36 (N.I.) | 21 December 1954 |

== 1955 ==
| Short title, or popular name | Citation | Royal assent |
Long title
| National Insurance Act (Northern Ireland) 1955 | 1955 c. 1 (N.I.) | 11 January 1955 |
| Government Property (Amendment) Act (Northern Ireland) 1955 | 1955 c. 2 (N.I.) | 29 March 1955 |
An Act to make provision for the reconveyance of certain property to the Minister of Works; and for purposes connected therewith.
| Bee Pest Prevention (Amendment) Act (Northern Ireland) 1955 | 1955 c. 3 (N.I.) | 29 March 1955 |
| Herbage Seeds Act (Northern Ireland) 1955 | 1955 c. 4 (N.I.) | 29 March 1955 |
| Consolidated Fund Act (Northern Ireland) 1955 (repealed) | 1955 c. 5 (N.I.) | 29 March 1955 |
(Repealed by Statute Law Revision (Northern Ireland) Act 1973 (c. 55))
| Consolidated Fund (Miscellaneous Provisions) Act (Northern Ireland) 1955 | 1955 c. 6 (N.I.) | 29 March 1955 |
An Act to make provision with respect to the borrowing of money for certain public purposes, and for matters connected therewith.
| Marketing of Pigs (Amendment) Act (Northern Ireland) 1955 | 1955 c. 7 (N.I.) | 29 March 1955 |
| Diseases of Animals (Air Transport) Act (Northern Ireland) 1955 | 1955 c. 8 (N.I.) | |
| Coroners (Amendment) Act (Northern Ireland) 1955 | 1955 c. 9 (N.I.) | |
| National Insurance (No. 2) Act (Northern Ireland) 1955 | 1955 c. 10 (N.I.) | |
| Defamation Act (Northern Ireland) 1955 | 1955 c. 11 (N.I.) | 21 June 1955 |
An Act to amend the law relating to libel and slander and other malicious falsehoods.
| Hire-Purchase Act (Northern Ireland) 1955 | 1955 c. 12 (N.I.) | 21 June 1955 |
| Public Health and Local Government (Miscellaneous Provisions) Act (Northern Ireland) 1955 | 1955 c. 13 (N.I.) | 21 June 1955 |
An Act to extend the powers of certain public authorities to supply water, to increase the amount recoverable by local authorities in respect of expenses of providing water supplies, and to provide for the incidence of certain water rates; to restrict the use of public sewers for private purposes; to regulate the provision of sanitary conveniences at certain sports grounds; to provide for the variation of stallages, rents and tolls for markets and slaughter-houses, and to declare the law touching the extent of certain slaughter-house charges; to extend the powers of certain local authorities with respect to war memorials; to enable the honorary freedom of certain boroughs to be conferred on persons other than individuals; to increase the sums which rural district councils may subscribe to their association; to empower certain local authorities to contribute towards the maintenance or establishment of certain museums; to empower urban sanitary authorities to adopt private streets; to empower certain local authorities to acquire or provide, and to furnish, accommodation for certain public purposes, and to acquire land for the purpose of such provision; to provide for the annual audit of the accounts of certain local authorities; to extend the term for the repayment of sums temporarily borrowed by local authorities; to make further provision with respect to the sealing of contracts by local authorities; to impose penalties on members of certain local authorities who participate in matters while pecuniarily interested; to provide for the variation of the rate of interest payable on certain compensation moneys; to empower certain local authorities to pay travelling and subsistence allowances to their members and to insure their members against accidents; to declare the powers of county councils with respect to the collection of rates in one sum; to empower certain local authorities to establish certain special funds; to provide for the dissolution and transfer of functions of town commissioners; to facilitate the payment of local government superannuation benefits in certain special circumstances, and make further provision as to the superannuation of certain officers of joint bodies; and for purposes connected with the matters aforesaid.
| Appropriation Act (Northern Ireland) 1955 (repealed) | 1955 c. 14 (N.I.) | 21 June 1955 |
(Repealed by Statute Law Revision (Northern Ireland) Act 1973 (c. 55))
| Lough Neagh and Lower Bann Drainage and Navigation Act (Northern Ireland) 1955 | 1955 c. 15 (N.I.) | 11 July 1955 |
An Act to make provision for lowering the levels of Lough Neagh and with respect to drainage and navigation matters arising in connection therewith and with the Lower Bann, and for purposes connected with the matters aforesaid.
| Health Services (Administrative Amendments) Act (Northern Ireland) 1955 | 1955 c. 16 (N.I.) | 11 July 1955 |
| Appropriation (No. 2) Act (Northern Ireland) 1955 (repealed) | 1955 c. 17 (N.I.) | 29 November 1955 |
(Repealed by Statute Law Revision (Northern Ireland) Act 1973 (c. 55))
| Industrial and Provident Societies (Amendment) Act (Northern Ireland) 1955 | 1955 c. 18 (N.I.) | 29 November 1955 |
| Finance (Miscellaneous Provisions) Act (Northern Ireland) 1955 | 1955 c. 19 (N.I.) | 29 November 1955 |
An Act to amend the Government Loans Acts (Northern Ireland), 1939 to 1953; to amend the law relating to certain financial matters; and for purposes connected with the matters aforesaid.
| Expiring Laws Continuance Act (Northern Ireland) 1955 (repealed) | 1955 c. 20 (N.I.) | 29 November 1955 |
(Repealed by Statute Law Revision (Northern Ireland) Act 1973 (c. 55))
| County Courts Act (Northern Ireland) 1955 | 1955 c. 21 (N.I.) | 29 November 1955 |
| Agriculture Marketing (Amendment) Act (Northern Ireland) 1955 | 1955 c. 22 (N.I.) | 13 December 1955 |
| Health Services (Temporary Provision) (Continuance) Act (Northern Ireland) 1955 | 1955 c. 23 (N.I.) | 13 December 1955 |
| Administration of Estates Act (Northern Ireland) 1955 | 1955 c. 24 (N.I.) | 13 December 1955 |
An Act to make provision with respect to the devolution and distribution of the estates of deceased persons and to amend the law with respect to the representation of deceased persons, the administration of their estates and related matters.
| Industries Development (Amendment) Act (Northern Ireland) 1955 | 1955 c. 25 (N.I.) | 13 December 1955 |
| Game Act (Amendment) Act (Northern Ireland) 1955 (repealed) | 1955 c. 26 (N.I.) | 13 December 1955 |
(Repealed by Statute Law Revision (Northern Ireland) Act 1973 (c. 55))
| Road Traffic Act (Northern Ireland) 1955 | 1955 c. 27 (N.I.) | 29 December 1955 |
| Ministerial and Other Offices Act (Northern Ireland) 1955 | 1955 c. 28 (N.I.) | 29 December 1955 |
| Registration of Births, Deaths and Marriages (Fees, etc.) Act (Northern Ireland) 1955 (repealed) | 1955 c. 29 (N.I.) | 29 December 1955 |
(Repealed by Marriage (Northern Ireland) Order 2003 (SI 2003/413)
| Drainage (Sea Defences) Act (Northern Ireland) 1955 (repealed) | 1955 c. 30 (N.I.) | 29 December 1955 |
(Repealed by Drainage (Northern Ireland) Order 1973 (SI 1973/69)
| Pharmacy and Poisons Act (Northern Ireland) 1955 | 1955 c. 31 (N.I.) | 29 December 1955 |

== 1956 ==
=== Public acts ===
| Short title, or popular name | Citation | Royal assent |
Long title
| Consolidated Fund Act (Northern Ireland) 1956 | 1956 c. 1 (N.I.) | 27 March 1956 |
| Agriculture (Extension of Temporary Assistance) Act (Northern Ireland) 1956 | 1956 c. 2 (N.I.) | 15 May 1956 |
| Agricultural Workers' Holidays Act (Northern Ireland) 1956 (repealed) | 1956 c. 3 (N.I.) | 15 May 1956 |
(Repealed by Agriculture (Miscellaneous Provisions) Act (Northern Ireland) 1967 (c. 15 (N.I.))
| Malone and Whiteabbey Training Schools Act (Northern Ireland) 1956 (repealed) | 1956 c. 4 (N.I.) | 12 June 1956 |
(Repealed by Justice (Northern Ireland) Act 2004 (c. 4)
| Births, Deaths and Marriages Registration Act (Northern Ireland) 1956 (repealed) | 1956 c. 5 (N.I.) | 5 June 1956 |
(Repealed by Marriage (Northern Ireland) Order 2003 (SI 2003/413)
| Appropriation Act (Northern Ireland) 1956 | 1956 c. 6 (N.I.) | 26 June 1956 |
| Family Allowances and National Insurance Act (Northern Ireland) 1956 | 1956 c. 7 (N.I.) | 24 July 1956 |
| Pensions (Increase) Act (Northern Ireland) 1956 | 1956 c. 8 (N.I.) | 24 July 1956 |
| Workmen's Compensation (Supplementation) Act (Northern Ireland) 1956 | 1956 c. 9 (N.I.) | 24 July 1956 |
| Housing (Miscellaneous Provisions) and Rent Restriction Law (Amendment) Act (Northern Ireland) 1956 or the Housing Act (Northern Ireland) 1956 | 1956 c. 10 (N.I.) | 6 November 1956 |
An Act to make further and better provision with respect to the improvement of the housing of the people, to amend the law relating to rent restriction, and for purposes connected with those matters.
| Finance Act (Northern Ireland) 1956 | 1956 c. 11 (N.I.) | |
| Slaughter of Animals (Amendment) Act (Northern Ireland) 1956 (repealed) | 1956 c. 12 (N.I.) | 4 December 1956 |
(Repealed by Welfare of Animals (Slaughter or Killing) Regulations (Northern Ireland) 1996 (SR(NI) 1996/558))
| Fire Services (Amendment) Act (Northern Ireland) 1956 | 1956 c. 13 (N.I.) | 4 December 1956 |
| Expiring Laws Continuance Act (Northern Ireland) 1956 | 1956 c. 14 (N.I.) | 4 December 1956 |
| Educational Endowments (Confirmation of Schemes) Act (Northern Ireland) 1956 | 1956 c. 15 (N.I.) | 4 December 1956 |
An Act to confirm, with modifications, certain educational endowments schemes; and for purposes connected therewith.
| Appropriation (No. 2) Act (Northern Ireland) 1956 | 1956 c. 16 (N.I.) | 4 December 1956 |
| Administrative and Financial Provisions Act (Northern Ireland) 1956 | 1956 c. 17 (N.I.) | 4 December 1956 |
An Act to make certain amendments in the law relating to holdings subject to land purchase annuity; to amend the law with respect to the duration and cost of firearm certificates and permits; to make further provision with respect to the salary of the Comptroller and Auditor-General; to make further provision with respect to public accounts and the receipt, issue, borrowing and funding of public moneys; to provide for the variation of the rate of interest payable on certain compensation moneys; and otherwise to amend the law with respect to certain administrative and financial matters and with respect to certain functions of the Ministry of Finance.
| Capital Grants to Industry (Amendment) Act (Northern Ireland) 1956 | 1956 c. 18 (N.I.) | 20 December 1956 |
| Criminal Injuries Act (Northern Ireland) 1956 | 1956 c. 19 (N.I.) | 20 December 1956 |
| Business Tenancies (Extension of Temporary Provisions) Act (Northern Ireland) 1956 | 1956 c. 20 (N.I.) | 20 December 1956 |
| Harbour Authorities (Charges and Borrowing Powers) Act (Northern Ireland) 1956 | 1956 c. 21 (N.I.) | 20 December 1956 |
| Teachers (Superannuation) (Amendment) Act (Northern Ireland) 1956 (repealed) | 1956 c. 22 (N.I.) | 20 December 1956 |
(Repealed by Superannuation (Northern Ireland) Order 1972 (SI 1972/1073)
| Rating and Valuation (Amendment) Act (Northern Ireland) 1956 (repealed) | 1956 c. 23 (N.I.) | 20 December 1956 |
(Repealed by Rates (Northern Ireland) Order 1972 (SI 1972/1633)
| Education (Amendment) Act (Northern Ireland) 1956 | 1956 c. 24 (N.I.) | 20 December 1956 |
An Act to amend the law with respect to certain educational and other functions relating to children and to make further provision with respect to certain educational endowments; and for purposes connected with the matters aforesaid.

=== Local acts ===
| Short title, or popular name | Citation | Royal assent |
Long title
| Ministry of Health and Local Government Provision Order Confirmation (Bangor Borough Extension) Act (Northern Ireland) 1956 | 1956 c. i (N.I.) | 1 May 1956 |
| Ministry of Health and' Local Government Provisional Order Confirmation (Lame Borough Extension) Act (Northern Ireland) 1956 | 1956 c. ii (N.I.) | 1 May 1956 |
| Belfast Corporation (Blackstaff River Improvement, etc.) Act (Northern Ireland) 1956 | 1956 c. iii (N.I.) | 26 June 1956 |
| Belfast Harbour Act (Northern Ireland) 1956 | 1956 c. iv (N.I.) | 6 November 1956 |
| River Bann Navigation Act (Northern Ireland) 1956 | 1956 c. v (N.I.) | 6 November 1956 |

== 1957 ==
=== Public acts ===
| Short title, or popular name | Citation | Royal assent |
Long title
| Friendly Societies Act (Northern Ireland) 1957 | 1957 c. 1 (N.I.) | 28 March 1957 |
An Act to extend the powers of friendly societies, and amend the Friendly Societies Acts (Northern Ireland), 1896 to 1948; to make corresponding amendments for trade unions in relation to annuities and sums payable on the death of a member; to make provision with respect to the furnishing of information by the Ministry of Labour and National Insurance in connection with claims for benefit from friendly societies and trade unions; to make provision as to the effect of adoption orders; and for purposes connected therewith.
| Consolidated Fund Act (Northern Ireland) 1957 | 1957 c. 2 (N.I.) | 28 March 1957 |
| Agriculture (Temporary Assistance) (Amendment) Act (Northern Ireland) 1957 | 1957 c. 3 (N.I.) | 28 March 1957 |
An Act to amend the Agriculture (Temporary Assistance) Act (Northern Ireland), 1954. (Note: Agriculture (Temporary Assistance) Act (Northern Ireland) 1954 (c. 31 (N.I.)))
| Auctions (Local Control) Act (Northern Ireland) 1957 | 1957 c. 4 (N.I.) | 18 April 1957 |
| Revaluation (Amendment and Consequential Provisions) Act (Northern Ireland) 1957 | 1957 c. 5 (N.I.) | 18 April 1957 |
| Acquisition of War-Damaged Land (Compensation) Act (Northern Ireland) 1957 | 1957 c. 6 (N.I.) | 11 June 1957 |
| National Insurance Act (Northern Ireland) 1957 | 1957 c. 7 (N.I.) | 21 June 1957 |
| Criminal Injuries Act (Northern Ireland) 1957 | 1957 c. 8 (N.I.) | 2 July 1957 |
| Midgley (Pension) Act (Northern Ireland) 1957 | 1957 c. 9 (N.I.) | 2 July 1957 |
| Government Loans Act (Northern Ireland) 1957 | 1957 c. 10 (N.I.) | 2 July 1957 |
| Appropriation Act (Northern Ireland) 1957 | 1957 c. 11 (N.I.) | 2 July 1957 |
| Health Service Contributions Act (Northern Ireland) 1957 | 1957 c. 12 (N.I.) | 29 July 1957 |
| Land Registry Charges Act (Northern Ireland) 1957 | 1957 c. 13 (N.I.) | 29 July 1957 |
| Parliamentary Elections Procedure Act (Northern Ireland) 1957 | 1957 c. 14 (N.I.) | 29 July 1957 |
| Finance Act (Northern Ireland) 1957 | 1957 c. 15 (N.I.) | 29 July 1957 |
An Act to amend the law relating to estate duty; to provide an alternative method of appealing against the assessment of stamp duty where the only question in dispute is the value of land; to made further and better provision for the recovery of mineral rights duty and of penalties incurred in connection therewith; to alter the law with respect to entertainments duty; to impose an excise duty on certain television licences; to amend the law relating to the duties aforesaid; and to make further provision in connection with finance.
| Sale of Cream Act (Northern Ireland) 1957 | 1957 c. 16 (N.I.) | 29 July 1957 |
| Appropriation (No. 2) Act (Northern Ireland) 1957 | 1957 c. 17 (N.I.) | 29 July 1957 |
| Transport (Amendment) Act (Northern Ireland) 1957 | 1957 c. 18 (N.I.) | 29 July 1957 |
An Act to make certain provision consequential upon the termination of certain railway services in Northern Ireland.
| Betting and Lotteries Act (Northern Ireland) 1957 | 1957 c. 19 (N.I.) | 29 July 1957 |
| Registration of Deeds (Amendment) Act (Northern Ireland) 1957 | 1957 c. 20 (N.I.) | 26 November 1957 |
| Appropriation (No. 3) Act (Northern Ireland) 1957 | 1957 c. 21 (N.I.) | 12 December 1957 |
| Expiring Laws Continuance Act (Northern Ireland) 1957 | 1957 c. 22 (N.I.) | 12 December 1957 |
| King George VI Memorial Youth Council Act (Northern Ireland) 1957 | 1957 c. 23 (N.I.) | 12 December 1957 |
An Act to provide for the establishment and functioning of the King George VI Northern Ireland Youth Council; to authorise and give effect to an agreement for conveying to that Council certain lands in May Street in the City of Belfast and for the erection thereon by that Council of a building as a memorial to His late Majesty King George the Sixth and for use as a Youth Centre; and for purposes connected with the matters aforesaid or any of them.
| Finance (No. 2) Act (Northern Ireland) 1957 | 1957 c. 24 (N.I.) | 12 December 1957 |
| Occupiers' Liability Act (Northern Ireland) 1957 | 1957 c. 25 (N.I.) | 12 December 1957 |
An Act to amend the law as to the liability of occupiers and others for injury or damage resulting to persons or goods lawfully on any land or other property from dangers due to the state of the property or to things done or omitted to be done there, and for purposes connected therewith.
| National Insurance (No. 2) Act (Northern Ireland) 1957 | 1957 c. 26 (N.I.) | 12 December 1957 |
| Marketing of Eggs Act (Northern Ireland) 1957 | 1957 c. 27 (N.I.) | 19 December 1957 |
An Act to amend and consolidate the Marketing of Eggs Acts (Northern Ireland), 1924 to 1937.
| Business Tenancies (Extension of Temporary Provisions) Act (Northern Ireland) 1957 | 1957 c. 28 (N.I.) | 19 December 1957 |
| Sale of Ice-Cream Act (Northern Ireland) 1957 | 1957 c. 29 (N.I.) | 19 December 1957 |
| Urban Drainage Act (Northern Ireland) 1957 (repealed) | 1957 c. 30 (N.I.) | 19 December 1957 |
(Repealed by Drainage (Northern Ireland) Order 1973 (SI 1973/69)

=== Local acts ===
| Short title, or popular name | Citation | Royal assent |
Long title
| Ministry of Health and Local Government Provisional Order Confirmation (Lurgan Borough Extension) Act (Northern Ireland) 1957 | 1957 c. i (N.I.) | 4 June 1957 |
| Newtownabbey Urban District Act (Northern Ireland) 1957 | 1957 c. ii (N.I.) | 29 July 1957 |

== 1958 ==
| Short title, or popular name | Citation | Royal assent |
Long title
| Local Government (Finance) Act (Northern Ireland) Act 1958 | 1958 c. 1 (N.I.) | 7 January 1958 |
| Health Services (Hospital Gifts) Act (Northern Ireland) Act 1958 | 1958 c. 2 (N.I.) | 27 February 1958 |
| Housing Associations Act (Northern Ireland) Act 1958 (repealed) | 1958 c. 3 (N.I.) | 27 February 1958 |
(Repealed by Housing (Northern Ireland) Order 1976 (SI 1976/1780))
| Appropriation Act (Northern Ireland) Act 1958 | 1958 c. 4 (N.I.) | 27 February 1958 |
| County Courts (Amendment) Act (Northern Ireland) 1958 | 1958 c. 5 (N.I.) | 10 June 1958 |
| Health Service Contributions Act (Northern Ireland) 1958 | 1958 c. 6 (N.I.) | 10 June 1958 |
| Ulster Folk Museum Act (Northern Ireland) 1958 | 1958 c. 7 (N.I.) | 10 June 1958 |
| Legitimation (Re-registration of Birth) Act (Northern Ireland) 1958 | 1958 c. 8 (N.I.) | 10 June 1958 |
| Summary Jurisdiction and Criminal Justice Act (Northern Ireland) 1958 | 1958 c. 9 (N.I.) | 1 July 1958 |
An Act to make further provision with respect to courts of summary jurisdiction and in relation to the administration of criminal justice.
| Statute of Limitations Act (Northern Ireland) 1958 | 1958 c. 10 (N.I.) | 1 July 1958 |
| Criminal Injuries (Amendment) Act (Northern Ireland) 1958 | 1958 c. 11 (N.I.) | 1 July 1958 |
| Appropriation (No. 2) Act (Northern Ireland) 1958 | 1958 c. 12 (N.I.) | 1 July 1958 |
| Diseases of Animals Act (Northern Ireland) 1958 | 1958 c. 13 (N.I.) | 29 July 1958 |
| Finance Act (Northern Ireland) 1958 | 1958 c. 14 (N.I.) | 29 July 1958 |
An Act to amend the law relating to death duties, stamp duties, entertainments duty and excise duties on mechanically-propelled vehicles, and to make further provision in connection with finance.
| Transport Act (Northern Ireland) 1958 | 1958 c. 15 (N.I.) | 29 July 1958 |
An Act to give effect to arrangements for the dissolution of the Great Northern Railway Board and the future operation of its undertaking; to amend the law relating to the Ulster Transport Authority, and for purposes connected with those matters. (An equivalent Act of the Oireachtas was also made.)
| Recreational Charities Act (Northern Ireland) 1958 | 1958 c. 16 (N.I.) | 25 November 1958 |
An Act to declare charitable the provision in the interests of social welfare of facilities for recreation or other leisure-time occupation and for purposes connected therewith.
| Appropriation (No. 3) Act (Northern Ireland) 1958 | 1958 c. 17 (N.I.) | 25 November 1958 |
| Statutory Rules Act (Northern Ireland) 1958 (repealed) | 1958 c. 18 (N.I.) | 2 December 1958 |
(Repealed by Statutory Rules (Northern Ireland) Order 1979 (SI 1979/1573))
| Industrial Assurance and Friendly Societies (Amendment) Act (Northern Ireland) 1958 | 1958 c. 19 (N.I.) | 2 December 1958 |
| Administrative and Financial Provisions Act (Northern Ireland) 1958 | 1958 c. 20 (N.I.) | 9 December 1958 |
An Act to make provision with respect to the superannuation benefits and functions of the Comptroller and Auditor-General; to authorise increases in certain charges upon the Consolidated Fund and in certain grants for youth welfare, physical training and recreation; to make provision with respect to the audit of certain educational endowments and with respect to certain loans to civil servants; to amend the Registration of Deeds Acts; to extinguish liabilities to pay, or guarantee the payment of, interest or dividends on certain share capital of the Carrickfergus Harbour Junction Light Railway Company; and for purposes connected with the matters aforesaid or any of them.
| Superannuation (Miscellaneous Provisions) Act (Northern Ireland) 1958 | 1958 c. 21 (N.I.) | 9 December 1958 |
| Expiring Laws Continuance Act (Northern Ireland) 1958 | 1958 c. 22 (N.I.) | 9 December 1958 |
| Trustee Act (Northern Ireland) 1958 | 1958 c. 23 (N.I.) | 9 December 1958 |
An Act to consolidate with amendments certain enactments to trustees.
| Trading Representations (Disabled Persons) Act (Northern Ireland) 1958 (repealed) | 1958 c. 24 (N.I.) | 9 December 1958 |
An Act to control the making of representations by traders with respect to the employment or assistance of blind or other disabled persons in connection with the production, preparation, packing or sale of goods, and for purposes connected therewith. (Repealed by Consumer Protection from Unfair Trading Regulations 2008 (SI 2008/1277))
| Local Government (Finance) (No. 2) Act (Northern Ireland) 1958 | 1958 c. 25 (N.I.) | 30 December 1958 |
| Business Tenancies (Extension of Temporary Provisions) Act (Northern Ireland) 1958 | 1958 c. 26 (N.I.) | 30 December 1958 |
| Food and Drugs Act (Northern Ireland) 1958 (repealed) | 1958 c. 27 (N.I.) | 30 December 1958 |
(Repealed by Food (Northern Ireland) Order 1989 (SI 1989/846)
| Education (Amendment) Act (Northern Ireland) 1958 (repealed) | 1958 c. 28 (N.I.) | 30 December 1958 |
An Act to amend sections twenty, thirty-eight and forty-six of the Education Act (Northern Ireland), 1947; (Note: Education Act (Northern Ireland) 1947 (c. 3 (N.I.))) to make further provision with respect to the management of institutions of further education and technical intermediate schools and with respect to the award of scholarships; to make certain minor and consequential amendments in other provisions of the said Act; and for purposes connected with the matters aforesaid. (Repealed by Education and Libraries (Northern Ireland) Order 1972 (SI 1972/1263)
| Health Services Act (Northern Ireland) 1958 | 1958 c. 29 (N.I.) | 30 December 1958 |
| Trade Disputes and Trade Unions Act (Northern Ireland) 1958 | 1958 c. 30 (N.I.) | 30 December 1958 |
| Marketing of Milk Products Act (Northern Ireland) 1958 | 1958 c. 31 (N.I.) | 30 December 1958 |
| Hotel Proprietors Act (Northern Ireland) 1958 | 1958 c. 32 (N.I.) | 30 December 1958 |
An Act to amend the law relating to inns and inn-keepers and for purposes connected with that matter.

== 1959 ==
| Short title, or popular name | Citation | Royal assent |
Long title
| Intoxicating Liquor and Licensing Act (Northern Ireland) 1959 | 1959 c. 1 (N.I.) | 27 January 1959 |
| Agriculture (Miscellaneous Provisions) Act (Northern Ireland) 1959 | 1959 c. 2 (N.I.) | 26 March 1959 |
An Act to discontinue certain payments made by local authorities for agricultural purposes; to make further provision with respect to schemes for the destruction of vermin and for purposes connected with the matters aforesaid.
| Consolidated Fund Act (Northern Ireland) 1959 | 1959 c. 3 (N.I.) | 26 March 1959 |
| Electoral Registers Act (Northern Ireland) 1959 | 1959 c. 4 (N.I.) | 12 May 1959 |
| Electricity (Borrowing Powers) Act (Northern Ireland) 1959 | 1959 c. 5 (N.I.) | 16 June 1959 |
| Capital Grants to Industry (Amendment) Act (Northern Ireland) 1959 | 1959 c. 6 (N.I.) | 16 June 1959 |
| Family Allowances and National Insurance Act (Northern Ireland) 1959 | 1959 c. 7 (N.I.) | 9 July 1959 |
| Appropriation Act (Northern Ireland) 1959 | 1959 c. 8 (N.I.) | 9 July 1959 |
| Finance Act (Northern Ireland) 1959 | 1959 c. 9 (N.I.) | 9 July 1959 |
An Act to amend the law relating to estate duty, stamp duties and certain duties of excise (including duties on mechanically-propelled vehicles and on licences for the sale of intoxicating liquor); to make further provision with respect to charges leviable under section three of the Intoxicating Liquor Act (Northern Ireland), 1923; (Note: Intoxicating Liquor Act (Northern Ireland) 1923 (13 & 14 Geo. 5. c. 12 (N.I.))) to require, and impose an excise duty on, licences authorising the supply of intoxicating liquor in the premises of registered clubs; and to make further provision in connection with finance.
| Pensions (Increase) Act (Northern Ireland) 1959 | 1959 c. 10 (N.I.) | 28 July 1959 |
| National Assistance (Amendment) Act (Northern Ireland) 1959 | 1959 c. 11 (N.I.) | 28 July 1959 |
| Appropriation (No. 2) Act (Northern Ireland) 1959 | 1959 c. 12 (N.I.) | 8 December 1959 |
| Business Tenancies (Extension of Temporary Provisions) Act (Northern Ireland) 1959 | 1959 c. 13 (N.I.) | 8 December 1959 |
| Expiring Laws Continuance Act (Northern Ireland) 1959 | 1959 c. 14 (N.I.) | 8 December 1959 |
| Coroners Act (Northern Ireland) 1959 | 1959 c. 15 (N.I.) | 8 December 1959 |
An Act to amend and consolidate the law relating to coroners.
| Factories Act (Northern Ireland) 1959 | 1959 c. 16 (N.I.) | 8 December 1959 |
| Minerals (Miscellaneous Provisions) Act (Northern Ireland) 1959 | 1959 c. 17 (N.I.) | 8 December 1959 |
An Act to make further provision for the Geological Survey of Northern Ireland; to transfer certain functions respecting mines and minerals to the Ministry of Commerce; to make further provision with respect to mines, minerals and quarries and operations connected therewith; and for purposes connected with those matters.
| Fatal Accidents Act (Northern Ireland) 1959 | 1959 c. 18 (N.I.) | 15 December 1959 |
| Nurses and Midwives Act (Northern Ireland) 1959 | 1959 c. 19 (N.I.) | 15 December 1959 |
| Cinematograph Act (Northern Ireland) 1959 | 1959 c. 20 (N.I.) | 15 December 1959 |
| National Insurance Act (Northern Ireland) 1959 | 1959 c. 21 (N.I.) | 15 December 1959 |
| Rating and Valuation (Amendment) Act (Northern Ireland) 1959 | 1959 c. 22 (N.I.) | 31 December 1959 |
| Consolidated Fund (Miscellaneous Provisions) Act (Northern Ireland) 1959 | 1959 c. 23 (N.I.) | 31 December 1959 |
| Agriculture (Safety, Health and Welfare Provisions) Act (Northern Ireland) 1959 (repealed) | 1959 c. 24 (N.I.) | 31 December 1959 |
(Repealed by Health and Safety at Work (Northern Ireland) Order 1978 (SI 1978/1039))
| County Courts Act (Northern Ireland) 1959 | 1959 c. 25 (N.I.) | 31 December 1959 |
An Act to consolidate with amendments certain enactments relating to county courts and courts of quarter sessions, and for related purposes.
| Betting and Lotteries (Amendment) Act (Northern Ireland) 1959 | 1959 c. 26 (N.I.) | 31 December 1959 |

The Parliament of Northern Ireland was prorogued on 28 March 1972, which was extended indefinitely on 30 March 1972 by s1 of the Northern Ireland (Temporary Provisions) Act 1972. The parliament was finally abolished on 18 July 1973 by s31 of the Northern Ireland Constitution Act 1973.

== See also ==
- List of acts of the Northern Ireland Assembly
- List of orders in Council for Northern Ireland

== Sources ==
- The Statute Law Database has the revised statutes of Northern Ireland (incorporating changes made by legislation up to 31 December 2005) and the Acts made since that date.
- The Belfast Gazette: Archive
