= Statute Law Revision Act (Northern Ireland) 1954 =

Act of the Parliament of Northern Ireland

Statute Law Revision Act (Northern Ireland) 1954 (Note: Section 2(1).)
- Act of Parliament
- Parliament of Northern Ireland
- Long title: An Act to repeal certain enactments which have ceased to be in force or have become unnecessary; and for purposes connected with the matters aforesaid.
- Citation: 1954 c. 35 (N.I.)
- Territorial extent: Northern Ireland

Dates
- Royal assent: 21 December 1954
- Commencement: 21 December 1954 (Note: The Acts of Parliament (Commencement) Act 1793.)
Other legislation
Amended by	Statute Law Revision (Northern Ireland) Act 1973; Statute Law Revision (Northern Ireland) Act 1980

Status: Amended

Text of statute as originally enacted

Revised text of statute as amended

The Statute Law Revision Act (Northern Ireland) 1954 (c. 35 (N.I.)) is an act of the Parliament of Northern Ireland.

This act is one of the Statute Law Revision Acts (Northern Ireland) 1952 to 1954.

== Subsequent developments ==
The schedule to the act was repealed by section 1 of, and part II of the schedule to, the Statute Law Revision (Northern Ireland) Act 1973.

The entries relating to the General Prisons (Ireland) Act in part I of the schedule to the act were repealed by section 1 of, and part VIII of the schedule to, the Statute Law Revision (Northern Ireland) Act 1980, which came into force on 13 November 1980.

== Sources ==
- "Statute Law Revision Act (Northern Ireland) 1954". The Public General Acts of 1954 : Being Acts passed in the Second and Third Years of the Reign of Her Majesty Queen Elizabeth The Second and in the First Session of the Eighth Parliament of Northern Ireland. Belfast: HMSO. 1955. pp. 340–433.
