= List of acts of the Parliament of the United Kingdom from 1935 =

This is a complete list of acts of the Parliament of the United Kingdom for the year 1935.

Note that the first parliament of the United Kingdom was held in 1801; parliaments between 1707 and 1800 were either parliaments of Great Britain or of Ireland). For acts passed up until 1707, see the list of acts of the Parliament of England and the list of acts of the Parliament of Scotland. For acts passed from 1707 to 1800, see the list of acts of the Parliament of Great Britain. See also the list of acts of the Parliament of Ireland.

For acts of the devolved parliaments and assemblies in the United Kingdom, see the list of acts of the Scottish Parliament, the list of acts of the Northern Ireland Assembly, and the list of acts and measures of Senedd Cymru; see also the list of acts of the Parliament of Northern Ireland.

The number shown after each act's title is its chapter number. Acts passed before 1963 are cited using this number, preceded by the year(s) of the reign during which the relevant parliamentary session was held; thus the Union with Ireland Act 1800 is cited as "39 & 40 Geo. 3 c. 67", meaning the 67th act passed during the session that started in the 39th year of the reign of George III and which finished in the 40th year of that reign. Note that the modern convention is to use Arabic numerals in citations (thus "41 Geo. 3" rather than "41 Geo. III"). Acts of the last session of the Parliament of Great Britain and the first session of the Parliament of the United Kingdom are both cited as "41 Geo. 3". Acts passed from 1963 onwards are simply cited by calendar year and chapter number.

== 25 & 26 Geo. 5 ==
Continuing the fourth session of the 36th Parliament of the United Kingdom, which met from 20 November 1934 until 25 October 1935.

This session was also traditionally cited as 25 & 26 G. 5.

=== Public general acts ===
Short title	Citation	Royal assent
Long title
Supreme Court of Judicature (Amendment) Act 1935 (repealed)	25 & 26 Geo. 5. c. 2	12 February 1935
An Act to amend the Supreme Court of Judicature (Consolidation) Act, 1925, (Note: Supreme Court of Judicature (Consolidation) Act 1925 (15 & 16 Geo. 5. c. 49)) by increasing to nineteen the number of puisne judges who may be appointed to be attached to the King's Bench Division of the High Court, by making provision for the appointment and precedence of a Vice-President of the Court of Appeal, by permitting certain orders of court in matrimonial proceedings to be made before decree absolute, and by providing for the hearing in camera of certain evidence in nullity proceedings; and for purposes connected with the matters aforesaid. (Repealed by Senior Courts Act 1981 (c. 54))
Electricity (Supply) Act 1935 (repealed)	25 & 26 Geo. 5. c. 3	12 February 1935
An Act to authorise the Central Electricity Board to make certain arrangements with authorised undertakers who are the owners of, or control, generating stations which are not selected stations; to authorise the Central Electricity Board to supply electricity directly to railway companies for certain purposes; to amend sections eleven and twelve of the Electricity (Supply) Act, 1926; (Note: Electricity (Supply) Act 1926 (16 & 17 Geo. 5. c. 51)) and for purposes connected with the matters aforesaid. (Repealed by Electricity Act 1947 (10 & 11 Geo. 6. c. 54))
Consolidated Fund (No. 1) Act 1935 (repealed)	25 & 26 Geo. 5. c. 4	15 February 1935
An Act to apply a sum out of the Consolidated Fund to the service of the year ending on the thirty-first day of March, one thousand nine hundred and thirty-five. (Repealed by Statute Law Revision Act 1950 (14 Geo. 6. c. 6))
Educational Endowments (Scotland) Act 1935 (repealed)	25 & 26 Geo. 5. c. 5	15 February 1935
An Act to extend by a further period of two years the period during which the powers of the Commissioners appointed under the Educational Endowments (Scotland) Act, 1928, (Note: Educational Endowments (Scotland) Act 1928 (18 & 19 Geo. 5. c. 30)) as amended by the Educational Endowments (Scotland) Act, 1931, (Note: Educational Endowments (Scotland) Act 1931 (22 & 23 Geo. 5. c. 5)) may be exercised, and to empower the Scottish Education Department to disapprove schemes submitted to them under the said Acts and to frame amended schemes, and for purposes connected therewith. (Repealed by Education (Scotland) Act 1946 (9 & 10 Geo. 6. c. 72))
Unemployment Assistance (Temporary Provisions) Act 1935 (repealed)	25 & 26 Geo. 5. c. 6	15 February 1935
An Act to make temporary provision for securing as nearly as may be that the allowances payable under Part II of the Unemployment Act, 1934, (Note: Unemployment Act 1934 (24 & 25 Geo. 5. c. 29)) to persons who but for the operation of subsection (2) of section fifty-nine of that Act would at any time since the sixth day of January nineteen hundred and thirty-five have been entitled to transitional payments, shall not be less than the transitional payments that would have been payable to them but for the operation of the said subsection; to postpone the second appointed day for the purposes of the said Act; and for purposes connected with the matters aforesaid. (Repealed by Statute Law Revision Act 1950 (14 Geo. 6. c. 6))
British Shipping (Assistance) Act 1935 (repealed)	25 & 26 Geo. 5. c. 7	26 February 1935
An Act to make provision for the granting of financial assistance to the owners of ships registered in the United Kingdom in respect of tramp voyages carried out during the year nineteen hundred and thirty-five, and to persons qualified to be owners of British ships in respect of proposals for the improvement of merchant shipping fleets; to provide for the repeal of section eighteen of the Economy (Miscellaneous Provisions) Act, 1926; (Note: Economy (Miscellaneous Provisions) Act 1926 (16 & 17 Geo. 5. c. 9)) and for purposes connected with the matters aforesaid. (Repealed by Statute Law Revision Act 1950 (14 Geo. 6. c. 6))
Unemployment Insurance Act 1935 (repealed)	25 & 26 Geo. 5. c. 8	26 February 1935
An Act to consolidate the Unemployment Insurance Acts, 1920 to 1934, and certain other enactments relating to those Acts. (Repealed by Statute Law (Repeals) Act 1978 (c. 45))
Herring Industry Act 1935 (repealed)	25 & 26 Geo. 5. c. 9	14 March 1935
An Act to provide for the establishment of a Board with power to make, in consultation with the herring industry, a scheme with respect to the reorganisation, development and regulation of the industry, for the variation or revocation of the scheme, for authorising the giving of financial assistance to, and borrowing by, the Board, and to make other provision in connection with the matters aforesaid. (Repealed by Sea Fish Industry Act 1970 (c. 11))
Consolidated Fund (No. 2) Act 1935 (repealed)	25 & 26 Geo. 5. c. 10	28 March 1935
An Act to apply certain sums out of the Consolidated Fund to the service of the years ending on the thirty-first day of March, one thousand nine hundred and thirty-five and one thousand nine hundred and thirty-six. (Repealed by Statute Law Revision Act 1950 (14 Geo. 6. c. 6))
Regimental Charitable Funds Act 1935	25 & 26 Geo. 5. c. 11	28 March 1935
An Act to make provision as to the disposition of certain regimental charitable funds.
Cattle Industry (Emergency Provisions) Act 1935 (repealed)	25 & 26 Geo. 5. c. 12	28 March 1935
An Act to provide for extending by not more than six months the period during which cattle or carcases of cattle must have been sold in order that payments in respect thereof may be made out of the Cattle Fund; for the making of further advances to the said fund out of the Consolidated Fund of the United Kingdom; and for purposes connected with the matters aforesaid. (Repealed by Statute Law Revision Act 1950 (14 Geo. 6. c. 6))
Increase of Rent and Mortgage Interest (Restrictions) Act 1935 (repealed)	25 & 26 Geo. 5. c. 13	28 March 1935
An Act to amend the interpretation of "tenant" in paragraph (g) of subsection (1) of section twelve of the Increase of Rent and Mortgage Interest (Restrictions) Act, 1920, (Note: Increase of Rent and Mortgage Interest (Restrictions) Act 1920 (10 & 11 Geo. 5. c. 17)) and the provisions of section thirteen of the Rent and Mortgage Interest Restrictions (Amendment) Act, 1933. (Note: Rent and Mortgage Interest Restrictions (Amendment) Act 1933 (23 & 24 Geo. 5. c. 32)) (Repealed for England and Wales by Rent Act 1968 (c. 23) and for Scotland by Rent (Scotland) Act 1971 (c. 28))
Post Office and Telegraph (Money) Act 1935 (repealed)	25 & 26 Geo. 5. c. 14	28 March 1935
An Act to provide for raising further money for the development of the postal, telegraphic, and telephonic systems. (Repealed by Post Office Act 1961 (9 & 10 Eliz. 2. c. 15))
Post Office (Amendment) Act 1935 (repealed)	25 & 26 Geo. 5. c. 15	28 March 1935
An Act to amend the Post Office Act, 1908, (Note: Post Office Act 1908 (8 Edw. 7. c. 48)) and other enactments relating to the Post Office. (Repealed by Post Office Act 1953 (1 & 2 Eliz. 2. c. 36))
Metropolitan Police (Borrowing Powers) Act 1935 (repealed)	25 & 26 Geo. 5. c. 16	11 April 1935
An Act to extend the powers of the Receiver for the Metropolitan Police District with respect to the borrowing of money for the provision of better accommodation required for the purposes of the Metropolitan Police Force; and to enable the Public Works Loan Commissioners to lend money for such purposes. (Repealed by Metropolitan Magistrates' Courts Act 1959 (7 & 8 Eliz. 2. c. 45))
Army and Air Force (Annual) Act 1935 (repealed)	25 & 26 Geo. 5. c. 17	11 April 1935
An Act to provide, during Twelve Months, for the Discipline and Regulation of the Army and the Air Force. (Repealed by Statute Law Revision Act 1950 (14 Geo. 6. c. 6) and Revision of the Army and Air Force Acts (Transitional Provisions) Act 1955 (3 & 4 Eliz. 2. c. 20))
National Gallery (Overseas Loans) Act 1935 (repealed)	25 & 26 Geo. 5. c. 18	11 April 1935
An Act to authorise the lending overseas of pictures comprised in the collections of the National Gallery which are by British artists. (Repealed by National Gallery and Tate Gallery Act 1954 (2 & 3 Eliz. 2. c. 65))
Land Drainage (Scotland) Act 1935 (repealed)	25 & 26 Geo. 5. c. 19	11 April 1935
An Act to extend by a further period of two years the period during which the powers of the Department of Agriculture for Scotland to prepare and settle schemes under the Land Drainage (Scotland) Act, 1930, (Note: Land Drainage (Scotland) Act 1930 (20 & 21 Geo. 5. c. 20)) may be exercised. (Repealed by Statute Law Revision Act 1950 (14 Geo. 6. c. 6))
Vagrancy Act 1935	25 & 26 Geo. 5. c. 20	6 June 1935
An Act to amend section four of the Vagrancy Act, 1824, (Note: Vagrancy Act 1824 (5 Geo. 4. c. 83)) so far as it relates to persons wandering abroad and lodging in barns or other places.
Northern Ireland Land Purchase (Winding Up) Act 1935	25 & 26 Geo. 5. c. 21	6 June 1935
An Act to make provision for the winding up of the system of land purchase in Northern Ireland established by the Land Purchase Acts and other enactments in that behalf, for the abolition of the Land Purchase Commission, Northern Ireland, and the transfer of functions exercisable under the said Acts and other enactments, and for purposes incidental to the purposes aforesaid and consequential thereon.
Unemployment Assistance (Temporary Provisions) (No. 2) Act 1935 (repealed)	25 & 26 Geo. 5. c. 22	6 June 1935
An Act to make temporary provision for the financial adjustments necessary by reason of the second appointed day for the purposes of the Unemployment Act, 1934, having been postponed from the first day of March, nineteen hundred and thirty-five; and to authorise the borrowing by public assistance authorities of sums required for the purpose of meeting expenditure incurred by them for the year ended on the thirty-first day of March, nineteen hundred and thirty-five, in excess of their estimates for that year. (Repealed by Statute Law Revision Act 1950 (14 Geo. 6. c. 6))
Superannuation Act 1935 (repealed)	25 & 26 Geo. 5. c. 23	27 June 1935
An Act to amend the law with respect to the superannuation benefits of persons who have served in the permanent Civil Service of the State; to provide for the amendment of section one of the Superannuation Act, 1887, (Note: Superannuation Act 1887 (50 & 51 Vict. c. 67)) and for the modification or revocation of the rules made under section six of that Act; and for purposes connected with the matters aforesaid. (Repealed by Statute Law (Repeals) Act 1989 (c. 43))
Finance Act 1935	25 & 26 Geo. 5. c. 24	10 July 1935
An Act to grant certain duties of Customs and Inland Revenue (including Excise), to alter other duties, and to amend the law relating to Customs and Inland Revenue (including Excise) and the National Debt, and to make further provision in connection with finance.
Counterfeit Currency (Convention) Act 1935 (repealed)	25 & 26 Geo. 5. c. 25	10 July 1935
An Act to enable effect to be given to an International Convention for the Suppression of Counterfeiting Currency, signed on behalf of His Majesty at Geneva on the twentieth day of April, nineteen hundred and twenty-nine, to apply to foreign coin certain enactments relating to British coin, and to assimilate the penalties for importing and exporting counterfeit coin. (Repealed by Statute Law (Repeals) Act 1989 (c. 43))
Defence (Barracks) Act 1935 (repealed)	25 & 26 Geo. 5. c. 26	10 July 1935
An Act to repeal the proviso to section nineteen of the Defence Act, 1842. (Note: Defence Act 1842 (5 & 6 Vict. c. 94)) (Repealed by Defence (Transfer of Functions) (No. 1) Order 1964 (SI 1964/488))
London Passenger Transport (Agreement) Act 1935 (repealed)	25 & 26 Geo. 5. c. 27	10 July 1935
An Act to authorise the Treasury to guarantee securities issued in accordance with a certain agreement made on the twentieth day of June, nineteen hundred and thirty-five, and to exempt the said agreement and certain other agreements from stamp duty. (Repealed by Statute Law Revision Act 1959 (7 & 8 Eliz. 2. c. 68))
Appropriation Act 1935 (repealed)	25 & 26 Geo. 5. c. 28	2 August 1935
An Act to apply a sum out of the Consolidated Fund to the service of the year ending on the thirty-first day of March, one thousand nine hundred and thirty-six, and to appropriate the Supplies granted in this Session of Parliament. (Repealed by Statute Law Revision Act 1950 (14 Geo. 6. c. 6))
University of Durham Act 1935 or the Durham University Act 1935 (repealed)	25 & 26 Geo. 5. c. 29	2 August 1935
An Act to make further provision with respect to the University of Durham and its constituent divisions and colleges. (Repealed by Universities of Durham and Newcastle upon Tyne Act 1963 (c. xi))
Law Reform (Married Women and Tortfeasors) Act 1935	25 & 26 Geo. 5. c. 30	2 August 1935
An Act to amend the law relating to the capacity, property, and liabilities of married women, and the liabilities of husbands; and to amend the law relating to proceedings against, and contribution between, tort-feasors.
Diseases of Animals Act 1935 (repealed)	25 & 26 Geo. 5. c. 31	2 August 1935
An Act to make provision for the application of the enactments relating to diseases of animals as respects poultry, to amend those enactments, to provide for the regulation of the manufacture, sale and importation of certain therapeutic substances capable of being used for veterinary purposes, to extend Part I of the Ministry of Agriculture and Fisheries Act, 1919, (Note: Ministry of Agriculture and Fisheries Act 1919 (9 & 10 Geo. 5. c. 91)) to Scotland; and for purposes connected with the matters aforesaid. (Repealed by Animal Health Act 1981 (c. 22))
Criminal Lunatics (Scotland) Act 1935 (repealed)	25 & 26 Geo. 5. c. 32	2 August 1935
An Act to make provision for the establishment of a criminal lunatic asylum in Scotland, and for purposes connected therewith. (Repealed by Mental Health (Scotland) Act 1960 (8 & 9 Eliz. 2. c. 61))
Unemployment Insurance (Crediting of Contributions) Act 1935 (repealed)	25 & 26 Geo. 5. c. 33	2 August 1935
An Act to provide that regulations made under section seventy-five of the Unemployment Insurance Act, 1935, (Note: Unemployment Insurance Act 1935 (25 & 26 Geo. 5. c. 8)) shall apply to persons otherwise qualified under that section who, at any time during the period of four months ending with the third day of September nineteen hundred and thirty-five, were continuing to receive whole-time education. (Repealed by National Assistance Act 1948 (11 & 12 Geo. 6. c. 29))
Isle of Man (Customs) Act 1935 (repealed)	25 & 26 Geo. 5. c. 34	2 August 1935
An Act to amend the law with respect to customs in the Isle of Man. (Repealed for the Isle of Man by Customs and Excise etc. Order 1976 (GC No 1/76))
Teachers (Superannuation) Act 1935 (repealed)	25 & 26 Geo. 5. c. 35	2 August 1935
An Act to provide that the annual allowances which, under the enactments relating to the superannuation of teachers, accrue, after the thirtieth day of June nineteen hundred and thirty-five, to persons whose service included service during the period beginning on the first day of October nineteen hundred and thirty-one and ending with the said thirtieth day of June, shall not be less than ninety-eight per cent. of the annual allowances which would have so accrued if, during that period, no reduction had been made in their salaries on account of national economic conditions. (Repealed for England and Wales by Teachers' Superannuation Act 1965 (c. 83) and for Scotland by Education (Scotland) Act 1946 (9 & 10 Geo. 6. c. 72))
Public Health (Water and Sewerage) (Scotland) Act 1935 (repealed)	25 & 26 Geo. 5. c. 36	2 August 1935
An Act to make provision for the extension of the period within which money borrowed by a local authority under the Public Health (Scotland) Act, 1897, (Note: Public Health (Scotland) Act 1897 (60 & 61 Vict. c. 38)) for the purpose of sewers or water supply requires to be repaid, and of the period for which the Public Works Loan Commissioners may lend money to local authorities for the said purposes. (Repealed by Local Government (Scotland) Act 1947 (10 & 11 Geo. 6. c. 43))
British Sugar (Subsidy) Act 1935 (repealed)	25 & 26 Geo. 5. c. 37	2 August 1935
An Act to extend by twelve months the period in respect of which subsidy in respect of sugar is payable under the British Sugar (Subsidy) Act, 1925, (Note: British Sugar (Subsidy) Act 1925 (15 & 16 Geo. 5. c. 12)) and to make further provision as to the rate of such subsidy payable under the said Act as so amended. (Repealed by Statute Law Revision Act 1950 (14 Geo. 6. c. 6))
House of Commons Disqualification (Declaration of Law) Act 1935 (repealed)	25 & 26 Geo. 5. c. 38	2 August 1935
An Act to declare that there may be two Parliamentary Under Secretaries to the Secretary of State for Foreign Affairs and that in that case neither Under Secretary is disqualified for membership of the House of Commons; and to declare the effect of section two of the Re-election of Ministers Act, 1919, (Note: Re-election of Ministers Act 1919 (9 & 10 Geo. 5. c. 2)) in relation to certain Ministers who have not the charge of any public department. (Repealed by House of Commons Disqualification Act 1957 (5 & 6 Eliz. 2. c. 20))
Cattle Industry (Emergency Provisions) (No. 2) Act 1935 (repealed)	25 & 26 Geo. 5. c. 39	2 August 1935
An Act to provide for the further extension, by not more than thirteen months, of the period during which cattle or carcases of cattle must have been sold in order that payments in respect thereof may be made out of the Cattle Fund; and for purposes connected with the matter aforesaid. (Repealed by Statute Law Revision Act 1950 (14 Geo. 6. c. 6))
Housing Act 1935 (repealed)	25 & 26 Geo. 5. c. 40	2 August 1935
An Act to make further and better provision for the abatement and prevention of overcrowding, the re-development of urban areas in connection with the provision of housing accommodation therein, and the reconditioning of buildings, to make provision for the establishment of a housing advisory committee and of commissions for the management of local authorities' houses, to amend the enactments relating to the housing operations of public utility societies and other bodies, to provide for the consolidation of housing accounts, to amend the enactments relating to housing; and for purposes connected with the matters aforesaid. (Repealed by Housing (Consequential Provisions) Act 1985 (c. 71))
Housing (Scotland) Act 1935 (repealed)	25 & 26 Geo. 5. c. 41	2 August 1935
An Act to make further and better provision for the prevention of overcrowding in Scotland, the re-development of areas in connection with the provision of housing accommodation, and the re-conditioning of buildings, to make provision for the establishment in Scotland of a housing advisory committee and of commissions for the management of local authorities' houses, to amend the enactments relating to the housing operations of public utility societies and other bodies, to provide for the consolidation of housing accounts and subsidies, and to amend the enactments relating to housing in Scotland; and for purposes connected with the matters aforesaid. (Repealed by Statute Law (Repeals) Act 1981 (c. 19))
Government of India Act 1935 (Note: Retroactively re-enacted by the Government of India (Reprinting) Act 1935 (26 Geo. 5 & 1 Edw. 8. c. 1) as the Government of India Act 1935 (26 Geo. 5 & 1 Edw. 8. c. 2) and the Government of Burma Act 1935 (26 Geo. 5 & 1 Edw. 8. c. 3).) (repealed)	25 & 26 Geo. 5. c. 42	2 August 1935
An Act to make further provision for the government of India. (Repealed by Statute Law (Repeals) Act 1976 (c. 16))
Salmon and Freshwater Fisheries Act 1935 (repealed)	25 & 26 Geo. 5. c. 43	2 August 1935
An Act to amend sections thirty-seven and thirty-eight of the Salmon and Freshwater Fisheries Act, 1923, (Note: Salmon and Freshwater Fisheries Act 1923 (13 & 14 Geo. 5. c. 16)) and for purposes incidental thereto. (Repealed by Salmon and Freshwater Fisheries Act 1975 (c. 51))
National Health Insurance and Contributory Pensions Act 1935 (repealed)	25 & 26 Geo. 5. c. 44	2 August 1935
An Act to amend the enactments relating to National Health Insurance; to amend the enactments relating to Widows', Orphans' and Old Age Contributory Pensions, with respect to the allowances or pensions payable in respect of children under full-time instruction, to the date on which pensions cease to be payable, to reciprocal arrangements with other parts of His Majesty' dominions, to the incidence of the increase of contributions during the decennial period commencing the first day of January, nineteen hundred and thirty-six, and subsequent decennial periods, and to the payment of pensions in respect of the insurance of persons ceasing to be insured within twelve months before death or before attaining the age of sixty-five; and for purposes connected therewith. (Repealed for England and Wales and Scotland by National Health Insurance Act 1936 (26 Geo. 5 & 1 Edw. 8. c. 32) and Widows', Orphans' and Old Age Contributory Pensions Act 1936 (26 Geo. 5 & 1 Edw. 8. c. 33) and for Northern Ireland by Statute Law Revision Act (Northern Ireland) 1952 (c. 1 (N.I.)))
Assurance Companies (Winding up) Act 1935 (repealed)	25 & 26 Geo. 5. c. 45	2 August 1935
An Act to amend the Assurance Companies (Winding up) Act, 1933. (Note: Assurance Companies (Winding up) Act 1933 (23 & 24 Geo. 5. c. 9)) (Repealed by Insurance Companies Act 1958 (6 & 7 Eliz. 2. c. 72))
Money Payments (Justices Procedure) Act 1935 (repealed)	25 & 26 Geo. 5. c. 46	2 August 1935
An Act to amend the law with respect to the enforcement by justices of the peace of the payment of money due by virtue of convictions of courts of summary jurisdiction or of orders in matters of bastardy or enforceable as affiliation orders, or due in respect of rates; and to make provision with respect to the mode of proof in certain proceedings before justices of the payment of wages. (Repealed by Statute Law (Repeals) Act 1971 (c. 52))
Restriction of Ribbon Development Act 1935 (repealed)	25 & 26 Geo. 5. c. 47	2 August 1935
An Act to provide for the imposition of restrictions upon development along the frontages of roads; to enable highway authorities to acquire land for the construction or improvement of roads or for preserving amenities or controlling development in the neighbourhood of roads; to extend the powers of local authorities as to the provision of accommodation for the parking of vehicles and as to the prevention of interference with traffic; and for purposes connected with the matters aforesaid. (Repealed by Statute Law (Repeals) Act 1989 (c. 43))

=== Local acts ===
Short title	Citation	Royal assent
Long title
Edinburgh Corporation (Tramways, &c.) Order Confirmation Act 1935 (repealed)	25 & 26 Geo. 5. c. iii	15 February 1935
An Act to confirm a Provisional Order under the Private Legislation Procedure (Scotland) Acts 1899 (Note: Private Legislation Procedure (Scotland) Act 1899 (62 & 63 Vict. c. 47)) and 1933 (Note: Private Legislation Procedure (Scotland) Act 1933 (23 & 24 Geo. 5. c. 37)) relating to Edinburgh Corporation (Tramways &c.). (Repealed by Edinburgh Corporation Order Confirmation Act 1962 (11 & 12 Eliz. 2. c. ii))
	Edinburgh Corporation (Tramways, &c.) Order 1935	
Ministry of Health Provisional Order Confirmation (Leicester and Warwick) Act 1935 (repealed)	25 & 26 Geo. 5. c. iv	14 March 1935
An Act to confirm a Provisional Order of the Minister of Health relating to the Counties of Leicester and Warwick. (Repealed by Statute Law (Repeals) Act 1995 (c. 44))
	Leicester and Warwick Order 1935	
Ministry of Health Provisional Order Confirmation (Cumberland and Lancaster) Act 1935	25 & 26 Geo. 5. c. v	14 March 1935
An Act to confirm a Provisional Order of the Minister of Health relating to the County of Cumberland and the County Palatine of Lancaster.
	Cumberland and Lancaster Order 1935	
Ministry of Health Provisional Order Confirmation (Gloucester and Warwick) Act 1935 (repealed)	25 & 26 Geo. 5. c. vi	14 March 1935
An Act to confirm a Provisional Order of the Minister of Health relating to the Counties of Gloucester and Warwick. (Repealed by Statute Law (Repeals) Act 1995 (c. 44))
	Gloucester and Warwick Order 1935	
Ministry of Health Provisional Order Confirmation (Holland and Kesteven) Act 1935	25 & 26 Geo. 5. c. vii	14 March 1935
An Act to confirm a Provisional Order of the Minister of Health relating to the Counties of the Parts of Holland and the Parts of Kesteven.
	Holland and Kesteven Order 1935	
Ministry of Health Provisional Order Confirmation (Holland and Lindsey) Act 1935	25 & 26 Geo. 5. c. viii	14 March 1935
An Act to confirm a Provisional Order of the Minister of Health relating to the Counties of the Parts of Holland and the Parts of Lindsey.
	Holland and Lindsey Order 1935	
Ministry of Health Provisional Order Confirmation (County of Holland Joint Hospital District) Act 1935	25 & 26 Geo. 5. c. ix	28 March 1935
An Act to confirm a Provisional Order of the Minister of Health relating to the County of Holland Joint Hospital District.
	County of Holland Joint Hospital Order 1935	
Ministry of Health Provisional Order Confirmation (Guisborough Joint Small-pox Hospital District) Act 1935 (repealed)	25 & 26 Geo. 5. c. x	28 March 1935
An Act to confirm a Provisional Order of the Minister of Health relating to the Guisborough Joint Small-pox Hospital District. (Repealed by County of Cleveland Act 1987 (c. ix))
	Guisborough Joint Small-pox Hospital Order 1935	
Ministry of Health Provisional Order Confirmation (Huntingdonshire Joint Hospital District) Act 1935	25 & 26 Geo. 5. c. xi	28 March 1935
An Act to confirm a Provisional Order of the Minister of Health relating to the Huntingdonshire Joint Hospital District.
	Huntingdonshire Joint Hospital Order 1935	
Ministry of Health Provisional Order Confirmation (South Chilterns Joint Small-pox Hospital District) Act 1935	25 & 26 Geo. 5. c. xii	28 March 1935
An Act to confirm a Provisional Order of the Minister of Health relating to the South Chilterns Joint Small-pox Hospital District.
	South Chilterns Joint Small-pox Hospital Order 1935	
Clacton-on-Sea Pier Act 1935	25 & 26 Geo. 5. c. xiii	28 March 1935
An Act to authorise the widening of the existing pier in and adjoining the Urban District of Clacton, in the County of Essex, and for other purposes.
Coventry Canal Navigation Act 1935	25 & 26 Geo. 5. c. xiv	28 March 1935
An Act to make further provision with respect to the tolls and charges applicable to the Coventry Canal Navigation.
Oxford Canal Act 1935	25 & 26 Geo. 5. c. xv	28 March 1935
An Act to convert into stock the share capital of the Company of Proprietors of the Oxford Canal Navigation; to change the name of the Company, and for other purposes.
Rochdale Canal Act 1935	25 & 26 Geo. 5. c. xvi	28 March 1935
An Act to make further provision as to the tolls and charges leviable by the Rochdale Canal Company, and for other purposes.
Weaver Navigation Act 1935	25 & 26 Geo. 5. c. xvii	28 March 1935
An Act to make further provision with respect to rates, tolls, and charges leviable by the Weaver Navigation Trustees.
Sea Fisheries (Paglesham) Order Confirmation Act 1935	25 & 26 Geo. 5. c. xviii	11 April 1935
An Act to confirm a Provisional Order made by the Minister of Agriculture and Fisheries under the Sea Fisheries Act, 1868, (Note: Sea Fisheries Act 1868 (31 & 32 Vict. c. 45)) for the establishment and maintenance of a several Oyster Fishery at Paglesham in the River Roach, in the County of Essex.
	Paglesham Fisheries Order 1935	
Chester Waterworks Act 1935	25 & 26 Geo. 5. c. xix	11 April 1935
An Act to extend the period for the completion of certain works by the Chester Waterworks Company, and for other purposes.
Great Western Railway Act 1935	25 & 26 Geo. 5. c. xx	11 April 1935
An Act for conferring further powers upon the Great Western Railway Company, and for other purposes.
Saltburn and Marske-by-Sea Urban District Council Act 1935 (repealed)	25 & 26 Geo. 5. c. xxi	11 April 1935
An Act to enlarge the powers of the Urban District Council of Saltburn and Marske-by-the-Sea with respect to the pleasure gardens; to make further provision for the improvement, good government and finance of their district, and for other purposes. (Repealed by County of Cleveland Act 1987 (c. ix))
Folkestone and District Electricity Act 1935	25 & 26 Geo. 5. c. xxii	6 June 1935
An Act to make better provision with respect to the rights of the Folkestone Corporation to purchase the undertakings of the Folkestone Electricity Supply Company, Limited, within the Borough of Folkestone and the Rural District of Elham, and for other purposes.
Medway Lower Navigation Act 1935	25 & 26 Geo. 5. c. xxiii	6 June 1935
An Act to amend the Acts relating to the Company of Proprietors of the Lower Navigation of the Rive Medway; to change their name, and for other purposes
Marlow Water Act 1935	25 & 26 Geo. 5. c. xxiv	6 June 1935
An Act to incorporate and confer powers on the Marlow Water Company, and for other purposes.
Norwich Electric Tramways Act 1935	25 & 26 Geo. 5. c. xxv	6 June 1935
An Act to provide for the abandonment of the tramways of the Norwich Electric Tramways Company; to extend the Company's powers of running public service vehicles; to change their name, and for other purposes.
Sharpness Docks and Gloucester and Birmingham Navigation Act 1935	25 & 26 Geo. 5. c. xxvi	6 June 1935
An Act to confer further powers on and to change the name of the Sharpness New Docks and Gloucester and Birmingham Navigation Company, and for other purposes.
Sheffield and South Yorkshire Navigation Act 1935	25 & 26 Geo. 5. c. xxvii	6 June 1935
An Act to confer further powers on the Sheffield and South Yorkshire Navigation Company, and for other purposes.
Newcastle-upon-Tyne Corporation (Quay Extension) Act 1935	25 & 26 Geo. 5. c. xxviii	6 June 1935
An Act to empower the Lord Mayor, Aldermen, and Citizens of the City and County of Newcastle-upon-Tyne to extend their existing quays, and for other purposes.
Golders Green (Jewish) Burial Ground Act 1935	25 & 26 Geo. 5. c. xxix	6 June 1935
An Act to authorise the removal from a portion of the Golders Green (Jewish) Burial Ground, in the Borough of Hendon, of the restrictions attaching thereto so as to authorise its use for building or otherwise, and for other purposes.
Newcastle and Gateshead Waterworks Act 1935	25 & 26 Geo. 5. c. xxx	6 June 1935
An Act to confer upon the Newcastle and Gateshead Water Company further capital borrowing powers; to provide for the consolidation of preference stocks and debenture stocks of the Company, and for other purposes.
Glamorganshire Canal Company Act 1935	25 & 26 Geo. 5. c. xxxi	6 June 1935
An Act to make further provision as to the rates, tolls, dues, and charges leviable by the Company of Proprietors of the Glamorganshire Canal Navigation, and for other purposes.
Irwell Valley Water Board Act 1935	25 & 26 Geo. 5. c. xxxii	6 June 1935
An Act to change the name of the Bury and District Joint Water Board, and for other purposes.
London County Council (General Powers) Act 1935	25 & 26 Geo. 5. c. xxxiii	6 June 1935
An Act to confer further powers upon the London County Council and other authorities, and for other purposes.
Mid-Wessex Water Act 1935	25 & 26 Geo. 5. c. xxxiv	6 June 1935
An Act to change the name of the Frimley and Farnborough District Water Company; to provide for the transfer to that company of the undertaking authorised by the Bradfield Water Orders, 1904 to 1924, and of the water undertaking in the Parish of Stratfield Mortimer of the Bradfield Rural District Council; to extend the Frimley and Farnborough District Water Company's limits for the supply of water; to authorise that company to construct further works and to confer upon them further powers, and for other purposes.
Glasgow Corporation Order Confirmation Act 1935	25 & 26 Geo. 5. c. xxxv	6 June 1935
An Act to empower the Corporation of the City of Glasgow to establish a municipal savings bank; to alter the period during which the Lord Provost of the city shall hold office; to provide that the Dean of Guild and the Deacon Convener shall cease to be members of the Corporation; to authorise the Corporation to manufacture omnibus bodies; to enable the Corporation to take possession of and to sell abandoned properties; to make bye-laws as to street trading, and for other purposes.
	Glasgow Corporation Order 1935	
Renfrewshire County Council (Lochwinnoch, &c.) Water Order Confirmation Act 1935	25 & 26 Geo. 5. c. xxxvi	6 June 1935
An Act to confirm a Provisional Order under the Private Legislation Procedure (Scotland) Acts 1899 and 1933 relating to Renfrewshire County Council (Lockwinnoch, &c.) Water.
	Renfrewshire County Council (Lockwinnoch, &c.) Water Order 1935	
Stirlingshire and Falkirk Water Order Confirmation Act 1935	25 & 26 Geo. 5. c. xxxvii	6 June 1935
An Act to confirm a Provisional Order under the Private Legislation Procedure (Scotland) Acts 1899 and 1933 relating to Stirlingshire and Falkirk Water.
	Stirlingshire and Falkirk Water Order 1935	
Ross and Cromarty (Dornie Bridge) Order Confirmation Act 1935	25 & 26 Geo. 5. c. xxxviii	6 June 1935
An Act to confirm a Provisional Order under the Private Legislation Procedure (Scotland) Acts 1899 and 1933 relating to Ross and Cromarty (Dornie Bridge).
	Ross and Cromarty (Dornie Bridge) Order 1935	
Bristol Tramways Act 1935	25 & 26 Geo. 5. c. xxxix	27 June 1935
An Act to make further provision as to the fares chargeable by the Bristol Tramways and Carriage Company, Limited, in respect of their tramways and light railways, and for other purposes.
Baildon Urban District Council Act 1935	25 & 26 Geo. 5. c. xl	27 June 1935
An Act to empower the urban district council of Baildon to construct additional waterworks; to make further and better provision for the improvement, health, and local government of the district, and for other purposes.
Glasgow Corporation Sewage Order Confirmation Act 1935	25 & 26 Geo. 5. c. xli	10 July 1935
An Act to confirm a Provisional Order under the Private Legislation Procedure (Scotland) Acts 1899 and 1933 relating to Glasgow Corporation Sewage.
	Glasgow Corporation Sewage Order 1935 Provisional Order to consolidate with amendments the Glasgow Sewage Acts 1891 to 1930 to empower the corporation of the city of Glasgow to acquire additional lands and to construct additional sewers and other works for sewage purposes to vest in the Corporation the sewage purification works at Westthorn in the city to make provision with respect to the interception and treatment of the sewage of the city the burghs of Rutherglen and Clydebank and portions of the counties of Dunbarton Lanark and Renfrew to authorise the borrowing of moneys and the levying of assessments and for other purposes.	
Lanarkshire County Council Order Confirmation Act 1935	25 & 26 Geo. 5. c. xlii	10 July 1935
An Act to confirm a Provisional Order under the Private Legislation Procedure (Scotland) Acts 1899 and 1933 relating to Lanarkshire County Council.
	Lanarkshire County Council Order 1935	
London, Midland and Scottish Railway Order Confirmation Act 1935	25 & 26 Geo. 5. c. xliii	10 July 1935
An Act to confirm a Provisional Order under the Private Legislation Procedure (Scotland) Acts 1899 and 1933 relating to the London Midland and Scottish Railway.
	London, Midland and Scottish Railway Order 1935 Provisional Order to extend the time for the completion of certain authorised railways and works and for the purchase of lands by the London Midland and Scottish Railway Company and to make provision as to canal charges and for other purposes.	
Sheffield Corporation Tramways Order Confirmation Act 1935 (repealed)	25 & 26 Geo. 5. c. xliv	10 July 1935
An Act to confirm a Provisional Order made by the Minister of Transport under the Tramways Act 1870 (Note: Tramways Act 1870 (33 & 34 Vict. c. 78)) relating to Sheffield Corporation Tramways. (Repealed by Statute Law (Repeals) Act 1989 (c. 43))
	Sheffield Corporation Tramways Order 1935 Order authorising the lord mayor aldermen and citizens of the city of Sheffield to construct additional tramways in the said city and for other purposes.	
Portsmouth Corporation (Trolley Vehicles) Order Confirmation Act 1935	25 & 26 Geo. 5. c. xlv	10 July 1935
An Act to confirm a Provisional Order made by the Minister of Transport under the Portsmouth Corporation Act 1930 (Note: Portsmouth Corporation Act 1930 (20 & 21 Geo. 5. c. lii)) relating to Portsmouth Corporation trolley vehicles.
	Portsmouth Corporation (Trolley Vehicles) Order 1935 Order authorising the lord mayor aldermen and citizens of the city of Portsmouth to use trolley vehicles upon certain routes in the city of Portsmouth.	
Ministry of Health Provisional Order Confirmation (Guildford) Act 1935	25 & 26 Geo. 5. c. xlvi	10 July 1935
An Act to confirm a Provisional Order of the Minister of Health relating to the borough of Guildford.
	Guildford Order 1935 Provisional Order for altering a Local Act. (Note: Guildford Corporation Act 1886 (49 & 50 Vict. c. cvii))	
London and North Eastern Railway Act 1935	25 & 26 Geo. 5. c. xlvii	10 July 1935
An Act to make provision as to the tolls and charges leviable by the London and North Eastern Railway Company on their canals to extend the time for the completion of certain works and for other purposes.
South Essex Waterworks Act 1935	25 & 26 Geo. 5. c. xlviii	10 July 1935
An Act to authorise the South Essex Waterworks Company to construct new works and to raise additional capital and for other purposes.
Southern Railway Act 1935	25 & 26 Geo. 5. c. xlix	10 July 1935
An Act to empower the Southern Railway Company to construct works and acquire lands to extend the time for the completion of certain works and the compulsory purchase of certain lands and for other purposes.
Rhyl Urban District Council Act 1935	25 & 26 Geo. 5. c. l	10 July 1935
An Act to confer further powers upon the Urban District Council of Rhyl with regard to their water and electricity undertakings; to make further and better provision for the improvement, health, and local government and finance of the district, and for other purposes.
West Hampshire Water Act 1935	25 & 26 Geo. 5. c. li	10 July 1935
An Act to extend the limits of supply of the West Hampshire Water Company to confirm the construction of an existing service reservoir to authorise the Company to raise additional money to confer further powers upon the Company and for other purposes.
City of London (St. Paul's Cathedral Preservation) Act 1935	25 & 26 Geo. 5. c. lii	10 July 1935
An Act to confer powers with respect to the preservation of St. Paul's Cathedral, and for other purposes.
Ayr County Council (General Powers) Order Confirmation Act 1935	25 & 26 Geo. 5. c. liii	2 August 1935
An Act to confirm a Provisional Order under the Private Legislation Procedure (Scotland) Acts 1899 and 1933 relating to Ayr County Council.
	Ayr County Council (General Powers) Order 1935 Provisional Order to provide for the control of camping grounds in the county of Ayr to confer powers upon the county council of the county relating to finance the control of street works and other matters to make provision for supplementary valuation rolls and for other purposes.	
Leith Harbour and Docks Consolidation Order Confirmation Act 1935 (repealed)	25 & 26 Geo. 5. c. liv	2 August 1935
An Act to confirm a Provisional Order under the Private Legislation Procedure (Scotland) Acts 1899 and 1933 relating to Leith Harbour and Docks. (Repealed by Statute Law (Repeals) Act 1986 (c. 12))
	Leith Harbour and Docks Consolidation Order Order 1935 Provisional Order to consolidate with amendments the Acts and Orders of or relating to The Commissioners for the Harbour and Docks of Leith and for other purposes.	
Ayr Burgh Extension, &c. Order Confirmation Act 1935	25 & 26 Geo. 5. c. lv	2 August 1935
An Act to confirm a Provisional Order under the Private Legislation Procedure (Scotland) Acts 1899 and 1933 relating to Ayr Burgh Extension &c.
	Ayr Burgh Extension, &c. Order 1935 Provisional Order to extend the boundaries of the burgh of Ayr to empower the provost magistrates and councillors of the burgh to acquire lands to execute street improvements and to construct a dam or weir across the river Ayr to confer further powers upon them with regard to their water undertaking to authorise them to borrow money to make provision with respect to the local government health and finance of the burgh and for other purposes.	
Kilmarnock Burgh Extension, &c. Order Confirmation Act 1935	25 & 26 Geo. 5. c. lvi	2 August 1935
An Act to confirm a Provisional Order under the Private Legislation Procedure (Scotland) Acts 1899 and 1933 relating to Kilmarnock Burgh Extension &c.
	Kilmarnock Burgh Extension, &c. Order 1935	
Troon Burgh Extension, &c. Order Confirmation Act 1935	25 & 26 Geo. 5. c. lvii	2 August 1935
An Act to confirm a Provisional Order under the Private Legislation Procedure (Scotland) Acts 1899 and 1933 relating to Troon Burgh Extension, &c.
	Troon Burgh Extension, &c. Order 1935	
Metropolitan Common Scheme (Palewell) Confirmation Act 1935	25 & 26 Geo. 5. c. lviii	2 August 1935
An Act to confirm a Scheme under the Metropolitan Commons Acts 1866 to 1898 with respect to Palewell Common in the county of Surrey.
	Scheme with respect to Palewell Common.	
Ipswich Corporation (Trolley Vehicles) Order Confirmation Act 1935	25 & 26 Geo. 5. c. lix	2 August 1935
An Act to confirm a Provisional Order made by the Minister of Transport under the Ipswich Corporation Act 1925 (Note: Ipswich Corporation Act 1925 (15 & 16 Geo. 5. c. ciii)) relating to Ipswich Corporation trolley vehicles.
	Ipswich Corporation (Trolley Vehicles) Order 1935 Order authorising the mayor aldermen and burgesses of the borough of Ipswich to provide maintain and use trolley vehicles upon certain routes in that borough and in the parish of Rushmere St. Andrew.	
Provisional Orders (Marriages) Confirmation Act 1935 (repealed)	25 & 26 Geo. 5. c. lx	2 August 1935
An Act to confirm certain Provisional Orders made by one of His Majesty's Principal Secretaries of State under the Marriages Validity (Provisional Orders) Acts 1905 (Note: Provisional Order (Marriages) Act 1905 (5 Edw. 7. c. 23)) and 1924. (Note: Marriages Validity (Provisional Orders) Act 1924 (14 & 15 Geo. 5. c. 20)) (Repealed by Statute Law (Repeals) Act 1977 (c. 18))
	Saint Alban Lakenham Order.	
	Saint Mary Linslade Order.	
	Saint Ignatius Ossett Order.	
	Holy Trinity Forest Green Okewood Order.	
Pier and Harbour Order (Scarborough) Confirmation Act 1935	25 & 26 Geo. 5. c. lxi	2 August 1935
An Act to confirm a Provisional Order made by the Minister of Transport under the General Pier and Harbour Act 1861 (Note: General Pier and Harbour Act 1861 (24 & 25 Vict. c. 45)) relating to Scarborough.
	Scarborough Harbour Order 1935 Order for the reconstitution of the Scarborough Harbour Commissioners and for making further provision with regard to the finances of the said Commissioners and for other purposes.	
Ministry of Health Provisional Order Confirmation (Leigh Joint Hospital District) Act 1935	25 & 26 Geo. 5. c. lxii	2 August 1935
An Act to confirm a Provisional Order of the Minister of Health relating to the Leigh Joint Hospital District.
	Leigh Joint Hospital Order 1935 Provisional order altering the Leigh Joint Hospital Order 1894.	
Ministry of Health Provisional Order Confirmation (Eastbourne) Act 1935 (repealed)	25 & 26 Geo. 5. c. lxiii	2 August 1935
An Act to confirm a Provisional Order of the Minister of Health relating to the borough of Eastbourne. (Repealed by East Sussex Act 1981 (c. xxv))
	Eastbourne Order 1935 Provisional order amending the Eastbourne Corporation Act 1926. (Note: Eastbourne Corporation Act 1926 (16 & 17 Geo. 5. c. xcv))	
Ministry of Health Provisional Order Confirmation (Croydon) Act 1935	25 & 26 Geo. 5. c. lxiv	2 August 1935
An Act to confirm a Provisional Order of the Minister of Health relating to the borough of Croydon.
	Croydon Order 1935 Provisional order altering a local Act. (Note: Croydon Corporation Act 1930 (20 & 21 Geo. 5. c. lxxxvii))	
Ministry of Health Provisional Order Confirmation (Metropolis Water) Act 1935	25 & 26 Geo. 5. c. lxv	2 August 1935
An Act to confirm a Provisional Order of the Minister of Health relating to the urban districts of Chigwell Chingford Waltham Holy Cross and Wanstead and Woodford.
	Metropolis Water Order 1935 Provisional order altering the Metropolis Water Act 1902. (Note: Metropolis Water Act 1902 (2 Edw. 7. c. 41))	
Ministry of Health Provisional Order Confirmation (Morley) Act 1935 (repealed)	25 & 26 Geo. 5. c. lxvi	2 August 1935
An Act to confirm a Provisional Order of the Minister of Health relating to the borough of Morley. (Repealed by West Yorkshire Act 1980 (c. xiv))
	Morley Order 1935 Provisional order altering the Morley Corporation Act 1923. (Note: Morley Corporation Act 1923 (13 & 14 Geo. 5. c. cv))	
Ministry of Health Provisional Order Confirmation (Huntington) Act 1935	25 & 26 Geo. 5. c. lxvii	2 August 1935
An Act to confirm a Provisional Order of the Minister of Health relating to the county of Huntingdon.
	County of Huntington Order 1935 Provisional order to enable the county council of Huntingdon to put in force the compulsory clauses of the Lands Clauses Acts.	
Ministry of Health Provisional Order Confirmation (Harrogate) Act 1935	25 & 26 Geo. 5. c. lxviii	2 August 1935
An Act to confirm a Provisional Order of the Minister of Health relating to the borough of Harrogate.
	Harrogate Order 1935 Provisional order altering certain local Acts.	
Ministry of Health Provisional Order Confirmation (Cuddington Joint Hospital District) Act 1935	25 & 26 Geo. 5. c. lxix	2 August 1935
An Act to confirm a Provisional Order of the Minister of Health relating to the Cuddington Joint Hospital District.
	Cuddington Joint Hospital District Order 1935 Provisional order altering the Banstead Sutton Carshalton and Leatherhead Joint Hospital Orders 1893 to 1932.	
Ministry of Health Provisional Order Confirmation (East Surrey Water) Act 1935	25 & 26 Geo. 5. c. lxx	2 August 1935
An Act to confirm a Provisional Order of the Minister of Health relating to the East Surrey Water Company.
	East Surrey Water Order 1935 Provisional order under the Gas and Water Works Facilities Act 1870 (Note: Gas and Water Works Facilities Act 1870 (33 & 34 Vict. c. 70)) and the Gas and Water Works Facilities Act 1870 Amendment Act 1873 (Note: Gas and Water Works Facilities Act 1870 Amendment Act 1873 (36 & 37 Vict. c. 89)) empowering the East Surrey Water Company to raise additional capital and to acquire further lands and for other purposes.	
Ministry of Health Provisional Order Confirmation (Harpenden Water) Act 1935	25 & 26 Geo. 5. c. lxxi	2 August 1935
An Act to confirm a Provisional Order of the Minister of Health relating to the Harpenden Water Company Limited.
	Harpenden Water Order 1935 Provisional order under the Gas and Water Works Facilities Act 1870 and the Gas and Water Works Facilities Act 1870 Amendment Act 1873 empowering the Harpenden Water Company Limited to raise additional capital and for other purposes.	
Ministry of Health Provisional Order Confirmation (Monks and Princes Risborough Water) Act 1935	25 & 26 Geo. 5. c. lxxii	2 August 1935
An Act to confirm a Provisional Order of the Minister of Health relating to Monks and Princes Risborough Water.
	Monks and Princes Risborough Water Order 1935 Provisional order under the Gas and Water Works Facilities Act 1870 and the Gas and Water Works Facilities Act 1870 Amendment Act 1873 extending the limits of supply of the Rural Districts Water Company Limited empowering them to construct and maintain additional waterworks to raise additional capital and for other purposes.	
Ministry of Health Provisional Order Confirmation (Rainham Water) Act 1935	25 & 26 Geo. 5. c. lxxiii	2 August 1935
An Act to confirm a Provisional Order of the Minister of Health relating to the Rainham Waterworks Company Limited.
	Rainham Water Order 1935 Provisional order under the Gas and Water Works Facilities Act 1870 and the Gas and Water Works Facilities Act 1870 Amendment Act 1873 for empowering the Rainham Waterworks Company Limited to construct additional waterworks to extend their limits of supply to raise additional capital and for other purposes.	
Ministry of Health Provisional Order Confirmation (South Oxfordshire Water) Act 1935 (repealed)	25 & 26 Geo. 5. c. lxxiv	2 August 1935
An Act to confirm a Provisional Order of the Minister of Health relating to the South Oxfordshire Water and Gas Company. (Repealed by Reading and Berkshire Water, &c. Act 1959 (7 & 8 Eliz. 2. c. xxxiii))
	South Oxfordshire Water Order 1935 Provisional order under the Gas and Water Works Facilities Act 1870 and the Gas and Water Works Facilities Act 1870 Amendment Act 1873 empowering the South Oxfordshire Water and Gas Company to maintain and continue existing waterworks to extend the limits of supply of the Company and for other purposes.	
Ministry of Health Provisional Order Confirmation (Oxford) Act 1935 (repealed)	25 & 26 Geo. 5. c. lxxv	2 August 1935
An Act to confirm a Provisional Order of the Minister of Health relating to the City of Oxford. (Repealed by Oxfordshire and District Water Board Order 1966 (SI 1966/1163))
	Oxford Order 1935 Provisional order amending the Oxford (Water) Order 1932.	
Ministry of Health Provisional Order Confirmation (Norwich) Act 1935 (repealed)	25 & 26 Geo. 5. c. lxxvi	2 August 1935
An Act to confirm a Provisional Order of the Minister of Health relating to the City of Norwich. (Repealed by Norwich City Council Act 1984 (c. xxiii))
	Norwich Order 1935 Provisional order amending certain local Acts.	
Ministry of Health Provisional Order Confirmation (Pwllheli) Act 1935	25 & 26 Geo. 5. c. lxxvii	2 August 1935
An Act to confirm a Provisional Order of the Minister of Health relating to the borough of Pwllheli.
	Pwllheli Water Order 1935 Provisional order amending the Pwllheli Corporation Act 1897. (Note: Pwllheli Corporation Act 1897 (60 & 61 Vict. c. ccv))	
Ministry of Health Provisional Order Confirmation (Fylde, Preston and Garstang Joint Smallpox Hospital District) Act 1935	25 & 26 Geo. 5. c. lxxviii	2 August 1935
An Act to confirm a Provisional Order of the Minister of Health relating to the Fylde Preston and Garstang Joint Smallpox Hospital District.
	Fylde, Preston and Garstang Joint Smallpox Hospital Order 1935 Provisional order altering certain Confirming Acts.	
Ministry of Health Provisional Order Confirmation (Ottershaw Joint Hospital District) Act 1935	25 & 26 Geo. 5. c. lxxix	2 August 1935
An Act to confirm a Provisional Order of the Minister of Health relating to the Ottershaw Joint Hospital District.
	Ottershaw Joint Hospital Order 1935 Provisional order forming a united district under section 279 of the Public Health Act 1875. (Note: Public Health Act 1875 (38 & 39 Vict. c. 55))	
Ministry of Health Provisional Order Confirmation (Watford) Act 1935	25 & 26 Geo. 5. c. lxxx	2 August 1935
An Act to confirm a Provisional Order of the Minister of Health relating to the borough of Watford.
	Watford Order 1935 Provisional order amending the Watford Urban District Council Act 1909 (Note: Watford Urban District Council Act 1909 (9 Edw. 7. c. lxxxviii)) and certain orders.	
Bognor Gas and Electricity Act 1935	25 & 26 Geo. 5. c. lxxxi	2 August 1935
An Act to consolidate with amendments the provisions of the Bognor Gas and Electricity Acts and Orders 1908 to 1927 relating to the capital and borrowing powers of the Bognor Gas and Electricity Company to authorise the Company to raise additional money to confer further powers upon the Company and for other purposes.
West Riding of Yorkshire Mental Hospital Board (Superannuation) Act 1935	25 & 26 Geo. 5. c. lxxxii	2 August 1935
An Act to make provision with respect to the payment of superannuation allowances to certain officers and servants of the West Riding of Yorkshire Mental Hospitals Board and for other purposes.
Bournemouth Gas and Water Act 1935	25 & 26 Geo. 5. c. lxxxiii	2 August 1935
An Act to provide for the transfer to the Bournemouth Gas and Water Company of the undertaking of the Wimborne Minster Gas Company Limited to extend the limits for the supply of gas by the Bournemouth Gas and Water Company and for other purposes.
Metropolitan Water Board Act 1935	25 & 26 Geo. 5. c. lxxxiv	2 August 1935
An Act to empower the Metropolitan Water Board to execute works and to acquire lands, and for other purposes.
South Suburban Gas Act 1935	25 & 26 Geo. 5. c. lxxxv	2 August 1935
An Act to confer further powers upon the South Suburban Gas Company and for other purposes.
Swansea Tramways Act 1935 (repealed)	25 & 26 Geo. 5. c. lxxxvi	2 August 1935
An Act to make further provision as to the fares chargeable in respect of certain tramways and light railways in the county borough of Swansea. (Repealed by Swansea and District Transport Act 1936 (26 Geo. 5 & 1 Edw. 8. c. xxxix))
Gloucester Corporation Act 1935	25 & 26 Geo. 5. c. lxxxvii	2 August 1935
An Act to extend the limits for the supply of water by the Mayor, Aldermen, and Citizens of the City of Gloucester, in the County of the City of Gloucester; and to make further provision with regard to the several undertakings of the Corporation and to the improvement, health, local government, and finance of the city, and for other purposes.
Urmston Urban District Council Act 1935	25 & 26 Geo. 5. c. lxxxviii	2 August 1935
An Act to confer further powers on the urban district council of Urmston for and in connection with the improvement health good government and finances of their district and for other purposes.
Maidstone Corporation Act 1935 (repealed)	25 & 26 Geo. 5. c. lxxxix	2 August 1935
An Act to make further provision with regard to the electricity undertaking of the Mayor, Aldermen, and Burgesses of the Borough of Maidstone; and with regard to the health, local government, and improvement of that borough; to make further provision with regard to the finances of the said Mayor, Aldermen, and Burgesses, and for other purposes. (Repealed by County of Kent Act 1981 (c. xviii))
Reading Corporation Act 1935	25 & 26 Geo. 5. c. xc	2 August 1935
An Act to confer further powers upon the mayor aldermen and burgesses of the borough of Reading with regard to the provision and working of trolley vehicles and in connection with their electricity undertaking and for other purposes.
Fylde Water Board Act 1935	25 & 26 Geo. 5. c. xci	2 August 1935
An Act to empower the Fylde Water Board to construct further aqueducts and other waterworks to extend the limits of the Board for the supply of water to provide for the purchase by the Board of the church and vicarage at Dalehead in the west riding of Yorkshire to authorise the Board to borrow money for the construction of the said works and others and for other purposes.
London Building Act (Amendment) Act 1935	25 & 26 Geo. 5. c. xcii	2 August 1935
An Act to amend the London Building Act 1930. (Note: London Building Act 1930 (20 & 21 Geo. 5. c. clviii))
Chichester Corporation Act 1935	25 & 26 Geo. 5. c. xciii	2 August 1935
An Act to empower the mayor aldermen and citizens of the city of Chichester to construct additional waterworks to extend their limits of water supply to confer further powers upon them with respect to their water and electricity undertakings and for other purposes.
Stourbridge Navigation Act 1935	25 & 26 Geo. 5. c. xciv	2 August 1935
An Act to make further provision as to the tolls and charges leviable by the Company of Proprietors of the Stourbridge Navigation to authorise the transfer to the Company of part of the Stourbridge Extension Canal and for other purposes.
Milford Docks Act 1935 (repealed)	25 & 26 Geo. 5. c. xcv	2 August 1935
An Act to confer powers on the Milford Docks Company and for other purposes. (Repealed by Milford Docks Act 1953 (1 & 2 Eliz. 2. c. x))
South Shields Corporation Act 1935	25 & 26 Geo. 5. c. xcvi	2 August 1935
An Act to confer powers upon the Mayor, Aldermen, and Burgesses of the Borough of South Shields of running trolley vehicles; to make various provisions and to confer various powers with respect to the several undertakings of the Corporation; to make further provision for the health, local government, improvement, and finance of the borough, and for other purposes.
Beckenham Urban District Council Act 1935	25 & 26 Geo. 5. c. xcvii	2 August 1935
An Act to confer further powers on the urban district council of Beckenham in regard to their electricity undertaking and to make further and better provision for the improvement health local government and finance of their district and for other purposes.
Ascot District Gas and Electricity Act 1935	25 & 26 Geo. 5. c. xcviii	2 August 1935
An Act to convert the existing capital of the Ascot District Gas and Electricity Company to authorise the raising of additional capital and for other purposes.
London, Midland and Scottish Railway Act 1935	25 & 26 Geo. 5. c. xcix	2 August 1935
An Act to empower the London Midland and Scottish Railway Company to acquire lands to revise the rules of the superannuation fund of the Company to make provision in relation to tolls and charges upon the canals of that Company and of the West London Extension Railway Company and for other purposes.
London County Council (Money) Act 1935 (repealed)	25 & 26 Geo. 5. c. c	2 August 1935
An Act to regulate the expenditure on capital account and lending of money by the London County Council during the financial period from the first day of April one thousand nine hundred and thirty-five to the thirtieth day of September one thousand nine hundred and thirty-six and for other purposes. (Repealed by London County Council (Loans) Act 1955 (4 & 5 Eliz. 2. c. xxvi))
Cambourne Water Act 1935	25 & 26 Geo. 5. c. ci	2 August 1935
An Act to authorise the Camborne Water Company to construct new waterworks and to raise further capital to confer additional powers upon the Company and for other purposes.
Exeter Corporation Act 1935	25 & 26 Geo. 5. c. cii	2 August 1935
An Act to authorise the mayor aldermen and citizens of the city of Exeter to construct a new street and other street works and to acquire lands for various purposes to confer further powers upon the said mayor aldermen and citizens with regard to their water electricity and markets undertakings and the health local government and improvement of the city and for other purposes.
Severn Navigation Act 1935	25 & 26 Geo. 5. c. ciii	2 August 1935
An Act to make further provision with respect to the tolls and charges applicable to the Severn Navigation and for other purposes.
Easington Rural District Council Act 1935	25 & 26 Geo. 5. c. civ	2 August 1935
An Act to empower the Easington Rural District Council to acquire certain lands compulsorily to confer further powers upon the Council in respect of their water undertakings and in regard to tents vans and huts to make further and better provision for the health local government and finance of the district and for other purposes.
Derwent Valley Water Act 1935	25 & 26 Geo. 5. c. cv	2 August 1935
An Act to amend provisions of the Derwent Valley Water Acts 1899 to 1920 to provide for the abandonment of certain of the works authorised by those Acts to be constructed by the Leicester Corporation and to authorise that corporation to construct other works and for other purposes.
Boston Corporation Act 1935	25 & 26 Geo. 5. c. cvi	2 August 1935
An Act to authorise the mayor aldermen and burgesses of the borough of Boston to extend their existing quays and to construct other works and to make further provision with regard to the port and harbour of Boston and the finance of the said borough and for other purposes.
Harrogate Corporation Act 1935	25 & 26 Geo. 5. c. cvii	2 August 1935
An Act to confer further powers upon the Mayor, Aldermen, and Burgesses of the Borough of Harrogate with respect to their electricity and other undertakings, and to make further provision in regard to the health, local government, improvement, and finance of that borough, and for other purposes.
Blackpool Improvement Act 1935	25 & 26 Geo. 5. c. cviii	2 August 1935
An Act to confer further powers upon the Blackpool Mayor, Aldermen, and Burgesses of the Borough of Blackpool; to make further provision in regard to their several undertakings; the granting of superannuation allowances and the health, local government, and improvement of that borough, and for other purposes.
Croydon Corporation Act 1935 (repealed)	25 & 26 Geo. 5. c. cix	2 August 1935
An Act to authorise the Mayor, Aldermen, and Burgesses of the Borough of Croydon to construct waterworks; to provide for the dissolution of the Croydon and Districts Joint Small Pox Hospital Board and for the transfer of the property of that board to the Corporation; to confer further powers upon the Corporation with regard to their water undertaking, and the health, local government, and improvement of the Borough, and for other purposes. (Repealed by Croydon Corporation Act 1960 (8 & 9 Eliz. 2. c. xl))
London Passenger Transport Act 1935	25 & 26 Geo. 5. c. cx	2 August 1935
An Act to empower the London Passenger Transport Board to provide certain services of trolley vehicles; to construct new works; to acquire lands; to raise additional moneys; to extend the time for the exercise of certain powers of the Board in relation to trolley vehicles; to confer further powers on the Board, and for other purposes.
Stoke-on-Trent Corporation Act 1935	25 & 26 Geo. 5. c. cxi	2 August 1935
An Act to authorise the abandonment of a portion of the Newcastle-under-Lyme Canal, and the transfer of the site of such portion to the Lord Mayor, Aldermen, and Citizens of the City of Stoke-on-Trent, and the construction of works and acquisition of lands by them in connection therewith; to confer further powers upon them and make further provision with respect to their gas and electricity undertakings; to make further provision for the health, local government, improvement, and finance of the city, and for other purposes.
Gelligaer Urban District Council Act 1935	25 & 26 Geo. 5. c. cxii	2 August 1935
An Act to empower the Urban District Council of Gelligaer to construct street improvements and to acquire lands for various purposes; to authorise the provision by the council of a crematorium; to make further provision in regard to their electricity undertaking and for the improvement, health, good government, and finances of their district, and for other purposes.
Hertfordshire County Council Act 1935	25 & 26 Geo. 5. c. cxiii	2 August 1935
An Act to confer further powers on the Hertfordshire County Council with reference to the acquisition of lands the improvement of roads control of building development and the preservation of the amenities of the County of Hertford and on certain undertakers in regard to the supply of electricity; to make further provision in relation to the health local government and finance of the county, and for other purposes.
Weymouth Waterworks Act 1935	25 & 26 Geo. 5. c. cxiv	2 August 1935
An Act to extend the limits of supply of the Company of Proprietors of the Weymouth Waterworks; to authorise the construction of new waterworks; to enlarge the capital and borrowing powers of the Company; to confer further powers upon the Company, and for other purposes.
Poole Road Transport Act 1935	25 & 26 Geo. 5. c. cxv	2 August 1935
An Act to make better provision with respect to road transport services in the Borough of Poole, and for other purposes.
Port of London Act 1935 (repealed)	25 & 26 Geo. 5. c. cxvi	2 August 1935
An Act to confer further powers on the Port of London Authority for the improvement and development of the Royal Victoria Dock and the Royal Albert Dock, and for other purposes. (Repealed by Port of London Act 1968 (c. xxxii))
St. Bartholomew's Hospital Act 1935	25 & 26 Geo. 5. c. cxvii	2 August 1935
An Act to enable the Governors of Saint Bartholomew's Hospital in the City of London to make and accept charges for the accommodation and treatment of certain patients and to provide accommodation in connection therewith, and for other purposes.
London Passenger Transport (Finance) Act 1935	25 & 26 Geo. 5. c. cxviii	2 August 1935
An Act to confer further powers upon the London Passenger Transport Board with respect to the borrowing of money, and for other purposes.
Nottingham Corporation Act 1935 (repealed)	25 & 26 Geo. 5. c. cxix	2 August 1935
An Act to authorise the lord mayor, aldermen, and citizens of the City of Nottingham and County of the same city to construct street works; and to make further provision with regard to the improvement, good government, and finance of the city, and for other purposes. (Repealed by Statute Law (Repeals) Act 1995 (c. 44))
Hoylake Urban District Council Act 1935	25 & 26 Geo. 5. c. cxx	2 August 1935
An Act to authorise the acquisition by the Hoylake Urban District Council of the Meols Commons the extinguishment of any rights therein which may still exist, the conveyance of parts of those lands to the Lord of the Manor absolutely and the retention by the Council of the remainder as public walks or pleasure grounds; the removal of restrictions on the exercise of the provisions of the Private Street Works Act 1892 (Note: Private Street Works Act 1892 (55 & 56 Vict. c. 57)) in respect of any street on each side of the Meols Sewer; to confer further powers on the Council with regard to their gas water and electricity undertakings and the health local government and improvement of the Hoylake Urban District, and for other purposes.
Weymouth and Melcombe Regis Corporation Act 1935	25 & 26 Geo. 5. c. cxxi	2 August 1935
An Act to empower the Mayor, Aldermen, and Burgesses of the Borough of Weymouth and Melcombe Regis to construct street works and acquire land for development; and to confer further powers on the Corporation with regard to the supply of electricity the health improvement development and good government of the said borough and for other purposes.
Birmingham Corporation Act 1935 (repealed)	25 & 26 Geo. 5. c. cxxii	2 August 1935
An Act to confer further powers upon the Lord Mayor, Aldermen, and Citizens of the City of Birmingham, to make further provision in regard to the health, local government, and improvement of the city and for other purposes. (Repealed by West Midlands County Council Act 1980 (c. xi))
Bridgwater Corporation Act 1935	25 & 26 Geo. 5. c. cxxiii	2 August 1935
An Act to authorise the Mayor Aldermen and Burgesses of the Borough of Bridgwater to construct additional waterworks and sewage works, and for other purposes.
Newcastle-upon-Tyne Corporation (General Powers) Act 1935	25 & 26 Geo. 5. c. cxxiv	2 August 1935
An Act to confer further powers upon the Lord Mayor, Aldermen, and Citizens of the City and County of Newcastle-upon-Tyne with reference to the good government and public health of the city; to make provisions relating to their quays and parks; to amend and consolidate the provisions relating to their road transport undertaking and the provisions relating to the finances of the city, and for other purposes.
Sunderland Corporation Act 1935	25 & 26 Geo. 5. c. cxxv	2 August 1935
An Act to extend the boundaries of the County Borough of Sunderland and for purposes incidental thereto; to authorise the Mayor, Aldermen, and Burgesses of the said County Borough to construct street works and to construct, maintain, and work tramways; to confer further powers upon the Corporation with regard to their electricity undertaking and with regard to the health, improvement, good government, and finance of the County Borough, and for other purposes.

== 26 Geo. 5 & 1 Edw. 8 ==
The first session of the 37th Parliament of the United Kingdom, which met from 26 November 1935 until 30 October 1936.

This session was also traditionally cited as 26 Geo. 5, 26 G. 5, 26 Geo. 5 & 1 Ed. 8 and 26 G. 5 & 1 E. 8.

=== Public general acts ===
Short title	Citation	Royal assent
Long title
Government of India (Reprinting) Act 1935 (repealed)	26 Geo. 5 & 1 Edw. 8. c. 1	20 December 1935
An Act to divide the Government of India Act, 1935, (Note: Government of India Act 1935 (25 & 26 Geo. 5. c. 42)) into two portions and to make in the wording thereof certain changes which either are consequential on the division or remove minor errors; to provide for the certification, the deposit with the Rolls of Parliament, and the printing, of the said portions as if they were separate Acts of Parliament; to secure that the said portions have effect in lieu of the said Government of India Act, 1935, as from the date of the passing of that Act; and for purposes connected with the matters aforesaid. (Repealed by Statute Law (Repeals) Act 1976 (c. 16))
Government of India Act 1935 (Note: Retroactive re-enactment by the Government of India (Reprinting) Act 1935 (26 Geo. 5 & 1 Edw. 8. c. 1) of part of the Government of India Act 1935 (25 & 26 Geo. 5. c. 42).) (repealed)	26 Geo. 5 & 1 Edw. 8. c. 2	20 December 1935 (Note: The reprinted acts were granted royal assent by the passing of the Government of India (Reprinting) Act 1935 (26 Geo. 5 & 1 Edw. 8. c. 1), but the resulting acts retained the royal assent date of the original act, 2 August 1935.)
An Act to make further provision for the government of India. (Repealed by Statute Law (Repeals) Act 1976 (c. 16) and Statute Law (Repeals) Act 1998 (c. 43))
Government of Burma Act 1935 (repealed)	26 Geo. 5 & 1 Edw. 8. c. 3	20 December 1935
An Act to make further provision for the government of Burma. (Repealed by Burma Independence Act 1947 (11 & 12 Geo. 6. c. 3))
Expiring Laws Continuance Act 1935 (repealed)	26 Geo. 5 & 1 Edw. 8. c. 4	20 December 1935
An Act to continue certain expiring laws. (Repealed by Statute Law Revision Act 1950 (14 Geo. 6. c. 6))
Public Works Loans Act 1935 (repealed)	26 Geo. 5 & 1 Edw. 8. c. 5	20 December 1935
An Act to grant money for the purpose of certain local loans out of the Local Loans Fund, and for other purposes relating to local loans. (Repealed by National Loans Act 1968 (c. 13))
Railways (Agreement) Act 1935 (Note: This was the last public act of the reign of King George V.) (repealed)	26 Geo. 5 & 1 Edw. 8. c. 6	20 December 1935
An Act to authorise the Treasury to guarantee securities issued in accordance with a certain agreement made on the thirtieth day of November, nineteen hundred and thirty-five, and to exempt the said agreement and certain other agreements from stamp duty. (Repealed by Statute Law Revision Act 1959 (7 & 8 Eliz. 2. c. 68))

=== Local acts ===
Short title	Citation	Royal assent
Long title
Bridge of Allan Gas Order Confirmation Act 1935	26 Geo. 5 & 1 Edw. 8. c. i	20 December 1935
An Act to confirm a Provisional Order under the Private Legislation Procedure (Scotland) Acts 1899 (Note: Private Legislation Procedure (Scotland) Act 1899 (62 & 63 Vict. c. 47)) and 1933 (Note: Private Legislation Procedure (Scotland) Act 1933 (23 & 24 Geo. 5. c. 37)) relating to Bridge of Allan Gas.
	Bridge of Allan Gas Order 1935 Provisional Order to authorise the provost magistrates and councillors of the burgh of Bridge of Allan to dispose of their gas undertaking to make certain provisions consequent thereon and for other purposes.	
National Trust for Scotland Order Confirmation Act 1935	26 Geo. 5 & 1 Edw. 8. c. ii	20 December 1935
An Act to confirm a Provisional Order under the Private Legislation Procedure (Scotland) Acts 1899 and 1933 relating to the National Trust for Scotland.
	National Trust for Scotland Order 1935 Provisional Order to incorporate and confer powers on the National Trust for Scotland for Places of Historic Interest or Natural Beauty and for other purposes.	
Rothesay Corporation Gas Order Confirmation Act 1935	26 Geo. 5 & 1 Edw. 8. c. iii	20 December 1935
An Act to confirm a Provisional Order under the Private Legislation Procedure (Scotland) Acts 1899 and 1933 relating to Rothesay Corporation Gas.
	Rothesay Corporation Gas Order 1935 Provisional Order to authorise the Corporation to carry on their gas undertaking and to make the necessary financial arrangements therefor and for other purposes.	
Campbeltown Harbour, Water and Gas Order Confirmation Act 1935	26 Geo. 5 & 1 Edw. 8. c. iv	20 December 1935
An Act to confirm a Provisional Order under the Private Legislation Procedure (Scotland) Acts 1899 and 1933 relating to Campbeltown Harbour, Water and Gas.
	Campbeltown Harbour, Water and Gas Order 1935 Provisional Order to make provision as to the maximum tolls rates duties and charges leviable at the harbour of Campbeltown to empower the provost magistrates and councillors of the royal burgh of Campbeltown to purchase certain waterworks of the Duke of Argyll and to authorise them to borrow further moneys for the purposes of their water and gas undertakings and for other purposes.	
Dundee Corporation Order Confirmation Act 1935	26 Geo. 5 & 1 Edw. 8. c. v	20 December 1935
An Act to confirm a Provisional Order under the Private Legislation Procedure (Scotland) Acts 1899 and 1933 relating to Dundee Corporation.
	Dundee Corporation Order 1935 Provisional Order to empower the Dundee Corporation to construct additional waterworks to extend their limited of compulsory water supply to transfer to the Corporation communication pipes or parts thereof under streets and for other purposes.	

== See also ==
- List of acts of the Parliament of the United Kingdom
