= Statute Law Revision Act (Northern Ireland) 1953 =

- Act of Parliament
- Parliament of Northern Ireland
- Long title: An Act to repeal certain enactments which have ceased to be in force or have become unnecessary, to amend the short title of 2 Anne c.5 (Ir.), and for purposes connected with the matters aforesaid.
- Citation: 1953 c. 1 (N.I.)
- Territorial extent: Northern Ireland

Dates
- Royal assent: 17 February 1953

Status: Amended

Revised text of statute as amended

The Statute Law Revision Act (Northern Ireland) 1953 (c. 1 (N.I.)) is an act of the Parliament of Northern Ireland.

This act is one of the Statute Law Revision Acts (Northern Ireland) 1952 and 1953 and the Statute Law Revision Acts (Northern Ireland) 1952 to 1954.

== Section 2 ==
This section amends the schedule to the Short Titles Act (Northern Ireland) 1951 (c 1) (NI) so as to alter the short title of 2 Anne c. 5 (I).

== Schedule ==
The schedule was repealed by section 1 of, and part II of the schedule to, the Statute Law Revision (Northern Ireland) Act 1973.
