= Summary Jurisdiction Act (Northern Ireland) 1953 =

- Act of Parliament
- Parliament of Northern Ireland
- Long title: An Act to provide for the making of summary jurisdiction rules; to extend the jurisdiction and powers of, and to amend the law relating to, courts of summary jurisdiction and justices out of petty sessions; and otherwise to make provision with respect to summary procedure and offences.
- Citation: 1953 c. 3 (N.I.)
- Territorial extent: Northern Ireland

Dates
- Royal assent: 17 February 1953

Text of the Summary Jurisdiction Act (Northern Ireland) 1953 as in force today (including any amendments) within the United Kingdom, from legislation.gov.uk.

The Summary Jurisdiction Act (Northern Ireland) 1953 (c. 3 (N.I.)) is an act of the Parliament of Northern Ireland that restricted the freedom of the press in relation to court proceedings in Northern Ireland.

== Provisions ==
It prohibited the press from publishing any opening statements, and gave the magistrate discretion to forbid the publishing of any evidence.

The act prohibited the publication of an opening statement made on behalf of the prosecution in the preliminary investigation of an indictable offence.
