= Statute Law Revision Act (Northern Ireland) 1952 =

- Act of Parliament
- Parliament of Northern Ireland
- Long title: An Act to authorise and facilitate the publication of a revised edition of the statutes affecting Northern Ireland, and to promote further the revision of the statute law by repealing enactments which have ceased to be in force or have become unnecessary, and for purposes connected with those matters.
- Citation: 1952 c. 1 (N.I.)
- Territorial extent: Northern Ireland

Dates
- Royal assent: 11 February 1952

Status: Amended

Text of statute as originally enacted

Revised text of statute as amended

The Statute Law Revision Act (Northern Ireland) 1952 (c. 1 (N.I.)) is an act of the Parliament of Northern Ireland.

This act was passed under powers conferred by the Statute Law Revision Act 1950.

This act is one of the Statute Law Revision Acts (Northern Ireland) 1952 and 1953 and the Statute Law Revision Acts (Northern Ireland) 1952 to 1954.

== Schedule ==
The Schedule was repealed by section 1 of, and Part II of the Schedule to, the Statute Law Revision (Northern Ireland) Act 1973.

== Sources ==
- "Statute Law Revision Act (Northern Ireland) 1952". The Public General Acts of 1952 : Being Acts passed in the Sixteenth Year of the Reign of His Majesty King George The Sixth and in the First Year of the Reign of Her Majesty Queen Elizabeth The Second and in part of the Third and Fourth Sessions of the Seventh Parliament of Northern Ireland. Belfast: HMSO. 1953. pp. 1–49.
