= Statute Law Revision (Northern Ireland) Act 1973 =

Act of the Parliament of the United Kingdom

Statute Law Revision (Northern Ireland) Act 1973 (Note: Section 3(1).)
- Act of Parliament
- Parliament of the United Kingdom
- Long title: An Act to revise the statute law of Northern Ireland by repealing obsolete, spent, unnecessary or superseded enactments and by correcting a mistake in the repeals effected by section 15(2) of the Civil Evidence Act (Northern Ireland) 1971.
- Citation: 1973 c. 55
- Territorial extent: Northern Ireland (Note: Section 3(2).)

Dates
- Royal assent: 25 July 1973
- Commencement: 25 July 1973 (Note: The Acts of Parliament (Commencement) Act 1793.)

Other legislation
- Amends: Civil Evidence Act (Northern Ireland) 1971
- Amended by: Statute Law (Repeals) Act 1977; Statute Law (Repeals) Act 1998
- Relates to: Repeal of Obsolete Statutes Act 1856; See Statute Law Revision Act

Status: Amended

Text of statute as originally enacted

The Statute Law Revision (Northern Ireland) Act 1973 (c. 55) is an act of the Parliament of the United Kingdom.

== Subsequent developments ==
Section 3(3) of the act was repealed by section 1(1) of, and part XII of schedule 1 to, the Statute Law (Repeals) Act 1977, which came into force on 16 June 1977.

Section 1 of, and the schedule to, the act was repealed by section 1(1) of, and group 1 of part IX of schedule 1 to, the Statute Law (Repeals) Act 1998, which came into force on 19 November 1998.

== See also ==
- Statute Law Revision Act

== Bibliography ==
- The Public General Acts 1973. HMSO. London. 1974. Volume II. Page 1623.
- HL Deb vol 342, cols 187 to 189, HC Deb vol 860, cols 1542 to 1543.
