= Industrial Development Act 1982 =

Act of the Parliament of the United Kingdom

Industrial Development Act 1982 (Note: Section 20(1).)
- Act of Parliament
- Parliament of the United Kingdom
- Long title: An Act to consolidate, with certain exceptions, the Local Employment Act 1972, Parts I and II of the Industry Act 1972, section 18 of the Industry Act 1980, section 6 of the Industry Act 1981 and related enactments.
- Citation: 1982 c. 52
- Territorial extent: England and Wales; Scotland; (Note: Section 20(3). Section 14 does not extend to Scotland. Part III, sections 11 and 12, and section 20, and (so far as they relate to enactments which extend to Northern Ireland) sections 15 and 19 and schedules 2 and 3, also extend to Northern Ireland.)

Dates
- Royal assent: 28 October 1982
- Commencement: 28 January 1983 (Note: Section 20(2).)

Other legislation
- Amends: Energy Act 1976; See § Repealed enactments
- Repeals/revokes: See § Repealed enactments
- Amended by: Co-operative Development Agency and Industrial Development Act 1984; Industrial Development Act 1985; Housing and Planning Act 1986; Income and Corporation Taxes Act 1988; Capital Allowances Act 1990; Planning (Consequential Provisions) Act 1990; Statute Law (Repeals) Act 1998; Statute Law (Repeals) Act 2004; Industry and Exports (Financial Support) Act 2009; Public Services Reform (Scotland) Act 2010; Enterprise Act 2016; Housing and Planning Act 2016; Industry and Exports (Financial Assistance) Act 2026

Status: Partially repealed

Text of statute as originally enacted

Revised text of statute as amended

Text of the Industrial Development Act 1982 as in force today (including any amendments) within the United Kingdom, from legislation.gov.uk.

The Industrial Development Act 1982 (c. 52) is an act of the Parliament of the United Kingdom that consolidated, with certain exceptions, enactments relating to industrial development and financial assistance for industry in Great Britain.

== Provisions ==
=== Repealed enactments ===
Section 19(2) of the act repealed 13 enactments and revoked 2 instruments, listed in schedule 3 to the act.

Enactments repealed and instruments revoked by section 19(2)
| Citation | Short title | Extent of repeal or revocation |
|---|---|---|
| 1972 c. 5 | Local Employment Act 1972 | Section 1. |
| 1972 c. 5 | Local Employment Act 1972 | Section 5. |
| 1972 c. 5 | Local Employment Act 1972 | Sections 7 and 9. |
| 1972 c. 5 | Local Employment Act 1972 | Sections 13 and 14. |
| 1972 c. 5 | Local Employment Act 1972 | Sections 16 to 18. |
| 1972 c. 5 | Local Employment Act 1972 | Section 20. |
| 1972 c. 5 | Local Employment Act 1972 | Section 21(1). |
| 1972 c. 5 | Local Employment Act 1972 | Section 22(3) and (4). |
| 1972 c. 5 | Local Employment Act 1972 | In schedule 2, paragraphs 3, 4, 8, 9 and 10. |
| 1972 c. 5 | Local Employment Act 1972 | Schedule 3, except the entries relating to the Industrial Development Act 1966 and the Finance Act 1970. |
| 1972 c. 52 | Town and Country Planning (Scotland) Act 1972 | In section 114(7), the words from "or in" onwards. |
| 1972 c. 52 | Town and Country Planning (Scotland) Act 1972 | In part II of schedule 21, the entry relating to the Local Employment Act 1972. |
| 1972 c. 63 | Industry Act 1972 | Parts I and II. |
| 1972 c. 63 | Industry Act 1972 | Sections 13 to 16. |
| 1972 c. 63 | Industry Act 1972 | In section 17(1), the words " Part II or ". |
| 1972 c. 63 | Industry Act 1972 | In section 18, in subsection (1) the words " Part II and " and subsection (3). |
| 1972 c. 63 | Industry Act 1972 | In section 19(2), the words " Schedule 2 and ". |
| 1972 c. 63 | Industry Act 1972 | In schedule 1, in paragraph 1(1) the words " Part I or ", paragraphs 2 and 3(3) and in paragraph 4(1) the words " Part I or ". |
| 1972 c. 63 | Industry Act 1972 | Schedule 2. |
| 1972 c. 63 | Industry Act 1972 | Part I of schedule 4. |
| 1973 c. 50 | Employment and Training Act 1973 | In section 14(1), the words from " but " onwards. |
| 1973 c. 50 | Employment and Training Act 1973 | In schedule 3, paragraphs 12 and 15. |
| 1973 c. 65 | Local Government (Scotland) Act 1973 | In schedule 23, paragraph 14. |
| 1974 c. 39 | Consumer Credit Act 1974 | In schedule 4, paragraph 33. |
| 1975 c. 68 | Industry Act 1975 | Section 22. |
| 1975 c. 68 | Industry Act 1975 | Section 39(2). |
| 1975 c. 68 | Industry Act 1975 | In schedule 4, part I. |
| 1975 c. 68 | Industry Act 1975 | Schedule 7. |
| 1980 c. 33 | Industry Act 1980 | Sections 16 to 18. |
| 1980 c. 33 | Industry Act 1980 | Schedule 1. |
| 1981 c. 6 | Industry Act 1981 | Section 6. |
| 1981 c. 13 | English Industrial Estates Corporation Act 1981 | Section 9(2). |
| 1981 c. 13 | English Industrial Estates Corporation Act 1981 | Section 10(4)(a). |
| 1981 c. 57 | Employment and Training Act 1981 | In schedule 2, paragraphs 6 and 7. |
| 1981 c. 67 | Acquisition of Land Act 1981 | In schedule 4, paragraph 22. |
| 1982 c. 18 | Industry Act 1982 | The whole act. |
Statutory Instruments
| SI 1973/243 | Regional Development Grants (Qualifying Activities) Order 1973 | The whole order. |
| SI 1976/1573 | Regional Development Grants (Qualifying Activities) Order 1976 | The whole order. |

== Subsequent developments ==
Part II of the act (which provided for regional development grants) was substituted by the Co-operative Development Agency and Industrial Development Act 1984, which introduced a revised scheme of grants for projects of investment in development areas. The Regional Development Grants (Termination) Act 1988 subsequently provided that no regional development grant in respect of a project of investment could be made after 31 March 1988. Part II was repealed, along with section 1(2), subsections (4) to (8) of section 1, section 11(3), section 15(2), section 16(4), section 18(1), schedule 1, and parts of schedule 2, by section 1(1) of, and schedule 1 to, the Statute Law (Repeals) Act 2004, which came into force on 22 July 2004.
