= Industry Act 1972 =

Act of the Parliament of the United Kingdom

Industry Act 1972 (Note: Section 19(1).)
- Act of Parliament
- Parliament of the United Kingdom
- Long title: An Act to authorise grants towards expenditure on the provision of assets for industry in certain regions in Great Britain, to authorise the provision of financial assistance for industry in those regions or elsewhere, and provisions about credits and grants for the building of ships and of offshore installations, to amend the Local Employment Act 1972 and to make temporary provision as to one of the areas to be treated as a development area under that Act; and for connected purposes.
- Citation: 1972 c. 63
- Territorial extent: England and Wales; Scotland; Northern Ireland; (Note: Section 18.)

Dates
- Royal assent: 9 August 1972
- Commencement: 9 August 1972 (Note: The Acts of Parliament (Commencement) Act 1793.)
Other legislation
Amends	Landlord and Tenant Act 1954; Local Employment Act 1960; Industrial Development Act 1966; Finance Act 1967; National Loans Act 1968; Industrial Expansion Act 1968; Development of Tourism Act 1969; Housing Act 1971; Town and Country Planning Act 1971; Local Employment Act 1972
Repeals/revokes	Shipbuilding Industry Act 1967; Shipbuilding Industry Act 1971
Amended by	Northern Ireland Constitution Act 1973; Criminal Procedure (Scotland) Act 1975; Industry Act 1975; Criminal Law Act 1977; Shipbuilding Act 1979; Criminal Justice (Northern Ireland) Order 1980; English Industrial Estates Corporation Act 1981; Criminal Justice Act 1982; Industrial Development Act 1982; Fines and Penalties (Northern Ireland) Order 1984; Industry Act 1972 (Amendment) Regulations 1987; Merchant Shipping Act 1995; Companies Act 2006 (Consequential Amendments, Transitional Provisions and Savings) Order 2009; Deregulation Act 2015

Status: Amended

Text of statute as originally enacted

Revised text of statute as amended

Text of the Industry Act 1972 as in force today (including any amendments) within the United Kingdom, from legislation.gov.uk.

The Industry Act 1972 (c. 63) is an act of the Parliament of the United Kingdom passed by Edward Heath's Conservative government.

== Background ==
The act, in the words of Treasury civil servant Leo Pliatzky, was intended to "strengthen our industrial capacity so as to take advantage of membership of the Common Market" which Britain would join in 1973.

The framework of the act was designed by a committee chaired by civil servant William Armstrong in secrecy.

== Provisions ==
The act set up two types of state assistance to industry, general and specific. The first type of assistance in the act consisted of free depreciation on new plant and machinery worth up to 100% capital allowance and the revival of regional state investment grants in regions with high unemployment. This was divided into four categories: Special Development Areas, Development Areas, Intermediate Areas and Derelict Land Clearance Areas. This provided assistance to nearly the whole country outside the South East. The act also founded the Industrial Development Executive to give selective assistance to individual companies.

In order to help the Department of Trade and Industry control prices, the act set up the Office of Fair Trading and the Consumer Protection Advisory Committee. This in effect revived the Consumer Council which the Conservatives had abolished two years previously.

== Reaction ==
Heath had been elected on a free market manifesto in 1970 and when the act's contents were published it was (according to Pliatzky) a "very great shock to some of the other members of the government, and some of those who were most committed to the market economy philosophy were really quite taken aback by the whole thing".

In May The Times reported that Conservative backbenchers expressed opposition to clause 7 of the act that provided state aid to the assisted areas because it "ran counter to all previous Conservative declarations" and because "it paid no regard to the economic viability of any company assisted". It was also reported that some (unnamed) Cabinet ministers were uneasy with the "socialist implications of the Bill" and that one had called it the "Lame Ducks (Unlimited) Bill".

However, there were no Cabinet resignations and it passed Second Reading in the House of Commons on 22 May without division, being supported by the Labour Party. Most Conservative MPs who spoke in the debate welcomed the act. However, Jock Bruce-Gardyne warned that "we are on a slippery slope once we start providing individual industries with inflation subsidies" but he was unable to find another MP to second him in order to force a vote.

Only two Conservatives voted against it in committee stage (John Biffen and Thomas Normanton). An amendment that subsidies worth more than £1 million should be laid before the Commons was supported by Biffen, Normanton, Bruce-Gardyne, Trevor Skeet and the Liberal MP John Pardoe but it was heavily defeated. However, the Chairman of the 1922 Committee, Sir Henry Legge-Bourke, warned the government in July that there was considerable opposition amongst distinguished and older party members because it was "a Socialist Bill by ethic and philosophy...obnoxious for many reasons". The government therefore amended it by limiting to £5 million the amount that could be given as a subsidy without needing the express approval of Parliament. It passed Third Reading without debate.

The Labour MP Tony Benn welcomed the act, praising it in an article titled "Heath's spadework for socialism":

[The Act is the] most comprehensive armoury of government control that has ever been assembled for use over private industry, far exceeding all the powers thought necessary by the last Labour government...Heath has performed a very important historical role in preparing for the fundamental and irreversible transfer in the balance of power and wealth which has to take place.

In the Commons Benn claimed that "We shall make use of the powers of the Bill, when we inherit power again, more radically than the right hon. Gentleman himself will use them".
