= List of acts of the Parliament of the United Kingdom from 1981 =

This is a list of acts of the Parliament of the United Kingdom passed in 1981.

Acts passed since 1963 are cited by calendar year, as opposed to the convention used for earlier acts of citing the regnal year(s) in which the relevant parliamentary session was held. Each act passed in a respective year is given a chapter number (abbreviated "c."), denoted by Arabic numerals in the case of public general acts, lowercase Roman numerals in the case of local acts, or italicised Arabic numerals in the case of personal acts. These run as separate series.

107 acts of Parliament were passed in 1981: 72 public general acts and 35 local acts.

indicates that an act has been transcribed on Wikisource, indicates that an act is available to view at legislation.gov.uk, and indicates the location of the original act in the Parliamentary Archives.

== Public general acts ==
Short title	Citation	Royal assent
Long title
Social Security (Contributions) Act 1981	1981 c. 1	29 January 1981
An Act to make provision in connection with certain contributions payable under the Social Security Act 1975. (Note: Social Security Act 1975 (c. 14))
Iron and Steel (Borrowing Powers) Act 1981	1981 c. 2	26 February 1981
An Act to increase the limit on the aggregate of sums borrowed by, or paid by the Secretary of State to, the British Steel Corporation and sums borrowed by the publicly-owned companies.
Gas Levy Act 1981 (repealed)	1981 c. 3	19 March 1981
An Act to impose on the British Gas Corporation a levy in respect of certain gas. (Repealed by Finance Act 1998 (c. 36))
Consolidated Fund Act 1981	1981 c. 4	19 March 1981
An Act to apply certain sums out of the Consolidated Fund to the service of the years ending on 31st March 1980 and 1981.
Redundancy Fund Act 1981	1981 c. 5	19 March 1981
An Act to increase the limit imposed by section 109(2) of the Employment Protection (Consolidation) Act 1978 (Note: Employment Protection (Consolidation) Act 1978 (c. 44)) on the aggregate amount which may be borrowed by the Secretary of State for the purposes of the Redundancy Fund.
Industry Act 1981 (repealed)	1981 c. 6	19 March 1981
An Act to increase financial limits which apply in connection with the National Enterprise Board, the Scottish Development Agency, the Welsh Development Agency and the Development Board for Rural Wales; to reduce the public dividend capital of the National Enterprise Board and of the two Agencies and the amount outstanding by way of loans made by the Secretary of State to the two Agencies; to provide for extending the period in relation to which schemes under the Shipbuilding (Redundancy Payments) Act 1978 (Note: Shipbuilding (Redundancy Payments) Act 1978) operate; and to provide for financial support in connection with certain matters affecting industry. (Repealed by Welsh Development Agency (Transfer of Functions to the National Assembly for Wales and Abolition) Order 2005 (SI 2005/3226))
House of Commons Members' Fund and Parliamentary Pensions Act 1981 (repealed)	1981 c. 7	19 March 1981
An Act to provide for payments out of the House of Commons Members' Fund to certain persons who have ceased to be Members of the House of Commons before 1965 or to their widows or widowers; to exclude the application of section 4(4) of the House of Commons Members' Fund Act 1948 (Note: House of Commons Members' Fund Act 1948 (11 & 12 Geo. 6. c. 36)) in certain cases; and to amend section 22(2) of the Parliamentary and other Pensions Act 1972. (Note: Parliamentary and other Pensions Act 1972 (c. 48)) (Repealed by House of Commons Members' Fund Act 2016 (c. 18))
European Assembly Elections Act 1981 (repealed)	1981 c. 8	19 March 1981
An Act to amend the provisions of Schedule 2 to the European Assembly Elections Act 1978 (Note: European Assembly Elections Act 1978 (c. 10)) with respect to the supplementary reports affecting Assembly constituencies to be submitted by the Boundary Commission for any part of Great Britain following reviews of parliamentary constituencies. (Repealed by European Parliamentary Elections Act 1999 (c. 1))
International Organisations Act 1981	1981 c. 9	15 April 1981
An Act to make further provision as to the privileges and immunities to be accorded in respect of certain international organisations and in respect of persons connected with such organisations and other persons; and for purposes connected therewith.
Merchant Shipping Act 1981 (repealed)	1981 c. 10	15 April 1981
An Act to replace by amounts equivalent to special drawing rights of the International Monetary Fund the amounts in gold francs specified in certain provisions limiting the liability of shipowners and others. (Repealed by Merchant Shipping Act 1995 (c. 21))
Parliamentary Commissioner (Consular Complaints) Act 1981	1981 c. 11	15 April 1981
An Act to extend the circumstances in which complaints about consular actions can be made under the Parliamentary Commissioner Act 1967. (Note: Parliamentary Commissioner Act 1967 (c. 13))
Water Act 1981	1981 c. 12	15 April 1981
An Act to provide for increasing the borrowing powers of the British Waterways Board and to make further provision relating to water supply.
English Industrial Estates Corporation Act 1981 (repealed)	1981 c. 13	15 April 1981
An Act to consolidate the law relating to the English Industrial Estates Corporation. (Repealed by Leasehold Reform, Housing and Urban Development Act 1993 (c. 28))
Public Passenger Vehicles Act 1981	1981 c. 14	15 April 1981
An Act to consolidate certain enactments relating to public passenger vehicles.
National Film Finance Corporation Act 1981 (repealed)	1981 c. 15	15 April 1981
An Act to consolidate the Cinematograph Film Production (Special Loans) Acts 1949 to 1980 and to repeal, as spent, certain enactments relating to the National Film Finance Corporation. (Repealed by Statute Law (Repeals) Act 1993 (c. 50))
Film Levy Finance Act 1981 (repealed)	1981 c. 16	15 April 1981
An Act to consolidate the Cinematograph Films Acts 1957 to 1980. (Repealed by Statute Law (Repeals) Act 1993 (c. 50))
Energy Conservation Act 1981 (repealed)	1981 c. 17	21 May 1981
An Act to make provision for regulating the design, construction and operation of certain energy-consuming appliances and otherwise with respect to the nation's use of energy. (Repealed by Statute Law (Repeals) Act 2004 (c. 14))
Disused Burial Grounds (Amendment) Act 1981	1981 c. 18	21 May 1981
An Act to amend the Disused Burial Grounds Act 1884 to enable building to take place on certain disused burial grounds with appropriate safeguards; and for purposes connected therewith.
Statute Law (Repeals) Act 1981	1981 c. 19	21 May 1981
An Act to promote the reform of the statute law by the repeal, in accordance with recommendations of the Law Commission and the Scottish Law Commission, of certain enactments which (except in so far as their effect is preserved) are no longer of practical utility.
Judicial Pensions Act 1981	1981 c. 20	21 May 1981
An Act to consolidate certain enactments relating to pensions and other benefits payable in respect of service in judicial office, with amendments to give effect to recommendations of the Law Commission and the Scottish Law Commission.
Ports (Financial Assistance) Act 1981	1981 c. 21	11 June 1981
An Act to provide financial assistance to the Port of London Authority and the Mersey Docks and Harbour Company; and to increase the limit on sums borrowed by the National Dock Labour Board.
Animal Health Act 1981	1981 c. 22	11 June 1981
An Act to consolidate the Diseases of Animals Act 1935, (Note: Diseases of Animals Act 1935 (25 & 26 Geo. 5. c. 31)) the Diseases of Animals Act 1950, (Note: Diseases of Animals Act 1950 (14 Geo. 6. c. 36)) the Ponies Act 1969, (Note: Ponies Act 1969 (c. 28)) the Rabies Act 1974, (Note: Rabies Act 1974 (c. 17)) the Diseases of Animals Act 1975, (Note: Diseases of Animals Act 1975 (c. 40)) and certain related enactments.
Local Government (Miscellaneous Provisions) (Scotland) Act 1981	1981 c. 23	11 June 1981
An Act to make further provision as regards local government in Scotland; to amend the Housing (Scotland) Acts 1966 to 1980; to postpone the effect of certain provisions of the Education (Scotland) Act 1980; (Note: Education (Scotland) Act 1980 (c. 44)) to amend the Chronically Sick and Disabled Persons Act 1970 (Note: Chronically Sick and Disabled Persons Act 1970 (c. 44)) in its application to Scotland; and for connected purposes.
Matrimonial Homes and Property Act 1981	1981 c. 24	2 July 1981
An Act to amend the Matrimonial Homes Act 1967, (Note: Matrimonial Homes Act 1967 (c. 75)) and to make further provision as to the rights of husbands and wives to possession or occupation of any matrimonial home or former matrimonial home, and as to orders for the sale of property under the Matrimonial Causes Act 1973. (Note: Matrimonial Causes Act 1973 (c. 18))
Industrial Diseases (Notification) Act 1981	1981 c. 25	2 July 1981
An Act to make further provision for regulations concerning the notification and certification of death and for the recording of information relating to industrial disease; and matters related thereto.
Food and Drugs (Amendment) Act 1981 (repealed)	1981 c. 26	2 July 1981
An Act to amend the law of England and Wales so as to exempt certain premises from registration under section 16 of the Food and Drugs Act 1955. (Repealed by Food Act 1984 (c. 30))
Criminal Justice (Amendment) Act 1981	1981 c. 27	2 July 1981
An Act to amend the law relating to the restriction of reports of committal proceedings in magistrates' courts in cases where there is more than one accused.
Licensing (Alcohol Education and Research) Act 1981 (repealed)	1981 c. 28	2 July 1981
An Act to abolish the functions of compensation authorities under the Licensing Act 1964 (Note: Licensing Act 1964 (c. 26)) and to use the assets remaining in the compensation funds managed by those authorities for education about and research into the misuse of alcohol and for other purposes. (Repealed by Health and Social Care Act 2012 (c. 7))
Fisheries Act 1981	1981 c. 29	2 July 1981
An Act to establish a Sea Fish Industry Authority with the duty of promoting the efficiency of the sea fish industry in the United Kingdom; to provide financial assistance for that industry; to amend the law relating to the regulation of sea fishing; to make new provision in relation to fish farming; to amend the enactments relating to whales and the importation of live fish; to extend sections 6 and 7 of the Freshwater and Salmon Fisheries (Scotland) Act 1976 (Note: Freshwater and Salmon Fisheries (Scotland) Act 1976 (c. 22)) to the part of the River Tweed outside Scotland; to repeal section 5(3) of the Fishery Board (Scotland) Act 1882; (Note: Fishery Board (Scotland) Act 1882 (45 & 46 Vict. c. 78)) and to enable the Department of Agriculture for Northern Ireland to incur expenditure on fishery protection in waters adjacent to Northern Ireland.
Horserace Betting Levy Act 1981	1981 c. 30	2 July 1981
An Act to make provision for and in connection with the making of payments on account of the levy payable under section 27 of the Betting, Gaming and Lotteries Act 1963 (Note: Betting, Gaming and Lotteries Act 1963 (c. 2)) by bookmakers to the Horserace Betting Levy Board.
Insurance Companies Act 1981 (repealed)	1981 c. 31	2 July 1981
An Act to amend the law relating to insurance companies. (Repealed by Financial Services and Markets Act 2000 (Consequential Amendments) Order 2002 (SI 2002/1555))
Transport Act 1962 (Amendment) Act 1981 or the Speller Act	1981 c. 32	2 July 1981
An Act to make provision with respect to experimental railway passenger services.
Social Security Act 1981	1981 c. 33	2 July 1981
An Act to amend the law relating to social security, and the calculation of maternity pay; and to provide for the modification of the Pensions Appeal Tribunals Act 1943.
Representation of the People Act 1981	1981 c. 34	2 July 1981
An Act to disqualify certain persons for election to the House of Commons; to make changes in the timetable for parliamentary elections; and for connected purposes.
Finance Act 1981	1981 c. 35	27 July 1981
An Act to grant certain duties, to alter other duties, and to amend the law relating to the National Debt and the Public Revenue, and to make further provision in connection with Finance.
Town and Country Planning (Minerals) Act 1981 (repealed)	1981 c. 36	27 July 1981
An Act to make amendments relating to the winning and working of minerals in the Town and Country Planning Act 1971 (Note: Town and Country Planning Act 1971 (c. 78)) and the Town and Country Planning (Scotland) Act 1972 (Note: Town and Country Planning (Scotland) Act 1972 (c. 52)) and amendments relating to rights for the purpose of the conveyance of minerals in section 2 of the Mines (Working Facilities and Support) Act 1966; (Note: Mines (Working Facilities and Support) Act 1966 (c. 4)) and for connected purposes. (Repealed by Planning (Consequential Provisions) (Scotland) Act 1997 (c. 11))
Zoo Licensing Act 1981	1981 c. 37	27 July 1981
An Act to regulate by licence the conduct of zoos.
British Telecommunications Act 1981	1981 c. 38	27 July 1981
An Act to establish a public corporation to be called British Telecommunications; to make provision with respect to its functions and to transfer to it certain property, rights and liabilities of the Post Office; to make further provision with respect to the Post Office; to provide for dealings by the Treasury in the shares of Cable and Wireless Limited; to amend the Telegraph Acts; and for connected purposes. (Repealed for the Isle of Man by Statute Law (Repeals) Act 2004 (c. 14))
Forestry Act 1981	1981 c. 39	27 July 1981
An Act to amend the Forestry Act 1967, (Note: Forestry Act 1967 (c. 10)) and for connected purposes.
Licensing (Amendment) Act 1981 (repealed)	1981 c. 40	27 July 1981
An Act to amend the Licensing Act 1964 in relation to special hours certificates. (Repealed by Licensing Act 2003 (c. 17))
Local Government and Planning (Amendment) Act 1981 (repealed)	1981 c. 41	27 July 1981
An Act to provide for control over listed buildings and for the enforcement of planning control and of control of listed buildings. (Repealed by Planning (Consequential Provisions) Act 1990 (c. 11))
Indecent Displays (Control) Act 1981	1981 c. 42	27 July 1981
An Act to make fresh provision with respect to the public display of indecent matter; and for purposes connected therewith.
Disabled Persons Act 1981	1981 c. 43	27 July 1981
An Act to impose on highway authorities and other persons executing or proposing to execute works on highways a duty to have regard to the needs of disabled and blind persons; to amend the Road Traffic Regulation Act 1967 (Note: Road Traffic Regulation Act 1967 (c. 76)) in relation to persons who improperly seek to avail themselves of concessions provided for disabled persons; to impose a duty on planning authorities in England and Wales to draw the attention of persons to whom they grant planning permission to certain statutory and other provisions relating to access for disabled persons to buildings and other premises used by the public; to require local authorities in England and Wales when serving a notice under section 20 of the Local Government (Miscellaneous Provisions) Act 1976 (Note: Local Government (Miscellaneous Provisions) Act 1976 (c. 57)) to draw the attention of the person on whom it is served to certain statutory and other provisions relating to the needs of disabled persons; to make further provision for the display of signs giving information as to such access; to require the Secretary of State to lay before Parliament a report as to proposals for ensuring or facilitating the improvement of means of access to such buildings and premises; to amend the law relating to the duty to make provision for the needs of disabled persons using certain buildings and premises; to facilitate the making of corresponding amendments to the law of Northern Ireland; and for connected purposes.
Countryside (Scotland) Act 1981	1981 c. 44	27 July 1981
An Act to make further provision for the better enjoyment of the Scottish countryside, and as respects the Countryside Commission for Scotland; to amend the Countryside (Scotland) Act 1967; (Note: Countryside (Scotland) Act 1967 (c. 86)) and for connected purposes.
Forgery and Counterfeiting Act 1981	1981 c. 45	27 July 1981
An Act to make fresh provision for England and Wales and Northern Ireland with respect to forgery and kindred offences; to make fresh provision for Great Britain and Northern Ireland with respect to the counterfeiting of notes and coins and kindred offences; to amend the penalties for offences under section 63 of the Post Office Act 1953; (Note: Post Office Act 1953 (1 & 2 Eliz. 2. c. 36)) and for connected purposes.
Iron and Steel Act 1981 (repealed)	1981 c. 46	27 July 1981
An Act to modify the functions of the British Steel Corporation; to make further provision with respect to the finances of the Corporation and the publicly-owned companies; to remove from the Secretary of State the duty to lay before Parliament certain statements about members of the Corporation; and for connected purposes. (Repealed by Iron and Steel Act 1982 (c. 25))
Criminal Attempts Act 1981	1981 c. 47	27 July 1981
An Act to amend the law of England and Wales as to attempts to commit offences and as to cases of conspiring to commit offences which, in the circumstances, cannot be committed; to repeal the provisions of section 4 of the Vagrancy Act 1824 (Note: Vagrancy Act 1824 (5 Geo. 4. c. 83)) which apply to suspected persons and reputed thieves; to make provision against unauthorised interference with vehicles; and for connected purposes.
Atomic Energy (Miscellaneous Provisions) Act 1981	1981 c. 48	27 July 1981
An Act to extend the power of the United Kingdom Atomic Energy Authority to dispose of shares held by them in any company and the power of the Secretary of State to dispose of shares held by him in companies engaged in activities in the field of atomic energy or radioactive substances; to extend the power of the Secretary of State with respect to the application of sums received by the Authority; and for connected purposes.
Contempt of Court Act 1981	1981 c. 49	27 July 1981
An Act to amend the law relating to contempt of court and related matters.
Friendly Societies Act 1981 (repealed)	1981 c. 50	27 July 1981
An Act to repeal section 2(1) of the Friendly Societies Act 1974. (Note: Friendly Societies Act 1974 (c. 46)) (Repealed by Financial Services and Markets Act 2000 (Mutual Societies) Order 2001 (SI 2001/2617))
Appropriation Act 1981	1981 c. 51	28 July 1981
An Act to apply a sum out of the Consolidated Fund to the service of the year ending on 31st March 1982, to appropriate the supplies granted in this Session of Parliament, and to repeal certain Consolidated Fund and Appropriation Acts.
Belize Act 1981	1981 c. 52	28 July 1981
An Act to make provision for, and in connection with, the attainment by Belize of independence within the Commonwealth.
Deep Sea Mining Act 1981 or the Deep Sea Mining (Temporary Provisions) Act 1981 (Note: The original short title of the Deep Sea Mining Act 1981 was the Deep Sea Mining (Temporary Provisions) Act 1981, but this was amended by the Deep Sea Mining Act 2014 (c. 15) on 14 July 2014.)	1981 c. 53	28 July 1981
An Act to make provision with respect to deep sea mining operations; and for purposes connected therewith.
Senior Courts Act 1981 or the Supreme Court Act 1981 (Note: The original short title of the Senior Courts Act 1981 was the Supreme Court Act 1981, but this was amended by the Constitutional Reform Act 2005 (c. 4) on 1 October 2009. At the same time, the term "Supreme Court" in the long title was amended to "Senior Courts".)	1981 c. 54	28 July 1981
An Act to consolidate with amendments the Supreme Court of Judicature (Consolidation) Act 1925 (Note: Supreme Court of Judicature (Consolidation) Act 1925 (15 & 16 Geo. 5. c. 49)) and other enactments relating to the Senior Courts in England and Wales and the administration of justice therein; to repeal certain obsolete or unnecessary enactments so relating; to amend Part VIII of the Mental Health Act 1959, (Note: Mental Health Act 1959 (7 & 8 Eliz. 2. c. 72)) the Courts-Martial (Appeals) Act 1968, (Note: Courts-Martial (Appeals) Act 1968 (c. 20)) the Arbitration Act 1979 (Note: Arbitration Act 1979 (c. 42)) and the law relating to county courts; and for connected purposes.
Armed Forces Act 1981	1981 c. 55	28 July 1981
An Act to continue the Army Act 1955, (Note: Army Act 1955 (3 & 4 Eliz. 2. c. 18)) the Air Force Act 1955 (Note: Air Force Act 1955 (3 & 4 Eliz. 2. c. 19)) and the Naval Discipline Act 1957; (Note: Naval Discipline Act 1957 (5 & 6 Eliz. 2. c. 53)) to amend those Acts and other enactments relating to the armed forces; to confer new powers for the temporary detention abroad of servicemen or civilians subject to those Acts suffering from mental disorder or the children of service and certain civilian families in need of care or control; to complete the assimilation for statutory purposes of the women's services with the rest of the armed forces; to amend the Patents Act 1977 (Note: Patents Act 1977 (c. 37)) in relation to inventions by members of the armed forces; to abolish the office of Accountant General of the Navy; to make further provision in relation to the naval prize cash balance; and for connected purposes.
Transport Act 1981	1981 c. 56	31 July 1981
An Act to make provision with respect to the disposal by the British Railways Board of part of their undertaking, property, rights and liabilities; to provide for the reconstitution of the British Transport Docks Board under the name of Associated British Ports and to confer on a company powers over that body corresponding to the powers of a holding company over a wholly-owned subsidiary; to dissolve the National Ports Council and amend the Harbours Act 1964; (Note: Harbours Act 1964 (c. 40)) to make further provision for promoting road safety; to make provision with respect to road humps; to provide a new basis of vehicle excise duty for goods vehicles; to amend the law as to the payments to be made for cab licences and cab drivers' licences; to make provision for grants to assist the provision of facilities for freight haulage by inland waterway; to make provision with respect to railway fires; to amend Schedules 7 and 8 to the Public Passenger Vehicles Act 1981; (Note: Public Passenger Vehicles Act 1981 (c. 14)) and for connected purposes.
Employment and Training Act 1981	1981 c. 57	31 July 1981
An Act to amend the Industrial Training Act 1964; (Note: Industrial Training Act 1964 (c. 16)) to abolish the Employment Service Agency and the Training Services Agency; to provide for the retention of receipts by certain bodies; and for connected purposes.
Education (Scotland) Act 1981	1981 c. 58	30 October 1981
An Act to amend the law relating to education in Scotland; to amend the Teaching Council (Scotland) Act 1965; (Note: Teaching Council (Scotland) Act 1965 (c. 19)) and to transfer to the respective University Courts the power of appointing the Principals of the Universities of St. Andrews, Glasgow and Aberdeen.
Matrimonial Homes (Family Protection) (Scotland) Act 1981	1981 c. 59	30 October 1981
An Act to make new provision for Scotland as to the rights of occupancy of spouses in a matrimonial home and of cohabiting couples in the house where they cohabit; to provide for the transfer of the tenancy of a matrimonial home between the spouses in certain circumstances during marriage and on granting decree of divorce or nullity of marriage, and for the transfer of the tenancy of a house occupied by a cohabiting couple between the partners in certain circumstances; to strengthen the law relating to matrimonial interdicts; and for connected purposes.
Education Act 1981 (repealed)	1981 c. 60	30 October 1981
An Act to make provision with respect to children with special educational needs. (Repealed by Education Act 1996 (c. 56))
British Nationality Act 1981	1981 c. 61	30 October 1981
An Act to make fresh provision about citizenship and nationality, and to amend the Immigration Act 1971 (Note: Immigration Act 1971 (c. 77)) as regards the right of abode in the United Kingdom.
Companies Act 1981 (repealed)	1981 c. 62	30 October 1981
An Act to amend the law relating to companies and business names. (Repealed by Companies Consolidation (Consequential Provisions) Act 1985 (c. 9))
Betting and Gaming Duties Act 1981	1981 c. 63	30 October 1981
An Act to consolidate certain enactments concerning the duties of excise relating to betting and gaming.
New Towns Act 1981	1981 c. 64	30 October 1981
An Act to consolidate certain enactments relating to new towns and connected matters, being (except for section 43 of the New Towns Act 1965 (Note: New Towns Act 1965 (c. 59)) and sections 126 and 127 of the Local Government, Planning and Land Act 1980 (Note: Local Government, Planning and Land Act 1980 (c. 65)) and certain related provisions) enactments which apply only to England and Wales.
Trustee Savings Banks Act 1981	1981 c. 65	30 October 1981
An Act to consolidate the Trustee Savings Banks Acts 1969 to 1978, with amendments to give effect to recommendations of the Law Commission and the Scottish Law Commission.
Compulsory Purchase (Vesting Declarations) Act 1981	1981 c. 66	30 October 1981
An Act to consolidate the provisions of the Town and Country Planning Act 1968 (Note: Town and Country Planning Act 1968 (c. 72)) concerning general vesting declarations, and related enactments.
Acquisition of Land Act 1981	1981 c. 67	30 October 1981
An Act to consolidate the Acquisition of Land (Authorisation Procedure) Act 1946 (Note: Acquisition of Land (Authorisation Procedure) Act 1946 (9 & 10 Geo. 6. c. 49)) and related enactments.
Broadcasting Act 1981	1981 c. 68	30 October 1981
An Act to consolidate the Independent Broadcasting Authority Acts 1973, (Note: Independent Broadcasting Authority Act 1973 (c. 19)) 1974 (Note: Independent Broadcasting Authority Act 1974 (c. 16)) and 1978 (Note: Independent Broadcasting Authority Act 1978 (c. 43)) and the Broadcasting Act 1980. (Note: Broadcasting Act 1980 (c. 64))
Wildlife and Countryside Act 1981	1981 c. 69	30 October 1981
An Act to repeal and re-enact with amendments the Protection of Birds Acts 1954 to 1967 and the Conservation of Wild Creatures and Wild Plants Act 1975; (Note: Conservation of Wild Creatures and Wild Plants Act 1975 (c. 48)) to prohibit certain methods of killing or taking wild animals; to amend the law relating to protection of certain mammals; to restrict the introduction of certain animals and plants; to amend the Endangered Species (Import and Export) Act 1976; (Note: Endangered Species (Import and Export) Act 1976 (c. 72)) to amend the law relating to nature conservation, the countryside and National Parks and to make provision with respect to the Countryside Commission; to amend the law relating to public rights of way; and for connected purposes.
Consolidated Fund (No. 2) Act 1981	1981 c. 70	22 December 1981
An Act to apply certain sums out of the Consolidated Fund to the service of the years ending on 31st March 1982 and 1983.
Nuclear Industry (Finance) Act 1981 (repealed)	1981 c. 71	22 December 1981
An Act to alter the financial limit imposed by section 2(1) of the Nuclear Industry (Finance) Act 1977 (Note: Nuclear Industry (Finance) Act 1977 (c. 7)) in relation to British Nuclear Fuels Limited. (Repealed by Atomic Energy Act 1989 (c. 7))
Housing (Amendment) (Scotland) Act 1981 (repealed)	1981 c. 72	22 December 1981
An Act to amend section 25(1) of the Housing (Financial Provisions) (Scotland) Act 1968. (Note: Housing (Financial Provisions) (Scotland) Act 1968 (c. 31)) (Repealed by Housing (Scotland) Act 1987 (c. 26))

== Local acts ==
Short title	Citation	Royal assent
Long title
Bearsden & Milngavie District Council Order Confirmation Act 1981 (repealed)	1981 c. i	29 January 1981
An Act to confirm a Provisional Order under the Private Legislation Procedure (Scotland) Act 1936, (Note: Private Legislation Procedure (Scotland) Act 1936 (26 Geo. 5 & 1 Edw. 8. c. 52)) relating to Bearsden & Milngavie District Council. (Repealed by Statute Law (Repeals) Act 1998 (c. 43))
	Bearsden & Milngavie District Council Order 1980 (Note: Although passed in 1981, the short title specifies the year 1980.) Provisional Order to confer powers on the Bearsden & Milngavie District Council with respect to stray dogs; and for other purposes.	
Churches and Universities (Scotland) Widows' and Orphans' Fund (Amendment) Order Confirmation Act 1981	1981 c. ii	29 January 1981
An Act to confirm a Provisional Order under the Private Legislation Procedure (Scotland) Act 1936, relating to Churches and Universities (Scotland) Widows' and Orphans' Fund (Amendment).
	Churches and Universities (Scotland) Widows' and Orphans' Fund (Amendment) Order 1980 Provisional Order to confer further powers on the Trustees of the Churches and Universities (Scotland) Widows' and Orphans' Fund; and for other purposes.	
Cumnock and Doon Valley District Council Order Confirmation Act 1981 (repealed)	1981 c. iii	29 January 1981
An Act to confirm a Provisional Order under the Private Legislation Procedure (Scotland) Act 1936, relating to Cumnock and Doon Valley District Council. (Repealed by Statute Law (Repeals) Act 1995 (c. 44))
	Cumnock and Doon Valley District Council Order 1980 Provisional Order to confer powers on the Cumnock and Doon Valley District Council with respect to stray dogs; and for other purposes.	
Dunfermline District Council Order Confirmation Act 1981 (repealed)	1981 c. iv	29 January 1981
An Act to confirm a Provisional Order under the Private Legislation Procedure (Scotland) Act 1936, relating to Dunfermline District Council. (Repealed by Statute Law (Repeals) Act 1995 (c. 44))
	Dunfermline District Council order 1980 Provisional Order to confer powers on the Dunfermline District Council with respect to stray dogs; and for other purposes.	
Peterhead Harbours Order Confirmation Act 1981 (repealed)	1981 c. v	29 January 1981
An Act to confirm a Provisional Order under the Private Legislation Procedure (Scotland) Act 1936, relating to Peterhead Harbours. (Repealed by Peterhead Harbours Order Confirmation Act 1992 (c. xii))
	Peterhead Harbours Order 1980 Provisional Order to confer further powers on the Trustees of the Harbours of Peterhead with respect to their power to borrow money; and for other purposes.	
Felixstowe Dock and Railway Act 1981	1981 c. vi	26 February 1981
An Act to empower the Felixstowe Dock and Railway Company to construct works; to extend and alter the limits of the dock; to confer further powers on the Company; and for other purposes.
Charterhouse Japhet Act 1981	1981 c. vii	15 April 1981
An Act to provide for the transfer to Charterhouse Japhet Limited of the undertaking of Keyser Ullmann Limited; and for other purposes.
Lloyds Bank Act 1981	1981 c. viii	15 April 1981
An Act to provide for the transfer to Lloyds Bank Limited of the undertaking of Lewis's Bank Limited; and for other purposes incidental thereto and consequential thereon.
Greater Manchester Act 1981	1981 c. ix	15 April 1981
An Act to re-enact with amendments and to extend certain local enactments in force within the metropolitan county of Greater Manchester; to confer further powers on the Greater Manchester County Council, the Borough Council of Bolton, the Council of the Metropolitan Borough of Bury, the Council of the City of Manchester, the Oldham Borough Council, the Rochdale Borough Council, the Council of the City of Salford, the Metropolitan Borough Council of Stockport, the Tameside Metropolitan Borough Council, the Trafford Borough Council and the Wigan Borough Council; to make further provision with regard to the environment, local government and improvement of the county; and for other purposes.
Allied Irish Banks Act 1981	1981 c. x	15 April 1981
An Act to provide for the transfer to Allied Irish Banks Limited of the undertaking and business of Provincial Bank of Ireland Limited; and for other purposes.
Western Isles Islands Council (Berneray Ferry) Order Confirmation Act 1981	1981 c. xi	21 May 1981
An Act to confirm a Provisional Order under the Private Legislation Procedure (Scotland) Act 1936, relating to the Western Isles Islands Council (Berneray Ferry).
	Western Isles Islands Council (Berneray Ferry) Order 1981 Provisional Order to empower the Western Isles Islands Council to construct works at the islands of Berneray and North Uist; and for other purposes.	
Barnsley Borough Council Act 1981	1981 c. xii	21 May 1981
An Act for the better prevention of trespassing on school and sports premises maintained in whole or in part by the Barnsley Borough Council; and for purposes incidental thereto.
British Railways (Victoria) Act 1981	1981 c. xiii	21 May 1981
An Act to relieve the British Railways Board from certain statutory obligations relating to Victoria Station in London; and for other purposes.
Sion College Act 1981	1981 c. xiv	11 June 1981
An Act to repeal the Sion College Act 1956; (Note: Sion College Act 1956 (4 & 5 Eliz. 2. c. li)) and for other purposes.
British Railways (Pension Schemes) Act 1981	1981 c. xv	2 July 1981
An Act to transfer to a new company to be established for that purpose the trusteeships of the British Railways Board in respect of certain pension schemes of the Board; to transfer the assets relating to such schemes; and for other purposes.
Whitehaven Harbour Act 1981	1981 c. xvi	2 July 1981
An Act to increase the borrowing powers of the Whitehaven Harbour Commissioners; to confer on the Commissioners further powers pursuant to the Harbours, Docks, and Piers Clauses Act 1847; (Note: Harbours, Docks, and Piers Clauses Act 1847 (10 & 11 Vict. c. 27)) to make further provision for the regulation of the harbour; and for purposes connected therewith.
Greater London Council (General Powers) Act 1981	1981 c. xvii	2 July 1981
An Act to confer further powers upon the Greater London Council and other authorities; and for other purposes.
County of Kent Act 1981	1981 c. xviii	27 July 1981
An Act to re-enact with amendments and to extend certain local enactments in force within the county of Kent; to make further provision in regard to the improvement, health and local government of that county; to confer further powers upon the local authorities of that county; to empower the Thanet District Council to acquire by agreement the undertaking of the company of proprietors of Margate Pier and Harbour; and for other purposes.
South Yorkshire Act 1981	1981 c. xix	27 July 1981
An Act to amend the references to the Highways Act 1980 (Note: Highways Act 1980 (c. 66)) in the South Yorkshire Act 1980. (Note: South Yorkshire Act 1980 (c. xxxvii))
Wallerawang Collieries, Limited Act 1981	1981 c. xx	27 July 1981
An Act to make provision for the transfer to the State of New South Wales in the Commonwealth of Australia of the incorporation of The Wallerawang Collieries Limited; for the cesser of application to that company of provisions of the Companies Acts 1948 to 1980; and for other purposes incidental thereto.
Peterborough Development Corporation Act 1981	1981 c. xxi	27 July 1981
An Act to confer powers upon the Peterborough Development Corporation in relation to the production and supply of heat by the Corporation; and for other purposes.
Preston Borough Council Act 1981	1981 c. xxii	27 July 1981
An Act to empower the Preston Borough Council to close the port and harbour of Preston, to repeal the Ribble Navigation Acts 1883 to 1964; and for other purposes.
British Railways Act 1981	1981 c. xxiii	27 July 1981
An Act to empower the British Railways Board to construct works and to acquire lands; to empower Sealink U.K. Limited to construct works and to acquire lands; to confer further powers on the Board and on that company; and for other purposes.
United Reformed Church Act 1981	1981 c. xxiv	27 July 1981
An Act to make provision as to property held on behalf of the Re-formed Association of Churches of Christ in Great Britain and Ireland and its member churches, and for other purposes incidental to or consequential upon the unification of the Re-formed Association of Churches of Christ in Great Britain and Ireland with the United Reformed Church in England and Wales; and to amend in certain respects the United Reformed Church Act 1972, (Note: United Reformed Church Act 1972 (c. xviii)) the Baptist and Congregational Trusts Act 1951 (Note: Baptist and Congregational Trusts Act 1951 (14 & 15 Geo. 6. c. xvii)) and other enactments.
East Sussex Act 1981	1981 c. xxv	27 July 1981
An Act to re-enact with amendments and to extend certain local statutory provisions in force within the county of East Sussex; to confer further powers on the East Sussex County Council and local authorities in the county; to make further provision with respect to the local government, improvement and health of the county and those local authorities; to vest lands in the Hastings Borough Council; to amend the Ashdown Forest Act 1974; (Note: Ashdown Forest Act 1974 (c. xxi)) and for other purposes.
Milford Docks Act 1981	1981 c. xxvi	27 July 1981
An Act to authorise the Milford Docks Company to raise additional capital; to confer further powers on the Company; and for other purposes.
Northumbrian Water Authority Act 1981	1981 c. xxvii	27 July 1981
An Act to confer powers on the Northumbrian Water Authority for the performance of their functions under the Water Act 1973; (Note: Water Act 1973 (c. 37)) to authorise the sale of electricity generated at Kielder Water; to make provision with respect to exceptions from licensing control under the Water Resources Act 1963; (Note: Water Resources Act 1963 (c. 38)) to apply provisions of the Third Schedule to the Water Act 1945 (Note: Water Act 1945 (8 & 9 Geo. 6. c. 42)) to the water undertaking of the Authority; to extend section 129 of the Town and Country Planning Act 1971 (Note: Town and Country Planning Act 1971 (c. 78)) in relation to the sewerage and sewage disposal functions of the Authority; and for other purposes.
Greater London Council (Money) Act 1981	1981 c. xxviii	28 July 1981
An Act to regulate prescribed expenditure and expenditure on lending to other persons by the Greater London Council, including prescribed expenditure of the London Transport Executive and their wholly-owned subsidiaries which is to be treated as prescribed expenditure of the Greater London Council, during the financial period from 1st April 1981 to 30th September 1982; and for other purposes.
Ullapool Pier Order Confirmation Act 1981	1981 c. xxix	31 July 1981
An Act to confirm a Provisional Order under the Private Legislation Procedure (Scotland) Act 1936, relating to Ullapool Pier.
	Ullapool Pier Order 1981 Provisional Order to extend the limits of jurisdiction of the Ullapool Pier Trustees.	
Great Yarmouth Borough Council Act 1981	1981 c. xxx	31 July 1981
An Act to confer powers on the Great Yarmouth Borough Council with respect to the registration of premises used for the sale of certain articles by way of competitive bidding; to make provision with respect to certain lands on the west bank of the river Yare in the borough; and for other purposes.
British Transport Docks Act 1981	1981 c. xxxi	30 October 1981
An Act to empower the British Transport Docks Board to construct works and to acquire lands; to extend the time for the compulsory purchase of certain lands; to confer further powers on the Board; and for other purposes.
London Transport Act 1981	1981 c. xxxii	30 October 1981
An Act to empower the London Transport Executive to construct works and to acquire lands; to confer further powers on the Executive; and for other purposes.
Midlothian District Council Order Confirmation Act 1981 (repealed)	1981 c. xxxiii	22 December 1981
An Act to confirm a Provisional Order under the Private Legislation Procedure (Scotland) Act 1936, relating to Midlothian District Council. (Repealed by Statute Law (Repeals) Act 1995 (c. 44))
	Midlothian District Council Order 1981 Provisional Order to confer powers on the Midlothian District Council with respect to stray dogs; and for other purposes.	
Derbyshire Act 1981	1981 c. xxxiv	22 December 1981
An Act to re-enact with amendments certain local enactments in force within the county of Derbyshire; to confer further powers on the local authorities in the county and to make further provision for the local government thereof; and for purposes connected with the matters aforesaid.
British Railways (No. 2) Act 1981	1981 c. xxxv	22 December 1981
An Act to empower the British Railways Board to construct works and to acquire lands; to empower Sealink U.K. Limited to construct works and to acquire lands; to confer further powers on the Board; and for other purposes.

== See also ==
- List of acts of the Parliament of the United Kingdom
