= English Industrial Estates Corporation Act 1981 =

Act of the Parliament of the United Kingdom

English Industrial Estates Corporation Act 1981 (Note: Section 10(1).)
- Act of Parliament
- Parliament of the United Kingdom
- Long title: An Act to consolidate the law relating to the English Industrial Estates Corporation.
- Citation: 1981 c. 13
- Territorial extent: England and Wales (Note: Section 10(3)–(4). Section 9(2) and, to the extent that the provisions there repealed extend to Scotland, section 9(4) and schedule 2, also extend to Scotland.)

Dates
- Royal assent: 15 April 1981
- Commencement: 15 May 1981 (Note: Section 10(2).)
- Repealed: 1 April 1994 (Note: The Leasehold Reform, Housing and Urban Development Act 1993 (Commencement No. 4) Order 1994 (SI 1994/935).)

Other legislation
- Amends: See § Repealed enactments
- Repeals/revokes: See § Repealed enactments
- Amended by: Industrial Development Act 1982
- Repealed by: Leasehold Reform, Housing and Urban Development Act 1993

Status: Repealed

Text of statute as originally enacted

Revised text of statute as amended

The English Industrial Estates Corporation Act 1981 (c. 13) was an act of the Parliament of the United Kingdom that consolidated enactments relating to the English Industrial Estates Corporation in England.

== Provisions ==
=== Repealed enactments ===
Section 9(4) of the act repealed 3 enactments, listed in schedule 2 to the act.

Enactments repealed by section 9(4)
Citation	Short title	Extent of repeal
1972 c. 5	Local Employment Act 1972	Section 10.
1972 c. 5	Local Employment Act 1972	In section 11, subsections (4) and (5) and (8) to (10).
1972 c. 5	Local Employment Act 1972	Section 12.
1972 c. 5	Local Employment Act 1972	In section 21(1), the definition of "industrial estates corporation".
1972 c. 5	Local Employment Act 1972	Schedule 1.
1972 c. 63	Industry Act 1972	In section 13, subsections (7) and (8).
1980 c. 33	Industry Act 1980	Sections 10 to 15.

== Subsequent developments ==
The whole act was repealed by section 187(2) of, and schedule 22 to, the Leasehold Reform, Housing and Urban Development Act 1993, which came into force on 1 April 1994.
