= Compulsory Purchase Act 1965 =

Act of the Parliament of the United Kingdom

Compulsory Purchase Act 1965 (Note: Section 40(1).)
- Act of Parliament
- Parliament of the United Kingdom
- Long title: An Act to consolidate the Lands Clauses Acts as applied by Part I of Schedule 2 to the Acquisition of Land (Authorisation Procedure) Act 1946, and by certain other enactments, and to repeal certain provisions in the Lands Clauses Acts and related enactments which have ceased to have any effect.
- Citation: 1965 c. 56
- Territorial extent: England and Wales (Note: Section 40(3).)

Dates
- Royal assent: 5 August 1965
- Commencement: 1 January 1966 (Note: Section 40(2).)

Other legislation
- Amends: Railways Clauses Consolidation Act 1845; See § Repealed enactments
- Repeals/revokes: See § Repealed enactments
- Amended by: General Rate Act 1967; Town and Country Planning Act 1971; Statute Law (Repeals) Act 1973; Statute Law (Repeals) Act 1974; Salmon and Freshwater Fisheries Act 1975; Airports Authority Act 1975; Statute Law (Repeals) Act 1978; Highways Act 1980; Acquisition of Land Act 1981; Civil Aviation Act 1982; Mental Capacity Act 2005

Status: Amended

Text of statute as originally enacted

Revised text of statute as amended

Text of the Compulsory Purchase Act 1965 as in force today (including any amendments) within the United Kingdom, from legislation.gov.uk.

The Compulsory Purchase Act 1965 (c. 56) is an act of the Parliament of the United Kingdom, which concerns the English land law and compulsory purchase.

== Contents ==
The act sets conditions for a compulsory purchase to be made.

== Provisions ==
=== Repealed enactments ===
Section 39(4) of the act repealed 17 enactments, listed in parts I, II and III of schedule 8 to the act.

Part I - enactments consolidated
Citation	Short title	Extent of repeal
9 & 10 Geo. 5. c. 59	Land Settlement (Facilities) Act 1919	Section 12(3).
16 & 17 Geo. 5. c. 52	Small Holdings and Allotments Act 1926	Section 17(1).
8 & 9 Geo. 6. c. 42	Water Act 1945	In Schedule 2, in paragraph 1, sub-paragraph (a) and (b), and in paragraph 2 the words "the Lands Clauses Acts and" and sub-paragraph (b).
9 & 10 Geo. 6. c. 49	Acquisition of Land (Authorisation Procedure) Act 1946	In section 1(3), the words "Lands Clauses Acts and other" and the words "I and" in both places. In Schedule 2, Part I except for paragraph 1(a) as applied by paragraph 7(2) of that Schedule. In Schedule 4, in the entry amending the Land Settlement Facilities Act 1919 the words "In section 12, subsection (3) shall not apply to land purchased compulsorily".
11 & 12 Geo. 6. c. 22	Water Act 1948	In the Schedule, in paragraph 1, the words from the beginning to "those Acts and", the words "I and" and the proviso, and paragraph 8(2).
5 & 6 Eliz. 2. c. 56	Housing Act 1957	In Schedule 1, paragraph 1(2). In Schedule 3, paragraph 7(1)(a) and sub-paragraphs (1) to (4), (6) and (8) of paragraph 8, and paragraph 9. In Schedule 7, paragraph 1(2).
10 & 11 Eliz. 2. c. 38	Town and Country Planning Act 1962	In section 75(7), the words from "by the Second" to "1946 and". In section 86(6) the words from "(notwithstanding" to "1946)". In Schedule 4, paragraph 6(3).
10 & 11 Eliz. 2. c. 58	Pipe-lines Act 1962	In Schedule 3, paragraphs 1 and 2.
1963 c. 38	Water Resources Act 1963	In Schedule 8, paragraph 12(1)(2)(3).
1964 c. 56	Housing Act 1964	Section 59(3).

Part II - spent provisions in the Lands Clauses Consolidation Act 1845 (8 & 9 Vict. c. 18)
Citation	Short title	Extent of repeal
8 & 9 Vict. c. 18	Lands Clauses Consolidation Act 1845	In section 7 the words from "married women" where they first occur to "idiots" where that word first occurs, the words "any estate in dower or to", the words "for life, or for lives and years, or", the words "married women entitled to dower or", the words "for life or for lives and years or", the words from "and as to such married women" to the word "disability" (before the words "and as to such trustees").
8 & 9 Vict. c. 18	Lands Clauses Consolidation Act 1845	In section 8 the words from the beginning to "as well as" and the word "other".
8 & 9 Vict. c. 18	Lands Clauses Consolidation Act 1845	In section 69 the words from "married woman" to "idiot".
8 & 9 Vict. c. 18	Lands Clauses Consolidation Act 1845	In section 70 the words from first "three" to "annuities or in".
8 & 9 Vict. c. 18	Lands Clauses Consolidation Act 1845	In section 71 the words "coverture, infancy, lunacy or other" and the words "husbands, guardians, committees or".
8 & 9 Vict. c. 18	Lands Clauses Consolidation Act 1845	In section 72 the words "coverture, infancy, idiocy, or other" and the words "husbands, guardians, committees or".
8 & 9 Vict. c. 18	Lands Clauses Consolidation Act 1845	In section 74 the words from first "a life" to "lives and".
8 & 9 Vict. c. 18	Lands Clauses Consolidation Act 1845	In section 77 the words from "the Cashier" to "been paid in and".
8 & 9 Vict. c. 18	Lands Clauses Consolidation Act 1845	In section 81 the words from "to merge" to "conveyed and" and the words from "but although" to the end of the section.
8 & 9 Vict. c. 18	Lands Clauses Consolidation Act 1845	In section 87 the words "bank annuities or".
8 & 9 Vict. c. 18	Lands Clauses Consolidation Act 1845	Section 88.
8 & 9 Vict. c. 18	Lands Clauses Consolidation Act 1845	The enacting words prefacing sections 95 to 98, and those sections.
8 & 9 Vict. c. 18	Lands Clauses Consolidation Act 1845	In the enacting words prefacing sections 115 to 118 the words "or chief or other rent".
8 & 9 Vict. c. 18	Lands Clauses Consolidation Act 1845	In section 116 the words "chief or other rent".
8 & 9 Vict. c. 18	Lands Clauses Consolidation Act 1845	In section 117 the words "chief or other rent".
8 & 9 Vict. c. 18	Lands Clauses Consolidation Act 1845	Section 139.
8 & 9 Vict. c. 18	Lands Clauses Consolidation Act 1845	Section 143.
8 & 9 Vict. c. 18	Lands Clauses Consolidation Act 1845	Section 147.

Part III - provisions superseded by Lands Tribunal Act 1949 (12, 13 & 14 Geo. 6. c. 42) and Land Compensation Act 1961 (9 & 10 Eliz. 2. c. 33)
Citation	Short title	Extent of repeal
8 & 9 Vict. c. 18	Lands Clauses Consolidation Act 1845	In section 21 the word "hereinafter".
8 & 9 Vict. c. 18	Lands Clauses Consolidation Act 1845	Section 22 except as applied by section 30 of the Railways Clauses Consolidation Act 1845.
8 & 9 Vict. c. 18	Lands Clauses Consolidation Act 1845	Sections 23 to 57.
8 & 9 Vict. c. 18	Lands Clauses Consolidation Act 1845	In section 58 the words from "or who shall" to "notice thereof" and the words from "as two" to the end of the section.
8 & 9 Vict. c. 18	Lands Clauses Consolidation Act 1845	In section 59 from the beginning to "as aforesaid and".
8 & 9 Vict. c. 18	Lands Clauses Consolidation Act 1845	In section 68 the words "and if the compensation claimed in such case shall exceed the sum of fifty pounds" and the words from "either" to the end of the section.
8 & 9 Vict. c. 18	Lands Clauses Consolidation Act 1845	In section 76 the words "or fail to appear on the inquiry before a jury as herein provided for".
8 & 9 Vict. c. 18	Lands Clauses Consolidation Act 1845	In section 106 the words from "to be appointed" to the end of the section.
8 & 9 Vict. c. 18	Lands Clauses Consolidation Act 1845	In section 121 the words from "and the amount" to "differ about the same".
8 & 9 Vict. c. 18	Lands Clauses Consolidation Act 1845	Section 145.
10 & 11 Vict. c. 27	Harbours, Docks and Piers Clauses Act 1847	In section 6 the words from "and except where" to "provided by", the words from "for determining" to "last mentioned Acts" and the words "and to enforcing the payment or other satisfaction thereof".
46 & 47 Vict. c. 15	Lands Clauses (Umpire) Act 1883	The whole act.
58 & 59 Vict. c. 11	Lands Clauses (Taxation of Costs) Act 1895	The whole act.
12, 13 & 14 Geo. 6. c. 27	Juries Act 1949	Section 12.
12, 13 & 14 Geo. 6. c. 27	Juries Act 1949	In section 18(1) proviso (a).
12, 13 & 14 Geo. 6. c. 42	Lands Tribunal Act 1949	In section 1, in subsection (3)(c) the words "on an acquisition by any such authority", and in subsection (6) the words from "instead of" to "therewith".

== See also ==
- Compulsory purchase order
- English land law
- Eminent domain
- Re Ellenborough Park [1955] EWCA Civ 4, [1956] Ch 131
