= Whitley Bay Pier =

Was to be built on north-east England, proposed in 1908, 1935-39, 1966-72, never built

Coordinates: 55.04435°N 1.43994°W

Whitley Bay Pier was an unrealised pleasure pier to be built at Whitley Bay, North Tyneside, on the north-east coast of England. Substantial proposals for such a pier were first made in 1908; next in 1935-39 and lastly in 1966–72. Although orders and local acts of Parliament permitting the development were repeatedly passed, construction of the various schemes never started.

== History ==
Whitley Bay developed into a holiday resort in the late 18th- and early 19th-centuries; it was provided with a railway station in 1882, from which an Esplanade road lead to a sea-front Promenade. Discussing a 1908 pier proposal, the Evening Chronicle noted that the notion of a pier at Whitley bay had been 'heartily supported' by visitors to the town and had occupied the attention of public men. Although schemes had been promulgated, nothing definite or practical had arisen out of any of the projects.

== 1908 scheme ==
In 1908 a syndicate announced a forthcoming scheme to be put to the public, to raise funds for the construction of a promenade pier and pavilion. The proposers asserted that a local act of Parliament for the structure had received royal assent, and that architects – Messers White and Stephenson of Grey Street – and engineers – Mr Thomas Brewer Mather of Newcastle, known for his work on sea defences – had been appointed.

The scheme, costed at £30,000 and estimated to require a year of construction, was anticipated – if supported – to start construction in 1909. The pier was to be sited on the centre-line of Esplanade Road, and be 722 foot (220 m) long and 35 foot (11 m) wide, terminating in a timber jetty or boatlanding 50 foot (15 m) long and 100 foot (30 m) wide, so as to allow for the landing of passengers from small steamers or pleasure boats, and providing facilities for bathing and fishing clubs. This, together with the pier entrance would make a total length of 802 foot (244 m).

The first length of the pier, including a pavilion, would be 200 foot (61 m) long with a width of 120 foot (37 m). The second length would be 522 foot (159 m) long by 35 foot (11 m) wide giving access to a 120 foot (37 m) width section for a bandstand, shelters and tea room. At the end of the pier would be a pierrot stand and shelters.

The entire structure would be on cast-iron columns fixed into rock foundations, and braced with wrought iron rods and beams. The decking would be of pitch pine, 24 foot (7.3 m) above high water at ordinary spring tides, and with a depth of about 20 foot (6.1 m) at high water, ordinary spring tides.

The entrance to the pier would have an 85 feet frontage to the Esplanade, having offices, payboxes, and exit turnstiles. Buildings would be constructed in timber with copper roofs, spires and domes. A three-foot diameter clock will be included. Immediately to the right of the entrance would be a steel-framed wooden pavilion accommodating 1,500 people, with a verandah running around it at gallery level. The pavilion would be designed to be multifunctional, with a 39 foot (12 m) by 20 foot (6.1 m) wide stage having a 28 foot (8.5 m) proscenium, together with orchestra accommodation and band rooms, dressing rooms, scenery accommodation, &c.

The pavilion's gallery would be accessed by a staircase in a corner minaret, which would lead to a roof garden, and the pavilion would be surrounded by kiosks, shelters and public toilets. The main floor of the pavilion would be 76 foot (23 m) by 60 foot (18 m). The building would be heated, and it and the pier illuminated by electric lighting.

The 1908 scheme came to nothing and the promoting company, the Whitley Bay Pier Company, folded.

== 1935-39 scheme ==
Pier and Harbour Order (Whitley Bay) Confirmation Act 1936
- Act of Parliament
- Parliament of the United Kingdom
- Long title: An Act to confirm a Provisional Order made by the Minister of Transport under the General Pier and Harbour Act 1861 relating to Whitley Bay.
- Citation: 26 Geo. 5 & 1 Edw. 8. c. lxxxiv

Dates
- Royal assent: 31 July 1936

Other legislation
- Relates to: General Pier and Harbour Act 1861

Text of statute as originally enacted

A new scheme was promoted from 1935 onwards by North Eastern Piers Ltd, eventually fronted by John Herron, which secured the Whitley Bay Pier Order 1936 providing permission for its construction. Although the timescale for the 1936 Order was extended, the scheme was eventually terminated in September 1939 at the onset of World War II.

== 1966-72 scheme ==
Whitley Bay Pier Act 1966
- Act of Parliament
- Parliament of the United Kingdom
- Long title: An Act to empower North Eastern Piers Limited to construct works and to acquire lands; and for other purposes.
- Citation: 1966 c. xxxv

Dates
- Royal assent: 12 August 1966

Text of statute as originally enacted

Whitley Bay Pier (Extension of Time) Act 1972
- Act of Parliament
- Parliament of the United Kingdom
- Long title: An Act to extend the time for the commencement of the work authorised by the Whitley Bay Pier Act 1966; and for other purposes.
- Citation: 1972 c. xiii

Dates
- Royal assent: 12 June 1972

Text of statute as originally enacted

Herron revived his scheme in the 1960s, investing sufficiently to get royal assent for the Whitley Bay Pier Act 1966 (c. xxxv), and the Whitley Bay Pier (Extension of Time) Act 1972.

Herron envisaged a 1,000 foot (300 m) long structure anticipated to cost some £2,000,000. The centrepiece of this proposed pier was to have been a "telescopic" building with a sliding roof which could be adapted to suit the prevailing weather. Proposals extended to a bowling alley, archery facilities, miniature golf, amusements, chalets, shops, a floating jetty for steamers and boats, a yachting club; and provision for helicopters, hydroplanes and hovercraft. The shore frontage of the pier would incorporate a three-story building with casino, model railway and sun lounge, and an underground car park for 500 vehicles. The pier would include a theatre-cum-conference hall. In describing Herron's plans, The Journal noted that "the attitude of Whitley Bay Council towards a pier has always been cautious". Once again the plans came to nothing.
