= Airports Authority Act 1975 =

Act of the Parliament of the United Kingdom

Airports Authority Act 1975 (Note: Section 26(1).)
- Act of Parliament
- Parliament of the United Kingdom
- Long title: An Act to consolidate the Airports Authority Act 1965 and certain related enactments.
- Citation: 1975 c. 78
- Territorial extent: England and Wales; Scotland; (Note: Section 26(3).)

Dates
- Royal assent: 12 November 1975
- Commencement: 12 December 1975 (Note: Section 26(2).)
- Repealed: 1 April 1987 (Note: The Airports Act 1986 (Commencement No. 2) Order 1986 (SI 1986/1487).)
Other legislation
Amends	See § Repealed enactments
Repeals/revokes	See § Repealed enactments
Amended by	Land Drainage Act 1976; Rent Act 1977; Law Reform (Miscellaneous Provisions) (Scotland) Act 1980; Statute Law (Repeals) Act 1981Acquisition of Land Act 1981; Civil Aviation Act 1982; Aviation Security Act 1982; Public Health (Control of Disease) Act 1984; Building Act 1984
Repealed by	Airports Act 1986

Status: Repealed

Text of statute as originally enacted

The Airports Authority Act 1975 (c. 78) was an act of the Parliament of the United Kingdom that consolidated enactments relating to the British Airports Authority and the management of aerodromes in Great Britain.

== Provisions ==
=== Repealed enactments ===
Section 25(3) of the act repealed 17 enactments, listed in schedule 6 to the act.

Enactments repealed by section 25(3)
Citation	Short title	Extent of repeal
1965 c. 16	Airports Authority Act 1965	The whole act.
1965 c. 56	Compulsory Purchase Act 1965	In Schedule 6, the entry relating to the Airports Authority Act 1965.
1968 c. 13	National Loans Act 1968	In Schedule 1, the entries relating to the Airports Authority Act 1965.
1968 c. 61	Civil Aviation Act 1968	Sections 9 to 11.
1968 c. 61	Civil Aviation Act 1968	In section 12(2), the words from "and for the purposes" to the end of the subsection.
1968 c. 61	Civil Aviation Act 1968	In section 24, the words "the British Airports Authority and", the word "each", and the words "the Authority or, as the case may be,".
1968 c. 61	Civil Aviation Act 1968	Section 25.
1969 c. 48	Post Office Act 1969	In Schedule 4, paragraph 76.
1971 c. 75	Civil Aviation Act 1971	In Schedule 10, paragraphs 9 to 12.
1971 c. 78	Town and Country Planning Act 1971	In Schedule 23, the entries in Part II relating to the Airports Authority Act 1965.
1972 c. 8	Airports Authority Act 1972	The whole act.
1972 c. 11	Superannuation Act 1972	In Schedule 4, the entry relating to the Authority.
1972 c. 52	Town and Country Planning (Scotland) Act 1972	In Schedule 21, the entries in Part II relating to the Airports Authority Act 1965.
1972 c. 70	Local Government Act 1972	In Schedule 22, paragraph 23.
1973 c. 26	Land Compensation Act 1973	Section 21.
1973 c. 56	Land Compensation (Scotland) Act 1973	Section 19.
1973 c. 65	Local Government (Scotland) Act 1973	In Schedule 27, paragraphs 156 and 157.
1974 c. 8	Statutory Corporations (Financial Provisions) Act 1974	In Schedule 2, paragraph 5.
1974 c. 50	Road Traffic Act 1974	In Schedule 6, paragraph 3.
1975 c. 55	Statutory Corporations (Financial Provisions) Act 1975	In Schedule 2, the words "The British Airports Authority".
1975 c. 55	Statutory Corporations (Financial Provisions) Act 1975	In Schedule 4, paragraph 7.

== Subsequent developments ==
The whole act was repealed by section 83(5) of, and part I of schedule 6 to, the Airports Act 1986, which came into force on 1 April 1987.
