= Local Employment Act 1972 =

Act of the Parliament of the United Kingdom

Local Employment Act 1972 (Note: Section 23(1).)
- Act of Parliament
- Parliament of the United Kingdom
- Long title: An Act to consolidate, with certain exceptions, the provisions of the Local Employment Acts 1960 to 1971.
- Citation: 1972 c. 5
- Territorial extent: England and Wales; Scotland; (Note: Section 23(3).)

Dates
- Royal assent: 10 February 1972
- Commencement: 10 March 1972 (Note: Section 23(2).)
Other legislation
Amends	See § Repealed enactments
Amended by	Town and Country Planning (Scotland) Act 1972; Industry Act 1972; Employment And Training Act 1973; Statute Law (Repeals) Act 1978; Industry Act 1980; English Industrial Estates Corporation Act 1981; Derelict Land Act 1982; Industrial Development Act 1982; Housing and Building Control Act 1984; Planning (Consequential Provisions) Act 1990; Statute Law (Repeals) Act 1993

Status: Partially repealed

Text of statute as originally enacted

Revised text of statute as amended

Text of the Local Employment Act 1972 as in force today (including any amendments) within the United Kingdom, from legislation.gov.uk.

The Local Employment Act 1972 (c. 5) is an act of the Parliament of the United Kingdom that consolidated enactments relating to local employment in Great Britain.

== Provisions ==
=== Repealed enactments ===
Section 22(2) of the act repealed 7 enactments, listed in schedule 4 to the act.

Enactments repealed by section 22(2)
Citation	Short title	Extent of repeal
8 & 9 Eliz. 2. c. 18	Local Employment Act 1960	Section 1(1) and (5).
8 & 9 Eliz. 2. c. 18	Local Employment Act 1960	Section 2.
8 & 9 Eliz. 2. c. 18	Local Employment Act 1960	Section 3.
8 & 9 Eliz. 2. c. 18	Local Employment Act 1960	Section 4.
8 & 9 Eliz. 2. c. 18	Local Employment Act 1960	Sections 6 to 10.
8 & 9 Eliz. 2. c. 18	Local Employment Act 1960	Section 12(1) and (6).
8 & 9 Eliz. 2. c. 18	Local Employment Act 1960	Section 13.
8 & 9 Eliz. 2. c. 18	Local Employment Act 1960	Section 14(2) and (3).
8 & 9 Eliz. 2. c. 18	Local Employment Act 1960	Section 15.
8 & 9 Eliz. 2. c. 18	Local Employment Act 1960	Section 23.
8 & 9 Eliz. 2. c. 18	Local Employment Act 1960	Section 27.
8 & 9 Eliz. 2. c. 18	Local Employment Act 1960	Section 28(1) to (4) and (6) to (8).
8 & 9 Eliz. 2. c. 18	Local Employment Act 1960	Schedules 1, 2 and 3.
1965 c. 46	Highlands and Islands Development (Scotland) Act 1965	Section 5(5)(b).
1966 c. 34	Industrial Development Act 1966	Section 15.
1966 c. 34	Industrial Development Act 1966	Sections 18 and 19.
1966 c. 34	Industrial Development Act 1966	Section 20(1) to (5).
1966 c. 34	Industrial Development Act 1966	Section 21(1) to (4) and, in subsection (5), the words from the beginning to " effect, and ".
1966 c. 34	Industrial Development Act 1966	Section 31(2).
1966 c. 34	Industrial Development Act 1966	In Schedule 3, in Part II, the entries relating to the Local Employment Act 1960 except that relating to section 17.
1968 c. 14	Public Expenditure and Receipts Act 1968	Section 6.
1970 c. 7	Local Employment Act 1970	Sections 1 to 4.
1970 c. 7	Local Employment Act 1970	Section 6.
1970 c. 7	Local Employment Act 1970	Section 8(1).
1970 c. 7	Local Employment Act 1970	Section 9(2) and (4).
1970 c. 7	Local Employment Act 1970	The Schedule except as respects section 60 of the Landlord and Tenant Act 1954.
1971 c. 51	Investment and Building Grants Act 1971	Section 2.
1971 c. 51	Investment and Building Grants Act 1971	In section 3 the words from " and section 2 " onwards.
1971 c. 78	Town and Country Planning Act 1971	In Schedule 23 the entry relating to the Local Employment Act 1960.

== Subsequent developments ==
Sections 1, 5, 7, 9, 13, 14, 16 to 18, 20, 21(1) and 22(3) and (4) of, paragraphs 3, 4, 8, 9 and 10 of schedule 2 to, and schedule 3 (except the entries relating to the Industrial Development Act 1966 and the Finance Act 1970) to, the act were repealed by section 19(1) of, and schedule 3 to, the Industrial Development Act 1982, which came into force on 28 January 1983.
