= Town and Country Planning (Scotland) Act 1972 =

Act of the Parliament of the United Kingdom

Town and Country Planning (Scotland) Act 1972 (Note: Section 281(1).)
- Act of Parliament
- Parliament of the United Kingdom
- Long title: An Act to consolidate certain enactments relating to town and country planning in Scotland with amendments to give effect to recommendations of the Scottish Law Commission.
- Citation: 1972 c. 52
- Territorial extent: Scotland (Note: Section 281(3).)

Dates
- Royal assent: 27 July 1972
- Commencement: 27 August 1972 (Note: Section 280(1).)
- Repealed: 27 May 1997

Other legislation
- Amends: See § Repealed enactments
- Repeals/revokes: See § Repealed enactments
- Amended by: House of Commons Disqualification Act 1975; Airports Authority Act 1975; Refuse Disposal (Amenity) Act 1978; Ancient Monuments and Archaeological Areas Act 1979; Civil Aviation Act 1982; Industrial Development Act 1982; Statute Law (Repeals) Act 1986; Airports Act 1986; Debtors (Scotland) Act 1987; Coal Industry Act 1994
- Repealed by: Planning (Consequential Provisions) (Scotland) Act 1997
- Relates to: Town and Country Planning Act 1971

Status: Repealed

Text of statute as originally enacted

Revised text of statute as amended

The Town and Country Planning (Scotland) Act 1972 (c. 52) was an act of the Parliament of the United Kingdom that consolidated certain enactments relating to town and country planning in Scotland.

The Town and Country Planning Act 1971 made equivalent provision for England and Wales.

== Provisions ==
=== Repealed enactments ===
Section 277(2) of the act repealed 30 enactments, listed in schedule 23 to the act.

Citation	Short title	Extent of repeal
8 & 9 Geo. 6. c. 33	Town and Country Planning (Scotland) Act 1945	The whole act.
10 & 11 Geo. 6. c. 53	Town and Country Planning (Scotland) Act 1947	Sections 1 to 43.
10 & 11 Geo. 6. c. 53	Town and Country Planning (Scotland) Act 1947	Section 44(2).
10 & 11 Geo. 6. c. 53	Town and Country Planning (Scotland) Act 1947	Section 46 except subsection (8).
10 & 11 Geo. 6. c. 53	Town and Country Planning (Scotland) Act 1947	Sections 47 to 108.
10 & 11 Geo. 6. c. 53	Town and Country Planning (Scotland) Act 1947	Section 109(2) to (6).
10 & 11 Geo. 6. c. 53	Town and Country Planning (Scotland) Act 1947	Sections 110 to 112.
10 & 11 Geo. 6. c. 53	Town and Country Planning (Scotland) Act 1947	Section 113(2) to (4).
10 & 11 Geo. 6. c. 53	Town and Country Planning (Scotland) Act 1947	Schedules 1 to 7.
10 & 11 Geo. 6. c. 53	Town and Country Planning (Scotland) Act 1947	In Schedule 8, the entry relating to the Town and Country Planning (Scotland) Act 1945.
10 & 11 Geo. 6. c. 53	Town and Country Planning (Scotland) Act 1947	Schedules 9 to 11.
12 & 13 Geo. 6. c. 32	Special Roads Act 1949	Section 9(2) and (4).
12 & 13 Geo. 6. c. 67	Civil Aviation Act 1949	Section 30(5).
12 & 13 Geo. 6. c. 67	Civil Aviation Act 1949	In Schedule 4, paragraph 10(a).
14 Geo. 6. c. 39	Public Utilities Street Works Act 1950	In Schedule 5, the entry relating to the Town and Country Planning (Scotland) Act 1947.
14 & 15 Geo. 6. c. 19	Town and Country Planning (Amendment) Act 1951	The whole act.
14 & 15 Geo. 6. c. 160	Mineral Workings Act 1951	Section 31.
14 & 15 Geo. 6. c. 160	Mineral Workings Act 1951	Section 43(3).
1 & 2 Eliz. 2. c. 16	Town and Country Planning Act 1953	The whole act.
2 & 3 Eliz. 2. c. 73	Town and Country Planning (Scotland) Act 1954	Sections 1 to 54.
2 & 3 Eliz. 2. c. 73	Town and Country Planning (Scotland) Act 1954	Sections 56 to 68.
2 & 3 Eliz. 2. c. 73	Town and Country Planning (Scotland) Act 1954	Section 70.
2 & 3 Eliz. 2. c. 73	Town and Country Planning (Scotland) Act 1954	Schedules 1 to 9.
5 & 6 Eliz. 2. c. 20	House of Commons Disqualification Act 1957	In Schedule 1, in Part II, the words "A Planning Inquiry Commission constituted under Part VI of the Town and Country Planning (Scotland) Act 1969" and the words "A Joint Planning Inquiry Commission constituted under Part VI of the Town and Country Planning (Scotland) Act 1969".
7 & 8 Eliz. 2. c. 70	Town and Country Planning (Scotland) Act 1959	Sections 1 to 13.
7 & 8 Eliz. 2. c. 70	Town and Country Planning (Scotland) Act 1959	Sections 17 to 22.
7 & 8 Eliz. 2. c. 70	Town and Country Planning (Scotland) Act 1959	Sections 31 to 43.
7 & 8 Eliz. 2. c. 70	Town and Country Planning (Scotland) Act 1959	Section 49.
7 & 8 Eliz. 2. c. 70	Town and Country Planning (Scotland) Act 1959	Section 50 except subsection (4).
7 & 8 Eliz. 2. c. 70	Town and Country Planning (Scotland) Act 1959	Sections 51 to 53.
7 & 8 Eliz. 2. c. 70	Town and Country Planning (Scotland) Act 1959	Section 55, except subsections (1)(a) and (3).
7 & 8 Eliz. 2. c. 70	Town and Country Planning (Scotland) Act 1959	Schedules 1 to 3.
7 & 8 Eliz. 2. c. 70	Town and Country Planning (Scotland) Act 1959	Schedules 5 and 6.
7 & 8 Eliz. 2. c. 70	Town and Country Planning (Scotland) Act 1959	Schedule 7, except the entry relating to section 55 of the Town and Country Planning (Scotland) Act 1954.
7 & 8 Eliz. 2. c. 70	Town and Country Planning (Scotland) Act 1959	Schedules 8 and 9.
8 & 9 Eliz. 2. c. 18	Local Employment Act 1960	Sections 16 to 22.
8 & 9 Eliz. 2. c. 18	Local Employment Act 1960	Section 26(1) and (3).
8 & 9 Eliz. 2. c. 62	Caravan Sites and Control of Development Act 1960	Sections 21 and 22.
1963 c. 17	Town and Country Planning Act 1963	The whole act.
1965 c. 16	Airports Authority Act 1965	Section 17(7)(d).
1965 c. 33	Control of Office and Industrial Development Act 1965	The whole act.
1966 c. 4	Mines (Working Facilities and Support) Act 1966	In Schedule 2, paragraph 3.
1966 c. 34	Industrial Development Act 1966	Part III.
1966 c. 34	Industrial Development Act 1966	Section 31(3).
1966 c. 34	Industrial Development Act 1966	In Schedule 3, in Part II, the entry relating to section 17 of the Local Employment Act 1960, and Part III.
1966 c. 51	Local Government (Scotland) Act 1966	Section 8.
1967 c. 69	Civic Amenities Act 1967	Section 1.
1967 c. 69	Civic Amenities Act 1967	Section 3.
1967 c. 69	Civic Amenities Act 1967	Section 6.
1967 c. 69	Civic Amenities Act 1967	Section 8.
1967 c. 69	Civic Amenities Act 1967	Section 11.
1967 c. 69	Civic Amenities Act 1967	Part II except section 15(2).
1967 c. 69	Civic Amenities Act 1967	In section 28(1), paragraph (a) and, in paragraph (c), the words "section 6, section 14".
1967 c. 69	Civic Amenities Act 1967	In section 30(1), the definition of "the Scottish Planning Act of 1969".
1968 c. 13	National Loans Act 1968	Section 11.
1968 c. 41	Countryside Act 1968	Sections 25 and 26.
1969 c. 30	Town and Country Planning (Scotland) Act 1969	Sections 1 to 27.
1969 c. 30	Town and Country Planning (Scotland) Act 1969	Section 28 except paragraph (b).
1969 c. 30	Town and Country Planning (Scotland) Act 1969	Sections 29 to 31.
1969 c. 30	Town and Country Planning (Scotland) Act 1969	Sections 33 to 38.
1969 c. 30	Town and Country Planning (Scotland) Act 1969	Sections 40 to 57.
1969 c. 30	Town and Country Planning (Scotland) Act 1969	Sections 60 to 97.
1969 c. 30	Town and Country Planning (Scotland) Act 1969	Sections 99 to 101.
1969 c. 30	Town and Country Planning (Scotland) Act 1969	Section 102(a).
1969 c. 30	Town and Country Planning (Scotland) Act 1969	Section 105.
1969 c. 30	Town and Country Planning (Scotland) Act 1969	Section 107.
1969 c. 30	Town and Country Planning (Scotland) Act 1969	Section 108(2).
1969 c. 30	Town and Country Planning (Scotland) Act 1969	Schedules 1 to 9.
1969 c. 30	Town and Country Planning (Scotland) Act 1969	Schedule 10 except paragraph 11.
1969 c. 30	Town and Country Planning (Scotland) Act 1969	Schedule 11.
1969 c. 48	Post Office Act 1969	In Schedule 4, paragraphs 37, 42 and 92(3).
1969 c. 48	Post Office Act 1969	In Schedule 9, in paragraph 27, in each of sub-paragraphs (7), (9) and (15), the words from "In the application" to the end of the sub-paragraph.
1970 c. 43	Trees Act 1970	Section 1.
1971 c. 18	Land Commission (Dissolution) Act 1971	In Schedule 2, paragraphs 3 and 4 and Appendix B.
1971 c. 62	Tribunals and Inquiries Act 1971	In Schedule 3, the entries relating to the Town and Country Planning (Scotland) Act 1959 and the Town and Country Planning (Scotland) Act 1969.
1971 c. 75	Civil Aviation Act 1971	In section 14(9), in paragraph (c), the words from "and for" to the end of the paragraph, and paragraph (d).
1971 c. 75	Civil Aviation Act 1971	In Schedule 5, paragraph 9(3).
1972 c. 5	Local Employment Act 1972	In Schedule 3, the entry relating to the Local Employment Act 1960.
1972 c. 42	Town and Country Planning (Amendment) Act 1972	Sections 7(2) and 12(1)(b).

== Subsequent developments ==
The whole act was repealed by section 3(1) of, and schedule 1 to, the Planning (Consequential Provisions) (Scotland) Act 1997, which came into force on 27 May 1997.
