= Industry Act 1975 =

Act of the Parliament of the United Kingdom

Industry Act 1975 (Note: Section 39(1).)
- Act of Parliament
- Parliament of the United Kingdom
- Long title: An Act to establish a National Enterprise Board; to confer on the Secretary of State power to prohibit the passing to persons not resident in the United Kingdom of control of undertakings engaged in manufacturing industry, and power to acquire compulsorily the capital or assets of such undertakings where control has passed to such persons or there is a probability that it will pass; to amend the Industry Act 1972 and the Development of Inventions Act 1967; to make provision for the disclosure of information relating to manufacturing undertakings to the Secretary of State or the Minister of Agriculture, Fisheries and Food, and to trade unions; and for connected purposes.
- Citation: 1975 c. 68
- Introduced by: Secretary of State for Industry Tony Benn (Commons)
- Territorial extent: United Kingdom (Note: Section 39(4)–(5).)

Dates
- Royal assent: 12 November 1975
- Commencement: 20 November 1975 (Note: Section 39(6)–(7). The Industry Act 1975 (Commencement) Order 1975 (SI 1975/1881).)

Other legislation
- Amends: Development of Inventions Act 1967; Industry Act 1972
- Amended by: Industry Act 1980; Transfer of Functions (Minister for the Civil Service and Treasury) Order 1981; Industrial Development Act 1982; Co-operative Development Agency and Industrial Development Act 1984; Transfer of Functions (Economic Statistics) Order 1989; Courts and Legal Services Act 1990; British Technology Group Act 1991; Tribunals and Inquiries Act 1992; Judicial Pensions and Retirement Act 1993; Arbitration Act 1996; Industry Act 1975 (Prohibition and Vesting Order) Regulations 1998; Constitutional Reform Act 2005; Enterprise Act 2002 (Disqualification from Office: General) Order 2006; Tribunals, Courts and Enforcement Act 2007; Companies Act 2006 (Consequential Amendments, Transitional Provisions and Savings) Order 2009; Budget Responsibility and National Audit Act 2011; Tribunals, Courts and Enforcement Act 2007 (Consequential Amendments) Order 2012; Public Service Pensions and Judicial Offices Act 2022

Status: Amended

Text of statute as originally enacted

Revised text of statute as amended

Text of the Industry Act 1975 as in force today (including any amendments) within the United Kingdom, from legislation.gov.uk.

The Industry Act 1975 (c. 68) is an act of the Parliament of the United Kingdom passed by Harold Wilson's Labour government. The main purpose of the act was to establish the National Enterprise Board (NEB).

== Background ==
The Labour Party manifesto for the October 1974 general election stated:

A new and urgent Industry Act will provide for a system of Planning Agreements between the Government and key companies to ensure that the plans of those companies are in harmony with national needs and objectives and that Government financial assistance is deployed where it will be most effectively used. Wherever we give direct aid to a company out of public funds we shall reserve the right to take a proportionate share of the ownership of the company; and wherever possible this public support will be channelled through the Planning Agreements System.

These ideas were inspired by the writings of the socialist economist Stuart Holland and gave impetus to the growing desire amongst Labour's left-wing to fulfil the promise contained in Clause IV of the Party's constitution for social ownership of the economy.
