= Development of Inventions Act 1967 =

Act of the Parliament of the United Kingdom

Development of Inventions Act 1967 (Note: Section 15(1).)
- Act of Parliament
- Parliament of the United Kingdom
- Long title: An Act to consolidate the Development of Inventions Act 1948, the Development of Inventions Act 1954 and the Development of Inventions Act 1965.
- Citation: 1967 c. 32
- Territorial extent: United Kingdom

Dates
- Royal assent: 10 May 1967
- Commencement: 10 June 1967 (Note: Section 15(8).)
Other legislation
Amends	See § Repealed enactments
Repeals/revokes	See § Repealed enactments
Amended by	Industrial Expansion Act 1968; Secretary of State for Trade and Industry Order 1970; Northern Ireland Constitution Act 1973; Industry Act 1975; Statute Law (Repeals) Act 1989; British Technology Group Act 1991

Status: Partially repealed

Text of statute as originally enacted

Revised text of statute as amended

Text of the Development of Inventions Act 1967 as in force today (including any amendments) within the United Kingdom, from legislation.gov.uk.

The Development of Inventions Act 1967 (c. 32) is an act of the Parliament of the United Kingdom that consolidated enactments related to the development and exploitation of inventions in the United Kingdom.

== Provisions ==
=== Repealed enactments ===
Section 15(3) of the act repealed 3 enactments, listed in that section.

Enactments repealed by section 15(3)
Citation	Short title	Extent of repeal
11 & 12 Geo. 6. c. 60	Development of Inventions Act 1948	The whole act.
2 & 3 Eliz. 2. c. 20	Development of Inventions Act 1954	The whole act.
1965 c. 21	Development of Inventions Act 1965	The whole act.

== Subsequent developments ==
The act was amended by Part III of the Industry Act 1975, which modified the financial provisions relating to the National Research Development Corporation.

Sections 2 to 13, section 15(3) to (8), and paragraphs 4 to 8 of the schedule to the act were repealed by section 17(2) of, and part I of schedule 2 to, the British Technology Group Act 1991, which came into force on 6 January 1992. The remaining provisions of the act — section 1, section 15(1) and (2), and the schedule so far as unrepealed — are to be repealed on the dissolution of the National Research Development Corporation by section 17(2) of, and part II of schedule 2 to, the British Technology Group Act 1991.
