= Leo Pliatzky =

English civil servant (1919–1999)

Sir Leo Pliatzky KCB (22 August 1919 – 4 May 1999) was an English civil servant whose career spanned 1947–77, 27 of those years in HM Treasury. He served as Joint Permanent Secretary to the Department of Trade and Industry in 1967–77.

== Early life and education ==
Pliatzky was born at 44 Regent Road in Salford, Lancashire, the second son of Jewish emigrants Nathan Pliatzky, a shopkeeper and clothier from Saint Petersburg, and Rose Rebecca Portnoy, from Latvia. He grew up in Manchester, where he was an outstanding scholar at Manchester Grammar School, until the 1930s, when his parents, struggling financially in the Great Depression, moved to Bow, London. Rising anti-Semitism stoked by British fascists like Oswald Mosley led to his parents changing their surname to Green, but young Leo refused.

Harold Laski, an alumnus of Manchester Grammar School who was a rising figure in the Labour Party, knew of Leo Pliatzky's academic potential and paid for him to attend the City of London School. In 1937, he earned an open scholarship to Corpus Christi College, Oxford, where he was active in the Oxford University Labour Club and took first-class honours in classical moderations in 1939.

During the Second World War, he served in North Africa and Italy with the Royal Army Ordnance Corps and the Royal Electrical and Mechanical Engineers, where he was mentioned in despatches and promoted to lieutenant. In 1945–46, he returned to Oxford and took another degree in philosophy, politics and economics, again with first-class honours.

== Career ==
Following the war, Pliatzky worked briefly as research secretary with the Fabian Society before beginning his career in the civil service. He first served in the Ministry of Food (1947–50) before joining HM Treasury.

In 1953, he was transferred to the overseas finance division and spent the next 13 years dealt with "uncertain balance of payments amid competing calls on Britain's resources diminished by war and strained by a nascent welfare state, the ending of empire, and the cold war." Pliatzky established strong personal relations with the World Bank and other international financial institutions.

He served as Undersecretary (1967–71), Deputy Secretary (1971–76), and then Second Secretary (1976–77), and served as Joint Permanent Secretary to the Department of Trade and Industry (1976–77).

According to Joel Barnett, Chief Secretary to the Treasury from 1974–79, "Sir Leo was a Keynesian who believed that the division of labour worked out at the centre of Whitehall in the 1950s was as close to administrative perfection as we are likely to get."

Pliatzky was known for his honest and forthright approach, which could be seen as abrasive. "He spoke his mind freely, whether to ministers, fellow senior officials, junior officials, businessmen, industrialists, indeed anyone with whom he had discussions," Barnett said.

== Honours ==
Pliatzky was appointed a Companion of the Order of the Bath (CB) in 1972 and knighted in the same order (KCB) in 1977.

== Personal life ==
In 1948, he married Marian Jean Elias (died 1979), whom he met at Oxford after the war. They had one son and one daughter. He died in Congresbury, Somerset, in 1999, aged 79.

== Bibliography ==
- Pliatzky, Leo (1982). Getting and Spending: Public Expenditure, Employment, and Inflation. Blackwell. ISBN 0-631-13589-8.
