= Town and Country Planning Act 1971 =

Act of the Parliament of the United Kingdom

Town and Country Planning Act 1971 (Note: Section 295(1).)
- Act of Parliament
- Parliament of the United Kingdom
- Long title: An Act to consolidate certain enactments relating to town and country planning in England and Wales with amendments to give effect to recommendations of the Law Commission.
- Citation: 1971 c. 78
- Territorial extent: England and Wales (Note: Section 295(2).)

Dates
- Royal assent: 28 October 1971
- Commencement: 1 April 1972 (Note: Section 294(1).)
- Repealed: 24 August 1990
Other legislation
Amends	Land Compensation Act 1961; See § Repealed enactments
Repeals/revokes	See § Repealed enactments
Amended by	Local Employment Act 1972; Industry Act 1972; Statute Law (Repeals) Act 1975; House of Commons Disqualification Act 1975; Airports Authority Act 1975; Town and Country Planning (Amendment) Act 1977; Statute Law (Repeals) Act 1977; Administration of Justice Act 1977; Refuse Disposal (Amenity) Act 1978; Ancient Monuments and Archaeological Areas Act 1979; Highways Act 1980; New Towns Act 1981; Acquisition of Land Act 1981; Civil Aviation Act 1982; National Heritage Act 1983; Road Traffic Regulation Act 1984; Airports Act 1986; Coal Industry Act 1987
Repealed by	Planning (Consequential Provisions) Act 1990

Status: Repealed

Text of statute as originally enacted

The Town and Country Planning Act 1971 (c. 78) was an act of the Parliament of the United Kingdom that consolidated enactments relating to town and country planning in England and Wales.

== Provisions ==
=== Repealed enactments ===
Section 292(2) of the act repealed 26 enactments, listed in the twenty-fifth schedule to the act.

Citation	Short title	Extent of repeal
5 & 6 Eliz. 2. c. 20	House of Commons Disqualification Act 1957	In Schedule 1, in Part II, the words "A Planning Inquiry Commission constituted under Part VI of the Town and Country Planning Act 1968."
10 & 11 Eliz. 2. c. 38	Town and Country Planning Act 1962	The whole act except sections 222, 224 and 226 and Schedule 12.
1963 c. 17	Town and Country Planning Act 1963	Section 1; section 3; section 4(1) to (3); the Schedule.
1963 c. 29	Local Authorities (Land) Act 1963	Section 12(2).
1963 c. 33	London Government Act 1963	Sections 24 to 29.
1963 c. 38	Water Resources Act 1963	In section 71(5) the words "and in the Town and Country Planning Act 1962".
1964 c. 51	Universities and College Estates Act 1964	In Schedule 3, in Part II, the entry relating to the Town and Country Planning Act 1962.
1965 c. 33	Control of Office and Industrial Development Act 1965	Sections 1 to 16; sections 18 to 20; section 22(1); sections 23 and 24; section 25(1) to (4); in section 26(2), the words from the beginning to "1962 to 1965; and"; schedules 1 to 3.
1965 c. 56	Compulsory Purchase Act 1965	In Schedule 6, the entry relating to the Town and Country Planning Act 1962; in Schedule 7, the entry relating to the Town and Country Planning Act 1962.
1966 c. 4	Mines (Working Facilities and Support) Act 1966	In Schedule 2, paragraph 3.
1966 c. 34	Industrial Development Act 1966	Part III; in section 31(3), the words from "together with the Town and Country Planning Acts 1962 to 1965" to "1962 to 1966 and"; in Schedule 3, in Part III, the entry relating to the Town and Country Planning Act 1962.
1966 c. 42	Local Government Act 1966	Section 7.
1967 c. 69	Civic Amenities Act 1967	Section 1; section 3; section 6; section 8; section 11; Part II except section 15(2); in section 28(1), paragraph (a) and, in paragraph (c), the words "section 6, section 14"; in section 30(1), the definition of "the Planning Act of 1968".
1968 c. 13	National Loans Act 1968	Section 11.
1968 c. 23	Rent Act 1968	In Schedule 15, the entry relating to the Town and Country Planning Act 1962.
1968 c. 41	Countryside Act 1968	Sections 25 and 26.
1968 c. 72	Town and Country Planning Act 1968	Sections 1 to 26; section 27 except paragraph (b); sections 28 and 29; sections 32 to 38; sections 40 to 57; sections 60 to 87; sections 90 to 98; sections 100 to 102; section 103(a); in section 104(1), the definition of "the Greater London development plan" and subsections (2) and (4); section 108; section 109(2); schedules 1 and 2; schedules 4 to 8; schedule 9 except paragraphs 9, 10, 68 and 75; schedule 10 except paragraphs 13 and 14; schedule 11.
1969 c. 33	Housing Act 1969	Section 34.
1969 c. 48	Post Office Act 1969	In Schedule 4, paragraphs 71 and 89(3).
1970 c. 43	Trees Act 1970	Section 1.
1970 c. 57	Town and Country Planning Regulations (London) (Indemnity) Act 1970	Section 2.
1971 c. 18	Land Commission (Dissolution) Act 1971	In Schedule 2, paragraph 1.
1971 c. 23	Courts Act 1971	In Schedule 9, the entries relating to the Town and Country Planning Act 1962 and the Town and Country Planning Act 1968.
1971 c. 41	Highways Act 1971	Section 50; section 77; section 78(2); schedule 7.
1971 c. 62	Tribunals and Inquiries Act 1971	In Schedule 3, the entries relating to the Town and Country Planning Act 1962 and the Town and Country Planning Act 1968.
1971 c. 75	Civil Aviation Act 1971	In Schedule 5, paragraph 8(3).

== Subsequent developments ==
The whole act was repealed by section 3(1) of, and part I of schedule 1 to, the Planning (Consequential Provisions) Act 1990, which came into force on 24 August 1990.
