= List of acts of the Parliament of the United Kingdom from 1972 =

This is a list of acts of the Parliament of the United Kingdom passed in 1972.

Acts passed since 1963 are cited by calendar year, as opposed to the convention used for earlier acts of citing the regnal year(s) in which the relevant parliamentary session was held. Each act passed in a respective year is given a chapter number (abbreviated "c."), denoted by Arabic numerals in the case of public general acts, lowercase Roman numerals in the case of local acts, or italicised Arabic numerals in the case of personal acts. These run as separate series.

134 acts of Parliament were passed in 1972: 80 public general acts, 53 local acts and 1 personal act.

indicates that an act has been transcribed on Wikisource, indicates that an act is available to view at legislation.gov.uk, and indicates the location of the original act in the Parliamentary Archives.

== Public general acts ==
Short title	Citation	Royal assent
Long title
Sierra Leone Republic Act 1972	1972 c. 1	10 February 1972
An Act to make provision as to the operation of the law in relation to Sierra Leone as a republic within the Commonwealth.
Island of Rockall Act 1972	1972 c. 2	10 February 1972
An Act to make provision for the incorporation of that part of Her Majesty's Dominions known as the Island of Rockall into that part of the United Kingdom known as Scotland, and for purposes connected therewith.
Ministerial and other Salaries Act 1972 (repealed)	1972 c. 3	10 February 1972
An Act to make new provision as to the salaries payable to the holders of Ministerial and other offices, and for purposes connected therewith. (Repealed by Ministerial and other Salaries Act 1975 (c. 27))
National Insurance Regulations (Validation) Act 1972 (repealed)	1972 c. 4	10 February 1972
An Act to validate part of the National Insurance (Earnings-related Benefit) Regulations 1966. (Note: National Insurance (Earnings-related Benefit) Regulations 1966 (SI 1966/959)) (Repealed by National Insurance Act 1974 (c. 14))
Local Employment Act 1972	1972 c. 5	10 February 1972
An Act to consolidate, with certain exceptions, the provisions of the Local Employment Acts 1960 to 1971.
Summer Time Act 1972	1972 c. 6	10 February 1972
An Act to consolidate the enactments relating to summer time.
Civil List Act 1972	1972 c. 7	24 February 1972
An Act to make further provision for the honour and dignity of the Crown and the Royal Family, and for the payment of certain allowances and pensions.
Airports Authority Act 1972 (repealed)	1972 c. 8	24 February 1972
An Act to increase the statutory limit on the amounts outstanding in respect of borrowings by the British Airports Authority and to enable the Authority to borrow money in currencies other than sterling. (Repealed by Airports Authority Act 1975 (c. 78))
Mineral Exploration and Investment Grants Act 1972	1972 c. 9	24 February 1972
An Act to authorise the giving of financial assistance in connection with mineral exploration, and to clarify or extend certain exceptions from the abolition of investment grants.
Northern Ireland Act 1972	1972 c. 10	24 February 1972
An Act to declare the law as to the legislative powers of the Parliament of Northern Ireland under section 4(1) of the Government of Ireland Act 1920, (Note: Government of Ireland Act 1920 (10 & 11 Geo. 5. c. 67)) so far as relates to Her Majesty's forces and in particular to the conferment of powers, authorities, privileges or immunities on them.
Superannuation Act 1972	1972 c. 11	1 March 1972
An Act to amend the law relating to pensions and other similar benefits payable to or in respect of persons in certain employment; to provide for distribution without proof of title of certain sums due to or in respect of certain deceased persons; to abolish the Civil Service Committee for Northern Ireland; to repeal section 6 of the Appropriation Act 1957; (Note: Appropriation Act 1957 (5 & 6 Eliz. 2. c. 63)) and for purposes connected with the matters aforesaid.
Iron and Steel Act 1972 (repealed)	1972 c. 12	1 March 1972
An Act to make new provision with respect to the finances of the British Steel Corporation and to clarify the Corporation's powers and duties in respect of iron and steel activities. (Repealed by Iron and Steel Act 1975 (c. 64))
Consolidated Fund Act 1972 (repealed)	1972 c. 13	23 March 1972
An Act to apply certain sums out of the Consolidated Fund to the service of the years ending on 31st March 1971, 1972 and 1973. (Repealed by Appropriation (No. 2) Act 1974 (c. 31))
Transport Holding Company Act 1972	1972 c. 14	23 March 1972
An Act to make further provision with respect to the disposal of assets by, and the dissolution of, the Transport Holding Company, with respect to the making of grants to the company towards their expenses in disposing of assets or preparing for their dissolution, or towards discharging liabilities imposed on them under the provision so made, and with respect to pensions and compensation for loss of employment in respect of employees of bodies which cease to be subsidiaries of the company; and for purposes connected with those matters.
Transport (Grants) Act 1972 (repealed)	1972 c. 15	23 March 1972
An Act to authorise the Secretary of State to make grants to the British Railways Board and to the National Bus Company, and to make contributions to expenditure by the British Railways Board or their subsidiaries intended to promote employment. (Repealed by Transport Act 2000 (c. 38))
Harbours (Loans) Act 1972	1972 c. 16	23 March 1972
An Act to provide for loans to harbour authorities to enable them to pay certain debts; to provide for the payment to the Secretary of State of the amount of past loans made by him for that purpose to such authorities; to impose a limit on loans made for that purpose to harbour authorities, on such payments and on loans made under section 11 of the Harbours Act 1964, (Note: Harbours Act 1964 (c. 40)) in substitution for the existing limit on the latter; and for connected purposes.
Electricity Act 1972 (repealed)	1972 c. 17	23 March 1972
An Act to increase the statutory limits imposed on the amounts outstanding in respect of borrowings by the Electricity Council and Electricity Boards, to authorise contributions by the Secretary of State to expenditure intended to promote employment and to make further provision for the transfer of property between Electricity Boards. (Repealed by Electricity Act 1989 (c. 29))
Maintenance Orders (Reciprocal Enforcement) Act 1972	1972 c. 18	23 March 1972
An Act to make new provision, applying throughout the United Kingdom, in place of the Maintenance Orders (Facilities for Enforcement) Act 1920; (Note: Maintenance Orders (Facilities for Enforcement) Act 1920 (10 & 11 Geo. 5. c. 33)) to make provision with a view to the accession by the United Kingdom to the United Nations Convention on the Recovery Abroad of Maintenance (Note: Convention on the Recovery Abroad of Maintenance) done at New York on 20th June 1956; to make other provision for facilitating the recovery of maintenance by or from persons in the United Kingdom from or by persons in other countries; to extend the jurisdiction of magistrates' courts to hear complaints by or against persons outside England and Wales; and for purposes connected with the matters aforesaid.
Sunday Cinema Act 1972 (repealed)	1972 c. 19	30 March 1972
An Act to amend the Sunday Entertainments Act 1932. (Note: Sunday Entertainments Act 1932 (22 & 23 Geo. 5. c. 51)) (Repealed by Cinemas Act 1985 (c. 13))
Road Traffic Act 1972 (repealed)	1972 c. 20	30 March 1972
An Act to consolidate certain enactments relating to road traffic with amendments to give effect to recommendations of the Law Commission and the Scottish Law Commission. (Repealed by Road Traffic (Consequential Provisions) Act 1988 (c. 54))
Deposit of Poisonous Waste Act 1972	1972 c. 21	30 March 1972
An Act to penalise the depositing on land of poisonous, noxious or polluting waste so as to give rise to an environmental hazard, and to make offenders liable for any resultant damage; to require the giving of notices in connection with the removal and deposit of waste; and for connected purposes.
Northern Ireland (Temporary Provisions) Act 1972 (repealed)	1972 c. 22	30 March 1972
An Act to make temporary provision for the government of Northern Ireland, and for purposes connected therewith. (Repealed by Northern Ireland Act 1998 (c. 47))
Consolidated Fund (No. 2) Act 1972 (repealed)	1972 c. 23	11 May 1972
An Act to apply a sum out of the Consolidated Fund to the service of the year ending on 31st March 1973. (Repealed by Appropriation (No. 2) Act 1974 (c. 31))
Social Work (Scotland) Act 1972 (repealed)	1972 c. 24	11 May 1972
An Act to amend section 30 of the Social Work (Scotland) Act 1968. (Note: Social Work (Scotland) Act 1968 (c. 49)) (Repealed by Children (Scotland) Act 1995 (c. 36))
Betting and Gaming Duties Act 1972 (repealed)	1972 c. 25	11 May 1972
An Act to consolidate certain enactments concerning the duties of excise relating to betting and gaming. (Repealed by Betting and Gaming Duties Act 1981 (c. 63))
Sunday Theatre Act 1972 (repealed)	1972 c. 26	11 May 1972
An Act to permit and regulate the opening and use of theatres on Sundays, and for purposes connected therewith. (Repealed by Licensing Act 2003 (c. 17))
Road Traffic (Foreign Vehicles) Act 1972	1972 c. 27	11 May 1972
An Act to make provision, in relation to foreign goods vehicles and foreign public service vehicles, for securing the observance of certain statutory provisions relating to road traffic; and for purposes connected with those matters.
Employment Medical Advisory Service Act 1972	1972 c. 28	11 May 1972
An Act to provide for the establishment by the Secretary of State of an employment medical advisory service, to amend the Factories Act 1961 (Note: Factories Act 1961 (9 & 10 Eliz. 2. c. 34)) in relation to medical arrangements and related matters and in relation to the obstruction of inspectors, and for purposes connected therewith.
Harbours, Piers and Ferries (Scotland) Act 1972	1972 c. 29	12 June 1972
An Act to make provision for extending the power of the Secretary of State under section 7 of the Harbours, Piers and Ferries (Scotland) Act 1937 (Note: Harbours, Piers and Ferries (Scotland) Act 1937 (1 Edw. 8 & 1 Geo. 6. c. 28)) to authorise the undertaking by certain local and harbour authorities of operations in connection with marine works.
Civil Evidence Act 1972	1972 c. 30	12 June 1972
An Act to make, for civil proceedings in England and Wales, provision as to the admissibility in evidence of statements of opinion and the reception of expert evidence; and to facilitate proof in such proceedings of any law other than that of England and Wales.
Sound Broadcasting Act 1972 (repealed)	1972 c. 31	12 June 1972
An Act to extend the functions of the Independent Television Authority, renamed the Independent Broadcasting Authority, so as to include the provision of local sound broadcasting services, and to amend and supplement the Television Act 1964 (Note: Television Act 1964 (c. 21)) for the purpose of so extending the functions of the Authority; and for purposes connected with those matters. (Repealed by Independent Broadcasting Authority Act 1973 (c. 19))
Performers' Protection Act 1972 (repealed)	1972 c. 32	29 June 1972
An Act to amend the Performers' Protection Acts 1958 (Note: Performers' Protection Act 1958 (6 & 7 Eliz. 2. c. 44)) and 1963. (Note: Performers' Protection Act 1963 (c. 53)) (Repealed by Copyright, Designs and Patents Act 1988 (c. 48))
Carriage by Railway Act 1972	1972 c. 33	29 June 1972
An Act to amend the law relating to carriage by rail in connection with certain international conventions, and for purposes connected therewith.
Trade Descriptions Act 1972 (repealed)	1972 c. 34	29 June 1972
An Act to require certain names and marks applied to imported goods to be accompanied by an indication of origin. (Repealed by Consumer Protection Act 1987 (c. 43))
Defective Premises Act 1972	1972 c. 35	29 June 1972
An Act to impose duties in connection with the provision of dwellings and otherwise to amend the law of England and Wales as to liability for injury or damage caused to persons through defects in the state of premises.
National Insurance (Amendment) Act 1972	1972 c. 36	29 June 1972
An Act to amend the provisions of the National Insurance Acts 1965 to 1971 relating to the earnings rule for retirement pensions and to make parallel provision for Northern Ireland.
Salmon and Freshwater Fisheries Act 1972 (repealed)	1972 c. 37	29 June 1972
An Act to amend the law relating to the regulation and control of fishing for salmon, trout, freshwater fish and eels, the protection and conservation of fisheries for such fish, the times of fishing for and selling such fish and the enforcement of the provisions of that law; and for connected purposes. (Repealed by Salmon and Freshwater Fisheries Act 1975 (c. 51))
Matrimonial Proceedings (Polygamous Marriages) Act 1972	1972 c. 38	29 June 1972
An Act to enable matrimonial relief to be granted, and declarations concerning the validity of a marriage to be made, notwithstanding that the marriage in question was entered into under a law which permits polygamy, and to make a consequential amendment in the Nullity of Marriage Act 1971. (Note: Nullity of Marriage Act 1971 (c. 44))
Police Act 1972 (repealed)	1972 c. 39	29 June 1972
An Act to relax the prohibition on the Police Federation for England and Wales or the Police Federation for Scotland being associated with any body or person outside the police service. (Repealed by Police Act 1996 (c. 16))
Overseas Investment and Export Guarantees Act 1972 (repealed)	1972 c. 40	29 June 1972
An Act to authorise the Secretary of State to enter into certain agreements relating to overseas enterprises, and in particular to investment overseas, and to amend the Export Guarantees Act 1968. (Note: Export Guarantees Act 1968 (c. 26)) (Repealed by Overseas Development and Co-operation Act 1980 (c. 63))
Finance Act 1972	1972 c. 41	27 July 1972
An Act to grant certain duties, to alter other duties, and to amend the law relating to the National Debt and the Public Revenue, and to make further provision in connection with Finance.
Town and Country Planning (Amendment) Act 1972 (repealed)	1972 c. 42	27 July 1972
An Act to amend certain enactments relating to development plans, to extend the duration of and otherwise amend certain enactments relating to the control of office development, to make further provision for the service of building preservation notices and for controlling the demolition of buildings in conservation areas, and provision for the making of grants and loans in connection with the preservation or enhancement of the character or appearance of such areas, and for purposes connected with the matters aforesaid. (Repealed by Planning (Consequential Provisions) Act 1990 (c. 11))
Field Monuments Act 1972	1972 c. 43	27 July 1972
An Act to make provision for agreements for the protection of certain ancient monuments and consequential provision for payments under such agreements out of moneys provided by Parliament to occupiers of land which is the site of such a monument.
Children Act 1972	1972 c. 44	27 July 1972
An Act to secure that the minimum age at which children may be employed is not affected by any further change in the school-leaving age.
Trading Representations (Disabled Persons) Amendment Act 1972 (repealed)	1972 c. 45	27 July 1972
An Act to amend the Trading Representations (Disabled Persons) Act 1958. (Note: Trading Representations (Disabled Persons) Act 1958 (6 & 7 Eliz. 2. c. 49)) (Repealed by Consumer Protection from Unfair Trading Regulations 2008 (SI 2008/1277))
Housing (Financial Provisions) (Scotland) Act 1972	1972 c. 46	27 July 1972
An Act to introduce a new system of housing subsidies for housing authorities; to provide for rent rebate and rent allowance schemes administered by housing authorities; to make provision as to the housing accounts of local authorities; to amend the law about rents of houses and in particular those subject to the Rent (Scotland) Act 1971 (Note: Rent (Scotland) Act 1971 (c. 28)) or provided by housing authorities; and to make other provision as to housing finance.
Housing Finance Act 1972 (repealed)	1972 c. 47	27 July 1972
An Act to introduce a new system of housing subsidies for housing authorities, to provide for rent rebate and rent allowance schemes administered by housing authorities, to amend the law about rents of dwellings and in particular those subject to the Rent Act 1968 (Note: Rent Act 1968 (c. 23)) or provided by housing authorities, and to make other provision as to housing finance. (Repealed by Housing (Consequential Provisions) Act 1985 (c. 71))
Parliamentary and other Pensions Act 1972	1972 c. 48	27 July 1972
An Act to make further provision with respect to the contributory pensions scheme for Members of the House of Commons, and to establish a similar scheme for the holders of certain Ministerial and other offices; to make further provision with respect to pensions and related benefits payable to or in respect of persons who have been Prime Minister, Speaker of the House of Commons or Lord Chancellor; to extend the application to Northern Ireland of certain enactments relating to pensions; and for purposes connected with those matters.
Affiliation Proceedings (Amendment) Act 1972 (repealed)	1972 c. 49	27 July 1972
An Act to amend the law relating to proceedings for an affiliation order or for the variation, revocation or revival of such an order, and for connected purposes. (Repealed by Family Law Reform Act 1987 (c. 42))
Legal Advice and Assistance Act 1972 (repealed)	1972 c. 50	27 July 1972
An Act to make further provision for the purpose of making legal advice and assistance more readily available, including the employment of solicitors by the Law Society or the Law Society of Scotland for that purpose and for the purpose of giving legal aid; and to make provision for purposes connected with those matters. (Repealed for England and Wales by Legal Aid Act 1974 (c. 4) and for Scotland by Legal Aid (Scotland) Act 1986 (c. 47))
Chronically Sick and Disabled Persons (Scotland) Act 1972	1972 c. 51	27 July 1972
An Act to extend sections 1 and 2(1) of the Chronically Sick and Disabled Persons Act 1970 (Note: Chronically Sick and Disabled Persons Act 1970 (c. 44)) to Scotland.
Town and Country Planning (Scotland) Act 1972 (repealed)	1972 c. 52	27 July 1972
An Act to consolidate certain enactments relating to town and country planning in Scotland with amendments to give effect to recommendations of the Scottish Law Commission. (Repealed by Planning (Consequential Provisions) (Scotland) Act 1997 (c. 11))
Contracts of Employment Act 1972 (repealed)	1972 c. 53	27 July 1972
An Act to consolidate certain enactments relating to contracts of employment. (Repealed by Employment Protection (Consolidation) Act 1978 (c. 44))
British Library Act 1972	1972 c. 54	27 July 1972
An Act to establish a national library for the United Kingdom under the control and management of a new Board and incorporating the Library of the British Museum; and for connected purposes.
Sri Lanka Republic Act 1972	1972 c. 55	27 July 1972
An Act to make provision in connection with Ceylon becoming a republic within the Commonwealth under the name of Sri Lanka.
Appropriation Act 1972 (repealed)	1972 c. 56	9 August 1972
An Act to apply a sum out of the Consolidated Fund to the service of the year ending on 31st March 1973, and to appropriate the supplies granted in this Session of Parliament. (Repealed by Appropriation (No. 2) Act 1974 (c. 31))
National Insurance Act 1972 (repealed)	1972 c. 57	9 August 1972
An Act to amend the provisions of the National Insurance Act 1965, (Note: National Insurance Act 1965 (c. 51)) the National Insurance (Industrial Injuries) Act 1965 (Note: National Insurance (Industrial Injuries) Act 1965 (c. 52)) and the Industrial Injuries and Diseases (Old Cases) Act 1967 (Note: Industrial Injuries and Diseases (Old Cases) Act 1967 (c. 34)) as to the rate or amount of benefit and contributions; to alter the conditions for payment of attendance allowance and unemployability supplement; to modify certain provisions as to the determination of claims and questions under those Acts, and to make other administrative and financial adjustments; to make parallel provision for Northern Ireland; and for purposes connected with those matters. (Repealed by Social Security (Consequential Provisions) Act 1975 (c. 18))
National Health Service (Scotland) Act 1972	1972 c. 58	9 August 1972
An Act to make further provision as respects the health service in Scotland, and for connected purposes.
Administration of Justice (Scotland) Act 1972	1972 c. 59	9 August 1972
An Act to confer extended powers on the courts in Scotland to order the inspection of documents and other property, and related matters; to enable an appeal to be taken to the House of Lords from an interlocutor of the Court of Session on a motion for a new trial; to enable a case to be stated on a question of law to the Court of Session in an arbitration; and to enable alterations to be made by act of sederunt in the rate of interest to be included in sheriff court decrees or extracts.
Gas Act 1972	1972 c. 60	9 August 1972
An Act to make fresh provision with respect to the gas industry in Great Britain and related matters, and for purposes connected therewith.
Land Charges Act 1972	1972 c. 61	9 August 1972
An Act to consolidate certain enactments relating to the registration of land charges and other instruments and matters affecting land.
Agriculture (Miscellaneous Provisions) Act 1972	1972 c. 62	9 August 1972
An Act to make new provision for the prevention of diseases suffered or disseminated by animals and to amend the Diseases of Animals Act 1950; (Note: Diseases of Animals Act 1950 (14 Geo. 6. c. 36)) to amend the law relating to slaughterhouses, to the slaughter of animals in Scotland and to the improvement of live stock; to amend Part II of the Agriculture Act 1967; (Note: Agriculture Act 1967 (c. 22)) to make new provision in relation to the Agricultural Marketing Fund and the Agricultural Marketing (Scotland) Fund; to increase the amount which may be advanced under section 2 of the Agriculture Mortgage Corporation Act 1956; (Note: Agricultural Mortgage Corporation Act 1956 (4 & 5 Eliz. 2. c. 38)) to increase the penalties under the Agriculture (Poisonous Substances) Act 1952 (Note: Agriculture (Poisonous Substances) Act 1952 (15 & 16 Geo. 6 & 1 Eliz. 2. c. 60)) and the Agriculture (Safety, Health and Welfare Provisions) Act 1956; (Note: Agriculture (Safety, Health and Welfare Provisions) Act 1956 (4 & 5 Eliz. 2. c. 49)) to make new provision with respect to arbitrations under the Agricultural Holdings Act 1948; (Note: Agricultural Holdings Act 1948 (11 & 12 Geo. 6. c. 63)) to amend the Cereals Marketing Act 1965; (Note: Cereals Marketing Act 1965 (c. 14)) to amend the Corn Returns Act 1882 (Note: Corn Returns Act 1882 (45 & 46 Vict. c. 37)) and the Corn Sales Act 1921; (Note: Corn Sales Act 1921 (11 & 12 Geo. 5. c. 35)) to make new provision for obtaining agricultural statistics; to make further provision as to the use of poison against grey squirrels or coypus; to clarify the Plant Health Act 1967 (Note: Plant Health Act 1967 (c. 8)) as respects the recovery of expenses incurred by an authority exercising default powers under orders made by virtue of that Act; to abolish agricultural executive committees and certain other committees having functions in relation to agriculture or apiculture; to confer powers on the Secretary of State in relation to certain parks and other land in Scotland; to repeal paragraph (f) of Case 14 in Schedule 3 to the Rent Act 1968 and paragraph (f) of Case 15 in Schedule 3 to the Rent (Scotland) Act 1971; and for purposes connected with those matters.
Industry Act 1972	1972 c. 63	9 August 1972
An Act to authorise grants towards expenditure on the provision of assets for industry in certain regions in Great Britain, to authorise the provision of financial assistance for industry in those regions or elsewhere, and provisions about credits and grants for the building of ships and of offshore installations, to amend the Local Employment Act 1972 (Note: Local Employment Act 1972 (c. 5)) and to make temporary provision as to one of the areas to be treated as a development area under that Act; and for connected purposes.
Harbours Development (Scotland) Act 1972	1972 c. 64	9 August 1972
An Act to enable the Secretary of State to develop, maintain and manage, or authorise other persons so to do, harbours in Scotland, made or maintained by him for any purpose, and for purposes connected therewith.
National Debt Act 1972	1972 c. 65	9 August 1972
An Act to consolidate certain enactments relating to the national debt and the Director of Savings, with corrections and minor improvements made under the Consolidation of Enactments (Procedure) Act 1949. (Note: Consolidation of Enactments (Procedure) Act 1949 (12, 13 & 14 Geo. 6. c. 33))
Poisons Act 1972	1972 c. 66	9 August 1972
An Act to consolidate certain enactments relating to poisons.
Companies (Floating Charges and Receivers) (Scotland) Act 1972 (repealed)	1972 c. 67	17 October 1972
An Act to re-enact with modifications the law of Scotland in relation to floating charges; to make provision for the appointment and functioning of receivers in respect of incorporated companies which the Court of Session has jurisdiction to wind up; to confer on receivers or managers of the property and undertaking of a company incorporated in England certain powers over the property of that company in Scotland; and for purposes connected therewith. (Repealed by Companies Consolidation (Consequential Provisions) Act 1985 (c. 9))
European Communities Act 1972 (repealed)	1972 c. 68	17 October 1972
An Act to make provision in connection with the enlargement of the European Communities to include the United Kingdom, together with (for certain purposes) the Channel Islands, the Isle of Man and Gibraltar. (Repealed by European Union (Withdrawal) Act 2018 (c. 16))
Horserace Totalisator and Betting Levy Boards Act 1972	1972 c. 69	17 October 1972
An Act to extend the corporate powers of the Horserace Totalisator Board; to remove the limit on the number of members of that Board; to make provision with respect to applications by that Board for betting office licences; to transfer the functions of that Board with respect to the approval of horse racecourses to the Horserace Betting Levy Board; to facilitate the exercise of the functions of the government-appointed members of the Horserace Betting Levy Board; and for other purposes related to the activities of those Boards.
Local Government Act 1972	1972 c. 70	26 October 1972
An Act to make provision with respect to local government and the functions of local authorities in England and Wales; to amend Part II of the Transport Act 1968; (Note: Transport Act 1968 (c. 73)) to confer rights of appeal in respect of decisions relating to licences under the Home Counties (Music and Dancing) Licensing Act 1926; (Note: Home Counties (Music and Dancing) Licensing Act 1926 (16 & 17 Geo. 5. c. 31)) to make further provision with respect to magistrates' courts committees; to abolish certain inferior courts of record; and for connected purposes.
Criminal Justice Act 1972	1972 c. 71	26 October 1972
An Act to make further provision with respect to the administration of criminal justice, the criminal courts and the penal system, and to the methods of dealing with offenders (including the provision of new methods); to amend the law about qualification for jury service, the summoning of jurors and the payment of allowances in respect of jury service; to increase the penalties for certain offences and amend section 21 of the Firearms Act 1968 (Note: Firearms Act 1968 (c. 27)) and section 9 of the Public Order Act 1936; (Note: Public Order Act 1936 (1 Edw. 8 & 1 Geo. 6. c. 6)) and for purposes connected with those matters.
National Health Service (Family Planning) Amendment Act 1972	1972 c. 72	26 October 1972
An Act to secure the provision, as part of the National Health Service, by local health authorities of voluntary vasectomy services on the same basis as the contraception services provided under the National Health Service (Family Planning) Act 1967. (Note: National Health Service (Family Planning) Act 1967 (c. 39))
Museums and Galleries Admission Charges Act 1972	1972 c. 73	26 October 1972
An Act to remove impediments to the making of charges for admission to the national museums and galleries in Great Britain.
Counter-Inflation (Temporary Provisions) Act 1972 (repealed)	1972 c. 74	30 November 1972
An Act to authorise measures to counter inflation. (Repealed by Statute Law (Repeals) Act 1989 (c. 43))
Pensioners and Family Income Supplement Payments Act 1972	1972 c. 75	30 November 1972
An Act to make provision for payments to pensioners and further provision with respect to family income supplements; and for connected purposes.
Northern Ireland (Financial Provisions) Act 1972 (repealed)	1972 c. 76	7 December 1972
An Act to increase the limit on loans under section 35 of the Finance Act 1970, (Note: Finance Act 1970 (c. 24)) and to make temporary provision for grants in aid to Northern Ireland and for the laying before the House of Commons of certain accounts and reports. (Repealed by Statute Law (Repeals) Act 1993 (c. 50))
Northern Ireland (Border Poll) Act 1972	1972 c. 77	7 December 1972
An Act to provide for the holding in Northern Ireland of a poll with respect to the border.
Consolidated Fund (No. 3) Act 1972	1972 c. 78	12 December 1972
An Act to apply certain sums out of the Consolidated Fund to the service of the years ending on 31st March 1973 and 1974.
Post Office (Borrowing) Act 1972 (repealed)	1972 c. 79	21 December 1972
An Act to increase the statutory limits on the indebtedness of the Post Office and partially to release it from its liability to repay capital debt. (Repealed by British Telecommunications Act 1981 (c. 38))
Pensioners' Payments and National Insurance Contributions Act 1972	1972 c. 80	21 December 1972
An Act to extend section 1 of the Pensioners and Family Income Supplement Payments Act 1972 (Note: Pensioners and Family Income Supplement Payments Act 1972 (c. 75)) so as to entitle retirement pensioners to payments under that section when otherwise disentitled by the operation of the earnings rule; and, in relation to graduated contributions under the enactments relating to national insurance, to alter the construction of references in those enactments to remuneration.

== Local acts ==
Short title	Citation	Royal assent
Long title
Clyde Port Authority Order Confirmation Act 1972	1972 c. i	10 February 1972
An Act to confirm a Provisional Order under the Private Legislation Procedure (Scotland) Act 1936, (Note: Private Legislation Procedure (Scotland) Act 1936 (26 Geo. 5 & 1 Edw. 8. c. 52)) relating to the Clyde Port Authority.
	Clyde Port Authority Order 1971 (Note: Although passed in 1972, the short title specifies the year 1971.) Provisional Order to authorise the Clyde Port Authority to establish a new superannuation scheme; to increase certain borrowing powers of that Authority; and for other purposes.	
New Zealand and Australian Land Company Limited Order Confirmation Act 1972	1972 c. ii	1 March 1972
An Act to confirm a Provisional Order under the Private Legislation Procedure (Scotland) Act 1936, relating to the New Zealand and Australian Land Company Limited.
	New Zealand and Australian Land Company Limited Order 1972 Provisional Order to make provision for the transfer to the State of New South Wales in the Commonwealth of Australia of the registered office of The New Zealand and Australian Land Company Limited; for the cessation of application to that company of provisions of the Companies Acts 1948 to 1967; and for other purposes incidental thereto.	
Stoke-on-Trent Corporation Act 1972	1972 c. iii	23 March 1972
An Act to confer powers on the lord mayor, aldermen and citizens of the city of Stoke-on-Trent in relation to the supply of steam for industrial use; and for other purposes.
University of London King's College (Lease) Act 1972	1972 c. iv	23 March 1972
An Act to confer powers on the Secretary of State for the Environment to grant a lease of land and buildings on the Victoria Embankment to the University of London King's College; and for other purposes.
Clyde River Purification Board Act 1972	1972 c. v	11 May 1972
An Act to confer further powers on the Clyde River Purification Board in relation to the control of polluting discharges in or to underground strata and the promotion of cleanliness of the waters of their area; and for other purposes.
Lloyds & Bolsa International Bank Act 1972	1972 c. vi	11 May 1972
An Act to provide for the transfer to Lloyds & Bolsa International Bank Limited of part of the undertaking of Bank of London & South America Limited and the undertaking of Lloyds Bank Europe Limited; and for other purposes incidental thereto and consequential thereon.
Neath Corporation Act 1972 (repealed)	1972 c. vii	11 May 1972
An Act to make provision for the discontinuance of a slaughterhouse forming part of the markets undertaking of the mayor, aldermen and burgesses of the borough of Neath; and for other purposes. [Repealed as to the county of Mid Glamorgan by the Mid Glamorgan County Council Act 1987 (c.vii), s 56(1) & Sch 2, Pt I, subject to savings in Sch 3. Repealed by the West Glamorgan Act 1987 (c. viii), s 89(2) & Sch 6, Pt II, subject to transitional provisions and savings in Sch 5.]
United Kingdom Oil Pipelines Act 1972	1972 c. viii	11 May 1972
An Act to empower United Kingdom Oil Pipelines Limited to acquire lands; and for other purposes.
Saint Andrew's, Hove, Churchyard Act 1972 (repealed)	1972 c. ix	11 May 1972
An Act to amend certain provisions of the Hove Corporation Act 1966 (Note: Hove Corporation Act 1966 (c. xxxviii)) relating to the churchyard of the church of Saint Andrew in the borough of Hove; to make further provision with respect to the remains of deceased persons interred in parts of that churchyard; and for other purposes. [Repealed by the East Sussex Act 1981 (c. xxv), s 108(1) & Sch 6, subject to transitional provisions and savings in s 108(2) to (12).]
Oxfordshire and District Water Board Act 1972	1972 c. x	12 June 1972
An Act to confer further powers on the Oxfordshire and District Water Board; and for other purposes.
Solihull Corporation Act 1972 (repealed)	1972 c. xi	12 June 1972
An Act to confer powers upon the mayor, aldermen and burgesses of the county borough of Solihull with regard to finance; and for other purposes. [Repealed by the West Midlands County Council Act 1980 (c.xi), s 121(1) & Sch 5, Pt I, subject to the transitional provisions and savings in s 121(2) to (14).]
Reigate Congregational Church Act 1972	1972 c. xii	12 June 1972
An Act to authorise the use of the burial ground attached to or comprised in the Reigate Congregational Church, and premises appurtenant thereto for building or otherwise; and for purposes incidental thereto.
Whitley Bay Pier (Extension of Time) Act 1972	1972 c. xiii	12 June 1972
An Act to extend the time for the commencement of the work authorised by the Whitley Bay Pier Act 1966; (Note: Whitley Bay Pier Act 1966 (c. xxxv)) and for other purposes.
Congregational Chapel and Trust Property Deptford Act 1972	1972 c. xiv	12 June 1972
An Act to authorise the London Congregational Union (Incorporated) to dispose of the Congregational Chapel and Trust Property in High Street Deptford in the London Borough of Lewisham free from restrictions; to authorise the erection of buildings thereon; and for other purposes.
Royal Bank of Scotland Limited Widows' and Orphans' Fund Order Confirmation Act 1972	1972 c. xv	29 June 1972
An Act to confirm a Provisional Order under the Private Legislation Procedure (Scotland) Act 1936, relating to the Royal Bank of Scotland Limited Widows' and Orphans' Fund.
	Royal Bank of Scotland Limited Widows' and Orphans' Fund Order 1972 Provisional Order to transfer the assets of the Royal Bank of Scotland Officers' Widows' Fund to the Trustees of The Royal Bank of Scotland Limited Widows' and Orphans' Fund and for purposes incidental to or consequential thereon.	
Mersey Tunnel Act 1972 (repealed)	1972 c. xvi	29 June 1972
An Act to amend certain financial provisions of the Mersey Tunnel (Liverpool/Wallasey) &c. Act 1965 (Note: Mersey Tunnel (Liverpool/Wallasey) &c. Act 1965 (c. xl)) and the Mersey Tunnel (Liverpool/Wallasey) Act 1968; (Note: Mersey Tunnel (Liverpool/Wallasey) Act 1968 (c. xii)) to amend the maximum amount of the fine which may be imposed for breach or non-observance of byelaws made under the said Act of 1965; and for other purposes. [Repealed by the County of Merseyside Act 1980 (c. x), s 146(3)(b) & Sch 5, subject to the provisions of Sch 3.]
Seaham Harbour Dock Act 1972	1972 c. xvii	29 June 1972
An Act to confer powers on the Seaham Harbour Dock Company in relation to the capital and management of their undertaking; to confer further powers on the Company; and for other purposes.
United Reformed Church Act 1972	1972 c. xviii	29 June 1972
An Act to make provision as to property held on behalf of the Congregational Church in England and Wales and its member churches and of the Presbyterian Church of England, and for other purposes incidental to or consequential upon the formation of the United Reformed Church (Congregational-Presbyterian) in England and Wales.
Culag (Lochinver) Pier Order Confirmation Act 1972	1972 c. xix	27 July 1972
An Act to confirm a Provisional Order under the Private Legislation Procedure (Scotland) Act 1936, relating to Culag (Lochinver) Pier.
	Culag (Lochinver) Pier Order 1972 Provisional Order to authorise the County Council of Sutherland to carry out works for the extension and improvement of the Culag (Lochinver) Pier in the parish of Assynt in the county of Sutherland and to borrow money; and for other purposes.	
Stromness (Vehicle Ferry Terminal) Pier &c. Order Confirmation Act 1972 (repealed)	1972 c. xx	27 July 1972
An Act to confirm a Provisional Order under the Private Legislation Procedure (Scotland) Act 1936, relating to Stromness (Vehicle Ferry Terminal) Pier &c. [Repealed by the Orkney Islands Council Order 1978, art 9 & Sch 2, a provisional order that was confirmed by the Orkney Islands Council Order Confirmation Act 1978 (c. iv), s 1.]
	Stromness (Vehicle Ferry Terminal) Pier &c. Order 1972 Provisional Order to authorise the Town Council of Stromness to carry out works for the improvement of the harbour of Stromness and to borrow money; and for other purposes.	
Railway Clearing System Superannuation Fund Act 1972	1972 c. xxi	27 July 1972
An Act to empower the Railway Clearing System Superannuation Fund Corporation to transfer certain assets of the fund of that Corporation to Coras Iompair Eireann and the Northern Ireland Transport Holding Company in respect of certain contributing, non-contributing and superannuated members of that fund and for the cesser of membership of that fund of the persons having an interest in the transferred assets; and for other purposes.
Bath Corporation Act 1972	1972 c. xxii	27 July 1972
An Act to confer further powers on the mayor, aldermen and citizens of the city of Bath in relation to the finances of the city; to make further provision with regard to the improvement of the city; and for other purposes.
Sunderland Corporation Act 1972	1972 c. xxiii	27 July 1972
An Act to transfer the undertaking of the River Wear Commissioners to the mayor, aldermen and burgesses of the borough of Sunderland; and for other purposes.
Upper Avon Navigation Act 1972	1972 c. xxiv	27 July 1972
An Act to make provision for the conservancy of the navigation of the upper part of the river Avon in the counties of Warwick and Worcester; to confer powers upon the Upper Avon Navigation Trust Limited to regulate the use of such part of the river Avon by vessels; and for other purposes.
Killingholme Generating Station (Ancillary Powers) Act 1972 (repealed)	1972 c. xxv	27 July 1972
An Act to confer powers upon the Central Electricity Generating Board for the construction of ancillary works in connection with the proposed Killingholme Generating Station and for the acquisition of lands and easements for the purposes thereof or in connection therewith; and for other purposes. (Repealed by the Killingholme Generating Stations (Ancillary Powers) Act 1991 (c. viii))
Westminster Abbey and Saint Margaret Westminster Act 1972	1972 c. xxvi	27 July 1972
An Act to provide for the division for ecclesiastical purposes between Westminster Abbey and the adjoining parishes of the parish of Saint Margaret Westminster and for the dissolution of that parish and its rectory; to provide for the vesting in the Dean and Chapter of Westminster of the church of Saint Margaret Westminster and certain other property held for its benefit and for the maintenance by the Dean and Chapter of that church and the services to be held therein; and for other purposes.
Greater London Council (Money) Act 1972	1972 c. xxvii	27 July 1972
An Act to regulate the expenditure on capital account and on lending to other persons by the Greater London Council during the financial period from 1st April 1972 to 30th September 1973; and for other purposes.
Cornwall River Authority Act 1972	1972 c. xxviii	27 July 1972
An Act to confer further powers on the Cornwall River Authority in relation to the acquisition of lands, and for other purposes.
Coventry Corporation Act 1972	1972 c. xxix	27 July 1972
An Act to confer further powers upon the lord mayor, aldermen and citizens of the city of Coventry; to make further provision with regard to the health, local government, welfare, improvement and finances of the city; and for other purposes.
Devon County Council Act 1972	1972 c. xxx	27 July 1972
An Act to confer further powers on the Devon County Council and on local and highway authorities in the administrative county of Devon in relation to lands, amenities, highways and public order and the local government, improvement, health and finances of the county; and for other purposes.
Derby Corporation Act 1972	1972 c. xxxi	27 July 1972
An Act to confer further powers upon the mayor, aldermen and burgesses of the county borough of Derby; to make further provision with regard to the health, local government, welfare, improvement and finances of the borough; and for other purposes.
Friends of the Clergy Corporation Act 1972	1972 c. xxxii	27 July 1972
An Act to amalgamate The Friend of the Clergy Corporation and The Poor Clergy Relief Corporation in a new corporate body; to define the objects and powers of the new incorporated body and to make provision with respect to the property and funds of the said Corporations; and for other purposes.
Kensington and Chelsea Corporation Act 1972	1972 c. xxxiii	27 July 1972
An Act to make further provision for the local government, health and improvement of the Royal borough of Kensington and Chelsea; and for other purposes.
Oxford Corporation Act 1972 (repealed)	1972 c. xxxiv	27 July 1972
An Act to confer further powers upon the lord mayor, aldermen and citizens of Oxford with regard to finance; and for other purposes. [Repealed by the Oxfordshire Act 1985 (c. xxxiv), s 49(2) & Sch 3, Pt I, subject to the provisions of Sch 2.]
British Railways Act 1972	1972 c. xxxv	27 July 1972
An Act to empower the British Railways Board to construct a work and to acquire lands; to confer further powers on the Board; and for other purposes.
Bath Side Bay Development Act 1972 (repealed)	1972 c. xxxvi	9 August 1972
An Act to empower Earlpar Development Company Limited to construct and operate works at Bath Side Bay, Harwich; and for other purposes. [Repealed by the Harwich Parkeston Quay Act 1988 (c. xxviii), s 25 & Sch 2.]
British Transport Docks Act 1972	1972 c. xxxvii	9 August 1972
An Act to confer further powers on the British Transport Docks Board for the regulation of navigation in the Humber and in relation to the Board's docks and harbours therein; to extend the limits of the docks and harbours of the Board at Barry, Cardiff and Southampton and confer further powers on the Board in relation thereto; to extend the time for the compulsory purchase of certain lands; and for other purposes.
Devon River Authority (General Powers) Act 1972	1972 c. xxxviii	9 August 1972
An Act to confer further powers on the Devon River Authority in relation to the acquisition of lands, and the administration of the area of the Authority; to make further provision with regard to the finances of the Authority and for the welfare of their staff; and for other purposes.
Essex River Authority Act 1972	1972 c. xxxix	9 August 1972
An Act to abolish the internal drainage districts in the area of the Essex River Authority; to confer further powers on the Authority in relation to the acquisition of lands, the performance of their functions and the administration of their area; to make further provision with regard to the finances of the Authority and for the welfare of their staff; and for other purposes.
Greater London Council (General Powers) Act 1972	1972 c. xl	9 August 1972
An Act to confer further powers upon the Greater London Council and other authorities; and for other purposes.
Liverpool Corporation Act 1972	1972 c. xli	9 August 1972
An Act to confer further powers on the lord mayor, aldermen and citizens of the city of Liverpool in relation to taxicabs and private hire vehicles; to empower them to assist The Mersey Docks and Harbour Company; to amend certain agreements for the supply of water in bulk; to make further provision for the improvement, local government and finances of the city; and for other purposes.
London Transport Act 1972	1972 c. xlii	9 August 1972
An Act to empower the London Transport Executive to construct works and to acquire lands; to extend the time for the compulsory purchase of certain lands; to confer further powers on the Executive; and for other purposes.
Milford Docks Act 1972	1972 c. xliii	9 August 1972
An Act to confer further powers on the Milford Docks Company with regard to finance and administration; and for other purposes.
Selnec (Manchester Central Area Railway, &c.) Act 1972	1972 c. xliv	9 August 1972
An Act to empower the South East Lancashire and North East Cheshire Passenger Transport Executive and the British Railways Board to construct works and to acquire lands; and for other purposes.
Thames Barrier and Flood Prevention Act 1972	1972 c. xlv	9 August 1972
An Act to empower the Greater London Council to provide and operate a flood barrier, with movable gates, across the river Thames in Woolwich Reach, and in connection therewith to execute subsidiary works and to acquire lands; to confer further powers on the Greater London Council, the Essex River Authority and the Kent River Authority and other authorities; to amend certain enactments relating to flood prevention; and for other purposes.
Thames Conservancy Act 1972	1972 c. xlvi	9 August 1972
An Act to amend the Thames Conservancy Acts and Orders 1932 to 1966; to confer further powers upon the Conservators of the river Thames in relation to their finances, the investment of their funds, the discharge of water, the protection of underground water and the acquisition of easements; and for other purposes.
Hampshire County Council Act 1972	1972 c. xlvii	9 August 1972
An Act to confer further powers on the Hampshire County Council and local authorities in the administrative county of Hampshire in relation to the lands, development, amenities, highways and the local government, improvement, health and finances of the county; to make further provision for the superannuation of employees; and for other purposes.
Dundee Extension Order Confirmation Act 1972	1972 c. xlviii	26 October 1972
An Act to confirm a Provisional Order under the Private Legislation Procedure (Scotland) Act 1936, relating to Dundee Extension.
	Dundee Extension Order 1972 Provisional Order to extend the boundaries of the city and royal burgh of Dundee; and for other purposes.	
Port Talbot Corporation Act 1972	1972 c. xlix	26 October 1972
An Act to repeal or re-enact with amendments local enactments in force in the borough of Port Talbot; to enact provisions in relation to the lands, health, local government, markets, industry and finances of the borough; to confer further powers on the mayor, aldermen and burgesses of that borough; and for other purposes.
West Sussex County Council Act 1972	1972 c. l	26 October 1972
An Act to reconstitute the Littlehampton Harbour Board, to transfer functions of the board under the Land Drainage Acts to the Sussex River Authority and to make provision with respect to the finances and accounts of the board; to confer further powers on the West Sussex County Council and on local, highway and other authorities in the administrative county of West Sussex in relation to lands, planning and amenities, highways and the local government, improvement, health and finances of the county and of the boroughs and districts therein; to enable the bridge over the river Arun authorised by the Littlehampton Urban District Council (Arun Bridge) Act 1905 (Note: Littlehampton Urban District Council (Arun Bridge) Act 1905 (5 Edw. 7. c. clxxx)) to be removed; and for other purposes.
Anglesey Marine Terminal Act 1972	1972 c. li	26 October 1972
An Act to provide for the vesting in the Anglesey County Council of the harbour undertaking of the Amlwch Urban District Council; to authorise the said county council and Shell U.K. Limited to construct works and acquire lands; to confer powers on the said county council with reference to the undertaking vested in them or authorised by this Act; and for other purposes.
Aberdeen Harbour Order Confirmation Act 1972	1972 c. lii	30 November 1972
An Act to confirm a Provisional Order under the Private Legislation Procedure (Scotland) Act 1936, relating to Aberdeen Harbour.
	Aberdeen Harbour Order 1972 Provisional Order to authorise the Aberdeen Harbour Board to make and operate schemes for regulating the berthing of fishing vessels at the fish market and for other purposes connected therewith.	
Scrabster Harbour (Vehicle Ferry Terminal &c.) Order Confirmation Act 1972	1972 c. liii	30 November 1972
An Act to confirm a Provisional Order under the Private Legislation Procedure (Scotland) Act 1936, relating to Scrabster Harbour (Vehicle Ferry Terminal &c.).
	Scrabster Harbour (Vehicle Ferry Terminal &c.) Order 1972 Provisional Order to authorise the Trustees of the Harbour of Scrabster to carry out works for the improvement of their harbour undertaking and to increase their power to borrow money; and for other purposes.	

== Personal act ==
Short title	Citation	Royal assent
Long title
Wellington Estate Act 1972	1972 c. 1	11 May 1972
An Act for enabling the Parliamentary Settlement of the Duke of Wellington to be terminated by the repeal of the Estate Acts; to provide for the Parliamentary Estate to be appropriated among the family; to provide for the establishment of new settlements and the powers and the duties of the respective trustees in connection with the property to be held on the new settlements; to provide for the retirement and the appointment of trustees; and for other purposes connected with that Settlement.

== See also ==
- List of acts of the Parliament of the United Kingdom
