= Capital murder =

Murder that is punishable by death

Capital murder refers to a category of murder in some parts of the US for which the perpetrator is eligible for the death penalty. In its original sense, capital murder was a statutory offence of aggravated murder in Great Britain, Northern Ireland, and the Republic of Ireland, which was later adopted as a legal provision to define certain forms of aggravated murder in the United States. Some jurisdictions that provide for death as a possible punishment for murder, such as California, do not have a specific statute creating or defining a crime known as capital murder; instead, death is one of the possible sentences for certain kinds of murder. In these cases, "capital murder" is not a phrase used in the legal system but may still be used by others such as the media.

== Great Britain ==
In Great Britain, this offence was created by section 5 of the Homicide Act 1957. Previously all murders carried the death penalty on conviction, but the 1957 Act limited the death penalty to the following cases:

- Murder in the course or furtherance of theft; s.5(1)(a)
- Murder by shooting or by causing an explosion; s.5(1)(b)
- Murder in the course or for the purpose of resisting, avoiding or preventing a lawful arrest, or of effecting or assisting an escape or rescue from legal custody; s.5(1)(c)
- Murder of a police officer acting in the execution of his duty, or of a person assisting a police officer so acting; s.5(1)(d)
- Murder of a prison officer acting in the execution of his duty, or of a person assisting a prison officer so acting, by a person who was a prisoner at the time when he did or was a party to the murder; s.5(1)(e).

In all other cases murder carried the mandatory penalty of imprisonment for life.

Section 1 of the Murder (Abolition of Death Penalty) Act 1965 abolished the separate category of capital murder, and all murders now carry the mandatory penalty of imprisonment for life.

== China ==
Whilst China does not a distinguish a separate crime of "capital murder", the law specifies capital punishment as one of a number of possible punishments that can be adjudicated for murder.

Article 232 of the Criminal Law of the People's Republic of China (2017) reads:

Whoever intentionally commits homicide shall be sentenced to: death, life imprisonment, or fixed-term imprisonment of not less than 10 years. If the circumstances are relatively minor, the offender shall be sentenced to fixed-term imprisonment of not less than 3 years but not more than 10 years.

== Northern Ireland ==
In Northern Ireland, this offence was created by section 10 of the Criminal Justice Act (Northern Ireland) 1966. On the trial of an indictment for capital murder, the jury could not return an alternative verdict to the offence charged in that indictment under section 6(2) of the Criminal Law Act (Northern Ireland) 1967.

Sections 1(4) and (5) of the Northern Ireland (Emergency Provisions) Act 1973 read:

(4) For the purpose of any proceedings on or subsequent to a person's trial on a charge of capital murder, that charge and any plea or finding of guilty of capital murder shall be treated as being or having been a charge, or a plea or finding of guilty, of murder only; and if at the commencement of this Act a person is under a sentence of death for capital murder, the sentence shall have effect as a sentence of imprisonment for life.
(5) In this section "capital murder" means a murder which immediately before the commencement of this Act is a capital murder within the meaning of section 10 of the Criminal Justice Act (Northern Ireland) 1966.

== Republic of Ireland ==
The Criminal Justice Act 1964 reduced the penalty for the common law offence of murder from death to life imprisonment, but specified that the death penalty would still apply to "capital murder", defined as murder committed in certain circumstances, namely:

- of a Garda (police) or prison officer "acting in the course of his duty"; or
- for a political motive, of a foreign head of state, diplomat, or government member; or
- in the course or furtherance of certain offences under the Offences against the State Act 1939:
  - Usurpation of functions of government (Irish republican legitimists believed the IRA Army Council was the legitimate government of Ireland)
  - Obstruction of government (legislative, judicial, or executive branches)
  - Obstruction of the President
  - Interference with military or other employees of the State
  - Furtherance of the aims of an organisation which is unlawful for reasons other than tax resistance (this applied to the Irish Republican Army and Irish National Liberation Army)

To be found guilty of capital murder, a person had to be charged in the indictment with "capital murder" rather than "murder". A defendant on trial for "capital murder" could be found not guilty of capital murder but guilty of murder or manslaughter as a lesser included offence. The meaning of "capital murder" under the 1964 act was elucidated by the Supreme Court in the 1977 case of Noel and Marie Murray, convicted by the Special Criminal Court (SCC) of capital murder after the 1975 shooting of a Garda, who was off duty and not in uniform, giving chase after they had robbed a bank. The court held that "capital murder" was a new offence, not merely a subtype of the existing common law offence of murder; and that the Garda was acting "in the course of his duty", despite not being on duty; but that, as he was in plain clothes, the Murrays did not know he was a Garda; and so, while there was intent (mens rea) to commit murder, there was no intent to commit capital murder. The Supreme Court substituted a conviction of simple murder for Noel Murray; Marie Murray was retried by the SCC for simple murder and convicted. After the Murrays, nine others were convicted of capital murder, all of whom were sentenced to death by the SCC for murders committed between 1980 and 1986 of Gardaí acting in the course of their duty. All sentences were commuted to life imprisonment by President Patrick Hillery on the advice of the Government; of these, Peter Pringle's conviction was overturned in 1995 as unsafe.

The Criminal Justice Act 1990 abolished the death penalty for all offences and repealed the provisions of the 1964 act relating to capital murder. Section 3 of the 1990 act listed the same circumstances of murder as those which the 1964 act designated as "capital murder", and sections 4 and 5 specified stronger minimum sentence and remission rules for murders in those circumstances than for other murders. Several legal texts call this "aggravated murder". The indictment must specify that section 3 of the 1990 act applies to the murder, and the act amended earlier statutes to replace "capital murder" with "murder to which section 3 of the Criminal Justice Act 1990 applies". While this is the legal description, and as such used in later statutes, such murders are often called "capital murder" by the media, and the term has been used by judges in jury instructions. After the 2020 shooting of an on-duty Garda, the killer was charged in 2021 with "capital murder, contrary to common law as provided for by Section 4 of the Criminal Justice Act 1964, Section 3 (1) (a), Section 3 (2) and Section 4 of the Criminal Justice Act 1990".

The Twenty-first Amendment of the Constitution of Ireland passed in 2001 prevents the re-enactment of the death penalty.

== United States ==
=== Legal meaning ===
The term "capital murder" is used in only seven U.S. states; however, 27 states and United States federal government currently allow capital punishment, and each has its own terminology for an offense punishable by death. In most states, the term "first-degree murder" is used; others may use the term "aggravated murder" (such as New York, Ohio, Oregon, Utah, Vermont, and Virginia (since 2021)), and some use simply "murder". The states that use the term "capital murder" are Alabama, Arkansas, Kansas, Mississippi, New Hampshire, and Texas. The state of Georgia uses the term "malicious murder".

Not all offenses are parallel between the states. In some, first-degree murder is a very broad term defined by a number of circumstances, only a few of which make a defendant eligible for execution. In other jurisdictions, an offense carrying the death penalty is strictly defined and is separate from other, similar crimes.

Although legal definitions vary, capital murder in the United States usually means murder involving one or more of the following factors:

- The victim is a police officer, firefighter, paramedic or similar first responder public servant and was killed while on duty;
- The victim is a public official, holder of public office, or a candidate of public office;
- The victim is killed during the commission of another felony, such as robbery, burglary, kidnapping, arson, etc. (felony murder);
- The victim is tortured, raped, or sexually assaulted, particularly if the victim is a child;
- Multiple murders are committed pursuant to one another;
- Murder-for-hire;
- Terrorism (e.g., hijacking of an aircraft);
- The victim is a child;
- Killing of a person through the discharge of a firearm from a vehicle at a person, or discharge of a firearm at a vehicle, building, residence, or occupiable structure.
- The victim is murdered based on race, national origin, and other associated groups (hate crime);
- The victim is to or has testified, or is or has been subpoenaed to testify in any proceeding, and the murder stems from, is caused by, or is related to the capacity or role of the victim as a witness;
- The accused committed murder whilst an inmate.

Some states may include other factors which amount to capital murder or its legal equivalent.

=== Punishment ===
Capital offenses in the United States are not punishable by death exclusively. Most states afford courts the option of imposing either the death penalty or a life sentence upon conviction, though lesser sentences are rare and in some cases legally impossible. Depending on the state, the presiding judge may determine the sentence, or the decision may be left to the jury.

The United States Supreme Court has placed limitations on the use of the death penalty and has prohibited its use in cases where the offender is mentally incompetent, or was under the age of 18 at the time of the offense.

== Sources ==
- Irish Statute Book: Criminal Justice Act 1964 and Criminal Justice Act 1990

== Citations ==
https://www.economist.com/china/2023/11/23/china-says-it-has-achieved-a-miraculously-low-crime-society#:~:text=The%20recorded%20homicide%20rate%20per,%25%20and%20assaults%20by%2040%25. https://nypost.com/2021/02/18/chinas-authoritarian-execution-system-spares-no-prisoner/ https://www.chinajusticeobserver.com/a/how-many-crimes-are-punishable-by-death-in-china
