= List of acts of the Parliament of the United Kingdom from 1968 =

This is a list of acts of the Parliament of the United Kingdom passed in 1968.

Acts passed since 1963 are cited by calendar year, as opposed to the convention used for earlier acts of citing the regnal year(s) in which the relevant parliamentary session was held. Each act passed in a respective year is given a chapter number (abbreviated "c."), denoted by Arabic numerals in the case of public general acts, lowercase Roman numerals in the case of local acts, or italicised Arabic numerals in the case of personal acts. These run as separate series.

121 acts of Parliament were passed in 1968: 77 public general acts and 44 local acts.

indicates that an act has been transcribed on Wikisource, indicates that an act is available to view at legislation.gov.uk, and indicates the location of the original act in the Parliamentary Archives.

== Public general acts ==
Short title	Citation	Royal assent
Long title
Consolidated Fund Act 1968 (repealed)	1968 c. 1	1 February 1968
An Act to apply a sum out of the Consolidated Fund to the service of the year ending on 31st March 1968. (Repealed by Statute Law (Repeals) Act 1971 (c. 52))
Provisional Collection of Taxes Act 1968	1968 c. 2	1 February 1968
An Act to consolidate the Provisional Collection of Taxes Act 1913 (Note: Provisional Collection of Taxes Act 1913 (3 & 4 Geo. 5. c. 3)) and certain other enactments relating to the provisional collection of taxes or matters connected therewith.
Capital Allowances Act 1968 (repealed)	1968 c. 3	1 February 1968
An Act to consolidate Parts X and XI of the Income Tax Act 1952 (Note: Income Tax Act 1952 (15 & 16 Geo. 6 & 1 Eliz. 2. c. 10)) with related provisions in that Act and subsequent Acts, but without the provisions of the said Part X relating to patents or to agricultural estate management expenditure which is not capital expenditure. (Repealed by Capital Allowances Act 1990 (c. 1))
Erskine Bridge Tolls Act 1968 (repealed)	1968 c. 4	15 February 1968
An Act to empower the Secretary of State to levy tolls in respect of the use of a new road which crosses the River Clyde at Erskine and of certain roads provided in connection therewith; to enable the Secretary of State to provide parking places in connection with those roads and, in relation to those roads, to impose prohibitions, restrictions and other requirements for the purpose of preventing obstruction and for the protection of property and otherwise; and for connected purposes. (Repealed by Abolition of Bridge Tolls (Scotland) Act 2008 (asp 1))
Administration of Justice Act 1968 (repealed)	1968 c. 5	15 February 1968
An Act to make provision with respect to the maximum numbers of Lords of Appeal in Ordinary and certain other judges. (Repealed for Scotland by Court of Session Act 1988 (c. 36) and for England and Wales and Northern Ireland by Constitutional Reform Act 2005 (c. 4))
Trustee Savings Banks Act 1968 (repealed)	1968 c. 6	15 February 1968
An Act to amend the law relating to trustee savings banks. (Repealed by Trustee Savings Banks Act 1969 (c. 50))
London Cab Act 1968	1968 c. 7	15 February 1968
An Act to extend the power of the Secretary of State to prescribe fares in respect of journeys by cab within the metropolitan police district and the City of London; to make provision for extending the length of such journeys which the driver of a cab is obliged by law to undertake; to relax restrictions on the parking of cabs; to prohibit the display on certain vehicles in that district or the City of London of signs or notices containing the word "taxi" or "cab" and signs or notices of certain other descriptions; and to restrict the issue, in connection with certain vehicles, of advertisements containing either of those words.
Mauritius Independence Act 1968	1968 c. 8	29 February 1968
An Act to make provision for, and in connection with, the attainment by Mauritius of fully responsible status within the Commonwealth.
Commonwealth Immigrants Act 1968 (repealed)	1968 c. 9	1 March 1968
An Act to amend sections 1 and 2 of the Commonwealth Immigrants Act 1962, (Note: Commonwealth Immigrants Act 1962 (10 & 11 Eliz. 2. c. 21)) and Schedule 1 to that Act, and to make further provision as to Commonwealth citizens landing in the United Kingdom, the Channel Islands or the Isle of Man; and for purposes connected with the matters aforesaid. (Repealed by Immigration Act 1971 (c. 77))
Transport Holding Company Act 1968	1968 c. 10	6 March 1968
An Act to amend or clarify the provisions of section 29 of the Transport Act 1962 (Note: Transport Act 1962 (10 & 11 Eliz. 2. c. 46)) with respect to the objects and powers of the Transport Holding Company.
Revenue Act 1968 (repealed)	1968 c. 11	13 March 1968
An Act to reduce the amount of certain payments under the Selective Employment Payments Act 1966 (Note: Selective Employment Payments Act 1966 (c. 32)) with exceptions for development areas, and to amend the law about export rebates. (Repealed by Statute Law (Repeals) Act 1986 (c. 12))
Teachers Superannuation (Scotland) Act 1968	1968 c. 12	13 March 1968
An Act to amend the law in Scotland relating to the superannuation and other benefits payable to or in respect of teachers and certain other persons employed in connection with the provision of educational services, and for connected purposes.
National Loans Act 1968	1968 c. 13	13 March 1968
An Act to establish a National Loans Fund, to substitute the National Loans Fund for the Consolidated Fund in certain enactments, including enactments relating to Government lending and advances, the Exchange Equalisation Account and government annuities, to make profits of the Issue Department of the Bank of England payable into the National Loans Fund and to make other provision as to the said Department, to charge the whole of the national debt on the National Loans Fund, and to amend the law about Government borrowing; to make further provision for loans by the Public Works Loan Commissioners, and to authorise advances out of the National Loans Fund for the purpose of such loans; to transfer to Votes certain payments charged on the Consolidated Fund; and generally to make provision for the management of the Government's financial business.
Public Expenditure and Receipts Act 1968	1968 c. 14	20 March 1968
An Act to increase contributions payable under the National Insurance Act 1965 (Note: National Insurance Act 1965 (c. 51)) and the National Health Service Contributions Act 1965, (Note: National Health Service Contributions Act 1965 (c. 54)) and to strengthen the provisions of the former Act as to enforcement; to restrict the enactments providing for the supply of milk to school children; to provide compensation for civil defence employees in connection with the reduction of activities under section 2 of the Civil Defence Act 1948; (Note: Civil Defence Act 1948 (12, 13 & 14 Geo. 6. c. 5)) to provide for increasing, or for abolishing in the interests of economy, certain fees and other payments; and to amend section 3 of the Local Employment Act 1960 (Note: Local Employment Act 1960 (8 & 9 Eliz. 2. c. 18)) as regards consultation with the advisory committee; and for purposes connected therewith.
Consolidated Fund (No. 2) Act 1968 (repealed)	1968 c. 15	28 March 1968
An Act to apply certain sums out of the Consolidated Fund to the service of the years ending on 31st March 1967, 1968 and 1969. (Repealed by Statute Law (Repeals) Act 1971 (c. 52))
New Towns (Scotland) Act 1968	1968 c. 16	28 March 1968
An Act to consolidate certain enactments relating to new towns and to matters connected therewith, being those enactments in their application to Scotland; with corrections and improvements made under the Consolidation of Enactments (Procedure) Act 1949. (Note: Consolidation of Enactments (Procedure) Act 1949 (12, 13 & 14 Geo. 6. c. 33))
Education Act 1968 (repealed)	1968 c. 17	10 April 1968
An Act to amend the law as to the effect of and procedure for making changes in the character, size or situation of county schools or voluntary schools to enable special age limits to be adopted for existing as well as for new schools, and to make certain other amendments as to the approval or provision of school premises; and for purposes connected therewith. (Repealed by Education Act 1996 (c. 56))
Consular Relations Act 1968	1968 c. 18	10 April 1968
An Act to give effect to the Vienna Convention on Consular Relations; to enable effect to be given to other agreements concerning consular relations and to make further provision with respect to consular relations between the United Kingdom and other countries and matters arising in connection therewith; to restrict the jurisdiction of courts with respect to certain matters concerning or arising on board certain ships or aircraft; to enable diplomatic agents and consular officers to administer oaths and do notarial acts in certain cases; and for purposes connected with those matters.
Criminal Appeal Act 1968	1968 c. 19	8 May 1968
An Act to consolidate certain enactments relating to appeals in criminal cases to the criminal division of the Court of Appeal, and thence to the House of Lords.
Courts-Martial (Appeals) Act 1968	1968 c. 20	8 May 1968
An Act to consolidate the Courts-Martial (Appeals) Act 1951 (Note: Courts-Martial (Appeals) Act 1951 (14 & 15 Geo. 6. c. 46)) and the enactments amending it, including so much of the Administration of Justice Act 1960 (Note: Administration of Justice Act 1960 (8 & 9 Eliz. 2. c. 65)) as provides an appeal from the Courts-Martial Appeal Court to the House of Lords.
Criminal Appeal (Northern Ireland) Act 1968 (repealed)	1968 c. 21	8 May 1968
An Act to consolidate the enactments relating to the Court of Criminal Appeal in Northern Ireland, the jurisdiction of the Court and appeals therefrom to the House of Lords. (Repealed by Criminal Appeal (Northern Ireland) Act 1980 (c. 47))
Legitimation (Scotland) Act 1968 (repealed)	1968 c. 22	8 May 1968
An Act to amend and codify the law of Scotland relating to the legitimation of illegitimate persons by the subsequent marriage of their parents; to make provision in relation to the recognition under the law of Scotland of legitimation effected under foreign law and to the effects of such recognition; and for connected purposes. (Repealed by Family Law (Scotland) Act 2006 (asp 2))
Rent Act 1968	1968 c. 23	8 May 1968
An Act to consolidate the Rent and Mortgage Interest Restrictions Acts 1920 to 1939, the Furnished Houses (Rent Control) Act 1946, (Note: Furnished Houses (Rent Control) Act 1946 (9 & 10 Geo. 6. c. 34)) the Landlord and Tenant (Rent Control) Act 1949, (Note: Landlord and Tenant (Rent Control) Act 1949 (12, 13 & 14 Geo. 6. c. 40)) Part II of the Housing Repairs and Rents Act 1954, (Note: Housing Repairs and Rents Act 1954 (2 & 3 Eliz. 2. c. 53)) the Rent Act 1957 (Note: Rent Act 1957 (5 & 6 Eliz. 2. c. 25)) (except section 16 thereof), the Rent Act 1965 (Note: Rent Act 1965 (c. 75)) (except Part III thereof) and other related enactments.
Commonwealth Telecommunications Act 1968	1968 c. 24	8 May 1968
An Act to make provision as to the legal capacity of the Commonwealth Telecommunications Bureau and for the repeal of the provisions relating to the Commonwealth Telecommunications Board.
Local Authorities' Mutual Investment Trust Act 1968	1968 c. 25	30 May 1968
An Act to extend the scope of the powers of investment made collectively by local authorities through the Local Authorities' Mutual Investment Trust.
Export Guarantees Act 1968 (repealed)	1968 c. 26	30 May 1968
An Act to consolidate the Export Guarantees Acts 1949 to 1967 as amended by the National Loans Act 1968. (Note: National Loans Act 1968 (c. 13)) (Repealed by Export Guarantees Act 1975 (c. 38))
Firearms Act 1968	1968 c. 27	30 May 1968
An Act to consolidate the Firearms Acts 1937 (Note: Firearms Act 1937 (1 Edw. 8 & 1 Geo. 6. c. 12)) and 1965, (Note: Firearms Act 1965 (c. 44)) the Air Guns and Shot Guns, etc., Act 1962, (Note: Air Guns and Shot Guns, etc., Act 1962 (10 & 11 Eliz. 2. c. 49)) Part V of the Criminal Justice Act 1967 (Note: Criminal Justice Act 1967 (c. 80)) and certain enactments amending the Firearms Act 1937.
Wills Act 1968	1968 c. 28	30 May 1968
An Act to restrict the operation of section 15 of the Wills Act 1837. (Note: Wills Act 1837 (7 Will. 4 & 1 Vict. c. 26))
Trade Descriptions Act 1968	1968 c. 29	30 May 1968
An Act to replace the Merchandise Marks Acts 1887 to 1953 by fresh provisions prohibiting misdescriptions of goods, services, accommodation and facilities provided in the course of trade; to prohibit false or misleading indications as to the price of goods; to confer power to require information or instructions relating to goods to be marked on or to accompany the goods or to be included in advertisements; to prohibit the unauthorised use of devices or emblems signifying royal awards; to enable the Parliament of Northern Ireland to make laws relating to merchandise marks; and for purposes connected with those matters.
Air Corporations Act 1968 (repealed)	1968 c. 30	30 May 1968
An Act to raise the limits imposed by section 22 of the Air Corporations Act 1967 (Note: Air Corporations Act 1967 (c. 33)) on the amounts which the British European Airways Corporation may borrow; to authorise the Corporation to borrow from the Board of Trade for the purpose of financing deficits on revenue account and in order to repay sums borrowed for that purpose; and for purposes connected with the matters aforesaid. (Repealed by Air Corporations Act 1969 (c. 43))
Housing (Financial Provisions) (Scotland) Act 1968	1968 c. 31	30 May 1968
An Act to consolidate certain enactments relating to the giving of financial assistance towards the provision or improvement of housing accommodation in Scotland, and to other financial matters connected therewith.
Industrial Expansion Act 1968 (repealed)	1968 c. 32	30 May 1968
An Act to authorise the provision of financial support, pursuant to schemes laid before Parliament, for industrial projects calculated to improve efficiency, create, expand or sustain productive capacity or promote or support technological improvements, and in that connection to extend the powers of the National Research Development Corporation and the Industrial Reorganisation Corporation; to make provision or further provision for financial support for certain other industrial projects and undertakings, and to amend section 7 of the Development of Inventions Act 1967; (Note: Development of Inventions Act 1967 (c. 32)) to modify section 1 of the Civil Aviation Act 1949 (Note: Civil Aviation Act 1949 (12, 13 & 14 Geo. 6. c. 67)) in relation to the purchase of the undertaking of Beagle Aircraft Limited and other transactions; to make further provision with respect to the supply powers of Ministers under the Ministry of Supply Act 1939 (Note: Ministry of Supply Act 1939 (2 & 3 Geo. 6. c. 38)) and to the exercise of functions by the Board of Trade; and for purposes connected with the matters aforesaid. (Repealed by Statute Law (Repeals) Act 1989 (c. 43))
Customs Duties (Dumping and Subsidies) Amendment Act 1968 (repealed)	1968 c. 33	3 July 1968
An Act to make further provision as regards the imposition of duties of customs where goods have been dumped or subsidised, and as regards duties so imposed. (Repealed by Customs Duties (Dumping and Subsidies) Act 1969 (c. 16))
Agriculture (Miscellaneous Provisions) Act 1968	1968 c. 34	3 July 1968
An Act to make further provision with respect to the welfare of livestock; to provide for additional payments for certain tenants of agricultural holdings who receive compensation for disturbance in respect of their holdings or whose land is acquired or taken possession of compulsorily or whose landlords resume possession of the land for non-agricultural purposes; to make further provision with respect to the termination of tenancies of agricultural holdings in Scotland acquired by succession; to make further provision for England and Wales with respect to drainage charges, drainage rates and grants and advances to drainage authorities; to provide for payments in respect of bacon and grants in respect of break crops and the supply of water to certain buildings; to make further provision with respect to the compensation of tenants of agricultural holdings whose land is acquired or taken possession of compulsorily; to amend section 3 of the Parks Regulation (Amendment) Act 1926, (Note: Parks Regulation (Amendment) Act 1926 (16 & 17 Geo. 5. c. 36)) the Agricultural Wages Act 1948 (Note: Agricultural Wages Act 1948 (11 & 12 Geo. 6. c. 47)) and the Agricultural Wages (Scotland) Act 1949, (Note: Agricultural Wages (Scotland) Act 1949 (12, 13 & 14 Geo. 6. c. 30)) the Restrictive Trade Practices Act 1956 (Note: Restrictive Trade Practices Act 1956 (4 & 5 Eliz. 2. c. 68)) in its application to agricultural marketing boards, section 53(2) of the Agricultural Marketing Act 1958, (Note: Agricultural Marketing Act 1958 (6 & 7 Eliz. 2. c. 47)) section 1 of the Agricultural and Forestry Associations Act 1962, (Note: Agricultural and Forestry Associations Act 1962 (10 & 11 Eliz. 2. c. 29)) the Plant Varieties and Seeds Act 1964 (Note: Plant Varieties and Seeds Act 1964 (c. 14)) and section 49 of the Agriculture Act 1967; (Note: Agriculture Act 1967 (c. 22)) and for purposes connected with the matters aforesaid.
Water Resources Act 1968 (repealed)	1968 c. 35	3 July 1968
An Act to amend section 27 of the Water Resources Act 1963 (Note: Water Resources Act 1963 (c. 38)) and for purposes connected therewith. (Repealed by Water Consolidation (Consequential Provisions) Act 1991 (c. 60))
Maintenance Orders Act 1968	1968 c. 36	3 July 1968
An Act to amend the enactments relating to matrimonial, guardianship and affiliation proceedings so far as they limit the weekly rate of the maintenance payments which may be ordered by magistrates' courts.
Education (No. 2) Act 1968	1968 c. 37	3 July 1968
An Act to make further provision for the government and conduct of colleges of education and other institutions of further education maintained by local education authorities, and of special schools so maintained.
Sale of Venison (Scotland) Act 1968	1968 c. 38	3 July 1968
An Act to make provision for the registration of dealers in venison, for the keeping of records by such dealers; and for matters in connection therewith.
Gas and Electricity Act 1968 (repealed)	1968 c. 39	3 July 1968
An Act to increase the statutory limits on the amounts outstanding in respect of borrowings by the Gas Council and Area Gas Boards; to provide for the borrowing by the Electricity Council, the Scottish Electricity Boards and the Gas Council of money in foreign currency; to enable the said Councils and Boards and other electricity authorities to furnish overseas aid; to increase the number of members of the Gas Council; and for connected purposes. (Repealed for Scotland by Electricity (Scotland) Act 1979 (c. 11) and for England and Wales and Northern Ireland by Electricity Act 1989 (c. 29))
Family Allowances and National Insurance Act 1968 (repealed)	1968 c. 40	3 July 1968
An Act to increase family allowances under the Family Allowances Act 1965 and make related adjustments of certain benefits under the National Insurance Act 1965 or the National Insurance (Industrial Injuries) Act 1965, (Note: National Insurance (Industrial Injuries) Act 1965 (c. 52)) and for connected purposes. (Repealed by Social Security (Consequential Provisions) Act 1975 (c. 18))
Countryside Act 1968	1968 c. 41	3 July 1968
An Act to enlarge the functions of the Commission established under the National Parks and Access to the Countryside Act 1949, (Note: National Parks and Access to the Countryside Act 1949 (12, 13 & 14 Geo. 6. c. 97)) to confer new powers on local authorities and other bodies for the conservation and enhancement of natural beauty and for the benefit of those resorting to the countryside and to make other provision for the matters dealt with in the Act of 1949 and generally as respects the countryside, and to amend the law about trees and woodlands, and footpaths and bridleways, and other public paths.
Prices and Incomes Act 1968 (repealed)	1968 c. 42	10 July 1968
An Act to prolong the duration of certain provisions of the Prices and Incomes Acts 1966 (Note: Prices and Incomes Act 1966 (c. 33)) and 1967; (Note: Prices and Incomes Act 1967 (c. 53)) to extend the maximum period for which standstills in prices and charges or terms and conditions of employment may be enforced under the powers of those Acts, and to confer further powers for requiring reductions in prices and charges and for the deferment of wages regulation orders and agricultural wages orders; to limit company distributions; to limit rent increases and mitigate certain past rent increases for dwelling-houses, and to enable rents of local authority housing to be changed without notice to quit being given; and for connected purposes. (Repealed by Housing (Consequential Provisions) Act 1985 (c. 71))
Appropriation Act 1968 (repealed)	1968 c. 43	26 July 1968
An Act to apply a sum out of the Consolidated Fund to the service of the year ending on 31st March 1969, and to appropriate the supplies granted in this Session of Parliament. (Repealed by Appropriation (No. 2) Act 1974 (c. 31))
Finance Act 1968	1968 c. 44	26 July 1968
An Act to grant certain duties, to alter other duties, and to amend the law relating to the National Debt and the Public Revenue, and to make further provision in connection with Finance.
British Standard Time Act 1968 (repealed)	1968 c. 45	26 July 1968
An Act to establish the time for general purposes at one hour in advance of Greenwich mean time throughout the year. (Repealed by Summer Time Act 1972 (c. 6))
Health Services and Public Health Act 1968	1968 c. 46	26 July 1968
An Act to amend the National Health Service Act 1946 (Note: National Health Service Act 1946 (9 & 10 Geo. 6. c. 81)) and the National Health Service (Scotland) Act 1947 (Note: National Health Service (Scotland) Act 1947 (10 & 11 Geo. 6. c. 27)) and make other amendments connected with the national health service; to make amendments connected with local authorities' services under the National Assistance Act 1948; (Note: National Assistance Act 1948 (11 & 12 Geo. 6. c. 29)) to amend the law relating to notifiable diseases and food poisoning; to amend the Nurseries and Child-Minders Regulation Act 1948; (Note: Nurseries and Child-Minders Regulation Act 1948 (11 & 12 Geo. 6. c. 53)) to amend the law relating to food and drugs; to enable assistance to be given to certain voluntary organisations; to enable the Minister of Health and Secretary of State to purchase goods for supply to certain authorities; to make other amendments in the law relating to the public health; and for purposes connected with the matters aforesaid.
Sewerage (Scotland) Act 1968	1968 c. 47	26 July 1968
An Act to make new provision as respects sewerage in Scotland, and for connected purposes.
International Organisations Act 1968	1968 c. 48	26 July 1968
An Act to make new provision (in substitution for the International Organisations (Immunities and Privileges) Act 1950 (Note: International Organisations (Immunities and Privileges) Act 1950 (14 Geo. 6. c. 14)) and the European Coal and Steel Community Act 1955) (Note: European Coal and Steel Community Act 1955 (4 & 5 Eliz. 2. c. 4)) as to privileges, immunities and facilities to be accorded in respect of certain international organisations and in respect of persons connected with such organisations and other persons; and for purposes connected with the matters aforesaid.
Social Work (Scotland) Act 1968	1968 c. 49	26 July 1968
An Act to make further provision for promoting social welfare in Scotland; to consolidate with amendments certain enactments relating to the care and protection of children; to amend the law relating to the supervision and care of persons put on probation or released from prison etc.; to restrict the prosecution of children for offences; to establish children's panels to provide children's hearings in the case of children requiring compulsory measures of care; and for purposes connected with the aforesaid matters.
Hearing Aid Council Act 1968	1968 c. 50	26 July 1968
An Act to provide for the establishment of a Hearing Aid Council, to register persons engaged in the supply of hearing aids, to advise on the training of persons engaged in such business, and to regulate trade practices; and for purposes connected therewith.
Highlands and Islands Development (Scotland) Act 1968 (repealed)	1968 c. 51	26 July 1968
An Act to enable the Highlands and Islands Development Board to form and promote, and to acquire shareholdings in companies carrying on or proposing to carry on business or other activities contributing to the economic or social development of the Highlands and Islands; and for matters connected therewith. (Repealed by Enterprise and New Towns (Scotland) Act 1990 (c. 35))
Caravan Sites Act 1968	1968 c. 52	26 July 1968
An Act to restrict the eviction from caravan sites of occupiers of caravans and make other provision for the benefit of such occupiers; to secure the establishment of such sites by local authorities for the use of gipsies and other persons of nomadic habit, and control in certain areas the unauthorised occupation of land by such persons; to amend the definition of "caravan" in Part I of the Caravan Sites and Control of Development Act 1960; (Note: Caravan Sites and Control of Development Act 1960 (8 & 9 Eliz. 2. c. 62)) and for purposes connected with the matters aforesaid.
Adoption Act 1968 (repealed)	1968 c. 53	26 July 1968
An Act to make provision for extending the powers of courts in the United Kingdom with respect to the adoption of children; for enabling effect to be given in the United Kingdom to adoptions effected in other countries and to determinations of authorities in other countries with respect to adoptions; and for purposes connected with the matters aforesaid. (Repealed for England and Wales by Adoption Act 1976 (c. 36) and for Scotland by Adoption (Scotland) Act 1978 (c. 28))
Theatres Act 1968	1968 c. 54	26 July 1968
An Act to abolish censorship of the theatre and to amend the law in respect of theatres and theatrical performances.
Friendly and Industrial and Provident Societies Act 1968 (repealed)	1968 c. 55	26 July 1968
An Act to make further provision with respect to the accounts of friendly societies and industrial and provident societies and the auditing of those accounts, and with respect to the rules and valuations of friendly societies. (Repealed by Co-operative and Community Benefit Societies Act 2014 (c. 14))
Swaziland Independence Act 1968	1968 c. 56	26 July 1968
An Act to make provision for, and in connection with, the attainment by Swaziland of fully responsible status within the Commonwealth.
Overseas Aid Act 1968 (repealed)	1968 c. 57	26 July 1968
An Act to enable effect to be given to international arrangements for the making of contributions and other payments to the International Development Association and for the making of contributions to any international financial institution established for promoting the economic development of any region of the world; to enable Her Majesty's Government to implement undertakings, given under an international agreement with respect to the Asian Development Bank, to be responsible for the obligations of certain members of the Bank; and to make further provision with respect to the Overseas Service Pensions Scheme. (Repealed by Overseas Development and Co-operation Act 1980 (c. 63))
International Monetary Fund Act 1968	1968 c. 58	26 July 1968
An Act to enable effect to be given to certain amendments of the Articles of Agreement of the International Monetary Fund, and for purposes connected therewith.
Hovercraft Act 1968	1968 c. 59	26 July 1968
An Act to make further provision with respect to hovercraft.
Theft Act 1968	1968 c. 60	26 July 1968
An Act to revise the law of England and Wales as to theft and similar or associated offences, and in connection therewith to make provision as to criminal proceedings by one party to a marriage against the other, and to make certain amendments extending beyond England and Wales in the Post Office Act 1953 (Note: Post Office Act 1953 (1 & 2 Eliz. 2. c. 36)) and other enactments; and for other purposes connected therewith.
Civil Aviation Act 1968	1968 c. 61	25 October 1968
An Act to amend the law relating to aerodromes, aircraft and civil aviation; to enable the Board of Trade to give financial assistance in respect of certain aerodromes; and to extend the powers of the Parliament of Northern Ireland in relation to aerodromes in Northern Ireland.
Clean Air Act 1968 (repealed)	1968 c. 62	25 October 1968
An Act to make further provision for abating the pollution of the air. (Repealed by Clean Air Act 1993 (c. 11))
Domestic and Appellate Proceedings (Restriction of Publicity) Act 1968	1968 c. 63	25 October 1968
An Act to make further provision for enabling courts to sit in private and for preventing or restricting publicity for certain proceedings.
Civil Evidence Act 1968	1968 c. 64	25 October 1968
An Act to amend the law of evidence in relation to civil proceedings, and in respect of the privilege against self-incrimination to make corresponding amendments in relation to statutory powers of inspection or investigation.
Gaming Act 1968 (repealed)	1968 c. 65	25 October 1968
An Act to make further provision with respect to gaming; and for purposes connected therewith. (Repealed by Gambling Act 2005 (c. 19))
Restrictive Trade Practices Act 1968	1968 c. 66	25 October 1968
An Act to amend Part I of the Restrictive Trade Practices Act 1956 and to make further provision as to agreements conflicting with Free Trade agreements.
Medicines Act 1968	1968 c. 67	25 October 1968
An Act to make new provision with respect to medicinal products and related matters, and for purposes connected therewith.
Design Copyright Act 1968 (repealed)	1968 c. 68	25 October 1968
An Act to amend the law relating to the copyright of the design of certain manufactured articles, and for connected purposes. (Repealed by Copyright, Designs and Patents Act 1988 (c. 48))
Justices of the Peace Act 1968	1968 c. 69	25 October 1968
An Act to make further provision for confining the office of justice of the peace to persons selected for it, and terminating the appointment of stipendiary magistrates under local Acts, and for matters arising thereout, and to forward in other respects the proper discharge of the functions of justices by amending the law as to age limits, payment of allowances, powers and qualifications of justices' clerks and their assistants and other matters; and for purposes connected therewith.
Law Reform (Miscellaneous Provisions) (Scotland) Act 1968	1968 c. 70	25 October 1968
An Act to amend the law of Scotland relating to succession to the property of deceased persons in cases of illegitimacy; to confer on illegitimate persons in Scotland the right to legitim out of their deceased parents' estates; to amend the law of Scotland with respect to the construction of certain provisions made by deed or otherwise; to extend the provisions of the Succession (Scotland) Act 1964 (Note: Succession (Scotland) Act 1964 (c. 41)) to tenancies of crofts; to amend the law of evidence in civil proceedings in Scotland; to re-enact, with amendments, the provisions of certain enactments relating to the duration of liferents in Scotland; to amend section 15(1) of the Succession (Scotland) Act 1964; further to amend the law of Scotland relating to prorogation of the jurisdiction of the sheriff court; to remove a restriction on the extent of land in Scotland which a trade union may purchase or take upon lease and otherwise deal with; and for purposes connected with the matters aforesaid.
Race Relations Act 1968	1968 c. 71	25 October 1968
An Act to make fresh provision with respect to discrimination on racial grounds, and to make provision with respect to relations between people of different racial origins.
Town and Country Planning Act 1968 (repealed)	1968 c. 72	25 October 1968
An Act to amend the law relating to town and country planning, the compulsory acquisition of land and the disposal of land by public authorities; to make provision for grants for research relating to, and education with respect to, the planning and design of the physical environment; to extend the purposes for which Exchequer contributions may be made under the Town Development Act 1952; (Note: Town Development Act 1952 (15 & 16 Geo. 6 & 1 Eliz. 2. c. 54)) and for connected purposes. (Repealed by Planning (Consequential Provisions) Act 1990 (c. 11))
Transport Act 1968	1968 c. 73	25 October 1968
An Act to make further provision with respect to transport and related matters.
Customs (Import Deposits) Act 1968 (repealed)	1968 c. 74	5 December 1968
An Act to grant a new duty of customs repayable after a specified period. (Repealed by Statute Law (Repeals) Act 1975 (c. 10))
Miscellaneous Financial Provisions Act 1968	1968 c. 75	18 December 1968
An Act to provide for increasing the capital of the Civil Contingencies Fund; to provide for making payments to the Governments of Northern Ireland and the Isle of Man in respect of revenue from the continental shelf; and to enable the Industrial Reorganisation Corporation to borrow in currencies other than sterling.
Expiring Laws Continuance Act 1968 (repealed)	1968 c. 76	18 December 1968
An Act to continue certain expiring laws. (Repealed by Statute Law (Repeals) Act 1971 (c. 52))
Sea Fisheries Act 1968	1968 c. 77	18 December 1968
An Act to make further provision with respect to the subsidies payable to, and the levies which may be imposed on, the white fish and herring industries, to make further provision for the regulation of sea fishing, to amend the Sea Fisheries (Shellfish) Act 1967 (Note: Sea Fisheries (Shellfish) Act 1967 (c. 83)) and the Sea Fish (Conservation) Act 1967, (Note: Sea Fish (Conservation) Act 1967 (c. 84)) to make provision with respect to fishing boats and gear lost or abandoned at sea, to remove anomalies in certain enactments relating to sea fisheries and the white fish and herring industries and to repeal other such enactments which are obsolete or unnecessary; and for connected purposes.

== Local acts ==
Short title	Citation	Royal assent
Long title
Airdrie Court House Commissioners (Dissolution) Order Confirmation Act 1968 (repealed)	1968 c. i	13 March 1968
An Act to confirm a Provisional Order under the Private Legislation Procedure (Scotland) Act 1936, (Note: Private Legislation Procedure (Scotland) Act 1936 (26 Geo. 5 & 1 Edw. 8. c. 52)) relating to the Airdrie Court House Commissioners (Dissolution). (Repealed by Statute Law (Repeals) Act 1998 (c. 43))
	Airdrie Court House Commissioners (Dissolution) Order 1968 Provisional Order to provide for the cesser of the functions of the Airdrie Court House Commissioners and the dissolution of the said Commissioners; and for purposes connected therewith.	
Brighton Marina Act 1968	1968 c. ii	10 April 1968
An Act to authorise the Brighton Marina Company Limited to construct works; and for other purposes.
Epping Forest (Waterworks Corner) Act 1968	1968 c. iii	10 April 1968
An Act to empower the Conservators of Epping Forest to grant to the Minister of Transport lands for road purposes and to acquire lands in exchange; and for other purposes.
Scottish Life Assurance Company Act 1968	1968 c. iv	8 May 1968
An Act to incorporate The Scottish Life Assurance Company and to provide for the control and management of the Company as a mutual assurance company; to transfer to the Company the assets of The Scottish Life Assurance Company Limited; to provide for compensating the holders of share capital of the Limited Company and to dissolve the Limited Company; and for other purposes.
Saint Mary, Summerstown Act 1968	1968 c. v	8 May 1968
An Act to authorise the sale of the site of the former church of Saint Mary, Summerstown in the London borough of Wandsworth; to free the said land from the restrictions attaching to it as a site of a church; and for other purposes.
Mill Lane, Kirk Ella, Burial Ground Act 1968	1968 c. vi	30 May 1968
An Act to authorise the removal of certain restrictions attaching to land adjoining Mill Lane Cemetery, Kirk Ella, in the East Riding of the county of York; to authorise the use of the land for building purposes or otherwise; and for other purposes.
All Saints, Streatham, Act 1968	1968 c. vii	30 May 1968
An Act to provide for the disposition of the church of All Saints, Streatham, and the use for other purposes thereof; and for purposes incidental thereto.
Holy Trinity, West Hampstead Act 1968	1968 c. viii	30 May 1968
An Act to provide for the demolition of the church of Holy Trinity, West Hampstead and for the erection of a new church in place thereof, a church hall and other buildings; to authorise the use for other purposes of part of the site of the present church; and for purposes incidental thereto.
University of Salford Act 1968	1968 c. ix	30 May 1968
An Act to dissolve the Royal College of Advanced Technology Salford and to transfer all the rights, property, privileges, liabilities and engagements of that college to The University of Salford; to provide for the pooling of investments and moneys of certain endowment funds of The University of Salford; and for other purposes.
Royal College of Art Act 1968	1968 c. x	30 May 1968
An Act to dissolve The Royal College of Art incorporated under the Companies Act, 1948, (Note: Companies Act 1948 (11 & 12 Geo. 6. c. 38)) as a company limited by guarantee and to transfer all the rights, property and liabilities of that college to The Royal College of Art constituted by Royal Charter; and for other purposes.
Christ Church with Saint Andrew and Saint Michael, East Greenwich Act 1968	1968 c. xi	30 May 1968
An Act to authorise the demolition of the church of Christ Church and the church of Saint Andrew and Saint Michael, East Greenwich; to provide for the construction of a new parish church for the parish of Christ Church with Saint Andrew and Saint Michael, East Greenwich; to authorise the use for other purposes of the site of the said church of Saint Andrew and Saint Michael and part of the site of the said church of Christ Church; and for purposes incidental thereto.
Mersey Tunnel (Liverpool/Wallasey) Act 1968	1968 c. xii	30 May 1968
An Act to authorise the construction of a tunnel under the river Mersey between Liverpool and Wallasey; and for other purposes.
Salvation Army Act 1968	1968 c. xiii	30 May 1968
An Act to amend the Salvation Army Act, 1931; (Note: Salvation Army Act 1931 (21 & 22 Geo. 5. c. xciv)) to make provision for the management of trusts connected with or related to the interests, aims or purposes of the Salvation Army; and for other purposes.
Thames Valley Water Act 1968	1968 c. xiv	3 July 1968
An Act to empower the Thames Valley Water Board to construct a service reservoir and to acquire lands; and for other purposes.
Saint George, Botolph Lane Churchyard Act 1968	1968 c. xv	3 July 1968
An Act to free the churchyard appurtenant to the former church of Saint George, Botolph Lane in the city of London from the restrictions attaching to it as a disused burial ground in the city of London; to authorise the disposition thereof and the use thereof for other purposes; and for purposes incidental thereto.
Birmingham Corporation Act 1968 (repealed)	1968 c. xvi	3 July 1968
An Act to empower the lord mayor, aldermen and citizens of the city of Birmingham to make payments to or on behalf of tenants of certain dwelling-houses in the said city in respect of the rents thereof; and for other purposes. (Repealed by West Midlands County Council Act 1980 (c. xi))
University of Wales Institute of Science and Technology Act 1968	1968 c. xvii	3 July 1968
An Act to dissolve the Welsh College of Advanced Technology and to transfer all the rights, property and liabilities of that college to the University of Wales Institute of Science and Technology (Athrofa Gwyddoniaeth a Thechnoleg Prifysgol Cymru); to provide for the pooling of investments and moneys of certain endowment funds of that Institute; and for other purposes.
London Transport Act 1968	1968 c. xviii	3 July 1968
An Act to empower the London Transport Board to construct works and to acquire lands; to extend the time for the compulsory purchase of certain lands and the completion of certain works; to confer further powers on the Board; and for other purposes.
Felixstowe Dock and Railway Act 1968	1968 c. xix	3 July 1968
An Act to empower the Felixstowe Dock and Railway Company to construct works and to acquire lands; to abandon certain of the works authorised by the Felixstowe Dock and Railway Act, 1963; (Note: Felixstowe Dock and Railway Act 1963 (c. xxxvi)) to extend and alter the limits of the dock; to authorise the raising of additional capital; to confer further powers on the Company; and for other purposes.
Durban Navigation Collieries Act 1968	1968 c. xx	3 July 1968
An Act to make provision for the transfer to the Republic of South Africa of the registered office of The Durban Navigation Collieries Limited for the purpose of enabling that company to assume South African nationality, for the cesser of application to that company of provisions of the Companies Acts 1948 to 1967 consequent upon such assumption; and for other purposes incidental thereto.
Saint James and Saint Paul, Plumstead Act 1968	1968 c. xxi	3 July 1968
An Act to provide for the disposal of the churches of Saint James, Plumstead and Saint Paul, Plumstead; the use for other purposes of the sites of the said churches and adjacent lands; and for purposes incidental thereto.
Ministry of Housing and Local Government Provisional Orders Confirmation (Blackpool and Stourbridge) Act 1968 (repealed)	1968 c. xxii	26 July 1968
An Act to confirm Provisional Orders of the Minister of Housing and Local Government relating to the county borough of Blackpool and the borough of Stourbridge. (Repealed by County of Lancashire Act 1984 (c. xxi))
	Blackpool Order 1968 Provisional Order amending a Local Act. (Note: Blackpool Improvement Act 1901 (1 Edw. 7. c. cxxviii))	
	Stourbridge Order 1968 Provisional Order amending a Local Act. (Note: Stourbridge Improvement Act 1866 (29 & 30 Vict. c. clxix))	
Ministry of Housing and Local Government Provisional Order Confirmation (West Kent Main Sewerage District) Act 1968	1968 c. xxiii	26 July 1968
An Act to confirm a Provisional Order of the Minister of Housing and Local Government relating to the West Kent Main Sewerage District.
	West Kent Main Sewerage Order 1968 Provisional Order repealing and amending certain Local Acts and Confirming Acts.	
Crosby Corporation Act 1968	1968 c. xxiv	26 July 1968
An Act to empower the mayor, aldermen and burgesses of the borough of Crosby to construct works and to acquire lands; to confer further powers upon the Corporation; and for other purposes.
Greater London Council (Vauxhall Cross Improvement) Act 1968	1968 c. xxv	26 July 1968
An Act to empower the Greater London Council to execute street and other works and to acquire lands, to confer further powers on the Greater London Council; and for other purposes.
Ely Ouse-Essex Water Act 1968	1968 c. xxvi	26 July 1968
An Act to provide for the transfer of water from the Ely Ouse river in the area of the Great Ouse River Authority to the area of the Essex River Authority; to authorise the Great Ouse River Authority and the Essex River Authority to acquire lands and to construct works; and for other purposes.
Great Northern London Cemetery Company Act 1968 (repealed)	1968 c. xxvii	26 July 1968
An Act to authorise the Great Northern London Cemetery Company to sell certain land belonging to the said Company free from restrictions; to authorise the erection of buildings thereon; and for other purposes. (Repealed by Great Northern London Cemetery Act 1976 (c. xxvii))
Hounslow Corporation Act 1968	1968 c. xxviii	26 July 1968
An Act to confer further powers on the mayor, aldermen and burgesses of the London borough of Hounslow in relation to lands and streets; to empower them to establish an undertaking for the supply of heat; to confer further powers on them in relation to the management and control of their market undertaking; to make further provision for the finances, improvement, local government and health of the borough; and for other purposes.
Lancashire County Council (General Powers) Act 1968 (repealed)	1968 c. xxix	26 July 1968
An Act to confer further powers on the County Council of the Administrative County of the County Palatine of Lancaster and on local authorities in relation to lands, industrial development and highways and the local government, improvement, health and finances of the County Palatine of Lancaster; and for other purposes. (Repealed by County of Lancashire Act 1984 (c. xxi))
Mersey Docks and Harbour Board Act 1968 (repealed)	1968 c. xxx	26 July 1968
An Act to increase the borrowing powers of the Mersey Docks and Harbour Board; and for other purposes. (Repealed by Mersey Docks and Harbour Act 1971 (c. lvii))
Mid-Glamorgan Water Act 1968	1968 c. xxxi	26 July 1968
An Act to authorise the Mid-Glamorgan Water Board to construct works and to acquire lands; and for other purposes.
Port of London Act 1968	1968 c. xxxii	26 July 1968
An Act to consolidate with amendments the statutory provisions relating to the Port of London Authority; and for other purposes.
Medway Water (Bewl Bridge Reservoir) Act 1968	1968 c. xxxiii	26 July 1968
An Act to authorise the Medway Water Board to construct works and to acquire lands; to empower the Board and the Mid Kent Water Company to enter into agreements for certain purposes; and for other purposes.
British Railways Act 1968	1968 c. xxxiv	26 July 1968
An Act to empower the British Railways Board to construct works and to acquire lands; to extend the time for the compulsory purchase of certain lands and the completion of certain works; to confer further powers on the Board; and for other purposes.
British Railways (Mersey Railway Extensions) Act 1968	1968 c. xxxv	26 July 1968
An Act to empower the British Railways Board to construct works and to acquire lands; and for other purposes.
Cheshire County Council Act 1968	1968 c. xxxvi	26 July 1968
An Act to make provision in relation to the offices of chairman and deputy chairman of the Cheshire Court of Quarter Sessions; to confer further powers on the Cheshire County Council and local authorities in the administrative county of the county palatine of Chester in relation to amenities, lands, industrial development and highways and the local government, improvement, health and finances of the county; to enact provisions with respect to tattooists; to make further provisions for the superannuation of employees; and for other purposes.
City of London (Various Powers) Act 1968	1968 c. xxxvii	26 July 1968
An Act to make further provision with respect to the discharge of electoral duties in the city of London; the provision of facilities at the Central Criminal Court and other places in the city; the investment of moneys by the Corporation of London; and for other purposes.
Durham County Council Act 1968	1968 c. xxxviii	26 July 1968
An Act to confer further powers on the Durham County Council and on local, highway and other authorities in the administrative county of Durham in relation to lands, amenities, highways and the local government, improvement, health and finances of the county and of the boroughs and districts therein; to make further provision with reference to the Tyne Tunnel and for other purposes.
Greater London Council (General Powers) Act 1968	1968 c. xxxix	26 July 1968
An Act to confer further powers upon the Greater London Council and other authorities; and for other purposes.
Leicester Corporation Act 1968	1968 c. xl	26 July 1968
An Act to confer further powers on the lord mayor, aldermen and citizens of the city of Leicester, to make further provision with regard to the health, local government, welfare, improvement and finances of the city; and for other purposes.
Greater London Council (Money) Act 1968	1968 c. xli	26 July 1968
An Act to regulate the expenditure on capital account and on lending to other persons by the Greater London Council during the financial period from 1st April 1968 to 30th September 1969; and for other purposes.
Newcastle upon Tyne Corporation Act 1968	1968 c. xlii	25 October 1968
An Act to confer further powers upon the lord mayor, aldermen and citizens of the city and county of Newcastle upon Tyne, to make further provision with regard to the health, local government, welfare, improvement and finances of the city; and for other purposes.
Royal Bank of Scotland Order Confirmation Act 1968 (repealed)	1968 c. xliii	5 December 1968
An Act to confirm a Provisional Order under the Private Legislation Procedure (Scotland) Act 1936, relating to the Royal Bank of Scotland. (Repealed by Royal Bank of Scotland Order Confirmation Act 1970 (c. iii))
	Royal Bank of Scotland Order 1968 Provisional Order to abolish the offices of governor, deputy governor and extraordinary director of the Royal Bank of Scotland; to amend the Royal Charters and Acts of Parliament relating to the Bank; and for other purposes.	
Advocates' Widows' and Orphans' Fund Order Confirmation Act 1968	1968 c. xliv	18 December 1968
An Act to confirm a Provisional Order under the Private Legislation Procedure (Scotland) Act 1936, relating to the Advocates' Widows' and Orphans' Fund.
	Advocates' Widows' and Orphans' Fund Order 1968 Provisional Order to make provision in relation to the regulation and control of the Advocates' Widows' Fund, to repeal the Advocates' Widows' Fund Acts, 1830 to 1956, and for other purposes.	

== See also ==
- List of acts of the Parliament of the United Kingdom
