= Criminal Appeal (Northern Ireland) Act 1980 =

Act of the Parliament of the United Kingdom

Criminal Appeal (Northern Ireland) Act 1980 (Note: Section 52(1).)
- Act of Parliament
- Parliament of the United Kingdom
- Long title: An Act to consolidate the Criminal Appeal (Northern Ireland) Act 1968 and related enactments.
- Citation: 1980 c. 47
- Territorial extent: United Kingdom

Dates
- Royal assent: 1 August 1980
- Commencement: 1 September 1980 (Note: Section 52(2).)
Other legislation
Amends	See § Repealed enactments
Repeals/revokes	See § Repealed enactments
Amended by	Transfer of Functions (Legal Aid and Maintenance Orders) (Northern Ireland) Order 1982; Mental Health (Northern Ireland) Order 1986; Criminal Justice Act 1988; Treatment of Offenders (Northern Ireland) Order 1989; Northern Ireland (Emergency Provisions) Act 1991; Criminal Justice Act 1993; Criminal Justice (Northern Ireland) Order 1994; Criminal Appeal Act 1995; Criminal Justice (Northern Ireland) Order 1996; Criminal Justice (Children) (Northern Ireland) Order 1998; Justice (Northern Ireland) Act 2002; Courts Act 2003; Criminal Justice Act 2003; Access to Justice (Northern Ireland) Order 2003; Domestic Violence, Crime and Victims Act 2004; Criminal Justice (Northern Ireland) Order 2004; Criminal Justice (Evidence) (Northern Ireland) Order 2004; Constitutional Reform Act 2005; Serious Crime Act 2007; Criminal Justice and Immigration Act 2008; Criminal Justice (Northern Ireland) Order 2008; Coroners and Justice Act 2009; Northern Ireland Act 1998 (Devolution of Policing and Justice Functions) Order 2010; Justice Act (Northern Ireland) 2011; Serious Crime Act 2015; Justice Act (Northern Ireland) 2016; Criminal Justice (Committal Reform) Act (Northern Ireland) 2022
Relates to	Criminal Appeal (Northern Ireland) Act 1968; Criminal Appeal Act 1968

Status: Amended

Text of statute as originally enacted

Revised text of statute as amended

Text of the Criminal Appeal (Northern Ireland) Act 1980 as in force today (including any amendments) within the United Kingdom, from legislation.gov.uk.

The Criminal Appeal (Northern Ireland) Act 1980 (c. 47) is an act of the Parliament of the United Kingdom that consolidated the Criminal Appeal (Northern Ireland) Act 1968 and related enactments relating to criminal appeals in Northern Ireland.

== Provisions ==
=== Repealed enactments ===
Section 51(2) of the act repealed 12 enactments, listed in schedule 5 to the act.

Enactments repealed by section 51(2)
Citation	Short title	Extent of repeal
Acts of the Parliament of the United Kingdom
1968 c. 21	Criminal Appeal (Northern Ireland) Act 1968	The whole act.
1972 c. 71	Criminal Justice Act 1972	Section 63(3).
1972 c. 71	Criminal Justice Act 1972	In section 66(6)(b) the words "nor the corresponding section referred to in section 63(3)".
1972 c. 71	Criminal Justice Act 1972	Schedule 4.
1973 c. 15	Administration of Justice Act 1973	In section 18(2) paragraph (a) and in paragraph (c) the words "(a) or".
1977 c. 45	Criminal Law Act 1977	In section 44 the words "and in section 9 of the Criminal Appeal (Northern Ireland) Act 1968".
1977 c. 45	Criminal Law Act 1977	In section 65(10)(b) the words "section 44".
1978 c. 23	Judicature (Northern Ireland) Act 1978	In section 36—(a) in subsection (1) the words "or reference" in the second place where they occur; (b) in subsections (2) and (3) the word "reference"; (c) in subsection (4), paragraphs (a) and (c); (d) subsection (5).
1978 c. 23	Judicature (Northern Ireland) Act 1978	In section 37—(a) subsection (1); (b) in subsection (3) the words from the beginning to "section 36 and".
1978 c. 23	Judicature (Northern Ireland) Act 1978	Section 39.
1978 c. 23	Judicature (Northern Ireland) Act 1978	Section 40.
1978 c. 23	Judicature (Northern Ireland) Act 1978	In Schedule 5 the entries relating to the Criminal Appeal (Northern Ireland) Act 1968 and the Administration of Justice Act 1973.
Acts of the Parliament of Northern Ireland
1966 c. 20 (N.I.)	Criminal Justice Act (Northern Ireland) 1966	Section 21.
1966 c. 20 (N.I.)	Criminal Justice Act (Northern Ireland) 1966	Schedule 2.
1968 c. 10 (N.I.)	Costs in Criminal Cases Act (Northern Ireland) 1968	Section 9(b).
1968 c. 29 (N.I.)	Treatment of Offenders Act (Northern Ireland) 1968	Section 29.
1969 c. 16 (N.I.)	Theft Act (Northern Ireland) 1969	Section 27(5).
Statutory Instruments
SI 1973/2163	Northern Ireland (Modification of Enactments—No. 1) Order 1973	In Schedule 1 the entry relating to the Criminal Appeal (Northern Ireland) Act 1968.
SI 1973/2163	Northern Ireland (Modification of Enactments—No. 1) Order 1973	In Schedule 5, paragraph 19.
SI 1976/226 (N.I. 4)	Treatment of Offenders (Northern Ireland) Order 1976	In Article 9(6) the words "or (5)(b)" and "or (5)(a)".
SI 1980/704 (N.I. 6)	Criminal Justice (Northern Ireland) Order 1980	Article 4(1).
SI 1980/704 (N.I. 6)	Criminal Justice (Northern Ireland) Order 1980	In Schedule 1, paragraphs 44, 45 and 46.
