= Domestic Violence, Crime and Victims Act 2004 =

Act of the Parliament of the United Kingdom

Domestic Violence, Crime and Victims Act 2004 (Note: Section 63.)
- Act of Parliament
- Parliament of the United Kingdom
- Long title: An Act to amend Part 4 of the Family Law Act 1996, the Protection from Harassment Act 1997 and the Protection from Harassment (Northern Ireland) Order 1998; to make provision about homicide; to make common assault an arrestable offence; to make provision for the payment of surcharges by offenders; to make provision about alternative verdicts; to provide for a procedure under which a jury tries only sample counts on an indictment; to make provision about findings of unfitness to plead and about persons found unfit to plead or not guilty by reason of insanity; to make provision about the execution of warrants; to make provision about the enforcement of orders imposed on conviction; to amend section 58 of the Criminal Justice Act 2003 and to amend Part 12 of that Act in relation to intermittent custody; to make provision in relation to victims of offences, witnesses of offences and others affected by offences; and to make provision about the recovery of compensation from offenders.
- Citation: 2004 c. 28
- Territorial extent: England and Wales; Northern Ireland (in part); (Note: Section 62.)

Dates
- Royal assent: 15 November 2004
- Commencement: Various (Note: Section 60.)
Other legislation
Amends	Colonial Prisoners Removal Act 1884; Children and Young Persons Act 1933; Criminal Procedure (Insanity) Act 1964; Parliamentary Commissioner Act 1967; Criminal Law Act 1967; Criminal Appeal Act 1968; Courts-Martial (Appeals) Act 1968; Children and Young Persons Act (Northern Ireland) 1968; Administration of Justice Act 1970; Juries Act 1974; Rehabilitation of Offenders Act 1974; Magistrates' Courts Act 1980; Criminal Appeal (Northern Ireland) Act 1980; Senior Courts Act 1981; Criminal Justice Act 1982; Representation of the People Act 1983; Mental Health Act 1983; Police and Criminal Evidence Act 1984; Prosecution of Offences Act 1985; Mental Health (Northern Ireland) Order 1986; Coroners Act 1988; Criminal Justice Act 1988; Road Traffic Offenders Act 1988; Police and Criminal Evidence (Northern Ireland) Order 1989; Criminal Justice Act 1991; Criminal Procedure (Insanity and Unfitness to Plead) Act 1991; Criminal Appeal Act 1995; Criminal Injuries Compensation Act 1995; Family Law Act 1996; Law Reform (Year and a Day Rule) Act 1996; Armed Forces Act 1996; Protection from Harassment Act 1997; Crime (Sentences) Act 1997; Protection from Harassment (Northern Ireland) Order 1997; Crime and Disorder Act 1998; Access to Justice Act 1999; Powers of Criminal Courts (Sentencing) Act 2000; Care Standards Act 2000; Criminal Justice and Court Services Act 2000; Criminal Justice and Police Act 2001; Justice (Northern Ireland) Act 2002; Sexual Offences Act 2003; Criminal Justice Act 2003
Amended by	Serious Organised Crime and Police Act 2005; Management of Offenders etc. (Scotland) Act 2005; Courts Act 2003 (Consequential Provisions) Order 2005; National Health Service (Consequential Provisions) Act 2006; Road Safety Act 2006; Armed Forces Act 2006; Collection of Fines (Final Scheme) Order 2006; Justice and Security (Northern Ireland) Act 2007; Mental Health Act 2007; Secretary of State for Justice Order 2007; Police and Criminal Evidence (Amendment) (Northern Ireland) Order 2007; Offender Management Act 2007 (Consequential Amendments) Order 2008; Transfer of Tribunal Functions Order 2008; Legislative Reform (Health and Safety Executive) Order 2008; Coroners and Justice Act 2009; Northern Ireland Act 1998 (Devolution of Policing and Justice Functions) Order 2010; Health and Social Care Act 2012; Legal Aid, Sentencing and Punishment of Offenders Act 2012; Domestic Violence, Crime and Victims (Amendment) Act 2012; Crime and Courts Act 2013; Public Bodies (Abolition of Victims’ Advisory Panel) Order 2013; Energy Act 2013 (Office for Nuclear Regulation) (Consequential Amendments, Transitional Provisions and Savings) Order 2014; Criminal Justice and Courts Act 2015; Justice Act (Northern Ireland) 2015; Data Protection Act 2018; Counter-Terrorism and Border Security Act 2019; Sentencing (Pre-consolidation Amendments) Act 2020; Sentencing Act 2020; Counter-Terrorism and Sentencing Act 2021; Domestic Abuse Act 2021; Police, Crime, Sentencing and Courts Act 2022; Health and Care Act 2022; Health and Social Care Act (Northern Ireland) 2022; Health and Social Care Act (Northern Ireland) 2022 (Consequential Amendments) Order 2022; Criminal Justice Act 2003 (Commencement No. 33) and Sentencing Act 2020 (Commencement No. 2) Regulations 2022; Judicial Review and Courts Act 2022 (Magistrates’ Court Sentencing Powers) Regulations 2023; Victims and Prisoners Act 2024; Victims and Courts Act 2026

Status: Amended

Text of statute as originally enacted

Revised text of statute as amended

The Domestic Violence, Crime and Victims Act 2004 (c. 28) is an act of the Parliament of the United Kingdom. It is concerned with criminal justice and concentrates upon legal protection and assistance to victims of crime, particularly domestic violence. It also expands the provision for trials without a jury, brings in new rules for trials for causing the death of a child or vulnerable adult, and permits bailiffs to use force to enter homes.

== Origins ==
- The Home Office White Paper Justice for All (Cm 5563) - many of whose recommendations were implemented in the Criminal Justice Act 2003.
- The Home Office consultation paper Safety and Justice: the Government's Proposals on Domestic Violence (Cm 5847), published in June 2003.
- The Home Office policy leaflet "A Better Deal for Victims and Witnesses", published on 21 November 2002.
- National Society for the Protection of Children ("NSPCC") "Which of you did it?" Working Group Report, published in Autumn 2003.
- The Law Commission report: Children: their non-accidental death or serious injury (criminal trials) (LC282), published on 16 September 2003.
- The Law Commission consultative report Children: their non-accidental death or serious injury (criminal trials) - a consultative report (LC279), published on 15 April 2003.
- The Law Commission report: [The Effective Prosecution of Multiple Offending] (LC277), published in October 2002.
- The Law Commission report: Double Jeopardy and Prosecution Appeals (LC267), published in March 2001.

== Provisions ==
=== Non-molestation orders ===
Non-molestation orders under the Family Law Act 1996 were amended to provide a criminal sanction for non-compliance, with a maximum sentence of 5 years' imprisonment. The circumstances in which such orders could be imposed was extended to include same-sex couples and cohabiting couples on an equal footing with married couples. Former cohabitants are also included.

=== Restraining orders ===
Restraining orders (preventing the recipient from doing anything specified in the order) can be imposed upon acquitted defendants. They are imposed if the court "considers it necessary to do so to protect a person from harassment by the defendant". The Court of Appeal in allowing an appeal against conviction may also remit the matter to the Crown Court to consider a restraining order in respect of the otherwise successful appellant.

=== Common assault ===
The act deemed common assault an arrestable offence. The practical effect of this change was that the police could arrest a suspect at the scene without a warrant, rather than potentially be compelled to leave the suspected assailant with his or her alleged victim. Previously the police would have to allege assault occasioning actual bodily harm, which was arrestable, in order to detain the suspected assailant in borderline cases.

However, the concept of "arrestable offence" was abolished on 1 January 2006. As of 2007, police can effect an arrest, even in the case of suspected common assault, in order "to prevent the person in question causing physical injury to himself or any other person."

The act specified common assault as an alternative verdict to a count on an aggravated assault in the Crown Court, though it is not itself an indictable offence.

=== Fitness to plead ===
Judges, not a specially empanelled jury, are given the powers to decide if a defendant is fit to plead. The regime for dealing with defendants who are unfit to plead or not guilty by reason of insanity (that is, committed the physical acts constituting the offence but without the sane intent) has also been modified. The court, not the Home Secretary, makes the assessment (requiring medical evidence to do so) whether the defendant should be committed to a psychiatric hospital.

=== Trial by jury of sample counts only ===
Trials with a substantial number of charges can now be split into two phases: trial by jury of "specimen counts" and judge-only trial of the remaining counts. This further expands the circumstances in which trials can be heard without a jury (see the Criminal Justice Act 2003).

The prosecution must satisfy the court that three conditions are met:

- given the number of counts, a trial by jury involving all of them would be impracticable
- each count or group of counts to be tried by a jury can be regarded as a sample of counts for judge-only trial
- it is in the interests of justice

The judge should take into account any ways that jury trial can be made easier, but no such measure should result in a trial where the defendant faces a lesser sentence than would be available with the new measures.

=== Causing or allowing the death of a child or vulnerable adult ===
==== Previous difficulties with the law ====
An intractable legal problem had arisen in relation to cases where a child or vulnerable adult cared for by two people dies as a result of ill-treatment. It is known that at least one of two people is responsible, but not which. This problem had been analysed in a number of cases. The Court of Appeal in Lane v Lane held that neither person could be convicted, nor the trial proceed past the end of the prosecution case, because there was no evidence specifically pointing to a certain defendant.

Lord Goddard earlier commented in Regina v Abbott

"Probably one or other must have committed it, but there was not evidence which, and although it is unfortunate that a guilty party cannot be brought to justice, it is far more important that there should not be a miscarriage of justice and that the law maintained that the prosecution should prove its case."

The Law Commission's report commented that this meant one or other parent were potentially "getting away with murder".

The Act deals with the problem in two ways: firstly by creating an offence of "causing or allowing the death of a child or vulnerable adult", and secondly by amending the rules of court procedure to require joint defendants to give their account of events in the witness box, effectively forcing them to incriminate the other if appropriate.

==== The new offence ====
The offence of "causing or allowing the death of a child or vulnerable adult", now referred to as the "new offence", is committed under section 5 of the Act if the following four conditions apply:

- A child or vulnerable adult dies as a result of an unlawful act of a person in the "same household"
- The defendant was also member of the same household, with frequent contact with the victim, and present at the time of the unlawful act
- There was a risk of serious physical harm to the victim at the time
- Either:
  - The defendant did the unlawful act (that is, directly caused the death), or
  - Was aware of the risk (or ought to have been), didn't take reasonable steps to do anything about it, and foresaw the circumstances which led up to the unlawful act causing death

Therefore if it can be established that a child or vulnerable adult died as a result of an unlawful act, it need not be proved which of the two responsible members of the household either caused the death or allowed it to happen.

If there was no obvious history of violence, or any reason to suspect it, then the other members of the household would not be guilty of this offence, even in clear cases of homicide. Where there is no reason to suspect the victim is at risk, other members of the household cannot reasonably be expected to have taken steps to prevent the abuse.

=== New procedure ===
Court procedure is amended to restrict the circumstances in which the trial can be stopped at the end of the prosecution case and before the defence case.

The ambit of the "adverse inference" (right of the jury to make assumptions about any part of the case, including the guilt of the defendant, based upon his or her failure to answer any question put in court) is extended to include an inference on a joint charge of homicide (murder and manslaughter) and the new offence; this means that if a person is charged with either (or both) homicide offences and this new offence, then silence in the witness box can imply guilt of homicide as well as the new offence. This is subject to the usual safeguard that a person cannot be convicted solely upon the basis of their silence.

The point at which a "no case to answer" submission (see definition) can be made has in certain circumstances been moved to the end of the whole case, not just the prosecution. Joint charges of homicide and the new offence can only be dismissed at the end of the whole case (if the new offence has survived past that stage as well).

The new offence will survive the "no case to answer" test as long as the fundamentals of the offence are demonstrated - the prosecution do not have to show whether the defendant caused or allowed the death to happen. The defendant will be under pressure to give evidence about what occurred - not to do so would result in the adverse inference being drawn.

=== Bailiff powers ===
The act permits bailiffs to use force to enter homes, overturning a centuries-old doctrine, confirmed by Semayne's case (1604), that "an Englishman's home is his castle". This had been described in the eighteenth century by William Blackstone, who wrote in Book 4, Chapter 16 of his Commentaries on the Laws of England:

And the law of England has so particular and tender a regard to the immunity of a man's house, that it stiles it his castle, and will never suffer it to be violated with immunity: agreeing herein with the sentiments of ancient Rome, as expressed in the works of Tully; quid enim sanctius, quid omni religione munitius, quam domus unusquisque civium? For this reason no doors can in general be broken open to execute any civil process; though, in criminal causes, the public safety supersedes the private. Hence also in part arises the animadversion of the law upon eaves-droppers, nusancers, and incendiaries: and to this principal it must be assigned, that a man may assemble people together lawfully without danger of raising a riot, rout, or unlawful assembly, in order to protect and defend his house; which he is not permitted to do in any other case.

In 2009 charities providing advice to debtors said they were seeing bailiffs threatening to break in unless the debtor paid the full fine immediately, as well court and bailiff costs. Previously, charities had been able to advise debtors that bailiffs did not have the right to force entry, and the fine could be referred back to the courts and affordable payment schedules worked out.

== Reception ==
The Conservative spokesperson on women's matters, Caroline Spelman was supportive of the legislation.

A number of issues have been pointed out by legal scholars with the current drafting. David Ormerod, writing in the criminal law textbook Smith and Hogan, notes that the Act deliberately does not define what counts as a "household". Additionally, the Act does not adequately cover some classes of carers who do not live in a household residence but have regular contact—domestic nannies, for instance. The law also leaves unclear whether one carer is legally responsible for not taking steps to protect a vulnerable victim from the risky behaviour of another of his or her carers.

== Amendment ==
The 2004 act was amended by the Domestic Violence, Crime and Victims (Amendment) Act 2012. The 2012 act included provisions to prevent individuals, who abuse a child in their care, from being acquitted by blaming each other. The 2012 act also widened the definition of the offence to apply to victims under the age of 18.

== Section 60 – Commencement ==
The following orders have been made under this section:

- The Domestic Violence, Crime and Victims Act 2004 (Commencement No. 1) Order 2005 (SI 2005/579 (C. 26))
- The Domestic Violence, Crime and Victims Act 2004 (Commencement No. 2) Order 2005 (SI 2005/1705 (C. 71))
- The Domestic Violence, Crime and Victims Act 2004 (Commencement No. 3) Order 2005 (SI 2005/1821 (C. 77))
- The Domestic Violence, Crime and Victims Act 2004 (Commencement No. 4) Order 2005 (SI 2005/2848 (C. 119))
- The Domestic Violence, Crime and Victims Act 2004 (Commencement No. 5) Order 2005 (SI 2005/3196 (C. 137))
- The Domestic Violence, Crime and Victims Act 2004 (Commencement No. 6) Order 2006 (SI 2006/2662 (C. 90))
- The Domestic Violence, Crime and Victims Act 2004 (Commencement No. 7 and Transitional Provision) Order 2006 (SI 2006/3423 (C. 131))
- The Domestic Violence, Crime and Victims Act 2004 (Commencement No. 8) Order 2007 (SI 2007/602 (C. 26))
- The Domestic Violence, Crime and Victims Act 2004 (Commencement No. 9 and Transitional Provisions) Order 2007 (SI 2007/1845 (C. 69))
- The Domestic Violence, Crime and Victims Act 2004 (Commencement No. 10) Order 2008 (SI 2008/3065 (C. 131))
- The Domestic Violence, Crime and Victims Act 2004 (Commencement No. 11) Order 2009 (SI 2009/2501 (C. 104))
- The Domestic Violence, Crime and Victims Act 2004 (Commencement No. 12) Order 2009 (SI 2009/2616 (C. 117))
- The Domestic Violence, Crime and Victims Act 2004 (Commencement No. 13) Order 2010 (SI 2010/129 (C. 16))
- The Domestic Violence, Crime and Victims Act 2004 (Commencement No. 14) Order 2011 (SI 2011/1008 (C. 41))

== See also ==
- Outline of domestic violence
