= Caravan Sites Act 1968 =

Act of the Parliament of the United Kingdom

Caravan Sites Act 1968 (Note: Section 17(1).)
- Act of Parliament
- Parliament of the United Kingdom
- Long title: An Act to restrict the eviction from caravan sites of occupiers of caravans and make other provision for the benefit of such occupiers; to secure the establishment of such sites by local authorities for the use of gipsies and other persons of nomadic habit, and control in certain areas the unauthorised occupation of land by such persons; to amend the definition of "caravan" in Part I of the Caravan Sites and Control of Development Act 1960; and for purposes connected with the matters aforesaid.
- Citation: 1968 c. 52
- Introduced by: Eric Lubbock (Commons)
- Territorial extent: England and Wales; Scotland (in part); (Note: Section 17(3), as substituted by section 8 of, and the schedule to, the Mobile Homes Act 1975. As enacted the act did not extend to Scotland; it now extends there only in part (part I and sections 13, 14(1), 16 and 17).)

Dates
- Royal assent: 26 July 1968
- Commencement: 26 August 1968 (except part II); 1 April 1970 (part II); (Note: Section 17(2). The Caravan Sites Act 1968 (Part II) (Commencement) Order 1970 (SI 1970/199).)
Other legislation
| Amends | Caravan Sites and Control of Development Act 1960 |
| Amended by | Mobile Homes Act 1975; Protection from Eviction Act 1977; Roads (Scotland) Act 1984; Planning (Consequential Provisions) Act 1990; Criminal Justice and Public Order Act 1994; Planning (Consequential Provisions) (Scotland) Act 1997; Civil Partnership Act 2004; Housing Act 2004; Housing (Scotland) Act 2006; Caravan Sites Act 1968 and Social Landlords (Permissible Additional Purposes) (England) Order 2006 (Definition of Caravan) (Amendment) (England) Order 2006; Caravan Sites Act 1968 (Amendment) (Wales) Order 2007; Mobile Homes (Wales) Act 2013; Mobile Homes Act 2013; Crime and Courts Act 2013; Caravan Sites Act 1968 (Amendment of Definition of Caravan) (Scotland) Order 2019; Judicial Review and Courts Act 2022 (Magistrates' Court Sentencing Powers) Regulations 2023; Town and Country Planning (Fees and Consequential Amendments) Regulations 2025 |

Status: Partially repealed

Text of statute as originally enacted

Text of the Caravan Sites Act 1968 as in force today (including any amendments) within the United Kingdom, from legislation.gov.uk.

The Caravan Sites Act 1968 (c. 52) is an act of the Parliament of the United Kingdom, which resulted in the provision of 400 halting sites in the UK where there had been no council-sites before. The act was passed after a series of protests against the Caravan Sites and Control of Development Act 1960 (8 & 9 Eliz. 2. c. 62), which allowed local authorities to close traditional stops used by travellers.

The private member's bill was proposed by Eric Lubbock of the Liberal Party.

== Provisions ==
Part I of the act (sections 1 to 5) protects residential occupiers of caravans on protected sites, which are sites that need a site licence under Part I of the Caravan Sites and Control of Development Act 1960 (8 & 9 Eliz. 2. c. 62), other than sites licensed for holiday use only. Section 2 of the act makes a notice to determine a residential contract of no effect unless it is given at least four weeks before it is to take effect. Section 3 of the act makes it an offence to evict an occupier unlawfully, to enforce a right to exclude an occupier without court proceedings after the contract has ended, or to harass an occupier or withdraw services in order to make the occupier leave. Section 4 of the act allows the county court to suspend enforcement of an eviction order for up to twelve months at a time, having regard to the conduct of the occupier and the owner.

Part II of the act (sections 6 to 12) dealt with gipsy encampments. Section 6 of the act required county councils, county boroughs and London boroughs to provide adequate accommodation for gipsies residing in or resorting to their area, limited to fifteen caravans in a county borough or London borough, and sections 7 and 8 of the act divided the work between county and district councils. Section 9 of the act let the Minister direct a local authority to provide sites. Section 10 of the act made it an offence for a gipsy to station a caravan for residence on a highway, on unoccupied land or on occupied land without consent, in an area designated by the Minister under section 12 of the act, and section 11 of the act let a magistrates' court authorise the local authority to remove the caravans and their occupiers.

Part III of the act (sections 13 to 17) treats twin-unit caravans as caravans for the purposes of Part I of the 1960 act, subject to maximum dimensions that the Minister can change by order. Section 14 of the act makes officers of a body corporate liable for its offences and lets local authorities bring proceedings, and section 15 of the act provides for financial provision.

== Subsequent developments ==
Part II of the act, together with the definition of "gipsies" in section 16, was repealed by section 80(1) of the Criminal Justice and Public Order Act 1994, which came into force on 3 November 1994.
