= Northern Ireland (Emergency Provisions) Act 1973 =

Act of the Parliament of the United Kingdom

Northern Ireland (Emergency Provisions) Act 1973 (Note: Section 31(1).)
- Act of Parliament
- Parliament of the United Kingdom
- Long title: An Act to make provision with respect to the following matters in Northern Ireland, that is to say, proceedings for and the punishment of certain offences, the detention of terrorists, the preservation of the peace, the maintenance of order and the detection of crime and to proscribe and make other provision in connection with certain organisations there, and for connected purposes.
- Citation: 1973 c. 53
- Introduced by: William Whitelaw
- Territorial extent: Northern Ireland (Note: Section 31(8).)

Dates
- Royal assent: 25 July 1973
- Commencement: 8 August 1973 (Note: Section 30.)

Other legislation
- Amends: Judgment of Death Act 1823; Piracy Act 1837; Offences against the Person Act 1861; Capital Punishment Amendment Act 1868; Criminal Law and Procedure (Ireland) Act 1887; Emergency Powers Act (Northern Ireland) 1926; Criminal Justice Act (Northern Ireland) 1945; Army Act 1955; Air Force Act 1955; Naval Discipline Act 1957; Summary Jurisdiction and Criminal Justice Act (Northern Ireland) 1958; Magistrates' Courts Act (Northern Ireland) 1964; Criminal Justice Act (Northern Ireland) 1966; Criminal Law Act (Northern Ireland) 1967; Children and Young Persons Act (Northern Ireland) 1968; Public Order (Amendment) Act (Northern Ireland) 1971; Firearms (Amendment) Act (Northern Ireland) 1971; Prosecution of Offences (Northern Ire land) Order 1972
- Repeals/revokes: Civil Authorities (Special Powers) Act (Northern Ireland) 1922; Civil Authorities (Special Powers) Act (Northern Ireland) 1933; Ministries Act (Northern Ireland) 1940; Civil Authorities (Special Powers) Act (Northern Ireland) 1943; Criminal Justice (Temporary Provisions) Acts (Northern Ireland) 1970; Criminal Justice (Temporary Provisions) (Amendment) Act (Northern Ireland) 1970; Detention of Terrorists (Northern Ireland) Order 1972
- Amended by: Northern Ireland (Emergency Provisions) (Amendment) Act 1975; Northern Ireland (Emergency Provisions) (Amendment) Act 1977; Northern Ireland (Emergency Provisions) Act 1978; Criminal Justice (Children) (Northern Ireland) Order 1998; Life Sentences (Northern Ireland) Order 2001; Northern Ireland Constitution Act 1973
- Relates to: Defence of the Realm Act 1914; Restoration of Order in Ireland Act 1920; Emergency Powers Act 1920; Emergency Powers (Defence) Act 1939; Murder (Abolition of Death Penalty) Act 1965; Civil Contingencies Act 2004

Status: Amended

Text of statute as originally enacted

Revised text of statute as amended

Text of the Northern Ireland (Emergency Provisions) Act 1973 as in force today (including any amendments) within the United Kingdom, from legislation.gov.uk.

The Northern Ireland (Emergency Provisions) Act 1973 (c. 53) is an act of the Parliament of the United Kingdom which abolished the death penalty for murder in Northern Ireland, and established the Diplock courts in which terrorist offences were tried by a judge without a jury. It has mostly been repealed, the anti-terrorism provisions having been superseded by subsequent legislation. The death penalty had not been used in Northern Ireland since 1961, when Robert McGladdery was hanged.

The act banned membership under penalty of law in the following organisations:

- Irish Republican Army
- Cumann na mBan
- Fianna Éireann
- Saor Éire
- Sinn Féin
- Ulster Volunteer Force

The subsequent Elected Authorities (Northern Ireland) Act 1989 would require oaths renouncing these organisations (except Sinn Féin).

== See also ==
- Prevention of Terrorism Acts
- Capital punishment in the United Kingdom
