= Criminal Law Act (Northern Ireland) 1967 =

Act of the Parliament of Northern Ireland

Criminal Law Act (Northern Ireland) 1967 (Note: Section 15.)
- Act of Parliament
- Parliament of Northern Ireland
- Long title: An Act to abolish the division of crimes into felonies and misdemeanours, to amend and simplify the law in respect of matters arising from or related to that division or the abolition of it, to make further provision with respect to criminal proceedings and offences; and for purposes connected with any of those matters.
- Citation: 1967 c. 18 (N.I.)
- Territorial extent: Northern Ireland

Dates
- Royal assent: 1 August 1967
- Commencement: 29 August 1967 (Note: Section 14(1).)
Other legislation
Amends	Act of Supremacy (Ireland) 1560
Repeals/revokes	Treason Act 1800
Amended by	Criminal Appeal (Northern Ireland) Act 1968; Northern Ireland (Emergency Provisions) Act 1973; Judicature (Northern Ireland) Act 1978; Statute Law Revision (Northern Ireland) Act 1980; Statute Law (Repeals) Act 1998
Relates to	Criminal Law Act 1967

Status: Amended

Revised text of statute as amended

The Criminal Law Act (Northern Ireland) 1967 (c. 18 (N.I.)) is an act of the Parliament of Northern Ireland.

== Provisions ==
The act makes similar provision to the Criminal Law Act 1967 for Northern Ireland.

The act created a general duty to report information they have to police if a relevant offence has been committed. An offence is relevant if the sentence could be five years.

The act abolished the distinction between felonies and misdemeanours.

== See also ==
- Criminal Law Act
