= Brighton Marina Act 1968 =

Government Act in the United Kingdom

- Act of Parliament
- Parliament of the United Kingdom
- Long title: An Act to authorise the Brighton Marina Company Limited to construct works; and for other purposes
- Citation: 1968 c. ii

Dates
- Royal assent: 10 April 1968

Status: Current legislation

Text of statute as originally enacted

The Brighton Marina Act 1968 (c. ii) is an act of the Parliament of the United Kingdom, which is still in force. The act authorised the Brighton Marina Company to construct a marina and other works on land reclaimed from the sea approximately 2 miles east of the centre of Brighton.

== Provisions of the act ==
The act is divided into seven parts:

- Part I – Preliminary
- Part II – Works
- Part III – Use of harbour and harbour charges
- Part IV – Miscellaneous
- Part V – Protective Provisions
- Part VI – General

== Part V – Protective provisions ==
Subsection s. 55(1) of part V states:

For the protection of the corporation the next following four sections of this Act shall unless otherwise agreed in writing between the Company and the corporation apply and have effect.

Subsection s. 59(1) of part V states:

The Company shall not construct or erect, to the south of the cliff face, any work, building or structure to a greater height than the height, at the time of such construction or erection, of that part of the cliff face which lies immediately to the north thereof.

=== Brighton Marina Outer Harbour development 2006 ===
In 2006 Brighton and Hove City Council received legal advice that the council would not be acting unlawfully under part V of the act if they gave permission for the construction of the Outer Harbour development at the marina.
