= Courts-Martial (Appeals) Act 1968 =

Act of the Parliament of the United Kingdom

Courts-Martial (Appeals) Act 1968 (Note: Section 61(1).)
- Act of Parliament
- Parliament of the United Kingdom
- Long title: An Act to consolidate the Courts-Martial (Appeals) Act 1951 and the enactments amending it, including so much of the Administration of Justice Act 1960 as provides an appeal from the Courts-Martial Appeal Court to the House of Lords.
- Citation: 1968 c. 20
- Territorial extent: United Kingdom

Dates
- Royal assent: 8 May 1968
- Commencement: 1 September 1968 (Note: Section 61(2). The Criminal Justice Act 1967 (Commencement No. 3) Order 1968 (SI 1968/325).)

Other legislation
- Amends: See § Repealed enactments
- Repeals/revokes: See § Repealed enactments
- Amended by: Administration of Justice Act 1970; Armed Forces Act 1971; Superannuation Act 1972; Bail Act 1976; Administration of Justice Act 1977; Senior Courts Act 1981; Mental Health Act 1983; Police and Criminal Evidence Act 1984; Mental Health (Scotland) Act 1984; Mental Health (Northern Ireland Consequential Amendments) Order 1986; Prisons (Scotland) Act 1989; Criminal Appeal Act 1995; Armed Forces Act 1996; Youth Justice and Criminal Evidence Act 1999; Armed Forces Act 2001; Courts Act 2003; Criminal Justice Act 2003; Domestic Violence, Crime and Victims Act 2004; Constitutional Reform Act 2005; Armed Forces Act 2006; Mental Health Act 2007; Criminal Justice and Immigration Act 2008; Coroners and Justice Act 2009; Court Martial (Prosecution Appeals) Order 2009; Armed Forces Act 2011; Legal Aid, Sentencing and Punishment of Offenders Act 2012; Armed Forces (Retrial for Serious Offences) Order 2013; Sentencing Act 2020; Public Service Pensions and Judicial Offices Act 2022
- Relates to: Criminal Appeal Act 1968; Criminal Appeal (Northern Ireland) Act 1968

Status: Amended

Text of statute as originally enacted

Revised text of statute as amended

Text of the Courts-Martial (Appeals) Act 1968 as in force today (including any amendments) within the United Kingdom, from legislation.gov.uk.

The Courts-Martial (Appeals) Act 1968 (c. 20) is an act of the Parliament of the United Kingdom that consolidated enactments relating to appeals from courts-martial in the United Kingdom.

== Provisions ==
=== Repealed enactments ===
Section 60 of the act repealed 10 enactments, listed in schedule 6 to the act.

Enactments repealed by section 60
Citation	Short title	Extent of repeal
14 & 15 Geo. 6. c. 46	Courts-Martial (Appeals) Act 1951	Part I (that is to say, sections 1 to 27).
3 & 4 Eliz. 2. c. 20	Revision of the Army and Air Force Acts (Transitional Provisions) Act 1955	In Schedule 2, paragraph 15(2) to (5).
5 & 6 Eliz. 2. c. 52	Geneva Conventions Act 1957	Section 4(3).
5 & 6 Eliz. 2. c. 53	Naval Discipline Act 1957	In Schedule 5, the entry relating to the Courts-Martial (Appeals) Act 1951.
8 & 9 Eliz. 2. c. 65	Administration of Justice Act 1960	Section 10; in section 20(2) the words from the beginning to "such appeals"; Schedule 1 and so much of Schedule 3 as amends the Courts-Martial (Appeals) Act 1951.
9 & 10 Eliz. 2. c. 52	Army and Air Force Act 1961	In Schedule 2, the entry relating to the Courts-Martial (Appeals) Act 1951.
1964 c. 43	Criminal Appeal Act 1964	Section 4; section 6(3) and, in section 6(5) the words "except so far as it relates to appeals from and retrials by courts-martial"; Schedule 1; and so much of Schedule 2 as amends the Courts-Martial (Appeals) Act 1951.
1964 c. 84	Criminal Procedure (Insanity) Act 1964	In section 7, the references to the Courts-Martial (Appeals) Act 1951 and Part III of Schedule 2 to the Act; and Part III of that Schedule.
1966 c. 31	Criminal Appeal Act 1966	Section 9(1); in section 12(2) the definition of "the 1951 Act"; section 12(4); in section 12(7) the words "appeals from, and"; and Part I of Schedule 1.
1967 c. 80	Criminal Justice Act 1967	In Schedule 4, paragraphs 16 to 19, 31, 32 and 40.

== Subsequent developments ==
The Armed Forces Act 2006 made extensive amendments to the act, including substituting the heading of Part I (renamed "The Court Martial Appeal Court") and the heading of Part II (renamed "Appeals from the Court Martial"), reflecting the establishment of the Court Martial as a permanent standing court. Section 61(1) was also amended to provide that the act may be cited as the Court Martial Appeals Act 1968.
