= Criminal Justice Act (Northern Ireland) 1966 =

Act of the Parliament of Northern Ireland

Criminal Justice Act (Northern Ireland) 1966 (Note: Section 23(1).)
- Act of Parliament
- Parliament of Northern Ireland
- Long title: An Act to make certain provision with respect to responsibility for offences and with respect to homicide and suicide; to provide for an appeal to the Court of Criminal Appeal against a verdict of not guilty on the ground of insanity and to empower that Court to order a new trial; and for purposes connected with the matters aforesaid or any of them.
- Citation: 1966 c. 20 (NI)
- Territorial extent: Northern Ireland

Dates
- Royal assent: 7 July 1966

Other legislation
- Amended by: Criminal Appeal (Northern Ireland) Act 1968; Northern Ireland (Emergency Provisions) Act 1973; Criminal Appeal (Northern Ireland) Act 1980

Status: Amended

Revised text of statute as amended

The Criminal Justice Act (Northern Ireland) 1966 (c. 20 (N.I.)) is an act of the Parliament of Northern Ireland.

== Provisions ==
The act contains certain provisions concerning homicide and suicide. The provisions concerning suicide are similar to the Suicide Act 1961.

The provisions under section 7 of the 1966 act concerning "provocation" were replaced by a definition of "loss of control" through the Coroners and Justice Act 2009.

== See also ==
- Criminal Justice Act
