= Criminal Appeal (Northern Ireland) Act 1968 =

Act of the Parliament of the United Kingdom

Criminal Appeal (Northern Ireland) Act 1968 (Note: Section 55(1).)
- Act of Parliament
- Parliament of the United Kingdom
- Long title: An Act to consolidate the enactments relating to the Court of Criminal Appeal in Northern Ireland, the jurisdiction of the Court and appeals therefrom to the House of Lords.
- Citation: 1968 c. 21
- Territorial extent: United Kingdom

Dates
- Royal assent: 8 May 1968
- Commencement: 1 September 1968 (Note: Section 55(2). The day appointed for the coming into operation of section 98 of the Criminal Justice Act 1967.)
- Repealed: 1 September 1980
Other legislation
Amends	See § Repealed enactments
Repeals/revokes	See § Repealed enactments
Amended by	Judicature (Northern Ireland) Act 1978
Repealed by	Criminal Appeal (Northern Ireland) Act 1980
Relates to	Criminal Appeal Act 1968; Courts-Martial (Appeals) Act 1968

Status: Repealed

Text of statute as originally enacted

The Criminal Appeal (Northern Ireland) Act 1968 (c. 21) was an act of the Parliament of the United Kingdom that consolidated the enactments relating to the Court of Criminal Appeal in Northern Ireland, the jurisdiction of the Court and appeals therefrom to the House of Lords.

== Provisions ==
=== Repealed enactments ===
Section 54 of the act repealed 11 enactments, listed in schedule 5 to the act.

Enactments repealed by section 54
Citation	Short title	Extent of repeal
Acts of the Parliament of the United Kingdom
20 & 21 Geo. 5. c. 45	Criminal Appeal (Northern Ireland) Act 1930	The whole act.
8 & 9 Eliz. 2. c. 65	Administration of Justice Act 1960	Section 1(1)(b).
8 & 9 Eliz. 2. c. 65	Administration of Justice Act 1960	Section 3(2).
8 & 9 Eliz. 2. c. 65	Administration of Justice Act 1960	Section 4(1).
8 & 9 Eliz. 2. c. 65	Administration of Justice Act 1960	Sections 7 and 8.
8 & 9 Eliz. 2. c. 65	Administration of Justice Act 1960	Section 9(1) and (4).
8 & 9 Eliz. 2. c. 65	Administration of Justice Act 1960	Section 18(1).
8 & 9 Eliz. 2. c. 65	Administration of Justice Act 1960	In Schedule 2, paragraph 4 of Part I and, in Part II, the modification of section 8.
8 & 9 Eliz. 2. c. 65	Administration of Justice Act 1960	In Schedule 3, the entry relating to the Criminal Appeal (Northern Ireland) Act 1930.
10 & 11 Eliz. 2. c. 30	Northern Ireland Act 1962	Section 6.
10 & 11 Eliz. 2. c. 30	Northern Ireland Act 1962	In section 29(1), the definition of "the Court of Criminal Appeal".
10 & 11 Eliz. 2. c. 30	Northern Ireland Act 1962	In Part I of Schedule 1, so much as amends the Criminal Appeal (Northern Ireland) Act 1930 and section 18 of the Administration of Justice Act 1960 and paragraph 4 of Part I of Schedule 2 to that Act.
1966 c. 31	Criminal Appeal Act 1966	Sections 5, 6, 7 and 11; and section 12(5).
1967 c. 80	Criminal Justice Act 1967	Section 98(6) and (7).
1967 c. 80	Criminal Justice Act 1967	In section 106(3)(d), the words "the Criminal Appeal (Northern Ireland) Act 1930", and the words from "sections 7" onwards.
1967 c. 80	Criminal Justice Act 1967	In Schedule 4, paragraphs 9 to 15, 25(a), 29, 36, 37, 39 and 41.
Acts of the Parliament of Northern Ireland
1950 c. 5 (N.I.)	Children and Young Persons Act (Northern Ireland) 1950	In section 57(5), paragraph (b).
1954 c. 33 (N.I.)	Interpretation Act (Northern Ireland) 1954	In section 42(1), in the definition of "Court of Criminal Appeal", the words "constituted under section one of the Criminal Appeal (Northern Ireland) Act 1930".
1961 c. 15 (N.I.)	Mental Health Act (Northern Ireland) 1961	Section 56(5).
1965 c. 8 (N.I.)	Legal Aid and Advice Act (Northern Ireland) 1965	In section 23, paragraph (b).
1966 c. 20 (N.I.)	Criminal Justice Act (Northern Ireland) 1966	In section 3(3), the words "and in the subsection substituted by that section for section 4(4) of the Criminal Appeal (Northern Ireland) Act 1930" and the words "and in the said substituted subsection".
1966 c. 20 (N.I.)	Criminal Justice Act (Northern Ireland) 1966	In Schedule 1, paragraph 27.
1967 c. 18 (N.I.)	Criminal Law Act (Northern Ireland) 1967	Part III, sections 15 to 20 and section 22.
1967 c. 18 (N.I.)	Criminal Law Act (Northern Ireland) 1967	Schedule 1.

== Subsequent developments ==
The whole act was repealed by section 51(2) of, and schedule 5 to, the Criminal Appeal (Northern Ireland) Act 1980, which came into force on 1 September 1980.
