= Caravan Sites and Control of Development Act 1960 =

Act of the Parliament of the United Kingdom

Caravan Sites and Control of Development Act 1960 (Note: Section 50(1).)
- Act of Parliament
- Parliament of the United Kingdom
- Long title: An Act to make further provision for the licensing and control of caravan sites, to authorise local authorities to provide and operate caravan sites, to amend the law relating to enforcement notices and certain other notices issued under Part III of the Town and Country Planning Act 1947, to amend sections twenty-six and one hundred and three of that Act and to explain other provisions in the said Part III; and for connected purposes.
- Citation: 8 & 9 Eliz. 2. c. 62
- Territorial extent: England and Wales; Scotland; (Note: Section 50(3).)

Dates
- Royal assent: 29 July 1960
- Commencement: 29 August 1960 (Note: Section 50(4).)
Other legislation
Amended by	Town and Country Planning Act 1962; London Government Act 1963; Law Reform (Miscellaneous Provisions) (Scotland) Act 1966; Courts Act 1971; Local Government Act 1972; Town and Country Planning (Scotland) Act 1972; Local Government (Scotland) Act 1973; Statute Law (Repeals) Act 1974; Criminal Procedure (Scotland) Act 1975; Local Government, Planning and Land Act 1980; Acquisition of Land Act 1981; Criminal Justice Act 1982; Local Government and Planning (Scotland) Act 1982; Local Government (Miscellaneous Provisions) Act 1982; Planning (Consequential Provisions) Act 1990; Statute Law (Repeals) Act 1993; Abolition of Feudal Tenure etc. (Scotland) Act 2000; Courts Act 2003; Fire and Rescue Services Act 2004; Constitutional Reform Act 2005; Mobile Homes Act 2013; Mobile Homes (Wales) Act 2013; Housing (Scotland) Act 2014

Status: Amended

Text of statute as originally enacted

Revised text of statute as amended

Text of the Caravan Sites and Control of Development Act 1960 as in force today (including any amendments) within the United Kingdom, from legislation.gov.uk.

The Caravan Sites and Control of Development Act 1960 (8 & 9 Eliz. 2. c. 62) is an act of the Parliament of the United Kingdom that regulated caravan sites.

== Provisions ==
The act was based on a 1959 report by Sir Arton Wilson on problems of people living in caravans, which found that the principal problem was the unclear and insufficient legislation on the matter, which gave neither local nor planning authorities powers to deal with caravan housing. As a result, the government brought in legislation regulating such housing, which was granted royal assent on 29 July 1960 and came into force exactly a month later. The act requires occupiers of land to gain a license before using that land as a caravan site, with the licensing authority being the local borough or district council. The license may be revoked, refused if the occupier has previously had a license revoked or contain such limitations as the council deem necessary. Violation of licensing terms bring a £100 fine for a first offence, and a £250 fine for any subsequent offences.

== Subsequent developments ==
Section 48 of, and schedule 4 to, the act were repealed by section 1 of, and part XI of the schedule to, the Statute Law (Repeals) Act 1974, which came into force on 27 June 1974.

== Bibliography ==
- Mann, Michael (1961). "Caravan Sites and Control of Development Act, 1960". Modern Law Review. 24 (1). Blackwell Publishing: 150–155. ISSN 0026-7961. JSTOR 1093046.
