= Criminal Appeal Act 1968 =

Act of the Parliament of the United Kingdom

Criminal Appeal Act 1968 (Note: Section 55(1).)
- Act of Parliament
- Parliament of the United Kingdom
- Long title: An Act to consolidate certain enactments relating to appeals in criminal cases to the criminal division of the Court of Appeal, and thence to the House of Lords.
- Citation: 1968 c. 19
- Territorial extent: England and Wales (Note: Section 55(3).)

Dates
- Royal assent: 8 May 1968
- Commencement: 1 September 1968 (Note: Section 55(2). The day appointed under section 106(5) of the Criminal Justice Act 1967 for the coming into force of section 98 of that act.)

Other legislation
- Amends: See § Repealed enactments
- Repeals/revokes: See § Repealed enactments
- Amended by: Courts Act 1971; Costs in Criminal Cases Act 1973; Statute Law (Repeals) Act 1973; Bail Act 1976; Prosecution of Offences Act 1979; Senior Courts Act 1981; Mental Health (Amendment) Act 1982; Mental Health Act 1983; Criminal Justice Act 1988; Criminal Justice and Public Order Act 1994; Criminal Appeal Act 1995; Crime and Disorder Act 1998; Access to Justice Act 1999; Youth Justice and Criminal Evidence Act 1999; Criminal Justice Act 2003; Constitutional Reform Act 2005; Mental Health Act 2007; Criminal Justice and Immigration Act 2008; Sentencing Act 2020
- Relates to: Courts-Martial (Appeals) Act 1968; Criminal Appeal (Northern Ireland) Act 1968

Status: Amended

Text of statute as originally enacted

Revised text of statute as amended

Text of the Criminal Appeal Act 1968 as in force today (including any amendments) within the United Kingdom, from legislation.gov.uk.

The Criminal Appeal Act 1968 (c. 19) is an act of the Parliament of the United Kingdom that consolidated certain enactments relating to appeals in criminal cases to the criminal division of the Court of Appeal (England and Wales) and thence to the House of Lords in England and Wales.

== Provisions ==
=== Repealed enactments ===
Section 54 of the act repealed 8 enactments, listed in schedule 7 to the act.

Citation	Short title	Extent of repeal
7 Edw. 7. c. 23	Criminal Appeal Act 1907	The whole act.
11 & 12 Geo. 6. c. 58	Criminal Justice Act 1948	Section 38(1).
15 & 16 Geo. 6 & 1 Eliz. 2. c. 48	Costs in Criminal Cases Act 1952	Section 3.
15 & 16 Geo. 6 & 1 Eliz. 2. c. 48	Costs in Criminal Cases Act 1952	In section 4(1), the words "or in the prosecution of his appeal to the Court of Criminal Appeal".
15 & 16 Geo. 6 & 1 Eliz. 2. c. 48	Costs in Criminal Cases Act 1952	In section 17(5), the words "subsection (2) of section three".
8 & 9 Eliz. 2. c. 65	Administration of Justice Act 1960	In section 1, subsection (1)(b).
8 & 9 Eliz. 2. c. 65	Administration of Justice Act 1960	Section 2(2).
8 & 9 Eliz. 2. c. 65	Administration of Justice Act 1960	Section 3(2).
8 & 9 Eliz. 2. c. 65	Administration of Justice Act 1960	Section 4(1).
8 & 9 Eliz. 2. c. 65	Administration of Justice Act 1960	Sections 7 and 8.
8 & 9 Eliz. 2. c. 65	Administration of Justice Act 1960	Section 9(4).
8 & 9 Eliz. 2. c. 65	Administration of Justice Act 1960	Schedule 3, so far as it amends the Criminal Appeal Act 1907, the Supreme Court of Judicature (Consolidation) Act 1925 and section 10 of the Costs in Criminal Cases Act 1952.
1964 c. 43	Criminal Appeal Act 1964	Sections 1 to 3 and 6(2).
1964 c. 43	Criminal Appeal Act 1964	Schedule 2, so far as it amends the Criminal Appeal Act 1907 and the Criminal Justice Administration Act 1962.
1964 c. 84	Criminal Procedure (Insanity) Act 1964	Sections 2 and 3.
1964 c. 84	Criminal Procedure (Insanity) Act 1964	In section 4, subsection (6) and in subsection (7) the words from the beginning to "restricting discharge; and".
1964 c. 84	Criminal Procedure (Insanity) Act 1964	In section 5, subsection (1)(b) and (d) and subsections (2) and (5).
1966 c. 31	Criminal Appeal Act 1966	In section 1, subsections (1) and (8).
1966 c. 31	Criminal Appeal Act 1966	Sections 4 to 8.
1966 c. 31	Criminal Appeal Act 1966	In section 12, the definitions in subsection (1) of "the 1907 Act" and "the 1952 Act", and subsection (3).
1966 c. 31	Criminal Appeal Act 1966	In Schedule 2, paragraphs 1 to 3 and 6 to 8.
1967 c. 80	Criminal Justice Act 1967	Section 32(5).
1967 c. 80	Criminal Justice Act 1967	Section 97.
1967 c. 80	Criminal Justice Act 1967	Section 98(1) to (5) and (7).
1967 c. 80	Criminal Justice Act 1967	In section 106(2)(f), the words "the Geneva Conventions Act 1957", and in section 106(3)(e), the words "the Geneva Conventions Act 1957 and".
1967 c. 80	Criminal Justice Act 1967	In Schedule 4, paragraphs 1 to 8, 20, 23, 24(a), 28, and 33 to 40.
1967 c. 80	Criminal Justice Act 1967	In Schedule 6, paragraphs 4, 22 and 27.

== Subsequent developments ==
The Criminal Appeal Act 1995 made significant amendments to the act, in particular inserting provisions establishing the Criminal Cases Review Commission, a body to review possible miscarriages of justice and refer cases back to the Court of Appeal.

The Constitutional Reform Act 2005 amended the act to replace references to the House of Lords with references to the Supreme Court of the United Kingdom, which assumed the House of Lords' judicial functions when it came into being in October 2009.
