= Compulsory Purchase (Vesting Declarations) Act 1981 =

Act of the Parliament of the United Kingdom

Compulsory Purchase (Vesting Declarations) Act 1981 (Note: Section 17(1).)
- Act of Parliament
- Parliament of the United Kingdom
- Long title: An Act to consolidate the provisions of the Town and Country Planning Act 1968 concerning general vesting declarations, and related enactments.
- Citation: 1981 c. 66
- Territorial extent: England and Wales (Note: Section 17(3).)

Dates
- Royal assent: 30 October 1981
- Commencement: 30 January 1982 (Note: Section 17(2).)

Other legislation
- Amends: See § Repealed enactments
- Repeals/revokes: See § Repealed enactments
- Amended by: Inheritance Tax Act 1984; Planning (Consequential Provisions) Act 1990; Transfer of Tribunal Functions (Lands Tribunal and Miscellaneous Amendments) Order 2009; Housing and Planning Act 2016; Levelling-up and Regeneration Act 2023; Planning and Infrastructure Act 2025
- Relates to: Acquisition of Land Act 1981

Status: Amended

Text of statute as originally enacted

Revised text of statute as amended

Text of the Compulsory Purchase (Vesting Declarations) Act 1981 as in force today (including any amendments) within the United Kingdom, from legislation.gov.uk.

The Compulsory Purchase (Vesting Declarations) Act 1981 (c. 66) is an act of the Parliament of the United Kingdom that consolidated the provisions of the Town and Country Planning Act 1968 concerning general vesting declarations, and related enactments, in England and Wales.

== Provisions ==
=== Repealed enactments ===
Section 16(3) of the act repealed 4 enactments, listed in schedule 5 to the act.

Enactments repealed by section 16(3)
Citation	Short title	Extent of repeal
1968 c. 72	Town and Country Planning Act 1968	Section 30.
1968 c. 72	Town and Country Planning Act 1968	In section 104, in subsection (1) the definitions of "Act of 1946", "prescribed" and "the principal Act", and subsection (3).
1968 c. 72	Town and Country Planning Act 1968	Schedule 3.
1968 c. 72	Town and Country Planning Act 1968	Schedule 3A.
1968 c. 72	Town and Country Planning Act 1968	In Schedule 10 paragraph 14.
1971 c. 18	Land Commission (Dissolution) Act 1971	In Schedule 2 paragraph 2 and Appendix A.
1973 c. 26	Land Compensation Act 1973	In section 58(1) the words "paragraph 10 of Schedule 3A to the Town and Country Planning Act 1968".
1980 c. 65	Local Government, Planning and Land Act 1980	In Schedule 27 paragraphs 1 to 8.

== Subsequent developments ==
The act has been amended on a number of occasions since its enactment. The Housing and Planning Act 2016 inserted section 5A, imposing a time limit of three years from the compulsory purchase order becoming operative for executing a general vesting declaration, and Schedule A1, establishing a counter-notice procedure enabling owners to require the acquiring authority to purchase the whole of a house, building or factory where only part is included in the declaration. The Levelling-up and Regeneration Act 2023 further amended the time-limit provisions in section 5A and inserted sections 8A and 8B, enabling an acquiring authority and the owner of an interest to agree in writing to postpone or advance the vesting date. The Planning and Infrastructure Act 2025 inserted sections 4A and 4B, providing an expedited vesting procedure for unoccupied or derelict land.

== See also ==
- English land law
- Compulsory purchase in England and Wales
