= Rent (Scotland) Act 1984 =

Act of the Parliament of the United Kingdom

Rent (Scotland) Act 1984 (Note: Section 118(1).)
- Act of Parliament
- Parliament of the United Kingdom
- Long title: An Act to consolidate in relation to Scotland certain enactments relating to rents and tenants' rights and connected matters.
- Citation: 1984 c. 58
- Territorial extent: Scotland (Note: Section 118(3).)

Dates
- Royal assent: 31 October 1984
- Commencement: 31 January 1985 (Note: Section 118(2).)

Other legislation
- Amends: See § Repealed enactments
- Repeals/revokes: See § Repealed enactments
- Amended by: Rent (Amendment) Act 1985; Housing (Consequential Provisions) Act 1985; Law Reform (Miscellaneous Provisions) (Scotland) Act 1985; Debtors (Scotland) Act 1987; Housing (Scotland) Act 1987; Housing (Scotland) Act 1988; Local Government and Housing Act 1989; Agricultural Holdings (Scotland) Act 1991; Statute Law (Repeals) Act 1993; Local Government Finance (Housing) (Consequential Amendments) (Scotland) Order 1993; Local Government etc. (Scotland) Act 1994; Deregulation and Contracting Out Act 1994; Scotland Act 1998 (Consequential Modifications) (No. 2) Order 1999; Housing (Scotland) Act 2001; Homelessness etc. (Scotland) Act 2003; Water Industry (Scotland) Act 2002 (Consequential Provisions) Order 2003; Civil Partnership Act 2004; Immigration, Asylum and Nationality Act 2006; Housing (Scotland) Act 2006; Bankruptcy and Diligence etc. (Scotland) Act 2007; Licensing (Scotland) Act 2005 (Consequential Provisions) Order 2009; Private Rented Housing (Scotland) Act 2011; Housing (Scotland) Act 2014; Private Housing (Tenancies) (Scotland) Act 2016; First-tier Tribunal for Scotland (Transfer of Functions of the Private Rented Housing Committees) Regulations 2016; Private Housing (Tenancies) (Scotland) Act 2016 (Commencement No. 3, Amendment, Saving Provision and Revocation) Regulations 2017; Crown Estate Transfer Scheme 2017; Land Reform (Scotland) Act 2016 (Supplementary, Consequential, Transitory and Saving Provisions) Regulations 2017; Immigration, Nationality and Asylum (EU Exit) Regulations 2019; Civil and Family Justice (EU Exit) (Scotland) (Amendment etc.) Regulations 2020; Coronavirus (Recovery and Reform) (Scotland) Act 2022; Renters' Rights Act 2025; Housing (Scotland) Act 2025

Status: Partially repealed

Text of statute as originally enacted

Revised text of statute as amended

Text of the Rent (Scotland) Act 1984 as in force today (including any amendments) within the United Kingdom, from legislation.gov.uk.

The Rent (Scotland) Act 1984 (c. 58) is an act of the Parliament of the United Kingdom that consolidated enactments related to rents and tenants' rights in Scotland.

== Provisions ==
=== Repealed enactments ===
Section 117(3) of the act repealed 15 enactments, listed in schedule 10 to the act.

Enactments repealed by section 117(3)
Citation	Short title	Extent of repeal
1965 c. 75	Rent Act 1965	The whole act.
1971 c. 28	Rent (Scotland) Act 1971	The whole act, except, in schedule 18, part II.
1971 c. 40	Fire Precautions Act 1971	In section 34, the words "Part III of" and the words from "after the Rent" to "effect". In the schedule, in part III, paragraphs 1, 3(1)(c), 3(2) and 3(3); and in part IV, in paragraph 3, the words from "or is the amount" to "64(4)".
1971 c. 58	Sheriff Courts (Scotland) Act 1971	In schedule 1, paragraph 4.
1972 c. 46	Housing (Financial Provisions) (Scotland) Act 1972	Section 36. Sections 39 to 43. Sections 45 to 50. Sections 60 to 63. Sections 66 and 67. Section 68(2). Section 77. In section 81(2), the words from "and the Rent" to the end. Schedule 7. In schedule 9, paragraphs 22 to 30, 31(2) and (3) and 32. In schedule 10, paragraph 4.
1972 c. 71	Criminal Justice Act 1972	Section 30.
1974 c. 44	Housing Act 1974	In schedule 13, paragraph 23(5) to (7).
1974 c. 45	Housing (Scotland) Act 1974	In schedule 3, paragraphs 34 to 40 and 43.
1974 c. 51	Rent Act 1974	The whole act.
1975 c. 28	Housing Rents and Subsidies (Scotland) Act 1975	Section 17(3). In schedule 3, paragraph 4.
1978 c. 14	Housing (Financial Provisions) (Scotland) Act 1978	Section 14.
1980 c. 52	Tenants' Rights, Etc. (Scotland) Act 1980	Sections 34 to 36. Section 37, except subsections (1) and (5). Section 38. Section 40. Section 41, except subsection (4). Sections 42 to 45. Section 46(3) and (4). Sections 47 and 48. Section 49(3). Sections 50 to 63. Section 64(2).
1980 c. 61	Tenants' Rights, Etc. (Scotland) Amendment Act 1980	Section 2(b), (c) and (d).
1980 c. 65	Local Government, Planning and Land Act 1980	Section 155(2).
1982 c. 48	Criminal Justice Act 1982	In schedule 15, paragraph 14.

== Subsequent developments ==
The Housing (Scotland) Act 1988 significantly amended the act by introducing the assured tenancy system in Scotland for tenancies created on or after 2 January 1989. The 1988 act inserted new sections (including section 3A and section 23A) and new schedules (schedules 1A and 1B) into the 1984 act, and repealed the proviso to section 34(1) and paragraph 5 of schedule 7, by section 72(3) of, and schedule 10 to, the Housing (Scotland) Act 1988. The act continues to govern protected and statutory tenancies created before 2 January 1989. Further amendments were made by the Private Rented Housing (Scotland) Act 2011, which repealed words in section 82(1) and section 82(2) by section 35 of that act, and by the Housing (Scotland) Act 2014, which repealed a word in schedule 2, part I, case 7 by schedule 1 to that act.
