= Planning (Consequential Provisions) Act 1990 =

Act of the Parliament of the United Kingdom

Planning (Consequential Provisions) Act 1990 (Note: Section 7(1).)
- Act of Parliament
- Parliament of the United Kingdom
- Long title: An Act to make provision for repeals, consequential amendments, transitional and transitory matters and savings in connection with the consolidation of enactments in the Town and Country Planning Act 1990, the Planning (Listed Buildings and Conservation Areas) Act 1990 and the Planning (Hazardous Substances) Act 1990.
- Citation: 1990 c. 11
- Territorial extent: England and Wales (Note: Section 7(3)–(4).)

Dates
- Royal assent: 24 May 1990
- Commencement: 24 August 1990 (Note: Section 7(2).)

Other legislation
- Amends: Gas Act 1965; Refuse Disposal (Amenity) Act 1978; Zoo Licensing Act 1981; Compulsory Purchase (Vesting Declarations) Act 1981; Channel Tunnel Act 1987; See § Repealed enactments
- Repeals/revokes: See § Repealed enactments
- Amended by: Town and Country Planning Act 1990; Planning (Listed Buildings and Conservation Areas) Act 1990; Planning and Compensation Act 1991; Water Consolidation (Consequential Provisions) Act 1991; Radioactive Substances Act 1993; Leasehold Reform, Housing and Urban Development Act 1993; Education Act 1993; Local Government (Wales) Act 1994; Coal Industry Act 1994; Value Added Tax Act 1994; Goods Vehicles (Licensing of Operators) Act 1995; Environment Act 1995; Planning (Consequential Provisions) (Scotland) Act 1997; Government of Wales Act 1998; Statute Law (Repeals) Act 1998; Postal Services Act 2000 (Consequential Modifications No. 1) Order 2001; Communications Act 2003; Courts Act 2003; Planning and Compulsory Purchase Act 2004; Constitutional Reform Act 2005; National Health Service (Consequential Provisions) Act 2006; Statute Law (Repeals) Act 2008; Regulatory Reform (Scotland) Act 2014
- Relates to: Town and Country Planning Act 1990; Planning (Listed Buildings and Conservation Areas) Act 1990; Planning (Hazardous Substances) Act 1990

Status: Amended

Text of statute as originally enacted

Revised text of statute as amended

Text of the Planning (Consequential Provisions) Act 1990 as in force today (including any amendments) within the United Kingdom, from legislation.gov.uk.

The Planning (Consequential Provisions) Act 1990 (c. 11) is an act of the Parliament of the United Kingdom to make provision for repeals, consequential amendments, transitional and transitory matters and savings in connection with the consolidation of enactments in the Town and Country Planning Act 1990, the Planning (Listed Buildings and Conservation Areas) Act 1990 and the Planning (Hazardous substances) Act 1990 (including provisions to give effect to recommendations of the Law Commission).

== Provisions ==
=== Repealed enactments ===
Section 3 of the act repealed 62 enactments, listed in parts I, II and III of the first schedule to the act; the repeals in part II extended to England and Wales only and those in part III to Scotland only.

Part I - General
Citation	Short title	Extent of repeal
10 & 11 Geo. 6. c. 51	Town and Country Planning Act 1947	The whole act.
10 & 11 Eliz. 2. c. 36	Local Authorities (Historic Buildings) Act 1962	The whole act.
10 & 11 Eliz. 2. c. 38	Town and Country Planning Act 1962	The whole act.
1963 c. 33	London Government Act 1963	In section 85, in subsection (3) the words from "or by" to "1971" and from "(or as" to "paragraph 6)" and in subsection (4) the words from "or of" to "1971".
1967 c. 69	Civic Amenities Act 1967	In section 5, paragraph (a) and in section 30(1), the definition of "the Planning Act".
1968 c. 72	Town and Country Planning Act 1968	The whole act.
1969 c. 22	Redundant Churches and Other Religious Buildings Act 1969	Section 2.
1969 c. 48	Post Office Act 1969	In Schedule 4, paragraph 89 and in paragraph 93, sub-paragraphs (1)(xxxiii) and (4)(j).
1971 c. 78	Town and Country Planning Act 1971	The whole act.
1972 c. 5	Local Employment Act 1972	In Schedule 3, the entry relating to the Town and Country Planning Act 1971.
1972 c. 70	Local Government Act 1972	In section 182, subsections (1) and (2), in subsection (3) paragraphs (a) and (c) and subsections (4) to (6). Section 183. In Schedule 16, paragraphs 4 to 54, 58 and 59.
1973 c. 26	Land Compensation Act 1973	In section 53(5) the words from "sections 180" to "or". Sections 68 to 82.
1973 c. 37	Water Act 1973	In Schedule 8, paragraph 94.
1974 c. 7	Local Government Act 1974	In Schedule 6, paragraph 25.
1974 c. 32	Town and Country Amenities Act 1974	Section 1(1). Section 4(1). In section 6, the words from "section 116" to "and in" and the words from "Schedule 8" to "or". Section 7(1). Section 8. Section 10. Section 13(1)(a).
1975 c. 76	Local Land Charges Act 1975	In Schedule 1, the entry relating to the Town and Country Planning Act 1971.
1977 c. 29	Town and Country Planning (Amendment) Act 1977	The whole act.
1979 c. 46	Ancient Monuments and Archaeological Areas Act 1979	In Schedule 4, paragraph 11.
1980 c. 65	Local Government, Planning and Land Act 1980	Section 86(1) to (6). Sections 89 and 90. Section 91(1). Section 119. In section 122, in subsection (1) the words "section 113 of the Town and Country Planning Act 1971" and "and 113", and in subsections (2), (3), (6) and (8) the word "113". In section 147, in subsection (1) the words from the beginning to "and", in subsection (3) the words from "sections 192" to "Act and" and in subsection (5) the words from the beginning to "Scotland". In section 149, in subsection (1) the words from "in place" to "planning authority", in subsection (3)(a) the words from "and in place" to "them" and subsection (5). Section 150. Schedule 14. In Schedule 15, paragraphs 2 to 15, 17 to 20, 22, 23 and 25 to 28. In Schedule 23, paragraphs 8 to 11. In Schedule 32, paragraph 5(7), in paragraph 15(2)(b), sub-paragraph (i), in paragraph 17(7) the words "the 1971 Act or", in the first place where they occur, and "Part III of the 1971 Act or", paragraphs 18, 20(1), 22(2)(a), 23 and 26(1A)(a). In Schedule 33, paragraph 12.
1980 c. 66	Highways Act 1980	In Schedule 24, paragraphs 20 and 22, and in paragraph 23, sub-paragraphs (d) to (h).
1981 c. 36	Town and Country Planning (Minerals) Act 1981	Sections 1 to 18. In section 34, the words from the beginning to "Act, and" and the words "in each case". Schedule 1.
1981 c. 38	British Telecommunications Act 1981	In Schedule 3, paragraph 10(2)(c).
1981 c. 41	Local Government and Planning (Amendment) Act 1981	The whole act.
1981 c. 43	Disabled Persons Act 1981	Section 3.
1981 c. 54	Supreme Court Act 1981	In Schedule 5, the entry relating to the Town and Country Planning Act 1971.
1981 c. 64	New Towns Act 1981	In Schedule 12, paragraph 11.
1981 c. 67	Acquisition of Land Act 1981	In Schedule 4, in the Table in paragraph 1, the entry relating to the Town and Country Planning Act 1971 and paragraph 21.
1981 c. 69	Wildlife and Countryside Act 1981	In Schedule 16, paragraphs 1 to 4.
1982 c. 16	Civil Aviation Act 1982	In Schedule 2, in paragraphs 4 and 5 the entries relating to the Town and Country Planning Act 1971 and paragraph 6. In Schedule 10, in paragraphs 4(c) and 8(c), the words from "either" to "or".
1982 c. 21	Planning Inquiries (Attendance of Public) Act 1982	The whole act.
1982 c. 30	Local Government (Miscellaneous Provisions) Act 1982	Sections 35 and 36. In Schedule 5, paragraphs 2 and 3. In Schedule 6, paragraph 7.
1982 c. 52	Industrial Development Act 1982	In Part II of Schedule 2, paragraph 7(2).
1983 c. 47	National Heritage Act 1983	In Schedule 4, paragraphs 15 to 17 and 19 to 21, 22(1) to (5) and (7), 23 and 24.
1984 c. 12	Telecommunications Act 1984	In Schedule 4, paragraph 53.
1984 c. 32	London Regional Transport Act 1984	In Schedule 6, paragraph 9.
1985 c. 19	Town and Country Planning (Compensation) Act 1985	Section 1.
1985 c. 51	Local Government Act 1985	In section 3, subsections (1), (3) and (4). Sections 4 and 5. Schedule 1. In Schedule 2, paragraph 1. In Schedule 3, paragraphs 2 and 3(1) and in paragraph 4 the words "54(2) and". In Schedule 4, paragraph 50. In Schedule 14, paragraph 48.
1985 c. 52	Town and Country Planning (Amendment) Act 1985	Section 1.
1985 c. 68	Housing Act 1985	In section 256(4), paragraph (b).
1985 c. 71	Housing (Consequential Provisions) Act 1985	In Schedule 2, paragraphs 22 and 24(8).
1986 c. 31	Airports Act 1986	In Schedule 2, in paragraph 1(1) and (2), the words "the Town and Country Planning Act 1971". In Schedule 4, paragraph 1.
1986 c. 44	Gas Act 1986	In Schedule 7, in paragraph 2, sub-paragraph (1)(xxiv) and (xxvi) and in (xxvii) the words "and 71" and sub-paragraphs (2)(c) and (9)(e) and paragraph 12.
1986 c. 63	Housing and Planning Act 1986	Section 25. Sections 30 to 34. Section 41. Sections 45 and 46. In section 58(1), the words from "in Part II" to "Schedule 6" and the words from "in Part IV" to "Schedule 7". In Schedule 6, Parts I and II. In Schedule 7, Part I. In Schedule 9, paragraphs 1 to 5, 6(1) and 7 to 12. Schedule 10. In Schedule 11, paragraphs 1 to 24, 26 and 27.
1987 c. 3	Coal Industry Act 1987	In Schedule 1, paragraph 19.
1988 c. 4	Norfolk and Suffolk Broads Act 1988	In Schedule 3, paragraphs 4, 7 to 28, 32 and 48.
1988 c. 40	Education Reform Act 1988	In Schedule 12, paragraphs 40 and 70.
1988 c. 50	Housing Act 1988	In section 67, in subsection (1) the words from "in place" onwards and in subsection (3) the words from "and in place" to "them", and subsections (5) and (6). In Schedule 17, paragraph 18.
1989 c. 15	Water Act 1989	In Schedule 25, in paragraph 1, in sub-paragraph (2), paragraphs (xvi) and (xvii) and in paragraph (xviii) the words "and 71", and sub-paragraphs (10)(iv) and (11)(ii), and paragraph 42.
1989 c. 29	Electricity Act 1989	In Schedule 16, in paragraph 1, in sub-paragraph (1), paragraphs (xxii) and (xxiv) and in paragraph (xxv) the words "and 71", paragraphs 2(2)(c), (4)(c) and (5)(b) and 3(1)(d).
1989 c. 42	Local Government and Housing Act 1989	In Schedule 11, paragraphs 19 and 20.

Part II - England and Wales only
Citation	Short title	Extent of repeal
9 & 10 Geo. 6. c. 35	Building Restrictions (War-Time Contraventions) Act 1946	The whole act.
14 & 15 Geo. 6. c. 60	Mineral Workings Act 1951	Section 32. Section 40(6).
1969 c. 48	Post Office Act 1969	In Schedule 9, paragraph 27(8).
1972 c. 42	Town and Country Planning (Amendment) Act 1972	The whole act.
1980 c. 65	Local Government, Planning and Land Act 1980	Section 87.
1984 c. 10	Town and Country Planning Act 1984	The whole act.
1989 c. 29	Electricity Act 1989	In Schedule 8, paragraph 7.

Part III - Scotland only
Citation	Short title	Extent of repeal
14 & 15 Geo. 6. c. 60	Mineral Workings Act 1951	In section 40(6), the words "section forty-nine of the principal Act or" and "as the case may be".
1972 c. 42	Town and Country Planning (Amendment) Act 1972	In section 10, in subsection (1), the words from "Subject" to "this section" and "section 277" to "1971 or", subsection (1AA), in subsection (2) the words from "or" to "Commission", subsections (3A) and (3B), in subsection (4) the words from "the appropriate" to "Monmouthshire)" and the words from "or the" to "Wales". In section 10A, in subsection (1) the words from "or" to "Commission", in subsections (3) and (5) the words "or (as the case may be) the Commission" and "or (as the case may be) they think", in subsection (8) the words "or (as the case may be) the Commission" and subsection (9).
1980 c. 65	Local Government, Planning and Land Act 1980	In section 87, in subsection (1) the words "a local planning authority in England or Wales or", in subsection (2) paragraph (a) and in subsection (8) paragraph (a).
1984 c. 10	Town and Country Planning Act 1984	In section 1, in subsection (1)(b) the words from "section 53" to "or", in subsection (5)(b) the words from "a local" to "Scotland" and in subsection (6) the words from "section 277A" to "1971 or". In section 2, in subsection (1) the words from the beginning to "Scotland" and in subsection (4) the words from "section 60" to "1971 or". In section 3, in subsection (2), the words "a local planning authority or, in Scotland" and subsection (8). In section 4, in subsection (1) the words "a licence in writing or, in Scotland" and the words from "section 266(1)(b)" to "be" and subsections (2) and (3). In section 5, in subsection (1) the words from the beginning to "Scotland", in subsection (2) the words "the Act of 1971 or, as the case may be", in subsection (3) the words "local planning authority or" and subsection (4). In section 6, in subsection (1), the definition of "the Act of 1971" and in the definition of "the appropriate authority" the words from "section 266(7)" to "Scotland" and subsections (2) and (3). Section 7(2)(b).
1989 c. 29	Electricity Act 1989	In Schedule 8, in paragraph 7(4), in the definition of "the Planning Act" the words from "the Town and Country Planning Act 1971" to "Wales and" and in the definition of "the relevant section" the words from "section 35" to "1971 and".
