= Airports Act 1986 =

Act of the Parliament of the United Kingdom

Airports Act 1986 (Note: Section 85(1).)
- Act of Parliament
- Parliament of the United Kingdom
- Long title: An Act to provide for the dissolution of the British Airports Authority and the vesting of its property, rights and liabilities in a company nominated by the Secretary of State; to provide for the reorganisation of other airport undertakings in the public sector; to provide for the regulation of the use of airports and for the imposition of economic controls at certain airports; to make other amendments of the law relating to airports; to make provision with respect to the control of capital expenditure by local authority airport undertakings; and for connected purposes
- Citation: 1986 c. 31
- Territorial extent: England and Wales; Scotland; Northern Ireland (in part); (Note: Section 85(7)–(8).)

Dates
- Royal assent: 8 July 1986
- Commencement: 8 July 1986 (various) (Note: Section 85(2).); 31 July 1986 (various) (Note: Section 85(5). The Airports Act 1986 (Commencement No. 1 and Appointed Day) Order 1986 (SI 1986/1228).); 1 August 1986 (various) (Note: Sections 85(3) and (5). The Airports Act 1986 (Commencement No. 1 and Appointed Day) Order 1986 (SI 1986/1228).); 8 September 1986 (various) (Note: Section 85(4).); 1 October 1986 (various) (Note: Section 85(5). The Airports Act 1986 (Commencement No. 2) Order 1986 (SI 1986/1487).); 1 April 1987 (rest of act)
Other legislation
Amends	Restrictive Trade Practices Act 1976; See § Repealed enactments
Repeals/revokes	See § Repealed enactments
Amended by	List: Financial Services Act 1986; Housing (Scotland) Act 1987; Consumer Protection Act 1987; Income and Corporation Taxes Act 1988; Finance Act 1988; Control of Misleading Advertisements Regulations 1988; Water Act 1989; Electricity Act 1989; Local Government and Housing Act 1989; Planning (Consequential Provisions) Act 1990; Planning and Compensation Act 1991; Water Consolidation (Consequential Provisions) Act 1991; Local Government and Housing Act 1989; Taxation of Chargeable Gains Act 1992; Electricity (Northern Ireland) Order 1992; Local Government (Wales) Act 1994; Sunday Trading Act 1994; Local Government etc. (Scotland) Act 1994; Finance Act 1996; Local Government (Transitional and Consequential Provisions and Revocations) (Scotland) Order 1996; Gas (Northern Ireland) Order 1996; Planning (Consequential Provisions) (Scotland) Act 1997; Government of Wales Act 1998; Competition Act 1998 (Competition Commission) Transitional, Consequential and Supplemental Provisions Order 1999; Transport Act 2000; Competition Act 1998 (Transitional, Consequential and Supplemental Provisions) Order 2000; Transport Act 2000 (Consequential Amendments) Order 2001; Local Authorities (Executive and Alternative Arrangements) (Modification of Enactments and Other Provisions) (England) Order 2001; Enterprise Act 2002; Transfer of Functions (Transport, Local Government and the Regions) Order 2002; Communications Act 2003; Water Act 2003; Stamp Duty Land Tax (Consequential Amendment of Enactments) Regulations 2003; Statute Law (Repeals) Act 2004; Civil Partnership Act 2004; Housing Act 2004; Public Audit (Wales) Act 2004; Water Industry (Scotland) Act 2002 (Consequential Modifications) Order 2004; Railways Act 2005; Civil Aviation Act 2006; Water and Sewerage Services (Northern Ireland) Order 2006; EC Competition Law (Articles 84 and 85) Enforcement (Revocation) Regulations 2007; Local Transport Act 2008; Companies Act 2006 (Consequential Amendments etc) Order 2008; Consumer Protection from Unfair Trading Regulations 2008; Corporation Tax Act 2009; Airport Charges Regulations 2011; Protection of Freedoms Act 2012; Civil Aviation Act 2012; Civil Aviation Act 2012 (Regulation of Operators of Dominant Airports) (Consequential Amendments) Regulations 2013; Local Audit and Accountability Act 2014; Enterprise and Regulatory Reform Act 2013 (Competition) (Consequential, Transitional and Saving Provisions) Order 2014; Office of Rail Regulation (Change of Name) Regulations 2015; Digital Economy Act 2017; Communications Act 2003 and the Digital Economy Act 2017 (Consequential Amendments to Primary Legislation) Regulations 2017; Water Act 2014 (Consequential Amendments etc.) Order 2017; Space Industry Act 2018; Civil Aviation (Amendment etc.) (EU Exit) Regulations 2019; Retained EU Law (Revocation and Reform) Act 2023 (Consequential Amendment) Regulations 2023; Digital Markets, Competition and Consumers Act 2024; Town and Country Planning (Fees and Consequential Amendments) Regulations 2025; Digital Markets, Competition and Consumers Act 2024 (Consequential Amendments) Regulations 2025
Relates to	Outer Space Act 1986

Status: Amended

History of passage through Parliament

Text of statute as originally enacted

Text of the Airports Act 1986 as in force today (including any amendments) within the United Kingdom, from legislation.gov.uk.

The Airports Act 1986 (c. 31) is an act of the Parliament of the United Kingdom. The act reformed civil aviation in Great Britain and privatised the British Airports Authority from a public department into BAA as a private company. It also granted additional regulatory powers to the Civil Aviation Authority (CAA).

== Provisions ==
BAA's logo

The British Airports Authority was established in 1965 by the Airports Authority Act 1965 to take management of the UK's larger airports into public ownership under a government authority. The Airports Act 1986 transferred the powers relating to running government owned airports from the British Airports Authority from the public sector to the private sector as part of a Conservative Party government policy of privatisation. BAA plc. was created as a result of the act to take over the authority's responsibilities. The act also granted statutory authority to the CAA to continue to regulate civil aviation in the United Kingdom as well as BAA. At the time of passage, BAA became responsible for London Heathrow Airport, London Gatwick Airport, London Stansted Airport, Glasgow Prestwick Airport, Glasgow International Airport, Edinburgh Airport and Aberdeen Airport. The act only applied to Great Britain and does not apply to Northern Ireland.

The act also included a number of miscellaneous provisions that were eventually mirrored in airport byelaws. This had the effect of making breaches of airport byelaws punishable under criminal law. An example of this was in 2016 where two people were arrested and charged for being "drunk or under the influence of drugs or other intoxicating substances" in "a restricted area of the airport" contrary to Sections 63 and 63.1 of the Airports Act.

== Repealed enactments ==
Section 83(5) of the act repealed 29 enactments, listed in parts I and II of schedule 6 to the act.

Part I – Repeals coming into force on the appointed day
Citation	Short title	Extent of repeal
1966 c. 34	Industrial Development Act 1966	In Schedule 2, the entry relating to the British Airports Authority.
1971 c. 78	Town and Country Planning Act 1971	In section 224(1)(c), the words "the British Airports Authority or ".
1972 c. 52	Town and Country Planning (Scotland) Act 1972	In section 213(1)(c), the words "the British Airports Authority or ".
1975 c. 24	House of Commons Disqualification Act 1975	In Part II of Schedule 1, the entry relating to the British Airports Authority.
1975 c. 78	Airports Authority Act 1975	The whole act.
1976 c. 57	Local Government (Miscellaneous Provisions) Act 1976	In section 15(3), the words "the British Airports Authority,".
1976 c. 70	Land Drainage Act 1976	In section 112(2), the words "the British Airports Authority,".
1976 c. 75	Development of Rural Wales Act 1976	In section 34(1), in the definition of "statutory undertakers", the words "the British Airports Authority,".
1978 c. 3	Refuse Disposal (Amenity) Act 1978	Section 12(1). Schedule 1.
1978 c. 8	Civil Aviation Act 1978	Section 8. In Schedule 1, paragraph 7.
1979 c. 46	Ancient Monuments and Archaeological Areas Act 1979	In section 61(2)(b), the words "the British Airports Authority,".
1980 c. 60	Civil Aviation Act 1980	Sections 24 and 25.
1980 c. 65	Local Government, Planning and Land Act 1980	In section 108(1)(b), the words "the British Airports Authority,". In section 120(3), in the definition of "statutory undertakers", the words "the British Airports Authority,". In section 170(1)(b), the words "the British Airports Authority,". In Schedule 16, paragraph 10.
1981 c. 64	New Towns Act 1981	In section 78(1)(c), the words "the British Airports Authority or". In section 79(1)(b), the words "or the British Airports". In Schedule 12, paragraph 19.
1981 c. 67	Acquisition of Land Act 1981	In section 8, in subsection (1)(b), the words "the British Airports Authority or", and subsection (2). In section 32(8), the words from "section 17(1)" to the end. In Schedule 4, paragraph 25.
1982 c. 1	Civil Aviation (Amendment) Act 1982	Section 1.
1982 c. 16	Civil Aviation Act 1982	Section 34(2). In section 35(1), the words "is managed by a person other than the BAA and". In section 88(10), the words ", the BAA". In section 105(1), the definition of the BAA. In Schedule 15, paragraph 17.
1982 c. 36	Aviation Security Act 1982	Section 27(7). Section 29(2)(b). Section 30(3)(b). In section 38(1), in the definition of "manager", the words "the British Airports Authority,".
1982 c. 48	Criminal Justice Act 1982	Section 44. In section 81(3), the words "section 44".
1983 c. 44	National Audit Act 1983	In Part I of Schedule 4, the entry relating to the British Airports Authority.
1984 c. 12	Telecommunications Act 1984	In Schedule 4, paragraph 64.
1984 c. 22	Public Health (Control of Disease) Act 1984	In section 14(1), the words "or the British Airports Authority".
1984 c. 27	Road Traffic Regulation Act 1984	In section 43(1), the words "and no such regulations" onwards. In Schedule 13, paragraph 33.
1984 c. 55	Building Act 1984	In section 4(1)(b) the words ", the British Airports Authority", in sub-paragraph (i) the words "or in the case of the British Airports Authority a house or a hotel,", and in sub-paragraph (ii) the words "the British Airports Authority or" and "in question". In section 59(4), the words ", the British Airports Authority", in paragraph (a) the words "or in the case of the British Airports Authority a house or a hotel,", and in paragraph (b) the words "the British Airports Authority or" and "in question".
1985 c. 71	Housing (Consequential Provisions) Act 1985	In Schedule 2, paragraph 29.

Part II – Repeals coming into force on a date appointed under section 85(5)
Citation	Short title	Extent of repeal
1973 c. 41	Fair Trading Act 1973	In Part II of Schedule 7, paragraph 13.
1980 c. 65	Local Government, Planning and Land Act 1980	Section 72(4)(iii).
1982 c. 16	Civil Aviation Act 1982	Section 27. Section 29. Sections 32 and 33. Section 37. In section 38(2), the words "Without prejudice to section 60(3)(f)),". Section 40. Section 58. Section 60(3)(o). Section 61(6). Section 99(5)(a). Schedule 5. In Part II of Schedule 13, the entries relating to sections 32(5), 33(1), 37, 40(2) and 61(6) of the 1982 Act. In Schedule 14, paragraph 5(1).
1982 c. 48	Criminal Justice Act 1982	Section 45. In section 81(5), the words "section 45".
