= Minerals planning guidance notes =

Minerals Planning Guidance Notes (MPGs) were statements of the British government’s policy on minerals and planning issues and provide advice and guidance to local authorities and the minerals industry on policies and the operation of the planning system with regard to minerals.

Under the provisions of the Planning and Compulsory Purchase Act 2004, they were gradually replaced by Mineral Policy Statements (MPSs). Most MPS's and MPG's have now been superseded by the National Planning Policy Framework (NPPF) which replaced MPS1, MPS2, MPG2, MPG3, MPG5, MPG7, MPG10, MPG13, MPG15.

The guidance was required to be considered when writing development plans.

MPG3 provided guidance on development control decisions.

Mineral planning authorities must take their contents into account in preparing their development plans. The guidance may also be material to decisions on individual planning applications and appeals.

- Minerals Planning Guidance 1: General considerations Published June 1996.
- Minerals Planning Guidance 2: Applications, permissions and conditions Published July 1998.
- Minerals Planning Guidance 3: Coal mining and colliery spoil disposal Published March 1999.
- Minerals Planning Guidance 4: Main document Revocation, modification, discontinuance, prohibition and suspension orders. Published August 1997.
- Minerals Planning Guidance 5: Stability in surface mineral workings and tips Published January 2000.
- Minerals Planning Guidance 6: Guidelines for aggregates provision in England Published April 1994.
- Minerals Planning Guidance 7: Reclamation of mineral workings Published November 1996.
- Minerals Planning Guidance 8: Main document Interim development order permissions (IDOS): statutory provisions and procedures. Published September 1991.
- Minerals Planning Guidance 9: Main document Planning and Compensation Act 1991: interim development order permissions (IDOS): conditions. Published March 1992.
- Minerals Planning Guidance 10: Provision of raw material for the cement industry Published 1991.
- Minerals Planning Guidance 11: Control of noise at surface mineral workings Published April 1993.
- Minerals Planning Guidance 13: Guidelines for peat provision in England Published July 1995.
- Minerals Planning Guidance 14: Environment Act 1995: review of mineral planning permissions Published September 1995.
- Minerals Planning Guidance 15: Provision of silica sand in England Published September 1996.

== See also ==
- Town and country planning in the United Kingdom
- Town and Country Planning Act 1990
- Planning and Compulsory Purchase Act 2004
- National Planning Policy Framework
