= Highways Act 1980 =

Act of the Parliament of the United Kingdom

Highways Act 1980 (Note: Section 345(1).)
- Act of Parliament
- Parliament of the United Kingdom
- Long title: An Act to consolidate the Highways Acts 1959 to 1971 and related enactments, with amendments to give effect to recommendations of the Law Commission.
- Citation: 1980 c. 66
- Territorial extent: England and Wales; United Kingdom (paragraph 18(c) of schedule 24 only); (Note: Section 345(3).)

Dates
- Royal assent: 13 November 1980
- Commencement: 1 January 1981 (Note: Section 345(2).)

Other legislation
- Amends: Military Lands Act 1892; Special Roads Act 1949; Public Health Act 1961; New Forest Act 1964; Refuse Disposal (Amenity) Act 1978; See § Repealed enactments
- Repeals/revokes: See § Repealed enactments
- Amended by: New Towns Act 1981; Acquisition of Land Act 1981; Litter Act 1983; Road Traffic Regulation Act 1984; Building Act 1984; Statute Law (Repeals) Act 1986; Highways (Amendment) Act 1986; Coal Industry Act 1987; Road Traffic (Consequential Provisions) Act 1988; Statute Law (Repeals) Act 1989; Planning (Consequential Provisions) Act 1990; Planning and Compensation Act 1991; Water Consolidation (Consequential Provisions) Act 1991; Statute Law (Repeals) Act 1993; Coal Industry Act 1994; Statute Law (Repeals) Act 1995; Countryside and Rights of Way Act 2000; Land Registration Act 2002; Postal Services Act 2011; Infrastructure Act 2015; Digital Economy Act 2017; Planning and Infrastructure Act 2025

Status: Amended

Text of statute as originally enacted

Revised text of statute as amended

Text of the Highways Act 1980 as in force today (including any amendments) within the United Kingdom, from legislation.gov.uk.

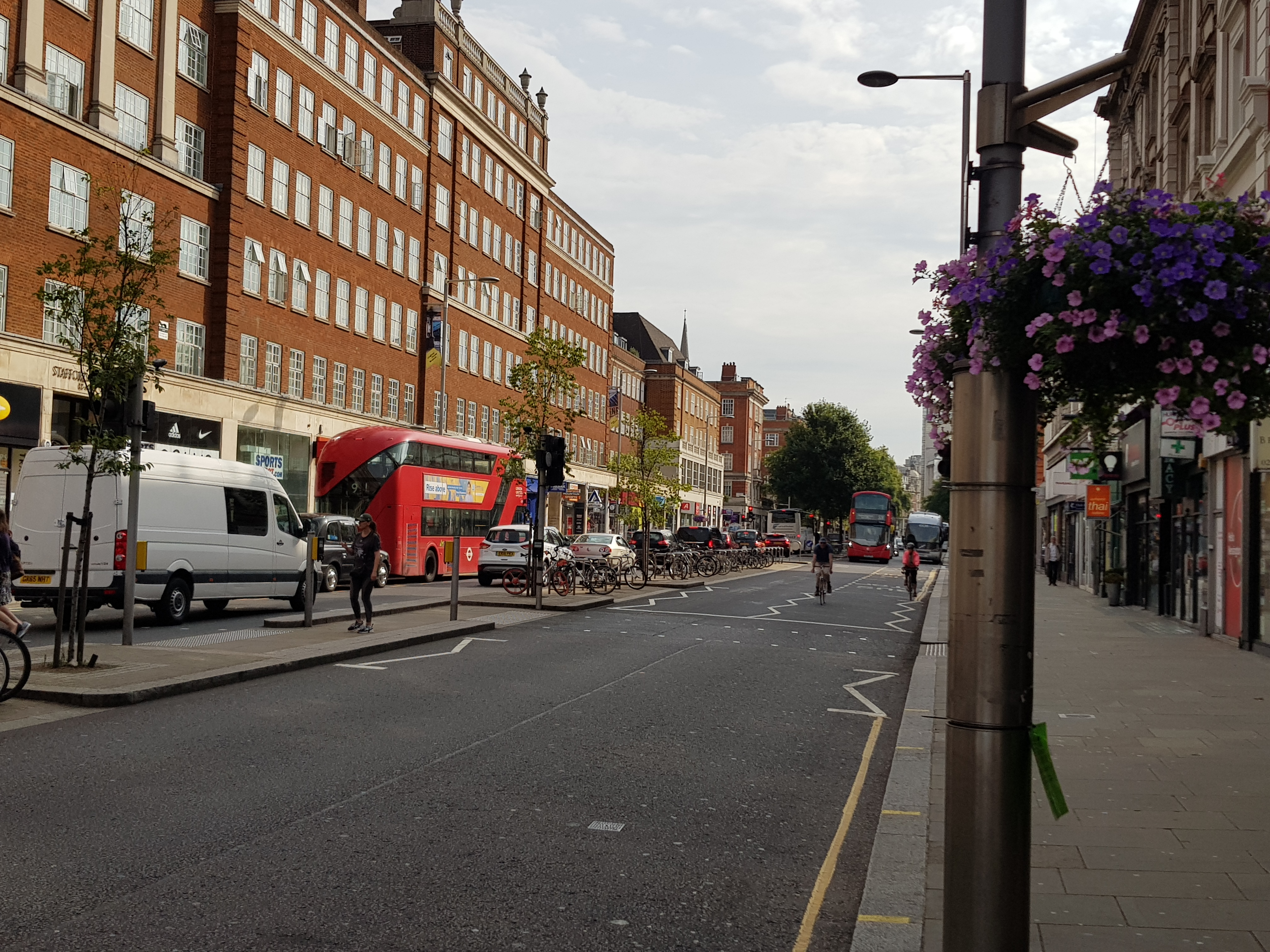
All roads in England and Wales are covered by the Highways Act 1980

The Highways Act 1980 (c. 66) is an act of the Parliament of the United Kingdom dealing with the management and operation of the road network in England and Wales. It consolidated with amendments several earlier pieces of legislation. Many amendments relate only to changes of highway authority, to include new unitary councils and national parks. By virtue of the Local Government (Wales) Act 1994 and the Environment Act 1995, most references to local authority are taken to also include Welsh councils and national park authorities.

By virtue of the National Assembly for Wales (Transfer of Functions) Order 1999 most references to 'the Minister' are taken to include the Senedd. The act is split into 14 parts covering 345 sections, it also includes 25 schedules.

== Part 1: Highway authorities and agreements between authorities ==
Part 1 includes sections 1 to 9 of the act. The legislation contained in these sections covers:

- Highway Authorities
- Agreements between authorities

== Part 2: Trunk roads, classified roads, metropolitan roads, special roads ==
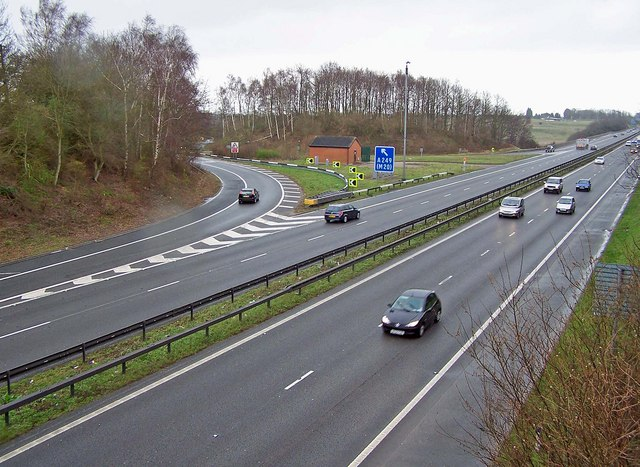
The M2 motorway is an example of a Special Road

Part 2 includes sections 10 to 23 of the act. The legislation contained in these sections covers:

- Trunk roads
- Classified roads
- Metropolitan roads
- Special roads (such as motorways)

== Part 3: Creation of highways ==
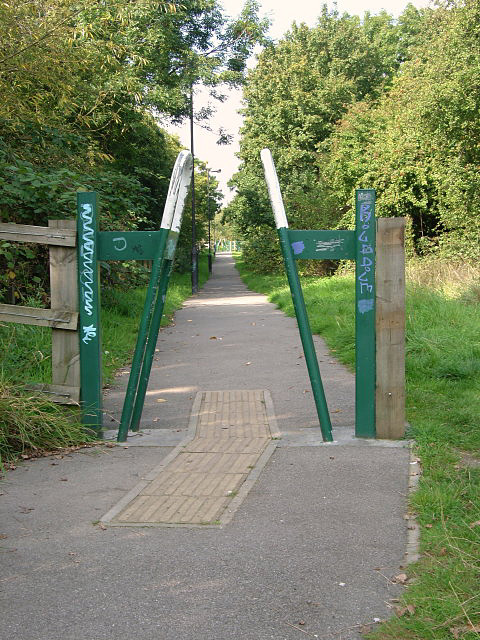
An upgraded footpath at Halfway, Sheffield

Part 3 includes sections 24 to 35 of the act. The legislation contained in these sections covers:

- Creation of new highways
- Creation of new footpaths and bridleways
- Dedication of highways including the 'after public use for 20 years' rule

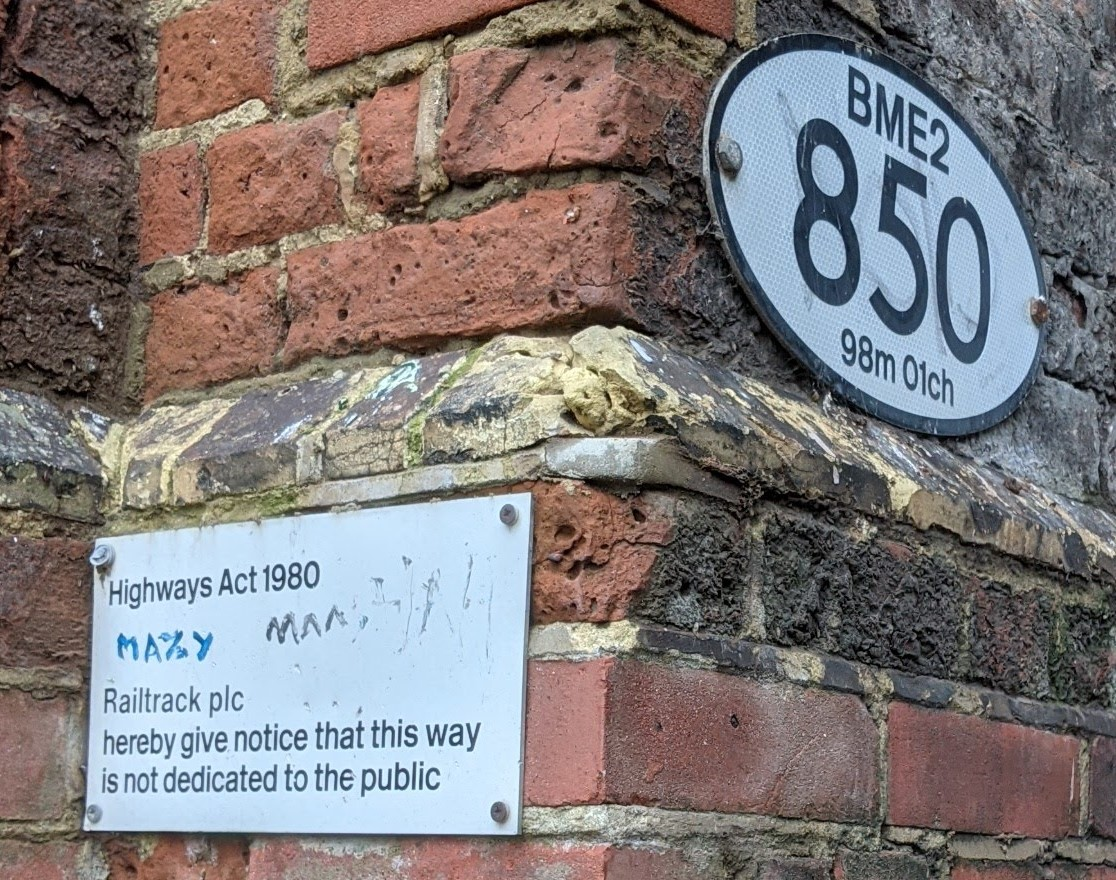
Network Rail notice in relation to Section 31 of the Highways Act 1980.

Private landowners sometimes display a notice quoting Section 31, when there is no dedication of a public right of way.

== Part 4: Maintenance of highways ==
Part 4 includes sections 36 to 61 of the act. The legislation contained in these sections covers:

- Highways maintainable at public expense, and their maintenance
- Maintenance of privately maintainable highways
- Powers covering enforcement of liabilities and recovery of costs
- Defence in respect of specific matters in legal action against a highway authority for damages for non-repair of highway

=== Section 38 Agreement ===
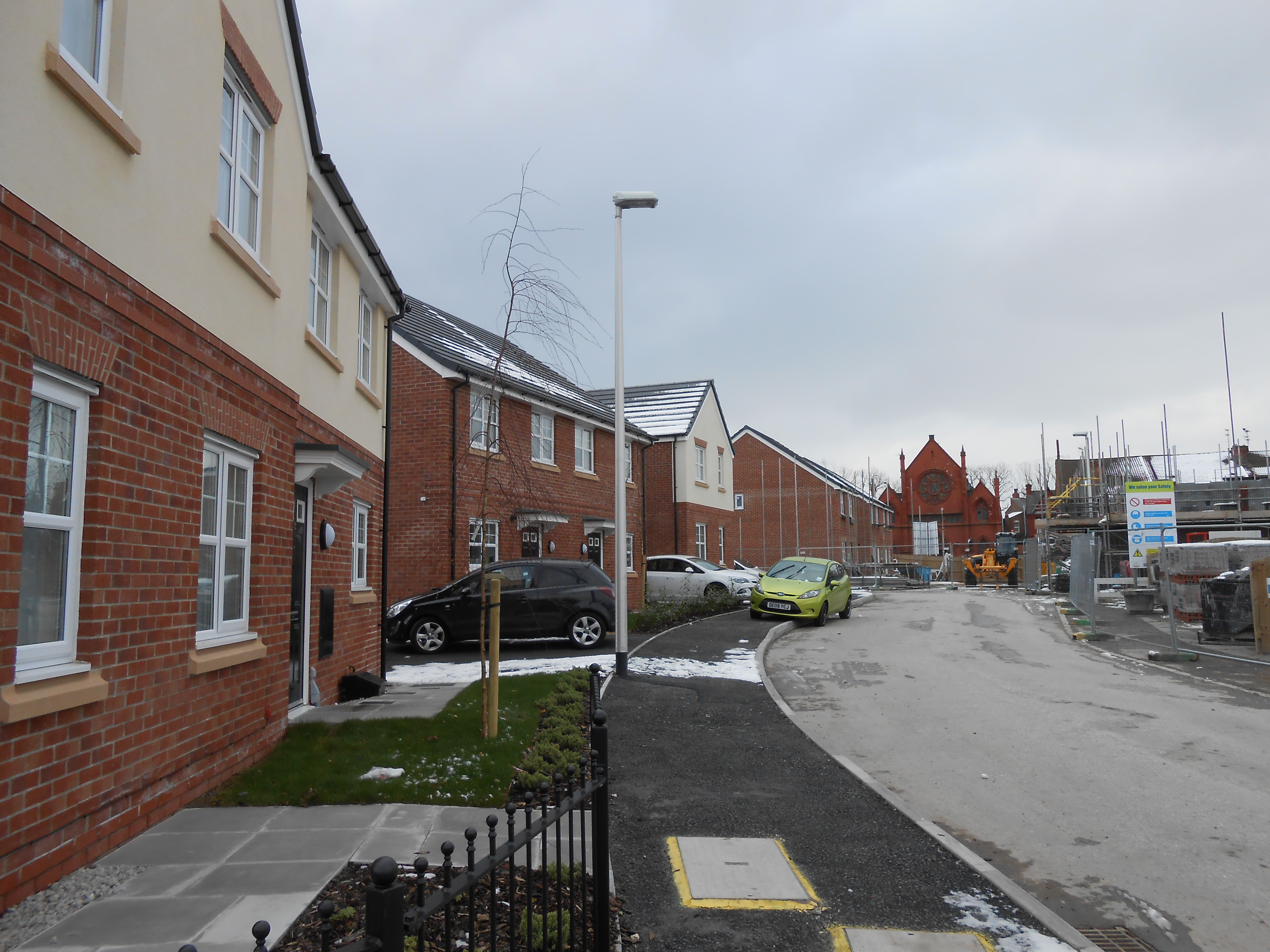
A recently adopted road in Birkenhead

Under Section 38 of the act, the highway authority may agree to adopt private roads. The authority can agree to adopt the street as a highway maintainable at public expense when all the street works have been carried out to their satisfaction, within a stated time. It is customary for the developer to enter into a bond for their performance with a bank or building society.

== Part 5: Improvement of highways ==
Part 5 includes sections 62 to 105 of the act. The legislation contained in these sections covers:

- Various powers to improve highways including – but not limited to:
  - Widening of highways
  - Installation of guardrails
  - Construction, reconstruction and improvement of bridges and the like

== Part 6: Navigable waters and watercourses ==
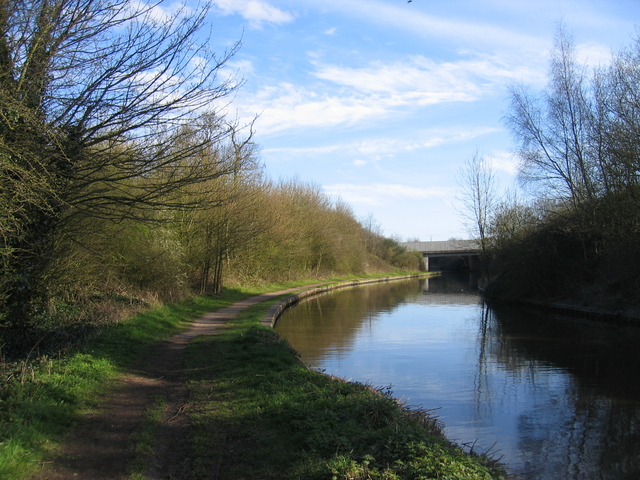
The Worcester and Birmingham Canal was diverted when the M42 motorway (top) was extended to the M5

Part 6 includes sections 106 to 111 of the act. The legislation contained in these sections covers:

- Construction of bridges over and tunnels under navigable waters
- Diversions of watercourses

== Part 7: Provision of special facilities ==
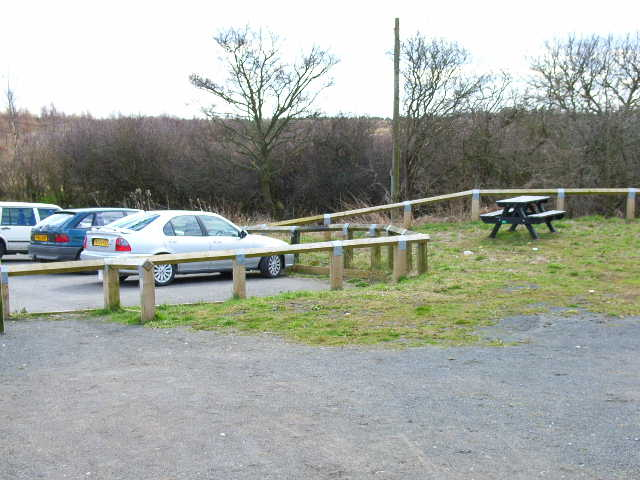
A roadside picnic site in County Durham

Part 7 includes sections 112 to 115 of the act. The legislation contained in these sections covers:

- Provision of picnic sites.
- Provision of public conveniences.
- Provision of areas for parking heavy goods vehicles.

== Part 8: Stopping up of highways ==
Part 8 includes sections 116 to 129 of the act. The legislation contained in these sections covers:

- Stopping up and diversion of highways
- Stopping up means of access to highways

== Part 9: Lawful and unlawful interference with highways ==
Part 9 includes sections 130 to 185 of the act. The legislation contained in these sections covers:

- Protection of public rights
- Damage to highways
- Obstruction of highways
- Danger or annoyance to highway users
- Precautions to be taken in doing certain works
- Request the highway authority to construct a vehicle crossing over a footway or verge in the highway

== Part 10: New streets ==
Part 10 includes sections 186 to 202 of the act. The legislation contained in these sections covers:

- New street byelaws
- Requirements and prohibitions as to new streets
- Enforcement of byelaws

== Part 11: Making up of private streets ==
Part 11 includes sections 203 to 237 of the act. The legislation contained in these sections covers:

- The private street works code
- The advance payments code
- General powers relating to private streets

== Part 12: Acquisition, vesting and transfer of land ==
Part 12 includes sections 238 to 271 of the act. The legislation contained in these sections covers:

- Acquisition of land for highway works
- Compensation relating to compulsory acquisition of land
- Vesting of land
- Transfer of property and liability when the status of a highway changes

== Part 13: Financial provisions ==
Part 13 includes sections 272 to 281 of the act. The legislation contained in these sections covers:

- Various rules on financial transactions relating to highways

=== Section 278 ===
A Section 278 Agreement allows private developers to either fund or complete works to public highways outside or beyond the development site itself, such as traffic calming and capacity improvements. The document is signed by the local highway authority and the developer to ensure that works are completed to the highway authority's satisfaction.

== Part 14: Miscellaneous and supplementary powers ==
Part 14 includes sections 282 to 345 of the act. The legislation contained in these sections covers:

- Various supplementary powers including – but not limited to:

Inquiries
Disputes over compensation
Prosecutions and appeals
Regulations, schemes and orders

=== Repealed enactments ===
Section 343(3) of the act repealed 37 enactments, listed in schedule 25 to the act.

Citation	Short title	Extent of repeal
7 & 8 Eliz. 2. c. 25	Highways Act 1959	The whole act.
7 & 8 Eliz. 2. c. 53	Town and Country Planning Act 1959	Sections 48 and 49.
8 & 9 Eliz. 2. c. 63	Road Traffic and Roads Improvement Act 1960	Sections 18 to 20. Section 23(1).
9 & 10 Eliz. 2. c. 24	Private Street Works Act 1961	The whole act.
9 & 10 Eliz. 2. c. 63	Highways (Miscellaneous Provisions) Act 1961	The whole act.
9 & 10 Eliz. 2. c. 64	Public Health Act 1961	Sections 43 and 44. Sections 46 to 50. In Schedule 1, in Part III, the entries relating to the Highways Act 1959.
10 & 11 Eliz. 2. c. 46	Transport Act 1962	In Schedule 2, in Part I, the entries relating to the Highways Act 1959.
10 & 11 Eliz. 2. c. 58	Pipelines Act 1962	Section 19.
1963 c. 33	London Government Act 1963	Section 14(1) to (4). Sections 16 to 18. In Schedule 5, in Part II, paragraphs 6 to 8. Schedule 6. In Schedule 9, in Part II, in paragraph 5, the words from "and" to the end. In Schedule 11, in Part I, paragraph 37.
1965 c. 24	Severn Bridge Tolls Act 1965	In section 22(2) the words "(whether before or after the passing of this Act)".
1965 c. 30	Highways (Amendment) Act 1965	The whole act.
1965 c. 56	Compulsory Purchase Act 1965	In Schedule 6, the entry relating to the Highways Act 1959.
1965 c. 59	New Towns Act 1965	Section 48(3).
1966 c. 42	Local Government Act 1966	Part III.
1967 c. 76	Road Traffic Regulation Act 1967	In Schedule 6, the entry relating to section 14(2) of the London Government Act 1963.
1967 c. 80	Criminal Justice Act 1967	In Schedule 3, the entries relating to the Highways Act 1959.
1968 c. 13	National Loans Act 1968	In section 6(1), the words "section 198(2) of the Highways Act 1959".
1968 c. 41	Countryside Act 1968	Sections 28 and 29. Section 47(5). In Schedule 3, in Part I, the entries relating to the Highways Act 1959.
1968 c. 72	Town and Country Planning Act 1968	In Schedule 9, paragraph 9.
1968 c. 73	Transport Act 1968	Section 130(6)(e). In section 139(1), in paragraph (a), the words "section 215(2)(c) of the Highways Act 1959 or", in paragraph (b), the words "section 180, 188 or 189 of the Town and Country Planning Act 1971 or" and "215(2)(c) or", and in paragraph (c) the words "section 193 of the said Act of 1971 or" and "section 196 of the said Act of 1971 or, as the case may be," and "215(2)(c) or". In section 139(2), in the definition of "relevant planning permission", the words "section 15 or 16 of the Land Compensation Act 1961 or", in the definition of "service area development" the words "the said section 215(2)(c) or", and (in the concluding part of the subsection) the words "1961 or" and "as respects England and Wales, as in the said Act of 1961 and,". Section 140. In Schedule 16, paragraph 7(2)(f).
1969 c. 35	Transport (London) Act 1969	Sections 29 and 31. Section 34(1).
1969 c. 48	Post Office Act 1969	In Schedule 4, paragraphs 65 and 69 and paragraph 93(1)(xv).
1971 c. 23	Courts Act 1971	In Schedule 8, in Part II, paragraph 36. In Schedule 9, in Parts I and II, the entries relating to the Highways Act 1959.
1971 c. 41	Highways Act 1971	The whole act.
1971 c. 75	Civil Aviation Act 1971	In Schedule 5, paragraph 5(m) and (ee).
1971 c. 78	Town and Country Planning Act 1971	In section 16, paragraph (c). In Schedule 23, in Part II, the entries relating to the Highways Act 1959, the Highways Act 1971 and section 139(1) of the Transport Act 1968.
1972 c. 60	Gas Act 1972	In Schedule 4, in paragraph 1(6) the words "section 15 of the Highways Act 1959 and".
1972 c. 70	Local Government Act 1972	Section 187(1), (2), (3)(b) and (4) to (8). Section 188. Schedule 20. In Schedule 21, Part I and, in Part II, paragraphs 99 and 100.
1973 c. 26	Land Compensation Act 1973	Section 20(10). Sections 22 to 25. Section 74(1)(a). Section 78(5). Section 87(3).
1973 c. 37	Water Act 1973	In Schedule 8, paragraphs 70 and 71.
1974 c. 7	Local Government Act 1974	In section 6(8) the words "the Highways Act 1959 and". Section 40. In Schedule 1, in Part II, in paragraph 6, paragraph (a) and the words "paragraph (a)". In Schedule 6, entry number 12. In Schedule 7, paragraph 2.
1975 c. 76	Local Land Charges Act 1975	In Schedule 1, the entries relating to the Highways Act 1959 and the Highways Act 1971.
1976 c. 37	Local Government (Miscellaneous Provisions) Act 1976	Sections 1 to 6. In section 44(1) in the definition of "statutory undertakers" the words from "and except" to "highways)". In Schedule 2, the entries relating to the Highways Act 1959 and the Highways (Miscellaneous Provisions) Act 1961.
1976 c. 70	Land Drainage Act 1976	In Schedule 7, paragraphs 2 and 7.
1977 c. 45	Criminal Law Act 1977	In Schedule 6, the entry relating to the Highways Act 1959.
1980 c. 43	Magistrates' Courts Act 1980	In Schedule 7, paragraph 29.
1980 c. 65	Local Government, Planning and Land Act 1980	In Schedule 7, paragraphs 1(2), 2(1), (2)(b), (3) and (4), 3(1), (3) and 5.

== Schedules ==
The act contains 26 schedules.

== See also ==
- Highway Act
- Highways in England and Wales
