= 1968 in the environment =

This is a list of notable events relating to the environment in 1968. They relate to environmental law, conservation, environmentalism and environmental issues.

== Events ==
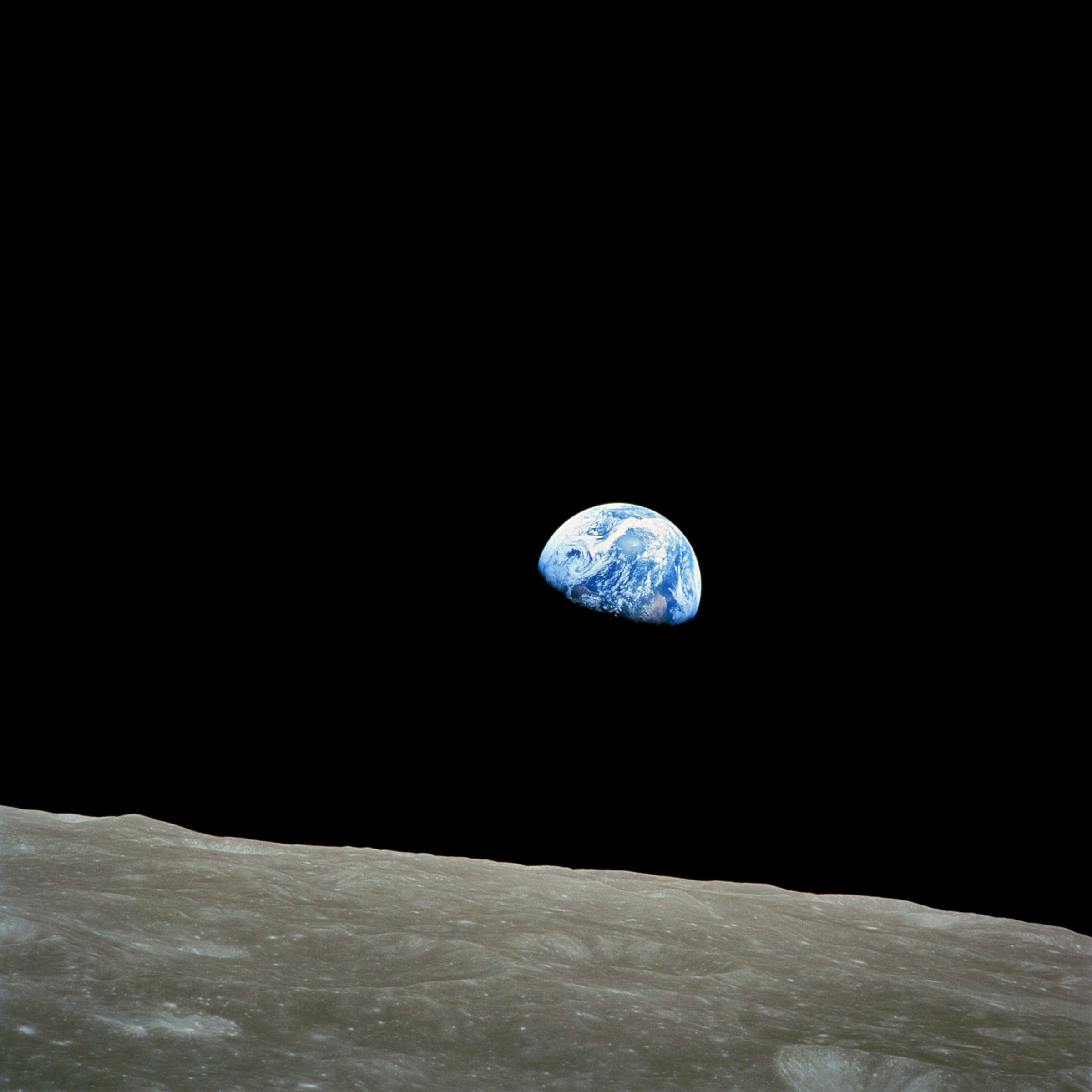
Earthrise, taken on December 24, 1968, during Apollo 8

- The Conservancy Association, a Hong Kong non-governmental environmental organisation, is established
- Desert Solitaire is published. An autobiographical work by American writer Edward Abbey, it is recognised as an iconic work of nature writing and a staple of early environmentalist writing.
- The Population Bomb is published. Written by Paul R. Ehrlich and his wife, Anne Ehrlich, it warned of the mass starvation of humans in the 1970s and 1980s due to overpopulation, as well as other major societal upheavals, and advocated immediate action to limit population growth.

June

- The African Convention on the Conservation of Nature and Natural Resources, a continent-wide agreement, is signed.

July

- The Countryside Act 1968 was passed in the United Kingdom, among other things it established the creation of country parks.

October

- The National Wild and Scenic Rivers System was created in the United States by the Wild and Scenic Rivers Act of 1968, to preserve certain rivers with outstanding natural, cultural, and recreational values in a free-flowing condition.

December

- "Earthrise", labelled as the most influential environmental photograph, is taken by astronaut William Anders during the Apollo 8 space mission.
- The United Nations General Assembly adopted Resolution 2398(XXIII), in which it decided to convene a United Nations Conference on the Human Environment (held in 1972) with one of the primary aims being to establish a declaration on the human environment, the first UN declaration on the global environment.

== See also ==
- Human impact on the environment
- List of environmental issues
- List of years in the environment
