= Acquisition of Land Act 1981 =

Act of the Parliament of the United Kingdom

Acquisition of Land Act 1981 (Note: Section 35(1).)
- Act of Parliament
- Parliament of the United Kingdom
- Long title: An Act to consolidate the Acquisition of Land (Authorisation Procedure) Act 1946 and related enactments.
- Citation: 1981 c. 67
- Territorial extent: England and Wales (Note: Section 35(3).)

Dates
- Royal assent: 30 October 1981
- Commencement: 30 January 1982 (Note: Section 35(2).)

Other legislation
- Amends: Metropolitan Police Act 1886; Land Settlement (Facilities) Act 1919; Town Development Act 1952; Atomic Energy Authority Act 1954; Slaughterhouses Act 1974; Rent Act 1977; Refuse Disposal (Amenity) Act 1978; See § Repealed enactments
- Amended by: Civil Aviation Act 1982; Industrial Development Act 1982; Iron and Steel Act 1982; Energy Act 1983; Road Traffic Regulation Act 1984; Food Act 1984; Housing (Consequential Provisions) Act 1985; Statute Law (Repeals) Act 1986; Airports Act 1986; Coal Industry Act 1987; Planning (Consequential Provisions) Act 1990; Water Consolidation (Consequential Provisions) Act 1991; Statute Law (Repeals) Act 1993; Coal Industry Act 1994; Statute Law (Repeals) Act 2004; National Health Service (Consequential Provisions) Act 2006; Postal Services Act 2011; Policing and Crime Act 2017; Planning and Infrastructure Act 2025

Status: Amended

Text of statute as originally enacted

Revised text of statute as amended

Text of the Acquisition of Land Act 1981 as in force today (including any amendments) within the United Kingdom, from legislation.gov.uk.

The Acquisition of Land Act 1981 (c. 67) is an act of the Parliament of the United Kingdom, which concerns English land law and compulsory purchase.

== Provisions ==
The act regulates the conditions for granting a "Compulsory Purchase Order" in the UK.

=== Repealed enactments ===
Section 34(3) of the act repealed 61 enactments, listed in parts I and II of schedule 6 to the act, and revoked 6 instruments, listed in part III of schedule 6 to the act.

Part I
Citation	Short title	Extent of repeal
9 & 10 Geo. 6. c. 49	Acquisition of Land (Authorisation Procedure) Act 1946	The whole act except sections 6(1) and 10 and Schedule 4.
10 & 11 Geo. 6. c. 41	Fire Services Act 1947	In section 3(5) the words from "as if" to the end of the subsection.
10 & 11 Geo. 6. c. 41	Fire Services Act 1947	In section 8(3) the words " The Acquisition of Land (Authorisation Procedure) Act 1946 and " and the words " in the said Act of 1946 and ".
10 & 11 Geo. 6. c. 48	Agriculture Act 1947	In section 92(1) the words from " and that Act" to the end of the subsection.
10 & 11 Geo. 6. c. 51	Town and Country Planning Act 1947	Section 49(8).
10 & 11 Geo. 6. c. 51	Town and Country Planning Act 1947	In section 119(1) the definitions of " land " and " local authority ".
10 & 11 Geo. 6. c. 51	Town and Country Planning Act 1947	In Schedule 8 the amendments of the Acquisition of Land (Authorisation Procedure) Act 1946.
10 & 11 Geo. 6. c. 54	Electricity Act 1947	In section 9, in subsection (1) the words from " as if" to the end of the subsection.
11 & 12 Geo. 6. c. 22	Water Act 1948	In the Schedule, in paragraph 8(1) the words from "the Act of 1946" to "and the expression ".
12, 13 & 14 Geo. 6. c. 67	Civil Aviation Act 1949	In section 19(2A) the words from " as if" to the end of the subsection.
12, 13 & 14 Geo. 6. c. 67	Civil Aviation Act 1949	In section 23(3) the words from " as if" to the end of the proviso.
12, 13 & 14 Geo. 6. c. 74	Coast Protection Act 1949	In section 14(1) the words " as if this Act had been in force immediately before the commencement of that Act".
12, 13 & 14 Geo. 6. c. 97	National Parks and Access to the Countryside Act 1949	In section 103 subsections (2) and (4) and in subsection (6) the words from " and the provisions" to the end of the subsection.
14 & 15 Geo. 6. c. 60	Mineral Workings Act 1951	In section 17(3) the words from "as if" to the end of the subsection.
15 & 16 Geo. 6 & 1 Eliz. 2. c. 52	Prison Act 1952	In section 36(2) the words from "as if" to the end of the subsection.
15 & 16 Geo. 6 & 1 Eliz. 2. c. 54	Town Development Act 1952	In section 6(4) the words from "as if" to the end of the subsection.
1953 c. 49	Historic Buildings and Ancient Monuments Act 1953	In section 20 paragraph (a).
2 & 3 Eliz. 2. c. 32	Atomic Energy Act 1954	In section 5(1) the words from " as if " to " commencement thereof".
4 & 5 Eliz. 2. c. 16	Food and Drugs Act 1955	In section 130(3) the words from " as if" to the end of the subsection.
4 & 5 Eliz. 2. c. 59	Underground Works (London) Act 1956	In section 6(6) the words from " and that Act" to the end of the subsection.
5 & 6 Eliz. 2. c. 56	Housing Act 1957	In Schedule 1, in paragraph 1(1), the words "as if this Act had been in force immediately before the commencement of that Act".
5 & 6 Eliz. 2. c. 56	Housing Act 1957	In Schedule 7, in paragraph 1(1), the words "as if this Act had been in force immediately before the commencement of that Act".
6 & 7 Eliz. 2. c. 69	Opencast Coal Act 1958	Section 4(5).
6 & 7 Eliz. 2. c. 69	Opencast Coal Act 1958	Section 16(5).
6 & 7 Eliz. 2. c. 69	Opencast Coal Act 1958	In section 47(2) the words from "(including" to "this Act)".
6 & 7 Eliz. 2. c. 69	Opencast Coal Act 1958	In section 51(1) the definition of " the Acquisition of Land Act".
6 & 7 Eliz. 2. c. 69	Opencast Coal Act 1958	In Schedule 2 Part I.
6 & 7 Eliz. 2. c. 69	Opencast Coal Act 1958	In Schedule 10 paragraph 7.
8 & 9 Eliz. 2. c. 62	Caravan Sites and Control of Development Act 1960	In section 24(6) the words from "as if" to the end of the subsection.
9 & 10 Eliz. 2. c. 33	Land Compensation Act 1961	In Schedule 4 paragraphs 6 and 7.
10 & 11 Eliz. 2. c. 46	Transport Act 1962	In section 15, in subsection (1) the words from " as if" to " that Act".
1963 c. 33	London Government Act 1963	In Schedule 17 paragraph 8.
1963 c. 38	Water Resources Act 1963	In section 65(3) the words from " and accordingly" to the end of the subsection.
1963 c. 38	Water Resources Act 1963	Section 71(5).
1963 c. 38	Water Resources Act 1963	In Schedule 8 paragraph 17.
1964 c. 48	Police Act 1964	In section 9(3) the words " and the Acquisition of Land (Authorisation Procedure) Act 1946 ".
1965 c. 36	Gas Act 1965	In section 12(1) the words from " and Part I" to the end of the subsection.
1965 c. 36	Gas Act 1965	In section 13(2) the words from " and Part I" to the end of the subsection.
1965 c. 36	Gas Act 1965	In section 13(3) the words " and Part I of Schedule 4 to this Act shall apply in relation to the compulsory purchase ".
1965 c. 36	Gas Act 1965	In Schedule 4 paragraphs 1 and 2.
1965 c. 56	Compulsory Purchase Act 1965	In section 1, in subsections (2) and (3) the words " under the Act of 1946 ".
1965 c. 56	Compulsory Purchase Act 1965	In Schedule 7 the amendment of the Agriculture Act 1947.
1967 c. 22	Agriculture Act 1967	In section 51(7) the words from "as if" to "commencement of that Act".
1967 c. 22	Agriculture Act 1967	In Schedule 5, in paragraph 7(1) the words from " Acquisition of Land" where they first occur to " case may be ", paragraph 7(2) and in paragraph 7(3) the words from the beginning to " public local inquiries)".
1967 c. 76	Road Traffic Regulation Act 1967	In section 30(1) the words from " as if " to " commencement of that Act".
1968 c. 41	Countryside Act 1968	In Part I of Schedule 3 the entry relating to the Acquisition of Land (Authorisation Procedure) Act 1946 (that is, all between the entries relating to the Water Act 1945 and the Highways Act 1959).
1968 c. 72	Town and Country Planning Act 1968	Section 31.
1968 c. 72	Town and Country Planning Act 1968	Section 59.
1969 c. 33	Housing Act 1969	In section 32(2) the words from "as if" to the end of the subsection.
1969 c. 48	Post Office Act 1969	In section 55(1) the words from "as if" to the end of the subsection.
1969 c. 48	Post Office Act 1969	In Schedule 4, in paragraph 93 sub-paragraphs (1)(iv) and (2)(iv).
1971 c. 75	Civil Aviation Act 1971	In Schedule 5 paragraph 5(b).
1971 c. 78	Town and Country Planning Act 1971	In section 112(4) the words from "and accordingly" to the end of the subsection.
1971 c. 78	Town and Country Planning Act 1971	In section 113(3) the words from " as it applies " to the end of the subsection.
1971 c. 78	Town and Country Planning Act 1971	In section 114(5) the words from " and accordingly " to the end of the subsection.
1971 c. 78	Town and Country Planning Act 1971	In section 218(2) the words from " and accordingly " to the end of the subsection.
1971 c. 78	Town and Country Planning Act 1971	Section 229.
1971 c. 78	Town and Country Planning Act 1971	In Schedule 23 the amendment of the Town and Country Planning Act 1968.
1972 c. 60	Gas Act 1972	In Schedule 2, in paragraph 5 the words " The Act of 1946 and ", and paragraphs 6 to 11.
1972 c. 70	Local Government Act 1972	In section 121(4) the words from " as if" to the end of the subsection.
1972 c. 70	Local Government Act 1972	In section 125(4) the words from " as if that subsection " to " commencement of that Act ".
1973 c. 26	Land Compensation Act 1973	Section 64.
1974 c. 3	Slaughterhouses Act 1974	In section 30(2) the words from " as if" to the end of the subsection.
1974 c. 44	Housing Act 1974	In section 3(4) the words from "as if" (where they first occur) to the end of the subsection.
1974 c. 44	Housing Act 1974	In section 43(2) the words from "as if" to the end of the subsection.
1975 c. 56	Coal Industry Act 1975	In Schedule 3 paragraph 10.
1975 c. 64	Iron and Steel Act 1975	In section 9(1) the words from "as if" to the end of the subsection.
1975 c. 70	Welsh Development Agency Act 1975	In section 22(5) the words from "as if" to the end of the subsection.
1975 c. 78	Airports Authority Act 1975	In section 17(1) the words from " as if" to the end of the subsection.
1975 c. 78	Airports Authority Act 1975	In section 19(1) the entry relating to the Acquisition of Land (Authorisation Procedure) Act 1946.
1976 c. 57	Local Government (Miscellaneous Provisions) Act 1976	In section 13, in subsection (2) the words from the beginning to " 1946 and", subsection (3)(a) and in subsection (3)(b) the words from " (which relates " to " Act of 1946) ". (Note: The repeals in section 13 of the Local Government (Miscellaneous Provisions) Act 1976 shall not affect section 82(1) of that Act (power to make consequential repeals or amendments).)
1976 c. 57	Local Government (Miscellaneous Provisions) Act 1976	In Schedule 1 Part I.
1976 c. 70	Land Drainage Act 1976	In section 37(2) the words from "as if" to the end of the subsection.
1976 c. 75	Development of Rural Wales Act 1976	In section 6, in subsection (2) the words (following paragraph (b)) from " and for the purpose " to the end of the subsection, in subsection (6) the words from the beginning to " 1946 and", subsection (7)(a) and in subsection (7)(b) the words from " (which relates " to " Act of 1946) ".
1976 c. 75	Development of Rural Wales Act 1976	In Schedule 4 Part I.
1976 c. 80	Rent (Agriculture) Act 1976	In Schedule 8 paragraph 3.
1977 c. 42	Rent Act 1977	In Schedule 23 paragraph 11.
1978 c. 3	Refuse Disposal (Amenity) Act 1978	In section 7 the words from "as if" to the end of the section.
1979 c. 46	Ancient Monuments and Archaeological Areas Act 1979	In section 10(2) the words from " as it" to the end of the subsection.
1979 c. 46	Ancient Monuments and Archaeological Areas Act 1979	In section 16(9) the words from " as it" to the end of the subsection.
1980 c. 65	Local Government, Planning and Land Act 1980	In section 104(3) the words from " as if" to the end of the subsection.
1980 c. 65	Local Government, Planning and Land Act 1980	In section 120(1) in paragraph (a) the words from " 6th April 1976 " to " Scotland ", and in paragraph (6) the words from " the Peak " to " Planning Board ".
1980 c. 65	Local Government, Planning and Land Act 1980	In section 120(2) the words " the Act of 1946 or, as the case may be " and the words " the National Trust or ".
1980 c. 65	Local Government, Planning and Land Act 1980	Section 120(3), except for the definition of " statutory undertakers", and in paragraph (b) of that definition the words " the Town and Country Planning Act 1971 or".
1980 c. 65	Local Government, Planning and Land Act 1980	In section 120(5) the words " in section 2 of the New Towns Act 1965 or ".
1980 c. 65	Local Government, Planning and Land Act 1980	In section 142(3) the words " The 1946 Act and " and in paragraph (a) the words " the 1946 Act or (as the case may be)".
1980 c. 65	Local Government, Planning and Land Act 1980	In section 143(4) the words " The 1946 Act and " and the words " the 1946 Act or (as the case may be) ".
1980 c. 65	Local Government, Planning and Land Act 1980	In Schedule 17, in paragraph 5 the entry (in both columns) for section 41 of the 1975 Act.
1980 c. 65	Local Government, Planning and Land Act 1980	In Schedule 20 paragraph 3.
1980 c. 65	Local Government, Planning and Land Act 1980	In Schedule 21 paragraph 14.
1980 c. 65	Local Government, Planning and Land Act 1980	In Schedule 23 paragraph 1.
1980 c. 65	Local Government, Planning and Land Act 1980	In Schedule 28 paragraph 3, in paragraph 21(1) the words " The 1946 Act and ", paragraph 21(2)(a) and paragraph 22.
1980 c. 66	Highways Act 1980	In section 250(4) the words " 1946 and ". In section 329(1) the definition of the "Act of 1946 ".
1980 c. 66	Highways Act 1980	Section 340(2)(c).
1980 c. 66	Highways Act 1980	In Schedule 19 Part I.
1981 c. 22	Animal Health Act 1981	In section 55(3) the words " the Acquisition of Land (Authorisation Procedure) Act 1946 and ".
1981 c. 38	British Telecommunications Act 1981	In Schedule 3 paragraphs 10(1)(a) and 11(1)(a).

Part II – Spent Provisions
Citation	Short title	Extent of repeal
23 & 24 Geo. 5. c. 12	Children and Young Persons Act 1933	Section 96(5).
9 & 10 Geo. 6. c. 49	Acquisition of Land (Authorisation Procedure) Act 1946	In Schedule 4 the amendment of the Children and Young Persons Act 1933.
10 & 11 Geo. 6. c. 41	Fire Services Act 1947	In section 3(5) the proviso.
10 & 11 Geo. 6. c. 54	Electricity Act 1947	In subsections (1) and (2) of section 9 the words " (except section two thereof)".
11 & 12 Geo. 6. c. 29	National Assistance Act 1948	Section 58.
12, 13 & 14 Geo. 6. c. 26	Public Works (Festival of Britain) Act 1949	Section 5(7)(a).
12, 13 & 14 Geo. 6. c. 67	Civil Aviation Act 1949	In section 28(6) the words " except section 2 thereof ".

Part III – Statutory Instruments
Citation	Title	Extent of revocation
SI 1965/145	Transfer of Functions (Shipping and Construction of Ships) Order 1965	In Schedule 1 the entry relating to the Acquisition of Land (Authorisation Procedure) Act 1946.
SI 1965/319	Secretary of State for Wales and Minister of Land and Natural Resources Order 1965	In Part I of Schedule 1 the entry relating to the Acquisition of Land (Authorisation Procedure) Act 1946.
SI 1967/486	Transfer of Functions (Miscellaneous) Order 1967	In Schedule 2 the amendment of the Acquisition of Land (Authorisation Procedure) Act 1946.
SI 1969/388	Transfer of Functions (Wales) Order 1969	Article 4(1)(c).
SI 1970/1681	Secretary of State for the Environment Order 1970	In Schedule 3 paragraph 15.
SI 1976/1775	Secretary of State for Transport Order 1976	In Schedule 2 paragraph 4.

== See also ==
- English land law
- Compulsory purchase
- Re Ellenborough Park [1955] EWCA Civ 4, [1956] Ch 131

== Bibliography ==
- K Gray and SF Gray, Land Law (7th edn 2011) Ch 11
- K Gray and S Gray, ‘Private Property and Public Propriety’, in J McLean (ed), Property and the Constitution (Hart 1999) 36-7
