= Mineral policy statements =

In the United Kingdom, mineral policy statements (MPS) are statements of the British Government's national policy on minerals and planning issues and provide advice and guidance to local authorities and the minerals industry on policies and the operation of the planning system with regard to minerals.

Mineral planning authorities must take their contents into account in preparing their Development plans. The guidance may also be material to decisions on individual planning applications and appeals.

Under the provisions of the Planning and Compulsory Purchase Act 2004, they are gradually replacing Minerals planning guidance notes, (MPGs).

MPS2 contained information on managing the harms of minerals extraction.

MPS's Introduced so far:

- Minerals Policy Statement 2: Controlling and mitigating the environmental effects of mineral extraction in England

== See also ==
- Town and country planning in the United Kingdom
- Town and Country Planning Act 1990
- Planning and Compulsory Purchase Act 2004
