= Refuse Disposal (Amenity) Act 1978 =

Act of the Parliament of the United Kingdom

Refuse Disposal (Amenity) Act 1978 (Note: Section 13(1).)
- Act of Parliament
- Parliament of the United Kingdom
- Long title: An Act to consolidate certain enactments relating to abandoned vehicles and other refuse.
- Citation: 1978 c. 3
- Territorial extent: England and Wales; Scotland; (Note: Section 13(5).)

Dates
- Royal assent: 23 March 1978
- Commencement: 23 April 1978 (Note: Section 13(2).)

Other legislation
- Amends: See § Repealed enactments
- Repeals/revokes: See § Repealed enactments
- Amended by: Criminal Procedure (Scotland) Act 1975; Interpretation Act 1978; Local Government, Planning and Land Act 1980; Highways Act 1980; Acquisition of Land Act 1981; Local Government and Planning (Scotland) Act 1982; Roads (Scotland) Act 1984; Local Government Act 1985; Waste Regulation and Disposal (Authorities) Order 1985; Airports Act 1986; Planning (Consequential Provisions) Act 1990; Vehicle Excise and Registration Act 1994; Local Government etc. (Scotland) Act 1994; Environmental Protection Act 1990; Criminal Procedure (Consequential Provisions) (Scotland) Act 1995; Planning (Consequential Provisions) (Scotland) Act 1997; London Local Authorities Act 2004; Clean Neighbourhoods and Environment Act 2005

Status: Amended

Text of statute as originally enacted

Revised text of statute as amended

Text of the Refuse Disposal (Amenity) Act 1978 as in force today (including any amendments) within the United Kingdom, from legislation.gov.uk.

The Refuse Disposal (Amenity) Act 1978 (c. 3) is an act of the Parliament of the United Kingdom that consolidated enactments relating to abandoned vehicles and other refuse in Great Britain.

== Provisions ==
=== Repealed enactments ===
Section 12(2) of the act repealed 7 enactments, listed in schedule 2 to the act.

Enactments repealed by section 12(2)
Citation	Short title	Extent of repeal
1967 c. 69	Civic Amenities Act 1967	Sections 18 to 24.
1967 c. 69	Civic Amenities Act 1967	Sections 27 and 28.
1967 c. 69	Civic Amenities Act 1967	In section 30(1), the definitions of "the Common Council", "local authority", "local planning authority" and "owner".
1969 c. 27	Vehicle and Driving Licences Act 1969	Section 29(3).
1971 c. 78	Town and Country Planning Act 1971	In Schedule 23, Part II, the entry relating to section 28 of the Civic Amenities Act 1967.
1972 c. 52	Town and Country Planning (Scotland) Act 1972	In Schedule 21, Part II, the entry relating to section 28(4) of the Civic Amenities Act 1967.
1972 c. 70	Local Government Act 1972	Section 186(2).
1972 c. 70	Local Government Act 1972	In Schedule 14, paragraph 45.
1972 c. 70	Local Government Act 1972	In Schedule 19, Part III.
1973 c. 65	Local Government (Scotland) Act 1973	In Schedule 27, Part II, paragraphs 169 and 170.
1974 c. 40	Control of Pollution Act 1974	In Schedule 3, paragraph 25.
