= Countryside Act 1968 =

Act of the Parliament of the United Kingdom

Countryside Act 1968 (Note: Section 50(1).)
- Act of Parliament
- Parliament of the United Kingdom
- Long title: An Act to enlarge the functions of the Commission established under the National Parks and Access to the Countryside Act 1949, to confer new powers on local authorities and other bodies for the conservation and enhancement of natural beauty and for the benefit of those resorting to the countryside and to make other provision for the matters dealt with in the Act of 1949 and generally as respects the countryside, and to amend the law about trees and woodlands, and footpaths and bridleways, and other public paths.
- Citation: 1968 c. 41
- Territorial extent: England and Wales (Note: Section 50(4)–(5).)

Dates
- Royal assent: 3 July 1968
- Commencement: 3 August 1968 (Note: Section 50(3).)
Other legislation
Amends	National Parks and Access to the Countryside Act 1949; Forestry Act 1967
Amended by	New Forest Act 1970; Town and Country Planning Act 1971; Road Traffic Act 1972; Town and Country Planning (Scotland) Act 1972; House of Commons Disqualification Act 1975; Highways Act 1980; Acquisition of Land Act 1981; Road Traffic Regulation Act 1984; Countryside and Rights of Way Act 2000; Abolition of Feudal Tenure etc. (Scotland) Act 2000; Commons Act 2006
Relates to	Countryside (Scotland) Act 1967

Status: Amended

Text of statute as originally enacted

Revised text of statute as amended

Text of the Countryside Act 1968 as in force today (including any amendments) within the United Kingdom, from legislation.gov.uk.

The Countryside Act 1968 (c. 41) is an act of the Parliament of the United Kingdom which enlarged the conservation and recreation functions of the existing National Parks Commission and renamed it the Countryside Commission. It provided for the establishment of country parks and gave local authorities certain powers in respect of the management of common land and of the provision of camping and picnicking sites and provided for grants to such bodies for their establishment. It provided for the employment of countryside wardens and for the making of byelaws in connection with such facilities.

The Countryside (Scotland) Act 1967 made equivalent provisions for Scotland.

The act conferred powers on certain authorities to exercise control over boating on waterbodies within national parks and over the conversion of moorland and heathland to agriculture. It put in place provisions regarding ‘areas of special scientific value’ and access to ‘open country’ as defined in the National Parks and Access to the Countryside Act 1949 (12, 13 & 14 Geo. 6. c. 97) and made other amendments to the 1949 act.

It conferred upon water undertakers and the Forestry Commission powers to provide for public access and enjoyment in and around reservoirs and forests, and amended aspects of the Forestry Act 1967, including provision for compensation in respect of the making of tree preservation orders.

The act gave powers and duties to highway authorities in respect of the signing of public paths and in respect of the maintenance of stiles and gates on paths. It introduced provisions regarding the ploughing and reinstatement of public paths during agricultural operations and also provided for bicycles to use public bridleways. Further provision was made as regards traffic regulation orders in parts of the countryside.

Certain other miscellaneous provisions were made by the act.

== Background ==
The Countryside in 1970 conferences held in 1963 and 1965 led to the publication in 1966 of a Government white paper called Leisure in the Countryside which proposed inter alia, the creation of country parks near to centres of population so as to ease pressures on wilder areas. The next year the publication of the report of the Gosling Committee recommended a suite of proposals concerning access to the countryside. The Countryside Bill which was then introduced to Parliament was informed by these two reports.

== See also ==
- 1968 in the environment
