= Local Government, Planning and Land Act 1980 =

Act of the Parliament of the United Kingdom

Local Government, Planning and Land Act 1980 (Note: Section 197.)
- Act of Parliament
- Parliament of the United Kingdom
- Long title: An Act to relax controls over local and certain other authorities; to amend the law relating to the publication of information, the undertaking of works and the payment of allowances by local authorities and other bodies; to make further provision with respect to rates and to grants for local authorities and other persons and for controlling the expenditure of local authorities; to amend the law relating to planning; to make provision for a register of public land and the disposal of land on it; to repeal the Community Land Act 1975; to continue the Land Authority for Wales; to make further provision in relation to land compensation, development land, derelict land and public bodies' acquisitions and disposals of land; to amend the law relating to town development and new towns; to provide for the establishment of corporations to regenerate urban areas; to make further provision in relation to gipsies and their caravan sites; to abolish the Clean Air Councils and certain restrictions on the Greater London Council; to empower certain further authorities to confer honorary distinctions; and for connected purposes.
- Citation: 1980 c. 65
- Territorial extent: England and Wales; Scotland; (Note: Section 196.)

Dates
- Royal assent: 13 November 1980
- Commencement: various (Note: Section 47.)
Other legislation
Amends	Town Police Clauses Act 1847; Commons Act 1876; Land Settlement (Facilities) Act 1919; Prevention of Damage by Pests Act 1949; Town Development Act 1952; Rent Act 1977; Refuse Disposal (Amenity) Act 1978
Repeals/revokes	General Rate Act 1975; Community Land Act 1975
Amended by	Highways Act 1980; New Towns Act 1981; Compulsory Purchase (Vesting Declarations) Act 1981; Acquisition of Land Act 1981; Litter Act 1983; Road Traffic Regulation Act 1984; Food Act 1984; Rates Act 1984; Rent (Scotland) Act 1984; Housing (Consequential Provisions) Act 1985; Weights and Measures Act 1985; Airports Act 1986; Coal Industry Act 1987; British Steel Act 1988; Statute Law (Repeals) Act 1989; Planning (Consequential Provisions) Act 1990; Water Consolidation (Consequential Provisions) Act 1991; Clean Air Act 1993; Statute Law (Repeals) Act 1993; Coal Industry Act 1994; Education Act 1996; Planning (Consequential Provisions) (Scotland) Act 1997; Scottish Public Services Ombudsman Act 2002; Statute Law (Repeals) Act 2004; Government of Wales Act 2006; Statute Law (Repeals) Act 2008; Postal Services Act 2011; Policing and Crime Act 2017; Planning and Infrastructure Act 2025

Status: Amended

Text of statute as originally enacted

Revised text of statute as amended

Text of the Local Government, Planning and Land Act 1980 as in force today (including any amendments) within the United Kingdom, from legislation.gov.uk.

The Local Government, Planning and Land Act 1980 (c. 65) is an act of the Parliament of the United Kingdom that imposed tendering requirements on local authorities in relation to works contracts and was responsible for the establishment of development corporations, including the London Docklands Development Corporation.

The act also created the Public Request to Order Disposal, which can be used by the government to force a local authority to sell derelict land and empty property owned by certain public landlords. The power was renamed the Community Right to Reclaim Land in 2011.

== See also ==
- Direct service organisation
