= Direct service organisation =

A direct service organisation or direct labour organisation (DSO or DLO) is a business unit of a United Kingdom local authority or social landlord (housing association) which undertakes work specified by the Local Government Act 1988 and Local Government, Planning and Land Act 1980 and/or other work, including construction and building maintenance. Its workers are directly employed by the authority or landlord.

== Local government services ==
Compulsory competitive tendering (CCT) and deregulation were encouraged in the UK in the early 1980s, leading to the formal establishment of DSOs (and their forerunner, DLOs) within many local authorities. Where DLOs and DSOs were established for CCT purposes and the DLO or DSO "won" Council business via a competitive tender, their operation and performance would generally be monitored by the "client" side of the local authority, just as the performance of a private company operating under a contract would be monitored, although 1997 research undertaken on behalf of the UK government observed that client-side monitoring arrangements were "very variable in terms of methods and approaches". About a quarter of local authorities monitored their DSOs using an output-based specification, meaning they focused on the service's result, such as the cleanliness achieved or the timeliness of refuse collection, rather than the organisation and resource planning of the DLO or DSO.

Under local government CCT, DSOs won a majority of the tenders they bid for, with DSOs winning up to 84% of tenders in London boroughs, up to 83% in metropolitan authorities and up to 75% in counties and districts elsewhere in England and Wales. DSOs providing catering services in schools were the most successful in winning business, while DSOs providing refuse collection services were the least successful type of DSO.

A local authority cannot "contract" with itself, and therefore an agreement between a DLO or DSO and its "client" department within the same authority cannot be treated as a contract; however, Regulation 20(8) of the Public Works Contracts Regulations 1991 stated that

For the purposes of this regulation [8], an "offer" includes a bid by one part of a contracting authority to carry out work or works for another part of the contracting authority when the former part is invited by the latter part to compete with the offers sought from other persons.

and therefore such an "offer" could be directly compared with an independent contractor's offer. Substantially the same wording, referring both to works, supplies and services, was included in the Public Contracts Regulations 2006, but was removed when the regulations were updated in 2015.

== Social housing ==
50% of UK social landlords in 2013 operated a direct labour organisation for property repairs and maintenance. By 2023 this proportion had risen to 61%.
