= Planning and Compensation Act 1991 =

Act of the Parliament of the United Kingdom

Planning and Compensation Act 1991 (Note: Section 84(1).)
- Act of Parliament
- Parliament of the United Kingdom
- Long title: An Act to amend the law relating to town and country planning; to extend the powers to acquire by agreement land which may be affected by carrying out public works; to amend the law relating to compulsory acquisition of land and to compensation where persons are displaced from land or the value of land or its enjoyment may be affected by public works; to provide, in the case of compensation payable in respect of things done in the exercise of statutory powers, for advance payments and payments in interest; and to repeal Part X of the Highways Act 1980
- Citation: 1991 c. 34
- Territorial extent: England and Wales; Scotland; Northern Ireland (sections 82 and 83); (Note: Section 84(6)–(9).)

Dates
- Royal assent: 25 July 1991
- Commencement: various (Note: Section 84(2)–(4).)
Other legislation
Amends	Land Compensation Act 1961; Highways Act 1980; National Heritage Act 1983; Airports Act 1986; Town and Country Planning Act 1990; Planning (Consequential Provisions) Act 1990
Amended by	Water Consolidation (Consequential Provisions) Act 1991; Planning (Consequential Provisions) (Scotland) Act 1997; Town and Country Planning (Environmental Impact Assessment) (England and Wales) Regulations 1999; Planning and Compulsory Purchase Act 2004

Status: Amended

Records of Parliamentary debate relating to the statute from Hansard

Text of statute as originally enacted

Revised text of statute as amended

Text of the Planning and Compensation Act 1991 as in force today (including any amendments) within the United Kingdom, from legislation.gov.uk.

The Planning and Compensation Act 1991 (c. 34) is an act of the Parliament of the United Kingdom to amend the law relating to town and country planning.

It was intended to extend the powers to acquire by agreement land which may be affected by carrying out public works, to amend the law relating to compulsory acquisition of land and to compensation where persons are displaced from land or the value of land or its enjoyment may be affected by public works, to provide, in the case of compensation payable in respect of things done in the exercise of statutory powers, for advance payments and payments in interest, and to repeal part X of the Highways Act 1980.

== Background ==
The act was intended to implement recommendations derived from a report by Mr Robert Carnwath QC for HMSO and proposals from a consultation which was published by the Department of the Environment in July 1989.

== Planning provisions ==
The act created two new procedures for a local planning authority to enforce breaches of planning permission in sections 1 and 2. A planning contravention notice is used if the authority suspects that there has been a breach but it either wishes to discuss the potential breach with the owner or occupier or does not have enough evidence to proceed. It can require information about the operations and uses of the property as related to the planning conditions. If the owner gives false information or fails to comply within 21 days, a criminal offence is committed.

A breach of condition notice provides a remedy for breaches of condition without impeding the power of the authority to issue an enforcement notice or an injunction. The property owner cannot appeal this notice and can face criminal charges for non-compliance.

The new power in section 3 to apply to the High Court or County Court for an injunction in the case of a breach of planning control extends the power in section 222 of the Local Government Act 1972.

== Compensation provisions ==
Section 31 of the act repealed the Unexpended Balance of Development Value Rules.
