= List of acts of the Parliament of the United Kingdom from 1980 =

This is a list of acts of the Parliament of the United Kingdom passed in 1980.

Acts passed since 1963 are cited by calendar year, as opposed to the convention used for earlier acts of citing the regnal year(s) in which the relevant parliamentary session was held. Each act passed in a respective year is given a chapter number (abbreviated "c."), denoted by Arabic numerals in the case of public general acts, lowercase Roman numerals in the case of local acts, or italicised Arabic numerals in the case of personal acts. These run as separate series.

112 acts of Parliament were passed in 1980: 68 public general acts, 43 local acts and 1 personal act.

indicates that an act has been transcribed on Wikisource, indicates that an act is available to view at legislation.gov.uk, and indicates the location of the original act in the Parliamentary Archives.

== Public general acts ==
Short title	Citation	Royal assent
Long title
Petroleum Revenue Tax Act 1980	1980 c. 1	31 January 1980
An Act to make new provision in respect of petroleum revenue tax so as to require payments on account of tax to be made in advance of the making of an assessment, to bring forward the date from which interest is payable on unpaid and overpaid tax and to provide for altering the rate at which such interest is payable.
Papua New Guinea, Western Samoa and Nauru (Miscellaneous Provisions) Act 1980	1980 c. 2	31 January 1980
An Act to make provision in connection with the attainment by Papua New Guinea of independence within the Commonwealth and with the membership of the Commonwealth of Western Samoa and Nauru.
Representation of the People Act 1980 (repealed)	1980 c. 3	31 January 1980
An Act to make further provision with respect to the registration for electoral purposes of persons having a service qualification and the correction of registers of electors; and for purposes connected with those matters. (Repealed by Representation of the People Act 1983 (c. 2))
Bail etc. (Scotland) Act 1980 (repealed)	1980 c. 4	31 January 1980
An Act to amend the law of Scotland relating to bail and the interim liberation of persons who have been arrested and to make provision in respect of the sittings of the sheriff and district courts. (Repealed by Criminal Procedure (Consequential Provisions) (Scotland) Act 1995 (c. 40))
Child Care Act 1980 (repealed)	1980 c. 5	31 January 1980
An Act to consolidate certain enactments relating to the care of children by local authorities or voluntary organisations and certain other enactments relating to the care of children. (Repealed by Children Act 1989 (c. 41))
Foster Children Act 1980 (repealed)	1980 c. 6	31 January 1980
An Act to consolidate certain enactments relating to foster children as they have effect in England and Wales. (Repealed by Children Act 1989 (c. 41))
Residential Homes Act 1980	1980 c. 7	20 March 1980
An Act to consolidate certain enactments relating to the registration, inspection and conduct of residential homes for disabled, old or mentally disordered persons and to the provision by district councils of meals and recreation for old people.
Gaming (Amendment) Act 1980 (repealed)	1980 c. 8	20 March 1980
An Act to amend subsection (3) of section 20 of the Gaming Act 1968 (Note: Gaming Act 1968 (c. 65)) to enable the Secretary of State, by order, to amend the limit of £1,000 therein. (Repealed by Gambling Act 2005 (c. 19))
Reserve Forces Act 1980	1980 c. 9	20 March 1980
An Act to consolidate certain enactments relating to the reserve and auxiliary forces, and the lieutenancies, with amendments to give effect to a recommendation of the Law Commission; and to repeal certain obsolete enactments relating to those forces.
Police Negotiating Board Act 1980 (repealed)	1980 c. 10	20 March 1980
An Act to provide for a Police Negotiating Board for the United Kingdom in place of the Police Council for the United Kingdom. (Repealed by Police Act 1996 (c. 16))
Protection of Trading Interests Act 1980	1980 c. 11	20 March 1980
An Act to provide protection from requirements, prohibitions and judgments imposed or given under the laws of countries outside the United Kingdom and affecting the trading or other interests of persons in the United Kingdom.
Bees Act 1980	1980 c. 12	20 March 1980
An Act to make new provision for the control of pests and diseases affecting bees.
Slaughter of Animals (Scotland) Act 1980	1980 c. 13	20 March 1980
An Act to consolidate certain enactments relating to slaughterhouses, knackers' yards and the slaughter of animals in Scotland.
Consolidated Fund Act 1980	1980 c. 14	20 March 1980
An Act to apply certain sums out of the Consolidated Fund to the service of the years ending on 31st March 1979 and 1980.
National Health Service (Invalid Direction) Act 1980 (repealed)	1980 c. 15	20 March 1980
An Act to give temporary effect to an instrument purporting to be a direction given by the Secretary of State for Social Services. (Repealed by Statute Law (Repeals) Act 1986 (c. 12))
New Hebrides Act 1980	1980 c. 16	20 March 1980
An Act to make provision in connection with the attainment by the New Hebrides of independence within the Commonwealth.
National Heritage Act 1980	1980 c. 17	31 March 1980
An Act to establish a National Heritage Memorial Fund for providing financial assistance for the acquisition, maintenance and preservation of land, buildings and objects of outstanding historic and other interest; to make new provision in relation to the arrangements for accepting property in satisfaction of capital transfer tax and estate duty; to provide for payments out of public funds in respect of the loss of or damage to objects loaned to or displayed in local museums and other institutions; and for purposes connected with those matters.
Betting, Gaming and Lotteries (Amendment) Act 1980	1980 c. 18	31 March 1980
An Act to amend the provisions of the Betting, Gaming and Lotteries Acts 1963 to 1971 in relation to the number of races on which betting may take place on dog racecourses on any day and in relation to the number of special betting days.
Highlands and Islands Air Services (Scotland) Act 1980	1980 c. 19	3 April 1980
An Act to make further provision for assistance by way of grants or loans in connection with air services serving the Highlands and Islands, and for connected purposes.
Education Act 1980	1980 c. 20	3 April 1980
An Act to amend the law relating to education.
Competition Act 1980	1980 c. 21	3 April 1980
An Act to abolish the Price Commission; to make provision for the control of anti-competitive practices in the supply and acquisition of goods and the supply and securing of services; to provide for references of certain public bodies and other persons to the Monopolies and Mergers Commission; to provide for the investigation of prices and charges by the Director General of Fair Trading; to provide for the making of grants to certain bodies; to amend and provide for the amendment of the Fair Trading Act 1973; (Note: Fair Trading Act 1973 (c. 41)) to make amendments with respect to the Restrictive Trade Practices Act 1976; (Note: Restrictive Trade Practices Act 1976 (c. 34)) to repeal the remaining provisions of the Counter-Inflation Act 1973; (Note: Counter-Inflation Act 1973 (c. 9)) and for purposes connected therewith.
Companies Act 1980 (repealed)	1980 c. 22	1 May 1980
An Act to amend the law relating to companies. (Repealed by Companies Consolidation (Consequential Provisions) Act 1985 (c. 9))
Consular Fees Act 1980	1980 c. 23	1 May 1980
An Act to re-enact with amendments so much of the Consular Salaries and Fees Act 1891 (Note: Consular Salaries and Fees Act 1891 (54 & 55 Vict. c. 36)) as relates to consular fees together with certain enactments amending that Act.
Limitation Amendment Act 1980	1980 c. 24	1 May 1980
An Act to amend the law with respect to the limitation of actions and arbitrations and with respect to the liability of a debtor who becomes his creditor's executor by representation or administrator.
Insurance Companies Act 1980	1980 c. 25	1 May 1980
An Act to extend the Insurance Companies Act 1974 (Note: Insurance Companies Act 1974 (c. 49)) to Northern Ireland, to amend that Act with respect to the functions of the Industrial Assurance Commissioner, and for connected purposes.
British Aerospace Act 1980	1980 c. 26	1 May 1980
An Act to provide for the vesting of all the property, rights, liabilities and obligations of British Aerospace in a company nominated by the Secretary of State and the subsequent dissolution of British Aerospace; and to make provision with respect to the finances of that company.
Import of Live Fish (England and Wales) Act 1980	1980 c. 27	15 May 1980
An Act to restrict in England and Wales the import, keeping or release of live fish or shellfish or the live eggs or milt of fish or shellfish of certain species.
Iran (Temporary Powers) Act 1980 (repealed)	1980 c. 28	15 May 1980
An Act to enable provision to be made in consequence of breaches of international law by Iran in connection with or arising out of the detention of members of the embassy of the United States of America. (Repealed by Statute Law (Repeals) Act 1989 (c. 43))
Concessionary Travel For Handicapped Persons (Scotland) Act 1980	1980 c. 29	23 May 1980
An Act to enable local authorities in Scotland to provide concessionary travel schemes for handicapped persons; and for connected purposes.
Social Security Act 1980	1980 c. 30	23 May 1980
An Act to amend the law relating to social security and the Pensions Appeal Tribunals Act 1943. (Note: Pensions Appeal Tribunals Act 1943 (6 & 7 Geo. 6. c. 39))
Port of London (Financial Assistance) Act 1980	1980 c. 31	30 June 1980
An Act to provide financial assistance for and in connection with measures taken by the Port of London Authority to restore the profitability of their undertaking by reducing the number of persons employed by them.
Licensed Premises (Exclusion of Certain Persons) Act 1980	1980 c. 32	30 June 1980
An Act to empower the courts to make orders excluding certain categories of convicted persons from licensed premises.
Industry Act 1980	1980 c. 33	30 June 1980
An Act to make further provision in relation to the National Enterprise Board, the Scottish Development Agency, the Welsh Development Agency and the English Industrial Estates Corporation; to authorise the Secretary of State to acquire securities of, make loans to and provide guarantees for companies in which he acquires shares from the National Enterprise Board; to amend the Industry Act 1972 (Note: Industry Act 1972 (c. 63)) and the Industry Act 1975; (Note: Industry Act 1975 (c. 68)) to authorise the provision by the Secretary of State of an advisory service; to remove the requirement for a register of the financial interests of members of British Shipbuilders; and for connected purposes.
Transport Act 1980	1980 c. 34	30 June 1980
An Act to amend the law relating to public service vehicles; to make provision for and in connection with the transfer of the undertaking of the National Freight Corporation to a company; to provide for the making of payments by the Minister of Transport in aid of certain railway and other pension schemes; to amend Part VI of the Road Traffic Act 1972 (Note: Road Traffic Act 1972 (c. 20)) as regards car-sharing arrangements; to make amendments about articulated vehicles; to prohibit the display of certain roof-signs on vehicles other than taxis; to abolish the Freight Integration Council and the Railways and Coastal Shipping Committee; to repeal certain provisions about special authorisations for the use of large goods vehicles and about charges on independent tramways, trolley vehicles and the like; and for connected purposes.
Sea Fish Industry Act 1980	1980 c. 35	30 June 1980
An Act to enable the White Fish Authority to impose a levy in respect of white fish and white fish products trans-shipped within British fishery limits.
New Towns Act 1980 (repealed)	1980 c. 36	30 June 1980
An Act to increase the limit imposed by section 43 of the New Towns Act 1965 (Note: New Towns Act 1965 (c. 59)) on the amounts which may be borrowed by development corporations and the Commission for the New Towns. (Repealed by New Towns Act 1981 (c. 64))
Gas Act 1980	1980 c. 37	30 June 1980
An Act to provide that the supply of gas to any premises at an annual rate in excess of 25,000 therms shall be subject to the special agreement of the British Gas Corporation and that charges for therms supplied to any premises in excess of 25,000 therms a year may be fixed by the Corporation under section 25(3) of the Gas Act 1972 (Note: Gas Act 1972 (c. 60)) without regard to the requirements of section 24(1) or 25(5) of that Act.
Coroners Act 1980 (repealed)	1980 c. 38	17 July 1980
An Act to abolish the obligation of coroners under the law of England and Wales to view the bodies on which they hold inquests; to make fresh provision for inquests to be held in districts other than that in which the body lies; to confer new powers for the exhumation of bodies; and for connected purposes. (Repealed by Coroners Act 1988 (c. 13))
Social Security (No. 2) Act 1980 (repealed)	1980 c. 39	17 July 1980
An Act to amend the law relating to social security for the purpose of reducing or abolishing certain benefits and of relaxing or abolishing certain duties to increase sums. (Repealed by Social Security (Consequential Provisions) Act 1992 (c. 6))
Licensing (Amendment) Act 1980 (repealed)	1980 c. 40	17 July 1980
An Act to amend the Licensing Act 1964 (Note: Licensing Act 1964 (c. 26)) in relation to special hours certificates and the extension of existing on-licences to additional types of liquor. (Repealed by Licensing Act 2003 (c. 17))
Films Act 1980 (repealed)	1980 c. 41	17 July 1980
An Act to amend the enactments relating to the financing and exhibition of films. (Repealed by Films Act 1985 (c. 21))
Employment Act 1980	1980 c. 42	1 August 1980
An Act to provide for payments out of public funds towards trade unions' expenditure in respect of ballots, for the use of employers' premises in connection with ballots, and for the issue by the Secretary of State of Codes of Practice for the improvement of industrial relations; to make provision in respect of exclusion or expulsion from trade unions and otherwise to amend the law relating to workers, employers, trade unions and employers' associations; to repeal section 1A of the Trade Union and Labour Relations Act 1974; (Note: Trade Union and Labour Relations Act 1974 (c. 52)) and for connected purposes.
Magistrates' Courts Act 1980	1980 c. 43	1 August 1980
An Act to consolidate certain enactments relating to the jurisdiction of, and the practice and procedure before, magistrates' courts and the functions of justices' clerks, and to matters connected therewith, with amendments to give effect to recommendations of the Law Commission.
Education (Scotland) Act 1980	1980 c. 44	1 August 1980
An Act to consolidate certain enactments relating to education in Scotland with amendments to give effect to recommendations of the Scottish Law Commission.
Water (Scotland) Act 1980	1980 c. 45	1 August 1980
An Act to consolidate the enactments relating to water in Scotland.
Solicitors (Scotland) Act 1980	1980 c. 46	1 August 1980
An Act to consolidate certain enactments relating to solicitors and notaries public in Scotland.
Criminal Appeal (Northern Ireland) Act 1980	1980 c. 47	1 August 1980
An Act to consolidate the Criminal Appeal (Northern Ireland) Act 1968 (Note: Criminal Appeal (Northern Ireland) Act 1968 (c. 21)) and related enactments.
Finance Act 1980	1980 c. 48	1 August 1980
An Act to grant certain duties, to alter other duties, and to amend the law relating to the National Debt and the Public Revenue, and to make further provision in connection with Finance.
Deer Act 1980 (repealed)	1980 c. 49	8 August 1980
An Act to prevent the poaching of deer; to control the sale and purchase of venison; to amend the Deer Act 1963; (Note: Deer Act 1963 (c. 36)) and for purposes connected therewith. (Repealed by Deer Act 1991 (c. 54))
Coal Industry Act 1980	1980 c. 50	8 August 1980
An Act to increase the limit on the borrowing powers of the National Coal Board and otherwise to amend the law with respect to loans to the Board; to make new provision for grants by the Secretary of State to the Board and to provide a new limit for those grants and for grants to the Board and other persons under certain existing powers; to amend the Coal Industry Act 1977; (Note: Coal Industry Act 1977 (c. 39)) and to increase the limit on grants by the Secretary of State to the Board under section 1 of the Coal Industry Act 1975. (Note: Coal Industry Act 1975 (c. 56))
Housing Act 1980	1980 c. 51	8 August 1980
An Act to give security of tenure, and the right to buy their homes, to tenants of local authorities and other bodies; to make other provision with respect to those and other tenants; to amend the law about housing finance in the public sector; to make other provision with respect to housing; to restrict the discretion of the court in making orders for possession of land; and for connected purposes.
Tenants' Rights, Etc. (Scotland) Act 1980	1980 c. 52	8 August 1980
An Act to make provision for Scotland, in relation to dwelling-houses let by islands and district councils and by certain other bodies, for a tenant's right to purchase the dwelling-house which he occupies; to make provision, in relation to dwelling-houses let by islands and district councils and by certain other bodies, for a tenant's right to security of tenure and to a written lease; in relation to private sector tenancies, to make provision for a new category of short tenancies; and to make other provision in relation to housing, rents and connected matters.
Health Services Act 1980	1980 c. 53	8 August 1980
An Act to make further provision with respect to the health services in England, Wales and Scotland and their use by private patients and with respect to hospitals and nursing homes outside those services; to dissolve or make further provision with respect to certain bodies connected with or with persons providing services within those health services; and for connected purposes.
Appropriation Act 1980	1980 c. 54	8 August 1980
An Act to apply a sum out of the Consolidated Fund to the service of the year ending on 31st March 1981, to appropriate the further supplies granted in this Session of Parliament, and to repeal certain Consolidated Fund and Appropriation Acts.
Law Reform (Miscellaneous Provisions) (Scotland) Act 1980	1980 c. 55	29 October 1980
An Act to make new provision for Scotland as respects the law relating to the qualification of jurors; to amend the law relating to jury service in Scotland; to make further provision for Scotland in respect of prior rights in the estates of deceased persons; to dispense with caution as regards certain executors-dative; to provide a procedure whereby an heir of provision may establish entitlement to act as trustee; to amend provisions of the Judicial Factors Act 1849 (Note: Judicial Factors Act 1849 (12 & 13 Vict. c. 51)) and the Trusts (Scotland) Act 1961 (Note: Trusts (Scotland) Act 1961 (9 & 10 Eliz. 2. c. 57)) relating to the actings of judicial factors; to remove an obligation to preserve inventories of the estates of deceased persons in Scotland; to make further provision in respect of performance of the duties of sheriff principal; to amend the law relating to the jurisdiction and powers of the sheriff court; to empower Senators of the College of Justice to act as arbiters and oversmen in commercial disputes; to make further provision in respect of awards of compensation by the Lands Tribunal for Scotland; to remove the right of a vexatious litigant to appeal against a Lord Ordinary's refusal to allow the institution of legal proceedings; to amend the law relating to the jurisdiction of the Court of Session in actions for reduction; to amend the provisions of the Licensing (Scotland) Act 1976 (Note: Licensing (Scotland) Act 1976 (c. 66)) relating to liability for offences committed by clubs; to amend provisions of the Marriage (Scotland) Act 1977 (Note: Marriage (Scotland) Act 1977 (c. 15)) relating to the validity of marriages; to amend the provisions of the Prescription and Limitation (Scotland) Act 1973 (Note: Prescription and Limitation (Scotland) Act 1973 (c. 52)) relating to limitation of actions; to amend the law relating to the constitution and powers of the Scottish Solicitors' Discipline Tribunal; to make further provision as regards Scottish solicitors' clients' accounts; to enable amendments to be made to provisions of the Legal Aid (Scotland) Act 1967 (Note: Legal Aid (Scotland) Act 1967 (c. 43)) relating to contributions from assisted persons; to make minor amendments to the Betting, Gaming and Lotteries Act 1963, (Note: Betting, Gaming and Lotteries Act 1963 (c. 2)) the Lotteries and Amusements Act 1976 (Note: Lotteries and Amusements Act 1976 (c. 32)) and the Licensing (Scotland) Act 1976; and for connected purposes.
Married Women's Policies of Assurance (Scotland) (Amendment) Act 1980	1980 c. 56	29 October 1980
An Act to amend the Married Women's Policies of Assurance (Scotland) Act 1880, (Note: Married Women's Policies of Assurance (Scotland) Act 1880 (43 & 44 Vict. c. 26)) and for connected purposes.
Imprisonment (Temporary Provisions) Act 1980	1980 c. 57	29 October 1980
An Act to make provision with respect to the detention of persons who may lawfully be detained in penal institutions in England and Wales and the release from custody of such persons; to make provision for reducing the numbers committed to such institutions; to modify the law relating to remands; and for connected purposes.
Limitation Act 1980	1980 c. 58	13 November 1980
An Act to consolidate the Limitation Acts 1939 to 1980.
Statute Law Revision (Northern Ireland) Act 1980 (repealed)	1980 c. 59	13 November 1980
An Act to revise the statute law of Northern Ireland by repealing obsolete, spent, unnecessary or superseded enactments. (Repealed by Statute Law (Repeals) Act 1998 (c. 43))
Civil Aviation Act 1980	1980 c. 60	13 November 1980
An Act to provide for the reduction of the public dividend capital of the British Airways Board and otherwise to make provision in relation to the finances of the Board; to provide for the subsequent dissolution of the Board and the vesting of all its property, rights, liabilities and obligations in a company nominated by the Secretary of State; to make provision with respect to the finances of that company; to amend the Civil Aviation Act 1971; (Note: Civil Aviation Act 1971 (c. 75)) to amend section 4 of the Civil Aviation (Eurocontrol) Act 1962; (Note: Civil Aviation (Eurocontrol) Act 1962 (10 & 11 Eliz. 2. c. 8)) to require soundproofing grants to be taken into account in determining compensation for depreciation due to the use of aerodromes; to make further provision with respect to the investigation of accidents arising out of or in the course of air navigation; to amend the Protection of Aircraft Act 1973; (Note: Protection of Aircraft Act 1973 (c. 47)) to extend the powers of the British Airports Authority in relation to aerodromes outside Great Britain and clarify its powers in certain other respects; to enable that Authority to acquire certain land by agreement; and to enable the owners and managers of certain aerodromes to make byelaws in relation to lost property found at those aerodromes.
Tenants' Rights, Etc. (Scotland) Amendment Act 1980	1980 c. 61	13 November 1980
An Act to provide for authorisation by the Secretary of State of refusal to sell certain dwelling-houses, provided for elderly persons, under the Tenants' Rights, Etc. (Scotland) Act 1980; (Note: Tenants' Rights, Etc. (Scotland) Act 1980 (c. 52)) and to make minor amendments to that Act. (Repealed by Housing (Scotland) Act 1987 (c. 26))
Criminal Justice (Scotland) Act 1980	1980 c. 62	13 November 1980
An Act to make further provision as regards criminal justice in Scotland; and for connected purposes.
Overseas Development and Co-operation Act 1980 (repealed)	1980 c. 63	13 November 1980
An Act to consolidate certain enactments relating to overseas development and co-operation and to repeal, as unnecessary, section 16(1) and (2) of the West Indies Act 1967. (Note: West Indies Act 1967 (c. 4)) (Repealed by International Development Act 2002 (c. 1))
Broadcasting Act 1980	1980 c. 64	13 November 1980
An Act to amend and supplement the Independent Broadcasting Authority Act 1973 (Note: Independent Broadcasting Authority Act 1973 (c. 19)) in connection with the provision by the Independent Broadcasting Authority of a second television service and otherwise in connection with the functions of the Authority; to make provision as to the arrangements for the broadcasting of television programmes for reception in Wales, with power to make different provision as to those arrangements by order; to establish a Broadcasting Complaints Commission; and for connected purposes.
Local Government, Planning and Land Act 1980	1980 c. 65	13 November 1980
An Act to relax controls over local and certain other authorities; to amend the law relating to the publication of information, the undertaking of works and the payment of allowances by local authorities and other bodies; to make further provision with respect to rates and to grants for local authorities and other persons and for controlling the expenditure of local authorities; to amend the law relating to planning; to make provision for a register of public land and the disposal of land on it; to repeal the Community Land Act 1975; (Note: Community Land Act 1975 (c. 77)) to continue the Land Authority for Wales; to make further provision in relation to land compensation, development land, derelict land and public bodies' acquisitions and disposals of land; to amend the law relating to town development and new towns; to provide for the establishment of corporations to regenerate urban areas; to make further provision in relation to gipsies and their caravan sites; to abolish the Clean Air Councils and certain restrictions on the Greater London Council; to empower certain further authorities to confer honorary distinctions; and for connected purposes.
Highways Act 1980	1980 c. 66	13 November 1980
An Act to consolidate the Highways Acts 1959 to 1971 and related enactments, with amendments to give effect to recommendations of the Law Commission.
Anguilla Act 1980	1980 c. 67	16 December 1980
An Act to make further provision with respect to Anguilla.
Consolidated Fund (No. 2) Act 1980	1980 c. 68	18 December 1980
An Act to apply certain sums out of the Consolidated Fund to the service of the years ending on 31st March 1981 and 1982.

== Local acts ==
Short title	Citation	Royal assent
Long title
Ardveenish Harbour Order Confirmation Act 1980	1980 c. i	31 January 1980
An Act to confirm a Provisional Order under the Private Legislation Procedure (Scotland) Act 1936, (Note: Private Legislation Procedure (Scotland) Act 1936 (26 Geo. 5 & 1 Edw. 8. c. 52)) relating to Ardveenish Harbour.
	Ardveenish Harbour Order 1980 Provisional Order to authorise the Highlands and Islands Development Board to construct works at Ardveenish in the island of Barra in the Western Isles; to establish the Board as a harbour authority in respect of the harbour at Ardveenish; to provide for harbour limits and authorise the exercise of harbour jurisdiction; and for other purposes.	
Forth Ports Authority Order Confirmation Act 1980	1980 c. ii	31 January 1980
An Act to confirm a Provisional Order under the Private Legislation Procedure (Scotland) Act 1936, relating to the Forth Ports Authority.
	Forth Ports Authority Order 1980 Provisional Order to confer further powers upon the Forth Ports Authority and their harbourmaster; and for other purposes.	
Forth Ports Authority (No. 2) Order Confirmation Act 1980 (repealed)	1980 c. iii	31 January 1980
An Act to confirm a Provisional Order under the Private Legislation Procedure (Scotland) Act 1936, relating to Forth Ports Authority (No. 2). (Repealed by Forth Ports Authority (Dissolution) Order 1993 (SI 1993/2916))
	Forth Ports Authority (No. 2) Order 1980 Provisional Order to remove a disqualification as to the appointment by the Secretary of State of paid officers or servants of the Forth Ports Authority as members of that Authority.	
Inverness District Council Order Confirmation Act 1980 (repealed)	1980 c. iv	31 January 1980
An Act to confirm a Provisional Order under the Private Legislation Procedure (Scotland) Act 1936, relating to Inverness District Council. (Repealed by Statute Law (Repeals) Act 1995 (c. 44))
	Inverness District Council Order 1980 Provisional Order to confer powers on the Inverness District Council with respect to stray dogs; and for other purposes	
Kirkcaldy District Council Order Confirmation Act 1980 (repealed)	1980 c. v	31 January 1980
An Act to confirm a Provisional Order under the Private Legislation Procedure (Scotland) Act 1936, relating to Kirkcaldy District Council. (Repealed by Statute Law (Repeals) Act 1995 (c. 44))
	Kirkcaldy District Council Order 1980 Provisional Order to confer powers on the Kirkcaldy District Council with respect to stray dogs; and for other purposes.	
Lochaber District Council Order Confirmation Act 1980 (repealed)	1980 c. vi	31 January 1980
An Act to confirm a Provisional Order under the Private Legislation Procedure (Scotland) Act 1936, relating to Lochaber District Council. (Repealed by Statute Law (Repeals) Act 1995 (c. 44))
	Lochaber District Council Order 1980 Provisional Order to confer powers on the Lochaber District Council with respect to stray dogs; and for other purposes.	
Strathkelvin District Council Order Confirmation Act 1980 (repealed)	1980 c. vii	31 January 1980
An Act to confirm a Provisional Order under the Private Legislation Procedure (Scotland) Act 1936, relating to Strathkelvin District Council. (Repealed by Statute Law (Repeals) Act 1995 (c. 44))
	Strathkelvin District Council Order 1980 Provisional Order to confer powers on the Strathkelvin District Council with respect to stray dogs; and for other purposes.	
West Lothian District Council Order Confirmation Act 1980 (repealed)	1980 c. viii	31 January 1980
An Act to confirm a Provisional Order under the Private Legislation Procedure (Scotland) Act 1936, relating to West Lothian District Council. (Repealed by Statute Law (Repeals) Act 1995 (c. 44))
	West Lothian District Council Order 1980 Provisional Order to confer powers on the West Lothian District Council with respect to stray dogs; and for other purposes.	
British Railways Act 1980	1980 c. ix	31 January 1980
An Act to empower the British Railways Board to construct works and to acquire lands; to extend the time for the compulsory purchase of certain lands; to empower the Fishguard and Rosslare Railways and Harbours Company to construct works and to acquire lands; to confer further powers on the Board and the company; and for other purposes.
County of Merseyside Act 1980	1980 c. x	20 March 1980
An Act to re-enact with amendments and to extend certain local statutory provisions in force within the county of Merseyside; to confer further powers on the Merseyside County Council, the Liverpool City Council and the councils of the boroughs of Knowsley, St. Helens, Sefton and Wirral; to make further provision with respect to the local government, improvement and finances of the county and those local authorities; and for other purposes.
West Midlands County Council Act 1980	1980 c. xi	20 March 1980
An Act to re-enact with amendments and to extend certain local enactments in force within the county of West Midlands; to confer further powers upon the West Midlands County Council, the Birmingham City Council, the Coventry City Council, the Borough Council of Dudley, the Sandwell Borough Council, the Solihull Borough Council, the Walsall Borough Council and the Wolverhampton Borough Council; to make further provision in regard to the improvement, health and local government of that county; and for other purposes.
Cane Hill Cemetery Act 1980	1980 c. xii	31 March 1980
An Act to provide for the removal of restrictions attaching to the Cane Hill Cemetery in the London borough of Croydon; to authorise the use thereof for other purposes; and for purposes incidental thereto.
Cheshire County Council Act 1980	1980 c. xiii	3 April 1980
An Act to re-enact with amendments and to extend certain local enactments in force within the county of Cheshire; to confer further powers on the Cheshire County Council and local authorities in the county; to make further provision in regard to the environment, local government, improvement, health and finances of the county and those local authorities; and for other purposes.
West Yorkshire Act 1980	1980 c. xiv	1 May 1980
An Act to re-enact with amendments and to extend certain local enactments in force within the metropolitan county of West Yorkshire; to confer further powers on the West Yorkshire Metropolitan County Council, the City of Bradford Metropolitan Council, the Borough Council of Calderdale, the Council of the Borough of Kirklees, the Leeds City Council and the Council of the City of Wakefield; to make further provision with regard to the environment, local government and improvement of the county; and for other purposes.
Isle of Wight Act 1980	1980 c. xv	15 May 1980
An Act to re-enact with amendments and to extend certain local enactments in force within the county of Isle of Wight; to confer further powers upon the Isle of Wight County Council, the Medina Borough Council and the South Wight Borough Council; to make further provision in regard to the improvement, health and local government of that county; and for other purposes.
British Railways (Castlefield) Act 1980	1980 c. xvi	30 June 1980
An Act to empower the British Railways Board to construct works and to acquire lands in the cities of Manchester and Salford in the metropolitan county of Greater Manchester; to confer further powers on the Board; and for other purposes.
Bangor Market Act 1980	1980 c. xvii	30 June 1980
An Act to confer powers on the Bangor Market Company Limited in relation to the capital and management of their undertaking; to confer further powers on the Company; and for other purposes.
Wesley's Chapel, City Road Act 1980	1980 c. xviii	30 June 1980
An Act to authorise the use of the burial ground of Wesley's Chapel situate in City Road in the London borough of Islington for other purposes.
Pier and Harbour Order (Brighton West Pier) Confirmation Act 1980	1980 c. xix	17 July 1980
An Act to confirm a Provisional Order made by the Minister of Transport under the General Pier and Harbour Act 1861 (Note: General Pier and Harbour Act 1861 (24 & 25 Vict. c. 45)) relating to Brighton West Pier.
	Brighton West Pier Order 1979 (Note: Although passed in 1980, the short title specifies the year 1979.) Provisional Order to confer powers upon The Brighton West Pier Society Limited under the Brighton West Pier Acts and Order 1866 to 1954.	
Greater Manchester Passenger Transport Act 1980	1980 c. xx	17 July 1980
An Act to confer further powers on the Greater Manchester Passenger Transport Executive; and for other purposes.
Friends Meeting House (Reigate) Act 1980	1980 c. xxi	17 July 1980
An Act to provide for the demolition of the Reigate Meeting House of The Religious Society of Friends; to authorise the disposal of the site thereof together with all land and appurtenances held and enjoyed therewith including the site of a disused burial ground; to use for other purposes the said site, lands, appurtenances and burial ground; and for purposes connected therewith.
Clifton Suspension Bridge Act 1980	1980 c. xxii	17 July 1980
An Act to alter the constitution of the Trustees of the Clifton Suspension Bridge Trust; to make provision as to the investment of moneys of the Trust and for the repeal and amendment of certain provisions of the Clifton Suspension Bridge Act 1952; (Note: Clifton Suspension Bridge Act 1952 (15 & 16 Geo. 6 & 1 Eliz. 2. c. xli)) and for other purposes.
British Olivetti Limited Act 1980	1980 c. xxiii	17 July 1980
An Act to make provision for the transfer to England of the registered office of British Olivetti Limited; and for other purposes incidental thereto.
Eagle & Globe Steel Limited Act 1980	1980 c. xxiv	17 July 1980
An Act to make provision for the transfer to the State of New South Wales in the Commonwealth of Australia of the registered office of Eagle & Globe Steel Limited; for the cesser of application to that company of provisions of the Companies Acts 1948 to 1980; and for other purposes incidental thereto.
Yorkshire Woollen District Transport Act 1980	1980 c. xxv	17 July 1980
An Act to release the Yorkshire Woollen District Transport Company Limited from liability to make payments to the councils of the city of Wakefield and the borough of Kirklees under the Yorkshire (Woollen District) Transport Act 1931 (Note: Yorkshire (Woollen District) Transport Act 1931 (21 & 22 Geo. 5. c. lxii)) and the Dewsbury and Ossett Passenger Transport Act 1933; (Note: Dewsbury and Ossett Passenger Transport Act 1933 (23 & 24 Geo. 5. c. xxvi)) and for other purposes.
Standard Life Assurance Company Act 1980 (repealed)	1980 c. xxvi	17 July 1980
An Act to authorise The Standard Life Assurance Company to carry on business in Canada under a French name; and for other purposes. (Repealed by Standard Life Assurance Company Act 1991 (c. iii))
Breasclete Harbour Order Confirmation Act 1980	1980 c. xxvii	1 August 1980
An Act to confirm a Provisional Order under the Private Legislation Procedure (Scotland) Act 1936, relating to Breasclete Harbour.
	Breasclete Harbour Order 1980 Provisional Order to establish the Highlands and Islands Development Board as a harbour authority in respect of the harbour at Breasclete, East Loch Roag, Lewis, in the Western Isles; to provide for harbour limits and authorise the exercise of harbour jurisdiction; and for other purposes.	
British Railways Order Confirmation Act 1980	1980 c. xxviii	1 August 1980
An Act to confirm a Provisional Order under the Private Legislation Procedure (Scotland) Act 1936, relating to British Railways.
	British Railways Order 1980 Provisional Order to amend section 53 of the British Transport Commission Act 1949 (Note: British Transport Commission Act 1949 (12, 13 & 14 Geo. 6. c. xxix)) in its application to Scotland.	
Greater London Council (Money) Act 1980	1980 c. xxix	1 August 1980
An Act to regulate the expenditure on capital account and on lending to other persons by the Greater London Council during the financial period from 1st April 1980 to 30th September 1981; and for other purposes.
Salvation Army Act 1980	1980 c. xxx	1 August 1980
An Act to revise and consolidate the constitution of The Salvation Army; to make further provision respecting The Salvation Army Trustee Company and respecting the investment of funds of The Salvation Army; to repeal or amend certain provisions of the Salvation Army Acts 1931 to 1968 and to revoke certain deeds poll relating to The Salvation Army; and for other purposes.
Falmouth Container Terminal Act 1980	1980 c. xxxi	1 August 1980
An Act to extend the time for the completion of the works authorised by the Falmouth Container Terminal Act 1971; (Note: Falmouth Container Terminal Act 1971 (c. v)) and for connected purposes.
London Transport Act 1980	1980 c. xxxii	1 August 1980
An Act to empower the London Transport Executive to construct works and to acquire lands; to extend the time for the compulsory purchase of certain lands; to confer further powers on the Executive; and for other purposes.
Pier and Harbour Order (Great Yarmouth Wellington Pier) Confirmation Act 1980	1980 c. xxxiii	8 August 1980
An Act to confirm a Provisional Order made by the Minister of Transport under the General Pier and Harbour Act 1861 relating to Great Yarmouth Wellington Pier.
	Great Yarmouth Wellington Pier Order 1980 Provisional Order to authorise the Great Yarmouth Borough Council to lease or sell the undertaking relating to the pier authorised by the Great Yarmouth Wellington Pier Order 1901; to repeal and amend certain enactments relating to that pier and for other purposes.	
Dundee Port Authority Order Confirmation Act 1980	1980 c. xxxiv	8 August 1980
An Act to confirm a Provisional Order under the Private Legislation Procedure (Scotland) Act 1936, relating to Dundee Port Authority.
	Dundee Port Authority Order 1980 Provisional Order to confer further powers on the Dundee Port Authority; and for other purposes.	
Scottish Widows' Fund and Life Assurance Society Act 1980	1980 c. xxxv	8 August 1980
An Act to repeal The Scottish Widows' Fund and Life Assurance Society's Act 1926; (Note: Scottish Widows' Fund and Life Assurance Society's Act 1926 (16 & 17 Geo. 5. c. lxxviii)) to make further provision for the regulation and management of the Society; and for other purposes.
British Transport Docks Act 1980	1980 c. xxxvi	8 August 1980
An Act to extend the time for the compulsory purchase of certain lands by the British Transport Docks Board; to confer further powers on the Board; and for other purposes.
South Yorkshire Act 1980	1980 c. xxxvii	8 August 1980
An Act to re-enact with amendments and to extend certain local enactments in force within the county of South Yorkshire; to confer further powers on the South Yorkshire County Council and local authorities in the county; to make further provision with regard to the environment, local government and improvement of the county; and for other purposes.
Southern Water Authority Act 1980	1980 c. xxxviii	8 August 1980
An Act to dissolve the Commissioners for the Newhaven and Seaford Sea Defence Works and the Shoreham and Lancing Sea Defence Commissioners; to confer further powers on the Southern Water Authority; and for other purposes.
Eastbourne Harbour Act 1980	1980 c. xxxix	8 August 1980
An Act to authorise Eastbourne Harbour Company Limited to construct works; and for other purposes.
Inverclyde District Council Order Confirmation Act 1980	1980 c. xl	29 October 1980
An Act to confirm a Provisional Order under the Private Legislation Procedure (Scotland) Act 1936, relating to Inverclyde District Council.
	Inverclyde District Council Order 1980 Provisional Order to amend certain provisions of the Greenock Corporation Order 1952; to amend certain penalties for offences prescribed by that Order; and for other purposes.	
City of Dundee District Council Order Confirmation Act 1980	1980 c. xli	29 October 1980
An Act to confirm a Provisional Order under the Private Legislation Procedure (Scotland) Act 1936, relating to the City of Dundee District Council.
	City of Dundee District Council Order 1980 Provisional Order to confer powers on the City of Dundee District Council with respect to stray dogs and the supply of refreshments; and for other purposes.	
United Reformed Church Lion Walk Colchester Act 1980	1980 c. xlii	29 October 1980
An Act to authorise The Essex Incorporated Congregational Union to use land comprising the United Reformed Church Lion Walk Colchester for building or otherwise free from restrictions; and for other purposes.
Tyne and Wear Act 1980	1980 c. xliii	13 November 1980
An Act to re-enact with amendments and to extend certain local enactments in force within the county of Tyne and Wear; to confer further powers on the county council of Tyne and Wear and the councils of the city of Newcastle upon Tyne and the boroughs of Gateshead, North Tyneside, South Tyneside and Sunderland; to make further provision in regard to the environment, local government, improvement and finances of the county and those councils; and for other purposes.

== Private and personal acts ==
Short title	Citation	Royal assent
Long title
Edward Berry and Doris Eilleen Ward (Marriage Enabling) Act 1980	1980 c. 1 Pr.	17 July 1980
An Act to enable Edward Berry and Doris Eilleen Ward to be married to each other.

== Sources ==
- The Journals of the House of Commons (PDF). Vol. 236 (May 1979 – November 1980). pp. 3–854 – via parliament.uk.
- "UK Public General Acts from 1980". legislation.gov.uk. The National Archives.
- "UK Local Acts from 1980". legislation.gov.uk. The National Archives.
- "UK Private and Personal Acts from 1980". legislation.gov.uk. The National Archives.

== See also ==
- List of acts of the Parliament of the United Kingdom
