= New Towns acts =

British legislation

The New Towns acts were a series of acts of the Parliament of the United Kingdom to found new settlements or to expand substantially existing ones, to establish Development Corporations to deliver them, and to create a Commission to wind up the Corporations and take over their assets and liabilities. Of these, the more substantive acts were the New Towns Act 1946 and the Town Development Act 1952. "The New Towns Act [1946] was intended to preemptively direct urban growth and infrastructural development into new towns, thereby decentralising population and economic opportunity while inhibiting urban sprawl."

New Towns were developed in three generations.

- The first generation set up in the late 1940s concentrated predominantly on housing development with provision for rail and seldom for cars; eight were in a ring around London.
- The second generation in the early 1960s included a wider mix of uses and used more innovative architecture.
- The third generation towns were larger and tended to be designed around car travel.

By 2002, about 2 million people were housed in the New Towns, in about 500,000 homes.

== Background ==
The 1944 Abercrombie Plan for London proposed eight new towns within 50 miles (80 km) of London for up to 500,000 people from inner London. Similar recommendations were made for other major conurbations including Manchester and Birmingham. The 1945 Attlee Government set up a New Towns Commission to formally consider how best to repair and rebuild urban communities ravaged in World War II.

In 1945, John Reith, 1st Baron Reith was appointed as chair of the New Towns Commission. The commission concluded that there was a need to construct new towns using the instrument of development corporations supported by central government. The New Towns Act 1946 cemented this vision in 1946 and New Towns were born.

=== Reith Commission ===
The Reith Commission recommended that:

- the new town developments should have a population of up to 60,000
- they should be built as far as possible on greenfield sites
- there should be predominantly single family housing at low density
- the homes had to be organised in neighbourhoods around a primary school and nursery schools, a pub and shops selling staple foods
- there should be a balance of housing and jobs

== New Towns Act 1946 ==
New Towns Act 1946 (Note: Section 26(4).)
- Act of Parliament
- Parliament of the United Kingdom
- Long title: An Act to provide for the creation of new towns by means of development corporations, and for purposes connected therewith.
- Citation: 9 & 10 Geo. 6. c. 68
- Territorial extent: England and Wales; Scotland; (Note: Section 26(5).)

Dates
- Royal assent: 1 August 1946
- Commencement: 1 August 1946 (Note: The Acts of Parliament (Commencement) Act 1793.)
- Repealed: England and Wales: 5 September 1965; Scotland: 1 April 1968
Other legislation
Amends	Town and Country Planning Act 1944; Town and Country Planning (Scotland) Act 1945
Amended by	Town and Country Planning Act 1947; Town and Country Planning (Scotland) Act 1947; Housing (Scotland) Act 1950; New Towns Act 1952; New Towns Act 1953; Law Reform (Limitation of Actions, etc.) Act 1954; New Towns Act 1955; New Towns Act 1958; Housing (Financial Provisions) Act 1958; Highways Act 1959; New Towns Act 1959; Charities Act 1960; Land Compensation Act 1961; Statute Law Revision Act 1963; Land Compensation (Scotland) Act 1963; National Loans Act 1968
Repealed by	England and Wales: New Towns Act 1965; Scotland: New Towns (Scotland) Act 1968

Status: Repealed

Text of statute as originally enacted

An Act to provide for the creation of new towns by means of development corporations, and for purposes connected therewith.

The New Towns Act 1946 (9 & 10 Geo. 6. c. 68) was the act that put into law the conclusions of the New Towns Commission. The act authorised the government to designate areas as new towns, passing development control functions to a New Town Development Corporation. Several new towns were created in the years following its passage. The act was replaced by the New Towns Act 1965 and, later, the New Towns Act 1981.

=== New Town development corporations ===
The act set up development corporations which were responsible for the management, design and development of New Towns. These were public corporations financed by the government through Treasury loans. The boards were appointed by central government; importantly, they were given planning and compulsory purchase order powers.

Their first task was to draw up development frameworks for a mix of housing, offices, industrial development, transport infrastructure and open space.

== Town Development Act 1952 ==
Town Development Act 1952 (Note: Section 23(1).)
- Act of Parliament
- Parliament of the United Kingdom
- Long title: An Act to encourage town development in county districts for the relief of congestion or over-population elsewhere, and for related purposes, and to repeal subsection (5) of section nineteen of the Town and Country Planning Act, 1944, and part of subsection (1) of section five of the New Towns Act, 1946.
- Citation: 15 & 16 Geo. 6 & 1 Eliz. 2. c. 54
- Territorial extent: England and Wales (Note: Section 23(4).)

Dates
- Royal assent: 1 August 1952
- Commencement: 1 August 1952
- Repealed
Other legislation
Amended by	Housing (Financial and Miscellaneous Provisions) Act 1946; Statute Law Revision Act 1948; London Government Act 1963; Water Resources Act 1963; New Towns Act 1965; Town and Country Planning Act 1968; Housing Finance Act 1972; Local Government Act 1972; Water Act 1973; Local Government, Planning and Land Act 1980; Acquisition of Land Act 1981; Local Government Act 1985; Water Act 1989; Local Government and Housing Act 1989
Repealed by	Local Government and Housing Act 1989

Status: Repealed

Text of statute as originally enacted

Revised text of statute as amended

Although not formally a "New Towns Act", the Town Development Act 1952 (15 & 16 Geo. 6 & 1 Eliz. 2. c. 54) uses the powers established by the 1946 act to expand existing towns to achieve the same or similar purposes. The introduction to the act gives its purpose: "An Act to encourage town development in county districts for the relief of congestion or over-population elsewhere, and for related purposes, [etc]". It was this act that enabled London County Council to establish its overspill estates as far away as Cornwall and Northamptonshire. By 1973, over 40 new and expanded towns were described in Parliament as "London overspill". The Act, despite being "obscure and almost forgotten", is credited as having a "significant effect upon the pattern of urban development" in the UK.

== New Towns Acts 1952, 1953, 1955, 1958, 1964, 1966 and 1969 ==
New Towns Act 1952 (Note: Section 2.)
- Act of Parliament
- Parliament of the United Kingdom
- Long title: An Act to increase the amount of the advances which may be made under section twelve of the New Towns Act, 1946.
- Citation: 15 & 16 Geo. 6 & 1 Eliz. 2. c. 27
- Territorial extent: United Kingdom

Dates
- Royal assent: 26 June 1952
- Commencement: 26 June 1952
- Repealed: 29 March 1955
Other legislation
Amends	New Towns Act 1946
Repealed by	New Towns Act 1955

Status: Repealed

Text of statute as originally enacted

New Towns Act 1953
- Act of Parliament
- Parliament of the United Kingdom
- Long title: An Act to increase the amount of the advances which may be made to development corporations under section twelve of the New Towns Act, 1946.
- Citation: 1 & 2 Eliz. 2. c. 38
- Territorial extent: United Kingdom

Dates
- Royal assent: 31 July 1953
- Commencement: 31 July 1953
- Repealed: 29 March 1955
Other legislation
Amends	New Towns Act 1946
Repealed by	New Towns Act 1955

Status: Repealed

Text of statute as originally enacted

New Towns Act 1955
- Act of Parliament
- Parliament of the United Kingdom
- Long title: An Act to increase the amount of the advances which may be made to development corporations under section twelve of the New Towns Act, 1946.
- Citation: 3 & 4 Eliz. 2. c. 4
- Territorial extent: United Kingdom

Dates
- Royal assent: 29 March 1955
- Commencement: 29 March 1955
- Repealed: 20 February 1958
Other legislation
Repeals/revokes	New Towns Act 1952; New Towns Act 1953
Repealed by	New Towns Act 1958

Status: Repealed

Text of statute as originally enacted

New Towns Act 1958 (Note: Section 3.)
- Act of Parliament
- Parliament of the United Kingdom
- Long title: An Act to increase the aggregate amount of the advances which may be made to development corporations under subsection (1) of section twelve of the New Towns Act, 1946; and to amend section thirteen of that Act in respect of the reports and accounts to be laid before Parliament.
- Citation: 6 & 7 Eliz. 2. c. 12
- Territorial extent: United Kingdom

Dates
- Royal assent: 20 February 1958
- Commencement: 20 February 1958
- Repealed: England and Wales: 5 September 1965; Scotland: 1 April 1968
Other legislation
Amends	New Towns Act 1946
Amended by	New Towns Act 1959
Repealed by	England and Wales: New Towns Act 1965; Scotland: New Towns (Scotland) Act 1968

Status: Repealed

Text of statute as originally enacted

New Towns Act 1964 (Note: Section 2(1).)
- Act of Parliament
- Parliament of the United Kingdom
- Long title: An Act to make fresh provision respecting the limits on the amount of the advances which may be made to development corporations under section 12(1) of the New Towns Act 1946 and the Commission for the New Towns under section 3(1) of the New Towns Act 1959.
- Citation: 1964 c. 8
- Territorial extent: United Kingdom

Dates
- Royal assent: 27 February 1964
- Commencement: 27 February 1964
- Repealed: England and Wales: 5 September 1965; Scotland: 1 April 1968
Other legislation
Amends	New Towns Act 1946; New Towns Act 1959
Repealed by	England and Wales: New Towns Act 1965; Scotland: New Towns (Scotland) Act 1968

Status: Repealed

Text of statute as originally enacted

New Towns Act 1966 (Note: Section 4(1).)
- Act of Parliament
- Parliament of the United Kingdom
- Long title: An Act to raise the limit on advances imposed by section 43 of the New Towns Act 1965; to amend the Land Compensation Act 1961 and the Land Compensation (Scotland) Act 1963 in connection with extensions made after the commencement of this Act to the areas of new towns; to repeal provisions of section 46 of the New Towns Act 1965 and section 13 of the New Towns Act 1946 relating to certain accounts and reports; and for purposes connected with the matters aforesaid.
- Citation: 1966 c. 44
- Territorial extent: England and Wales; Scotland; (Note: Section 4(2).)

Dates
- Royal assent: 13 December 1966
- Commencement: 13 December 1966
- Repealed: 30 November 1981
Other legislation
Amends	New Towns Act 1946; Land Compensation Act 1961; Land Compensation (Scotland) Act 1963; New Towns Act 1965
Amended by	New Towns (Scotland) Act 1968; New Towns Act 1969; Statute Law (Repeals) Act 1974
Repealed by	New Towns Act 1981

Status: Repealed

Text of statute as originally enacted

New Towns Act 1969
- Act of Parliament
- Parliament of the United Kingdom
- Long title: An Act to raise the limit on advances imposed by section 43 of the New Towns Act 1965, as amended by subsequent enactments.
- Citation: 1969 c. 5
- Territorial extent: England and Wales; Scotland; (Note: Section 2(2).)

Dates
- Royal assent: 6 March 1969
- Commencement: 6 March 1969
- Repealed: 16 December 1971
Other legislation
Amends	New Towns Act 1965; New Towns Act 1966
Repealed by	New Towns Act 1971

Status: Repealed

Text of statute as originally enacted

These were brief acts to increase the maximum borrowings permitted to fund the developments.

== New Towns Act 1959 ==
New Towns Act 1959 (Note: Section 14(1).)
- Act of Parliament
- Parliament of the United Kingdom
- Long title: An Act to make, as respects England and Wales, new provision in place of section fifteen of the New Towns Act, 1946, as to the disposal of the undertakings of development corporations and other matters arising when a development corporation has achieved or substantially achieved the purposes for which it is established; to amend the law relating to development corporations by increasing the limit on the advances which may be made to them under sub section (1) of section twelve of that Act, by providing for housing subsidies to be wholly or partly withheld in respect of dwellings disposed of by them, and by authorising them to make contributions towards the provision of amenities; and for purposes connected with the matters aforesaid.
- Citation: 7 & 8 Eliz. 2. c. 62
- Territorial extent: England and Wales; Scotland (except part I); (Note: Section 14(2)–(3).)

Dates
- Royal assent: 29 July 1959
- Commencement: 29 July 1959
- Repealed: Scotland: 1 April 1968; England and Wales: 30 November 1981
Other legislation
Amends	New Towns Act 1946; New Towns Act 1958; Housing (Financial Provisions) Act 1958
Amended by	Charities Act 1960; New Towns Act 1964; Licensing Act 1964; New Towns (Scotland) Act 1968; Rent Act 1968; House of Commons Disqualification Act 1975; Statute Law (Repeals) Act 1976
Repealed by	Scotland: New Towns (Scotland) Act 1968; England and Wales: House of Commons Disqualification Act 1975 and New Towns Act 1981

Status: Repealed

Text of statute as originally enacted

The New Towns Act 1959 (7 & 8 Eliz. 2. c. 62) established the Commission for New Towns. (Note: Not to be confused with the 1945 New Towns Commission) Under this Act, "the Minister of Housing and Local Government was authorised to set up a Commission on New Towns to take over the functions of the development corporations whose purposes had, in his opinion, been achieved or substantially achieved".

== New Towns Act 1965 ==
The 'New Towns Act 1965 (c. 59) substantially rewrote and consolidated the 1946 act. While continuing the authority to establish further new towns, the act gives the Commission for the New Towns the task of "taking over, holding, managing and turning to account the property previously vested in the development corporation for a new town".

It may startle some political economists to talk of commencing the building of new cities ... planned as cities from their first foundation, and not mere small towns and villages. ... A time will arrive when something of this sort must be done ... England cannot escape from the alternative of new city building.

— T. J. Maslen, 1843

Several new towns were created in the years following passage of this act. Its most immediate use was the designation of Milton Keynes in 1967, which was envisaged to become a "new city" of 250,000 people. The 1965 act replaced the 1946 act and was replaced in turn by the 1981 act.

== New Towns Act (Northern Ireland) 1965 ==
New Towns Act (Northern Ireland) 1965 (Note: Section 49.)
- Act of Parliament
- Parliament of Northern Ireland
- Long title: An Act to make provision for the creation of new towns, for the exercise by new town commissions of certain functions in relation to such towns, for the expansion or development of existing towns, and for purposes related to those matters.
- Citation: 1965 c. 13 (N.I.)
- Territorial extent: Northern Ireland

Dates
- Royal assent: 24 June 1965
- Commencement: 24 June 1965
Other legislation
Amended by	Northern Ireland Assembly Disqualification Act 1975

Status: Amended

Text of the New Towns Act (Northern Ireland) 1965 as in force today (including any amendments) within the United Kingdom, from legislation.gov.uk.

Since most of the acts did not apply to Northern Ireland (and some not to Scotland), an equivalent act, the New Towns Act (Northern Ireland) 1965 (c. 13 (N.I.)), was passed in 1965 by the Parliament of Northern Ireland. Following the act, Craigavon was designated in July 1965.

== New Towns (Scotland) Act 1968 ==
The New Towns (Scotland) Act 1968 (c. 16) established equivalent legal powers in Scotland.

== New Towns Acts 1971, 1975, 1977, 1980, 1982 and 1987 ==
New Towns Act 1971
- Act of Parliament
- Parliament of the United Kingdom
- Long title: An Act to raise the limit on advances imposed by section 43 of the New Towns Act 1965, as amended by subsequent enactments.
- Citation: 1971 c. 81
- Territorial extent: England and Wales; Scotland

Dates
- Royal assent: 16 December 1971
- Commencement: 16 December 1971
- Repealed: 3 July 1975
Other legislation
Amends	New Towns Act 1965; New Towns Act 1969
Repealed by	New Towns Act 1975

Status: Repealed

Text of statute as originally enacted

New Towns Act 1975 (Note: Section 3(1).)
- Act of Parliament
- Parliament of the United Kingdom
- Long title: An Act to raise the limits imposed by the New Towns Act 1965 on the amounts which may be borrowed by the development corporations for new towns and the Commission for the New Towns and make provision for the payment of pensions to chairmen of development corporations and of remuneration and allowances to members of committees conducting business for the Commission.
- Citation: 1975 c. 42
- Territorial extent: England and Wales; Scotland; (Note: Section 3(3).)

Dates
- Royal assent: 3 July 1975
- Commencement: 3 July 1975
- Repealed: 30 November 1981
Other legislation
Amends	New Towns Act 1965; New Towns (Scotland) Act 1968; Statutory Corporations (Financial Provisions) Act 1974
Repeals/revokes	New Towns Act 1971
Repealed by	New Towns Act 1981

Status: Repealed

Text of statute as originally enacted

New Towns Act 1977
- Act of Parliament
- Parliament of the United Kingdom
- Long title: An Act to increase the limit imposed by section 43 of the New Towns Act 1965 on the amounts which may be borrowed by development corporations and the Commission for the New Towns.
- Citation: 1977 c. 23
- Territorial extent: England and Wales; Scotland

Dates
- Royal assent: 22 July 1977
- Commencement: 22 July 1977
- Repealed: 30 November 1981
Other legislation
Amends	New Towns Act 1965
Repealed by	New Towns Act 1981

Status: Repealed

Text of statute as originally enacted

New Towns Act 1980
- Act of Parliament
- Parliament of the United Kingdom
- Long title: An Act to increase the limit imposed by section 43 of the New Towns Act 1965 on the amounts which may be borrowed by development corporations and the Commission for the New Towns.
- Citation: 1980 c. 36
- Territorial extent: England and Wales; Scotland

Dates
- Royal assent: 30 June 1980
- Commencement: 30 June 1980
- Repealed: 30 November 1981
Other legislation
Amends	New Towns Act 1965
Repealed by	New Towns Act 1981

Status: Repealed

Text of statute as originally enacted

New Towns Act 1982
- Act of Parliament
- Parliament of the United Kingdom
- Long title: An Act to increase the limit imposed by section 60 of the New Towns Act 1981 on the amounts which may be borrowed by development corporations and the Commission for the New Towns.
- Citation: 1982 c. 7
- Territorial extent: England and Wales; Scotland

Dates
- Royal assent: 25 February 1982
- Commencement: 25 February 1982
- Repealed: England and Wales: 11 March 1985
Other legislation
Amends	New Towns Act 1981
Repealed by	England and Wales: New Towns and Urban Development Corporations Act 1985

Status: Amended

Text of statute as originally enacted

Text of the New Towns Act 1982 as in force today (including any amendments) within the United Kingdom, from legislation.gov.uk.

Urban Development Corporations (Financial Limits) Act 1987
- Act of Parliament
- Parliament of the United Kingdom
- Long title: An Act to remove the limit on the amount of grants that may be made to urban development corporations and to provide a new limit applicable only to the amounts for the time being outstanding in respect of sums borrowed by them and sums issued by the Treasury in fulfilment of guarantees of their debts.
- Citation: 1987 c. 57
- Territorial extent: England and Wales; Scotland; (Note: Section 2(3).)

Dates
- Royal assent: 17 December 1987
- Commencement: 17 February 1988
- Repealed: 21 July 2008
Other legislation
Amends	Local Government Planning and Land Act 1980; New Towns and Urban Development Corporations Act 1985
Repeals/revokes	Urban Development Corporations (Financial Limits) Order 1983; Urban Development Corporations (Financial Limits) Order 1987
Repealed by	Statute Law (Repeals) Act 2008

Status: Repealed

Text of statute as originally enacted

Revised text of statute as amended

These acts "increase the limit imposed by section 43 of the New Towns Act 1965 on the amounts which may be borrowed by development corporations and the Commission for the New Towns".

== New Towns (Amendment) Act 1976 ==
New Towns (Amendment) Act 1976 (Note: Section 18(1).)
- Act of Parliament
- Parliament of the United Kingdom
- Long title: An Act to provide for the transfer to district councils of the interest of the Commission for the New Towns and development corporations in dwellings and of any associated property, rights, liabilities and obligations; to increase the maximum number of members of development corporations; and for connected purposes.
- Citation: 1976 c. 68
- Territorial extent: England and Wales (Note: Section 18(2).)

Dates
- Royal assent: 15 November 1976
- Commencement: 15 November 1976
- Repealed: 30 November 1981
Other legislation
Amends	New Towns Act 1965
Amended by	Employment Protection (Consolidation) Act 1978
Repealed by	New Towns Act 1981

Status: Repealed

Text of statute as originally enacted

Among other functions, the New Towns (Amendment) Act 1976 (c. 68) provided for "the interest of the Commission for the New Towns and [the] development corporations in dwellings and of any associated property, rights, liabilities and obligations" to be transferred to district councils.

== New Towns (Scotland) Act 1977 ==
New Towns (Scotland) Act 1977 (Note: Section 7(2).)
- Act of Parliament
- Parliament of the United Kingdom
- Long title: An Act to make provision as respects the revocation or variation of orders made under section 1, 2 or 5(1) of the New Towns (Scotland) Act 1968; and for connected purposes.
- Citation: 1977 c. 16
- Territorial extent: Scotland

Dates
- Royal assent: 26 May 1977
- Commencement: 26 May 1977
Other legislation
Amends	Licensing (Scotland) Act 1959; New Towns (Scotland) Act 1968; Pensions (Increase) Act 1971
Amended by	Employment Rights Act 1996
Relates to	New Towns (Scotland) Act 1968

Status: Amended

Text of statute as originally enacted

Text of the New Towns (Scotland) Act 1977 as in force today (including any amendments) within the United Kingdom, from legislation.gov.uk.

The New Towns (Scotland) Act 1977 (c. 16) amended the New Towns (Scotland) Act 1968, notably to include the option to cancel a new town proposal.

== New Towns Act 1981 ==
New Towns Act 1981 (Note: Section 82(1).)
- Act of Parliament
- Parliament of the United Kingdom
- Long title: An Act to consolidate certain enactments relating to new towns and connected matters, being (except for section 43 of the New Towns Act 1965 and sections 126 and 127 of the Local Government, Planning and Land Act 1980 and certain related provisions) enactments which apply only to England and Wales.
- Citation: 1981 c. 64
- Territorial extent: England and Wales; Scotland (in part); Northern Ireland (in part); (Note: Section 82(2)–(3).)

Dates
- Royal assent: 30 October 1981
- Commencement: 30 November 1981 (Note: Section 82(4).)
Other legislation
Amends	See § Repealed enactments
Repeals/revokes	See § Repealed enactments
Amended by	Civil Aviation Act 1982; New Towns and Urban Development Corporations Act 1985; Airports Act 1986; Income and Corporation Taxes Act 1988; Planning (Consequential Provisions) Act 1990; New Towns (Amendment) Act 1994; Employment Tribunals Act 1996; Employment Rights Act 1996; National Health Service (Consequential Provisions) Act 2006; Postal Services Act 2011; Housing and Planning Act 2016; Levelling-up and Regeneration Act 2023; Planning and Infrastructure Act 2025

Status: Amended

Text of statute as originally enacted

Text of the New Towns acts as in force today (including any amendments) within the United Kingdom, from legislation.gov.uk.

The New Towns Act 1981 is an "Act to consolidate certain enactments relating to new towns and connected matters, being (except for section 43 of the New Towns Act 1965 and sections 126 and 127 of the Local Government, Planning and Land Act 1980 and certain related provisions) enactments which apply only to England and Wales."

== New Towns and Urban Development Corporations Act 1985 ==
New Towns and Urban Development Corporations Act 1985 (Note: Section 15(1).)
- Act of Parliament
- Parliament of the United Kingdom
- Long title: An Act to make provision with respect to certain matters connected with new towns; to amend paragraph 8(1) of Schedule 31 to the Local Government, Planning and Land Act 1980; and for connected purposes.
- Citation: 1985 c. 5
- Territorial extent: England and Wales; Scotland (in part); (Note: Section 15(3).)

Dates
- Royal assent: 11 March 1985
- Commencement: 11 May 1985 (Note: Section 15(2).)
Other legislation
Amends	New Towns (Scotland) Act 1968; Local Government Planning and Land Act 1980; New Towns Act 1981
Repeals/revokes	New Towns Act 1982
Amended by	Urban Development Corporations (Financial Limits) Act 1987; Local Government and Housing Act 1989; Government of Wales Act 1998; Housing and Regeneration Act 2008

Status: Amended

Text of statute as originally enacted

Text of the New Towns and Urban Development Corporations Act 1985 as in force today (including any amendments) within the United Kingdom, from legislation.gov.uk.

== Enterprise and New Towns (Scotland) Act 1990 ==
Enterprise and New Towns (Scotland) Act 1990 (Note: Section 40(1)(a).)
- Act of Parliament
- Parliament of the United Kingdom
- Long title: An Act to establish public bodies to be known as Scottish Enterprise and Highlands and Islands Enterprise and to make provision as to their functions; to dissolve the Scottish Development Agency and the Highlands and Islands Development Board; to make further provision as regards new towns in Scotland; and for connected purposes.
- Citation: 1990 c. 35
- Territorial extent: Scotland (Note: Section 40(1)(b).)

Dates
- Royal assent: 26 July 1990
- Commencement: 1 October 1990 (in part); 1 April 1991 (rest of act); (Note: Section 39. The Enterprise and New Towns (Scotland) Act 1990 Commencement Order 1990 (SI 1990/1840).)
Other legislation
Amends	Statistics of Trade Act 1947; New Towns (Scotland) Act 1968; Pensions (Increase) Act 1971
Amended by	Trade Union Reform and Employment Rights Act 1993; Gas Act 1995; Employment Tribunals Act 1996; Employment Rights Act 1996; Abolition of Feudal Tenure etc. (Scotland) Act 2000; Statute Law (Repeals) Act 2004; Co-operative and Community Benefit Societies Act 2014

Status: Amended

Text of statute as originally enacted

Text of the Enterprise and New Towns (Scotland) Act 1990 as in force today (including any amendments) within the United Kingdom, from legislation.gov.uk.

The Enterprise and New Towns (Scotland) Act 1990 (c. 35) replaced the Scottish Development Agency and the Highlands and Islands Development Board with Scottish Enterprise and Highlands and Islands Enterprise, and authorised development of further new towns in Scotland.

== New Towns (Amendment) Act 1994 ==
New Towns (Amendment) Act 1994
- Act of Parliament
- Parliament of the United Kingdom
- Long title: An Act to amend Schedule 9 to the New Towns Act 1981.
- Citation: 1994 c. 5
- Territorial extent: England and Wales

Dates
- Royal assent: 24 March 1994
- Commencement: 24 March 1994
- Repealed: 1 April 2004 (Note: The Housing and Regeneration Act 2008 (Commencement No. 4 and Transitory Provisions) Order 2009.)
Other legislation
Amends	New Towns Act 1981
Repealed by	Housing and Regeneration Act 2008

Status: Repealed

Text of statute as originally enacted

Revised text of statute as amended

The New Towns (Amendment) Act 1994 (c. 5) establishes sub-committees of the Commission for New Towns, with authority to act on matters proper to them.

== Towns ==
The following towns were created under various New Towns Acts:

=== England ===
Name	County (Note: Ceremonial county)	Year designated	Built‑up area population (Note: As at 2011 Census)	Note
Basildon	Essex	1949	144,859	Population is for Basildon and Wickford built-up area
Basingstoke	Hampshire	1961	107,642	London overspill expansion, not New Towns Act
Bracknell	Berkshire	1949	77,256	
Central Lancashire	Lancashire	1970	313,332	Development of Preston, Leyland and Chorley urban area, using New Towns Act powers.
Corby	Northamptonshire	1950	56,810	
Crawley	Sussex	1947	180,508	Existing town substantially expanded. Urban area includes Gatwick Airport and Horley
Harlow	Essex	1947	82,059	
Hatfield	Hertfordshire	1948	41,677	Urban area includes Colney Heath and Welham Green
Hemel Hempstead	Hertfordshire	1947	94,932	Built-up area includes Kings Langley
Milton Keynes	Buckinghamshire	1967	229,941	Existing towns and villages substantially expanded and infilled. As of the 2011 census, the Milton Keynes urban area includes Newport Pagnell and Woburn Sands, which were outside the original designated area.
Newton Aycliffe	County Durham	1947	25,964	
Northampton	Northamptonshire	1968	215,963	Existing town significantly expanded
Peterborough	Northamptonshire, Cambridgeshire (Note: reallocated in 1974)	1967	163,379	Existing city substantially expanded
Peterlee	County Durham	1948	27,871	
Redditch	Worcestershire	1964	82,253	Existing town substantially expanded
Runcorn	Cheshire	1963	62,872	
Skelmersdale	Lancashire	1961	34,455	
Stevenage	Hertfordshire	1946	90,232	
Swindon	Wiltshire	1952	185,609	Existing town substantially expanded
Telford	Shropshire	1963 and 1968	147,980	Existing towns substantially expanded and infilled.
Warrington	Lancashire	1968	165,456	Existing town substantially expanded
Washington	Tyne and Wear	1964	67,085	

=== Scotland ===
Name	County	Year designated	Built‑up area population	Note
Cumbernauld	North Lanarkshire	1955	52,270	
East Kilbride	South Lanarkshire	1947	74,395	
Glenrothes	Fife	1948	39,277	
Irvine	North Ayrshire	1966	33,698	Ancient Royal Burgh, substantially expanded
Livingston	West Lothian	1962	56,269	

=== Wales ===
Name	County	Year designated	Built‑up area population	Note
Cwmbran	Gwent	1949	46,915	Now part of the Newport built-up area
Newtown	Powys	1967	11,357	Substantial expansion of existing town

=== Northern Ireland ===
Name	County	Year designated	Built‑up area population	Note
Craigavon	Armagh	1965	64,193	Intended as a linear town to encompass Portadown and Lurgan, but has not yet done so. The population figure is for this statistical area and thus may be misleading.
Antrim	Antrim	1966	25,353	Expansion of an existing town
Ballymena	Antrim	1967	29,467	Expansion of existing town and nearby villages
Derry	Londonderry	1969	91,602	Expansion of an existing city

== See also ==
- Millennium Communities Programme
- English land law
- Town and country planning in the United Kingdom

=== Similar spelling ===
- Newtown Act 1747–8 act of the Parliament of Ireland

== Sources ==
- "Select Committee on Transport, Local Government and the Regions Nineteenth Report". www.parliament.uk. Select Committee on Transport, Local Government and the Regions. Archived from the original on 3 March 2016. "licensed under Open Government Licence"
