= Pay-to-stay (disambiguation) =

Pay-to-stay is the practice of charging prisoners for being incarcerated in American jails.

Pay-to-stay may also mean:

- Pay to stay (housing policy), a proposed UK government housing policy of charging market rates for residence in public housing facilities that was never put into action
- In retailing, a slotting fee, a fee charged to producers by retailers to have their product placed on retail shelves or within the retail supply chain

== See also ==
- Pay-to-play
