= Secure fixed term tenancy =

A secure fixed term tenancy is in the United Kingdom a tenancy existing for a fixed number of years. Fixed term tenancies were introduced in the Housing and Planning Act 2016 replacing the 'lifetime' secure council tenancy for new tenancies issued. The Housing and Planning Act 2016 allows for ten-year tenancies.
