= Housing and Planning Act 2016 =

Act of the Parliament of the United Kingdom

Housing and Planning Act 2016 (Note: Section 217.)
- Act of Parliament
- Parliament of the United Kingdom
- Long title: An Act to make provision about housing, estate agents, rentcharges, planning and compulsory purchase.
- Citation: 2016 c. 22
- Introduced by: Greg Clark MP, Secretary of State for Communities and Local Government (Commons); Baroness Williams of Trafford (Lords)
- Territorial extent: England and Wales; Scotland (in part); Northern Ireland (in part); (Note: Section 215.)

Dates
- Royal assent: 12 May 2016
- Commencement: 12 May 2016; 12 July 2016; (Note: Section 216.)
Other legislation
| Amends | Defence Act 1842; Land Compensation Act 1961; Criminal Justice Act 1972; New Towns Act 1981; Compulsory Purchase (Vesting Declarations) Act 1981; Town and Country Planning Act 1990; Planning (Listed Buildings and Conservation Areas) Act 1990; Water Industry Act 1991; Water Resources Act 1991; Land Drainage Act 1991; Coal Industry Act 1994; Postal Services Act 2000; Land Registration Act 2002; Commons Act 2006; Infrastructure Act 2015; Deregulation Act 2015 |
| Amended by | Wales Act 2017; Social Housing (Regulation) Act 2023; Renters' Rights Act 2025; English Devolution and Community Empowerment Act 2026 |

Status: Amended

History of passage through Parliament

Text of statute as originally enacted

Revised text of statute as amended

The Housing and Planning Act 2016 (c. 22) is act of the Parliament of the United Kingdom that makes widespread changes to housing policy and the planning system. It introduces legislation to allow the sale of higher value local authority homes, introduce starter homes and "Pay to Stay" and other measures intended to promote home ownership and boost levels of housebuilding. The Act has been subject to a number of criticisms by those opposed to the loss of social housing promoted, the extension of right-to-buy to housing associations and possible work disincentives under "Pay to Stay".

== Background ==
When the bill was announced the Government stated that it would kick-start a "national crusade to get 1 million homes built by 2020" and transform "generation rent into generation buy".

The Housing and Planning Bill was introduced on 13 October 2015 by Secretary of State for Communities and Local Government, the Rt Hon Greg Clark MP.

== Changes ==
The Act introduces numerous changes to housing law and planning law:

- A proposal to abolish secure and assured tenancies for new tenancies, and replace them with fixed term tenancies lasting between two and five years. However, following an amendment, this was later extended to tenancies of up to 10 years with the possibility of for longer tenancies for families with children. The Act requires where there is a succession to the tenancy that unless they are a spouse or civil partner the new tenancy has to be fixed term rather than secure. Housing associations are not affected by this change.
- The promotion of self-build and custom build housebuilding
- The building of 200,000 starter homes which will be obtainable to first time buyers between 23 and 40 for sale at 20% below market prices.
- The extension of right to buy to include housing association properties. Due to a deal with the National Housing Federation right to buy will be extended to housing association tenants on a voluntary basis with the Government making payments to housing associations to compensate for the discounts on offer.
- A policy dubbed "pay to stay" that would see some council tenants pay higher rent. Income of £31,000 or £40,000 in London would see someone hit by "Pay to Stay". Tenants in receipt of housing benefit would not be affected by this change and neither would housing association tenants.
- The forced sale of high value empty local authority properties. The stated aim of this policy was to fund right-to-buy for housing associations in order to promote homeownership. The Act states that lost social housing will be replaced with "affordable housing" which could be a starter home. In London two properties will be built for every one sold.
- The speeding up of the planning system to deliver more housing. A concept called "permission in principle" is being introduced which is "an automatic consent for sites identified in local plans and new brownfield registers subject to further technical details being agreed by authorities". It is hoped that this will speed up house building.
- Powers to force local authorities to have a Local Plan where they do not have one.
- Changes to banning orders on "rogue landlords". The Act allows a local authority to apply for a banning order when a landlord or letting agent commits certain offences. The Act also creates a database of rogue landlords that will be maintained by local authorities.
- Changes relating to Rent Repayment Orders allowing a local authority to apply for one where a landlord has committed certain offences.
- A law allowing recovery of abandoned properties. A private landlord will be allowed to do this without serving a section 21 notice and without serving a court order.

== Criticism ==
The Housing and Planning Act was subject to a number of criticisms during its passage.

=== Loss of social housing ===
The housing charity Shelter have criticised the proposal to sell off higher value social housing. John Bibby argues that to raise £4.5b "they [the Government] have to sell off homes in some areas that are relatively cheap – homes that are 'higher value' in name only".

=== Right to buy ===
The Public Accounts Committee have criticised the lack of detail on the policy of extending right-to-buy to housing association tenants.

=== Abandonment law ===
The Act introduces a law of abandonment allowing a landlord to take possession of property where a tenant has abandoned possession. Usually a section 21 notice would need to be served on a tenant in order to take control of a property. Giles Peaker, a partner at Anthony Gold solicitors has argued that the "proposed clauses on tenure and on abandonment are badly drafted and in legal terms, a mess".

=== Work disincentives ===
The "pay to stay" policy has been criticised as potentially discouraging work if it means that council tenants will pay higher rents by increasing their earnings.

== See also ==
- Housing and Planning Act 1986
