= New Towns Act 1965 =

Act of the Parliament of the United Kingdom

New Towns Act 1965 (Note: Section 57(1).)
- Act of Parliament
- Parliament of the United Kingdom
- Long title: An Act to consolidate certain enactments relating to new towns and to matters connected therewith, being (except in the case of section 1(1) of the New Towns Act 1964) those enactments in their application to England and Wales; with corrections and improvements made under the Consolidation of Enactments (Procedure) Act 1949.
- Citation: 1965 c. 59
- Territorial extent: England and Wales; Scotland (in part); (Note: Section 57(3)–(4). Section 43 and certain provisions of section 56(3) and schedule 12 also extended to Scotland.)

Dates
- Royal assent: 5 August 1965
- Commencement: 5 September 1965 (Note: Section 57(2).)
- Repealed: 30 November 1981
Other legislation
Amends	See § Repealed enactments
Repeals/revokes	See § Repealed enactments
Amended by	Rent Act 1965; National Loans Act 1968; New Towns Act 1971; Statute Law (Repeals) Act 1974; New Towns (Amendment) Act 1976; New Towns Act 1977; Highways Act 1980
Repealed by	New Towns Act 1981
Relates to	New Towns (Scotland) Act 1968; New Towns Act 1981

Status: Repealed

Text of statute as originally enacted

The New Towns Act 1965 (c. 59) was an act of the Parliament of the United Kingdom that consolidated enactments relating to new towns in their application to England and Wales.

The New Towns (Scotland) Act 1968 made equivalent provisions for Scotland.

== Provisions ==
The principal provisions of the act were these@

- Designation of sites of new towns.
- Establishment of development corporations for new towns.
  - Allocation or transfer of new town functions to existing or new development corporation.
- Power to make new town a united district for purposes of Public Health Acts.
- Establishment of the Commission for New Towns.

The first and arguably the most significant development to be authorised by the act was Milton Keynes, with a design brief to be a city for 250,000 residents.

=== Repealed enactments ===
Section 56(3) of the act repealed 15 enactments, listed in the twelfth schedule to the act.

Extended content

Citation	Short title	Extent of repeal
7 & 8 Geo. 6. c. 47	Town and Country Planning Act 1944	The whole act.
8 & 9 Geo. 6. c. 42	Water Act 1945	In Schedule 2, paragraph 1(5).
9 & 10 Geo. 6. c. 18	Statutory Orders (Special Procedure) Act 1945	In Schedule 2, the entries relating to the Town and Country Planning Act 1944.
9 & 10 Geo. 6. c. 68	New Towns Act 1946	The whole act.
10 & 11 Geo. 6. c. 51	Town and Country Planning Act 1947	Section 46. In Schedule 8, the entry relating to the New Towns Act 1946.
12 & 13 Geo. 6. c. 59	Licensing Act 1949	Section 4(1).
15 & 16 Geo. 6 & 1 Eliz. 2. c. 54	Town Development Act 1952	Section 18. The Schedule.
6 & 7 Eliz. 2. c. 12	New Towns Act 1958	The whole act.
7 & 8 Eliz. 2. c. 62	New Towns Act 1959	The whole act, except— section 4; section 9(1) and (3); section 10; section 12(1); in section 14(1), the words from the beginning to "the New Towns Act 1959"; section 14(2) and (3); paragraph 1(10) of Schedule 1.
9 & 10 Eliz. 2. c. 33	Land Compensation Act 1961	In Schedule 4, paragraphs 1 to 5.
9 & 10 Eliz. 2. c. 64	Public Health Act 1961	In section 84(1), the words from "Subsection (3)" to "to new towns)".
9 & 10 Eliz. 2. c. 65	Housing Act 1961	In Schedule 2, paragraph 16.
10 & 11 Eliz. 2. c. 38	Town and Country Planning Act 1962	In Schedule 14, paragraph 47.
1964 c. 8	New Towns Act 1964	The whole act.
1964 c. 68	New Towns (No. 2) Act 1964	The whole act.

== Subsequent developments ==
Section 56(3) of, and schedule 12 to, the act were repealed by section 1 of, and part XI of the schedule to, the Statute Law (Repeals) Act 1974, which came into force on 27 June 1974.

The whole act was repealed by section 81(b) of, and schedule 13 to, the New Towns Act 1981 (c. 64), which came into force on 30 November 1981.
