= List of acts of the Parliament of the United Kingdom from 1964 =

This is a list of acts of the Parliament of the United Kingdom passed in 1964.

Acts passed since 1963 are cited by calendar year, as opposed to the convention used for earlier acts of citing the regnal year(s) in which the relevant parliamentary session was held. Each act passed in a respective year is given a chapter number (abbreviated "c."), denoted by Arabic numerals in the case of public general acts, lowercase Roman numerals in the case of local acts, or italicised Arabic numerals in the case of personal acts. These run as separate series.

141 acts of Parliament were passed in 1964: 98 public general acts and 43 local acts.

indicates that an act has been transcribed on Wikisource, indicates that an act is available to view at legislation.gov.uk, and indicates the location of the original act in the Parliamentary Archives.

== Public general acts ==
Short title	Citation	Royal assent
Long title
Consolidated Fund Act 1964 (repealed)	1964 c. 1	6 February 1964
An Act to apply a sum out of the Consolidated Fund to the service of the year ending on 31st March 1964. (Repealed by Statute Law (Repeals) Act 1971 (c. 52))
Air Corporations Act 1964 (repealed)	1964 c. 2	6 February 1964
An Act to extend the powers of the British Overseas Airways Corporation and the British European Airways Corporation to borrow from the Minister of Aviation sums required by them for financing any accumulated deficits of theirs on revenue account. (Repealed by Air Corporations Act 1966 (c. 11))
Post Office (Borrowing Powers) Act 1964 (repealed)	1964 c. 3	6 February 1964
An Act to increase the limits imposed by section 10(2) of the Post Office Act 1961. (Note: Post Office Act 1961 (9 & 10 Eliz. 2. c. 15)) (Repealed by Post Office (Borrowing Powers) Act 1967 (c. 15))
Trustee Savings Banks Act 1964 (repealed)	1964 c. 4	27 February 1964
An Act to make provision concerning the undertaking by a trustee savings bank of a service comprising the operation of current accounts for depositors of money with the bank, and for matters connected therewith. (Repealed by Trustee Savings Banks Act 1969 (c. 50))
International Headquarters and Defence Organisations Act 1964	1964 c. 5	27 February 1964
An Act to make provision as to certain international headquarters and defence organisations.
Export Guarantees Act 1964 (repealed)	1964 c. 6	27 February 1964
An Act to amend the Export Guarantees Acts 1949 to 1961. (Repealed by Export Guarantees Act 1968 (c. 26))
Shipbuilding Credit Act 1964 (repealed)	1964 c. 7	27 February 1964
An Act to enable the Minister of Transport to make loans for the purpose of providing finance for the construction or alteration of ships in shipyards situated in the United Kingdom, any of the Channel Islands or the Isle of Man and the equipment of the resulting ships. (Repealed by Statute Law (Repeals) Act 1986 (c. 12))
New Towns Act 1964 (repealed)	1964 c. 8	27 February 1964
An Act to make fresh provision respecting the limits on the amount of the advances which may be made to development corporations under section 12(1) of the New Towns Act 1946 (Note: New Towns Act 1946 (9 & 10 Geo. 6. c. 68)) and the Commission for the New Towns under section 3(1) of the New Towns Act 1959. (Note: New Towns Act 1959 (7 & 8 Eliz. 2. c. 62)) (Repealed for England and Wales by New Towns Act 1965 (c. 59) and for Scotland by New Towns (Scotland) Act 1968 (c. 16))
Public Works Loans Act 1964	1964 c. 9	27 February 1964
An Act to make further provision with respect to loans out of the Local Loans Fund, with respect to temporary borrowing by local authorities in Scotland and with respect to the re-borrowing powers of public authorities; to authorise an increase in the loans which may be made to the Government of Northern Ireland; and for connected purposes.
Family Allowances and National Insurance Act 1964 (repealed)	1964 c. 10	27 February 1964
An Act to extend the meaning of the word "child" in the Family Allowances Acts, the National Insurance Acts and the National Insurance (Industrial Injuries) Acts, to increase widowed mother's allowance and certain other benefits under the National Insurance Acts and the National Insurance (Industrial Injuries) Acts paid in respect of or by reference to children, to require the disregard of part of any such benefit in arriving at the amount of a national assistance grant, and for certain other purposes, and to relax the earnings rules relating to widow's benefit and retirement pensions, and for connected purposes. (Repealed by Ministry of Social Security Act 1966 (c. 20))
Navy, Army and Air Force Reserves Act 1964 (repealed)	1964 c. 11	27 February 1964
An Act to make further provision with respect to navy, army and air force reserves. (Repealed by Reserve Forces Act 1980 (c. 9))
Episcopal Church (Scotland) Act 1964	1964 c. 12	27 February 1964
An Act to remove a disability restricting the Clergy of the Episcopal Church in Scotland in the exercise of their office in England.
International Development Association Act 1964 (repealed)	1964 c. 13	12 March 1964
An Act to enable effect to be given to a resolution of the board of governors of the International Development Association. (Repealed by Overseas Development and Co-operation Act 1980 (c. 63))
Plant Varieties and Seeds Act 1964	1964 c. 14	12 March 1964
An Act to provide for the granting of proprietary rights to persons who breed or discover plant varieties and for the issue of compulsory licences in respect thereof; to establish a tribunal to hear appeals and other proceedings relating to the rights, and to exclude certain agreements relating to the rights from Part I of the Restrictive Trade Practices Act 1956; (Note: Restrictive Trade Practices Act 1956 (4 & 5 Eliz. 2. c. 68)) to confer power to regulate, and to amend in other respects the law relating to, transactions in seeds and seed potatoes, including provision for the testing of seeds and seed potatoes, the establishment of an index of names of varieties and the imposition of restrictions as respects the introduction of new varieties; to control the import of seeds and seed potatoes; to authorise measures to prevent injurious cross-pollination; and for connected purposes.
Defence (Transfer of Functions) Act 1964	1964 c. 15	12 March 1964
An Act to facilitate the making of new arrangements for the central organisation of defence, and to provide for matters consequential thereon.
Industrial Training Act 1964	1964 c. 16	12 March 1964
An Act to make further provision for industrial and commercial training; to raise the limit on contributions out of the National Insurance Fund towards the expenses of the Minister of Labour in providing training courses; and for purposes connected with those matters.
Consolidated Fund (No. 2) Act 1964 (repealed)	1964 c. 17	25 March 1964
An Act to apply certain sums out of the Consolidated Fund to the service of the years ending on 31st March 1963, 1964 and 1965. (Repealed by Statute Law (Repeals) Act 1971 (c. 52))
Rating (Interim Relief) Act 1964 (repealed)	1964 c. 18	25 March 1964
An Act to make provision with respect to England and Wales for grants to rating authorities by reference to the proportion of elderly persons in the population of their areas and for the mitigation of hardship to residential occupiers attributable to the increase in the level of rates; and for connected purposes. (Repealed by Statute Law (Repeals) Act 1989 (c. 43))
Married Women's Property Act 1964	1964 c. 19	25 March 1964
An Act to amend the law relating to rights of property as between husband and wife.
Uganda Act 1964	1964 c. 20	25 March 1964
An Act to make provision as to the operation of the law in relation to Uganda as a Commonwealth Country not within Her Majesty's dominions.
Television Act 1964	1964 c. 21	25 March 1964
An Act to consolidate the Television Acts 1954 (Note: Television Act 1954 (2 & 3 Eliz. 2. c. 55)) and 1963. (Note: Television Act 1963 (c. 50))
British Nationality Act 1964 (repealed)	1964 c. 22	25 March 1964
An Act to facilitate the resumption or renunciation of citizenship of the United Kingdom and Colonies. (Repealed by British Nationality Act 1981 (c. 61))
Fireworks Act 1964 (repealed)	1964 c. 23	25 March 1964
An Act to exempt fireworks consigned for export from the requirements of the Fireworks Act 1951 (Note: Fireworks Act 1951 (14 & 15 Geo. 6. c. 58)) as to marking. (Repealed by Pyrotechnic Articles (Safety) Regulations 2010 (SI 2010/1554))
Trade Union (Amalgamations, etc.) Act 1964 (repealed)	1964 c. 24	25 March 1964
An Act to amend the law relating to the amalgamation of trade unions, the transfer of engagements from one trade union to another, and the alteration of the name of a trade union. (Repealed by Trade Union and Labour Relations (Consolidation) Act 1992 (c. 52))
War Damage Act 1964 (repealed)	1964 c. 25	25 March 1964
An Act to make provision for expediting the completion of payments under the War Damage Act 1943, (Note: War Damage Act 1943 (6 & 7 Geo. 6. c. 21)) the War Damage (Public Utility Undertakings, &c.) Act 1949 (Note: War Damage (Public Utility Undertakings, &c.) Act 1949 (12, 13 & 14 Geo. 6. c. 36)) and the War Damage (Clearance Payments) Act 1960; (Note: War Damage (Clearance Payments) Act 1960 (8 & 9 Eliz. 2. c. 25)) to dissolve the War Damage Commission and transfer to the Commissioners of Inland Revenue, or, in the case of payments under section 71 of the said Act of 1943, to the Minister of Transport or the Secretary of State, the functions of the War Damage Commission and any functions which remain to be performed under those Acts by the Board of Trade; and for purposes connected with the matters aforesaid. (Repealed by Statute Law (Repeals) Act 1981 (c. 19))
Licensing Act 1964 (repealed)	1964 c. 26	25 March 1964
An Act to consolidate certain enactments relating to the sale and supply of intoxicating liquor in England and Wales and to matters connected therewith; with corrections and improvements made under the Consolidation of Enactments (Procedure) Act 1949. (Note: Consolidation of Enactments (Procedure) Act 1949 (12, 13 & 14 Geo. 6. c. 33)) (Repealed by Licensing Act 2003 (c. 17))
Salmon and Freshwater Fisheries Act 1923 (Amendment) Act 1964 (repealed)	1964 c. 27	25 March 1964
An Act to amend section 6 of the Salmon and Freshwater Fisheries Act 1923 (Note: Salmon and Freshwater Fisheries Act 1923 (13 & 14 Geo. 5. c. 16)) with respect to the mode of working nets. (Repealed by Statute Law (Repeals) Act 1974 (c. 22))
Agriculture and Horticulture Act 1964	1964 c. 28	15 April 1964
An Act to make provision for and in connection with the maintenance of minimum price levels for imports affecting the market for agricultural or horticultural produce of descriptions produced in the United Kingdom; to make further provision for assisting by the payment of grants the production and marketing of horticultural produce; to impose requirements as to the grading of horticultural produce when dealt in in bulk and as to the mode of packing and transporting such produce; and for purposes connected with the matters aforesaid.
Continental Shelf Act 1964	1964 c. 29	15 April 1964
An Act to make provision as to the exploration and exploitation of the continental shelf; to enable effect to be given to certain provisions of the Convention on the High Seas (Note: Convention on the High Seas) done in Geneva on 29th April 1958; and for matters connected with those purposes.
Legal Aid Act 1964 (repealed)	1964 c. 30	15 April 1964
An Act to provide for the payment out of the legal aid funds of costs incurred by successful opponents of legally aided litigants. (Repealed for Scotland by Legal Aid (Scotland) Act 1967 (c. 43) and for England and Wales by Legal Aid Act 1974 (c. 4))
Elections (Welsh Forms) Act 1964 (repealed)	1964 c. 31	10 June 1964
An Act to authorise the use, in connection with elections in Wales and Monmouthshire, of translations of statutory forms into the Welsh language. (Repealed by Representation of the People Act 1983 (c. 2))
National Health Service (Hospital Boards) Act 1964	1964 c. 32	10 June 1964
An Act to make provision for changing the name of Regional Hospital Boards in England and Wales to that of Hospital Board.
Burgh Police (Amendment) (Scotland) Act 1964	1964 c. 33	10 June 1964
An Act to amend paragraph (36) of section 381 of the Burgh Police (Scotland) Act 1892 (Note: Burgh Police (Scotland) Act 1892 (55 & 56 Vict. c. 55)) with regard to the laying down of salt on streets and footways in burghs in Scotland in time of snow or frost.
Criminal Procedure (Right of Reply) Act 1964	1964 c. 34	10 June 1964
An Act to amend the law relating to the prosecution's right of reply at trials on indictment.
Pharmacy and Poisons (Amendment) Act 1964 (repealed)	1964 c. 35	10 June 1964
An Act to make provision for increase of the fees payable by authorised sellers of poisons in connection with the registration of their premises, and for that purpose to amend the Pharmacy and Poisons Act 1933. (Note: Pharmacy and Poisons Act 1933 (23 & 24 Geo. 5. c. 25)) (Repealed by Statute Law (Repeals) Act 1975 (c. 10))
Dangerous Drugs Act 1964 (repealed)	1964 c. 36	10 June 1964
An Act to amend the Dangerous Drugs Act 1951; (Note: Dangerous Drugs Act 1951 (14 & 15 Geo. 6. c. 48)) to create certain offences in connection with the drug known as cannabis and to penalize the intentional cultivation of any plant of the genus cannabis; and for purposes connected with the matters aforesaid. (Repealed by Dangerous Drugs Act 1965 (c. 15))
Income Tax Management Act 1964 (repealed)	1964 c. 37	10 June 1964
An Act to amend the law relating to General Commissioners for the purposes of the income tax and their clerks and officers of Inland Revenue; to transfer from the General or other Commissioners to officers of Inland Revenue the powers of assessing income tax and related functions; to transfer from the Commissioners of Inland Revenue to inspectors of taxes the powers of assessing the profits tax; to make further provision as respects the jurisdiction of Special Commissioners and General Commissioners in appeals and other proceedings relating to income tax and the profits tax; to make further provision as respects such proceedings in Northern Ireland; to make further provision for the recovery of income tax or the profits tax charged by an assessment before the determination of an appeal against the assessment and in other cases; and to re-enact with consequential and minor amendments provisions of the Income Tax Acts concerning returns of income and the procedure on claims for relief from tax, and to make other minor amendments in the administrative provisions of those Acts, of the enactments relating to the profits tax and of other enactments relating to inland revenue. (Repealed by Income and Corporation Taxes Act 1970 (c. 10))
Emergency Powers Act 1964	1964 c. 38	10 June 1964
An Act to amend the Emergency Powers Act 1920 (Note: Emergency Powers Act 1920 (10 & 11 Geo. 5. c. 55)) and make permanent the Defence (Armed Forces) Regulations 1939. (Note: Defence (Armed Forces) Regulations 1939 (SR&O 1939/1304))
Protection of Animals (Anaesthetics) Act 1964	1964 c. 39	10 June 1964
An Act to amend the Protection of Animals (Anaesthetics) Act 1954. (Note: Protection of Animals (Anaesthetics) Act 1954 (2 & 3 Eliz. 2. c. 46))
Harbours Act 1964	1964 c. 40	10 June 1964
An Act to establish a National Ports Council; to provide for the control of harbour development and for giving financial assistance for the improvement of harbours; to make other provision respecting the construction, improvement, maintenance and management of harbours; to make provision with respect to charges of certain harbour authorities and lighthouse authorities; and for purposes connected with the matters aforesaid.
Succession (Scotland) Act 1964	1964 c. 41	10 June 1964
An Act to assimilate and amend the law of Scotland with respect to the succession to the heritable and moveable property of deceased persons; to amend the law in relation to the legal and other prior rights exigible out of such property, to the administration of deceased persons' estates and other property passing on death, to the capacity of minors to test, and to the presumption of survivorship; to provide for certain testamentary dispositions to be probative; to provide for adopted persons to be treated for certain purposes as children of their adopters; to make new provision as to the financial rights and obligations of the parties on the dissolution of a marriage; and for purposes connected with the matters aforesaid.
Administration of Justice Act 1964	1964 c. 42	10 June 1964
An Act to make provision with respect to the administration of justice in the metropolitan area; to provide for a lieutenant and deputy lieutenants for Greater London; to make fresh provision with respect to the indemnification of justices and their clerks, recorders and clerks of the peace; to make minor amendments of the law relating to the administration of justice in England and Wales and an amendment of section 8 of the Justices of the Peace Act 1949 (Note: Justices of the Peace Act 1949 (12, 13 & 14 Geo. 6. c. 101)) extending to Scotland; and for connected purposes.
Criminal Appeal Act 1964 (repealed)	1964 c. 43	10 June 1964
An Act to enable the Court of Criminal Appeal to order new trials in cases of fresh evidence; to make corresponding provision for new trials by court-martial; and for connected purposes. (Repealed by Supreme Court Act 1981 (c. 54))
Nurses Act 1964	1964 c. 44	10 June 1964
An Act to make further provision concerning the admission of persons to the roll of nurses maintained for England and Wales under section 2(1)(b) of the Nurses Act 1957 (Note: Nurses Act 1957 (5 & 6 Eliz. 2. c. 15)) and that maintained for Scotland under section 3(1) of the Nurses (Scotland) Act 1951. (Note: Nurses (Scotland) Act 1951 (14 & 15 Geo. 6. c. 55))
Road Traffic Act 1964 (repealed)	1964 c. 45	10 June 1964
An Act to amend the provisions of the Road Traffic Act 1962 (Note: Road Traffic Act 1962 (10 & 11 Eliz. 2. c. 59)) relating to temporary or experimental speed limits. (Repealed by Road Traffic Regulation Act 1967 (c. 76))
Malawi Independence Act 1964	1964 c. 46	10 June 1964
An Act to make provision for and in connection with the attainment by Nyasaland of fully responsible status within the Commonwealth.
Merchant Shipping Act 1964	1964 c. 47	10 June 1964
An Act to enable effect to be given to an International Convention for the Safety of Life at Sea signed in London on 17th June 1960; to amend section 271 of the Merchant Shipping Act 1894; (Note: Merchant Shipping Act 1894 (57 & 58 Vict. c. 60)) and for purposes connected therewith.
Police Act 1964	1964 c. 48	10 June 1964
An Act to re-enact with modifications certain enactments relating to police forces in England and Wales, to amend the Police (Scotland) Act 1956, (Note: Police (Scotland) Act 1956 (4 & 5 Eliz. 2. c. 26)) and to make further provision with respect to the police.
Finance Act 1964 (repealed)	1964 c. 49	16 July 1964
An Act to grant certain duties, to alter other duties, and to amend the law relating to the National Debt and the Public Revenue, and to make further provision in connection with Finance. (Repealed by Statute Law (Repeals) Act 2008 (c. 12))
Tenancy of Shops (Scotland) Act 1964 (repealed)	1964 c. 50	16 July 1964
An Act to continue (with amendment) the Tenancy of Shops (Scotland) Act 1949. (Note: Tenancy of Shops (Scotland) Act 1949 (12, 13 & 14 Geo. 6. c. 25)) (Repealed by Statute Law (Repeals) Act 1974 (c. 22))
Universities and College Estates Act 1964	1964 c. 51	16 July 1964
An Act to amend the law relating to property held by or on behalf of universities and colleges, and for purposes connected therewith.
Films Act 1964 (repealed)	1964 c. 52	16 July 1964
An Act to amend the Films Act 1960 (Note: Films Act 1960 (8 & 9 Eliz. 2. c. 57)) in its application to newsreels. (Repealed by Films Act 1985 (c. 21))
Hire-Purchase Act 1964	1964 c. 53	16 July 1964
An Act to amend the law relating to hire-purchase and credit-sale, and, in relation thereto, to amend the enactments relating to the sale of goods; to make provision with respect to dispositions of motor vehicles which have been let or agreed to be sold by way of hire-purchase or conditional sale; to amend the Advertisements (Hire-Purchase) Act 1957; (Note: Advertisements (Hire-Purchase) Act 1957 (5 & 6 Eliz. 2. c. 41)) and for purposes connected with the matters aforesaid.
British Nationality (No. 2) Act 1964 (repealed)	1964 c. 54	16 July 1964
An Act to provide for the acquisition of citizenship of the United Kingdom and Colonies by certain classes of persons who would otherwise be stateless; to restrict the grounds on which persons may be deprived of such citizenship where deprivation would render them stateless; to repeal section 20(4) and section 21 of the British Nationality Act 1948; (Note: British Nationality Act 1948 (11 & 12 Geo. 6. c. 56)) and to extend the powers exercisable under that Act with respect to British protected persons. (Repealed by British Nationality Act 1981 (c. 61))
Perpetuities and Accumulations Act 1964	1964 c. 55	16 July 1964
An Act to modify the law of England and Wales relating to the avoidance of future interests in property on grounds of remoteness and governing accumulations of income from property.
Housing Act 1964	1964 c. 56	16 July 1964
An Act to set up a new body to assist housing societies to provide housing accommodation, to confer powers and duties on local authorities to compel the carrying out of works for the improvement of dwellings which are without all or any of the standard amenities, to amend the law relating to the giving of financial assistance for the improvement of housing accommodation, to make further provision as to the powers and duties of local authorities as respects houses let in lodgings or occupied by more than one family, to amend the provisions of the Clean Air Act 1956 (Note: Clean Air Act 1956 (4 & 5 Eliz. 2. c. 52)) relating to the making of contributions to expenditure incurred in the adaptation of fireplaces in private dwellings, and to amend in other respects the law relating to housing.
Adoption Act 1964 (repealed)	1964 c. 57	16 July 1964
An Act to provide for effect to be given to certain adoption orders made outside Great Britain; to facilitate the proof of adoption orders in different parts of the United Kingdom; and for connected purposes. (Repealed for England and Wales by Adoption Act 1976 (c. 36) and for Scotland by Adoption (Scotland) Act 1978 (c. 28))
Resale Prices Act 1964	1964 c. 58	16 July 1964
An Act to restrict the maintenance by contractual and other means of minimum resale prices in respect of goods supplied for resale in the United Kingdom; and for purposes connected therewith.
Protection of Birds Act 1954 (Amendment) Act 1964	1964 c. 59	16 July 1964
An Act to provide that section 10 of the Protection of Birds Act 1954 (Note: Protection of Birds Act 1954 (2 & 3 Eliz. 2. c. 30)) shall no longer extend to Northern Ireland except so far as it relates to importation of birds or their eggs.
Emergency Laws (Re-enactments and Repeals) Act 1964	1964 c. 60	16 July 1964
An Act to repeal the remaining Defence Regulations (that is to say those set out in the Emergency Laws (Repeal) Act 1959), (Note: Emergency Laws (Repeal) Act 1959 (7 & 8 Eliz. 2. c. 19)) except the Defence (Armed Forces) Regulations 1939, and to re-enact certain of those Defence Regulations with modifications; and to continue for limited periods the Ships and Aircraft (Transfer Restriction) Act 1939 (Note: Ships and Aircraft (Transfer Restriction) Act 1939 (2 & 3 Geo. 6. c. 70)) and certain powers of the Board of Trade relating to jute products.
Animals (Restriction of Importation) Act 1964	1964 c. 61	16 July 1964
An Act to restrict the importation of live animals of certain kinds.
Appropriation Act 1964 (repealed)	1964 c. 62	31 July 1964
An Act to apply a sum out of the Consolidated Fund to the service of the year ending on 31st March 1965, and to appropriate the supplies granted in this Session of Parliament. (Repealed by Statute Law (Repeals) Act 1971 (c. 52))
Law of Property (Joint Tenants) Act 1964	1964 c. 63	31 July 1964
An Act to amend the law with respect to land vested in joint tenants.
Drugs (Prevention of Misuse) Act 1964 (repealed)	1964 c. 64	31 July 1964
An Act to penalize the possession, and restrict the importation, of drugs of certain kinds. (Repealed by Misuse of Drugs Act 1971 (c. 38))
Zambia Independence Act 1964	1964 c. 65	31 July 1964
An Act to make provision for, and in connection with, the establishment of Northern Rhodesia, under the name of Zambia, as an independent republic within the Commonwealth.
Young Persons (Employment) Act 1964 (repealed)	1964 c. 66	31 July 1964
An Act to extend the kinds of occupations in the case of which the hours of employment of young persons employed therein are regulated by the Young Persons (Employment) Act 1938 (Note: Young Persons (Employment) Act 1938 (1 & 2 Geo. 6. c. 69)) and to increase the penalty for an offence against section 1 of that Act. (Repealed by Employment Act 1989 (c. 38))
Local Government (Development and Finance) (Scotland) Act 1964	1964 c. 67	31 July 1964
An Act to enable local authorities in Scotland to develop, and assist in the development of, land and to make provision for the disposal of litter and the advertising of amenities; to empower such authorities to set up certain capital funds and renewal and repair funds, to borrow by means of bonds and to allow discount for early payment of rates; and for purposes connected with the matters aforesaid.
New Towns (No. 2) Act 1964 (repealed)	1964 c. 68	31 July 1964
An Act to provide that orders designating new town areas or extensions thereof shall be subject to annulment by either House of Parliament. (Repealed for England and Wales by New Towns Act 1965 (c. 59) and for Scotland by New Towns (Scotland) Act 1968 (c. 16))
Scrap Metal Dealers Act 1964 (repealed)	1964 c. 69	31 July 1964
An Act to amend the law relating to dealers in scrap metal and similar goods, and to dealers in marine stores, and for purposes connected therewith. (Repealed by Scrap Metal Dealers Act 2013 (c. 10))
Riding Establishments Act 1964	1964 c. 70	31 July 1964
An Act to regulate the keeping of riding establishments; and for purposes connected therewith.
Trading Stamps Act 1964 (repealed)	1964 c. 71	31 July 1964
An Act to make provision with respect to trading stamps, including provision for regulating the issue, use and redemption of trading stamps; to provide for regulating the business of issuing and redeeming trading stamps; and for purposes connected with the matters aforesaid. (Repealed by Regulatory Reform (Trading Stamps) Order 2005 (SI 2005/871))
Fishery Limits Act 1964	1964 c. 72	31 July 1964
An Act to extend the British fishery limits and amend the definition of "sea-fishing" in the Sea Fisheries Act 1883. (Note: Sea Fisheries Act 1883 (46 & 47 Vict. c. 22))
British North America Act 1964 renamed in Canada to Constitution Act, 1965	1964 c. 73	31 July 1964
An Act to amend the British North America Act 1867. (Note: British North America Act 1867 (30 & 31 Vict. c. 3))
Obscene Publications Act 1964	1964 c. 74	31 July 1964
An Act to strengthen the law for preventing the publication for gain of obscene matter and the publication of things intended for the production of obscene matter.
Public Libraries and Museums Act 1964	1964 c. 75	31 July 1964
An Act to place the public library service provided by local authorities in England and Wales under the superintendence of the Secretary of State, to make new provision for regulating and improving that service and as to the provision and maintenance of museums and art galleries by such authorities, and for purposes connected with the matters aforesaid.
Malicious Damage Act 1964 (repealed)	1964 c. 76	31 July 1964
An Act to extend the jurisdiction of magistrates' courts under section 14 of the Criminal Justice Administration Act 1914, (Note: Criminal Justice Administration Act 1914 (4 & 5 Geo. 5. c. 58)) and otherwise to amend that section. (Repealed by Criminal Damage Act 1971 (c. 48))
Local Government (Pecuniary Interests) Act 1964 (repealed)	1964 c. 77	31 July 1964
An Act to amend sections 76 and 123 of the Local Government Act 1933, (Note: Local Government Act 1933 (23 & 24 Geo. 5. c. 51)) and sections 52 and 90 of the London Government Act 1939. (Note: London Government Act 1939 (2 & 3 Geo. 6. c. 40)) (Repealed by Local Government Act 1972 (c. 70))
Betting, Gaming and Lotteries Act 1964 (repealed)	1964 c. 78	31 July 1964
An Act to amend the Betting, Gaming and Lotteries Act 1963 (Note: Betting, Gaming and Lotteries Act 1963 (c. 2)) with respect to gaming machines and with respect to the provision of amusements with prizes. (Repealed by Gaming Act 1968 (c. 65))
Statute Law Revision Act 1964 (repealed)	1964 c. 79	31 July 1964
An Act to revise the statute law by repealing obsolete, spent, unnecessary or superseded enactments. (Repealed by Statute Law (Repeals) Act 1974 (c. 22))
Statute Law Revision (Scotland) Act 1964	1964 c. 80	31 July 1964
An Act to revise the statute law of Scotland by repealing obsolete, spent, unnecessary, or superseded enactments, and to facilitate the citation of statutes.
Diplomatic Privileges Act 1964	1964 c. 81	31 July 1964
An Act to amend the law on diplomatic privileges and immunities by giving effect to the Vienna Convention on Diplomatic Relations; and for purposes connected therewith.
Education Act 1964 (repealed)	1964 c. 82	31 July 1964
An Act to enable county schools and voluntary schools to be established for providing full-time education by reference to age-limits differing from those specified in the Education Act 1944, (Note: Education Act 1944 (7 & 8 Geo. 6. c. 31)) as amended by the Education (Miscellaneous Provisions) Act 1948; (Note: Education (Miscellaneous Provisions) Act 1948 (11 & 12 Geo. 6. c. 40)) to enable maintenance allowances to be granted in respect of pupils at special schools who would be over compulsory school age, or, in Scotland, over school age, but for section 38(1) of the said Act of 1944 or section 32(4) of the Education (Scotland) Act 1962; (Note: Education (Scotland) Act 1962 (10 & 11 Eliz. 2. c. 47)) and for purposes connected with the matters aforesaid. (Repealed by Education Act 1996 (c. 56))
New Forest Act 1964	1964 c. 83	31 July 1964
An Act to alter the perambulation of the New Forest, to make further provision for the New Forest, to amend the New Forest Acts 1877 to 1949 and for purposes connected with the matters aforesaid.
Criminal Procedure (Insanity) Act 1964	1964 c. 84	31 July 1964
An Act to amend the form of the special verdict required by section 2 of the Trial of Lunatics Act 1883 (Note: Trial of Lunatics Act 1883 (46 & 47 Vict. c. 38)) and the procedure for determining whether an accused person is under a disability such as to constitute a bar to his being tried; to provide for an appeal against such a special verdict or a finding that the accused is under such a disability; to confer on the court of trial and the Court of Criminal Appeal further powers of making orders for admission to hospital; to empower the prosecution to put forward evidence of insanity or diminished responsibility; and for purposes connected with the matters aforesaid.
John F. Kennedy Memorial Act 1964	1964 c. 85	31 July 1964
An Act to vest in the United States of America a site at Runnymede forming part of the Crown Estate to be preserved in perpetuity in memory of the late President John F. Kennedy for the use and enjoyment of the public under the control and management of the Trustees of the Kennedy Memorial Fund.
Malta Independence Act 1964	1964 c. 86	31 July 1964
An Act to make provision for, and in connection with, the attainment by Malta of fully responsible status within the Commonwealth.
Shipping Contracts and Commercial Documents Act 1964	1964 c. 87	31 July 1964
An Act to secure Her Majesty's jurisdiction against encroachment by certain foreign requirements in respect of the carriage of goods or passengers by sea and in respect of the production of documents and furnishing of information.
Refreshment Houses Act 1964 (repealed)	1964 c. 88	31 July 1964
An Act for the better regulation of refreshment houses within the meaning of the Refreshment Houses Act 1860. (Note: Refreshment Houses Act 1860 (23 & 24 Vict. c. 27)) (Repealed by Licensing Act 2003 (c. 17))
Hairdressers (Registration) Act 1964	1964 c. 89	31 July 1964
An Act to provide for the registration of hairdressers; and for purposes connected therewith.
Spray Irrigation (Scotland) Act 1964 (repealed)	1964 c. 90	31 July 1964
An Act to enable river purification boards in Scotland in pursuance of their functions to control the abstraction of water for the purpose of spray irrigation; and for purposes connected therewith. (Repealed by Natural Heritage (Scotland) Act 1991 (c. 28))
Divorce (Scotland) Act 1964	1964 c. 91	31 July 1964
An Act to amend the law of Scotland relating to divorce and to other consistorial causes; to facilitate reconciliation in such causes; to confer new powers on the courts to award interim aliment; and for purposes connected with the matters aforesaid.
Finance (No. 2) Act 1964 (repealed)	1964 c. 92	17 December 1964
An Act to grant certain duties, to alter other duties and to make further provision in connection with Finance. (Repealed by Statute Law (Repeals) Act 1986 (c. 12))
Gambia Independence Act 1964	1964 c. 93	17 December 1964
An Act to make provision for, and in connection with, the attainment by The Gambia of fully responsible status within the Commonwealth.
Expiring Laws Continuance Act 1964 (repealed)	1964 c. 94	17 December 1964
An Act to continue certain expiring laws. (Repealed by Statute Law (Repeals) Act 1971 (c. 52))
Travel Concessions Act 1964	1964 c. 95	17 December 1964
An Act to remove certain restrictions on the power of local authorities to make arrangements for the granting of travel concessions and to adjust the class of persons to whom such concessions may be granted on the raising of the school age.
National Insurance &c. Act 1964 (repealed)	1964 c. 96	17 December 1964
An Act to amend the provisions as to contributions (other than graduated contributions) and benefits under the National Insurance Acts 1946 to 1964 and the National Insurance (Industrial Injuries) Acts 1946 to 1964; to abolish the earnings rule for widowed mother's allowance and widow's pension under the first-mentioned Acts; to improve the allowances payable out of the Industrial Injuries Fund in respect of incapacities arising from pre-1948 employment; to make, with a view to facilitating the preparation of Acts to consolidate the aforementioned Acts and the Family Allowances Acts 1945 to 1964, provision designed to avoid or remove minor doubts, anomalies and differences, and minor complications in administration, in those Acts; and for connected purposes. (Repealed by Statute Law Revision (Consequential Repeals) Act 1965 (c. 55), Workmen's Compensation and Benefit (Amendment) Act 1965 (c. 79), Ministry of Social Security Act 1966 (c. 20) and Industrial Injuries and Diseases (Old Cases) Act 1967 (c. 34))
Protection from Eviction Act 1964	1964 c. 97	17 December 1964
An Act to restrict eviction from dwellings; to postpone the decontrol of formerly requisitioned dwellings; and for purposes connected therewith.
Ministers of the Crown Act 1964 (repealed)	1964 c. 98	23 December 1964
An Act to make provision with respect to the departments and salaries of certain Ministers; to amend the provisions of the House of Commons Disqualification Act 1957 (Note: House of Commons Disqualification Act 1957 (5 & 6 Eliz. 2. c. 20)) relating to Ministerial offices; to extend existing powers to transfer functions of Ministers; and for purposes connected with the matters aforesaid. (Repealed by Ministerial Salaries and Members' Pensions Act 1965 (c. 11), Ministerial Salaries Consolidation Act 1965 (c. 58), Ministry of Social Security Act 1966 (c. 20), Ministry of Aviation (Dissolution) Order 1967 (SI 1967/155), Ministry of Land and Natural Resources (Dissolution) Order 1967 (SI 1967/156), Secretary of State for Employment and Productivity Order 1968 (SI 1968/729), Secretary of State for Social Services Order 1968 (SI 1968/1699), Minister of Technology Order 1969 (SI 1969/1498), Post Office Act 1969 (c. 48), Secretary of State for the Environment Order 1970 (SI 1970/1681), Transfer of Functions (Overseas Aid) Order 1970 (SI 1970/1682), Ministry of Aviation Supply (Dissolution) Order 1971 (SI 1971/719), Statute Law (Repeals) Act 1974 (c. 22), House of Commons Disqualification Act 1975 (c. 24), Northern Ireland Assembly Disqualification Act 1975 (c. 25) and Ministers of the Crown Act 1975 (c. 26))

== Local acts ==
Short title	Citation	Royal assent
Long title
Motherwell and Wishaw Burgh Extension, &c. Order Confirmation Act 1964	1964 c. i	25 March 1964
An Act to confirm a Provisional Order under the Private Legislation Procedure (Scotland) Act 1936, (Note: Private Legislation Procedure (Scotland) Act 1936 (26 Geo. 5 & 1 Edw. 8. c. 52)) relating to the Motherwell and Wishaw Burgh Extension, &c.
	Motherwell and Wishaw Burgh Extension Order 1964 Provisional Order to extend the boundaries of the burgh of Motherwell and Wishaw; to confer further powers upon the provost, magistrates and councillors of the said burgh with regard to their water undertaking; to make provision with respect to the local government health administration and finance of the said burgh; and for other purposes.	
Port of London (Extension of Seaward Limit) Act 1964 (repealed)	1964 c. ii	25 March 1964
An Act to extend the existing seaward limit of jurisdiction of the Port of London Authority, and for other purposes. (Repealed by Port of London Act 1968 (c. xxxii))
Customs Annuity and Benevolent Fund Act 1964	1964 c. iii	25 March 1964
An Act to extend the benefits of the Customs Annuity and Benevolent Fund; and for other purposes.
City of London (Courts) Act 1964	1964 c. iv	25 March 1964
An Act to make provision for the appointment of judges of the Central Criminal Court and with respect to the constitution and proceedings of the Mayor's and City of London Court; and for other purposes.
Macduff Harbour Order Confirmation Act 1964 (repealed)	1964 c. v	10 June 1964
An Act to confirm a Provisional Order under the Private Legislation Procedure (Scotland) Act 1936, relating to Macduff Harbour. (Repealed by Grampian Regional Order Confirmation Act 1987 (c. x))
	Macduff Harbour Order 1964 Provisional Order to authorise the provost, magistrates and councillors of the burgh of Macduff to carry out works for the improvement of the harbour of Macduff and to borrow money and for other purposes.	
Chichester Rural District Council Act 1964	1964 c. vi	10 June 1964
An Act to provide for the cesser of charges payable under the Coast Protection Act, 1949, (Note: Coast Protection Act 1949 (12, 13 & 14 Geo. 6. c. 74))
Life Association of Scotland Limited Act 1964	1964 c. vii	10 June 1964
An Act to make provision with respect to the substitution of a memorandum and articles of association for the existing constitution of the Life Association of Scotland Limited; to confer further powers on the Association with respect to the regulation of its business and affairs; and for other purposes.
Chapel Street Congregational Church (Southport) Burial Ground Act 1964	1964 c. viii	10 June 1964
An Act to authorise the removal of the restrictions attaching to the burial ground attached to or comprised in the Congregational Church and Sunday School Building situate at Chapel Street, in the borough of Southport; to authorise the use of the said burial ground for building or otherwise; and for other purposes.
Harwich Harbour Act 1964 (repealed)	1964 c. ix	10 June 1964
An Act to confer further powers upon the Harwich Harbour Conservancy Board in respect of its reserve fund. (Repealed by Harwich Harbour Act 1974 (c. i))
Cheshire Brine Pumping (Compensation for Subsidence) Act 1964	1964 c. x	10 June 1964
An Act to amend the Cheshire Brine Pumping (Compensation for Subsidence) Act, 1952; (Note: Cheshire Brine Pumping (Compensation for Subsidence) Act 1952 (15 & 16 Geo. 6 & 1 Eliz. 2. c. xlii)) and for other purposes.
Newcastle-under-Lyme Corporation Act 1964 (repealed)	1964 c. xi	10 June 1964
An Act to provide for the vesting in the mayor, aldermen and burgesses of the borough of Newcastle-under-Lyme of certain lands in the borough; to provide for the extinction of certain rights therein or thereover; to make further provision for the local government, health and improvement of the borough; and for other purposes. (Repealed by Staffordshire Act 1983 (c. xviii))
Stafford Corporation Act 1964 (repealed)	1964 c. xii	10 June 1964
An Act to amend the Stafford Corporation Act, 1880; (Note: Stafford Corporation Act 1880 (43 & 44 Vict. c. lxxiii)) to make further provision with regard to certain allotment gardens formed for the use of the freemen of the borough of Stafford; and for other purposes. (Repealed by Staffordshire Act 1983 (c. xviii))
Saint John's Church, Smith Square Act 1964	1964 c. xiii	10 June 1964
An Act to authorise the sale by the London Diocesan Fund of the Church of Saint John the Evangelist, Smith Square, in the city of Westminster, to authorise the reconstruction of the church and its use for religious and other charitable purposes; and for other purposes.
Barry Corporation Act 1964 (repealed)	1964 c. xiv	10 June 1964
An Act to confer powers on the mayor, aldermen and burgesses of the borough of Barry in relation to the sale or other disposition of certain lands at Barry Island; and for purposes incidental thereto. (Repealed by County of South Glamorgan Act 1976 (c. xxxv))
Elim Church Moor Lane Bolton Burial Ground Act 1964	1964 c. xv	10 June 1964
An Act to authorise the removal of the restrictions attaching to the burial ground forming part of the site of the former church known as the Elim Church situate at Moor Lane, in the borough of Bolton, to authorise the use of the said burial ground for building purposes or otherwise; and for other purposes.
British Railways Act 1964	1964 c. xvi	10 June 1964
An Act to empower the British Railways Board to construct works and to acquire lands; to extend the time for the compulsory purchase of certain lands and the completion of a certain work; to confer further powers on the Board; and for other purposes.
Tees Conservancy Act 1964	1964 c. xvii	10 June 1964
An Act to confer upon the Tees Conservancy Commissioners further powers with respect to the raising of money; to extend the time for the completion by the Commissioners of certain works; and for other purposes.
Preston Corporation Act 1964	1964 c. xviii	10 June 1964
An Act to confer further powers on the mayor, aldermen and burgesses of the borough of Preston, to make further provision in reference to the Ribble Navigation, the health, local government, improvement and finances of the borough, to confer further powers on the constituent councils of the Preston and District Water Board in regard to the recovery of rates and charges on behalf of the board; and for other purposes.
Shell Company of Australia Act 1964 (Note: The corresponding act in Australia was the Shell Company of Australia Limited Act 1963 (No. 7053 (Vic)))	1964 c. xix	16 July 1964
An Act to make provision for the transfer to the State of Victoria in the Commonwealth of Australia of the registered office of the Shell Company of Australia Limited; for the cesser of application to that Company of provisions of the Companies Act, 1948; (Note: Companies Act 1948 (11 & 12 Geo. 6. c. 38)) and for other purposes incidental thereto.
Norfolk Estuary Act 1964	1964 c. xx	16 July 1964
An Act to confirm an agreement for the transfer to the Crown Estate Commissioners of certain lands now vested in the Company of Proprietors of the Norfolk Estuary; to provide for the winding up of that company; and for other purposes.
Saint Paul, Portman Square, Saint Marylebone Act 1964	1964 c. xxi	16 July 1964
An Act to provide for the demolition of the church of Saint Paul, Portman Square, in the metropolitan borough of Saint Marylebone; to authorise the sale of the site thereof and the lands appurtenant thereto and the use for other purposes of the said site and lands; and for other purposes incidental thereto.
Worcester Corporation Act 1964 (repealed)	1964 c. xxii	16 July 1964
An Act to exclude statutory provisions relating to a hop market from application to certain lands in the city of Worcester; and for other purposes. (Repealed by Worcester City Council Act 1985 (c. xliii))
National Provident Institution Act 1964 (repealed)	1964 c. xxiii	16 July 1964
An Act to amend the National Provident Institution Act, 1910, (Note: National Provident Institution Act 1910 (10 Edw. 7 & 1 Geo. 5. c. ix)) and to confer further powers on the National Provident Institution; and for other purposes. (Repealed by National Provident Institution Act 1987 (c. xxii))
Saint Dionis Backchurch Churchyard (Amendment) Act 1964	1964 c. xxiv	16 July 1964
An Act to amend the Saint Dionis Backchurch Churchyard Act 1963, (Note: Saint Dionis Backchurch Churchyard Act 1963 (c. xiv)) and for purposes incidental thereto.
Isle of Wight River and Water Authority Act 1964	1964 c. xxv	16 July 1964
An Act to constitute the Isle of Wight River and Water Authority; to confer upon that authority the functions of a river authority under the Water Resources Act 1963 (Note: Water Resources Act 1963 (c. 38)) and the functions of statutory water undertakers under the Water Acts, 1945 (Note: Water Act 1945 (8 & 9 Geo. 6. c. 42)) and 1948; (Note: Water Act 1948 (11 & 12 Geo. 6. c. 22)) to transfer to that authority the undertaking of the Isle of Wight Water Board and to dissolve that board; to confer powers upon the said authority; and for other purposes.
London Transport Act 1964	1964 c. xxvi	16 July 1964
An Act to empower the London Transport Board to construct works and to acquire lands, to extend the time for the compulsory purchase of certain lands, to confer further powers on the Board; and for other purposes.
London County Council (Money) Act 1964	1964 c. xxvii	16 July 1964
An Act to regulate the expenditure on capital account and lending of money by the London County Council during the financial year from 1st April 1964 to 31st March 1965; and for other purposes.
London County Council (General Powers) Act 1964	1964 c. xxviii	16 July 1964
An Act to empower the London County Council to execute street and other works and to acquire lands, to confer further powers on the London County Council; and for other purposes.
Pier and Harbour Order (King's Lynn Conservancy) Confirmation Act 1964	1964 c. xxix	31 July 1964
An Act to confirm a Provisional Order made by the Minister of Transport under the General Pier and Harbour Act 1861, (Note: General Pier and Harbour Act 1861 (24 & 25 Vict. c. 45)) relating to King's Lynn Conservancy.
	King's Lynn Conservancy Order 1964 Provisional Order to confer upon the King's Lynn Conservancy Board additional borrowing powers and for other purposes.	
Pier and Harbour Order (Bideford Harbour) Confirmation Act 1964	1964 c. xxx	31 July 1964
An Act to confirm a Provisional Order made by the Minister of Transport under the General Pier and Harbour Act 1861, relating to Bideford Harbour.
	Bideford Harbour Order 1964 Provisional Order to extend the limits within which the mayor, aldermen and burgesses of the borough of Bideford may levy rates in respect of their harbour undertaking; to authorise the construction of harbour works; and for other purposes.	
Ministry of Housing and Local Government Provisional Order Confirmation (Shoreham and Lancing) Act 1964 (repealed)	1964 c. xxxi	31 July 1964
An Act to confirm a Provisional Order of the Minister of Housing and Local Government relating to the rural district of Worthing. (Repealed by Southern Water Authority Act 1980 (c. xxxviii))
	Shoreham and Lancing Sea Defence Order 1964 Provisional Order amending and partially repealing certain Provisional Orders.	
Mersey River Board Act 1964	1964 c. xxxii	31 July 1964
An Act to authorise the Mersey River Board to construct works and to acquire lands in connection with a diversion of the river Irwell in the county boroughs of Salford and Manchester; and for other purposes.
Bedford Corporation Act 1964 (repealed)	1964 c. xxxiii	31 July 1964
An Act to confer further powers upon the mayor, aldermen and burgesses of the borough of Bedford; to make further provision with regard to lands and for the improvement and local government of the said borough; to provide for the transfer to the said mayor, aldermen and burgesses of the estate of the guardians of the poor within the town of Bedford in the county of Bedford and the dissolution of those guardians; and for other purposes. (Repealed by Statute Law (Repeals) Act 1995 (c. 44))
Cumberland County Council Act 1964 (repealed)	1964 c. xxxiv	31 July 1964
An Act to confer further powers on the Cumberland County Council and on local authorities in the administrative county of Cumberland in relation to lands, amenities, industrial development and highways and the local government, improvement, health and educational services and finances of the county and of the boroughs and districts therein; and for other purposes. (Repealed by Cumbria Act 1982 (c. xv))
Newcastle upon Tyne Corporation Act 1964 (repealed)	1964 c. xxxv	31 July 1964
An Act to confer further powers upon the lord mayor, aldermen and citizens of the city and county of Newcastle upon Tyne and the stewards and wardens committee of the Town Moor in the city in relation to the Town Moor; to confer further powers upon the Corporation; to make further provision with regard to the health, local government, welfare, improvement and finances of the city; and for other purposes. (Repealed by Newcastle-upon-Tyne Town Moor Act 1988 (c. xxxi))
Port of London Act 1964 (repealed)	1964 c. xxxvi	31 July 1964
An Act to confer further powers on the Port of London Authority; and for other purposes. (Repealed by Port of London Act 1968 (c. xxxii))
Saint George Hanover Square Burial Ground Act 1964	1964 c. xxxvii	31 July 1964
An Act to provide for the removal of the restrictions attaching to the burial ground at Bayswater Road in the metropolitan borough of Paddington vested in the rector and churchwardens of the parish of Saint George Hanover Square; to authorise the subsequent use or disposition thereof; and for other purposes.
British Transport Docks Act 1964	1964 c. xxxviii	31 July 1964
An Act to empower the British Transport Docks Board to construct works and to acquire lands; to confer powers on the Steel Company of Wales Limited or a subsidiary thereof with respect to certain of such works and lands; to confer further powers on the Board; and for other purposes.
West Riding County Council (General Powers) Act 1964 (repealed)	1964 c. xxxix	31 July 1964
An Act to confer further powers on the West Riding County Council and on local authorities in the administrative county of the West Riding of Yorkshire in relation to industry, lands and highways and the local government, improvement, health and finances of the county; and for other purposes. (Repealed by Statute Law (Repeals) Act 1989 (c. 43))
Wentworth Estate Act 1964	1964 c. xl	31 July 1964
An Act to make provision for the maintenance of the private roads and footpaths on the estate known as the Wentworth Estate in the urban district of Egham and the rural district of Bagshot in the county of Surrey; and for other purposes.
Edinburgh Corporation Order Confirmation Act 1964	1964 c. xli	17 December 1964
An Act to confirm a Provisional Order under the Private Legislation Procedure (Scotland) Act 1936 relating to the Edinburgh Corporation.
	Edinburgh Corporation Order 1964 Provisional Order to make provision as to the constitution, powers, duties and finances of the Edinburgh Sheriff Court House Commissioners and to consolidate with amendments the Acts and Orders of or relating to the Corporation of the city of Edinburgh with respect to the Dean of Guild Court of the said city, buildings, streets, etc., sewers and drains, the Water of Leith, watercourses and other matters and for other purposes.	
Clyde Navigation Order Confirmation Act 1964	1964 c. xlii	23 December 1964
An Act to confirm a Provisional Order under the Private Legislation Procedure (Scotland) Act 1936, relating to the Clyde Navigation.
	Clyde Navigation Order 1964 Provisional Order to confer further powers on the Trustees of the Clyde Navigation; and for other purposes.	
Glasgow Corporation Consolidation (Water, Transport and Markets) Order Confirmation Act 1964	1964 c. xliii	23 December 1964
An Act to confirm a Provisional Order under the Private Legislation Procedure (Scotland) Act 1936, relating to Glasgow Corporation Consolidation (Water, Transport and Markets).
	Glasgow Corporation Consolidation (Water, Transport and Markets) Order 1964 Provisional Order to consolidate with amendments the Acts and Orders of or relating to the water, transport, markets and slaughterhouses undertakings of the Corporation of the city of Glasgow, to confer further powers on them with respect to such undertakings and for other purposes.	

== See also ==
- List of acts of the Parliament of the United Kingdom
