= Land Compensation Act 1961 =

Act of the Parliament of the United Kingdom

Land Compensation Act 1961 (Note: Section 42(1).)
- Act of Parliament
- Parliament of the United Kingdom
- Long title: An Act to consolidate the Acquisition of Land (Assessment of Compensation) Act 1919, and certain other enactments relating to the assessment of compensation in respect of compulsory acquisitions of interests in land; to the withdrawal of notices to treat; and to the payment of additional compensation and of allowances in connection with such acquisitions or with certain sales by agreement of interests in land; with corrections and improvements made under the Consolidation of Enactments (Procedure) Act 1949
- Citation: 9 & 10 Eliz. 2. c. 33
- Territorial extent: England and Wales (Note: Section 42(3).)

Dates
- Royal assent: 22 June 1961
- Commencement: 1 August 1961 (Note: Section 42(1).)
Other legislation
Amends	See § Repealed enactments
Repeals/revokes	See § Repealed enactments
Amended by	London Government Act 1963; New Towns Act 1965; Secretary of State for Wales and Minister of Land and Natural Resources Order 1965; New Towns Act 1966; Town and Country Planning Act 1968; Town and Country Planning Act 1971; Local Government Act 1972; Land Compensation Act 1973; Statute Law (Repeals) Act 1974; Community Land Act 1975; Local Authorities etc. (Miscellaneous Provision) Order 1976; Interpretation Act 1978; Acquisition of Land Act 1981; Housing (Consequential Provisions) Act 1985; Local Government and Housing Act 1989; Statute Law (Repeals) Act 1989; Planning and Compensation Act 1991; Local Government (Wales) Act 1994; Environment Act 1995; Planning and Compulsory Purchase Act 2004; Church of England (Miscellaneous Provisions) Measure 2006; Transfer of Tribunal Functions (Lands Tribunal and Miscellaneous Amendments) Order 2009; Localism Act 2011; Housing and Planning Act 2016; Neighbourhood Planning Act 2017; Levelling-up and Regeneration Act 2023; Planning and Infrastructure Act 2025

Status: Amended

History of passage through Parliament

Text of statute as originally enacted

Revised text of statute as amended

Text of the Land Compensation Act 1961 as in force today (including any amendments) within the United Kingdom, from legislation.gov.uk.

The Land Compensation Act 1961 (9 & 10 Eliz. 2. c. 33) is an act of the Parliament of the United Kingdom, which concerns English land law and compulsory purchase. The majority of this act was brought into force on 1 August 1961, with Part V s.42 coming into force on 22 July 1961.

The act consolidated several earlier acts of Parliament which concerned compensation for compulsory purchase, most notably the Acquisition of Land (Assessment of Compensation) Act 1919 (9 & 10 Geo. 5. c. 57).

The Land Compensation (Scotland) Act 1963 made equivalent provisions for Scotland.

== Contents ==
=== Part I – Determination of questions of disputed compensation ===
Section 1 provides that where land is acquired under compulsory purchase, any disputed compensation should be decided by the Upper Tribunal in accordance with this act, as amended by the Transfer of Tribunal Functions (Lands Tribunal and Miscellaneous Amendments) Order 2009 (SI 2009/1307). Section 4A was inserted by the Housing and Planning Act 2016.

=== Part II – Provisions determining amount of compensation ===
Part II sets out the provisions which must be applied to determine the amount of compensation owed to owners of land which has been acquired under the compulsory purchase scheme. Section 5 Rule 2 provides that the owner of an interest in land (e.g. a freehold, leasehold, or easement as in Re Ellenborough Park) should receive the open market value of the property. This is defined as the "value of the land... if sold on an open market by a willing seller". The amount of compensation owed to the landowner is not affected by the land acquisition being compulsory, the special suitability of the land for a particular purpose or any unlawful existing use. However, this does not exclude additional compensation owed to the landowner for disturbance.

The Neighbourhood Planning Act 2017 inserted an additional Rule 2A, which requires the compensation to be calculated in accordance with the no-scheme rules in sections 6A. This codified the ruling in the case of Pointe Gourde Quarrying & Transport Co v Sub-Intendent of Crown Lands. The Privy Council ruled that that compensation could not include any increases which were the result of the scheme for which the acquiring authority was purchasing the land. In addition, the no-scheme rules in the Act disregard any decrease in value which is the result of the scheme. The land must be valued as if there was never any scheme, and the valuers must imagine what developments would or would not have occurred in its place.

The original planning assumptions in sections 14-17 of the act were amended by the Localism Act 2011. They allow land to be valued for its existing use, or valued by taking into account any planning permission which was in force on the valuation date, the potential future grant of planning permission, or appropriate alternative development.

=== Part III – Certification By planning authorities of appropriate alternative development ===
Section 17 says that either the acquiring authority or the landowner can ask the local planning authority for a certificate which states whether there is a development which would satisfy the test for appropriate alternative development.

=== Part IV – Compensation where permission for additional development granted after acquisition ===
This part was omitted by the Neighbourhood Planning Act 2017.

=== Repealed enactments ===
Section 40(3) of the act repealed 14 enactments, listed in the fifth schedule to the act.

Citation	Short title	Extent of repeal
9 & 10 Geo. 5. c. 57	Acquisition of Land (Assessment of Compensation) Act 1919	The whole act.
20 & 21 Geo. 5. c. 44	Land Drainage Act 1930	Subsection (5) of section forty-five.
2 & 3 Geo. 6. c. 22	Camps Act 1939	Subsection (5) of section two.
7 & 8 Geo. 6. c. 47	Town and Country Planning Act 1944	In the Fifth Schedule as applied by the New Towns Act 1946, paragraph 9.
9 & 10 Geo. 6. c. 68	New Towns Act 1946	Subsection (7) of section four. In the Fourth Schedule, the entry relating to paragraph 9 of the Fifth Schedule to the Town and Country Planning Act 1944.
10 & 11 Geo. 6. c. 51	Town and Country Planning Act 1947	Sections fifty, fifty-four, fifty-six, and fifty-seven. Subsection (2) of section one hundred and eighteen. The Seventh Schedule.
12, 13 & 14 Geo. 6. c. 42	Lands Tribunal Act 1949	In section one, in paragraph (5) of subsection (3), the words from "and is" to the end of the paragraph; in subsection (4), the words from "including the power" to the end of the subsection; and subsection (7). Subsection (7) of section three. Section five. In section seven, in subsection (1), the words "and is not contained in the Acquisition of Land Act". The First Schedule.
12, 13 & 14 Geo. 6. c. 84	War Damaged Sites Act 1949	In subsection (1) of section eight, the words "in a case to which the Acquisition of Land (Assessment of Compensation) Act 1919 applies," paragraph (6), and the word "and" preceding that paragraph.
12, 13 & 14 Geo. 6. c. 97	National Parks and Access to the Countryside Act 1949	Subsection (3) of section one hundred and three.
1 & 2 Eliz. 2. c. 16	Town and Country Planning Act 1953	Subsection (1) of section three.
2 & 3 Eliz. 2. c. 72	Town and Country Planning Act 1954	Subsection (7) of section seventy-one.
5 & 6 Eliz. 2. c. 56	Housing Act 1957	In the Third Schedule, in paragraph 7, paragraph (5) of sub-paragraph (1); and in paragraph 8, the words in sub-paragraph (1) "and the Acquisition of Land (Assessment of Compensation) Act 1919" and sub-paragraph (2). In the Tenth Schedule, paragraph 2 of the entry relating to the Town and Country Planning Act 1944.
7 & 8 Eliz. 2. c. 25	Highways Act 1959	Subsection (8) of section two hundred and twenty-two.
7 & 8 Eliz. 2. c. 53	Town and Country Planning Act 1959	Part I except sections fourteen to sixteen. In section thirty-one, in subsection (4), paragraph (f). The First, Second and Third Schedules. In the Seventh Schedule, the entry relating to section fifty-four of the Town and Country Planning Act 1947.

== Subsequent developments ==
Section 40(3) of, and schedule 5 to, the act were repealed by section 1 of, and part XI of the schedule to, the Statute Law (Repeals) Act 1974, which came into force on 27 June 1974.

== See also ==
- English land law
- Compulsory purchase

== Bibliography ==
- K. Gray and S. F. Gray, Land Law (7th edn 2011) Ch 11
- K. Gray and S. Gray, ‘Private Property and Public Propriety’, in J McLean (ed), Property and the Constitution (Hart 1999) 36-7
