= Levelling-up and Regeneration Act 2023 =

Act of the Parliament of the United Kingdom

Levelling-up and Regeneration Act 2023 (Note: Section 256.)
- Act of Parliament
- Parliament of the United Kingdom
- Long title: An Act to make provision for the setting of levelling-up missions and reporting on progress in delivering them; about local democracy; about town and country planning; about Community Infrastructure Levy; about the imposition of Infrastructure Levy; about environmental outcome reports for certain consents and plans; about nutrient pollution standards; about regeneration; about the compulsory purchase of land; about information and records relating to land, the environment or heritage; about the registration of short-term rental properties; for the provision for pavement licences to be permanent; about governance of the Royal Institution of Chartered Surveyors; about the charging of fees in connection with marine licences; for a body to replace the Health and Safety Executive as the building safety regulator; about the transfer of land for Academy schools; about the review of maps of open country and registered common land; about the regulation of childminding; about qualifying leases under the Building Safety Act 2022; about road user charging schemes in London; about National Parks, areas of outstanding natural beauty and the Broads; and for connected purposes.
- Citation: 2023 c. 55
- Introduced by: Michael Gove, Secretary of State for Levelling Up, Housing and Communities (Commons); The Baroness Scott of Bybrook, Parliamentary Under-Secretary of State for Faith and Communities (Lords)
- Territorial extent: United Kingdom (Note: Section 254.)

Dates
- Royal assent: 26 October 2023
- Commencement: On royal assent and by regulations (Note: Section 255.)
Other legislation
Amends	Local Government Act 1894; Land Compensation Act 1961; Employers' Liability (Compulsory Insurance) Act 1969; Rent Act 1977; Protection from Eviction Act 1977; Public Passenger Vehicles Act 1981; New Towns Act 1981; Compulsory Purchase (Vesting Declarations) Act 1981; County Courts Act 1984; Housing Associations Act 1985; Town and Country Planning Act 1990; Planning (Listed Buildings and Conservation Areas) Act 1990; Planning (Hazardous Substances) Act 1990; Water Industry Act 1991; Further and Higher Education Act 1992; Countryside and Rights of Way Act 2000; Railways Act 2005; Commons Act 2006; Government of Wales Act 2006; National Health Service Act 2006; Tribunals, Courts and Enforcement Act 2007; Cities and Local Government Devolution Act 2016; Policing and Crime Act 2017; Digital Economy Act 2017; Data Protection Act 2018; Health and Care Act 2022; Elections Act 2022; Procurement Act 2023
Amended by	Historic Environment (Wales) Act 2023; Historic Environment (Wales) Act 2023 (Consequential Provision) (Primary Legislation) Regulations 2024; Historic Environment (Wales) Act 2023 (Consequential Provision) (Primary Legislation) Regulations 2024; Bus Services Act 2025; Planning and Infrastructure Act 2025; Biodiversity Beyond National Jurisdiction Act 2026; English Devolution and Community Empowerment Act 2026; Licensing Hours Extensions Act 2026

Status: Amended

History of passage through Parliament

Text of statute as originally enacted

Revised text of statute as amended

The Levelling-up and Regeneration Act 2023 (c. 55) is an act of the Parliament of the United Kingdom.

The act is said to "speed up the planning system, hold developers to account, cut bureaucracy, and encourage more councils to put in place plans to enable the building of new homes" by the government. The government said this would "transform town centres by giving councils the powers to work directly with landlords to bring empty buildings back into use by local businesses and community groups, breathing life back into empty high streets".

Aspects of the act were opposed by many members of local government, who said it would undermine regional and local leaders. The act also relaxed the blanket ban on onshore wind farms which had been introduced in 2015. The act introduced a requirement of planning permission for short-term lets, to reduce the "scourge" of second homes.

The act (amongst other things):

- introduced levelling-up missions.
- created a new form of devolved local government called a 'combined county authority'.
- created new powers for combined authorities.
- allowed for the modification of titles of mayors of new and existing combined authorities.
- introduced a new Infrastructure Levy, and altered the existing Community Infrastructure Levy.
- made the biggest changes to the planning system for a number of years.

Certain parts of the act came into force on royal assent. A large proportion of the act came into force on 26 December 2023, being two months after the act was passed. Regulations were made by the Secretary of State to bring into force the rest of the provisions in stages during the following years.

The Starmer ministry did not implement the Infrastructure Levy, instead keeping the current Community Infrastructure Levy.

== Parliamentary passage ==
The act was first introduced to the House of Commons on 11 May 2022 and received its third reading in the House of Lords on 21 September 2023. It was part of the government's levelling-up policy, and had a long history preceding it. The Bill was criticised for covering a significant number of different policy areas, and was labelled a "mish-mash" of various policy areas and a "Christmas tree Bill" by Baroness Hayman of Ullock. The size and policy areas covered by the Act were castigated by many politicians. It was piloted through the Commons by Michael Gove, the Secretary of State for Levelling Up, Housing and Communities, and through the Lords by Baroness Scott of Bybrook, the Parliamentary Under Secretary of State for Faith and Communities.

During the bill's passage through the Lords, further policy areas were introduced, such as provisions concerning the Ultra Low Emission Zone in London, and also childminding. One provision which the Lords vociferously rejected was a reduction in nutrient neutrality requirements: an environmental regulation inherited from the EU which requires local planning authorities to consider the impact of new homes on the local environment and waterways (mainly an increase in sewage). The government said that the change would allow over 100,000 additional homes to be built.

The act received royal assent on 26 October 2023.
