= New Towns Act 1981 =

Act of the Parliament of the United Kingdom

New Towns Act 1981 (Note: Section 82(1).)
- Act of Parliament
- Parliament of the United Kingdom
- Long title: An Act to consolidate certain enactments relating to new towns and connected matters, being (except for section 43 of the New Towns Act 1965 and sections 126 and 127 of the Local Government, Planning and Land Act 1980 and certain related provisions) enactments which apply only to England and Wales.
- Citation: 1981 c. 64
- Territorial extent: England and Wales; Scotland (in part); Northern Ireland (in part); (Note: Section 82(2)–(3).)

Dates
- Royal assent: 30 October 1981
- Commencement: 30 November 1981 (Note: Section 82(4).)

Other legislation
- Amends: See § Repealed enactments
- Repeals/revokes: See § Repealed enactments
- Amended by: Civil Aviation Act 1982; New Towns and Urban Development Corporations Act 1985; Airports Act 1986; Income and Corporation Taxes Act 1988; Planning (Consequential Provisions) Act 1990; New Towns (Amendment) Act 1994; Employment Tribunals Act 1996; Employment Rights Act 1996; National Health Service (Consequential Provisions) Act 2006; Postal Services Act 2011; Housing and Planning Act 2016; Levelling-up and Regeneration Act 2023; Planning and Infrastructure Act 2025

Status: Amended

Text of statute as originally enacted

Revised text of statute as amended

Text of the New Towns Act 1981 as in force today (including any amendments) within the United Kingdom, from legislation.gov.uk.

The New Towns Act 1981 (c. 64) is an act of the Parliament of the United Kingdom that consolidated enactments relating to new towns in England and Wales.

== Provisions ==
=== Repealed enactments ===
Section 81(b) of the act repealed 24 enactments, listed in schedule 13 to the act.

Citation	Short title	Extent of repeal
7 & 8 Eliz. 2. c. 62	New Towns Act 1959	The whole act.
1965 c. 59	New Towns Act 1965	The whole act.
1966 c. 44	New Towns Act 1966	The whole act.
1968 c. 13	National Loans Act 1968	In Schedule 1, the entry so far as it relates to sections 44(1) and (3) and sections 45 and 46(5) of the New Towns Act 1965.
1969 c. 48	Post Office Act 1969	In Schedule 4, paragraph 78.
1971 c. 78	Town and Country Planning Act 1971	In Part II of Schedule 23, the entry relating to the New Towns Act 1965.
1972 c. 11	Superannuation Act 1972	In Schedule 6, paragraph 53.
1972 c. 47	Housing Finance Act 1972	Section 14.
1972 c. 70	Local Government Act 1972	In Part II of Schedule 16, paragraph 56.
1972 c. 70	Local Government Act 1972	In Part II of Schedule 29, paragraph 29.
1973 c. 26	Land Compensation Act 1973	Section 72(6).
1973 c. 37	Water Act 1973	In Schedule 8, paragraphs 88 and 89.
1974 c. 8	Statutory Corporations (Financial Provisions) Act 1974	In Schedule 3, Part I.
1975 c. 42	New Towns Act 1975	The whole act.
1975 c. 76	Local Land Charges Act 1975	In Schedule 1, the entry relating to the New Towns Act 1965.
1976 c. 68	New Towns (Amendment) Act 1976	The whole act.
1976 c. 75	Development of Rural Wales Act 1976	In Schedule 7, paragraphs 4 and 17.
1976 c. 80	Rent (Agriculture) Act 1976	In Schedule 8, paragraph 12.
1977 c. 23	New Towns Act 1977	The whole act.
1977 c. 42	Rent Act 1977	In Schedule 23, paragraph 39.
1978 c. 44	Employment Protection (Consolidation) Act 1978	In Schedule 16, paragraph 24.
1980 c. 36	New Towns Act 1980	The whole act.
1980 c. 65	Local Government, Planning and Land Act 1980	Sections 126 to 130.
1980 c. 65	Local Government, Planning and Land Act 1980	In section 133(1) the words— "'development corporation' has (in the application of this Part to Scotland) the same meaning as in the 1968 Act", and "'the 1965 Act' means the New Towns Act 1965".
1980 c. 65	Local Government, Planning and Land Act 1980	In section 133(2) the words "the 1965 Act".
1980 c. 65	Local Government, Planning and Land Act 1980	Section 133(3).
1980 c. 65	Local Government, Planning and Land Act 1980	In Schedule 25, Part I.
1980 c. 66	Highways Act 1980	In Schedule 24, paragraph 15.
1981 c. 38	British Telecommunications Act 1981	In Part II of Schedule 3, paragraphs 11(2)(b) and 43.

== Subsequent developments ==
The act has been amended by a number of subsequent statutes. The New Towns and Urban Development Corporations Act 1985 repealed certain provisions, including words in section 1(5). Further amendments were made by the Housing and Planning Act 2016, the Levelling-up and Regeneration Act 2023, and the Planning and Infrastructure Act 2025.
