= Land Compensation (Scotland) Act 1963 =

Act of the Parliament of the United Kingdom

Land Compensation (Scotland) Act 1963 (Note: Section 49(1).)
- Act of Parliament
- Parliament of the United Kingdom
- Long title: An Act to consolidate the Acquisition of Land (Assessment of Compensation) Act 1919 and certain other enactments relating to the assessment of compensation in respect of compulsory acquisitions of interests in land; to the withdrawal of notices to treat; and to the payment of additional compensation and of allowances in connection with such acquisitions or with certain sales by agreement of interests in land; with corrections and improvements made under the Consolidation of Enactments (Procedure) Act 1949
- Citation: 1963 c. 51
- Territorial extent: Scotland (Note: Section 49(4).)

Dates
- Royal assent: 31 July 1963
- Commencement: 1 January 1964 (except Part II); 1 March 1971 (Note: The Lands Tribunal Act 1949 (Appointed Day) (Scotland) Order 1971.) (Note: Section 49(2).)
Other legislation
Amends	See § Repealed enactments
Repeals/revokes	See § Repealed enactments
Amended by	New Towns Act 1966; Land Commission Act 1967; Agriculture (Miscellaneous Provisions) Act 1968; Town and Country Planning (Scotland) Act 1969; Roads (Scotland) Act 1970; Tribunals and Inquiries Act 1971; Town and Country Planning (Scotland) Act 1972; Statute Law (Repeals) Act 1974; Community Land Act 1975; Local Government, Planning and Land Act 1980; Miscellaneous Financial Provisions Act 1983; Housing (Scotland) Act 1987; Statute Law (Repeals) Act 1989; Agricultural Holdings (Scotland) Act 1991; Planning and Compensation Act 1991; Town and Country Planning (Scotland) Act 1997; Planning (Consequential Provisions) (Scotland) Act 1997; Abolition of Feudal Tenure etc. (Scotland) Act 2000
Relates to	Land Compensation Act 1961

Status: Amended

Text of statute as originally enacted

Revised text of statute as amended

Text of the Land Compensation (Scotland) Act 1963 as in force today (including any amendments) within the United Kingdom, from legislation.gov.uk.

The Land Compensation (Scotland) Act 1963 (c. 51) is an act of the Parliament of the United Kingdom that consolidated enactments relating to the assessment of compensation for compulsory acquisitions of interests in land in Scotland.

The Land Compensation Act 1961(9 & 10 Eliz. 2. c. 33) made equivalent provisions for England and Wales.

== Provisions ==
=== Repealed enactments ===
Section 47(3) of the act repealed 13 enactments, listed in the fourth schedule to the act.

Citation	Short title	Extent of repeal
9 & 10 Geo. 5. c. 57	Acquisition of Land (Assessment of Compensation) Act 1919	The whole act.
21 & 22 Geo. 5. c. 11	Acquisition of Land (Assessment of Compensation) (Scotland) Act 1931	The whole act.
2 & 3 Geo. 6. c. 22	Camps Act 1939	Section 2(5).
8 & 9 Geo. 6. c. 33	Town and Country Planning (Scotland) Act 1945	In Schedule 5 as applied by the New Towns Act 1946, paragraph 8.
9 & 10 Geo. 6. c. 68	New Towns Act 1946	Section 4(7). In Schedule 5, the entry relating to paragraph 8 of Schedule 5 to the Town and Country Planning (Scotland) Act 1945.
10 & 11 Geo. 6. c. 53	Town and Country Planning (Scotland) Act 1947	Sections 47, 51, 53, 54 and 112(2). Schedule 7.
12, 13 & 14 Geo. 6. c. 42	Lands Tribunal Act 1949	In section 1(3)(b), the words from "and is" to the end of the paragraph; in section 1(4), the words from "including the power" to the end of the subsection; and section 1(7). Section 3(7). Section 5. In section 7(1), the words "and is not contained in the Acquisition of Land Act". Schedule 1.
12, 13 & 14 Geo. 6. c. 84	War Damaged Sites Act 1949	In section 8(1), the words "in a case to which the Acquisition of Land (Assessment of Compensation) Act, 1919, applies," paragraph (b), and the word "and" preceding that paragraph. Section 8(2).
12, 13 & 14 Geo. 6. c. 97	National Parks and Access to the Countryside Act 1949	Section 103(3).
1 & 2 Eliz. 2. c. 16	Town and Country Planning Act 1953	Section 3(1).
2 & 3 Eliz. 2. c. 73	Town and Country Planning (Scotland) Act 1954	In section 31(1), the words from "by a government" to the end of the subsection. Section 62.
7 & 8 Eliz. 2. c. 70	Town and Country Planning (Scotland) Act 1959	Part I except sections 14 to 16. Section 31(4)(f). Schedules 1 to 3. In Schedule 7, the entries relating to section 51 of the Town and Country Planning (Scotland) Act 1947 and section 62(8) of the Town and Country Planning (Scotland) Act 1954.
1963 c. 11	Agriculture (Miscellaneous Provisions) Act 1963	Section 22.

== Subsequent developments ==
The act has been amended by the Town and Country Planning (Scotland) Act 1972 and the Town and Country Planning (Scotland) Act 1997.

Section 47(3) of, and schedule 4 to, the act were repealed by section 1 of, and part XI of the schedule to, the Statute Law (Repeals) Act 1974, which came into force on 27 June 1974.
