= New Towns (Scotland) Act 1968 =

Act of the Parliament of the United Kingdom

New Towns (Scotland) Act 1968 (Note: Section 49(1).)
- Act of Parliament
- Parliament of the United Kingdom
- Long title: An Act to consolidate certain enactments relating to new towns and to matters connected therewith, being those enactments in their application to Scotland; with corrections and improvements made under the Consolidation of Enactments (Procedure) Act 1949.
- Citation: 1968 c. 16
- Territorial extent: Scotland (Note: Section 49(3).)

Dates
- Royal assent: 28 March 1968
- Commencement: 1 April 1968 (Note: Section 49(2).)

Other legislation
- Amends: See § Repealed enactments
- Repeals/revokes: See § Repealed enactments
- Amended by: New Towns Act 1975; New Towns (Scotland) Act 1977; Local Government (Scotland) Act 1973; New Towns and Urban Development Corporations Act 1985; Roads (Scotland) Act 1984; Housing (Scotland) Act 1987; Enterprise and New Towns (Scotland) Act 1990
- Relates to: New Towns (Scotland) Act 1977

Status: Partially repealed

Text of statute as originally enacted

Revised text of statute as amended

Text of the New Towns (Scotland) Act 1968 as in force today (including any amendments) within the United Kingdom, from legislation.gov.uk.

The New Towns (Scotland) Act 1968 (1968 c. 16) is an act of the Parliament of the United Kingdom that consolidated enactments relating to new towns in their application to Scotland.

The New Towns Act 1965 made similar provisions for England and Wales.

== Provisions ==
=== Repealed enactments ===
Section 48(3) of the act repealed 10 enactments, listed in the eleventh schedule to the act.

Citation	Short title	Extent of repeal
8 & 9 Geo. 6. c. 33	Town and Country Planning (Scotland) Act 1945	The whole act as applied by the New Towns Act 1946.
9 & 10 Geo. 6. c. 18	Statutory Orders (Special Procedure) Act 1945	In Schedule 2, the entries relating to the Town and Country Planning (Scotland) Act 1945.
9 & 10 Geo. 6. c. 68	New Towns Act 1946	The whole act.
10 & 11 Geo. 6. c. 53	Town and Country Planning (Scotland) Act 1947	Section 43. In Schedule 8, the entry relating to the New Towns Act 1946.
12 & 13 Geo. 6. c. 59	Licensing Act 1949	Section 4(1).
6 & 7 Eliz. 2. c. 12	New Towns Act 1958	The whole act.
7 & 8 Eliz. 2. c. 62	New Towns Act 1959	The whole act, except— in section 14(1), the words from the beginning to "the New Towns Act 1959"; paragraph 1(10) of Schedule 1.
1964 c. 8	New Towns Act 1964	The whole act.
1964 c. 68	New Towns (No. 2) Act 1964	The whole act.
1966 c. 44	New Towns Act 1966	Section 3.

== Subsequent developments ==
The act has been amended by subsequent legislation. The New Towns (Scotland) Act 1977 (c. 16) amended the act to provide, among other things, for the cancellation of new town designations. The New Towns and Urban Development Corporations Act 1985 (c. 5) inserted new provisions into the act, including sections 1A, 18A, 18B and 18C. Several sections of the act have been repealed by subsequent legislation, including by the Local Government (Scotland) Act 1973 (c. 65) and the Roads (Scotland) Act 1984 (1984 c. 54).
