= Pay to stay (housing policy) =

Policy where social housing tenents earning above a threshold pay market rent

Pay to Stay was the name of a proposed government policy in the United Kingdom whereby council tenants earning £30,000 (£40,000 in London) would have to pay "market or near market rents". The measure was due to come into effect in April 2017 with the Institute for Fiscal Studies estimating that the policy would affect 10% of social housing tenants. On 21 November 2016 the Housing Minister Gavin Barwell announced that the new plans for Pay to Stay would be dropped. Councils maintain the option of charging near market rates to those on incomes of £60,000 or more.

== Criticism ==
The trade publication Inside Housing criticised the practicality of the policy given that social landlords had no mechanism to compel tenants to declare their incomes.

Other criticisms of the policy were that it might decrease the total social housing stock by encouraging people to exercise their right to buy and the policy may also disincentivize work if higher earnings resulted in a higher rent bill.

The Pay To Stay policy was also criticised as a "tax on aspiration". It was argued that workers nearing the threshold might reduce their hours to compensate for a pay rise. It was unclear whether a bonus or overtime would have been considered in the accessing of the excess rent to pay by the tenant.

The 2016–2017 tax year was the period that wages would have been accessed, to determine the excess payment. It was suggested that a taper might be used, but there was no information as to how that would have operated.

== See also ==
- Under-occupancy penalty
